= 2008 in the sport of athletics =

2008 in athletics
- Major world events: 2008 Olympics
- World records set: 10
- IAAF Athletes of the Year: Usain Bolt; Yelena Isinbayeva
- World Marathon Majors winners: Martin Lel; Irina Mikitenko

This article contains an overview of the year 2008 in athletics

== International events ==
- 2008 Summer Olympics, held in Beijing, China
- African Championships, held in Addis Ababa, Ethiopia
- European Cup, super league held in Annecy, France
- World Indoor Championships, held in Valencia, Spain
- Golden League, held in various venues
- World Athletics Final, held in Stuttgart, Germany
- World Cross Country Championships, held in Edinburgh, United Kingdom
- World Road Running Championships, held in Rio de Janeiro, Brazil
- World Junior Championships, held in Bydgoszcz, Poland

== World records ==
=== Men ===
| Event | Performance | Athlete | Nation | Place | Date |
|---|---|---|---|---|---|
| 100 m | 9.72 | Usain Bolt | Jamaica | New York City, United States | May 31 |
| 100 m | 9.69 | Usain Bolt | Jamaica | Beijing, China | August 16 |
| 200 m | 19.30 | Usain Bolt | Jamaica | Beijing, China | August 20 |
| 4 × 100 m relay | 37.10 | Nesta Carter; Michael Frater; Usain Bolt; Asafa Powell | Jamaica | Beijing, China | August 22 |
| 110 m hurdles | 12.87 | Dayron Robles | Cuba | Ostrava, Czech Republic | June 12 |
| 50 km race walk | 3:34:14 | Denis Nizhegorodov | Russia | Cheboksary, Russia | May 11 |
| Marathon | 2:03:59 | Haile Gebrselassie | Ethiopia | Berlin, Germany | September 28 |

=== Women ===
| Event | Performance | Athlete | Nation | Place | Date |
|---|---|---|---|---|---|
| 5000 m | 14:11.15 | Tirunesh Dibaba | Ethiopia | Oslo, Norway | June 6 |
| One hour run | 18,517 m | Dire Tune | Ethiopia | Ostrava, Czech Republic | June 12 |
| 3000 m steeplechase | 8:58.81 | Gulnara Galkina-Samitova | Russia | Beijing, China | August 17 |
| Pole vault | 5.03 m | Yelena Isinbayeva | Russia | Rome, Italy | July 11 |
| Pole vault | 5.04 m | Yelena Isinbayeva | Russia | Monte Carlo, Monaco | July 29 |
| Pole vault | 5.05 m | Yelena Isinbayeva | Russia | Beijing, China | August 18 |
| Javelin throw | 72.28 | Barbora Špotáková | Czech Republic | Stuttgart, Germany | September 13 |

== Awards ==
=== Men ===
| Award | Winner |
|---|---|
| IAAF World Athlete of the Year | (Jamaica) Usain Bolt |
| Track & Field Athlete of the Year | (Jamaica) Usain Bolt |
| European Athlete of the Year | (Norway) Andreas Thorkildsen |
| European Athletics Rising Star | (Germany) Raphael Holzdeppe |

=== Women ===
| Award | Winner |
|---|---|
| IAAF World Athlete of the Year | (Russia) Yelena Isinbayeva |
| Track & Field Athlete of the Year | (Ethiopia) Tirunesh Dibaba |
| European Athlete of the Year | (Russia) Yelena Isinbayeva |
| European Athletics Rising Star | (United Kingdom) Stephanie Twell |

== Men's best year performances ==
=== 100 metres ===
| RANK | ATHLETE | TIME |
|---|---|---|
| 1. | Usain Bolt (JAM) | 9.69 WR |
| 2. | Asafa Powell (JAM) | 9.72 |
| 3. | Tyson Gay (USA) | 9.77 |
| 4. | Travis Padgett (USA) | 9.89 |
| 4. | Darvis Patton (USA) | 9.89 |
| 4. | Richard Thompson (TRI) | 9.89 |

=== 200 metres ===
| RANK | ATHLETE | TIME |
|---|---|---|
| 1. | Usain Bolt (JAM) | 19.30 WR |
| 2. | Walter Dix (USA) | 19.86 |
| 2. | Shawn Crawford (USA) | 19.86 |
| 4. | Wallace Spearmon (USA) | 19.90 |
| 5. | Rodney Martin (USA) | 19.99 |

=== 400 metres ===
| RANK | ATHLETE | TIME |
|---|---|---|
| 1. | LaShawn Merritt (USA) | 43.75 |
| 2. | Jeremy Wariner (USA) | 43.82 |
| 3. | Angelo Taylor (USA) | 44.38 |
| 4. | Chris Brown (BAH) | 44.40 |
| 5. | Martyn Rooney (GBR) | 44.60 |

=== 800 metres ===
| RANK | ATHLETE | TIME |
|---|---|---|
| 1. | Abubaker Kaki (SUD) | 1:42.69 |
| 2. | Yuriy Borzakovskiy (RUS) | 1:42.79 |
| 2. | Yusuf Saad Kamel (BHR) | 1:42.79 |
| 4. | Yeimer López (CUB) | 1:43.07 |
| 5. | Mbulaeni Mulaudzi (RSA) | 1:43.26 |

=== 1500 metres ===
| RANK | ATHLETE | TIME |
|---|---|---|
| 1. | Daniel Kipchirchir Komen (KEN) | 3:31.49 |
| 2. | Augustine Kiprono Choge (KEN) | 3:31.57 |
| 3. | Asbel Kipruto Kiprop (KEN) | 3:31.64 |
| 4. | Abdalaati Iguider (MAR) | 3:31.88 |
| 5. | Shedrack Kibet Korir (KEN) | 3:31.94 |

=== 3000 metres ===
| RANK | ATHLETE | TIME |
|---|---|---|
| 1. | Edwin Cheruiyot Soi (KEN) | 7:31.83 |
| 2. | Kenenisa Bekele (ETH) | 7:31.94 |
| 3. | Augustine Kiprono Choge (KEN) | 7:32.01 |
| 4. | Moses Ndiema Kipsiro (UGA) | 7:32.42 |
| 5. | Levy Matebo (KEN) | 7:33.01 |

=== 5000 metres ===
| RANK | ATHLETE | TIME |
|---|---|---|
| 1. | Kenenisa Bekele (ETH) | 12:50.18 |
| 2. | Moses Ndiema Masai (KEN) | 12:50.55 |
| 3. | Tariku Bekele (ETH) | 12:52.45 |
| 4. | Moses Ndiema Kipsiro (UGA) | 12:54.70 |
| 5. | Abreham Cherkos (ETH) | 12:57.56 |

=== 10,000 metres ===
| RANK | ATHLETE | TIME |
|---|---|---|
| 1. | Kenenisa Bekele (ETH) | 26:25.97 |
| 2. | Sileshi Sihine (ETH) | 26:50.53 |
| 3. | Haile Gebrselassie (ETH) | 26:51.20 |
| 4. | Eliud Kipchoge (KEN) | 26:54.32 |
| 5. | Leonard Komon (KEN) | 26:57.08 |

=== 110 metres hurdles ===
| RANK | ATHLETE | TIME |
|---|---|---|
| 1. | Dayron Robles (CUB) | 12.87 WR |
| 2. | David Oliver (USA) | 12.95 |
| 3. | Terrence Trammell (USA) | 13.08 |
| 4. | Antwon Hicks (USA) | 13.09 |
| 5. | Anwar Moore (USA) | 13.15 |

=== 400 metres hurdles ===
| RANK | ATHLETE | TIME |
|---|---|---|
| 1. | Angelo Taylor (USA) | 47.25 |
| 2. | Kerron Clement (USA) | 47.79 |
| 3. | Bershawn Jackson (USA) | 48.02 |
| 4. | L.J. van Zyl (RSA) | 48.22 |
| 5. | Danny McFarlane (JAM) | 48.30 |

=== 3000 metres steeplechase ===
| RANK | ATHLETE | TIME |
|---|---|---|
| 1. | Paul Kipsiele Koech (KEN) | 8:00.57 |
| 2. | Richard Kipkemboi Mateelong (KEN) | 8:07.64 |
| 3. | Tareq Mubarak Taher (BHR) | 8:08.53 |
| 4. | Mahiedine Mekhissi-Benabbad (FRA) | 8:08.95 |
| 5. | Michael Kipyego (KEN) | 8:09.05 |

=== Half marathon ===
| RANK | ATHLETE | TIME |
|---|---|---|
| 1. | Haile Gebrselassie (ETH) | 59:15 |
| 1. | Deriba Merga (ETH) | 59:15 |
| 3. | Wilson Kipsang Kiprotich (KEN) | 59:16 |
| 4. | Samuel Wanjiru (KEN) | 59:26 |
| 5. | Patrick Makau Musyoki (KEN) | 59:29 |
| 5. | Evans Kiprop Cheruiyot (KEN) | 59:29 |

=== Marathon ===
| RANK | ATHLETE | TIME |
|---|---|---|
| 1. | Haile Gebrselassie (ETH) | 2:03:59 WR |
| 2. | Martin Lel (KEN) | 2:05:15 |
| 3. | Samuel Wanjiru (KEN) | 2:05:24 |
| 4. | Abderrahim Goumri (MAR) | 2:05:30 |
| 5. | James Kipsang Kwambai (KEN) | 2:05:36 |

=== High jump ===
| RANK | ATHLETE | HEIGHT |
|---|---|---|
| 1. | Andrey Silnov (RUS) | 2.38 |
| 2. | Stefan Holm (SWE) | 2.37 |
| 3. | Dusty Jonas (USA) | 2.36 |
| 4. | Michał Bieniek (POL) | 2.35 |
| 5. | Kabelo Kgosiemang (BOT) | 2.34 |
| 5. | Germaine Mason (GBR) | 2.34 |
| 5. | Yaroslav Rybakov (RUS) | 2.34 |

=== Pole vault ===
| RANK | ATHLETE | HEIGHT |
|---|---|---|
| 1. | Brad Walker (USA) | 6.04 |
| 2. | Evgeniy Lukyanenko (RUS) | 6.01 |
| 3. | Steven Hooker (AUS) | 6.00 |
| 4. | Denys Yurchenko (UKR) | 5.83 |
| 5. | Maksym Mazuryk (UKR) | 5.82 |

=== Long jump ===
| RANK | ATHLETE | MARK |
|---|---|---|
| 1. | Irving Saladino (PAN) | 8.73 |
| 2. | Ibrahim Camejo (CUB) | 8.46 |
| 3. | Loúis Tsátoumas (GRE) | 8.44 |
| 4. | Mohamed Salman Al Khuwalidi (KSA) | 8.37 |
| 5. | Trevell Quinley (USA) | 8.36 |

=== Triple jump ===
| RANK | ATHLETE | MARK |
|---|---|---|
| 1. | Nelson Évora (POR) | 17.67 |
| 2. | Phillips Idowu (GBR) | 17.62 |
| 3. | Leevan Sands (BAH) | 17.59 |
| 4. | Arnie David Giralt (CUB) | 17.52 |
| 5. | Alexis Copello (CUB) | 17.50 |

=== Shot put ===
| RANK | ATHLETE | MARK |
|---|---|---|
| 1. | Adam Nelson (USA) | 22.12 |
| 2. | Reese Hoffa (USA) | 22.10 |
| 3. | Andrei Mikhnevich (BLR) | 22.00 |
| 4. | Christian Cantwell (USA) | 21.76 |
| 5. | Tomasz Majewski (POL) | 21.51 |

=== Javelin throw ===
| RANK | ATHLETE | MARK |
|---|---|---|
| 1. | Andreas Thorkildsen (NOR) | 90.57 |
| 2. | Jarrod Bannister (AUS) | 89.02 |
| 3. | Tero Pitkämäki (FIN) | 87.70 |
| 4. | Antti Ruuskanen (FIN) | 87.33 |
| 5. | Sergey Makarov (RUS) | 86.88 |

=== Discus throw ===
| RANK | ATHLETE | MARK |
|---|---|---|
| 1. | Gerd Kanter (EST) | 71.88 |
| 2. | Virgilijus Alekna (LTU) | 71.25 |
| 3. | Mario Pestano (ESP) | 69.50 |
| 4. | Ehsan Haddadi (IRI) | 69.32 |
| 5. | Ian Waltz (USA) | 68.90 |

=== Hammer throw ===
| RANK | ATHLETE | MARK |
|---|---|---|
| 1. | Ivan Tsikhan (BLR) | 84.51 |
| 2. | Primož Kozmus (SLO) | 82.02 |
| 3. | Krisztián Pars (HUN) | 81.96 |
| 4. | Koji Murofushi (JPN) | 81.87 |
| 5. | Vadim Devyatovskiy (BLR) | 81.70 |

=== Decathlon ===
| RANK | ATHLETE | POINTS |
|---|---|---|
| 1. | Bryan Clay (USA) | 8832 |
| 2. | Andrei Krauchanka (BLR) | 8585 |
| 3. | Trey Hardee (USA) | 8534 |
| 4. | Leonel Suárez (CUB) | 8527 |
| 5. | Tom Pappas (USA) | 8511 |

== Women's best year performances ==
=== 100 metres ===
| RANK | ATHLETE | TIME |
|---|---|---|
| 1. | Torri Edwards (USA) | 10.78 |
| 1. | Shelly-Ann Fraser (JAM) | 10.78 |
| 3. | Kerron Stewart (JAM) | 10.80 |
| 4. | Muna Lee (USA) | 10.85 |
| 5. | Sherone Simpson (JAM) | 10.87 |
| 5. | Veronica Campbell Brown (JAM) | 10.87 |

=== 200 metres ===
| RANK | ATHLETE | TIME |
|---|---|---|
| 1. | Veronica Campbell Brown (JAM) | 21.74 |
| 2. | Allyson Felix (USA) | 21.93 |
| 3. | Kerron Stewart (JAM) | 21.99 |
| 4. | Muna Lee (USA) | 22.01 |
| 5. | Sherone Simpson (JAM) | 22.11 |

=== 400 metres ===
| RANK | ATHLETE | TIME |
|---|---|---|
| 1. | Christine Ohuruogu (GBR) | 49.62 |
| 2. | Shericka Williams (JAM) | 49.69 |
| 3. | Sanya Richards (USA) | 49.74 |
| 4. | Amantle Montsho (BOT) | 49.83 |
| 4. | Allyson Felix (USA) | 49.83 |

=== 800 metres ===
| RANK | ATHLETE | TIME |
|---|---|---|
| 1. | Pamela Jelimo (KEN) | 1:54.01 |
| 2. | Yelena Soboleva (RUS) | 1:54.85 |
| 3. | Tatyana Andrianova (RUS) | 1:56.00 |
| 4. | Janeth Jepkosgei (KEN) | 1:56.07 |
| 5. | Svetlana Klyuka (RUS) | 1:56.64 |

=== 1500 metres ===
| RANK | ATHLETE | TIME |
|---|---|---|
| 1. | Yelena Soboleva (RUS) | 3:56.59 |
| 2. | Tatyana Tomashova (RUS) | 3:59.42 |
| 3. | Maryam Yusuf Jamal (BHR) | 3:59.84 |
| 4. | Nancy Jebet Lagat (KEN) | 4:00.23 |
| 5. | Shannon Rowbury (USA) | 4:00.33 |

=== 3000 metres ===
| RANK | ATHLETE | TIME |
|---|---|---|
| 1. | Vivian Cheruiyot (KEN) | 8:33.66 |
| 2. | Wude Ayalew (ETH) | 8:35.50 |
| 3. | Dolores Checa (ESP) | 8:37.78 |
| 4. | Peninah Jepchumba (KEN) | 8:40.12 |
| 5. | Priscah Jepleting Cherono (KEN) | 8:42.04 |

=== 5000 metres ===
| RANK | ATHLETE | TIME |
|---|---|---|
| 1. | Tirunesh Dibaba (ETH) | 14:11.15 WR |
| 2. | Meseret Defar (ETH) | 14:12.88 |
| 3. | Liliya Shobukhova (RUS) | 14:23.75 |
| 4. | Vivian Cheruiyot (KEN) | 14:25.43 |
| 5. | Gulnara Samitova-Galkina (RUS) | 14:33.13 |

=== 10,000 metres ===
| RANK | ATHLETE | TIME |
|---|---|---|
| 1. | Tirunesh Dibaba (ETH) | 29:54.66 |
| 2. | Elvan Abeylegesse (TUR) | 29:56.34 |
| 3. | Shalane Flanagan (USA) | 30:22.22 |
| 4. | Linet Masai (KEN) | 30:26.50 |
| 5. | Kimberley Smith (NZL) | 30:35.54 |

=== 100 metres hurdles ===
| RANK | ATHLETE | TIME |
|---|---|---|
| 1. | Lolo Jones (USA) | 12.43 |
| 2. | Damu Cherry (USA) | 12.47 |
| 3. | Brigitte Foster-Hylton (JAM) | 12.49 |
| 4. | Josephine Onyia (ESP) | 12.50 |
| 5. | Sally McLellan (AUS) | 12.53 |

=== 400 metres hurdles ===
| RANK | ATHLETE | TIME |
|---|---|---|
| 1. | Melaine Walker (JAM) | 52.64 |
| 2. | Tiffany Williams (USA) | 53.54 |
| 3. | Sheena Tosta (USA) | 53.58 |
| 4. | Tasha Danvers (GBR) | 53.84 |
| 5. | Anastasiya Rabchenyuk (UKR) | 53.96 |

=== 3000 metres steeplechase ===
| RANK | ATHLETE | TIME |
|---|---|---|
| 1. | Gulnara Samitova-Galkina (RUS) | 8:58.81 WR |
| 2. | Eunice Jepkorir (KEN) | 9:07.41 |
| 3. | Yekaterina Volkova (RUS) | 9:07.64 |
| 4. | Tatyana Petrova (RUS) | 9:12.33 |
| 5. | Cristina Casandra (ROU) | 9:16.85 |

=== Half marathon ===
| RANK | ATHLETE | TIME |
|---|---|---|
| 1. | Philes Ongori (KEN) | 1:07:57 |
| 2. | Yukiko Akaba (JPN) | 1:08:11 |
| 3. | Aselefech Mergia (ETH) | 1:08:17 |
| 4. | Genet Getaneh (ETH) | 1:08:18 |
| 5. | Peninah Arusei (KEN) | 1:08:20 |

=== Marathon ===
| RANK | ATHLETE | TIME |
|---|---|---|
| 1. | Irina Mikitenko (GER) | 2:19:19 |
| 2. | Askale Tafa (ETH) | 2:21:31 |
| 3. | Zhang Yingying (CHN) | 2:22:38 |
| 4. | Berhane Adere (ETH) | 2:22:42 |
| 5. | Galina Bogomolova (RUS) | 2:22:53 |

=== High jump ===
| RANK | ATHLETE | HEIGHT |
|---|---|---|
| 1. | Blanka Vlašić (CRO) | 2.06 |
| 2. | Tia Hellebaut (BEL) | 2.05 |
| 3. | Anna Chicherova (RUS) | 2.04 |
| 4. | Ariane Friedrich (GER) | 2.03 |
| 4. | Elena Slesarenko (RUS) | 2.03 |

=== Pole vault ===
| RANK | ATHLETE | HEIGHT |
|---|---|---|
| 1. | Yelena Isinbayeva (RUS) | 5.05 WR |
| 2. | Jennifer Stuczynski (USA) | 4.92 |
| 3. | Fabiana Murer (BRA) | 4.80 |
| 4. | Monika Pyrek (POL) | 4.75 |
| 4. | Svetlana Feofanova (RUS) | 4.75 |
| 4. | Yuliya Golubchikova (RUS) | 4.75 |

=== Long jump ===
| RANK | ATHLETE | MARK |
|---|---|---|
| 1. | Naide Gomes (POR) | 7.12 |
| 2. | Lyudmila Kolchanova (RUS) | 7.04 |
| 2. | Maurren Maggi (BRA) | 7.04 |
| 4. | Tatyana Lebedeva (RUS) | 7.03 |
| 5. | Brittney Reese (USA) | 6.95 |

=== Triple jump ===
| RANK | ATHLETE | MARK |
|---|---|---|
| 1. | Françoise Mbango Etone (CMR) | 15.39 |
| 2. | Tatyana Lebedeva (RUS) | 15.32 |
| 3. | Hrysopiyi Devetzi (GRE) | 15.23 |
| 4. | Yargelis Savigne (CUB) | 15.20 |
| 5. | Olga Rypakova (KAZ) | 15.11 |

=== Shot put ===
| RANK | ATHLETE | MARK |
|---|---|---|
| 1. | Nadzeya Ostapchuk (BLR) | 20.98 |
| 2. | Natallia Mikhnevich (BLR) | 20.70 |
| 3. | Valerie Vili (NZL) | 20.56 |
| 4. | Nadine Kleinert (GER) | 19.89 |
| 5. | Yulia Leantsiuk (BLR) | 19.79 |

=== Javelin throw ===
| RANK | ATHLETE | MARK |
|---|---|---|
| 1. | Barbora Špotáková (CZE) | 72.28 WR |
| 2. | Mariya Abakumova (RUS) | 70.78 |
| 3. | Christina Obergföll (GER) | 69.81 |
| 4. | Steffi Nerius (GER) | 68.34 |
| 5. | Linda Stahl (GER) | 66.06 |

=== Discus throw ===
| RANK | ATHLETE | MARK |
|---|---|---|
| 1. | Iryna Yatchenko (BLR) | 67.89 |
| 2. | Darya Pishchalnikova (RUS) | 67.28 |
| 3. | Nicoleta Grasu (ROU) | 66.51 |
| 4. | Stephanie Brown-Trafton (USA) | 66.17 |
| 5. | Yarelis Barrios (CUB) | 66.13 |

=== Hammer throw ===
| RANK | ATHLETE | MARK |
|---|---|---|
| 1. | Aksana Miankova (BLR) | 77.32 |
| 2. | Martina Hrasnová (SVK) | 76.82 |
| 3. | Yipsi Moreno (CUB) | 76.62 |
| 4. | Darya Pchelnik (BLR) | 76.33 |
| 5. | Gulfiya Khanafeyeva (RUS) | 75.07 |

=== Heptathlon ===
| RANK | ATHLETE | POINTS |
|---|---|---|
| 1. | Nataliya Dobrynska (UKR) | 6733 |
| 2. | Hyleas Fountain (USA) | 6667 |
| 3. | Tatyana Chernova (RUS) | 6618 |
| 4. | Lyudmyla Blonska (UKR) | 6570 |
| 5. | Olga Kurban (RUS) | 6559 |

== Deaths ==
- June 9 — Peter Rwamuhanda (54), Ugandan hurdler (b. 1953)
- December 22 — Jani Lehtonen (40), Finnish pole vaulter (b. 1968)
