= 2009 World Championships in Athletics – Men's triple jump =

The men's triple jump at the 2009 World Championships in Athletics was held at the Olympic Stadium on 16 and 18 August. The season had seen a number of athletes performing to a high level before the championships, with reigning World and Olympic champion Nelson Évora leading with 17.66 metres and all three athletes of the Cuban team having jumped over 17.60 m in the season. The other athlete to jump that distance was Phillips Idowu, who was keen make up for his loss to Évora in the 2008 Olympics. The Olympic medallists Évora, Idowu, and Leevan Sands, and the Cuban trio of David Giralt, Yoandris Betanzos and Alexis Copello, were judged to be the strongest competitors entering the competition.

In the qualifying rounds, Évora and Idowu were the first to pass the automatic qualifying mark of 17.15 metres, recording bests of 17.44 and 17.32 m respectively. Chinese jumper Li Yanxi was the third through the qualifying mark, and Sands and Giralt soon followed. The qualifying was not of the same standard as the 2008 Olympic final, as Copello and Dmitrij Valukevic rounded out the top twelve competitors with jumps under 17 m.

In the final, Olympic champion Évora set the standard with a first jump of 17.54 m, Idowu also started well with a jump of 17.51 m. Giralt and Sands moved into third and fourth with jumps around the 17.2 m mark. Évora led the competition until round three, where Idowu produced a personal best and world-leading jump of 17.73 m to take the top spot. A large jump by Alexis Copello followed, but he was given the red flag, indicating a foul. Sands' season's best jump of 17.32 m moved him into the third medal spot, but it was Copello's final jump of 17.36 m that took the bronze medal. Évora's best also came in the final round, but the 17.55-metre jump did not rival that of Idowu. It was the thirty-one-year-old Briton's first ever major title, building on his silver medal at the 2008 Beijing Olympics.

== Medalists ==
| Gold | Phillips Idowu; Great Britain & N.I. (GBR) |
| Silver | Nelson Évora; Portugal (POR) |
| Bronze | Alexis Copello; Cuba (CUB) |

== Records ==
Prior to the competition, the following records were as follows.

| World record | Jonathan Edwards (GBR) | 18.29 | Gothenburg, Sweden | 7 August 1995 |
| Championship record | Jonathan Edwards (GBR) | 18.29 | Gothenburg, Sweden | 7 August 1995 |
| World leading | Nelson Évora (POR) | 17.66 | Belém, Brazil | 24 May 2009 |
| African record | Tarik Bouguetaïb (MAR) | 17.37 | Khemisset, Morocco | 14 July 2007 |
| Asian record | Oleg Sakirkin (KAZ) | 17.35 | Moscow, Russia | 5 June 1994 |
| North American record | Kenny Harrison (USA) | 18.09 | Atlanta, United States | 27 July 1996 |
| South American record | Jadel Gregório (BRA) | 17.90 | Belém, Brazil | 20 May 2007 |
| European record | Jonathan Edwards (GBR) | 18.29 | Gothenburg, Sweden | 7 August 1995 |
| Oceanian record | Ken Lorraway (AUS) | 17.46 | London, United Kingdom | 7 August 1982 |

- Phillips Idowu beat Évora's world leading mark in the competition, jumping 17.73 metres.

== Qualification standards ==
| A standard | B standard |
|---|---|
| 17.10m | 16.65m |

== Schedule ==
| Date | Time | Round |
|---|---|---|
| 16 August 2009 | 19:00 | Qualification |
| 18 August 2009 | 18:05 | Final |

== Results ==
=== Qualification ===
Qualification: Qualifying Performance 17.15 (Q) or at least 12 best performers (q) advance to the final.

| Rank | Group | Athlete | Nationality | #1 | #2 | #3 | Result | Notes |
|---|---|---|---|---|---|---|---|---|
| 1 | B | Nelson Évora | Portugal | 17.44 | | | 17.44 | Q |
| 2 | A | Phillips Idowu | Great Britain & N.I. | 17.10 | 17.32 | | 17.32 | Q |
| 3 | B | Li Yanxi | China | 16.78 | 17.27 | | 17.27 | Q, SB |
| 4 | A | Leevan Sands | Bahamas | 17.02 | 16.84 | 17.20 | 17.20 | Q, SB |
| 5 | A | Arnie David Giralt | Cuba | 16.92 | x | 17.15 | 17.15 | Q |
| 6 | B | Teddy Tamgho | France | x | 17.11 | x | 17.11 | q, SB |
| 7 | A | Momchil Karailiev | Bulgaria | x | 16.87 | 17.07 | 17.07 | q |
| 8 | B | Jadel Gregório | Brazil | 17.06 | x | 15.48 | 17.06 | q |
| 9 | A | Igor Spasovkhodskiy | Russia | 16.87 | 16.84 | 17.02 | 17.02 | q |
| 10 | A | Nathan Douglas | Great Britain & N.I. | 17.00 | x | 16.90 | 17.00 | q |
| 11 | B | Alexis Copello | Cuba | 16.99 | 16.78 | 16.98 | 16.99 | q |
| 12 | A | Dmitrij Valukevic | Slovakia | 16.96 | 16.69 | 16.85 | 16.96 | q |
| 13 | A | Onochie Achike | Great Britain & N.I. | 16.88 | 16.94 | x | 16.94 | |
| 14 | B | Brandon Roulhac | United States | 16.78 | 16.56 | 16.94 | 16.94 | |
| 15 | A | Fabrizio Schembri | Italy | 16.88 | 16.88 | x | 16.88 | |
| 16 | B | Tosin Oke | Nigeria | 16.87 | 16.82 | x | 16.87 | PB |
| 17 | A | Yoandris Betanzos | Cuba | x | x | 16.77 | 16.77 | |
| 18 | B | Randy Lewis | Grenada | 16.73 | 13.38 | 16.52 | 16.73 | |
| 19 | B | Mykola Savolaynen | Ukraine | 16.68 | 16.64 | 16.72 | 16.72 | |
| 20 | B | Hugo Chila | Ecuador | 16.34 | 16.70 | 16.52 | 16.70 | NR |
| 21 | B | Hugo Mamba-Schlick | Cameroon | 16.21 | 16.06 | 16.63 | 16.63 | SB |
| 22 | B | Walter Davis | United States | 16.27 | 16.62 | 15.87 | 16.62 | |
| 23 | A | Dzmitry Dziatsuk | Belarus | 16.58 | 16.15 | x | 16.58 | |
| 24 | A | Kim Deok-Hyeon | South Korea | x | 16.02 | 16.58 | 16.58 | |
| 25 | B | Alwyn Jones | Australia | 16.20 | 16.57 | 16.50 | 16.57 | |
| 26 | A | Yevhen Semenenko | Ukraine | 16.29 | 16.52 | 16.54 | 16.54 | |
| 27 | A | Julian Reid | Jamaica | 16.41 | 16.49 | 16.16 | 16.49 | |
| 28 | A | Jefferson Sabino | Brazil | x | 16.24 | 16.34 | 16.34 | |
| 29 | A | Samyr Lainé | Haiti | x | 16.06 | 16.34 | 16.34 | |
| 30 | A | Kenta Bell | United States | x | 16.32 | 16.18 | 16.32 | |
| 31 | B | Viktor Yastrebov | Ukraine | x | 16.31 | 16.15 | 16.31 | |
| 32 | B | Evgeniy Plotnir | Russia | 16.13 | 16.29 | 15.96 | 16.29 | |
| 33 | B | Dimitrios Tsiamis | Greece | 15.68 | 16.23 | x | 16.23 | |
| 34 | B | Daniele Greco | Italy | 16.18 | x | x | 16.18 | |
| 35 | B | Yevgeniy Ektov | Kazakhstan | 16.13 | x | 16.01 | 16.13 | |
| 36 | B | Mantas Dilys | Lithuania | 16.09 | 16.02 | 15.70 | 16.09 | |
| 37 | A | Mohamed Youssef Salman | Bahrain | x | 16.05 | 15.71 | 16.05 | |
| 38 | B | Lauri Leis | Estonia | 15.28 | 15.98 | 15.84 | 15.98 | |
| 39 | B | Leonardo Elisiario dos Santos | Brazil | 15.95 | x | 15.85 | 15.95 | |
| 40 | A | Vladimir Letnicov | Moldova | 15.28 | 15.77 | 15.88 | 15.88 | |
| 41 | A | Fabrizio Donato | Italy | 15.81 | x | x | 15.81 | SB |
| 42 | A | Andrés Capellán | Spain | 15.35 | 15.80 | 15.67 | 15.80 | |
| 43 | B | Nguyen Van Hung | Vietnam | x | 15.03 | 15.56 | 15.56 | |
| 44 | B | Si Kuan Wong | Macau | x | 14.78 | 14.71 | 14.78 | |
| | A | Charles Friedek | Germany | x | x | x | NM | |
| | A | Yochai Halevi | Israel | | | | DNS | |

Key: NR = National record, PB = Personal best, Q = qualification by place in heat, q = qualification by overall place, SB = Seasonal best

=== Final ===
| Rank | Athlete | Nationality | #1 | #2 | #3 | #4 | #5 | #6 | Result | Notes |
|---|---|---|---|---|---|---|---|---|---|---|
| 1st place, gold medalist(s) | Phillips Idowu | Great Britain & N.I. | 17.51 | 17.44 | 17.73 | x | x | x | 17.73 | WL |
| 2nd place, silver medalist(s) | Nelson Évora | Portugal | 17.54 | x | 17.38 | x | 17.33 | 17.55 | 17.55 | |
| 3rd place, bronze medalist(s) | Alexis Copello | Cuba | 17.06 | 17.19 | 14.82 | x | 17.04 | 17.36 | 17.36 | |
| 4 | Leevan Sands | Bahamas | 17.20 | 17.08 | 16.96 | 17.05 | 17.32 | 16.99 | 17.32 | SB |
| 5 | Arnie David Giralt | Cuba | 17.26 | 17.18 | x | 17.19 | 17.01 | 17.06 | 17.26 | |
| 6 | Li Yanxi | China | 16.95 | 16.92 | 14.23 | 17.23 | x | 16.75 | 17.23 | |
| 7 | Igor Spasovkhodskiy | Russia | 16.73 | 16.91 | 14.66 | 14.75 | 16.37 | x | 16.91 | |
| 8 | Jadel Gregório | Brazil | x | 16.89 | 16.84 | 16.70 | x | x | 16.89 | |
| 9 | Momchil Karailiev | Bulgaria | 16.82 | 16.78 | 16.81 | | | | 16.82 | |
| 10 | Nathan Douglas | Great Britain & N.I. | 16.78 | 15.44 | 16.79 | | | | 16.79 | |
| 11 | Teddy Tamgho | France | x | 16.79 | x | | | | 16.79 | |
| 12 | Dmitrij Valukevic | Slovakia | x | x | 16.54 | | | | 16.54 | |

Key: SB = Seasonal best, WL = World leading (in a given season)
