= 2007 World Championships in Athletics – Men's triple jump =

The men's triple jump event at the 2007 World Championships in Athletics took place on August 25, 2007 (qualification) and August 27, 2007 (final) at the Nagai Stadium in Osaka, Japan.

== Medallists ==
| Gold | Nelson Évora; Portugal (POR) |
| Silver | Jadel Gregório; Brazil (BRA) |
| Bronze | Walter Davis; United States (USA) |

== Records ==
| World Record | Jonathan Edwards (GBR) | 18.29 | Gothenburg, Sweden | 7 August 1995 |
| Championship record | Jonathan Edwards (GBR) | 18.29 | Gothenburg, Sweden | 7 August 1995 |

== Qualification ==
=== Group A ===
| Place | Athlete | Nation | Mark | Notes |
|---|---|---|---|---|
| 1 | Nelson Évora | Portugal | 17.22 | Q |
| 2 | Jadel Gregório | Brazil | 17.10 | Q |
| 3 | Walter Davis | United States | 17.10 | Q |
| 4 | Aleksandr Petrenko | Russia | 17.05 | q |
| 5 | Osniel Tosca | Cuba | 16.74 | q |
| 6 | Alexander Martínez | Switzerland | 16.71 | q |
| 7 | Zhong Minwei | China | 16.69 | q |
| 8 | Dmitrij Valukevic | Slovakia | 16.65 | |
| 9 | Li Yanxi | China | 16.57 | |
| 10 | Vyktor Yastrebov | Ukraine | 16.57 | |
| 11 | Julien Kapek | France | 16.55 | |
| 12 | Anders Møller | Denmark | 16.39 | SB |
| 13 | Renjith Maheshwary | India | 16.38 | |
| 14 | Konstadinos Zalaggitis | Greece | 16.26 | |
| 15 | Kenta Bell | United States | 16.22 | |
| 16 | Takanori Sugibayashi | Japan | 16.21 | |
| — | Mohammad Hazzory | Syria | DNS | |
| — | Ndiss Kaba Badji | Senegal | DNS | |

=== Group B ===
| Place | Athlete | Nation | Mark | Notes |
|---|---|---|---|---|
| 1 | Phillips Idowu | Great Britain & N.I. | 17.07 | q |
| 2 | Aarik Wilson | United States | 17.06 | q |
| 3 | Arnie David Giralt | Cuba | 17.05 | q |
| 4 | Kim Deok-Hyeon | South Korea | 16.78 | q |
| 5 | Dimitrios Tsiamis | Greece | 16.74 | q |
| 6 | Gu Junjie | China | 16.58 | |
| 7 | Mykola Savolaynen | Ukraine | 16.58 | |
| 8 | Lawrence Willis | United States | 16.55 | |
| 9 | Yoandri Betanzos | Cuba | 16.54 | |
| 10 | Leevan Sands | Bahamas | 16.53 | |
| 11 | Anton Andersson | Sweden | 16.48 | |
| 12 | Danil Burkenya | Russia | 16.47 | |
| 13 | Tarik Bougtaïb | Morocco | 16.45 | |
| 14 | Jefferson Sabino | Brazil | 16.34 | |
| 15 | Hugo Mamba-Schlick | Cameroon | 16.24 | |
| 16 | Fabrizio Donato | Italy | 16.20 | |
| 17 | Leonardo dos Santos | Brazil | 15.74 | |
| — | Marian Oprea | Romania | DNS | |

== Final ==
| Place | Athlete | Nation | Mark | Notes |
|---|---|---|---|---|
| 1st place, gold medalist(s) | Nelson Évora | Portugal | 17.74 | NR |
| 2nd place, silver medalist(s) | Jadel Gregório | Brazil | 17.59 | |
| 3rd place, bronze medalist(s) | Walter Davis | United States | 17.33 | SB |
| 4 | Osniel Tosca | Cuba | 17.32 | |
| 5 | Aarik Wilson | United States | 17.31 | |
| 6 | Phillips Idowu | Great Britain & N.I. | 17.09 | |
| 7 | Arnie David Giralt | Cuba | 16.91 | |
| 8 | Alexander Martínez | Switzerland | 16.85 | |
| 9 | Kim Deok-Hyeon | South Korea | 16.71 | |
| 10 | Aleksandr Petrenko | Russia | 16.66 | |
| 11 | Zhong Minwei | China | 16.66 | |
| 12 | Dimitrios Tsiamis | Greece | 16.59 | |
