= 2007 European Athletics Indoor Championships – Men's triple jump =

The Men's triple jump event at the 2007 European Athletics Indoor Championships was held on March 2–3.

== Medalists ==
Gold	Silver	Bronze
Phillips Idowu; Great Britain	Nathan Douglas; Great Britain	Aleksandr Sergeyev; Russia

== Results ==
=== Qualification ===
Qualifying perf. 16.90 (Q) or 8 best performers (q) advanced to the Final.

Rank	Athlete	Nationality	#1	#2	#3	Result	Note
1	Nathan Douglas	Great Britain	X	16.46	16.96	16.96	Q
2	Evgeniy Plotnir	Russia	X	X	16.84	16.84	q
3	Phillips Idowu	Great Britain	16.82	–	–	16.82	q
4	Nelson Évora	Portugal	16.33	16.78	–	16.78	q
5	Aleksandr Petrenko	Russia	16.46	16.55	16.74	16.74	q
6	Aleksandr Sergeyev	Russia	16.38	16.68	15.90	16.68	q
7	Viktor Kuznyetsov	Ukraine	16.51	16.53	16.59	16.59	q
8	Mykola Savolaynen	Ukraine	16.42	16.41	16.56	16.56	q
9	Michaël Velter	Belgium	16.52	16.45	16.34	16.52	
10	Petar Ivanov	Bulgaria	16.45	15.88	16.44	16.45	
11	Andreas Pohle	Germany	15.67	16.38	16.26	16.38	
12	Jaanus Uudmäe	Estonia	16.12	16.25	16.35	16.35	
13	Benjamin Compaore	France	X	16.19	X	16.19	
14	Andrés Capellán	Spain	15.81	16.13	15.77	16.13	
15	Anders Møller	Denmark	X	16.04	15.47	16.04	
16	Karl Taillepierre	France	X	15.87	X	15.87	
17	Paweł Kruhlik	Poland	15.42	X	15.78	15.78	
18	Mantas Dilys	Lithuania	15.65	X	X	15.65	
19	Selman Redzep	Macedonia	13.99	X	14.07	14.07	

=== Final ===
Rank	Athlete	Nationality	#1	#2	#3	#4	#5	#6	Result	Note
1st place, gold medalist(s)	Phillips Idowu	Great Britain	17.56	17.25	–	14.12	16.47	X	17.56	SB
2nd place, silver medalist(s)	Nathan Douglas	Great Britain	17.08	17.22	17.47	X	17.41	X	17.47	PB
3rd place, bronze medalist(s)	Aleksandr Sergeyev	Russia	16.80	X	16.60	17.11	17.15	17.12	17.15	SB
4	Mykola Savolaynen	Ukraine	16.71	16.87	16.78	16.68	16.38	16.98	16.98	SB
5	Nelson Évora	Portugal	X	16.97	–	–	X	–	16.97	
6	Aleksandr Petrenko	Russia	16.52	16.70	16.77	X	16.96	16.89	16.96	
7	Viktor Kuznyetsov	Ukraine	16.83	16.86	14.60	16.92	14.79	–	16.92	PB
8	Evgeniy Plotnir	Russia	16.56	16.85	X	X	X	16.65	16.85	
