= Athletics at the 2007 Pan American Games – Men's triple jump =

Men's triple jump at the Pan American Games

The men's triple jump event at the 2007 Pan American Games was held on July 28.

== Results ==
Rank	Athlete	Nationality	#1	#2	#3	#4	#5	#6	Result	Notes
1st place, gold medalist(s)	Jadel Gregorio	Brazil	17.04	17.27	–	17.15	–	17.09	17.27	
2nd place, silver medalist(s)	Osniel Tosca	Cuba	16.00	16.78	16.65	16.18	16.37	16.92	16.92	
3rd place, bronze medalist(s)	Yoandris Betanzos	Cuba	x	16.75	16.01	16.56	x	16.90	16.90	
4	Jefferson Sabino	Brazil	16.79	16.81	16.57	x	x	16.76	16.81	SB
5	Lawrence Willis	United States	16.72	16.05	16.38	16.36	x	15.38	16.72	
6	Leevan Sands	Bahamas	16.59	16.67	16.65	15.10	x	16.15	16.67	
7	Randy Lewis	Grenada	16.42	x	16.40	x	x	x	16.42	
8	Ayata Joseph	Antigua and Barbuda	15.66	x	15.73	15.33	x	–	15.73	
9	Hugo Chila	Ecuador	14.69	15.71	14.26				15.71	
10	Samyr Lainé	Haiti	15.10	15.45	13.79				15.45	
11	Keita Cline	British Virgin Islands	x	14.37	14.02				14.37	SB
	LeJuan Simon	Trinidad and Tobago	x	x	x				NM	
	Allen Simms	Puerto Rico							DNS	
