= Alexis Copello =

Cuban-Azerbaijani triple jumper

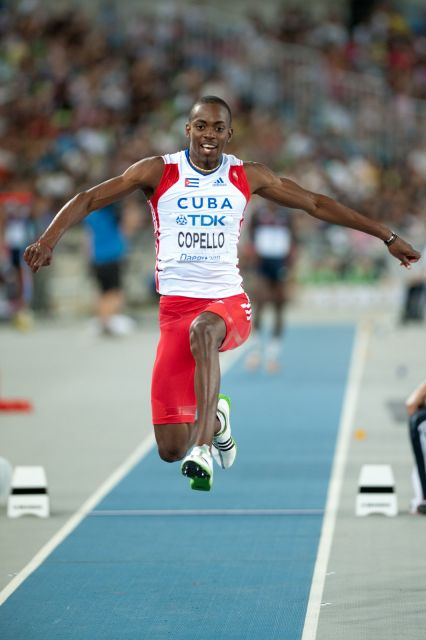
- Copello at the 2011 World Championships Athletics in Daegu.

Personal information
- Full name: Alexis Copello Sánchez
- Citizenship: Cuba (birth), Azerbaijan (24 April 2017)
- Born: August 12, 1985 (age 41) Santiago de Cuba, Santiago de Cuba, Cuba
- Height: 1.85 m (6.1 ft) (2007)
- Weight: 80 kg (176 lb) (2007)

Sport
- Country: Cuba (until 2017); Azerbaijan (after 2017)
- Sport: Triple jumper

Achievements and titles
- Personal best: 17.68 metres (58.0 ft)
Medal record
Men's athletics
Representing Cuba
World Championships
Bronze medal – third place	2009 Berlin	Triple jump
Pan American Games
Gold medal – first place	2011 Guadalajara	Triple jump
Continental Cup
Silver medal – second place	2010 Split	Triple jump
Representing Azerbaijan
European Championships
Silver medal – second place	2018 Berlin	Triple jump
European Indoor Championships
Silver medal – second place	2021 Toruń	Triple jump
- Updated on 21 June 2013

Alexis Copello (Azerbaijani: Aleksis Kopello; born August 12, 1985) is a Cuban-Azerbaijani triple jumper who since 2017 competes internationally for Azerbaijan. He has a (legal) personal best jump of 17.68 metres (58.0 ft). He is a World Championship medalist, having won the bronze at the 2009 World Championships in Athletics. He is 1.85 metres (6 ft 1 in) tall and weighs 80 kilograms (176 lbs).

His international career began with success at regional level: he won a silver medal in the triple jump at the 2006 Central American and Caribbean Games and a bronze medal at the 2008 Central American and Caribbean Championships. Copello represented Cuba at the 2008 Summer Olympics in Beijing. Despite being a front runner, he only reached eighth place in Group A (thirteenth place overall) with a jump of 17.09 metres (56.1 ft).

He won the gold at the 2009 Central American and Caribbean Championships and set a championship record of 17.33 m. Copello won a bronze medal in the 12th IAAF World Championships in Athletics in Berlin with a jump of 17.36 metres (57.0 ft) on 18 August 2009, displacing Leevan Sands and only bested by Phillips Idowu and Nelson Évora.

On 30 March 2017, he officially switched his allegiance to Azerbaijan.

== Personal bests ==
Copello's best indoor jump is 17.24 metres (56.6 ft) in Lievin on 5 March 2010, and his best legal outdoor jump is 17.68 metres (58.0 ft) in Avila on 17 July 2011. For comparison, the world record is 18.29 metres (60.0 ft).

== Competition record ==
Year	Competition	Venue	Position	Event	Notes
Representing Cuba
2005	ALBA Games	Havana, Cuba	2nd	Triple jump	16.57 m (wind: +0.3 m/s)
2005	Central American and Caribbean Championships	Nassau, Bahamas	4th	Triple Jump	17.09 m w (wind: +2.6 m/s)
2006	Central American and Caribbean Games	Cartagena, Colombia	2nd	Triple Jump	16.85 m (wind: +0.7 m/s)
2008	Central American and Caribbean Championships	Cali, Colombia	3rd	Triple Jump	16.91 m (wind: -2.1 m/s)
2008	Olympic Games	Beijing, China	13th (q)	Triple Jump	17.09 m (wind: +0.6 m/s)
2009	ALBA Games	Havana, Cuba	1st	Triple jump	17.69 m (wind: +3.9 m/s)
2009	Central American and Caribbean Championships	Havana, Cuba	1st	Triple Jump	17.33 m (wind: -0.1 m/s)
2009	World Championships	Berlin, Germany	3rd	Triple Jump	17.36 m (wind: -0.1 m/s)
2010	Ibero-American Championships	San Fernando, Spain	1st	Triple Jump	17.28 m (wind: +1.1 m/s)
2011	World Championships	Daegu, South Korea	4th	Triple Jump	17.47 m (wind: +0.1 m/s)
2011	Pan American Games	Guadalajara, Mexico	1st	Triple Jump	17.21 m (wind: -1.3 m/s)
2012	World Indoor Championships	Istanbul, Turkey	7th	Triple Jump	16.92 m
2012	Olympic Games	London, United Kingdom	8th	Triple Jump	16.92 m (wind: +0.5 m/s)
Representing Azerbaijan
2017	Islamic Solidarity Games	Baku, Azerbaijan	2nd	Triple jump	16.90 m
2017	World Championships	London, United Kingdom	5th	Triple jump	17.16 m
2018	World Indoor Championships	Birmingham, United Kingdom	4th	Triple jump	17.17 m
2018	European Championships	Berlin, Germany	2nd	Triple jump	16.93 m
2019	World Championships	Doha, Qatar	7th	Triple jump	17.10 m
2021	European Indoor Championships	Toruń, Poland	2nd	Triple jump	17.04 m
2022	Islamic Solidarity Games	Konya, Turkey	2nd	Triple jump	16.40 m
2022	European Championships	Munich, Germany	–	Triple jump	NM
2023	World Championships	Budapest, Hungary	–	Triple jump	NM
2024	European Championships	Rome, Italy	13th (q)	Triple jump	16.44 m

== See also ==
- Cuba at the 2008 Summer Olympics
