= 2010 European Athletics Championships – Men's triple jump =

Men's triple jump at the European Athletics Championships

The men's triple jump at the 2010 European Athletics Championships was held at the Estadi Olímpic Lluís Companys on 27 and 29 July.

== Medalists ==
Gold	(United Kingdom) Phillips Idowu; Great Britain (GBR)
Silver	Marian Oprea; Romania (ROU)
Bronze	Teddy Tamgho; France (FRA)

== Records ==
Standing records prior to the 2010 European Athletics Championships
World record	Jonathan Edwards (GBR)	18.29	Gothenburg, Sweden	7 August 1995
European record	Jonathan Edwards (GBR)	18.29	Gothenburg, Sweden	7 August 1995
Championship record	Jonathan Edwards (GBR)	17.99	Budapest, Hungary	23 August 1998
World Leading	Teddy Tamgho (FRA)	17.98	New York City, NY, United States	12 June 2010
European Leading	Teddy Tamgho (FRA)	17.98	New York City, NY, United States	12 June 2010

== Schedule ==
Date	Time	Round
27 July 2010	20:20	Qualification
29 July 2010	19:40	Final

== Results ==
=== Qualification ===
Qualification: Qualification Performance 16.75 (Q) or at least 12 best performers advance to the final.

Rank	Group	Athlete	Nationality	#1	#2	#3	Result	Notes
1	B	Teddy Tamgho	France	x	17.37		17.37	Q
2	B	Viktor Kuznyetsov	Ukraine	x	17.22		17.22	Q
3	A	Benjamin Compaoré	France	x	17.19		17.19	Q
4	A	Phillips Idowu	Great Britain & N.I.	17.10			17.10	Q
5	A	Momchil Karailiev	Bulgaria	17.05			17.05	Q
6	B	Marian Oprea	Romania	17.03			17.03	Q
7	B	Dimítrios Tsiámis	Greece	16.73	16.98		16.98	Q, SB
8	A	Fabrizio Schembri	Italy	16.96			16.96	Q, SB
9	B	Vladimir Letnicov	Moldova	16.14	16.94		16.94	Q
10	A	Fabrizio Donato	Italy	x	16.88		16.88	Q
11	A	Lyukman Adams	Russia	15.85	16.56	16.86	16.86	Q
12	B	Nathan Douglas	Great Britain & N.I.	16.80			16.80	Q
13	B	Dmitrij Vaľukevič	Slovakia	16.78			16.78	Q
14	A	Yochai Halevi	Israel	16.34	16.76		16.76	Q, PB
15	B	Jaanus Uudmäe	Estonia	x	x	16.72	16.72	
16	B	Siarhei Ivanou	Belarus	16.66	14.81	16.18	16.66	
17	B	Daniele Greco	Italy	x	16.37	16.51	16.51	
18	A	Andrés Capellán	Spain	15.91	16.38	15.06	16.38	SB
19	A	Igor Sjunin	Estonia	16.25	16.35	14.50	16.35	
20	B	Yevgeniy Plotnir	Russia	15.44	16.12	16.34	16.34	
21	A	Mantas Dilys	Lithuania	16.32	x	16.08	16.32	SB
22	A	Zhivko Petkov	Bulgaria	x	x	16.20	16.20	
23	A	Dzmitry Platnitski	Belarus	x	13.92	15.95	15.95	
24	B	Zacharias Arnos	Cyprus	x	15.35	15.85	15.85	
25	B	Alexander Martínez	Switzerland	15.55	x	x	15.55	
26	A	Nikólaos Frággos	Greece	x	15.50	x	15.50	
27	B	Redjep Selman	Macedonia	x	x	15.39	15.39	SB
	A	Ilya Yefremov	Russia	x	x	x	NM	

=== Final ===
Rank	Athlete	Nationality	#1	#2	#3	#4	#5	#6	Result	Notes
1st place, gold medalist(s)	Phillips Idowu	Great Britain & N.I.	17.46	17.47	17.40	17.81	x	–	17.81	PB
2nd place, silver medalist(s)	Marian Oprea	Romania	16.15	17.19	16.61	16.75	17.51	x	17.51	SB
3rd place, bronze medalist(s)	Teddy Tamgho	France	17.12	17.42	x	x	17.45	17.34	17.45	
4	Viktor Kuznyetsov	Ukraine	16.97	16.82	17.29	16.52	x	16.46	17.29	PB
5	Benjamin Compaoré	France	16.74	16.38	14.26	16.99	x	x	16.99	
6	Lyukman Adams	Russia	16.78	x	15.89	16.78	x	16.40	16.78	
7	Dmitrij Vaľukevič	Slovakia	16.51	16.75	16.77	16.75	x	16.37	16.77	
8	Fabrizio Schembri	Italy	x	16.60	16.40	16.42	16.61	16.73	16.73	
9	Fabrizio Donato	Italy	16.35	16.33	16.54				16.54	
10	Nathan Douglas	Great Britain & N.I.	x	16.48	15.53				16.48	
11	Yochai Halevi	Israel	16.39	16.39	16.43				16.43	
12	Vladimir Letnicov	Moldova	15.48	x	16.37				16.37	
13	Dimítrios Tsiámis	Greece	15.96	16.13	16.31				16.31	
14	Momchil Karailiev	Bulgaria	x	15.24	x				15.24	
