= 2005 European Athletics Indoor Championships – Men's triple jump =

The Men's triple jump event at the 2005 European Athletics Indoor Championships was held on March 4–5.

== Medalists ==
Gold	Silver	Bronze
Igor Spasovkhodskiy; Russia	Mykola Savolainen; Ukraine	Aleksandr Petrenko; Russia

== Results ==
=== Qualification ===
Qualifying perf. 16.90 (Q) or 8 best performers (q) advanced to the Final.

Rank	Group	Athlete	Nationality	#1	#2	#3	Result	Note
1	A	Momchil Karailiev	Bulgaria	16.72	17.15		17.15	Q, PB
2	B	Aleksandr Petrenko	Russia	16.88	–	16.60	16.88	q
3	B	Mykola Savolainen	Ukraine	13.74	16.87	16.37	16.87	q, SB
4	A	Igor Spasovkhodskiy	Russia	16.79	16.79	–	16.79	q
5	A	Michael Velter	Belgium	X	X	16.66	16.66	q
6	B	Jacek Kazimierowski	Poland	15.50	16.54	16.63	16.63	q
7	A	Péter Tölgyesi	Hungary	16.58	16.24	X	16.58	q
8	B	Nathan Douglas	Great Britain	16.24	16.57	X	16.57	q
9	B	Aleksandr Sergeyev	Russia	X	X	16.57	16.57	
10	A	Larry Achike	Great Britain	X	X	16.49	16.49	PB
11	B	Phillips Idowu	Great Britain	16.44	16.26	16.42	16.44	
12	A	Anders Møller	Denmark	X	X	16.44	16.44	NR
13	A	Vladimir Letnicov	Moldova	15.93	16.04	X	16.04	
14	B	Boštjan Šimunič	Slovenia	15.42	15.86	X	15.86	
15	B	Salvatore Morello	Italy	15.62	15.82	15.77	15.82	
16	A	Konstadinos Zalaggitis	Greece	X	15.75	X	15.75	
17	A	Andrés Capellán	Spain	13.27	15.64	15.27	15.64	
18	A	Carlos Calado	Portugal	15.63	15.61	–	15.63	
19	B	Erik Nurijanyan	Armenia	14.86	X	15.49	15.49	PB
20	B	Eduardo Pérez	Spain	15.43	13.81	X	15.43	

=== Final ===
Rank	Athlete	Nationality	#1	#2	#3	#4	#5	#6	Result	Note
1st place, gold medalist(s)	Igor Spasovkhodskiy	Russia	X	X	X	16.64	17.20	16.93	17.20	PB
2nd place, silver medalist(s)	Mykola Savolainen	Ukraine	15.70	X	16.78	16.87	17.01	16.90	17.01	SB
3rd place, bronze medalist(s)	Aleksandr Petrenko	Russia	16.65	16.97	16.98	16.35	16.91	X	16.98	PB
4	Nathan Douglas	Great Britain	16.57	X	X	16.59	16.89	16.85	16.89	PB
5	Momchil Karailiev	Bulgaria	16.64	16.22	X	X	X	16.13	16.64	
6	Jacek Kazimierowski	Poland	X	16.11	16.14	X	16.26	X	16.26	
7	Péter Tölgyesi	Hungary	16.00	X	X	15.60	16.03	16.17	16.17	
8	Michael Velter	Belgium	X	15.91	14.30	X	X	X	15.91	
