= 2006 European Athletics Championships – Men's triple jump =

Men's triple jump at the European Athletics Championships

The Men's triple jump event at the 2006 European Athletics Championships was held at the Ullevi on August 10 and August 12.

== Medalists ==
Gold	Christian Olsson; Sweden (SWE)
Silver	(United Kingdom) Nathan Douglas; Great Britain (GBR)
Bronze	Marian Oprea; Romania (ROM)

== Abbreviations ==
- All results shown are in metres

Q	automatic qualification
q	qualification by rank
DNS	did not start
NM	no mark
WR	world record
AR	area record
NR	national record
PB	personal best
SB	season best

== Schedule ==
Date	Time	Round
August 10, 2006	19:20	Qualification
August 12, 2006	15:50	Final

== Records ==
Standing records prior to the 2006 European Athletics Championships
World Record	Jonathan Edwards (GBR)	18.29 m	August 7, 1995	Gothenburg, Sweden
Event Record	Jonathan Edwards (GBR)	17.99 m	August 23, 1998	Budapest, Hungary

== Results ==
=== Qualification ===
Qualification: Qualifying Performance 16.95 (Q) or at least 12 best performers (q) advance to the final.

Rank	Group	Athlete	Nationality	#1	#2	#3	Result	Notes
1	B	Christian Olsson	Sweden	17.51			17.51	Q
2	B	Nelson Évora	Portugal	17.23			17.23	Q, NR
3	B	Alexander Martínez	Switzerland	13.69	17.13		17.13	Q, NR
4	A	Marian Oprea	Romania	16.85	17.05		17.05	Q
5	A	Yevhen Semenenko	Ukraine	17.03			17.03	Q, PB
6	B	Aleksandr Sergeyev	Russia	17.02			17.02	Q
7	A	Phillips Idowu	Great Britain	16.44	17.01		17.01	Q
8	B	Nathan Douglas	Great Britain	16.79	16.84	16.77	16.84	q
9	A	Viktor Yastrebov	Ukraine	16.81	16.56	16.45	16.81	q
10	A	Aleksandr Petrenko	Russia	16.46	16.22	16.76	16.76	q
11	B	Mykola Savolaynen	Ukraine	16.43	16.64	16.75	16.75	q
12	A	Danil Burkenya	Russia	16.58	16.45	16.74	16.74	q
13	B	Julien Kapek	France	16.35	16.04	16.74	16.74	
14	B	Larry Achike	Great Britain	16.42	16.68	x	16.68	
15	A	Dmitrij Valukevic	Slovakia	16.67	x	16.64	16.67	
16	B	Fabrizio Donato	Italy	16.62	x	16.66	16.66	
17	A	Michael Velter	Belgium	x	16.17	16.56	16.56	
18	B	Anders Møller	Denmark	16.26	15.74	16.46	16.46	SB
19	A	Fabrizio Schembri	Italy	16.21	16.24	16.34	16.34	
20	B	Lauri Leis	Estonia	x	16.34	16.13	16.34	
21	A	Karl Taillepierre	France	x	16.34	x	16.34	
22	A	Andrej Batagelj	Slovenia	15.91	x	15.60	15.91	
23	B	Daniel Donovici	Romania	x	x	15.74	15.74	
	A	Konstadinos Zalagitis	Greece	x	x	x	NM	
	A	Hristos Meletoglou	Greece	x	x	x	NM	

=== Final ===
Rank	Athlete	Nationality	#1	#2	#3	#4	#5	#6	Result	Notes
1st place, gold medalist(s)	Christian Olsson	Sweden	17.20	17.67	x	x	x	x	17.67	EL
2nd place, silver medalist(s)	Nathan Douglas	Great Britain	15.36	16.72	17.12	17.21	x	x	17.21	
3rd place, bronze medalist(s)	Marian Oprea	Romania	16.59	16.86	x	17.02	17.18	x	17.18	
4	Nelson Évora	Portugal	17.07	x	x	x	x	16.70	17.07	
5	Phillips Idowu	Great Britain	x	17.01	17.02	x	16.40	x	17.02	
6	Danil Burkenya	Russia	16.01	16.98	16.59	16.57	16.91	16.98	16.98	
7	Viktor Yastrebov	Ukraine	16.93	16.85	16.94	16.94	16.93	16.84	16.94	
8	Mykola Savolaynen	Ukraine	16.41	16.49	16.83	x	16.84	x	16.84	
9	Alexander Martínez	Switzerland	15.71	16.80	16.65				16.80	
10	Aleksandr Sergeyev	Russia	16.65	x	x				16.65	
11	Aleksandr Petrenko	Russia	16.26	16.60	16.55				16.60	
12	Yevhen Semenenko	Ukraine	16.34	x	16.39				16.39	
