= 2002 World Junior Championships in Athletics – Men's triple jump =

The men's triple jump event at the 2002 World Junior Championships in Athletics was held in Kingston, Jamaica, at National Stadium on 19 and 20 July.

== Medalists ==
Gold	David Giralt; Cuba
Silver	Li Yanxi; China
Bronze	Aleksandr Sergeyev; Russia

== Results ==
=== Final ===
20 July

Rank	Name	Nationality	Attempts						Result	Notes
Rank	Name	Nationality	1	2	3	4	5	6	Result	Notes
1st place, gold medalist(s)	David Giralt	Cuba	16.48 (w: +1.0 m/s)	16.68 (w: +0.4 m/s)	15.85 (w: -0.3 m/s)	15.81 (w: -0.6 m/s)	16.67 (w: -0.4 m/s)	16.59 (w: -0.7 m/s)	16.68 (w: +0.4 m/s)	
2nd place, silver medalist(s)	Li Yanxi	China	x	16.02 (w: -0.1 m/s)	x	x	16.66 (w: -0.6 m/s)	13.81 (w: -0.1 m/s)	16.66 (w: -0.6 m/s)	
3rd place, bronze medalist(s)	Aleksandr Sergeyev	Russia	15.59 (w: +0.2 m/s)	x	x	16.36 (w: -0.3 m/s)	14.63 (w: -0.5 m/s)	16.55 (w: -0.4 m/s)	16.55 (w: -0.4 m/s)	
4	Aleksandr Petrenko	Russia	x	16.22 (w: -0.5 m/s)	15.87 (w: -0.3 m/s)	x	15.64 (w: -0.6 m/s)	16.20 (w: -0.5 m/s)	16.22 (w: -0.5 m/s)	
5	Davy Manga	France	15.88 (w: +1.1 m/s)	15.87 (w: -0.1 m/s)	15.99 (w: -0.8 m/s)	15.86 (w: -0.2 m/s)	14.74 (w: -0.6 m/s)	x	15.99 (w: -0.8 m/s)	
6	Nelson Évora	Portugal	15.65 (w: +1.0 m/s)	15.87 (w: -0.2 m/s)	15.26 (w: -1.0 m/s)	15.47 (w: -0.7 m/s)	15.63 (w: -0.7 m/s)	x	15.87 (w: -0.2 m/s)	
7	Osniel Tosca	Cuba	15.61 (w: +1.1 m/s)	15.50 (w: +1.3 m/s)	15.72 (w: +0.7 m/s)	15.37 (w: -0.3 m/s)	15.32 (w: -0.1 m/s)	15.38 (w: -1.4 m/s)	15.72 (w: +0.7 m/s)	
8	Leonardo dos Santos	Brazil	x	15.60 (w: +1.3 m/s)	x	15.34 (w: -0.7 m/s)	x	x	15.60 (w: +1.3 m/s)	
9	Ndiss Kaba Badji	Senegal	15.29 (w: +0.3 m/s)	15.20 (w: +0.4 m/s)	15.14 (w: +0.9 m/s)				15.29 (w: +0.3 m/s)	
10	Oleg Panyutin	Azerbaijan	x	15.18 (w: +0.3 m/s)	15.11 (w: +0.4 m/s)				15.18 (w: +0.3 m/s)	
11	Kenen Shadd	Canada	x	x	15.11 (w: -0.2 m/s)				15.11 (w: -0.2 m/s)	
	Rafeeq Curry	United States	x	x	x				NM	

=== Qualifications ===
19 Jul

==== Group A ====
Rank	Name	Nationality	Attempts			Result	Notes
Rank	Name	Nationality	1	2	3	Result	Notes
1	Aleksandr Sergeyev	Russia	15.95 (w: +0.8 m/s)	-	-	15.95 (w: +0.8 m/s)	Q
2	Ndiss Kaba Badji	Senegal	15.79 (w: +0.2 m/s)	-	-	15.79 (w: +0.2 m/s)	Q
3	Nelson Évora	Portugal	15.08 (w: +0.4 m/s)	15.70 (w: +0.5 m/s)	-	15.70 (w: +0.5 m/s)	Q
4	Kenen Shadd	Canada	x	x	15.67 (w: +0.1 m/s)	15.67 (w: +0.1 m/s)	Q
5	Osniel Tosca	Cuba	15.13 (w: +0.6 m/s)	15.60 (w: +0.3 m/s)	15.34 (w: -0.6 m/s)	15.60 (w: +0.3 m/s)	q
6	Leonardo dos Santos	Brazil	15.57 (w: +0.5 m/s)	15.56 (w: 0.0 m/s)	14.81 (w: +0.4 m/s)	15.57 (w: +0.5 m/s)	q
7	Stylianos Petrou	Cyprus	15.26 (w: +0.4 m/s)	15.25 (w: +0.2 m/s)	15.45 (w: -0.6 m/s)	15.45 (w: -0.6 m/s)	
8	Simeon Mars	South Africa	15.41 (w: +1.0 m/s)	14.42 (w: +0.7 m/s)	14.82 (w: +0.4 m/s)	15.41 (w: +1.0 m/s)	
9	Idir Fellah	Algeria	15.12 (w: +1.3 m/s)	15.16 (w: +1.1 m/s)	x	15.16 (w: +1.1 m/s)	
10	Chirill Lisnic	Moldova	15.11 (w: +0.6 m/s)	14.90 (w: 0.0 m/s)	15.03 (w: -0.4 m/s)	15.11 (w: +0.6 m/s)	
11	Tadjou Salou	Togo	14.48 (w: +0.7 m/s)	14.65 (w: +0.4 m/s)	14.76 (w: +1.7 m/s)	14.76 (w: +1.7 m/s)	
12	Petar Ivanov	Bulgaria	14.76 (w: +0.1 m/s)	x	x	14.76 (w: +0.1 m/s)	

==== Group B ====
Rank	Name	Nationality	Attempts			Result	Notes
Rank	Name	Nationality	1	2	3	Result	Notes
1	Davy Manga	France	15.59 (w: +0.4 m/s)	x	16.11 (w: +0.3 m/s)	16.11 (w: +0.3 m/s)	Q
2	Li Yanxi	China	16.05 (w: -0.1 m/s)	-	-	16.05 (w: -0.1 m/s)	Q
3	Rafeeq Curry	United States	x	15.91 (w: -0.4 m/s)	-	15.91 (w: -0.4 m/s)	Q
4	David Giralt	Cuba	15.75 (w: +1.5 m/s)	-	-	15.75 (w: +1.5 m/s)	Q
5	Aleksandr Petrenko	Russia	14.29 (w: -0.1 m/s)	15.62 (w: +0.8 m/s)	13.99 (w: -0.2 m/s)	15.62 (w: +0.8 m/s)	q
6	Oleg Panyutin	Azerbaijan	15.30 (w: +1.7 m/s)	15.56 (w: +1.2 m/s)	15.32 (w: -0.7 m/s)	15.56 (w: +1.2 m/s)	q
7	Miroslav Stankov	Bulgaria	15.30 (w: +0.3 m/s)	15.40 (w: +0.6 m/s)	15.38 (w: +0.4 m/s)	15.40 (w: +0.6 m/s)	
8	Ayata Joseph	Antigua and Barbuda	15.28 (w: +1.2 m/s)	14.47 (w: +0.4 m/s)	15.25 (w: +0.4 m/s)	15.28 (w: +1.2 m/s)	
9	Lars Kowalick	Germany	x	15.04 (w: -0.2 m/s)	15.26 (w: +0.1 m/s)	15.26 (w: +0.1 m/s)	
10	Damir Haracic	Bosnia and Herzegovina	15.09 (w: +0.3 m/s)	14.72 (w: 0.0 m/s)	x	15.09 (w: +0.3 m/s)	
11	Kenneth Sylvester	Jamaica	14.68 (w: +0.6 m/s)	x	14.81 (w: +0.9 m/s)	14.81 (w: +0.9 m/s)	

== Participation ==
According to an unofficial count, 23 athletes from 20 countries participated in the event.

- Algeria (1)
- Antigua and Barbuda (1)
- Azerbaijan (1)
- Bosnia and Herzegovina (1)
- Brazil (1)
- Bulgaria (2)
- Canada (1)
- China (1)
- Cuba (2)
- Cyprus (1)
- France (1)
- Germany (1)
- Jamaica (1)
- Moldova (1)
- Portugal (1)
- Russia (2)
- Senegal (1)
- South Africa (1)
- Togo (1)
- United States (1)
