= Athletics at the 2005 Summer Universiade – Men's triple jump =

The men's triple jump event at the 2005 Summer Universiade was held on 20 August in İzmir, Turkey.

== Results ==
Rank	Athlete	Nationality	#1	#2	#3	#4	#5	#6	Result	Notes
1st place, gold medalist(s)	Aleksandr Sergeyev	Russia	16.23	16.35	16.06	x	x	16.72	16.72	
2nd place, silver medalist(s)	Steven Shalders	Great Britain	15.70	15.23	16.43	16.34	16.67	15.47	16.67	
3rd place, bronze medalist(s)	Mykola Savolaynen	Ukraine	16.24	x	x	14.73	16.27	16.67	16.67	
4	Anders Møller	Denmark	15.62	16.12	15.65	16.24	x	16.64	16.64	
5	Aleksandr Petrenko	Russia	16.52	16.53	16.53	16.48	16.44	16.49	16.53	
6	Jefferson Sabino	Brazil	x	16.34	x	15.81	16.34	16.39	16.39	
7	Emanuele Sardano	Italy	16.16	15.80	15.12	x	x	x	16.16	
8	Vladimir Letnicov	Moldova	15.66	15.94	x	x	16.14	x	16.14	
9	Jaanus Suvi	Estonia	15.75	x	15.57				15.75	
10	Wu Liqiang	China	15.57	15.72	15.73				15.73	
11	Mantas Dilys	Lithuania	x	15.34	15.63				15.63	
12	Kittisak Sukon	Thailand	15.38	x	15.22				15.38	
13	Therayut Philakong	Thailand	15.09	15.17	x				15.17	
14	Roger Haitengi	Namibia	14.84	x	14.81				14.84	
15	Si Kuan Wong	Macau	x	14.77	x				14.77	NR
16	Arsen Sargsyan	Armenia	14.45	x	x				14.45	
	Roman Valiyev	Kazakhstan	x	x	x				NM	
	Ferhat Çiçek	Turkey	x	–	–				NM	
	Henry Linton	Costa Rica							DNS	
