= 2008 IAAF World Indoor Championships – Men's triple jump =

== Medalists ==
Gold
Phillips Idowu	United Kingdom
Silver
Arnie David Giralt	Cuba
Bronze
Nelson Évora	Portugal

== Qualification ==
Qualification rule: qualification standard 16.95m or at least best 8 qualified

Pos	Athlete	Country	Mark	Q	Attempts		
Pos	Athlete	Country	Mark	Q	1	2	3
1	Arnie David Giralt	Cuba	17.20 SB	Q	17.20		
2	Aarik Wilson	United States	17.17 SB	Q	16.74	17.13	
3	Dmitrij Valukevic	Slovakia	17.13 SB	Q	17.13		
4	Phillips Idowu	United Kingdom	17.05	Q	16.86	17.05	
5	Fabrizio Donato	Italy	16.96	Q	16.96		
6	Osniel Tosca	Cuba	16.93	q	16.82	16.93	16.93
7	Nelson Évora	Portugal	16.93	q	16.93	16.73	X
8	Danil Burkenya	Russia	16.83	q	16.83	15.20	16.40
9	Randy Lewis	Grenada	16.77		15.46	X	16.77
10	Andrés Capellán	Spain	16.67 PB		X	X	16.67
11	Kenta Bell	United States	16.66		16.17	16.37	16.66
12	Leevan Sands	Bahamas	16.31		15.76	16.31	16.24
13	Gu Junjie	China	16.25		16.21	16.08	16.25
14	Evgeniy Plotnir	Russia	16.21		16.21	X	16.20
15	Xhong Minwei	China	15.88 SB		15.74	15.88	X

== Final ==
Pos	Athlete	Country	Mark	Attempts					
Pos	Athlete	Country	Mark	1	2	3	4	5	6
Gold medal	Phillips Idowu	United Kingdom	17.75 WL	17.10	17.75	17.56	17.45	-	X
Silver medal	Arnie David Giralt	Cuba	17.47 PB	17.43	17.47	X	16.97	-	X
Bronze medal	Nelson Évora	Portugal	17.27	X	17.26	17.27	17.26	16.76	X
4	Fabrizio Donato	Italy	17.27 SB	X	17.10	X	17.27	X	X
5	Dmitrij Valukevic	Slovakia	17.14 SB	16.88	X	X	17.14	X	X
6	Osniel Tosca	Cuba	17.13 SB	17.06	17.13	X	16.84	17.04	16.62
7	Aarik Wilson	United States	16.88	X	16.88	X	X	16.41	16.87
8	Danil Burkenya	Russia	16.84	16.84	15.30	16.35	X	16.31	15.62
