= Li Yanxi =

Chinese triple jumper

Medal record

Men's athletics

Representing China

Asian Indoor Championships
Bronze medal – third place	2012 Hangzhou	Triple jump

Li Yanxi (Chinese: 李延熙; pinyin: Lǐ Yánxī; born June 26, 1984, in Shijiazhuang, Hebei) is a Chinese triple jumper.

He won the silver medal at the 2002 World Junior Championships, finished fourth at the 2006 IAAF World Cup and won the 2006 Asian Games.

His personal best jump is 17.59 metres, also the current Asian record, achieved in the 11th Chinese National Games in Jinan.

== Competition record ==
Year	Competition	Venue	Position	Notes
Representing China
2002	World Junior Championships	Kingston, Jamaica	2nd	16.66 m (wind: -0.6 m/s)
2002	Asian Junior Championships	Bangkok, Thailand	2nd	16.57 m
2003	Universiade	Daegu, South Korea	9th	16.25 m
2004	Olympic Games	Athens, Greece	15th (q)	16.74 m
2005	World Championships	Helsinki, Finland	–	NM
2006	World Indoor Championships	Moscow, Russia	20th (q)	16.13 m
2006	Asian Games	Doha, Qatar	1st	17.06 m
2007	World Championships	Osaka, Japan	16th (q)	16.57 m
2008	Olympic Games	Beijing, China	10th	16.77 m
2009	World Championships	Berlin, Germany	6th	17.23 m
2010	World Indoor Championships	Doha, Qatar	9th (q)	16.54 m
2010	Asian Games	Guangzhou, China	1st	16.94 m
2011	Asian Championships	Kobe, Japan	2nd	16.70 m
2011	World Championships	Daegu, South Korea	20th (q)	16.28 m
2012	Asian Indoor Championships	Hangzhou, China	3rd	16.23 m
