= Athletics at the 2008 Summer Olympics – Men's triple jump =

Men's triple jump at the Games of the XXIX Olympiad
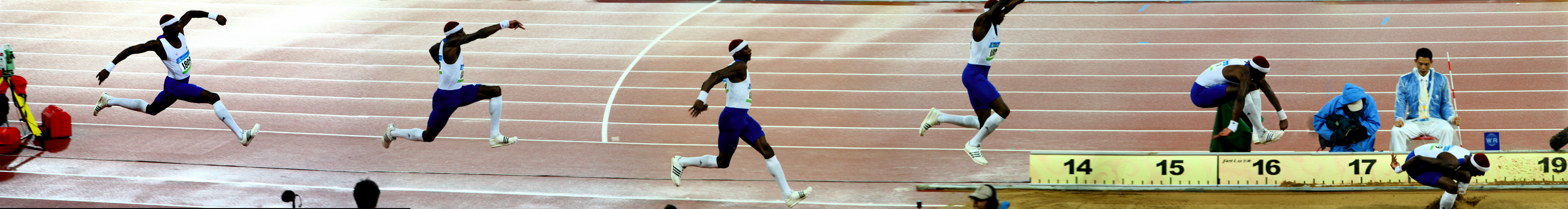
- Panorama of Phillips Idowu jumping
- Venue: Beijing Olympic Stadium
- Dates: 18 August 2008 (qualifying); 21 August 2008 (final)
- Competitors: 39 from 27 nations
- Winning distance: 17.67

Medalists
1st place, gold medalist(s)		Nelson Évora; Portugal
2nd place, silver medalist(s)		Phillips Idowu; Great Britain
3rd place, bronze medalist(s)		Leevan Sands; Bahamas

The men's triple jump at the 2008 Olympic Games took place on 18–21 August at the Beijing Olympic Stadium. Thirty-nine athletes from 26 nations competed. The event was won by Nelson Évora of Portugal, the nation's first medal and victory in the men's triple jump. Leevan Sands's bronze medal was the Bahamas' second bronze in the event, with the previous one in 1992.

== Background ==
This was the 26th appearance of the event, which is one of 12 athletics events to have been held at every Summer Olympics. The returning finalists from the 2004 Games were silver medalist Marian Oprea of Romania, bronze medalist Danil Burkenya of Russia, fifth-place finisher Jadel Gregório of Brazil, ninth-place finisher Kenta Bell of the United States, and Phillips Idowu of Great Britain, who had not made a legal mark in the final but whose qualifying round score (if it could have been carried over) would have placed him fifth. Nelson Évora of Portugal, who had finished 40th in 2004, had become the best triple jumper in the world over the intervening four years, winning the 2007 world championship and coming into the Beijing Games as the favorite.

Macedonia, Morocco, and Slovakia each made their first appearance in the event. The United States competed for the 25th time, having missed only the boycotted 1980 Games.

== Qualification ==
The qualifying standards were 17.10 m (26.9 ft) (A standard) and 16.80 m (26.41 ft) (B standard). Each National Olympic Committee (NOC) was able to enter up to three entrants providing they had met the A qualifying standard in the qualifying period (1 January 2007 to 23 July 2008). NOCs were also permitted to enter one athlete providing he had met the B standard in the same qualifying period. The maximum number of athletes per nation had been set at 3 since the 1930 Olympic Congress.

== Competition format ==
The competition used the two-round format introduced in 1936. In the qualifying round, each jumper received three attempts to reach the qualifying distance of 17.10 metres; if fewer than 12 men did so, the top 12 (including all those tied) would advance. In the final round, each athlete had three jumps; the top eight received an additional three jumps, with the best of the six to count.

== Records ==
Prior to this competition, the existing world record, Olympic record, and world leading jump were as follows:

World record	Jonathan Edwards (GBR)	18.29	Gothenburg, Sweden	7 August 1995
Olympic record	Kenny Harrison (USA)	18.09	Atlanta, United States	27 August 1996
World Leading	Phillips Idowu (GBR)	17.75 (i)	Valencia, Spain	9 March 2008

No new world or Olympic records were set during the competition. The following national records were set during the competition:

Nation	Athlete	Round	Distance
Bahamas	Leevan Sands	Final	17.59

== Schedule ==
All times are China Standard Time (UTC+8)

Date	Time	Round
Monday, 18 August 2008	10:00	Qualifying
Thursday, 21 August 2008	20:25	Final

== Results ==
=== Qualifying ===
Qualifying Performance 17.10 (Q) or at least 12 best performers (q) advance to the Final.

Rank	Group	Athlete	Nation	1	2	3	Distance	Notes
1	A	Phillips Idowu	Great Britain	17.44 (+1.0)	—	—	17.44	Q
2	A	Nelson Évora	Portugal	X	17.34 (+1.1)	—	17.34	Q, SB
3	B	Li Yanxi	China	16.93 (+0.6)	16.83 (-0.5)	17.30 (+0.6)	17.30	Q, PB
4	A	Arnie David Giralt	Cuba	17.30 (+0.9)	—	—	17.30	Q
5	B	Leevan Sands	Bahamas	17.25 (+0.5)	—	—	17.25	Q
6	A	Igor Spasovkhodskiy	Russia	16.79 (+1.8)	16.85 (+1.2)	17.23 (+0.4)	17.23	Q
7	B	Onochie Achike	Great Britain	X	17.18 (+1.1)	—	17.18	Q
8	A	Marian Oprea	Romania	X	16.99 (-0.1)	17.17 (-0.7)	17.17	Q
9	A	Jadel Gregório	Brazil	17.15 (+0.4)	—	—	17.15	Q
10	B	Héctor Dairo Fuentes	Cuba	16.73 (+0.3)	16.42 (+0.8)	17.14 (+1.1)	17.14	Q
11	B	Momchil Karailiev	Bulgaria	17.06 (+0.4)	17.12 (+0.6)	—	17.12	Q
12	A	Viktor Kuznyetsov	Ukraine	16.70 (+0.8)	17.11 (+0.1)	—	17.11	Q
13	A	Alexis Copello	Cuba	17.09 (+0.6)	16.92 (+0.1)	X	17.09	
14	A	Dmitrij Valukevic	Slovakia	X	16.86 (+0.4)	17.08 (+0.5)	17.08	
15	B	Randy Lewis	Grenada	X	17.06 (+0.6)	X	17.06	
16	B	Mykola Savolaynen	Ukraine	17.00 (+0.9)	16.55 (+0.5)	16.29 (+0.5)	17.00	SB
17	B	Aleksandr Petrenko	Russia	16.84 (+0.6)	16.97 (+1.1)	16.74 (+0.9)	16.97	
18	A	Kim Deok-Hyeon	South Korea	16.68 (+0.4)	14.68 (+1.0)	16.88 (+0.4)	16.88	
19	A	Rafeeq Curry	United States	X	16.23 (+1.7)	16.88 (+0.4)	16.88	
20	B	Nathan Douglas	Great Britain	16.45 (+0.8)	16.68 (+1.2)	16.72 (+0.1)	16.72	
21	A	Fabrizio Donato	Italy	16.10 (+0.4)	x	16.70 (+0.1)	16.70	
22	B	Danil Burkenya	Russia	16.44 (+0.5)	16.69 (+1.0)	15.65 (+0.5)	16.69	
23	B	Dimitrios Tsiamis	Greece	16.37 (+0.6)	16.65 (+1.0)	16.48 (+0.5)	16.65	
24	B	Vladimir Letnicov	Moldova	16.62 (+0.5)	X	X	16.62	
25	A	Kenta Bell	United States	16.55 (+0.9)	X	16.17 (0.0)	16.55	
26	B	Viktor Yastrebov	Ukraine	X	X	16.52 (+0.4)	16.52	
27	A	Dzmitry Platnitski	Belarus	16.51 (+0.1)	X	X	16.51	
28	A	Jefferson Sabino	Brazil	16.12 (+0.6)	16.45 (+1.0)	X	16.45	
29	B	Colomba Fofana	France	16.42 (+1.2)	15.47 (+0.6)	X	16.42	
30	A	Roman Valiyev	Kazakhstan	X	16.20 (+0.6)	15.93 (+0.3)	16.20	
31	A	Ibrahim Mohamdein Aboubaker	Qatar	16.03 (+0.4)	16.02 (+1.4)	15.90 (+0.1)	16.03	
32	B	Hugo Mamba-Schlick	Cameroon	16.01 (+0.3)	14.98 (+0.6)	X	16.01	
33	B	Aarik Wilson	United States	X	15.51 (+0.8)	15.97 (+0.9)	15.97	
34	B	Gu Junjie	China	15.94 (+1.0)	15.87 (+0.8)	X	15.94	
35	B	Renjith Maheshwary	India	15.77 (+0.5)	X	15.51 (0.5)	15.77	
36	A	Zhong Minwei	China	15.59 (+0.4)	X	14.91 (0.8)	15.59	
37	A	Redzep Selman	Macedonia	14.98 (+0.5)	15.29 (+1.6)	15.28 (+0.2)	15.29	
—	B	Ndiss Kaba Badji	Senegal	X	X	—	No mark	
—	B	Tarik Bouguetaïb	Morocco	X	X	X	No mark	

=== Final ===
Rank	Athlete	Nation	1	2	3	4	5	6	Distance	Notes
1st place, gold medalist(s)	Nelson Évora	Portugal	17.31	17.56	X	17.67	17.24	16.52	17.67	SB
2nd place, silver medalist(s)	Phillips Idowu	Great Britain	17.51	17.31	17.62	X	17.26	16.41	17.62	SB
3rd place, bronze medalist(s)	Leevan Sands	Bahamas	16.91	16.55	17.59	17.26	17.32	X	17.59	NR
4	Arnie David Giralt	Cuba	17.27	17.52	17.24	17.48	X	17.08	17.52	PB
5	Marian Oprea	Romania	17.22	X	X	X	X	16.69	17.22	
6	Jadel Gregório	Brazil	17.14	16.55	13.79	16.83	16.78	17.20	17.20	
7	Onochie Achike	Great Britain	16.74	X	17.17	X	17.04	X	17.17	
8	Viktor Kuznyetsov	Ukraine	16.71	16.87	X	16.81	16.48	X	16.87	
9	Igor Spasovkhodskiy	Russia	16.79	16.37	15.63	Did not advance			16.79	
10	Yanxi Li	China	15.93	16.35	16.77	Did not advance			16.77	
11	Momchil Karailiev	Bulgaria	16.48	16.39	16.38	Did not advance			16.48	
12	Héctor Dairo Fuentes	Cuba	15.92	X	16.28	Did not advance			16.28	
