= Osniel Tosca =

Cuban triple jumper (born 1984)

Personal information
- Full name: Osniel Tosca Rodríguez
- Born: June 30, 1984 (age 41) Santa Clara, Villa Clara
- Height: 1.78 m (5 ft 10 in)
- Weight: 68 kg (150 lb)

Sport
- Country: Cuba
- Sport: triple jump

Achievements and titles
- World finals: 2007 World Championships: Triple jump; – 4th
- Personal best: 17.52 m
Medal record
Men's athletics
Representing Cuba
Pan American Games
Silver medal – second place	2007 Rio de Janeiro	Triple jump
CAC Junior Championships (U20)
Silver medal – second place	2002 Bridgetown	Triple jump
- Updated on 22 May 2013

Osniel Tosca (born 30 June 1984 in Santa Clara, Villa Clara) is a Cuban triple jumper.

== Career ==
His personal best jump is 17.52 metres, achieved in May 2007 in Caracas.

== Personal best ==
- Triple jump: 17.52 (wind: +1.0 m/s) – (Venezuela) Caracas, 11 May 2007

== Achievements ==
Year	Competition	Venue	Position	Event	Notes
Representing Cuba
2001	World Youth Championships	Debrecen, Hungary	3rd	Triple jump	15.67 m (wind: -0.1 m/s)
2002	Central American and Caribbean Junior Championships (U-20)	Bridgetown, Barbados	2nd	Triple jump	15.87 m (wind: +1.0 m/s)
2002	World Junior Championships	Kingston, Jamaica	7th	Triple jump	15.72 m (wind: +0.7 m/s)
2005	ALBA Games	La Habana, Cuba	1st	Triple jump	16.58 m (wind: +1.4 m/s)
2006	NACAC U-23 Championships	Santo Domingo, Dominican Republic	1st	Triple jump	17.01 m (wind: +0.5 m/s)
2007	ALBA Games	Caracas, Venezuela	1st	Triple jump	17.52 m (wind: +1.0 m/s)
2007	Pan American Games	Rio de Janeiro, Brazil	2nd	Triple jump	16.92 m (wind: +0.1 m/s)
2007	World Championships	Osaka, Japan	4th	Triple jump	17.32 m (wind: +1.1 m/s)
2008	World Indoor Championships	Valencia, Spain	6th	Triple jump	17.13 m
2011	Central American and Caribbean Championships	Mayagüez, Puerto Rico	2nd	Triple jump	16.53 m (wind: -0.7 m/s)
