= Mykola Savolaynen =

Ukrainian triple jumper

Mykola Savolaynen (Ukrainian: Микола Саволайнен, born 25 March 1980) is a Ukrainian triple jumper.

His personal best jump is 17.08 metres, achieved in August 2002 in Donetsk.

== Competition record ==
| Year | Competition | Venue | Position | Notes |
Representing Ukraine
| 2001 | European U23 Championships | Amsterdam, Netherlands | 13th (q) | 15.83 m |
| 2002 | European Championships | Munich, Germany | 10th | 16.55 m |
| 2003 | Universiade | Daegu, South Korea | 6th | 16.60 m |
| 2004 | World Indoor Championships | Budapest, Hungary | 6th | 16.95 m |
| 2004 | Olympic Games | Athens, Greece | 20th (q) | 16.56 m |
| 2005 | European Indoor Championships | Madrid, Spain | 2nd | 17.01 m |
| 2005 | World Championships | Helsinki, Finland | 20th (q) | 16.35 m |
| 2005 | Universiade | İzmir, Turkey | 3rd | 16.67 m |
| 2006 | European Championships | Gothenburg, Sweden | 8th | 16.84 |
| 2007 | European Indoor Championships | Birmingham, United Kingdom | 4th | 16.98 m |
| 2007 | World Championships | Osaka, Japan | 15th (q) | 16.58 m |
| 2008 | Olympic Games | Beijing, China | 16th (q) | 17.00 m |
| 2009 | World Championships | Berlin, Germany | 19th (q) | 16.72 m |
