= 2005 European Athletics U23 Championships – Men's triple jump =

The men's triple jump event at the 2005 European Athletics U23 Championships was held in Erfurt, Germany, at Steigerwaldstadion on 15 and 17 July.

== Medalists ==
Gold	Aleksandr Sergeyev; Russia
Silver	Aleksandr Petrenko; Russia
Bronze	Nelson Évora; Portugal

== Results ==
=== Final ===
17 July

Rank	Name	Nationality	Attempts						Result	Notes
Rank	Name	Nationality	1	2	3	4	5	6	Result	Notes
1st place, gold medalist(s)	Aleksandr Sergeyev	Russia	17.02 w (w: 2.1 m/s)	x	x	17.11 (w: 0.0 m/s)	x	x	17.11 (w: 0.0 m/s)	
2nd place, silver medalist(s)	Aleksandr Petrenko	Russia	x	16.99 (w: 1.5 m/s)	16.82 (w: 0.3 m/s)	16.76 (w: 1.0 m/s)	17.03 (w: 0.6 m/s)	x	17.03 (w: 0.6 m/s)	
3rd place, bronze medalist(s)	Nelson Évora	Portugal	16.73 (w: 0.3 m/s)	16.52 (w: 0.3 m/s)	16.71 (w: 0.9 m/s)	16.43 (w: -0.3 m/s)	16.89 (w: 1.9 m/s)	x	16.89 (w: 1.9 m/s)	
4	Pere Joseph	Spain	15.57 (w: 0.7 m/s)	15.89 (w: 1.0 m/s)	x	16.25 (w: 1.5 m/s)	x	x	16.25 (w: 1.5 m/s)	
5	Pavlos Galaktiadis	Greece	15.42 (w: 0.9 m/s)	16.02 (w: 0.2 m/s)	x	x	x	16.13 (w: 0.5 m/s)	16.13 (w: 0.5 m/s)	
6	Dzmitry Dziatsuk	Belarus	16.13 (w: 1.9 m/s)	x	–	x	x	x	16.13 (w: 1.9 m/s)	
7	Stéphane Grézé	France	15.96 (w: 1.1 m/s)	16.01 (w: 1.2 m/s)	15.84 (w: 0.0 m/s)	15.60 (w: 0.0 m/s)	16.05 (w: 0.0 m/s)	15.98 (w: 0.9 m/s)	16.05 (w: 0.0 m/s)	
8	Mateusz Parlicki	Poland	15.76 (w: 1.2 m/s)	16.02 (w: 0.9 m/s)	15.57 (w: 0.6 m/s)	15.98 (w: 0.6 m/s)	15.60 (w: 0.8 m/s)	16.01 (w: 0.7 m/s)	16.02 (w: 0.9 m/s)	
9	Andrés Capellán	Spain	x	15.19 (w: 0.9 m/s)	15.77 (w: 1.4 m/s)				15.77 (w: 1.4 m/s)	
10	Donatas Senkus	Lithuania	x	x	15.67 (w: 1.0 m/s)				15.67 (w: 1.0 m/s)	
11	Daniel Mayaud	France	x	15.59 (w: -0.2 m/s)	x				15.59 (w: -0.2 m/s)	
12	Mantas Dilys	Lithuania	x	15.32 w (w: 2.5 m/s)	15.42 (w: 1.1 m/s)				15.42 (w: 1.1 m/s)	

=== Qualifications ===
15 July
Qualifying 16.20 or 12 best to the Final

==== Group A ====
Rank	Name	Nationality	Result	Notes
1	Aleksandr Sergeyev	Russia	16.24 (w: -0.6 m/s)	Q
2	Dzmitry Dziatsuk	Belarus	16.16 (w: -0.2 m/s)	q
3	Mateusz Parlicki	Poland	16.04 (w: -0.2 m/s)	q
4	Pavlos Galaktiadis	Greece	16.02 (w: -0.7 m/s)	q
5	Daniel Mayaud	France	15.98 (w: 0.9 m/s)	q
6	Pere Joseph	Spain	15.87 (w: 0.3 m/s)	q
7	Andrius Gricevičius	Lithuania	15.79 (w: 0.2 m/s)	
8	Petar Ivanov	Bulgaria	15.64 (w: -0.1 m/s)	

==== Group B ====
Rank	Name	Nationality	Result	Notes
1	Aleksandr Petrenko	Russia	16.56 (w: 0.8 m/s)	Q
2	Nelson Évora	Portugal	16.39 (w: 0.2 m/s)	Q
3	Mantas Dilys	Lithuania	16.19 (w: 1.0 m/s)	q
4	Andrés Capellán	Spain	16.08 (w: 1.4 m/s)	q
5	Stéphane Grézé	France	16.08 (w: 0.9 m/s)	q
6	Donatas Senkus	Lithuania	15.96 (w: 0.6 m/s)	q
7	Daniel Kohle	Germany	15.48 (w: 0.4 m/s)	
8	Michał Futyma	Poland	15.27 (w: 0.7 m/s)	

== Participation ==
According to an unofficial count, 16 athletes from 10 countries participated in the event.

- Belarus (1)
- Bulgaria (1)
- France (2)
- Germany (1)
- Greece (1)
- Lithuania (3)
- Poland (2)
- Portugal (1)
- Russia (2)
- Spain (2)
