= Aleksandr Petrenko =

Russian triple jumper (born 1983)

Aleksandr Petrenko (Russian: Александр Петренко; born 8 February 1983) is a Russian triple jumper. His personal best jump is 17.43 metres, Kazan 2008.

== International competitions ==
Year	Competition	Venue	Position	Event	Notes
Representing Russia
2002	World Junior Championships	Kingston, Jamaica	4th	Triple jump	16.22 m (wind: -0.5 m/s)
2005	European Indoor Championships	Madrid, Spain	3rd	Triple jump	16.98 m
2005	European U23 Championships	Erfurt, Germany	2nd	Triple jump	17.03 m (wind: +0.6 m/s)
2005	Universiade	İzmir, Turkey	5th	Triple jump	16.53 m
2006	European Championships	Gothenburg, Sweden	11th	Triple jump	16.60 m
2007	European Indoor Championships	Birmingham, United Kingdom	6th	Triple jump	16.96 m
2007	World Championships	Osaka, Japan	10th	Triple jump	16.66 m
2008	Olympic Games	Beijing, China	17th (q)	Triple jump	16.97 m
