= Rafeeq Curry =

American triple jumper

Personal information
- Born: August 19, 1983 (age 42) Miami, Florida, U.S.
- Home town: Tallahassee, Florida, U.S.
- Height: 6 ft 1 in (1.85 m)
- Weight: 161 lb (73 kg)

Sport
- Country: United States
- Sport: Athletics
- Event: Triple jump
- Club: The Shore Athletic Club
- Team: Florida Seminoles

Achievements and titles
- Personal bests: Outdoor: 17.22 m (2008); Indoor: 16.88 (2008)

Rafeeq Curry (born August 19, 1983, in Miami, Florida) is an American triple jumper. He is a 2002 U.S. junior champion, a 2006 NCAA outdoor triple jump champion, a nine-time All-American, two-time East Regional champion, six-time Atlantic Coast Conference titleholder, 2011 USA indoor Champion. Curry currently holds FSU's indoor and outdoor records for the triple jump. He also posted a personal best of 17.22 metres by winning the men's triple jump at the NCAA East Regional Meet in Tallahassee, Florida. Curry is a member of the track and field team for the Florida Seminoles, and a graduate of Florida State University.

Curry earned a spot on the U.S. team for the 2008 Summer Olympics in Beijing, by placing third, and edging out two-time Olympian and world champion Walter Davis at the U.S. Olympic Trials in Eugene, Oregon, with a best jump of 17.21 metres (56–6 ft). He competed as a member of U.S. track and field team in the men's triple jump, along with his teammates Aarik Wilson and Kenta Bell. Curry performed the best jump at 16.88 metres from his third and last attempt, but fell short in his bid for the final, as he placed nineteenth overall in the qualifying rounds.
