= Aleksandr Sergeyev (triple jumper) =

Russian triple jumper

Aleksandr Vladimirovich Sergeev (Russian: Александр Владимирович Сергеев; born 29 July 1983 in Kimry, Tver Oblast) is a Russian triple jumper. His personal best jump is 17.11 metres, first achieved in July 2004 in Cheboksary. He has a better indoor result with 17.23 metres from February 2004 in Moscow.

== Achievements ==
Year	Competition	Venue	Position	Event	Notes
Representing Russia
2002	European Indoor Championships	Vienna, Austria	6th	Triple jump	16.56 m
2002	World Junior Championships	Kingston, Jamaica	3rd	Triple jump	16.55 m (wind: -0.4 m/s)
2003	European U23 Championships	Bydgoszcz, Poland	5th	Triple jump	16.36 m (wind: +0.5 m/s)
2004	World Indoor Championships	Budapest, Hungary	13th (q)	Triple jump	16.60 m
2005	European Indoor Championships	Madrid, Spain	9th (q)	Triple jump	16.57 m
2005	European U23 Championships	Erfurt, Germany	1st	Triple jump	17.11 m (wind: 0.0 m/s)
2005	Universiade	İzmir, Turkey	1st	Triple jump	16.72 m
2006	European Championships	Gothenburg, Sweden	10th	Triple jump	16.65 m
2007	European Indoor Championships	Birmingham, United Kingdom	3rd	Triple jump	17.15 m
