= Fabrizio Schembri =

Italian long and triple jumper

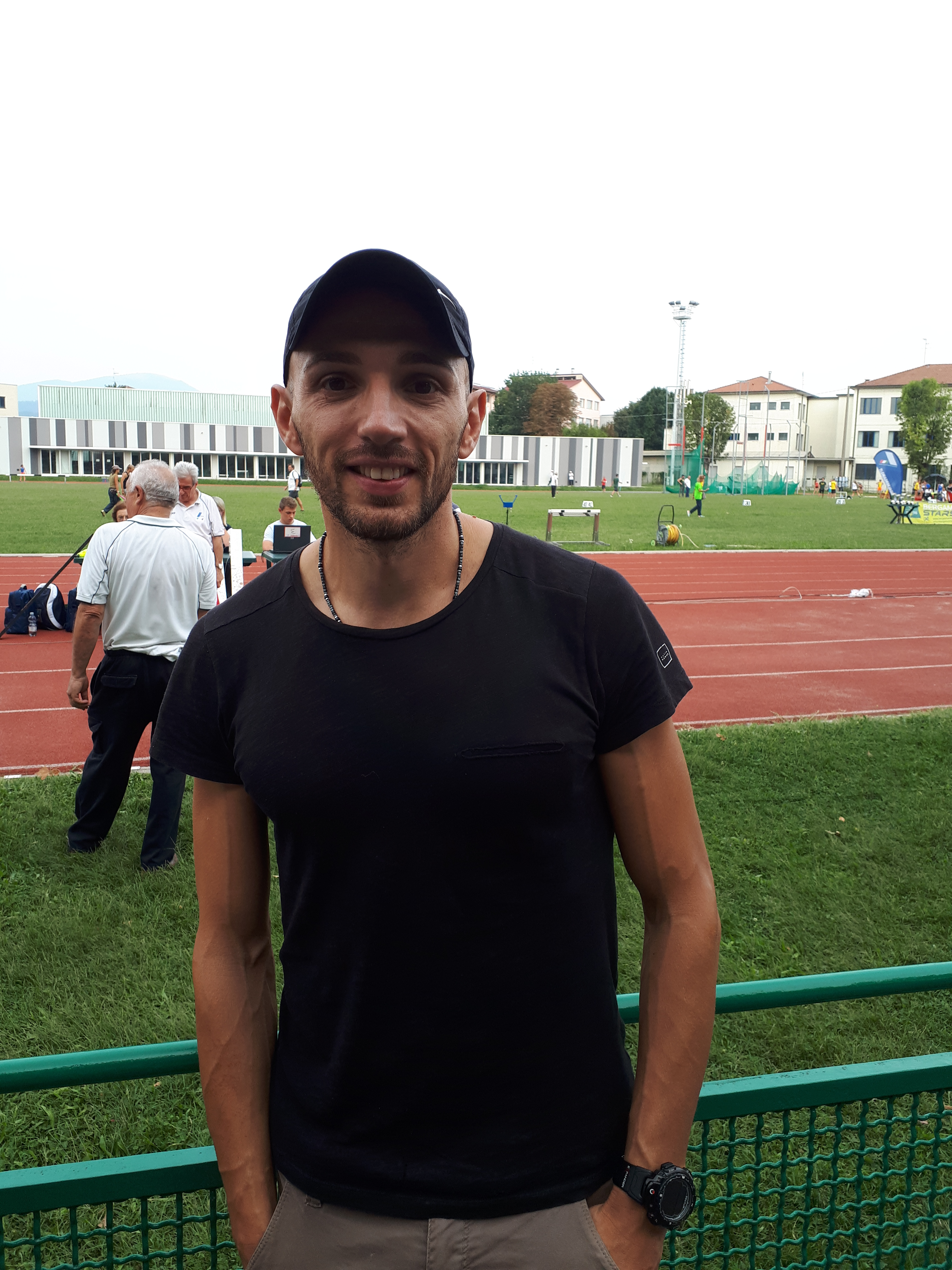

Personal information
- Nationality: Italian
- Born: 27 January 1981 (age 45) Saronno, Italy
- Height: 1.83 m (6 ft 0 in)
- Weight: 73 kg (161 lb)

Sport
- Country: Italy
- Sport: Athletics
- Event: Triple jumper
- Club: C.S. Carabinieri

Achievements and titles
- Personal best: Triple jump: 17.27 m (2009)
Medal record
Event	1st	2nd	3rd
European Team Championships	1	0	0
Mediterranean Games	1	0	1
Military World Games	0	0	2
Total	2	0	3

Fabrizio Schembri (born 27 January 1981) is an Italian athlete competing in the triple jump and occasionally in the long jump.

== Biography ==
Fabrizio Schembri won four medals, at senior level, at the International athletics competitions. He began his racing career in the ranks Athletics Rovellasca with the high jump, and soon became a promise in the specialty. But it is in the triple jump where he finds true fulfillment that leads to professionalism and the Gruppo Sportivo Carabinieri. Raised in Rovellasca, now resides in nearby Cascina Nuova.

== Achievements ==
Year	Competition	Venue	Position	Notes
Representing Italy
2003	European U23 Championships	Bydgoszcz, Poland	7th	16.24 m (wind: 1.1 m/s)
2003	Military World Games	(Italy) Catania	3rd	15.69 m
2006	European Championships	(Sweden) Gothenburg	19th (q)	16.34 m
2007	Universiade	(Thailand) Bangkok	7th	16.31 m
2007	Military World Games	(India) Hyderabad	3rd	16.23 m
2009	Mediterranean Games	(Italy) Pescara	1st	17.09 m
2009	World Championships	(Germany) Berlin	15th (q)	16.88 m
2010	European Championships	(Spain) Barcelona	8th	16.73 m
2011	European Indoor Championships	(France) Paris	10th (q)	16.59 m
2011	European Team Championships	(Sweden) Stockholm	1st	16.95 m
2011	World Championships	(South Korea) Daegu	14th (q)	16.71 m
2012	European Championships	(Finland) Helsinki	10th	16.40 m (w)
2013	Mediterranean Games	(Turkey) Mersin	3rd	16.62 m
2013	World Championships	(Russia) Moscow	7th	16.74 m

== National titles ==
He has won 9 times the individual national championship.

- Italian Athletics Championships
  - Long jump: 2012
  - Triple jump: 2009, 2013, 2014, 2018
- Italian Athletics Indoor Championships
  - Triple jump: 2011, 2014, 2015, 2016

== See also ==
- Italian all-time top lists - Triple jump
