= Nathan Douglas =

English triple jumper

Personal information
- Nationality: British (English)
- Born: 4 December 1982 (age 43) Oxford, England
- Education: Loughborough University
- Height: 183 cm (6 ft 0 in)
- Weight: 76 kg (168 lb)

Sport
- Sport: Athletics
- Event: Triple jump
- Club: Oxford City Athletic Club
- Coached by: Ted King

Achievements and titles
- Personal best: 17.64m
Medal record
Representing Great Britain Men's Athletics
European Championships
Silver medal – second place	2006 Gothenburg	Triple Jump
European Indoor Championships
Silver medal – second place	2007 Birmingham	Triple Jump

Nathan James Douglas (born 4 December 1982) is a retired two-time Olympian and British athlete who specialised in the triple jump. He is an eight-time British champion and two-time European silver medalist.

== Biography ==
Douglas won two consecutive British Outdoor Championships claiming gold in the 2004 AAA Championships and the 2005 AAA Championships. His personal best is 17.64 m (57 ft 10 1/4 in), set in 2005, the current British Championships record, ranks him third on the Great Britain all-time list. The following year he won a silver medal at the 2006 European Athletics Championships in Gothenburg with a jump of 17.21 metres.

In 2007 he won a silver medal at the European Indoor Athletics Championships in Birmingham with a jump of 17.47m, the second longest jump in the world at the time. He suffered a major injury in 2007 and, although he managed to compete at the 2008 Beijing Olympics, he struggled to find form as the injury had upset his technique. The injury's severity and complications ultimately affected his chances of competing at the 2012 Olympic Games.

Douglas continued to compete taking part in World Championships, European Championships and the Commonwealth Games. Nathan was made team captain in 2016.

He went on to win a record eight British Championships including the 2016 British Athletics Championships and Olympic trials, and the 2018 British Athletics Championships. He won his last 16 years after his first, winning the triple jump at the 2020 British Athletics Championships.

Douglas is the most medalled triple jumper in British Championship history, winning five AAA Championships and winning with 22 medals in total, spanning over an international career of 22 years.

After retiring from competition he became an executive high performance and resilience coach.

== International competitions ==
Year	Competition	Venue	Position	Event	Notes
Representing Great Britain and England
2003	European U23 Championships	Bydgoszcz, Poland	14th (q)	Triple jump	15.68 m (+0.9 m/s)
2004	Olympic Games	Athens, Greece	13th (q)	Triple jump	16.84 m
2005	European Indoor Championships	Madrid, Spain	4th	Triple jump	16.89 m
2005	European Cup	Florence, Italy	5th	Triple jump	16.54 m
2005	World Championships	Helsinki, Finland	15th (q)	Triple jump	16.53 m
2005	World Athletics Final	Monte Carlo, Monaco	6th	Triple jump	16.81 m
2006	World Indoor Championships	Moscow, Russia	7th	Triple jump	17.05 m
2006	European Cup	Málaga, Spain	4th	Triple jump	16.62 m
2006	European Championships	Göteborg, Sweden	2nd	Triple jump	17.21 m
2007	European Indoor Championships	Birmingham, United Kingdom	2nd	Triple jump	17.47 m
2008	Olympic Games	Beijing, China	20th (q)	Triple jump	16.72 m
2009	World Championships	Berlin, Germany	10th	Triple jump	16.79 m
2010	European Championships	Barcelona, Spain	10th	Triple jump	16.48 m
2010	Commonwealth Games	Delhi, India	4th	Triple jump	16.96 m
2013	European Team Championships	Gateshead, United Kingdom	3rd	Triple jump	16.45 m
2014	Commonwealth Games	Glasgow, United Kingdom	11th	Triple jump	14.56 m
2016	European Championships	Amsterdam, Netherlands	15th (q)	Triple jump	16.33 m
2018	Commonwealth Games	Gold Coast, Australia	5th	Triple jump	16.35 m
2018	World Cup	London, United Kingdom	6th	Triple jump	16.24 m
2018	European Championships	Berlin, Germany	6th	Triple jump	16.71 m
2019	European Indoor Championships	Glasgow, United Kingdom	7th	Triple jump	16.33 m
