= Zhong Minwei =

Chinese triple jumper

Zhong Minwei (born 9 April 1987) is a Chinese triple jumper. His personal best jump is 17.27 metres, achieved in June 2007 in Jinan.

He won the bronze medal at the 2006 World Junior Championships and finished eleventh at the 2007 World Championships. He also competed at the 2008 World Indoor Championships without reaching the final.

== Achievements ==
Year	Competition	Venue	Position	Event	Notes
Representing China
2006	World Junior Championships	Beijing, China	3rd	Triple jump	16.29 m (wind: -0.4 m/s)
