= Arnie David Giralt =

Cuban triple jumper (born 1984)

Arnie Giralt
Personal information
- Full name: Arnie David Giralt Rivero
- Born: August 26, 1984 (age 41) Santiago de Cuba
- Height: 1.82 m (6 ft 0 in)
- Weight: 72 kg (159 lb)

Sport
- Country: Cuba
- Sport: Athletics
- Event: Triple jump
Medal record
World Indoor Championships
Silver medal – second place	2008 Valencia	Triple jump
Bronze medal – third place	2012 Doha	Triple jump
CAC Junior Championships (U20)
Gold medal – first place	2002 Bridgetown	Triple jump
- Updated on 21 June 2013

Arnie David Giralt Rivero (born 26 August 1984 in Santiago de Cuba) is a Cuban triple jumper.

== Career ==
His personal best jump is 17.62 metres, achieved in April 2009 in La Habana. His father is long jumper David Giralt.

== Personal bests ==
Event	Best	Venue	Date
Outdoor
Long jump	7.70 m (wind: +1.3 m/s)	(Cuba) La Habana	14 February 2002
Triple jump	17.62 m (wind: -0.2 m/s)	(Cuba) La Habana	25 April 2009
Indoor
Triple jump	17.47 m	(Spain) Valencia	9 March 2008

== Competition record ==
Year	Competition	Venue	Position	Event	Notes
Representing Cuba
2001	World Youth Championships	Debrecen, Hungary	2nd	Triple jump	16.33 m (wind: -0.7 m/s)
2002	Central American and Caribbean Junior Championships (U-20)	Bridgetown, Barbados	1st	Triple jump	16.75m (wind: +1.8 m/s)
2002	World Junior Championships	Kingston, Jamaica	1st	Triple jump	16.68 m (wind: +0.4 m/s)
2003	Pan American Junior Championships	Bridgetown, Barbados	2nd	Long jump	7.63 m (wind: +0.0 m/s)
2003	Pan American Junior Championships	Bridgetown, Barbados	1st	Triple jump	16.93 m (wind: -0.5 m/s)
2003	World Championships	Paris, France	4th	Triple jump	17.23 m (wind: +0.1 m/s)
2004	Ibero-American Championships	Huelva, Spain	1st	Triple jump	17.12 m (wind: +0.7 m/s)
2004	Olympic Games	Athens, Greece	17th (q)	Triple jump	16.70 m (wind: -0.6 m/s)
2005	World Championships	Helsinki, Finland	8th	Triple jump	17.09 m (wind: +0.7 m/s)
2007	World Championships	Osaka, Japan	7th	Triple jump	16.91 m (wind: +0.7 m/s)
2008	World Indoor Championships	Valencia, Spain	2nd	Triple jump	17.47 m
2008	Olympic Games	Beijing, China	4th	Triple jump	17.52 m (wind: +0.2 m/s)
2009	ALBA Games	Havana, Cuba	3rd	Triple jump	17.62 m (wind: -0.2 m/s)
2009	Central American and Caribbean Championships	Havana, Cuba	1st	Triple jump	17.46 m (wind: +0.0 m/s)
2009	World Championships	Berlin, Germany	5th	Triple jump	17.26 m (wind: +0.0 m/s)
2010	World Indoor Championships	Doha, Qatar	3rd	Triple jump	17.36 m
2011	World Championships	Daegu, South Korea	13th (q)	Triple jump	16.74 m (wind: +0.2 m/s)
2012	World Indoor Championships	Istanbul, Turkey	9th (q)	Triple jump	16.71 m
2012	Olympic Games	London, United Kingdom	16th (q)	Triple jump	16.45 m (wind: +1.1 m/s)
