= Nelson Évora =

Portuguese triple jumper (born 1984)

GCIH Nelson Évora
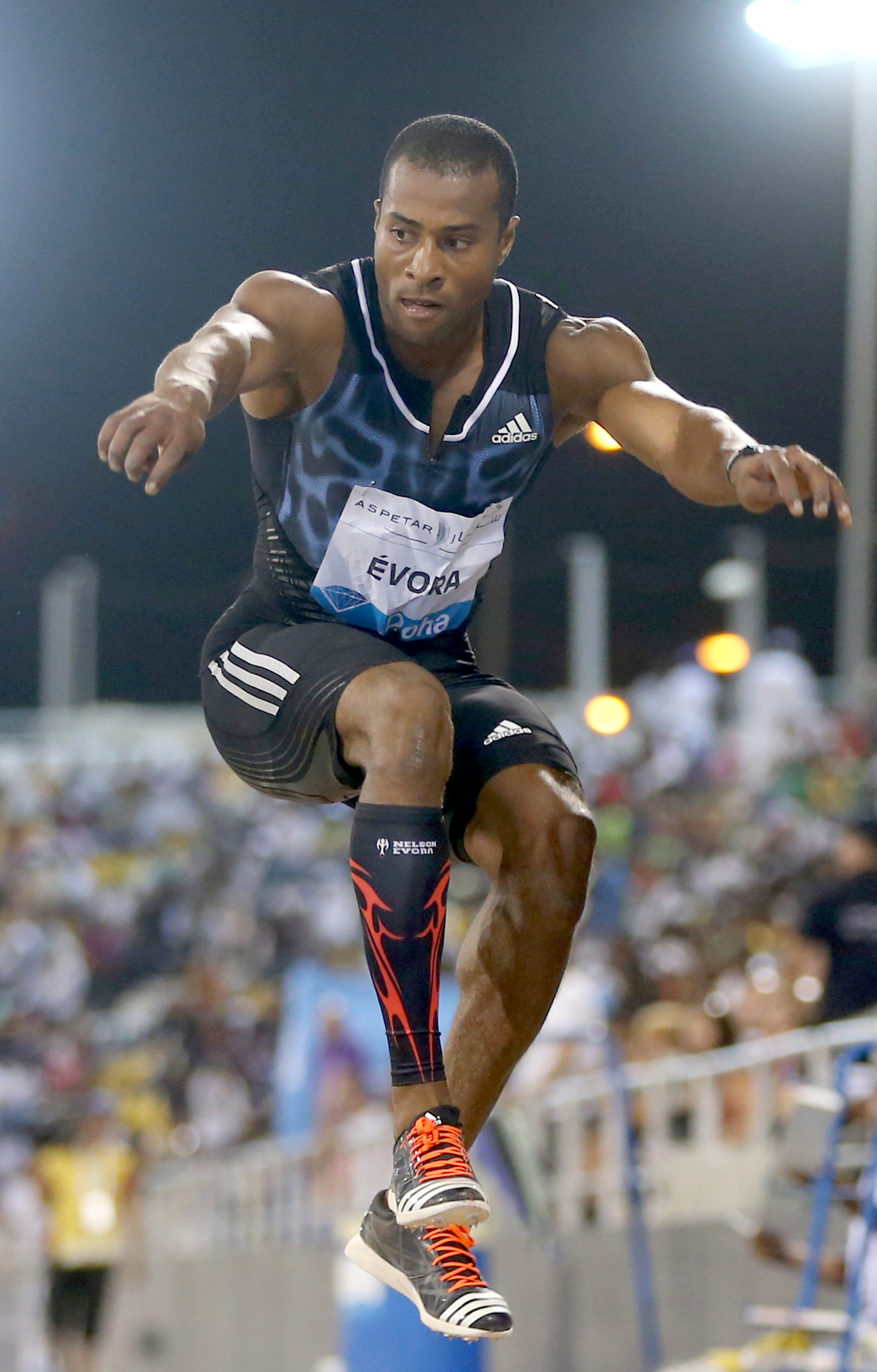
- Nélson Évora in 2015

Personal information
- Nationality: Portuguese
- Born: 20 April 1984 (age 42) Ouragahio, Ivory Coast
- Height: 1.83 m (6 ft 0 in)
- Weight: 76 kg (168 lb)

Sport
- Country: Portugal
- Sport: Track and field
- Event: Triple jump
- Club: FC Barcelona
- Coached by: Iván Pedroso
Medal record
Olympic Games
| Gold medal – first place | 2008 Beijing | Triple jump |
World Championships
| Gold medal – first place | 2007 Osaka | Triple jump |
| Silver medal – second place | 2009 Berlin | Triple jump |
| Bronze medal – third place | 2015 Beijing | Triple jump |
| Bronze medal – third place | 2017 London | Triple jump |
World Indoor Championships
| Bronze medal – third place | 2008 Valencia | Triple jump |
| Bronze medal – third place | 2018 Birmingham | Triple jump |
World Indoor Tour
| Winner | 2018 | Triple jump |
European Championships
| Gold medal – first place | 2018 Berlin | Triple jump |
European Indoor Championships
| Gold medal – first place | 2015 Prague | Triple jump |
| Gold medal – first place | 2017 Belgrade | Triple jump |
| Silver medal – second place | 2019 Glasgow | Triple jump |
Universiade
| Gold medal – first place | 2009 Belgrade | Triple jump |
| Gold medal – first place | 2011 Shenzhen | Triple jump |
Lusophony Games
| Gold medal – first place | 2006 Lusophony Games | 16.30 m |
| Gold medal – first place | 2009 Lusophony Games | 17.15 m |

Nelson Évora GCIH (born 20 April 1984) is an Ivory Coast-born Portuguese track and field athlete of Cape Verdean descent who specializes in the triple jump.

Évora is a former outdoor Olympic, World, and European triple jump champion. He has also won a European indoor title and the World indoor tour in triple jump. Évora competes at national level for Portugal and at club level for FC Barcelona. He represented Cape Verde until 2002, when he got Portuguese citizenship in June of that year.

== Biography ==
Born in Ouragahio, Ivory Coast, where his parents had come to live from Cape Verde, Évora and his family moved to Portugal when he was five years old. He still holds the Cape Verdean records in both the long jump (7.57 m) and the triple jump (16.15 m).

Évora's family settled in Odivelas, on the floor above João Ganço's—a former Portugal record-holder and the first Portuguese to pass over 2 meters in the high jump. Davide Ganço, one of João Ganço's three sons and one year older than Évora, became his best friend. One day, João Ganço, seeing them playing in the street, suggested that Évora started practising athletics, following Davide's example, and, just like that, Évora's athletic career started. João then became his coach.

Évora is a member of the Baháʼí Faith.

== Sports career ==
He competed in the triple jump in the 2004 Olympics, without progressing from his pool, and finished sixth at the 2006 IAAF World Indoor Championships. He finished fourth in the triple jump final and sixth in the long jump final at the 2006 European Athletics Championships in Gothenburg, having set a Portuguese triple jump record of 17.23 metres during the qualification. At the 2007 European Athletics Indoor Championships he came in fifth place.

On 27 August 2007, Évora became the triple jump world champion at the 2007 World Championships, in Osaka, Japan, establishing his personal best (Portuguese national record until May 2018) and second best world mark of the year at 17.74 metres.

On 9 March 2008, Évora placed third in the triple jump competition at the 2008 IAAF World Indoor Championships, in Valencia, by jumping 17.27 metres.

On 21 August 2008, he edged out Phillips Idowu of Great Britain and Leevan Sands of the Bahamas to take an Olympic gold medal with a 17.67 metres jump.

Évora set the world leading mark at the Grande Prêmio Brasil Caixa in May 2009, winning with 17.66 m. He was pleased with the jump (his third best performance ever) and stated his intention to surpass the 18 metre mark at the forthcoming 2009 World Championships. In mid-2009, he won the triple jump gold at the Universiade and another at the 2009 Lusophony Games.

However he was unable to replicate his winning form at the 2009 World Championships in Berlin, being relegated to second place. After leading with a first round jump of 17.55 m, the man he beat in the Olympics, Phillips Idowu, was able to take the gold with a third round jump of 17.73 m, the longest in the world for that year.

Évora represented FC Porto from 2002 to 2004, SL Benfica from 2004 to 2016 and Sporting Clube de Portugal from 2016 to 2020. Since 2020 he is an athlete of FC Barcelona.

== Personal bests ==
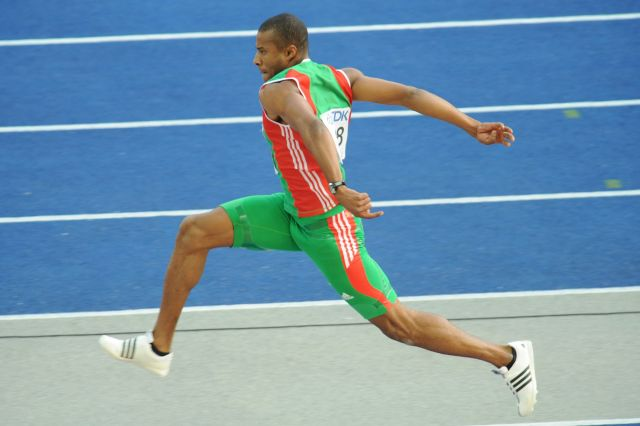
Évora en route to his 2009 World Championships silver medal

- High jump – 2.07 m (2005)
- Long jump – 8.10 m (2007)
- Triple jump – 17.74 m (2007)

== International competitions ==
| Year | Competition | Venue | Position | Event | Notes |
Representing Portugal
| 2001 | European Youth Olympic Festival | Murcia, Spain | 1st | Long jump | 7.49 m |
| 2002 | World Junior Championships | Kingston, Jamaica | 18th (q) | Long jump | 7.28 m (+0.7 m/s) |
| 2002 | World Junior Championships | Kingston, Jamaica | 6th | Triple jump | 15.87 m (-0.2 m/s) |
| 2003 | European Junior Championships | Tampere, Finland | 1st | Long jump | 7.83 m |
| 2003 | European Junior Championships | Tampere, Finland | 6th | Triple jump | 16.43 m |
| 2004 | World Indoor Championships | Budapest, Hungary | 10th (q) | Triple jump | 16.30 m |
| 2004 | Ibero-American Championships | Huelva, Spain | 7th | Triple jump | 15.56 m |
| 2004 | Olympic Games | Athens, Greece | 23rd (q) | Triple jump | 15.72 m |
| 2005 | European U23 Championships | Erfurt, Germany | 3rd | Triple jump | 16.89 m (+1.9 m/s) |
| 2005 | World Championships | Helsinki, Finland | 14th (q) | Triple jump | 16.60 m |
| 2006 | World Indoor Championships | Moscow, Russia | 6th | Triple jump | 17.14 m |
| 2006 | European Cup First League | Thessaloniki, Greece | 1st | Long jump | 8.05 m (0.0 m/s) |
| 2006 | European Cup First League | Thessaloniki, Greece | 2nd | Triple jump | 17.03 m w (+2.5 m/s) |
| 2006 | European Championships | Gothenburg, Sweden | 6th | Long jump | 7.91 m |
| 2006 | European Championships | Gothenburg, Sweden | 4th | Triple jump | 17.07 m |
| 2006 | Lusophony Games | Macau, China | 1st | Triple jump | 16.30 m |
| 2007 | European Indoor Championships | Birmingham, United Kingdom | 5th | Triple jump | 16.97 m |
| 2007 | European Cup First League | Milan, Italy | 1st | Long jump | 8.10 m (-0.9 m/s) |
| 2007 | European Cup First League | Milan, Italy | 1st | Triple jump | 17.35 m w (+2.4 m/s) |
| 2007 | World Championships | Osaka, Japan | 1st | Triple jump | 17.74 m NR |
| 2007 | World Athletics Final | Stuttgart, Germany | 3rd | Triple jump | 17.30 m |
| 2008 | World Indoor Championships | Valencia, Spain | 3rd | Triple jump | 17.27 m |
| 2008 | European Cup First League | Leiria, Portugal | 1st | Long jump | 7.88 m (0.0 m/s) |
| 2008 | European Cup First League | Leiria, Portugal | 1st | Triple jump | 16.91 m (+0.8 m/s) |
| 2008 | Olympic Games | Beijing, China | 1st | Triple jump | 17.67 m |
| 2008 | World Athletics Final | Stuttgart, Germany | 1st | Triple jump | 17.24 m |
| 2009 | European Team Championships | Leiria, Portugal | 2nd | Long jump | 7.94 m |
| 2009 | European Team Championships | Leiria, Portugal | 1st | Triple jump | 17.59 m |
| 2009 | Universiade | Belgrade, Serbia | 1st | Triple jump | 17.22 m |
| 2009 | Lusophony Games | Lisbon, Portugal | 1st | Triple jump | 17.15 m |
| 2009 | World Championships | Berlin, Germany | 2nd | Triple jump | 17.55 m |
| 2011 | European Team Championships | Stockholm, Sweden | 6th | Triple jump | 16.33 m |
| 2011 | Universiade | Shenzhen, China | 1st | Triple jump | 17.31 m |
| 2011 | World Championships | Daegu, South Korea | 5th | Triple jump | 17.35 m |
| 2014 | European Championships | Zurich, Switzerland | 6th | Triple jump | 16.78 m |
| 2015 | European Indoor Championships | Prague, Czech Republic | 1st | Triple jump | 17.21 m |
| 2015 | World Championships | Beijing, China | 3rd | Triple jump | 17.52 m |
| 2016 | World Indoor Championships | Portland, United States | 4th | Triple jump | 16.89 m |
| 2016 | European Championships | Amsterdam, Netherlands | 17th (q) | Triple jump | 16.27 m |
| 2016 | Olympic Games | Rio de Janeiro, Brazil | 6th | Triple jump | 17.03 m SB |
| 2017 | European Indoor Championships | Belgrade, Serbia | 1st | Triple jump | 17.20 m |
| 2017 | World Championships | London, United Kingdom | 3rd | Triple jump | 17.19 m |
| 2018 | World Indoor Championships | Birmingham, United Kingdom | 3rd | Triple jump | 17.40 m |
| 2018 | European Championships | Berlin, Germany | 1st | Triple jump | 17.10 m |
| 2019 | European Indoor Championships | Glasgow, United Kingdom | 2nd | Triple jump | 17.11 m |
| 2019 | World Championships | Doha, Qatar | 15th (q) | Triple jump | 16.80 m |
| 2021 | Olympic Games | Tokyo, Japan | 27th (q) | Triple jump | 15.39 m |

== Orders ==
- Grand Cross of the Order of Prince Henry (Portugal, 27 May 2015)
- Grand Cross of the Order of Merit (Portugal, 30 August 2018)

Awards
| Preceded by José Veras | Portuguese Sportsman of the Year; 2007–2009 | Succeeded by João Pedro Silva |
Olympic Games
| Preceded by Nuno Delgado | Flagbearer for Portugal; Beijing 2008 | Succeeded by Telma Monteiro |
