= Lawrence Willis =

American triple jumper

Personal information
- Born: July 12, 1981 (age 44) Lafayette, Louisiana, United States

Sport
- Sport: Track and field

Lawrence Willis (born July 12, 1981) is an American triple jumper.

Willis competed for the Louisiana Ragin' Cajuns track and field team in the NCAA.

He finished fifth at the 2007 Pan American Games. The same year he competed at the 2007 World Championships, without reaching the final.

His personal best jump is 16.97 metres, achieved in June 2007 in Indianapolis.
