= Alexander Martínez =

Cuban-Swiss triple jumper

Alexander Martínez (born 23 August 1977, in Isla de la Juventud) is a Swiss triple jumper. He changed nationality from his native Cuba in 2006.

His personal best jump is 17.51 metres, achieved in July 2005 in Bern. This result places him fifth on the all-time Cuban performers list, behind Yoelbi Quesada, Lázaro Betancourt, Aliecer Urrutia and Yoandri Betanzos. While competing for Switzerland he has set a new Swiss record of 17.13 metres.

== Achievements ==
Year	Competition	Venue	Position	Notes
Representing Cuba
2002	IAAF Grand Prix Final	Paris, France	3rd	
2003	World Athletics Final	Monte Carlo, Monaco	6th	
Representing Switzerland
2006	European Championships	Gothenburg, Sweden	9th	16.80
2006	World Athletics Final	Stuttgart, Germany	4th	
