= Redžep Selman =

Macedonian triple jumper

Personal information
- Nationality: North Macedonia
- Born: 8 April 1986 (age 40) Ohrid, SR Macedonia, SFR Yugoslavia
- Height: 1.83 m (6 ft 0 in)
- Weight: 77 kg (170 lb)

Sport
- Sport: Athletics
- Event: Triple jump

Redžep Selman (Macedonian: Реџеп Селман; born April 8, 1986, in Ohrid) is a Macedonian triple jumper. Selman represented Macedonia at the 2008 Summer Olympics in Beijing, where he competed in the men's triple jump. He finished only in thirty-seventh place for the qualifying rounds, with a best jump of 15.29 metres on his second attempt.
