= Walter Davis (triple jumper) =

American triple jumper (born 1979)

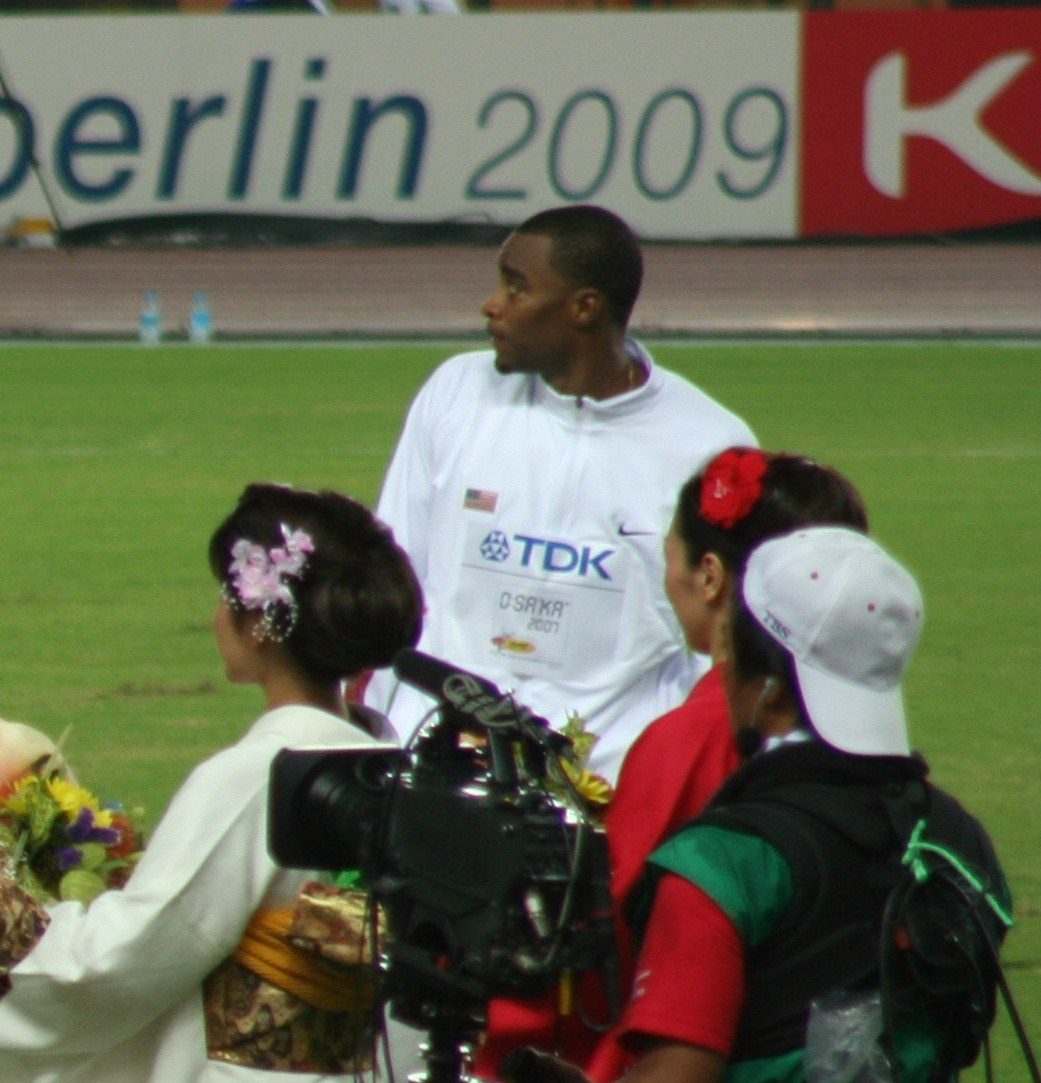
- Davis at the 2007 World Championships medal ceremony

Personal information
- Full name: Walter L. Davis
- Born: July 2, 1979 (age 46) Lafayette, Louisiana, U.S.
- Height: 6 ft 2 in (188 cm)
- Weight: 183 lb (83 kg)
Medal record
Men's athletics
Representing United States
World Championships
| Gold medal – first place | 2005 Helsinki | Triple jump |
| Bronze medal – third place | 2007 Osaka | Triple jump |
World Indoor Championships
| Gold medal – first place | 2006 Moscow | Triple jump |
| Silver medal – second place | 2003 Birmingham | Triple jump |

Walter L. Davis (born July 2, 1979) is an American athlete competing in the triple jump and occasionally in the long jump. He was born in Lafayette, Louisiana.

Davis won the 2005 World Outdoor and 2006 World Indoor Championships.

However, his greatest claim to fame may have occurred in the 2004 Olympic Trials, where in the later rounds of the final he put in an extraordinary jump, during the landing phase of which he lost control, with his foot hitting the sand a significant distance behind his rump, which is the usual area of the body which lands first in the sand. The jump had to be measured from first body contact with the sand, the foot, which was an official 17.63m. The distance of the jump to where his rump landed in the sand was at least 18 m from video analysis.

Davis was a member of the Louisiana State University track and field team.

In the period from July 2012 to 2013, he missed three mandatory drug tests. This resulted in a one-year ban from the sport.

== Achievements ==
- 2006 IAAF World Indoor Championships - gold medal
- 2005 World Championships in Athletics - gold medal
- 2004 Summer Olympics - 11th place
- 2003 IAAF World Indoor Championships - silver medal
- 2003 World Championships in Athletics - seventh place (long jump)
- 2001 World Championships in Athletics - fifth place
- 1st IAAF World Athletics Final - second place
