= Phillips Idowu =

British triple jumper

Phillips Idowu MBE
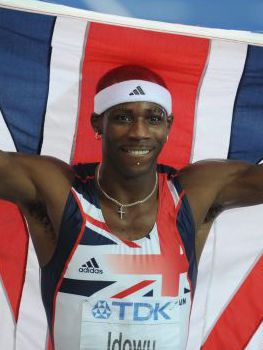
- Phillips Idowu at the 2009 World Championships.

Personal information
- Nationality: British (English)
- Born: 30 December 1978 (age 47) London, England
- Height: 1.97 m (6 ft 6 in)
- Weight: 87 kg (192 lb)

Sport
- Sport: Athletics
- Event: Triple jump
- Club: Belgrave Harriers
Medal record
Representing Great Britain
Olympic Games
Silver medal – second place	2008 Beijing	Triple jump
World Championships
Gold medal – first place	2009 Berlin	Triple jump
Silver medal – second place	2011 Daegu	Triple jump
Diamond League
Winner	2011	Triple jump
European Championships
Gold medal – first place	2010 Barcelona	Triple jump
World Indoor Championships
Gold medal – first place	2008 Valencia	Triple jump
European Indoor Championships
Gold medal – first place	2007 Birmingham	Triple jump
Continental Cup
Bronze medal – third place	2010 Split	Triple jump
Representing England
Commonwealth Games
Gold medal – first place	2006 Melbourne	Triple jump
Silver medal – second place	2002 Manchester	Triple jump
- Updated on 15 August 2012

Phillips Olaosebikan Idowu, MBE (born 30 December 1978) is a British athlete who specialised in the triple jump and was active at elite level between 2000 and 2014, with his greatest success coming between 2006 and 2011. He is a former World Outdoor (2009) and Indoor (2008), European Outdoor (2010) and Indoor (2007), Diamond League (2011) and Commonwealth Games (2006) triple jump champion. He was also a silver medalist at the 2008 Summer Olympics. Idowu is a member of the London-based Belgrave Harriers athletics club and has been for much of his career.

Despite his successes, Idowu had suffered by comparisons with his senior compatriot Jonathan Edwards, and had been at times accused of inconsistency and of failing to fulfil his potential, including his disappointing injury-affected failure at the London Olympics 2012. His championship record since 2007, especially his gold medal at the 2009 World Athletics Championships, addressed some of these criticisms; by the end of his elite career, the Olympic Games was the only major championship gold to have eluded him, with a silver medal his best return in 2008.

== Career ==
Idowu grew up in Hackney, and was a talented sportsman at school in both basketball and American football, yet he was most successful as a junior in athletics. In 1997 he came to attention as a triple jumper when he won the English Schools Championships and the under-20s AAA title, rounding off the year by coming fourth in the European Junior Championships.

Idowu's success continued in 2000, when he was ranked in the top 10 triple jumpers in the world and placed sixth in the 2000 Olympic Games. In 2001 he won the European Cup, though later that year his form was found wanting at the World Championships in Edmonton. His first major international medal came when he won silver at the 2002 Commonwealth Games, setting a new personal best of 17.68 metres but losing to world record holder and compatriot Jonathan Edwards. Later in 2002 he placed 5th in the European Championships.

In 2012, Idowu defeated world champion Christian Taylor at a Diamond League meeting in Shanghai.

=== Injury ===
A knee injury that required surgery ruled Idowu out of the whole 2003 season. His aim was to return to form in 2004 to compete at the Olympic Games in Athens.

=== Championship success ===
In March 2006, Idowu triumphed at the Commonwealth Games in Melbourne, winning gold. However, he failed to maintain this form and once again finished in 5th place at the European Championships later that year.

In 2007, in the absence of world leader Christian Olsson, Idowu beat compatriot Nathan Douglas to gold in the European Indoor Championships in Birmingham. He recorded a championship record jump of 17.56 m, beating Olsson's world-leading jump by 12 cm. Idowu went on to win the IAAF Golden League Bislett Games in June 2007 with a distance of 17.35 m. By July 2007 he was ranked the number three triple jumper in the world, a new career high.

On 9 March 2008, Idowu won his first world title, taking the gold medal at the 2008 IAAF World Indoor Championships in Valencia, Spain. His jump of 17.75 m also broke the British and Commonwealth Indoor record previously held by his compatriot and former adversary Jonathan Edwards, who presented him with his medal at the ceremony. Despite his successes at the Indoor Championships and Commonwealth Games, Idowu decided to change coach, switching from John Herbert to 1982 Commonwealth Games medalist Aston Moore. Reflecting on his choice, Idowu stated: "now is the right time to make a change as I develop and move forward".

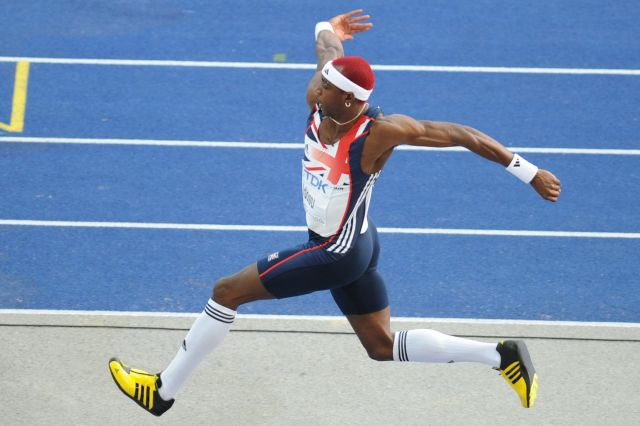
Idowu on the way to his first World Championships title in 2009 with a broken arm

Idowu won the men's triple jump title at the 2008 British Olympic Trials with a distance of 17.58 m, at the time the longest outdoor jump of 2008. He followed this up with further jumps of 17.57 m and 17.27 m.

Idowu took silver in the men's triple jump at the 2008 Beijing Olympics behind World Champion Nelson Évora after arriving at the games as the favourite. His best jump was 17.62 m, achieved in the third round. In an interview with Reuters, Idowu expressed disappointment at having won only silver, though he displayed good humour and also looked forward to the next Olympics in London.

Idowu missed the start of the 2009 athletics season due to a knee injury. On Tuesday 18 August 2009 he won the World Championships in Berlin with the longest jump of anyone so far this year and an outdoors personal best distance of 17.73 m, again having his medal presented by Jonathan Edwards. In July 2010 he broke his triple jump personal best jumping 17.81 metres at the Barcelona European Athletics Championships to win gold.

Idowu was appointed Member of the Order of the British Empire (MBE) in the 2011 Queen's Birthday Honours "for services to athletics".

=== 2012 Summer Olympics ===
Idowu was battling for fitness coming into the 2012 Summer Olympics in his native London, and had not jumped competitively for nearly three months. Idowu struggled and could not make it past the qualifying round of the triple jump, ending his hopes of a medal.

=== 2013–14 ===
After receiving leg surgery in autumn 2012, Idowu continued to struggle with fitness and form during 2013. In July 2013 he announced that he was "taking a step back" from the sport "for the foreseeable future", a step that some interpreted as tantamount to retirement. However, Idowu returned to top-level international competition at the Shanghai Diamond League meeting in May 2014, after a spell of training and competition in Australia.

Aged 36 in 2014, Idowu has not competed internationally since that season.

== Personal life ==
Idowu was educated at Brunel University London, where he studied sports sciences.

Idowu is known to the public for his eccentric personality, sporting a variety of hair colours, an array of facial piercings and trademark booming laugh. Other than triple jump, Idowu also enjoys basketball. He has a daughter, D'Karma (born 2007), and a son, Prince (born 2010). Both his parents are Nigerian.

In 2013, Idowu joined Jack Dee, Dara Ó Briain, Greg James, Melanie C and Chelsee Healey in Through Hell and High Water, a Comic Relief challenge which involved British celebrities canoeing the most difficult rapids of the Zambezi River. They raised over £1 million for the charity. He also appeared in the 2013 edition of Celebrity MasterChef, being eliminated in the second round.

In 2013 Idowu was banned from driving for two years and ordered to complete 50 hours community service after being caught drink driving by police.

== Personal bests ==
Event	Best	Location	Date
Triple jump	17.81 m	Barcelona, Spain	29 July 2010
Triple jump (indoor)	17.75 m	Valencia, Spain	9 March 2008
Long jump	7.83 m	Ljubljana, Slovenia	25 July 2000
60 metres	6.81 s	Carshalton, London, England	31 January 2004
100 metres	10.60 s	Ballarat, Australia	25 February 2006

=== International competitions ===
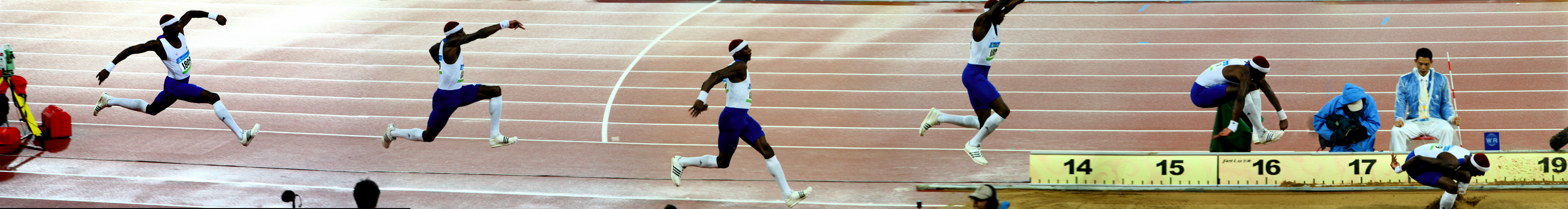
Panorama of Phillips Idowu in 2008 Olympic Games

Year	Competition	Venue	Position	Notes
Representing Great Britain and England
1999	European U23 Championships	Gothenburg, Sweden	5th	16.39 m (wind: +0.6 m/s)
2000	Olympic Games	Sydney, Australia	6th	17.08 m
2001	IAAF World Championships	Edmonton, Canada	9th	16.60 m
2002	Commonwealth Games	Manchester, UK	2nd	17.68 m
2002	European Championships	Munich, Germany	5th	16.92 m
2004	Olympic Games	Athens, Greece	12th	No Mark
2006	Commonwealth Games	Melbourne, Australia	1st	17.45 m
2006	European Championships	Gothenburg, Sweden	5th	17.02 m
2007	European Indoor Championships	Birmingham, UK	1st	17.56 m
2007	IAAF World Championships	Osaka, Japan	6th	17.09 m
2008	World Indoor Championships	Valencia, Spain	1st	17.75 m
2008	Olympic Games	Beijing, China	2nd	17.62 m
2009	IAAF World Championships	Berlin, Germany	1st	17.73 m
2010	European Championships	Barcelona, Spain	1st	17.81 m
2011	IAAF World Championships	Daegu, South Korea	2nd	17.77 m
