= Anders Møller =

Danish triple jumper

Personal information
- Born: 5 September 1977 (age 49) Aalborg, Denmark

Sport
- Sport: Track and field

Anders Møller (born 5 September 1977) is a Danish triple jumper. His personal best jump is 16.88 metres, achieved in August 2011 in Copenhagen. This jump beat his previous personal and national record of 16.76 metres, achieved in July 2005 in Århus. He has 17.01 metres on the indoor track, achieved in February 2006 in Malmö. Møller is also a two-time national champion in the men's high jump (1998 and 2001).

Møller finished fourth at the 2005 Summer Universiade and twelfth at the 2005 World Championships. He later competed at the 2006 World Indoor Championships, the 2006 European Championships and the 2007 World Championships without reaching the final. In 2011, Møller was 6th at the European Indoor Championships in Paris.

He is the current trainer of Swedish long jumper Erica Jarder.
