= Leevan Sands =

Bahamian triple jumper

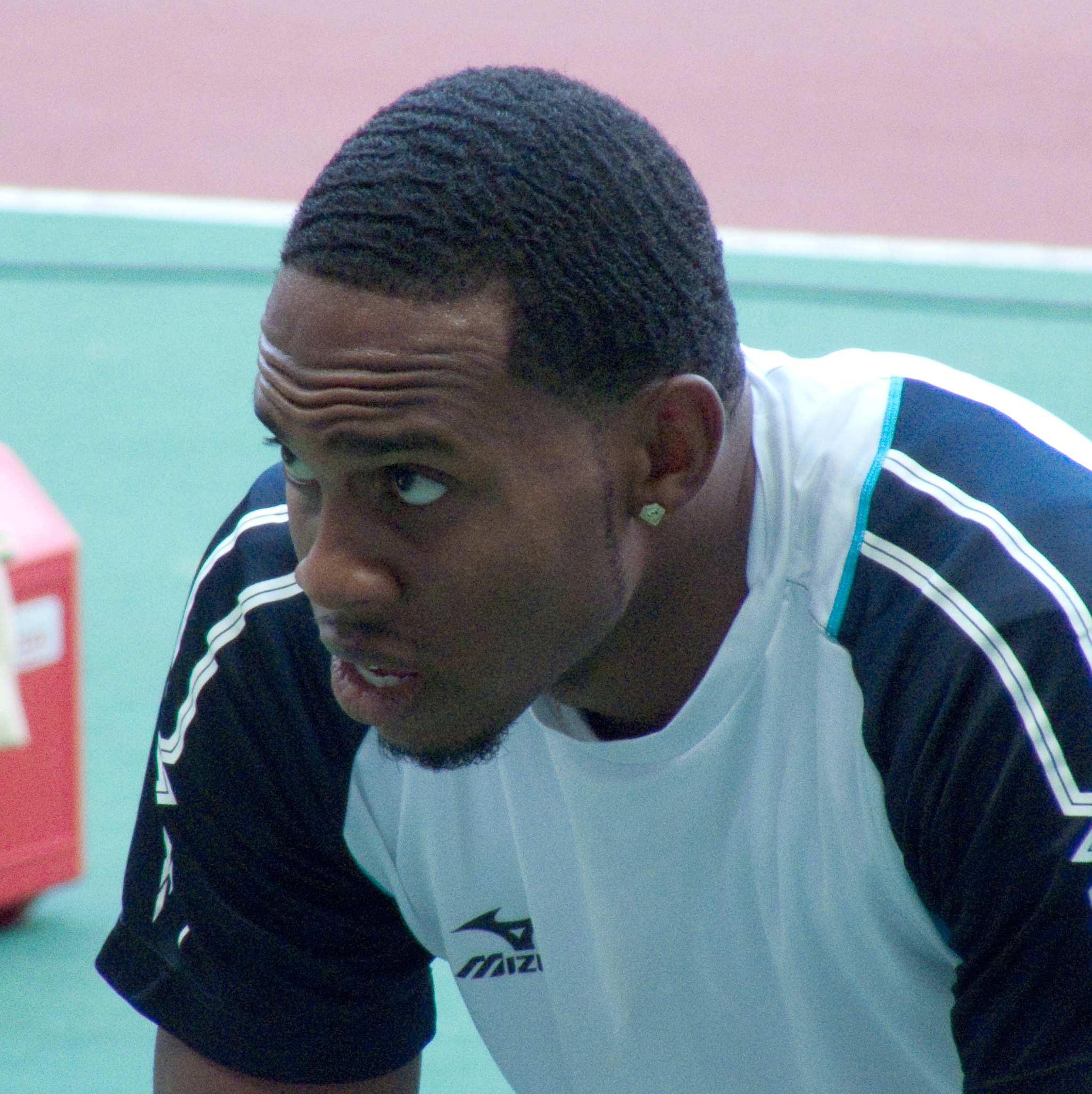

Personal information
- Born: August 16, 1981 (age 45)
- Height: 1.91 m (6 ft 3 in)
- Weight: 82 kg (181 lb)

Sport
- Country: Bahamas
- Sport: Athletics
- Event: Triple jump
Medal record
Representing Bahamas
Olympic Games
Bronze medal – third place	2008 Beijing	Triple Jump
World Championships
Bronze medal – third place	2003 Paris	Triple jump
Commonwealth Games
Bronze medal – third place	2002 Manchester	Triple jump
Pan American Games
Silver medal – second place	2015 Toronto	Triple jump
CAC Championships
Gold medal – first place	2003 St George's	Triple jump
Gold medal – first place	2005 Nassau	Long jump
Gold medal – first place	2008 Cali	Triple jump
Bronze medal – third place	2005 Nassau	Triple jump
NACAC Championships
Bronze medal – third place	2015 Costa Rica	Triple Jump
CAC Junior Championships (U20)
Gold medal – first place	1998 George Town	Triple jump
Gold medal – first place	2000 San Juan	Triple jump
Silver medal – second place	1998 George Town	Long jump
Silver medal – second place	2000 San Juan	Long jump
CARIFTA Games Junior (U20)
Gold medal – first place	1999 Fort-de-France	Long jump
Gold medal – first place	1999 Fort-de-France	Triple jump
Gold medal – first place	2000 St. George's	Long jump
Gold medal – first place	2000 St. George's	Triple jump
Bronze medal – third place	1998 Port of Spain	Long jump
Bronze medal – third place	1998 Port of Spain	Triple jump
CARIFTA Games Youth (U17)
Bronze medal – third place	1997 Bridgetown	Triple jump
- Updated on 15 August 2012

Leevan Sands (born August 16, 1981 Nassau) is a Bahamian triple jumper.

His personal best jump is 17.59 metres, achieved in 2008 Olympic Games in Beijing. This is the current Bahamian record and won a bronze medal. He also won bronze medals at the 2003 World Championships and 2002 Commonwealth Games.

Sands went to high school at Florida Air Academy and then jumped for the Auburn Tigers track and field team. He won NCAA Division I Men's Outdoor Track and Field Championships titles in the long jump at the 2003 NCAA Division I Outdoor Track and Field Championships and triple jump at the 2004 NCAA Division I Outdoor Track and Field Championships, and was runner-up in the triple jump at the 2003 championships. Additionally, Sands was 3rd in the long jump at the 2003 NCAA Division I Indoor Track and Field Championships, but was later promoted to 2nd after runner-up Frank Tolen was declared ineligible.

At the 2003 NCAA Division I Indoor Track and Field Championships, Sands He was suspended from March 2006 to September 2006 for testing positive on the prohibited substance levomethamphetamine.

Sands competed for the Bahamas in the 2016 Summer Olympics in Rio de Janeiro, but he did not qualify for the finals. He was the flag bearer for the closing ceremonies.

Sands is the cousin of hurdler Shamar Sands who is also the Bahamian record holder in his event.

Sands was coached most of his professional career by Henry Rolle.

== Achievements ==
- 2012 Olympic Games - fifth place
- 2008 Olympic Games - bronze medal
- 2007 Pan American Games - sixth place
- 2005 World Athletics Final - fifth place
- 2005 World Championships - fourth place
- 2010 World Athletics Final - sixth place
- 2012 World Athletics Final - seventh place
- 2003 World Championships - bronze medal
- 2002 Commonwealth Games - bronze medal
- 2002 World Junior Championships - fifth place
