= Athletics at the 2014 Asian Games – Men's long jump =

Men's long jump at the 2014 Asian Games
- Venue: Incheon Asiad Main Stadium
- Dates: 30 September 2014
- Competitors: 17 from 12 nations

Medalists
gold medal	Li Jinzhe	China
silver medal	Kim Deok-hyeon	South Korea
bronze medal	Gao Xinglong	China

The men's long jump event at the 2014 Asian Games was held at the Incheon Asiad Main Stadium, Incheon, South Korea on 30 September.

== Schedule ==
All times are Korea Standard Time (UTC+09:00)

Date	Time	Event
Tuesday, 30 September 2014	19:35	Final

== Records ==
Prior to this competition, the existing world, Asian and Games records were as follows.

World Record	Mike Powell (USA)	8.95	Tokyo, Japan	30 August 1991
Asian Record	Mohammed Al-Khuwalidi (KSA)	8.48	Sotteville, France	2 July 2006
Games Record	Hussein Al-Sabee (KSA)	8.14	Busan, South Korea	12 October 2002

== Results ==
Rank	Athlete	Attempt						Result	Notes
Rank	Athlete	1	2	3	4	5	6	Result	Notes
1st place, gold medalist(s)	Li Jinzhe (CHN)	8.00 +0.1	X +1.4	7.98 +0.7	X +0.3	8.01 −0.7	X +0.1	8.01	
2nd place, silver medalist(s)	Kim Deok-hyeon (KOR)	7.49 +0.5	7.73 +1.3	X −0.2	7.73 −0.3	X −0.2	7.90 −0.2	7.90	
3rd place, bronze medalist(s)	Gao Xinglong (CHN)	7.80 +0.6	7.74 +0.1	7.86 +0.5	7.76 −0.8	7.81 −0.4	X +0.4	7.86	
4	Supanara Sukhasvasti (THA)	X −0.2	7.59 +1.3	7.53; 0.0	7.81 +0.4	7.57 −0.8	X −0.5	7.81	
5	Chan Ming Tai (HKG)	7.55 +0.1	7.39 +0.5	7.73 +0.7	7.64 −0.2	7.55 −0.5	7.56 +0.2	7.73	
6	Mohammad Arzandeh (IRI)	7.47 +0.6	7.53 +0.5	7.53 +0.2	7.56 −0.4	7.53 +0.1	7.34 −0.3	7.56	
7	Nikita Loginov (UZB)	7.43 −0.2	7.42 +0.5	7.52 +0.2	7.39 +1.6	7.22 −1.6	X −0.5	7.52	
8	Konstantin Safronov (KAZ)	7.35 +0.8	7.47 +0.3	7.43 +0.3	7.24 +0.3	7.13 −1.0	X −0.4	7.47	
9	Wang Ming-en (TPE)	7.44 +0.4	X +0.6	7.21 +0.4				7.44	
10	Kirill Agoyev (KAZ)	7.44 +0.9	X +0.8	7.13 −1.0				7.44	
11	Henry Dagmil (PHI)	7.17; 0.0	7.35 +0.7	7.43 +1.1				7.43	
12	Ahmed Al-Sharfa (KSA)	7.32 −0.1	X +0.1	7.27 −0.2				7.32	
13	Saleh Al-Haddad (KUW)	7.30 +0.7	6.90 +0.5	7.10 +0.9				7.30	
14	Ahmed Faiz (KSA)	X +0.2	X +0.5	7.29 −0.1				7.29	
15	Janaka Wimalasiri (SRI)	X +0.6	7.22 −0.6	X +0.6				7.22	
16	Lin Hung-min (TPE)	7.06; 0.0	7.01; 0.0	X +0.7				7.06	
17	Mubarak Qambar (KUW)	X 0.0	6.59 +0.7	X +0.2				6.59	
