= Athletics at the 2006 Asian Games – Men's long jump =

Men's long jump at the 2006 Asian Games
- Venue: Khalifa International Stadium
- Dates: 8–9 December 2006
- Competitors: 20 from 15 nations

Medalists
gold medal	Hussein Al-Sabee	Saudi Arabia
silver medal	Saleh Al-Haddad	Kuwait
bronze medal	Ahmed Faiz	Saudi Arabia

The men's long jump competition at the 2006 Asian Games in Doha, Qatar was held on 8 and 9 December 2006 at the Khalifa International Stadium.

== Schedule ==
All times are Arabia Standard Time (UTC+03:00)

Date	Time	Event
Friday, 8 December 2006	09:20	Qualifying
Saturday, 9 December 2006	15:00	Final

== Records ==
Prior to this competition, the existing world, Asian and Games records were as follows.

World Record	Mike Powell (USA)	8.95	Tokyo, Japan	30 August 1991
Asian Record	Mohammed Al-Khuwalidi (KSA)	8.48	Sotteville, France	2 July 2006
Games Record	Hussein Al-Sabee (KSA)	8.14	Busan, South Korea	12 October 2002

== Results ==
Legend

- DNS — Did not start
- NM — No mark

=== Qualifying ===
- Qualification: Qualifying performance 7.60 (Q) or at least 12 best performers (q) advance to the final.

Rank	Group	Athlete	Attempt			Result	Notes
Rank	Group	Athlete	1	2	3	Result	Notes
1	B	Ahmed Faiz (KSA)	7.94; 0.0			7.94	Q
2	B	Henry Dagmil (PHI)	7.48; 0.0	7.78 −0.2		7.78	Q
3	B	Zhang Xiaoyi (CHN)	7.40 −0.5	6.01; 0.0	7.77 −0.3	7.77	Q
4	A	Hussein Al-Sabee (KSA)	7.67; 0.0			7.67	Q
5	A	Joebert Delicano (PHI)	7.39 +1.0	7.66 +0.1		7.66	Q
6	A	Saleh Al-Haddad (KUW)	7.43; 0.0	7.63 +0.6		7.63	Q
7	B	Chao Chih-chien (TPE)	7.50 −0.3	7.55 −0.3	7.52 −0.2	7.55	q
8	A	Kenji Fujikawa (JPN)	7.54 +1.6	7.51 +0.8	7.39 −0.1	7.54	q
9	A	Shiv Shankar Yadav (IND)	7.51 +0.2	X	X	7.51	q
10	B	Konstantin Safronov (KAZ)	6.77 +0.2	7.49; 0.0	7.39 −0.8	7.49	q
11	A	Ibrahim Mohamedin (QAT)	7.22 +0.7	7.48 +0.6	7.06 −0.1	7.48	q
12	B	Husein Al-Youhah (KUW)	X	X	7.21 −0.3	7.21	q
13	A	Marc Habib (LIB)	6.55 −0.8	X	7.04 +1.8	7.04	
14	B	Ali Abdulla Abdulmalek (BRN)	X	6.96; 0.0	X	6.96	
15	A	Mohammad Arzandeh (IRI)	X	X	6.92 −0.5	6.92	
16	B	Nayana Prasad Dharmaratne (SRI)	X	X	6.71 +0.2	6.71	
17	A	Tsai I-ta (TPE)	X	X	5.26 +0.7	5.26	
—	B	Kisei Nakamoto (JPN)	X	X	X	NM	
—	A	Nguyễn Mạnh Hiếu (VIE)	X	X	X	NM	
—	B	Leong Kin Kuan (MAC)				DNS	

=== Final ===
Rank	Athlete	Attempt						Result	Notes
Rank	Athlete	1	2	3	4	5	6	Result	Notes
1st place, gold medalist(s)	Hussein Al-Sabee (KSA)	X	7.65 −1.1	8.02 +0.7	X	8.00 −0.1	X	8.02	
2nd place, silver medalist(s)	Saleh Al-Haddad (KUW)	7.73 +0.7	7.67 −1.4	7.80 +0.3	7.82 +0.2	7.77 +1.3	7.88 +0.6	7.88	
3rd place, bronze medalist(s)	Ahmed Faiz (KSA)	X	X	7.44 −0.6	7.53 −1.1	7.68 +1.7	7.85 +1.2	7.85	
4	Zhang Xiaoyi (CHN)	7.29 +1.0	7.78 +0.5	7.49 +0.5	7.69 +1.3	7.73 +0.9	7.58 +2.0	7.78	
5	Henry Dagmil (PHI)	7.62 +0.3	7.58 +1.4	7.61 −1.1	7.74; 0.0	7.76 +0.4	X	7.76	
6	Kenji Fujikawa (JPN)	7.57 +1.9	X	X	7.45 +0.2	7.64 −0.2	7.69 +0.3	7.69	
7	Shiv Shankar Yadav (IND)	X	X	7.48 +0.4	7.64 −0.6	X	7.52 +1.3	7.64	
8	Joebert Delicano (PHI)	7.56 +2.0	7.33 −0.3	7.33; 0.0	7.15 +0.3	X	—	7.56	
9	Chao Chih-chien (TPE)	X	7.23 −0.6	7.39 −0.3				7.39	
10	Ibrahim Mohamedin (QAT)	7.38 +1.1	X	7.29 +1.3				7.38	
11	Husein Al-Youhah (KUW)	X	7.30 −0.1	7.21 +0.3				7.30	
12	Konstantin Safronov (KAZ)	6.94 −0.5	7.25 +1.5	7.28 +0.3				7.28	
