= Athletics at the 2010 Asian Games – Men's long jump =

Men's long jump at the 2010 Asian Games
- Venue: Aoti Main Stadium
- Date: 24 November 2010
- Competitors: 12 from 9 nations

Medalists
gold medal	Kim Deok-hyeon	South Korea
silver medal	Su Xiongfeng	China
bronze medal	Hussein Al-Sabee	Saudi Arabia

The men's long jump event at the 2010 Asian Games was held at the Aoti Main Stadium, Guangzhou, China on 24 November.

== Schedule ==
All times are China Standard Time (UTC+08:00)

Date	Time	Event
Wednesday, 24 November 2010	17:20	Final

== Records ==
Prior to this competition, the existing world, Asian and Games records were as follows.

World Record	Mike Powell (USA)	8.95	Tokyo, Japan	30 August 1991
Asian Record	Mohammed Al-Khuwalidi (KSA)	8.48	Sotteville, France	2 July 2006
Games Record	Hussein Al-Sabee (KSA)	8.14	Busan, South Korea	12 October 2002

== Results ==
Legend

- NM — No mark

Rank	Athlete	Attempt						Result	Notes
Rank	Athlete	1	2	3	4	5	6	Result	Notes
1st place, gold medalist(s)	Kim Deok-hyeon (KOR)	X −0.3	7.95 −0.8	X −0.6	X −0.6	8.11 −0.2	—	8.11	
2nd place, silver medalist(s)	Su Xiongfeng (CHN)	7.82 −0.2	8.05 −0.2	7.85 −0.5	7.93 −0.6	X −0.3	X −0.6	8.05	
3rd place, bronze medalist(s)	Hussein Al-Sabee (KSA)	7.83 +0.1	X −0.8	X −0.9	7.90 −0.5	7.88 −0.2	7.96 −0.8	7.96	
4	Yohei Sugai (JPN)	7.63 −0.2	7.53 −0.3	X −0.5	7.53 −0.8	X −0.2	X −0.8	7.63	
5	Supanara Sukhasvasti (THA)	X −0.4	7.27 −0.9	7.54 −0.6	X −0.8	7.49 −0.5	X −0.8	7.54	
6	Henry Dagmil (PHI)	7.37 +0.7	7.46 −0.3	7.42 −0.4	7.52 −0.4	X −0.7	X −0.7	7.52	
7	Maha Singh (IND)	7.36 −0.4	7.44 −0.5	X −0.6	X −0.5	7.44 −1.1	—	7.44	
8	Konstantin Safronov (KAZ)	7.41 −0.7	X −0.7	7.32 −0.6	7.20 −0.4	7.33 −0.7	X −0.7	7.41	
9	Ankit Sharma (IND)	X +0.1	X −0.4	7.19 −0.6				7.19	
10	Lin Ching-hsuan (TPE)	X +0.5	X −0.6	7.08 −0.5				7.08	
11	Mohammed Al-Khuwalidi (KSA)	X +0.6	X −0.6	6.78 −0.4				6.78	
—	Li Jinzhe (CHN)	—	—	—				NM	
