= Track and field at the 2015 Military World Games – Men's long jump =

The men's long jump event at the 2015 Military World Games was held on 5 and 6 October at the KAFAC Sports Complex.

== Records ==
Prior to this competition, the existing world and CISM record were as follows:

| World Record | Mike Powell (USA) | 8.95 | Tokyo, Japan | 30 August 1991 |
| CISM World Record | Stanislav Tarasenko (RUS) | 8.24 | | 1993 |

== Schedule ==
| Date | Time | Round |
|---|---|---|
| 5 October 2015 | 10:45 | Qualification |
| 6 October 2015 | 16:15 | Final |

== Medalists ==
| Gold | Silver | Bronze |
|---|---|---|
| Pavel Shalin; Russia | Valentin Toboc; Romania | Lu Tianjie; China |

== Results ==
=== Qualification ===
Qualification: 7.75 m (Q) or at least 12 best (q) qualified for the final.

| Rank | Group | Athlete | Nationality | #1 | #2 | #3 | Mark | Notes |
|---|---|---|---|---|---|---|---|---|
| 1 | B | Kim Jang-jun | South Korea | 7.71 (0.0 m/s) | 7.50 (+1.1 m/s) | 7.47 (+2.1 m/s) | 7.71 (0.0 m/s) | q |
| 2 | B | Valentin Toboc | Romania | 7.65 (+0.9 m/s) | x | 7.62 (+1.4 m/s) | 7.65 (+0.9 m/s) | q |
| 3 | A | Pavel Shalin | Russia | 7.30 (+1.9 m/s) | 7.63 (+1.7 m/s) | x | 7.63 (+1.7 m/s) | q |
| 4 | B | Ahmed Binmarzouq | Saudi Arabia | x | 7.54 (+0.8 m/s) | 7.26 (+1.7 m/s) | 7.54 (+0.8 m/s) | q |
| 5 | B | M. Arshad | India | 7.21 (+1.9 m/s) | x | 7.35 (+1.9 m/s) | 7.35 (+1.9 m/s) | q |
| 6 | B | Mohammad Arzandeh | Iran | 7.33 (+1.2 m/s) | x | 7.11 (+0.8 m/s) | 7.33 (+1.2 m/s) | q |
| 7 | A | Higor Alves | Brazil | x | 7.27 (+2.8 m/s) | x | 7.27 (+2.8 m/s) | q |
| 8 | B | Lu Tianjie | China | 7.24 (+1.4 m/s) | 7.24 (+0.6 m/s) | 7.24 (+0.9 m/s) | 7.24 (+1.4 m/s) | q |
| 9 | B | Georgios Poullos | Cyprus | 6.99 (+0.3 m/s) | x | 7.21 (+0.7 m/s) | 7.21 (+0.7 m/s) | q |
| 10 | B | Giorgi Gureshidze | Georgia | 7.21 (+1.9 m/s) | 6.92 (+1.8 m/s) | 6.98 (+1.9 m/s) | 7.21 (+1.9 m/s) | q |
| 11 | A | Adrian Świderski | Poland | 7.06 (+0.8 m/s) | 7.13 (+1.4 m/s) | 7.19 (+2.0 m/s) | 7.19 (+2.0 m/s) | q |
| 12 | A | Benjamin Gföhler | Switzerland | 7.16 (+0.9 m/s) | 7.06 (+1.0 m/s) | x | 7.16 (+0.8 m/s) | q |
| 13 | A | Elijah kiplagat Kimitei | Kenya | 7.10 (+0.9 m/s) | x | 6.95 (+1.5 m/s) | 7.10 (+0.9 m/s) | |
| 14 | A | Mohamed Ahmed Al-Mannai | Qatar | 7.03 (+2.3 m/s) | 6.89 (+1.2 m/s) | x | 7.03 (+2.3 m/s) | |
| 15 | B | Alyn Camara | Germany | 6.98 (+0.1 m/s) | x | x | 6.98 (+0.1 m/s) | |
| 16 | B | Parnelle Shands | United States | 6.52 (+2.0 m/s) | 6.89 (+1.4 m/s) | 6.90 (+1.8 m/s) | 6.90 (+1.8 m/s) | |
| 17 | B | Jaun Dhal | Suriname | x | 6.85 (+0.5 m/s) | 6.69 (-0.4 m/s) | 6.85 (+0.5 m/s) | |
| 18 | A | Oronde Vassell | United States | x | 6.49 (+2.0 m/s) | 6.23 (+0.5 m/s) | 6.49 (+2.0 m/s) | |
| | A | Jithin Thomas | India | x | x | x | NM | |
| | A | Yu Zhenwei | China | x | – | – | NM | |
| | A | Hussein Taher Al-Sabee | Saudi Arabia | | | | DNS | |
| | A | Emmanuel Chimdzeka | Malawi | | | | DNS | |
| | B | Pethias Barclays Gondwe Mdoka | Malawi | | | | DNS | |

=== Final ===
| Rank | Athlete | Nationality | #1 | #2 | #3 | #4 | #5 | #6 | Mark | Notes |
|---|---|---|---|---|---|---|---|---|---|---|
| 1st place, gold medalist(s) | Pavel Shalin | Russia | 7.55 (-0.5 m/s) | 7.46 (-1.4 m/s) | 7.49 (+0.4 m/s) | 7.59 (-0.4 m/s) | 7.62 (-0.6 m/s) | 7.66 (-0.1 m/s) | 7.66 (-0.1 m/s) | |
| 2nd place, silver medalist(s) | Valentin Toboc | Romania | x | 7.37 (-0.9 m/s) | 7.50 (-0.4 m/s) | x | 7.64 (-0.7 m/s) | 7.54 (-0.2 m/s) | 7.64 (-0.7 m/s) | |
| 3rd place, bronze medalist(s) | Lu Tianjie | China | 7.63 (+2.2 m/s) | x | x | 7.24 (0.0 m/s) | x | 7.48 (-1.3 m/s) | 7.63 (+2.2 m/s) | |
| 4 | Kim Jang-jun | South Korea | 7.16 (+0.8 m/s) | 7.21 (-0.6 m/s) | 7.28 (-0.8 m/s) | 7.41 (-0.8 m/s) | 7.50 (-0.5 m/s) | 7.58 (-0.9 m/s) | 7.58 (-0.9 m/s) | |
| 5 | Higor Alves | Brazil | 7.13 (-0.8 m/s) | 7.40 (+0.3 m/s) | 7.19 (-0.5 m/s) | 7.49 (-0.7 m/s) | x | 7.21 (-1.1 m/s) | 7.49 (-0.7 m/s) | |
| 6 | Ahmed Binmarzouq | Saudi Arabia | 7.26 (-0.2 m/s) | 7.35 (-2.0 m/s) | 7.34 (-1.3 m/s) | 7.14 (-1.7 m/s) | 7.30 (-0.1 m/s) | 7.20 (-1.5 m/s) | 7.35 (-2.0 m/s) | |
| 7 | Benjamin Gföhler | Switzerland | 7.21 (-1.0 m/s) | 7.04 (+0.0 m/s) | x | 7.11 (-0.5 m/s) | x | x | 7.21 (-1.0 m/s) | |
| 8 | Adrian Świderski | Poland | 7.08 (-0.1 m/s) | 7.19 (-0.1 m/s) | 6.96 (-1.1 m/s) | – | – | – | 7.19 (-0.1 m/s) | |
| 9 | Georgios Poullos | Cyprus | 5.46 (+1.3 m/s) | 7.12 (+0.1 m/s) | 4.88 (-2.1 m/s) | | | | 7.12 (+0.1 m/s) | |
| 10 | M. Arshad | India | x | x | 7.02 (-2.7 m/s) | | | | 7.02 (+-2.7 m/s) | |
| 11 | Giorgi Gureshidze | Georgia | 6.99 (+0.8 m/s) | – | – | | | | 6.99 (+0.8 m/s) | |
| | Mohammad Arzandeh | Iran | | | | | | | DNS | |
