= 2003 Asian Athletics Championships – Men's long jump =

The men's long jump event at the 2003 Asian Athletics Championships was held in Manila, Philippines on September 21–23.

== Medalists ==
Gold	Silver	Bronze
Hussein Al-Sabee; Saudi Arabia	Zhou Can; China	Shinichi Terano; Japan

== Results ==
=== Qualification ===
Rank	Name	Nationality	Result	Notes
1	Abdulrahman Al-Nubi	Qatar	8.13	q, NR
2	Shinichi Terano	Japan	7.85	q
3	Daisuke Arakawa	Japan	7.84	q
4	Zhou Can	China	7.81	q
5	Mohammed Al-Khuwalidi	Saudi Arabia	7.73	q
6	Hussein Al-Sabee	Saudi Arabia	7.71	q
7	Joebert Delicano	Philippines	7.56	q, SB
8	Wayne Peppin	India	7.52	q
9	Mohd Hazuan Zainal Abidin	Malaysia	7.52	q
10	Waseem Khan	Pakistan	7.51	q
11	Nguyen Van Mua	Vietnam	7.46	q
12	Al-Waleed Abdulla	Qatar	7.42	q
13	Maha Singh	India	7.39	
14	Mehdi Amini	Iran	7.37	
15	Nattaporn Nomkanha	Thailand	7.34	SB
16	David Sampath Nuwan	Sri Lanka	7.27	
17	Chao Chih-Chien	Chinese Taipei	7.27	
18	Shahrul Amri Suhaimi	Malaysia	7.21	
19	Henry Dagmil	Philippines	7.21	SB
20	Vuong Nguyen Long	Vietnam	6.88	SB
21	Leong Kin Kuan	Macau	6.80	SB
22	Chaleunsook Adoudomphonh	Laos	6.71	PB
	Raphie Pilaspilas	Philippines	NM	

=== Final ===
Rank	Name	Nationality	Result	Notes
1st place, gold medalist(s)	Hussein Al-Sabee	Saudi Arabia	8.23	
2nd place, silver medalist(s)	Zhou Can	China	8.11	=PB
3rd place, bronze medalist(s)	Shinichi Terano	Japan	8.04	SB
4	Abdulrahman Al-Nubi	Qatar	7.88	
5	Daisuke Arakawa	Japan	7.77	
6	Al-Waleed Abdulla	Qatar	7.76	
7	Mohd Hazuan Zainal Abidin	Malaysia	7.72	PB
8	Wayne Peppin	India	7.66	
9	Mohammed Al-Khuwalidi	Saudi Arabia	7.63	
10	Joebert Delicano	Philippines	7.55	
11	Waseem Khan	Pakistan	7.23	
12	Nguyen Van Mua	Vietnam	7.00	
