= 2011 Asian Athletics Championships – Men's long jump =

The Men's long jump event took place on July 10, 2011, at the Kobe Universiade Memorial Stadium.

== Medalists ==
Gold	Su Xiongfeng; China
Silver	Supanara Sukhasvasti; Thailand
Bronze	Rikiya Saruyama; Japan

== Records ==
World record	Mike Powell (USA)	8.95	Tokyo, Japan	30 August 1991
Asian record	Mohamed Salman Al-Khuwalidi (KSA)	8.48	Sotteville, France	2 July 2006
Championship record	Hussein Taher Al-Sabee (KSA)	8.33	Jakarta, Indonesia	2000

== Results ==
=== Final ===
Rank	Athlete	Nationality	#1	#2	#3	#4	#5	#6	Result
1st place, gold medalist(s)	Su Xiongfeng	China	7.22	8.19	7.91	x	8.13	x	8.19
2nd place, silver medalist(s)	Supanara Sukhasvasti	Thailand	x	8.05	7.74	x	x	x	8.05
3rd place, bronze medalist(s)	Rikiya Saruyama	Japan	7.61	8.05	x	x	x	x	8.05
4	Yohei Sugai	Japan	8.03	7.73	7.78	8.00	7.61	7.94	8.03
5	Li Jinzhe	China	7.46	7.79	7.50	x	x	x	7.79
6	Hashim al-Sharfa	Saudi Arabia	7.38	7.77	7.56	x	6.87	–	7.77
7	Dmitrii Ilin	Kyrgyzstan	7.51	7.44	7.48	x	x	7.64	7.64
8	Konstantin Safronov	Kazakhstan	7.48	7.62	x	x	–	–	7.62
9	Van Mua Nguyen	Vietnam	7.38	7.39	7.31				7.39
10	Lin Ching-hsuan	Chinese Taipei	7.25	x	7.32				7.32
11	Wong Lok Hei	Hong Kong	x	6.96	6.90				6.96
12	Ghulam Shareq Hamkar	Afghanistan	6.38	x	6.02				6.38
–	Si Kuan Wong	Macau							DNS
