= 2009 Asian Athletics Championships – Men's long jump =

The men's long jump event at the 2009 Asian Athletics Championships was held at the Guangdong Olympic Stadium on November 12.

== Results ==
Rank	Athlete	Nationality	#1	#2	#3	#4	#5	#6	Result	Notes
1st place, gold medalist(s)	Li Jinzhe	China	7.56	7.69w	8.02	7.85	8.16	–	8.16	
2nd place, silver medalist(s)	Hussein Taher Al-Sabee	Saudi Arabia	x	7.59	7.96	x	7.85	7.96	7.96	
3rd place, bronze medalist(s)	Yu Zhenwei	China	7.78	x	7.76	x	7.96w	7.95	7.96w	
4	Kim Deok-hyeon	South Korea	7.81	7.85	x	x	x	7.93	7.93	
5	Ahmed Faiz	Saudi Arabia	x	7.68	7.75	x	7.81	x	7.81	
6	Yohei Sugai	Japan	7.52w	7.52	7.76	7.63	7.64	7.78	7.78	
7	Mahan Singh	India	x	7.50	x	7.60	7.67w	x	7.67w	
8	Saleh Al-Haddad	Kuwait	7.07	7.32	7.35	7.20	x	–	7.35	
9	Maksim Belyayev	Kazakhstan	x	6.93w	6.84				6.93w	
	Chao Chih-chien	Chinese Taipei	x	x	x				NM	
	Goh Matthew	Singapore	x	x	x				NM	
	Konstantin Safronov	Kazakhstan	x	x	x				NM	
