= 2002 Asian Athletics Championships – Men's long jump =

The men's long jump event at the 2002 Asian Athletics Championships was held in Colombo, Sri Lanka on 10–12 August.

== Medalists ==
Gold	Silver	Bronze
Hussein Al-Sabee; Saudi Arabia	Cai Xiaobao; China	Huang Le; China

== Results ==
=== Qualification ===
Rank	Name	Nationality	Result	Notes
1	Huang Le	China	7.77	Q
2	Al-Waleed Abdulla	Qatar	7.75	Q
3	Joebert Delicano	Philippines	7.64w	Q
4	Hussein Al-Sabee	Saudi Arabia	7.64	Q
5	Cai Xiaobao	China	7.57	Q
6	Satoru Habu	Japan	7.52	Q
7	Kim Tae-Bin	South Korea	7.52	Q
8	Ali Masoud Al-Hawari	Qatar	7.50	Q
9	Dmitriy Karpov	Kazakhstan	7.49	q
10	Masaki Morinaga	Japan	7.48	q
11	Sujith Rohitha	Sri Lanka	7.37	q
12	Rustam Khusnutdinov	Uzbekistan	7.32	q
13	Mohamed Imam Bakhash	Bahrain	7.32	SB
14	Lalith Ravindra Weerakkody	Sri Lanka	7.19	
15	Hsu Chih-Hsiung	Chinese Taipei	7.08	
16	Rohana Perera	Sri Lanka	6.95	SB
17	Chaleunsouk Oudomphanh	Laos	6.70	SB
18	Riyad Al-Shalabi	Jordan	6.58	PB
	Mohammed Al-Khuwalidi	Saudi Arabia	NM	

=== Final ===
Rank	Name	Nationality	Result	Notes
1st place, gold medalist(s)	Hussein Al-Sabee	Saudi Arabia	8.09	
2nd place, silver medalist(s)	Cai Xiaobao	China	7.95w	
3rd place, bronze medalist(s)	Huang Le	China	7.91w	
4	Kim Tae-Bin	South Korea	7.88w	
5	Masaki Morinaga	Japan	7.87	SB
6	Al-Waleed Abdulla	Qatar	7.79	
7	Satoru Habu	Japan	7.75	SB
8	Dmitriy Karpov	Kazakhstan	7.70	
9	Joebert Delicano	Philippines	7.58	SB
10	Rustam Khusnutdinov	Uzbekistan	7.49w	
11	Ali Masoud Al-Hawari	Qatar	7.46	
12	Sujith Rohitha	Sri Lanka	7.43w	
