= 2015 Asian Athletics Championships – Men's long jump =

The men's long jump event at the 2015 Asian Athletics Championships was held on June 3 and 4.

== Medalists ==
Gold	Gao Xinglong; China
Silver	Ted Hooper; Chinese Taipei
Bronze	Tang Gongchen; China

== Results ==
=== Qualification ===
Rank	Name	Nationality	#1	#2	#3	Result	Notes
1	Tang Gongchen	China	7.76			7.76	Q
2	Yohei Sugai	Japan	7.67	7.75		7.75	Q
3	Ted Hooper	Chinese Taipei	7.40	7.74	–	7.74	q
4	Ahmed Binmarzouq	Saudi Arabia	7.67	–	–	7.67	q
5	Gao Xinglong	China	7.62	7.66	–	7.66	q
6	Saleh Al-Haddad	Kuwait	7.64	7.55	–	7.64	q
7	Konstantin Safronov	Kazakhstan	x	7.64	x	7.64	q
8	Ankit Sharma	India	7.33	x	7.56	7.56	q
9	Lin Hung-Min	Chinese Taipei	7.27	7.55	7.48	7.55	q
10	Andrey Reznichenko	Uzbekistan	7.36	7.51	7.51	7.51	q
11	Kumaravel Premkumar	India	x	7.40	7.51	7.51	q
12	Chan Ming Tai	Hong Kong	7.45	x	x	7.45	q
13	Sobhan Taherkhani	Iran	7.29	7.43	x	7.43	
14	Kota Minemura	Japan	x	x	7.34	7.34	
15	Joo Eun-jae	South Korea	x	7.29	?	7.29	
16	Sung Jin-suok	South Korea	x	7.26	x	7.26	
17	Muhannad Qasem Al-Absi	Saudi Arabia	x	7.23	x	7.23	
18	Timur Khusnulin	Uzbekistan	6.83	7.06	7.05	7.06	
19	Benigno Marayag	Philippines	7.01	6.98	x	7.01	
20	Abdulrahman Khamis	Bahrain	6.81	6.98	x	6.98	
21	Pang Kam Fung	Hong Kong	x	6.52	6.81	6.81	
	Huang Changzhou	China	x	x	x	NM	
	Julian Reem Fuentes	Philippines				DNS	

=== Final ===
Rank	Name	Nationality	#1	#2	#3	#4	#5	#6	Result	Notes
1st place, gold medalist(s)	Gao Xinglong	China	7.96	x	x	7.81	7.71	7.90	7.96	
2nd place, silver medalist(s)	Ted Hooper	Chinese Taipei	x	7.54	7.76	7.80	7.59	7.79	7.80	
3rd place, bronze medalist(s)	Tang Gongchen	China	7.50	7.70	7.72	7.60	x	7.79	7.79	
4	Ankit Sharma	India	x	7.55	7.76	7.56	7.54	x	7.76	
5	Kumaravel Premkumar	India	7.41	7.54	7.60	7.53	7.69	7.54	7.69	
6	Yohei Sugai	Japan	7.57	7.27	x	7.60	7.35	7.67	7.67	
7	Ahmed Binmarzouq	Saudi Arabia	7.55	7.12	x	7.25	x	7.23	7.55	
8	Konstantin Safronov	Kazakhstan	7.44	7.32	7.06	7.45	7.28	x	7.45	
9	Chan Ming Tai	Hong Kong	x	x	7.44				7.44	
10	Saleh Al-Haddad	Kuwait	x	7.29	x				7.29	
11	Lin Hung-Min	Chinese Taipei	7.28	x	7.27				7.28	
12	Andrey Reznichenko	Uzbekistan	7.22	7.22	7.25				7.25	
