= Athletics at the 2002 Asian Games – Men's long jump =

Men's long jump at the 2002 Asian Games
- Venue: Busan Asiad Main Stadium
- Date: 12 October 2002
- Competitors: 13 from 8 nations

Medalists
gold medal	Hussein Al-Sabee	Saudi Arabia
silver medal	Li Dalong	China
bronze medal	Al-Waleed Abdulla	Qatar

The men's long jump competition at the 2002 Asian Games in Busan, South Korea was held on 12 October at the Busan Asiad Main Stadium.

== Schedule ==
All times are Korea Standard Time (UTC+09:00)

Date	Time	Event
Saturday, 12 October 2002	15:00	Final

== Records ==
Prior to this competition, the existing world, Asian and Games records were as follows.

World Record	Mike Powell (USA)	8.95	Tokyo, Japan	30 August 1991
Asian Record	Lao Jianfeng (CHN)	8.40	Zhaoqing, China	28 May 1997
Games Record	Huang Baoting (CHN)	8.12	Hiroshima, Japan	12 October 1994

== Results ==
Legend

- DNS — Did not start
- NM — No mark

Rank	Athlete	Attempt						Result	Notes
Rank	Athlete	1	2	3	4	5	6	Result	Notes
1st place, gold medalist(s)	Hussein Al-Sabee (KSA)	7.85 +0.4	8.14 +0.7	8.04 +0.1	5.98; 0.0	7.96; 0.0	7.88; 0.0	8.14	GR
2nd place, silver medalist(s)	Li Dalong (CHN)	X	X	7.61 −0.1	7.99 −0.2	X	X	7.99	
3rd place, bronze medalist(s)	Al-Waleed Abdulla (QAT)	7.39 +0.3	7.71 +0.4	7.49 +0.2	X	7.80 −0.4	X	7.80	
4	Huang Le (CHN)	7.63 −0.3	7.69 −0.2	7.73 +0.9	X	7.75 +0.2	X	7.75	
5	Shinichi Terano (JPN)	7.01 +0.5	7.67 +0.1	7.75 +0.2	X	7.71 −0.2	X	7.75	
6	Said Mansoor (QAT)	7.61; 0.0	7.62 +0.6	X	7.62 −0.1	—	—	7.62	
7	Kim Tae-bin (KOR)	7.62 +0.4	X	X	X	X	X	7.62	
8	Joebert Delicano (PHI)	X	7.49 +0.5	X	X	6.98 +0.4	7.39 +0.4	7.49	
9	Mohammed Al-Khuwalidi (KSA)	7.32 +0.1	X	X				7.32	
10	Boonyarit Phuksachat (THA)	X	X	7.23 +0.7				7.23	
11	Mohamed Imam Bakhsh (BRN)	X	X	6.72 −0.7				6.72	
—	Masaki Morinaga (JPN)	X	—	—				NM	
—	Nattaporn Namkanha (THA)							DNS	
