= 2010 World Junior Championships in Athletics – Men's long jump =

The men's long jump event at the 2010 World Junior Championships in Athletics was held in Moncton, New Brunswick, Canada, at Moncton Stadium on 20 and 21 July.

== Medalists ==
Gold	Luvo Manyonga; South Africa
Silver	Eusebio Cáceres; Spain
Bronze	Taylor Stewart; Canada

== Results ==
=== Final ===
21 July

Rank	Name	Nationality	Attempts						Result	Notes
Rank	Name	Nationality	1	2	3	4	5	6	Result	Notes
1st place, gold medalist(s)	Luvo Manyonga	South Africa	7.62 (w: -1.3 m/s)	7.69 (w: -1.4 m/s)	7.67 (w: -1.3 m/s)	7.56 (w: -0.8 m/s)	7.70 (w: -0.6 m/s)	7.99 (w: -1.0 m/s)	7.99 (w: -1.0 m/s)	
2nd place, silver medalist(s)	Eusebio Cáceres	Spain	7.60 (w: -1.6 m/s)	7.41 (w: -0.7 m/s)	7.37 (w: -1.5 m/s)	7.64 (w: -0.7 m/s)	7.72 (w: -0.6 m/s)	7.90 (w: -1.2 m/s)	7.90 (w: -1.2 m/s)	
3rd place, bronze medalist(s)	Taylor Stewart	Canada	x	7.33 (w: -1.3 m/s)	7.48 (w: -1.0 m/s)	7.43 (w: -0.9 m/s)	7.36 (w: -1.2 m/s)	7.63 (w: -0.7 m/s)	7.63 (w: -0.7 m/s)	
4	Caio Cézar dos Santos	Brazil	x	7.32 (w: NWI)	7.18 (w: -1.4 m/s)	7.21 (w: -0.9 m/s)	7.30 (w: -1.0 m/s)	7.53 (w: -0.6 m/s)	7.53 (w: -0.6 m/s)	
5	Jhamal Bowen	Panama	7.49 (w: -1.4 m/s)	7.43 (w: -2.0 m/s)	x	x	7.32 (w: -1.2 m/s)	7.45 (w: -0.8 m/s)	7.49 (w: -1.4 m/s)	
6	Justin Hunter	United States	7.35 (w: -1.1 m/s)	7.47 (w: -0.9 m/s)	7.21 (w: -0.7 m/s)	x	x	7.28 (w: -0.3 m/s)	7.47 (w: -0.9 m/s)	
7	Lin Ching-hsuan	Chinese Taipei	7.10 (w: -0.5 m/s)	7.43 (w: -0.7 m/s)	7.27 (w: -0.5 m/s)	7.19 (w: -1.4 m/s)	7.23 (w: -0.7 m/s)	7.07 (w: -0.5 m/s)	7.43 (w: -0.7 m/s)	
8	Ankit Sharma	India	7.09 (w: -0.4 m/s)	7.30 (w: -1.8 m/s)	7.25 (w: -0.4 m/s)	7.40 (w: -1.0 m/s)	7.36 (w: -0.8 m/s)	x	7.40 (w: -1.0 m/s)	
9	Kamal Fuller	Jamaica	x	7.01 (w: NWI)	7.29 (w: -0.9 m/s)				7.29 (w: -0.9 m/s)	
10	Lourival Neto	Brazil	x	x	7.20 (w: -0.9 m/s)				7.20 (w: -0.9 m/s)	
11	Raymond Higgs	Bahamas	6.99 (w: NWI)	7.09 (w: -0.8 m/s)	6.99 (w: -1.7 m/s)				7.09 (w: -0.8 m/s)	
	Supanara Sukhasvasti	Thailand							DNS	

=== Qualifications ===
20 July

==== Group A ====
Rank	Name	Nationality	Attempts			Result	Notes
Rank	Name	Nationality	1	2	3	Result	Notes
1	Eusebio Cáceres	Spain	7.70 (w: +0.3 m/s)	-	-	7.70 (w: +0.3 m/s)	Q
2	Justin Hunter	United States	7.64 (w: -0.1 m/s)	x	6.64 (w: +0.6 m/s)	7.64 (w: -0.1 m/s)	q
3	Ankit Sharma	India	x	7.29 (w: -0.1 m/s)	7.60 (w: +0.4 m/s)	7.60 (w: +0.4 m/s)	q
4	Raymond Higgs	Bahamas	7.14 (w: +0.1 m/s)	7.13 (w: -0.7 m/s)	7.50 (w: +0.6 m/s)	7.50 (w: +0.6 m/s)	q
5	Supanara Sukhasvasti	Thailand	7.48 (w: +0.8 m/s)	7.31 (w: +0.3 m/s)	-	7.48 (w: +0.8 m/s)	q
6	Camillo Kaborè	Italy	5.81 (w: -0.4 m/s)	7.18 (w: -0.4 m/s)	7.45 (w: +0.7 m/s)	7.45 (w: +0.7 m/s)	
7	Yang Kai	China	x	7.24 (w: +0.2 m/s)	7.44 (w: +0.6 m/s)	7.44 (w: +0.6 m/s)	
8	Nikita Pankins	Latvia	6.97 (w: -0.4 m/s)	6.82 (w: -0.3 m/s)	7.40 (w: +0.8 m/s)	7.40 (w: +0.8 m/s)	
9	Christodoulos Theofilou	Cyprus	x	7.11 (w: -0.6 m/s)	7.35 (w: +0.6 m/s)	7.35 (w: +0.6 m/s)	
10	Hwang Hyeon-Tae	South Korea	6.98 (w: +0.7 m/s)	7.04 (w: +0.1 m/s)	7.30 (w: +0.4 m/s)	7.30 (w: +0.4 m/s)	
11	Mark Jacobs	Netherlands	7.02 (w: +0.3 m/s)	7.23 (w: +0.4 m/s)	7.28 (w: +0.3 m/s)	7.28 (w: +0.3 m/s)	
12	Vladimir Golovin	Russia	x	7.24 (w: +0.3 m/s)	x	7.24 (w: +0.3 m/s)	
13	Stefan Brits	South Africa	7.18 (w: 0.0 m/s)	x	-	7.18 (w: 0.0 m/s)	
14	Marcel Kirstges	Germany	x	7.13 (w: 0.0 m/s)	7.06 (w: +0.5 m/s)	7.13 (w: 0.0 m/s)	
15	Vadzim Maliankou	Belarus	6.99 (w: -0.1 m/s)	x	6.98 (w: NWI)	6.99 (w: -0.1 m/s)	
16	Paul Madzivire	Zimbabwe	6.94 (w: -0.1 m/s)	6.95 (w: 0.0 m/s)	6.92 (w: +0.7 m/s)	6.95 (w: 0.0 m/s)	
17	Alper Kulaksiz	Turkey	6.89 (w: +0.4 m/s)	6.71 (w: +0.2 m/s)	6.85 (w: +0.4 m/s)	6.89 (w: +0.4 m/s)	
	Łukasz Masłowski	Poland	x	x	x	NM	

==== Group B ====
Rank	Name	Nationality	Attempts			Result	Notes
Rank	Name	Nationality	1	2	3	Result	Notes
1	Luvo Manyonga	South Africa	x	6.28 (w: -0.4 m/s)	7.76 (w: -0.3 m/s)	7.76 (w: -0.3 m/s)	Q
2	Taylor Stewart	Canada	7.75 (w: +0.1 m/s)	-	-	7.75 (w: +0.1 m/s)	Q
3	Caio Cézar dos Santos	Brazil	x	7.73 (w: 0.0 m/s)	-	7.73 (w: 0.0 m/s)	Q
3	Kamal Fuller	Jamaica	x	7.73 (w: +0.7 m/s)	-	7.73 (w: +0.7 m/s)	Q
5	Jhamal Bowen	Panama	7.59 (w: -0.1 m/s)	7.54 (w: +0.1 m/s)	7.64 (w: +0.4 m/s)	7.64 (w: +0.4 m/s)	q
6	Lin Ching-hsuan	Chinese Taipei	7.37 (w: -0.2 m/s)	7.56 (w: -0.2 m/s)	7.55 (w: +0.5 m/s)	7.56 (w: -0.2 m/s)	q
7	Lourival Neto	Brazil	7.30 (w: +0.3 m/s)	x	7.47 (w: +0.2 m/s)	7.47 (w: +0.2 m/s)	q
8	Dino Pervan	Croatia	7.11 (w: 0.0 m/s)	7.44 (w: -0.7 m/s)	7.17 (w: NWI)	7.44 (w: -0.7 m/s)	
9	Denis Bogdanov	Russia	7.26 (w: +0.2 m/s)	7.35 (w: -0.1 m/s)	7.27 (w: -0.2 m/s)	7.35 (w: -0.1 m/s)	
10	El Mehdi Kabbachi	Morocco	7.13 (w: +0.3 m/s)	7.34 (w: +0.7 m/s)	7.17 (w: -0.3 m/s)	7.34 (w: +0.7 m/s)	
11	Seiji Hiura	Japan	7.33 (w: +0.7 m/s)	7.23 (w: +0.1 m/s)	x	7.33 (w: +0.7 m/s)	
12	Javier McFarlane	Peru	7.31 (w: 0.0 m/s)	7.13 (w: -0.2 m/s)	7.07 (w: +0.2 m/s)	7.31 (w: 0.0 m/s)	
13	Dimítrios Mihalélis	Greece	5.37 (w: -0.3 m/s)	7.22 (w: +0.6 m/s)	7.22 (w: +0.6 m/s)	7.22 (w: +0.6 m/s)	
14	Valentin Toboc	Romania	7.21 (w: 0.0 m/s)	7.18 (w: +0.1 m/s)	7.05 (w: -0.7 m/s)	7.21 (w: 0.0 m/s)	
15	Carlton Lavong	United States	7.14 (w: -0.6 m/s)	x	7.11 (w: +0.6 m/s)	7.14 (w: -0.6 m/s)	
16	Jean-Pierre Bertrand	France	7.13 (w: +0.1 m/s)	7.06 (w: -0.2 m/s)	7.04 (w: +0.3 m/s)	7.13 (w: +0.1 m/s)	
17	Alberto Álvarez	Mexico	6.85 (w: +0.5 m/s)	6.80 (w: -0.1 m/s)	6.80 (w: -0.3 m/s)	6.85 (w: +0.5 m/s)	
18	Wang Zhong	China	x	x	6.34 (w: +0.4 m/s)	6.34 (w: +0.4 m/s)	
	Yannick Roggatz	Germany	x	x	x	NM	

== Participation ==
According to an unofficial count, 37 athletes from 31 countries participated in the event.

- Bahamas (1)
- Belarus (1)
- Brazil (2)
- Canada (1)
- China (2)
- Chinese Taipei (1)
- Croatia (1)
- Cyprus (1)
- France (1)
- Germany (2)
- Greece (1)
- India (1)
- Italy (1)
- Jamaica (1)
- Japan (1)
- Latvia (1)
- Mexico (1)
- Morocco (1)
- Netherlands (1)
- Panama (1)
- Peru (1)
- Poland (1)
- Romania (1)
- Russia (2)
- South Africa (2)
- South Korea (1)
- Spain (1)
- Thailand (1)
- Turkey (1)
- United States (2)
- Zimbabwe (1)
