= 2007 Asian Athletics Championships – Men's long jump =

The men's long jump event at the 2007 Asian Athletics Championships was held in Amman, Jordan on July 26.

== Results ==
Rank	Name	Nationality	Result	Notes
1st place, gold medalist(s)	Mohamed Salman Al-Khuwalidi	Saudi Arabia	8.16w	
2nd place, silver medalist(s)	Saleh Al-haddad	Kuwait	8.05w	
3rd place, bronze medalist(s)	Li Runrun	China	7.84w	
4	Chao Chih-chien	Chinese Taipei	7.82w	
5	Konstantin Safronov	Kazakhstan	7.77	
6	Yohei Sugai	Japan	7.69	
7	Joebert Delicano	Philippines	7.68w	
8	Li Jinzhe	China	7.62w	
9	Daisuke Arakawa	Japan	7.61w	
10	Marc Habib	Lebanon	7.34	
11	Ali Reza Habibigalankashi	Iran	7.33	
12	Zafar Iqbal	Pakistan	7.28w	
13	Mohamed Syahrul Amri Suhaimi	Malaysia	7.25w	
14	Husein Al-Youha	Kuwait	7.18	
	Hussein Taher Al-Sabee	Saudi Arabia	DNS	
	Benigno Marayag	Philippines	DNS	
