= 2005 Asian Athletics Championships – Men's long jump =

The men's long jump event at the 2005 Asian Athletics Championships was held in Incheon, South Korea between 1-2 September 2005.

== Medalists ==
Gold	Silver	Bronze
Ahmed Fayaz Marzouk; Saudi Arabia	Oh Sang-Won; South Korea	Zhou Can; China

== Results ==
=== Qualification ===
Rank	Group	Name	Nationality	Result	Notes
1	A	Ahmed Fayaz Marzouk	Saudi Arabia	8.01	q, SB
2	A	Zhou Can	China	7.92	q
3	B	Oh Sang-Won	South Korea	7.86	q
4	A	Henry Dagmil	Philippines	7.69	q
5	A	Shamsher Singh	India	7.60w	q
6	A	Masaki Morinaga	Japan	7.60	q
7	B	Cai Xiaobao	China	7.59	q
8	B	Shinichi Terano	Japan	7.59	q
9	A	Konstantin Safronov	Kazakhstan	7.56	q
10	A	Ban Gi-Hoon	South Korea	7.56	q
11	B	Saleh Abdelaziz Al-Haddad	Kuwait	7.55	q
12	B	Mahan Singh	India	7.55	q
13	A	Hussein Abdullah Al-Yoha	Kuwait	7.46	
13	B	Waseem Khan	Pakistan	7.46w	
15	A	Kittisak Sukon	Thailand	7.34w	
16	B	Zhandos Akhmetov	Kazakhstan	7.31	
17	B	Shahrul Amri Suhaimi	Malaysia	7.23	
18	B	Therayut Philakong	Thailand	7.17	
19	A	Kenneth Wang Kan	Singapore	7.11	
20	B	Mubarak Al-Jassem	Saudi Arabia	6.61	
21	B	Marc Habib	Lebanon	6.48	
	A	Leong Kin Kuan	Macau	NM	

=== Final ===
Rank	Name	Nationality	Result	Notes
1st place, gold medalist(s)	Ahmed Fayaz Marzouk	Saudi Arabia	7.98	
2nd place, silver medalist(s)	Oh Sang-Won	South Korea	7.87	PB
3rd place, bronze medalist(s)	Zhou Can	China	7.83	
4	Masaki Morinaga	Japan	7.78	
5	Henry Dagmil	Philippines	7.75	
6	Mahan Singh	India	7.64	
7	Shamsher Singh	India	7.61	
8	Saleh Abdelaziz Al-Haddad	Kuwait	7.46	
9	Shinichi Terano	Japan	7.45	
10	Cai Xiaobao	China	7.37	
11	Ban Gi-Hoon	South Korea	7.22	
	Konstantin Safronov	Kazakhstan	NM	
