= Su Xiongfeng =

Chinese long jumper

Medal record

Men's athletics

Representing China

Asian Games
Silver medal – second place	2010 Guangzhou	Long jump

Asian Championships
Gold medal – first place	2011 Kobe	Long jump

Universiade
Gold medal – first place	2011 Shenzhen	Long jump

Su Xiongfeng (Chinese: 苏雄锋, born 21 March 1987) is a Chinese track and field athlete who competes in the long jump. He became the Asian champion at the 2011 Asian Championships and was the silver medallist at the 2010 Asian Games. His personal best jump of 8.27 metres is the Asian indoor record.

Born in Shunde District, Guangdong, Su became interested in the long jump around 2002 and took part in high school and university competitions. While attending Huazhong University of Science and Technology, he won the 2007 national universities title. At the 2007 Chinese City Games (China's top junior-level event), he saw off both Zhang Xiaoyi and Li Jinzhe to claim the title with his first ever jump over eight metres (8.07 m).

In 2008, he improved his best by a centimetre, recording a jump of 8.08 m at both the Chinese Olympic Trials (where he was runner-up) and the Shanghai Golden Grand Prix (where he was China's sole medallist). Due to the scheduling of the 2008 Summer Olympics in Beijing, that year's Chinese Athletics Championships were held late in October and Su won his first national long jump title in the absence of more experienced rivals. He competed at the 2009 Summer Universiade for Huazhong University and came fourth behind Marcin Starzak of Poland. He represented his province for the first time at the 2009 National Games of China and although he had his best jump of the season there (8.05 m), it was again only enough for fourth place.

The 2010 indoor season saw Su establish himself as one of Asia's best jumpers as he cleared 8.27 m in Nanjing in March, breaking both Huang Geng's 14-year-old Chinese indoor record and Mohamed Salman Al-Khuwalidi's Asian indoor record. This remained the best performance indoors that year and ranked him joint seventh in the world for 2010. Su set an outdoor best of 8.11 m to win at the Osaka Grand Prix. He improved upon this with a jump of 8.17 m at the Chinese Championships to defeat Li Jinzhe and won his second national title. As a result, he was selected to represent China at the 2010 Asian Games in his home province of Guangdong. Korea's Kim Deok-Hyeon won the competition, but Su took his first major medal with his jump of 8.05 m for the silver.

Su won the national indoor championships at the start of 2011 and went on to record an outdoor best of 8.19 m to secure second place behind Mitchell Watt at the Diamond League meeting in Shanghai. He entered the 2011 Asian Athletics Championships as the regional rankings leader and equalled his year's best jump to win the Asian title ahead of Supanara Sukhasvasti.
