= Gao Xinglong =

Chinese long jumper (born 1994)

Medal record

Men's athletics

Representing China

Asian Games
Bronze medal – third place	2014 Incehon	Long jump

Asian Athletics Championships
Gold medal – first place	2015 Wuhan	Long jump

Gao Xinglong (born 12 March 1994) is a Chinese male track and field athlete who competes in the long jump. He has a personal best of 8.18 m (26 ft 10 in) and is the 2015 Asian champion for the event.

Born in Heilongjiang, Gao began to establish himself at elite level with a jump of 8.08 m (26 ft 6 in) indoors in Nanjing in March 2013. Outdoors, he won at the inaugural Friendship Meeting international between China, Japan and Korea.

He began 2014 as he had the previous year, setting a personal best indoors in Nanjing with a jump of 8.03 m (26 ft 4 in). He improved further outdoors, clearing 8.18 m (26 ft 10 in) at a national level meeting in Jinhua – a mark which ranked him in the top 15 globally for the season and Asia's second best man after compatriot Li Jinzhe. In his first major competition he won a bronze medal at the 2014 Asian Games, beaten by Li and Korean Kim Deok-hyeon. He ended the season with his first national title win at the Chinese Athletics Championships.

Gao continued to improve into the 2015 season. He had a best mark of 8.12 m (26 ft 7 1/2 in) at the Birmingham Indoor Grand Prix, beaten only by Britain's Olympic champion Greg Rutherford. His first continental title followed at the 2015 Asian Athletics Championships, where he jumped under eight metres but still saw off all competition on home turf in Wuhan.

== International competitions ==
Year	Competition	Venue	Position	Notes
2014	Asian Games	Incheon, South Korea	3rd	7.86 m
2015	Asian Championships	Wuhan, China	1st	7.96 m
2015	World Championships	Beijing, China	4th	8.14 m
2016	Olympic Games	Rio de Janeiro, Brazil	–	NM
2019	Universiade	Naples, Italy	9th	7.74 m
2021	Olympic Games	Tokyo, Japan	17th (q)	7.86 m
