= 2000 Asian Athletics Championships – Men's long jump =

The men's long jump event at the 2000 Asian Athletics Championships was held in Jakarta, Indonesia on 31 August.

== Results ==
| Rank | Name | Nationality | #1 | #2 | #3 | #4 | #5 | #6 | Result | Notes |
|---|---|---|---|---|---|---|---|---|---|---|
| 1st place, gold medalist(s) | Hussein Al-Sabee | Saudi Arabia | x | 8.33 | 8.02 | 5.77 | 7.97 | 8.30 | 8.33 | CR, NR |
| 2nd place, silver medalist(s) | Sanjay Kumar Rai | India | 6.92 | 7.78 | 7.74 | 7.81 | 8.03 | 7.78 | 8.03 | PB |
| 3rd place, bronze medalist(s) | Abdulrahman Al-Nubi | Qatar | 8.01 | 7.94 | 7.47 | 7.24 | x | 6.08 | 8.01 | |
| 4 | Wang Cheng | China | | | | | | | 7.91 | |
| 5 | Nattaporn Nomkanha | Thailand | | | | | | | 7.74 | |
| 6 | Hsu Chih-Hsiung | Chinese Taipei | | | | | | | 7.74 | |
| 7 | Sujith Rohitha | Sri Lanka | | | | | | | 7.71 | |
| 8 | Shigeru Tagawa | Japan | | | | | | | 7.62 | |
| 9 | Maksim Smetanin | Kyrgyzstan | | | | | | | 7.49 | |
| 10 | Al-Waleed Abdulla | Qatar | | | | | | | 7.41 | |
| 11 | Hussein Abdullah Al-Yoha | Kuwait | | | | | | | 7.31 | |
| 12 | Sung Hee-Joon | South Korea | | | | | | | 7.29 | |
| 13 | Windarji | Indonesia | | | | | | | 7.20 | |
| 14 | Wisnu Nugroho | Indonesia | | | | | | | 7.03 | |
| 15 | Lee Chi Wai | Hong Kong | | | | | | | 6.94 | |
| 16 | Nguyen Mai Linh | Vietnam | | | | | | | 6.75 | |
