= Track and field at the 2011 Military World Games – Men's long jump =

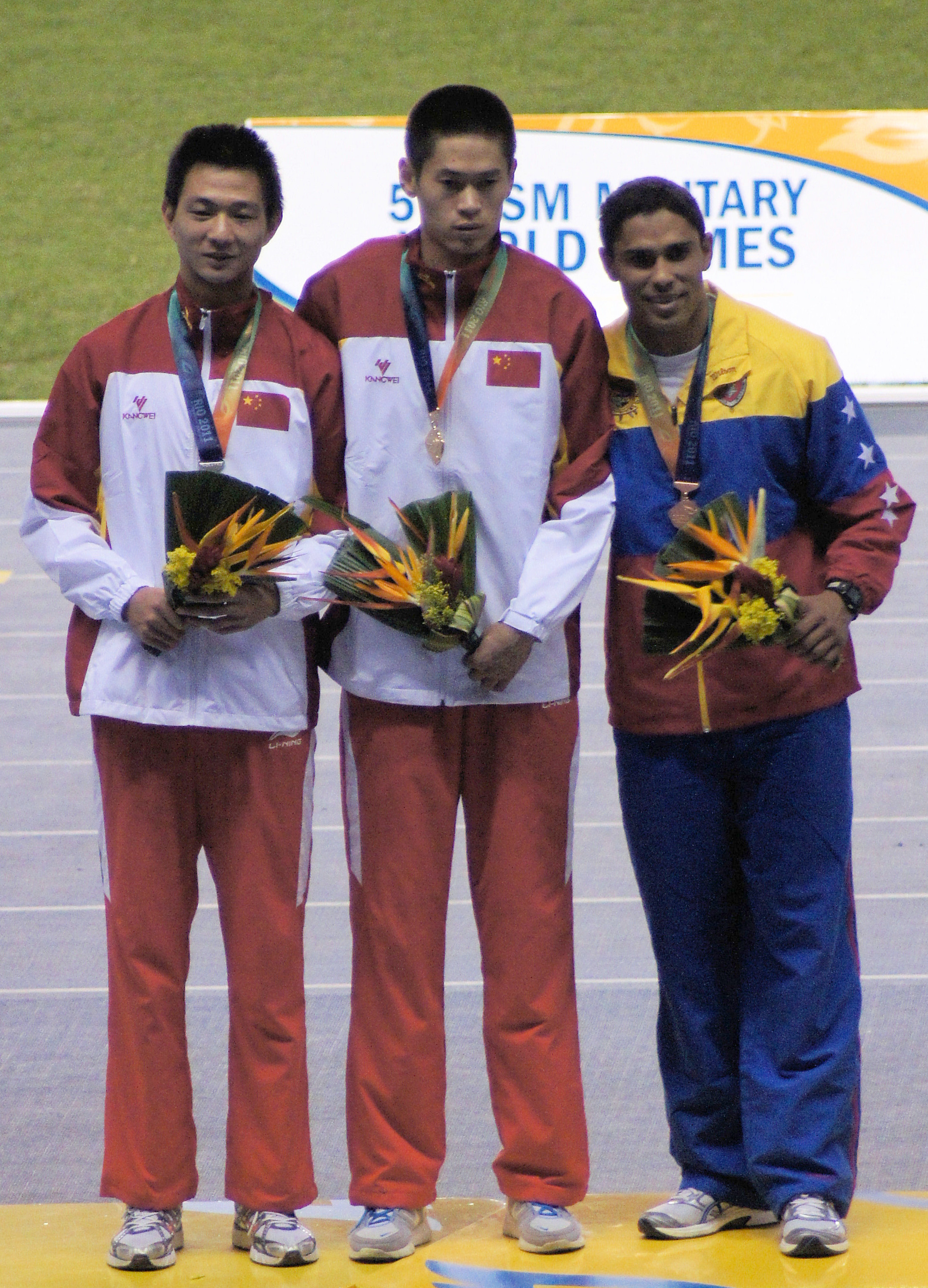
Left-right: Zhang Xiaoyi, Yu Zhenwei and Víctor Castillo

The men's long jump event at the 2011 Military World Games was held on 20 and 22 July at the Estádio Olímpico João Havelange.

== Records ==
Prior to this competition, the existing world and CISM record were as follows:

World Record	Mike Powell (USA)	8.95	Tokyo, Japan	30 August 1991
CISM World Record	Stanislav Tarasenko (RUS)	8.24		1993

== Schedule ==
Date	Time	Round
20 July 2011	10:00	Qualification
22 July 2011	16:20	Final

== Medalists ==
Gold	Silver	Bronze
Yu Zhenwei; China	Zhang Xiaoyi; China	Víctor Castillo; Venezuela

== Results ==
=== Final ===
Rank	Athlete	Nationality	#1	#2	#3	#4	#5	#6	Mark	Notes
1st place, gold medalist(s)	Yu Zhenwei	China	x	7.86 (-0.1 m/s)	x	8.05 (+1.3 m/s)	x	8.02 (+0.2 m/s)	8.05 (+1.3 m/s)	
2nd place, silver medalist(s)	Zhang Xiaoyi	China	x	7.68 (-1.2 m/s)	7.63 (-0.2 m/s)	x	7.90 (+0.6 m/s)	7.76 (+1.3 m/s)	7.90 (+0.6 m/s)	
3rd place, bronze medalist(s)	Víctor Castillo	Venezuela	7.37 (-0.2 m/s)	7.39 (-0.1 m/s)	7.55 (+1.7 m/s)	7.45 (-0.2 m/s)	7.81 (+1.3 m/s)	x	7.81 (+1.3 m/s)	
4	Kim Sang-su	South Korea	x	7.63 (-0.5 m/s)	7.48 (+0.9 m/s)	7.49 (-0.1 m/s)	x	7.76 (+1.2 m/s)	7.76 (+1.2 m/s)	
5	Hussain Al-Saba	Saudi Arabia	7.66 (+0.8 m/s)	x	7.72 (0.0 m/s)	–	–	4.64 (+0.4 m/s)	7.72 (0.0 m/s)	
6	Andriy Makarchev	Ukraine	x	7.66 (+0.2 m/s)	7.70 (-0.2 m/s)	x	x	x	7.70 (-0.2 m/s)	
7	Rogério Bispo	Brazil	x	7.56 (+0.5 m/s)	7.46 (-0.6 m/s)	7.57 (-0.9 m/s)	x	7.52 (+1.3 m/s)	7.57 (-0.9 m/s)	
8	Nicolas Gomont	France	7.37 (+1.2 m/s)	7.50 (-0.7 m/s)	7.42 (-0.4 m/s)	7.34 (-0.6 m/s)	x	7.57 (+1.0 m/s)	7.57 (+1.0 m/s)	
9	Julien Fivaz	Switzerland	7.43 (+1.2 m/s)	7.44 (+0.8 m/s)	7.37 (-0.6 m/s)				7.44 (+0.8 m/s)	
10	Stefano Dacastello	Italy	x	7.35 (+1.8 m/s)	7.11 (-0.3 m/s)				7.35 (+1.8 m/s)	
11	Dmytro TYDEN	Ukraine	7.21 (+0.3 m/s)	x	7.28 (+0.1 m/s)				7.28 (+0.1 m/s)	
12	Issam Nima	Algeria	7.27 (+0.5 m/s)	7.13 (-0.7 m/s)	–				7.27 (+0.5 m/s)	
