= Huang Le =

Huang Le may refer to:

- Alice Huang (executive) (born Huang Le; 1977), Chinese technology executive
- Huang Le (long jumper) (born 1977), Chinese long jumper
