= Athletics at the 2003 Summer Universiade – Men's long jump =

The men's long jump event at the 2003 Summer Universiade was held on 27–28 August in Daegu, South Korea.

== Medalists ==
Gold	Silver	Bronze
Valeriy Vasylyev; Ukraine	Dănuț Simion; Romania	Andrey Bragin; Russia

== Results ==
=== Qualification ===
Rank	Group	Athlete	Nationality	#1	#2	#3	Result	Notes
1	A	Dănuț Simion	Romania				7.90	Q
2	A	Andrey Bragin	Russia				7.75	Q
3	A	Kafétien Gomis	France				7.67	Q
4	A	Tomasz Mateusiak	Poland				7.66	Q
5	A	Daisuke Arakawa	Japan				7.62	Q
6	B	Valeriy Vasylyev	Ukraine				7.59	Q
7	A	Leandro de Jesus	Brazil				7.58	Q
7	B	Ivan Pucelj	Croatia				7.58	Q
9	A	Huang Le	China				7.57	Q
10	A	Oleksandr Patselya	Ukraine				7.57	Q
11	A	Antonio Adsuar	Spain				7.56	Q
11	B	Ndiss Kaba Badji	Senegal				7.56	Q
13	A	Ilja Tumorin	Estonia				7.54	
14	A	Marijo Baković	Croatia				7.54	
15	B	Tamás Margl	Hungary				7.51	
16	A	Jan Žumer	Slovenia				7.44	
17	A	Craig Cavanagh	Canada				7.42	
17	B	Craig Cavanagh	Canada				7.42	
19	A	Arvydas Nazarovas	Lithuania	7.17	x	7.40	7.40	
19	B	Boštjan Fridrih	Slovenia				7.40	
21	A	Mesut Yavaş	Turkey				7.39	
22	A	Imre Lőrincz	Hungary				7.39	
23	A	Martin McClintock	South Africa				7.36	
24	A	Peter Parsons	Australia				7.35	
25	A	Povilas Mykolaitis	Lithuania	7.13	x	7.34	7.34	
26	?	Ruslan Gataullin	Russia				7.32	
27	?	Thiago Jacinto Dias	Brazil				7.32	
28	?	Artūrs Āboliņš	Latvia				7.18	
29	?	Georgios Togas	Greece				7.13	
29	?	Shon Il-shik	South Korea				7.13	
31	?	El Mehdi Saadi	Morocco				6.98	
32	?	Nader Salem Rached Ali	United Arab Emirates				6.76	
33	?	Abdullah Taher Hassan	United Arab Emirates				6.67	
34	?	Desama Ayelo	Togo				6.63	
35	?	Ferhat Çiçek	Turkey				6.55	
36	?	Lam Cheng Fu	Macau				6.49	
37	?	Alnobi Al-Kiyumi	Oman				5.62	

=== Final ===
Rank	Athlete	Nationality	#1	#2	#3	#4	#5	#6	Result	Notes
1st place, gold medalist(s)	Valeriy Vasylyev	Ukraine	7.85	x	x	8.07	7.75	x	8.07	
2nd place, silver medalist(s)	Dănuț Simion	Romania	7.96	x	x	x	x	8.04	8.04	
3rd place, bronze medalist(s)	Andrey Bragin	Russia	7.71	7.79	8.04	x	x	7.71	8.04	
4	Tomasz Mateusiak	Poland	7.87	7.86	7.69	x	x	7.55	7.87	
5	Ndiss Kaba Badji	Senegal	7.37	7.83	7.80	7.55	7.61	7.61	7.83	
6	Antonio Adsuar	Spain	7.69	7.80	7.56	7.55	7.52	x	7.80	
7	Huang Le	China	7.77	7.63	7.76	7.58	x	7.78	7.78	
8	Ivan Pucelj	Croatia	7.68	x	7.77	7.52	7.38	7.62	7.77	
9	Kafétien Gomis	France	7.45	7.55	7.74				7.74	
10	Leandro de Jesus	Brazil	7.56	7.68	7.60				7.68	
11	Oleksandr Patselya	Ukraine	7.56	x	7.61				7.61	
12	Daisuke Arakawa	Japan	7.41	7.53	7.58				7.58	
