= Ted Hooper (athlete) =

Personal information
- Born: 31 January 1991 (age 35) Arcadia, California, United States
- Education: University of California, Riverside

Sport
- Sport: Track and field
- Event: Long jump

Ted Hooper (born 31 January 1991) is an American-born Taiwanese athlete specialising in the long jump. He represented Chinese Taipei at the 2016 World Indoor Championships without recording a valid mark. He also won the silver medal at the 2015 Asian Championships.

His personal bests in the event are 8.08 metres outdoors (+0.1 m/s, Irvine 2015) and 7.83 metres indoors (Seattle 2016).

He was a qualifier to the 2009 CIF California State Meet, representing Arcadia High School, where he holds the school record, but had trouble making a legal jump in the qualifying round.

== Competition record ==
Year	Competition	Venue	Position	Event	Notes
Representing Chinese Taipei
2015	Asian Championships	Wuhan, China	2nd	Long jump	7.80 m
2015	Universiade	Gwangju, South Korea	5th	Long jump	7.83 m
2016	World Indoor Championships	Portland, United States	–	Long jump	NM
