= 2006 World Junior Championships in Athletics – Men's long jump =

The men's long jump event at the 2006 World Junior Championships in Athletics was held in Beijing, China, at Chaoyang Sports Centre on 15 and 16 August.

== Medalists ==
Gold	Robert Crowther; Australia
Silver	Antone Belt; United States
Bronze	Zhang Xiaoyi; China

== Results ==
=== Final ===
16 August

Rank	Name	Nationality	Attempts						Result	Notes
Rank	Name	Nationality	1	2	3	4	5	6	Result	Notes
1st place, gold medalist(s)	Robert Crowther	Australia	x	7.65 (w: +0.1 m/s)	x	7.78 (w: +0.2 m/s)	8.00 (w: +0.3 m/s)	-	8.00 (w: +0.3 m/s)	
2nd place, silver medalist(s)	Antone Belt	United States	7.40 (w: +0.3 m/s)	7.71 (w: +0.2 m/s)	7.79 (w: -0.4 m/s)	7.77 (w: +0.4 m/s)	7.95 (w: 0.0 m/s)	x	7.95 (w: 0.0 m/s)	
3rd place, bronze medalist(s)	Zhang Xiaoyi	China	7.84 (w: +0.5 m/s)	7.78 (w: +0.7 m/s)	-	7.86 (w: +0.3 m/s)	7.75 (w: +0.2 m/s)	x	7.86 (w: +0.3 m/s)	
4	Mohammad Arzandeh	Iran	7.63 (w: +0.9 m/s)	7.46 (w: 0.0 m/s)	7.47 (w: +0.3 m/s)	7.67 (w: +0.4 m/s)	7.51 (w: +0.3 m/s)	7.58 (w: +0.7 m/s)	7.67 (w: +0.4 m/s)	
5	Aaron Smith	United States	7.19 (w: +0.3 m/s)	7.61 (w: +0.5 m/s)	7.43 (w: +0.1 m/s)	x	7.34 (w: +0.6 m/s)	7.47 (w: +0.7 m/s)	7.61 (w: +0.5 m/s)	
6	Keenan Watson	South Africa	7.55 (w: +0.3 m/s)	7.27 (w: +0.2 m/s)	x	7.00 (w: 0.0 m/s)	7.23 (w: +0.2 m/s)	7.24 (w: +0.6 m/s)	7.55 (w: +0.3 m/s)	
7	Hugo Chila	Ecuador	x	7.45 (w: +0.3 m/s)	7.51 (w: 0.0 m/s)	x	x	x	7.51 (w: 0.0 m/s)	
8	Anton Filatenkov	Russia	x	x	7.48 (w: +0.2 m/s)	7.15 (w: -0.2 m/s)	x	x	7.48 (w: +0.2 m/s)	
9	Benoît Maxwell	France	x	7.38 (w: +0.3 m/s)	7.46 (w: 0.0 m/s)				7.46 (w: 0.0 m/s)	
10	Tiberiu Talnar	Romania	x	x	7.43 (w: -0.3 m/s)				7.43 (w: -0.3 m/s)	
11	Rudon Bastian	Bahamas	7.34 (w: +0.5 m/s)	x	x				7.34 (w: +0.5 m/s)	
12	Ngonidzashe Makusha	Zimbabwe	x	7.33 (w: +0.2 m/s)	6.86 (w: 0.0 m/s)				7.33 (w: +0.2 m/s)	

=== Qualifications ===
15 August

==== Group A ====
Rank	Name	Nationality	Attempts			Result	Notes
Rank	Name	Nationality	1	2	3	Result	Notes
1	Antone Belt	United States	x	7.46 (w: -0.9 m/s)	7.73 (w: -0.2 m/s)	7.73 (w: -0.2 m/s)	Q
2	Hugo Chila	Ecuador	x	7.38 (w: +0.2 m/s)	7.63 (w: -0.1 m/s)	7.63 (w: -0.1 m/s)	Q
3	Robert Crowther	Australia	7.61 (w: -1.0 m/s)	-	-	7.61 (w: -1.0 m/s)	Q
4	Rudon Bastian	Bahamas	7.58 (w: +0.2 m/s)	x	x	7.58 (w: +0.2 m/s)	q
5	Keenan Watson	South Africa	7.53 (w: +0.2 m/s)	7.37 (w: -1.6 m/s)	7.50 (w: -0.2 m/s)	7.53 (w: +0.2 m/s)	q
6	Mohammad Arzandeh	Iran	7.51 (w: +0.4 m/s)	x	7.38 (w: -0.4 m/s)	7.51 (w: +0.4 m/s)	q
7	Mihaíl Mertzanídis-Despotéris	Greece	7.42 (w: -0.4 m/s)	x	7.35 (w: -0.2 m/s)	7.42 (w: -0.4 m/s)	
8	Konstantin Safronov	Kazakhstan	7.35 (w: -0.3 m/s)	x	6.97 (w: -0.6 m/s)	7.35 (w: -0.3 m/s)	
9	Emmanuel Biron	France	7.35 (w: -0.4 m/s)	x	x	7.35 (w: -0.4 m/s)	
10	Zhang Youzhi	China	7.24 (w: +0.2 m/s)	6.34 (w: -0.4 m/s)	6.17 (w: -1.1 m/s)	7.24 (w: +0.2 m/s)	
11	Teodoro Nonato	Philippines	6.95 (w: -0.2 m/s)	6.93 (w: +0.1 m/s)	x	6.95 (w: -0.2 m/s)	
12	Dmitrii Ilin	Kyrgyzstan	6.49 (w: 0.0 m/s)	6.58 (w: -0.7 m/s)	6.82 (w: +0.1 m/s)	6.82 (w: +0.1 m/s)	

==== Group B ====
Rank	Name	Nationality	Attempts			Result	Notes
Rank	Name	Nationality	1	2	3	Result	Notes
1	Zhang Xiaoyi	China	7.83 (w: 0.0 m/s)	-	-	7.83 (w: 0.0 m/s)	Q
2	Anton Filatenkov	Russia	7.68 (w: 0.0 m/s)	-	-	7.68 (w: 0.0 m/s)	Q
3	Aaron Smith	United States	7.61 (w: -0.6 m/s)	-	-	7.61 (w: -0.6 m/s)	Q
4	Ngonidzashe Makusha	Zimbabwe	7.06 (w: -0.7 m/s)	7.54 (w: -1.0 m/s)	7.12 (w: -1.6 m/s)	7.54 (w: -1.0 m/s)	q
5	Tiberiu Talnar	Romania	7.41 (w: +0.2 m/s)	7.44 (w: 0.0 m/s)	7.48 (w: -0.5 m/s)	7.48 (w: -0.5 m/s)	q
6	Benoît Maxwell	France	7.47 (w: -1.2 m/s)	7.45 (w: -0.7 m/s)	x	7.47 (w: -1.2 m/s)	q
7	Roger Carulla	Spain	7.16 (w: -0.6 m/s)	7.41 (w: -0.8 m/s)	7.29 (w: -0.1 m/s)	7.41 (w: -0.8 m/s)	
8	Chris Noffke	Australia	7.41 (w: -1.3 m/s)	x	x	7.41 (w: -1.3 m/s)	
9	Ahmed Al-Sharfa	Saudi Arabia	6.85 (w: +0.1 m/s)	7.29 (w: +0.2 m/s)	7.09 (w: -0.6 m/s)	7.29 (w: +0.2 m/s)	
10	Noriyoki Sakurai	Japan	7.25 (w: -0.4 m/s)	7.13 (w: -0.8 m/s)	7.28 (w: -0.7 m/s)	7.28 (w: -0.7 m/s)	
11	Alafans Delfino	Brazil	7.22 (w: +0.2 m/s)	7.18 (w: -0.6 m/s)	7.10 (w: -0.9 m/s)	7.22 (w: +0.2 m/s)	
12	Simpson Penn	Turks and Caicos Islands	6.12 (w: +0.2 m/s)	6.53 (w: -1.4 m/s)	6.22 (w: -0.4 m/s)	6.53 (w: -1.4 m/s)	

== Participation ==
According to an unofficial count, 24 athletes from 20 countries participated in the event.

- Australia (2)
- Bahamas (1)
- Brazil (1)
- China (2)
- Ecuador (1)
- France (2)
- Greece (1)
- Iran (1)
- Japan (1)
- Kazakhstan (1)
- Kyrgyzstan (1)
- Philippines (1)
- Romania (1)
- Russia (1)
- Saudi Arabia (1)
- South Africa (1)
- Spain (1)
- Turks and Caicos Islands (1)
- United States (2)
- Zimbabwe (1)
