= Athletics at the 2015 Summer Universiade – Men's long jump =

Long jump contest in South Korea in 2015

The men's long jump event at the 2015 Summer Universiade was held on 11 and 12 July at the Gwangju Universiade Main Stadium.

== Medalists ==
Gold	Silver	Bronze
Pavel Shalin; Russia	Vasiliy Kopeykin; Russia	Rudolph Pienaar; South Africa

== Results ==
=== Qualification ===
Qualification: 7.85 m (Q) or at least 12 best (q) qualified for the final.

Rank	Group	Athlete	Nationality	#1	#2	#3	Result	Notes
1	B	Ted Hooper	Chinese Taipei	7.90			7.90	Q
2	B	Chan Ming Tai	Hong Kong	7.61	x	7.79	7.79	q, NR
3	A	Vasiliy Kopeykin	Russia	7.64	x	7.72	7.72	q
4	B	Pavel Shalin	Russia	7.54	7.72	x	7.72	q
5	B	Adam McMullen	Ireland	x	7.65	7.70	7.70	q
6	A	Bruno da Costa	Portugal	7.36	7.67	–	7.67	q, PB
7	B	Rudolph Pienaar	South Africa	7.67	7.41	7.48	7.67	q
8	A	Cedric Nolf	Belgium	7.66	7.35	x	7.66	q
9	A	Lin Hung-min	Chinese Taipei	x	7.63	7.51	7.63	q
10	B	Joo Eun-jae	South Korea	7.28	7.63	7.25	7.63	q, SB
11	A	Yasuhiro Moro	Japan	7.31	x	7.56	7.56	q
12	B	Henrik Kutberg	Estonia	7.47	7.34	7.50	7.50	q
13	B	Tomoya Takamasa	Japan	7.39	–	–	7.39	
14	A	Aubrey Smith	Canada	7.18	x	7.36	7.36	
15	A	Valentin Toboc	Romania	x	x	7.33	7.33	
16	A	Alper Kulaksiz	Turkey	7.32	x	x	7.32	
17	B	Matthew Wyatt	New Zealand	7.27	7.31	7.19	7.31	
18	A	Ionut Grecu	Romania	7.25	7.01	7.29	7.29	
19	A	Marcel Mayack II	Cameroon	7.00	6.90	7.28	7.28	SB
20	A	Danushka Galolu	Sri Lanka	6.98	7.27	7.09	7.27	
21	A	Bram Ruissen	Netherlands	7.07	7.25	x	7.25	
22	B	Konstantin Safronov	Kazakhstan	x	x	7.24	7.24	
23	B	Fred Dorsey III	United States Virgin Islands	7.06	6.88	6.72	7.06	
24	A	Nicholas Van Gelder	Australia	6.48	6.83	7.06	7.06	
25	B	Adrian Rivera	Mexico	7.00	7.01	x	7.01	
26	B	Angus Gould	Australia	x	6.99	x	6.94	
27	B	Idrees Dubar-Bernard	United States	6.72	6.94	6.47	6.94	PB
28	A	Igor Syunin	Estonia	x	x	6.74	6.74	
29	A	Ian Paul Grech	Malta	x	6.73	–	6.73	
30	B	Hugues Zango	Burkina Faso	6.73	–	–	6.73	
31	B	Roy Martínez	Venezuela	x	x	6.66	6.66	
32	A	Carlos Burlando	Venezuela	x	6.03	6.60	6.60	
33	A	Ahmad Younis	Jordan	x	6.23	6.46	6.46	
34	A	Elvijs Misāns	Latvia	x	x	5.41	5.41	
	B	Mehakpreet Singh	India	x	x	x	NM	
	B	Sylvester Nakeel	Kenya	x	x	x	NM	

=== Final ===
Official Video

Rank	Athlete	Nationality	#1	#2	#3	#4	#5	#6	Result	Notes
1st place, gold medalist(s)	Pavel Shalin	Russia	7.75	7.95	8.29w	7.76	7.79	x	8.29w	
2nd place, silver medalist(s)	Vasiliy Kopeykin	Russia	7.53	7.56	7.74	8.13	7.84	x	8.13w	
3rd place, bronze medalist(s)	Rudolph Pienaar	South Africa	7.61	7.98w	7.67	7.51	7.77	x	7.98w	
4	Chan Ming Tai	Hong Kong	7.03	7.89	x	7.25	7.74	x	7.89	NR
5	Ted Hooper	Chinese Taipei	x	x	7.70w	x	x	7.83	7.83	
6	Cedric Nolf	Belgium	x	7.83w	7.55	7.16	x	7.66w	7.83w	
7	Yasuhiro Moro	Japan	7.77	7.25	7.66	7.75w	x	7.53	7.77	SB
8	Lin Hung-Min	Chinese Taipei	7.72	x	x	7.30	7.71	x	7.72	
9	Joo Eun-jae	South Korea	7.41	7.45	7.68w				7.68w	
10	Adam McMullen	Ireland	7.42	7.61	x				7.61	
11	Bruno da Costa	Portugal	7.53w	x	x				7.53w	
12	Henrik Kutberg	Estonia	7.31	7.28	x				7.31	
