= Pavel Shalin =

Russian long jumper (born 1987)

Personal information
- Born: 15 April 1987 (age 38) Lipetsk, Soviet Union
- Education: Smolensk State Academy of Physical Culture, Sport and Tourism
- Height: 1.75 m (5 ft 9 in)
- Weight: 73 kg (161 lb)

Sport
- Sport: Track and field
- Event: Long jump

Pavel Andreyevich Shalin (Cyrillic: Павел Андреевич Шалин; born 15 April 1987 in Lipetsk) is a Russian athlete specialising in the long jump. He won the gold medal at the 2015 Summer Universiade.

His personal bests in the event are 8.25 metres outdoor (Moscow 2010) and 8.08 metres indoor (Moscow 2014). In addition, his triple jump outdoor personal best is 16.56 metres set in Kaunas in 2009.

== Competition record ==
Year	Competition	Venue	Position	Event	Notes
Representing Russia
2009	European U23 Championships	Kaunas, Lithuania	5th (q)	Triple jump	16.56 m
2010	European Championships	Barcelona, Spain	14th (q)	Long jump	7.94 m
2012	European Championships	Helsinki, Finland	15th (q)	Long jump	7.81 m
2015	European Indoor Championships	Prague, Czech Republic	6th	Long jump	7.80 m
2015	Universiade	Gwangju, South Korea	1st	Long jump	8.29 m (w)
2015	Military World Games	Mungyeong, South Korea	1st	Long jump	7.66 m
