= Yohei Sugai =

Japanese long jumper

Personal information
- Born: 30 August 1985 (age 40) Ashikaga, Tochigi, Japan
- Education: Juntendo University
- Height: 180 cm (5 ft 11 in)
- Weight: 77 kg (170 lb)

Sport
- Country: Japan
- Sport: Track and field
- Event: Long jump
- Retired: 2017

Achievements and titles
- Personal best: 8.18 m (Walnut 2015)
- Updated on 17 October 2020

Yohei Sugai (Japanese: 菅井 洋平, Hepburn: Sugai Yōhei; born 30 August 1985) is a retired Japanese long jumper. He competed at the 2015 World Championships in Beijing without qualifying for the final.

His personal best in the event is 8.18 metres (+1.3 m/s) set in Walnut in 2015.

== Personal bests ==
Event	Measure (m)	Wind (m/s)	Competition	Venue	Date	Notes
Outdoor
Long jump	8.18	+1.3	Mt. SAC Relays	Walnut, United States	18 April 2015	
Indoor
Long jump	7.70	n/a	Asian Indoor Championships	Doha, Qatar	16 February 2008	
Long jump	7.70	n/a	Japanese Junior Indoor Meet	Osaka, Japan	9 February 2014	

== Competition record ==
Year	Competition	Venue	Position	Event	Notes
Representing Japan
2007	Asian Championships	Amman, Jordan	6th	Long jump	7.69 m
2008	Asian Indoor Championships	Doha, Qatar	4th	Long jump	7.70 m
2009	Asian Championships	Guangzhou, China	6th	Long jump	7.78 m
2010	Asian Games	Guangzhou, China	4th	Long jump	7.63 m
2011	Asian Championships	Kobe, Japan	4th	Long jump	8.03 m
2012	Asian Indoor Championships	Hangzhou, China	7th	Long jump	7.54 m
2015	Asian Championships	Wuhan, China	6th	Long jump	7.67 m
2015	World Championships	Beijing, China	16th (q)	Long jump	7.92 m
2016	World Indoor Championships	Portland, United States	12th	Long jump	7.35 m

== National titles ==
- Japanese Championships
  - Long jump: 2008, 2010, 2011, 2015
