= Aubrey Smith (long jumper) =

Jamaican track and field athlete

Personal information
- Born: 30 June 1988 (age 38) Kingston, Jamaica
- Education: Florida International University
- Height: 1.80 m (5 ft 11 in)
- Weight: 75.75 kg (167.0 lb)

Sport
- Sport: Athletics
- Event: Long jump

Achievements and titles
- Highest world ranking: 6
- Personal best(s): 8.16 m (26 ft 9 1/4 in) long jump

Aubrey Smith, born 30 June 1988, in Kingston, Jamaica is a track and field athlete, specialising in the long jump. He represented Canada at the 2015 Summer Universiade and Jamaica at the 2016 Summer Olympics.

Smith graduated at Florida International University, in Miami, Florida, US. He also won the silver medal, in the long jump, at the 2014 Conference USA Outdoor Track & Field Championships, while representing FIU. It was there he attained the school record, on his opening jump, of 7.80m (25 feet 7 ¼ inches).

== Competition record ==
Year	Competition	Venue	Position	Event	Notes
Representing Canada
2015	Universiade	Gwangju, South Korea	14th (q)	Long jump	7.36 m
Representing Jamaica
2016	Olympic Games	Rio de Janeiro, Brazil	–	Long jump	NM
