= Zhou Can =

Chinese long jumper (born 1979)

Medal record

Men's athletics

Representing China

Asian Championships
Silver medal – second place	2003 Manila	Long jump
Bronze medal – third place	2005 Incheon	Long jump

Zhou Can (born 20 May 1979) is a Chinese long jumper. His personal best jump is 8.22 metres, achieved in June 2007 in Suzhou.

He won the silver medal at the 2003 Asian Championships and the bronze medal at the 2005 Asian Championships. He also competed at the 2004 World Indoor Championships, the 2004 Olympic Games and the 2008 Olympic Games without reaching the final round.

== Achievements ==
Year	Competition	Venue	Position	Event	Notes
Representing China
1998	World Junior Championships	Annecy, France	18th (q)	Long jump	7.39 m (wind: +1.9 m/s)
1998	World Junior Championships	Annecy, France	25th (q)	Triple jump	15.24 m (wind: -0.1 m/s)
2003	Asian Championships	Manila, Philippines	2nd	Long jump	8.11 m
2003	Afro-Asian Games	Hyderabad, India	4th	Long jump	7.49 m
2004	World Indoor Championships	Budapest, Hungary	12th (q)	Long jump	7.87 m
2004	Olympic Games	Athens, Greece	34th (q)	Long jump	7.47 m
2005	Asian Championships	Incheon, South Korea	3rd	Long jump	7.83 m
2008	Olympic Games	Beijing, China	–	Long jump	DNF
