= Rikiya Saruyama =

Japanese long jumper (born 1984)

Personal information
- Nationality: Japanese
- Born: 15 February 1984 (age 42) Nagareyama, Japan
- Education: Nihon University
- Height: 1.75 m (5 ft 9 in)
- Weight: 68 kg (150 lb)

Sport
- Country: Japan
- Sport: Track and field
- Event: Long jump

Achievements and titles
- Personal best(s): 8.05 m (Walnut, Kobe 2011)
Medal record
Men's athletics
Representing Japan
Asian Championships
Bronze medal – third place	2011 Kobe	Long jump
Asian Indoor Championships
Gold medal – first place	2010 Tehran	Long jump
Silver medal – second place	2012 Hangzhou	Long jump
East Asian Games
Bronze medal – third place	2009 Hong Kong	Long jump

Rikiya Saruyama (猿山 力也, Saruyama Rikiya; born 15 February 1984 in Nagareyama) is a Japanese long jumper.

== Personal bests ==
Event	Measure	Wind	Competition	Venue	Date
Long jump	8.05 m	+0.9 m/s	Mt. SAC Relays	Walnut, United States	16 April 2011
Long jump	8.05 m	+1.2 m/s	Asian Championships	Kobe, Japan	10 July 2011

== International competition ==
Year	Competition	Venue	Position	Event	Measure	Notes
Representing Japan
2009	East Asian Games	Hong Kong, China	3rd	Long jump	7.71 m (wind: -0.1 m/s)	
2010	Asian Indoor Championships	Tehran, Iran	1st	Long jump	7.65 m	
2011	Asian Championships	Kobe, Japan	3rd	Long jump	8.05 m (wind: +1.2 m/s)	=PB
2012	Asian Indoor Championships	Hangzhou, China	2nd	Long jump	7.63 m	
