= Shinichi Terano =

Japanese long jumper

Personal information
- Born: 10 July 1979 (age 47) Osaka Prefecture, Japan
- Education: Nihon University
- Height: 176 cm (5 ft 9 in)
- Weight: 68 kg (150 lb)

Sport
- Country: Japan
- Sport: Athletics
- Event: Long jump

Achievements and titles
- Personal best: 8.20 m (Tottori 2004)
Medal record
Men's athletics
Representing Japan
Asian Championships
Bronze medal – third place	2003 Manila	Long jump

Shinichi Terano (寺野 伸一, Terano Shin'ichi; born 10 July 1979) is a Japanese long jumper. His personal best jump is 8.20 metres, achieved in June 2004 in Tottori.

He won the bronze medal at the 2003 Asian Championships. He also competed at the 2004 Olympic Games and the 2005 World Championships without reaching the final.

== Competition record ==
Year	Competition	Venue	Position	Notes
Representing Japan
1998	World Junior Championships	Annecy, France	25th (q)	7.25 m (wind: -0.8 m/s)
1999	Universiade	Palma de Mallorca, Spain	14th (q)	7.52 m (wind: +1.2 m/s)
2002	Asian Games	Busan, South Korea	5th	7.71 m (wind: -0.2 m/s)
2003	Asian Championships	Manila, Philippines	3rd	8.04 m (wind: +1.8 m/s)
2004	Olympic Games	Athens, Greece	29th (q)	7.70 m (wind: +0.9 m/s)
2005	World Championships	Helsinki, Finland	21st (q)	7.27 m (wind: +0.7 m/s)
2005	Asian Championships	Incheon, South Korea	9th	7.45 m (wind: 0.0 m/s)

== National titles ==
- Japanese Championships
  - Long jump: 2002, 2003, 2004, 2005
