= 2007 Asian Athletics Championships – Men's 100 metres =

The men's 100 metres event at the 2007 Asian Athletics Championships was held in Amman, Jordan on July 25–26.

== Medalists ==
Gold	Silver	Bronze
Samuel Francis; Qatar	Masahide Ueno; Japan	Al-Waleed Abdulla; Qatar

== Results ==
=== Heats ===
Rank	Heat	Name	Nationality	Time	Notes
1	4	Samuel Francis	Qatar	10.18	Q, CR
2	2	Al-Waleed Abdulla	Qatar	10.42	Q
3	3	Masahide Ueno	Japan	10.45	Q
4	2	Lim Hee-Nam	South Korea	10.46	Q
5	3	Umnrisa Surehdra	Sri Lanka	10.49	Q
6	2	Yahya Habeeb	Saudi Arabia	10.51	Q
6	3	Wachara Sondee	Thailand	10.51	Q
8	1	Yahya Al-Gahes	Saudi Arabia	10.55	Q
8	4	Siriroj Darasuriyong	Thailand	10.55	Q
10	2	Lai Chun Ho	Hong Kong	10.56	q
11	1	Khalil Al-Hanahneh	Jordan	10.64	Q
11	3	Wang Wen-Tang	Chinese Taipei	10.64	q
13	1	Lee Jun-Woo	South Korea	10.65	Q
14	2	Rashid Arnous	Jordan	10.66	q
14	4	Suryo Agung Wibowo	Indonesia	10.66	Q
16	4	Mohamed Sanad Al-Rasheedi	Bahrain	10.67	q
17	2	Yi Wei-Chen	Chinese Taipei	10.68	
18	4	Rayzam Shah Wan Sofian	Malaysia	10.74	
19	3	Yip Siu Keung	Hong Kong	10.75	
20	2	Moussallem Haykal	Lebanon	10.87	
21	1	Arnold Villarube	Philippines	10.88	
22	3	Poh Seng Song	Singapore	10.89	
23	3	Jarrah Al-Khadher	Kuwait	11.05	
24	1	Wen Yongyi	China	11.06	
25	1	Sim Chee Hao Alfred	Singapore	11.19	
26	1	Saad Al-Yahya	Kuwait	11.44	
27	2	Mohammad Shamsuddin	Bangladesh	11.60	
28	4	Zahir Naseer	Maldives	11.63	
	1	Tamim Mohammad Siraj	Lebanon	DNS	

=== Semifinals ===
Wind: Heat 1: +1.5 m/s, Heat 2: +4.2 m/s

Rank	Heat	Name	Nationality	Time	Notes
1	2	Masahide Ueno	Japan	10.16	Q
2	1	Samuel Francis	Qatar	10.19	Q
3	2	Siriroj Darasuriyong	Thailand	10.26	Q
4	2	Al-Waleed Abdulla	Qatar	10.27	Q
5	2	Umnrisa Surehdra	Sri Lanka	10.31	Q
6	2	Yahya Habeeb	Saudi Arabia	10.36	
7	2	Rashid Arnous	Jordan	10.39	
8	1	Wachara Sondee	Thailand	10.45	Q
8	1	Yahya Al-Gahes	Saudi Arabia	10.45	Q
8	2	Lee Jun-Woo	South Korea	10.45	
11	1	Lim Hee-Nam	South Korea	10.48	Q
12	1	Khalil Al-Hanahneh	Jordan	10.52	
13	1	Lai Chun Ho	Hong Kong	10.55	
14	1	Suryo Agung Wibowo	Indonesia	10.63	
15	1	Wang Wen-Tang	Chinese Taipei	10.75	
	2	Mohamed Sanad Al-Rasheedi	Bahrain	DNS	

=== Final ===
Wind: +0.9 m/s

Rank	Lane	Name	Nationality	Time	Notes
1st place, gold medalist(s)	5	Samuel Francis	Qatar	9.99	AR, CR
2nd place, silver medalist(s)	4	Masahide Ueno	Japan	10.26	
3rd place, bronze medalist(s)	7	Al-Waleed Abdulla	Qatar	10.30	
4	3	Wachara Sondee	Thailand	10.36	
5	6	Siriroj Darasuriyong	Thailand	10.36	
5	8	Umnrisa Surehdra	Sri Lanka	10.36	
7	1	Lim Hee-Nam	South Korea	10.42	
8	2	Yahya Al-Gahes	Saudi Arabia	10.44	
