= Rudon Bastian =

Bahamian long jumper

Personal information
- Born: 13 January 1987 (age 39) Nassau, Bahamas

Sport
- Sport: Track and field
- Club: Louisville Cardinals
Medal record
Representing Bahamas
Central American and Caribbean Junior Championships
Silver medal – second place	2006 Port of Spain	Long jump U20
Central American and Caribbean Championships
Bronze medal – third place	2009 Havana	Long jump

Rudon Bastian (born 13 January 1987) is a retired Bahamian long jumper and triple jumper.

As a junior he finished eleventh at the 2006 World Junior Championships, won the silver medal at the 2006 Central American and Caribbean Junior Championships, and finished ninth at the 2008 NACAC Under-23 Championships.

He won the bronze medal at the 2009 Central American and Caribbean Championships, finished fourth at the 2010 Central American and Caribbean Games, seventh at the 2011 Pan American Games and sixth at the 2013 Central American and Caribbean Championships.

His personal best jump is 8.12 metres, achieved in July 2016 in Jacksonville.
