= Li Runrun =

Chinese long jumper (born 1983)

Medal record

Men's athletics

Representing China

Asian Championships
Bronze medal – third place	2007 Amman	Long jump

Li Runrun (born 24 February 1983 in Nanjing) is a Chinese long jumper.

He won the bronze medal at the 2007 Asian Championships. He also competed at the 2007 World Championships, the 2008 World Indoor Championships and the 2008 Olympic Games without reaching the final.

His personal best jump is 8.22 metres, achieved in July 2007 in Wuhan.
