= Kenji Fujikawa =

Japanese long jumper (born 1984)

Personal information
- Nationality: Japanese
- Born: 7 July 1984 (age 41) Tokushima Prefecture, Japan
- Education: University of Tsukuba
- Height: 1.78 m (5 ft 10 in)
- Weight: 64 kg (141 lb)

Sport
- Country: Japan
- Sport: Athletics
- Event: Long jump

Achievements and titles
- Personal best: 7.91 m (Kobe 2006)
Medal record
East Asian Games
Silver medal – second place	2005 Macau	Long jump

Kenji Fujikawa (藤川 健司, Fujikawa Kenji; born 7 July 1984 in Tokushima Prefecture) is a Japanese long jumper. He is the 2006 national champion in the event and finished sixth at the 2006 Asian Games.

== Personal bests ==
Event	Performance	Competition	Venue	Date
Outdoor	7.91 m (wind: +0.7 m/s)	National Sports Festival	Kobe, Japan	9 October 2006

== International competition ==
Year	Competition	Venue	Position	Event	Measure
Representing Japan
2001	World Youth Championships	Debrecen, Hungary	4th	Long jump	7.46 m (wind: +0.5 m/s)
2002	Asian Junior Championships	Bangkok, Thailand	5th	Long jump	7.50 m
2005	East Asian Games	Macau, China	2nd	Long jump	7.73 m (wind: -0.1 m/s)
2006	Asian Games	Doha, Qatar	6th	Long jump	7.69 m (wind: +0.3 m/s)

== National titles ==
- Japanese Championships
  - Long jump: 2006
