= Leandro de Jesus =

Brazilian politician (born 1981)

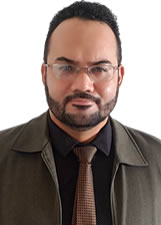

Member of the Chamber of Deputies
- Incumbent
- Assumed office 1 February 2023
- Constituency: Bahia

Personal details
- Born: 19 November 1981 (age 44)
- Party: Liberal Party (since 2022)

Leandro Silva De Jesus (born November 19, 1981 in Salvador) is a lawyer and state deputy for the state of Bahia. He is a member of the Liberal Party (PL) in Brazil.

Year	Election	Position	Party	Votes	%	Result
2022	State of Bahia	State deputy	PL	39.206	0.49%	Elected
