= Li Jinzhe =

Chinese long jumper (born 1989)

Personal information
- Born: September 1, 1989 (age 37) Beijing
- Height: 1.90 m (6 ft 3 in)
- Weight: 78 kg (172 lb)

Sport
- Country: China
- Sport: Athletics
- Event: Long jump

Achievements and titles
- Personal best: 8.47 m
Medal record
Asian Games
Gold medal – first place	2014 Incheon	Long jump
World Indoor Championships
Silver medal – second place	2014 Sopot	Long jump
Asian Championships
Gold medal – first place	2009 Guangzhou	Long jump
Asian Indoor Championships
Gold medal – first place	2012 Hangzhou	Long jump
East Asian Games
Gold medal – first place	2009 Hong Kong	Long jump

Li Jinzhe (Chinese: 李金哲; born 1 September 1989) is a Chinese track and field athlete who specialises in the long jump. His personal best is 8.47 metres, set in 2014. This gives him the Chinese record long jump.

He was the 2009 Asian Champion in the event and represented China at the 2009 World Championships in Athletics. He became regional champion for a second time at the 2012 Asian Indoor Athletics Championships and made his Olympic debut at the 2012 Summer Olympics later that year.

== Career ==
Born in Beijing, Li began competing in 2007 and was runner-up behind Su Xiongfeng at that year's Chinese City Games – the country's foremost junior competition. He gained his first international medal (a bronze) at the 2008 Asian Junior Athletics Championships. He cleared eight metres for the first time at the 2009 Chinese Championships in May, where his jump of 8.08 m brought him his first national title.

Li was selected to represent China in the long jump at the 2009 World Championships in Athletics and narrowly missed out on qualification into the final. At the 11th Chinese National Games in October he set a personal best of 8.18 m and came second behind Zhang Xiaoyi. He remained in good form, jumping 8.16 m the following month to win at the 2009 Asian Athletics Championships. He continued competing into mid-December and built upon his Asian title with a gold medal at the 2009 East Asian Games.

He featured indoors in Germany at the start of 2010, setting an indoor best of 7.98 m for second place behind Salim Sdiri at the BW-Bank Meeting and then turning the tables on the Frenchman to win at the Sparkassen Cup. He attended the 2010 IAAF World Indoor Championships in Doha, but failed to make it past the qualifying round. In the outdoor season he placed top three at the Prefontaine Classic and the Rieti Meeting on the athletics circuit. Li attempted to defend his national long jump title at the Chinese Championships in August, but was beaten into second by Su Xiongfeng. He ended the year with a fourth-place finish at the 2010 IAAF Continental Cup, representing the Asia-Pacific team.

Li took another victory at the Sparkassen Cup in January 2011, defeating Sdiri and Dwight Phillips. His best jump that year (8.02 m) came early in the season in Fuzhou that June. His performances were lower than in previous years and he did not defend his title at the 2011 Asian Athletics Championships, managing only fifth place. He performed better the year after, taking the gold at the 2012 Asian Indoor Athletics Championships and winning all but one of his outings on the Chinese and Asian Grand Prix circuits. He cleared 8.25 m in Wuhan. He was chosen for the Chinese team for the 2012 London Olympics and competed in the qualifying rounds only.

An indoor best of 8.11 m came at the start of 2013, when he took third at the XL Galan meet in Stockholm. Li jumped a new personal best of 8.34 m at the 2013 Shanghai Golden Grand Prix, defeating a quality field including the last three Olympic champions (Phillips, Irving Saladino and Greg Rutherford) as well as Mitchell Watt and Aleksandr Menkov. He won his hometown meet, the inaugural IAAF World Challenge Beijing at the Bird's Nest Stadium, a few days later with a mark of 8.31 m.

In the early morning of March 9, 2014, Li Jinzhe missed the chance to win the World Indoor Championships in Sopot. He was reversed by Brazilian star Da Silva's final jump of 8.28 meters, and finally won a silver medal with a score of 8.23 meters. In the early morning of June 29, at the long jump special competition held in Bad Langensalza, Germany, Li Jinzhe won the championship with a score of 8.47 meters in the sixth jump, and broke Lao Jianfeng's record in May 1997. The national record of 8.40 meters was set on the 28th. On September 30, in the men's long jump final of the Incheon Asian Games, Li Jinzhe won the gold medal with a time of 8.01 meters. Incheon's victory also made up for the regret left by the Guangzhou Asian Games.

== Competition record ==
Year	Competition	Venue	Position	Notes
Representing China
2007	Asian Championships	Amman, Jordan	8th	7.62 m (w)
2009	World Championships	Berlin, Germany	13th (q)	8.01 m
2009	Asian Championships	Guangzhou, China	1st	8.16 m
2009	East Asian Games	Hong Kong	1st	7.85 m
2010	World Indoor Championships	Doha, Qatar	18th (q)	7.68 m
2010	Continental Cup	Split, Croatia	4th	7.93 m
2011	Asian Championships	Kobe, Japan	5th	7.79 m
2012	Asian Indoor Championships	Hangzhou, China	1st	7.98 m
2012	Olympic Games	London, United Kingdom	20th (q)	7.77 m
2013	World Championships	Moscow, Russia	12th	7.86 m
2014	World Indoor Championships	Sopot, Poland	2nd	8.23 m
2014	Asian Games	Incheon, South Korea	1st	8.01 m
2015	World Championships	Beijing, China	5th	8.10 m
