= Konstantin Safronov =

Kazakhstani long jumper (born 1987)

Konstantin Safronov (born 2 September 1987) is a Kazakhstani athlete specialising in the long jump. He represented his country at two world championships, in 2009 and 2013, without qualifying for the final.

He has personal bests of 8.10 metres outdoors (Almaty 2013) and 7.93 metres indoors (Karaganda 2006).

He is the husband of Olga Safronova (née Bludova), a Kazakhstani sprinter.

== Competition record ==
Year	Competition	Venue	Position	Event	Notes
Representing Kazakhstan
2003	World Youth Championships	Sherbrooke, Canada	26th (q)	Long jump	6.64 m
2003	World Youth Championships	Sherbrooke, Canada	5th	Triple jump	15.17 m
2005	Asian Championships	Incheon, South Korea	9th (q)	Long jump	7.56 m
2005	Asian Indoor Games	Pattaya, Thailand	–	Long jump	NM
2006	World Junior Championships	Beijing, China	16th (q)	Long jump	7.35 m (wind: -0.3 m/s)
2006	Asian Games	Doha, Qatar	12th	Long jump	7.28 m
2007	Asian Championships	Amman, Jordan	5th	Long jump	7.77 m
2007	Universiade	Bangkok, Thailand	6th	Long jump	7.86 m
2007	Asian Indoor Games	Macau, China	3rd	Long jump	7.51 m
2008	Asian Indoor Championships	Doha, Qatar	5th	Long jump	7.56 m
2009	World Championships	Berlin, Germany	39th (q)	Long jump	7.54 m
2009	Asian Championships	Guangzhou, China	–	Long jump	NM
2009	Asian Indoor Games	Hanoi, Vietnam	7th	Long jump	7.57 m
2010	Asian Games	Guangzhou, China	8th	Long jump	7.41 m
2011	Asian Championships	Kobe, Japan	8th	Long jump	7.62 m
2011	Universiade	Shenzhen, China	–	Long jump	NM
2012	Asian Indoor Championships	Hangzhou, China	6th	Long jump	7.57 m
2013	World Championships	Moscow, Russia	26th (q)	Long jump	7.47 m
2014	Asian Indoor Championships	Hangzhou, China	5th	Long jump	7.50 m
2014	Asian Games	Incheon, South Korea	8th	Long jump	7.47 m
2015	Asian Championships	Wuhan, China	8th	Long jump	7.45 m
2015	Universiade	Gwangju, South Korea	21st (q)	Long jump	7.24 m
