= Abdulrahman Al-Nubi =

Qatari long jumper (born 1979)

Abdul Rahman Al-Nubi
Personal information
- Full name: Abdulrahman Faraj Al- Nubi
- Nationality: Qatar
- Born: 17 October 1979 (age 46) Doha, Qatar
- Height: 1.92 m (6 ft 3 1/2 in)
- Weight: 77 kg (170 lb)

Sport
- Sport: Athletics
- Event: Long jump

Achievements and titles
- Personal best: Long jump: 8.13 (2003)
Medal record
Men's athletics
Representing Qatar
Asian Championships
Bronze medal – third place	1995 Jakarta	Long jump
Bronze medal – third place	2000 Jakarta	Long jump

Abdulrahman Faraj Sultan Al-Nubi (Arabic: عبد الرحمن سلطان فرج سلطان النوبي; born October 17, 1979, in Doha) is a retired Qatari long jumper. He represented his nation Qatar in two editions of the Olympic Games (2000 and 2004), and also acquired a personal best of 8.13 metres in the long jump to top the prelims at the 2003 Asian Athletics Championships in Manila, Philippines. He is also the younger brother of relay runner and two-time Olympian Mubarak Al-Nubi.

Al-Nubi made his official debut at the 2000 Summer Olympics in Sydney, where he failed to record a legal distance upon committing a foul in each of his three successive attempts during the prelims of the men's long jump.

At the 2004 Summer Olympics in Athens, Al-Nubi qualified for his second Qatari squad, as a 24-year-old, in the men's long jump, by spanning a Qatari record-breaking leap of 8.13 m to snare an Olympic B-standard from the Asian Championships in Manila, Philippines one year earlier. Unlike his previous Olympic feat, Al-Nubi started with a clear foul, but quickly redeemed himself to touch the ground at a satisfying leap of 7.41 m on his second attempt. Since his third jump was slightly shorter than his best by a 15 cm deficit, Al-Nubi wound up to thirty-seventh spot in a field of forty-one athletes, and did not advance past the qualifying round.
