= Rustam Khusnutdinov =

Uzbekistani long jumper

Rustam Khusnutdinov (born 14 November 1975) is a former Uzbek long jump athlete who competed in the event in the 2000 Summer Olympics. His furthest jump was a 7.24, not enough to qualify. His best ever recorded jump was a 7.95, achieved the same year.
