= Yu Zhenwei =

Chinese track and field athlete

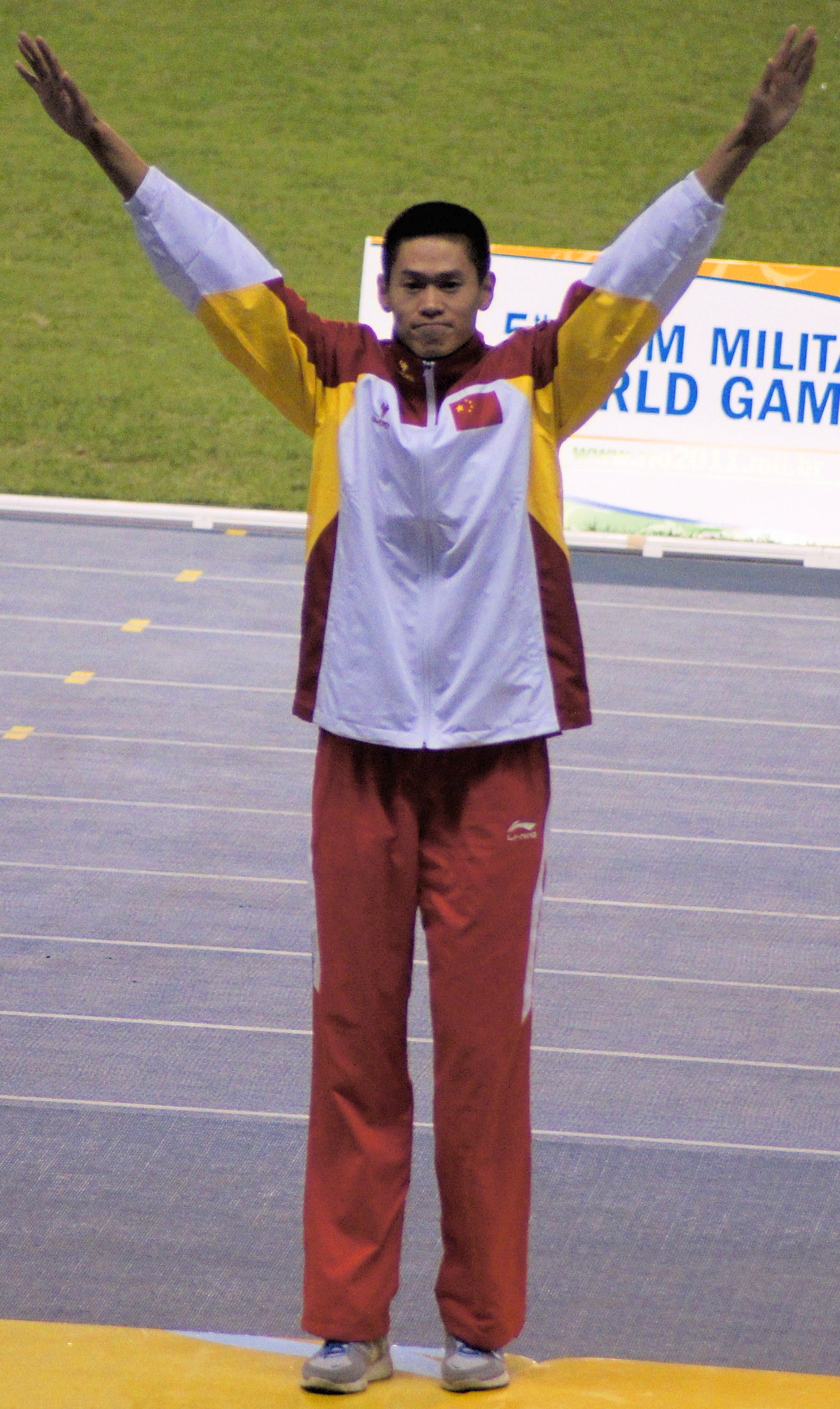
- Yu at the 2011 Military World Games

Personal information
- Born: 18 March 1986 (age 40)

Sport
- Sport: Athletics
- Event(s): Long jump, triple jump

Achievements and titles
- Personal best(s): LJ - 8.12 m (2010); TJ - 16.53 m (2006)
Medal record
Representing China
Military World Games
Gold medal – first place	2011 Rio de Janeiro	Long jump
Asian Championships
Bronze medal – third place	2009 Guangzhou	Long jump

Yu Zhenwei (Chinese: 于震威; born 18 March 1986) is a retired Chinese athlete who competed in the long jump and triple jump. He represented his country at the 2010 IAAF World Indoor Championships and was a bronze medallist at the 2009 Asian Athletics Championships for the host nation.

Yu is a two-time world military champion, having won at the 2009 World Military Track and Field Championships and the 2011 Military World Games.

== International competitions ==
Year	Competition	Venue	Position	Event	Notes
2004	World Junior Championships	Grosseto, Italy	6th	Long jump	7.55 m
2009	World Military Championships	Sofia, Bulgaria	1st	Long jump	7.83 m
2009	Asian Championships	Guangzhou, China	3rd	Long jump	7.96 m
2010	World Indoor Championships	Doha, Qatar	22nd	Long jump	7.54 m
2011	Military World Games	Rio de Janeiro, Brazil	1st	Long jump	8.05 m
