= Huang Le (long jumper) =

Chinese long jumper (born 1977)

Medal record

Men's athletics

Representing China

Asian Championships
Bronze medal – third place	2002 Colombo	Long jump

Huang Le (Chinese: 黄乐; born 10 September 1977) is a retired male long jumper from the People's Republic of China.

He won the bronze medal at the 2002 Asian Championships. His personal best jump is 8.21 metres, achieved when he won the 1999 World Military Games in Zagreb.

== Achievements ==
Year	Competition	Venue	Position	Notes
Representing China
1996	World Junior Championships	Sydney, Australia	15th (q)	7.43 m (wind: +0.1 m/s)
1996	Asian Junior Championships	New Delhi, India	1st	7.68 m
1999	World Championships	Seville, Spain	6th	8.01 m
2001	East Asian Games	Osaka, Japan	3rd	7.77 m
2002	Asian Championships	Colombo, Sri Lanka	3rd	7.91 m (w)
2002	Asian Games	Busan, South Korea	4th	7.75 m
2003	Universiade	Daegu, South Korea	7th	7.78 m
