= Henry Dagmil =

Filipino long jumper (born 1981)

Personal information
- Full name: Henry Dagmil
- Nationality: Filipino
- Born: December 7, 1981 (age 44) Tampakan, South Cotabato, Philippines
- Height: 172 cm (68 in) (2015)
- Weight: 75 kg (165 lb) (2015)

Sport
- Country: Philippines
- Sport: Track and field
- Event: Long Jump
- College team: Mapua Institute of Technology
- Coached by: Arnold Villarube (2015)

Achievements and titles
- Personal best: 7.99 m (2008)
Medal record
Southeast Asian Games
Representing Philippines
Gold medal – first place	2005 Manila	Long Jump
Gold medal – first place	2007 Nakhon Ratchasima	Long Jump
Gold medal – first place	2013 Naypyidaw	Long Jump
Silver medal – second place	2005 Manila	4 x 100 m relay
Silver medal – second place	2011 Indonesia	Long Jump
Bronze medal – third place	2009 Vientiane	Long Jump

Henry Dagmil (born 7 December 1981) is a Filipino long jumper. His personal best jump is 7.99 metres, achieved on June 7, 2008, in Los Angeles. He is a multi-titled long jumper as well as short-distance runner, having to compete in the Men's 4 × 100 m as well. He currently holds the Southeast Asian Games Record at the Men's Long Jump at 7.87 m he set at the 2007 edition in Nakhon Ratchasima in Thailand.

He has represented the Philippines locally and internationally from Philippine National Games, Regional Meets such as the Southeast Asian Games where he already earned three gold medals and the Asian Games where he finished fifth at the 2006 Asian Games. He also competed at the 2008 Olympic Games without reaching the final and the 2009 and 2011 World Championships in Athletics.

== Competition record ==
Year	Competition	Venue	Position	Event	Notes
Representing Philippines
2003	Asian Championships	Manila, Philippines	23rd (h)	200 m	22.29 s
2003	Asian Championships	Manila, Philippines	19th (q)	Long jump	7.21 m
2003	Asian Championships	Manila, Philippines	16th (q)	Triple jump	14.71 m
2005	Asian Championships	Incheon, South Korea	5th	Long jump	7.75 m
2005	Southeast Asian Games	Manila, Philippines	2nd	4 × 100 m relay	40.55 s
2005	Southeast Asian Games	Manila, Philippines	1st	Long jump	7.81 m
2006	Asian Games	Doha, Qatar	5th	Long jump	7.76 m
2007	Southeast Asian Games	Nakhon Ratchasima, Thailand	1st	Long jump	7.87 m
2008	Olympic Games	Beijing, China	34th (q)	Long jump	7.58 m
2009	World Championships	Berlin, Germany	—	Long jump	NM
2009	Southeast Asian Games	Vientiane, Laos	3rd	Long jump	7.72 m
2010	Asian Games	Guangzhou, China	6th	Long jump	7.52 m
2011	World Championships	Daegu, South Korea	—	Long jump	NM
2011	Southeast Asian Games	Palembang, Indonesia	2nd	Long jump	7.78 m
2013	Asian Championships	Pune, India	11th	Long jump	7.27 m
2013	Southeast Asian Games	Naypyidaw, Myanmar	1st	Long jump	7.72 m
2014	Asian Indoor Championships	Hangzhou, China	6th	Long jump	7.43 m
2014	Asian Games	Incheon, South Korea	11th	Long jump	7.43 m
