= Mohammad Arzandeh =

Iranian long jumper

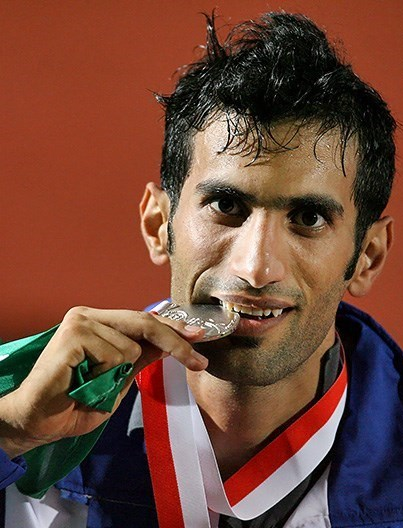
- Arzandeh in 2013

Medal record

Representing Iran

Men's athletics

Asian Indoor Championships
Silver medal – second place	2014 Hangzhou	Long jump

Islamic Solidarity Games
Silver medal – second place	2013 Palembang	Long jump

Mohammad Arzandeh (Persian: محمد ارزنده; born 30 October 1987 in Borujen) is an Iranian long jumper. He competed in the long jump event at the 2012 Summer Olympics.

== Competition record ==
Year	Competition	Venue	Position	Notes
Representing Iran
2005	Asian Indoor Games	Pattaya, Thailand	5th	7.32 m
2006	Asian Junior Championships	Macau	3rd	7.59 m
2006	World Junior Championships	Beijing, China	4th	7.67 m (+0.4 m/s)
2006	Asian Games	Doha, Qatar	15th (q)	6.92 m
2007	Asian Indoor Games	Macau	5th	7.39 m
2009	Asian Indoor Games	Hanoi, Vietnam	6th	7.60 m
2012	Olympic Games	London, United Kingdom	17th (q)	7.84 m
2013	Asian Championships	Pune, India	4th	7.76 m
2013	Islamic Solidarity Games	Palembang, Indonesia	2nd	7.70 m
2014	Asian Indoor Championships	Hangzhou, China	2nd	7.80 m
2014	Asian Games	Incheon, South Korea	6th	7.56 m
2016	Olympic Games	Rio de Janeiro, Brazil	29th (q)	7.31 m
2018	Asian Indoor Championships	Tehran, Iran	9th	7.27 m
