= Supanara Sukhasvasti =

Thai long jumper (born 1992)

Personal information
- Born: June 11, 1992 (age 34)
- Height: 1.9 m (6 ft 3 in)
- Weight: 72 kg (159 lb)

Sport
- Country: Thailand
- Sport: Athletics
- Event: Long jump
Medal record
Asian Championships
Silver medal – second place	2011 Kobe	Long jump
Southeast Asian Games
Gold medal – first place	2011 Palembang	Long jump
Gold medal – first place	2015 Singapore	Long jump
World Youth Championships
Gold medal – first place	2009 Brixen	Long jump
Silver medal – second place	2009 Brixen	Triple jump
Asian Junior Championships
Silver medal – second place	2010 Hanoi	Long jump
- Updated on 15 August 2012

Supanara Sukhasvasti na Ayudhya (often S.N.A. for the second name; Thai: ศุภนร ศุขสวัสดิ ณ อยุธยา; RTGS: Suphanara Suksawat Na Ayutthaya, born June 11, 1992, in Chiang Mai) is a Thai long jumper. By winning the gold in the long jump at the 2009 World Youth Championships in Athletics, he became Thailand's first ever finalist, medallist and champion in an athletics global event of any age category. He is also the Thai record holder in the long jump.

== Career ==
At the 2009 World Youth Championships in Athletics, Suksawasti won the gold in the long jump with a distance of 7.65 m. He also won a silver in the triple jump with a distance of 15.70 m.

On 5 June 2010, he became the first athlete of Southeast Asia to leap over 8.00 meters in long jump when he registered 8.04 (+1.4) during the Asian Grand Prix in Bangalore. A few weeks later, he took the silver medal in the long jump behind Lin Ching-Hsuan at the 2010 Asian Junior Athletics Championships. At the 2011 Asian Athletics Championships in Kobe, Suksawasti won a silver medal in the long jump behind Chinese jumper Su Xiongfeng. It was his first medal in a senior meet.

== Personal ==
Supanara Sukhasvasti na Ayudhya is a descendant of King Rama IV.

== Personal bests ==
As of July 10, 2011.

Event	Best (m)	Wind	Venue	Date
Long jump	8.05 NR	1.3 m/s	Kobe	July 10, 2011
Triple jump	15.83	0.9 m/s	Suphanburi	July 25, 2009
Long jump (indoor)	7.39	N/A	Hanoi	November 1, 2009

Key: NR = National record
