= Masaki Morinaga =

Japanese long jumper

Medal record

Men's athletics

Representing Japan

Asian Championships
Gold medal – first place	1998 Fukuoka	Long jump
Silver medal – second place	1991 Kuala Lumpur	Long jump

Masaki Morinaga (森長 正樹, Morinaga Masaki; born March 27, 1972) is a Japanese retired long jumper. He won the long jump at the 1998 Asian Championships and the 1998 Asian Games.

== International competitions ==
Representing Japan
Year	Competition	Venue	Position	Notes
1990	World Junior Championships	Plovdiv, Bulgaria	19th (q)	7.29 m
1991	Asian Championships	Kuala Lumpur, Malaysia	2nd	8.02 m
1997	East Asian Games	Busan, South Korea	1st	8.13 m
1997	World Championships	Athens, Greece	9th	7.86 m
1998	Asian Games	Bangkok, Thailand	1st	8.10 m
1998	IAAF World Cup	Johannesburg, South Africa	6th	7.76 m
1998	Asian Championships	Fukuoka, Japan	1st	8.08 m
1999	World Indoor Championships	Maebashi, Japan	7th	8.07 m
2000	Olympic Games	Sydney, Australia	21st (q)	7.84 m
2001	East Asian Games	Osaka, Japan	2nd	8.02 m
2002	Asian Championships	Colombo, Sri Lanka	5th	7.87 m
