= Saleh Al-Haddad =

Kuwaiti long jumper (born 1986)

Medal record

Men's athletics

Representing Kuwait

Asian Games
Silver medal – second place	2006 Doha	Long jump

Asian Championships
Silver medal – second place	2007 Amman	Long jump

Asian Indoor Games
Silver medal – second place	2005 Bangkok	Long jump

Asian Indoor Championships
Gold medal – first place	2014 Hangzhou	Long jump
Silver medal – second place	2008 Doha	Long jump
Bronze medal – third place	2006 Pattaya	Long jump

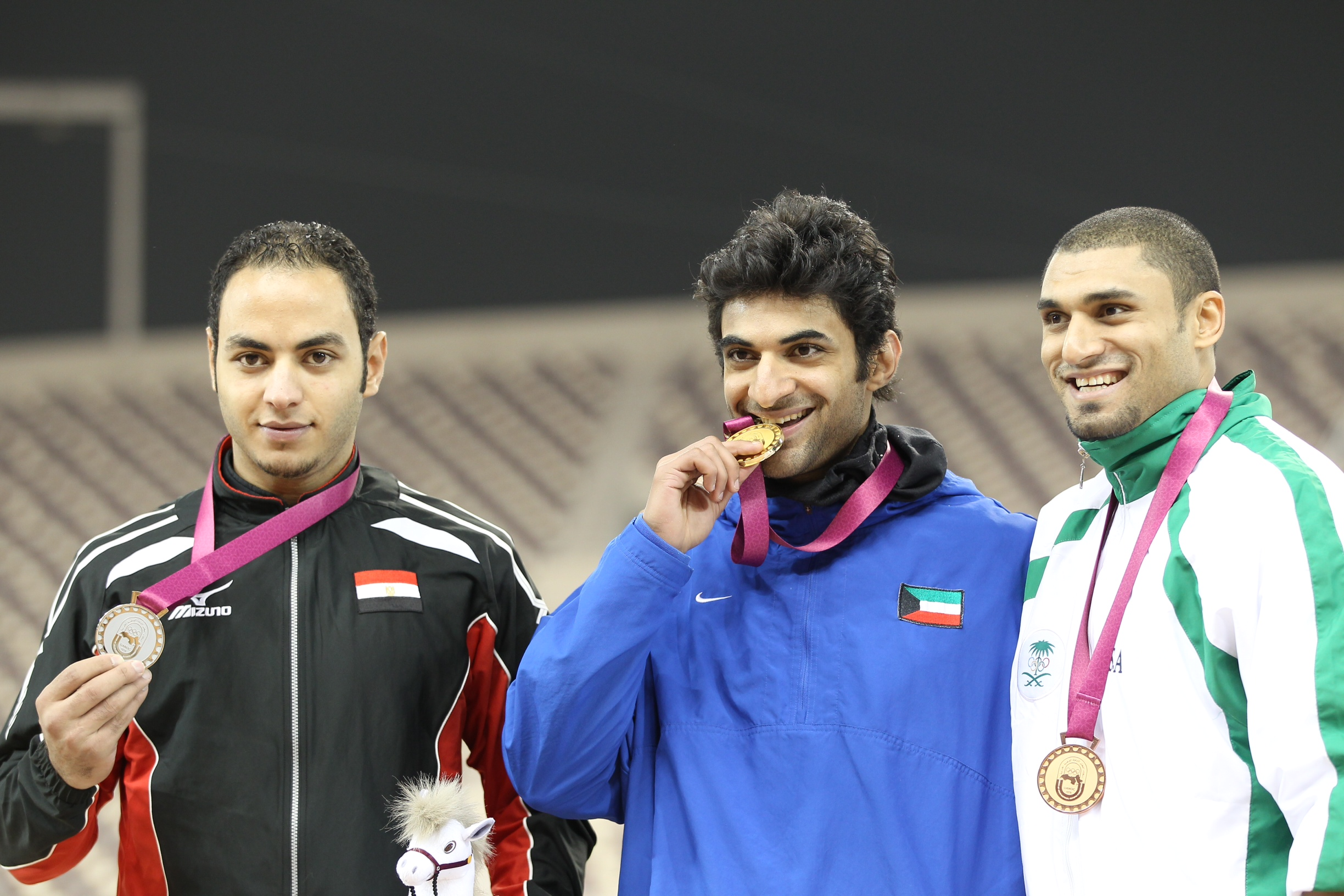
Saleh Alhaddad with Arab Games gold Medal (2011)

Saleh Abdelaziz Alhaddad (Arabic: صالح عبدالعزيز الحداد; born 7 April 1986) is a Kuwaiti track and field athlete who specialises in the long jump. He holds the Kuwaiti records for the event with bests of 7.94 m (26 ft 1/2 in) indoors and 8.02 m (26 ft 3 1/2 in) outdoors. He also holds the national best for the 60 metres, with his time of 6.78 seconds. He represented Kuwait at the global level at the 2008 IAAF World Indoor Championships and the 2003 World Youth Championships in Athletics.

Al-Haddad has had international success at regional and continental level. His best results were silver medals at the 2006 Asian Games and 2007 Asian Athletics Championships. He has won a medal of each colour during his career at the Asian Indoor Athletics Championships (with a gold coming in 2014). He has had podium finishes in regional events including the Pan Arab Games, Arab Athletics Championships, West Asian Games and GCC Athletics Championships.

== Career ==
His first medals came at the Gulf Cooperation Council Youth Championships, where he was runner-up in 2002 then won the long jump in a personal best of 7.50 m (24 ft 7 1/4 in) in 2003. He represented his country at the 2003 World Youth Championships in Athletics and competed in the long jump, triple jump and in the Swedish medley relay. He was the winner of the long jump at the Arab Junior Athletics Championships the following year.

Al-Haddad began competing at senior level in 2005 and won several medals in his first such season: he was the bronze medallist at the Gulf Cooperation Council Athletics Championships and the 2005 Arab Athletics Championships, the gold medallist at the 2005 West Asian Games, and eighth at the higher level 2005 Asian Athletics Championships. He set national junior records indoors and out with a best of 7.83 m (25 ft 8 1/4 in) in March then a jump of 7.52 m (24 ft 8 in) in November (which earned him the silver medal at the 2005 Asian Indoor Games). He also helped the Kuwaiti 4×400 metres relay team to fourth place at the Asian Indoor Games. More indoor success followed three months later at the 2006 Asian Indoor Athletics Championships, where he was the bronze medallist in the long jump, but failed to finish in the relay event. The highlight of his 2006 season was silver medal in the long jump (behind defending champion Hussein Al-Sabee) at the 2006 Asian Games in a personal best of 7.88 m (25 ft 10 in). He also represented Kuwait in the 4×100 metres relay at the meeting, but the team failed to finish.

He won two medals in 2007: a bronze at the Arab Championships and a silver at the Asian Championships He was two centimetres short of a medal at the 2007 Asian Indoor Games, taking fourth behind Konstantin Safronov. Al-Haddad broke the Kuwaiti indoor record with a mark of 7.88 m (25 ft 10 in) at the 2008 Asian Indoor Athletics Championships, which was enough for second behind Mohammed Al-Khuwalidi. This earned him qualification for the 2008 IAAF World Indoor Championships, but he did progress beyond the qualifying round. With bests of 6.78 seconds for the 60 metres and 8.02 m (26 ft 3 1/2 in) in the long jump, Al-Haddad broke two national records in 2008. He was third at the GCC Championships, but came only seventh at the 2009 Asian Athletics Championships and fifth at the Asian Indoor Games. His sole international outing of 2010 was a bronze medal performance at the West Asian Athletics Championships.

Al-Haddad won his first major regional gold medals at the 2011 GCC Games and the 2011 Pan Arab Games. He achieved his second best mark ever in January 2012 with a jump of 8.01 m (26 ft 3 1/4 in), but he did not fare well in major competition that year and failed to register a valid jump at the 2012 Asian Indoor Athletics Championships. He did not compete for 18 months and on his return took a bronze medal at the 2013 Islamic Solidarity Games. He was back to his best at the 2014 Asian Indoor Athletics Championships, taking the title with a national indoor record of 7.94 m (26 ft 1/2 in).
