= Kim Deok-hyeon =

South Korean athlete (born 1985)

Personal information
- Born: December 8, 1985 (age 40) Kwangju, South Korea
- Height: 1.80 m (5 ft 11 in)
- Weight: 68 kg (150 lb)

Sport
- Country: South Korea
- Sport: Athletics
- Events: Triple jump, Long jump
- Coached by: Kim Hyuk Suren Ghazaryan Park Yeong-jun
Medal record
Asian Games
| Gold medal – first place | 2010 Guangzhou | Long jump |
| Bronze medal – third place | 2006 Doha | Triple jump |
Asian Championships
| Gold medal – first place | 2015 Wuhan | Triple jump |
| Silver medal – second place | 2007 Amman | Triple jump |
| Bronze medal – third place | 2005 Incheon | Triple jump |
Universiade
| Gold medal – first place | 2007 Bangkok | Triple jump |
| Gold medal – first place | 2009 Belgrade | Long jump |
- Updated on 15 August 2012

Kim Deok-hyeon (Korean pronunciation: [kim.dʌ.kʰjʌn] or [kim] [tʌ.kʰjʌn]; born 8 December 1985 in Kwangju) is a South Korean triple jumper and long jumper.

He won bronze medals at the 2005 Asian Championships and the 2006 Asian Games, the gold medal at the 2007 Summer Universiade, the silver medal at the 2007 Asian Championships and finished ninth at the 2007 World Championships. He also competed at the 2006 World Indoor Championships without reaching the final.

== International competitions ==
| Year | Competition | Venue | Position | Event | Notes |
Representing South Korea
| 2004 | World Junior Championships | Grosseto, Italy | 21st (q) | Long jump | 7.12 m (-1.2 m/s) |
| 2004 | World Junior Championships | Grosseto, Italy | 16th (q) | Triple jump | 15.40 m (-0.4 m/s) |
| 2005 | Asian Championships | Incheon, South Korea | 3rd | Triple jump | 16.78 m |
| 2005 | East Asian Games | Macau | 1st | Triple jump | 16.79 m |
| 2006 | World Indoor Championships | Moscow, Russia | 21st (q) | Triple jump | 15.99 m |
| 2006 | Asian Games | Doha, Qatar | 3rd | Triple jump | 16.87 m |
| 2007 | Universiade | Bangkok, Thailand | 1st | Triple jump | 17.02 m |
| 2007 | Asian Championships | Amman, Jordan | 2nd | Triple jump | 17.00 m |
| 2007 | World Championships | Osaka, Japan | 9th | Triple jump | 16.71 m |
| 2008 | Olympic Games | Beijing, China | 18th (q) | Triple jump | 16.88 m |
| 2009 | Universiade | Belgrade, Serbia | 1st | Long jump | 8.41 m (w) |
| 2009 | Universiade | Belgrade, Serbia | 5th | Triple jump | 16.75 m |
| 2009 | World Championships | Berlin, Germany | 15th (q) | Long jump | 7.99 m |
| 2009 | World Championships | Berlin, Germany | 24th (q) | Triple jump | 16.58 m |
| 2009 | Asian Championships | Guangzhou, China | 4th | Long jump | 7.93 m |
| 2010 | Asian Games | Guangzhou, China | 1st | Long jump | 8.11 m |
| 2010 | Asian Games | Guangzhou, China | 5th | Triple jump | 16.56 m |
| 2011 | World Championships | Daegu, South Korea | 11th (q) | Long jump | 8.02 m |
| 2011 | World Championships | Daegu, South Korea | – | Triple jump | NM |
| 2012 | Olympic Games | London, United Kingdom | 22nd (q) | Triple jump | 16.22 m |
| 2014 | Asian Games | Incheon, South Korea | 2nd | Long jump | 7.90 m |
| 2014 | Asian Games | Incheon, South Korea | 3rd | Triple jump | 16.93 m |
| 2015 | Asian Championships | Wuhan, China | 1st | Triple jump | 16.86 m |
| 2015 | World Championships | Beijing, China | 14th (q) | Triple jump | 16.72 m |
| 2016 | Olympic Games | Rio de Janeiro, Brazil | 14th (q) | Long jump | 7.82 m |
| 2016 | Olympic Games | Rio de Janeiro, Brazil | 27th (q) | Triple jump | 16.36 m |
| 2017 | World Championships | London, United Kingdom | 16th (q) | Long jump | 7.85 m |
| 2018 | Asian Games | Jakarta, Indonesia | 8th | Long jump | 7.65 m |

== Personal best ==
- Triple jump - 17.10 m (2009) NR
- Long jump - 8.20 m (2009) NR
