= Zhang Xiaoyi =

Chinese long jumper

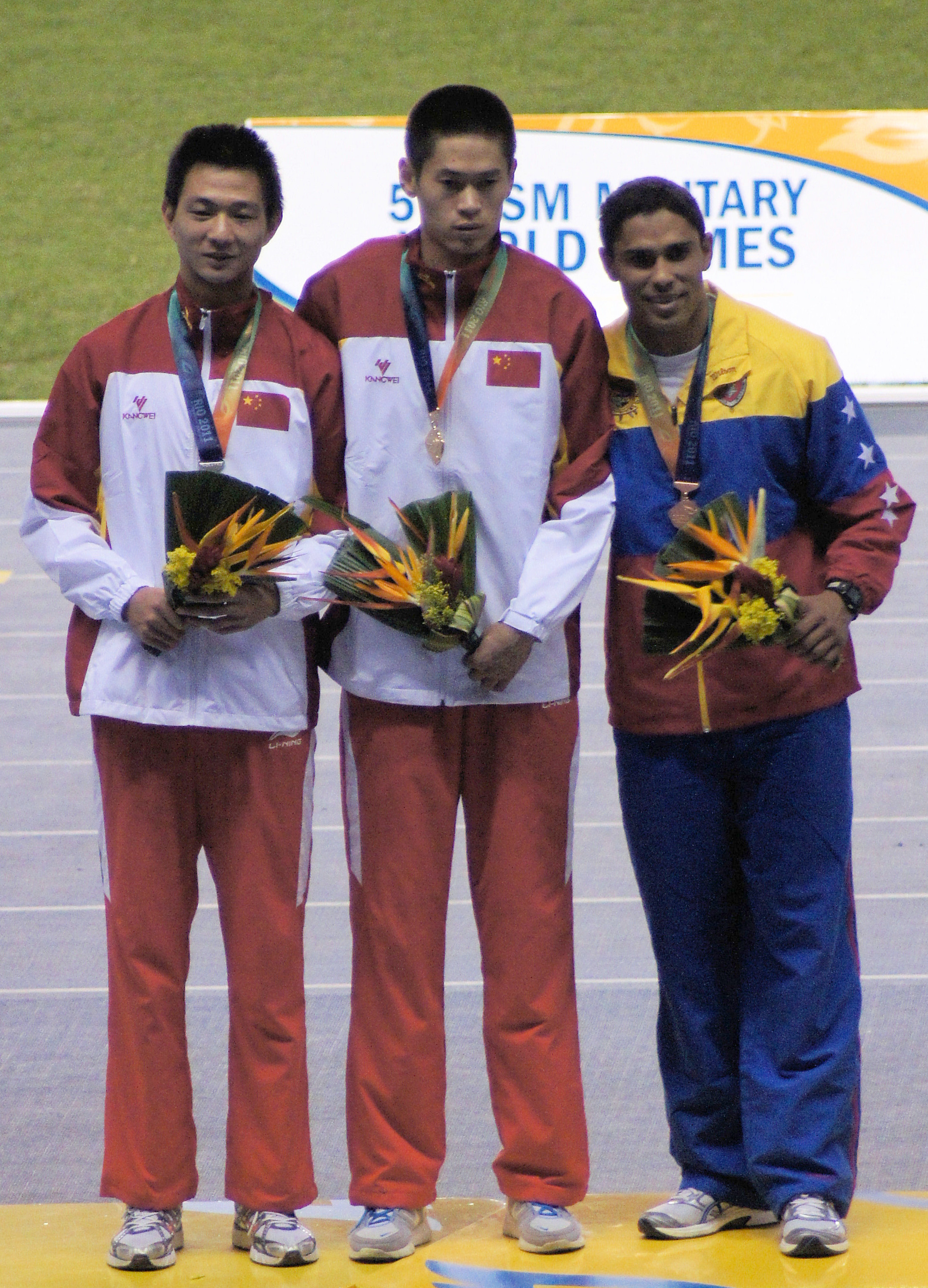
- Zhang (left) at the 2011 Military World Games

Personal information
- Born: 25 May 1989 (age 37) Changzhou, China
- Height: 1.87 m (6 ft 1 1/2 in)
- Weight: 66 kg (146 lb)

Sport
- Country: China
- Sport: Athletics
- Event: Long jump
- Club: People's Liberation Army

Achievements and titles
- Personal best: 8.27 m (2009)
- Updated on 15 August 2012

Zhang Xiaoyi (Chinese: 张晓一, born 25 May 1989) is a Chinese long jumper. In April 2006 he jumped 8.17 metres in Chongqing, a new Chinese junior record. At the 2006 World Junior Championships held in his home country he won the bronze medal with a 7.86 metres jump. Towards the end of the season he finished fourth at the Asian Games, this time with 7.78 metres.

In June 2007 he confirmed his form with an 8.09 m jump in Suzhou.

== Achievements ==
Year	Competition	Venue	Position	Notes
Representing China
2006	Asian Junior Championships	Macau, China	1st	7.78 m
2006	World Junior Championships	Beijing, China	3rd	7.86 m (wind: +0.3 m/s)
2006	Asian Games	Doha, Qatar	4th	7.78 m
2007	World Championships	Osaka, Japan	22nd (q)	7.74 m
2011	Military World Games	Rio de Janeiro, Brazil	2nd	7.90 m
2012	Asian Indoor Championships	Hangzhou, China	5th	7.51 m
2012	Olympic Games	London, United Kingdom	36th (q)	7.25 m
2013	East Asian Games	Tianjin, China	5th	7.56 m
