= Al-Waleed Abdulla =

Qatari sprinter

Personal information
- Nationality: Qatari
- Born: 5 July 1984 (age 42)

Sport
- Sport: Running
Medal record
Men's athletics
Representing Qatar
Asian Games
Bronze medal – third place	2002 Busan	Long Jump
Asian Championships
Silver medal – second place	2007 Amman	200 m
Silver medal – second place	2007 Amman	4×100 m
Bronze medal – third place	2007 Amman	100 m

Al-Waleed Ibrahim Abdulla (Arabic: الوليد ابراهيم عبدالله), born 5 July 1984) is a Qatari sprinter who specializes in the 100 metres.
