= Lin Ching-hsuan (athlete) =

Taiwanese long jumper

Lin Ching-hsuan (Chinese: 林靖軒; pinyin: Lín Jìngxuān; born 14 May 1992 in Taoyuan) is a Taiwanese long jumper. He competed in the long jump event at the 2012 Summer Olympics. He represented his country at the 2010 Asian Games, 2011 Asian Athletics Championships, and the 2011 World Championships in Athletics.

At age category level, he was a long jump finalist at the 2009 World Youth Championships in Athletics and the 2010 World Junior Championships in Athletics, placing seventh at the latter competition. He won his first international medal, a gold, at the 2010 Asian Junior Athletics Championships.
