= Chao Chih-chien =

Taiwanese long jumper

Chao Chih-Chen
Personal information
- Nationality: Taiwanese
- Born: 13 September 1983 (age 42)
- Height: 1.70 m (5 ft 7 in)
- Weight: 64 kg (141 lb)

Sport
- Sport: Track and field
- Event: Long Jump

Achievements and titles
- Personal best: 7.95 m (26 ft)
Medal record
2007 Summer Universiade
Silver medal – second place	2007 Bangkok	Long Jump

Chao Chih-chien (born 13 September 1983) is a track and field athlete from Chinese Taipei who competes in the long jump at international level. He has a personal best of 7.95 metres.

He won the silver medal at the 2007 World Student Games. He represented his country at the 2006 Asian Games and the 2009 Asian Athletics Championships.
