= Ahmed Faiz (athlete) =

Saudi Arabian long jumper (born 1979)

Medal record

Men's athletics

Representing Saudi Arabia

Asian Championships
Gold medal – first place	2005 Incheon	Long jump

Ahmed Faiz Bin Marzouq (Arabic: أحمد فايز بن مرزوق) (born 6 September 1979) is a Saudi Arabian long jumper. His personal best jump is 8.39 metres, achieved in August 2006 in Lemgo.

== Career ==
He won the bronze medal at the 2006 Asian Games and finished eighth at the 2007 World Championships. He won the long jump gold medal at the 2009 Asian Indoor Games, setting a Games record mark of 7.96 m.

He was banned for two years in June 2010 after failing a doping test due to amphetamine use.

== See also ==
- List of doping cases in athletics
