= Hussein Al-Sabee =

Saudi Arabian long jumper (born 1979)

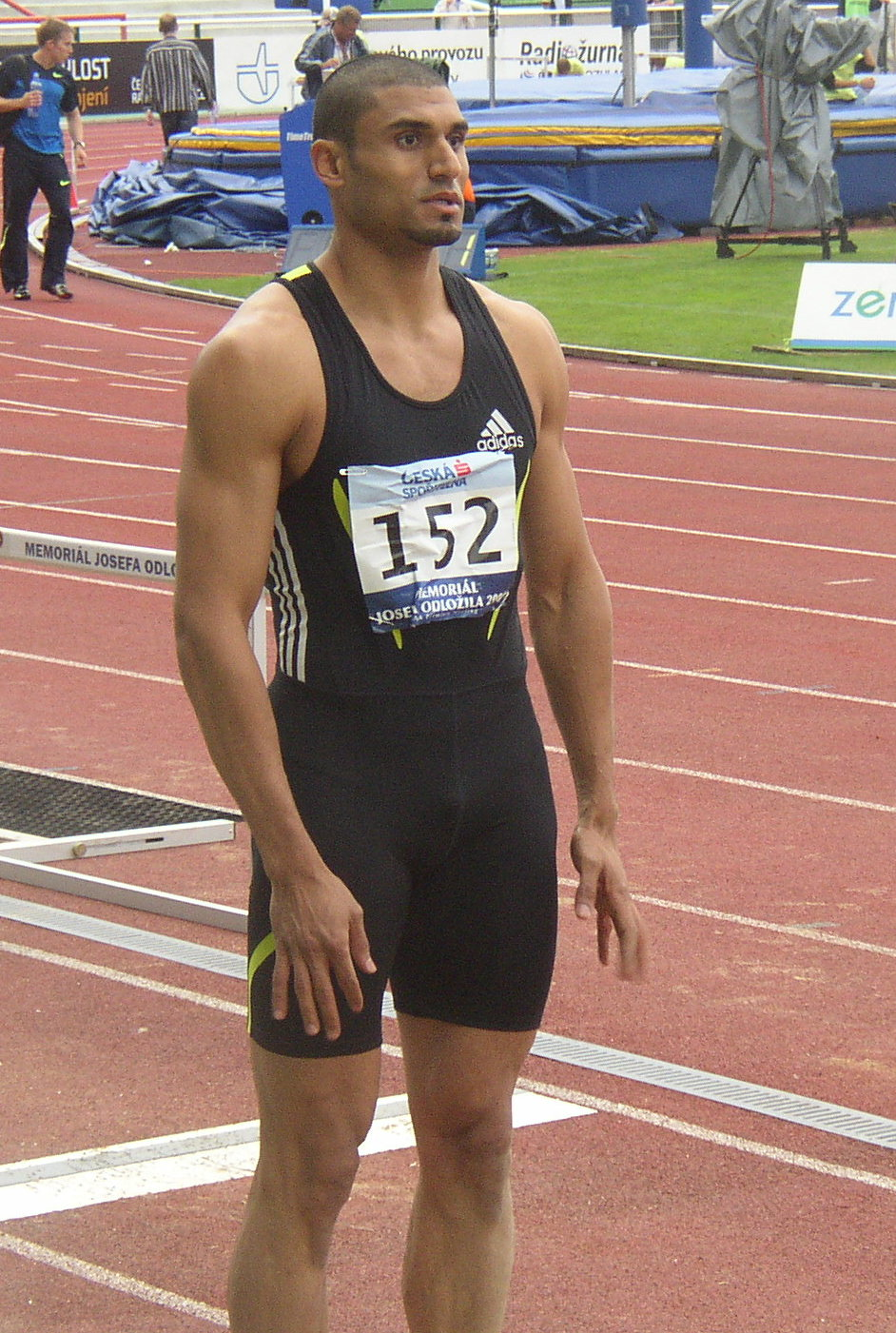
- Hussein Al-Sabee at 2008 Odložil Memorial in Prague

Medal record

Men's athletics

Representing Saudi Arabia

Asian Championships
Gold medal – first place	2000 Jakarta	Long jump
Gold medal – first place	2002 Colombo	Long jump
Gold medal – first place	2003 Manila	Long jump

Asian Indoor Championships
Bronze medal – third place	2008 Doha	Long jump

Hussein Taher Al-Sabee (Arabic: حسين طاهر السبع) (born 14 November 1979 in Qatif) is a Saudi Arabian long jumper. His personal best is 8.35 metres, achieved in May 2004 in Modesto, California.

== Achievements ==
Year	Competition	Venue	Position	Notes
Representing Saudi Arabia
1999	World Championships	Seville, Spain	12th	7.62 m
2000	Asian Championships	Jakarta, Indonesia	1st	8.33 m (CR)
2000	Olympic Games	Sydney, Australia	18th (q)	7.94 m
2001	World Indoor Championships	Lisbon, Portugal	11th	7.53 m
2001	World Championships	Edmonton, Canada	10th	7.90 m
2002	Asian Championships	Colombo, Sri Lanka	1st	8.09 m
2002	World Cup	Madrid, Spain	4th	7.92 m
2002	Asian Games	Busan, South Korea	1st	8.14 m
2003	World Championships	Paris, France	5th	8.10 m
2003	World Athletics Final	Monte Carlo, Monaco	2nd	8.30 m
2003	Asian Championships	Manila, Philippines	1st	8.23 m
2006	Asian Games	Doha, Qatar	1st	8.02 m
2007	World Championships	Osaka, Japan	11th	7.84 m
2007	Asian Indoor Games	Macau	1st	7.93 m
2007	Pan Arab Games	Cairo, Egypt	2nd	7.98 m
2008	Asian Indoor Championships	Doha, Qatar	3rd	7.72 m
2008	World Indoor Championships	Valencia, Spain	12th (q)	7.74 m
2008	Olympic Games	Beijing, China	11th	7.80 m
2009	World Championships	Berlin, Germany	16th (q)	7.99 m
2009	Asian Championships	Hanoi, Vietnam	4th	7.68 m
2009	Asian Championships	Guangzhou, China	2nd	7.96 m
2010	World Indoor Championships	Doha, Qatar	21st (q)	7.56 m
2010	West Asian Championships	Aleppo, Syria	2nd	7.91 m
2010	Asian Games	Guangzhou, China	3rd	7.96 m
2011	Pan Arab Games	Doha, Qatar	3rd	7.59 m
2013	Asian Championships	Pune, India	15th (q)	7.24 m
