= Mohammed Al-Khuwalidi =

Saudi Arabian long jumper (born 1981)

Medal record

Men's athletics

Representing Saudi Arabia

Asian Championships
Gold medal – first place	2007 Amman	Long jump

Asian Indoor Championships
Gold medal – first place	2004 Tehran	Long jump
Gold medal – first place	2008 Doha	Long jump

Mohamed Salman Al-Khuwalidi (Arabic: محمد الخويلدي; born 19 June 1981 in Dhahran) is a Saudi Arabian long jumper. His personal best jump, 8.48 metres, achieved in July 2006 in Sotteville-lès-Rouen, France. is also the current Asian record.

At the global level, he competed at the 2008 Summer Olympics and 2010 Asian Games, won bronze medals at the IAAF World Cup and IAAF World Indoor Championships, and represented Saudi Arabia at the World Championships in Athletics in 2007 and 2009. He is a three-time Asian champion, having won at the Asian Indoor Athletics Championships in 2004 and 2008, as well as the 2007 Asian Athletics Championships.

He is coached by Messaoud Bouhouche.

== International competitions ==
Year	Competition	Venue	Position	Notes
Representing Saudi Arabia
2002	West Asian Games	Kuwait City, Kuwait	4th	7.55 m
2002	Asian Championships	Colombo, Sri Lanka	–	NM
2003	Asian Championships	Manila, Philippines	9th	7.63 m
2004	Asian Indoor Championships	Tehran, Iran	1st	7.94 m
2004	World Indoor Championships	Budapest, Hungary	14th (q)	7.80 m
2004	Pan Arab Games	Algiers, Algeria	2nd	7.79 m
2005	Islamic Solidarity Games	Mecca, Saudi Arabia	1st	8.44 m
2006	World Athletics Final	Stuttgart, Germany	2nd	8.34 m
2006	World Cup	Athens, Greece	3rd	8.11 m
2007	Asian Championships	Amman, Jordan	1st	8.16 m (w)
2007	World Championships	Osaka, Japan	18th (q)	7.85 m
2007	Pan Arab Games	Cairo, Egypt	1st	8.19 m
2008	Asian Indoor Championships	Doha, Qatar	1st	8.24 m (iAR)
2008	World Indoor Championships	Valencia, Spain	3rd	8.01 m
2008	Olympic Games	Beijing, China	14th (q)	7.93 m
2009	World Championships	Berlin, Germany	36th (q)	7.66 m
2010	West Asian Championships	Aleppo, Syria	1st	8.00 m
2010	Asian Games	Guangzhou, China	11th	6.78 m
2016	Asian Indoor Championships	Doha, Qatar	8th	7.52 m
