= 2019 Asian Athletics Championships – Men's triple jump =

Men's triple jump at the 2019 Asian Athletics Championships
- Venue: Khalifa International Stadium
- Location: Doha, Qatar
- Dates: 21 April (qualification); 22 April (final)
- Competitors: 16 from 12 nations
- Winning distance: 16.93 m

Medalists
gold medal	Rulsan Kurbanov	Uzbekistan
silver medal	Zhu Yaming	China
bronze medal	Xu Xiaolong	China

The men's triple jump at the 2019 Asian Athletics Championships was held on 21 and 22 April.

== Records ==
Records before the 2019 Asian Athletics Championships
Record	Athlete (nation)	Distance (m)	Location	Date
World record	Jonathan Edwards (GBR)	18.29	Gothenburg, Sweden	7 August 1995
Asian record	Li Yanxi (CHN)	17.59	Jinan, China	26 October 2009
Championship record	Chen Yanping (CHN)	17.22	Kuala Lumpur, Malaysia	23 October 1991
World leading	Omar Craddock (USA)	17.68	Long Beach, United States	20 April 2019
Asian leading	Zhu Yaming (CHN)	17.35	Nanjing, China	20 February 2019

== Results ==
=== Qualification ===
Qualification rule: Qualifying performance 16.50 (Q) or at least 12 best performers (q) qualify for the final

Rank	Group	Name	Nationality	#1	#2	#3	Result	Notes
1	A	Zhu Yaming	China	16.52			16.52	Q, SB
2	B	Xu Xiaolong	China	16.35	x	–	16.35	q
3	B	Rulsan Kurbanov	Uzbekistan	16.12	16.29	–	16.29	q, SB
4	A	Mark Harry Diones	Philippines	x	15.84	16.16	16.16	q, SB
5	B	Muhammad Hakimi Ismail	Malaysia	x	14.85	16.08	16.08	q
6	A	Ryoma Yamamoto	Japan	15.10	15.97	–	15.97	q
7	A	Shreshan Dhananjaya Liyanapedige	Sri Lanka	15.66	15.87	15.51	15.87	q
8	B	Kohei Yamashita	Japan	15.78	15.32	–	15.78	q
9	B	Praveen Chithravel	India	x	15.29	15.66	15.66	q
10	A	Ivan Denisov	Uzbekistan	15.18	x	15.47	15.47	q, SB
11	A	Pratchaya Tepparak	Thailand	x	x	15.36	15.36	q
12	A	Salam Al-Rawahi	Oman	14.75	15.31	15.27	15.31	q, PB
13	B	Wong Chun Wing	Hong Kong	14.55	14.73	14.45	14.73	
14	B	Supot Boonnun	Thailand	13.91	x	14.62	14.62	
15	A	Khaled Al-Subaie	Kuwait	x	x	14.59	14.59	SB
	A	Che Long Kin	Macau	x	x	–	NM	
	B	Mohammad Amin Al-Salami	Syria				DNS	

=== Final ===
Rank	Name	Nationality	#1	#2	#3	#4	#5	#6	Result	Notes
1st place, gold medalist(s)	Rulsan Kurbanov	Uzbekistan	16.86	16.93	16.67	x	16.76	x	16.93	PB
2nd place, silver medalist(s)	Zhu Yaming	China	16.52w	16.87w	x	x	16.50	16.78	16.87	SB
3rd place, bronze medalist(s)	Xu Xiaolong	China	16.42	16.65	x	15.88	16.27	16.81	16.81	
4	Pratchaya Tepparak	Thailand	15.49w	15.96	x	x	16.27	16.13	16.27	SB
5	Mark Harry Diones	Philippines	15.94	16.24	x	15.72	15.96	15.85	16.24	SB
6	Shreshan Dhananjaya Liyanapedige	Sri Lanka	15.41	x	16.03	16.16	16.01	13.85	16.16	
7	Ryoma Yamamoto	Japan	x	16.04	x	x	–	15.58	16.04	
8	Muhammad Hakimi Ismail	Malaysia	15.56	15.83	x	x	14.13	x	15.83	
9	Ivan Denisov	Uzbekistan	15.57	15.76	15.71w				15.76	SB
10	Kohei Yamashita	Japan	15.08	14.60	x				15.08	
11	Salam Al-Rawahi	Oman	13.63	14.99	14.98				14.99	
	Praveen Chithravel	India	x	–	r				NM	
