= Athletics at the 2017 SEA Games – Men's Results =

The men's athletics competitions at the 2017 SEA Games in Kuala Lumpur took place at Bukit Jalil National Stadium in Kuala Lumpur.

The 2017 Games featured competitions in 23 events (12 track, 2 road, 8 field and 1 combined).

== 100 metres ==
Athletics – Men's 100m at the 2017 SEA Games
- Venue: Bukit Jalil National Stadium, Kuala Lumpur
- Date: 22 August 2017 (Heats & Final)
- Competitors: 15 from 8 nations

Medalists
gold medal	Khairul Hafiz Jantan	Malaysia
silver medal	Eric Shauwn Cray	Philippines
bronze medal	Kritsada Namsuwun	Thailand

=== Records ===
Prior to this competition, the existing Asian and SEA Games records were as follows:

AR	Femi Ogunode (QAT)	9.91	Wuhan, China	4 June 2015
GR	Suryo Agung Wibowo (INA)	10.17	Vientiane, Laos	13 December 2009

=== Results ===
Green denotes finalists. Wind: Heat 1 +0.7 m/s, Heat 2 +0.3 m/s, Final 0.0 m/s

Rank	Athlete	Heat 1			Heat 2			Final	
Rank	Athlete	Lane	Time	Rank	Lane	Time	Rank	Lane	Time
1st place, gold medalist(s)	Khairul Hafiz Jantan (MAS)	—	—	—	6	10.34	1	6	10.38
2nd place, silver medalist(s)	Eric Shauwn Cray (PHI)	5	10.58	1	—	—	—	5	10.425
3rd place, bronze medalist(s)	Kritsada Namsuwun (THA)	6	10.63	3	—	—	—	8	10.428
4	Jirapong Meenapra (THA)	—	—	—	4	10.46	2	7	10.64
5	Jonathan Nyepa (MAS)	8	10.60	2	—	—	—	4	10.66
6	Yaspi Boby (INA)	7	10.65	4	—	—	—	3	10.67
7	Iswandi (INA)	—	—	—	5	10.56	3	9	10.72
8	Calvin Kang Li Loong (SGP)	4	10.66	5	—	—	—	2	10.74
9	Anfernee Lopena (PHI)	—	—	—	7	10.71	4	did not advance	
10	Mohamed Fakhri Ismail (BRU)	—	—	—	8	10.75	5	did not advance	
11	Timothee Yap Jin Wei (SGP)	—	—	—	9	10.79	6	did not advance	
12	Sokong Pen (CAM)	—	—	—	3	10.96	7	did not advance	
13	Phearath Nget (CAM)	9	11.00	6	—	—	—	did not advance	
14	Md Asy Syafie (BRU)	3	11.06	7	—	—	—	did not advance	
15	Nanthavath Khentanone (LAO)	2	11.08	8	—	—	—	did not advance	

== 200 metres ==
Athletics – Men's 200m at the 2017 SEA Games
- Venue: Bukit Jalil National Stadium, Kuala Lumpur
- Date: 23 August 2017
- Competitors: 14 from 9 nations

Medalists
gold medal	Trenten Anthony Beram	Philippines
silver medal	Jirapong Meenapra	Thailand
bronze medal	Thevarr Gunasegaran	Malaysia

=== Records ===
Prior to this competition, the existing Asian and SEA Games records were as follows:

AR	Femi Ogunode (QAT)	19.97	Brussels, Belgium	11 September 2015
GR	Reanchai Seeharwong (THA)	20.69	Bandar Seri Begawan, Brunei	10 August 1999

=== Results ===
Green denotes finalists.

Rank	Athlete	Heat 1			Heat 2			Final	
Rank	Athlete	Lane	Time	Rank	Lane	Time	Rank	Lane	Time
1st place, gold medalist(s)	Trenten Anthony Beram (PHI)	—	—	—	5	20.99	1	6	20.84
2nd place, silver medalist(s)	Jirapong Meenapra (THA)	—	—	—	5	21.29	1	5	21.22
3rd place, bronze medalist(s)	Thevarr Gunasegaran (MAS)	7	21.42	3	—	—	—	9	21.26
4	Khairul Hafiz Jantan (MAS)	—	—	—	6	21.36	2	4	21.28
5	Mohd Noor Firdaus (BRU)	9	21.39	2	—	—	—	7	21.45
6	Siripol Punpa (THA)	—	—	—	7	21.49	3	8	21.56
7	Archand Christian (PHI)	4	21.50	4	—	—	—	2	21.74
8	I Dewa Made Mudiyasa (INA)	—	—	—	4	21.50	4	3	21.78
9	Luong Van Thao (VIE)	6	21.51	5	—	—	—	did not advance	
10	Timothee Yap Jin Wei (SGP)	8	21.87	6	—	—	—	did not advance	
11	Phearath Nget (CAM)	—	—	—	9	22.28	5	did not advance	
12	Aksonesath Lathsav (LAO)	—	—	—	3	22.32	6	did not advance	
13	Calvin Kang Li Loong (SGP)	—	—	—	8	22.38	7	did not advance	
14	Sokong Pen (CAM)	3	22.71	7	—	—	—	did not advance	

== 400 metres ==
Athletics – Men's 400m at the 2017 SEA Games
- Venue: Bukit Jalil National Stadium, Kuala Lumpur
- Date: 24 August 2017
- Competitors: 12 from 8 nations

Medalists
gold medal	Trenten Anthony Beram	Philippines
silver medal	Phitchaya Sunthonthuam	Thailand
bronze medal	Quách Công Lịch	Vietnam

=== Records ===
Prior to this competition, the existing Asian and SEA Games records were as follows:

AR	Yousef Masrahi (KSA)	43.93	Beijing, China	23 August 2015
GR	Kunanon Sukkaew (THA)	46.00	Singapore	12 June 2015

=== Results ===
Green denotes finalists.

Rank	Athlete	Heat 1			Heat 2			Final	
Rank	Athlete	Lane	Time	Rank	Lane	Time	Rank	Lane	Time
1st place, gold medalist(s)	Trenten Anthony Beram (PHI)	—	—	—	5	47.16	1	7	46.39
2nd place, silver medalist(s)	Phitchaya Sunthonthuam (THA)	4	47.63	2	—	—	—	6	46.46
3rd place, bronze medalist(s)	Quách Công Lịch (VIE)	5	47.60	1	—	—	—	4	46.48
4	Mohd Azam Masri (MAS)	—	—	—	7	47.29	2	5	47.24
5	Arif Zulhilmi Alet (MAS)	7	47.706	3	—	—	—	9	47.51
6	Luong Van Thao (VIE)	—	—	—	4	47.52	3	8	47.60
7	Edgardo Alejan (PHI)	8	47.708	4	—	—	—	3	47.68
8	Ifan Anugrah Setiawan (INA)	6	47.74	5	—	—	—	2	DQ
9	Vitsanu Phosri (THA)	—	—	—	6	48.48	4	did not advance	
10	Kingkeo Inthavong (LAO)	—	—	—	8	49.73	5	did not advance	
11	Ng Chin Hui (SGP)	9	49.84	6	—	—	—	did not advance	
12	Phearath Nget (CAM)	—	—	—	9	51.51	6	did not advance	

== 800 metres ==
Athletics – Men's 800m at the 2017 SEA Games
- Venue: Bukit Jalil National Stadium, Kuala Lumpur
- Date: 23 August 2017
- Competitors: 12 from 7 nations

Medalists
gold medal	Duong Van Thai	Vietnam
silver medal	Marco Vilog	Philippines
bronze medal	Muhammad Haqeem Mustaqim Husmadi	Malaysia

=== Records ===
Prior to this competition, the existing Asian and SEA Games records were as follows:

AR	Yusuf Saad Kamel (BHR)	1:42.79	Fontvieille, Monaco	29 July 2008
GR	Samson Vellabouy (MAS)	1:48.29	Kuala Lumpur, Malaysia	14 August 1989

=== Results ===
Green denotes finalists.

Rank	Athlete	Heat 1			Heat 2			Final	
Rank	Athlete	Lane	Time	Rank	Lane	Time	Rank	Lane	Time
1st place, gold medalist(s)	Duong Van Thai (VIE)	—	—	—	3	1:55.08	1	4	1:48.97
2nd place, silver medalist(s)	Marco Vilog (PHI)	4	1:53.28	2	—	—	—	5	1:49.91
3rd place, bronze medalist(s)	Muhammad Haqeem Mustaqim Husmadi (MAS)	3	1:52.65	1	—	—	—	6	1:50.76
4	Mervin Guarte (PHI)	—	—	—	4	1:55.19	2	7	1:51.33
5	Yothin Yaprajan (THA)	—	—	—	5	1:55.25	3	8	1:51.70
6	Jirayu Pleenaram (THA)	6	1:53.81	4	—	—	—	2	1:53.19
7	Budiman Holle (INA)	5	1:53.42	3	—	—	—	9	1:53.56
8	Vo Vu Linh (VIE)	7	1:53.83	5	—	—	—	3	1:58.03
9	Asif Rahman Jiyaudeen (MAS)	—	—	—	8	1:55.41	4	did not advance	
10	Wempy Pelamonia (INA)	—	—	—	6	1:56.54	5	did not advance	
11	Samorn Kieng (CAM)	8	1:56.83	6	—	—	—	did not advance	
12	Manuel Belo Amaral Ataide (TLS)	—	—	—	7	2:02.85	6	did not advance	

== 1500 metres ==
Athletics – Men's 1500m at the 2017 SEA Games
- Venue: Bukit Jalil National Stadium, Kuala Lumpur
- Date: 24 August 2017
- Competitors: 10 from 7 nations

Medalists
gold medal	Duong Van Thai	Vietnam
silver medal	Yothin Yaprajan	Thailand
bronze medal	Mervin Guarte	Philippines

=== Records ===
Prior to this competition, the existing Asian and SEA Games records were as follows:

AR	Rashid Ramzi (BHR)	3:29.14	Rome, Italy	14 July 2006
GR	Nguyễn Đình Cương (VIE)	3:45.31	Nakhon Ratchasima, Thailand	11 December 2007

=== Results ===
Rank	Athlete	Final	
Rank	Athlete	Lane	Time
1st place, gold medalist(s)	Duong Van Thai (VIE)	3	3:51.44
2nd place, silver medalist(s)	Yothin Yaprajan (THA)	9	3:53.41
3rd place, bronze medalist(s)	Mervin Guarte (PHI)	7	3:53.68
4	Ahmad Luth Hamizan (MAS)	1	3:56.03
5	Budiman Holle (INA)	2	3:57.35
6	Đỗ Quốc Luật (VIE)	10	3:57.70
7	Elbren Neri (PHI)	4	3:58.38
8	Muhammad Haqeem Mustaqim Husmadi (MAS)	8	4:07.05
9	Samorn Kieng (CAM)	5	4:10.37
10	Manuel Belo Amaral Ataide (TLS)	6	4:15.20

== 5000 metres ==
Athletics – Men's 5000m at the 2017 SEA Games
- Venue: Bukit Jalil National Stadium, Kuala Lumpur
- Date: 26 August 2017
- Competitors: 9 from 8 nations

Medalists
gold medal	Nguyen Van Lai	Vietnam
silver medal	Prabudass Krishnan	Malaysia
bronze medal	Agus Prayogo	Indonesia

=== Records ===
Prior to this competition, the existing Asian and SEA Games records were as follows:

AR	Albert Kibichii Rop (BHR)	12:51.96	Fontvieille, Monaco	19 July 2013
GR	Nguyen Van Lai (VIE)	14:04.82	Singapore	9 June 2015

=== Results ===
Rank	Athlete	Final	
Rank	Athlete	Lane	Time
1st place, gold medalist(s)	Nguyen Van Lai (VIE)	2	14:55.15
2nd place, silver medalist(s)	Prabudass Krishnan (MAS)	4	14:57.43
3rd place, bronze medalist(s)	Agus Prayogo (INA)	1	15:01.80
4	Sanchai Namkhet (THA)	7	15:08.20
5	Soh Rui Yong (SGP)	3	15:16.49
6	Le Van Thao (VIE)	5	15:23.25
7	Sysavath Thammavongchit (LAO)	8	15:27.06
8	San Naing (MYA)	9	15:37.35
9	Ma Viro (CAM)	6	16:22.62

== 10000 metres ==
Athletics – Men's 10000m at the 2017 SEA Games
- Venue: Bukit Jalil National Stadium, Kuala Lumpur
- Date: 25 August 2017
- Competitors: 6 from 4 nations

Medalists
gold medal	Agus Prayogo	Indonesia
silver medal	Nguyen Van Lai	Vietnam
bronze medal	Sanchai Namkhet	Thailand

=== Records ===
Prior to this competition, the existing Asian and SEA Games records were as follows:

AR	Ahmad Hassan Abdullah (QAT)	26:38.76	Brussels, Belgium	5 September 2003
GR	Eduardo Buenavista (PHI)	29:19.62	Hanoi, Vietnam	7 December 2003

=== Results ===
Rank	Athlete	Final	
Rank	Athlete	Lane	Time
1st place, gold medalist(s)	Agus Prayogo (INA)	1	30:22.26
2nd place, silver medalist(s)	Nguyen Van Lai (VIE)	5	30:45.64
3rd place, bronze medalist(s)	Sanchai Namkhet (THA)	4	30:54.86
4	Boonthung Srisung (THA)	2	31:26.03
5	Le Van Thao (VIE)	3	32:17.90
6	San Naing (MYA)	6	33:24.79

== 110 metres hurdles ==
Athletics – Men's 110m hurdles at the 2017 SEA Games
- Venue: Bukit Jalil National Stadium, Kuala Lumpur
- Date: 26 August 2017
- Competitors: 7 from 5 nations

Medalists
gold medal	Rayzam Shah	Malaysia
silver medal	Jamras Rittidet	Thailand
bronze medal	Clinton Kingsley Bautista	Philippines

=== Records ===
Prior to this competition, the existing Asian and SEA Games records were as follows:

AR	Liu Xiang (CHN)	12.88	Lausanne, Switzerland	11 July 2006
GR	Jamras Rittidet (THA)	13.69	Singapore	11 June 2015

=== Results ===
Rank	Athlete	Final	
Rank	Athlete	Lane	Time
1st place, gold medalist(s)	Syazwan Zulkifly (MAS)	5	13.83
2nd place, silver medalist(s)	Jamras Rittidet (THA)	2	14.10
3rd place, bronze medalist(s)	Clinton Kingsley Bautista (PHI)	8	14.15
4	Xaysa Anousone (LAO)	3	14.18
5	Ang Chen Xiang (SGP)	6	14.55
6	Rizzua Haizad (MAS)	7	14.59
7	Apisit Puanglamyai (THA)	4	DQ

== 400 metres hurdles ==
Athletics – Men's 400m hurdles at the 2017 SEA Games
- Venue: Bukit Jalil National Stadium, Kuala Lumpur
- Date: 22 August 2017
- Competitors: 8 from 5 nations

Medalists
gold medal	Eric Shauwn Cray	Philippines
silver medal	Quách Công Lịch	Vietnam
bronze medal	Andrian	Indonesia

=== Records ===
Prior to this competition, the existing Asian and SEA Games records were as follows:

AR	Hadi Soua'an Al-Somaily (KSA)	47.53	Sydney, Australia	27 September 2000
GR	Eric Shauwn Cray (PHI)	49.40	Singapore	10 June 2015

=== Results ===
Rank	Athlete	Final	
Rank	Athlete	Lane	Time
1st place, gold medalist(s)	Eric Shauwn Cray (PHI)	6	50.03
2nd place, silver medalist(s)	Quách Công Lịch (VIE)	7	50.05
3rd place, bronze medalist(s)	Andrian (INA)	9	51.52
4	Phan Khắc Hoàng (VIE)	5	52.30
5	Nattapong Khanom (THA)	2	52.70
6	Halomoan Edwin Binsar (INA)	8	53.16
7	Mohamed Farhan Hafsyam (MAS)	3	54.65
8	Francis Tiaga Medina (PHI)	4	DNF

== 3000 metres steeplechase ==
Athletics – Men's 3000m steeplechase at the 2017 SEA Games
- Venue: Bukit Jalil National Stadium, Kuala Lumpur
- Date: 26 August 2017
- Competitors: 9 from 5 nations

Medalists
gold medal	Atjong Tio Purwanto	Indonesia
silver medal	Pham Tien San	Vietnam
bronze medal	Đỗ Quốc Luật	Vietnam

=== Records ===
Prior to this competition, the existing Asian and SEA Games records were as follows:

AR	Saif Saaeed Shaheen (QAT)	7:53.63	Brussels, Belgium	3 September 2004
GR	Eduardo Buenavista (PHI)	8:40.77	Kuala Lumpur, Malaysia	12 December 2001

=== Results ===
Rank	Athlete	Final	
Rank	Athlete	Lane	Time
1st place, gold medalist(s)	Atjong Tio Purwanto (INA)	2	9:03.94
2nd place, silver medalist(s)	Pham Tien San (VIE)	7	9:06.31
3rd place, bronze medalist(s)	Đỗ Quốc Luật (VIE)	4	9:08.72
4	Ahmad Luth Hamizan (MAS)	1	9:09.12
5	Christopher Ulboc Jr. (PHI)	9	9:24.75
6	Elizar Gamashi (INA)	5	9:25.54
7	Camino Immuel Candol (PHI)	3	9:36.40
8	Nattawat Bunupala (THA)	6	9:43.77
9	Tanaton Graiyarat (THA)	8	10:11.46

== 4 × 100 metres relay ==
Athletics – Men's 4 × 100m relay at the 2017 SEA Games
- Venue: Bukit Jalil National Stadium, Kuala Lumpur
- Date: 25 August 2017
- Competitors: 28 from 7 nations

Medalists
gold medal	Kritsada Namsuwun; Bandit Chuangchai; Jirapong Meenapra; Jaran Sathoengram	Thailand
silver medal	Fadlin; Iswandi; Eko Rimbawan; Yaspi Boby	Indonesia
bronze medal	Anfernee Lopena; Archand Christian; Eric Shauwn Cray; Trenten Anthony Beram	Philippines

=== Records ===
Prior to this competition, the existing Asian and SEA Games records were as follows:

AR	Japan (Ryota Yamagata, Shōta Iizuka, Yoshihide Kiryū, Asuka Cambridge)	37.60	Rio de Janeiro, Brazil	19 August 2016
GR	Thailand (Wachara Sondee, Siriroj Darasuriyong, Sompote Suwannarangsri, Sittichai Suwonprateep)	38.95	Nakhon Ratchasima, Thailand	10 December 2007

=== Results ===
Rank	Athlete	Final	
Rank	Athlete	Lane	Time
1st place, gold medalist(s)	Thailand (Kritsada Namsuwun, Bandit Chuangchai, Jirapong Meenapra, Jaran Sathoengram)	6	38.90 GR
2nd place, silver medalist(s)	Indonesia (Fadlin, Iswandi, Eko Rimbawan, Yaspi Boby)	5	39.05
3rd place, bronze medalist(s)	Philippines (Anfernee Lopena, Archand Christian, Eric Shauwn Cray, Trenten Anthony Beram)	8	39.11
4	Malaysia (Haiqal Hanafi, Nixson Kennedy, Badrul Hisyam Abdul Manap, Jonathan Nyepa)	4	39.27
5	Brunei (Faaizul Abdullah, Md Asy Syafi'e, Muhammad Noor Firdaus, Mohamed Fakhri Ismail)	3	40.21
6	Singapore (Muhammad Hariz Darajit, Khairyll Amri Tumadi, Ariff Januri, Timothee Yap Jin Wei)	9	40.93
7	Laos (Nanthavath Khentanone, Athlete 2, Athlete 3, Athlete 4)	7	41.64

== 4 × 400 metres relay ==
Athletics – Men's 4 × 400m relay at the 2017 SEA Games
- Venue: Bukit Jalil National Stadium, Kuala Lumpur
- Date: 26 August 2017
- Competitors: 20 from 5 nations

Medalists
gold medal	Kunanon Sukkaew; Nattapong Kongkraphan; Jirayu Pleenaram; Phitchaya Sunthonthuam	Thailand
silver medal	Lương Văn Thao; Phan Khắc Hoàng; Trần Đình Sơn; Quách Công Lịch	Vietnam
bronze medal	Edgardo Alejan Jr. Michael Carlo del Prado; Archand Christian; Aries Toledo	Philippines

=== Records ===
Prior to this competition, the existing Asian and SEA Games records were as follows:

AR	Japan (Shigekazu Ōmori, Jun Osakada, Koji Ito, Shunji Karube)	3:00.76	Atlanta, United States	3 August 1996
GR	Thailand (Virot Sornhirun, Chanond Keanchan, Yuthana Thonglek, Aktawat Sakoolchan)	3:05.47	Chiang Mai, Thailand	15 December 1995

=== Results ===
Rank	Athlete	Final	
Rank	Athlete	Lane	Time
1st place, gold medalist(s)	Thailand (Kunanon Sukkaew, Nattapong Kongkraphan, Jirayu Pleenaram, Phitchaya Sunthonthuam)	6	3:07.25
2nd place, silver medalist(s)	Vietnam (Lương Văn Thảo, Phan Khắc Hoàng, Trần Đình Sơn, Quách Công Lịch)	7	3:07.40
3rd place, bronze medalist(s)	Philippines (Edgardo Alejan Jr., Michael Carlo del Prado, Archand Christian, Aries Toledo)	4	3:08.42
4	Malaysia (Mohd Azam Masri, Arif Zulhilmi Alet, Mohd Fairol Nazim, Badrul Hisyam Abdul Manap)	3	3:09.03
5	Singapore (Dinesh Hulbert, Thiruben Thana Rajan, Ng Chin Hui, Zubin Percy Muncherji)	5	3:15.44

== Marathon ==
Athletics – Men's marathon at the 2017 SEA Games
- Venue: Presint 3, Putrajaya
- Date: 19 August 2017
- Competitors: 15 from 9 nations

Medalists
gold medal	Soh Rui Yong	Singapore
silver medal	Agus Prayogo	Indonesia
bronze medal	Muhaizar Mohamad	Malaysia

=== Records ===
Prior to this competition, the existing Asian and SEA Games records were as follows:

AR	Toshinari Takaoka (JPN)	2:06.16	Chicago, United States	13 October 2002
GR	Eduardus Nabunome (INA)	2:20:27	Jakarta, Indonesia	19 October 1997

=== Results ===
Rank	Athlete	Final
Rank	Athlete	Time
1st place, gold medalist(s)	Soh Rui Yong (SGP)	2:29.27
2nd place, silver medalist(s)	Agus Prayogo (INA)	2:31.20
3rd place, bronze medalist(s)	Muhaizar Mohamad (MAS)	2:31.52
4	Tan Huong Leong (MAS)	2:32.12
5	Asma Bara (INA)	2:40.25
6	Kuniaki Takizaki (CAM)	2:42.22
7	Mok Ying Ren (SGP)	2:44.31
8	Bùi Thế Anh (VIE)	2:49.24
9	Sathean Tritipwanit (THA)	2:52.45
10	Vu Van Son (VIE)	2:58.39
11	Ma Viro (CAM)	3:00.18
12	Zin Min Htet (MYA)	3:06.10
13	Jeson Agravante (PHI)	DNF
14	Augusto Ramos Soares (TLS)	DNF
15	Boonthung Srisung (THA)	DNF

== 20000 metres walk (track) ==
Athletics – Men's 20000m walk (track) at the 2017 SEA Games
- Venue: Bukit Jalil National Stadium, Kuala Lumpur
- Date: 22 August 2017
- Competitors: 9 from 6 nations

Medalists
gold medal	Hendro	Indonesia
silver medal	Lo Choon Sieng	Malaysia
bronze medal	Khairil Harith Harun	Malaysia

=== Records ===
Prior to this competition, the existing Asian and SEA Games records were as follows:

AR	Toshihiko Seko (JPN)	57:48.70	Odawara, Japan	11 May 1985
GR	Narinder Singh Harbans Singh (MAS)	1:33:47.87	Bandar Seri Begawan, Brunei	11 August 1999

=== Results ===
Rank	Athlete	Final	
Rank	Athlete	Lane	Time
1st place, gold medalist(s)	Hendro (INA)	2	1:32:11.27 GR
2nd place, silver medalist(s)	Lo Choon Sieng (MAS)	4	1:32:28.95
3rd place, bronze medalist(s)	Khairil Harith Harun (MAS)	7	1:34:04.33
4	Nguyễn Thành Ngưng (VIE)	8	1:36:39.47
5	Võ Xuân Vinh (VIE)	6	1:37:49.59
6	Pyae Phyo Tun (MYA)	9	1:44:21.31
7	Kittiphong Chonduang (THA)	3	1:46:15.02
8	Edmund Sim Soon Chye (SGP)	5	1:47:30.95
9	Artib Sriwichai (THA)	1	1:48:26.79

== High jump ==
Athletics – Men's high jump at the 2017 SEA Games
- Venue: Bukit Jalil National Stadium, Kuala Lumpur
- Date: 26 August 2017
- Competitors: 9 from 6 nations

Medalists
gold medal	Nauraj Singh Randhawa	Malaysia
silver medal	Lee Hup Wei	Malaysia
bronze medal	Nguyen Thanh Nhan	Vietnam

=== Records ===
Prior to this competition, the existing Asian and SEA Games records were as follows:

AR	Mutaz Essa Barshim (QAT)	2.43	Brussels, Belgium	5 September 2014
GR	Loo Kum Zee (MAS)	2.24	Chiang Mai, Thailand	14 December 1995

=== Results ===
Rank	Athlete	1.85	1.90	1.95	2.00	2.04	2.08	2.12	2.15	2.18	2.20	2.24	2.28	Result
1st place, gold medalist(s)	Nauraj Singh Randhawa (MAS)	–	–	–	–	–	o	–	o	–	o	o	xxx	2.24 =GR
2nd place, silver medalist(s)	Lee Hup Wei (MAS)	–	–	–	–	–	o	–	o	–	o	xxo	xxx	2.24 =GR
3rd place, bronze medalist(s)	Nguyen Thanh Nhan (VIE)	–	–	–	o	o	o	o	o	o	xxx			2.18
4	Vũ Đức Anh (VIE)	–	–	–	xo	o	o	o	xxo	xo	xxx			2.18
5	Rizky Ghusyafa Pratama (INA)	–	–	o	o	o	o	o	o	xxx				2.15 =NR
6	Narongrit Ketsaeng (THA)	–	o	o	o	o	o	xxx						2.08
7	Lasangue Manuel Tacleo Jr. (PHI)	–	–	o	o	o	xxx							2.04
8	Nattapong Kaewmanee (THA)	–	o	xxo	o	xxx								2.00
9	Nasiruddin Jumari (SGP)	o	o	xxx										1.90

== Pole vault ==
Athletics – Men's pole vault at the 2017 SEA Games
- Venue: Bukit Jalil National Stadium, Kuala Lumpur
- Date: 24 August 2017
- Competitors: 6 from 4 nations

Medalists
gold medal	Porranot Purahong	Thailand
silver medal	Patsapong Amsam-Ang	Thailand
bronze medal	Iskandar Alwi	Malaysia

=== Records ===
Prior to this competition, the existing Asian and SEA Games records were as follows:

AR	Igor Potapovich (KAZ)	5.92	Stockholm, Sweden	19 February 1998
GR	Porranot Purahong (THA)	5.30	Vientiane, Laos	14 December 2009

=== Results ===
Rank	Athlete	4.80	4.90	5.00	5.10	5.20	5.25	5.30	5.35	5.45	Result
1st place, gold medalist(s)	Porranot Purahong (THA)	–	xo	–	xxo	–	o	–	xxo	xxx	5.35 GR
2nd place, silver medalist(s)	Patsapong Amsam-Ang (THA)	o	–	o	–	xo	–	xo	xxx		5.30
3rd place, bronze medalist(s)	Iskandar Alwi (MAS)	o	–	o	o	o	o	–	xxx		5.25
4	Frederick Saputra (INA)	xo	xxx								4.80
5	Teuku Tegar Abadi (INA)	xxx									–
6	Ernest John Obiena (PHI)	DNS									

== Long jump ==
Athletics – Men's long jump at the 2017 SEA Games
- Venue: Bukit Jalil National Stadium, Kuala Lumpur
- Date: 24 August 2017
- Competitors: 11 from 6 nations

Medalists
gold medal	Bui Van Dong	Vietnam
silver medal	Suwandi Wijaya	Indonesia
bronze medal	Janry Ubas	Philippines

=== Records ===
Prior to this competition, the existing Asian and SEA Games records were as follows:

AR	Mohamed Salman Al-Khuwalidi (KSA)	8.48	Sotteville, France	2 July 2006
GR	Henry Dagmil (PHI)	7.87	Nakhon Ratchasima, Thailand	10 December 2007

=== Results ===
Rank	Athlete	#1	#2	#3	#4	#5	#6	Result
1st place, gold medalist(s)	Bui Van Dong (VIE)	7.64	7.57	X	X	7.83	X	7.83
2nd place, silver medalist(s)	Suwandi Wijaya (INA)	7.27	X	7.63	7.78	X	7.58	7.78
3rd place, bronze medalist(s)	Janry Ubas (PHI)	7.55	X	7.55	7.75	7.55	7.63	7.75
4	Sutthisak Singkhon (THA)	7.27	7.44	7.49	7.52	X	7.59	7.59
5	Nguyen Tien Trong (VIE)	X	7.53	7.40	7.43	3.10	7.30	7.53
6	Supanara Sukhasvasti (THA)	7.22	X	X	7.40	7.21	X	7.40
7	Abdul Latif Romly (MAS)	7.18	7.25	7.08	7.34	5.71	X	7.34
8	Luqman Hakim Ramlan (MAS)	7.07	7.12	X	7.02	X	6.86	7.12
9	Sompong Vongphakdy (LAO)	6.79	6.71	6.89	did not advance			6.89
10	Tyler Christian Ruiz (PHI)	X	X	6.41	did not advance			6.41
11	Pouthaxay Nanhthavong (LAO)	5.93	X	5.97	did not advance			5.97

== Triple jump ==
Athletics – Men's triple jump at the 2017 SEA Games
- Venue: Bukit Jalil National Stadium, Kuala Lumpur
- Date: 23 August 2017
- Competitors: 9 from 5 nations

Medalists
gold medal	Muhammad Hakimi Ismail	Malaysia
silver medal	Mark Harry Diones	Philippines
bronze medal	Pratchaya Tepparak	Thailand

=== Records ===
Prior to this competition, the existing Asian and SEA Games records were as follows:

AR	Li Yanxi (CHN)	17.59	Jinan, China	26 October 2009
GR	Muhammad Hakimi Ismail (MAS)	16.76	Singapore	9 June 2015

=== Results ===
Rank	Athlete	#1	#2	#3	#4	#5	#6	Result
1st place, gold medalist(s)	Muhammad Hakimi Ismail (MAS)	16.45	16.67	X	16.74	X	16.77	16.77 GR
2nd place, silver medalist(s)	Mark Harry Diones (PHI)	15.42	16.07	15.82	16.63	x	14.61	16.63
3rd place, bronze medalist(s)	Pratchaya Tepparak (THA)	16.37	X	X	–	X	13.86	16.37
4	Ronne Malipay (PHI)	16.07	15.81	16.07	15.86	X	16.18	16.18
5	Nguyễn Văn Hùng (VIE)	15.92	15.71	15.57	X	16.12	16.04	16.12
6	Nik Fariezal Erman (MAS)	X	14.39	14.95	13.58	15.12	15.73	15.73
7	Varunyoo Kongnil (THA)	15.72	X	–	14.97	–	–	15.72
8	Nguyễn Tuấn Anh (VIE)	15.14	X	X	14.83	15.31	14.76	15.31
9	Pouthaxay Nanhthavong (LAO)	X	X	X				

== Shot put ==
Athletics – Men's shot put at the 2017 SEA Games
- Venue: Bukit Jalil National Stadium, Kuala Lumpur
- Date: 22 August 2017
- Competitors: 5 from 3 nations

Medalists
gold medal	Promrob Juntima	Thailand
silver medal	Thawat Khachin	Thailand
bronze medal	Muhammad Ziyad Zolkefli	Malaysia

=== Records ===
Prior to this competition, the existing Asian and SEA Games records were as follows:

AR	Sultan Abdulmajeed Al-Hebshi (KSA)	21.13	Doha, Qatar	8 May 2009
GR	Chatchawal Polyiam (THA)	17.74	Palembang, Indonesia	13 November 2011

=== Results ===
Rank	Athlete	#1	#2	#3	#4	#5	#6	Result
1st place, gold medalist(s)	Promrob Juntima (THA)	16.08	17.12	16.98	17.42	X	17.36	17.42
2nd place, silver medalist(s)	Thawat Khachin (THA)	17.03	17.15	16.99	17.15	16.95	X	17.15
3rd place, bronze medalist(s)	Muhammad Ziyad Zolkefli (MAS)	16.39	17.12	16.82	16.39	16.60	16.27	17.12
4	Adi Aliffuddin Hussin (MAS)	16.08	16.44	X	X	X	15.80	16.44
5	Wong Kai Yuen (SGP)	X	16.03	X	15.82	15.89	X	16.03

== Discus throw ==
Athletics – Men's discus throw at the 2017 SEA Games
- Venue: Bukit Jalil National Stadium, Kuala Lumpur
- Date: 22 August 2017
- Competitors: 3 from 2 nations

Medalists
gold medal	Irfan Shamshuddin	Malaysia
silver medal	Narong Benjaroon	Thailand
bronze medal	Abdul Rahman Lee	Malaysia

=== Records ===
Prior to this competition, the existing Asian and SEA Games records were as follows:

AR	Ehsan Haddadi (IRI)	69.32	Tallinn, Estonia	3 June 2008
GR	Wong Tuck Yim (SGP)	59.50	Bandar Seri Begawan, Brunei	8 August 1999

=== Results ===
Rank	Athlete	#1	#2	#3	#4	#5	#6	Result
1st place, gold medalist(s)	Irfan Shamshuddin (MAS)	55.87	X	58.36	56.30	X	57.89	58.36
2nd place, silver medalist(s)	Narong Benjaroon (THA)	48.86	X	50.54	48.76	50.65	X	50.65
3rd place, bronze medalist(s)	Abdul Rahman Lee (MAS)	X	35.41	44.80	44.24	X	41.09	44.80

== Hammer throw ==
Athletics – Men's hammer throw at the 2017 SEA Games
- Venue: Bukit Jalil National Stadium, Kuala Lumpur
- Date: 23 August 2017
- Competitors: 5 from 4 nations

Medalists
gold medal	Jackie Wong Siew Cheer	Malaysia
silver medal	Kittipong Boonmawan	Thailand
bronze medal	Arniel Ferrera	Philippines

=== Records ===
Prior to this competition, the existing Asian and SEA Games records were as follows:

AR	Koji Murofushi (JPN)	84.86	Prague, Czech Republic	29 June 2003
GR	Caleb John Stuart (PHI)	65.63	Singapore	9 June 2015

=== Results ===
Rank	Athlete	#1	#2	#3	#4	#5	#6	Result
1st place, gold medalist(s)	Jackie Wong Siew Cheer (MAS)	63.04	64.53	64.68	65.90	65.75	65.50	65.90 GR
2nd place, silver medalist(s)	Kittipong Boonmawan (THA)	61.87	64.65	X	63.84	65.49	X	65.49
3rd place, bronze medalist(s)	Arniel Ferrera (PHI)	53.96	54.08	55.49	54.74	55.68	55.94	55.94
4	Tantipong Phetchaiya (THA)	52.37	54.44	53.54	54.40	54.06	X	54.44
5	Ye Htet Aung (MYA)	48.76	49.35	49.80	X	X	X	49.80

== Javelin throw ==
Athletics – Men's javelin throw at the 2017 SEA Games
- Venue: Bukit Jalil National Stadium, Kuala Lumpur
- Date: 25 August 2017
- Competitors: 10 from 7 nations

Medalists
gold medal	Peerachat Jantra	Thailand
silver medal	Abdul Hafiz	Indonesia
bronze medal	Melvin Calano	Philippines

=== Records ===
Prior to this competition, the existing Asian and SEA Games records were as follows:

AR	Zhao Qinggang (CHN)	89.15	Incheon, South Korea	2 October 2014
GR	Peerachat Jantra (THA)	76.30	Naypyidaw, Myanmar	17 December 2013

=== Results ===
Rank	Athlete	#1	#2	#3	#4	#5	#6	Result
1st place, gold medalist(s)	Peerachat Jantra (THA)	70.05	71.49	X	X	X	X	71.49
2nd place, silver medalist(s)	Abdul Hafiz (INA)	X	59.22	63.08	69.30	64.48	66.63	69.30
3rd place, bronze medalist(s)	Melvin Calano (PHI)	65.59	X	65.70	64.19	65.94	64.32	65.94
4	Nguyen Hoai Van (VIE)	65.54	X	X	63.39	X	60.76	65.54
5	Hussadin Rodmanee (THA)	X	59.24	X	62.79	60.41	63.71	63.71
6	Kenny Gonzales (PHI)	55.37	57.85	60.69	57.85	58.99	57.23	60.69
7	Koh Thong En (SGP)	59.05	57.52	54.84	52.86	X	X	59.05
8	Pyae Phyo Aung (MYA)	55.72	57.65	52.98	55.39	X	54.35	57.65
9	Lian Thang Pui (SGP)	52.94	53.35	52.97				
10	Mohd Bakri Hamid (MAS)	49.61	–	–				

== Decathlon ==
Athletics – Men's decathlon at the 2017 SEA Games
- Venue: Bukit Jalil National Stadium, Kuala Lumpur
- Date: 22–23 August 2017
- Competitors: 6 from 4 nations

Medalists
gold medal	Aries Toledo	Philippines
silver medal	Sutthisak Singkhon	Thailand
bronze medal	Bùi Văn Sự	Vietnam

=== Records ===
Prior to this competition, the existing Asian and SEA Games records were as follows:

AR	Dmitry Karpov (KAZ)	8725 pts	Athens, Greece	23–24 August 2004
GR	Vu Van Huyen (VIE)	7558 pts	Vientiane, Laos	13–14 December 2009

=== Results ===
Key

The highest mark recorded in each event is highlighted in yellow.

Rank	Athlete	Points	100m	LJ	SP	HJ	400m	110m h	DT	PV	JT	1500m
1st place, gold medalist(s)	Aries Toledo (PHI)	7433	872; 10.95 s	893; 7.33 m	584; 11.63 m	723; 1.91 m	903; 48.13 s	856; 14.95 s	621; 37.85 m	673; 4.20 m	626; 52.55 m	682; 4:39.80
2nd place, silver medalist(s)	Sutthisak Singkhon (THA)	7411	878; 10.92 s	950; 7.56 m	729; 14.01 m	776; 1.97 m	685; 52.93 s	823; 15.22 s	693; 41.40 m	702; 4.30 m	673; 55.65 m	502; 5:10.23
3rd place, bronze medalist(s)	Bùi Văn Sự (VIE)	6737	823; 11.17 s	748; 6.72 m	530; 10.74 m	644; 1.82 m	816; 49.96 s	831; 15.15 s	527; 33.18 m	617; 4.00 m	607; 51.26 m	594; 4:54.06
4	Adisak Meebonya (THA)	4966	705; 11.73 s	552; 5.84 m	594; 11.80 m	619; 1.79 m	709; 52.37 s	742; 15.92 s	0 NM	0 NM	545; 47.05 m	500; 5:10.58
5	Nguyen Van Hue (VIE)	1441	728; 11.62 s	713; 6.57 m	0 Did not finish							
6	Mohammad Luqman (MAS)	0	0 Did not start									
