= Athletics at the 2018 Asian Games – Men's triple jump =

Men's triple jump at the 2018 Asian Games
- Venue: Gelora Bung Karno Stadium
- Date: 29 August 2018
- Competitors: 14 from 11 nations

Medalists
| gold medal | Arpinder Singh | India |
| silver medal | Ruslan Kurbanov | Uzbekistan |
| bronze medal | Cao Shuo | China |

The men's triple jump competition at the 2018 Asian Games took place on 29 August 2018 at the Gelora Bung Karno Stadium.

== Schedule ==
All times are Western Indonesia Time (UTC+07:00)

| Date | Time | Event |
|---|---|---|
| Wednesday, 29 August 2018 | 18:15 | Final |

== Records ==
Prior to this competition, the existing world, Asian and Games records were as follows.

| World Record | Jonathan Edwards (GBR) | 18.29 | Gothenburg, Sweden | 7 August 1995 |
| Asian Record | Li Yanxi (CHN) | 17.59 | Jinan, China | 26 October 2009 |
| Games Record | Zou Sixin (CHN) | 17.31 | Beijing, China | 3 October 1990 |

== Results ==
| Rank | Athlete | Attempt | | | | | | Result | Notes |
| Rank | Athlete | 1 | 2 | 3 | 4 | 5 | 6 | Result | Notes |
|---|---|---|---|---|---|---|---|---|---|
| 1st place, gold medalist(s) | Arpinder Singh (IND) | X 0.0 | 16.58; 0.0 | 16.77; 0.0 | 16.08; 0.0 | X 0.0 | X 0.0 | 16.77 | |
| 2nd place, silver medalist(s) | Ruslan Kurbanov (UZB) | 16.28; 0.0 | 15.05; 0.0 | 16.62; 0.0 | 15.99 +0.1 | 16.43; 0.0 | 16.41 +0.2 | 16.62 | |
| 3rd place, bronze medalist(s) | Cao Shuo (CHN) | X +0.2 | 16.13; 0.0 | 16.35; 0.0 | 16.28; 0.0 | X 0.0 | 16.56 +0.3 | 16.56 | |
| 4 | Kohei Yamashita (JPN) | 16.14; 0.0 | X 0.0 | 16.46 −0.2 | X +0.4 | X 0.0 | X +0.2 | 16.46 | |
| 5 | Pratchaya Tepparak (THA) | 16.26; 0.0 | 16.36; 0.0 | 16.06; 0.0 | 16.43; 0.0 | 15.97; 0.0 | 16.06; 0.0 | 16.43 | |
| 6 | Rakesh Babu (IND) | 16.21; 0.0 | 16.40; 0.0 | 16.36; 0.0 | 16.15; 0.0 | — | 16.38; 0.0 | 16.40 | |
| 7 | Hakimi Ismail (MAS) | 16.12; 0.0 | 16.15; 0.0 | X 0.0 | 16.11; 0.0 | 15.93 +0.2 | 16.07; 0.0 | 16.15 | |
| 8 | Zhu Yaming (CHN) | X 0.0 | 16.11; 0.0 | X 0.0 | — | — | X 0.0 | 16.11 | |
| 9 | Lee Kuei-lung (TPE) | 15.91; 0.0 | X 0.0 | 16.05; 0.0 | | | | 16.05 | |
| 10 | Supot Boonnun (THA) | 15.97; 0.0 | X 0.0 | X 0.0 | | | | 15.97 | |
| 11 | Rashid Al-Mannai (QAT) | 15.92; 0.0 | X 0.0 | 15.58 +0.4 | | | | 15.92 | |
| 12 | Mark Harry Diones (PHI) | X 0.0 | 15.72 +0.5 | 15.07; 0.0 | | | | 15.72 | |
| 13 | Mohamed Abbas Darwish (UAE) | 15.46 +0.3 | 15.34; 0.0 | 14.73; 0.0 | | | | 15.46 | |
| 14 | Agung Wahyudi (INA) | X 0.0 | 14.63 +0.2 | 14.31; 0.0 | | | | 14.63 | |
