= Athletics at the 2014 Asian Games – Men's triple jump =

Men's triple jump at the 2014 Asian Games
- Venue: Incheon Asiad Main Stadium
- Dates: 2 October 2014
- Competitors: 20 from 15 nations

Medalists
gold medal	Cao Shuo	China
silver medal	Dong Bin	China
bronze medal	Kim Deok-hyeon	South Korea

The men's triple jump event at the 2014 Asian Games was held at the Incheon Asiad Main Stadium, Incheon, South Korea on 2 October.

== Schedule ==
All times are Korea Standard Time (UTC+09:00)

Date	Time	Event
Thursday, 2 October 2014	18:45	Final

== Records ==
Prior to this competition, the existing world, Asian and Games records were as follows.

World Record	Jonathan Edwards (GBR)	18.29	Gothenburg, Sweden	7 August 1995
Asian Record	Li Yanxi (CHN)	17.59	Jinan, China	26 October 2009
Games Record	Zou Sixin (CHN)	17.31	Beijing, China	3 October 1990

== Results ==
Legend

- NM — No mark

Rank	Athlete	Attempt						Result	Notes
Rank	Athlete	1	2	3	4	5	6	Result	Notes
1st place, gold medalist(s)	Cao Shuo (CHN)	16.99 +0.5	X +2.0	17.30 −0.2	—	—	16.57 +1.4	17.30	
2nd place, silver medalist(s)	Dong Bin (CHN)	16.76 +0.6	X +1.3	X +0.5	X +1.0	X +1.6	16.95 +0.9	16.95	
3rd place, bronze medalist(s)	Kim Deok-hyeon (KOR)	16.34 +0.6	16.57 +2.0	16.93 +1.4	X +0.7	—	—	16.93	
4	Yevgeniy Ektov (KAZ)	X +0.5	X +1.0	16.14 +1.2	16.45 +0.9	—	16.62 +2.0	16.62	
5	Arpinder Singh (IND)	16.41 +0.1	X +1.0	X +0.9	16.13 +2.1	X +1.2	X +1.4	16.41	
6	Hakimi Ismail (MAS)	X +1.2	16.29 +1.2	X +0.8	X +1.0	16.12 +1.1	X +1.0	16.29	
7	Ruslan Kurbanov (UZB)	15.49 +0.1	15.92 −0.1	X +1.4	16.25 +1.1	X +0.3	15.80 +0.7	16.25	
8	Ryoma Yamamoto (JPN)	15.45 +0.5	15.70 +0.5	X +1.4	15.20 +0.3	15.56 +1.7	13.78 +0.6	15.70	
9	Renjith Maheshwary (IND)	15.57 +0.6	X +0.8	15.67 +1.1				15.67	
10	Khaled Al-Subaie (KUW)	X +1.5	X +1.4	15.64 +1.4				15.64	
11	Pratchaya Tepparak (THA)	X +0.7	X +1.2	15.44 −0.4				15.44	
12	Mohamed Yusuf Salman (BRN)	X +1.9	15.40 +1.0	15.13 +0.8				15.40	
13	Nguyễn Văn Hùng (VIE)	15.11 +0.4	X +1.2	X +1.0				15.11	
14	Si Kuan Wong (MAC)	14.90 +0.5	X +0.9	14.99 +1.8				14.99	
15	Hassan Dawshi (KSA)	13.34 +0.2	X +2.1	X +2.0				13.34	
—	Abdullah Al-Youhah (KUW)	X +0.4	X +1.5	X +1.2				NM	
—	Rashid Al-Mannai (QAT)	X 0.0	X +0.6	X +1.1				NM	
—	Muhannad Al-Absi (KSA)	X +0.9	X +0.4	—				NM	
—	Ng Ka Wai (HKG)	X +0.9	X +0.4	X +2.2				NM	
—	Roman Valiyev (KAZ)	X +0.3	X +1.2	X +1.8				NM	
