= 2017 Asian Athletics Championships – Men's triple jump =

The men's triple jump at the 2017 Asian Athletics Championships was held on 7 July.

== Results ==
Rank	Name	Nationality	#1	#2	#3	#4	#5	#6	Result	Notes
1st place, gold medalist(s)	Zhu Yaming	China	16.35	16.82w	14.24	x	x	15.51	16.82w	
2nd place, silver medalist(s)	Mark Harry Diones	Philippines	x	15.64	16.45	x	x	16.43	16.45	
3rd place, bronze medalist(s)	Xu Xiaolong	China	15.51	16.31	16.36	16.10	16.45	16.41	16.45	
4	Arpinder Singh	India	16.27	16.33w	x	x	x	16.11	16.33w	
5	Muhammad Hakimi Ismail	Malaysia	15.97	x	15.88	14.42	15.88	14.40	15.97	
6	Sanjaya Sandaruwan Jayasingh	Sri Lanka	15.79	x	15.85	x	15.97	15.79	15.97	
7	D. Karthik	India	15.88	15.79	15.93	15.57	15.89	15.82	15.93	
8	Roman Valiyev	Kazakhstan	15.56	15.87w	x	15.42	15.82	x	15.87w	
9	Khaled Saeed Al-Subaie	Kuwait	15.21	14.95	15.66				15.66	
10	Kim Dong-han	South Korea	15.24	15.47	15.63				15.63	

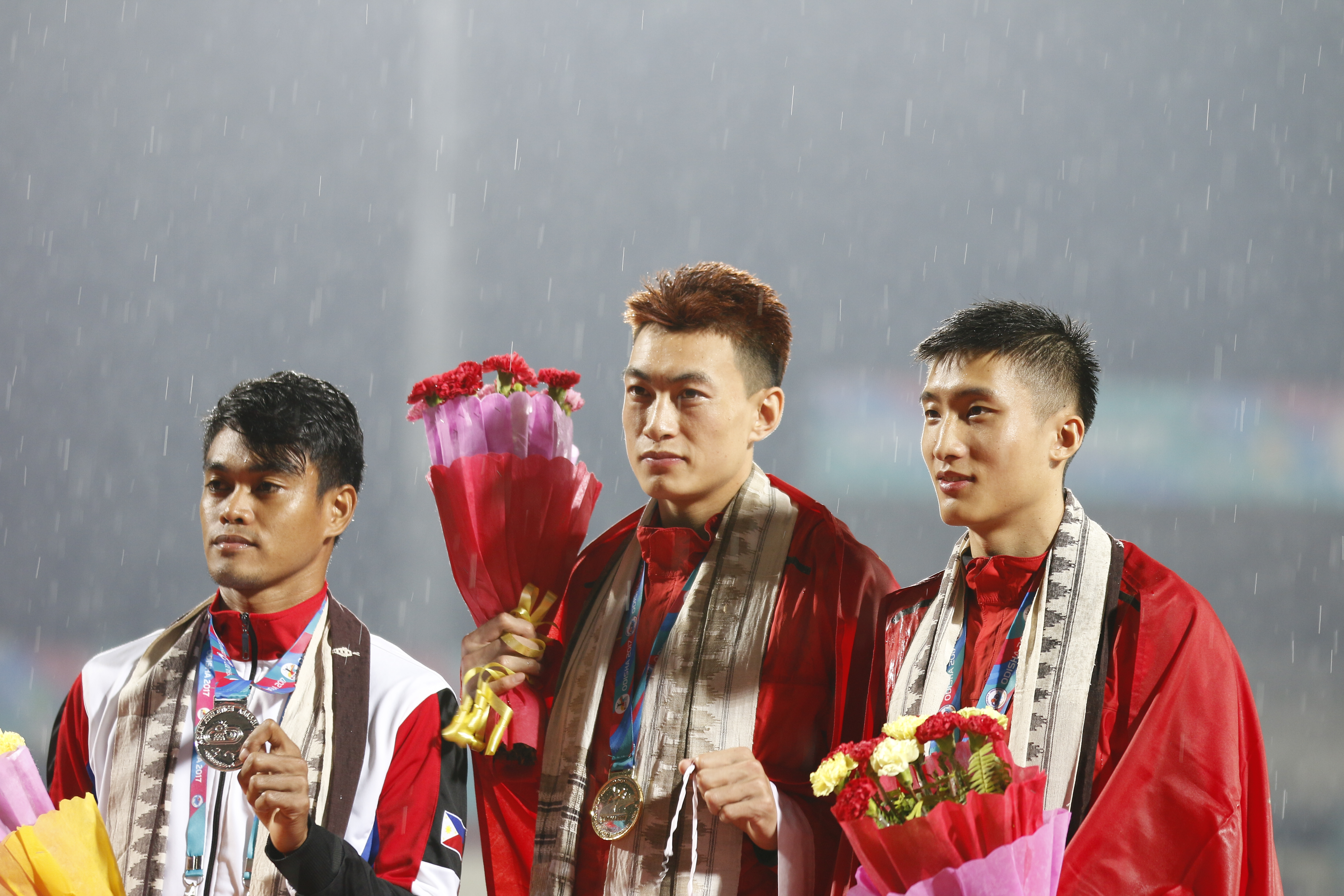
The medal winners
