= Jonathan Silva =

Jonathan Silva is the name of

- Jonathan Cristian Silva (born 1994), Argentine footballer
- Jonathan Henrique Silva (born 1991), Brazilian triple jumper
