= 2015 Asian Athletics Championships – Men's triple jump =

The men's triple jump event at the 2015 Asian Athletics Championships was held on June 6.

== Results ==
Rank	Name	Nationality	#1	#2	#3	#4	#5	#6	Result	Notes
1st place, gold medalist(s)	Kim Deok-hyeon	South Korea	x	16.48	16.86	14.56	16.23	16.79	16.86	
2nd place, silver medalist(s)	Cao Shuo	China	16.30	16.65	x	x	16.57	16.77	16.77	
3rd place, bronze medalist(s)	Roman Valiyev	Kazakhstan	x	x	16.67	x	16.59	x	16.67	
4	Dong Bin	China	16.30	x	16.47	x	x	16.65	16.65	
5	Xu Xiaolong	China	15.80	16.59	x	16.56	16.43	16.40	16.59	
6	Daigo Hasegawa	Japan	x	16.05	14.71	16.36	x	16.33	16.36	
7	Rashid Al-Mannai	Qatar	16.06	x	15.95	x	x	15.07	16.06	
8	Nassan Nasser Dawshi	Saudi Arabia	14.99	15.77	15.65	15.20	x	13.14	15.77	
9	Sung Jin-suok	South Korea	15.58	x	15.76				15.76	
10	Timur Khusnulin	Uzbekistan	15.27	15.71	x				15.71	
11	Ruslan Kurbanov	Uzbekistan	15.47	15.70	x				15.70	
12	Sanjaya Dewage	Sri Lanka	x	15.54	x				15.54	
13	Lee Kuei-Lung	Chinese Taipei	14.93	15.12	15.30				15.30	
14	Ng Ka Wai	Hong Kong	x	x	15.08				15.08	
15	Masrahi Mansour	Saudi Arabia	x	x	14.78				14.78	
