= Athletics at the 2016 Summer Olympics – Men's triple jump =

Men's triple jump at the Games of the XXXI Olympiad
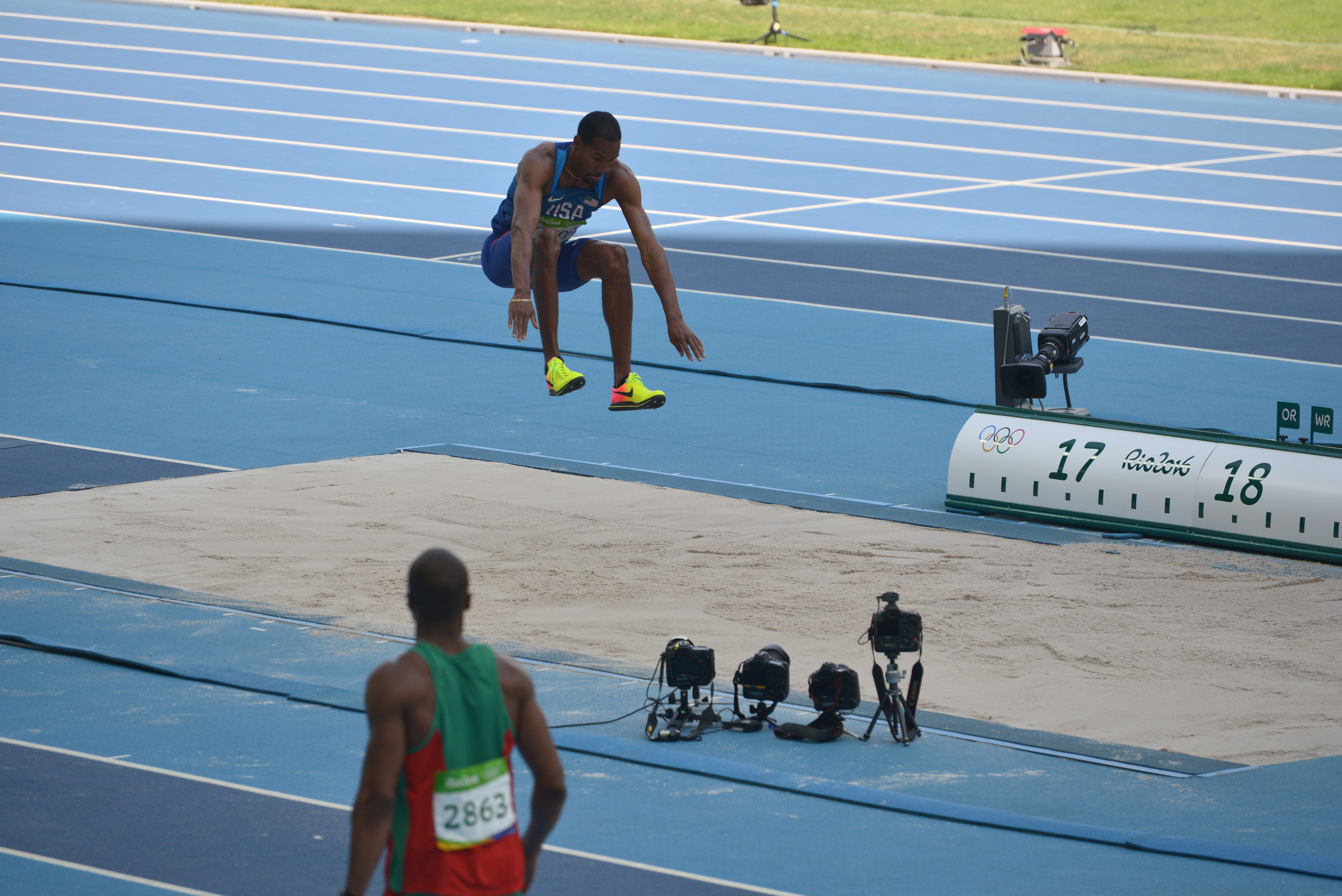
- Christian Taylor jumping
- Venue: Olympic Stadium
- Dates: 15 August 2016 (qualifying); 16 August 2016 (final)
- Competitors: 48 from 34 nations
- Winning distance: 17.86

Medalists
1st place, gold medalist(s)		Christian Taylor; United States
2nd place, silver medalist(s)		Will Claye; United States
3rd place, bronze medalist(s)		Dong Bin; China

Official Video Highlights

The men's triple jump competition at the 2016 Summer Olympics in Rio de Janeiro, Brazil. The event was held at the Olympic Stadium on 15–16 August. Forty-seven athletes from 35 nations competed. The event was won by Christian Taylor of the United States, the fifth man to successfully defend Olympic gold in the triple jump. It was the United States' eighth victory in the event. Just as in London four years earlier, Will Claye took silver; the two Americans were the 13th and 14th men to win multiple medals in the event. Dong Bin of China earned bronze, the nation's first medal in the men's triple jump.

== Background ==
This was the 28th appearance of the event, which is one of 12 athletics events to have been held at every Summer Olympics. Georgia, Guyana, and Mauritius each made their first appearance in the event. The United States competed for the 27th time, having missed only the boycotted 1980 Games.

The top entrant was Christian Taylor of the United States, who was the defending 2012 Olympic champion and the 2015 World Champion. The second best athlete of all-time, he held the season's top mark at 17.78 m. He had been beaten by Will Claye at the American Olympic Trials, who was second on the world rankings and runner-up at the previous Olympics. Cuban Pedro Pablo Pichardo (the 2015 world silver medallist and fourth best of all-time) entered but had not performed highly that year. The 2016 World Indoor Champion Dong Bin started as the fourth best on the world lists. India's Renjith Maheswary and American Chris Benard filled out the world's top five of 2016. The event had enjoyed a resurgence globally and an unusually large starting field of 48 athletes had made the qualifying grade.

== Summary ==
The qualifying round saw perhaps the most significant non-event as #4 all time Pedro Pablo Pichardo scratched. European champion and world indoor silver medalist Max Heß was also unable to qualify.

The final was barely dramatic. On the third jump of the competition, Dong Bin jumped his personal best of 17.58 m (just 1 cm less than the Asian continental record) to take the lead. Four jumpers later, Christian Taylor jumped 17.86 m (58 ft 7 in) which proved to be the gold medal winning jump. Three jumps after Taylor, Will Claye jumped a personal best 17.76 m to take over silver medal position. The 1 cm improvement moved him into the #23 position of all time. From a medal perspective, the next five rounds were unnecessary, none of the medalists improved and no other athlete seriously challenged their position. Taylor jumped 17.77m two times during those subsequent rounds, either of those jumps would have still edged Claye for the win. Taylor and Claye repeated their medals from 2012.

In the medal ceremony, the medals were presented by Austin Sealy, Barbados, IOC member, and the gifts were presented by Alberto Juantorena, Vice President of the IAAF.

== Qualification ==
A National Olympic Committee (NOC) could enter up to 3 qualified athletes in the men's triple jump event if all athletes meet the entry standard during the qualifying period. (The limit of 3 has been in place since the 1930 Olympic Congress.) The qualifying standard was 16.85 metres. The qualifying period was from 1 May 2015 to 11 July 2016. The qualifying distance standards could be obtained in various meets during the given period that have the approval of the IAAF. Only outdoor meets were accepted. NOCs could also use their universality place—each NOC could enter one male athlete regardless of time if they had no male athletes meeting the entry standard for an athletics event—in the triple jump.

== Competition format ==
The competition consisted of two rounds, qualification and final. In qualification, each athlete jumped three times (stopping early if they made the qualifying distance of 16.95 metres). At least the top twelve athletes moved on to the final; if more than twelve reached the qualifying distance, all who did so advanced. Distances were reset for the final round. Finalists jumped three times, after which the eight best jumped three more times (with the best distance of the six jumps counted).

== Records ==
Prior to the competition, the existing world and Olympic records were as follows.

World record	Jonathan Edwards (GBR)	18.29	Gothenburg, Sweden	7 August 1995
Olympic record	Kenny Harrison (USA)	18.09	Atlanta, United States	27 August 1996

2016 World leading	Christian Taylor (USA)	17.78	London, United Kingdom	22 July 2016

The following record was established during the competition:

Date	Event	Nation	Athlete	Distance	Record
16 August	Final	United States	Christian Taylor	17.86	2016 World Leading

The following national record was established during the competition:

Nation	Athlete	Round	Distance	Notes
Colombia	Jhon Murillo (COL)	Final	17.09	

== Schedule ==
All times are Brasilia Time (UTC-3)

Date	Time	Round
Monday, 15 August 2016	09:30	Qualifying
Tuesday, 16 August 2016	09:50	Final

== Results ==
=== Qualifying round ===
Qualification rule: qualification standard 16.95 m (Q) or at least best 12 qualified (q).

Rank	Group	Athlete	Nation	1	2	3	Distance	Notes
1	B	Christian Taylor	United States	17.24	—	—	17.24	Q
2	A	Dong Bin	China	17.10	—	—	17.10	Q
3	A	Will Claye	United States	16.43	16.76	17.05	17.05	Q
4	B	Nelson Évora	Portugal	16.48	16.72	16.99	16.99	Q, SB
5	A	Cao Shuo	China	16.97	—	—	16.97	Q
6	A	Troy Doris	Guyana	16.54	16.58	16.81	16.81	q
7	B	Karol Hoffmann	Poland	16.79	16.75	X	16.79	q
8	B	Jhon Murillo	Colombia	16.78	16.58	X	16.78	q
9	A	Benjamin Compaore	France	16.34	16.57	16.72	16.72	q
10	A	Alberto Álvarez	Mexico	16.50	16.67	16.60	16.67	q
11	B	Xu Xiaolong	China	X	16.35	16.65	16.65	q, SB
12	B	Lazaro Martinez	Cuba	16.38	X	16.61	16.61	q
13	B	Harold Correa	France	16.31	16.60	16.55	16.60	
14	A	Ernesto Reve	Cuba	16.13	16.16	16.58	16.58	
15	A	Max Hess	Germany	13.88	X	16.56	16.56	
16	B	Chris Benard	United States	X	16.44	16.55	16.55	
17	A	Fabrizio Donato	Italy	16.54	X	X	16.54	
18	A	Leevan Sands	Bahamas	16.47	X	16.53	16.53	
19	B	Dzmitry Platnitski	Belarus	X	16.48	16.52	16.52	
20	A	Maksim Niastsiarenka	Belarus	16.12	16.39	16.52	16.52	
21	B	Godfrey Khotso Mokoena	South Africa	15.13	16.51	16.44	16.51	
22	A	Fabian Florant	Netherlands	16.51	X	X	16.51	
23	B	Tosin Oke	Nigeria	X	16.45	16.47	16.47	
24	B	Mamadou Cherif Dia	Mali	X	16.45	16.19	16.45	SB
25	A	Nazim Babayev	Azerbaijan	X	16.38	15.60	16.38	
26	A	Rumen Dimitrov	Bulgaria	16.23	X	16.36	16.36	
27	B	Kim Deok-hyeon	South Korea	X	16.13	16.36	16.36	
28	B	Jonathan Drack	Mauritius	X	X	16.21	16.21	
29	A	Daigo Hasegawa	Japan	16.17	15.93	X	16.17	
30	B	Renjith Maheswary	India	15.80	16.13	15.99	16.13	
31	B	Pablo Torrijos	Spain	15.78	16.11	15.74	16.11	
32	A	Olu Olamigoke	Nigeria	16.10	15.95	15.64	16.10	
33	A	Clive Pullen	Jamaica	X	X	16.08	16.08	
34	B	Hugues Fabrice Zango	Burkina Faso	15.99	X	X	15.99	
35	B	Kohei Yamashita	Japan	15.71	15.46	15.66	15.71	
36	A	Levon Aghasyan	Armenia	X	15.54	X	15.54	
37	B	Artsem Bandarenka	Belarus	15.43	X	X	15.43	
38	B	Vladimir Letnicov	Moldova	X	15.29	X	15.29	
39	B	Georgi Tsonov	Bulgaria	X	X	15.20	15.20	
—	B	Latario Collie-Minns	Bahamas	X	X	X	No mark	
—	A	Yordanys Durañona	Dominica	X	X	X	No mark	
—	A	Muhammad Halim	Virgin Islands	X	X	X	No mark	
—	B	Ruslan Kurbanov	Uzbekistan	X	X	X	No mark	
—	A	Marian Oprea	Romania	X	X	X	No mark	
—	B	Şeref Osmanoğlu	Turkey	X	X	X	No mark	
—	A	Lasha Torgvaidze	Georgia	X	X	X	No mark	
—	A	Roman Valiyev	Kazakhstan	X	X	X	No mark	
—	A	Pedro Pablo Pichardo	Cuba	DNS				

=== Final ===
Rank	Athlete	Nation	1	2	3	4	5	6	Distance	Notes
1st place, gold medalist(s)	Christian Taylor	United States	17.86	17.77	X	17.77	X	X	17.86	SB
2nd place, silver medalist(s)	Will Claye	United States	17.76	X	X	17.61	X	17.55	17.76	PB
3rd place, bronze medalist(s)	Dong Bin	China	17.58	X	X	–	–	–	17.58	PB
4	Cao Shuo	China	16.78	X	16.89	X	17.13	15.27	17.13	SB
5	Jhon Murillo	Colombia	X	17.09	16.43	16.79	16.66	X	17.09	NR
6	Nelson Évora	Portugal	16.90	16.93	17.03	X	X	X	17.03	SB
7	Troy Doris	Guyana	16.88	X	16.63	X	16.90	X	16.90	
8	Lázaro Martínez	Cuba	16.68	x	x	15.89	–	15.23	16.68	
9	Alberto Álvarez	Mexico	16.26	16.56	16.47	Did not advance			16.56	
10	Benjamin Compaore	France	15.53	16.54	16.47	Did not advance			16.54	
11	Xu Xiaolong	China	16.41	X	16.29	Did not advance			16.41	
12	Karol Hoffmann	Poland	16.31	X	X	Did not advance			16.31	
