= Dmitry Sorokin =

Russian triple jumper

Dmitriy Sorokin
Personal information
- Born: 27 September 1992 (age 33) Khabarovsk, Russia

Sport
- Sport: Track and field
- Event: Triple jump
- Coached by: A. V. Tsyplakov; R. M. Lupatov

Dmitriy Andreyevich Sorokin (Дмитрий Андреевич Сорокин; born 27 September 1992 in Khabarovsk) is a Russian athlete specialising in the triple jump. He represented his country at the 2015 World Championships finishing seventh. In addition, he won the gold medal at the 2015 Summer Universiade.

His personal bests in the event are 17.29 metres outdoors (+0.2 m/s, Gwangju 2015) and 16.94 metres indoors (Moscow 2015).

== Doping ban ==
In May 2011 Sorokin tested positive for the stimulant Carphedon and was subsequently handed a 2-year ban from sports. The ban ended 26 May 2013.

== Competition record ==
Year	Competition	Venue	Position	Event	Notes
Representing Russia
2009	World Youth Championships	Brixen, Italy	13th (q)	Triple jump	14.73 m
2015	European Indoor Championships	Prague, Czech Republic	6th	Triple jump	16.65 m
2015	Universiade	Gwangju, South Korea	1st	Triple jump	17.29 m
2015	World Championships	Beijing, China	7th	Triple jump	16.99 m
2015	Military World Games	Mungyeong, South Korea	1st	Triple jump	17.01 m
Competing as Authorised Neutral Athlete
2019	World Championships	Doha, Qatar	14th (q)	Triple jump	16.86 m
