= Portugal at the 2015 World Championships in Athletics =

- WA code: POR
- National federation: Federação Portuguesa de Atletismo
- Website: www.fpatletismo.pt

in Beijing
- Competitors: 16
- Medals Ranked 32nd: Gold 0 Silver 0 Bronze 1 Total 1

World Championships in Athletics appearances
- 1980; 1983; 1987; 1991; 1993; 1995; 1997; 1999; 2001; 2003; 2005; 2007; 2009; 2011; 2013; 2015; 2017; 2019; 2022; 2023; 2025

Portugal competed at the 2015 World Championships in Athletics in Beijing, China, from 22 to 30 August 2015.

== Medalists ==
The following competitors from Portugal won medals at the Championships

| Medal | Athlete | Event | Date |
|---|---|---|---|
| Bronze | Nelson Évora | Triple jump | 27 August |

== Results ==
(q – qualified, NM – no mark, SB – season best)

=== Men ===
Track and road events

| Athlete | Event | Heat | | Semifinal | | Final | |
| Athlete | Event | Result | Rank | Result | Rank | Result | Rank |
|---|---|---|---|---|---|---|---|
| Yazaldes Nascimento | 100 metres | 10.29 | 36 | did not advance | | | |
| Hélio Gomes | 1500 metres | 3:46.32 | 38 | did not advance | | | |
| João Vieira | 20 kilometres walk | —N/a | | | | 1:25:49 | 36 |
| Sérgio Vieira | 20 kilometres walk | —N/a | | | | DNF | |
| Pedro Isidro | 50 kilometres walk | —N/a | | | | 3:55.44 PB | 21 |

Field events

| Athlete | Event | Qualification | | Final | |
| Athlete | Event | Distance | Position | Distance | Position |
|---|---|---|---|---|---|
| Nelson Évora | Triple jump | 17.01 | 5 Q | 17.52 SB | 3rd place, bronze medalist(s) |
| Tsanko Arnaudov | Shot put | 18.85 | 26 | did not advance | |

=== Women ===
Track and road events

| Athlete | Event | Heat | | Semifinal | | Final | |
| Athlete | Event | Result | Rank | Result | Rank | Result | Rank |
|---|---|---|---|---|---|---|---|
| Ana Dulce Félix | 10,000 metres | —N/a | | | | 32:26.07 | 19 |
| Sara Moreira | 10,000 metres | —N/a | | | | 32:06.14 | 12 |
| Filomena Costa | Marathon | —N/a | | | | 2:31.40 | 12 |
| Vera Santos | 20 kilometres walk | —N/a | | | | 1:34.01 | 21 |
| Ana Cabecinha | 20 kilometres walk | —N/a | | | | 1:29.29 | 4 |
| Inês Henriques | 20 kilometres walk | —N/a | | | | 1:34.47 | 23 |

Field events

| Athlete | Event | Qualification | | Final | |
| Athlete | Event | Distance | Position | Distance | Position |
|---|---|---|---|---|---|
| Patrícia Mamona | Triple jump | 13.74 | 16 | did not advance | |
| Susana Costa | Triple jump | NM | | did not advance | |
| Irina Rodrigues | Discus throw | 52.82 | 31 | did not advance | |
