= Hakimi Ismail =

Malaysian triple jumper

Muhd Hakimi Ismail
Personal information
- Full name: Muhammad Hakimi Bin Ismail
- Nationality: Malaysian
- Born: 8 April 1991 (age 35)
- Education: Universiti Putra Malaysia

Sport
- Country: Malaysia
- Sport: Track and field
- Event: Triple jump
- Updated on 30 September 2015

Muhammad Hakimi bin Ismail (born 8 April 1991) is a Malaysian male professional triple jumper. He was born in Taiping, Perak and started his early education at SMK King Edward VII, Taiping. He was one of the best athletes in his school for year 2008. He competed in the Men's triple jump event at the 2015 World Championships in Athletics and placed 27th in Beijing, China. On 9 June 2015, Hakimi won a gold medal and set a new SEA Games record with a leap of 16.76m.

His personal bests in the event are 16.76 metres outdoors (-0.2 m/s, Singapore 2015) and 16.00 metres indoors (Hangzhou 2014). Both are current national records.

== Competition record ==
Year	Competition	Venue	Position	Event	Notes
Representing Malaysia
2007	World Youth Championships	Ostrava, Czech Republic	20th (q)	Triple jump	14.56 m
2011	Asian Championships	Kobe, Japan	6th	Triple jump	15.77 m
2013	Southeast Asian Games	Naypyidaw, Myanmar	2nd	Triple jump	16.44 m
2014	Asian Indoor Championships	Hangzhou, China	4th	Triple jump	16.00 m
2014	Asian Games	Incheon, South Korea	6th	Triple jump	16.29 m
2015	Southeast Asian Games	Singapore	1st	Triple jump	16.76 m
2015	Universiade	Gwangju, South Korea	4th	Triple jump	16.59 m
2015	World Championships	Beijing, China	27th (q)	Triple jump	15.93 m
2016	Asian Indoor Championships	Doha, Qatar	6th	Triple jump	15.75 m
2017	Asian Championships	Bhubaneswar, India	5th	Triple jump	15.97 m
2017	Southeast Asian Games	Kuala Lumpur, Malaysia	1st	Triple jump	16.77 m
2018	Commonwealth Games	Gold Coast, Australia	9th	Triple jump	15.97 m
2018	Asian Games	Jakarta, Indonesia	7th	Triple jump	16.15 m
2019	Asian Championships	Doha, Qatar	8th	Triple jump	15.83 m
2019	Southeast Asian Games	New Clark City, Philippines	1st	Triple jump	16.61 m
