= Pratchaya Tepparak =

Thai triple jumper

Personal information
- Born: 1 September 1993 (age 32)
- Height: 1.75 m (5 ft 9 in)
- Weight: 67 kg (148 lb)

Sport
- Sport: Athletics
- Event: Triple jump

Pratchaya Tepparak (Thai: ปรัชญา เทพรักษ์, born 1 September 1993) is a Thai athlete specialising in the triple jump. He won a silver medal at the 2017 Asian Indoor and Martial Arts Games.

His personal bests in the event are 16.43 metres outdoors (0.0 m/s, Jakarta 2018) and 16.12 metres indoors (Ashgabat 2017). The latter is the current national record.

== Competition record ==
Year	Competition	Venue	Position	Event	Notes
Representing Thailand
2012	Asian Junior Championships	Colombo, Sri Lanka	2nd	Triple jump	16.25 m
2012	World Junior Championships	Barcelona, Spain	14th (q)	Triple jump	15.57 m
2014	Asian Games	Incheon, South Korea	11th	Triple jump	15.44 m
2015	Southeast Asian Games	Singapore	6th	Triple jump	15.52 m
2016	Asian Beach Games	Danang, Vietnam	2nd	Triple jump	15.81 m
2017	Southeast Asian Games	Kuala Lumpur, Malaysia	3rd	Triple jump	16.37 m
2017	Asian Indoor and Martial Arts Games	Ashgabat, Turkmenistan	2nd	Triple jump	16.12 m
2018	Asian Games	Jakarta, Indonesia	5th	Triple jump	16.43 m
2019	Asian Championships	Doha, Qatar	4th	Triple jump	16.27 m
2023	Asian Championships	Bangkok, Thailand	16th	Triple jump	14.72 m
