= Athletics at the 2010 South American Games – Men's 4 × 100 metre relay =

The Men's 4 × 100 m Relay event at the 2010 South American Games was held on March 22 at 18:45.

== Medalists ==
Gold	Silver	Bronze
Isidro Montoya; Luis Carlos Núñez; Álvaro Gómez; Diego Gallego; Colombia	Omar Longart; Arturo Ramírez; Álvaro Cassiani; Diego Rivas; Venezuela	Gustavo dos Santos; Rubens Quirino; Hélder Alves; Jonathan Henrique Silva; Brazil

== Records ==
Standing records prior to the 2010 South American Games
World record	Jamaica	37.10	Beijing, China	22 August 2008
World Leading	Racers Lion Track Club (JAM)	38.08	Kingston, Jamaica	27 February 2010
South American record	Brazil	37.90	Sydney, Australia	30 September 2000
South American U23 record	Brazil	39.42	Barquisimeto, Venezuela	26 June 2004

== Results ==
Results were published.

Rank	Athlete	Nationality	Reaction	Result	Notes
1st place, gold medalist(s)	Isidro Montoya; Luis Carlos Núñez; Álvaro Gómez; Diego Gallego	Colombia	0.231	39.85	
2nd place, silver medalist(s)	Omar Longart; Arturo Ramírez; Álvaro Cassiani; Diego Rivas	Venezuela	0.306	40.22	
3rd place, bronze medalist(s)	Gustavo dos Santos; Rubens Quirino; Hélder Alves; Jonathan Henrique Silva	Brazil	0.170	40.60	
4	Matías Robledo; Matías Larregle; Juan Manuel Jassid; Rubén Benítez	Argentina	0.144	40.90	
–	Sandro Corona; Franco Boccardo; Fernando Tomás Gómez; Felipe Balcazar	Chile	0.186	DNF	

== See also ==
- 2010 South American Under-23 Championships in Athletics
