= Ryoma Yamamoto =

Japanese athlete

Personal information
- Born: 14 July 1995 (age 30) Nagasaki Prefecture, Japan
- Education: Juntendo University
- Height: 1.79 m (5 ft 10 in)
- Weight: 66 kg (146 lb)

Sport
- Sport: Athletics
- Event: Triple jump

Ryoma Yamamoto (山本 凌雅, Yamamoto Ryōma; born 14 July 1995) is a Japanese athlete specialising in the triple jump. He represented his country at the 2017 World Championships without qualifying for the final.

His personal bests in the event are 16.87 metres outdoors (+1.8 m/s, Hiroshima 2017) and 15.71 metres indoors (Osaka 2014).

== International competitions ==
Representing Japan
Year	Competition	Venue	Position	Event	Notes
2014	World Junior Championships	Eugene, United States	7th	Triple jump	15.89 m
2014	Asian Games	Incheon, South Korea	8th	Triple jump	15.70 m
2017	World Championships	London, United Kingdom	29th (q)	Triple jump	16.01 m
2017	Universiade	Taipei, Taiwan	3rd	Triple jump	16.80 m
2019	Asian Championships	Doha, Qatar	7th	Triple jump	16.04 m
