= Alberto Álvarez =

Mexican triple jumper

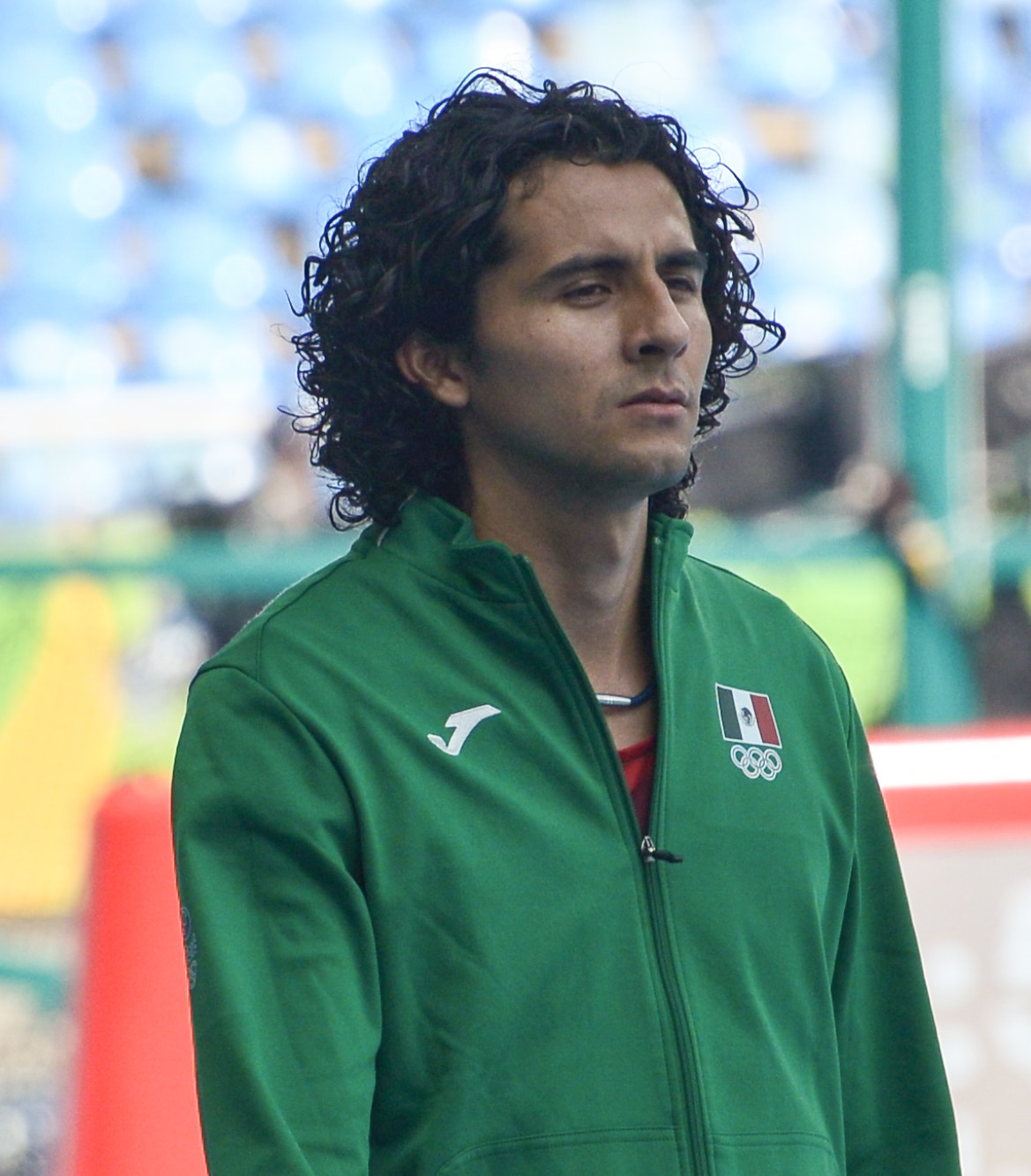
- Álvarez at the 2016 Olympics

Personal information
- Full name: Alberto Álvarez Muñoz
- Born: 8 March 1991 (age 35)
- Education: Universidad Autónoma de Nuevo León
- Height: 1.91 m (6 ft 3 in)
- Weight: 78 kg (172 lb)

Sport
- Sport: Athletics
- Events: Triple jump, long jump
- Club: Nuevo Leon State
- Coached by: Francisco Javier Olivares (technique); Gabriel Enrique German (sprint)

Achievements and titles
- Personal bests: TJ – 16.99 m (2016); LJ – 7.85 m (2013)

Alberto Álvarez Muñoz (born 8 March 1991) is a Mexican athlete who competes primarily in the triple jump. In 2016 he became the first Mexican triple jumper to compete at the Olympic Games.

== Biography ==
He is a member of the Tigres de la Universidad Autónoma de Nuevo León club.

He won two medals, one gold and one silver, beating his personal bests at the 2013 Central American and Caribbean Championships. His triple jump record is 16.63 m, achieved in Monterrey in 2014. He raised his record to 16.99 m, with a wind just under the authorized limit in Norwalk on April 16, 2016.

He placed 9th in the final of the Rio Olympics with 16.56 m.

== International competitions ==
Year	Competition	Venue	Position	Event	Notes
Representing Mexico
2010	Central American and Caribbean; Junior Championships (U20)	Santo Domingo, Dominican Republic	5th	Long jump	7.20 m
2010	Central American and Caribbean; Junior Championships (U20)	Santo Domingo, Dominican Republic	2nd	Triple jump	15.21 m
2010	World Junior Championships	Moncton, Canada	34th (q)	Long jump	6.85 m
2010	World Junior Championships	Moncton, Canada	18th (q)	Triple jump	15.24 m
2011	Pan American Games	Guadalajara, Mexico	7th	Triple jump	16.20 m
2012	Ibero-American Championships	Barquisimeto, Venezuela	8th	Triple jump	15.71 m (w)
2012	NACAC U23 Championships	Irapuato, Mexico	5th	Long jump	7.24 m
2012	NACAC U23 Championships	Irapuato, Mexico	4th	Triple jump	15.87 m
2013	Central American and Caribbean Championships	Morelia, Mexico	1st	Long jump	7.85 m
2013	Central American and Caribbean Championships	Morelia, Mexico	2nd	Triple jump	16.39 m
2014	Ibero-American Championships	São Paulo, Brazil	3rd	Triple jump	16.31 m
2014	Pan American Sports Festival	Mexico City, Mexico	6th	Triple jump	16.42 m
2014	Central American and Caribbean Games	Xalapa, Mexico	9th	Long jump	7.39 m
2014	Central American and Caribbean Games	Xalapa, Mexico	4th	Triple jump	16.32 m
2015	Universiade	Gwangju, South Korea	6th	Triple jump	16.22 m
2016	Olympic Games	Rio de Janeiro, Brazil	9th	Triple jump	16.56 m
2017	World Championships	London, United Kingdom	20th (q)	Triple jump	16.48 m
2017	Universiade	Taipei, Taiwan	26th (q)	Long jump	7.31 m
2017	Universiade	Taipei, Taiwan	4th	Triple jump	16.71 m
2018	NACAC Championships	Toronto, Canada	6th	Triple jump	15.76 m
