= Shinya Sogame =

Japanese triple jumper

Personal information
- Nationality: Japanese
- Born: 8 March 1987 (age 39) Ehime Prefecture, Japan
- Education: Hosei University
- Height: 1.80 m (5 ft 11 in)
- Weight: 68 kg (150 lb)

Sport
- Country: Japan
- Sport: Track and field
- Event: Triple jump

Achievements and titles
- Personal best: 16.59 m (Naruto 2011)

Shinya Sogame (十亀 慎也, Sogame Shinya; born 8 March 1987) is a Japanese triple jumper. He is the 2011 national champion in the event and finished fourth at the 2011 Asian Championships.

== Personal best ==
Performance	Competition	Venue	Date
16.59 m (wind: +0.5 m/s)	National Corporate Championships	Naruto, Japan	25 September 2011

== International competition ==
Year	Competition	Venue	Position	Event	Measure
Representing Japan
2011	Asian Championships	Kobe, Japan	4th	Triple jump	16.51 m (wind: +1.1 m/s)

== National title ==
- Japanese Championships
  - Triple jump: 2011
