= Roman Valiyev =

Kazakhstani triple jumper

Personal information
- Full name: Roman Gazizovich Valiyev
- Born: 27 March 1984 (age 42) Orenburg, Russian SFSR, Soviet Union
- Height: 1.92 m (6 ft 3 1/2 in)
- Weight: 78 kg (172 lb)

Sport
- Country: Kazakhstan
- Sport: Athletics
- Event: Triple jump
Medal record
Men's athletics
Representing Kazakhstan
Asian Indoor Championships
Gold medal – first place	2006 Pattaya	Triple jump
Gold medal – first place	2008 Doha	Triple jump
Gold medal – first place	2016 Doha	Triple jump
Silver medal – second place	2014 Hangzhou	Triple jump

Roman Valiyev (born 27 March 1984) is a Russian-Kazakhstani triple jumper.

He finished fourth at the 2005 Asian Championships and won the silver medal at the 2006 Asian Games. He also competed at the 2004 Olympic Games without reaching the final.

His personal best jump is 16.98 metres, achieved at the 2006 Asian Games in December 2006 in Doha. His new personal best is 17.20 m, achieved in Almaty in 2012, qualifying him for the Olympic Games in London.

== Competition record ==
Year	Competition	Venue	Position	Event	Notes
Representing Kazakhstan
2001	World Youth Championships	Debrecen, Hungary	21st (q)	Triple jump	14.41 m
2004	Olympic Games	Athens, Greece	–	Triple jump	NM
2005	Universiade	İzmir, Turkey	–	Triple jump	NM
2005	Asian Championships	Incheon, South Korea	4th	Triple jump	16.26 m
2005	Asian Indoor Games	Bangkok, Thailand	1st	Long jump	7.84 m
2005	Asian Indoor Games	Bangkok, Thailand	1st	Triple jump	16.51 m
2006	Asian Indoor Championships	Pattaya, Thailand	1st	Triple jump	16.24 m
2006	Asian Games	Doha, Qatar	2nd	Triple jump	16.98 m
2007	Asian Indoor Games	Macau	1st	Triple jump	16.57 m
2008	Asian Indoor Championships	Doha, Qatar	1st	Triple jump	16.32 m
2008	Olympic Games	Beijing, China	30th (q)	Triple jump	16.20 m
2009	Universiade	Belgrade, Serbia	8th	Triple jump	16.59 m
2009	Asian Indoor Games	Hanoi, Vietnam	1st	Triple jump	16.60 m
2009	Asian Championships	Guangzhou, China	1st	Triple jump	16.70 m
2010	Asian Indoor Championships	Tehran, Iran	3rd	Triple jump	16.25 m
2010	Asian Games	Guangzhou, China	6th	Triple jump	16.51 m
2011	Asian Championships	Kobe, Japan	3rd	Triple jump	16.62 m
2012	Asian Indoor Championships	Hangzhou, China	4th	Triple jump	16.22 m
2012	Olympic Games	London, United Kingdom	21st (q)	Triple jump	16.23 m
2013	Asian Championships	Pune, India	4th	Triple jump	16.55 m
2013	World Championships	Moscow, Russia	17th (q)	Triple jump	16.43 m
2014	Asian Indoor Championships	Hangzhou, China	2nd	Triple jump	16.16 m
2014	World Indoor Championships	Sopot, Poland	9th (q)	Triple jump	16.22 m
2014	Asian Games	Incheon, South Korea	–	Triple jump	NM
2015	Asian Championships	Wuhan, China	3rd	Triple jump	16.67 m
2015	World Championships	Beijing, China	25th (q)	Triple jump	16.04 m
2016	Asian Indoor Championships	Doha, Qatar	1st	Triple jump	16.69 m
2016	World Indoor Championships	Portland, United States	15th	Triple jump	15.54 m
2016	Olympic Games	Rio de Janeiro, Brazil	–	Triple jump	NM
2017	Asian Championships	Bhubaneswar, India	8th	Triple jump	15.87 m (w)
