= Xu Xiaolong =

Chinese triple jumper (born 1992)

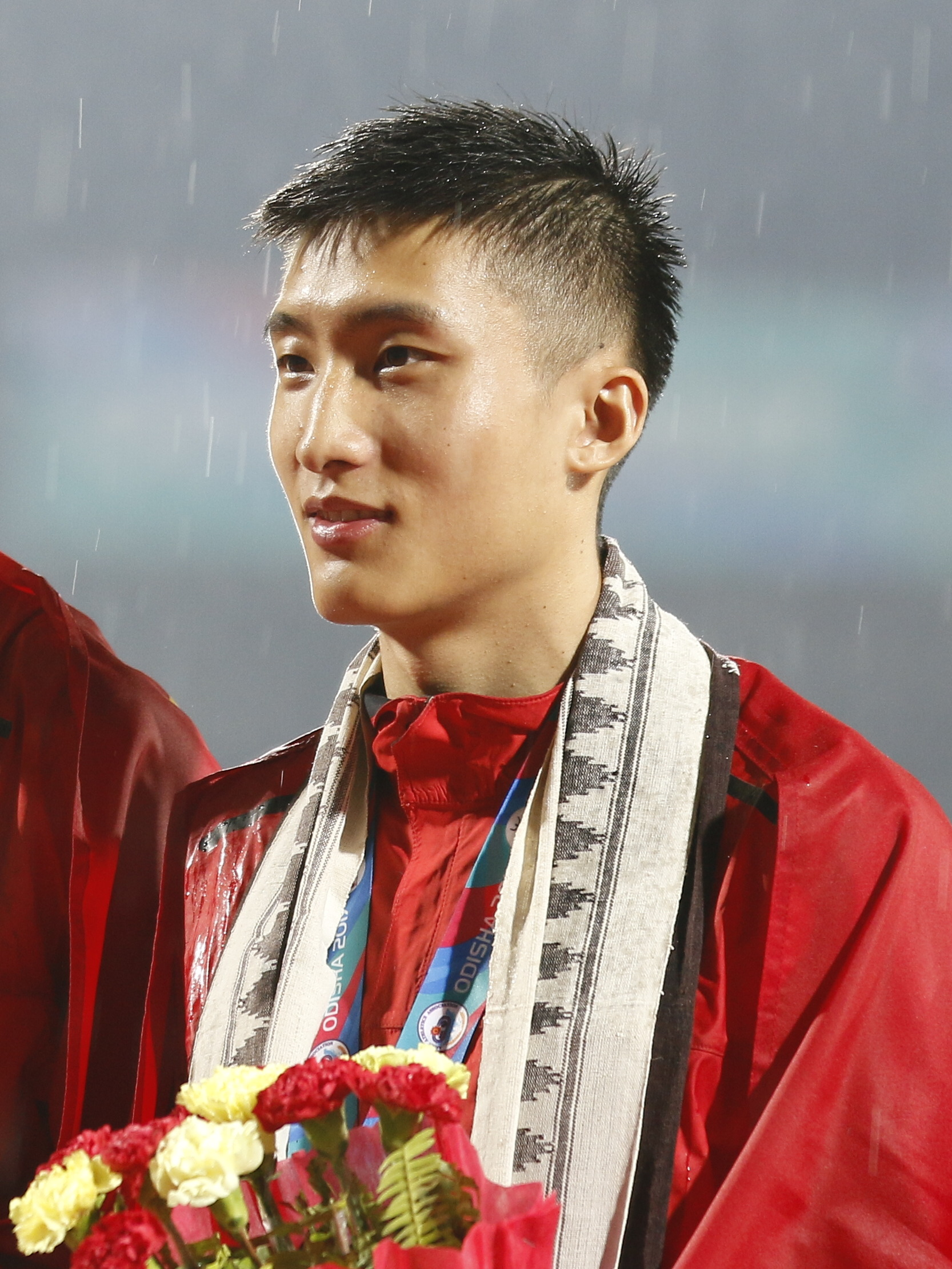

Personal information
- Full name: Xu Xiaolong
- Born: 20 December 1992 (age 33)
- Height: 1.85 m (6 ft 1 in)
- Weight: 70 kg (154 lb)

Sport
- Country: China
- Sport: Athletics
- Event: Triple jump
- College team: Zhejiang University

Achievements and titles
- Personal best: Triple jump: 16.93 (2015)
Medal record
Men's athletics
Representing China
Summer Universiade
Bronze medal – third place	2015 Gwangju	Triple jump
- Updated on 29 August 2015

Xu Xiaolong (Chinese: 徐小龙; pinyin: Xú Xiǎolóng; born 20 December 1992) is a Chinese triple jumper. He won a bronze medal at the 2015 Summer Universiade in Gwangju, South Korea, and eventually represented his nation China at the 2016 Summer Olympics, finishing eleventh in the final round of the men's triple jump.

Xu competed for the Chinese squad, alongside his teammates Cao Shuo and Dong Bin, in the men's triple jump at the 2016 Summer Olympics in Rio de Janeiro. Leading up his maiden Games, he popped an outdoor personal best of 16.93 m to surpass the IAAF Olympic entry standard (16.85) by an eight-centimetre margin at the National Grand Prix in Taiyuan. Xu managed to leap a distance of 16.41 m on his initial attempt to round out the field of twelve finalists in penultimate position, just 24 centimetres shy of his season best (16.65) that he set earlier during the qualifying phase.

== Competition record ==
Year	Competition	Venue	Position	Event	Notes
Representing China
2015	Asian Championships	Wuhan, China	5th	Triple jump	16.59 m
2015	Universiade	Gwangju, South Korea	3rd	Triple jump	16.76 m
2015	World Championships	Beijing, China	24th (q)	Triple jump	16.19 m
2016	Olympic Games	Rio de Janeiro, Brazil	11th	Triple jump	16.41 m
2019	Asian Championships	Doha, Qatar	3rd	Triple jump	16.81 m
