= 2011 Asian Athletics Championships – Men's triple jump =

The Men's triple jump event took place on July 8, 2011, at the Kobe Universiade Memorial Stadium.

== Medalists ==
Gold	Yevgeniy Ektov; Kazakhstan
Silver	Li Yanxi; China
Bronze	Roman Valiyev; Kazakhstan

== Records ==
World record	Jonathan Edwards (GBR)	18.29	Gothenburg, Sweden	7 August 1995
Asian record	Li Yanxi (CHN)	17.59	Jinan, China	26 October 2009
Championship record	Chen Yanping (CHN)	17.22	Kuala Lumpur, Malaysia	1991

== Results ==
=== Final ===
Rank	Athlete	Nationality	#1	#2	#3	#4	#5	#6	Result
1st place, gold medalist(s)	Yevgeniy Ektov	Kazakhstan	x	x	16.49	16.91	x	15.05	16.91
2nd place, silver medalist(s)	Li Yanxi	China	16.70	16.09	16.50	16.11	16.53	15.87	16.70
3rd place, bronze medalist(s)	Roman Valiyev	Kazakhstan	16.05	16.34	16.46	14.69	x	16.62	16.62
4	Shinya Sogame	Japan	16.51	13.62	x	15.91	16.17	16.00	16.51
5	Dong Bin	China	16.26	16.15	16.35	16.06	16.36	16.00	16.36
6	M.H. Ismail	Malaysia	15.60	15.07	15.45	15.76	13.59	15.77	15.77
7	Daigo Hasegawa	Japan	15.76	15.33	x	13.09	15.06	15.73	15.76
8	M.A.A. Darwish	United Arab Emirates	x	x	15.72	15.34	15.37	15.67	15.72
9	Ahmed Abdullah Faraj	Saudi Arabia	15.54	14.64	–				15.54
10	Ruslan Kurbanov	Uzbekistan	15.51	15.44	15.38				15.51
11	Yohei Kajikawa	Japan	15.37	x	15.48				15.48
12	Zafar Iqbal	Pakistan	15.20	15.30	14.97				15.30
13	M.G.M. Mohammed	Saudi Arabia	14.72	x	14.60				14.72
	Si Kuan Wong	Macau							DNS
