= Athletics at the 2017 Summer Universiade – Men's triple jump =

The men's triple jump event at the 2017 Summer Universiade was held on 23 and 25 August at the Taipei Municipal Stadium.

== Medalists ==
Gold	Silver	Bronze
Nazim Babayev; Azerbaijan	Hugues Fabrice Zango; Burkina Faso	Ryoma Yamamoto; Japan

== Results ==
=== Qualification ===
Qualification: 16.50 m (Q) or at least 12 best (q) qualified for the final.

Rank	Group	Athlete	Nationality	#1	#2	#3	Result	Notes
1	A	Ryoma Yamamoto	Japan	16.65			16.65	Q
2	A	Alberto Álvarez	Mexico	16.40	15.70	16.47	16.47	q
3	A	Nazim Babayev	Azerbaijan	16.32	16.11	–	16.32	q
4	B	Yasser Triki	Algeria	16.24	x	–	16.24	q
5	A	Hugues Fabrice Zango	Burkina Faso	15.02	16.06	16.21	16.21	q
6	A	Jean Rosa	Brazil	x	16.20	x	16.20	q
7	A	Tom Yakubov	Israel	15.67	x	16.07	16.07	q
8	B	Mateus de Sá	Brazil	15.52	15.55	16.01	16.01	q
9	A	Tomáš Veszelka	Slovakia	15.50	15.65	15.92	15.92	q
10	A	Marcel Mayack II	Cameroon	15.50	15.68	15.42	15.68	q
11	B	Tony Carodine Jr.	United States	x	15.63	x	15.63	q
12	B	Samuel Trigg	Great Britain	15.12	15.52	15.61	15.61	q
13	A	Liu Yan	China	x	15.24	15.46	15.46	
14	B	Reneilwe Aphane	South Africa	14.72	15.27	15.36	15.36	
15	B	Nam Su-hwan	South Korea	15.30	x	15.20	15.30	
16	B	Lee Kuei-lung	Chinese Taipei	x	15.20	15.24	15.24	
17	B	Jannick Bagge	Denmark	14.29	x	14.78	14.78	SB
18	B	Rogil Pablo	Philippines	x	14.54	14.35	14.54	
19	A	Dumezweni Dube	Zimbabwe	x	14.24	13.91	14.24	
20	A	Martin Brueckne Johansen	Denmark	14.01	x	13.48	14.01	
21	B	Hussain Al-Khalaf	Saudi Arabia	13.47	x	x	13.47	
22	A	Wai Seng Cheong	Macau	13.37	x	13.19	13.37	
23	B	Tam Chon Lok	Macau	13.37	x	–	13.37	
	B	Salim Saleh Al-Yarabi	Oman	x	r		NM	
	A	Ahmed Mohamed Al-Ameri	United Arab Emirates				DNS	
	B	Obrey Chabala	Zambia				DNS	

=== Final ===
Rank	Name	Nationality	#1	#2	#3	#4	#5	#6	Result	Notes
1st place, gold medalist(s)	Nazim Babayev	Azerbaijan	17.01	–	16.79	–	–	16.76	17.01	
2nd place, silver medalist(s)	Hugues Fabrice Zango	Burkina Faso	16.33	16.60	16.47	16.48	x	16.97	16.97	PB
3rd place, bronze medalist(s)	Ryoma Yamamoto	Japan	16.80	16.53	x	–	16.06	x	16.80	
4	Alberto Álvarez	Mexico	16.40	16.37	16.49	16.34	16.68	16.71	16.71	PB
5	Yasser Triki	Algeria	16.17	16.56	16.49	16.47	16.60	16.15	16.60	PB
6	Jean Rosa	Brazil	16.28	15.43	16.06	16.42	16.01	16.32	16.42	
7	Tom Yakubov	Israel	15.85	15.75	16.13	x	16.16	16.19	16.19	
8	Mateus de Sá	Brazil	15.50	15.79	15.98	x	16.08	x	16.08	
9	Tony Carodine Jr.	United States	x	15.73	x				15.73	
10	Marcel Mayack II	Cameroon	15.05	15.65	15.67				15.67	
11	Tomáš Veszelka	Slovakia	15.44	15.50	–				15.50	
12	Samuel Trigg	Great Britain	14.94	x	x				14.94	
