= Daigo Hasegawa =

Japanese triple jumper (born 1990)

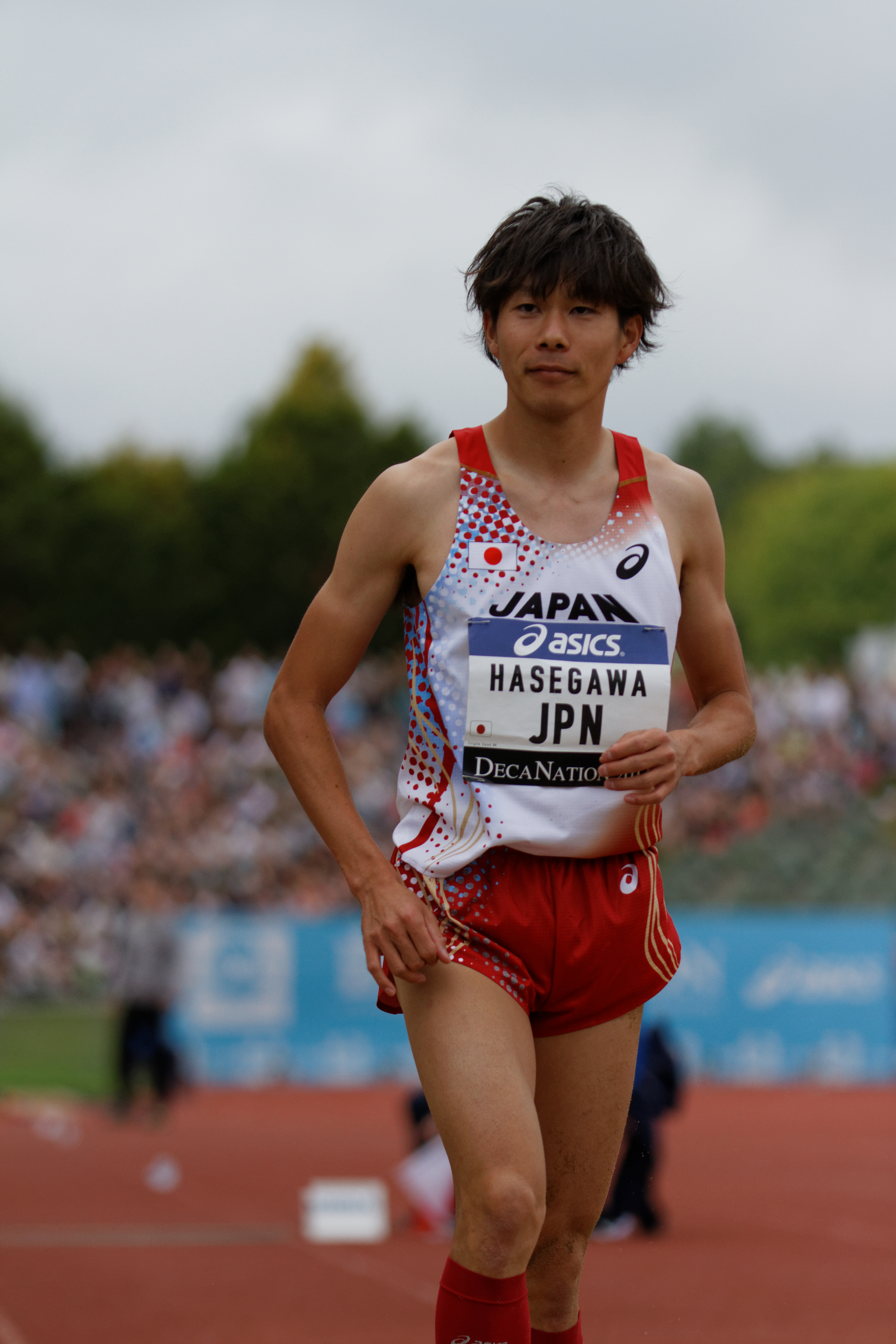
- Hasegawa at the 2014 DécaNation

Personal information
- Born: 27 February 1990 (age 36) Kanagawa Prefecture, Japan
- Height: 1.73 m (5 ft 8 in)
- Weight: 58 kg (128 lb)

Sport
- Sport: Athletics
- Event: Triple jump

Daigo Hasegawa (長谷川 大悟, Hasegawa Daigo; born 27 February 1990) is a Japanese athlete specialising in the triple jump. He represented his country at the 2016 Summer Olympics without qualifying for the final.

His personal bests in the event are 16.88 metres outdoors (+1.3 m/s, Hiroshima 2016) and 15.81 metres indoors (Hangzhou 2014).

== International competitions ==
Year	Competition	Venue	Position	Event	Notes
Representing Japan
2011	Asian Championships	Kobe, Japan	7th	Triple jump	15.76 m
2014	Asian Indoor Championships	Hangzhou, China	7th	Triple jump	15.81 m
2015	Asian Championships	Wuhan, China	6th	Triple jump	16.36 m
2016	Olympic Games	Rio de Janeiro, Brazil	29th (q)	Triple jump	16.17 m
