= Athletics at the 2015 Summer Universiade – Men's triple jump =

Men's triple jump event at the July 2015 Summer Universiade

The men's triple jump event at the 2015 Summer Universiade was held on 8 and 9 July at the Gwangju Universiade Main Stadium.

== Medalists ==
Gold	Silver	Bronze
Dmitriy Sorokin; Russia	Hugues Zango; Burkina Faso	Xu Xiaolong; China

== Results ==
=== Qualification ===
Qualification: 16.50 m (Q) or at least 12 best (q) qualified for the final.

Rank	Group	Athlete	Nationality	#1	#2	#3	Result	Notes
1	B	Dmitriy Sorokin	Russia	x	16.74		16.74	Q
2	A	Hugues Zango	Burkina Faso	16.15	x	16.59	16.59	Q, PB
3	A	Aleksey Fyodorov	Russia	16.21	–	–	16.21	q
4	A	Xu Xiaolong	China	16.17	–	–	16.17	q
5	A	Rudolph Pienaar	South Africa	15.32	16.13	–	16.13	q, SB
6	B	Muhammad Hakimi Ismail	Malaysia	13.54	15.69	15.96	15.96	q
7	A	Matthew O'Neal	United States	15.61	15.76	15.94	15.94	q
8	B	Alberto Álvarez	Mexico	15.60	15.52	15.93	15.93	q
9	A	Adrian Daianu	Romania	15.82	x	15.87	15.87	q
10	B	Mohammed Sharfudeen	India	15.27	15.48	15.75	15.75	q, SB
11	B	Roy Martínez	Venezuela	15.58	15.45	15.57	15.58	q
12	B	Jonathan Henrique Silva	Brazil	15.21	15.55	15.26	15.55	q
13	A	Igor Syunin	Estonia	15.46	x	x	15.46	SB
14	B	Reneilwe Aphane	South Africa	15.27	15.12	x	15.27	
15	A	Kaum Kamal Bento	Brazil	x	x	14.99	14.99	
16	B	Won Yu-seong	South Korea	14.82	14.81	14.73	14.82	
17	A	Marcel Mayack II	Cameroon	14.59	14.69	14.29	14.69	
18	B	Ian Paul Grech	Malta	14.54	x	x	14.54	PB
	A	Merl Hettige Don	Sri Lanka	x	x	x	NM	
	B	Mohammade Okda	Jordan	x	x	x	NM	
	A	Tshwanelo Aabobe	Botswana				DNS	
	A	Sylvester Nakeel	Kenya				DNS	

=== Final ===
Official Video

Rank	Athlete	Nationality	#1	#2	#3	#4	#5	#6	Result	Notes
1st place, gold medalist(s)	Dmitriy Sorokin	Russia	x	16.92	17.29	x	–	x	17.29	PB
2nd place, silver medalist(s)	Hugues Zango	Burkina Faso	16.60	x	16.67	16.76	x	x	16.76	PB
3rd place, bronze medalist(s)	Xu Xiaolong	China	16.14	16.03	16.76	x	x	–	16.76	
4	Muhammad Hakimi Ismail	Malaysia	15.96	16.27	16.37	x	16.59	16.35	16.59	
5	Aleksey Fyodorov	Russia	16.04	16.35	16.18	x	16.21	x	16.35	
6	Alberto Álvarez	Mexico	16.04	16.22	16.09	16.03	15.66	x	16.22	SB
7	Adrian Daianu	Romania	16.02	16.10	16.03	16.01	15.93	x	16.10	
8	Matthew O'Neal	United States	15.63	15.94	16.07	x	x	x	16.07	SB
9	Mohammed Sharfudeen	India	15.35	15.53	15.87				15.87	SB
10	Rudolph Pienaar	South Africa	15.51	15.86	–				15.86	
11	Roy Martínez	Venezuela	x	15.50	15.74				15.74	
	Jonathan Henrique Silva	Brazil	x	x	x				NM	
