= Jonathan Henrique Silva =

Brazilian triple jumper (born 1991)

Jonathan Silva
Personal information
- Full name: Jonathan Henrique Silva
- Nationality: Brazil
- Born: 21 July 1991 (age 34) Varginha, Minas Gerais, Brazil
- Height: 1.88 m (6 ft 2 in)
- Weight: 84 kg (185 lb)

Sport
- Sport: Athletics
- Updated on 3 February 2015

Jonathan Henrique Silva (born 21 July 1991) is a Brazilian triple jumper.

== Career ==
He competed in the triple jump event at the 2012 Summer Olympics.

== Personal bests ==
- 200 m: 21.35 (wind: +0.8 m/s) – São Paulo, Brazil, 22 August 2010
- 400 m: 46.78 – São Paulo, Brazil, 8 October 2011
- 110 m hurdles: 14.32 (wind: +1.9 m/s) – Asunción, Paraguay, 17 April 2010
- Long jump: 7.77 m (wind: +0.8 m/s) – Santiago, Chile, 3 April 2013
- Triple jump: 17.39 m – São Paulo, Brazil, 31 March 2012

== Achievements ==
Year	Competition	Venue	Position	Event	Notes
Representing Brazil
2008	South American Youth Championships	Lima, Peru	1st	110 m hurdles	14.12 s (wind: -2.3 m/s)
2008	South American Youth Championships	Lima, Peru	2nd	Triple jump	15.11 m (wind: +2.4 m/s) w
2009	Pan American Junior Championships	Port of Spain, Trinidad and Tobago	4th (h)	110 m hurdles	14.26 w (wind: +2.2 m/s)
2010	South American Games	Medellín, Colombia	5th	110 m hurdles	14.47 (wind: +0.7 m/s)
2010	South American Games	Medellín, Colombia	3rd	4x100 m relay	40.60
2010	World Junior Championships	Moncton, Canada	21st (q)	Triple jump	15.07 m (wind: -1.6 m/s)
2011	South American Championships	Buenos Aires, Argentina	2nd	Triple jump	16.45 m (wind: +1.0 m/s)
2012	Ibero-American Championships	Barquisimeto, Venezuela	3rd	Triple jump	16.38 m (wind: +2.0 m/s)
2012	Olympic Games	London, United Kingdom	26th (q)	Triple jump	15.59 m (wind: -1.3 m/s)
2012	South American Under-23 Championships	São Paulo, Brazil	1st	Triple jump	16.19 m w (wind: +2.4 m/s)
2013	South American Championships	Cartagena, Colombia	3rd	Triple jump	16.35 m (wind: +1.6 m/s)
2014	South American Games	Santiago, Chile	1st	Triple jump	16.51 m (wind: -0.6 m/s)
2014	Ibero-American Championships	São Paulo, Brazil	1st	Triple jump	16.84 m (wind: +1.3 m/s)
2014	Continental Cup	Marrakesh, Morocco	7th	Triple jump	16.04 m (wind: -0.4 m/s)
2015	Universiade	Gwangju, South Korea	12th (q)	Triple jump	15.55 m
