= Mauritius at the 2019 World Athletics Championships =

Mauritius at the 2019 World Championships in Athletics
- WA code: MRI

in Doha, Qatar
- Competitors: 1
- Medals: Gold 0 Silver 0 Bronze 0 Total 0

World Championships in Athletics appearances
- 1983; 1987; 1991; 1993; 1995; 1997; 1999; 2001; 2003; 2005; 2007; 2009; 2011; 2013; 2015; 2017; 2019; 2022; 2023

Mauritius competed at the 2019 World Championships in Athletics in Doha, Qatar, from 27 September–6 October 2019.

== Results ==
(q – qualified, NM – no mark, SB – season best)

=== Men ===
Track and road events

Athlete	Event	Preliminary		Heat		Semi-final		Final	
Athlete	Event	Result	Rank	Result	Rank	Result	Rank	Result	Rank
Jonathan Bardottier	100 metres	10.61	7 q	Did not start		Did not advance			
