= Cao Shuo =

Chinese triple jumper (born 1991)

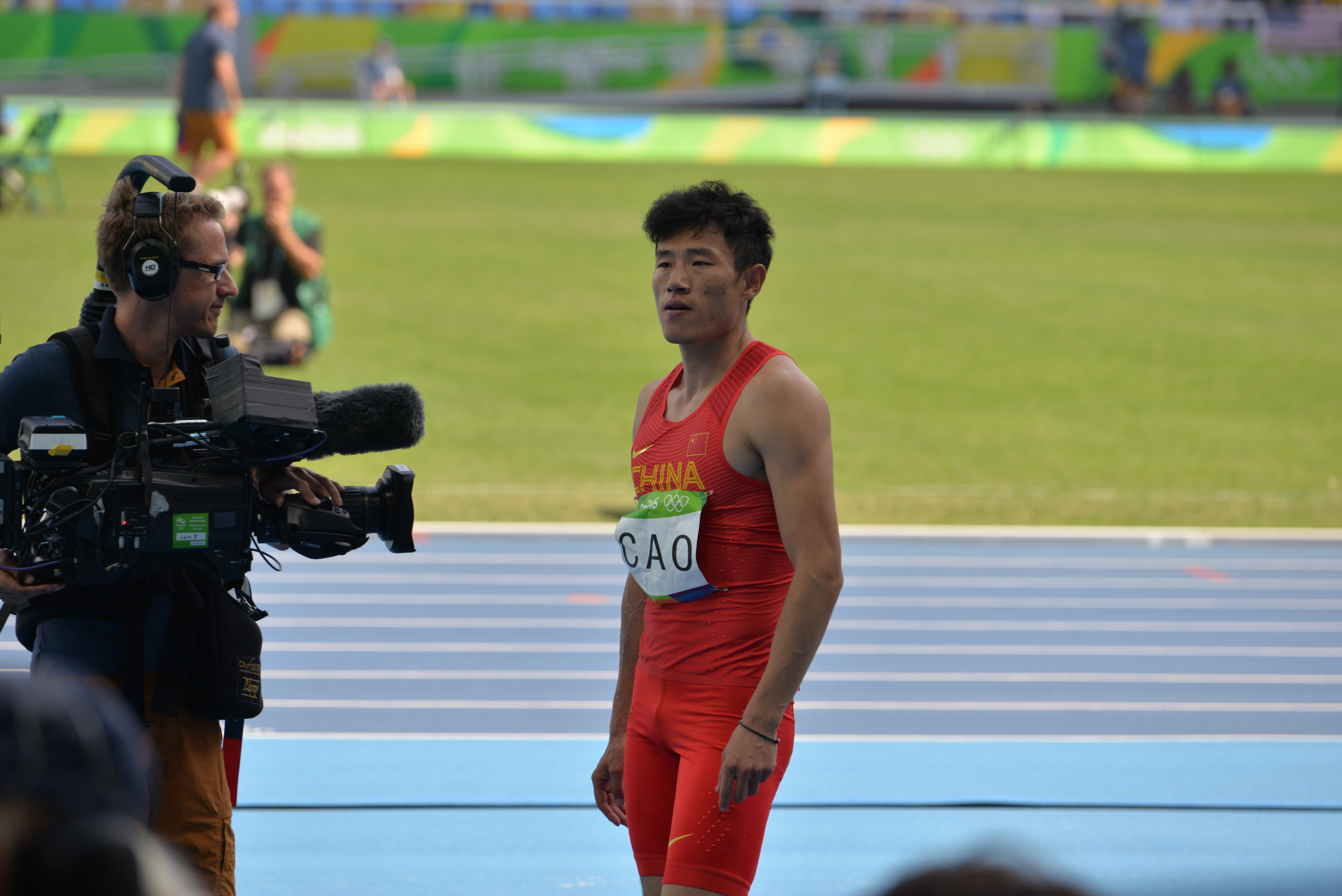

Personal information
- Native name: 曹硕
- Born: October 8, 1991 (age 34) Hebei, China
- Height: 1.82 m (5 ft 11 1/2 in)
- Weight: 69 kg (152 lb)

Sport
- Country: China
- Sport: Athletics
- Event: Triple jump
Medal record
Men's athletics
Representing China
Asian Indoor Championships
Silver medal – second place	2012 Hangzhou	Triple jump

Cao Shuo (born October 8, 1991) is a Chinese track and field athlete who specialises in the triple jump. He was born in Hebei. His personal bests were both set in 2012, outdoors, his personal best is 17.35 m, while his indoor personal best is 17.01 m. He competed at both the 2012 and 2016 Olympics. In Rio, he finished in 4th place.

== Competition record ==
Year	Competition	Venue	Position	Notes
Representing China
2010	Asian Junior Championships	Hanoi, Vietnam	1st	16.84 m (w)
2010	Asian Games	Guangzhou, China	3rd	16.84 m
2012	Asian Indoor Championships	Hangzhou, China	2nd	17.01 m (=iNR)
2012	Olympic Games	London, United Kingdom	20th (q)	16.27 m
2013	Asian Championships	Pune, India	1st	16.77 m
2013	East Asian Games	Tianjin, China	2nd	16.15 m
2014	World Indoor Championships	Sopot, Poland	7th	16.55 m
2014	Asian Games	Incheon, South Korea	1st	17.30 m
2015	Asian Championships	Wuhan, China	2nd	16.77 m
2015	World Championships	Beijing, China	15th (q)	16.66 m
2016	Asian Indoor Championships	Doha, Qatar	5th	15.76 m
2016	Olympic Games	Rio de Janeiro, Brazil	4th	17.13 m
2018	Asian Games	Jakarta, Indonesia	3rd	16.56 m
