= Mark Harry Diones =

Filipino triple jumper (born 1993)

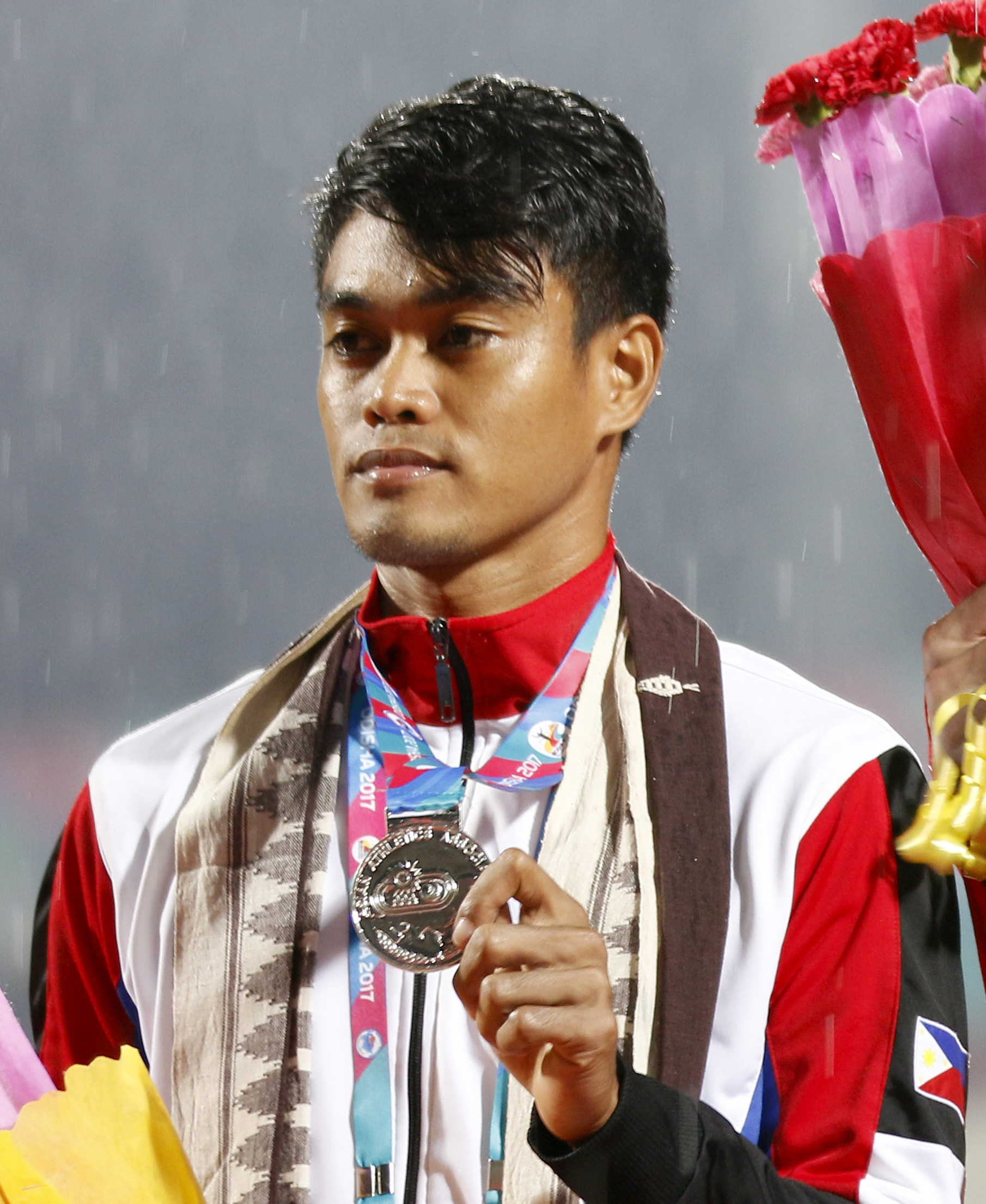
- Diones at the 2017 Asian Championships

Personal information
- Full name: Mark Harry Diones
- Nationality: Philippines
- Born: Mark Harry Aloto Diones; March 1, 1993 (age 33) Libmanan, Camarines Sur, the Philippines
- Education: Jose Rizal University
- Height: 185 cm (6 ft 1 in)
- Weight: 74 kg (163 lb)

Sport
- Sport: Athletics
- Event: Triple jump
- Coached by: George Noel Posadas; Sean Guevara; Rohsaan Eugene Griffin

Achievements and titles
- Personal best: 16.70 m (2017)
Medal record
Representing Philippines
Asian Athletics Championships
Silver medal – second place	2017 Bhubaneswar	Triple jump
Southeast Asian Games
Silver medal – second place	2017 Kuala Lumpur	Triple jump
Silver medal – second place	2019 Philippines	Triple jump
Silver medal – second place	2021 Vietnam	Triple jump
Bronze medal – third place	2023 Cambodia	Triple jump

Mark Harry Aloto Diones (born March 1, 1993) is a triple jumper from the Philippines. In 2017 he won silver medals at the Asian Championships and Southeast Asian Games. He placed 12th at the 2018 Asian Games.
