= 2015 World Championships in Athletics – Men's triple jump =

Men's triple jump at the 2015 World Championships
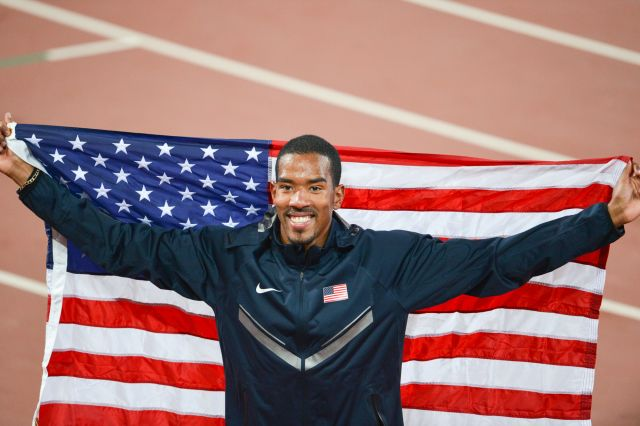
- Winner Christian Taylor with the second best jump in history
- Venue: Beijing National Stadium
- Dates: 26 August (qualification); 27 August (final)
- Competitors: 28 from 20 nations
- Winning distance: 18.21

Medalists
gold medal	Christian Taylor	United States
silver medal	Pedro Pablo Pichardo	Cuba
bronze medal	Nelson Évora	Portugal

The men's triple jump at the 2015 World Championships in Athletics was held at the Beijing National Stadium on 26 and 27 August.

The early season meet at Doha gave an indication that this would be an exciting year in the triple jump. Pedro Pablo Pichardo, who would return here as the previous silver medalist jumped 18.06 to become the #3 jumper in history. In that same meet, Olympic Champion Christian Taylor was only 2 cm behind to equal the previous #3, who was the defending world champion Teddy Tamgho. Tamgho was also in Doha, finishing in third behind the fireworks, but Tamgho was coming off a 1-year drug suspension for missing multiple tests. Following that meet, two weeks later Pichardo improved his world lead to 18.08 at home in Havana and then in early July, Taylor improved to 18.06 and beat Pichardo in Lausanne. It was destined that the World Championships would settle this battle. Tamgho did not return to defend the championship in Beijing.

In the qualification round, only Marian Oprea made an automatic qualifier on his first attempt, it took Taylor two and Pichardo three but there was no doubt either would make the final. In the final Pichardo took the first round lead with 17.52, Taylor made 17.49 on his second attempt and both jumped exactly 17.60 in the third round. Taylor took the lead in the fourth round with 17.68. Omar Craddock moved into third place with a 17.37.

It was the final attempt that settled the score. First Nelson Évora moved into the bronze medal with a 17.52. Then Taylor launched an 18.21, the second best jump in history only behind the world record of Jonathan Edwards set while winning the World Championship 20 years earlier. It was then up to Pichardo to answer and his 17.73 solidified his hold on the silver medal. Taylor's jump took the 19 year old North American Continental Record and American Record from Kenny Harrison set at the 1996 Olympics, the previous number 2 jumper in history.

== Records ==
Prior to the competition, the records were as follows:

World record	Jonathan Edwards (GBR)	18.29	Gothenburg, Sweden	7 August 1995
Championship record	Jonathan Edwards (GBR)	18.29	Gothenburg, Sweden	7 August 1995
World leading	Pedro Pablo Pichardo (CUB)	18.08	Havana, Cuba	28 May 2015
African record	Tarik Bouguetaïb (MAR)	17.37	Khemisset, Morocco	14 July 2007
Asian record	Li Yanxi (CHN)	17.59	Jinan, China	26 October 2009
North, Central American and Caribbean record	Kenny Harrison (USA)	18.09	Atlanta, United States	27 July 1996
South American record	Jadel Gregório (BRA)	17.90	Belém, Brazil	20 May 2007
European record	Jonathan Edwards (GBR)	18.29	Göteborg, Sweden	7 August 1995
Oceanian record	Ken Lorraway (AUS)	17.46	London, Great Britain	7 August 1982
The following records were established during the competition:
World Leading	Christian Taylor (USA)	18.21	Beijing, China	27 August 2015
North, Central American and Caribbean record	Christian Taylor (USA)	18.21	Beijing, China	27 August 2015

== Qualification standards ==
Entry standards
16.90

== Schedule ==
Date	Time	Round
26 August 2015	10:00	Qualification
27 August 2015	19:10	Final

All times are local times (UTC+8)

== Results ==
=== Qualification ===
Qualification: Qualifying Performance 17.00 (Q) or at least 12 best performers (q) advanced to the final.

Rank	Group	Name	Nationality	# 1	# 2	# 3	Result	Notes
1	A	Pedro Pichardo	Cuba	16.94	x	17.43	17.43	Q
2	B	Christian Taylor	United States	16.77	17.28		17.28	Q
3	A	Marian Oprea	Romania	17.07			17.07	Q, SB
4	A	Omar Craddock	United States	16.69	17.01		17.01	Q
5	B	Nelson Évora	Portugal	x	16.68	17.01	17.01	Q
6	A	Dmitriy Sorokin	Russia	16.99	x	–	16.99	q
7	B	Lyukman Adams	Russia	x	16.85	16.50	16.85	q
8	B	Benjamin Compaoré	France	x	x	16.82	16.82	q
9	A	Jonathan Drack	Mauritius	16.79	13.28	x	16.79	q
10	B	Godfrey Khotso Mokoena	South Africa	16.78	x	16.78	16.78	q
11	A	Tosin Oke	Nigeria	x	14.70	16.74	16.74	q
12	B	Leevan Sands	Bahamas	16.60	16.69	16.73	16.73	q
13	B	Marquis Dendy	United States	14.36	16.73	16.32	16.73	
14	A	Kim Deok-hyeon	South Korea	16.57	16.57	16.72	16.72	
15	A	Cao Shuo	China	16.66	16.66	16.51	16.66	
16	A	Georgi Tsonov	Bulgaria	x	x	16.59	16.59	
17	B	Rumen Dimitrov	Bulgaria	x	16.53	16.19	16.53	
18	B	Dong Bin	China	16.44	x	x	16.44	
19	A	Will Claye	United States	x	15.73	16.41	16.41	
20	B	Pablo Torrijos	Spain	15.85	15.73	16.32	16.32	
21	B	Yordanys Durañona	Dominica	x	16.12	16.27	16.27	
22	A	Samyr Lainé	Haiti	16.23	16.15	16.12	16.23	
23	A	Latario Collie-Minns	Bahamas	16.10	x	16.21	16.21	
24	A	Xu Xiaolong	China	15.97	16.19	x	16.19	
25	B	Roman Valiyev	Kazakhstan	x	x	16.04	16.04	
26	A	Jean-Cassimiro Rosa	Brazil	15.97	x	15.75	15.97	
27	B	Muhammad Hakimi Ismail	Malaysia	15.72	15.93	x	15.93	
	B	Hugues Fabrice Zango	Burkina Faso	x	x	x	NM	

=== Final ===
The final was started at 19:10.

Rank	Name	Nationality	# 1	# 2	# 3	# 4	# 5	# 6	Mark	Notes
1st place, gold medalist(s)	Christian Taylor	United States	16.85	17.49	17.60	17.68	17.22	18.21	18.21	WL, AR
2nd place, silver medalist(s)	Pedro Pichardo	Cuba	17.52	17.44	17.60	17.33	17.52	17.73	17.73	
3rd place, bronze medalist(s)	Nelson Évora	Portugal	17.28	x	17.29	x	x	17.52	17.52	SB
4	Omar Craddock	United States	17.14	17.08	x	17.14	17.37	16.50	17.37	
5	Lyukman Adams	Russia	x	17.12	17.28	x	17.21	17.23	17.28	
6	Marian Oprea	Romania	17.06	16.23	–	–	–	x	17.06	
7	Dmitriy Sorokin	Russia	16.99	16.38	x	x	x	x	16.99	
8	Tosin Oke	Nigeria	16.77	x	16.81	x	x	x	16.81	
9	Godfrey Khotso Mokoena	South Africa	16.57	16.76	16.81				16.81	
10	Leevan Sands	Bahamas	16.68	x	16.47				16.68	
11	Jonathan Drack	Mauritius	x	16.15	16.64				16.64	
12	Benjamin Compaoré	France	x	x	16.63				16.63	
