= San Naing =

Burmese long-distance runner

Personal information
- Born: March 5, 1991 (age 35)
- Height: 1.70 m (5 ft 7 in)
- Weight: 57 kg (126 lb)

Sport
- Country: Myanmar
- Event: 5000 metres

San Naing (born March 5, 1991) is a Burmese long-distance runner. He competed at the 2016 Summer Olympics in the men's 5000 metres race; his time of 15:51.05 in the heats did not qualify him for the final.
