= Kohei Yamashita =

Japanese triple jumper

Kohei Yamashita (山下 航平, Yamashita Kōhei; born 6 September 1994) is a Japanese triple jumper. He competed at the 2016 Summer Olympics in the men's triple jump event; his result of 15.71 meters in the qualifying round did not qualify him for the final.
