= Ruslan Kurbanov (triple jumper) =

Uzbekistani triple jumper

Medal record

Men's athletics

Representing Uzbekistan

Asian Indoor Championships
Bronze medal – third place	2014 Hangzhou	Triple jump

Ruslan Kurbanov (born February 10, 1993) is an Uzbekistani triple jumper, born in Samarkand. He competed at the 2016 Summer Olympics in the men's triple jump but did not have a mark in the qualifying round.
