= Athletics at the 2006 Asian Games – Men's triple jump =

Men's triple jump at the 2006 Asian Games
- Venue: Khalifa International Stadium
- Date: 12 December 2006
- Competitors: 15 from 13 nations

Medalists
gold medal	Li Yanxi	China
silver medal	Roman Valiyev	Kazakhstan
bronze medal	Kim Deok-hyeon	South Korea

The mens triple jump competition at the 2006 Asian Games in Doha, Qatar was held on 12 December 2006 at the Khalifa International Stadium.

== Schedule ==
All times are Arabia Standard Time (UTC+03:00)

Date	Time	Event
Tuesday, 12 December 2006	16:15	Final

== Records ==
Prior to this competition, the existing world, Asian and Games records were as follows.

World Record	Jonathan Edwards (GBR)	18.29	Gothenburg, Sweden	7 August 1995
Asian Record	Oleg Sakirkin (KAZ)	17.35	Moscow, Russia	5 June 1994
Games Record	Zou Sixin (CHN)	17.31	Beijing, China	3 October 1990

== Results ==
Legend

- DNS — Did not start

Rank	Athlete	Attempt						Result	Notes
Rank	Athlete	1	2	3	4	5	6	Result	Notes
1st place, gold medalist(s)	Li Yanxi (CHN)	16.65 +0.6	16.74 +1.4	X	16.64 −0.1	17.06 +0.4	X	17.06	
2nd place, silver medalist(s)	Roman Valiyev (KAZ)	16.59 +0.8	X	16.67 −0.2	16.98 +0.4	X	15.24 −0.7	16.98	
3rd place, bronze medalist(s)	Kim Deok-hyeon (KOR)	16.72 +2.4	16.56 +1.3	X	X	16.74; 0.0	16.87 +0.5	16.87	
4	Renjith Maheshwary (IND)	15.80 +0.8	15.87; 0.0	16.06 +0.7	16.54 +1.0	16.15 +1.3	16.49 +2.6	16.54	
5	Mohammad Hazzory (SYR)	16.42 +1.1	X	—	—	—	—	16.42	
6	Ibrahim Mohamedin (QAT)	16.21 +0.1	X	16.25; 0.0	15.99; 0.0	X	16.16 +0.3	16.25	
7	Zhu Shujing (CHN)	X	16.06 −1.3	X	X	X	15.71 −0.1	16.06	
8	Mohamed Abbas Darwish (UAE)	15.96 +0.3	X	X	X	X	X	15.96	
9	Ko Dae-young (KOR)	X	15.74 −0.2	15.31 +0.5				15.74	
10	Theerayut Philakong (THA)	X	15.74 +0.1	X				15.74	
11	Afshin Daghari Hemadi (IRI)	15.63 +0.7	15.48 +0.2	15.55 +1.2				15.63	
12	Chaminda Sampath (SRI)	15.15; 0.0	13.54 +0.6	15.50 +0.2				15.50	
13	Si Kuan Wong (MAC)	14.84 +2.3	X	X				14.84	
14	Nguyễn Mạnh Hiếu (VIE)	14.80; 0.0	X	14.21 +2.7				14.80	
15	Mohammed Majrashi (KSA)	X	14.13 −0.2	—				14.13	
—	Mohamed Hamdi (QAT)							DNS	
