= 2009 European Athletics Indoor Championships – Men's triple jump =

The Men's triple jump event at the 2009 European Athletics Indoor Championships was held on March 6–7.

== Medalists ==
Gold	Silver	Bronze
Fabrizio Donato; Italy	Viktor Yastrebov; Ukraine	Igor Spasovkhodskiy; Russia

== Results ==
=== Qualification ===
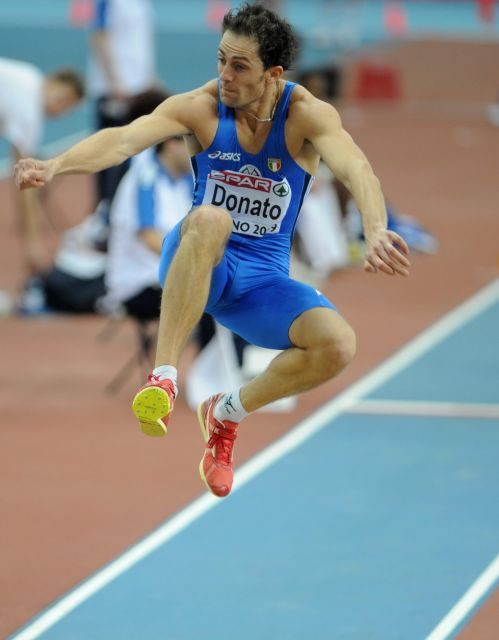
Fabrizio Donato won the gold for Italy.

Qualifying perf. 16.85 (Q) or 8 best performers (q) advanced to the Final.

Rank	Athlete	Nationality	#1	#2	#3	Result	Note
1	Jaanus Uudmäe	Estonia	16.39	16.49	17.06	17.06	Q, PB
2	Dzmitry Dzetsuk	Belarus	x	16.96		16.96	Q, PB
3	Karl Taillepierre	France	16.29	16.88		16.88	Q
4	Viktor Yastrebov	Ukraine	16.66	16.78	–	16.78	q
5	Fabrizio Donato	Italy	x	16.65	–	16.65	q
6	Igor Spasovkhodskiy	Russia	16.58	x	x	16.58	q
7	Yevgeniy Plotnir	Russia	16.28	16.50	16.24	16.50	q
8	Jules Lechanga	France	16.47	x	16.49	16.49	q
9	Vladimir Letnicov	Moldova	16.41	x	x	16.41	
10	Klim Vorobyev	Russia	15.99	16.38	16.28	16.38	
11	Jaroslav Dobrovodský	Slovakia	16.05	16.36	15.14	16.36	
12	Yevhen Semenenko	Ukraine	15.64	x	16.14	16.14	
13	Teddy Tamgho	France	15.94	x	x	15.94	
14	Daniele Greco	Italy	x	x	15.76	15.76	
15	Alin Anghel	Romania	15.56	14.94	x	15.56	

=== Final ===
Rank	Athlete	Nationality	#1	#2	#3	#4	#5	#6	Result	Note
1st place, gold medalist(s)	Fabrizio Donato	Italy	x	x	x	x	17.59	–	17.59	NR
2nd place, silver medalist(s)	Viktor Yastrebov	Ukraine	16.94	17.25	–	–	x	x	17.25	PB
3rd place, bronze medalist(s)	Igor Spasovkhodskiy	Russia	16.71	x	13.82	17.15	16.82	16.69	17.15	SB
4	Karl Taillepierre	France	x	x	16.80	17.12	16.84	17.03	17.12	PB
5	Dzmitry Dzetsuk	Belarus	x	16.16	16.88	x	x	16.07	16.88	
6	Yevgeniy Plotnir	Russia	15.75	16.81	16.64	14.51	16.53	16.19	16.81	SB
7	Jaanus Uudmäe	Estonia	x	16.13	x	x	16.73	16.31	16.73	
8	Jules Lechanga	France	16.15	16.60	15.40	x	16.15	16.64	16.64	
