= Uudmäe =

Uudmäe is a surname. Notable people with the surname include:

- Jaak Uudmäe (born 1954), Estonian triple jumper and long jumper
- Jaanus Uudmäe (born 1980), Estonian triple jumper and long jumper
