= 2009 Asian Athletics Championships – Men's triple jump =

The men's triple jump event at the 2009 Asian Athletics Championships was held at the Guangdong Olympic Stadium on November 13.

== Results ==
Rank	Athlete	Nationality	#1	#2	#3	#4	#5	#6	Result	Notes
1st place, gold medalist(s)	Roman Valiyev	Kazakhstan	x	16.56	16.70	x	x	16.40	16.70	
2nd place, silver medalist(s)	Zhu Shujing	China	15.55w	16.06	16.48w	16.40	x	16.67	16.67	SB
3rd place, bronze medalist(s)	Yevgeniy Ektov	Kazakhstan	16.12	16.00	16.17	16.49	16.46	x	16.49	
4	Renjith Maheswary	India	15.91	16.27	16.20	16.40w	16.12	16.48w	16.48w	
5	Mohammed Abbas Darwish	United Arab Emirates	15.75	15.49	x	16.02	15.78w	15.96	16.02	
6	Nguyen Van Hung	Vietnam	x	14.76	15.84	15.57w	–	–	15.84	
7	Kazuyoshi Ishikawa	Japan	x	x	15.60	15.24	14.57	15.63	15.63	
8	Tseng Stefan	Singapore	15.21	15.58	15.24	15.29w	15.04	15.42w	15.58	
9	Ruslan Kurbanov	Uzbekistan	15.49	15.10	x				15.49	PB
10	Chamara Nuwan Gamage	Sri Lanka	14.83	14.63	x				14.83	
	Kim Deok-hyeon	South Korea							DNS	
	Si Kuan Wong	Macau							DNS	
