= Athletics at the 2010 Asian Games – Men's triple jump =

Men's triple jump at the 2010 Asian Games
- Venue: Aoti Main Stadium
- Date: 26 November 2010
- Competitors: 16 from 11 nations

Medalists
gold medal	Li Yanxi	China
silver medal	Yevgeniy Ektov	Kazakhstan
bronze medal	Cao Shuo	China

The men's triple jump event at the 2010 Asian Games was held at the Aoti Main Stadium, Guangzhou, China on 26 November.

== Schedule ==
All times are China Standard Time (UTC+08:00)

Date	Time	Event
Friday, 26 November 2010	17:10	Final

== Records ==
Prior to this competition, the existing world, Asian and Games records were as follows.

World Record	Jonathan Edwards (GBR)	18.29	Gothenburg, Sweden	7 August 1995
Asian Record	Li Yanxi (CHN)	17.59	Jinan, China	26 October 2009
Games Record	Zou Sixin (CHN)	17.31	Beijing, China	3 October 1990

== Results ==
Rank	Athlete	Attempt						Result	Notes
Rank	Athlete	1	2	3	4	5	6	Result	Notes
1st place, gold medalist(s)	Li Yanxi (CHN)	16.40 +0.7	16.13 +0.8	16.74 +0.9	16.45 +0.8	16.94 +1.2	—	16.94	
2nd place, silver medalist(s)	Yevgeniy Ektov (KAZ)	16.44 +1.4	X +0.8	16.58 +0.5	16.67 +0.8	16.86 +1.2	16.68 +0.8	16.86	
3rd place, bronze medalist(s)	Cao Shuo (CHN)	X +0.6	16.13 +1.1	X +0.8	X +0.9	16.54 +0.9	16.84 +0.9	16.84	
4	Renjith Maheshwary (IND)	16.09 +0.7	16.33 +1.3	16.18 +0.4	16.76 +0.8	16.71 +0.9	16.32 +1.1	16.76	
5	Kim Deok-hyeon (KOR)	X +1.1	X +0.8	16.56 +0.6	X +0.9	X +0.8	X +0.8	16.56	
6	Roman Valiyev (KAZ)	X +1.5	16.44 +0.5	X +1.2	16.51 +0.7	X +0.6	X +1.2	16.51	
7	Amarjit Singh (IND)	15.96 +1.1	16.04 +1.2	15.82 +0.7	X +0.8	X +0.9	16.15 +0.6	16.15	
8	Theerayut Philakong (THA)	X +0.8	15.73 +1.1	X +0.3	X +0.8	X +0.9	14.02 +0.8	15.73	
9	Varunyoo Kongnil (THA)	X +1.5	X +0.9	15.63 +0.5				15.63	
10	Mohamed Abbas Darwish (UAE)	X +1.4	X +1.4	15.60 +0.6				15.60	
11	Lee Kang-min (KOR)	X +0.9	X +0.9	15.54 +1.0				15.54	
12	Mohamed Yusuf Salman (BRN)	X +0.6	X +0.9	15.28 +0.5				15.28	
13	Si Kuan Wong (MAC)	15.15 +1.2	14.72 +1.4	14.86 +0.1				15.15	
14	Nguyễn Văn Hùng (VIE)	X +0.6	X +0.2	15.06 +1.2				15.06	
15	Abdullah Al-Youhah (IOC)	14.82 +1.4	X +1.0	14.41 +0.9				14.82	
16	Ahmed Faraj (KSA)	X +0.6	X +1.0	14.80 +0.2				14.80	
