= 2007 European Athletics U23 Championships – Men's triple jump =

The men's triple jump event at the 2007 European Athletics U23 Championships was held in Debrecen, Hungary, at Gyulai István Atlétikai Stadion on 14 and 15 July.

== Medalists ==
Gold	Gary White; United Kingdom
Silver	Adrian Świderski; Poland
Bronze	Yuriy Zhuravlyev; Russia

== Results ==
=== Final ===
15 July

Rank	Name	Nationality	Attempts						Result	Notes
Rank	Name	Nationality	1	2	3	4	5	6	Result	Notes
1st place, gold medalist(s)	Gary White	United Kingdom	16.03 (w: 0.4 m/s)	15.94 (w: 0.4 m/s)	15.86 (w: -0.1 m/s)	16.33 (w: -0.2 m/s)	14.23 (w: -0.1 m/s)	16.01 +0.2	16.33 (w: -0.2 m/s)	
2nd place, silver medalist(s)	Adrian Świderski	Poland	15.52 (w: -0.8 m/s)	15.86 (w: -0.4 m/s)	15.94 (w: -1.1 m/s)	x	16.29 (w: -0.6 m/s)	16.07 (w: -0.7 m/s)	16.29 (w: -0.6 m/s)	
3rd place, bronze medalist(s)	Yuriy Zhuravlyev	Russia	16.03 (w: 0.0 m/s)	16.13 (w: -0.4 m/s)	x	15.71 (w: 0.2 m/s)	15.74 (w: -0.7 m/s)	16.22 (w: -0.3 m/s)	16.22 (w: -0.3 m/s)	
4	Andrés Capellán	Spain	16.05 (w: 1.0 m/s)	–	x	x	–	16.18 (w: -0.7 m/s)	16.18 (w: -0.7 m/s)	
5	Fabien Harmenil	France	16.14 (w: 0.0 m/s)	15.79 (w: 0.1 m/s)	15.84 (w: -0.2 m/s)	x	14.25 (w: -0.9 m/s)	x	16.14 (w: 0.0 m/s)	
6	Alin Anghel	Romania	x	15.70 (w: 0.0 m/s)	15.91 (w: 0.0 m/s)	15.90 (w: -0.2 m/s)	15.79 (w: -0.3 m/s)	x	15.91 (w: 0.0 m/s)	
7	Dzmitry Dziatsuk	Belarus	15.55 (w: -0.6 m/s)	x	15.86 (w: -0.4 m/s)	x	x	15.56 (w: -0.3 m/s)	15.86 (w: -0.4 m/s)	
8	Wojciech Lewandowski	Poland	x	15.77 (w: -0.5 m/s)	15.82 (w: -0.5 m/s)	13.56 (w: -0.4 m/s)	15.76 (w: -0.5 m/s)	x	15.82 (w: -0.5 m/s)	
9	Nikolaos Dontas	Greece	x	15.65 (w: 0.2 m/s)	15.80 (w: 0.0 m/s)				15.80 (w: 0.0 m/s)	
10	José Emilio Bellido	Spain	x	x	15.72 (w: -0.9 m/s)				15.72 (w: -0.9 m/s)	
11	Dmytro Tyden	Ukraine	x	15.70 (w: -0.3 m/s)	x				15.70 (w: -0.3 m/s)	
12	Anton Boltenkov	Russia	x	x	15.32 (w: -0.3 m/s)				15.32 (w: -0.3 m/s)	

=== Qualifications ===
14 July
Qualifying 15.85 or 12 best to the Final

==== Group A ====
Rank	Name	Nationality	Result	Notes
1	Fabien Harmenil	France	16.11 (w: 0.1 m/s)	Q
2	José Emilio Bellido	Spain	16.04 (w: 0.6 m/s)	Q
3	Wojciech Lewandowski	Poland	15.95 (w: 0.3 m/s)	Q
4	Yuriy Zhuravlyev	Russia	15.85 (w: 0.8 m/s)	Q
5	Nikolaos Dontas	Greece	15.84 (w: 0.4 m/s)	q
6	Pere Joseph	Spain	15.80 (w: 1.6 m/s)	
7	Vladimir Velin	Bulgaria	15.78 (w: -0.2 m/s)	
8	Elliot O'Neill	United Kingdom	15.69 (w: 0.3 m/s)	
9	Marián Hruška	Slovakia	15.64 (w: 0.7 m/s)	
10	Dmitriy Kolosov	Russia	15.59 (w: 0.1 m/s)	
11	Vladimir Borisenko	Israel	14.87 (w: -0.2 m/s)	

==== Group B ====
Rank	Name	Nationality	Result	Notes
1	Andrés Capellán	Spain	16.37 (w: 1.0 m/s)	Q
2	Dmytro Tyden	Ukraine	15.95 (w: 0.4 m/s)	Q
3	Dzmitry Dziatsuk	Belarus	15.92 (w: 0.7 m/s)	Q
4	Anton Boltenkov	Russia	15.89 (w: 1.8 m/s)	Q
5	Adrian Świderski	Poland	15.88 (w: 0.0 m/s)	Q
6	Gary White	United Kingdom	15.87 (w: -0.5 m/s)	Q
7	Alin Anghel	Romania	15.86 (w: 0.1 m/s)	Q
8	Bence Fejős	Hungary	14.86 (w: 0.5 m/s)	
9	Redzhep Selman	North Macedonia	14.84 (w: 0.7 m/s)	
	Maksim Tkačovs	Latvia	NM	
	Teymur Abbasov	Azerbaijan	DNS	

== Participation ==
According to an unofficial count, 21 athletes from 15 countries participated in the event.

- Belarus (1)
- Bulgaria (1)
- France (1)
- Greece (1)
- Hungary (1)
- Israel (1)
- Latvia (1)
- North Macedonia (1)
- Poland (2)
- Romania (1)
- Russia (3)
- Slovakia (1)
- Spain (3)
- Ukraine (1)
- United Kingdom (2)
