= Track and field at the 2011 Military World Games – Men's triple jump =

The men's triple jump event at the 2011 Military World Games was held on 19 and 21 July at the Estádio Olímpico João Havelange.

== Records ==
Prior to this competition, the existing world and CISM record were as follows:

| World Record | Jonathan Edwards (GBR) | 18.29 | Gothenburg, Sweden | 7 August 1995 |
| CISM World Record | João Carlos de Oliveira (BRA) | 17.38 | | 1976 |

== Schedule ==
| Date | Time | Round |
|---|---|---|
| 19 July 2011 | 16:20 | Qualification |
| 21 July 2011 | 10:00 | Final |

== Medalists ==
| Gold | Silver | Bronze |
|---|---|---|
| Jefferson Sabino; Brazil | Issam Nima; Algeria | Dzmitry Dziatsuk; Belarus |

== Results ==
=== Final ===
| Rank | Athlete | Nationality | #1 | #2 | #3 | #4 | #5 | #6 | Mark | Notes |
|---|---|---|---|---|---|---|---|---|---|---|
| 1st place, gold medalist(s) | Jefferson Sabino | Brazil | 16.89 (-0.6 m/s) | x | – | x | – | x | 16.89 (-0.6 m/s) | |
| 2nd place, silver medalist(s) | Issam Nima | Algeria | 16.49 (-0.4 m/s) | x | 16.36 (-0.2 m/s) | x | x | x | 16.49 (-0.4 m/s) | |
| 3rd place, bronze medalist(s) | Dzmitry Dziatsuk | Belarus | 16.09 (+0.5 m/s) | 16.38 (0.0 m/s) | x | x | 16.06 (-0.2 m/s) | 16.08 (+0.2 m/s) | 16.38 (0.0 m/s) | |
| 4 | Dmytro Tyden | Ukraine | 15.90 (-0.8 m/s) | 15.75 (-1.2 m/s) | 16.07 (-0.5 m/s) | 15.28 (-0.3 m/s) | 16.35 (-0.2 m/s) | x | 16.35 (-0.2 m/s) | |
| 5 | Dmitry Platnitski | Belarus | x | 16.03 (+0.8 m/s) | x | x | 16.27 (+0.1 m/s) | 15.99 (+0.8 m/s) | 16.27 (+0.1 m/s) | |
| 6 | Jadel Gregório | Brazil | x | 15.87 (-0.4 m/s) | 15.95 (-1.2 m/s) | 16.04 (-1.7 m/s) | 14.99 (-0.2 m/s) | 16.04 (+0.2 m/s) | 16.04 (-1.7 m/s) | |
| 7 | Adrian Swiderski | Poland | 16.02 (-0.6 m/s) | x | x | 15.90 (0.0 m/s) | 15.95 (+0.2 m/s) | x | 16.02 (-0.6 m/s) | |
| 8 | Malkit Singh | India | 15.21 (-0.3 m/s) | 15.11 (-1.3 m/s) | 15.70 (-0.7 m/s) | 15.72 (-0.4 m/s) | x | 15.47 (-0.6 m/s) | 15.72 (-0.4 m/s) | |
| 9 | Bibu Mathew | India | 15.56 (+0.2 m/s) | x | x | | | | 15.56 (+0.2 m/s) | |
| 10 | Alexander Hochuli | Switzerland | 15.53 (-0.4 m/s) | 15.14 (-0.7 m/s) | 15.36 (+0.2 m/s) | | | | 15.53 (-0.4 m/s) | |
| 11 | Hassan Bazzine | Morocco | 13.61 (-0.3 m/s) | 14.64 (-0.8 m/s) | 15.16 (-0.3 m/s) | | | | 15.16 (-0.3 m/s) | |
| | Zafar Iqbal | Pakistan | x | – | – | | | | NM | |
