= 2000 World Junior Championships in Athletics – Men's triple jump =

The men's triple jump event at the 2000 World Junior Championships in Athletics was held in Santiago, Chile, at Estadio Nacional Julio Martínez Prádanos on 19 and 20 October.

== Medalists ==
Gold	Marian Oprea; Romania
Silver	Yoandri Betanzos; Cuba
Bronze	Mohd Abdulaziz; Qatar

== Results ==
=== Final ===
20 October

Rank	Name	Nationality	Attempts						Result	Notes
Rank	Name	Nationality	1	2	3	4	5	6	Result	Notes
1st place, gold medalist(s)	Marian Oprea	Romania	16.21 (w: +1.3 m/s)	x	16.32 (w: +0.7 m/s)	16.25 (w: +0.5 m/s)	x	16.41 (w: +1.9 m/s)	16.41 (w: +1.9 m/s)	
2nd place, silver medalist(s)	Yoandri Betanzos	Cuba	15.82 (w: -0.1 m/s)	15.96 (w: +0.4 m/s)	16.13 (w: +0.2 m/s)	x	16.19 (w: +1.5 m/s)	16.34 (w: +0.5 m/s)	16.34 (w: +0.5 m/s)	
3rd place, bronze medalist(s)	Mohd Abdulaziz	Qatar	15.76 (w: -0.4 m/s)	15.30 (w: -1.3 m/s)	16.12 (w: +0.3 m/s)	15.58 (w: +1.6 m/s)	16.29 (w: -0.5 m/s)	14.20 (w: +0.9 m/s)	16.29 (w: -0.5 m/s)	
4	Gu Junjie	China	16.10 (w: +0.2 m/s)	15.37 (w: +0.8 m/s)	x	15.61 (w: -2.1 m/s)	15.70 (w: +0.3 m/s)	16.26 (w: +0.7 m/s)	16.26 (w: +0.7 m/s)	
5	Leevan Sands	Bahamas	15.74 (w: +0.6 m/s)	x	16.17 (w: 0.0 m/s)	16.22 (w: -1.3 m/s)	15.80 (w: +1.1 m/s)	16.12 (w: +1.1 m/s)	16.22 (w: -1.3 m/s)	
6	Arvydas Nazarovas	Lithuania	16.13 (w: +0.4 m/s)	15.52 (w: -0.2 m/s)	x	15.87 (w: -2.2 m/s)	15.72 (w: -0.1 m/s)	x	16.13 (w: +0.4 m/s)	
7	Marcelo da Costa	Brazil	15.51 (w: -0.1 m/s)	x	16.10 (w: -0.3 m/s)	15.94 (w: +1.0 m/s)	15.92 (w: -0.7 m/s)	16.05 (w: +0.5 m/s)	16.10 (w: -0.3 m/s)	
8	Ibrahim Abubaker	Qatar	15.75 (w: +1.1 m/s)	15.58 (w: +0.3 m/s)	16.05 (w: -0.4 m/s)	14.76 (w: +0.7 m/s)	15.76 (w: +0.4 m/s)	15.85 (w: -1.1 m/s)	16.05 (w: -0.4 m/s)	
9	Dmitriy Valyukevich	Belarus	15.48 (w: -0.4 m/s)	16.05 (w: +1.5 m/s)	15.46 (w: +0.9 m/s)				16.05 (w: +1.5 m/s)	
10	Steven Shalders	United Kingdom	15.99 (w: -1.3 m/s)	15.55 (w: -0.3 m/s)	15.29 (w: +0.9 m/s)				15.99 (w: -1.3 m/s)	
11	Rudolf Helpling	Germany	15.68 (w: +1.5 m/s)	x	15.41 (w: +0.9 m/s)				15.68 (w: +1.5 m/s)	
12	Davy Manga	France	15.46 (w: +1.4 m/s)	13.67 (w: -0.4 m/s)	15.65 (w: -0.9 m/s)				15.65 (w: -0.9 m/s)	

=== Qualifications ===
19 October

==== Group A ====
Rank	Name	Nationality	Attempts			Result	Notes
Rank	Name	Nationality	1	2	3	Result	Notes
1	Leevan Sands	Bahamas	16.22 (w: +0.5 m/s)	-	-	16.22 (w: +0.5 m/s)	Q
2	Mohd Abdulaziz	Qatar	16.10 (w: +0.3 m/s)	-	-	16.10 (w: +0.3 m/s)	Q
3	Marian Oprea	Romania	15.87 (w: +1.5 m/s)	x	16.02 (w: +0.3 m/s)	16.02 (w: +0.3 m/s)	q
4	Arvydas Nazarovas	Lithuania	x	x	15.93 (w: +0.7 m/s)	15.93 (w: +0.7 m/s)	q
5	Gu Junjie	China	15.72 (w: +1.5 m/s)	15.86 (w: +0.1 m/s)	15.78 (w: +0.6 m/s)	15.86 (w: +0.1 m/s)	q
6	Dimítrios Tsiámis	Greece	15.25 (w: -0.5 m/s)	14.92 (w: -0.7 m/s)	15.58 (w: +0.5 m/s)	15.58 (w: +0.5 m/s)	
7	Viktor Yastrebov	Ukraine	15.23 (w: -0.6 m/s)	15.56 (w: +0.3 m/s)	15.47 (w: +0.6 m/s)	15.56 (w: +0.3 m/s)	
8	Kazuyoshi Ishikawa	Japan	15.40 (w: +0.5 m/s)	15.50 (w: 0.0 m/s)	15.51 (w: +0.6 m/s)	15.51 (w: +0.6 m/s)	
9	Jefferson Sabino	Brazil	x	15.48 (w: -1.4 m/s)	x	15.48 (w: -1.4 m/s)	
10	Erik Nurijanyan	Armenia	15.30 (w: +0.4 m/s)	15.34 (w: +0.9 m/s)	14.97 (w: -0.1 m/s)	15.34 (w: +0.9 m/s)	
11	Géraud Honoré	France	15.11 (w: +0.8 m/s)	14.43 (w: -1.2 m/s)	x	15.11 (w: +0.8 m/s)	
12	Stylianos Petrou	Cyprus	14.92 (w: +1.1 m/s)	14.87 (w: 0.0 m/s)	x	14.92 (w: +1.1 m/s)	
13	Lee Yeong-Jae	South Korea	14.37 (w: +0.2 m/s)	x	14.26 (w: +0.2 m/s)	14.37 (w: +0.2 m/s)	

==== Group B ====
Rank	Name	Nationality	Attempts			Result	Notes
Rank	Name	Nationality	1	2	3	Result	Notes
1	Yoandri Betanzos	Cuba	16.67 (w: +0.3 m/s)	-	-	16.67 (w: +0.3 m/s)	Q
2	Dmitriy Valyukevich	Belarus	16.39 (w: +0.7 m/s)	-	-	16.39 (w: +0.7 m/s)	Q
3	Marcelo da Costa	Brazil	16.11 (w: +1.4 m/s)	-	-	16.11 (w: +1.4 m/s)	Q
4	Rudolf Helpling	Germany	x	16.00 (w: -0.2 m/s)	16.02 (w: -0.6 m/s)	16.02 (w: -0.6 m/s)	q
5	Davy Manga	France	15.54 (w: +0.9 m/s)	15.67 (w: -1.5 m/s)	15.99 (w: +0.9 m/s)	15.99 (w: +0.9 m/s)	q
6	Steven Shalders	United Kingdom	14.99 (w: +0.6 m/s)	15.55 (w: +0.2 m/s)	15.84 (w: 0.0 m/s)	15.84 (w: 0.0 m/s)	q
7	Ibrahim Abubaker	Qatar	14.33 w (w: +2.1 m/s)	15.50 (w: +0.8 m/s)	15.81 (w: -0.7 m/s)	15.81 (w: -0.7 m/s)	q
8	Jason Ward	United States	x	15.79 (w: -0.8 m/s)	-	15.79 (w: -0.8 m/s)	
9	Vladimir Letnicov	Moldova	15.35 (w: +0.2 m/s)	x	14.82 (w: -0.2 m/s)	15.35 (w: +0.2 m/s)	
10	Nikólaos Lagós	Greece	15.25 (w: +0.6 m/s)	x	15.27 (w: +0.3 m/s)	15.27 (w: +0.3 m/s)	
11	Piero Vojvodic	Peru	15.11 (w: 0.0 m/s)	15.22 (w: -0.6 m/s)	14.87 (w: +0.4 m/s)	15.22 (w: -0.6 m/s)	
12	Jorge Naranjo	Chile	x	14.71 (w: -0.2 m/s)	x	14.71 (w: -0.2 m/s)	
	Abdou Lam	Senegal	x	x	x	NM	

== Participation ==
According to an unofficial count, 26 athletes from 22 countries participated in the event.

- Armenia (1)
- Bahamas (1)
- Belarus (1)
- Brazil (2)
- Chile (1)
- China (1)
- Cuba (1)
- Cyprus (1)
- France (2)
- Germany (1)
- Greece (2)
- Japan (1)
- Lithuania (1)
- Moldova (1)
- Peru (1)
- Qatar (2)
- Romania (1)
- Senegal (1)
- South Korea (1)
- Ukraine (1)
- United Kingdom (1)
- United States (1)
