= Simone Bianchi =

Simone Bianchi may refer to:

- Simone Bianchi (athlete) (born 1973), Italian long-jumper
- Simone Bianchi (artist) (born 1972), Italian comic book artist, painter, and graphic artist
