= 2005 Asian Athletics Championships – Men's triple jump =

The men's triple jump event at the 2005 Asian Athletics Championships was held in Incheon, South Korea on September 2–3.

== Medalists ==
Gold	Silver	Bronze
Gu Junjie; China	Kazuyoshi Ishikawa; Japan	Kim Deok-hyeon; South Korea

== Results ==
=== Qualification ===
Rank	Group	Name	Nationality	Result	Notes
1	B	Roman Valiyev	Kazakhstan	16.67	SB
2	A	Mohammad Hazzory	Syria	16.39	Q
3	B	Kazuyoshi Ishikawa	Japan	16.21	Q
4	B	Gu Junjie	China	16.15	Q
5	A	Kim Deok-hyeon	South Korea	16.06	Q
6	B	Nattaporn Nomkanha	Thailand	16.02	Q, SB
7	A	Salem Al-Ahmedi	Saudi Arabia	16.01	Q
8	B	Therayut Philakong	Thailand	15.76	q
9	B	Dmitriy Mashtakov	Uzbekistan	15.70	q
10	A	Daiki Deguchi	Japan	15.60	q
11	A	Yevgeniy Ektov	Kazakhstan	15.50	q
12	B	Bae Yong-Il	North Korea	15.31	q, PB
13	A	Mohamed Al-Majrashi	Saudi Arabia	15.15	
14	B	Ahmad Firdaus Salim	Malaysia	15.14	
15	A	Sampath Weerasinghe	Sri Lanka	14.98	
16	A	Si Kuan Wong	Macau	14.69	
17	A	Waseem Khan	Pakistan	14.53	

=== Final ===
Rank	Name	Nationality	Result	Notes
1st place, gold medalist(s)	Gu Junjie	China	16.90w	
2nd place, silver medalist(s)	Kazuyoshi Ishikawa	Japan	16.88	
3rd place, bronze medalist(s)	Kim Deok-hyeon	South Korea	16.78	NR
4	Roman Valiyev	Kazakhstan	16.26	
5	Salem Al-Ahmedi	Saudi Arabia	16.26	
6	Mohammad Hazzory	Syria	16.26	
7	Yevgeniy Ektov	Kazakhstan	15.67	
8	Nattaporn Nomkanha	Thailand	15.61	
9	Daiki Deguchi	Japan	15.40	
10	Therayut Philakong	Thailand	15.36	
11	Bae Yong-Il	North Korea	14.95	
12	Dmitriy Mashtakov	Uzbekistan	14.38	
