= Athletics at the 2007 Summer Universiade – Men's triple jump =

The men's triple jump event at the 2007 Summer Universiade was held on 13–14 August.

== Medalists ==
Gold	Silver	Bronze
Kim Deok-hyeon; South Korea	Viktor Kuznyetsov; Ukraine	Wu Bo; China

== Results ==
=== Qualification ===
Qualification: 16.50 m (Q) or at least 12 best (q) qualified for the final.

Rank	Group	Athlete	Nationality	#1	#2	#3	Result	Notes
1	B	Kim Deok-hyeon	South Korea	16.47	16.71		16.71	Q, SB
2	A	Wu Bo	China	16.66			16.66	Q
3	A	Dzmitry Platnitski	Belarus	x	x	16.62	16.62	Q
4	A	Yuriy Zhuravlyev	Russia	16.44w	–	–	16.44w	q
5	A	Viktor Kuznyetsov	Ukraine	16.40	–	–	16.40	q
6	B	Fabrizio Schembri	Italy	16.35	16.16	x	16.35	q
7	B	Mantas Dilys	Lithuania	16.34	–	–	16.34	q
8	A	Kittisak Sukon	Thailand	16.06	16.22	14.81	16.22	q
9	B	Jiang Wei	China	15.96	16.15	x	16.15	q
10	B	Anton Boltenkov	Russia	15.94	16.11	16.07	16.11	q
11	A	Roger Haitengi	Namibia	15.27	16.03	15.79	16.03	q
12	A	Juan Carlos Nájera	Guatemala	x	x	15.99w	15.99w	q
13	B	Gary White	Great Britain	x	15.94	x	15.94	
14	B	Theerayut Philakong	Thailand	15.89	x	x	15.89	
15	A	Nigolaos Lagos	Greece	15.78	15.70	15.86	15.86	SB
16	A	Salim Ahmad Firdays	Malaysia	15.19w	15.61	15.80	15.80	
17	B	Paweł Kruhlik	Poland	x	x	15.76	15.76	
18	B	Thomas Flensborg-Madsen	Denmark	15.58	15.27	15.75	15.75	
19	A	Mouad Benchikh Lehocine	Algeria	15.49	15.56	15.50	15.56	
20	A	Tumelo Thagane	South Africa	x	15.54	14.59	15.54	
21	B	Alin Anghel	Romania	x	x	15.49	15.49	
22	A	Michele Boni	Italy	x	15.25	–	15.25	
23	A	Si Kuan Wong	Macau	x	15.19	x	15.19	PB
24	B	Ahmed Khairallah	Egypt	x	15.06	x	15.06	
25	A	Kasper Hansen	Denmark	x	14.74	14.91	14.91	PB
26	B	Mohd Yah Syahlil	Malaysia	x	14.18	14.33	14.33	
27	B	Moses Edweu Ejobu	Uganda	14.05	14.33	–	14.33	
28	B	Chamara Kumara	Sri Lanka	13.77	13.78	13.43	13.78	
	A	Teymur Abbasov	Azerbaijan	x	x	x	NM	
	A	Yevgeniy Ektov	Kazakhstan	x	x	x	NM	
	A	Jaanus Suvi	Estonia	x	x	x	NM	
	B	Jason Sewanyana	South Africa	x	x	–	NM	
	B	Ioannis Thomas	Greece	x	x	x	NM	
	B	Ahmed Houmida	Morocco				DNS	

=== Final ===
Rank	Athlete	Nationality	#1	#2	#3	#4	#5	$6	Result	Notes
1st place, gold medalist(s)	Kim Deok-hyeon	South Korea	16.34	16.63	16.82	17.02	16.80	x	17.02	SB
2nd place, silver medalist(s)	Viktor Kuznyetsov	Ukraine	16.31	x	16.21	16.94	16.65	16.56	16.94	SB
3rd place, bronze medalist(s)	Wu Bo	China	16.31	16.64	16.13	16.60	x	16.39	16.64	
4	Yuriy Zhuravlyev	Russia	16.05	15.82	x	16.14	16.59	16.39	16.59	
5	Dzmitry Platnitski	Belarus	16.50	15.71	16.38	x	x	16.48	16.50	
6	Jiang Wei	China	15.40	15.78	16.12	x	16.41	16.15	16.41	PB
7	Fabrizio Schembri	Italy	16.30	x	16.31	x	15.99	15.86	16.31	
8	Mantas Dilys	Lithuania	x	15.35	16.03	x	x	16.06	16.06	
9	Roger Haitengi	Namibia	15.91	15.61	15.71				15.91	
10	Anton Boltenkov	Russia	15.82	15.82	15.42				15.82	
11	Kittisak Sukon	Thailand	15.57	14.21	–				15.57	
12	Juan Carlos Nájera	Guatemala	x	14.80	15.42				15.42	
