= Athletics at the 1995 Summer Universiade – Men's long jump =

The men's long jump event at the 1995 Summer Universiade was held on 2–3 September at the Hakatanomori Athletic Stadium in Fukuoka, Japan.

The gold and silver medallists achieved the same distance. As of 2024, this is the only time this has happened in the men's long jump at these games.

== Medalists ==
| Gold | Silver | Bronze |
|---|---|---|
| Kirill Sosunov; Russia | Georg Ackermann; Germany | Gregor Cankar; Slovenia |

== Results ==
=== Qualification ===
Qualification: 7.70 m (Q) or at least 12 best (q) qualified for the final.

| Rank | Group | Athlete | Nationality | #1 | #2 | #3 | Result | Notes |
|---|---|---|---|---|---|---|---|---|
| 1 | B | Gregor Cankar | Slovenia | 7.55 | 7.65 | 7.96 | 7.96 | Q |
| 2 | A | Kirill Sosunov | Russia | 7.26 | x | 7.96 | 7.92 | Q |
| 3 | B | Sean Robbins | United States | 7.58 | 7.44 | 7.88 | 7.88 | Q |
| 4 | A | Chao Chih-Kuo | Chinese Taipei | 7.87 | | | 7.87 | Q |
| 5 | A | Simone Bianchi | Italy | 7.86 | | | 7.86 | Q |
| 6 | B | János Uzsoki | Hungary | x | 7.53 | 7.84 | 7.84 | Q |
| 7 | A | Siniša Ergotić | Croatia | x | x | 7.83 | 7.83 | Q |
| 8 | A | Gogo Peters | Nigeria | 7.81 | | | 7.81 | Q |
| 8 | B | Aleksandr Glavatskiy | Belarus | 7.81 | | | 7.81 | Q |
| 10 | A | Bogdan Tudor | Romania | 7.80 | | | 7.80 | Q |
| 11 | A | Konstantin Krause | Germany | x | x | 7.79 | 7.79 | Q |
| 12 | A | Sung Hee-jun | South Korea | 7.41 | 7.77 | | 7.77 | Q |
| 13 | A | Nobuharu Asahara | Japan | 7.67 | 7.55 | 7.76 | 7.76 | Q |
| 14 | B | Georg Ackermann | Germany | 7.47 | 7.64 | 7.75 | 7.75 | Q |
| 15 | A | Darius Pemberton | United States | 7.75 | | | 7.75 | Q |
| 16 | A | Spyridon Vasdekis | Greece | x | 7.72 | | 7.72 | Q |
| 17 | B | Jesús Oliván | Spain | 7.56 | 7.71 | | 7.71 | Q |
| 18 | A | György Makó | Hungary | 7.36 | 7.70 | | 7.70 | Q |
| 19 | B | Bogdan Țăruș | Romania | x | 7.55 | 7.67 | 7.67 | |
| 20 | B | Robert Michalík | Czech Republic | x | 7.65 | 7.66 | 7.66 | |
| 21 | B | Xu Bin | China | 7.44 | 7.63 | 7.40w | 7.63 | |
| 22 | A | Franck Zio | Burkina Faso | x | x | 7.63 | 7.63 | |
| 23 | B | Shirak Pogosyan | Armenia | x | x | 7.54 | 7.54 | |
| 24 | B | Yevgeniy Tretyak | Russia | x | 7.53 | 7.46 | 7.54 | |
| 25 | A | Armen Martirosyan | Armenia | 7.51 | – | – | 7.51 | |
| 26 | A | Richard Duncan | Canada | 7.49 | x | 7.49 | 7.49 | |
| 27 | B | Simon Schranz | Switzerland | 7.43 | 6.90 | 7.22 | 7.43 | |
| 28 | B | Craig Furber | Australia | x | x | 7.42 | 7.42 | |
| 29 | B | Hiroyuki Kasahara | Japan | 7.36 | x | 7.37 | 7.37 | |
| 30 | B | Sergio Sauceda | Mexico | x | 7.01 | 7.35 | 7.35 | |
| 31 | A | Nabil Adamou | Algeria | 7.13 | 7.30 | 7.34 | 7.34 | |
| 32 | A | Dariusz Bontruk | Poland | x | x | 7.33 | 7.33 | |
| 33 | B | Ranald Huget | Canada | 7.27 | x | x | 7.27 | |
| 34 | B | Modou Gai | Gambia | 7.03 | 6.86 | 7.14 | 7.14 | |
| 35 | B | Osman Cline-Thomas | Sierra Leone | 6.87 | 7.08 | 6.93 | 7.08 | |
| 36 | B | John Ojeisekhoba | Nigeria | 7.07 | – | – | 7.07 | |
| 37 | A | Inos Mugabe | Zimbabwe | 6.94 | 6.91 | 6.74 | 6.94 | |
| 38 | A | Steve Vinda | Seychelles | 6.89 | 6.46 | 6.45 | 6.89 | |
| 39 | B | Maung Kyaw Htoo Aung | Myanmar | x | 6.77 | x | 6.77 | |
| 40 | B | Lý Ngọc Hải | Vietnam | 6.20 | 6.71 | 5.98 | 6.71 | |
| 41 | A | Wong Chi Fai | Macau | 5.90 | 6.15 | 6.25 | 6.25 | |
| 42 | B | Moussa Illo | Niger | 5.64 | x | 6.20 | 6.20 | |
| 43 | A | Illiap Ngonga | Chad | 6.12 | 5.98 | 6.04 | 6.12 | |
| 44 | B | Kalua McDonald | Malawi | 5.55 | 5.58w | – | 5.58w | |
| | B | Rui Alexandre Brás | Macau | x | x | x | NM | |
| | A | Khaled Othman | Libya | | | | DNS | |
| | A | Cheick Saadbouh Kamara | Mauritania | | | | DNS | |
| | A | William Paasewe | Liberia | | | | DNS | |
| | A | Ahmed Hamdan | Sudan | | | | DNS | |
| | B | Elsadig Fadul Eissa | Sudan | | | | DNS | |

=== Final ===
| Rank | Athlete | Nationality | #1 | #2 | #3 | #4 | #5 | #6 | Result | Notes |
|---|---|---|---|---|---|---|---|---|---|---|
| 1st place, gold medalist(s) | Kirill Sosunov | Russia | 7.76 | 7.72 | 8.21 | 8.15 | 8.08 | x | 8.21 | |
| 2nd place, silver medalist(s) | Georg Ackermann | Germany | x | 8.07 | x | x | 8.21 | 7.88 | 8.21 | |
| 3rd place, bronze medalist(s) | Gregor Cankar | Slovenia | 7.82 | x | 7.97 | 8.18 | 7.60 | x | 8.18 | |
| 4 | Bogdan Tudor | Romania | 8.00 | x | 7.85 | x | 8.11 | 7.89 | 8.11 | |
| 5 | Aleksandr Glavatskiy | Belarus | 7.89 | 7.90 | 7.98 | 8.05 | 8.01 | 8.08w | 8.08w | |
| 6 | Spyridon Vasdekis | Greece | 7.67 | 7.87 | 8.07 | 7.83 | 7.50 | – | 8.07 | |
| 7 | Nobuharu Asahara | Japan | 5.96 | 7.70w | 7.93w | 7.95 | 7.93 | 8.03 | 8.03 | |
| 8 | Darius Pemberton | United States | 7.79 | 7.97 | x | x | x | x | 7.97 | |
| 9 | Simone Bianchi | Italy | 7.83 | 7.73 | 7.86 | | | | 7.86 | |
| 10 | György Makó | Hungary | 7.86 | x | 7.67 | | | | 7.86 | |
| 11 | Chao Chih-Kuo | Chinese Taipei | 7.82 | x | 7.84w | | | | 7.84w | |
| 12 | Jesús Oliván | Spain | 7.78 | 7.53 | 7.63 | | | | 7.78 | |
| 13 | Konstantin Krause | Germany | 7.63 | 7.76 | x | | | | 7.76 | |
| 14 | János Uzsoki | Hungary | 7.48 | 7.50 | 7.68 | | | | 7.68 | |
| 15 | Siniša Ergotić | Croatia | x | 7.61 | x | | | | 7.61 | |
| 16 | Sung Hee-jun | South Korea | 7.482 | x | 7.582 | | | | 7.58w | |
| 17 | Gogo Peters | Nigeria | 7.55 | 7.45 | x | | | | 7.55 | |
| 18 | Sean Robbins | United States | 7.37 | 7.21 | 7.53 | | | | 7.53 | |
