= 2004 World Junior Championships in Athletics – Men's triple jump =

The men's triple jump event at the 2004 World Junior Championships in Athletics was held in Grosseto, Italy, at Stadio Olimpico Carlo Zecchini on 16 and 18 July.

== Medalists ==
Gold	Khotso Mokoena; South Africa
Silver	Zhu Shujing; China
Bronze	Viktor Kuznyetsov; Ukraine

== Results ==
=== Final ===
18 July

Rank	Name	Nationality	Attempts						Result	Notes
Rank	Name	Nationality	1	2	3	4	5	6	Result	Notes
1st place, gold medalist(s)	Khotso Mokoena	South Africa	16.58 (w: -0.1 m/s)	x	16.68 (w: -0.5 m/s)	16.77 (w: -0.3 m/s)	16.62 (w: -0.1 m/s)	14.86 (w: +0.1 m/s)	16.77 (w: -0.3 m/s)	
2nd place, silver medalist(s)	Zhu Shujing	China	16.64 (w: +0.1 m/s)	16.59 (w: +0.1 m/s)	x	16.43 (w: -0.4 m/s)	x	16.35 (w: -0.2 m/s)	16.64 (w: +0.1 m/s)	
3rd place, bronze medalist(s)	Viktor Kuznyetsov	Ukraine	16.58 (w: 0.0 m/s)	16.54 (w: +0.7 m/s)	16.30 (w: +0.8 m/s)	15.98 (w: -0.1 m/s)	15.87 (w: +0.1 m/s)	15.87 (w: -0.1 m/s)	16.58 (w: 0.0 m/s)	
4	Dennis Fernández	Cuba	16.21 (w: +0.1 m/s)	16.30 (w: -0.3 m/s)	16.14 (w: +0.4 m/s)	13.68 (w: -0.5 m/s)	16.20 (w: -0.1 m/s)	15.84 (w: +0.1 m/s)	16.30 (w: -0.3 m/s)	
5	Alwyn Jones	Australia	16.29 (w: +0.5 m/s)	16.03 (w: -0.3 m/s)	16.16 (w: +0.6 m/s)	16.05 (w: -0.2 m/s)	x	x	16.29 (w: +0.5 m/s)	
6	Dmitriy Detsuk	Belarus	16.17 (w: +1.0 m/s)	15.44 (w: 0.0 m/s)	15.82 (w: +1.0 m/s)	15.89 (w: -0.5 m/s)	15.80 (w: 0.0 m/s)	-	16.17 (w: +1.0 m/s)	
7	Andrey Alekseyev	Russia	15.61 (w: +0.8 m/s)	15.78 (w: +1.2 m/s)	x	x	15.86 (w: -0.4 m/s)	15.63 (w: +0.4 m/s)	15.86 (w: -0.4 m/s)	
8	Petar Ivanov	Bulgaria	15.79 (w: +1.1 m/s)	x	15.60 (w: +0.3 m/s)	x	x	x	15.79 (w: +1.1 m/s)	
9	Mohamed Al-Majrashi	Saudi Arabia	15.66 (w: -0.1 m/s)	15.57 (w: -0.2 m/s)	15.73 (w: +0.7 m/s)				15.73 (w: +0.7 m/s)	
10	Andrés Capellán	Spain	15.68 (w: -0.1 m/s)	x	15.62 (w: -0.4 m/s)				15.68 (w: -0.1 m/s)	
11	Ayata Joseph	Antigua and Barbuda	15.63 (w: -0.3 m/s)	x	15.21 (w: +0.1 m/s)				15.63 (w: -0.3 m/s)	
12	Pere Joseph	Spain	15.20 (w: -0.4 m/s)	-	-				15.20 (w: -0.4 m/s)	

=== Qualifications ===
16 July

==== Group A ====
Rank	Name	Nationality	Attempts			Result	Notes
Rank	Name	Nationality	1	2	3	Result	Notes
1	Viktor Kuznyetsov	Ukraine	16.39 (w: +0.2 m/s)	-	-	16.39 (w: +0.2 m/s)	Q
2	Dmitriy Detsuk	Belarus	x	x	16.25 (w: -0.4 m/s)	16.25 (w: -0.4 m/s)	Q
3	Zhu Shujing	China	16.15 (w: -0.2 m/s)	-	-	16.15 (w: -0.2 m/s)	Q
4	Petar Ivanov	Bulgaria	15.06 (w: +0.8 m/s)	16.00 (w: -0.5 m/s)	-	16.00 (w: -0.5 m/s)	Q
5	Andrés Capellán	Spain	15.74 (w: -0.1 m/s)	15.55 (w: 0.0 m/s)	x	15.74 (w: -0.1 m/s)	q
6	Andrey Alekseyev	Russia	15.22 (w: -0.8 m/s)	14.99 (w: +0.3 m/s)	15.73 (w: -0.2 m/s)	15.73 (w: -0.2 m/s)	q
7	Fabien Harmenil	France	15.38 (w: +0.5 m/s)	15.62 (w: +0.1 m/s)	15.72 (w: -0.1 m/s)	15.72 (w: -0.1 m/s)	
8	Ko Dae-Young	South Korea	15.67 (w: -0.2 m/s)	13.88 (w: -0.1 m/s)	14.25 (w: +0.2 m/s)	15.67 (w: -0.2 m/s)	
9	Ali Reza Habibi	Iran	15.31 (w: +0.4 m/s)	15.36 (w: -0.5 m/s)	14.98 (w: +0.2 m/s)	15.36 (w: -0.5 m/s)	
10	Paul Hubbard	United States	x	x	15.34 (w: +0.1 m/s)	15.34 (w: +0.1 m/s)	
11	Teymur Abbasov	Azerbaijan	15.33 (w: +0.2 m/s)	x	15.18 (w: -0.1 m/s)	15.33 (w: +0.2 m/s)	
12	Apóstolos Vlahávas	Greece	14.96 (w: -0.3 m/s)	15.06 (w: -0.1 m/s)	x	15.06 (w: -0.1 m/s)	
13	Taras Moiseyenko	Uzbekistan	14.83 (w: -0.2 m/s)	14.89 (w: +0.5 m/s)	14.87 (w: -0.2 m/s)	14.89 (w: +0.5 m/s)	
14	Dovran Agaliyev	Turkmenistan	x	x	14.77 (w: +0.6 m/s)	14.77 (w: +0.6 m/s)	
15	Mousa Qarqaran	Saudi Arabia	14.70 (w: -0.1 m/s)	x	14.69 (w: +0.2 m/s)	14.70 (w: -0.1 m/s)	

==== Group B ====
Rank	Name	Nationality	Attempts			Result	Notes
Rank	Name	Nationality	1	2	3	Result	Notes
1	Khotso Mokoena	South Africa	15.80 (w: +0.8 m/s)	16.02 (w: +0.1 m/s)	-	16.02 (w: +0.1 m/s)	Q
2	Dennis Fernández	Cuba	16.01 (w: -0.3 m/s)	-	-	16.01 (w: -0.3 m/s)	Q
3	Alwyn Jones	Australia	15.72 (w: +1.2 m/s)	15.93 (w: -0.1 m/s)	15.84 (w: 0.0 m/s)	15.93 (w: -0.1 m/s)	q
4	Pere Joseph	Spain	15.70 (w: +0.5 m/s)	15.85 (w: +0.6 m/s)	15.40 (w: 0.0 m/s)	15.85 (w: +0.6 m/s)	q
5	Mohamed Al-Majrashi	Saudi Arabia	15.16 (w: +0.8 m/s)	15.47 (w: +0.1 m/s)	15.76 (w: +0.2 m/s)	15.76 (w: +0.2 m/s)	q
6	Ayata Joseph	Antigua and Barbuda	15.76 (w: -0.3 m/s)	x	15.42 (w: -0.2 m/s)	15.76 (w: -0.3 m/s)	q
7	Renjith Maheswary	India	14.96 (w: +0.6 m/s)	15.62 (w: +0.8 m/s)	x	15.62 (w: +0.8 m/s)	
8	Kim Deok-Hyeon	South Korea	15.29 (w: -0.3 m/s)	15.37 (w: -0.1 m/s)	15.40 (w: -0.4 m/s)	15.40 (w: -0.4 m/s)	
9	Michael Whitehead	United States	15.10 (w: -0.4 m/s)	15.15 (w: +0.5 m/s)	15.19 (w: +0.2 m/s)	15.19 (w: +0.2 m/s)	
10	Artyom Lobachev	Uzbekistan	15.17 (w: +0.4 m/s)	15.17 (w: 0.0 m/s)	14.99 (w: +0.2 m/s)	15.17 (w: +0.4 m/s)	
11	Steven Marie-Sainte	France	14.95 (w: +0.3 m/s)	14.75 (w: +0.3 m/s)	15.14 (w: +0.2 m/s)	15.14 (w: +0.2 m/s)	
12	Simeon Mars	South Africa	14.82 (w: +0.2 m/s)	15.00 (w: 0.0 m/s)	x	15.00 (w: 0.0 m/s)	
13	Lin Mujie	China	14.81 (w: -0.2 m/s)	-	-	14.81 (w: -0.2 m/s)	
14	Tomas Sickus	Lithuania	x	14.43 (w: +0.2 m/s)	14.62 (w: +0.2 m/s)	14.62 (w: +0.2 m/s)	
15	Maxwell Álvarez	Guatemala	14.53 (w: +0.4 m/s)	x	14.14 (w: -0.1 m/s)	14.53 (w: +0.4 m/s)	
	Azmy Suleiman	Qatar	x	x	-	NM	

== Participation ==
According to an unofficial count, 31 athletes from 23 countries participated in the event.

- Antigua and Barbuda (1)
- Australia (1)
- Azerbaijan (1)
- Belarus (1)
- Bulgaria (1)
- China (2)
- Cuba (1)
- France (2)
- Greece (1)
- Guatemala (1)
- India (1)
- Iran (1)
- Lithuania (1)
- Qatar (1)
- Russia (1)
- Saudi Arabia (2)
- South Africa (2)
- South Korea (2)
- Spain (2)
- Turkmenistan (1)
- Ukraine (1)
- United States (2)
- Uzbekistan (2)
