= Nattaporn Namkanha =

Thai athletics competitor

Medal record

Men's athletics

Representing Thailand

Asian Championships
Gold medal – first place	2000 Jakarta	Triple jump

Nattaporn Namkanha (Thai: ณัฐพล นามกัณหา, born 15 September 1971) is a retired Thai long jumper and triple jumper who was a mainstay on the continental level.

== Triple jump ==
In the triple jump he finished eighth at the 1998 Asian Championships, won the bronze medal at the 1998 Asian Games, won the gold medal at the 2000 Asian Championships, finished seventh at the 2002 Asian Championships, eighth at the 2002 Asian Games, eighth at the 2003 Asian Championships, eighth at the 2005 Asian Championships, fourth at the 2005 Asian Indoor Games and fourth at the 2006 Asian Indoor Championships. On the regional scene he won the gold medal at the 1999, 2001 and 2003 Southeast Asian Games.

His personal best jump is 16.66 metres, achieved in May 2002 in Bangkok. This is the Thai record.

== Long jump ==
In the long jump he finished tenth at the 1998 Asian Games, seventh at the 1998 Asian Championships and fifth at the 2000 Athletics Championships. He also competed at the 2003 Asian Championships without reaching the final. On the regional scene he won the gold medal at the 2001 and 2003 Southeast Asian Games.

His personal best jump is 7.87 metres, achieved in May 1998 in Kaoshiung.
