= Héctor Dairo Fuentes =

Cuban triple jumper (born 1988)

Héctor Dayron Fuentes Valdés (born 19 May 1988 in Marianao) is a Cuban triple jumper. His personal best jump is 17.43 metres, achieved in February 2008 in Havana. In the long jump he has 7.94 metres outdoors, achieved in May 2008 in Barquisimeto, and 7.95 metres indoors, achieved in February 2008 in Chemnitz.

== Achievements ==
Year	Competition	Venue	Position	Event	Notes
Representing Cuba
2005	World Youth Championships	Marrakesh, Morocco	1st	Triple jump	16.63 m
2007	Pan American Junior Championships	São Paulo, Brazil	8th	Triple jump	16.61 m
2008	Central American and Caribbean Championships	Cali, Colombia	8th	Long jump	7.44 m
2008	Central American and Caribbean Championships	Cali, Colombia	2nd	Triple jump	17.23 m
2008	Olympic Games	Beijing, China	12th	Triple jump	16.28 m
2009	Universiade	Belgrade, Serbia	2nd	Triple jump	17.13 m
