= Athletics at the 2009 Summer Universiade – Men's triple jump =

The men's triple jump event at the 2009 Summer Universiade was held on 7–9 July.

== Medalists ==
Gold	Silver	Bronze
Nelson Évora; Portugal	Héctor Dairo Fuentes; Cuba	Vladimir Letnicov; Moldova

== Results ==
=== Qualification ===
Qualification: 16.50 m (Q) or at least 12 best (q) qualified for the final.

Rank	Group	Athlete	Nationality	#1	#2	#3	Result	Notes
1	B	Héctor Dairo Fuentes	Cuba	16.46	16.32	16.85	16.85	Q
2	A	Roman Valiyev	Kazakhstan	x	16.13	16.66	16.66	Q
3	B	Yevhen Semenenko	Ukraine	16.66			16.66	Q, PB
4	A	Henry Frayne	Australia	x	16.62		16.62	Q
4	B	Vladimir Letnicov	Moldova	16.62			16.62	Q
6	A	Kim Deok-Hyeon	South Korea	16.58			16.58	Q
7	B	Nelson Évora	Portugal	16.57			16.57	Q
8	A	Alwyn Jones	Australia	x	16.42	x	16.42	q
9	A	Dong Bin	China	16.35	15.83	x	16.35	q
10	B	Klim Vorobiev	Russia	16.15	15.96	16.31	16.31	q
11	A	Yevgeniy Ektov	Kazakhstan	16.24	x	x	16.24	q
12	A	Mantas Dilys	Lithuania	x	x	16.20	16.20	q, SB
13	A	Dmytro Tyden	Ukraine	16.19	15.79	15.72	16.19	
14	B	Zhivko Petkov	Bulgaria	15.41	15.47	16.00	16.00	
15	B	Li Hongpeng	China	15.33	15.73	15.88	15.88	
16	A	Roger Haitengi	Namibia	15.84	14.24	x	15.84	
17	A	Sergey Yarmak	Russia	15.80	15.59	x	15.80	
18	B	Mamadou Gueye	Senegal	15.48	15.42	15.72	15.72	
19	A	Marius Alin Anghel	Romania	x	x	15.71	15.71	
20	B	Tumelo Thagane	South Africa	15.34	15.33	15.68	15.68	
21	B	Andrés Capellán	Spain	15.56	15.01	15.55	15.56	
22	B	Aleksi Tammentie	Finland	x	x	15.54	15.54	
23	A	Kosta Randjić	Serbia	x	15.45	x	15.45	
24	B	Sief El Islem Temacini	Algeria	15.43	14.97	15.13	15.43	
25	A	Peder Pawel Nielsen	Denmark	15.32	x	x	15.32	
26	B	Juan Carlos Nájera	Guatemala	14.94	14.86	x	14.94	
27	B	Branko Đuričić	Serbia	14.84	14.42	x	14.84	
28	B	Thodoris Mathioudakis	Greece	14.40	x	14.27	14.40	
29	A	Rober Martínez	Colombia	14.40	x	–	14.40	
30	A	Mattias Brunstrom	Sweden	x	13.29	x	13.29	
	A	Zacharias Arnos	Cyprus	x	x	x	NM	

=== Final ===
Rank	Athlete	Nationality	#1	#2	#3	#4	#5	#6	Result	Notes
1st place, gold medalist(s)	Nelson Évora	Portugal	17.09	x	16.95	17.07	17.14	17.22	17.22	
2nd place, silver medalist(s)	Héctor Dairo Fuentes	Cuba	16.52	17.13	16.42	16.09	16.14	17.13	17.13	
3rd place, bronze medalist(s)	Vladimir Letnicov	Moldova	16.75	16.80	x	x	x	x	16.80	
4	Yevhen Semenenko	Ukraine	16.26	16.42	16.73	16.80	16.30	15.00	16.80	PB
5	Kim Deok-Hyeon	South Korea	16.54	16.59	16.75	16.36	x	16.37	16.75	
6	Yevgeniy Ektov	Kazakhstan	16.73	x	16.62	x	x	16.44	16.73	
7	Klim Vorobiev	Russia	16.30	16.48	16.67	x	x	x	16.67	
8	Roman Valiyev	Kazakhstan	14.40	16.15	16.59	x	x	x	16.59	
9	Alwyn Jones	Australia	16.53	16.32	16.52				16.53	
10	Mantas Dilys	Lithuania	16.42	x	16.28				16.42	SB
11	Dong Bin	China	x	x	16.26				16.26	
12	Henry Frayne	Australia	x	16.11	x				16.11	
