= Sung Hee-jun =

South Korean long jumper

Personal information
- Born: 8 June 1974 (age 52) Seocheon County, South Korea

Sport
- Sport: Track and field

Sung Hee-Jun (born 8 June 1974) is a retired South Korea long jumper.

He finished sixteenth at the 1995 Summer Universiade and fourth at the 1998 Asian Games. He also competed at the 1992 World Junior Championships, the 1996 Olympic Games, the 1997 World Championships, the 1999 World Championships and the 2000 Olympic Games without reaching the final.

His personal best time was 8.01 metres, achieved in June 1998 in Chungju.
