= Athletics at the 2003 Summer Universiade – Men's triple jump =

The men's triple jump event at the 2003 Summer Universiade was held on 30 August in Daegu, South Korea.

== Results ==
Rank	Athlete	Nationality	#1	#2	#3	#4	#5	#6	Result	Notes
1st place, gold medalist(s)	Gu Junjie	China	16.13	16.71	x	x	x	16.90	16.90	
2nd place, silver medalist(s)	Viktor Yastrebov	Ukraine	16.61	16.88	x	16.54	16.66	x	16.88	
3rd place, bronze medalist(s)	Yevgeniy Plotnir	Russia	16.53	16.75	16.41	16.82	16.37	x	16.82	
4	Kazuyoshi Ishikawa	Japan	16.68	16.19	x	x	x	16.78	16.78	
5	Daniel Donovici	Romania	16.71	x	16.36	16.34	x	16.54	16.71	
6	Mykola Savolaynen	Ukraine	16.60	x	x	16.56	x	x	16.60	
7	Jacob McReynolds	Australia	16.42	16.23	x	x	x	x	16.42	
8	Viktor Gushchinskiy	Russia	16.16	15.30	16.40	16.12	16.18	14.78	16.40	
9	Li Yanxi	China	15.75	16.25	x				16.25	
10	Vladimir Letnicov	Moldova	x	16.18	x				16.18	
11	Péter Tölgyesi	Hungary	16.08	15.69	16.02				16.08	
12	Andrej Batagelj	Slovenia	15.79	15.97	x				15.97	
13	Lee Kang-min	South Korea	x	15.07	15.51				15.51	
14	Urban Matoh	Slovenia	x	15.46	x				15.46	
15	Ilja Tumorin	Estonia	x	15.35	x				15.35	
16	Si Kuan Wong	Macau	14.73	14.59	14.76				14.76	
17	Nader Rashed Ali Sulaiman	United Arab Emirates	x	x	14.41				14.41	
18	Álvaro Paiz	Guatemala	14.35	x	x				14.35	
	Taher Hassan Mohd Al-Taheri	United Arab Emirates	x	x	x				NM	
	Trent Armstrong	Marshall Islands	x	x	x				NM	
	Lam Chi Hang	Macau	x	x	x				NM	
	Abdou Demba Lam	Senegal							DNS	
