= Wu Ji (athlete) =

Chinese triple jumper

Medal record

Men's athletics

Representing China

Asian Championships
Bronze medal – third place	2003 Manila	Triple jump

Wu Ji (born 14 August 1978) is a Chinese triple jumper. His personal best jump is 17.04 metres, achieved in November 2001 in Guangzhou.

== Achievements ==
Year	Competition	Venue	Position	Notes
Representing China
2002	Asian Games	Busan, South Korea	7th	15.58 m
2003	Asian Championships	Manila, Philippines	3rd	16.67 m
2003	Afro-Asian Games	Hyderabad, India	4th	15.76 m
