= Track and field at the 2015 Military World Games – Men's triple jump =

The men's triple jump event at the 2015 Military World Games was held on 7 October at the KAFAC Sports Complex.

== Records ==
Prior to this competition, the existing world and CISM record were as follows:

World Record	Jonathan Edwards (GBR)	18.29	Gothenburg, Sweden	7 August 1995
CISM World Record	João Carlos de Oliveira (BRA)	17.38		1976

== Schedule ==
Date	Time	Round
7 October 2015	15:05	Final

== Medalists ==
Gold	Silver	Bronze
Dmitriy Sorokin; Russia	Aleksey Fyodorov; Russia	Adrian Swiderski; Poland

== Results ==
=== Final ===
Rank	Athlete	Nationality	#1	#2	#3	#4	#5	#6	Mark	Notes
1st place, gold medalist(s)	Dmitriy Sorokin	Russia	x	16.88 (-0.3 m/s)	x	x	17.01 (+1.5 m/s)	x	17.01 (+1.5 m/s)	
2nd place, silver medalist(s)	Aleksey Fyodorov	Russia	16.56 (+1.8 m/s)	16.15 (+1.3 m/s)	15.78 (+0.2 m/s)	x	x	x	16.56 (+1.8 m/s)	
3rd place, bronze medalist(s)	Adrian Świderski	Poland	16.38 (+0.5 m/s)	x	16.44 (+0.9 m/s)	16.55 (+1.1 m/s)	x	x	16.55 (+1.1 m/s)	
4	Rashid Al-Mannai	Qatar	14.26 (+0.2 m/s)	16.27 (+1.0 m/s)	16.27 (+0.3 m/s)	x	x	15.91 (+0.5 m/s)	16.27 (+1.0 m/s)	
5	Kim Dong-han	South Korea	x	15.86 (+0.2 m/s)	x	16.15 (+0.5 m/s)	x	15.83 (+0.4 m/s)	16.15 (+0.5 m/s)	
6	Simo Lipsanen	Finland	x	15.48 (+2.0 m/s)	15.85 (+0.2 m/s)	x	15.62 (+1.0 m/s)	15.64 (0.0 m/s)	15.85 (+0.2 m/s)	
7	Elijah Kiplagat Kimitei	Kenya	15.17 (+0.5 m/s)	15.54 (+1.2 m/s)	15.68 (+0.2 m/s)	15.36 (0.0 m/s)	–	x	15.68 (+0.2 m/s)	
8	A.V.Rakesh Babu	India	x	x	15.64 (+1.1 m/s)	15.17 (+0.4 m/s)	–	14.22 (+0.9 m/s)	15.64 (+1.1 m/s)	
9	Lu Tianjie	China	15.18 (+0.1 m/s)	–	–				15.18 (+0.1 m/s)	
10	Bheesham Singh	India	14.74 (-0.6 m/s)	15.04 (+1.3 m/s)	14.91 (+1.1 m/s)				15.04 (+1.3 m/s)	
11	Clifton Olymph	Suriname	x	14.33 (+1.3 m/s)	x				14.33 (+1.3 m/s)	
	Yu Zhenwei	China							DNS	
