= Kazuyoshi Ishikawa =

Japanese triple jumper (born 1982)

Personal information
- Born: 6 November 1982 (age 43) Nagano Prefecture, Japan
- Education: University of Tsukuba
- Height: 178 cm (5 ft 10 in)
- Weight: 70 kg (154 lb)

Sport
- Country: Japan
- Sport: Track and field
- Event: Triple jump
- Personal best: 16.98 (Yamaguchi 2004) NUR
Medal record
Men's athletics
Representing Japan
Asian Championships
Gold medal – first place	2003 Manila	Triple jump
Silver medal – second place	2002 Colombo	Triple jump
Silver medal – second place	2005 Incheon	Triple jump

Kazuyoshi Ishikawa (石川和義, Ishikawa Kazuyoshi; born 6 November 1982) is a Japanese triple jumper. His personal best jump is 16.98 metres, achieved in October 2004 in Yamaguchi. This is the current Japanese university record.

He finished sixth at the 2002 World Cup and fourth at the 2003 Summer Universiade. At the Asian Championships he won a gold medal in 2003 and silver medals in 2002 and 2005. He also competed at the 2005 World Championships without reaching the final.

== Personal best ==
Measure (m)	Wind (m/s)	Competition	Venue	Date	Notes
16.98	+1.5	Naoto Tajima Memorial	Yamaguchi, Japan	10 October 2004	Current NUR

== International competitions ==
Year	Competition	Venue	Position	Notes
Representing Japan and Asia (World Cup only)
2000	World Junior Championships	Santiago, Chile	16th (q)	15.51 m (wind: +0.6 m/s)
2001	Asian Junior Championships	Bandar Seri Begawan, Brunei	2nd	15.92 m (wind: +1.5 m/s)
2002	World Cup	Madrid, Spain	6th	16.50 m (wind: +1.1 m/s)
2002	Asian Championships	Colombo, Sri Lanka	2nd	16.42 m (wind: -0.5 m/s)
2003	Universiade	Daegu, South Korea	4th	16.78 m (wind: +0.5 m/s)
2003	Asian Championships	Manila, Philippines	1st	16.72 m (wind: +0.1 m/s)
2005	World Championships	Helsinki, Finland	22nd (q)	16.33 m (wind: +2.3 m/s)
2005	Asian Championships	Incheon, South Korea	2nd	16.88 m (wind: +1.1 m/s)
2009	Asian Championships	Guangzhou, China	7th	15.63 m (wind: +1.9 m/s)

== National titles ==
- Japanese Championships
  - Triple jump: 2005, 2008, 2014, 2015
