= Athletics at the 1998 Asian Games – Men's long jump =

Athletics event

Men's long jump at the 1998 Asian Games
- Venue: Thammasat Stadium
- Dates: 14–15 December 1998
- Competitors: 18 from 13 nations

Medalists
gold medal	Masaki Morinaga	Japan
silver medal	Liu Hongning	China
bronze medal	Abdulrahman Al-Nubi	Qatar

The men's long jump competition at the 1998 Asian Games in Bangkok, Thailand was held on 14 and 15 December at the Thammasat Stadium.

== Schedule ==
All times are Indochina Time (UTC+07:00)

Date	Time	Event
Monday, 14 December 1998	15:00	Qualification
Tuesday, 15 December 1998	14:20	Final

== Results ==
Legend

- NM — No mark

=== Qualification ===
- Qualification: Qualifying performance 7.60 (Q) or at least 12 best performers (q) advance to the final.

Rank	Group	Athlete	Result	Notes
1	B	Abdulrahman Al-Nubi (QAT)	7.75	Q
2	B	Masaki Morinaga (JPN)	7.74	Q
3	A	Sung Hee-jun (KOR)	7.72	Q
4	B	Konstantin Sarnatskiy (UZB)	7.63	Q
5	A	Tan Zhengze (CHN)	7.57	q
6	B	Liu Hongning (CHN)	7.53	q
7	A	Boonyarit Phuksachat (THA)	7.50	q
8	B	Ahmed Al-Moamari (OMA)	7.45	q
9	B	Yevgeniy Petin (UZB)	7.35	q
10	A	Jahad Al-Sheikh (OMA)	7.29	q
11	B	Nattaporn Namkanha (THA)	7.18	q
12	A	Takeshi Ichikawa (JPN)	7.17	q
13	B	Md Boni Amin (BAN)	7.12	
14	A	Nguyễn Ngọc Quân (VIE)	7.03	
15	A	Sisomphone Vongpharkdy (LAO)	6.90	
16	A	Mohammad Chaaban (LIB)	6.38	
17	A	Aleksandr Kozlov (TJK)	6.00	
—	B	Chao Chih-kuo (TPE)	NM	

=== Final ===
Rank	Athlete	Result	Notes
1st place, gold medalist(s)	Masaki Morinaga (JPN)	8.10	
2nd place, silver medalist(s)	Liu Hongning (CHN)	8.05	
3rd place, bronze medalist(s)	Abdulrahman Al-Nubi (QAT)	7.99	
4	Sung Hee-jun (KOR)	7.95	
5	Tan Zhengze (CHN)	7.89	
6	Konstantin Sarnatskiy (UZB)	7.78	
7	Takeshi Ichikawa (JPN)	7.55	
8	Jahad Al-Sheikh (OMA)	7.44	
9	Ahmed Al-Moamari (OMA)	7.37	
10	Nattaporn Namkanha (THA)	7.29	
11	Boonyarit Phuksachat (THA)	7.01	
—	Yevgeniy Petin (UZB)	NM	
