= Adrian Świderski =

Polish triple jumper (born 1986)

Personal information
- Nationality: Polish

Sport
- Sport: Track and field
- Event: Triple jump
Medal record
European Athletics U23 Championships
Silver medal – second place	2007 Debrecen	triple jump

Adrian Świderski (born 27 September 1986) is a Polish triple jumper.

He won the silver medal at the 2007 European U23 Championships, finished seventh at the 2011 Military World Games and won the bronze medal at the 2015 Military World Games. He also competed at the 2015 European Indoor Championships and the 2017 European Indoor Championships without reaching the final.

His personal best jump is 16.81 metres, achieved in May 2015 in Biala Podlaska.

== International competitions ==
Year	Competition	Venue	Position	Event	Notes
Representing Poland
2007	European U23 Championships	Debrecen, Hungary	2nd	Triple jump	16.29 m
2015	European Indoor Championships	Prague, Czech Republic	12th (q)	Triple jump	16.12 m
2015	Military World Games	Mungyeong, South Korea	8th	Long jump	7.19 m
2015	Military World Games	Mungyeong, South Korea	3rd	Triple jump	16.55 m
2017	European Indoor Championships	Belgrade, Serbia	15th (q)	Triple jump	16.01 m
2021	European Indoor Championships	Toruń, Poland	8th	Triple jump	16.36 m
2022	European Championships	Munich, Germany	16th (q)	Triple jump	15.97 m
