= Zhu Shujing =

Chinese triple jumper

Medal record

Men's athletics

Representing China

Asian Indoor Championships
Gold medal – first place	2004 Tehran	Triple jump

Zhu Shujing (born 24 May 1985) is a Chinese triple jumper.

He won the silver medal at the 2004 World Junior Championships and finished seventh at the 2006 Asian Games. At the 11th Chinese National Games in 2009 he scored a personal best to take the silver behind Li Yanxi.

His personal best jump is 17.41 metres, achieved in October 2009 in Jinan.

== Competition record ==
Year	Competition	Venue	Position	Notes
Representing China
2004	Asian Indoor Championships	Tehran, Iran	1st	16.57 m
2004	World Junior Championships	Grosseto, Italy	2nd	16.64 m (wind: +0.1 m/s)
2004	Asian Games	Doha, Qatar	7th	16.06 m
2009	Asian Championships	Guangzhou, China	2nd	16.67 m
