= 2000 Asian Athletics Championships – Men's triple jump =

The men's triple jump event at the 2000 Asian Athletics Championships was held in Jakarta, Indonesia on 29 August.

== Results ==
Rank	Name	Nationality	#1	#2	#3	#4	#5	#6	Result	Notes
1st place, gold medalist(s)	Nattaporn Nomkanha	Thailand	16.14	16.21	x	16.15	16.29	16.53	16.53	NR
2nd place, silver medalist(s)	Maksim Smetanin	Kyrgyzstan	15.50	15.19	15.56	x	16.19	16.33	16.33	
3rd place, bronze medalist(s)	Salem Al-Ahmadi	Saudi Arabia	16.14	15.95	16.24	x	16.20	16.45	16.24	
4	Mohammed Hamdi Awadh	Qatar	16.24	14.22	16.01	x	x	x	16.24	
5	Takashi Komatsu	Japan							16.22	
6	Ibrahim Mohamedin	Qatar							16.21	
7	Hussein Abdullah Al-Yoha	Kuwait							16.18	
8	Yan Xueying	China							16.13	
9	Mohamed Abdelbaki	Jordan							15.65	
10	Yevgeniy Petin	Uzbekistan							15.53	
11	Mohamed Adam Mohamed	Saudi Arabia							15.47	
12	Nguyen Mai Linh	Vietnam							14.89	
13	Edi Mohd Junaedi	Indonesia							14.85	
14	Sugeng Jatmiko	Indonesia							14.78	
15	Siti Ram Chaudhari	Nepal							14.66	
	Wang Cheng	China	x	–	–				NM	
