= Alin Anghel =

Romanian triple jumper

Marius Alin Anghel (born 13 May 1986) is a retired Romanian triple jumper.

He finished sixth at the 2007 European U23 Championships and won the silver medal at the 2009 Jeux de la Francophonie. He also competed at the 2007 Summer Universiade, the 2009 European Indoor Championships and the 2011 European Indoor Championships without reaching the final.

His personal best jump is 16.65 metres, achieved in June 2009 in Sofia. Indoors he has 16.69 metres, achieved in February 2010 in Bucuresti.
