= Athletics at the 2002 Asian Games – Men's triple jump =

Men's triple jump at the 2002 Asian Games
- Venue: Busan Asiad Main Stadium
- Date: 9 October 2002
- Competitors: 10 from 9 nations

Medalists
gold medal	Salem Al-Ahmadi	Saudi Arabia
silver medal	Lao Jianfeng	China
bronze medal	Takashi Komatsu	Japan

The men's triple jump competition at the 2002 Asian Games in Busan, South Korea was held on 9 October at the Busan Asiad Main Stadium.

== Schedule ==
All times are Korea Standard Time (UTC+09:00)

Date	Time	Event
Wednesday, 9 October 2002	15:00	Final

== Records ==
Prior to this competition, the existing world, Asian and Games records were as follows.

World Record	Jonathan Edwards (GBR)	18.29	Gothenburg, Sweden	7 August 1995
Asian Record	Oleg Sakirkin (KAZ)	17.35	Moscow, Russia	5 June 1994
Games Record	Zou Sixin (CHN)	17.31	Beijing, China	3 October 1990

== Results ==
Rank	Athlete	Attempt						Result	Notes
Rank	Athlete	1	2	3	4	5	6	Result	Notes
1st place, gold medalist(s)	Salem Al-Ahmadi (KSA)	15.74 −0.8	X	16.41 +0.8	X	16.60 +0.2	X	16.60	
2nd place, silver medalist(s)	Lao Jianfeng (CHN)	X	16.57 +0.4	16.56 +0.9	X	X	16.39 −0.3	16.57	
3rd place, bronze medalist(s)	Takashi Komatsu (JPN)	15.48 +0.2	X	16.34 +1.0	X	X	X	16.34	
4	Mohamed Hamdi (QAT)	X	15.89 +0.1	X	X	X	16.01 −0.3	16.01	
5	Lee Kang-min (KOR)	X	15.91 +0.7	X	X	15.88 +0.2	15.93; 0.0	15.93	
6	Khaled Al-Bakheet (KUW)	15.52 +0.2	X	15.75 +0.2	15.54 +0.2	X	X	15.75	
7	Wu Ji (CHN)	15.58 +0.5	X	—	—	—	—	15.58	
8	Nattaporn Namkanha (THA)	14.83 +0.6	X	15.45 −0.1	15.36 +0.3	15.24 −0.6	X	15.45	
9	Sita Ram Mahato (NEP)	14.20 +0.3	X	14.59 −0.5				14.59	
10	Si Kuan Wong (MAC)	14.31 +0.1	14.02 +0.2	14.26 −0.2				14.31	
