= Gu Junjie =

Chinese triple jumper (born 1985)

Personal information
- Born: May 5, 1985 (age 41)
Medal record
Men's athletics
Representing China
Asian Championships
Gold medal – first place	2005 Incheon	Triple jump
Silver medal – second place	2003 Manila	Triple jump

Gu Junjie (born 5 May 1985 in Sichuan) is a Chinese triple jumper. His personal best jump is 17.23 metres, achieved in September 2004 in Hefei.

He finished fourth at the 2000 World Junior Championships, won the gold medal at the 2003 Summer Universiade, the silver medal at the 2003 Asian Championships and another gold at the 2005 Asian Championships. He also competed at the 2007 World Championships and the 2008 World Indoor Championships without reaching the final.

== Competition record ==
Year	Competition	Venue	Position	Notes
Representing China
2000	World Junior Championships	Santiago, Chile	4th	16.26 m (wind: +0.7 m/s)
2001	East Asian Games	Osaka, Japan	1st	16.56 m
2002	Asian Junior Championships	Bangkok, Thailand	1st	16.73 m
2003	Universiade	Daegu, South Korea	1st	16.90 m
2003	Asian Championships	Manila, Philippines	2nd	16.68 m
2004	World Indoor Championships	Budapest, Hungary	17th (q)	16.40 m
2005	Asian Championships	Incheon, South Korea	1st	16.90 m (w)
2007	World Championships	Osaka, Japan	14th (q)	16.58 m
2008	World Indoor Championships	Valencia, Spain	13th (q)	16.25 m
2008	Olympic Games	Beijing, China	34th (q)	15.94 m

Records
Preceded by	World youth record holder – Men's triple jump 26 September 2004 – 1 February 2014	Succeeded by Lázaro Martínez
