= Aleksi Tammentie =

Finnish triple jumper

Aleksi Tammentie (born 6 August 1986) is a retired Finnish triple jumper.

He finished fourth at the 2013 Summer Universiade. He competed at the 2009 Summer Universiade, the 2012 European Championships and the 2014 European Championships without reaching the final. Tammentie became Finnish champion every year from 2008 through 2014, and Finnish indoor champion seven times between 2007 and 2015.

His personal best jump is 16.61 metres, achieved in June 2014 in Jämsä.
