= Takashi Komatsu =

Japanese triple jumper

Medal record

Men's athletics

Representing Japan

Asian Championships
Bronze medal – third place	1998 Fukuoka	Triple jump

Takashi Komatsu (小松 隆志, Komatsu Takashi; born 30 December 1967) is a male triple jumper from Japan. His personal best jump is 16.65 metres, achieved in October 2003 in Hyderabad.

== International competitions ==
Representing Japan
Year	Competition	Venue	Position	Event	Notes
1994	Asian Games	Hiroshima, Japan	2nd	16.88 m	
1997	East Asian Games	Busan, South Korea	3rd	16.39 m	
1998	Asian Championships	Fukuoka, Japan	3rd	16.38 m	
2000	Asian Championships	Jakarta, Indonesia	5th	16.22 m	
2002	Asian Games	Busan, South Korea	3rd	16.34 m	
2003	Afro-Asian Games	Hyderabad, India	1st	16.65 m	
