= Athletics at the 1998 Asian Games – Men's triple jump =

Athletics event

Men's triple jump at the 1998 Asian Games
- Venue: Thammasat Stadium
- Dates: 19 December 1998
- Competitors: 11 from 10 nations

Medalists
gold medal	Sergey Arzamasov	Kazakhstan
silver medal	Duan Qifeng	China
bronze medal	Nattaporn Namkanha	Thailand

The men's triple jump competition at the 1998 Asian Games in Bangkok, Thailand was held on 19 December at the Thammasat Stadium.

== Schedule ==
All times are Indochina Time (UTC+07:00)

Date	Time	Event
Saturday, 19 December 1998	10:00	Final

== Results ==
Legend

- NM — No mark

Rank	Athlete	Result	Notes
1st place, gold medalist(s)	Sergey Arzamasov (KAZ)	17.00	
2nd place, silver medalist(s)	Duan Qifeng (CHN)	16.98	
3rd place, bronze medalist(s)	Nattaporn Namkanha (THA)	16.42	
4	Takanori Sugibayashi (JPN)	16.39	
5	Yevgeniy Petin (UZB)	16.13	
6	Marzouk Al-Yoha (KUW)	15.56	
7	Mohammad Abdelbaqi (JOR)	15.32	
8	Boonreung Thaveesri (THA)	15.12	
9	Sisomphone Vongpharkdy (LAO)	13.99	
—	Mohamed Hamdi (QAT)	NM	
—	Maksim Smetanin (KGZ)	NM	
