= Vladimir Letnicov =

Moldovan triple jumper

Vladimir Letnicov (born 7 October 1981 in Chişinău) is a Moldovan triple jumper. His personal best jump is 17.06 metres, achieved in June 2002 in Belgrade.

He finished ninth at the 2003 World Indoor Championships and eighth at the 2005 Summer Universiade. He also competed at the 2000 World Junior Championships, the 2002 European Championships, the 2005 European Indoor Championships as well as the Olympic Games in 2004 and 2008, but failed to qualify for the final round.

== Competition record ==
Year	Competition	Venue	Position	Event	Notes
Representing Moldova
2000	World Junior Championships	Santiago, Chile	20th (q)	Long jump	7.16 m (-0.3 m/s)
2000	World Junior Championships	Santiago, Chile	18th (q)	Triple jump	15.35 m (+0.2 m/s)
2001	European U23 Championships	Amsterdam, Netherlands	10th	Triple jump	15.99 m (+0.1 m/s)
2002	European Championships	Munich, Germany	18th (q)	Triple jump	16.09 m
2003	World Indoor Championships	Birmingham, United Kingdom	9th	Triple jump	16.20 m
2003	European U23 Championships	Bydgoszcz, Poland	10th	Triple jump	15.78 m (wind: 0.6 m/s)
2003	Universiade	Daegu, South Korea	10th	Triple jump	16.18 m
2004	Olympic Games	Athens, Greece	32nd (q)	Triple jump	16.25 m
2005	European Indoor Championships	Madrid, Spain	13th (q)	Triple jump	16.04 m
2005	Universiade	İzmir, Turkey	8th	Triple jump	16.14 m
2008	Olympic Games	Beijing, China	24th (q)	Triple jump	16.62 m
2009	European Indoor Championships	Turin, Italy	9th (q)	Triple jump	16.41 m
2009	Universiade	Belgrade, Serbia	3rd	Triple jump	16.80 m
2009	World Championships	Berlin, Germany	40th (q)	Triple jump	15.88 m
2010	European Championships	Barcelona, Spain	12th	Triple jump	16.37 m
2011	European Indoor Championships	Paris, France	13th (q)	Triple jump	16.32 m
2013	European Indoor Championships	Gothenburg, Sweden	11th (q)	Triple jump	16.46 m
2014	World Indoor Championships	Sopot, Poland	16th (q)	Triple jump	16.28 m
2014	European Championships	Zurich, Switzerland	16th (q)	Triple jump	16.28 m
2015	European Indoor Championships	Prague, Czech Republic	10th (q)	Triple jump	16.18 m
2016	European Championships	Amsterdam, Netherlands	26th (q)	Triple jump	15.98 m
2016	Olympic Games	Rio de Janeiro, Brazil	38th (q)	Triple jump	15.29 m
