= Mantas Dilys =

Lithuanian triple jumper (born 1984)

Mantas Dilys (born 30 March 1984) is a Lithuanian triple jumper, who also competed as decathlete. His personal record is 16.68 metres, reached at 2009 in Kaunas.

He represented Lithuania in 2009 World Championships in Athletics without reaching the final.

== Achievements ==
Year	Competition	Venue	Position	Event	Notes
2001	World Youth Championships	Debrecen, Hungary	14th	Ocatathlon	5542 pts
2003	European Junior Championships	Tampere, Finland	5th	Triple Jump	15.57 m
2005	European U23 Championships	Erfurt, Germany	12th	Triple Jump	15.42 m (wind: +1.1 m/s)
2005	Universiade	İzmir, Turkey	11th	Triple Jump	15.63 m
2007	European Indoor Championships	Birmingham, United Kingdom	18th (q)	Triple Jump	15.65 m
2007	Universiade	Bangkok, Thailand	8th	Triple Jump	16.06 m
2009	Universiade	Belgrade, Serbia	14th (q)	Long Jump	7.42 m
2009	Universiade	Belgrade, Serbia	10th	Triple Jump	16.42 m
2009	World Championships	Berlin, Germany	36th (q)	Triple Jump	16.09 m
2010	European Championships	Barcelona, Spain	21st (q)	Triple Jump	16.32 m
2011	Universiade	Shenzhen, China	17th (q)	Triple Jump	15.88 m
2012	European Championships	Helsinki, Finland	–	Triple Jump	NM

In addition, he is a three times National Championships medalist.
