= Salem Al-Ahmadi =

Saudi Arabian triple jumper

Medal record

Men's athletics

Representing Saudi Arabia

Asian Championships
Gold medal – first place	2002 Colombo	Triple jump
Bronze medal – third place	2000 Jakarta	Triple jump

Salem Mouled Al-Ahmadi (born 12 September 1969) is a Saudi Arabian triple jumper. His personal best jump is 17.07 metres, achieved in May 1997 in Riyadh.

He won the bronze medal at the 2000 Asian Championships, the gold medals at the 2002 Asian Games and the 2002 Asian Championships and finished fifth at the 2005 Asian Championships. He also competed at the 1997 World Indoor Championships, the 1999 World Championships, the 2000 Olympic Games, the 2003 World Championships and the 2004 Olympic Games without reaching the final.

== Competition record ==
Year	Competition	Venue	Position	Event	Notes
Representing Saudi Arabia
1994	Asian Games	Hiroshima, Japan	9th	Triple jump	15.78 m
1995	World Championships	Gothenburg, Sweden	–	Triple jump	NM
1996	Olympic Games	Atlanta, United States	25th (q)	Triple jump	16.30 m
1997	World Indoor Championships	Paris, France	19th (q)	Triple jump	16.30 m
1999	World Championships	Seville, Spain	30th (q)	Triple jump	16.24 m
2000	Asian Championships	Jakarta, Indonesia	3rd	Triple jump	16.24 m
2000	Olympic Games	Sydney, Australia	32nd (q)	Triple jump	15.99 m
2002	West Asian Games	Kuwait City, Kuwait	1st	Triple jump	16.50 m
2002	Asian Championships	Colombo, Sri Lanka	1st	Triple jump	16.61 m
2002	Asian Games	Busan, South Korea	1st	Triple jump	16.60 m
2003	World Championships	Paris, France	23rd (q)	Triple jump	14.66 m
2004	Olympic Games	Athens, Greece	35th (q)	Triple jump	16.16 m
2004	Pan Arab Games	Algiers, Algeria	3rd	Triple jump	16.24 m
2005	Islamic Solidarity Games	Mecca, Saudi Arabia	4th	Triple jump	15.92 m
2005	Asian Championships	Incheon, South Korea	5th	Triple jump	16.26 m
