= Maksim Smetanin =

Kyrgyzstani athlete

Personal information
- Born: 17 February 1974 (age 52)

Sport
- Country: Kyrgyzstan
- Sport: Athletics
- Events: Triple jump; Long jump
Medal record
Men's athletics
Representing Kyrgyzstan
Asian Championships
Silver medal – second place	2000 Jakarta	Triple jump

Maxim Smetanin (born 17 February 1974) is a retired Kyrgyzstani triple jumper. His personal best jump is 16.71 metres, achieved in July 2000 in Bishkek.

He won the silver medal at the 2000 Asian Championships. He also competed at the 1996 Olympic Games without reaching the final.

== International competitions ==
Year	Competition	Venue	Position	Event	Notes
Representing Kyrgyzstan
1995	Universiade	Fukuoka, Japan	18th (q)	Triple jump	15.08 m
1996	Olympic Games	Atlanta, United States	37th (q)	Triple jump	15.90 m
1997	West Asian Games	Tehran, Iran	1st	Triple jump	15.90 m
1998	Asian Games	Bangkok, Thailand	–	Triple jump	NM
2000	Asian Championships	Jakarta, Indonesia	9th	Long jump	7.49 m
2000	Asian Championships	Jakarta, Indonesia	2nd	Triple jump	16.33 m
