= Takanori Sugibayashi =

Japanese triple jumper

Personal information
- Born: 14 March 1976 (age 50) Kanazawa, Japan
- Education: University of Tsukuba
- Height: 1.85 m (6 ft 1 in)
- Weight: 70 kg (154 lb)

Sport
- Country: Japan
- Sport: Track and field
- Event: Triple jump

Achievements and titles
- Personal best: 17.02 m (Sapporo 2000)
Medal record
Men's athletics
Representing Japan
Asian Championships
Silver medal – second place	1998 Fukuoka	Triple jump
East Asian Games
Silver medal – second place	2001 Osaka	Triple jump

Takanori Sugibayashi (Japanese: 杉林 孝法; born 14 March 1976) is a retired Japanese triple jumper. His personal best is 17.02 metres, achieved in July 2000 in Sapporo. He has competed at the Olympic Games twice.

== Personal best ==
Event	Performance	Competition	Venue	Date	Notes
Triple jump	17.02 m (+2.0 m/s)	Chūhei Nambu Memorial	Sapporo, Japan	16 July 2000	

== International competitions ==
Representing Japan
Year	Competition	Venue	Position	Event	Notes
1997	Universiade	Catania, Italy	22nd (q)	Long jump	7.38 m
1997	Universiade	Catania, Italy	15th (q)	Triple jump	16.00 m
1998	Asian Championships	Fukuoka], Japan	2nd	Triple jump	16.50 m
1998	Asian Games	Bangkok, Thailand	4th	Triple jump	16.39 m
1999	World Indoor Championships	Maebashi, Japan	8th	Triple jump	15.97 m
2000	Olympic Games	Sydney, Australia	16th (q)	Triple jump	16.67 m
2001	East Asian Games	Osaka, Japan	2nd	Triple jump	16.45 m
2001	World Championships	Edmonton, Canada	18th (q)	Triple jump	16.41 m
2003	World Championships	Paris, France	18th (q)	Triple jump	16.53 m
2003	Asian Championships	Fukuoka, Japan	6th	Triple jump	16.23 m
2004	Olympic Games	Athens, Greece	38th (q)	Triple jump	15.95 m
2007	World Championships	Osaka, Japan	31st (q)	Triple jump	16.21 m

== National titles ==
- Japanese Championships
  - Triple jump: 1997, 1998, 2001, 2003, 2004, 2007, 2009
