= 2011 European Athletics Indoor Championships – Men's triple jump =

The Men's triple jump event at the 2011 European Athletics Indoor Championships was held on March 4–6, 2011 with the final being held on March 6 at 16:25 local time.

== Records ==
Standing records prior to the 2011 European Athletics Indoor Championships
World record	Teddy Tamgho (FRA)	17.91	Aubière, France	20 February 2011
European record	Teddy Tamgho (FRA)	17.91	Aubière, France	20 February 2011
Championship record	Fabrizio Donato (ITA)	17.59	Turin, Italy	7 March 2009
World Leading	Teddy Tamgho (FRA)	17.91	Aubière, France	20 February 2011
European Leading	Teddy Tamgho (FRA)	17.91	Aubière, France	20 February 2011

== Results ==
=== Qualification ===
Qualification: Qualification Performance 16.95 (Q) or at least 8 best performers advanced to the final. It was held at 17:20.

Rank	Athlete	Nationality	#1	#2	#3	Result	Note
1	Teddy Tamgho	France	17.06			17.06	Q
2	Yoann Rapinier	France	X	17.04		17.04	Q, PB
3	Marian Oprea	Romania	17.00			17.00	Q
4	Fabrizio Donato	Italy	15.96	16.99		16.99	Q
5	Christian Olsson	Sweden	16.79	X	16.87	16.87	q
6	Dzmitry Dziatsuk	Belarus	16.77	16.87	16.11	16.87	q
7	Daniele Greco	Italy	16.19	X	16.75	16.75	q, SB
8	Anders Møller	Denmark	15.74	16.67	16.60	16.67	q
9	Karl Taillepierre	France	16.49	16.00	16.62	16.62	
10	Fabrizio Schembri	Italy	X	16.47	16.59	16.59	
11	Jaroslav Dobrovodský	Slovakia	X	16.20	16.55	16.55	PB
12	Yochai Halevi	Israel	16.34	16.30	15.96	16.34	
13	Vladimir Letnicov	Moldova	15.81	16.32	X	16.32	
14	Dimítrios Tsiámis	Greece	16.30	16.13	15.71	16.30	
15	Momchil Karailiev	Bulgaria	X	16.29	X	16.29	
16	Vicente Docavo	Spain	16.28	15.79	16.13	16.28	
17	Siarhei Ivanou	Belarus	15.78	16.06	16.24	16.24	
18	Elvijs Misans	Latvia	X	16.07	16.10	16.10	
19	Jaanus Uudmäe	Estonia	15.54	X	16.07	16.07	
20	Peder P. Nielsen	Denmark	15.97	X	X	15.97	
21	Zacharias Arnos	Cyprus	X	15.76	15.77	15.77	
22	Alin Anghel	Romania	15.66	X	X	15.66	
23	Kristinn Torfason	Iceland	X	14.80	X	14.80	

=== Final ===
The final was held at 16:25.

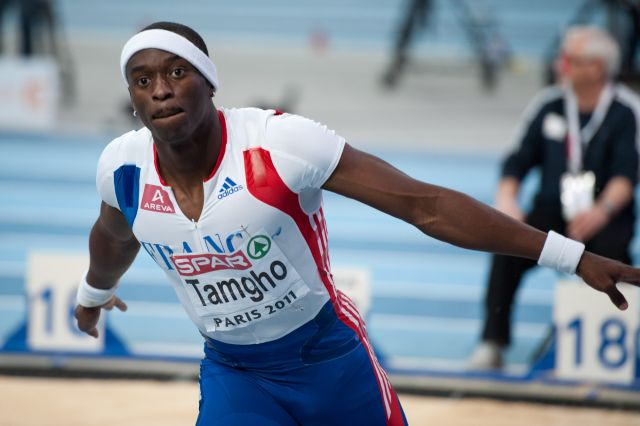
Teddy Tamgho of France set the new indoor world record.

Rank	Athlete	Nationality	#1	#2	#3	#4	#5	#6	Result	Note
1st place, gold medalist(s)	Teddy Tamgho	France	17.46	17.92	17.65	17.92	X	X	17.92	WR
2nd place, silver medalist(s)	Fabrizio Donato	Italy	X	17.70	15.50	17.73	17.49	X	17.73	NR
3rd place, bronze medalist(s)	Marian Oprea	Romania	17.62	17.43	X	X	-	15.41	17.62	SB
4	Yoann Rapinier	France	17.15	17.23	X	-	X	16.76	17.23	PB
5	Christian Olsson	Sweden	17.20	X	X	X	16.65	X	17.20	=SB
6	Anders Møller	Denmark	X	16.38	16.31	16.41	X	16.72	16.72	SB
7	Dzmitry Dziatsuk	Belarus	16.04	16.02	15.80	15.75	16.27	16.26	16.27	
8	Daniele Greco	Italy	16.04	16.24	X	X	16.02	X	16.24	
