= Chao Chih-kuo =

Taiwanese long jumper

Personal information
- Born: 9 December 1972 (age 53)

Chinese name
- Traditional Chinese: 趙志國
- Hanyu Pinyin: Zhào Zhìguó

Sport
- Sport: Long jump
Medal record
Men's athletics
Representing Chinese Taipei
Asian Championships
Silver medal – second place	1993 Manila	Long jump
Silver medal – second place	1995 Jakarta	Long jump

Chao Chih-Kuo (born 9 December 1972) is a retired Taiwanese long jumper.

He won the silver medals at both the 1993 and 1995 Asian Championships, and finished eleventh at the 1995 Summer Universiade. He also competed at the 1995 World Indoor Championships, the 1995 World Championships, the 1996 Olympic Games and the 1998 Asian Games without reaching the final.

His personal best jump was 8.16 metres, achieved on 6 May 1995 at the 39th Penghu County Athletics Championships.
