= 1992 World Junior Championships in Athletics – Men's long jump =

The men's long jump event at the 1992 World Junior Championships in Athletics was held in Seoul, South Korea, at Olympic Stadium on 16 and 17 September.

== Medalists ==
| Gold | Neil Chance; United States |
| Silver | Robert Thomas; United States |
| Bronze | Ivaylo Mladenov; Bulgaria |

== Results ==
=== Final ===
17 September

| Rank | Name | Nationality | Attempts | | | | | | Result | Notes |
| Rank | Name | Nationality | 1 | 2 | 3 | 4 | 5 | 6 | Result | Notes |
|---|---|---|---|---|---|---|---|---|---|---|
| 1st place, gold medalist(s) | Neil Chance | United States | 7.56 (w: -1.1 m/s) | 7.15 (w: +0.1 m/s) | 7.77 (w: -0.5 m/s) | x | 7.89 (w: +0.2 m/s) | x | 7.89 (w: +0.2 m/s) | |
| 2nd place, silver medalist(s) | Robert Thomas | United States | x | 7.54 (w: +0.7 m/s) | 7.80 (w: +0.3 m/s) | x | 7.84 (w: +0.4 m/s) | x | 7.84 (w: +0.4 m/s) | |
| 3rd place, bronze medalist(s) | Ivaylo Mladenov | Bulgaria | 7.68 (w: -0.2 m/s) | x | x | 7.65 (w: 0.0 m/s) | x | 7.61 (w: +0.4 m/s) | 7.68 (w: -0.2 m/s) | |
| 4 | György Makó | Hungary | 7.40 (w: -1.0 m/s) | 7.62 (w: +0.5 m/s) | 7.57 (w: +0.7 m/s) | 7.68 (w: -0.6 m/s) | x | 7.53 (w: -1.9 m/s) | 7.68 (w: -0.6 m/s) | |
| 5 | Yevgeniy Pechonkin | Commonwealth of Independent States | 7.50 (w: -0.8 m/s) | 7.36 (w: 0.0 m/s) | x | x | 7.58 (w: +1.0 m/s) | x | 7.58 (w: +1.0 m/s) | |
| 6 | Juan Carlos Garzon | Cuba | x | 7.52 (w: +0.1 m/s) | x | x | 7.44 (w: -0.6 m/s) | x | 7.52 (w: +0.1 m/s) | |
| 7 | Yassin Guellet | Belgium | x | x | 7.49 (w: -0.2 m/s) | x | x | x | 7.49 (w: -0.2 m/s) | |
| 8 | Ryan Moore | Australia | 7.36 (w: +1.3 m/s) | 7.43 (w: -0.8 m/s) | 5.24 (w: 0.0 m/s) | 7.29 (w: -1.8 m/s) | x | x | 7.43 (w: -0.8 m/s) | |
| 9 | Nélson Ferreira | Brazil | 7.41 (w: +1.1 m/s) | 7.20 (w: -1.2 m/s) | 7.24 (w: +0.4 m/s) | | | | 7.41 (w: +1.1 m/s) | |
| 10 | Erik Nys | Belgium | 7.36 (w: +0.2 m/s) | 7.30 (w: +0.2 m/s) | 7.25 (w: +0.4 m/s) | | | | 7.36 (w: +0.2 m/s) | |
| 11 | Tadakazu Ohashi | Japan | 7.05 (w: -0.1 m/s) | 6.98 (w: -0.2 m/s) | 7.03 (w: +0.2 m/s) | | | | 7.05 (w: -0.1 m/s) | |
| | Mickael Pauloby | France | x | x | x | | | | NM | |

=== Qualifications ===
16 Sep

==== Group A ====
| Rank | Name | Nationality | Attempts | | | Result | Notes |
| Rank | Name | Nationality | 1 | 2 | 3 | Result | Notes |
|---|---|---|---|---|---|---|---|
| 1 | György Makó | Hungary | 7.44 (w: +0.2 m/s) | 7.54 (w: 0.0 m/s) | 7.75 (w: -0.8 m/s) | 7.75 (w: -0.8 m/s) | Q |
| 2 | Nélson Ferreira | Brazil | 7.48 (w: +0.2 m/s) | 5.40 (w: +0.7 m/s) | 7.51 (w: +0.3 m/s) | 7.51 (w: +0.3 m/s) | q |
| 3 | Tadakazu Ohashi | Japan | x | 7.24 (w: +0.9 m/s) | 7.49 (w: -0.9 m/s) | 7.49 (w: -0.9 m/s) | q |
| 4 | Erik Nys | Belgium | 7.36 (w: -0.5 m/s) | 7.48 (w: 0.0 m/s) | 7.42 (w: 0.0 m/s) | 7.48 (w: 0.0 m/s) | q |
| 5 | Neil Chance | United States | 7.34 (w: +0.8 m/s) | x | 7.45 (w: +0.2 m/s) | 7.45 (w: +0.2 m/s) | q |
| 6 | Simone Bianchi | Italy | 7.34 (w: -1.8 m/s) | x | 7.32 (w: -0.5 m/s) | 7.34 (w: -1.8 m/s) | |
| 7 | Carl Howard | United Kingdom | x | 7.24 (w: -1.1 m/s) | 7.31 (w: -0.3 m/s) | 7.31 (w: -0.3 m/s) | |
| 8 | Vladimir Malyavin | Commonwealth of Independent States | 7.00 (w: +1.0 m/s) | 7.25 (w: +0.3 m/s) | 7.30 (w: -0.6 m/s) | 7.30 (w: -0.6 m/s) | |
| 9 | Leon Gordon | Jamaica | x | 7.30 (w: +0.9 m/s) | 6.99 (w: -0.4 m/s) | 7.30 (w: +0.9 m/s) | |
| 10 | Michael Hessek | Germany | 7.28 (w: +0.7 m/s) | 7.22 (w: -1.0 m/s) | 7.24 (w: -0.6 m/s) | 7.28 (w: +0.7 m/s) | |
| 11 | Catalin Buricel | Romania | 7.06 (w: -0.4 m/s) | 7.17 (w: -1.1 m/s) | 7.11 (w: -0.4 m/s) | 7.17 (w: -1.1 m/s) | |
| 12 | Domingo Díaz | Spain | 7.13 (w: -0.3 m/s) | x | x | 7.13 (w: -0.3 m/s) | |
| 13 | Choo Juing-Dae | South Korea | 7.02 (w: +1.1 m/s) | x | x | 7.02 (w: +1.1 m/s) | |
| 14 | Niels Kruller | Netherlands | 6.84 (w: +0.1 m/s) | 6.87 (w: +0.7 m/s) | 6.93 (w: 0.0 m/s) | 6.93 (w: 0.0 m/s) | |

==== Group B ====
| Rank | Name | Nationality | Attempts | | | Result | Notes |
| Rank | Name | Nationality | 1 | 2 | 3 | Result | Notes |
|---|---|---|---|---|---|---|---|
| 1 | Robert Thomas | United States | 7.98 (w: +0.9 m/s) | - | - | 7.98 (w: +0.9 m/s) | Q |
| 2 | Yevgeniy Pechonkin | Commonwealth of Independent States | 7.49 (w: -0.3 m/s) | 7.48 (w: +1.1 m/s) | 7.75 (w: +0.1 m/s) | 7.75 (w: +0.1 m/s) | Q |
| 3 | Mickael Pauloby | France | x | 7.74 (w: 0.0 m/s) | - | 7.74 (w: 0.0 m/s) | Q |
| 4 | Ryan Moore | Australia | 7.65 (w: -0.6 m/s) | - | - | 7.65 (w: -0.6 m/s) | Q |
| 5 | Ivaylo Mladenov | Bulgaria | 7.46 (w: +0.6 m/s) | 7.49 (w: +0.7 m/s) | 7.31 (w: +0.4 m/s) | 7.49 (w: +0.7 m/s) | q |
| 6 | Yassin Guellet | Belgium | 7.47 (w: +0.9 m/s) | x | x | 7.47 (w: +0.9 m/s) | q |
| 7 | Juan Carlos Garzon | Cuba | x | x | 7.43 (w: +0.1 m/s) | 7.43 (w: +0.1 m/s) | q |
| 8 | Bogdan Țăruș | Romania | 7.39 (w: 0.0 m/s) | 7.41 (w: +0.6 m/s) | x | 7.41 (w: +0.6 m/s) | |
| 9 | Seong Hui-Jun | South Korea | 7.40 (w: 0.0 m/s) | x | x | 7.40 (w: 0.0 m/s) | |
| 10 | Márcio da Cruz | Brazil | 7.37 (w: +0.7 m/s) | 7.37 (w: -0.1 m/s) | x | 7.37 (w: +0.7 m/s) | |
| 11 | Gregor Cankar | Slovenia | 7.28 (w: +0.2 m/s) | - | - | 7.28 (w: +0.2 m/s) | |
| 12 | Keita Cline | British Virgin Islands | 7.13 (w: +0.7 m/s) | x | x | 7.13 (w: +0.7 m/s) | |
| 13 | Ndabazinhle Mdhlongwa | Zimbabwe | 6.83 (w: +0.3 m/s) | 7.06 (w: -0.6 m/s) | 7.03 (w: +0.7 m/s) | 7.06 (w: -0.6 m/s) | |
| 14 | Kisho Kanki | Japan | x | 6.99 (w: -0.3 m/s) | 6.86 (w: +1.2 m/s) | 6.99 (w: -0.3 m/s) | |
| 15 | Wang Dong | China | 6.64 (w: -1.2 m/s) | 3.60 (w: +1.1 m/s) | x | 6.64 (w: -1.2 m/s) | |

== Participation ==
According to an unofficial count, 29 athletes from 22 countries participated in the event.

- Australia (1)
- Belgium (2)
- Brazil (2)
- British Virgin Islands (1)
- Bulgaria (1)
- China (1)
- Commonwealth of Independent States (2)
- Cuba (1)
- France (1)
- Germany (1)
- Hungary (1)
- Italy (1)
- Jamaica (1)
- Japan (2)
- Netherlands (1)
- Romania (2)
- Slovenia (1)
- South Korea (2)
- Spain (1)
- United Kingdom (1)
- United States (2)
- Zimbabwe (1)
