= Athletics at the 2013 Summer Universiade – Men's triple jump =

The men's triple jump event at the 2013 Summer Universiade was held on 7–9 July.

== Medalists ==
Gold	Silver	Bronze
Viktor Kuznyetsov; Ukraine	Aleksey Fyodorov; Russia	Yevgeniy Ektov; Kazakhstan

== Results ==
=== Qualification ===
Qualification: 16.50 m (Q) or at least 12 best (q) qualified for the final.

Rank	Group	Athlete	Nationality	#1	#2	#3	Result	Notes
1	A	Alexey Fedorov	Russia	16.85			16.85	Q, SB
2	B	Viktor Kuznyetsov	Ukraine	16.31	x	16.24	16.31	
3	A	Marcos Caldeira	Portugal	16.15	x	15.20	16.15	q, SB
4	B	Yevgeniy Ektov	Kazakhstan	16.07	x	x	16.07	q
5	A	Aleksi Tammentie	Finland	14.62	15.93	r	15.93	q
6	A	Hugues Fabrice Zango	Burkina Faso	x	15.18	15.74	15.74	q
7	A	Alwyn Jones	Australia	15.66	15.50	15.24	15.66	q
8	A	Aşkın Karaca	Turkey	x	15.61	15.56	15.61	q
9	B	Li Pangshuai	China	14.56	15.23	15.58	15.58	q
10	A	Adrian Daianu	Romania	15.50	15.41	x	15.50	q
11	B	Mamadou Gueye	Senegal	15.12	15.43	15.14	15.43	q
12	B	Pavels Kovalovs	Latvia	x	15.39	14.32	15.39	q, SB
13	A	Hasheem Abdul-Halim	United States Virgin Islands	15.31	15.07	13.96	15.31	
14	B	Eugene Vollmer	Fiji	15.02	x	15.29	15.29	
15	B	Ruslan Samitov	Russia	x	14.82	15.11	15.11	
16	A	Michael Seyram Bruce	Ghana	x	15.02	x	15.02	
17	B	Ruri Rammokolodi	Botswana	14.79	14.74	14.74	14.79	
18	B	Kweku Ampiah Essah	Ghana	14.64	x	14.39	14.64	
19	A	Navjot Singh	India	x	14.20	14.44	14.44	
20	A	Thalosang Tshireletso	Botswana	x	14.27	—	14.27	
21	A	Sten Veelak	Estonia	13.85	x	14.20	14.20	
	B	Igor Syunin	Estonia	x	x	x	NM	
	B	Pradeep Jayalath	Sri Lanka	x	x	x	NM	
	A	Amos Komen Amos Kiprono	Kenya				DNS	
	B	Denvil Ruan	Anguilla				DNS	
	B	Jean Martin Byzances Mbana	Republic of the Congo				DNS	

=== Final ===
Rank	Athlete	Nationality	#1	#2	#3	#4	#5	#6	Result	Notes
1st place, gold medalist(s)	Viktor Kuznyetsov	Ukraine	16.80	16.49	16.51	x	17.01	16.54	17.01	SB
2nd place, silver medalist(s)	Alexey Fedorov	Russia	16.89w	16.88	15.81	16.81	16.46	16.65	16.89w	*SB
3rd place, bronze medalist(s)	Yevgeniy Ektov	Kazakhstan	16.57	x	16.36	x	x	16.49	16.57	
4	Aleksi Tammentie	Finland	15.87	16.02	x	x	16.31	15.90	16.31	SB
5	Aşkın Karaca	Turkey	x	16.27	–	x	–	x	16.27	
6	Hugues Fabrice Zango	Burkina Faso	15.63	15.96	15.64	x	x	15.74	15.96	
7	Alwyn Jones	Australia	15.73	15.93	15.86	15.75	15.93	15.86	15.93	
8	Marcos Caldeira	Portugal	15.82	x	15.70	15.87	x	x	15.87	
9	Li Pangshuai	China	15.02	15.69	15.55				15.69	
10	Mamadou Gueye	Senegal	13.87	15.24	15.53				15.53	
11	Adrian Daianu	Romania	15.02	15.47	x				15.47	
12	Pavels Kovalovs	Latvia	15.24	15.11	14.96				15.24	
