= 2002 Asian Athletics Championships – Men's triple jump =

The men's triple jump event at the 2002 Asian Athletics Championships was held in Colombo, Sri Lanka on 11 August.

== Results ==
Rank	Name	Nationality	Result	Notes
1st place, gold medalist(s)	Salem Al-Ahmedi	Saudi Arabia	16.61	
2nd place, silver medalist(s)	Kazuyoshi Ishikawa	Japan	16.42	
3rd place, bronze medalist(s)	Mohammed Hamdi Awadh	Qatar	16.18	SB
4	Amarjeet Singh	India	16.12	
5	Vasiliy Sokov	Uzbekistan	15.97	
6	Li Xing	China	15.88	
7	Nattaporn Nomkanha	Thailand	15.88	
8	Lee Kang-Min	South Korea	15.65	
9	Masashi Watanabe	Japan	15.32	
10	Sampath Weerasinghe	Sri Lanka	15.25	
11	Nishan Kumara Appuhamy	Sri Lanka	14.94	
12	Gayan Sameera	Sri Lanka	14.74	
13	Riyad Al-Shalabi	Jordan	14.79	PB
	Ibrahim Mohamed Aboubaker	Qatar	NM	
