= Viktor Kuznyetsov =

Ukrainian long and triple jumper

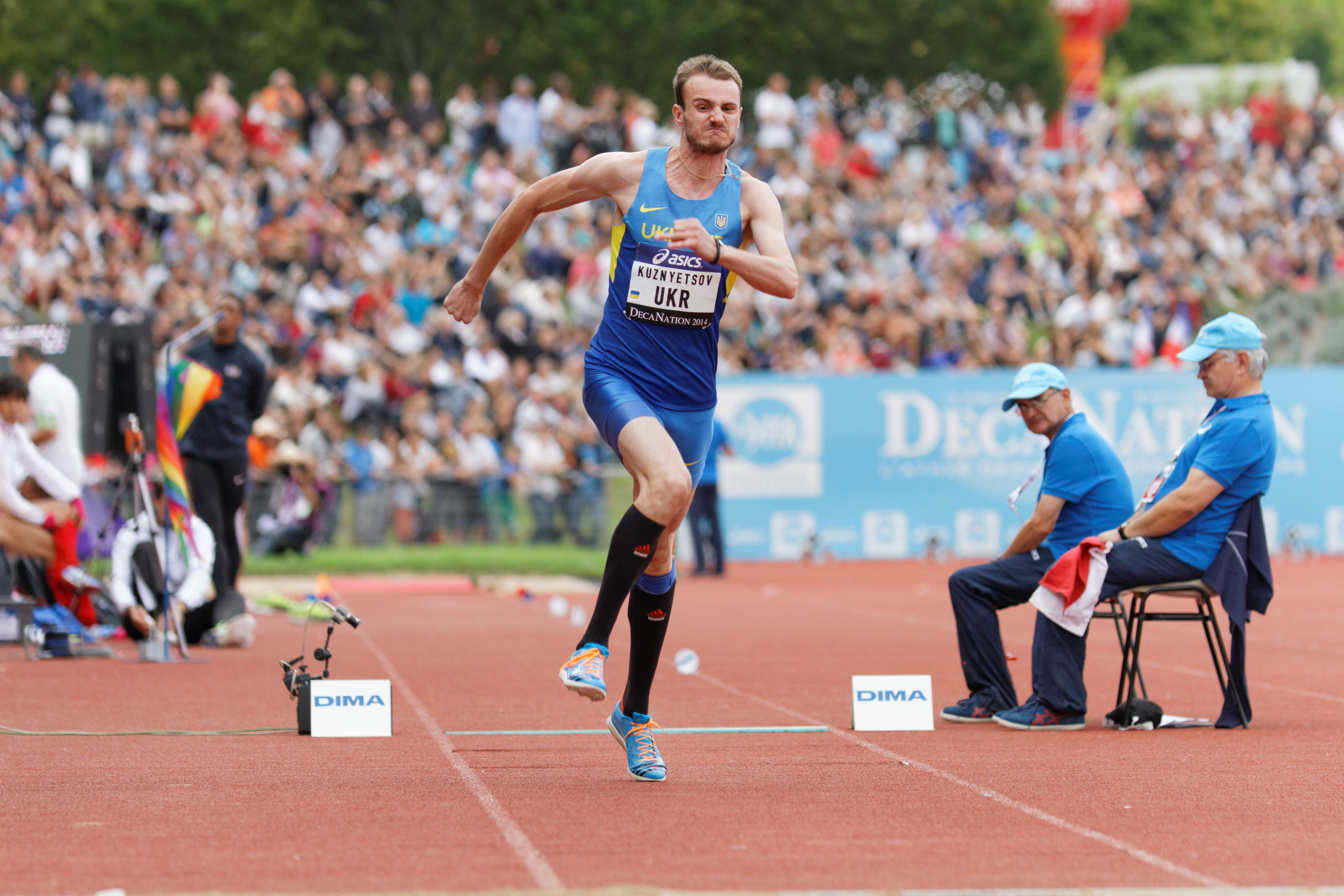
- Viktor Kuznyetsov in 2014

Personal information
- Full name: Viktor Andriyovych Kuznyetsov
- Nationality: Ukrainian
- Born: 17 July 1986 (age 39) Zaporizhia, Ukrainian SSR, Soviet Union
- Height: 1.94 m (6 ft 4 in)
- Weight: 78 kg (172 lb)

Sport
- Sport: Athletics
- Events: Triple jump, Long jump
Medal record
Men's athletics
Representing Ukraine
European Team Championships
Gold medal – first place	2010 Bergen	Triple jump
Bronze medal – third place	2011 Stockholm	Triple jump
Bronze medal – third place	2014 Braunschweig	Triple jump
Summer Universiade
Gold medal – first place	2013 Kazan	Triple jump
Silver medal – second place	2007 Bangkok	Triple jump
Silver medal – second place	2011 Shenzhen	Triple jump
World Junior Championships
Bronze medal – third place	2004 Grosseto	Triple jump

Viktor Andriyovych Kuznyetsov (Ukrainian: Віктор Андрійович Кузнєцов; born 17 July 1986 in Zaporizhia) is a Ukrainian long jumper and triple jumper.

== Career ==
As a teenager he won the bronze medal in the triple jump at the 2004 World Junior Championships in a personal best of 16.58 metres. He had 16.84 metres on the indoor track, from February 2004 in Kyiv. He also had 8.12 metres in the long jump, achieved in December 2003 in Brovary. He improved to 8.22 metres in January 2005 in Brovary.

In 2006 he finished fourth in the long jump at the 2006 European Athletics Championships in Gothenburg, with an outdoor personal best of 7.96 meters. He finished seventh in the triple jump at the 2007 European Athletics Indoor Championships with a new personal indoor best of 16.92 meters. In the summer he improved to 16.94 metres, as he won the silver medal at the 2007 Summer Universiade. In 2008 he improved further to 17.16 metres, achieved in June in Yalta. He competed in the triple jump at the 2008 Olympic Games, finishing eighth.

In 2009 he finally broke the 8-metre barrier outdoors, with an 8.09 metre jump in June in Yalta. He finished eighth in the 2009 European Team Championships Super League meet in Leiria, and competed at the 2009 World Championships without reaching the final. In the 2009–10 indoor season he again jumped better than his outdoor personal best, with 8.11 metres in February 2010 in Sumy.

In summer 2010 he won the gold medal at the 2010 European Team Championships Super League meet in Bergen with an outdoor personal best of 17.26 meters. Then he finished fourth in the triple jump at the 2010 European Athletics Championships in Barcelona, with 17.29 meters, a personal best by three centimeters.

== Achievements ==
Year	Competition	Venue	Position	Event	Notes
Representing Ukraine
2004	World Junior Championships	Grosseto, Italy	3rd	Triple jump	16.58 m (wind: 0.0 m/s)
2006	European Championships	Gothenburg, Sweden	4th	Long jump	7.96 m
2007	European Indoor Championships	Birmingham, United Kingdom	7th	Triple jump	16.92 m
2007	Universiade	Bangkok, Thailand	2nd	Triple jump	16.94 m
2008	Olympic Games	Beijing, China	8th	Triple jump	16.87 m
2009	World Championships	Berlin, Germany	17th (q)	Long jump	7.98 m
2010	World Indoor Championships	Doha, Qatar	19th (q)	Long jump	7.66 m
2010	European Championships	Barcelona, Spain	4th	Triple jump	17.29 m
2011	Universiade	Shenzhen, China	2nd	Triple jump	16.89 m
2012	Olympic Games	London, United Kingdom	31st (q)	Long jump	7.50 m
2013	European Indoor Championships	Gothenburg, Sweden	4th	Triple jump	17.02 m
2013	Universiade	Kazan, Russia	1st	Triple jump	17.01 m
2013	World Championships	Moscow, Russia	14th (q)	Triple jump	16.60 m
2014	World Indoor Championships	Sopot, Poland	8th	Triple jump	16.34 m
2014	European Championships	Zürich, Switzerland	19th (q)	Triple jump	15.94 m
