= Marcos Caldeira =

Portuguese athlete (born 1988)

Personal information
- Born: 27 February 1988 (age 38) Oeiras, Portugal
- Height: 1.81 m (5 ft 11 in)
- Weight: 68 kg (150 lb) (2012)

Sport
- Country: Portugal
- Sport: Athletics
- Event: Long jump/Triple jump
- College team: Technical University of Lisbon

Marcos Caldeira (born 27 February 1988) is a Portuguese athlete competing in the long and triple jump. He won the bronze medal in the long jump at the 2007 European Junior Championships.

== Competition record ==
Year	Competition	Venue	Position	Event	Notes
Representing Portugal
2005	World Youth Championships	Marrakesh, Morocco	13th (q)	Long jump	7.01 m
2007	European Junior Championships	Hengelo, Netherlands	3rd	Long jump	7.58 m
2009	Lusophony Games	Lisbon, Portugal	2nd	Long jump	7.83 m (w)
2009	Lusophony Games	Lisbon, Portugal	3rd	Triple jump	16.41 m (w)
2009	European U23 Championships	Kaunas, Lithuania	14th (q)	Long jump	7.63 m (wind: 1.0 m/s)
2009	European U23 Championships	Kaunas, Lithuania	12th	Triple jump	15.46 m (wind: 0.7 m/s)
2010	Ibero-American Championships	San Fernando, Spain	9th	Long jump	7.45 m
2010	Ibero-American Championships	San Fernando, Spain	5th	Triple jump	16.19 m
2011	Universiade	Shenzhen, China	–	Long jump	NM
2012	European Championships	Helsinki, Finland	15th (q)	Triple jump	15.95 m
2013	Universiade	Kazan, Russia	16th (q)	Long jump	7.41 m
2013	Universiade	Kazan, Russia	8th	Triple jump	15.87 m

== Personal bests ==
Outdoor

- Long jump – 7.58 m (+2.0) (Hengelo 2007)
- Triple jump – 16.44 m (+1.8) (Lisbon 2012)

Indoor

- Long jump – 7.81 m (Espinho 2010)
