= 2003 Asian Athletics Championships – Men's triple jump =

The men's triple jump event at the 2003 Asian Athletics Championships was held in Manila, Philippines on September 20–22.

== Medalists ==
Gold	Silver	Bronze
Kazuyoshi Ishikawa; Japan	Gu Junjie; China	Wu Ji; China

== Results ==
=== Qualification ===
Rank	Name	Nationality	Result	Notes
1	Kazuyoshi Ishikawa	Japan	16.41	q
2	Gu Junjie	China	16.23	q
3	Mohammad Hazzory	Syria	16.21	q
4	Mohammed Hamdi Awadh	Qatar	15.97	q
5	Wu Ji	China	15.96	q
6	Takanori Sugibayashi	Japan	15.65	q
7	Mohamed Imam Bakhash	Bahrain	15.61	q, PB
8	Nattaporn Nomkanha	Thailand	15.44	q
9	Oleg Sakirkin	Kazakhstan	15.33	q
10	Sampath Weerasinghe	Sri Lanka	15.26	q
11	Kittisak Sukon	Thailand	15.20	q
12	Marzouk Abdullah Al-Yoha	Kuwait	15.15	q
13	Nishan Kumara Appuhamy	Sri Lanka	15.11	
14	Ahmed Fayaz Al-Dosari	Saudi Arabia	15.05	PB
15	Nguyen Anh Dat	Vietnam	14.78	SB
16	Henry Dagmil	Philippines	14.71	PB
17	Si Kuan Wong	Macau	14.62	
18	Rolando Canta	Philippines	14.61	PB
19	Nguyen Van Mua	Vietnam	14.50	PB
20	Jhomilodin Lucman	Philippines	14.37	PB

=== Final ===
Rank	Name	Nationality	Result	Notes
1st place, gold medalist(s)	Kazuyoshi Ishikawa	Japan	16.72	
2nd place, silver medalist(s)	Gu Junjie	China	16.68	
3rd place, bronze medalist(s)	Wu Ji	China	16.67	SB
4	Mohammed Hamdi Awadh	Qatar	16.49	
5	Mohammad Hazzory	Syria	16.48	NR
6	Takanori Sugibayashi	Japan	16.23	
7	Marzouk Abdullah Al-Yoha	Kuwait	15.83	SB
8	Nattaporn Nomkanha	Thailand	15.81	
9	Oleg Sakirkin	Kazakhstan	15.62	
10	Sampath Weerasinghe	Sri Lanka	15.44	
11	Kittisak Sukon	Thailand	15.40	
12	Mohamed Imam Bakhash	Bahrain	15.08	
