= Yevgeniy Petin =

Uzbekistani triple jumper

Personal information
- Born: January 29, 1975 (age 51)

Sport
- Country: Uzbekistan
- Sport: Athletics
- Event: triple jump

Yevgeniy Vladimirovich Petin (Евгений Владимирович Петин; born 29 January 1975) is an Uzbekistani triple jumper. His personal best jump is 16.67 metres, achieved in July 2000 in Moscow.

He competed at the 1996 Olympic Games, the 1997 World Championships and the 2000 Olympic Games without reaching the final. In the qualification of the triple jump, he showed the 34th result (15.27).

In the same year, he took 10th place at the Asian Athletics Championships in Jakarta (15.53).

== International competitions ==
Year	Competition	Venue	Position	Event	Notes
Representing Uzbekistan
1996	Olympic Games	Atlanta, United States	38th (q)	Triple jump	15.89 m
1997	World Championships	Athens, Greece	32nd (q)	Triple jump	16.13 m
1998	Asian Games	Bangkok, Thailand	9th (q)	Long jump	7.35 m^{1}
1998	Asian Games	Bangkok, Thailand	5th	Triple jump	16.13 m
2000	Asian Championships	Jakarta, Indonesia	10th	Triple jump	15.53 m
2000	Olympic Games	Sydney, Australia	34th (q)	Triple jump	15.27 m

^{1}No mark in the final
