= Yevgeniy Ektov =

Kazakhstani triple jumper (born 1986)

Personal information
- Born: 10 September 1986 (age 39)
- Height: 1.87 m (6 ft 1 1/2 in)
- Weight: 75 kg (165 lb)

Sport
- Country: Kazakhstan
- Sport: Athletics
- Event: Triple jump
Medal record
Men's athletics
Representing Kazakhstan
Asian Games
Silver medal – second place	2010 Guangzhou	Triple jump
Asian Championships
Gold medal – first place	2011 Kobe	Triple jump
Bronze medal – third place	2009 Guangzhou	Triple jump
Asian Indoor Championships
Bronze medal – third place	2006 Pattaya	Triple jump
Universiade
Bronze medal – third place	2011 Shenzhen	Triple jump
Bronze medal – third place	2013 Kazan	Triple jump
- Updated on 9 July 2013

Yevgeniy Ektov (born 1 September 1986, in Petropavlovsk) is a Kazakhstani track and field athlete who competes in the triple jump. He represented his country at the 2012 Summer Olympics, and the World Championships in Athletics in 2009 and 2011. He was the triple jump gold medallist at the 2011 Asian Athletics Championships and was runner-up at the 2010 Asian Games. Ektov has also won medals at the Asian Indoor Games and Asian Indoor Athletics Championships. His personal best for the event was 17.07 metres, set in 2008, improved to 17.22, set in 2012 (Almaty, 1 July 2012). He is married to Irina Ektova.

== Career ==
Ektov began his career as a junior and won the national junior indoor triple jump title in 2004. The following year he was the runner-up at the senior indoor and outdoor championships behind Roman Valiyev. The 2005 season saw him improve his best jump to 16.31 m and he also made his first major international appearance, coming seventh at the 2005 Asian Athletics Championships. He became the Kazakhstani national champion both indoor and outdoors in 2006, but he was behind his rival Valiyev on the regional stage – at the 2006 Asian Indoor Athletics Championships Valiyev took gold while Ektov managed the bronze medal (his first podium finish at an Asia-level event).

In the 2007 indoor season he set a personal best with a jump of 16.34 m, which brought him the bronze at the 2007 Asian Indoor Games. Although he repeated as the national outdoor champion, he failed to record a mark at the Summer Universiade in Bangkok later that year. Ektov failed to make the podium at the 2008 Asian Indoor Athletics Championships (ending up fifth), but achieved a significant improvement in his best on the 2008 Asian Grand Prix tour. At the meet in Korat, he won with a mark of 17.07 m, surpassing the 17-metre barrier for the first time. This made him Asia's third best triple jumper that year (behind China's Li Yanxi and Wu Bo), but because it was just short of the Olympic "A" standard Kazakhstan could only send one athlete to the 2008 Beijing Olympics and the more experienced Valiyev got the berth.

The 2009 season marked a career progression: Ektov won the national title with a jump of 17 metres exactly and came sixth in a high quality international field at the 2009 Summer Universiade. He represented his country on the global stage for the first time at the 2009 World Championships in Athletics, although he did not progress beyond the qualifying rounds. While fellow countryman Valiyev won at both the 2009 Asian Indoor Games and the 2009 Asian Athletics Championships, Ektov also reached the podium at both events by taking the silver medal indoors and a bronze outdoors.

He won a further national title outdoors in 2010 with a wind-assisted 16.96 m and achieved his best legal jump of the season at his most important competition of the year – his clearance of 16.86 m brought him the silver at the 2010 Asian Games behind the home favourite Li Yanxi. The year after, Ektov claimed his first major triple jump title – beating both Li and Valiyev, he produced the third best jump of his career (16.91 m) to win the gold medal at the 2011 Asian Athletics Championships.

== Competition record ==
Year	Competition	Venue	Position	Event	Notes
Representing Kazakhstan
2005	Asian Championships	Incheon, South Korea	7th	Triple jump	15.67 m
2006	Asian Indoor Championships	Pattaya, Thailand	3rd	Triple jump	15.93 m
2007	Universiade	Bangkok, Thailand	–	Triple jump	NM
2007	Asian Indoor Games	Macau	3rd	Triple jump	16.34 m
2008	Asian Indoor Championships	Doha, Qatar	5th	Triple jump	15.98 m
2009	Universiade	Belgrade, Serbia	6th	Triple jump	16.73 m
2009	World Championships	Berlin, Germany	35th (q)	Triple jump	16.13 m
2009	Asian Indoor Games	Hanoi, Vietnam	2nd	Triple jump	16.44 m
2009	Asian Championships	Guangzhou, China	3rd	Triple jump	16.49 m
2010	Asian Games	Guangzhou, China	2nd	Triple jump	16.86 m
2011	Asian Championships	Kobe, Japan	1st	Triple jump	16.91 m
2011	Universiade	Shenzhen, China	3rd	Triple jump	16.83 m
2011	World Championships	Daegu, South Korea	–	Triple jump	NM
2012	Olympic Games	London, United Kingdom	19th (q)	Triple jump	16.31 m
2013	Universiade	Kazan, Russia	3rd	Triple jump	16.57 m
2014	Asian Games	Incheon, South Korea	4th	Triple jump	16.62 m
2016	Asian Indoor Championships	Doha, Qatar	4th	Triple jump	15.91 m
