= Dennis Fernández =

Cuban triple jumper

Personal information
- Born: 23 January 1986 (age 40)

Sport
- Country: Cuba
- Sport: Athletics
- Event: Triple jump

Achievements and titles
- Personal best: Triple jump: 16.92 m (2005)

Dennis Fernández (born 23 January 1986) is a Cuban male triple jumper, who won an individual gold medal at the Youth World Championships.
