= Ibrahim Mohamedin =

Qatari triple jumper

Ibrahim Mohamedin Aboubaker (born 10 December 1982) is a Qatari triple jumper.

He won the 1999 World Youth Championships, finished eighth at the 2000 World Junior Championships, sixth at the 2000 Asian Championships and sixth at the 2006 Asian Games. He also competed at the 1998 World Junior Championships and 2004 Olympic Games and the 2008 Olympic Games without reaching the final.

His personal best jump is 17.15 metres, achieved in April 2004 in Doha.

At the 2006 Asian Games he also finished tenth in the long jump. His personal best in that event was 7.53 metres, achieved in March 2006 in Abu Dhabi.
