= Dzmitry Dziatsuk =

Belarusian triple jumper

Dzmitry Dziatsuk (Belarusian: Дзьмітры Дзяцук; born 9 April 1985) is a retired Belarusian triple jumper.

== Achievements ==
Year	Competition	Venue	Position	Event	Notes
Representing Belarus
2003	European Junior Championships	Tampere, Finland	2nd	Triple jump	16.13 m
2004	World Junior Championships	Grosseto, Italy	6th	Triple jump	16.17 m (wind: +1.0 m/s)
2005	European U23 Championships	Erfurt, Germany	6th	Triple jump	16.13 m (wind: +1.9 m/s)
2007	European U23 Championships	Debrecen, Hungary	7th	Triple jump	15.86 m (wind: -0.4 m/s)
2009	European Indoor Championships	Turin, Italy	5th	Triple jump	16.88 m
2009	World Championships	Berlin, Germany	23rd (q)	Triple jump	16.58 m
2011	European Indoor Championships	Paris, France	7th	Triple jump	16.27 m
2011	Military World Games	Rio de Janeiro, Brazil	3rd	Triple jump	16.38 m
