= Jaanus Uudmäe =

Estonian athlete (born 1980)

Personal information
- Full name: Jaanus Uudmäe
- Born: 24 December 1980 (age 45) Tartu, then part of Estonian SSR, Soviet Union

Jaanus Uudmäe (born 24 December 1980) is an Estonian triple jumper and long jumper. His personal best in triple jump is 17.06m.

Competing for the Arkansas Razorbacks track and field team, Uudmäe won the 2006 triple jump at the NCAA Division I Indoor Track and Field Championships with a mark of 16.57 m. Uudmäe also competed for the Southern Illinois Salukis track and field team.

His father Jaak Uudmäe is a gold medalist in triple jump at the 1980 Summer Olympics in Moscow.

== Achievements ==
Year	Tournament	Venue	Position	Mark	Event
2009	European Indoor Championships	Torino, Italy	7th	16.73 m	Triple jump
2010	European Championships	Barcelona, Spain	15th	16.72 m	Triple jump
2011	European Indoor Championships	Paris, France	19th	16.07 m	Triple jump
