= Gary White (athlete) =

British athlete

Gary White (born 16 June 1985 in Coventry, England) is a triple jumper. He was the 2007 European under-23 champion. He is also an under-23 AAA Champion. White attended University of Wales Institute, Cardiff. He competes for Cardiff AAC, his personal best triple jump is 16.33 metres.
