= Simone Bianchi (athlete) =

Italian long jumper

Personal information
- Nationality: Italian
- Born: 27 January 1973 (age 53) Campiglia Marittima, Italy

Sport
- Country: Italy
- Sport: Athletics
- Event: Long jump
- Club: C.S. Carabinieri

Achievements and titles
- Personal best: Long jump: 8.25 m (1998)
Medal record
European Cup
Gold medal – first place	1996 Madrid	Long jump

Simone Bianchi (born 27 January 1973) is a retired Italian long jumper.

== Biography ==
He won the Europe Cup 1996 in Madrid achieving his personal best. He was 4 times Italian Champion. He finished fourth at the 1998 European Championships.

His personal best jump was 8.25 metres, achieved in June 1996 in Madrid. In Italy only Giovanni Evangelisti and Andrew Howe has jumped farther.

== Achievements ==
Year	Competition	Venue	Position	Event	Notes
Representing Italy
1992	World Junior Championships	Seoul, South Korea	16th (q)	Long jump	7.34 m (wind: -1.8 m/s)
1994	European Championships	Helsinki, Finland	13th (q)	Long jump	7.80 m (wind: +0.1 m/s)
1996	Olympic Games	Atlanta, United States	Qual.	Long jump	7.79 m
1998	European Championships	Budapest, Hungary	4th	Long jump	8.02 m

== National titles ==
Simone Bianchi has won 4 times the individual national championship.

- 3 wins in the long jump (1993, 1996, 1998)
- 1 win in the long jump indoor (1997)

== See also ==
- Italian all-time lists - Long jump
