= Mohamed Abbas Darwish =

Emirati triple jumper (born 1986)

Mohamed Abbas Darwish (born 28 March 1986) is an Emirati triple jumper.

He won the bronze medal in the triple jump at the 2003 World Youth Championships in Athletics in Sherbrooke, Quebec, Canada. He competed in the triple jump event at the 2012 Summer Olympics, finishing 13th in the qualifier and failing to advance to the finals.
