= 1995 World Championships in Athletics – Men's triple jump =

Video on YouTube Official video

These are the official results of the Men's Triple Jump event at the 1995 IAAF World Championships in Gothenburg, Sweden. There were a total number of 44 participating athletes, with two qualifying groups and the final held on Monday August 7, 1995.

Almost three weeks before this championship, Jonathan Edwards had just marginally improved upon Willie Banks' ten year old world record (17.97m), by jumping 17.98m in Salamanca. In the preliminary round he was not even the #1 qualifier, edged out by Jérôme Romain. In his first attempt in the final Edwards umped a world record of 18.16 m. In doing so he became the first athlete in to jump further than 18 metres without wind assistance. In the second round he jumped even further, setting a new world record of 18.29 m (60 ft 0 in), the first jump over 60 feet. Edwards passed on three of his four remaining attempts. The minor medals were exceptionally close, with three centimetres separating silver and fourth, and bronze decided only on countback.

It took more than 20 years for Christian Taylor to become the first man to jump beyond Edwards' first record. 30 years later, his second world record remained unmatched.

== Schedule ==
- All times are Central European Time (UTC+1)

Qualification Round
Group A	Group B
05.08.1995 – 09:50h	05.08.1995 – 09:50h
Final Round
07.08.1995 – 17:20h

== Results ==
=== Qualifying round ===
- Held on Saturday 1995-08-05
  Qualifying standard: 17.10 metres

RANK	GROUP A	DISTANCE
1.	Jonathan Edwards (GBR)	17.46 m
2.	Yoelbi Quesada (CUB)	17.26 m
3.	Māris Bružiks (LAT)	16.95 m
4.	Rogel Nachum (ISR)	16.71 m
5.	Armen Martirosyan (ARM)	16.60 m
6.	Ndabazinhle Mdhlongwa (ZIM)	16.53 m
7.	Georges Sainte-Rose (FRA)	16.52 m
8.	Audrius Raizgys (LTU)	16.40 m
9.	Andrew Murphy (AUS)	16.37 m
10.	Denis Kapustin (RUS)	16.32 m
11.	Mohamed Karim Sassi (TUN)	16.26 m
12.	Arne Holm (SWE)	15.94 m
13.	Aleksey Fatyanov (AZE)	15.77 m
14.	Paul Nioze (SEY)	15.71 m
15.	Festus Igbinoghene (NGR)	15.68 m
16.	Edward Manderson (CAY)	15.50 m
17.	Xavier Montané (AND)	15.04 m
18.	Leonard Cobb (USA)	14.90 m
—	Oleg Sakirkin (KAZ)	NM
—	Jacek Butkiewicz (POL)	NM
—	Anísio Silva (BRA)	NM
—	Salem Mouled Al-Ahmadi (KSA)	NM

RANK	GROUP B	DISTANCE
1.	Jérôme Romain (DMA)	17.48 m
2.	Brian Wellman (BER)	17.44 m
3.	Sergey Arzamasov (KAZ)	17.27 m
4.	Yoel García (CUB)	16.98 m
5.	Tord Henriksson (SWE)	16.94 m
6.	James Beckford (JAM)	16.92 m
7.	Mike Conley (USA)	16.80 m
8.	Galin Georgiev (BUL)	16.80 m
9.	Francis Agyepong (GBR)	16.58 m
10.	Jacob Katonon (KEN)	16.55 m
11.	LaMark Carter (USA)	16.51 m
12.	Lars Hedman (SWE)	16.43 m
13.	Frank Rutherford (BAH)	16.38 m
14.	Serge Helan (FRA)	15.91 m
15.	Julio López (ESP)	15.80 m
16.	Daniel Flores (HON)	14.92 m
—	Kawan Lovelace (BIZ)	NM
—	Vasif Asadov (AZE)	NM
—	Zsolt Czingler (HUN)	NM
—	Marios Hadjiandreou (CYP)	NM
—	Zeng Lizhi (CHN)	NM
—	Francis Dodoo (GHA)	DNS

=== Final ===
Rank	Athlete	Nationality	#1	#2	#3	#4	#5	#6	Result	Notes
1st place, gold medalist(s)	Jonathan Edwards	Great Britain	18.16	18.29	–	–	17.49	–	18.29	WR
2nd place, silver medalist(s)	Brian Wellman	Bermuda	x	x	17.31	17.62w	x	x	17.62w	
3rd place, bronze medalist(s)	Jérôme Romain	Dominica	17.36	17.59w	17.25	17.18	x	x	17.59w	
4	Yoelbi Quesada	Cuba	17.19	x	x	x	x	17.59w	17.59w	
5	Yoel García	Cuba	16.90	17.16	x	x	–	x	17.16	
6	James Beckford	Jamaica	x	17.13w	x	–	–	–	17.13w	
7	Mike Conley	United States	x	16.96w	16.77	–	x	x	16.96w	
8	Galin Georgiev	Bulgaria	16.93	x	x	16.79	x	x	16.93	
9	Tord Henriksson	Sweden	16.88	16.92	16.87				16.92	
10	Māris Bružiks	Latvia	x	16.18	16.80				16.80	
11	Rogel Nachum	Israel	16.34	16.69	x				16.69	
12	Sergey Arzamasov	Kazakhstan	16.59	16.68	x				16.68	

== See also ==
- 1993 Men's World Championships Triple Jump
- 1996 Men's Olympic Triple Jump
- 1997 Men's World Championships Triple Jump
