= Athletics at the 1995 Summer Universiade – Men's triple jump =

The men's triple jump event at the 1995 Summer Universiade was held on 29–30 August at the Hakatanomori Athletic Stadium in Fukuoka, Japan.

== Medalists ==
Gold	Silver	Bronze
Andrey Kurennoy; Russia	Armen Martirosyan; Armenia	LaMark Carter; United States

== Results ==
=== Qualification ===
Qualification: 16.00 m (Q) or at least 12 best (q) qualified for the final.

Rank	Group	Athlete	Nationality	#1	#2	#3	Result	Notes
1	B	Armen Martirosyan	Armenia	16.88			16.88	Q
2	A	Andrey Kurennoy	Russia	16.79			16.79	Q
3	B	LaMark Carter	United States	16.58			16.58	Q
4	A	Akira Anzai	Japan	16.50			16.50	Q
5	B	Julio López	Spain	x	16.43		16.43	Q
6	B	Igor Sautkin	Russia	x	16.32		16.32	Q
7	B	Tosi Fasinro	Great Britain	x	15.88	16.31	16.31	Q
8	B	Masayuki Sakaino	Japan	15.52	x	16.24	16.24	Q
9	B	Sergey Arzamasov	Kazakhstan	16.20			16.20	Q
10	A	Aleksey Fatyanov	Azerbaijan	x	16.19		16.19	Q
11	B	Zoran Đurđević	Yugoslavia	16.10			16.10	Q
12	A	Julian Golley	Great Britain	15.18	x	16.06	16.06	Q
13	B	Meiram Beispekov	Kazakhstan	15.45	15.65	15.94w	15.94w	
14	A	Ivory Angello	United States	x	x	15.89	15.89	
15	B	Osman Cline-Thomas	Sierra Leone	15.03	15.15	15.81	15.81	NR
16	A	Richard Duncan	Canada	x	x	15.70	15.70	
17	A	Pierre Andersson	Sweden	15.59	15.69	x	15.69	
18	A	Maxim Smetanin	Kyrgyzstan	15.08	14.27	14.13	15.08	
19	B	Ulrich Ockhuizen	Namibia	x	14.93	x	14.93	
20	A	Steve Vinda	Seychelles	14.74	13.91	13.78	14.74	
	A	Iain Rattray	New Zealand	x	x	x	NM	
	A	János Uzsoki	Hungary	x	x	x	NM	
	B	Wong Chi Fai	Macau	x	x	–	NM	
	B	Gogo Peters	Nigeria				DNS	

=== Final ===
Rank	Athlete	Nationality	#1	#2	#3	#4	#5	#6	Result	Notes
1st place, gold medalist(s)	Andrey Kurennoy	Russia	16.77	17.21	x	17.30	17.23	16.05	17.30	
2nd place, silver medalist(s)	Armen Martirosyan	Armenia	16.80	14.67	16.80	16.82	x	16.52	16.82	
3rd place, bronze medalist(s)	LaMark Carter	United States	15.93	16.56	16.62	16.40	15.95	x	16.62	
4	Zoran Đurđević	Yugoslavia	16.56	16.16	x	16.30	15.63	16.54	16.56	
5	Tosi Fasinro	Great Britain	16.52	16.16	–	x	16.16	16.56	16.56	
6	Igor Sautkin	Russia	x	x	16.56	x	15.74	16.23	16.56	
7	Sergey Arzamasov	Kazakhstan	16.53	–	–	–	–	–	16.53	
8	Aleksey Fatyanov	Azerbaijan	16.36	15.74	16.46	16.10	16.22	16.48	16.48	
9	Julio López	Spain	15.89	x	16.33				16.33	
10	Akira Anzai	Japan	x	16.30w	16.26				16.30w	
11	Julian Golley	Great Britain	15.75	15.89w	x				15.89w	
12	Masayuki Sakaino	Japan	15.88	15.76w	15.42				15.88	
