= 1995 IAAF World Indoor Championships – Men's triple jump =

The men's triple jump event at the 1995 IAAF World Indoor Championships was held on 11–12 March.

== Medalists ==
Gold	Silver	Bronze
Brian Wellman; Bermuda	Yoelvis Quesada; Cuba	Serge Hélan; France

== Results ==
=== Qualification ===
Qualification: 16.70 (Q) or at least 12 best performers (q) qualified for the final.

Rank	Group	Name	Nationality	#1	#2	#3	Result	Notes
1	B	Brian Wellman	Bermuda	17.51			17.51	Q
2	B	Yoelvis Quesada	Cuba	17.33			17.33	Q
3	A	LaMark Carter	United States	16.20	16.92		16.92	Q
4	B	Arne Holm	Sweden	16.84			16.84	Q
5	B	Edrick Floréal	Canada	16.74			16.74	Q
6	A	Lars Hedman	Sweden	16.66	16.73		16.73	Q
7	B	Dmitriy Byzov	Russia	x	x	16.59	16.59	q
8	B	Armen Martirosyan	Armenia	16.55	16.30	16.30	16.55	q
9	B	Serge Hélan	France	16.29	16.53	16.52	16.53	q
10	A	Stoyko Tsonov	Bulgaria	16.53	–	–	16.53	q
11	A	Garfield Anselm	France	16.49	16.45	16.40	16.49	q
12	A	Francis Agyepong	Great Britain	16.49	x	x	16.49	q
13	B	Oleg Sakirkin	Kazakhstan	16.18	x	16.47	16.47	
14	A	Tyrone Scott	United States	16.34	16.43	16.42	16.43	
15	B	Audrius Raizgys	Lithuania	15.91	16.41	16.37	16.41	
16	A	Aleksey Fatyanov	Azerbaijan	16.29	x	16.19	16.29	
17	A	Vasif Asadov	Azerbaijan	16.22	16.11	15.78	16.22	
18	A	Viktor Popko	Ukraine	15.77	16.00	16.19	16.19	
18	B	Anísio Silva	Brazil	x	14.36	16.19	16.19	
19	B	Sergey Arzamasov	Kazakhstan	x	15.95	x	15.95	
20	B	Parkev Grigoryan	Armenia	15.84	15.16	15.93	15.93	
21	A	Paul Nioze	Seychelles	15.70	15.78	–	15.78	
22	A	Julio López	Spain	15.28	x	x	15.28	
	A	Freddy Nieves	Ecuador				DNS	

=== Final ===
Rank	Name	Nationality	#1	#2	#3	#4	#5	#6	Results	Notes
1st place, gold medalist(s)	Brian Wellman	Bermuda	x	17.72	x	x	–	x	17.72	CR
2nd place, silver medalist(s)	Yoelvis Quesada	Cuba	17.11	17.52	17.62	x	–	17.36	17.62	
3rd place, bronze medalist(s)	Serge Hélan	France	15.63	16.41	16.63	x	14.07	17.06	17.06	
4	Lars Hedman	Sweden	16.86	16.80	x	16.76	x	15.51	16.86	
5	Arne Holm	Sweden	14.83	16.81	x	x	15.98	16.35	16.81	
6	LaMark Carter	United States	16.73	16.02	16.49	16.67	16.67	16.80	16.80	
7	Francis Agyepong	Great Britain	x	16.17	16.74	x	x	14.44	16.74	
8	Garfield Anselm	France	16.02	x	16.37	16.51	x	16.41	16.51	
9	Armen Martirosyan	Armenia	16.37	16.35	x				16.37	
10	Dmitriy Byzov	Russia	15.90	x	16.23				16.23	
	Edrick Floréal	Canada	x	–	–				NM	
	Stoyko Tsonov	Bulgaria							DNS	
