= Athletics at the 1994 Commonwealth Games – Men's triple jump =

Men's triple jump at the Commonwealth Games

The men's triple jump event at the 1994 Commonwealth Games was held on 27 and 28 August at the Centennial Stadium in Victoria, British Columbia.

== Medalists ==
Gold	Silver	Bronze
Julian Golley; England	Jonathan Edwards; England	Brian Wellman; Bermuda

== Results ==
=== Qualification ===
Qualification: Qualifying Performance 16.80 (Q) or 12 best performers (q) advance to the Final.

Rank	Group	Name	Nationality	#1	#2	#3	Result	Notes
1	B	Jérôme Romain	Dominica	17.05			17.05	Q
2	A	Brian Wellman	Bermuda				16.86	Q
2	B	Julian Golley	England	16.86			16.86	Q
4	B	Ndabazinhle Mdhlongwa	Zimbabwe				16.69	q
5	A	Edrick Floreal	Canada				16.59	q
6	B	Jacob Katonon	Kenya				16.55	q
7	B	Jonathan Edwards	England	16.02	16.52		16.52	q
8	B	Vissen Mooneegan	Mauritius				16.35	q
9	A	Francis Agyepong	England	x	16.30		16.30	q
10	A	Andrew Murphy	Australia				16.29	q
11	A	James Sabulei	Kenya				16.27	q
12	A	Wikus Olivier	South Africa				16.25	q
13	B	Francis Dodoo	Ghana				16.22	
14	A	John MacKenzie	Scotland				16.12	
15	B	Marios Hadjiandreou	Cyprus				15.89	
16	A	Michael McDonald	Northern Ireland				15.75	
17	B	Richard Duncan	Canada				15.65	
18	B	Keita Cline	British Virgin Islands				15.49	
19	A	Lloyd Phipps-Browne	Saint Kitts and Nevis				14.74	
20	A	Elston Shaw	Belize				14.62	
21	B	Linford Castillo	Belize				14.50	
22	A	Leopold Lamb	Belize				14.08	
	A	George Wright	Canada				NM	
	B	Mohammed Zaki Sadri	Malaysia				DNS	

=== Final ===
Rank	Name	Nationality	#1	#2	#3	#4	#5	#6	Result	Notes
1st place, gold medalist(s)	Julian Golley	England	17.03	16.88	16.85				17.03	GR, PB
2nd place, silver medalist(s)	Jonathan Edwards	England	16.00	x	16.74		17.00		17.00	
3rd place, bronze medalist(s)	Brian Wellman	Bermuda	17.00	16.58	x	x	x	16.98	17.00	
4	Jérôme Romain	Dominica							16.61	
5	Edrick Floreal	Canada							16.61	
6	Francis Agyepong	England	x	16.27	16.07				16.33	
7	Ndabazinhle Mdhlongwa	Zimbabwe							16.02	
8	James Sabulei	Kenya							15.99	
9	Jacob Katonon	Kenya							15.96	
10	Andrew Murphy	Australia							15.83	
11	Wikus Olivier	South Africa							15.73	
12	Vissen Mooneegan	Mauritius							15.46	
