= 1993 IAAF World Indoor Championships – Men's triple jump =

The men's triple jump event at the 1993 IAAF World Indoor Championships was held on 12 and 13 March.

== Medalists ==
Gold	Silver	Bronze
Pierre Camara; France	Māris Bružiks; Latvia	Brian Wellman; Bermuda

Note: Nikolay Raev of Bulgaria had originally won the bronze but was later disqualified for doping.

== Results ==
=== Qualification ===
Qualification: 16.70 (Q) or at least 12 best performers (q) qualified for the final.

Rank	Group	Name	Nationality	#1	#2	#3	Result	Notes
1	A	Brian Wellman	Bermuda	17.06			17.06	Q, NR
2	A	Vladimir Melikhov	Russia	13.97	17.00		17.00	Q
3	A	Yoelvis Quesada	Cuba	16.42	16.91		16.91	Q
4	B	Māris Bružiks	Latvia	x	16.90		16.90	Q
5	B	Zou Sixin	China	15.88	x	16.67	16.67	q
6	B	Parkev Grigoryan	Armenia	16.34	16.58	–	16.58	q, NR
7	B	Jonathan Edwards	Great Britain	x	16.58	14.99	16.58	q
8	B	Pierre Camara	France	16.56	–	–	16.56	q
~~9~~	B	Nikolay Raev	Bulgaria	~~16.24~~	~~15.66~~	~~16.55~~	~~16.55~~	DQ
9	B	Toussaint Rabenala	Madagascar	x	16.47	16.25	16.47	q
10	A	Gary Johnson	United States	x	16.15	16.44	16.44	q
11	A	Tyrone Scott	United States	x	x	16.34	16.34	q
12	B	Audrius Raizgys	Lithuania	15.17	15.87	16.33	16.33	
13	A	Julian Golley	Great Britain	15.81	16.25	16.30	16.30	
14	A	Serge Hélan	France	15.59	16.13	16.25	16.25	
15	B	Daniel Osorio	Cuba	15.13	16.13	16.00	16.13	
16	A	Rogel Nachum	Israel	16.00	16.11	x	16.11	
17	B	Vasiliy Sokov	Russia	x	15.51	x	15.51	
18	A	Zeng Lizhi	China	14.65	–	–	14.65	
	A	Sergey Bykov	Ukraine	x	x	x	NM	
	B	Armen Martirosyan	Armenia				DNS	

=== Final ===
Rank	Name	Nationality	#1	#2	#3	#4	#5	#6	Result	Notes
1st place, gold medalist(s)	Pierre Camara	France	16.75	16.85	14.38	17.08	x	17.59	17.59	NR
2nd place, silver medalist(s)	Māris Bružiks	Latvia	16.81	17.24	x	17.17	17.36	x	17.36	
3rd place, bronze medalist(s)	Brian Wellman	Bermuda	16.55	x	17.27	x	16.87	x	17.27	NR
4	Vladimir Melikhov	Russia	16.62	x	17.07	17.00	16.32	x	17.07	
5	Yoelvis Quesada	Cuba	16.55	16.56	16.73	x	16.57	17.06	17.06	
6	Jonathan Edwards	Great Britain	14.49	16.76	13.64	15.14	16.74	15.53	16.76	
7	Toussaint Rabenala	Madagascar	16.60	16.53	16.74	x	16.24	16.68	16.74	NR
8	Parkev Grigoryan	Armenia	15.60	16.20	16.10				16.20	
9	Gary Johnson	United States	16.08	14.81	x				16.08	
10	Tyrone Scott	United States	15.54	x	16.02				16.02	
~~3~~	Nikolay Raev	Bulgaria	~~16.68~~	~~x~~	~~16.48~~	~~17.22~~	~~17.27~~	~~x~~	~~17.27~~	DQ
	Zou Sixin	China							DNS	
