= Athletics at the 1990 Commonwealth Games – Men's triple jump =

Men's triple jump at the Commonwealth Games

The men's triple jump event at the 1990 Commonwealth Games was held on 2 and 3 February at the Mount Smart Stadium in Auckland.

== Medalists ==
Gold	Silver	Bronze
Marios Hadjiandreou; Cyprus	Jonathan Edwards; England	Edrick Floreal; Canada

== Results ==
=== Qualification ===
Qualification: 16.65 m (Q) or at least 12 best (q) qualified for the final.

Rank	Athlete	Nationality	Result	Notes
1	John Herbert	England	16.86	Q
2	Marios Hadjiandreou	Cyprus	16.63	q
3	Paul Nioze	Seychelles	16.58	q
4	Edrick Floreal	Canada	16.57	q
5	Jonathan Edwards	England	16.50	q
6	George Wright	Canada	16.44	q
7	Vernon Samuels	England	16.38	q
8	Brian Wellman	Bermuda	16.23	q
9	Mohammed Zaki Sadri	Malaysia	16.09	q
10	Andrew Murphy	Australia	16.04	q
11	Festus Igbinoghene	Nigeria	16.00	q
12	Matt Sweeney	Australia	15.97	q
13	Craig Duncan	Scotland	15.81	
14	Ayo Aladefa	Nigeria	15.33	
	Paul Simonsen	Australia	NM	
	Oral Ogilvie	Canada	NM	
	Ikani Taliai	Tonga	DNS	

=== Final ===
Rank	Name	Nationality	#1	#2	#3	#4	#5	#6	Result	Notes
1st place, gold medalist(s)	Marios Hadjiandreou	Cyprus	16.77	16.73	16.56	16.24	16.95	?	16.95	GR
2nd place, silver medalist(s)	Jonathan Edwards	England	x	16.54	x	16.93w	x	?	16.93w	
3rd place, bronze medalist(s)	Edrick Floreal	Canada	15.81	16.89	–	x	x	?	16.89	
4	John Herbert	England	x	16.65	16.65	16.33	x	x	16.65	
5	Festus Igbinoghene	Nigeria							16.65w	
6	Andrew Murphy	Australia							16.57	
7	Vernon Samuels	England	16.45	x					16.45	
8	Paul Nioze	Seychelles							16.25	
9	Matt Sweeney	Australia	15.99w	x	x				15.99w	
10	Mohammed Zaki Sadri	Malaysia							15.78w	
11	Brian Wellman	Bermuda							15.65	
	George Wright	Canada							NM	
