= Igbinoghene =

Igbinoghene is a surname from Nigeria. Notable people with the surname include:

- Festus Igbinoghene (born 1969), Nigerian Olympic athlete
- Noah Igbinoghene (born 1999), American football player, son of Festus
