= Volodymyr Kravchenko =

Volodymyr or Vladimir Kravchenko may refer to:

== In Ukraine ==
- Volodymyr Kravchenko (triple jumper)
- Volodymyr Kravchenko (general)

== In Russia ==
- Vladimir Kravchenko (swimmer)
- Vladimir Kravchenko (politician)
