= Athletics at the 1993 Summer Universiade – Men's triple jump =

The men's triple jump event at the 1993 Summer Universiade was held at the UB Stadium in Buffalo, United States on 14 and 15 July 1993.

== Medalists ==
| Gold | Silver | Bronze |
|---|---|---|
| Tosi Fasinro; Great Britain | Oleg Sakirkin; Kazakhstan | Julian Golley; Great Britain |

== Results ==
=== Qualification ===
| Rank | Group | Athlete | Nationality | Result | Notes |
|---|---|---|---|---|---|
| 1 | ? | Tosi Fasinro | Great Britain | 16.81 | |
| 2 | ? | Mike Harris | United States | 16.76 | |
| 3 | ? | Sergey Arzamasov | Kazakhstan | 16.72 | |
| 4 | ? | Lotfi Khaïda | Algeria | 16.44 | |
| 5 | ? | Oleg Sakirkin | Kazakhstan | 16.38 | |
| 6 | ? | Andrew Owusu | Ghana | 16.31 | |
| 7 | ? | Hao Tong | China | 16.30 | |
| 8 | ? | Julian Golley | Great Britain | 16.19 | |
| 9 | ? | Lenards Ozoliņš | Latvia | 16.18 | |
| 10 | ? | Aleksey Fatyanov | Azerbaijan | 16.16 | |
| 11 | ? | Reggie Jones | United States | 16.10 | |
| 12 | ? | Wikus Olivier | South Africa | 16.06 | |
| 13 | ? | Sergiy Bykov | Ukraine | 16.01 | |
| 14 | ? | Javier Sánchez | Spain | 15.43 | |
| 15 | ? | Sergio Saavedra | Venezuela | 15.40 | |
| 16 | ? | Ndabazinhle Mdhlongwa | Zimbabwe | 15.30 | |
| 17 | ? | Miguel Ángel Padrón | Venezuela | 15.26 | |
| 18 | ? | Javier Ortiz | Puerto Rico | 15.02 | |
| 19 | ? | Osman Cline-Thomas | Sierra Leone | 14.98 | |
| 20 | ? | Manuel Feliciano | Puerto Rico | 14.89 | |

=== Final ===
| Rank | Athlete | Nationality | Result | Notes |
|---|---|---|---|---|
| 1st place, gold medalist(s) | Tosi Fasinro | Great Britain | 16.91 (w) | |
| 2nd place, silver medalist(s) | Oleg Sakirkin | Kazakhstan | 16.89 | |
| 3rd place, bronze medalist(s) | Julian Golley | Great Britain | 16.88 (w) | |
| 4 | Mike Harris | United States | 16.87 | |
| 5 | Sergey Arzamasov | Kazakhstan | 16.82 | |
| 6 | Reggie Jones | United States | 16.64 | |
| 7 | Aleksey Fatyanov | Azerbaijan | 16.50 | |
| 8 | Lotfi Khaïda | Algeria | 16.49 | |
| 9 | Hao Tong | China | 16.26 | |
| 10 | Lenards Ozoliņš | Latvia | 15.59 | |
| | Wikus Olivier | South Africa | NM | |
| | Andrew Owusu | Ghana | DNS | |
