= Athletics at the 1997 Summer Universiade – Men's triple jump =

The men's triple jump event at the 1997 Summer Universiade was held at the Stadio Cibali in Catania, Italy on 26 and 27 August.

== Medalists ==
Gold	Silver	Bronze
Yoelbi Quesada; Cuba	Aliecer Urrutia; Cuba	Robert Howard; United States

== Results ==
=== Qualification ===
Rank	Group	Athlete	Nationality	Result	Notes
1	B	Sergey Izmaylov	Ukraine	16.90	Q
2	B	Andrey Kurennoy	Russia	16.83	Q
3	B	Charles Friedek	Germany	16.80	Q
4	?	Aliecer Urrutia	Cuba	16.75	
5	?	Robert Howard	United States	16.69	
6	?	Yoelbi Quesada	Cuba	16.54	
7	?	Zsolt Czingler	Hungary	16.40	
8	?	Armen Martirosyan	Armenia	16.37	
9	?	Sergey Arzamasov	Kazakhstan	16.37	
10	?	Deldrian Smutherman	United States	16.36	
11	?	Iván Salcedo	Mexico	16.21	
12	?	Volodymyr Kravchenko	Ukraine	16.18	
13	?	Dzmitry Vasilyau	Belarus	16.11	
14	?	Krystian Ciemala	Poland	16.09	
15	?	Takanori Sugibayashi	Japan	16.00	
16	?	Marcio Cardoso	Brazil	15.67	
17	?	Eduardo Martingo	Portugal	15.53	
18	?	Du Jiuhui	China	15.41	
19	?	Djamel Smichet	Algeria	15.34	
20	?	Oscar Valiente	Peru	15.17	
21	?	Ancel Luis Daniel Flores	Honduras	15.06	
22	?	Christian Birk	Denmark	14.56	
23	?	Illiap Ngonga	Chad	14.34	

=== Final ===
Rank	Athlete	Nationality	Result	Notes
1st place, gold medalist(s)	Yoelbi Quesada	Cuba	17.35	
2nd place, silver medalist(s)	Aliecer Urrutia	Cuba	17.11	
3rd place, bronze medalist(s)	Robert Howard	United States	17.08	
4	Andrey Kurennoy	Russia	17.07	
5	Charles Friedek	Germany	16.90	
6	Deldrian Smutherman	United States	16.84	
7	Volodymyr Kravchenko	Ukraine	16.69	
8	Armen Martirosyan	Armenia	16.59	
9	Sergey Arzamasov	Kazakhstan	16.18	
10	Sergey Izmaylov	Ukraine	16.15	
11	Iván Salcedo	Mexico	16.07	
12	Zsolt Czingler	Hungary	15.92	
