= Athletics at the 1996 Summer Olympics – Men's triple jump =

Men's triple jump at the Games of the XXVI Olympiad
- Pictogram for athletics
- Venue: Centennial Olympic Stadium
- Date: 26 July 1996 (qualifications); 27 July 1996 (finals)
- Competitors: 43 from 32 nations
- Winning distance: 18.09 OR

Medalists
| 1st place, gold medalist(s) | | Kenny Harrison; United States |
| 2nd place, silver medalist(s) | | Jonathan Edwards; Great Britain |
| 3rd place, bronze medalist(s) | | Yoelbi Quesada; Cuba |

The final of the men's triple jump event at the 1996 Summer Olympics in Atlanta, Georgia was held on July 27, 1996. There were 43 participating athletes from 32 nations, with two qualifying groups. The maximum number of athletes per nation had been set at 3 since the 1930 Olympic Congress. The top twelve and ties, and all those reaching 17.00 metres advanced to the final. The qualification round was held on July 26, 1996. The event was won by Kenny Harrison of the United States, the nation's second consecutive and sixth overall victory in the men's triple jump. Jonathan Edwards's silver was Great Britain's first medal in the event since 1984; Yoelbi Quesada's bronze was Cuba's first men's triple jump medal ever.

== Summary ==
Coming into the competition, Jonathan Edwards was the only man to have jumped 18 metres, from his remarkable back to back world records at the world championships a year earlier and backing it up with another 18 metre jump in London a few weeks later. At age 30, he was the youngest of the major contenders; defending champion Mike Conley was already 33, and former world champion Kenny Harrison was 31 and coming back from a serious knee injury. Edwards did not look that good in qualifying, unable to make the automatic qualifying mark in two attempts, while Harrison, Conley, Yoelbi Quesada, Brian Wellman and Galin Georgiev did.

In the final, on his first attempt Edwards looked a lot better, his first attempt landing well past the 18 metre mark and approaching his world record. Exiting the pit, he saw the red flag. A few jumpers later, Harrison became the second best jumper in history with a 17.99, adding more than a foot to the Olympic record. On his second attempt, Edwards put another jump deep into the pit and again saw the red flag. Now Edwards was faced with the prospect of getting nothing if he could not land his next jump in the top eight. His next time down the runway was much more careful and controlled, making a far less secure 17.13, which at the moment put him in third place, but was well within the ability of most of the jumpers who followed him in the order. Again following Edwards, Harrison jumped 18.09 m (59 ft 4 in) to become the second man over 18 metres. More impressive, it was into a -0.4 mp/s wind, which remains the longest jump ever into a negative wind. Edwards survived in third behind Quesada. On his next jump he was able to let loose and hit 17.88, an outstanding jump for anybody else in any other competition, but that left him 21 cm behind in second place. In the same round Quesada improved to 17.44 and Conley to 17.40. On his fifth attempt, Edwards soared to within inches of the world record marker, but got another red flag. Having earned the last jump, Harrison passed to rest for one final attempt, if needed. On his final attempt Edwards boomed another one close to the world record, but the red flag ended his evening with Harrison taking the gold. Neither Quesada or Conley improved their position in their last jumps, also fouling both attempts, so Quesada held on to bronze.

== Background ==
This was the 23rd appearance of the event, which is one of 12 athletics events to have been held at every Summer Olympics. The returning finalists from the 1992 Games were gold medalist Mike Conley Sr. of the United States, bronze medalist Frank Rutherford of the Bahamas, fifth-place finisher Brian Wellman of Bermuda, sixth-place finisher Yoelbi Quesada of Cuba, eighth-place finisher Zou Sixin of China, ninth-place finisher Vasiliy Sokov of the Unified Team (now representing Russia), and tenth-place finisher Māris Bružiks of Latvia (who did not start in Atlanta). Jonathan Edwards of Great Britain was the world champion and world record holder, the only man yet to jump over 18 metres. Americans Conley and Kenny Harrison and Cubans Quesada and Aliecer Urrutia joined Edwards in the top tier of contenders.

Armenia, Azerbaijan, Dominica, Kazakhstan, Kyrgyzstan, Lithuania, Russia, Tunisia, Ukraine, and Uzbekistan each made their first appearance in the event. The United States competed for the 22nd time, having missed only the boycotted 1980 Games.

== Competition format ==
The competition used the two-round format introduced in 1936. In the qualifying round, each jumper received three attempts to reach the qualifying distance of 17.00 metres; if fewer than 12 men did so, the top 12 (including all those tied) would advance. In the final round, each athlete had three jumps; the top eight received an additional three jumps, with the best of the six to count.

== Records ==
Prior to the competition, the existing world and Olympic records were as follows.

| World record | Jonathan Edwards (GBR) | 18.29 | Gothenburg, Sweden | 7 August 1995 |
| Olympic record | Mike Conley Sr. (USA) | 17.63 | Barcelona, Spain | 3 August 1992 |

Kenny Harrison jumped 17.99 metres in the first round of the final, breaking the Olympic record. He extended his new record further with his fourth jump, reaching 18.09 metres. Jonathan Edwards also beat the old Olympic record, though his 17.88 metres came after Harrison's first effort.

== Schedule ==
All times are Eastern Daylight Time (UTC-4)

| Date | Time | Round |
|---|---|---|
| Friday, 26 July 1996 | 18:10 | Qualifying |
| Saturday, 27 July 1996 | 19:00 | Final |

== Results ==
=== Qualifying ===
Qualification Rules: Qualifying performance 17.00 (Q) or at least 12 best performers (q) advance to the Final.

| Rank | Group | Athlete | Nation | 1 | 2 | 3 | Distance | Notes |
|---|---|---|---|---|---|---|---|---|
| 1 | A | Kenny Harrison | United States | 17.58 | — | — | 17.58 | Q |
| 2 | B | Mike Conley Sr. | United States | 17.20 | — | — | 17.20 | Q |
| 3 | A | Yoelbi Quesada | Cuba | 17.19 | — | — | 17.19 | Q |
| 4 | A | Brian Wellman | Bermuda | 17.10 | — | — | 17.10 | Q |
| 5 | B | Galin Georgiev | Bulgaria | 17.02 | — | — | 17.02 | Q |
| 6 | B | Jonathan Edwards | Great Britain | 16.93 | 16.96 | — | 16.96 | q |
| 7 | A | Robert Howard | United States | 16.83 | 16.76 | 16.92 | 16.92 | q |
| 8 | B | Volodymyr Kravchenko | Ukraine | 16.71 | 16.90 | X | 16.90 | q |
| 9 | A | Viktor Sotnikov | Russia | 16.86 | X | 16.19 | 16.86 | q |
| 10 | A | Jérôme Romain | Dominica | 16.80 | X | X | 16.80 | q |
| 11 | B | Armen Martirosyan | Armenia | 15.71 | 16.68 | 16.74 | 16.74 | q |
| 12 | A | Frank Rutherford | Bahamas | X | 16.38 | 16.73 | 16.73 | q |
| 13 | A | Francis Agyepong | Great Britain | 16.71 | 16.68 | X | 16.71 | |
| 14 | B | Charles Friedek | Germany | X | 16.71 | 16.58 | 16.71 | |
| 15 | B | Aliecer Urrutia | Cuba | 16.71 | 16.54 | X | 16.71 | |
| 16 | B | Vasiliy Sokov | Russia | X | 16.68 | X | 16.68 | |
| 17 | B | Rogel Nachum | Israel | 15.86 | 16.67 | 16.53 | 16.67 | |
| 18 | A | Anísio Silva | Brazil | 16.38 | 16.67 | 16.08 | 16.67 | |
| 19 | A | Carlos Calado | Portugal | 16.43 | 16.65 | X | 16.65 | |
| 20 | B | Yoel García | Cuba | 15.94 | X | 16.62 | 16.62 | |
| 21 | B | Zou Sixin | China | 16.13 | 16.44 | 16.53 | 16.53 | |
| 22 | B | Messias José Baptista | Brazil | 16.02 | 16.45 | 16.13 | 16.45 | |
| 23 | B | Audrius Raizgys | Lithuania | 16.38 | X | 16.06 | 16.38 | |
| 24 | B | Zsolt Czingler | Hungary | 16.22 | 16.35 | X | 16.35 | |
| 25 | B | Salem Al-Ahmadi | Saudi Arabia | X | 15.97 | 16.30 | 16.30 | |
| 26 | B | Francis Dodoo | Ghana | X | X | 16.24 | 16.24 | |
| 27 | A | Vasif Asadov | Azerbaijan | X | X | 16.21 | 16.21 | |
| 28 | A | Jacob Katonon | Kenya | 16.08 | 16.17 | X | 16.17 | |
| 29 | A | Stoyko Tsonov | Bulgaria | 16.00 | 16.15 | X | 16.15 | |
| 30 | B | Sigurd Njerve | Norway | 15.22 | X | 16.15 | 16.15 | |
| 31 | B | Aleksey Fatyanov | Azerbaijan | 16.14 | X | 16.13 | 16.14 | |
| 32 | B | Igor Sautkin | Russia | X | X | 16.06 | 16.06 | |
| 33 | A | Tibor Ordina | Hungary | 16.04 | X | X | 16.04 | |
| 34 | A | Andrew Murphy | Australia | 15.97 | X | 16.00 | 16.00 | |
| 35 | A | Festus Igbinoghene | Nigeria | 15.95 | X | 15.72 | 15.95 | |
| 36 | A | Sergey Arzamasov | Kazakhstan | 15.91 | X | — | 15.91 | |
| 37 | A | Maksim Smetanin | Kyrgyzstan | 15.83 | 15.90 | X | 15.90 | |
| 38 | B | Yevgeniy Petin | Uzbekistan | X | 15.58 | 15.89 | 15.89 | |
| 39 | B | Paul Nioze | Seychelles | 15.63 | 15.43 | X | 15.63 | |
| 40 | B | Kawan Lovelace | Belize | 15.40 | X | 14.97 | 15.40 | |
| 41 | A | Hussain Jasim | Iraq | 15.19 | 15.27 | X | 15.27 | |
| 42 | A | Ndabazinhle Mdhlongwa | Zimbabwe | 14.47 | X | X | 14.47 | |
| 43 | A | Karim Sassi | Tunisia | X | X | 14.25 | 14.25 | |
| — | A | Māris Bružiks | Latvia | | | | DNS | |

=== Final ===
| Rank | Athlete | Nation | 1 | 2 | 3 | 4 | 5 | 6 | Distance | Notes |
|---|---|---|---|---|---|---|---|---|---|---|
| 1st place, gold medalist(s) | Kenny Harrison | United States | 17.99 OR | X | — | 18.09 OR | — | X | 18.09 | OR |
| 2nd place, silver medalist(s) | Jonathan Edwards | Great Britain | X | X | 17.13 | 17.88 | X | X | 17.88 | |
| 3rd place, bronze medalist(s) | Yoelbi Quesada | Cuba | 17.04 | 17.29 | X | 17.44 | X | X | 17.44 | |
| 4 | Mike Conley Sr. | United States | 17.08 | X | 16.17 | 17.40 | X | X | 17.40 | |
| 5 | Armen Martirosyan | Armenia | 16.85 | X | 16.97 | 16.48 | X | 16.34 | 16.97 | |
| 6 | Brian Wellman | Bermuda | 16.95 | X | 16.82 | X | X | X | 16.95 | |
| 7 | Galin Georgiev | Bulgaria | 16.85 | X | X | X | X | 16.92 | 16.92 | |
| 8 | Robert Howard | United States | 16.72 | 16.83 | 16.90 | X | 16.44 | 16.52 | 16.90 | |
| 9 | Viktor Sotnikov | Russia | 16.84 | 16.53 | 16.56 | Did not advance | | | 16.84 | |
| 10 | Volodymyr Kravchenko | Ukraine | 16.35 | 15.92 | 16.62 | Did not advance | | | 16.62 | |
| 11 | Frank Rutherford | Bahamas | 16.38 | X | 16.36 | Did not advance | | | 16.38 | |
| — | Jérôme Romain | Dominica | X | — | — | Did not advance | | | No mark | |

== See also ==
- 1995 World Championships Men's Triple Jump
- 1997 World Championships Men's Triple Jump
