= 1994 European Athletics U23 Cup =

II European Athletics U23 Cup
- Dates: July 30–31
- Host city: Ostrava, Czech Republic (Division A); Lillehammer, Norway (Division B)
- Level: U-23
- Events: 35 (19 men, 16 women)

The 2nd European Athletics U23 Cup was held on July 30–31, 1994. The participating teams were classified into two divisions, A and B.

Results were compiled from various sources.

== Division A ==
The contest for Division A took place in Ostrava, Czech Republic.

=== Team trophies ===
==== Men ====
The host country is highlighted in lavender blue

Rank	Nation	Points
1	Germany	104
2	Italy	100
3	Russia	100
4	France	91
5	United Kingdom	85
6	Greece	75
7	Spain	67
8	Czech Republic	55

==== Women ====
The host country is highlighted in lavender blue

Rank	Nation	Points
1	Russia	108
2	Germany	91
3	Romania	82
4	Czech Republic	65
5	United Kingdom	62
6	Italy	61
7	Finland	58
8	Bulgaria	47

=== Results ===
==== Men ====
Event	Gold		Silver		Bronze	
100 metres (wind: -2.7 m/s)	Toby Box; Great Britain	10.47	Christian Konieczny; Germany	10.58	Alessandro Orlandi; Italy	10.61
200 metres (wind: -0.9 m/s)	Evgenios Papadopoulos; Greece	21.05	Toby Box; Great Britain	21.06	Konstantin Demin; Russia	21.10
400 metres	Andrey Boykov; Russia	46.62	Thomas Kelikke; Germany	46.63	Adrian Patrick; Great Britain	47.09
800 metres	Jimmy Jean-Joseph; France	1:50.34	Marco Chiavarini; Italy	1:51.10	Oliver Poeschl; Germany	1:51.46
1500 metres	Salvatore Vincenti; Italy	3:56.50	Dominique Löser; Germany	3:56.78	Mateo Canellas; Spain	3:56.82
5000 metres	Maurizio Leone; Italy	14:03.89	Vener Kashaev; Russia	14:05.62	Jan Peshava; Czech Republic	14:14.93
110 metres hurdles (wind: -0.4 m/s)	Falk Balzer; Germany	13.82	Neil Owen; United Kingdom	13.97	David Kafka; France	14.02
400 metres hurdles	Ashraf Saber; Italy	49.87	Aleksandr Belikov; Russia	50.68	Jimmy Coco; France	51.54
3000 metres steeplechase	Stéphane Desaulty; France	8:46.53	Damian Kallabis; Germany	8:47.11	Eliseo Martín; Spain	8:53.71
4 × 100 metres relay	Great Britain (GBR); Tremayne Rutherford; Toby Box; Douglas Walker; Darren Campbell	39.23	France (FRA); Needy Guims; Sébastien Carrat; Sébastien Saye; Stéphane Cali	39.70	Greece (GRE)	40.22
4 × 400 metres relay	Germany (GER); Andreas Hein; Markus Rau; Alexander Müller; Thomas Kelikke	3:05.48	Italy (ITA); Pietro Pagliara; Walter Groff; Michele D'Angelo; Ashraf Saber	3:05.53	Great Britain (GBR)	3:07.16
High jump	Dimitrios Kokotis; Greece	2.24 m	Sergey Klyugin; Russia	2.21 m	Luca Zampieri; Italy	2.21 m
Pole vault	Gérald Baudouin; France	5.70 m	Viktor Chistiakov; Russia	5.65 m	Daniel Martí; Spain	5.50 m
Long jump	Roman Orlík; Czech Republic	7.85 m	Georg Ackermann; Germany	7.82 m	Marco Alberti; Italy	7.68 m
Triple jump	Tosi Fasinro; Great Britain	16.74 m w	Igor Sautkin; Russia	16.57 m	Julio López; Spain	16.51 m
Shot put	Manuel Martínez; Spain	19.93 m	Victor Kapustin; Russia	18.60 m	Stefan Poehn; Germany	17.89 m
Discus throw	Nikolay Orekhov; Russia	59.56 m	Marek Bílek; Czech Republic	58.60 m	Glen Smith; Great Britain	56.60 m
Hammer throw	Marcel Kunkel; Germany	71.88 m	Alexandros Papadimitriou; Greece	71.54 m	David Chaussinand; France	70.36 m
Javelin throw	Kostas Gatsioudis; Greece	83.82 m	Sergey Makarov; Russia	82.54 m	Mathias Holde; Germany	76.50 m

==== Women ====
Event	Gold		Silver		Bronze	
100 metres	Natalya Anisimova; Russia	11.60	Bettina Zipp; Germany	11.68	Hana Benešová; Czech Republic	11.81
200 metres	Yekaterina Leshchova; Russia	23.52	Ionela Târlea; Romania	23.62	Monika Gachevska; Bulgaria	23.66
400 metres	Anja Rücker; Germany	51.42	Natalya Khrushcheleva; Russia	52.44	Ludmila Formanová; Czech Republic	52.59
800 metres	Tatyana Grigoryeva; Russia	2:01.56	Kati Kovacs; Germany	2:02.96	Andrea Šuldesová; Czech Republic	2:04.03
1500 metres	Yekaterina Dedkova; Russia	4:17.16	Eliza Wanyini; Italy	4:19.08	Carmen Wüstenhagen; Germany	4:19.79
3000 metres	Gabriela Szabo; Romania	9:12.42	Lidia Vasilevskaya; Russia	9:13.54	Dörte Köster; Germany	9:19.68
100 metres hurdles	Erica Niculae; Romania	13.50	Nikola Spinova; Czech Republic	13.72	Angie Thorp; Great Britain	13.77
400 metres hurdles	Ionela Tîrlea; Romania	56.87	Ekaterina Nikishova; Russia	57.36	Louise Branning; Great Britain	58.80
4 × 100 metres relay	Russia (RUS); Natalya Anisimova; Yekaterina Grigoryeva; Oksana Khreskina; Yulia Timofeeva	44.22	Germany (GER); Bettina Zipp; Kristina Horman; Claudia Volk; Birgit Rockmeier	44.60	Bulgaria (BUL); Ekaterina Tosheva-Mashova; Nora Ivanova; Viara Georgieva; Monika Gachevska	44.92
4 × 400 metres relay	Germany (GER); Silvia Steimle; Sandra Kuschmann; Anja Rücker; Gabi Rockmeier	3:30.54	Russia (RUS); Olga Kotlyarova; Natalya Sharova; Irina Platonova; Natalya Khrushcheleva	3:31.46	Czech Republic (CZE); Jitka Burianová; Denisa Obdržálková; Hana Benešová; Ludmila Formanová	3:33.43
High jump	Zuzana Kováčiková; Czech Republic	1.94	Viktoriya Fyodorova; Russia	1.92 m	Eleonora Milusheva; Bulgaria	1.90 m
Long jump	Lyudmila Galkina; Russia	6.48	Christina Galli; Italy	6.31 m	Cristina Nicolau; Romania	6.27 m
Triple jump^{[nb1]}	Elena Dumitrascu; Romania	13.79	Nadia Morandini; Italy	13.77 m	Nkechi Madubuko; Germany	13.27 m
Shot put	Irina Korzhanenko; Russia	18.36	Marika Tuliniemi; Finland	17.41 m	Nadine Kleinert; Germany	16.78 m
Discus throw	Natalya Sadova; Russia	60.56	Atanaska Angelova; Bulgaria	59.14 m	Anja Möllenbeck; Germany	57.46 m
Javelin throw	Dörthe Barby; Germany	57.56	Claudia Isăilă; Romania	56.96 m	Claudia Coslovich; Italy	56.70 m

- ^{nb1} Russian Yelena Lysak originally won the women's triple jump with a clearance of 13.88 m. However, she failed the subsequent doping test and she was disqualified from the competition and banned for four years.

== Division B ==
The competition for Division B took place in Lillehammer, Norway.

=== Team scores ===
==== Men ====
The host country is highlighted in lavender blue

Rank	Nation	Points
1	Poland	100.5
2	Ukraine	91
3	Finland	86.5
4	Norway	83
5	Hungary	80
6	Cyprus	44
7	Austria	40
8	Bulgaria	DNS

==== Women ====
The host country is highlighted in lavender blue

Rank	Nation	Points
1	Ukraine	105
2	France	103
3	Poland	83
4	Hungary	68
5	Greece	63
6	Spain	61
7	Norway	48
8	Netherlands	45

=== Results ===
==== Women ====
Event	Gold		Silver		Bronze	
100 metres (wind: +0.6 m/s)	Iryna Pukha; Ukraine	11.60	Ingvild Larsen; Norway	11.61	Delphine Combe; France	11.65
200 metres (wind: +1.1 m/s)	Anzhela Balakhonova; Ukraine	23.63	Aline André; France	23.84	[[]] [[|]]	
400 metres	Marie-Louise Bévis; France	53.46	Svetlana Tverdokhleb; Ukraine	53.74	Miriam Bravo; Spain	54.34
800 metres	Anna Jakubczak; Poland	2:03.87	Séverine Foulon; France	2:03.95	Sonia Álvarez; Spain	2:05.10
1500 metres	Sylvia Kruijer; Netherlands	4:17.34	[[]] [[|]]		[[]] [[|]]	
3000 metres	Mónika Tóth; Hungary	9:32.34	Magdalena Ruśniok; Poland	9:34.52	Malika Coutant; France	9:35.77
100 metres hurdles (wind: +1.5 m/s)	Yelena Sukhoruchenko; Ukraine	13.17	Nadège Joseph; France	13.28	[[]] [[|]]	
400 metres hurdles	Maya Shemchyshena; Ukraine	57.78	Isabelle Dherbécourt; France	57.83	Eva Paniagua; Spain	58.70
High jump	Irina Mikhalchenko; Ukraine	1.88 m	Dóra Győrffy; Hungary	1.81 m	Katell Courgeon; France	1.81 m
Long jump	Niki Xanthou; Greece	6.72 m	Anastasia Mahob; France	6.64 m w	[[]] [[|]]	
Triple jump	Olena Hovorova; Ukraine	14.22 m	Valérie Guiyoule; France	13.24 m	[[]] [[|]]	
Shot put	Corrie de Bruin; Netherlands	16.99 m	[[]] [[|]]		[[]] [[|]]	
Discus throw	Olena Antonova; Ukraine	57.84 m	[[]] [[|]]		[[]] [[|]]	
Javelin throw	Rose May Poilagi; France	56.86 m	Ewa Rybak; Poland	55.56 m	[[]] [[|]]	
4 × 100 metres relay	France (FRA); Isabelle Correa; Sandra Chéri-Zécoté; Delphine Combe; Aline André	44.41	Ukraine (UKR)	44.41	[[|]] ()	
4 × 400 metres relay	France (FRA); Lucie Rangassamy; Marie-Françoise Opheltès; Magalie Blondel; Marie-Louise Bévis	3:34.39	Ukraine (UKR)	3:34.57	[[|]] ()	
