= 2026 Tomsk Oblast legislative election =

Regional legislative election in Russia

- 18–20 September 2026

All 42 seats in the Legislative Duma 22 seats needed for a majority
- Turnout: 43.50% ▲3.29 pp
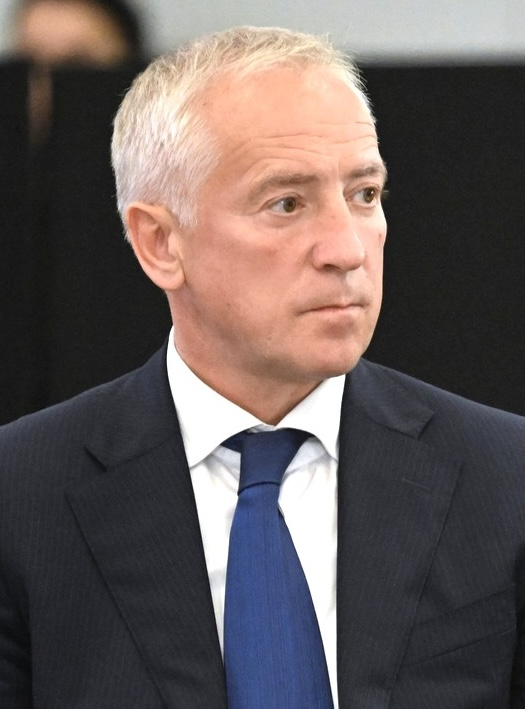

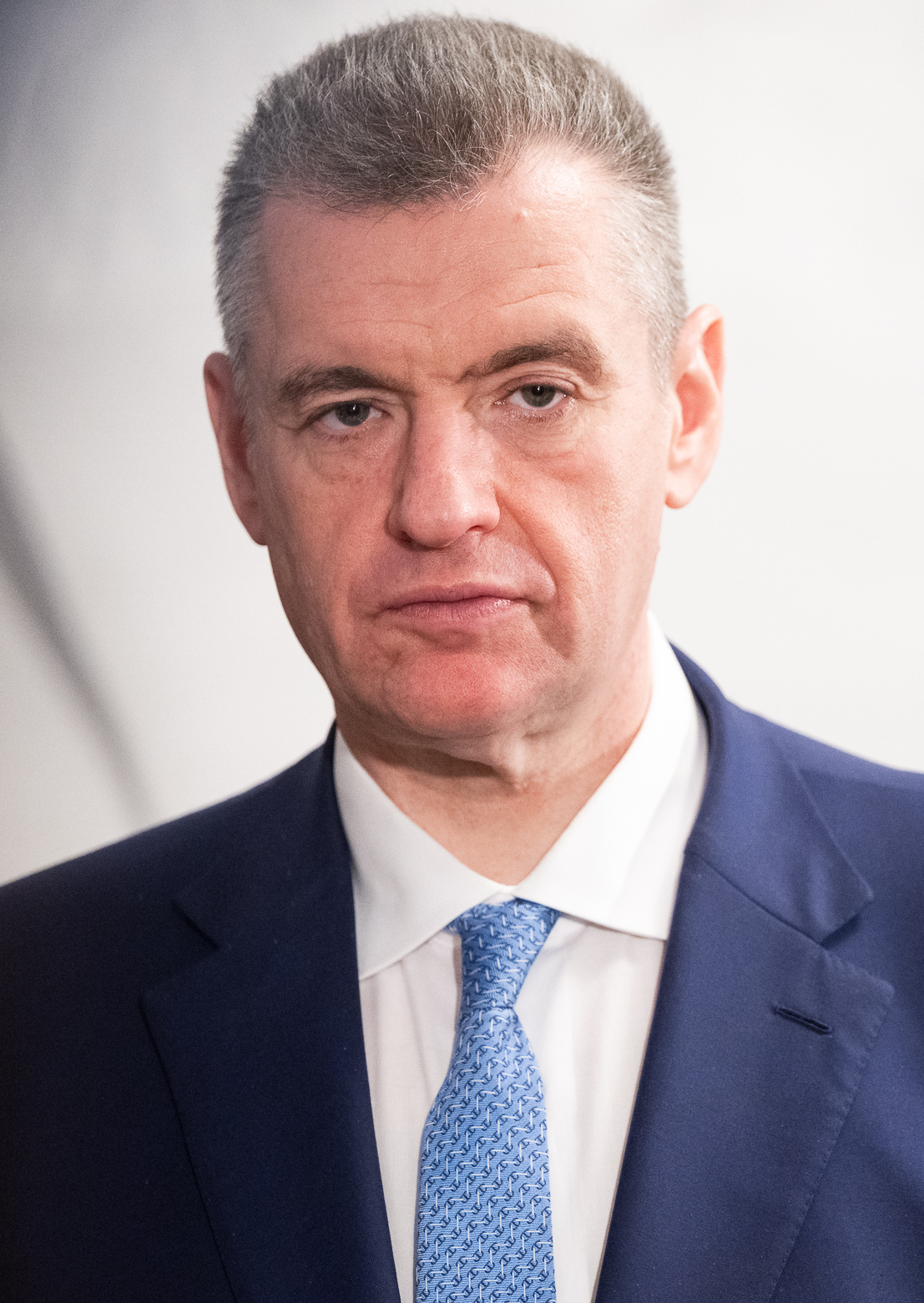

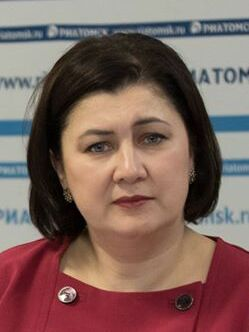
	Majority party	Minority party	Third party
			NL
Candidate	Vladimir Mazur	Andrey Petrov	Sergey Kukhalsky
Party	United Russia	CPRF	New People
Last election	33.21%, 27 seats	24.42%, 7 seats	10.19%, 2 seats
Seats won	28	6	3
Seat change	▲1	▼1	▲1
Popular vote	125,037	68,130	46,509
Percentage	38.67%	21.07%	14.38%
Swing	▲5.46 pp	▼3.35 pp	▲4.19 pp
	Fourth party	Fifth party
Candidate	Leonid Slutsky	Galina Nemtseva
Party	LDPR	A Just Russia
Last election	12.63%, 3 seats	11.01%, 3 seats
Seats won	2	3
Seat change	▼1	Steady
Popular vote	39,262	34,459
Percentage	12.14%	10.66%
Swing	▼0.49 pp	▼0.35 pp
Chairman before election
Oksana Kozlovskaya
United Russia
Elected Chairman
Oksana Kozlovskaya
United Russia
Senator before election
Vladimir Kravchenko
United Russia
Senator after election
Vladimir Kravchenko
United Russia

The 2026 Legislative Duma of Tomsk Oblast election took place on 18–20 September 2026, on common election day, coinciding with the 2026 Russian legislative election. All 42 seats in the Legislative Assembly were up for re-election.

United Russia retained its overwhelming majority in the Legislative Duma, winning 38.5% of the vote and 19 single-mandate constituencies. Communist Party of the Russian Federation and Liberal Democratic Party of Russia retained their factions, losing one deputy each. New People saw major gains, increasing its vote share by nearly half and coming in third by popular vote.

== Electoral system ==
Under current election laws, the Legislative Duma is elected for a term of five years, with parallel voting. 21 seats are elected by party-list proportional representation with a 5% electoral threshold, with the other half elected in 21 single-member constituencies by first-past-the-post voting. Seats in the proportional part are allocated using the Imperiali quota, modified to ensure that every party list, which passes the threshold, receives at least one mandate.

== Candidates ==
=== Party lists ===
To register regional lists of candidates, parties need to collect 0.5% of signatures of all registered voters in Tomsk Oblast.

The following parties were relieved from the necessity to collect signatures:

- United Russia
- Communist Party of the Russian Federation
- Liberal Democratic Party of Russia
- A Just Russia
- New People
- Yabloko

№	Party	Oblast-wide list	Candidates	Territorial groups	Status
1	United Russia	Vladimir Mazur • Viktor Rulevsky • Sergey Sechenov • Vladimir Kravchenko • Natalya Opanasyuk	40	7	Registered
2	Liberal Democratic Party	Leonid Slutsky • Stanislav Karpov	34	7	Registered
3	A Just Russia	Galina Nemtseva • Marina Kolykhayeva	63	21	Registered
5	Communist Party	Andrey Petrov • Maksim Luchshev • Vladimir Cholakhyan	56	21	Registered
6	New People	Sergey Kukhalsky • Aleksandr Tsin-De-Shan • Yekaterina Radionova	24	7	Registered
~~4~~	Yabloko	Vasily Yeryomin • Yevgeny Kaverzin	12	5	Disqualified

Party of Growth, which participated in the last election, was dissolved and merged into New People. Yabloko was initially registered for the legislative election but was disqualified on September 11, 2026, by the Tomsk Oblast Court for intellectual property violations, unlawful social media campaigning and financing discrepancies.

=== Single-mandate constituencies ===
21 single-mandate constituencies were formed in Tomsk Oblast. To register candidates in single-mandate constituencies need to collect 3% of signatures of registered voters in the constituency.

Number of candidates in single-mandate constituencies
Party	Candidates	
Party	Nominated	Registered
United Russia	21	21
Communist Party	20	20
Liberal Democratic Party	21	20
A Just Russia	20	20
New People	20	18
Yabloko	7	7
Independent	4	0
Total	113	106

== Results ==
=== Results by party lists ===
Summary of the 18–20 September 2026 Legislative Duma of Tomsk Oblast election results
Party	Party list					Constituency		Total	
Party	Votes	%	±pp	Seats	+/–	Seats	+/–	Seats	+/–
United Russia	125,037	38.67	▲5.46	9	▲1	19	Steady	28	▲1
Communist Party	68,130	21.07	▼3.35	5	▼1	1	Steady	6	▼1
New People	46,509	14.38	▲4.19	3	▲1	0	Steady	3	▲1
Liberal Democratic Party	39,262	12.14	▼0.49	2	▼1	0	Steady	2	▼1
A Just Russia	34,459	10.66	▼0.35	2	Steady	1	Steady	3	Steady
Yabloko	–	–	–	–	–	0	Steady	0	Steady
Invalid ballots	9,921	3.07	▼0.16	—	—	—	—	—	—
Total	323,318	100.00	—	21	Steady	21	Steady	42	Steady
Turnout	323,318	43.50	▲3.29	—	—	—	—	—	—
Registered voters	743,226	100.00	—	—	—	—	—	—	—

Oksana Kozlovskaya (United Russia) was re-elected as Chairwoman of the Legislative Duma, while incumbent Senator Vladimir Kravchenko (United Russia) was re-appointed to the Federation Council.

=== Results in single-member constituencies ===
==== District 1 ====
Summary of the 18–20 September 2026 Legislative Duma of Tomsk Oblast election in District 1
Candidate	Party	Votes	%
Ivan Pushkarev (incumbent)	United Russia	5,548	36.99%
Natalia Testova	Communist Party	2,929	19.53%
Inga Pervushina	A Just Russia	2,914	19.43%
Tatyana Sorochinskaya	Yabloko	2,024	13.49%
Nikita Veligzhanin	Liberal Democratic Party	1,065	7.10%
Total		15,000	100%

==== District 2 ====
Summary of the 18–20 September 2026 Legislative Duma of Tomsk Oblast election in District 2
Candidate	Party	Votes	%
Vladimir Reznikov (incumbent)	United Russia	4,954	33.38%
Aleksandr Tsin-De-Shan	New People	2,906	19.58%
Magerram Gasanov	Communist Party	2,633	17.74%
Roman Stepichev	A Just Russia	2,305	15.53%
Mark Shekhovtsev	Liberal Democratic Party	1,456	9.81%
Total		14,842	100%

==== District 3 ====
Summary of the 18–20 September 2026 Legislative Duma of Tomsk Oblast election in District 3
Candidate	Party	Votes	%
Galina Nemtseva (incumbent)	A Just Russia	5,162	33.79%
Irina Grabtsevich	United Russia	4,731	30.97%
Aleksandr Chunaryov	New People	2,483	16.25%
Temur Isakov	Communist Party	2,374	15.54%
Total		15,276	100%

==== District 4 ====
Summary of the 18–20 September 2026 Legislative Duma of Tomsk Oblast election in District 4
Candidate	Party	Votes	%
Sergey Avtonomov (incumbent)	United Russia	5,504	37.23%
Yevgeny Kaverzin	Yabloko	2,397	16.21%
Slaventiy Veliky	Communist Party	2,390	16.17%
Yury Polonyankin	A Just Russia	2,232	15.10%
Snezhana Rudenko	Liberal Democratic Party	1,795	12.14%
Total		14,784	100%

==== District 5 ====
Summary of the 18–20 September 2026 Legislative Duma of Tomsk Oblast election in District 5
Candidate	Party	Votes	%
Oleg Pravdin (incumbent)	United Russia	4,164	35.04%
Larisa Aleyeva	Communist Party	2,052	17.27%
Anna Sannikova	New People	1,710	14.39%
Ivan Andreyev	Yabloko	1,360	11.44%
Aleksey Savitsky	Liberal Democratic Party	1,154	9.71%
Viktor Zakharov	A Just Russia	1,115	9.38%
Total		11,883	100%

==== District 6 ====
Summary of the 18–20 September 2026 Legislative Duma of Tomsk Oblast election in District 6
Candidate	Party	Votes	%
Pavel Astapenko	United Russia	4,229	32.42%
Dmitry Alimpiyev	Communist Party	3,201	24.54%
Sergey Berezovikov	New People	2,223	17.04%
Mikhail Zakharov	A Just Russia	1,718	13.17%
Yury Voroshilin	Liberal Democratic Party	1,149	8.81%
Total		13,043	100%

==== District 7 ====
Summary of the 18–20 September 2026 Legislative Duma of Tomsk Oblast election in District 7
Candidate	Party	Votes	%
Andrey Petrov	Communist Party	5,889	42.33%
Natalya Krasnitskaya	United Russia	4,878	35.06%
Diana Kostyrina	A Just Russia	2,320	16.68%
Total		13,913	100%

==== District 8 ====
Summary of the 18–20 September 2026 Legislative Duma of Tomsk Oblast election in District 8
Candidate	Party	Votes	%
Sergey Panov	United Russia	5,762	40.06%
Vasily Yeryomin	Yabloko	2,365	16.44%
Aleksandr Polevechko	Liberal Democratic Party	2,168	15.07%
Vyacheslav Solovyev	New People	2,039	14.18%
Konstantin Matreninsky	A Just Russia	1,478	10.28%
Total		14,382	100%

==== District 9 ====
Summary of the 18–20 September 2026 Legislative Duma of Tomsk Oblast election in District 9
Candidate	Party	Votes	%
Igor Stepanov	United Russia	5,165	35.12%
Pavel Yudenko (incumbent)	Communist Party	2,823	19.20%
Yekaterina Rekhtina	New People	2,646	17.99%
Natalya Kamenskaya	Liberal Democratic Party	1,854	12.61%
Yulia Smarygina	A Just Russia	1,704	11.59%
Total		14,705	100%

==== District 10 ====
Summary of the 18–20 September 2026 Legislative Duma of Tomsk Oblast election in District 10
Candidate	Party	Votes	%
Sergey Kotov (incumbent)	United Russia	7,865	39.83%
Nikolay Frolov	Communist Party	3,177	16.09%
Vladimir Brodsky	Yabloko	2,515	12.74%
Natalya Zazhitskaya	New People	2,090	10.58%
Olga Chikalo	A Just Russia	1,850	9.37%
Yevgeny Samutinsky	Liberal Democratic Party	1,684	8.53%
Total		19,746	100%

==== District 11 ====
Summary of the 18–20 September 2026 Legislative Duma of Tomsk Oblast election in District 11
Candidate	Party	Votes	%
Valery Osiptsov (incumbent)	United Russia	5,915	34.55%
Aleksandr Rostovtsev	Communist Party	4,185	24.45%
Tatyana Zhurova	Yabloko	1,730	10.11%
Larisa Slivina	A Just Russia	1,639	9.57%
Yevgeny Syrkin	Liberal Democratic Party	1,639	9.57%
Anastasia Zakharova	New People	1,564	9.14%
Total		17,119	100%

==== District 12 ====
Summary of the 18–20 September 2026 Legislative Duma of Tomsk Oblast election in District 12
Candidate	Party	Votes	%
Maksim Dyagilev	United Russia	6,871	43.65%
Stanislav Solomin	Liberal Democratic Party	2,699	17.15%
Vladimir Shcherbakov	Communist Party	2,684	17.05%
Denis Gazizov	New People	1,887	11.99%
Svetlana Shmakova	A Just Russia	1,168	7.42%
Total		15,741	100%

==== District 13 ====
Summary of the 18–20 September 2026 Legislative Duma of Tomsk Oblast election in District 13
Candidate	Party	Votes	%
Andrey Nikul	United Russia	5,270	32.17%
Konstantin Galimov-Yermak	Communist Party	4,546	27.75%
Anton Melnikov	Liberal Democratic Party	2,075	12.67%
Yekaterina Radionova	New People	1,989	12.14%
Natalya Gridneva	A Just Russia	1,885	11.51%
Total		16,381	100%

==== District 14 ====
Summary of the 18–20 September 2026 Legislative Duma of Tomsk Oblast election in District 14
Candidate	Party	Votes	%
Oksana Kozlovskaya	United Russia	8,372	45.36%
Yevgeny Stepykin	Liberal Democratic Party	3,404	18.44%
Yaroslav Mazhnov	Communist Party	2,680	14.52%
Andrey Kornyakov	New People	2,083	11.29%
Ivan Fyodorov	A Just Russia	1,343	7.28%
Total		18,458	100%

==== District 15 ====
Summary of the 18–20 September 2026 Legislative Duma of Tomsk Oblast election in District 15
Candidate	Party	Votes	%
Igor Batragareyev	United Russia	5,368	40.27%
Sergey Mishin	Communist Party	3,363	25.23%
Sofya Radchenko	New People	2,379	17.85%
Aleksandr Fomenko	Liberal Democratic Party	1,627	12.21%
Total		13,329	100%

==== District 16 ====
Summary of the 18–20 September 2026 Legislative Duma of Tomsk Oblast election in District 16
Candidate	Party	Votes	%
Yury Drozdov (incumbent)	United Russia	5,236	33.16%
Maria Ustinova	New People	3,407	21.58%
Sergey Yegorov	Communist Party	2,771	17.55%
Sergey Glazkov	A Just Russia	2,561	16.22%
Margarita Postnova	Liberal Democratic Party	1,396	8.84%
Total		15,788	100%

==== District 17 ====
Summary of the 18–20 September 2026 Legislative Duma of Tomsk Oblast election in District 17
Candidate	Party	Votes	%
Dmitry Kadashnikov	United Russia	5,258	41.34%
Vladimir Sadovik	Communist Party	2,785	21.90%
Darya Petrova	New People	1,572	12.36%
Anastasia Kharlova	Liberal Democratic Party	1,351	10.62%
Margarita Sukhushina	A Just Russia	1,236	9.72%
Total		12,718	100%

==== District 18 ====
Summary of the 18–20 September 2026 Legislative Duma of Tomsk Oblast election in District 18
Candidate	Party	Votes	%
Gennady Sergeyenko (incumbent)	United Russia	8,225	47.59%
Aleksey Kulesh	Communist Party	2,576	14.90%
Aleksandr Dyundik	Liberal Democratic Party	2,258	13.06%
Dmitry Miroshnikov	A Just Russia	2,231	12.91%
Sergey Kukhalsky	New People	1,353	7.83%
Total		17,283	100%

==== District 19 ====
Summary of the 18–20 September 2026 Legislative Duma of Tomsk Oblast election in District 19
Candidate	Party	Votes	%
Yekaterina Sobkanyuk (incumbent)	United Russia	5,899	34.40%
Aleksandr Gubin	Communist Party	4,193	24.45%
Natalya Sitnikova	New People	2,015	11.75%
Marina Khasanova	Yabloko	1,961	11.44%
Alyona Lapteva	Liberal Democratic Party	1,299	7.58%
Anastasia Martyn	A Just Russia	1,229	7.17%
Total			100%

==== District 20 ====
Summary of the 18–20 September 2026 Legislative Duma of Tomsk Oblast election in District 20
Candidate	Party	Votes	%
Paruyr Yavrumyan (incumbent)	United Russia	6,553	41.19%
Darya Pirogova	Communist Party	3,209	20.17%
Yury Golubovsky	Liberal Democratic Party	2,899	18.22%
Vladimir Prokhorenko	A Just Russia	1,496	9.40%
Andrey Reidel	New People	1,081	6.79%
Total			100%

==== District 21 ====
Summary of the 18–20 September 2026 Legislative Duma of Tomsk Oblast election in District 21
Candidate	Party	Votes	%
Dmitry Nikulin	United Russia	5,512	40.47%
Aleksey Fyodorov	Communist Party	2,577	18.92%
Marina Bazhina	A Just Russia	2,079	15.27%
Leonid Terekhov	Liberal Democratic Party	1,803	13.24%
Vladislav Butenko	New People	1,092	8.02%
Total		13,619	100%

=== Members ===
Incumbent deputies are highlighted with bold, elected members who declined to take a seat are marked with ~~strikethrough~~.

Constituency
No.	Member	Party
1	Ivan Pushkarev	United Russia
2	Vladimir Reznikov	United Russia
3	Galina Nemtseva	A Just Russia
4	Sergey Avtonomov	United Russia
5	Oleg Pravdin	United Russia
6	Pavel Astapenko	United Russia
7	Andrey Petrov	Communist Party
8	Sergey Panov	United Russia
9	Igor Stepanov	United Russia
10	Sergey Kotov	United Russia
11	Valery Osiptsov	United Russia
12	Maksim Dyagilev	United Russia
13	Andrey Nikul	United Russia
14	Oksana Kozlovskaya	United Russia
15	Igor Batragareyev	United Russia
16	Yury Drozdov	United Russia
17	Dmitry Kadashnikov	United Russia
18	Gennady Sergeyenko	United Russia
19	Yekaterina Sobkanyuk	United Russia
20	Paruyr Yavrumyan	United Russia
21	Dmitry Nikulin	United Russia

Party lists
Member	Party
~~Vladimir Mazur~~	United Russia
Viktor Rulevsky	United Russia
~~Sergey Sechenov~~	United Russia
Vladimir Kravchenko	United Russia
Natalya Opanasyuk	United Russia
~~Marat Sharafutdinov~~	United Russia
Konstantin Sheptalin	United Russia
Aleksandr Kupriyanets	United Russia
Natalia Chabovskaya	United Russia
Maksim Grishchenko	United Russia
Mikhail Kolmakov	United Russia
Nikita Trotsenko	United Russia
Maksim Luchshev	Communist Party
~~Vladimir Cholakhyan~~	Communist Party
Aleksey Fyodorov	Communist Party
Dmitry Alimpiyev	Communist Party
Olesya Bozhok	Communist Party
Aleksandr Gubin	Communist Party
Sergey Kukhalsky	New People
Aleksandr Tsin-De-Shan	New People
Yekaterina Radionova	New People
~~Leonid Slutsky~~	Liberal Democratic Party
Stanislav Karpov	Liberal Democratic Party
~~Mark Shekhovtsev~~	Liberal Democratic Party
~~Yury Golubovsky~~	Liberal Democratic Party
~~Stanislav Solomin~~	Liberal Democratic Party
~~Anastasia Kharlova~~	Liberal Democratic Party
~~Yaroslav Rudnichenko~~	Liberal Democratic Party
Leonid Terekhov	Liberal Democratic Party
Marina Kolykhayeva	A Just Russia
Tatyana Slavkina	A Just Russia

== See also ==
- 2026 Russian regional elections
