= Athletics at the 1999 Pan American Games – Men's triple jump =

Men's triple jump at the Pan American Games

The men's triple jump event at the 1999 Pan American Games was held on July 30.

== Results ==
| Rank | Name | Nationality | #1 | #2 | #3 | #4 | #5 | #6 | Result | Notes |
|---|---|---|---|---|---|---|---|---|---|---|
| 1st place, gold medalist(s) | Yoelbi Quesada | Cuba | 17.05 | 17.07 | 17.14 | 17.19 | 17.17 | x | 17.19 | |
| 2nd place, silver medalist(s) | LaMark Carter | United States | 16.93 | 16.84 | x | 16.86 | 17.09 | x | 17.09 | |
| 3rd place, bronze medalist(s) | Michael Calvo | Cuba | 16.91 | 16.75 | 16.52 | 16.38 | 17.03 | x | 17.03 | |
| 4 | Brian Wellman | Bermuda | x | 14.16 | 16.32 | 16.04 | x | x | 16.32 | |
| 5 | Desmond Hunt | United States | x | 16.00 | 15.90 | x | x | 15.93 | 16.00 | |
| 6 | Leevan Sands | Bahamas | x | 15.45 | x | 15.51 | 15.29 | 15.03 | 15.51 | |
| 7 | Lloyd Browne | Saint Kitts and Nevis | 15.43 | 14.89 | 14.83 | 14.84 | 14.91 | 14.82 | 15.43 | |
| 8 | Dane Magloire | Saint Lucia | 15.27 | 15.12 | x | – | 14.94 | – | 15.27 | |
| 9 | Sheldon Hutchinson | Jamaica | 13.94 | 14.77 | 15.11 | | | | 15.11 | |
| | Richard Duncan | Canada | | | | | | | DNS | |
