= Ndabazinhle Mdhlongwa =

Zimbabwean triple jumper

Personal information
- Born: May 30, 1973 (age 53)

Sport
- Sport: Track and field
Medal record
Representing Zimbabwe
African Championships
| Silver medal – second place | 1998 Dakar | Triple jump |
African Games
| Bronze medal – third place | 1995 Harare | Triple jump |

Ndabazinhle Mdhlongwa (born May 30, 1973) is a retired Zimbabwean triple jumper. He was the African record holder with 17.34 metres from 1998 to 2007.

As a collegiate athlete for the Louisiana Ragin' Cajuns, he won the 1995 NCAA Division I Outdoor Track and Field Championships in the triple jump.

He won bronze medals at the 1992 World Junior Championships and the 1995 All-Africa Games as well as a silver medal at the 1998 African Championships. Mdhlongwa competed at the Olympic Games in 1992 (both long jump and triple jump) and 1996, the World Championships in 1995 and 1997 as well as the 1997 IAAF World Indoor Championships without reaching the final round.

== Achievements ==
| Year | Competition | Venue | Position | Event | Notes |
Representing Zimbabwe
| 1992 | Olympic Games | Barcelona, Spain | 43rd (q) | Long jump | 6.96 m |
| 1992 | Olympic Games | Barcelona, Spain | 31st (q) | Triple jump | 15.96 m |
| 1992 | World Junior Championships | Seoul, South Korea | 26th (q) | Long jump | 7.06 m (wind: -0.6 m/s) |
| 1992 | World Junior Championships | Seoul, South Korea | 3rd | Triple jump | 16.57 m (wind: +0.9 m/s) |
| 1993 | Universiade | Buffalo, United States | 28th (q) | Long jump | 6.78 m |
| 1993 | Universiade | Buffalo, United States | 16th (q) | Triple jump | 15.30 m |
| 1994 | Commonwealth Games | Victoria, British Columbia, Canada | 7th | Triple jump | 16.02 m |
| 1995 | World Championships | Gothenburg, Sweden | 16th (q) | Triple jump | 16.53 m |
| 1995 | All-Africa Games | Harare, Zimbabwe | 3rd | Triple jump | 16.60 m |
| 1996 | Olympic Games | Atlanta, United States | 42nd (q) | Triple jump | 14.47 m |
| 1997 | World Indoor Championships | Paris, France | 7th (q) | Triple jump | 16.82 m |
| 1997 | World Championships | Athens, Greece | 20th (q) | Triple jump | 16.56 m |
| 1998 | African Championships | Dakar, Senegal | 2nd | Triple jump | 17.19 m |
| 1998 | Commonwealth Games | Kuala Lumpur, Malaysia | 5th | Triple jump | 16.51 m |
| 1999 | All-Africa Games | Johannesburg, South Africa | 4th | Triple jump | 16.30 m |
