= Julian Golley =

British triple jumper (born 1971)

Personal information
- Nationality: British (English)
- Born: 12 September 1971 (age 55) Hammersmith, Greater London, England
- Height: 186 cm (6 ft 1 in)
- Weight: 80 kg (176 lb)

Sport
- Sport: Athletics
- Event: Triple jump
- Club: Thames Valley Harriers
Medal record
Athletics
Representing England
Commonwealth Games
Gold medal – first place	1994 Victoria	triple jump
Representing Great Britain
Summer Universiade
Bronze medal – third place	1993 Buffalo	Triple jump
European Athletics U23 Cup
Gold medal – first place	1992 Gateshead	Triple jump

Julian Quintin Patrick Golley (born 12 September 1971) is a male British retired triple jumper who competed at the 1992 Summer Olympics.

== Biography ==
Golley represented England and won the gold medal at the 1994 Commonwealth Games in Victoria, British Columbia, Canada, with a jump of 17.03 m. Four years later he represented England again, at the 1998 Commonwealth Games in Kuala Lumpur, Malaysia.

He also competed in the 1992 Summer Olympics in Barcelona, Spain and at the 1999 World Championships in Athletics.

Golley became the British triple jump champion after winning the British AAA Championships title at the 1992 AAA Championships.

== International competitions ==
Year	Competition	Venue	Position	Event	Notes
Representing Great Britain and England
1990	World Junior Championships	Plovdiv, Bulgaria	11th	Triple jump	15.57 m
1992	Olympic Games	Barcelona, Spain	26th (q)	Triple jump	16.18 m
1993	World Indoor Championships	Toronto, Canada	14th (q)	Triple jump	16.30 m
1993	Universiade	Buffalo, United States	3rd	Triple jump	16.88 m (w)
1994	European Indoor Championships	Paris, France	14th	Triple jump	16.17 m
1994	European Championships	Helsinki, Finland	9th	Triple jump	16.35 m
1994	Commonwealth Games	Victoria, Canada	1st	Triple jump	17.03 m
1995	Universiade	Fukuoka, Japan	11th	Triple jump	15.89 m (w)
1998	European Indoor Championships	Valencia, Spain	16th (q)	Triple jump	16.19 m
1998	European Championships	Budapest, Hungary	17th (q)	Triple jump	16.32 m
1998	Commonwealth Games	Kuala Lumpur, Malaysia	4th	Triple jump	16.83 m
1999	World Championships	Seville, Spain	14th (q)	Triple jump	16.68 m
2000	European Indoor Championships	Ghent, Belgium	8th	Triple jump	16.16 m
