= Yoelbi Quesada =

Cuban triple jumper (born 1973)

Personal information
- Full name: Yoelbi Luis Quesada Fernández
- Born: August 4, 1973 (age 53) Trinidad, Sancti Spíritus
- Height: 1.81 m (5 ft 11 in)
- Weight: 83 kg (183 lb)

Sport
- Country: Cuba
- Sport: Athletics
Medal record
Men's Athletics
Representing Cuba
Olympic Games
Bronze medal – third place	1996 Atlanta	Triple jump
World Championships
Gold medal – first place	1997 Athens	Triple jump
World Indoor Championships
Silver medal – second place	1995 Barcelona	Triple jump
Bronze medal – third place	2003 Birmingham	Triple jump
Pan American Games
Gold medal – first place	1991 Havana	Triple jump
Gold medal – first place	1995 Mar del Plata	Triple jump
Gold medal – first place	1999 Winnipeg	Triple jump
Bronze medal – third place	2003 Santo Domingo	Triple jump
Summer Universiade
Gold medal – first place	1997 Catania	Triple jump
Gold medal – first place	1999 Palma de Mallorca	Triple jump
World Junior Championships
Gold medal – first place	1992 Seoul	Triple Jump
Silver medal – second place	1990 Plovdiv	Triple Jump
CAC Junior Championships (U20)
Gold medal – first place	1990 Havana	Triple jump
- Updated on 30 May 2013

Yoelbi Luis Quesada Fernández (Spanish pronunciation: [ʝoˈelβi keˈsaða]; born August 4, 1973, in Trinidad, Sancti Spíritus) is a Cuban athlete competing mostly in triple jump.

== Career ==
He has an Olympic bronze medal, and became world champion in 1997 with a personal best jump of 17.85m.

== Personal best ==
- Triple jump: 17.85 m (wind: +0.9 m/s) – (Greece) Athens, 8 August 1997

== Competition record ==
Year	Competition	Venue	Position	Event	Notes
Representing Cuba
1990	Central American and Caribbean; Junior Championships (U-20)	Havana, Cuba	1st	Triple jump	16.68 m (+1.2 m/s)
1990	World Junior Championships	Plovdiv, Bulgaria	2nd	Triple jump	16.62 m (+1.2 m/s)
1991	Pan American Games	Havana, Cuba	1st	Triple jump	17.06 m
1991	World Championships	Tokyo, Japan	7th	Triple jump	16.94 m (-0.4 m/s)
1992	World Junior Championships	Seoul, South Korea	1st	Triple jump	17.04 m (+0.4 m/s)
1992	Ibero-American Championships	Seville, Spain	1st	Triple jump	16.93 m w (+2.2 m/s)
1992	Olympic Games	Barcelona, Spain	6th	Triple jump	17.18 m (+1.9 m/s)
1993	World Indoor Championships	Toronto, Canada	5th	Triple jump	17.06 m
1993	World Championships	Stuttgart, Germany	12th	Triple jump	16.77 m (-0.1 m/s)
1993	Central American and Caribbean Games	Ponce, Puerto Rico	1st	Triple jump	17.06 m
1995	World Indoor Championships	Barcelona, Spain	2nd	Triple jump	17.62 m
1995	Pan American Games	Mar del Plata, Argentina	1st	Triple jump	17.67 m (+1.4 m/s)
1995	World Championships	Gothenburg, Sweden	4th	Triple jump	17.59 m w (+2.6 m/s)
1996	Olympic Games	Atlanta, United States	3rd	Triple jump	17.44 m (+0.2 m/s)
1997	World Championships	Athens, Greece	1st	Triple jump	17.85 m (+0.9 m/s)
1997	Universiade	Catania, Italy	1st	Triple jump	17.35 m (-0.3 m/s)
1998	Central American and Caribbean Games	Maracaibo, Venezuela	1st	Triple jump	17.18 m (+0.7 m/s)
1999	World Indoor Championships	Maebashi, Japan	4th	Triple jump	16.92 m
1999	Universiade	Palma de Mallorca, Spain	1st	Triple jump	17.40 m (+0.1 m/s)
1999	Pan American Games	Winnipeg, Canada	1st	Triple jump	17.19 m (+0.6 m/s)
1999	World Championships	Seville, Spain	10th	Triple jump	16.88 m (+0.4 m/s)
2000	Olympic Games	Sydney, Australia	4th	Triple jump	17.37 m SB (+0.3 m/s)
2003	World Indoor Championships	Birmingham, United Kingdom	3rd	Triple jump	17.27 m
2003	Pan American Games	Santo Domingo, Dom. Rep.	3rd	Triple jump	16.78 m (-0.4 m/s)
2003	World Championships	Saint-Denis, France	9th	Triple jump	16.84 m (-0.1 m/s)
2004	Ibero-American Championships	Huelva, Spain	2nd	Triple jump	17.13 m (+0.5 m/s)
2004	Olympic Games	Athens, Greece	8th	Triple jump	16.96 m (+0.9 m/s)
2007	ALBA Games	Caracas, Venezuela	2nd	Triple jump	16.87 m (+0.0 m/s)

Records
Preceded by (Soviet Union) Sergey Bykov	World Junior Championship record holder – Men's triple jump 19 September 1992 – 27 July 2014	Succeeded by (Cuba) Lázaro Martínez
Sporting positions
Preceded by (Soviet Union) Sergey Bykov	World Junior Champion – Men's triple jump 19 September 1992 – July 1994	Succeeded by (United Kingdom) Onochie Achike
