= Mohamed Karim Sassi =

Tunisian triple jumper

Mohamed Karim Sassi (born 12 December 1968) is a Tunisian triple jumper.

He represented the club AC Nabeul. He won the silver medals at the 1990 Maghreb Championships and the 1995 All-Africa Games, and competed at the 1995 World Championships and the 1996 Olympic Games without reaching the final. He became Tunisian champion in 1988, 1989, 1991, 1993, 1995 and 1996.

His personal best jump was 16.76 metres, achieved in August 1995 in Limoges.

== Achievements ==
Year	Competition	Venue	Position	Event	Notes
Representing Tunisia
1996	Olympic Games	Atlanta, United States	43rd	Triple jump	14.25 m
