= 1999 IAAF World Indoor Championships – Men's triple jump =

The men's triple jump event at the 1999 IAAF World Indoor Championships was held on March 5.

== Results ==
Rank	Athlete	Nationality	#1	#2	#3	#4	#5	#6	Result	Notes
1st place, gold medalist(s)	Charles Friedek	Germany	17.18	13.52	16.32	x	x	17.09	17.18	PB
2nd place, silver medalist(s)	LaMark Carter	United States	16.73	x	16.90	16.89	16.98	16.31	16.98	SB
3rd place, bronze medalist(s)	Zsolt Czingler	Hungary	15.46	16.50	16.71	16.83	16.78	16.98	16.98	
4	Yoelbi Quesada	Cuba	x	16.91	16.76	x	16.63	16.92	16.92	
5	Ionut Punga	Romania	16.83	x	16.54	x	16.42	16.87	16.87	
6	Armen Martirosyan	Armenia	16.15	16.56	16.72	16.65	16.83	16.66	16.83	
7	Rogel Nachum	Israel	15.77	16.24	16.01	x	15.72	x	16.24	
8	Takanori Sugibayashi	Japan	15.97	x	x				15.97	
	Rostislav Dimitrov	Bulgaria							DSQ	^{1}
	Paolo Camossi	Italy							DNS	

^{1} Dimitrov originally won the silver medal, but was disqualified for doping.
