= Athletics at the 1998 Commonwealth Games – Men's triple jump =

Men's triple jump at the Commonwealth Games

The men's triple jump event at the 1998 Commonwealth Games was held on 18 September in Kuala Lumpur.

== Results ==
Rank	Name	Nationality	#1	#2	#3	#4	#5	#6	Result	Notes
1st place, gold medalist(s)	Onochie Achike	England	16.90	x	x	17.10	x	x	17.10	GR
2nd place, silver medalist(s)	Andrew Owusu	Ghana	16.6	16.8	x	x	16.5	17.03	17.03	
3rd place, bronze medalist(s)	Remmy Limo	Kenya	16.6	16.89	16.6	x	16.6	16.74	16.89	
4	Julian Golley	England	16.6	16.83					16.83	
5	Ndabazinhle Mdhlongwa	Zimbabwe							16.51	
6	Gable Garenamotse	Botswana							16.05	
7	Oluwafemi Akinsanya	England							16.02	
8	Mohd Zaki Sadri	Malaysia							15.94	
9	Paul Nioze	Seychelles							15.83	
10	Dwane Magloire	Saint Lucia							15.27	
11	Chai Song Lip	Malaysia							14.86	
