= 1990 World Junior Championships in Athletics – Men's triple jump =

The men's triple jump event at the 1990 World Junior Championships in Athletics was held in Plovdiv, Bulgaria, at Deveti Septemvri Stadium on 11 and 12 August.

== Medalists ==
Gold	Sergey Bykov; Soviet Union
Silver	Yoelbi Quesada; Cuba
Bronze	Nikolay Raev; Bulgaria

== Results ==
=== Final ===
12 August

Rank	Name	Nationality	Attempts						Result	Notes
Rank	Name	Nationality	1	2	3	4	5	6	Result	Notes
1st place, gold medalist(s)	Sergey Bykov	Soviet Union	16.56 (w: +0.3 m/s)	16.43 (w: -0.3 m/s)	16.79 (w: +1.4 m/s)	16.98 (w: -0.2 m/s)	16.07 (w: -0.4 m/s)	16.63 (w: -1.2 m/s)	16.98 (w: -0.2 m/s)	
2nd place, silver medalist(s)	Yoelbi Quesada	Cuba	16.62 (w: +1.2 m/s)	16.30 (w: +0.6 m/s)	15.91 (w: -1.1 m/s)	16.25 (w: -0.6 m/s)	16.32 (w: -1.2 m/s)	16.48 (w: +0.4 m/s)	16.62 (w: +1.2 m/s)	
3rd place, bronze medalist(s)	Nikolay Raev	Bulgaria	15.04 (w: +0.3 m/s)	15.65 w (w: +2.6 m/s)	15.84 (w: -0.9 m/s)	16.22 (w: +0.9 m/s)	16.14 (w: -1.7 m/s)	15.96 (w: +0.5 m/s)	16.22 (w: +0.9 m/s)	
4	Tosi Fasinro	United Kingdom	15.56 (w: -1.4 m/s)	15.66 (w: +0.5 m/s)	16.06 (w: -0.2 m/s)	16.09 (w: +1.7 m/s)	16.17 (w: +1.3 m/s)	15.76 (w: +0.3 m/s)	16.17 (w: +1.3 m/s)	
5	Sergey Arzamasov	Soviet Union	16.14 (w: +1.3 m/s)	-	x	16.12 (w: -0.4 m/s)	16.15 (w: +0.1 m/s)	-	16.15 (w: +0.1 m/s)	
6	Rene Baarck	East Germany	x	15.86 (w: -1.7 m/s)	x	16.06 (w: -0.7 m/s)	15.66 (w: -0.6 m/s)	15.80 (w: +1.6 m/s)	16.06 (w: -0.7 m/s)	
7	Jairo Venâncio	Brazil	x	15.66 (w: +0.7 m/s)	15.92 (w: +0.6 m/s)	15.54 (w: -0.6 m/s)	13.70 (w: +0.8 m/s)	15.91 (w: +0.3 m/s)	15.92 (w: +0.6 m/s)	
8	Paweł Twardowski	Poland	15.53 (w: +0.1 m/s)	15.71 (w: -1.4 m/s)	15.68 (w: +1.6 m/s)	x	x	x	15.71 (w: -1.4 m/s)	
9	Georgi Dimitrov	Bulgaria	x	15.64 (w: -0.4 m/s)	15.49 (w: -0.1 m/s)				15.64 (w: -0.4 m/s)	
10	Zsolt Czingler	Hungary	15.61 (w: -1.0 m/s)	x	15.30 (w: +0.7 m/s)				15.61 (w: -1.0 m/s)	
11	Julian Golley	United Kingdom	15.21 (w: -2.3 m/s)	15.57 (w: -2.0 m/s)	15.28 (w: -0.7 m/s)				15.57 (w: -2.0 m/s)	
12	Charles Friedek	West Germany	x	15.48 (w: +1.4 m/s)	15.53 (w: -0.9 m/s)				15.53 (w: -0.9 m/s)	
13	Hristos Melétoglou	Greece	15.09 (w: -2.5 m/s)	15.45 w (w: +2.2 m/s)	x				15.45 w (w: +2.2 m/s)	
14	David Walter	Cuba	15.23 (w: +0.7 m/s)	-	-				15.23 (w: +0.7 m/s)	
15	Erick Walder	United States	x	14.86 (w: +0.6 m/s)	15.00 (w: -0.8 m/s)				15.00 (w: -0.8 m/s)	
16	Tibor Ordina	Hungary	14.93 (w: -0.3 m/s)	x	x				14.93 (w: -0.3 m/s)	

=== Qualifications ===
11 Aug

==== Group A ====
Rank	Name	Nationality	Attempts			Result	Notes
Rank	Name	Nationality	1	2	3	Result	Notes
1	Rene Baarck	East Germany	16.32 (w: +0.5 m/s)	-	-	16.32 (w: +0.5 m/s)	Q
2	Yoelbi Quesada	Cuba	16.18 (w: +0.6 m/s)	-	-	16.18 (w: +0.6 m/s)	Q
3	Sergey Bykov	Soviet Union	15.82 (w: -0.1 m/s)	-	-	15.82 (w: -0.1 m/s)	Q
4	Tosi Fasinro	United Kingdom	x	15.29 (w: +0.7 m/s)	15.81 (w: +1.3 m/s)	15.81 (w: +1.3 m/s)	Q
5	Paweł Twardowski	Poland	15.42 (w: -0.3 m/s)	15.51 (w: -1.8 m/s)	15.80 (w: +0.6 m/s)	15.80 (w: +0.6 m/s)	Q
6	Nikolay Raev	Bulgaria	15.75 (w: -0.3 m/s)	-	-	15.75 (w: -0.3 m/s)	Q
7	Tibor Ordina	Hungary	15.09 (w: -0.2 m/s)	15.64 (w: +0.2 m/s)	-	15.64 (w: +0.2 m/s)	Q
8	Jeferson Ilario	Brazil	x	x	15.55 (w: -0.1 m/s)	15.55 (w: -0.1 m/s)	
9	Mohamed Kamel	Egypt	15.42 (w: -0.1 m/s)	x	15.28 (w: +0.8 m/s)	15.42 (w: -0.1 m/s)	
10	Bryan Delsite	United States	14.77 (w: -0.2 m/s)	14.85 (w: -0.3 m/s)	15.31 (w: +0.2 m/s)	15.31 (w: +0.2 m/s)	
11	Hitoshi Shimo	Japan	x	15.30 (w: -0.6 m/s)	x	15.30 (w: -0.6 m/s)	
12	Eugene Venter	Namibia	15.17 (w: +0.4 m/s)	14.92 (w: +1.5 m/s)	14.82 (w: +1.7 m/s)	15.17 (w: +0.4 m/s)	
13	Gordon Mulenga	Zambia	14.76 (w: +0.1 m/s)	15.04 (w: +0.2 m/s)	14.76 (w: +1.4 m/s)	15.04 (w: +0.2 m/s)	
14	Zhang Jun	China	14.60 (w: +0.3 m/s)	14.57 (w: -0.5 m/s)	14.97 (w: +0.2 m/s)	14.97 (w: +0.2 m/s)	
15	Xavier Valls	Spain	x	14.83 (w: +0.3 m/s)	14.96 (w: +0.4 m/s)	14.96 (w: +0.4 m/s)	
16	Sean Casey	Australia	14.84 (w: +0.6 m/s)	x	x	14.84 (w: +0.6 m/s)	
17	Xavier Montané	Andorra	x	14.36 (w: +0.3 m/s)	x	14.36 (w: +0.3 m/s)	

==== Group B ====
Rank	Name	Nationality	Attempts			Result	Notes
Rank	Name	Nationality	1	2	3	Result	Notes
1	Erick Walder	United States	14.79 (w: -1.1 m/s)	15.42 (w: -0.5 m/s)	16.12 (w: +1.3 m/s)	16.12 (w: +1.3 m/s)	Q
2	Georgi Dimitrov	Bulgaria	16.05 (w: +1.9 m/s)	-	-	16.05 (w: +1.9 m/s)	Q
3	Jairo Venâncio	Brazil	x	16.02 (w: +0.8 m/s)	-	16.02 (w: +0.8 m/s)	Q
4	David Walter	Cuba	15.18 (w: +0.9 m/s)	16.01 (w: +1.6 m/s)	-	16.01 (w: +1.6 m/s)	Q
5	Charles Friedek	West Germany	15.21 (w: -0.7 m/s)	x	15.99 (w: +1.0 m/s)	15.99 (w: +1.0 m/s)	Q
6	Sergey Arzamasov	Soviet Union	x	15.86 w (w: +2.4 m/s)	-	15.86 w (w: +2.4 m/s)	Q
7	Zsolt Czingler	Hungary	x	15.79 (w: +0.4 m/s)	-	15.79 (w: +0.4 m/s)	Q
8	Hristos Melétoglou	Greece	15.38 (w: +1.6 m/s)	15.39 (w: +0.8 m/s)	15.63 (w: +0.7 m/s)	15.63 (w: +0.7 m/s)	Q
9	Julian Golley	United Kingdom	15.14 (w: -1.2 m/s)	14.85 (w: -2.4 m/s)	15.61 (w: +1.0 m/s)	15.61 (w: +1.0 m/s)	Q
10	Noriyuki Matsui	Japan	14.87 (w: -0.4 m/s)	x	15.56 (w: +1.0 m/s)	15.56 (w: +1.0 m/s)	
11	Guido Kriegelstein	East Germany	x	x	15.48 (w: +1.4 m/s)	15.48 (w: +1.4 m/s)	
12	Tony Brideson	Australia	x	15.45 (w: -0.3 m/s)	15.45 (w: +0.7 m/s)	15.45 (w: -0.3 m/s)	
13	Ionel Eftimie	Romania	14.69 (w: -0.7 m/s)	15.41 (w: +0.5 m/s)	15.35 (w: +0.6 m/s)	15.41 (w: +0.5 m/s)	
14	Stefano Rizzieri	Italy	15.15 (w: -0.2 m/s)	15.37 (w: -0.3 m/s)	15.21 (w: +0.3 m/s)	15.37 (w: -0.3 m/s)	
15	Oscar Valiente	Peru	15.34 (w: +0.5 m/s)	14.25 (w: -1.2 m/s)	13.93 (w: -0.7 m/s)	15.34 (w: +0.5 m/s)	
16	Josep María Torras	Spain	15.03 (w: +0.2 m/s)	14.65 (w: -1.5 m/s)	14.73 (w: -0.7 m/s)	15.03 (w: +0.2 m/s)	
	Miloš Krampl	Yugoslavia	x	x	x	NM	

== Participation ==
According to an unofficial count, 34 athletes from 23 countries participated in the event.

- Andorra (1)
- Australia (2)
- Brazil (2)
- Bulgaria (2)
- China (1)
- Cuba (2)
- East Germany (2)
- Egypt (1)
- Greece (1)
- Hungary (2)
- Italy (1)
- Japan (2)
- Namibia (1)
- Peru (1)
- Poland (1)
- Romania (1)
- Soviet Union (2)
- Spain (2)
- United Kingdom (2)
- United States (2)
- West Germany (1)
- Yugoslavia (1)
- Zambia (1)
