= Faith Idehen =

Nigerian sprinter (born 1973)

Personal information
- Born: 5 February 1973 (age 53)
Medal record
Women's athletics
Representing Nigeria}
Olympic Games
Bronze medal – third place	1992 Barcelona	4x100 m relay
Commonwealth Games
Gold medal – first place	1994 Victoria	4x100 m relay
African Championships
Gold medal – first place	1993 Durban	4×100 m relay
Summer Universiade
Silver medal – second place	1993 Buffalo	4x100 m relay

Faith Idehen (born 5 February 1973) is a Nigerian former sprinter. At the 1992 Summer Olympics she, together with Beatrice Utondu, Christy Opara Thompson and Mary Onyali, won a bronze medal in 4 x 100 metres relay.

Idehen attended the University of Alabama on a track scholarship. She is married to fellow track athlete Festus Igbinoghene and they have a son, Noah Igbinoghene, who is a National Football League player.

== Achievements ==
Year	Competition	Venue	Position	Event	Notes
Representing Nigeria
1992	Olympic Games	Barcelona, Spain	3rd	4 × 100 m relay	42.81 s
1994	Commonwealth Games	Victoria, Canada	1st	4 × 100 m relay	42.99 s
