= Viktor Sotnikov (athlete) =

Russian triple jumper (born 1974)

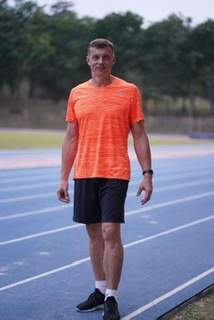

Viktor Sotnikov (Russian: Виктор Сотников; born 17 July 1974) is a Russian triple jumper. He finished ninth at the 1996 Olympic Games.

== Achievements ==
| Year | Competition | Venue | Position | Event | Notes |
Representing Russia
| 1996 | Olympic Games | Atlanta, United States | 9th | Triple jump | 16.84 m |
