= LaMark Carter =

American triple jumper (born 1970)

Personal information
- Born: August 23, 1970 (age 55) Shreveport, Louisiana, United States

Sport
- Sport: Track and field
Medal record
Representing United States
World Indoor Championships
Silver medal – second place	1999 Maebashi	Triple jump
Summer Universiade
Bronze medal – third place	1995 Fukuoka	Triple jump
Pan American Games
Silver medal – second place	1999 Winnipeg	Triple jump

LaMark Carter (born August 23, 1970) is an American former triple jumper. His personal best was 17.44 m (57 ft 2 1/2 in), achieved in June 1998 in New Orleans. He was the silver medallist at the 1999 IAAF World Indoor Championships and also the 1999 Pan American Games. He was a three-time national champion at the USA Outdoor Track and Field Championships (1998, 1999 and 2001).

He made the USA Olympic Team in 2000 but did not medal in the Sydney Games. At the US 2004 Olympic Team Trials he tested positive for the banned substance salbutamol. Carter was a three-time participant at the World Championships in Athletics.

He attended Captain Shreve High School and collegiately he competed for the Northwestern State Demons and Lady Demons. He holds the triple jump meet record for the New Balance Indoor Grand Prix, having jumped 16.93 m (55 ft 6 1/2 in) in 1998.

== National titles ==
- USA Outdoor Track and Field Championships
  - Triple jump: 1998, 1999, 2001

== International competitions ==
Year	Competition	Venue	Position	Notes
1995	World Indoor Championships	Barcelona, Spain	6th	16.80 m
1995	Universiade	Fukuoka, Japan	3rd	16.62 m
1995	Pan American Games	Mar del Plata, Argentina	4th	
1995	World Championships	Gothenburg, Sweden	11th (q)	16.51 m
1997	World Indoor Championships	Paris, France	8th (q)	16.67 m
1998	Goodwill Games	Uniondale, United States	3rd	17.07 m
1998	IAAF Grand Prix Final	Moscow, Russia	5th	16.57 m
1998	World Cup	Johannesburg, South Africa	5th	17.20 m
1999	World Indoor Championships	Maebashi, Japan	2nd	16.98 m
1999	World Championships	Seville, Spain	6th	17.10 m
1999	Pan American Games	Winnipeg, Canada	2nd	17.09 m
2000	Olympic Games	Sydney, Australia	10th (q)	16.47 m
2000	IAAF Grand Prix Final	Doha, Qatar	5th	15.80 m
2001	World Championships	Edmonton, Canada	7th (q)	16.60 m
2001	Goodwill Games	Brisbane, Australia	3rd	16.83 m
2004	World Indoor Championships	Budapest, Hungary	7th (q)	16.47 m

== See also ==
- List of doping cases in athletics
