= Hussain Jasim =

Iraqi triple jumper

Personal information
- Nationality: Iraqi
- Born: 22 July 1966 (age 59)

Sport
- Sport: Athletics
- Event: Triple jump

Hussain Jasim (born 22 July 1966) is an Iraqi athlete. He competed in the men's triple jump at the 1996 Summer Olympics.
