= Paul Nioze =

Seychellois triple jumper

Personal information
- Nationality: Seychelles
- Born: 19 March 1967 (age 59) Seychelles
- Height: 1.87 m (6 ft 2 in)
- Weight: 77 kg (170 lb)

Sport
- Sport: Athletics
- Event: Triple jump
Medal record
Men's athletics
Representing Seychelles
African Championships
Gold medal – first place	1996 Yaoundé	Triple jump
Bronze medal – third place	1989 Lagos	Triple jump
Bronze medal – third place	1993 Durban	Triple jump
All-Africa Games
Silver medal – second place	1991 Cairo	Triple jump

Paul Roger Nioze (born 19 March 1967) is a Seychellois former triple jumper who competed at the 1992 and 1996 Summer Olympics, finishing in 22nd and 39th place, respectively. He is the 1996 African Champion and the national record holder. Furthermore, he was named the Seychelles Sportsman of the Year in 1996, and retired in 2000.

He is currently the manager of the World Anti-Doping Agency (WADA) Indian Ocean regional office, overseeing work in five countries in Southeastern Africa. Nioze was first appointed as a WADA independent observer in 2005, and worked the 2006 Winter Olympics in Turin.

== Competition record ==
Year	Competition	Venue	Position	Event	Notes
Representing Seychelles
1987	National Championships	Seychelles	1st	Long jump	6.83 m
1987	National Championships	Seychelles	1st	Triple jump	15.20 m
1989	Jeux de la Francophonie	Casablanca, Morocco	5th	Triple jump	16.32 m
1989	African Championships	Lagos, Nigeria	3rd	Triple jump	16.74 m
1990	Commonwealth Games	Auckland, Australia	8th	Triple jump	16.25 m
1991	World Championships	Tokyo, Japan	32nd (q)	Triple jump	15.72 m
1991	All-Africa Games	Cairo, Egypt	2nd	Triple jump	16.50 m
1991	National Championships	Seychelles	1st	Long jump	7.22 m
1991	National Championships	Seychelles	1st	Triple jump	16.05 m
1992	Summer Olympics	Barcelona, Spain	22nd (q)	Triple jump	16.23 m
1993	African Championships	Durban, South Africa	3rd	Triple jump	16.11 m
1995	World Championships	Gothenburg, Sweden	29th (q)	Triple jump	15.71 m
1995	World Indoor Championships	Barcelona, Spain	21st (q)	Triple jump	15.78 m
1995	National Championships	Seychelles	1st	Triple jump	16.36 m
1996	Summer Olympics	Atlanta, United States	39th (q)	Triple jump	15.63 m
1996	African Championships	Yaoundé, Cameroon	1st	Triple jump	16.52 m
1997	World Championships	Athens, Greece	35th (q)	Triple jump	15.79 m
1997	African Southern Region Championships	Durban, South Africa	1st	Triple jump	16.37 m
1997	National Championships	Seychelles	1st	Triple jump	16.36 m
1997	Jeux de la Francophonie	Antananarivo, Madagascar	4th	Triple jump	16.41 m
1998	Commonwealth Games	Kuala Lumpur, Malaysia	9th	Triple jump	15.83 m
1998	National Championships	Seychelles	1st	Triple jump	15.96 m
1999	All-Africa Games	Johannesburg, South Africa	8th	Triple jump	15.37 m

== Personal bests ==
- Triple jump – 16.80 m (Antananarivo, 1990) NR

== Personal life ==
His niece, Diane Nioze, competes professionally in the 100 metres and long jump events. She won first in both events at the 2012 World Athletics Day Meet, and later competed at the 2013 Jeux de la Francophonie.

In addition to working with WADA, Nioze frequently organises youth athletics competitions in his home country, collaborating with the Seychelles Athletics Federation.
