= Vladimir Kravchenko (politician) =

Russian politician (born 1964)

- Владимир Кравченко
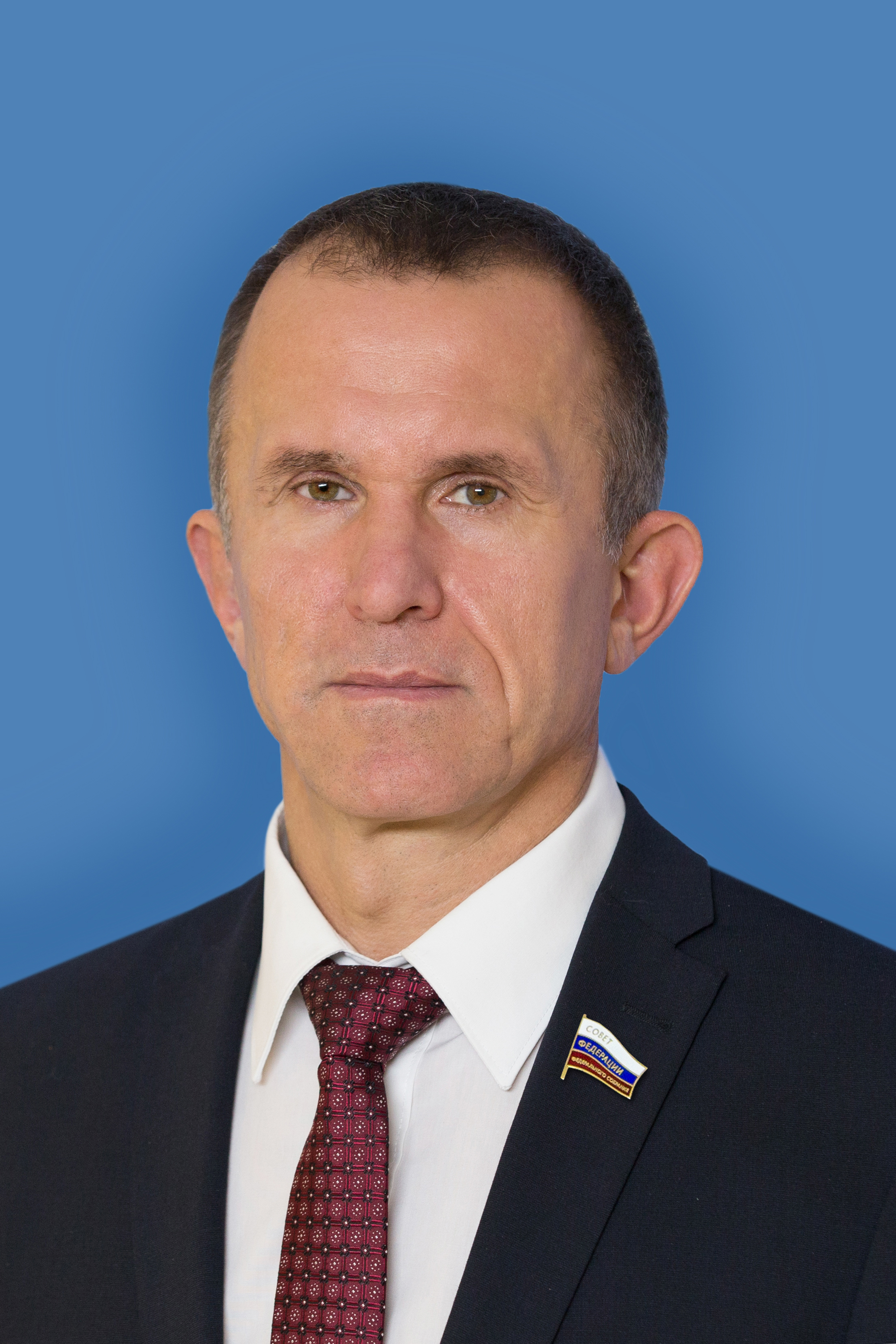

Senator from Tomsk Oblast
- Incumbent
- Assumed office 14 October 2021
- Preceded by: Igor Chernyshev

Personal details
- Born: Vladimir Kravchenko; 12 June 1964 (age 62) Tomsky District, Tomsk Oblast, Russian Soviet Socialist Republic, Soviet Union
- Party: United Russia
- Education: Tomsk State Pedagogical University, Tomsk State Pedagogical University

Vladimir Kazimirovich Kravchenko (Russian: Владимир Казимирович Кравченко; born 12 June 1964) is a Russian politician serving as a senator from Tomsk Oblast since 14 October 2021.

== Biography ==
Vladimir Kravchenko was born on 12 June 1964. In 1985, he graduated from the Tomsk State Pedagogical University. In 2002, he also received a degree from Tomsk State Pedagogical University. Right after the first degree, Kravchenko started working as a physical education teacher in Tomsk Oblast. Later, he also served in the Soviet Army. From 1989 to 1996, he was the primary organizer of the Tomsk military-patriotic club. Afterward, Kravchenko also chaired the Russian Union of Veterans of Afghanistan.

In 2000, he participated in the creation of the Tomsk regional branch of the Unity party. For more than ten years, he also headed the local branch of the United Russia party. From 2007 to 2016, he was the deputy of the Legislative Duma of Tomsk Oblast of the 4th, 5th, and 6th convocations. On 7 October 2016, he became the senator from the Legislative Duma of Tomsk Oblast. In 2021, he was re-elected for the same position.

=== Sanctions ===
Vladimir Kravchenko is under personal sanction introduced by the European Union, the United Kingdom, the USA, Canada, Switzerland, Australia, Ukraine, New Zealand, for ratifying the decisions of the "Treaty of Friendship, Cooperation and Mutual Assistance between the Russian Federation and the Donetsk People's Republic and between the Russian Federation and the Luhansk People's Republic" and providing political and economic support for Russia's annexation of Ukrainian territories.
