= Noah Igbinoghene =

American football player (born 1999)

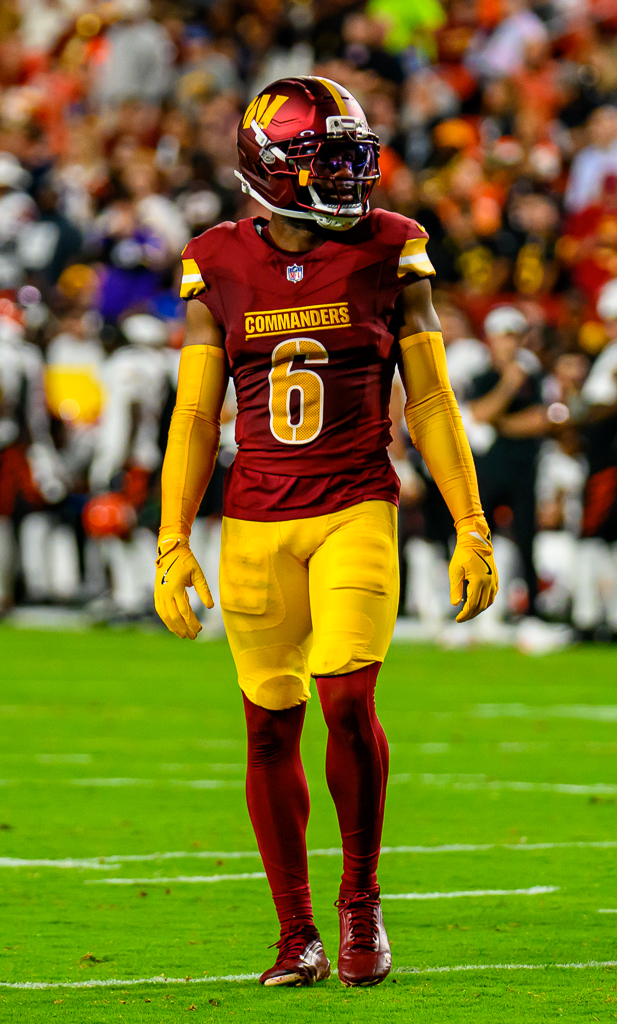
- Igbinoghene with the Washington Commanders in 2025

No. 20 – Cleveland Browns
- Position: Cornerback
- Roster status: Active

Personal information
- Born: November 27, 1999 (age 26); Trussville, Alabama, U.S.
- Listed height: 5 ft 11 in (1.80 m)
- Listed weight: 197 lb (89 kg)

Career information
- High school: Hewitt-Trussville
- College: Auburn (2017–2019)
- NFL draft: 2020: 1st round, 30th overall pick

Career history
- Miami Dolphins (2020–2022); Dallas Cowboys (2023); Washington Commanders (2024–2025); Seattle Seahawks (2026)*; Cleveland Browns (2026–present)
- * Offseason or practice squad member only

Career NFL statistics as of Week 3, 2026
- Total tackles: 121
- Sacks: 1.0
- Fumble recoveries: 2
- Pass deflections: 17
- Interceptions: 1
- Touchdowns: 1
- Stats at Pro Football Reference

Noah Igbinoghene (/ɪɡbɛˈnɔːɡɪniː/ igg-beh-NAWG-ih-nee; born November 27, 1999) is an American professional football cornerback for the Cleveland Browns of the National Football League (NFL). He played college football for the Auburn Tigers and was selected by the Miami Dolphins in the first round of the 2020 NFL draft. Igbinoghene has also played for the Dallas Cowboys and Washington Commanders. He is the son of Olympic athletes Festus Igbinoghene and Faith Idehen.

== Early life ==
Igbinoghene was born on November 27, 1999, in Trussville, Alabama. He is of Nigerian descent, and lived in Nigeria for part of his life. Both of his parents, Festus and Faith, were Olympic athletes in track and field.

Igbinoghene attended Hewitt-Trussville High School . He played on the football team at wide receiver. As a senior, he tallied over 1,700 all-purpose yards and 18 touchdowns. He received All-USA Today Alabama and ASWA Class 7A All-state honors.

He was a multiple state champion in track and field, claiming eight Alabama High School Athletic Association titles between the long jump and triple jump.

== College career ==
Igbinoghene accepted a football scholarship from Auburn University, where he played from 2017 to 2019. As a true freshman, he was a backup wide receiver, playing mostly on special teams. He appeared in 14 games, tallying 6 receptions for 24 yards and 24 kickoff returns for 571 yards (23.8-yard avg.).

As a sophomore, he was converted into a cornerback during the spring. He became a starter that season, registering 50 tackles and 11 pass breakups. He made 5 tackles and 2 pass breakups in the season opener against the University of Washington. He had a 96-yard kickoff return for touchdown and forced a fumble against the University of Arkansas. He made 7 tackles against the University of Alabama. He had 5 tackles against Purdue University in the 2018 Music City Bowl.

As a junior, he posted 42 tackles and 7 pass breakups. He made 8 tackles against Texas A&M University. He had 6 tackles against Louisiana State University. He made 5 tackles against the University of Alabama. He set a school bowl record with a 96-yard kickoff return for touchdown in the 2020 Outback Bowl. He declared for the NFL draft after the season. He finished his career with 92 tackles, one interception and 2 kickoff returns for touchdowns.

He also practiced track and field, competing in the long jump and triple jump. He finished fourth in the triple jump at the War Eagle Invitational in 2018.

== Professional career ==
Pre-draft measurables
Height	Weight	Arm length	Hand span	Wingspan	40-yard dash	10-yard split	20-yard split	20-yard shuttle	Three-cone drill	Vertical jump	Broad jump	Bench press
5 ft 10 3/8 in (1.79 m)	198 lb (90 kg)	31 3/4 in (0.81 m)	9 3/8 in (0.24 m)	6 ft 3 1/8 in (1.91 m)	4.48 s	1.57 s	2.63 s	4.19 s	7.10 s	40.0 in (1.02 m)	10 ft 8 in (3.25 m)	15 reps
All values from NFL Combine/Pro Day

=== Miami Dolphins ===
Igbinoghene was selected by the Miami Dolphins in the first round (30th overall) of the 2020 NFL draft. The Dolphins previously moved down from one of the first round draft selections they acquired in the trade that sent Kenny Stills and Laremy Tunsil to the Houston Texans. Entering the league as a 20-year-old rookie made Igbinoghene the youngest player in the NFL, furthermore, his offseason was limited and the preseason games were canceled because of the COVID-19 pandemic. In the second game of the season against the Buffalo Bills, starter Byron Jones left after the opening drive with a groin injury, forcing Igbinoghene to cover Stefon Diggs the rest of the game and allowing 8 receptions for 153 yards and one touchdown. He would start the next 2 contests in place of Jones, with mixed results. He appeared in all 16 games with 2 starts, finishing with 10 tackles, 2 passes defensed, 2 fumble recoveries, 3 special teams tackles and 4 kickoff returns for 68 yards (17-yard avg.).

In 2021, he struggled on the field, appearing in 7 games with one start, while making 4 defensive tackles and 2 special teams tackles . He was declared inactive in 6 contests. He also missed 2 contests on the Reserve/COVID-19 list. In Week 6, he was named the starter against the Jacksonville Jaguars and had 4 tackles.

In 2022, he appeared in 9 games with 2 starts, collecting 10 tackles, one interception, and three passes defended. He was declared inactive in 8 contests. A rash of injuries at the cornerback position, allowed him the opportunity to play in a stretch of 5 games. In Week 8, he was named the starter and secured a game-sealing interception (first in his career) in the waning seconds of a 16–10 victory against the Pittsburgh Steelers, to go along with 4 tackles and one pass defensed. He also started in Week 14 against the Buffalo Bills and had 2 tackles.

In 2023, the Dolphins declined his contract fifth-year option. He also faced increased competition during the preseason, with the signing of All-Pro Jalen Ramsey, Eli Apple and the selection of rookie second-round draft choice Cam Smith.

=== Dallas Cowboys ===
On August 29, 2023, the Dolphins traded Igbinoghene to the Dallas Cowboys in exchange for cornerback Kelvin Joseph. In his Cowboys debut, he scored the Cowboys' first touchdown of the season on a 58-yard blocked field goal return, kickstarting the Cowboys' 40–0 shutout win over the New York Giants. He appeared in 5 games as a backup cornerback and played mainly on special teams, only seeing late-game action on defense in a few contests. He was declared inactive in a total of 12 games.

=== Washington Commanders ===
Igbinoghene signed as a free agent with the Washington Commanders on March 18, 2024. He reunited with head coach Dan Quinn, who was his defensive coordinator with the Dallas Cowboys. After starting cornerback Emmanuel Forbes Jr. suffered an injury in Week 1, requiring surgery, Igbinoghene took over the starting nickelback role in place of Mike Sainristil, who moved from nickelback to cornerback to replace Forbes. Igbinoghene retained the starting nickelback position after Forbes returned from injury. He played in all 17 regular season games (with ten starts) and recorded 55 tackles and seven pass deflections.

On March 18, 2025, Igbinoghene re-signed with the Commanders on a one-year contract. He played in 15 games with two starts, recording 35 tackles, one sack, and five passes defensed.

=== Seattle Seahawks ===
On March 17, 2026, Igbinoghene signed with the Seattle Seahawks on a one-year, $1.81 million contract. On August 30, Igbinoghene was released by the Seahawks as a part of final roster cuts.

=== Cleveland Browns ===
On September 1, 2026, Igbinoghene signed with the Cleveland Browns.

== NFL career statistics ==
Legend
**Bold**	Career high

=== Regular season ===
Year	Team	Games		Tackles					Interceptions						Fumbles					Kick returns				
Year	Team	GP	GS	Cmb	Solo	Ast	Sck	TFL	Int	Yds	Avg	Lng	TD	PD	FF	Fum	FR	Yds	TD	Ret	Yds	Avg	Lng	TD
2020	MIA	16	2	13	11	2	0.0	0	0	0	0.0	0	0	2	0	0	**2**	**5**	0	4	68	17.0	22	0
2021	MIA	7	1	6	6	0	0.0	0	0	0	0.0	0	0	0	0	0	0	0	0	0	0	0.0	0	0
2022	MIA	9	2	10	8	2	0.0	0	**1**	0	0.0	0	0	3	0	0	0	0	0	0	0	0.0	0	0
2023	DAL	5	0	0	0	0	0.0	0	0	0	0.0	0	0	0	0	0	0	0	0	0	0	0.0	0	0
2024	WAS	**17**	**10**	**55**	**33**	**22**	0.0	**1**	0	0	0.0	0	0	**7**	0	0	0	0	0	1	25	25.0	25	0
2025	WAS	15	2	35	22	13	**1.0**	**1**	0	0	0.0	0	0	5	0	0	0	0	0	**7**	**191**	**27.3**	**46**	0
2026	CLE	2	0	2	2	0	0.0	0	0	0	0.0	0	0	5	0	0	0	0	0	0	0	0.0	0	0
Career		71	17	121	82	39	1.0	2	1	0	0.0	0	0	17	0	0	2	5	0	12	284	23.7	46	0

=== Postseason ===
Year	Team	Games		Tackles					Interceptions						Fumbles				
Year	Team	GP	GS	Cmb	Solo	Ast	Sck	TFL	Int	Yds	Avg	Lng	TD	PD	FF	Fum	FR	Yds	TD
2023	DAL	1	0	0	0	0	0.0	0	0	0	0.0	0	0	0	0	0	0	0	0
2024	WAS	**3**	**2**	**10**	**7**	**3**	0.0	**2**	0	0	0.0	0	0	0	0	0	0	0	0
Career		4	2	10	7	3	0.0	2	0	0	0.0	0	0	0	0	0	0	0	0
