= Armen Martirosyan (athlete) =

Armenian triple jumper

Personal information
- Born: 6 August 1969 (age 57) Guiumri, Sovietic Union

Sport
- Country: Armenia
- Sport: Track and field
- Events: Triple jump, Long Jump
Medal record
Men's Athletics
Representing Armenia
European Indoor Championships
Bronze medal – third place	1996 Sweden	Triple jump
Universiade
Silver medal – second place	1995 Fukuoka	Triple jump
- Updated on 26 September 2025

Armen Martirosyan (Armenian: Արմեն Մարտիրոսյան, born 6 August 1969 in Leninakan, Shirak, Armenian SSR) is a retired Armenian triple jumper. He came in fifth place at the 1996 Summer Olympics and also competed at the 2000 Summer Olympics and 2004 Summer Olympics in the men's triple jump. Martirosyan won a bronze medal at the 1996 European Indoor Championships in Stockholm. His personal best triple jump is 17.41 metres, achieved in June 1998 in Gyumri. His personal best triple jump indoors is 17.21 metres, achieved on 17 January 1999 in Yerevan. Both of these are the Armenian records.

== Achievements ==
Year	Competition	Venue	Position	Event	Notes
Representing Armenia
1993	World Championships	Stuttgart, Germany	26th (q)	Triple jump	16.50 m
1994	European Indoor Championships	Paris, France	28th (q)	Long jump	7.47 m
1995	World Indoor Championships	Barcelona, Spain	9th	Triple jump	16.37 m
1995	World Championships	Gothenburg, Sweden	–	Long jump	NM
1995	World Championships	Gothenburg, Sweden	13th (q)	Triple jump	16.60 m
1995	Universiade	Fukuoka, Japan	25th (q)	Long jump	7.51 m
1995	Universiade	Fukuoka, Japan	2nd	Triple jump	16.82 m
1996	European Indoor Championships	Stockholm, Sweden	3rd	Triple jump	16.74 m
1996	Olympic Games	Atlanta, United States	5th	Triple jump	16.97 m
1997	World Championships	Athens, Greece	12th	Triple jump	16.70 m
1997	Universiade	Catania, Italy	8th	Triple jump	16.59 m
1998	European Championships	Budapest, Hungary	16th (q)	Triple jump	16.33 m
1999	World Indoor Championships	Maebashi, Japan	6th	Triple jump	16.83 m
1999	World Championships	Seville, Spain	15th (q)	Triple jump	16.67 m
2000	European Indoor Championships	Ghent, Belgium	15th (q)	Triple jump	16.27 m
2000	Olympic Games	Sydney, Australia	35th (q)	Triple jump	14.95 m
2004	Olympic Games	Athens, Greece	43rd (q)	Triple jump	15.05 m

== See also ==
- Armenian records in athletics
