= Stoyko Tsonov =

Bulgarian triple jumper

Personal information
- Native name: Стойко Георгиев Цонов
- Nationality: Bulgarian
- Born: Stoyko Georgiev Tsonov; 6 May 1969 (age 57) Borets, Plovdiv Province, Bulgaria
- Family: Georgi Tsonov (son)

Sport
- Sport: Track and field
- Event: Triple jump

Achievements and titles
- Personal best: 17.02 m (1995)

Stoyko Georgiev Tsonov (Bulgarian: Стойко Георгиев Цонов, born 6 May 1969) is a retired Bulgarian triple jumper.

He was born in Boretz. He competed at the 1996 Olympic Games, but finished lowly. His personal best jump was 17.02 metres, achieved in 1995.

He has later coached triple jumpers such as Ivaylo Rusenov. His son, Georgi Tsonov, is also a triple jumper.
