= Rogel Nachum =

Israeli triple jumper

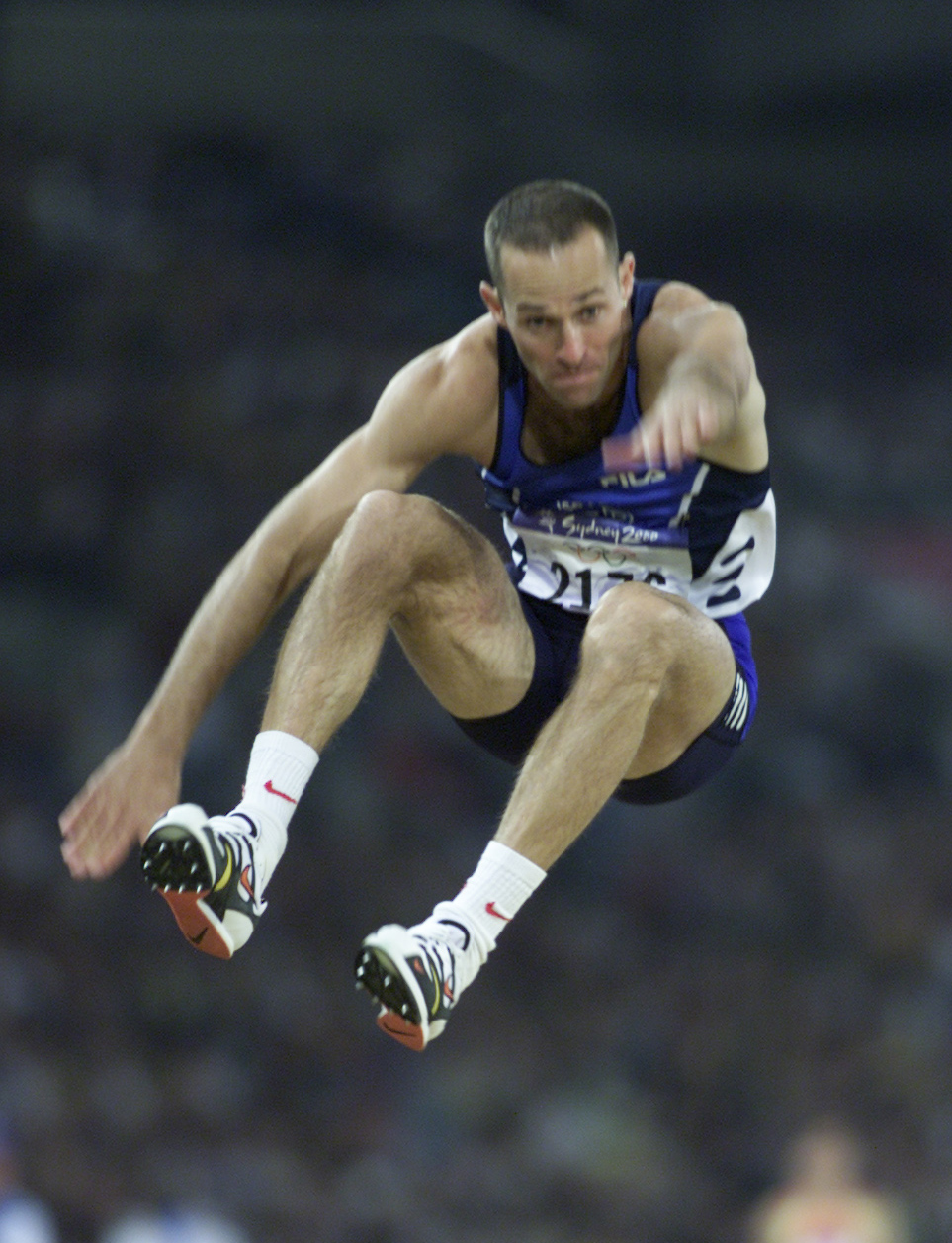
- Nachum in 2000

Personal information
- Nationality: Israel
- Born: רוגל נחום; May 21, 1967 (age 59)

Sport
- Sport: Athletics
- Event: Triple jump

Achievements and titles
- Personal bests: Triple jump: 17.20 metres (1992); Long jump: 7.96 metres; High jump: 2.18 metres

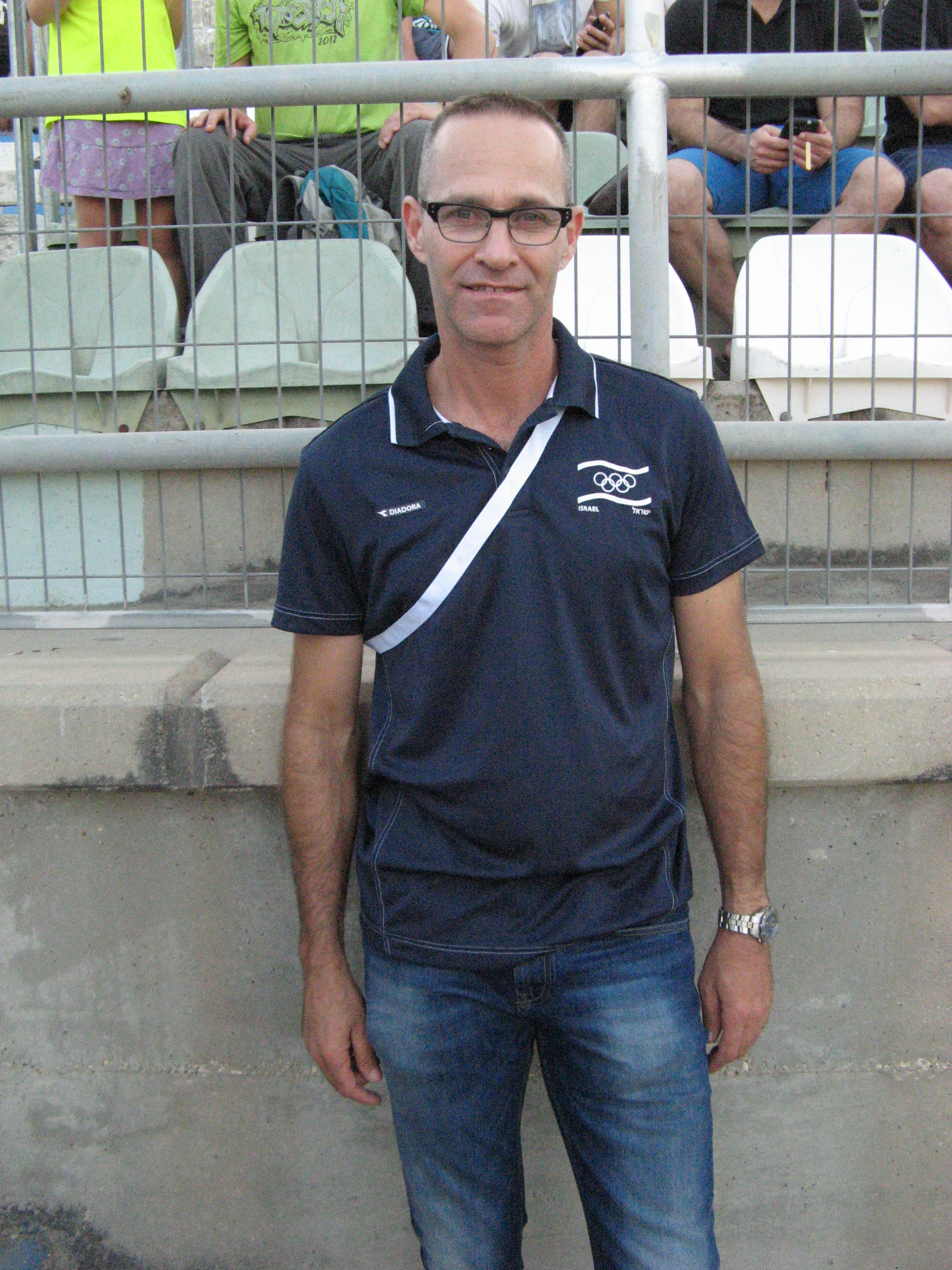
Nachum in 2015

Rogel Nachum (or Nahum, Hebrew: רוגל נחום; born 21 May 1967) is a retired Israeli triple jumper, whose personal best was 17.20 meters, achieved in June 1992 in Seville.

Nachum participated in three Olympic Games: Barcelona 1992, Atlanta 1996, Sydney 2000 where he carried the Israeli flag at opening ceremony.

At the 1989 Maccabiah Games, he won the triple jump in 55' 0 1/4", and was then recruited for Kansas State University by U.S. T&F coach Steve Miller.

In 1990 he held the Israeli records in three events: high jump 2.18 m', long jump 7.73 m' and triple jump 16.89 m'.

Rogel's records are:

- Triple Jump: 17.20 m' (17.31 m' wind 2.3)
- Long Jump: 7.96 m'
- High Jump: 2.18 m'

He is the current coach of Israel's Hanna Knyazyeva-Minenko.

== Achievements ==
Year	Competition	Venue	Position	Event	Notes
Representing Israel
1986	World Junior Championships	Athens, Greece	23rd (q)	Triple jump	14.68 m
1989	Universiade	Duisburg, West Germany	8th	Triple jump	16.47 m
1990	European Championships	Split, Yugoslavia	16th (q)	Triple jump	16.01 m (wind: +1.5 m/s)
1992	Olympic Games	Barcelona, Spain	24th	Triple jump	16.23 m
1995	World Championships	Gothenburg, Sweden	11th	Triple jump	16.73 m
1996	Olympic Games	Atlanta, United States	17th	Triple jump	16.67 m
1997	World Indoor Championships	Paris, France	6th	Triple jump	16.82 m
1998	European Indoor Championships	Valencia, Spain	4th	Triple jump	16.93 m = NRi
1998	European Championships	Budapest, Hungary	8th	Triple jump	16.99 m
1999	World Indoor Championships	Maebashi, Japan	7th	Triple jump	16.27 m

== Tests ==
=== Lifting ===
- Clean: 140 kg
- Hang clean 145 kg
- Snatch: 97.5 kg
- Half squat: 270 kg (on a bench)

=== Jumping ===
- Standing long jump: 3.39 m'
- Standing triple jump: 10.57 m'
- Standing 5 steps: 18.58 m'
- Standing 10 steps: 38.70 m'
- Standing high jump: 1.70 m'
- High jump with 2 legs: 2.03 m'
- Standing steps for 100 m': 26.5 steps

== See also ==
- List of Israeli records in athletics
- List of Maccabiah records in athletics
