= Francis Dodoo =

Ghanaian athlete (born 1960)

Personal information
- Nationality: Ghanaian
- Born: 13 April 1960 (age 66) Accra, Ghana
- Height: 1.63 m (5 ft 4 in)
- Weight: 70 kg (154 lb)

Sport
- Country: Ghana
- Sport: Long Jump and Triple Jump
Medal record
Men's athletics
Representing Ghana
African Championships
Silver medal – second place	1992 Belle Vue Harel	Triple jump

Francis Dodoo (born 13 April 1960) is a retired Ghanaian athlete who competed in the long jump and triple jump. He won a gold medal at the 1987 All-Africa Games and a silver medal at the 1992 African Championships, and his best placement in the Olympic Games was a 17th place from 1988.

He is currently a distinguished sociologist at Pennsylvania State University.

== Achievements ==
Year	Competition	Venue	Position	Event	Notes
Representing Ghana
1984	Olympic Games	Los Angeles, United States	23rd (q)	Triple jump	15.55 m
1985	Universiade	Kobe, Japan	12th	Triple jump	15.99 m
1987	Universiade	Zagreb, Yugoslavia	5th	Triple jump	16.78 m
1987	All-Africa Games	Nairobi, Kenya	1st	Triple jump	17.12 m
1987	World Championships	Rome, Italy	16th (q)	Triple jump	16.48 m
1988	Olympic Games	Seoul, South Korea	17th (q)	Triple jump	16.17 m
1992	African Championships	Belle Vue Maurel, Mauritius	2nd	Triple jump	16.43 m
1992	Olympic Games	Barcelona, Spain	—	Triple jump	DNF
1994	Commonwealth Games	Victoria, Canada	13th (q)	Triple jump	16.22 m
1996	Olympic Games	Atlanta, United States	26th (q)	Triple jump	16.24 m

== See also ==
- List of Pennsylvania State University Olympians
