= Tomsk State Pedagogical University =

- Russian: Томский государственный педагогический университет
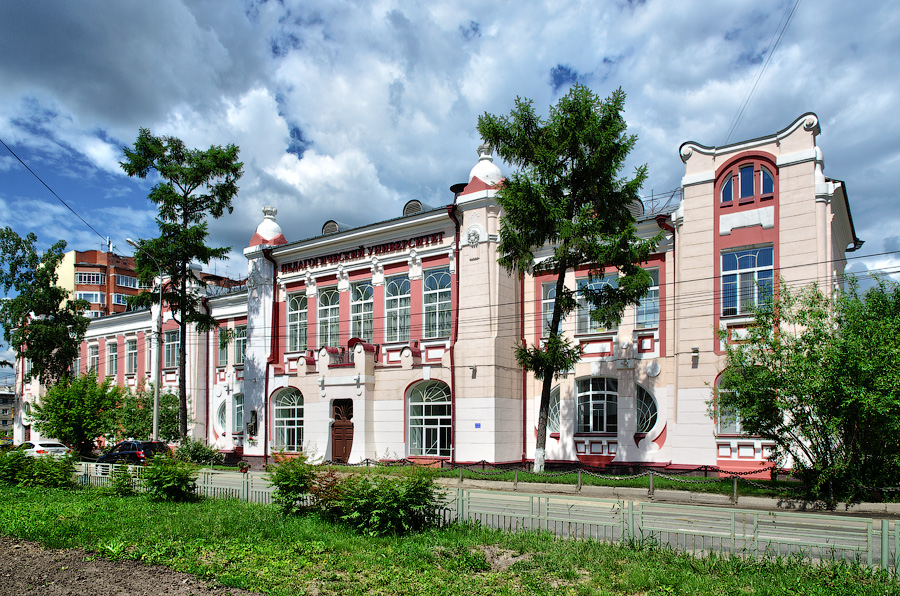
- Established: 1902
- Students: 6 847
- Location: Tomsk, Russia; 56°28′26″N 84°58′36″E
- Website: https://www.tspu.edu.ru/en/

University rankings

Regional – Overall
- QS Emerging Europe and Central Asia: 221-230 (2022)

Tomsk State Pedagogical University (Russian: Томский государственный педагогический университет) is a university in Tomsk, Russia. It is the successor of the Tomsk Teaching Institute founded in 1902. The foreign languages department started in 1939 as one of the first five departments of the university. Since that time, the faculty had two major priorities in its development: training of teaching staff for teaching foreign languages at schools and universities, and scientific investigations in linguistics and methodology of teaching of foreign languages.

== Faculties ==
- Faculty of Biology and Chemistry
- Faculty of Foreign Languages
- Faculty of History and Philology
- Faculty of Physics and Mathematics
- Faculty of Physical culture and Sport
- Faculty of Early childhood education and Primary education
- Faculty of Pedagogy
- Faculty of Psychology
- Faculty of Economics and Management
- Faculty of Technology and Entrepreneurship
- Faculty of Culture and Art
