= Volodymyr Kravchenko (triple jumper) =

Ukrainian triple jumper (born 1969)

Personal information
- Born: 22 December 1969 (age 56)

Sport
- Sport: Track and field

Volodymyr Kravchenko (Ukrainian: Володимир Кравченко; born 22 December 1969) is a Ukrainian triple jumper, best known for placing tenth at the 1996 Summer Olympics. His personal best was 16.80 metres, achieved in June 2000 in Kyiv.

== Achievements ==
Year	Competition	Venue	Position	Event	Notes
Representing Ukraine
1996	Olympic Games	Atlanta, United States	10th	Triple jump	16.62 m
1997	World Championships	Athens, Greece	29th (q)	Triple jump	16.24 m
1997	Universiade	Catania, Italy	7th	Triple jump	16.69 m
