= Kawan Lovelace =

Belizean triple jumper

Personal information
- Nationality: Belizean
- Born: 29 June 1976 (age 50)

Sport
- Sport: Athletics
- Event: Triple jump

Kawan Lovelace (born 29 June 1976) is a Belizean athlete. He competed in the men's triple jump at the 1996 Summer Olympics.
