= Igor Sautkin =

Russian triple jumper

Personal information
- Nationality: Russian
- Born: 23 February 1972 (age 54)

Sport
- Sport: Athletics
- Event: Triple jump

Igor Igorevich Sautkin (born 23 February 1972) is a Russian athlete. He competed in the men's triple jump at the 1996 Summer Olympics.
