= Andrey Kurennoy =

Russian triple jumper

Personal information
- Born: 12 May 1972 Krasnodar, Soviet Union
- Died: 7 January 2008 (aged 35)

Sport
- Sport: Track and field
Medal record
Representing Russia
Summer Universiade
Gold medal – first place	1995 Fukuoka	Triple jump

Andrey Kurennoy (Russian: Андрей Куренной; 12 May 1972 – 7 January 2008) was a Russian triple jumper. In 1997 he had a personal best of 17.44 m which won him the Russian title. He won gold at World University Games in 1995 in Fukuoka, Japan.
