= Vasif Asadov =

Azerbaijani triple jumper (born 1965)

Personal information
- Nationality: Azerbaijani
- Born: 27 August 1965 (age 60)

Sport
- Sport: Athletics
- Event: Triple jump
Medal record
Men's athletics
Representing Soviet Union
European Indoor Championships
| Bronze medal – third place | 1988 Budapest | Triple jump |
Representing Azerbaijan
Asian Championships
| Bronze medal – third place | 1995 Jakarta | Triple jump |

Vasif Asadov (born 27 August 1965) is a retired male triple jumper who represented the Soviet Union and later Azerbaijan. He won bronze medals at the 1988 European Indoor Championships in Budapest and the 1995 Asian Championships in Jakarta. He competed for Azerbaijan at the 1996 Summer Olympics, without reaching the final. His personal best results was 17.37 metres, achieved in February 1988 in Volgograd.

== Achievements ==
| Year | Competition | Venue | Position | Event | Notes |
Representing Azerbaijan
| 1996 | Olympic Games | Atlanta, United States | 27th | Triple jump | 16.21 m |
