= George Wright (triple jumper) =

Canadian triple jumper

Personal information
- Nationality: Canadian
- Born: 20 February 1963 (age 63) Westmoreland Parish, Jamaica

Sport
- Sport: Athletics
- Event: Triple jump

George Wright (born 20 February 1963) is a Canadian athlete. He competed in the men's triple jump at the 1988 Summer Olympics.
