= Festus Igbinoghene =

Nigerian athlete (born 1969)

Personal information
- Nationality: Nigerian
- Born: 21 October 1969 (age 56)

Sport
- Sport: Athletics
- Event: Triple jump

Festus Igbinoghene (born 21 October 1969) is a Nigerian athlete. He competed in the men's triple jump at the 1996 Summer Olympics.

He attended Mississippi State University as a long jumper and triple jumper. Igbinoghene won five SEC titles in the triple jump and long jump. He earned a bronze medal at the 1990 Commonwealth Games.

== Personal life ==
His son Noah Igbinoghene (born 1999) is an American football cornerback in the National Football League (NFL). His wife Faith Idehen earned a bronze medal in the 1992 Summer Olympics as a part of the Nigerian women's 4 x 100 relay team.
