= Jacob Katonon =

Kenyan triple jumper

Jacob Katonon (born 5 October 1969) is a Kenyan former triple jumper who competed in the 1996 Summer Olympics.
