= Richard Duncan (athlete) =

Canadian long jumper (born 1973)

Personal information
- Born: December 25, 1973 (age 52) Toronto, Ontario, Canada

Sport
- Sport: Athletics
- Event: Long jump

Richard Duncan (born December 25, 1973) is a retired Canadian long jumper. He was an eight-time NCAA All-American and an Olympian.

== Career ==
Duncan finished fourth at the 1994 Commonwealth Games, in the high jump event. In the long jump he competed at the 1996 Olympic Games, the 1997 World Championships, the 1999 World Championships the 2001 World Championships and the 2000 Olympic Games. While attending the University of Texas, Duncan was the first athlete in history to earn All-American honors in the same NCAA Championship meet competing in the long, high, and triple jump events.

== Honors ==
- 1993 CIAU Champion Triple Jump for York University
- 1996 NCAA Champion Long Jump for University of Texas
- 8 Time NCAA All-American

== Personal Bests ==
His personal best marks are:

- Long jump 8.23 metres, achieved in April 1997 in Austin.
- Triple jump 16.83 meters, achieved in May 1996 in Lubbock.
- High jump 2.26 meters, achieved in May 1994 in Austin, TX/Austin.
