= Aleksey Fatyanov =

Azerbaijani athlete (born 1969)

Personal information
- Nationality: Azerbaijani
- Born: 14 June 1969 (age 57)

Sport
- Sport: Athletics
- Event: Triple jump
Medal record
Men's athletics
Representing Azerbaijan
Asian Championships
Gold medal – first place	1993 Manila	Triple jump
Silver medal – second place	1995 Jakarta	Triple jump

Aleksey Fatyanov (born 14 June 1969) is an Azerbaijani athlete. He competed in the men's triple jump at the 1996 Summer Olympics.
