= Sergey Arzamasov =

Kazakhstani triple jumper (born 1971)

Personal information
- Born: 9 April 1971 (age 55) Shymkent, Ongtustik Kazakhstan

Sport
- Sport: Track and field
Medal record
Representing Kazakhstan
Asian Games
Gold medal – first place	1998 Bangkok	Triple jump
Bronze medal – third place	1994 Hiroshima	Triple jump
Asian Championships
Bronze medal – third place	1993 Manila	Triple jump
East Asian Games
Gold medal – first place	1997 Busan	Triple jump
Gold medal – first place	2001 Osaka	Long jump

Sergey Arzamasov (Russian: Серге́й Александрович Арзамасов; born 9 April 1971) is a retired Kazakhstani triple jumper. His personal best was 17.27 metres, achieved in the qualifying rounds at the 1995 World Championships in Gothenburg. In the final round he finished 12th and last, nonetheless his highest international placement. He also competed at the Olympic Games twice.

== Achievements ==
Year	Competition	Venue	Position	Event	Notes
Representing the Soviet Union
1990	World Junior Championships	Plovdiv, Bulgaria	5th	Triple jump	16.15 m (wind: +0.1 m/s)
Representing Kazakhstan
1996	Olympic Games	Atlanta, United States	36th	Triple jump	15.91 m
1997	East Asian Games	Busan, South Korea	1st	Triple jump	16.89 m
2001	East Asian Games	Osaka, Japan	3rd	Triple jump	16.13 m

- 1999 Central Asian Games - gold medal (long jump)
- 1998 Asian Games - gold medal
- 1997 Central Asian Games - gold medal
- 1995 World Championships - 12th place, 17.27m PB
- 1994 Asian Games - bronze medal
- 1993 Asian Championships - bronze medal
