= 1999 World Championships in Athletics – Men's triple jump =

These are the official results of the Men's triple jump event at the 1999 World Championships in Seville, Spain. There were a total number of 39 participating athletes, with the final held on Wednesday 25 August 1999.

== Medalists ==
Gold	Charles Friedek; Germany (GER)
Silver	Rostislav Dimitrov; Bulgaria (BUL)
Bronze	(United Kingdom) Jonathan Edwards; Great Britain (GBR)

== Schedule ==
- All times are Central European Time (UTC+1)

Qualification Round
Group A	Group B
23.08.1999 – 18:00h	23.08.1999 – 18:00h
Final Round
25.08.1999 – 20:05h

== Abbreviations ==
- All results shown are in metres

Q	automatic qualification
q	qualification by rank
DNS	did not start
NM	no mark
WR	world record
AR	area record
NR	national record
PB	personal best
SB	season best

== Qualification ==
- Held on Monday 23 August 1999 with the mark set on 17.00 metres (6 + 6 athletes)

RANK	GROUP A	DISTANCE
1.	Yoelbi Quesada (CUB)	16.88 m
2.	Paolo Camossi (ITA)	16.79 m
3.	Denis Kapustin (RUS)	16.73 m
4.	Jirí Kuntoš (CZE)	16.70 m
5.	Julian Golley (GBR)	16.68 m
6.	Ionut Punga (ROM)	16.67 m
7.	Desmond Hunt (USA)	16.66 m
8.	Ketill Hanstveit (NOR)	16.59 m
9.	Michael Calvo (CUB)	16.54 m
10.	Brian Wellman (BER)	16.45 m
11.	Sergey Arzamasov (KAZ)	16.32 m
12.	Von Ware (USA)	16.30 m
13.	Kenny Boudine (FRA)	16.19 m
14.	Raúl Chapado (ESP)	15.98 m
15.	Sergey Bochkov (AZE)	15.91 m
16.	Audrius Raizgys (LTU)	15.76 m
17.	Remmy Limo (KEN)	15.68 m
18.	Vitaliy Kolpakov (UKR)	15.64 m
19.	Johan Meriluoto (FIN)	15.59 m
—	Zsolt Czingler (HUN)	NM

RANK	GROUP B	DISTANCE
1.	Rostislav Dimitrov (BUL)	17.30 m
2.	Jonathan Edwards (GBR)	17.28 m
3.	Charles Friedek (GER)	17.16 m
4.	Jérôme Romain (FRA)	17.10 m
5.	LaMark Carter (USA)	17.01 m
6.	Andrew Murphy (AUS)	17.00 m
7.	Onochie Achike (GBR)	16.96 m
8.	Vasiliy Sokov (RUS)	16.85 m
9.	Rogel Nachum (ISR)	16.68 m
10.	Armen Martirosyan (ARM)	16.67 m
11.	Andrew Owusu (GHA)	16.63 m
12.	Oleg Sakirkin (KAZ)	16.58 m
13.	Yoel García (CUB)	16.56 m
14.	Zoran Đurđević (YUG)	16.52 m
15.	Vyacheslav Taranov (RUS)	16.45 m
16.	Mohamed Hamimid (FRA)	16.37 m
17.	Christos Meletoglou (GRE)	16.37 m
18.	Salem Mouled Al-Ahmadi (KSA)	16.24 m
19.	Gable Garenamotse (BOT)	15.53 m

== Final ==
RANK	FINAL	DISTANCE
	Charles Friedek (GER)	17.59 m
	Rostislav Dimitrov (BUL)	17.49 m
	Jonathan Edwards (GBR)	17.48 m
4.	Andrew Murphy (AUS)	17.32 m
5.	Paolo Camossi (ITA)	17.29 m
6.	LaMark Carter (USA)	17.10 m
7.	Jérôme Romain (FRA)	17.10 m
8.	Jirí Kuntoš (CZE)	17.00 m
9.	Denis Kapustin (RUS)	16.89 m
10.	Yoelbi Quesada (CUB)	16.88 m
11.	Onochie Achike (GBR)	16.59 m
12.	Vasiliy Sokov (RUS)	16.53 m
