= 2001 World Championships in Athletics – Men's triple jump =

These are the results of the Men's triple jump event at the 2001 World Championships in Athletics in Edmonton, Alberta, Canada.

In the first round, Walter Davis took the lead with a 17.20m. Now 35 years old, world record holder and 1995 champion Jonathan Edwards lurked in second place with a 16.84m. Early in the second round Yoel García moved into the lead with a 17.40m. Christian Olsson moved into second with a 17.28m. With his next jump, Olsson took the lead with a 17.47m. The next jumper on the runway was Edwards. His masters world record 17.92 m (58 ft 9 1/2 in) was more than a foot further than all but one of these jumpers had ever achieved. In the fifth round, Igor Spasovkhodskiy, who was only 7th at the end of the preliminary jumps, leapfrogged past Garcia with a 26 cm improvement in his personal best, 17.44m to take the bronze.

== Medalists ==
Gold	(United Kingdom) Jonathan Edwards; Great Britain (GBR)
Silver	Christian Olsson; Sweden (SWE)
Bronze	Igor Spasovkhodskiy; Russia (RUS)

== Schedule ==
- All times are Mountain Standard Time (UTC-7)

Qualification Round
Group A	Group B
04.08.2001 – 16:30	04.08.2001 – 16:30
Final Round
06.08.2001 – 17:00

== Results ==
=== Qualification ===
Qualification: Qualifying Performance 17.10 (Q) or at least 12 best performers (q) advance to the final.

Rank	Group	Athlete	Nationality	#1	#2	#3	Result	Notes
1	B	Jonathan Edwards	Great Britain	x	16.51	17.46	17.46	Q
2	A	Walter Davis	United States	17.22			17.22	Q, PB
3	B	Larry Achike	Great Britain	x	17.15		17.15	Q
4	A	Christian Olsson	Sweden	17.15			17.11	Q
5	A	Yoel García	Cuba	16.66	16.84	17.02	17.02	q
6	B	Igor Spasovkhodskiy	Russia	15.92	16.59	16.91	16.91	q, PB
7	B	Rostislav Dimitrov	Bulgaria	16.90	16.55	x	16.90	q
8	A	Paolo Camossi	Italy	x	16.25	16.89	16.89	q
9	B	Brian Wellman	Bermuda	16.78	16.69	16.54	16.78	q
10	A	Johan Meriluoto	Finland	16.25	16.76	16.64	16.76	q, SB
11	A	Phillips Idowu	Great Britain	x	16.74	x	16.74	q
12	A	Konstadinos Zalagitis	Greece	16.64	x	16.53	16.64	q
13	B	Marian Oprea	Romania	16.62	x	16.47	16.62	
14	B	LaMark Carter	United States	16.51	16.53	16.60	16.60	
15	B	Karl Taillepierre	France	16.58	16.38	16.27	16.58	
16	A	Aliaksandar Hlavatski	Belarus	x	x	16.56	16.56	
17	A	Andrew Murphy	Australia	x	15.97	16.46	16.46	
18	B	Takanori Sugibayashi	Japan	15.77	15.90	16.41	16.41	
19	B	Hristos Meletoglou	Greece	x	15.89	16.26	16.26	
20	A	Vasiliy Sokov	Uzbekistan	x	16.26	14.41	16.26	
21	A	Sergey Bochkov	Azerbaijan	16.11	16.19	x	16.19	
22	A	Avi Tayari	Israel	14.80	16.06	15.78	16.06	
23	B	Sergey Arzamasov	Kazakhstan	15.87	15.74	15.77	15.87	
24	B	Thomas Moede	Germany	14.91	x	15.83	15.83	
25	B	Shawn Peters	Canada	x	15.58	15.46	15.58	
26	B	Robert Howard	United States	x	15.58	15.46	15.57	
	A	Ionuț Pungă	Romania	x			NM	
	A	Arnis Filet	France				DNS	
	B	Jadel Gregório	Brazil				DNS	

=== Final ===
Rank	Athlete	Nationality	#1	#2	#3	#4	#5	#6	Result	Notes
1st place, gold medalist(s)	Jonathan Edwards	Great Britain	16.84	x	17.92	x	–	x	17.92	WL MWR
2nd place, silver medalist(s)	Christian Olsson	Sweden	13.99	17.28	17.47	–	16.96	–	17.47	
3rd place, bronze medalist(s)	Igor Spasovkhodskiy	Russia	16.79	16.69	16.37	16.89	17.44	16.88	17.44	PB
4	Yoel García	Cuba	17.06	17.40	17.06	17.23	17.22	17.34	17.40	SB
5	Walter Davis	United States	17.20	17.18	17.05	14.43	16.60	16.92	17.20	
6	Brian Wellman	Bermuda	15.69	16.81	16.39	x	–	–	16.81	
7	Larry Achike	Great Britain	16.75	16.67	16.79	16.77	15.48	16.74	16.79	
8	Rostislav Dimitrov	Bulgaria	16.24	16.50	16.70	16.72	x	16.47	16.72	
9	Phillips Idowu	Great Britain	16.32	16.60	16.08				16.60	
10	Johan Meriluoto	Finland	16.51	16.54	16.31				16.54	
11	Paolo Camossi	Italy	16.15	14.20	16.18				16.18	
12	Konstadinos Zalagitis	Greece	x	x	16.13				16.13	
