= 1997 World Championships in Athletics – Men's triple jump =

These are the official results of the Men's triple jump event at the 1997 IAAF World Championships in Athens, Greece. There were a total number of 40 participating athletes, with two qualifying groups and the final held on Friday 1997-08-08.

With the previous two major championships resulting in 18 metre jumps, expectations were high. All medalists from those championships made it into the finals. In addition to world record holder Jonathan Edwards and Olympic champion Kenny Harrison, there were three more athletes who had jumped beyond 17.70m

Edwards was the first to get over 17m in the first round with a 17.33m. Near the end of the round, Yoelbi Quesada took the lead with a 17.60m and his Cuban teammate Aliecer Urrutia followed up with a 17.23m. At the end of the second round Quesada had his best jump of the day, a personal best of 17.85 m (58 ft 6 3/4 in) and Urrutia moved into second place with his best 17.64m. After two round, Harrison only had a 17.05 to his credit, more than a metre less than his winning jump in Atlanta. Just before his final preliminary attempt he saw Christos Meletoglou put out a 17.12 to move into the eighth qualifying position, but next on the runway, Harrison could only make 17.04m and wouldn't be a player in the medals.

In the fourth round, Edwards' 17.66m put him back into second place. On his final attempt he improved to 17.69m but couldn't overtake Quesada.

== Qualifying round ==
- Held on Wednesday 1997-08-06 with the mark set on 17.00 metres (8+4 athletes)

| RANK | GROUP A | DISTANCE |
|---|---|---|
| 1. | Yoelbi Quesada (CUB) | 17.47 m |
| 2. | Jonathan Edwards (GBR) | 17.28 m |
| 3. | Kenny Harrison (USA) | 17.11 m |
| 4. | Christos Meletoglou (GRE) | 17.04 m |
| 5. | Jérôme Romain (DMA) | 17.03 m |
| 6. | Charles Friedek (GER) | 16.98 m |
| 7. | Brian Wellman (BER) | 16.84 m |
| 8. | Yoel García (CUB) | 16.79 m |
| 9. | Nikolay Raev (BUL) | 16.72 m |
| 10. | Andrey Kurennoy (RUS) | 16.59 m |
| 11. | Zoran Đurđević (YUG) | 16.49 m |
| 12. | Ketill Hanstveit (NOR) | 16.45 m |
| 13. | Avi Tayari (ISR) | 16.45 m |
| 14. | Tibor Ordina (HUN) | 16.38 m |
| 15. | Sergey Arzamasov (KAZ) | 16.37 m |
| 16. | Georges Sainte-Rose (FRA) | 16.32 m |
| 17. | Volodymyr Kravchenko (UKR) | 16.24 m |
| 18. | Audrius Raizgys (LTU) | 16.21 m |
| 19. | Xavier Montane (AND) | 14.58 m |
| — | Aleksandr Tumanov (TKM) | NM |

| RANK | GROUP B | DISTANCE |
|---|---|---|
| 1. | Aliecer Urrutia (CUB) | 17.11 m |
| 2. | Andrew Owusu (GHA) | 17.05 m |
| 3. | Serge Helan (FRA) | 17.01 m |
| 4. | Armen Martirosyan (ARM) | 16.98 m |
| 5. | Denis Kapustin (RUS) | 16.96 m |
| 6. | Francis Agyepong (GBR) | 16.83 m |
| 7. | Raúl Chapado (ESP) | 16.80 m |
| 8. | Robert Howard (USA) | 16.63 m |
| 9. | Rostislav Dimitrov (BUL) | 16.62 m |
| 10. | Ndabazinhle Mdhlongwa (ZIM) | 16.56 m |
| 11. | Vasiliy Sokov (RUS) | 16.42 m |
| 12. | Māris Bružiks (LAT) | 16.35 m |
| 13. | Oluyemi Sule (NGR) | 16.16 m |
| 14. | Yevgeniy Petin (UZB) | 16.13 m |
| 15. | Yuriy Osipenko (UKR) | 16.13 m |
| 16. | Zsolt Czingler (HUN) | 16.04 m |
| 17. | Paul Nioze (SEY) | 15.79 m |
| — | Majed Jabbar (IRQ) | NM |
| — | Paolo Camossi (ITA) | NM |
| — | Lao Jianfeng (CHN) | DNS |

== Final ==
| RANK | FINAL RANKING | DISTANCE | 1 | 2 | 3 | 4 | 5 | 6 |
|---|---|---|---|---|---|---|---|---|
| | Yoelbi Quesada (CUB) | 17.85 m | 17.60 | 17.85 | 17.60 | X | X | X |
| | Jonathan Edwards (GBR) | 17.69 m | 17.33 | X | 16.80 | 17.66 | 17.57 | 17.69 |
| | Aliecer Urrutia (CUB) | 17.64 m | 17.23 | 17.64 | 17.25 | 15.67 | X | X |
| 4. | Denis Kapustin (RUS) | 17.59 m | X | X | 17.29 | 17.19 | 17.59 | X |
| 5. | Brian Wellman (BER) | 17.22 m | X | 17.22 | 16.90 | X | X | X |
| 6. | Jérôme Romain (DMA) | 17.17 m | 16.75 | 17.17 | 16.85 | 16.87 | 16.62 | 16.63 |
| 7. | Christos Meletoglou (GRE) | 17.12 m | 16.75 | X | 17.12 | X | 16.48 | 16.85 |
| 8. | Andrew Owusu (GHA) | 17.11 m | 17.11 | 16.74 | 15.33 | X | 16.82 | 16.38 |
| 9. | Kenny Harrison (USA) | 17.05 m | X | 17.05 | 17.04 | | | |
| 10. | Serge Helan (FRA) | 16.97 m | 16.89 | X | 16.97 | | | |
| 11. | Charles Friedek (GER) | 16.86 m | 16.83 | X | 16.86 | | | |
| 12. | Armen Martirosyan (ARM) | 16.70 m | 16.46 | X | 16.70 | | | |

== See also ==
- 1996 Men's Olympic triple jump
