= 1998 European Athletics Championships – Men's triple jump =

Men's triple jump at the European Athletics Championships

These are the official results of the Men's triple jump event at the 1998 European Championships in Budapest, Hungary. There were a total number of 32 participating athletes, with two qualifying groups and the final held on Sunday August 23, 1998. The top twelve and ties, and all those reaching 16.90 metres advanced to the final. The qualification round was held in Saturday August 22, 1998.

== Medalists ==
Gold	(United Kingdom) Jonathan Edwards; Great Britain (GBR)
Silver	Denis Kapustin; Russia (RUS)
Bronze	Rostislav Dimitrov; Bulgaria (BUL)

== Abbreviations ==
- All results shown are in metres

Q	automatic qualification
q	qualification by rank
DNS	did not start
NM	no mark
WR	world record
AR	area record
NR	national record
PB	personal best
SB	season best

== Records ==
Standing records prior to the 1998 European Athletics Championships
World Record	Jonathan Edwards (GBR)	18.29 m	August 7, 1995	Gothenburg, Sweden
Event Record	Leonid Voloshin (URS)	17.74 m	August 31, 1990	(Socialist Federal Republic of Yugoslavia) Split, Yugoslavia
Broken records during the 1998 European Athletics Championships
Event Record	Jonathan Edwards (GBR)	17.99 m	August 23, 1998	Budapest, Hungary

== Qualification ==
=== Group A ===
Rank	Overall	Athlete	Attempts			Result	Note
Rank	Overall	Athlete	1	2	3	Result	Note
1	1	Aleksandr Glavatskiy (BLR)				17.10 m	
2	3	Jonathan Edwards (GBR)				16.97 m	
3	5	Vasiliy Sokov (RUS)				16.82 m	
4	8	Zoran Đurđević (SCG)				16.69 m	
5	9	Zsolt Czingler (HUN)				16.69 m	
6	11	Hrvoje Verzi (GER)				16.54 m	
7	12	Johan Meriluoto (FIN)				16.50 m	
8	13	Raúl Chapado (ESP)				16.49 m	
9	14	Audrius Raizgys (LTU)				16.39 m	
10	15	Yuriy Osipenko (UKR)				16.34 m	
11	18	Avi Tayari (ISR)				16.26 m	
12	23	Igor Gavrilenko (RUS)				16.12 m	
13	24	Hristos Meletoglou (GRE)				16.10 m	
14	25	Csaba Boros (ROM)				15.91 m	
15	27	Nikolay Raev (BUL)				15.54 m	
—	—	Eduardo Pérez (ESP)	X	X	X	NM	

=== Group B ===
Rank	Overall	Athlete	Attempts			Result	Note
Rank	Overall	Athlete	1	2	3	Result	Note
1	1	Charles Friedek (GER)				17.10 m	
2	4	Rogel Nachum (ISR)				16.87 m	
3	6	Denis Kapustin (RUS)				16.79 m	
4	7	Rostislav Dimitrov (BUL)				16.78 m	
5	10	Ketill Hanstveit (NOR)				16.55 m	
6	16	Armen Martirosyan (ARM)				16.33 m	
7	17	Julian Golley (GBR)				16.32 m	
8	19	Paolo Camossi (ITA)				16.24 m	
9	20	Colomba Fofana (FRA)				16.16 m	
10	21	Larry Achike (GBR)				16.13 m	
11	22	Jiří Kuntoš (CZE)				16.13 m	
12	26	Vitaliy Kolpakov (UKR)				15.69 m	
13	28	Stamatios Lenis (GRE)				15.42 m	
14	29	Alen Topolovcan (SLO)				14.65 m	
—	—	Galin Georgiev (BUL)	X	X	X	NM	
—	—	Yago Lamela (ESP)				DNS	

== Final ==
Rank	Athlete	Attempts						Result	Note
Rank	Athlete	1	2	3	4	5	6	Result	Note
1st place, gold medalist(s)	Jonathan Edwards (GBR)	17.84	17.53	—	—	—	17.99	17.99 m	CR
2nd place, silver medalist(s)	Denis Kapustin (RUS)	17.13	17.22	17.45	—	16.90	X	17.45 m	
3rd place, bronze medalist(s)	Rostislav Dimitrov (BUL)	17.26	X	X	X	X	X	17.26 m	
4	Aliaksandar Hlavatski (BLR)	16.56	17.22	16.93	X	16.77	X	17.22 m	
5	Vasiliy Sokov (RUS)	X	17.16	16.48	16.77	X	16.15	17.16 m	
6	Charles Friedek (GER)	X	16.94	16.92	X	17.04	16.98	17.04 m	
7	Zsolt Czingler (HUN)	16.45	16.20	17.03	X	16.75	X	17.03 m	
8	Rogel Nachum (ISR)	16.99	X	16.74	X	16.62	X	16.99 m	
9	Johan Meriluoto (FIN)	16.73	16.84	15.58				16.84 m	
10	Zoran Đurđević (SCG)	16.83	16.66	16.48				16.83 m	
11	Hrvoje Verzi (GER)	X	16.62	16.67				16.67 m	
12	Ketill Hanstveit (NOR)	16.43	16.53	16.58				16.58 m	

== See also ==
- 1997 Men's World Championships Triple Jump (Athens)
- 1999 Men's World Championships Triple Jump (Seville)
