= 1992 European Athletics Indoor Championships – Men's triple jump =

The men's triple jump event at the 1992 European Athletics Indoor Championships was held in Palasport di Genova on 1 March.

== Results ==
Rank	Name	Nationality	#1	#2	#3	#4	#5	#6	Result	Notes
1st place, gold medalist(s)	Leonid Voloshin	Unified Team	17.22	x	x	x	17.35	x	17.35	
2nd place, silver medalist(s)	Serge Hélan	France	16.23	16.90	–	17.18	16.96	17.10	17.18	
3rd place, bronze medalist(s)	Vasiliy Sokov	Unified Team	16.51	16.89	x	x	16.64	17.01	17.01	
4	Māris Bružiks	Latvia	x	16.67	16.71	x	x	16.78	16.78	
5	Audrius Raizgys	Lithuania	16.30	15.21	15.96	16.60	x	16.77	16.77	
6	Nikolay Raev	Bulgaria	16.63	x	x	16.52	x	16.68	16.68	
7	Galin Georgiev	Bulgaria	16.62	x	x	15.63	x	x	16.62	
8	Francis Agyepong	Great Britain	x	16.36	x	x	x	x	16.36	
9	Theodoros Tantanozis	Greece	16.08	16.09	16.27				16.27	
10	Vernon Samuels	Great Britain	15.66	16.03	16.22				16.22	
11	Zoran Đurđević	Yugoslavia	15.96	x	16.07				16.07	
12	André Ernst	Germany	x	15.84	16.06				16.06	
13	Santiago Moreno	Spain	x	16.04	x				16.04	
14	Đorđe Kožul	Yugoslavia	15.95	15.83	15.79				15.95	
15	Marios Hadjiandreou	Cyprus	x	15.85	15.77				15.85	
16	Xavier Montané	Andorra	x	x	14.67				14.67	
	Dario Badinelli	Italy							DNS	
