= 2001 IAAF World Indoor Championships – Men's triple jump =

The men's triple jump event at the 2001 IAAF World Indoor Championships was held on March 9.

== Results ==
Rank	Athlete	Nationality	#1	#2	#3	#4	#5	#6	Result	Notes
1st place, gold medalist(s)	Paolo Camossi	Italy	16.97	16.81	16.48	17.32	X	16.87	17.32	NR
2nd place, silver medalist(s)	Jonathan Edwards	Great Britain	17.06	17.12	X	17.12	16.79	17.26	17.26	
3rd place, bronze medalist(s)	Andrew Murphy	Australia	16.53	16.79	16.65	17.15	16.93	17.20	17.20	AR
4	Charles Friedek	Germany	15.69	17.11	17.13	X	X	16.90	17.13	SB
5	Rostislav Dimitrov	Bulgaria	16.65	16.91	X	X	16.88	X	16.91	SB
6	Fabrizio Donato	Italy	X	16.77	X	16.06	16.52	16.72	16.77	
7	Michael Calvo	Cuba	16.44	16.54	16.75	16.65	16.72	X	16.75	
8	Aleksandr Glavatskiy	Belarus	16.49	16.05	X	X	16.06	16.34	16.49	
9	Kenta Bell	United States	X	16.13	X				16.13	
	Igor Gavrilenko	Russia	X	X	X				NM	
	Ionut Punga	Romania	X	X	X				NM	
