= Michael Calvo =

Cuban triple jumper (born 1977)

Personal information
- Born: 26 December 1977 (age 48) Limonar, Matanzas Province, Cuba
Medal record
Athletics
Representing Cuba
Pan American Games
Bronze medal – third place	1999 Winnipeg	Triple jump
World Junior Championships
Silver medal – second place	1996 Sydney	Triple jump
CAC Junior Championships (U20)
Gold medal – first place	1996 San Salvador	Triple jump

Michael Calvo Villamil (born 26 December 1977) is a Cuban triple jumper.

== Career ==
His personal best jump is 17.30 metres, achieved in February 1997 in Havana. The result places him tenth on the all-time Cuban performers list, behind Yoelbi Quesada, Lázaro Betancourt, Aliecer Urrutia, Yoandri Betanzos, Alexander Martínez, Jorge Reyna, Yoel García, Pedro Pérez and Arnie David Giralt.

== Achievements ==
Year	Competition	Venue	Position	Event	Notes
Representing Cuba
1996	Central American and Caribbean Junior Championships (U-20)	San Salvador, El Salvador	1st	Triple jump	16.47 m
1996	World Junior Championships	Sydney, Australia	2nd	Triple jump	16.17 m
1999	Pan American Games	Winnipeg, Canada	3rd	Triple jump	17.03 m
1999	World Championships	Seville, Spain	9th (q)	Triple jump	16.54 m (-0.5 m/s)
2000	Ibero-American Championships	Rio de Janeiro, Brazil	1st	Triple jump	17.05 m CR
2000	Olympic Games	Sydney, Australia	15th (q)	Triple jump	16.30 m (0.3 m/s)
2001	World Indoor Championships	Lisbon, Portugal	7th	Triple jump	16.75 m
