= Njerve =

Njerve is a Norwegian surname. Notable people with the surname include:

- Jan Thomas Njerve (1927–2014), Norwegian painter
- Sigurd Njerve (born 1971), Norwegian triple jumper
- Embla Matilde Njerve (born 2007), Norwegian pole vaulter
