= 1998 European Athletics Indoor Championships – Men's triple jump =

The men's triple jump event at the 1998 European Athletics Indoor Championships was held on 28 February–1 March.

== Medalists ==
Gold	Silver	Bronze
Jonathan Edwards; Great Britain	Charles Friedek; Germany	Serge Hélan; France

== Results ==
=== Qualification ===
Qualification performance: 16.90 (Q) or at least 12 best performers (q) advanced to the final.

Rank	Group	Athlete	Nationality	#1	#2	#3	Result	Notes
1	A	Jonathan Edwards	Great Britain	17.15			17.15	Q
2	A	Serge Hélan	France	16.38	x	16.92	16.92	Q
3	B	Francis Agyepong	Great Britain	16.89	–	–	16.89	q
4	B	Charles Friedek	Germany	16.88	x	x	16.88	q
5	B	Georges Sainte-Rose	France	16.48	16.59	16.84	16.84	q
6	A	Zsolt Czingler	Hungary	16.28	16.82	–	16.82	q
7	B	Rogel Nachum	Israel	16.52	16.76	16.73	16.76	q
8	A	Denis Kapustin	Russia	16.38	x	16.67	16.67	q
9	A	Nikolay Raev	Bulgaria	16.63	16.64	16.39	16.64	q
10	A	Raúl Chapado	Spain	16.20	16.51	16.59	16.59	q
11	A	Yuriy Osipenko	Ukraine	16.05	16.37	16.56	16.56	q
12	B	Vyacheslav Taranov	Russia	16.05	16.51	16.22	16.51	q
13	B	Kjetil Hanstveit	Norway	16.46	x	16.41	16.46	
14	B	Jirí Kuntoš	Czech Republic	16.35	16.40	x	16.40	
15	A	Audrius Raizgys	Lithuania	16.01	16.24	x	16.24	
16	B	Julian Golley	Great Britain	15.53	15.98	16.19	16.19	

=== Final ===
Rank	Athlete	Nationality	#1	#2	#3	#4	#5	#6	Result	Notes
1st place, gold medalist(s)	Jonathan Edwards	Great Britain	17.43	x	–	–	17.40	x	17.43	
2nd place, silver medalist(s)	Charles Friedek	Germany	16.44	x	16.57	16.70	17.15	x	17.15	
3rd place, bronze medalist(s)	Serge Hélan	France	x	x	16.73	x	x	17.02	17.02	
4	Rogel Nachum	Israel	16.62	16.68	x	16.89	16.93	16.88	16.93	NR
5	Raúl Chapado	Spain	16.32	16.36	16.85	16.87	x	16.70	16.87	NR
6	Yuriy Osipenko	Ukraine	16.35	16.53	16.67	x	16.86	16.75	16.86	
7	Vyacheslav Taranov	Russia	16.38	16.10	16.75	16.63	x	16.52	16.75	
8	Francis Agyepong	Great Britain	16.57	x	x	16.14	–	16.26	16.57	
9	Zsolt Czingler	Hungary	16.16	16.56	16.52				16.56	
10	Denis Kapustin	Russia	16.34	16.50	x				16.50	
11	Georges Sainte-Rose	France	16.49	x	x				16.49	
12	Nikolay Raev	Bulgaria	16.44	16.13	16.39				16.44	
