= Hristos Meletoglou =

Greek triple jumper (born 1972)

Hristos Meletoglou (Greek: Χρήστος Μελέτογλου, born January 2, 1972) is a Greek triple jumper.

He was born in Heinsberg, West Germany.

His personal best jump is 17.19 metres, achieved in June 2001 in Bremen. This ranks him fourth among Greek triple jumpers, only behind Dimitrios Tsiamis, Konstadinos Zalaggitis and Stamatios Lenis.

== International competitions ==
Year	Competition	Venue	Position	Event	Notes
Representing Greece
1990	World Junior Championships	Plovdiv, Bulgaria	9th	Long jump	7.40 m
1991	European Junior Championships	Thessaloniki, Greece	10th (q)	Long jump	7.30 m
1997	World Championships	Athens, Greece	7th	Triple jump	17.12 m
1997	Mediterranean Games	Bari, Italy	2nd	Triple jump	16.50 m
1998	European Championships	Budapest, Hungary	24th (q)	Triple jump	16.10 m
1999	World Championships	Seville, Spain	27th (q)	Triple jump	16.37 m
2000	Olympic Games	Sydney, Australia	31st (q)	Triple jump	16.00 m
2001	World Championships	Edmonton, Canada	19th (q)	Triple jump	16.26 m
2002	European Championships	Munich, Germany	22nd (q)	Triple jump	15.24 m
2003	World Championships	Paris, France	7th	Triple jump	16.92 m
2004	World Indoor Championships	Budapest, Hungary	9th (q)	Triple jump	16.79 m
2004	Olympic Games	Athens, Greece	6th	Triple jump	17.13 m
2005	Mediterranean Games	Almería, Spain	1st	Triple jump	17.09 m
2005	World Championships	Helsinki, Finland	20th (q)	Triple jump	16.35 m
2006	European Championships	Gothenburg, Sweden	—	Triple jump	NM
