= Athletics at the 2000 Summer Olympics – Men's triple jump =

Men's triple jump at the Games of the XXVII Olympiad
- Pictogram for athletics
- Venue: Stadium Australia
- Date: 23 September 2000 (qualifying); 25 September 2000 (final)
- Competitors: 40 from 27 nations
- Winning distance: 17.71

Medalists
1st place, gold medalist(s)		Jonathan Edwards; Great Britain
2nd place, silver medalist(s)		Yoel García; Cuba
3rd place, bronze medalist(s)		Denis Kapustin; Russia

Official Video

The men's triple jump event at the 2000 Summer Olympics as part of the athletics program was held at the Olympic Stadium. Forty athletes from 27 nations competed. The maximum number of athletes per nation had been set at 3 since the 1930 Olympic Congress. The triple jump has been ever present since the beginning of the modern Olympic Games in 1896. The event was won by Jonathan Edwards of Great Britain, the nation's first victory in the men's triple jump since 1908 (and only the second overall). Edwards became the 12th man to win two medals in the event, adding gold to his 1996 silver. Yoel García's silver put Cuba on the podium for the second Games in a row.

== Background ==
This was the 24th appearance of the event, which is one of 12 athletics events to have been held at every Summer Olympics. The returning finalists from the 1996 Games were silver medalist Jonathan Edwards of Great Britain, bronze medalist Yoelbi Quesada of Cuba, fifth-place finisher Armen Martirosyan of Armenia, sixth-place finisher Brian Wellman of Bermuda (who had also made the final in 1992), and eighth-place finisher Robert Howard of the United States. Edwards (whose 1995 world record still stands in 2025) was the favorite, with Quesada (the 1997 world champion, over Edwards) also a strong contender. Charles Friedek of Germany, the 1999 world champion (Edwards had come in third) was present but injured.

No nations made their first appearance in the event, which had happened before only in 1904 (when the United States was the only nation to compete). The United States competed for the 23rd time, having missed only the boycotted 1980 Games.

== Qualification ==
Each National Olympic Committee was permitted to enter up to three athletes that had jumped 16.85 metres or further during the qualification period. The maximum number of athletes per nation had been set at 3 since the 1930 Olympic Congress. If an NOC had no athletes that qualified under that standard, one athlete that had jumped 16.65 metres or further could be entered.

== Competition format ==
The top twelve athletes from the three jumps in qualifying (and all who jumped 16.95 metres) progressed through to the final where the qualifying distances were scrapped and they started afresh with another three jumps. After these the top eight athletes carried their record forward and then had a further three attempts to decide the gold medalist.

== Records ==
Prior to the competition, the existing world and Olympic records were as follows.

World record	Jonathan Edwards (GBR)	18.29	Gothenburg, Sweden	7 August 1995
Olympic record	Kenny Harrison (USA)	18.09	Atlanta, United States	27 July 1996

== Schedule ==
All times are Australian Eastern Standard Time (UTC+10)

Date	Time	Round
Saturday, 23 September 2000	18:00	Qualifying
Monday, 25 September 2000	20:00	Final

== Results ==
All distances shown are in meters.

=== Qualifying ===
Held on 23 September 2000.

The qualifying distance was 16.95m. For all qualifiers who did not achieve the standard, the remaining spaces in the final were filled by the longest jumps until a total of 12 qualifiers.

Rank	Athlete	Nation	Group	1	2	3	Distance	Notes
1	Onochie Achike	Great Britain	A	16.71	17.30	–	17.30	Q, PB
2	Phillips Idowu	Great Britain	B	17.12	–	–	17.12	Q, PB
2	Andrew Murphy	Australia	B	17.12	–	–	17.12	Q, SB
4	Jonathan Edwards	Great Britain	B	16.90	17.08	–	17.08	Q
5	Yoel García	Cuba	B	17.08	–	–	17.08	Q
6	Denis Kapustin	Russia	B	17.04	–	–	17.04	Q
7	Yoelbi Quesada	Cuba	A	X	17.03	–	17.03	Q, SB
8	Rostislav Dimitrov	Bulgaria	A	17.00	–	–	17.00	Q
9	Charles Michael Friedek	Germany	B	16.93	X	X	16.93	q
9	Robert Howard	United States	B	X	16.93	X	16.93	q
11	Paolo Camossi	Italy	A	15.30	16.87	16.80	16.87	q
12	Walter Davis	United States	A	16.72	16.75	16.27	16.75	q
13	Ketill Hanstveit	Norway	B	16.62	16.62	16.75	16.75	
14	Ionut Punga	Romania	B	16.72	14.74	16.45	16.72	
15	Sergey Arzamasov	Kazakhstan	B	16.70	16.40	16.42	16.70	
16	Takanori Sugibayashi	Japan	A	16.31	16.44	16.67	16.67	
17	Christian Olsson	Sweden	A	16.45	16.56	16.64	16.64	
18	Zsolt Czingler	Hungary	A	16.22	16.52	X	16.52	
19	LaMark Carter	United States	A	X	16.16	16.47	16.47	
20	Brian Wellman	Bermuda	A	16.47	15.87	15.99	16.47	
21	Lao Jianfeng	China	B	16.43	16.04	X	16.43	
22	Ivaylo Rusenov	Bulgaria	B	16.24	16.40	X	16.40	
23	Rogel Nachum	Israel	B	16.38	16.39	16.38	16.39	
24	Gennadiy Markov	Russia	B	16.28	16.36	X	16.36	
25	Fabrizio Donato	Italy	B	16.34	15.75	X	16.34	
26	Zoran Đurđević	FR Yugoslavia	A	X	16.31	X	16.31	
27	Michael Calvo	Cuba	B	16.30	16.04	16.15	16.30	
28	Oleg Sakirkin	Kazakhstan	A	16.20	15.61	16.09	16.20	
29	Sergey Izmaylov	Ukraine	B	X	16.10	X	16.10	
30	Sergey Bochkov	Azerbaijan	B	X	16.01	X	16.01	
31	Hristos Meletoglou	Greece	B	X	16.00	X	16.00	
32	Salem Mouled Al-Ahmadi	Saudi Arabia	B	15.93	15.99	15.42	15.99	
33	Igor Spasovkhodskiy	Russia	A	15.79	15.51	13.41	15.79	
34	Yevgeniy Petin	Uzbekistan	A	X	15.27	X	15.27	
35	Armen Martirosyan	Armenia	B	14.95	–	–	14.95	
36	Colomba Fofana	France	A	X	14.59	X	14.59	
37	Konstadinos Zalaggitis	Greece	A	X	14.15	X	14.15	
38	Andrew Owusu	Ghana	A	X	14.12	X	14.12	
	Raúl Chapado	Spain	A	X	X	X	No mark	
	Stamatios Lenis	Greece	B	X	X	X	No mark	

=== Final ===
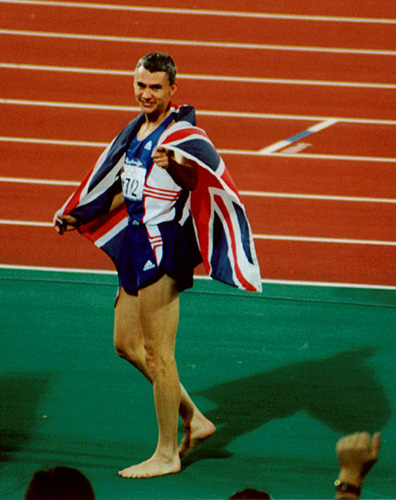
Jonathan Edwards celebrating his win

Rank	Athlete	Nation	1	2	3	4	5	6	Distance	Notes
1st place, gold medalist(s)	Jonathan Edwards	Great Britain	17.12	17.37	17.71	17.06	–	X	17.71	SB
2nd place, silver medalist(s)	Yoel García	Cuba	17.15	17.19	17.19	X	16.70	17.47	17.47	SB
3rd place, bronze medalist(s)	Denis Kapustin	Russia	X	17.46	16.73	17.17	X	17.16	17.46	SB
4	Yoelbi Quesada	Cuba	17.19	X	X	X	X	17.37	17.37	SB
5	Larry Achike	Great Britain	17.29	X	X	X	17.00	X	17.29	
6	Phillips Idowu	Great Britain	16.97	X	16.83	17.08	X	X	17.08	SB
7	Robert Howard	United States	X	17.05	16.59	X	16.75	16.77	17.05	
8	Paolo Camossi	Italy	16.96	16.60	X	16.39	16.95	X	16.96	
9	Rostislav Dimitrov	Bulgaria	16.95	16.72	X	Did not advance			16.95	
10	Andrew Murphy	Australia	16.74	16.70	16.80	Did not advance			16.80	
11	Walter Davis	United States	15.59	16.22	16.61	Did not advance			16.61	
–	Charles Friedek	Germany	X	X	X	Did not advance			No mark	
