= 1994 European Athletics Championships – Men's triple jump =

Men's triple jump at the European Athletics Championships

These are the official results of the Men's triple jump event at the 1994 European Championships in Helsinki, Finland. There were a total number of 20 participating athletes, with two qualifying groups and the final held on 13 August 1994. The top twelve and ties, and all those reaching 16.80 metres advanced to the final. The qualification round was held in Thursday August 11, 1994.

== Medalists ==
Gold	Denis Kapustin; Russia (RUS)
Silver	Serge Hélan; France (FRA)
Bronze	Māris Bružiks; Latvia (LAT)

== Abbreviations ==
- All results shown are in metres

Q	automatic qualification
q	qualification by rank
DNS	did not start
NM	no mark
WR	world record
AR	area record
NR	national record
PB	personal best
SB	season best

== Records ==
Standing records prior to the 1994 European Athletics Championships
World Record	Willie Banks (USA)	17.97 m	June 16, 1985	Indianapolis, United States
Event Record	Leonid Voloshin (URS)	17.74 m	August 31, 1990	(Socialist Federal Republic of Yugoslavia) Split, Yugoslavia

== Qualification ==
Qualification standard: 16.85 metres or 12 best qualified for the final

=== Group A ===
Rank	Overall	Athlete	Attempts			Result	Note
Rank	Overall	Athlete	1	2	3	Result	Note
1	3	Gennadiy Markov (RUS)				16.66 m	q
2	5	Māris Bružiks (LAT)				16.54 m	q
3	6	Zsolt Czingler (HUN)				16.45 m	q
4	7	Georges Sainte-Rose (FRA)				16.43 m	q
5	8	Julian Golley (GBR)	16.41 m			16.41 m	q
6	9	Vasiliy Sokov (RUS)				16.38 m	q
7	13	Alex Norca (FRA)				16.23 m	
8	14	Volker Mai (GER)				16.22 m	
9	17	Ketill Hanstveit (NOR)				15.84 m	
10	19	Pierre Andersson (SWE)				15.56 m	

=== Group B ===
Rank	Overall	Athlete	Attempts			Result	Note
Rank	Overall	Athlete	1	2	3	Result	Note
1	1	Jonathan Edwards (GBR)	16.20 m	16.72 m		16.72 m	q
2	2	Serge Hélan (FRA)				16.68 m	q
3	4	Denis Kapustin (RUS)				16.60 m	q
4	10	Audrius Raizgys (LTU)				16.37 m	q
5	11	Milan Mikuláš (CZE)				16.31 m	q
6	12	Heikki Herva (FIN)				16.24 m	q
7	15	Arne Holm (SWE)				16.21 m	
8	16	Marios Hadjiandreou (CYP)				16.07 m	
9	17	Stoyko Tsonov (BUL)				15.84 m	
—	—	Francis Agyepong (GBR)	X	X	X	NM	

== Final ==
Rank	Athlete	Attempts						Result	Note
Rank	Athlete	1	2	3	4	5	6	Result	Note
1st place, gold medalist(s)	Denis Kapustin (RUS)							17.62 m	PB
2nd place, silver medalist(s)	Serge Hélan (FRA)							17.55 m	NR
3rd place, bronze medalist(s)	Māris Bružiks (LAT)							17.20 m	
4	Vasiliy Sokov (RUS)							16.97 m	
5	Gennadiy Markov (RUS)							16.89 m	
6	Jonathan Edwards (GBR)							16.85 m	
7	Georges Sainte-Rose (FRA)							16.59 m	
8	Audrius Raizgys (LTU)							16.59 m	
9	Julian Golley (GBR)							16.35 m	
10	Milan Mikuláš (CZE)							16.29 m	
11	Zsolt Czingler (HUN)							16.21 m	
12	Heikki Herva (FIN)							16.08 m	

== Participation ==
According to an unofficial count, 20 athletes from 13 countries participated in the event.

- Bulgaria (1)
- Cyprus (1)
- Czech Republic (1)
- Finland (1)
- France (3)
- Germany (1)
- Hungary (1)
- Latvia (1)
- Lithuania (1)
- Norway (1)
- Russia (3)
- Sweden (2)
- United Kingdom (3)

== See also ==
- 1991 Men's World Championships Triple Jump (Tokyo)
- 1992 Men's Olympic Triple Jump (Barcelona)
- 1993 Men's World Championships Triple Jump (Stuttgart)
- 1995 Men's World Championships Triple Jump (Gothenburg)
- 1996 Men's Olympic Triple Jump (Atlanta)
- 1997 Men's World Championships Triple Jump (Athens)
