= 1992 World Junior Championships in Athletics – Men's triple jump =

The men's triple jump event at the 1992 World Junior Championships in Athletics was held in Seoul, South Korea, at Olympic Stadium on 18 and 19 September.

== Medalists ==
Gold	Yoelbi Quesada; Cuba
Silver	Osiris Mora; Cuba
Bronze	Ndabazinhle Mdhlongwa; Zimbabwe

== Results ==
=== Final ===
19 September

Rank	Name	Nationality	Attempts						Result	Notes
Rank	Name	Nationality	1	2	3	4	5	6	Result	Notes
1st place, gold medalist(s)	Yoelbi Quesada	Cuba	16.80 (w: -0.4 m/s)	16.58 (w: -0.5 m/s)	16.64 (w: -0.3 m/s)	16.72 (w: +0.3 m/s)	x	17.04 (w: +0.4 m/s)	17.04 (w: +0.4 m/s)	
2nd place, silver medalist(s)	Osiris Mora	Cuba	16.12 (w: -1.7 m/s)	16.83 (w: -0.3 m/s)	x	x	17.03 (w: +0.6 m/s)	x	17.03 (w: +0.6 m/s)	
3rd place, bronze medalist(s)	Ndabazinhle Mdhlongwa	Zimbabwe	15.80 (w: +0.2 m/s)	16.16 (w: -0.4 m/s)	16.13 (w: +0.1 m/s)	15.23 (w: -0.5 m/s)	16.57 (w: +0.9 m/s)	x	16.57 (w: +0.9 m/s)	
4	Yaroslav Ivanov	Bulgaria	15.84 (w: -0.5 m/s)	16.35 (w: -0.1 m/s)	15.49 (w: -0.2 m/s)	16.08 (w: -0.2 m/s)	16.17 (w: +0.4 m/s)	x	16.35 (w: -0.1 m/s)	
5	Peter Burge	Australia	15.74 (w: -0.5 m/s)	15.82 (w: -0.3 m/s)	16.19 (w: +0.2 m/s)	15.92 (w: -0.6 m/s)	-	15.69 (w: -0.2 m/s)	16.19 (w: +0.2 m/s)	
6	Lenards Ozoliņš	Latvia	15.35 (w: +0.4 m/s)	15.14 (w: -0.4 m/s)	15.85 (w: -0.2 m/s)	15.91 (w: +0.7 m/s)	14.21 (w: +0.1 m/s)	15.75 (w: 0.0 m/s)	15.91 (w: +0.7 m/s)	
7	Kenichi Sumita	Japan	15.78 (w: 0.0 m/s)	x	x	x	15.90 (w: -0.4 m/s)	x	15.90 (w: -0.4 m/s)	
8	Duan Qifeng	China	15.78 (w: -0.4 m/s)	x	15.34 (w: -0.6 m/s)	15.35 (w: +0.4 m/s)	-	-	15.78 (w: -0.4 m/s)	
9	Brian Ellis	United States	x	15.57 (w: -0.6 m/s)	x				15.57 (w: -0.6 m/s)	
10	Ketill Hanstveit	Norway	15.45 (w: -0.4 m/s)	15.52 (w: -1.1 m/s)	x				15.52 (w: -1.1 m/s)	
11	Larry Achike	United Kingdom	14.74 (w: 0.0 m/s)	15.33 (w: -0.2 m/s)	15.24 (w: -0.2 m/s)				15.33 (w: -0.2 m/s)	
12	Dmitriy Abakumov	Commonwealth of Independent States	x	15.16 (w: -1.3 m/s)	15.29 (w: -0.2 m/s)				15.29 (w: -0.2 m/s)	

=== Qualifications ===
18 Sep

==== Group A ====
Rank	Name	Nationality	Attempts			Result	Notes
Rank	Name	Nationality	1	2	3	Result	Notes
1	Osiris Mora	Cuba	16.41 (w: -0.7 m/s)	-	-	16.41 (w: -0.7 m/s)	Q
2	Ketill Hanstveit	Norway	15.78 (w: 0.0 m/s)	-	-	15.78 (w: 0.0 m/s)	Q
3	Larry Achike	United Kingdom	15.73 (w: +0.4 m/s)	-	-	15.73 (w: +0.4 m/s)	Q
4	Lenards Ozoliņš	Latvia	15.50 (w: -1.5 m/s)	15.71 (w: +0.3 m/s)	-	15.71 (w: +0.3 m/s)	Q
5	Yaroslav Ivanov	Bulgaria	15.71 (w: +0.2 m/s)	-	-	15.71 (w: +0.2 m/s)	Q
6	Peter Burge	Australia	15.66 (w: +0.6 m/s)	-	-	15.66 (w: +0.6 m/s)	Q
7	Dmitriy Abakumov	Commonwealth of Independent States	15.53 (w: -0.2 m/s)	15.52 (w: -0.7 m/s)	15.56 (w: -0.4 m/s)	15.56 (w: -0.4 m/s)	q
8	Brian Ellis	United States	x	x	15.55 (w: +0.6 m/s)	15.55 (w: +0.6 m/s)	q
9	Masayuki Sakaino	Japan	15.51 (w: +1.0 m/s)	x	15.53 (w: -0.7 m/s)	15.53 (w: -0.7 m/s)	
10	Kim Yeong-Mo	South Korea	x	15.30 (w: +0.2 m/s)	15.51 (w: +0.2 m/s)	15.51 (w: +0.2 m/s)	
11	Steffen Müller	Germany	15.21 (w: +0.3 m/s)	15.14 (w: -0.7 m/s)	14.53 (w: -1.0 m/s)	15.21 (w: +0.3 m/s)	
12	Avi Tayari	Israel	15.14 (w: -0.7 m/s)	14.80 (w: -0.2 m/s)	14.72 (w: +0.2 m/s)	15.14 (w: -0.7 m/s)	
13	Gökhan Gülsoy	Turkey	x	14.40 (w: -0.8 m/s)	x	14.40 (w: -0.8 m/s)	
14	Antônio da Costa	Brazil	14.38 (w: -1.0 m/s)	x	-	14.38 (w: -1.0 m/s)	

==== Group B ====
Rank	Name	Nationality	Attempts			Result	Notes
Rank	Name	Nationality	1	2	3	Result	Notes
1	Yoelbi Quesada	Cuba	16.82 (w: -0.5 m/s)	-	-	16.82 (w: -0.5 m/s)	Q
2	Duan Qifeng	China	14.88 (w: +1.0 m/s)	16.03 (w: +1.0 m/s)	-	16.03 (w: +1.0 m/s)	Q
3	Ndabazinhle Mdhlongwa	Zimbabwe	x	x	15.70 (w: -1.3 m/s)	15.70 (w: -1.3 m/s)	Q
4	Kenichi Sumita	Japan	x	15.08 (w: -1.0 m/s)	15.67 (w: -0.6 m/s)	15.67 (w: -0.6 m/s)	Q
5	Jason Wight	Australia	x	15.53 (w: -0.7 m/s)	15.11 (w: -0.6 m/s)	15.53 (w: -0.7 m/s)	
6	Aleksey Peshcherov	Commonwealth of Independent States	x	15.44 (w: +0.1 m/s)	15.42 (w: +0.4 m/s)	15.44 (w: +0.1 m/s)	
7	Daniel Román	Spain	14.88 (w: -0.2 m/s)	15.32 (w: +0.6 m/s)	15.41 (w: +0.7 m/s)	15.41 (w: +0.7 m/s)	
8	Márcio da Cruz	Brazil	15.05 (w: -0.9 m/s)	15.33 (w: +0.3 m/s)	x	15.33 (w: +0.3 m/s)	
9	Silvio Rietscher	Germany	15.32 (w: +0.5 m/s)	15.17 (w: +0.4 m/s)	x	15.32 (w: +0.5 m/s)	
10	Rostislav Dimitrov	Bulgaria	14.50 (w: +0.4 m/s)	15.22 (w: -0.6 m/s)	15.21 (w: -0.8 m/s)	15.22 (w: -0.6 m/s)	
11	Emmanuel Barnes-Smith	United States	x	14.70 (w: -0.4 m/s)	15.06 (w: +0.8 m/s)	15.06 (w: +0.8 m/s)	
12	Lee Ha-Sil	South Korea	x	14.75 (w: -0.5 m/s)	x	14.75 (w: -0.5 m/s)	
13	Gordon Mulenga	Zambia	14.74 (w: 0.0 m/s)	14.40 (w: +0.6 m/s)	14.61 (w: -0.6 m/s)	14.74 (w: 0.0 m/s)	
	Keita Cline	British Virgin Islands	x	x	x	NM	
	Paul L'Esperance	Seychelles	x	x	x	NM	

== Participation ==
According to an unofficial count, 29 athletes from 20 countries participated in the event.

- Australia (2)
- Brazil (2)
- British Virgin Islands (1)
- Bulgaria (2)
- China (1)
- Commonwealth of Independent States (2)
- Cuba (2)
- Germany (2)
- Israel (1)
- Japan (2)
- Latvia (1)
- Norway (1)
- Seychelles (1)
- South Korea (2)
- Spain (1)
- Turkey (1)
- United Kingdom (1)
- United States (2)
- Zambia (1)
- Zimbabwe (1)
