= 1997 IAAF World Indoor Championships – Men's triple jump =

The men's triple jump event at the 1997 IAAF World Indoor Championships was held on March 8–9.

== Medalists ==
Gold	Silver	Bronze
Yoel García; Cuba	Aliecer Urrutia; Cuba	Aleksandr Aseledchenko; Russia

== Results ==
=== Qualification ===
Qualification: 16.80 (Q) or at least 12 best performers (q) qualified for the final.

Rank	Group	Athlete	Nationality	#1	#2	#3	Result	Notes
1	B	Aliecer Urrutia	Cuba	17.45			17.45	Q
2	A	Charles Friedek	Germany	17.02			17.02	Q
3	A	Yoel García	Cuba	17.01			17.01	Q
4	A	Sigurd Njerve	Norway	16.92			16.92	Q
5	A	Tibor Ordina	Hungary	15.43	16.86		16.86	Q, PB
6	B	Andrew Murphy	Australia	x	16.69	16.83	16.83	Q
7	A	Ndabazinhle Mdhlongwa	Zimbabwe	16.26	16.55	16.82	16.82	Q
8	B	Rogel Nachum	Israel	16.82			16.82	Q, SB
9	A	Aleksandr Aseledchenko	Russia	16.75	16.64	16.24	16.75	q
10	A	Georges Sainte-Rose	France	16.56	16.74	16.32	16.74	q
11	B	Jérôme Romain	Dominica	16.45	16.57	16.72	16.72	q
12	B	Gennadiy Glushenko	Ukraine	16.37	15.98	16.71	16.71	q
13	B	Zsolt Czingler	Hungary	16.11	16.27	16.69	16.69	
14	A	LaMark Carter	United States	16.67	16.60	16.59	16.67	
15	B	Gennadiy Markov	Russia	16.65	x	16.31	16.65	
16	B	Serge Hélan	France	16.49	16.58	16.51	16.58	
17	A	Sergey Izmaylov	Ukraine	15.93	16.44	16.02	16.44	
18	A	Ionel Eftemie	Romania	16.21	16.24	16.39	16.39	
19	B	Salem Al-Ahmedi	Saudi Arabia	15.95	16.30	15.81	16.30	
20	B	Ivory Angello	United States	16.26	x	x	16.26	
21	A	Zeng Lizhi	China	x	16.25	15.85	16.25	
22	B	Anísio Silva	Brazil	16.22	x	15.70	16.22	
23	A	Messías José Baptista	Brazil	16.09	16.21	x	16.21	
24	A	Aleksey Fatyanov	Azerbaijan	15.62	15.35	15.38	15.62	
25	B	Brian Wellman	Bermuda	–	15.61	–	15.61	
	B	Carlos Calado	Portugal	x	–	–	DNF	

=== Final ===
Rank	Name	Nationality	#1	#2	#3	#4	#5	#6	Result	Notes
1st place, gold medalist(s)	Yoel García	Cuba	16.87	17.03	17.30	17.05	16.87	–	17.30	
2nd place, silver medalist(s)	Aliecer Urrutia	Cuba	16.93	17.27	17.08	17.11	–	–	17.27	
3rd place, bronze medalist(s)	Aleksandr Aseledchenko	Russia	–	17.22	16.82	16.71	–	17.22	17.22	PB
4	Charles Friedek	Germany	17.14	17.16	–	–	17.01	16.94	17.16	SB
5	Andrew Murphy	Australia	16.64	16.89	16.96	16.64	16.45	16.38	16.96	
6	Rogel Nachum	Israel	16.45	16.58	16.65	16.75	16.81	16.71	16.81	
7	Sigurd Njerve	Norway	15.48	16.81	–	–	–	–	16.81	
8	Tibor Ordina	Hungary	16.42	16.46	16.53	16.26	16.65	15.78	16.65	
9	Jérôme Romain	Dominica	16.52	16.33	–				16.52	
10	Georges Sainte-Rose	France	–	16.41	16.22				16.41	
11	Gennadiy Glushenko	Ukraine	16.20	–	16.41				16.41	
	Ndabazinhle Mdhlongwa	Zimbabwe	–	–	–				NM	
