= Hanstveit =

Hanstveit is a Norwegian surname. Notable people with the surname include:

- Erlend Hanstveit (born 1981), Norwegian footballer
- Ketill Hanstveit (born 1973), Norwegian triple jumper
