= Jiří Kuntoš =

Czech athletics competitor

Personal information
- Born: 2 October 1973 (age 53) Prague, Czechoslovakia

Sport
- Sport: Track and field
Medal record
Representing Czech Republic
Summer Universiade
| Bronze medal – third place | 1999 Palma de Mallorca | Triple jump |

Jiří Kuntoš (born 2 October 1973) is a Czech male former track and field athlete who competed in the long jump and triple jump. His international career briefly flourished in the late-1990s. He was a silver medallist behind Jonathan Edwards at the 1998 European Cup, a bronze medallist at the 1999 Summer Universiade, and a finalist at the 1999 World Championships in Athletics. He also represented his country at the European Athletics Indoor Championships and European Athletics Championships in 1998.

He is a six-time national champion, having won four straight titles in the triple jump at the Czech Athletics Championships from 1997 to 2000, as well as two indoor titles in 1997 and 1999. This included an outdoor championships record of 17.29 m (56 ft 8 1/2 in) in 1999, which was a lifetime best. He holds personal bests of 7.86 m (25 ft 9 1/4 in) for the long jump, set in 2000. His highest global ranking in the triple jump was eighth in the world for the 1999 season.

== International competitions ==
| Year | Competition | Venue | Position | Event | Notes |
|---|---|---|---|---|---|
| 1998 | European Indoor Championships | Valencia, Spain | 14th (q) | Triple jump | 16.40 m |
| 1998 | European Cup | Saint Petersburg, Russia | 2nd | Triple jump | 16.91 m |
| 1998 | European Championships | Budapest, Hungary | 22nd (q) | Triple jump | 16.13 m |
| 1999 | Universiade | Palma de Mallorca, Spain | 3rd | Triple jump | 16.97 m |
| 1999 | Universiade | Palma de Mallorca, Spain | 18th (q) | Long jump | 7.33 m |
| 1999 | World Championships | Seville, Spain | 8th | Triple jump | 17.00 m |

== National titles ==
- Czech Athletics Championships
  - Triple jump: 1997, 1998, 1999, 2000
- Czech Athletics Indoor Championships
  - Triple jump: 1997, 1999
