= 2000 European Athletics Indoor Championships – Men's triple jump =

The men's triple jump event at the 2000 European Athletics Indoor Championships was held on February 26–27.

== Medalists ==
Gold	Silver	Bronze
Charles Friedek; Germany	Rostislav Dimitrov; Bulgaria	Paolo Camossi; Italy

== Results ==
=== Qualification ===
Qualifying perf. 16.80 (Q) or 8 best performers (q) advanced to the Final.

Rank	Athlete	Nationality	#1	#2	#3	Result	Note
1	Rostislav Dimitrov	Bulgaria	16.98			16.98	Q, SB
2	Charles Friedek	Germany	16.96			16.96	Q
3	Paolo Camossi	Italy	16.86			16.86	Q
4	Ketill Hanstveit	Norway	16.67	16.39	X	16.67	q
5	Zsolt Czingler	Hungary	16.63	16.65	–	16.65	q
6	Fabrizio Donato	Italy	16.54	16.62	X	16.62	q, PB
7	Julian Golley	Great Britain	X	X	16.48	16.48	q
8	Ambrus Szabó	Hungary	16.45	16.28	16.45	16.45	q
9	Jérôme Romain	France	16.45	16.42	16.33	16.45	
10	Konstadinos Zalagitis	Greece	X	16.44	X	16.44	PB
11	Raúl Chapado	Spain	16.38	16.15	16.27	16.38	
12	Sergey Izmaylov	Ukraine	15.70	16.32	16.33	16.33	
13	Stamatis Lenis	Greece	X	X	16.33	16.33	
14	Igor Spasovkhodskiy	Russia	16.31	16.17	16.14	16.31	
15	Armen Martirosyan	Armenia	16.10	16.27	–	16.27	SB
16	Ionut Punga	Romania	X	X	16.26	16.26	
17	Boštjan Šimunič	Slovenia	15.86	16.21	X	16.21	
18	Colomba Fofana	France	16.21	–	–	16.21	
19	Gennadiy Markov	Russia	16.18	16.15	16.10	16.18	
20	Djeke Mambo	Belgium	16.13	X	X	16.13	
21	Sergey Kokhkin	Russia	15.99	16.09	16.07	16.09	
22	Christian Olsson	Sweden	X	X	15.95	15.95	
23	Kedjeloba Mambo	Belgium	15.52	15.62	15.60	15.62	

=== Final ===
Rank	Athlete	Nationality	#1	#2	#3	#4	#5	#6	Result	Note
1st place, gold medalist(s)	Charles Friedek	Germany	16.25	16.93	17.28	X	X	X	17.28	PB
2nd place, silver medalist(s)	Rostislav Dimitrov	Bulgaria	X	17.22	16.66	X	X	17.14	17.22	SB
3rd place, bronze medalist(s)	Paolo Camossi	Italy	17.05	16.05	X	X	X	X	17.05	NR
4	Zsolt Czingler	Hungary	16.77	16.62	16.66	16.81	X	17.00	17.00	
5	Ketill Hanstveit	Norway	15.87	16.72	16.62	X	14.63	X	16.72	SB
6	Fabrizio Donato	Italy	X	X	16.57	X	16.55	X	16.57	
7	Ambrus Szabó	Hungary	16.38	X	15.81	X	X	15.27	16.38	
8	Julian Golley	Great Britain	X	X	16.16	X	X	X	16.16	
