= Sergey Izmaylov =

Ukrainian triple jumper (born 1975)

Personal information
- Born: 1 May 1975 (age 51)

Sport
- Sport: Track and field

Sergey Izmaylov (born 1 May 1975) is a Ukrainian triple jumper.

He competed at the 1997 World Indoor Championships and the 2000 Olympic Games without reaching the final.

His personal best jump is 17.01 metres, achieved in August 2000 in Kyiv.

== Achievements ==
| Year | Competition | Venue | Position | Event | Notes |
Representing Ukraine
| 1994 | World Junior Championships | Lisbon, Portugal | 4th | Triple jump | 16.42 m w (wind: +3.5 m/s) |
| 1997 | World Indoor Championships | Paris, France | 17th (q) | Triple jump | 16.44 m |
| 1997 | European U23 Championships | Turku, Finland | 7th | Triple jump | 16.02 m (wind: -2.8 m/s) |
| 1997 | Universiade | Catania, Italy | 1st (q) | Triple jump | 16.90 m |
| 1999 | Universiade | Palma de Mallorca, Spain | 6th | Triple jump | 16.67 m |
| 2000 | European Indoor Championships | Ghent, Belgium | 12th | Triple jump | 16.33 m |
| 2000 | Olympic Games | Sydney, Australia | 29th (q) | Triple jump | 16.10 m |
