= Athletics at the 1991 Summer Universiade – Men's triple jump =

The men's triple jump event at the 1991 Summer Universiade was held at the Don Valley Stadium in Sheffield on 20 and 21 July 1991.

== Medalists ==
Gold	Silver	Bronze
Brian Wellman; Bermuda	Chen Yanping; China	Wu Lijun; China

== Results ==
=== Qualification ===
Rank	Athlete	Nationality	Result	Notes
1	Chen Yanping	China	16.60	q
2	Brian Wellman	Bermuda	16.33	q
3	Wu Lijun	China	16.12	q
4	Tyrone Scott	United States	16.08	q
4	Akira Anzai	Japan	16.08w	q
6	Daniele Buttiglione	Italy	16.01	q
6	Denis Kapustin	Soviet Union	16.01w	q
8	Matt Sweeney	Australia	15.92	q
8	Sergio Saavedra	Venezuela	15.92w	q
10	Benjamin Koech	Kenya	15.79w	q
11	Don Parish	United States	15.71	q
12	Peter Akwaboah	Great Britain	15.68w	q
13	Raúl Chapado	Spain	15.57	
14	Michael McDonald	Ireland	15.56w	
15	Ryu Jae-kyun	South Korea	15.50	
16	Maurizio Bartolini	Italy	15.43	
17	Lars Hedman	Sweden	15.42	
18	Hassan Ghazala	Morocco	15.12	
19	José Leitão	Portugal	14.87	
20	Yousan Lekahena	Indonesia	14.54	
21	Mohammad Ali Karimi	Iran	14.32	
22	Eben Esterhuizen	Namibia	14.08	

=== Final ===
Rank	Athlete	Nationality	#1	#2	#3	#4	#5	#6	Result	Notes
1st place, gold medalist(s)	Brian Wellman	Bermuda	17.07	14.51	x	–	–	–	17.07	NR
2nd place, silver medalist(s)	Chen Yanping	China							16.97	
3rd place, bronze medalist(s)	Wu Lijun	China							16.72w	
4	Denis Kapustin	Soviet Union							16.68	
5	Don Parish	United States							16.54	
6	Daniele Buttiglione	Italy							16.17	
7	Akira Anzai	Japan							16.01	
8	Sergio Saavedra	Venezuela							15.98	
9	Benjamin Koech	Kenya							15.97	
10	Tyrone Scott	United States							15.88	
11	Matt Sweeney	Australia							15.72	
12	Peter Akwaboah	Great Britain	15.68	13.57	15.28				15.68	
