= Andrew Owusu =

Ghanaian athlete (born 1972)

Personal information
- Born: July 8, 1972 (age 54)
- Height: 1.80 m (5 ft 11 in)
- Weight: 79 kg (174 lb; 12.4 st)

Sport
- Country: Ghana

Achievements and titles
- Personal bests: Long Jump – 8.12 m Triple Jump – 17.23 m
Medal record
Men's athletics
Representing Ghana
African Championships
Gold medal – first place	1998 Dakar	Triple jump
Gold medal – first place	2000 Algiers	Triple jump
Silver medal – second place	2002 Radès	Triple jump

Andrew Owusu (born July 8, 1972) is a Ghanaian athlete who competed in the triple jump and long jump.

His personal best in the triple jump is 17.23 meters, achieved in August 1998 in Dakar. This is the current Ghanaian record as well as the fourth best triple jump result in Africa, behind Ndabazinhle Mdhlongwa (17.34 m), Ajayi Agbebaku (17.26 m) and Khotso Mokoena (17.25 m). His personal best in the long jump is 8.12 meters, achieved on June 24, 1995, in Saarijärvi. His personal best in the long jump was a Ghanaian record between 1995 and 2003.

He received a doctorate degree from Middle Tennessee State University in 2004 and, as of 2021, is a Full Professor in the public health area within the Health and Human Performance Department at Middle Tennessee State University (MTSU). He also volunteers as a Track & Field assistant coach at MTSU in the horizontal jumping events.

Owusu was the country (Ghana) coordinator for the Ghana School-based Student Health Surveillance System (2006–2020). The latter surveillance system was jointly managed in partnership with the World Health Organization (WHO), US Centers for Disease Control and Prevention (CDC) and Ghana Education Service (GES).

Owusu attended the Presbyterian Boys' Secondary School (Presec Legon) and the University of Alabama, where he was an 8-time All-American with the Alabama Crimson Tide's Track and Field Team, competing in the long jump and triple jump. He became the university's record-holder in the Long Jump of Indoor Track and the Triple Jump of Outdoor Track, and was the 1996 NCAA National Champion in the Long Jump of NCAA Indoor Track and Field. He competed in the Summer 1996 Olympic Games (Atlanta), 2000 Olympic Games (Sydney) and 2004 Olympic Games (Athens), representing Ghana.

== Competition record ==
Year	Competition	Venue	Position	Event	Notes
Representing Ghana
1993	Universiade	Buffalo, United States	6th	Triple jump	16.31 m^{1}
1994	Commonwealth Games	Victoria, Canada	12th	Long jump	7.36 m
1995	World Championships	Gothenburg, Sweden	18th (q)	Long jump	7.85 m
1995	All-Africa Games	Harare, Zimbabwe	2nd	Long jump	8.01 m
1996	Olympic Games	Atlanta, United States	16th (q)	Long jump	7.91m m
1997	World Championships	Athens, Greece	8th	Triple jump	17.11 m
1998	African Championships	Dakar, Senegal	1st	Triple jump	17.23 m
1998	Commonwealth Games	Kuala Lumpur, Malaysia	2nd	Triple jump	17.03 m
1999	World Championships	Seville, Spain	18th (q)	Triple jump	16.63 m
1999	All-Africa Games	Johannesburg, South Africa	1st	Triple jump	16.89 m
2000	African Championships	Algiers, Algeria	1st	Triple jump	16.69 m
2000	Olympic Games	Sydney, Australia	38th (q)	Triple jump	14.12 m
2002	Commonwealth Games	Manchester, United Kingdom	4th	Triple jump	16.84 m
2002	African Championships	Radès, Tunisia	2nd	Triple jump	17.02 m (w)
2003	World Championships	Paris, France	8th	Triple jump	16.86 m
2003	All-Africa Games	Abuja, Nigeria	1st	Triple jump	16.41 m
2004	Olympic Games	Athens, Greece	19th (q)	Triple jump	16.64 m

- 1996 NCAA National Champion in Long Jump Indoor Track and Field - first place

^{1}Did not start in the final

Records
Preceded by Francis Dodoo	Triple Jump – Ghana; 1998 – present	Incumbent
Notes and references
1. Ghana Home Page

Olympic Games
Preceded by Kennedy Osei	Flagbearer for Ghana; 2004 Athens	Succeeded by Vida Anim
