= Francis Agyepong =

English triple jumper

Personal information
- Nationality: British (English)
- Born: 16 June 1965 (age 61) London, England
- Height: 179 cm (5 ft 10 in)
- Weight: 73 kg (161 lb)

Sport
- Sport: Athletics
- Event: Triple jump
- Club: Shaftesbury Barnet Harriers

Francis Keita Agyepong (born 16 June 1965) is a male English retired triple jumper who competed at the 1992 Summer Olympics and the 1996 Summer Olympics.

== Biography ==
Agyepong won the silver medal in at the 1996 European Indoor Championships in Athletics, and finished 7th at the 1995 IAAF World Indoor Championships. His personal best was 17.18 metres, achieved in July 1995 in London.

He represented England in the triple jump event, at the 1994 Commonwealth Games in Victoria, Canada.

Agyepong was six-times British triple jump champion after winning the British AAA Championships title in 1993, 1995, 1996 and 1997 and the UK Athletics Championships in 1990 and 1997.

== Personal life ==
His younger sister, Jacqui Agyepong, is a former hurdler.

== International competitions ==
Year	Competition	Venue	Position	Event	Notes
Representing Great Britain and England
1992	European Indoor Championships	Genoa, Italy	8th	Triple jump	16.36 m
1992	Olympic Games	Barcelona, Spain	18th (q)	Triple jump	16.55 m
1993	World Championships	Stuttgart, Germany	27th (q)	Triple jump	16.46 m
1994	European Indoor Championships	Paris, France	13th	Triple jump	16.27 m
1994	European Championships	Helsinki, Finland	—	Triple jump	NM
1994	Commonwealth Games	Victoria, British Columbia, Canada	6th	Triple jump	16.33 m
1995	World Indoor Championships	Barcelona, Spain	7th	Triple jump	16.74 m
1995	World Championships	Gothenburg, Sweden	14th (q)	Triple jump	16.58 m
1996	European Indoor Championships	Stockholm, Sweden	2nd	Triple jump	16.93 m
1996	Olympic Games	Atlanta, United States	13th (q)	Triple jump	16.71 m
1997	World Championships	Athens, Greece	13th (q)	Triple jump	16.83 m
1998	European Indoor Championships	Valencia, Spain	8th	Triple jump	16.57 m
