= Athletics at the 1999 Summer Universiade – Men's triple jump =

The men's triple jump event at the 1999 Summer Universiade was held on 8 and 10 July at the Estadio Son Moix in Palma de Mallorca, Spain.

== Medalists ==
Gold	Silver	Bronze
Yoelbi Quesada; Cuba	Charles Friedek; Germany	Jiří Kuntoš; Czech Republic

== Results ==
=== Qualification ===
Qualification: 16.50 (Q) or at least 12 best performers (q) advance to the final

Rank	Group	Athlete	Nationality	Result	Notes
1	B	Charles Friedek	Germany	17.05	Q
2	B	Yoelbi Quesada	Cuba	16.85	Q
3	B	LeVar Anderson	United States	16.73w	Q
4	A	Sergey Izmaylov	Ukraine	16.71w	Q
5	B	Yevgeniy Timofeyev	Russia	16.59	Q
6	A	Jiří Kuntoš	Czech Republic	16.44	q
7	B	Vitaliy Kolpakov	Ukraine	16.35	q
8	A	Ionuț Pungă	Romania	16.34	q
9	A	Avi Tayari	Israel	16.32	q
10	B	Kim Hyuk	South Korea	16.11	q
11	A	Dmitriy Vasilyev	Belarus	16.09	q
12	A	Conny Malm	Sweden	16.03	q
13	A	Demetrius Murray	United States	15.99	
14	A	Alvin Rentería	Colombia	15.34	
15	A	Ilja Tumorin	Estonia	15.30	
16	A	Chiu Chun-ching	Chinese Taipei	14.91	
17	B	Anders Møller	Denmark	14.71w	
18	B	Mpumelelo Ginindza	Swaziland	14.70	
	B	Felipe Apablaza	Chile	NM	
	B	Zaman Amm Zaman	Bangladesh	DNS	

=== Final ===
Rank	Athlete	Nationality	#1	#2	#3	#4	#5	#6	Result	Notes
1st place, gold medalist(s)	Yoelbi Quesada	Cuba	16.69	17.40	x	x	–	–	17.40	SB
2nd place, silver medalist(s)	Charles Friedek	Germany	17.20	x	x	x	x	15.70	17.20	SB
3rd place, bronze medalist(s)	Jiří Kuntoš	Czech Republic	x	16.27	16.55	16.91	x	16.97	16.97	
4	Ionuț Pungă	Romania	x	16.63	x	13.92	x	16.97	16.97	
5	LeVar Anderson	United States							16.73	
6	Sergey Izmaylov	Ukraine							16.67	
7	Yevgeniy Timofeyev	Russia							16.38	
8	Vitaliy Kolpakov	Ukraine							16.33	
9	Dmitriy Vasilyev	Belarus							16.00	
10	Kim Hyuk	South Korea							15.83	
11	Avi Tayari	Israel							15.79	
12	Conny Malm	Sweden							15.14	
