= Athletics at the 2002 Commonwealth Games – Men's triple jump =

Men's triple jump at the Commonwealth Games

The men's triple jump event at the 2002 Commonwealth Games was held on 28 July.

== Results ==
=== Final ===
Rank	Athlete	Nationality	#1	#2	#3	#4	#5	#6	Result	Notes
1st place, gold medalist(s)	Jonathan Edwards	England	16.26	x	17.86	–	–	–	17.86	GR
2nd place, silver medalist(s)	Phillips Idowu	England	16.83	17.68	17.25	x	–	–	17.68	PB
3rd place, bronze medalist(s)	Leevan Sands	Bahamas	16.87	17.26	16.47	x	x	16.64	17.26	
4	Andrew Owusu	Ghana	16.41	x	16.84	16.78	x	–	16.84	
5	Tosin Oke	England	16.60	x	16.65	x	–	–	16.65	PB
6	Steven Shalders	Wales	x	16.26	x	x	16.32	16.37	16.37	
7	Andrew Murphy	Australia	x	16.37	x	x	x	x	16.37	
8	Brian Wellman	Bermuda	x	15.84	x	–	–	–	15.84	
9	Quincy Howe	Trinidad and Tobago	15.79	x	x				15.79	
10	Dominic Ukwome	Nigeria	15.42	x	x				15.42	
11	Ayata Joseph	Anguilla	15.15	x	x				15.15	
12	Fagamanu Sofai	Samoa	14.24	13.94	13.56				14.24	
	Karibataake Katimiri	Kiribati							DNS	
