= Gennadiy Markov =

Russian triple jumper

Gennadiy Vladimirovich Markov (Russian: Геннадий Владимирович Маркова; born 15 June 1967 in Izobilny, Soviet Union) is a Russian triple jumper. His personal best jump is 17.38 metres, achieved in May 1994 in Stavropol.

He competed at the 1997 World Indoor Championships and the 2000 Olympic Games without reaching the final.

== Achievements ==
Year	Competition	Venue	Position	Event	Notes
Representing Russia
1994	Goodwill Games	St. Petersburg, Russia	4th	Triple jump	17.04 m
1994	European Championships	Helsinki, Finland	5th	Triple jump	16.89 m
1997	World Indoor Championships	Paris, France	15th (q)	Triple jump	16.65 m
2000	European Indoor Championships	Helsinki, Finland	19th (q)	Triple jump	16.18 m
2000	Olympic Games	Sydney, Australia	24th (q)	Triple jump	16.36 m
