= 1986 South American Junior Championships in Athletics =

XVIII South American Junior Championships in Athletics
- Dates: September 13–16
- Host city: Quito, Ecuador
- Venue: Estadio Los Chasquis
- Level: Junior
- Events: 38
- Participation: about 201 athletes from 9 nations

The 18th South American Junior Championships in Athletics were held in Quito, Ecuador, at the Estadio Los Chasquis between September 13–16, 1986.

== Participation (unofficial) ==
Detailed result lists can be found on the "World Junior Athletics History" website. An unofficial count yields the number of about 201 athletes from about 9 countries: Argentina (31), Brazil (48), Chile (11), Colombia (9), Ecuador (45), Panama (6), Paraguay (2), Peru (36), Venezuela (13).

== Medal summary ==
Medal winners are published for men and women Complete results can be found on the "World Junior Athletics History" website.

=== Men ===
Event	Gold		Silver		Bronze	
100 metres	Luis Smith (PAN)	10.31Aw	Gerardo Meinardi (ARG)	10.49Aw	Óscar Fernández (PER)	10.63Aw
200 metres	Luis Smith (PAN)	21.20A	Gerardo Meinardi (ARG)	21.32A	Washington Rodrigues (BRA)	21.38A
400 metres	Washington Rodrigues (BRA)	47.82A	Sérgio Moreira (BRA)	48.78A	Milton Alvear (PAN)	49.24A
800 metres	Antônio dos Santos (BRA)	1:54.54A	Clodoaldo do Carmo (BRA)	1:54.57A	Ricardo Morrison (PAN)	1:57.48A
1500 metres	Herder Vásquez (COL)	4:07.7A	Manuel Balmaceda (CHI)	4:07.7A	Clodoaldo do Carmo (BRA)	4:11.4A
5000 metres	Néstor Jami (ECU)	15:35.73A	Herder Vásquez (COL)	15:55.45A	Jorge Chancusig (ECU)	15:58.60A
110 metres hurdles	Miguel Saldarriaga (COL)	14.83A	Juan Phillips (PAN)	15.10A	Javier del Río (PER)	15.13A
400 metres hurdles	Gonzalo González (VEN)	53.89A	Cristián Courbis (CHI)	54.02A	Fábio Aleixo (BRA)	54.25A
2000 metres steeplechase	José Castillo (PER)	6:12.0A	Wander Moura (BRA)	6:16.5A	Eddy Punina (ECU)	6:18.1A
4 × 100 metres relay	Brazil; Carlos Agra; Carlos Alexandre; Sérgio Cierio; Pedro Alencar	40.62A	Venezuela; Dionisio Lugo; Iván Romero; Nelson García; Sergio Saavedra	41.25A	Argentina; Marcelo Ducart; Carlos Gats; Andrés Andreacchio; Gerardo Meinardi	41.57A
4 × 400 metres relay	Brazil; Washington Rodrigues; Lourival Nascimento; Sérgio Moreira; Gerardo Oliveira	3:15.97A	Ecuador; Edwin Sacotto; Aurelio Mancheno; Freddy Mercado; Gerardo Reyes	3:18.73A	Argentina; Andres Andreacchio; Fernando Marzano; Ariel Pintos; Fernando Senac	3:19.65A
10,000 metres track walk	Sergundo López (COL)	46:55.5A	Juan Rojas (ECU)	47:31.4A	Antônio Köhler (BRA)	51:35.7A
High jump	José Luís Mendes (BRA)	2.20A	Fernando Moreno (ARG)	2.12A	Hugo Peyrel (ARG)	2.06A
Pole vault	Miguel Saldarriaga (COL)	4.60A	Dean Torres (ECU)	4.40A	Martín Bossio (ARG)	4.40A
Long jump	Ricardo Valiente (PER)	7.33A	Winston Ascanio (VEN)	7.05A	Sergio Saavedra (VEN)	6.99A
Triple jump	Sergio Saavedra (VEN)	15.87A	Winston Ascanio (VEN)	15.25A	Luiz Teixeira (BRA)	15.57A
Shot put	Alberto Auad (ECU)	16.81A	Fernando Figueirêdo (BRA)	16.39A	Ricardo Romero (ARG)	15.98A
Discus throw	Fernando Figueirêdo (BRA)	45.40A	Gerardo Piñero (ARG)	44.74A	Ramón Jiménez (PAR)	44.68A
Hammer throw	Adrián Marzo (ARG)	64.88A	Leonardo Schenone (ARG)	58.08A	Roberto Lozano (COL)	55.56A
Javelin throw	Luis Carrasco (VEN)	65.34A	Feliciano Alvarado (VEN)	60.48A	Fernando Peñafiel (ECU)	59.02A
Decathlon	Rubén Bortolín (ARG)	6286A	Dilermando Alves (BRA)	6047A	Dean Torres (ECU)	5910A

=== Women ===
Event	Gold		Silver		Bronze	
100 metres	Cruezimar Gomes (BRA)	12.06A	Ximena Restrepo (COL)	12.10A	Soledad Bacarezza (CHI)	12.28A
200 metres	Ximena Restrepo (COL)	24.08A	Jupira da Graça (BRA)	24.77A	Milagros Allende (ARG)	24.81A
400 metres	Marta dos Santos (BRA)	55.73A	Claudia Riquelme (CHI)	57.33A	Adriana Martínez (ECU)	57.48A
800 metres	Luiza do Nascimento (BRA)	2:14.04A	Célia dos Santos (BRA)	2:22.00A	Mercedes Trujillo (ECU)	2:24.80A
1500 metres	Luiza do Nascimento (BRA)	5:01.6A	Ximena Albán (ECU)	5:06.0A	Jorilda Sabino (BRA)	5:11.4A
3000 metres	María Medina (ECU)	11:02.9A	Rosmira Poblador (COL)	11:18.1A	Ximena Albán (ECU)	11:46.4A
100 metres hurdles	Carolina Gutiérrez (ARG)	14.40A	Clarice Kuhn (BRA)	14.58A	Marise Alvim (BRA)	15.11A
400 metres hurdles	Adriana Martínez (ECU)	62.14A	Maureen Reyes (VEN)	63.49A	Carolina Schlossberg (ARG)	66.49A
4 × 100 metres relay	Brazil; Francisca da Silva; Rita Gomes; Renata Coutinho; Cruezimar Borges	47.04A	Argentina; Silvina Grion; Nancy Chemini; Milagros Allende; Carolina Gutiérrez	47.34A	Ecuador; Durán; Cristína Rojas; Cristina Bustamante; Adriana López	49.04A
4 × 400 metres relay	Brazil; Francisca da Silva; Marta Magalhães; Célia dos Santos; Jupira da Graça	3:52.69A	Ecuador; Cristina Bustamante; Ferigra; Adriana López; Adriana Martínez	3:56.99A	Argentina; Carolina Gutiérrez; Nancy Chemini; Patricia Repetto; Mabel Arrua	3:59.87A
High jump	Clarice Kuhn (BRA)	1.75A	Fernanda Mosquera (COL)	1.72A	Nancy Piva (ARG)	1.72A
Long jump	Ana Martina Vizioli (ARG)	5.85A	Renata Coutinho (BRA)	5.67A	Carolina Gutiérrez (ARG)	5.59A
Shot put	María Grimaldi (ARG)	12.16A	Ana Viglione (ARG)	11.35A	Elvira Ruiz (PER)	11.07A
Discus throw	Elvira Ruiz (PER)	42.58A	Cristine Neher (BRA)	40.22A	Ruth Martínez (VEN)	39.40A
Javelin throw	Rosemeire Costa (BRA)	41.42A	Cristine Neher (BRA)	39.86A	Claudia Silva (CHI)	39.34A
Heptathlon	Alexandra Dumas (BRA)	4382A	Marleide Leite (BRA)	3931A	Carolina Schlossberg (ARG)	3892A

== Medal table (unofficial) ==
* Host nation (Ecuador)

Rank	Nation	Gold	Silver	Bronze	Total
1	Brazil (BRA)	15	12	7	34
2	Argentina (ARG)	5	7	11	23
3	Colombia (COL)	5	4	1	10
4	Ecuador (ECU)*	4	5	8	17
5	Venezuela (VEN)	3	5	2	10
6	Peru (PER)	3	0	3	6
7	Panama (PAN)	2	1	2	5
8	Chile (CHI)	0	3	2	5
9	Paraguay (PAR)	0	0	1	1
Totals (9 entries)		37	37	37	111
