= Sigurd Njerve =

Norwegian triple jumper

Sigurd Njerve (born 12 September 1971) is a former Norwegian triple jumper. He represented IL Norna-Salhus.

He finished tenth at the 1996 European Indoor Championships in Stockholm and seventh at the 1997 IAAF World Indoor Championships in Paris. Participating at the 1996 Summer Olympics, he did not manage to reach the final. He became Norwegian champion in 1995, 1996 and 2000.

His personal best jump was 17.01 metres, achieved in June 1996 in Helsinki. This places him second on the Norwegian all-time performers list, only behind Ketill Hanstveit.

He is father of the Pole Vaulter Embla Matilde Njerve.

== Achievements ==
Year	Competition	Venue	Position	Event	Notes
Representing Norway
1996	European Indoor Championships	Stockholm, Sweden	10th	Triple jump	16.33 m
1996	Olympic Games	Atlanta, United States	30th (q)	Triple jump	16.15 m
1997	World Indoor Championships	Paris, France	7th	Triple jump	16.81 m
