= Audrius Raizgys =

Lithuanian triple jumper (born 1969)

Audrius Raizgys (born 4 April 1969) is a retired male triple jumper from Lithuania. His personal best jump is 17.29 metres, achieved in July 1995 in Vilnius. This is the current Lithuanian record.

He finished eighth at the 1994 European Athletics Championships in Helsinki with a jump of 16.59 metres. In addition he competed at the World Championships in 1993, 1995, 1997 and 1999, the World Indoor Championships in 1993 and 1995 and the 1996 Summer Olympics without reaching the finals there.

== International competitions ==
Year	Competition	Venue	Position	Event	Notes
Representing Lithuania
1992	European Indoor Championships	Genoa, Italy	5th	Triple jump	16.77 m
1993	World Indoor Championships	Toronto, Ontario, Canada	13th (q)	Triple jump	16.33 m
1993	World Championships	Stuttgart, Germany	34th (q)	Triple jump	16.05 m
1994	European Indoor Championships	Paris, France	12th	Triple jump	16.28 m
1994	European Championships	Helsinki, Finland	8th	Triple jump	16.59 m
1995	World Indoor Championships	Barcelona, Spain	15th (q)	Triple jump	16.41 m
1995	World Championships	Gothenburg, Sweden	20th (q)	Triple jump	16.40 m
1996	Olympic Games	Atlanta, United States	23rd (q)	Triple jump	16.38 m
1997	World Championships	Athens, Greece	30th (q)	Triple jump	16.21 m
1998	European Indoor Championships	Valencia, Spain	15th (q)	Triple jump	16.24 m
1998	European Championships	Budapest, Hungary	14th (q)	Triple jump	16.39 m
1999	World Championships	Seville, Spain	34th (q)	Triple jump	15.76 m
