= Raúl Chapado =

Spanish triple jumper (born 1970)

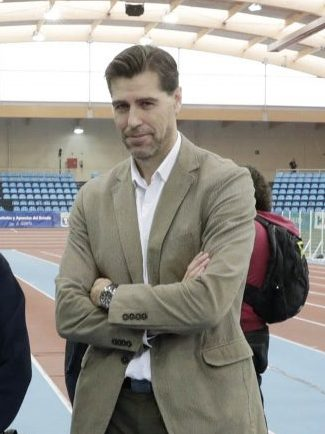
- Raúl Chapado in 2017

Personal information
- Born: 4 May 1970 (age 56) Ávila, Spain

Sport
- Sport: Track and field
Medal record
Representing Spain
Mediterranean Games
Bronze medal – third place	2001 Tunis	Triple jump

Raúl Chapado Serrano (born 4 May 1970) is a retired male triple jumper from Spain. His personal best was 16.83 metres, achieved in August 1997 in Rovereto. He had a better indoor personal best, of 16.87 metres. This was a national record at the time. He is the president of the Royal Spanish Athletics Federation.

== Achievements ==
Year	Competition	Venue	Position	Event	Notes
Representing Spain
1989	European Junior Championships	Varaždin, Yugoslavia	–	Triple jump	NM
1991	Universiade	Sheffield, United Kingdom	13th (q)	Triple jump	15.57 m
1992	Ibero-American Championships	Seville, Spain	7th	Triple jump	15.53 m w (wind: +2.6 m/s)
1997	World Championships	Athens, Greece	14th (q)	Triple jump	16.80 m
1998	European Indoor Championships	Valencia, Spain	5th	Triple jump	16.87 m (=NRi)
1998	Ibero-American Championships	Lisbon, Portugal	3rd	Triple jump	16.41 m
1998	European Championships	Budapest, Hungary	13th (q)	Triple jump	16.49 m
1999	World Championships	Seville, Spain	32nd (q)	Triple jump	15.98 m
2000	European Indoor Championships	Ghent, Belgium	11th (q)	Triple jump	16.38 m
2000	Olympic Games	Sydney, Australia	–	Triple jump	NM
2001	Mediterranean Games	Radès, Tunisia	3rd	Triple jump	16.41 m (w)
2002	World Cup	Madrid, Spain	8th	Triple jump	15.91 m
