= 1996 European Athletics Indoor Championships – Men's triple jump =

The men's triple jump event at the 1996 European Athletics Indoor Championships was held in Stockholm Globe Arena on 9–10 March.

== Medalists ==
Gold	Silver	Bronze
Māris Bružiks; Latvia	Francis Agyepong; Great Britain	Armen Martirosyan; Armenia

== Results ==
=== Qualification ===
Qualification performance: 16.70 (Q) or at least 12 best performers (q) advanced to the final.

Rank	Athlete	Nationality	#1	#2	#3	Result	Notes
1	Francis Agyepong	Great Britain	16.97			16.97	Q
2	Aleksandr Aseledchenko	Russia	16.80			16.80	Q
3	Māris Bružiks	Latvia	16.58	16.63	–	16.63	q
4	Sigurd Njerve	Norway	14.65	15.32	16.58	16.58	q
5	Ketill Hanstveit	Norway	16.39	16.57	–	16.57	q
6	Ionel Eftemie	Romania	16.47	16.46	15.90	16.47	q
7	Armen Martirosyan	Armenia	15.08	16.26	16.46	16.46	q
8	Arne Holm	Sweden	16.38	x	x	16.38	q
9	Igor Gavrilenko	Russia	15.36	16.24	16.37	16.37	q
10	Lars Hedman	Sweden	16.04	16.24	16.04	16.24	q
11	Yaroslav Ivanov	Bulgaria	x	15.94	16.19	16.19	q
12	Galin Georgiev	Bulgaria	15.87	x	15.98	15.98	q
13	Viktor Sotnikov	Russia	14.52	15.46	15.67	15.67	
14	Carlos Calado	Portugal	15.50	15.63	15.48	15.63	
15	Murat Ayaydın	Turkey	x	14.66	x	14.66	
	Kenny Boudine	France				DNS	

=== Final ===
Rank	Name	Nationality	#1	#2	#3	#4	#5	#6	Result	Notes
1st place, gold medalist(s)	Māris Bružiks	Latvia	16.75	x	16.83	16.93	x	16.97	16.97	
2nd place, silver medalist(s)	Francis Agyepong	Great Britain	16.79	16.93	16.50	-	x	x	16.93	
3rd place, bronze medalist(s)	Armen Martirosyan	Armenia	x	16.40	x	x	16.30	16.74	16.74	
4	Aleksandr Aseledchenko	Russia	x	16.37	x	16.70	16.28	16.15	16.70	
5	Arne Holm	Sweden	16.46	16.60	16.33	16.07	16.57	15.21	16.60	
6	Igor Gavrilenko	Russia	16.38	x	16.58	x	16.42	16.50	16.58	
7	Ionel Eftemie	Romania	15.92	16.50	x	15.60	x	16.21	16.50	
8	Ketill Hanstveit	Norway	x	16.35	16.17	x	x	x	16.35	
9	Yaroslav Ivanov	Bulgaria	x	16.34	16.08				16.34	
10	Sigurd Njerve	Norway	x	16.24	16.33				16.33	
11	Galin Georgiev	Bulgaria	16.18	x	x				16.18	
	Lars Hedman	Sweden	x	x	x				NM	
