= Sergio Saavedra (athlete) =

Venezuelan athlete (born 1968)

Personal information
- Full name: Sergio Gustavo Saavedra
- Born: 8 February 1968 (age 58)

Sport
- Sport: Athletics
- Event: Triple jump
Medal record
Representing Venezuela
Central American and Caribbean Games
Bronze medal – third place	1990 Mexico City	Triple jump
Bronze medal – third place	1993 Ponce	Triple jump
South American Games
Gold medal – first place	1994 Valencia	Triple jump

Sergio Gustavo Saavedra (born 8 February 1968) is a retired Venezuelan athlete who specialised in the triple jump. He won multiple medals at regional level.

His personal best in the event is 16.86 metres set in Medellín in 1989. This is a standing national record.

== International competitions ==
Year	Competition	Venue	Position	Event	Notes
Representing Venezuela
1984	Central American and Caribbean; Junior Championships (U17)	San Juan, Puerto Rico	5th	Heptathlon	3508 pts
1985	Bolivarian Games	Cuenca, Ecuador	1st	Triple jump	15.27 m
1986	Central American and Caribbean; Junior Championships (U20)	Mexico City, Mexico	6th	Triple jump	15.75 m
1986	South American Junior Championships	Quito, Ecuador	2nd	4 × 100 m relay	41.25 s
1986	South American Junior Championships	Quito, Ecuador	3rd	Long jump	6.99 m
1986	South American Junior Championships	Quito, Ecuador	1st	Triple jump	15.87 m
1987	South American Junior Championships	Santiago, Chile	4th	Long jump	7.03 m
1987	South American Junior Championships	Santiago, Chile	2nd	Triple jump	15.45 m
1988	Ibero-American Championships	Mexico City, Mexico	7th	Triple jump	15.94 m
1989	Bolivarian Games	Maracaibo, Venezuela	1st	Triple jump	15.96 m
1989	South American Championships	Medellín, Colombia	1st	Triple jump	16.86 m
1990	Central American and Caribbean Games	Mexico City, Mexico	3rd	Triple jump	16.18 m
1991	South American Championships	Manaus, Brazil	5th	Long jump	7.20 m
1991	South American Championships	Manaus, Brazil	2nd	Triple jump	15.98 m
1991	Universiade	Sheffield, United Kingdom	8th	Triple jump	15.98 m
1993	Bolivarian Games	Cochabamba, Bolivia	2nd	Long jump	7.59 m
1993	Bolivarian Games	Cochabamba, Bolivia	1st	Triple jump	16.47 m
1993	South American Championships	Lima, Peru	6th	Triple jump	15.96 m
1993	Universiade	Buffalo, United States	26th (q)	Long jump	7.04 m
1993	Universiade	Buffalo, United States	15th (q)	Triple jump	15.40 m
1993	Central American and Caribbean Championships	Cali, Colombia	1st	Triple jump	16.49 m
1993	Central American and Caribbean Games	Ponce, Puerto Rico	3rd	Triple jump	16.30 m
1994	Ibero-American Championships	Mar del Plata, Argentina	4th	Triple jump	15.79 m
1994	South American Games	Valencia, Venezuela	1st	Triple jump	16.26 m
1995	South American Championships	Manaus, Brazil	6th	Long jump	7.00 m
1995	South American Championships	Manaus, Brazil	2nd	Triple jump	16.25 m
1997	Bolivarian Games	Arequipa, Peru	1st	Triple jump	15.82 m
