= Osiris Mora =

Cuban triple jumper (born 1973)

Osiris Mora (born 3 October 1973) is a retired Cuban triple jumper.

He won the silver medal at the 1992 World Junior Championships, the bronze medal at the 1995 Central American and Caribbean Championships, and the bronze medal at the 1996 Ibero-American Championships.

His personal best jump was 17.03 metres, achieved at the 1992 World Junior Championships in Seoul.
