= Charles Friedek =

German triple jumper

Personal information
- Full name: Charles Michael Friedek
- Born: 26 August 1971 (age 55) Gießen, West Germany
- Height: 1.84 m (6 ft 0 in)
- Weight: 80 kg (176 lb)
Medal record
Men's athletics
Representing Germany
World Championships
Gold medal – first place	1999 Seville	Triple jump
World Indoor Championships
Gold medal – first place	1999 Maebashi	Triple jump
European Championships
Silver medal – second place	2002 Munich	Triple jump
European indoor Championships
Gold medal – first place	2000 Ghent	Triple jump
Silver medal – second place	1998 Valencia	Triple jump
Summer Universiade
Silver medal – second place	1999 Palma de Mallorca	Triple jump

Charles Michael Friedek (born 26 August 1971) is a German triple jumper who became world champion in 1999 with a jump of 17.59 metres. He had already won the World Indoor Championships the same year, with an indoor PB of 17.18 metres.

In 2002, he won a silver medal at the European Championships with 17.33 metres. At the European Indoor Championships, he won a silver medal in 1998 and gold in 2000.

== Competition record ==
Year	Competition	Venue	Position	Notes
Representing West Germany
1989	European Junior Championships	Varaždin, Yugoslavia	–	NM
1990	World Junior Championships	Plovdiv, Bulgaria	12th	15.53 m
Representing Germany
1996	Olympic Games	Atlanta, United States	14th (q)	16.71 m
1997	World Indoor Championships	Paris, France	4th	17.16 m
1997	World Championships	Athens, Greece	11th	16.86 m
1997	Universiade	Catania, Italy	5th	16.90 m
1998	European Indoor Championships	Valencia, Spain	2nd	17.15 m
1998	European Championships	Budapest, Hungary	6th	17.04 m
1999	World Indoor Championships	Maebashi, Japan	1st	17.18 m
1999	Universiade	Palma de Mallorca, Spain	2nd	17.20 m
1999	World Championships	Seville, Spain	1st	17.59 m
2000	European Indoor Championships	Ghent, Belgium	1st	17.28 m
2000	Olympic Games	Sydney, Australia	9th (q)	16.93 m
2001	World Indoor Championships	Lisbon, Portugal	4th	17.13 m
2002	European Championships	Munich, Germany	2nd	17.33 m
2004	Olympic Games	Athens, Greece	–	NM
2005	World Championships	Helsinki, Finland	26th (q)	15.75 m
2009	World Championships	Berlin, Germany	–	NM
