= Yoel García =

Cuban triple jumper (born 1973)

Personal information
- Born: November 25, 1973 (age 52)
Medal record
Men's Athletics
Representing Cuba
Olympic Games
Silver medal – second place	2000 Sydney	Triple Jump
World Indoor Championships
Gold medal – first place	1997 Paris	Triple Jump

Yoel García Luis (born November 25, 1973, in Nueva Gerona, Isla de la Juventud) is a Cuban triple jumper who he won the silver medal at the 2000 Summer Olympics, equalling his personal best with 17.47. His first Olympics was the one of 1996, where he finished 20th in the qualification round.

== Competition record ==
Year	Competition	Venue	Position	Notes
Representing the Cuba
1995	Pan American Games	Mar del Plata, Argentina	3rd	17.21 m (w)
1995	World Championships	Gothenburg, Sweden	5th	17.16 m
1996	Olympic Games	Atlanta, United States	20th (q)	16.62 m
1997	World Indoor Championships	Paris, France	1st	17.30 m
1997	Central American and Caribbean Championships	San Juan, Puerto Rico	2nd	17.28 m (w)
1997	World Championships	Athens, Greece	15th (q)	16.79 m
1999	World Championships	Seville, Spain	21st (q)	16.56 m
2000	Olympic Games	Sydney, Australia	2nd	17.47 m
2001	World Championships	Edmonton, Canada	4th	17.40 m
2004	Ibero-American Championships	Huelva, Spain	2nd	16.59 m

== Personal Best ==
- Indoor 17.62 m
- Outdoor 17.47 m
