= Embla Matilde Njerve =

Norwegian athlete (born 2007)

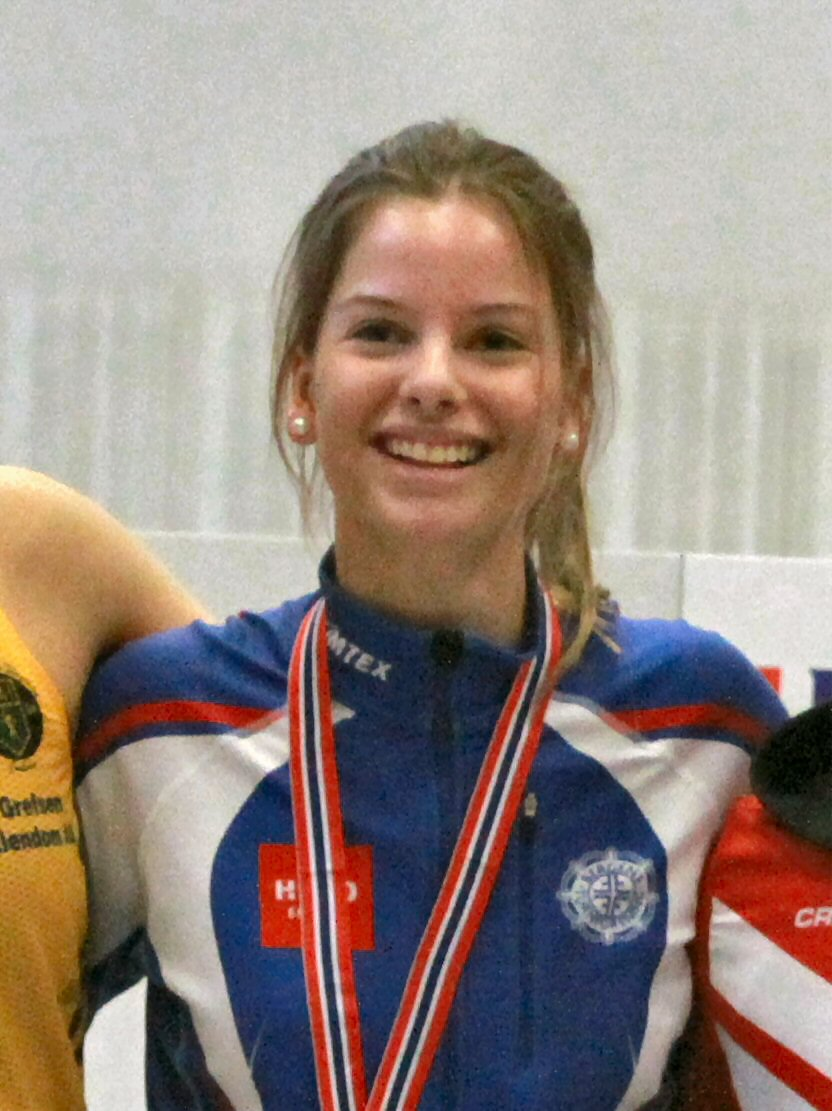

Personal information
- Nationality: Norwegian
- Born: 22 February 2007 (age 19) Bergen, Norway

Sport
- Sport: Athletics
- Event: Pole Vault

Achievements and titles
- Personal best: Pole Vault: 4.30m (2024) NU20R
Medal record
Women's athletics
Representing Norway
European U18 Championships
Silver medal – second place	2024 Banská Bystrica	Pole vault
European Youth Olympic Festival
Bronze medal – third place	2023 Maribor	Pole vault

Embla Matilde Njerve (born 22 February 2007) is a Norwegian pole vaulter. She became Norwegian national champion at the Norwegian Indoor Athletics Championships in 2024.

== Early life ==
Embla is from Landås, Bergen. She started pole vault when she was ten years old. She studied at Metis High School in Bergen.

== Career ==
Embla is a member of the Bergen Gymnastics Association. In June 2022, she jumped a personal best to finish fifth at the Norwegian Athletics Championships, despite being one of the youngest in the competition at the age of 15 years old.

She finished third at the Norwegian Indoor Athletics Championships in 2023 in Bærum. She won a bronze medal at the 2023 European Youth Olympic Games in Maribor, Slovenia.

She won the pole vault at the 2024 Norwegian Indoor Athletics Championships in Steinkjerhallen, Steinkjer in February 2024, for her first senior national title. She finished second in the pole vault at the Norwegian Athletics Championships in June 2024. She was a silver medalist in the pole vault at the 2024 European Athletics U18 Championships in Banská Bystrica, Slovakia. In August 2024, she won the Nordic U20 Championships in Denmark. Later that month, she cleared 4.30 metres at the Norwegian U18 Championships in Oslo, to set new Norwegian under-18 and under-20 records in the pole vault.

In Gothenburg in January 2025 she cleared 4.28 metres to also set a new U20 Norwegian indoor record, surpassing the previous record set by Lene Retzius. She finished third in the pole vault at the Norwegian Indoor Athletics Championships in February 2025. In May 2025, she announced she would miss the outdoor season in 2025 due to Infectious mononucleosis.

== Personal life ==
Her father Sigurd Njerve competed for Norway in the triple jump at the 1996 Olympic Games. She has many followers on social media with videos of her competing in 2024 surpassing 100 million views.
