= Aliecer Urrutia =

Cuban triple jumper (born 1974)

Personal information
- Born: September 22, 1974 (age 52) Villa Clara, Cuba

Sport
- Sport: Track and field
Medal record
Representing Cuba
World Championships
| Bronze medal – third place | 1997 Athens | Triple jump |
World Indoor Championships
| Silver medal – second place | 1997 Paris | Triple jump |
Summer Universiade
| Silver medal – second place | 1997 Catania | Triple jump |
Central American and Caribbean Games
| Silver medal – second place | 1998 Maracaibo | Triple jump |

Aliecer Urrutia Delgado (born September 22, 1974) is a retired male triple jumper from Cuba. Having set a personal best of 17.70 in 1996, he won a silver medal at the 1997 IAAF World Indoor Championships and a bronze medal at the 1997 World Championships. He is a former world indoor record holder with a mark of 17.83 metres. Urrutia retired after the 2002 season.

== Achievements ==
| Year | Competition | Venue | Position | Event | Notes |
Representing Cuba
| 1993 | Central American and Caribbean Championships | Cali, Colombia | 2nd | Triple jump | 16.35 m |
| 1996 | Olympic Games | Atlanta, United States | 15th | Triple jump | 16.71 m |
| 1997 | World Indoor Championships | Paris, France | 2nd | Triple jump | 17.27 m |
| 1997 | World Championships | Athens, Greece | 3rd | Triple jump | 17.64 m |
| 1997 | Universiade | Catania, Italy | 2nd | Triple jump | 17.11 m |
| 1998 | Central American and Caribbean Games | Maracaibo, Venezuela | 2nd | Triple jump | 16.53 m |
| 2002 | Ibero-American Championships | Guatemala City, Guatemala | 2nd | Triple jump | 16.26 m |
