= Johan Meriluoto =

Finnish triple jumper

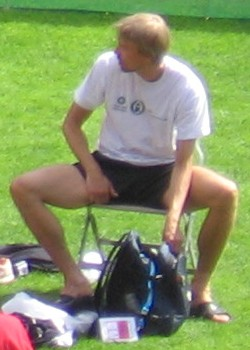
Johan Meriluoto in Kalevan kisat 2008

Johan Cristian Meriluoto (born 22 March 1974, in Porvoo) is a male triple jumper from Finland. His personal best jump is 16.95 metres (55.6 ft), achieved in August 2000 in Turku.

He finished ninth at the 1998 European Championships and tenth at the 2001 World Championships. He also competed at the 1999 World Championships and the 2005 World Championships without reaching the final.

== Achievements ==
Year	Competition	Venue	Position	Event	Notes
Representing Finland
1998	European Championships	Budapest, Hungary	9th	Triple jump	16.84 m
1999	World Championships	Seville, Spain	37th	Triple jump	15.59 m
2001	World Championships	Edmonton, Canada	10th	Triple jump	16.54 m
2005	World Championships	Helsinki, Finland	25th	Triple jump	16.01 m
