= Māris Bružiks =

Latvian triple jumper

Personal information
- Born: 25 August 1962 (age 64) Pļaviņas, Latvian SSR, Soviet Union

Sport
- Sport: Track and field
Medal record
Representing Soviet Union
European Championships
Silver medal – second place	1986 Stuttgart	Triple jump
European Indoor Championships
Gold medal – first place	1986 Madrid	Triple jump
Summer Universiade
Bronze medal – third place	1987 Zagreb	Triple jump
Representing Latvia
World Indoor Championships
Silver medal – second place	1995 Gothenburg	Triple jump
European Championships
Bronze medal – third place	1994 Helsinki	Triple jump
European Indoor Championships
Gold medal – first place	1996 Stockholm	Triple jump

Māris Bružiks (born 25 August 1962) is a retired triple jumper who represented the USSR, and later, following its dissolution, Latvia.

He first won the European Athletics Indoor Championships in 1986, setting a championship record (CR) with 17.54 metres. The record stood until 2011, when it was broken by Teddy Tamgho of France, who set a world record of 17.92 m. Outdoor Bružiks reached 17.56 metres, in September 1988.

== Achievements ==
Year	Competition	Venue	Position	Event	Notes
Representing the Soviet Union
1986	European Indoor Championships	Madrid, Spain	1st	Triple jump	17.54 m =CR
1986	European Championships	Stuttgart, West Germany	2nd	Triple jump	17.33 m (wind: +1.1 m/s)
1987	Universiade	Zagreb, Yugoslavia	3rd	Triple jump	16.90 m
Representing Latvia
1992	European Indoor Championships	Genoa, Italy	4th	Triple jump	16.97 m
1992	Olympic Games	Barcelona, Spain	10th	Triple jump	16.80 m
1993	World Indoor Championships	Toronto, Canada	2nd	Triple jump	17.36 m
1994	European Championships	Helsinki, Finland	3rd	Triple jump	17.20 m (wind: +0.7 m/s)
1995	World Championships	Gothenburg, Sweden	10th	Triple jump	16.80 m
1996	European Indoor Championships	Stockholm, Sweden	1st	Triple jump	16.97 m
