= Konstadinos Zalagitis =

Greek triple jumper (born 1980)

Konstadinos ("Kostas") Zalagitis (Greek: Κωνσταντίνος "Κώστας" Ζαλαγκίτης, born 13 December 1980) is a retired Greek triple jumper. He was born in Trikala.

He finished twelfth at the 2001 World Championships and eighth at the 2002 European Championships. He also competed at the 2000 Olympic Games and the 2005 World Championships without reaching the finals.

His personal best jump is 17.43 metres, achieved in June 2002 in Chania. In Greece only Dimitrios Tsiamis has a longer jump.

== Competition record ==
Year	Competition	Venue	Position	Notes
Representing Greece
1998	World Junior Championships	Annecy, France	27th (q)	15.21 m (wind: +1.0 m/s)
2000	European Indoor Championships	Ghent, Belgium	10th (q)	16.44 m
2000	Olympic Games	Sydney, Australia	37th (q)	14.15 m
2001	European U23 Championships	Amsterdam, Netherlands	4th	16.80 m (wind: -0.5 m/s)
2001	World Championships	Edmonton, Canada	12th	16.13 m
2002	European Championships	Munich, Germany	8th	16.62 m
2005	European Indoor Championships	Madrid, Spain	16th (q)	15.75 m
2005	World Championships	Helsinki, Finland	27th (q)	15.72 m
2006	European Championships	Gothenburg, Sweden	–	NM
2007	World Championships	Osaka, Japan	28th (q)	16.26 m
