= Avi Tayari =

Israeli triple jumper

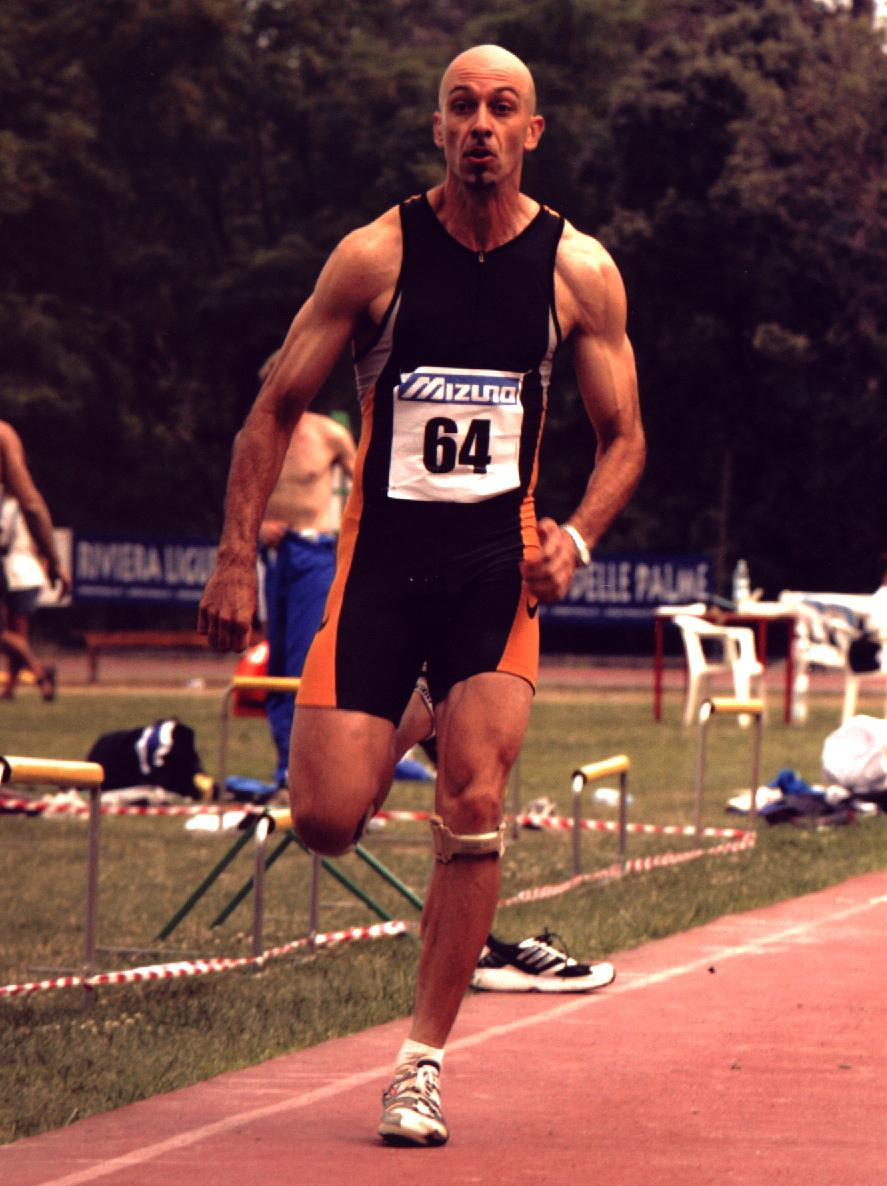

Personal information
- Born: 25 October 1973 (age 53)

Sport
- Sport: Track and field

Avraham "Avi" Tayari (Hebrew: אברהם "אבי" טיירי; born 25 October 1973) is a retired Israeli triple jumper. His personal best jump was 16.94 metres, achieved in May 1997 in Tel Aviv.

He competed at the 1992 World Junior Championships, the 1997 World Championships, the 1998 European Championships, the 2001 World Championships and the 2002 European Championships without reaching the final.

== Achievements ==
Year	Competition	Venue	Position	Event	Notes
Representing Israel
1991	European Junior Championships	Thessaloniki, Greece	10th	Triple jump	15.14 m
1992	World Junior Championships	Seoul, South Korea	22nd (q)	Triple jump	15.14 m
1997	World Championships	Athens, Greece	23rd (q)	Triple jump	16.45 m
1998	European Championships	Budapest, Hungary	18th (q)	Triple jump	16.26 m
1999	Universiade	Palma de Mallorca, Spain	11th	Triple jump	15.79 m
2001	World Championships	Edmonton, Canada	22nd (q)	Triple jump	16.06 m
2002	European Championships	Munich, Germany	20th (q)	Triple jump	15.94 m

== See also ==
- Sports in Israel
