= Jonathan Edwards (triple jumper) =

English triple jumper (born 1966)

Jonathan Edwards CBE
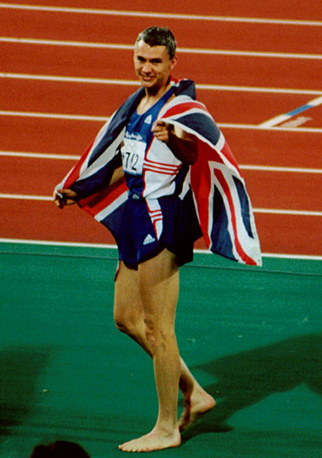
- Edwards at the Sydney Olympics, 2000

Personal information
- Full name: Jonathan David Edwards
- Nationality: British
- Born: 10 May 1966 (age 60) Westminster, London, England
- Education: West Buckland School; Van Mildert College, Durham
- Height: 182 cm (6 ft 0 in)
- Weight: 71 kg (157 lb)

Sport
- Sport: Athletics
- Club: Gateshead Harriers
Medal record
Men's athletics
Representing Great Britain
Event	1st	2nd	3rd
Olympic Games	1	1	0
World Championships	2	1	2
World Indoor Championships	0	1	0
European Championships	1	0	1
European Indoor Championships	1	0	0
Commonwealth Games	1	2	0
Total	6	5	3
Olympic Games
Gold medal – first place	2000 Sydney	Triple jump
Silver medal – second place	1996 Atlanta	Triple jump
World Championships
Gold medal – first place	1995 Gothenburg	Triple jump
Gold medal – first place	2001 Edmonton	Triple jump
Silver medal – second place	1997 Athens	Triple jump
Bronze medal – third place	1993 Stuttgart	Triple jump
Bronze medal – third place	1999 Seville	Triple jump
World Indoor Championships
Silver medal – second place	2001 Lisbon	Triple jump
Goodwill Games
Gold medal – first place	1998 New York	Triple jump
Gold medal – first place	2001 Brisbane	Triple jump
European Championships
Gold medal – first place	1998 Budapest	Triple jump
Bronze medal – third place	2002 Munich	Triple jump
European Indoor Championships
Gold medal – first place	1998 Valencia	Triple jump
Representing England
Commonwealth Games
Gold medal – first place	2002 Manchester	Triple jump
Silver medal – second place	1990 Auckland	Triple jump
Silver medal – second place	1994 Victoria	Triple jump

Jonathan David Edwards (born 10 May 1966) is an English former triple jumper. He is an Olympic, double World, European, European indoor and Commonwealth champion, and has held the world record in the event since 1995. Edwards is widely regarded as one of the greatest triple-jumpers in history.

Following his retirement as an athlete, Edwards has worked as a sports (primarily athletics) commentator and presenter for BBC television, before moving to Eurosport. In 2011, he was elected President of the Wenlock Olympian Society. He was a member of the London Organising Committee of the Olympic and Paralympic Games for the 2012 games.

== Early life ==
Edwards was born in Westminster, London, and attended West Buckland School in Devon where his potential for the triple jump was spotted at an early age. He was a strong all-rounder, and on leaving received the school's top award for sporting and academic excellence, the Fortescue Medal.

Contemporaries with Edwards at West Buckland School included Victor Ubogu and Steve Ojomoh, both former Bath and England Rugby international players. Edwards now has a Sports Hall at West Buckland named after him, The Jonathan Edwards Sports Centre. Edwards then studied physics at Durham University, attending Van Mildert College.

== Athletics career ==
Because of his strong Christian beliefs during his athletic career, discussed in more detail below, he initially refused to compete on Sundays, but eventually decided to do so in 1993. This decision proved timely, since the qualifying round at that year's World Championships took place on a Sunday. He went on to win the bronze medal.

In his breakthrough year of 1995, Edwards produced a jump of 18.43 m (60 feet 5 1/2 inches) at the European Cup, in Villeneuve d'Asq, France, on 25 June 1995. The leap was wind assisted (+2.4 m/s) and did not count for record purposes and was followed by a 18.39 m jump a few minutes after (+2.4 m/s again). This was a sign of things to come as he capped an unbeaten year with a historic gold medal performance at the World Championships, in which he broke the world record twice in the same meeting. On his first jump, he became the first man to legally pass the 18-metre barrier with a jump of 18.16 m (59 feet 7 inches). That record lasted for about 20 minutes. His second jump of 18.29 m made him the first to jump 60 feet. During his commentary for the 2008 Summer Olympics, Edwards observed that during the 1995 World Championships, he felt as if "he could jump as far as he needed to". Later that same year, Edwards became the BBC Sports Personality of the Year.

During 1996 Edwards went into the 1996 Summer Olympics as favourite and world record holder, but it was American Kenny Harrison who took the gold with a jump of 18.09 m. Edwards walked away with the silver after a leap of 17.88 m (the longest ever jump not to win gold). Edwards won the gold medal at the 2000 Summer Olympics, and was appointed a CBE shortly thereafter. He also won golds at the 2001 World Championships and 2002 Commonwealth Games. At one point in 2002, Edwards held all the gold medals for the "four majors" (Olympic Games, World Championships, Commonwealth Games and European Championships). He retired after the 2003 World Championships.

== Post-athletics career ==
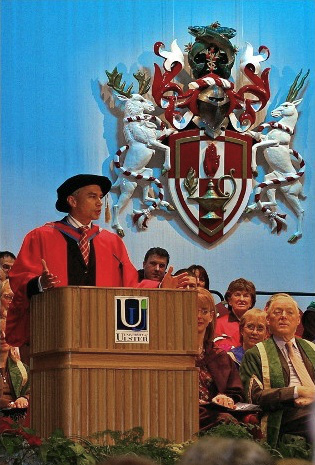
Jonathan Edwards at the University of Ulster Winter Graduation Ceremony, Tuesday, 19 December 2006

Following his retirement, Edwards has pursued a media career as a television presenter mainly working for the BBC as a sports commentator and presenter, and on programmes such as Songs of Praise until he gave up this programme, due to his loss of faith, in February 2007.

Edwards regularly presented BBC coverage of athletics. When he is not presenting coverage, Edwards often provided expert analysis on field events as part of the BBC commentary team. For the London 2012 Olympics, Edwards anchored the BBC's coverage of the athletics events.

After retiring from competition, Edwards became a keen recreational cyclist and has presented the BBC's coverage of cycle racing since 2012. He also covered the 2014 Winter Olympics for the BBC and the 2014 Winter Paralympics for Channel 4.

Edwards also served as a presenter for the Olympic Announcement ceremonies during the IOC sessions in Guatemala in 2007 and Copenhagen in 2009.

In 2004, Edwards joined with Paula Radcliffe on an Olympic Special Who Wants to Be a Millionaire?. The pair raised £64,000 for charity with half of that sum going to the British Olympic Association and a quarter of the sum going to Asthma UK.

In 2011, Edwards became President of Wenlock Olympian Society, organisers of the annual Wenlock Olympian Games held in Shropshire.

He was a member of the London Organising Committee of the Olympic and Paralympic Games, representing athletes in the organisation of the 2012 Summer Olympics.

In February 2016, after 13 years with the BBC, Edwards announced that he had agreed to join Eurosport on an exclusive contract as the channel's lead presenter from 2017, although he would continue working for the BBC and Channel 4 on their coverage of the 2016 Summer Olympics and Paralympics alongside duties with Eurosport until the end of 2016, with his first anchoring role for the pay TV channel being the 2016 European Aquatics Championships in May in London. For the BBC's Olympic coverage in Rio, Edwards was a lead presenter on BBC Radio 5 Live and presented the television coverage of triathlon events.

== International competitions ==
Year	Competition	Venue	Position	Event	Result
Representing Great Britain and England
1987	Universiade	Zagreb, Yugoslavia	9th	Triple jump	15.96 m
1988	Olympic Games	Seoul, South Korea	23rd (q)	Triple jump	15.88 m
1989	World Cup	Barcelona, Spain	3rd	Triple jump	17.28 m
1990	Commonwealth Games	Auckland, New Zealand	2nd	Triple jump	16.93 m (w)
1992	Olympic Games	Barcelona, Spain	35th (q)	Triple jump	15.76 m
1992	World Cup	Havana, Cuba	1st	Triple jump	17.34 m
1993	World Indoor Championships	Toronto, Canada	6th	Triple jump	16.76 m
1993	World Championships	Stuttgart, Germany	3rd	Triple jump	17.44 m
1994	Goodwill Games	Saint Petersburg, Russia	7th	Triple jump	16.57 m
1994	European Championships	Helsinki, Finland	6th	Triple jump	16.85 m
1994	Commonwealth Games	Victoria, Canada	2nd	Triple jump	17.00 m
1995	World Championships	Gothenburg, Sweden	1st	Triple jump	18.29 m
1996	Olympic Games	Atlanta, United States	2nd	Triple jump	17.88 m
1997	World Championships	Athens, Greece	2nd	Triple jump	17.69 m
1998	European Indoor Championships	Valencia, Spain	1st	Triple jump	17.43 m
1998	Goodwill Games	Uniondale, United States	1st	Triple jump	17.65 m
1998	European Championships	Budapest, Hungary	1st	Triple jump	17.99 m
1999	World Championships	Seville, Spain	3rd	Triple jump	17.48 m
2000	Olympic Games	Sydney, Australia	1st	Triple jump	17.71 m
2001	World Indoor Championships	Lisbon, Portugal	2nd	Triple jump	17.26 m
2001	World Championships	Edmonton, Canada	1st	Triple jump	17.92 m
2001	Goodwill Games	Brisbane, Australia	1st	Triple jump	17.26 m
2002	Commonwealth Games	Manchester, United Kingdom	1st	Triple jump	17.86 m
2002	European Championships	Munich, Germany	3rd	Triple jump	17.32 m
2002	World Cup	Madrid, Spain	1st	Triple jump	17.34 m
2003	World Indoor Championships	Birmingham, United Kingdom	4th	Triple jump	17.19 m
2003	World Championships	Paris, France	12th	Triple jump	16.31 m

== Personal bests ==
- Triple Jump – 18.29 m (60.0 ft) (WR), 18.43 m (60.5 ft) (w +2.4 m/s (5.4 mph)) (not ratified due to excessive wind conditions)
- 100 m – 10.48 s
- Long jump – 7.41 m (24.3 ft) m

== Awards ==
Edwards received an honorary doctorate from Heriot-Watt University in 2002.

An honorary doctorate was conferred upon him at a ceremony at the University of Exeter on 21 January 2006.

Later in the same year, an honorary doctorate of the university (DUniv) was conferred upon him at the winter graduation ceremony of the University of Ulster (19 December 2006).

== Personal life ==
Edwards lives with his wife in Newcastle upon Tyne. They have two sons.

Edwards was one of 200 public figures who were signatories to a letter to The Guardian opposing Scottish independence in the run-up to the 2014 referendum on that issue.

=== Religious beliefs ===
Edwards initially refused to compete on Sundays due to his devout Christian beliefs, a decision that cost him a chance to compete in the 1991 World Championships. However, in 1993, after much deliberation and discussion with his father (a vicar), he changed his mind, deciding that God gave him his talent in order for him to compete in athletics. He once said "My relationship with Jesus and God is fundamental to everything I do. I have made a commitment and dedication in that relationship to serve God in every area of my life."

He presented episodes of the Christian television show Songs of Praise until 2007. In June 2007, in an interview in The Times, Edwards said: "When you think about it rationally, it does seem incredibly improbable that there is a God." In the same interview, he stated: "Looking back now, I can see that my faith was not only pivotal to my decision to take up sport but also my success ... I was always dismissive of sports psychology when I was competing, but I now realise that my belief in God was sports psychology in all but name." He has since described himself as "probably agnostic, but practically an atheist", and has expressed contentment with his current worldview, stating "I feel internally happier than at any time of my life."

Records
Preceded by (United States) Willie Banks	Men's Triple Jump World Record Holder; 8 July 1995 – present	Incumbent
Awards and achievements
Preceded by Damon Hill	BBC Sports Personality of the Year; 1995	Succeeded by Damon Hill
Preceded by Colin Jackson	Men's European Athlete of the Year; 1995	Succeeded by Jan Železný
Preceded by Wilson Kipketer	Men's European Athlete of the Year; 1998	Succeeded by Tomáš Dvořák
Preceded by Romario	L'Équipe's International Champion of Champions; 1995	Succeeded by Michael Johnson
Preceded by Johan Olav Koss	United Press International; Athlete of the Year; 1995	Succeeded by none
