= Denis Kapustin (athlete) =

Russian triple jumper

Personal information
- Native name: Денис Викторович Капустин
- Full name: Denis Viktorovich Kapustin
- Born: 5 October 1970 (age 55) Kazan, Tatarstan ASSR, Russian SFSR, Soviet Union
Medal record
Men's athletics
Representing Russia
European Championships
Gold medal – first place	1994 Helsinki	Triple jump
Silver medal – second place	1998 Budapest	Triple jump

Denis Viktorovich Kapustin (Russian: Денис Викторович Капустин; born 5 October 1970) is a retired male triple jumper from Russia. Best known for winning the bronze medal at the 2000 Summer Olympics, he is also the 1994 European champion. His personal best jump is 17.65 metres, which he achieved in 1998.

== International competitions ==
Year	Competition	Venue	Position	Event	Notes
Representing the Soviet Union
1989	European Junior Championships	Varaždin, Yugoslavia	1st	Triple jump	16.63 m
1991	Universiade	Sheffield, United Kingdom	4th	Triple jump	16.68 m
Representing Russia
1993	World Championships	Stuttgart, Germany	6th	Triple jump	17.19 m
1994	European Indoor Championships	Paris, France	2nd	Triple jump	17.35 m
1994	European Championships	Helsinki, Finland	1st	Triple jump	17.62 m
1997	World Championships	Athens, Greece	4th	Triple jump	17.59 m
1998	European Championships	Budapest, Hungary	2nd	Triple jump	17.45 m
1999	World Championships	Seville, Spain	9th	Triple jump	16.89 m
2000	Olympic Games	Sydney, Australia	3rd	Triple jump	17.46 m
