= Nikolay Raev =

Bulgarian triple jumper

Nikolay Petrov Raev (Bulgarian: Николай Петров Раев, born 29 January 1971) is a retired Bulgarian triple jumper.

He was born in Ruse, and represented the club Lokomotiv Ruse. He won the bronze medal at the 1990 World Junior Championships and finished twelfth at the 1991 World Indoor Championships and sixth at the 1992 European Indoor Championships. At the 1992 Olympic Games he did not reach the final. He won the bronze medal at the 1993 World Indoor Championships, but was disqualified for a doping offense.

After the doping ban he competed at the 1997 World Championships and the 1998 European Championships without reaching the final. He finished twelfth at the 1998 European Indoor Championships. He became Bulgarian champion in 1997 and 1998, and Bulgarian indoor champion in 1991, 1993, 1998 and 2001.

His personal best jump was 17.18 metres, achieved in May 1998 in Sofia.
