= Paolo Camossi =

Italian coach and triple jumper (born 1973)

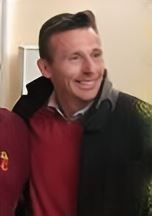
- Camossi in 2018

Personal information
- National team: Italy
- Born: 6 January 1974 (age 52) Gorizia, Italy
- Height: 1.76 m (5 ft 9 in)
- Weight: 72 kg (159 lb)

Sport
- Sport: Athletics
- Event: Triple jumper
- Club: G.S. Fiamme Azzurre
- Coached by: Giancarlo Medesani

Achievements and titles
- Personal bests: Triple jump: 17.45 m (2000); Long Jump: 8.16 m (1998)
Medal record
Men's athletics
Representing Italy
Event	1st	2nd	3rd
World Indoor Championships	1	0	0
European Indoor Championships	0	0	1
Mediterranean Games	1	0	0
Military World Games	0	1	0
Total	2	1	1
World Indoor Championships
Gold medal – first place	2001 Lisbon	Triple Jump
European Indoor Championships
Bronze medal – third place	2000 Ghent	Triple Jump
Mediterranean Games
Gold medal – first place	1997 Bari	Triple Jump
Military World Games
Silver medal – second place	1999 Zagreb	Triple Jump

Paolo Camossi (born 6 January 1974) is an Italian coach and former triple jumper, best known for his gold medal at the 2001 World Indoor Championships.

From September 2015 he is the coach of Marcell Jacobs.

== Biography ==
Paolo Camossi won four medals, at senior level, at the International athletics competitions. He participated at one edition of the Summer Olympics (2000), he has 19 caps in national team from 1995 to 2006. His personal best was 17.45 metres, achieved in June 2000 in Milan. This result places him third on the all-time Italian performers list, behind Fabrizio Donato.

== Statistics ==
=== Achievements ===
Year	Competition	Venue	Position	Event	Notes
1997	Mediterranean Games	Bari, Italy	1st	Triple jump	16.63 m
1998	European Championships	Budapest, Hungary	7th	Long jump	7.98 m
1998	European Championships	Budapest, Hungary	19th	Triple jump	16.24 m
1999	World Championships	Seville, Spain	5th	Triple jump	17.29 m
2000	European Indoor Championships	Ghent, Belgium	3rd	Triple jump	17.05 m NR
2000	Olympic Games	Sydney, Australia	8th	Triple jump	16.96 m
2001	World Indoor Championships	Lisbon, Portugal	1st	Triple jump	17.32 m NR
2001	World Championships	Edmonton, Canada	11th	Triple jump	

=== National titles ===
He has won 9 times the individual national championship.

- 7 wins in the triple jump (1996, 1997, 1998, 1999, 2001, 2003, 2005)
- 2 wins in the triple jump indoor (1996, 2000)

== Palmares as coach of Marcell Jacobs ==
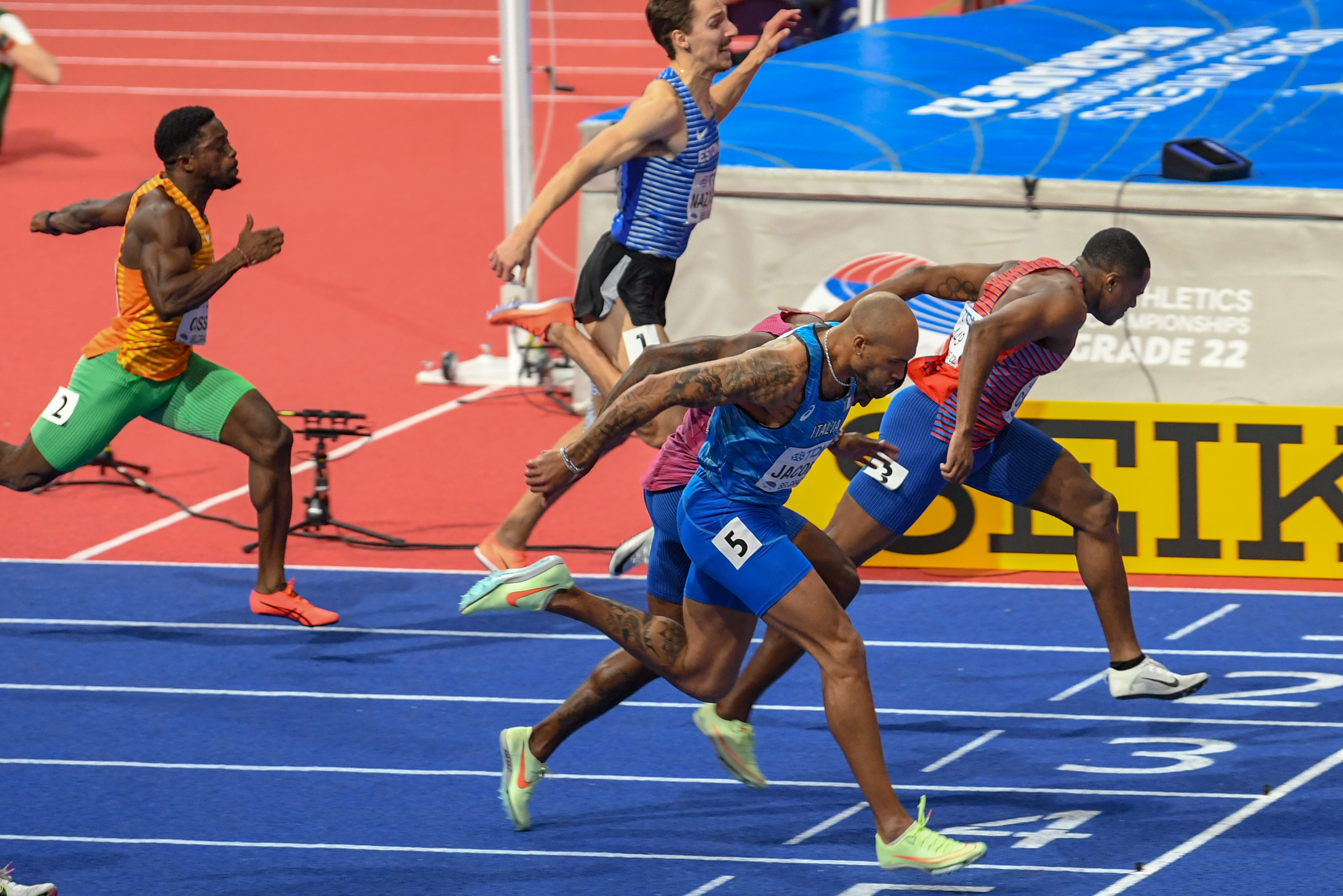
The triumph of Marcell Jacobs in the 60 m final at the 2022 World Athletics Indoor Championships held in Belgrade, Serbia.

The meeting with Marcell Jacobs takes place in 2015, when Marcell is only 21 years old, from September of that same year he officially becomes his coach.

Year	Competition	Venue	Position	Event	Performance	Notes
2016	Mediterranean U23 Championships	(Tunisia) Tunis	1st	Long jump	7.95 m	PB
2016	European Championships	(Netherlands) Amsterdam	11th	Long jump	7.59 m	
2017	European Indoor Championships	(Serbia) Belgrade	Qual.	Long jump	7.70 m	
2018	European Championships	(Germany) Berlin	11th (sf)	100 m	10.28	
2019	European Indoor Championships	(United Kingdom) Glasgow	Qual.	Long jump	NM	
2019	IAAF World Relays	(Japan) Yokohama	Final	4 × 100 m relay	DNF	
2019	World Championships	(Qatar) Doha	19th (sf)	100 m	10.20	
2019	World Championships	(Qatar) Doha	10th (sf)	4 × 100 m relay	38.11	NR
2021	European Indoor Championships	(Poland) Toruń	1st	60 m	6.47	WL, NR
2021	World Relays	(Poland) Chorzów	1st	4×100 m relay	39.21	
2021	Olympic Games	(Japan) Tokyo	1st	100 m	9.80	AR
2021	Olympic Games	(Japan) Tokyo	1st	4×100 m relay	37.50	WL, NR
2022	World Indoor Championships	(Serbia) Belgrade	1st	60 m	6.41	WL, AR
2022	World Championships	(United States) Eugene	N/A (sf)	100 m	10.04	DNS
2022	European Championships	(Germany) Munich	1st	100 m	9.95	CR, SB
2023	European Indoor Championships	(Turkey) Istanbul	2nd	60 m	6.50	

== See also ==
- Italian all-time lists - Long jump
- Italian all-time lists - Triple jump
