= Sergey Bochkov =

Azerbaijani triple jumper

Sergey Bochkov (born 20 August 1979) is an Azerbaijani triple jumper.

He finished seventh at the 1998 World Junior Championships. He also competed at the 1999 World Championships, the 2000 Olympic Games, the 2001 World Championships and the 2004 Olympic Games without reaching the final.

His personal best jump is 16.82 metres, achieved in May 2003 in Moscow.
