= Stamatios Lenis =

Greek triple jumper (born 1978)

Personal information
- Nationality: Greek
- Born: 11 October 1978 (age 47)

Sport
- Sport: Athletics
- Event: Triple jump

Stamatios Lenis (born 11 October 1978) is a Greek athlete. He competed in the men's triple jump at the 2000 Summer Olympics.
