= Ketill Hanstveit =

Norwegian triple jumper (born 1973)

Ketill Hanstveit (born 2 November 1973) is a retired male triple jumper from Norway. He represented IL Norna-Salhus. His personal best jump was 17.27 metres, achieved in August 1999 in Byrkjelo. This is the current Norwegian record.

He finished tenth at the 1992 World Junior Championships in Seoul, eighth at the 1996 European Indoor Championships in Stockholm, twelfth at the 1998 European Championships in Budapest and fifth at the 2000 European Indoor Championships in Ghent. Participating at the 2000 Summer Olympics, he did not manage to reach the final. He became Norwegian champion in the years 1992-1994, 1997-1999 and 2001-2002.

== Achievements ==
Year	Competition	Venue	Position	Event	Notes
Representing Norway
1991	European Junior Championships	Thessaloniki, Greece	5th	Triple jump	15.85 m
1992	World Junior Championships	Seoul, South Korea	10th	Triple jump	15.52 m (wind: -1.1 m/s)
1994	European Championships	Helsinki, Finland	17th (q)	Triple jump	15.84 m
1996	European Indoor Championships	Stockholm, Sweden	8th	Triple jump	16.35 m
1997	World Championships	Athens, Greece	22nd (q)	Triple jump	16.45 m
1998	European Indoor Championships	Valencia, Spain	13th (q)	Triple jump	16.46 m
1998	European Championships	Budapest, Hungary	12th	Triple jump	16.58 m
1999	World Championships	Seville, Spain	19th (q)	Triple jump	16.59 m
2000	European Indoor Championships	Ghent, Belgium	5th	Triple jump	16.72 m
2000	Olympic Games	Sydney, Australia	13th (q)	Triple jump	16.75 m
2002	European Indoor Championships	Vienna, Austria	–	Triple jump	NM
