= Larry Achike =

English track and field athlete

Personal information
- Nationality: British (English)
- Born: 31 January 1975 (age 51) Islington, London, England
- Height: 188 cm (6 ft 2 in)
- Weight: 75 kg (165 lb)

Sport
- Sport: Athletics
- Event: Triple jump
- Club: Shaftesbury Barnet Harriers
Medal record
Athletics
Representing England
Commonwealth Games
Gold medal – first place	1998 Kuala Lumpur	triple jump

Onochie Lawrence Achike (born 31 January 1975) is a retired track and field athlete from England who competed at the 2000 Summer Olympics and the 2008 Summer Olympics and won a Commonwealth Games gold medal.

== Biography ==
He was born in Islington, London, and educated at Worth School in Sussex. His was a member of Shaftesbury Barnet Harriers in North London.

A former rugby player, Achike eventually specialised in triple jump and represented England, winning the gold medal at the 1998 Commonwealth Games.

At the 2000 Olympic Games in Sydney, he represented Great Britain and placed fifth in the triple jump, setting a new personal best of 17.30 metres during the contest.

He competed at the 2006 European Championships, but failed to qualify for the final. At the 2008 Olympic Games in Beijing, he represented Great Britain again and finished seventh in the triple jump, with a 17.17 m jump.

Achike was a four-times British triple jump champion after winning the British AAA Championships title in 1999 and 2003 and the British Athletics Championships in 2011 and 2012.

== International competitions ==
Year	Competition	Venue	Position	Event	Notes
Representing Great Britain and England
1992	World Junior Championships	Seoul, South Korea	11th	Triple jump	15.33 m (wind: -0.2 m/s)
1994	World Junior Championships	Lisbon, Portugal	1st	Triple jump	16.67 m w (wind: +2.4 m/s)
1998	European Championships	Budapest, Hungary	21st (q)	Triple jump	16.13 m
1998	Commonwealth Games	Kuala Lumpur, Malaysia	1st	Triple jump	17.10 m
2000	Olympic Games	Sydney, Australia	5th	Triple jump	17.29 m
2001	Goodwill Games	Brisbane, Australia	5th	Triple jump	16.36 m
2006	European Championships	Gothenburg, Sweden	14th (q)	Triple jump	16.68 m
2008	Olympic Games	Beijing, China	7th	Triple Jump	17.17 m
2010	Commonwealth Games	Delhi, India	7th	Triple jump	16.59 m

Family Olivia Achike, Sarah Achike, Ella Achike, Ruben Achike.
