= Vasiliy Sokov =

Athletics competitor

Vasiliy Viktorovich (or Dmitriyevich) Sokov (Russian: Василий Викторович (Дмитриевич) Соков; born 7 April 1968 in Dushanbe, Tajik SSR) is a triple jumper who represented the USSR and later Russia.

He is best known for his two bronze medals at the European Indoor Championships. His personal best was 17.59 metres, achieved in June 1993 in Moscow. His wife, Mariya Sokova, is also an athlete. Sokov represented Uzbekistan at the 2001 World Championships in Athletics.

== Anti-doping rule violation ==
Sokov received a three months doping ban for the use of ephedrine in 1995.

He has continued to jump, winning the bronze medal in a Russian sweep of the M45 division at the 2015 World Masters Athletics Championships. His wife did one place better in the W40 division.

== International competitions ==
| Year | Competition | Venue | Position | Event | Notes |
Representing Soviet Union
| 1991 | World Championships | Tokyo, Japan | 4th | Triple jump | 17.28 m |
Representing Unified Team
| 1992 | European Indoor Championships | Genoa, Italy | 3rd | Triple jump | 17.01 m |
| 1992 | Olympic Games | Barcelona, Spain | 9th | Triple jump | 16.86 m |
Representing Russia
| 1994 | European Indoor Championships | Paris, France | 3rd | Triple jump | 17.31 m |
| 1994 | European Championships | Helsinki, Finland | 4th | Triple jump | 16.97 m |
| 1996 | Olympic Games | Atlanta, United States | 16th | Triple jump | 16.68 m |
| 1998 | European Championships | Budapest, Hungary | 5th | Triple jump | 17.16 m |
| 1999 | World Championships | Seville, Spain | 12th | Triple jump | 16.53 m |

== See also ==
- List of doping cases in athletics
