= Andrew Murphy =

Australian triple jumper

Andrew Ray-Jamie Murphy (born 18 December 1969 in Melbourne, Victoria) is an Australian former triple jumper, best known for his bronze medal at the 2001 World Indoor Championships where he achieved an Oceanian indoor record of 17.20 metres.

His personal best is 17.32 metres, achieved at the 1999 World Championships in Seville. This ranks him second among Australian triple jumpers, only behind Ken Lorraway.

His coach was Keith Connor. He is married to Elizabeth Lindwall (Murphy) and they have five children - Connor, Finn, Indiana, Takoda and Siena.

He currently works at Trinity Grammar School, Summer Hill as the Director of Track and Field where he has achieved many athletes winning national medals, including his oldest son, Connor.

Murphy coaches triple jumper Desleigh Owusu, as well as Rohan Browning, the first Australian in 17 years to compete in an Olympic men's 100 meters semi final. At the 2020 Olympics in Tokyo, Browning ran the 2nd fastest 100 meters ever by an Australian. Rohan also obtained a very high ATAR of 99+ at Trinity Grammar, and is considered an all-rounder student.

== International competitions ==
Year	Competition	Venue	Position	Notes
Representing Australia
1988	World Junior Championships	Sudbury, Canada	10th	15.24 m (wind: +0.3 m/s)
1990	Commonwealth Games	Auckland, New Zealand	6th	16.57 m
1994	Commonwealth Games	Victoria, Canada	10th	15.83 m
1996	Olympic Games	Atlanta, United States	34th (q)	16.00 m
1997	World Indoor Championships	Paris, France	5th	16.96 m
1999	World Championships	Seville, Spain	4th	17.32 m = PB
2000	Olympic Games	Sydney, Australia	10th	16.80 m
2001	World Indoor Championships	Lisbon, Portugal	3rd	17.20 m (=AR)
2002	Commonwealth Games	Manchester, United Kingdom	7th	16.37 m
2004	Olympic Games	Athens, Greece	14th (q)	16.84m
2006	Commonwealth Games	Melbourne, Australia	4th	16.70 m

MIC of Track and Field at Trinity Grammar School
