= Zsolt Czingler =

Hungarian triple jumper

Personal information
- Born: 28 April 1971 (age 55) Budapest, Hungary

Sport
- Sport: Track and field
Medal record
Representing Hungary
World Indoor Championships
Bronze medal – third place	1999 Maebashi	Triple jump

Zsolt Czingler (born 28 April 1971) is a retired Hungarian triple jumper, whose personal best was 17.24 metres, achieved in May 1998 in Tivoli.

== Achievements ==
Year	Competition	Venue	Position	Event	Notes
Representing Hungary
1990	World Junior Championships	Plovdiv, Bulgaria	10th	Triple jump	15.61 m (-1.0 m/s)
1994	European Championships	Helsinki, Finland	11th	Triple jump	16.21 m (+0.7 m/s)
1996	Olympic Games	Atlanta, United States	24th (q)	Triple jump	16.35 m
1997	Universiade	Catania, Italy	12th	Triple jump	15.92 m
1998	European Indoor Championships	Ghent, Belgium	9th	Triple jump	16.56 m
1998	European Championships	Budapest, Hungary	7th	Triple jump	17.03 m
1999	World Indoor Championships	Maebas, Japan	3rd	Triple jump	16.98 m
2000	European Indoor Championships	Ghent, Belgium	4th	Triple jump	17.00 m
2000	Olympic Games	Sydney, Australia	18th (q)	Triple jump	16.52 m
