= Zoran Đurđević =

Serbian triple jumper

Personal information
- Nationality: Serbian
- Born: 3 April 1968 (age 58) Frankfurt, West Germany
- Home town: Belgrade, Serbia

Sport
- Sport: Athletics
- Event: Triple jump

Zoran Đurđević (born 3 April 1968 in Frankfurt) is a Serbian athlete. He was a member of AK Crvena Zvezda and represented his country at international competitions.

He made his international debut at the Athletics at the 1989 Summer Universiade. He participated at among others the 1990 European Athletics Championships, 1992 European Athletics Indoor Championships, 1995 Summer Universiade, 1998 European Athletics Championships, 1997 World Championships in Athletics and 1999 World Championships in Athletics. He competed in the men's triple jump at the 2000 Summer Olympics, representing Yugoslavia.
