= Rostislav Dimitrov =

Bulgarian triple jumper

Medal record

Men's athletics

Representing Bulgaria

European Championships
Bronze medal – third place	1998 Budapest	Triple jump

Rostislav Dimitrov (Bulgarian: Ростислав Димитров; born 26 December 1974 in Rousse) is a former triple jumper from Bulgaria, best known for his silver medal at the 1999 World Championships. He originally won the silver medal at the World Indoor Championships the same year, but was disqualified for ephedrin use. His personal best was 17.49 metres.

== Achievements ==
Year	Competition	Venue	Position	Event	Notes
Representing Bulgaria
1992	World Junior Championships	Seoul, South Korea	10th (q)	Triple jump	15.22 m (wind: -0.6 m/s)
1998	European Championships	Budapest, Hungary	3rd	Triple jump	17.26 m
1999	World Indoor Championships	Maebashi, Japan	DQ (2nd)	Triple jump	
1999	World Championships	Seville, Spain	2nd	Triple jump	17.49 m
2000	European Indoor Championships	Ghent, Belgium	2nd	Triple jump	17.22 m
2000	Olympic Games	Sydney, Australia	9th	Triple jump	16.95 m
2000	IAAF Grand Prix Final	Doha, UAE	2nd	Triple jump	17.11 m
2002	European Indoor Championships	Vienna, Austria	5th	Triple jump	16.79 m
2002	European Championships	Munich, Germany	9th	Triple jump	16.57 m
