= 2006 IAAF World Indoor Championships – Men's triple jump =

The Men's triple jump event at the 2006 IAAF World Indoor Championships was held on March 11–12.

== Medalists ==
Gold	Silver	Bronze
Walter Davis; United States	Jadel Gregório; Brazil	Yoandris Betanzos; Cuba

== Results ==
=== Qualification ===
Qualifying perf. 16.95 (Q) or 8 best performers (q) advanced to the Final.

Rank	Group	Athlete	Nationality	#1	#2	#3	Result	Notes
1	A	Jadel Gregório	Brazil	X	17.46		17.46	Q, AR
2	B	Igor Spasovkhodskiy	Russia	16.84	17.31		17.31	Q, PB
3	A	Marian Oprea	Romania	17.25			17.25	Q
4	A	Yoandris Betanzos	Cuba	16.57	17.22		17.22	Q, SB
5	A	Nelson Évora	Portugal	17.11			17.11	Q
6	A	Walter Davis	United States	16.93	16.67	17.09	17.09	Q
7	B	Nathan Douglas	Great Britain	16.73	17.01		17.01	Q, PB
8	A	Dimitrios Tsiamis	Greece	16.95			16.95	Q
8	B	Momchil Karailiev	Bulgaria	X	16.95		16.95	Q
10	A	Viktor Yastrebov	Ukraine	16.47	X	16.89	16.89	SB
11	B	Allen Simms	Puerto Rico	16.82	16.36	16.66	16.82	NR
12	B	Karl Taillepierre	France	X	16.80	16.41	16.80	
13	A	Viktor Gushchinskiy	Russia	16.50	X	16.63	16.63	
14	B	Aarik Wilson	United States	16.61	X	X	16.61	SB
15	A	Colomba Fofana	France	X	16.58	X	16.58	
16	B	Jefferson Sabino	Brazil	16.22	X	16.55	16.55	
17	A	Fabrizio Donato	Italy	16.35	X	X	16.35	
18	B	Anders Møller	Denmark	16.25	X	16.21	16.25	
19	A	Christopher Hercules	Trinidad and Tobago	X	16.25	16.07	16.25	
20	B	Li Yanxi	China	15.90	15.67	16.13	16.13	
21	A	Kim Deokhyeon	South Korea	15.83	15.83	15.99	15.99	NR
22	B	Paolo Camossi	Italy	15.96	X	X	15.96	
23	B	Dmitrij Valukevic	Slovakia	15.92	X	X	15.92	
	A	Leevan Sands	Bahamas				DNS	
	B	Randy Lewis	Grenada				DNS	

=== Final ===
Rank	Athlete	Nationality	#1	#2	#3	#4	#5	#6	Result	Notes
1st place, gold medalist(s)	Walter Davis	United States	17.73	15.43	17.42	15.86	X	–	17.73	PB
2nd place, silver medalist(s)	Jadel Gregório	Brazil	X	17.56	17.30	X	X	17.13	17.56	AR
3rd place, bronze medalist(s)	Yoandris Betanzos	Cuba	17.17	X	X	17.42	X	14.90	17.42	PB
4	Marian Oprea	Romania	17.22	17.01	16.79	17.23	17.34	17.32	17.34	
5	Igor Spasovkhodskiy	Russia	17.03	17.25	17.01	16.82	17.16	16.78	17.25	
6	Nelson Évora	Portugal	17.14	15.32	X	16.72	X	16.12	17.14	
7	Nathan Douglas	Great Britain	17.05	16.79	15.55	15.17	–	X	17.05	PB
8	Dimitrios Tsiamis	Greece	16.76	16.94	X	–	X	X	16.94	
9	Momchil Karailiev	Bulgaria	16.87	X	16.63				16.87	
