= Athletics at the 2001 Summer Universiade – Men's triple jump =

The men's triple jump event at the 2001 Summer Universiade was held at the Workers Stadium in Beijing, China on 30–31 August.

== Medalists ==
Gold	Silver	Bronze
Kenta Bell; United States	Marian Oprea; Romania	Jadel Gregório; Brazil

== Results ==
=== Qualification ===
Rank	Group	Athlete	Nationality	Result	Notes
1	B	Jadel Gregório	Brazil	16.84	
2	B	Kenta Bell	United States	16.57	
3	A	Yoandri Betanzos	Cuba	16.55	
4	A	Igor Spasovkhodskiy	Russia	16.45	
5	B	Viktor Gushchinskiy	Russia	16.43	
6	A	Boštjan Šimunič	Slovenia	16.33	
7	A	Marian Oprea	Romania	16.30	
8	B	Lauri Leis	Estonia	16.25	
9	A	Leisner Aragón	Colombia	15.90	
10	B	Bright Ukbama	Nigeria	15.50	
11	A	Timothy Rusan	United States	15.43	
12	B	Berk Tuna	Turkey	15.13	
13	A	Tamba Kortequee	Sierra Leone	14.40	
14	?	Si Kuan Wong	Macau	13.62	

=== Final ===
Rank	Athlete	Nationality	Result	Notes
1st place, gold medalist(s)	Kenta Bell	United States	17.22	
2nd place, silver medalist(s)	Marian Oprea	Romania	17.11	NJR
3rd place, bronze medalist(s)	Jadel Gregório	Brazil	16.92	
4	Igor Spasovkhodskiy	Russia	16.91	
5	Yoandri Betanzos	Cuba	16.86w	
6	Viktor Gushchinskiy	Russia	16.64	
7	Boštjan Šimunič	Slovenia	16.54	
8	Lauri Leis	Estonia	16.19	
9	Timothy Rusan	United States	15.89	
10	Leisner Aragón	Colombia	15.88	
11	Bright Ukbama	Nigeria	15.43	
	Berk Tuna	Turkey	NM	
