= 2003 World Championships in Athletics – Men's triple jump =

These are the official results of the Men's triple jump event at the 2003 World Championships in Paris, France. There were a total number of 24 participating athletes, with the final held on Monday 25 August 2003.

== Medalists ==
Gold	Christian Olsson; Sweden (SWE)
Silver	Yoandri Betanzos; Cuba (CUB)
Bronze	(The Bahamas) Leevan Sands; Bahamas (BAH)

== Schedule ==
- All times are Central European Time (UTC+1)

Qualification Round
Group A	Group B
23.08.2003 – 10:45h	23.08.2003 – 10:45h
Final Round
25.08.2003 – 19:55h

== Abbreviations ==
- All results shown are in metres

Q	automatic qualification
q	qualification by rank
DNS	did not start
NM	no mark
WR	world record
AR	area record
NR	national record
PB	personal best
SB	season best

== Qualification ==
RANK	FINAL	GROUP A
1.	Arnie David Giralt (CUB)	17.31 m
2.	Jonathan Edwards (GBR)	16.94 m
3.	Andrew Owusu (GHA)	16.88 m
4.	Jadel Gregório (BRA)	16.82 m
5.	Leevan Sands (BAH)	16.78 m
6.	Ivaylo Rusenov (BUL)	16.71 m
7.	Aleksandr Glavatskiy (BLR)	16.71 m
8.	Walter Davis (USA)	16.60 m
9.	Marian Oprea (ROU)	16.55 m
10.	Igor Spasovkhodskiy (RUS)	16.45 m
11.	Allen Simms (USA)	16.42 m
12.	Olivier Sanou (BUR)	16.23 m

RANK	FINAL	GROUP B
1.	Christian Olsson (SWE)	17.56 m
2.	Yoandri Betanzos (CUB)	17.03 m
3.	Yoelbi Quesada (CUB)	16.97 m
4.	Kenta Bell (USA)	16.95 m
5.	Christos Meletoglou (GRE)	16.80 m
6.	Fabrizio Donato (ITA)	16.63 m
7.	Julien Kapek (FRA)	16.62 m
8.	Dmitrij Valukevic (BLR)	16.59 m
9.	Takanori Sugibayashi (JPN)	16.53 m
10.	Vitaliy Moskalenko (RUS)	16.52 m
11.	Salem Mouled Al-Ahmadi (KSA)	14.66 m
—	Sergey Bochkov (AZE)	NM

== Final ==
RANK	FINAL	DISTANCE
	Christian Olsson (SWE)	17.72 m
	Yoandri Betanzos (CUB)	17.28 m
	Leevan Sands (BAH)	17.26 m
4.	Arnie David Giralt (CUB)	17.23 m
5.	Jadel Gregório (BRA)	17.11 m
6.	Kenta Bell (USA)	17.08 m
7.	Christos Meletoglou (GRE)	16.92 m
8.	Andrew Owusu (GHA)	16.86 m
9.	Yoelbi Quesada (CUB)	16.84 m
10.	Ivaylo Rusenov (BUL)	16.66 m
11.	Aleksandr Glavatskiy (BLR)	16.40 m
12.	Jonathan Edwards (GBR)	16.31 m

== See also ==
- Athletics at the 2003 Pan American Games – Men's triple jump
