= 2005 World Championships in Athletics – Men's triple jump =

The Men's Triple Jump event at the 2005 World Championships in Athletics was held at the Helsinki Olympic Stadium on August 10 and August 11.

== Medalists ==
Gold	Walter Davis; United States (USA)
Silver	Yoandri Betanzos; Cuba (CUB)
Bronze	Marian Oprea; Romania (ROM)

== Qualification ==
=== Group A ===
1. Yoandri Betanzos, Cuba 17.40m Q
2. Leevan Sands, Bahamas 17.21m Q (SB)
3. Walter Davis, United States 17.08m Q
4. Marian Oprea, Romania 16.81m q
5. Anders Møller, Denmark 16.69m q
6. Dmitriy Valyukevich, Slovakia 16.68m q
7. Karl Taillepierre, France 16.67m q
8. Vyktor Yastrebov, Ukraine 16.66m q
9. Nelson Évora, Portugal 16.60m
10. Viktor Gushchinskiy, Russia 16.39m
11. Danila Burkenaya, Russia 16.35m
12. Kazuyoshi Ishikawa, Japan 16.33m
13. Johan Meriluoto, Finland 16.01m
14. Konstadinos Zalaggitis, Greece 15.72m
- Michael Velter, Belgium NM

=== Group B ===
1. Jadel Gregório, Brazil 17.20m Q
2. Momchil Karailiev, Bulgaria 16.73m q
3. Kenta Bell, United States 16.72m q
4. Arnie David Giralt, Cuba 16.71 q
5. Allen Simms, Puerto Rico 16.63m
6. Nathan Douglas, Great Britain 16.53m
7. Igor Spasovkhodskiy, Russia 16.45m
8. Tarik Bougtaïb, Morocco 16.38m
9. Mykola Savolainen, Ukraine 16.35m
10. Hristos Meletoglou, Greece 16.35m
11. Paolo Camossi, Italy 16.23
12. Randy Lewis, Grenada 16.11
13. Charles Friedek, Germany 15.75m
- Yanxi Li, China NM

== Final ==
1. Walter Davis, United States 17.57 m SB
2. Yoandri Betanzos, Cuba 17.42 m SB
3. Marian Oprea, Romania 17.40 m
4. Leevan Sands, Bahamas 17.39 m
5. Karl Taillepierre, France 17.27 m
6. Jadel Gregório, Brazil 17.20 m
7. Kenta Bell, United States 17.11 m SB
8. Arnie David Giralt, Cuba 17.09 m
9. Vyktor Yastrebov, Ukraine 16.90 m
10. Dmitriy Valyukevich, Slovakia 16.79 m
11. Momchil Karailiev, Bulgaria 16.70 m
12. Anders Møller, Denmark 16.16 m
