= Anton Andersson =

Swedish triple jumper

Anton Andersson (born 12 March 1981) is a Swedish triple jumper. He competed at one World Championships and one European Indoor Championships, took three individual Swedish titles outdoors and two indoors.

== Career ==
Andersson hails from Halmstad and represented IFK Halmstad. His "breakthrough" was a competition in Halmstad at the age of 17 when he jumped 7.40 metres in the long jump. An active long jumper during his youth, Andersson achieved a lifetime best of 7.74 metres at the 2000 Swedish U23 championships in Västerås. In the same event, he competed in his first Finland–Sweden International, finishing fifth, and competed at the 2000 World Junior Championships without registering a valid jump. In the triple jump, he took his first national senior medal with a bronze at the 2000 Swedish indoor championships. He then became double Swedish U23 champion in 2001 and won silver at the Swedish championships, the latter in a personal best of 15.92 metres.

Andersson was now coached by Yannick Tregaro in Örgryte IS. He belonged to the training group of eventual Olympic champion Christian Olsson, who was leaner, faster and more technical. Anton Andersson measures 1.94 metres and was more of a power jumper.

In 2002, Andersson broke the 16-metre barrier in the second indoor meet. 16.12 metres in Gothenburg followed by a silver medal in 16.39 at the Swedish indoor championships earned him a ticket to the 2002 European Indoor Championships, where he albeit failed to reach the final. He now competed mostly in the triple jump throughout the year, winning a series of Swedish meets, jumping 16.49 metres at DN Galan, winning his first Swedish championships and finishing second at the Finland–Sweden International.

In 2003 he won national silver medals indoors and outdoors and competed at the 2003 European U23 Championships without reaching the final. Having been injured at the end of 2003, he resumed his ways with an indoor bronze and outdoor gold in 2004, and then a repetition of his 16.49 PB at the Finland–Sweden International where he again finished second. He upgraded to first place at the 2005 edition, when his season's best was 16.43 metres from the 2005 European Cup First League. He missed most of 2006, as well as most of the 2007 indoor season.

Starting the outdoor season in June 2006, Andersson's first results were very modest with 15.81 metres in Bedford and 16.07 in Karlskrona. However, after jumping 16.40 metres in Celle Ligure he mostly stabilized on that level, followed by a wind-assisted (and thus not legal) 16.77 metres in Gavá on 30 June. At the 2007 Swedish championships in Eskilstuna, Andersson shocked the Swedish media as he won the gold in 17.10 metres. This immediately secured him a qualification to the 2007 World Championships. Travelling to Japan, he claimed to have had his longest training jump ever, but at the 2007 World Championships he did not reaching the final round. After the World Championships, Andersson took his only victory at the Finland–Sweden International, but finished lowly at the ISTAF Golden League meet.

Anton Andersson was the fourth Swede to surpass 17 metres, after Arne Holm, Tord Henriksson and Christian Olsson. He was indicted into the Swedish version of the hall of fame, receiving a Stora grabbars märke.

Andersson won the 2008 Swedish indoor championships, but missed the rest of 2008. A similar thing happened in 2009; a silver at the indoor nationals but no no result outdoors. Another indoor gold came in 2010, but Andersson did not surpass 16 metres. He struggled with injuries and therefore changed takeoff foot in 2011. Returning to a 16-metre jump at Världsungdomsspelen, he took bronze at the Swedish championships with 16.21 metres. Following an indoor silver and outdoor bronze in 2012, another season without any 16-metre jumps, a fifth place at the 2013 Swedish indoor championships became his last triple jump competition.

== See also ==
Anton Andersson should not be confused with the hammer thrower who competed at the 2015 European Junior Championships.
