= 2004 IAAF World Outdoor Meetings =

- Edition: 2nd
- Dates: 12 February – 18 September
- Meetings: 34 (+1 final)

The 2004 IAAF World Outdoor Meetings was the second edition of the annual global series of one-day track and field competitions organized by the International Association of Athletics Federations (IAAF). The series had four levels: 2004 IAAF Golden League, IAAF Super Grand Prix, IAAF Grand Prix and IAAF Grand Prix II. There were 6 Golden League meetings, 8 Super Grand Prix category meetings, 9 IAAF Grand Prix category meetings and 11 Grand Prix II meetings, making a combined total of 34 meetings for the series.

The series hosted the same number of meetings as the previous year. The Qatar Athletic Super Grand Prix was added to Super Grand Prix, the Helsinki Grand Prix was dropped from the Grand Prix circuit and the Cena Slovenska - Slovak Gold Grand Prix II meeting was replaced by the Grande Premio Rio de Atletismo. Three meetings changed venue from 2003: the Bislett Games moved from Oslo to Bergen due to stadium developments, the Athens Grand Prix Tsiklitiria was moved from Trikala to Heraklion, and the Brother Znamensky Memorial moved from Tula, Russia to Kazan.

Performances on designated events on the circuit earned athletes points which qualified them for entry to the 2004 IAAF World Athletics Final, held on 18–19 September in Monaco.

== Meetings ==
#	Date	Meeting name	City	Country	Level
1	12 February	Telstra A-Series Melbourne	Melbourne	Australia	IAAF Grand Prix II
2	24 April	Meeting du Conseil General de la Martinique	Fort-de-France	France	IAAF Grand Prix II
3	8 May	Japan Grand Prix	Osaka	Japan	IAAF Grand Prix I
4	14 May	Qatar Athletic Super Grand Prix	Doha	Qatar	IAAF Super Grand Prix
5	16 May	Grande Premio Rio de Atletismo	Rio de Janeiro	Brazil	IAAF Grand Prix II
6	23 May	Grande Premio de Brasil de Atletismo	Belém	Brazil	IAAF Grand Prix I
7	31 May	U.S. Track & Field Open	Palo Alto	United States	IAAF Grand Prix II
8	31 May	THALES FBK-Games	Hengelo	Netherlands	IAAF Grand Prix I
9	2 June	Notturna di Milano	Milan	Italy	IAAF Grand Prix II
10	4 June	Meeting Memorial Primo Nebiolo	Turin	Italy	IAAF Grand Prix II
11	5 June	Adidas Oregon Track Classic	Gresham	United States	IAAF Grand Prix II
12	5 June	Meeting de Atletismo Sevilla	Seville	Spain	IAAF Grand Prix I
13	8 June	Golden Spike Ostrava	Ostrava	Czech Republic	IAAF Super Grand Prix
14	11 June	Bislett Games	Bergen	Norway	2004 IAAF Golden League
15	19 June	Prefontaine Classic	Eugene	United States	IAAF Grand Prix I
16	26 June	Lille Metropole Meeting	Villeneuve-d'Ascq	France	IAAF Grand Prix I
17	27 June	Norwich Union Super Grand Prix	Gateshead	United Kingdom	IAAF Super Grand Prix
18	28 June	Memorial Josefa Odlozila	Prague	Czech Republic	IAAF Grand Prix II
19	29 June	Grand Prix Zagreb	Zagreb	Croatia	IAAF Grand Prix I
20	2 July	Golden Gala	Rome	Italy	2004 IAAF Golden League
21	4 July	Super Grand Prix Tsiklitiria	Heraklion	Greece	IAAF Super Grand Prix
22	6 July	Athletissima	Lausanne	Switzerland	IAAF Super Grand Prix
23	9 July	Brothers Znamensky Memorial	Kazan	Russia	IAAF Grand Prix II
24	17 July	Meeting de Madrid	Madrid	Spain	IAAF Super Grand Prix
25	19 July	International Meeting Thessaloniki	Thessaloniki	Greece	IAAF Grand Prix II
26	23 July	Meeting de Paris	Paris	France	2004 IAAF Golden League
27	27 July	DN Galan	Stockholm	Sweden	IAAF Super Grand Prix
28	30 July	Norwich Union British Grand Prix	London	United Kingdom	IAAF Super Grand Prix
29	31 July	KBC Night of Athletics	Heusden-Zolder	Belgium	IAAF Grand Prix II
30	2 August	Intersport Gugl-Meeting	Linz	Austria	IAAF Grand Prix I
31	6 August	Weltklasse Zürich	Zürich	Switzerland	2004 IAAF Golden League
32	3 September	Memorial Van Damme	Brussels	Belgium	2004 IAAF Golden League
33	5 September	Rieti Meeting	Rieti	Italy	IAAF Grand Prix I
34	12 September	ISTAF Berlin	Berlin	Germany	2004 IAAF Golden League
F	18–19 September	2004 IAAF World Athletics Final	Fontvieille	Monaco	IAAF World Athletics Final
