= 2002 European Athletics Indoor Championships – Men's triple jump =

The men's triple jump event at the 2002 European Athletics Indoor Championships was held on March 2–3.

== Medalists ==
Gold	Silver	Bronze
Christian Olsson; Sweden	Marian Oprea; Romania	Aliaksandar Hlavatski; Belarus

== Results ==
=== Qualification ===
Qualifying perf. 16.80 (Q) or 8 best performers (q) advanced to the Final.

Rank	Athlete	Nationality	#1	#2	#3	Result	Note
1	Marian Oprea	Romania	17.28			17.28	Q
2	Christian Olsson	Sweden	16.99			16.99	Q
3	Igor Spasovkhodskiy	Russia	16.16	X	16.77	16.77	q
4	Aleksandr Sergeyev	Russia	16.73	16.72	16.64	16.73	q
5	Aleksandr Glavatskiy	Belarus	16.60	16.32	X	16.60	q
6	Karl Taillepierre	France	16.55	16.32	16.57	16.57	q
6	Fabrizio Donato	Italy	16.57	16.55	X	16.57	q
8	Rostislav Dimitrov	Bulgaria	16.54	15.23	16.15	16.54	q
9	Jérôme Romain	France	16.51	16.50	16.50	16.51	
10	Jacek Kazimierowski	Poland	15.77	16.40	16.28	16.40	
11	Dmitriy Valyukevich	Belarus	15.65	16.38	X	16.38	
12	Thomas Moede	Germany	15.51	16.13	16.36	16.36	
13	Sébastien Pincemail	France	16.01	15.93	16.32	16.32	
14	Dimitrios Zalaggitis	Greece	15.96	X	X	15.96	
15	Aleksandr Aseledchenko	Russia	X	15.92	15.73	15.92	
16	Anton Andersson	Sweden	15.84	X	15.85	15.85	
17	Boštjan Šimunič	Slovenia	15.56	X	X	15.56	
	Kjetil Hanstveit	Norway	X	X	X	NM	

=== Final ===
Rank	Athlete	Nationality	#1	#2	#3	#4	#5	#6	Result	Note
1st place, gold medalist(s)	Christian Olsson	Sweden	17.54	15.78	17.23	–	17.32	X	17.54	=CR
2nd place, silver medalist(s)	Marian Oprea	Romania	17.22	X	X	–	X	17.04	17.22	
3rd place, bronze medalist(s)	Aliaksandar Hlavatski	Belarus	16.69	X	X	16.55	16.73	17.05	17.05	
4	Fabrizio Donato	Italy	16.16	X	16.77	16.90	X	X	16.90	
5	Rostislav Dimitrov	Bulgaria	16.57	16.79	X	X	X	X	16.79	
6	Aleksandr Sergeyev	Russia	15.96	16.53	16.00	16.07	16.50	16.56	16.56	
7	Igor Spasovkhodskiy	Russia	15.76	16.42	X	16.52	X	13.90	16.52	
8	Karl Taillepierre	France	X	X	X	X	X	16.46	16.46	
