= Athletics at the 2003 Pan American Games – Men's triple jump =

Men's triple jump at the Pan American Games

The final of the Men's triple jump event at the 2003 Pan American Games took place on Friday August 8, 2003. Cuba's Yoandri Betanzos took the title in his fifth attempt, jumping 17.26 metres.

== Medalists ==
Gold	Yoandri Betanzos; Cuba
Silver	Jadel Gregório; Brazil
Bronze	Yoelbi Quesada; Cuba

== Records ==
World Record	Jonathan Edwards (GBR)	18.29 m	August 7, 1995	Gothenburg, Sweden
Pan Am Record	João Carlos de Oliveira (BRA)	17.89 m	October 15, 1975	Mexico City, Mexico

== Results ==
Rank	Athlete	Attempts						Final
Rank	Athlete	1	2	3	4	5	6	Result
1	Yoandri Betanzos (CUB)	X	16.94	16.53	X	17.26	X	17.26 m
2	Jadel Gregório (BRA)	16.67	17.03	X	X	X	16.86	17.03 m
3	Yoelbi Quesada (CUB)	15.43	X	16.78	X	X	16.73	16.78 m
4	Allen Simms (USA)	16.10	X	X	16.21	16.56	16.38	16.56 m
5	Aarik Wilson (USA)	15.95	15.98	16.18	15.74	16.11	16.20	16.20 m
6	Ayata Joseph (ANT)	X	15.70	X	15.69	-	16.09	16.09 m
7	Dane Magloire (LCA)	X	15.50	15.91	-	15.76	15.38	15.91 m
8	Gregory Hughes (BAR)	15.29	15.39	15.41	15.13	15.28	15.69	15.69 m
9	Brian Wellman (BER)	14.60	X	15.31				15.31 m
10	Benaud Shirley (JAM)	14.70	X	X				14.70 m
—	Leevan Sands (BAH)							DNS

== See also ==
- 2003 World Championships in Athletics – Men's triple jump
- Athletics at the 2004 Summer Olympics – Men's triple jump
