= 2004 IAAF World Indoor Championships – Men's triple jump =

The Men's triple jump event at the 2004 IAAF World Indoor Championships was held on 5–7 March 2004.

The winning margin was 40 cm which as of July 2024 remains the greatest winning margin at the men's triple jump at these championships.

== Medalists ==
Gold	Silver	Bronze
Christian Olsson; Sweden	Jadel Gregório; Brazil	Yoandris Betanzos; Cuba

== Results ==
=== Qualification ===
Qualifying performance 16.95 (Q) or 8 best performers (q) advanced to the final.

Rank	Group	Athlete	Nationality	#1	#2	#3	Result	Notes
1	B	Mykola Savolaynen	Ukraine	16.50	16.82	17.16	17.16	Q
2	A	Dmitrij Valukevic	Belarus	17.16			17.16	Q
3	A	Yoandris Betanzos	Cuba	14.09	17.10		17.10	Q
4	B	Marian Oprea	Romania	17.01			17.01	Q
5	A	Christian Olsson	Sweden	16.99			16.99	Q
6	B	Jadel Gregório	Brazil	16.96			16.96	Q
7	B	Julien Kapek	France	16.78	16.95		16.95	Q
8	B	Danil Burkenya	Russia	16.65	15.37	16.79	16.79	q
9	B	Hristos Meletoglou	Greece	16.19	16.54	16.79	16.79	NR
10	A	Daniel Donovici	Romania	16.72	16.65	16.76	16.76	
11	B	Fabrizio Donato	Italy	15.01	16.68	15.52	16.68	
12	A	Andrew Murphy	Australia	16.67	16.60	16.45	16.67	
13	A	Aleksandr Sergeev	Russia	16.49	16.60	16.56	16.60	
14	B	Momchil Karailiev	Bulgaria	15.91	16.57	16.34	16.57	SB
15	B	Allen Simms	United States	16.08	16.49	15.95	16.49	
16	A	LaMark Carter	United States	16.23	X	16.47	16.47	
17	A	Gu Junjie	China	16.06	16.38	16.40	16.40	SB
18	A	Sébastien Pincemail	France	16.38	X	X	16.38	
19	A	Nelson Évora	Portugal	16.30	15.17	16.10	16.30	
20	B	Olivier Sanou	Burkina Faso	16.09	X	X	16.09	SB
21	A	Péter Tölgyesi	Hungary	15.97	15.64	X	15.97	
	B	Arnie David Giralt	Cuba				DNS	

=== Final ===
Rank	Athlete	Nationality	#1	#2	#3	#4	#5	#6	Result	Notes
1st place, gold medalist(s)	Christian Olsson	Sweden	17.30	17.51	17.83	–	17.45	–	17.83	WR
2nd place, silver medalist(s)	Jadel Gregório	Brazil	16.87	17.43	16.88	17.28	17.01	17.21	17.43	
3rd place, bronze medalist(s)	Yoandris Betanzos	Cuba	14.56	17.07	17.23	X	X	17.36	17.36	
4	Dmitrij Valukevic	Belarus	17.07	17.14	17.22	X	16.95	X	17.22	
5	Marian Oprea	Romania	16.70	17.19	17.15	16.75	X	16.92	17.19	SB
6	Mykola Savolaynen	Ukraine	16.76	X	16.67	16.53	16.73	16.95	16.95	
7	Danil Burkenya	Russia	16.28	16.53	X	16.62	16.52	16.34	16.62	
8	Julien Kapek	France	16.01	16.43	16.48	16.37	16.50	X	16.50	
