= Nousiainen (surname) =

Nousiainen is a Finnish surname. Notable people with the surname include:

- Heikki Nousiainen (born 1945), Finnish actor
- Mikko Nousiainen (born 1975), Finnish actor
- Mona-Liisa Nousiainen (1983–2019), Finnish cross country skier
- Viljo Nousiainen (1944–1999), Sweden Finn athletics coach
- Ville Nousiainen (born 1983), Finnish cross-country skier
