= 2012 IAAF World Indoor Championships – Men's triple jump =

The men's triple jump at the 2012 IAAF World Indoor Championships took place March 10 and 11 at the Ataköy Athletics Arena.

== Medalists ==
Gold	Silver	Bronze
Will Claye; United States	Christian Taylor; United States	Lyukman Adams; Russia

== Records ==
Standing records prior to the 2012 IAAF World Indoor Championships
World record	Teddy Tamgho (FRA)	17.92	Paris, France	6 March 2011
Championship record	Teddy Tamgho (FRA)	17.90	Doha, Qatar	14 March 2010
World Leading	Will Claye (USA)	17.63	Albuquerque, New Mexico, United States	25 February 2012
African record	Ajayi Agbebaku (NGR)	17.00	Dallas, United States	30 January 1982
Asian record	Oleg Sakirkin (KAZ)	17.09	Moscow, Russia	27 February 1993
European record	Teddy Tamgho (FRA)	17.92	Paris, France	6 March 2011
North and Central American and Caribbean record	Aliecer Urrutia (CUB)	17.83	Sindelfingen, Germany	1 March 1997
Oceanian Record	Andrew Murphy (AUS)	17.20	Lisbon, Portugal	9 March 2001
South American record	Jadel Gregório (BRA)	17.56	Moscow, Russia	12 March 2006

== Qualification standards ==
Indoor
17.00

== Schedule ==
Date	Time	Round
March 10, 2012	9:35	Qualification
March 11, 2012	16:10	Final

== Results ==
=== Qualification ===
Qualification standard 17.00 m (Q) or at least best 8 qualified. 13 athletes from 10 countries participated. One athlete did not start the competition. The qualification round started at 09:35 and ended at 10:25.

Rank	Athlete	Nationality	#1	#2	#3	Result	Notes
1	Christian Taylor	United States	17.39			17.39	Q, SB
2	Fabrizio Donato	Italy	17.07			17.07	Q
3	Lyukman Adams	Russia	x	16.67	17.04	17.04	Q, SB
4	Will Claye	United States	16.84	17.01		17.01	Q
5	Daniele Greco	Italy	15.82	16.94	16.83	16.94	q
6	Dong Bin	China	16.64	16.63	16.94	16.94	q
7	Alexis Copello	Cuba	x	16.90		16.90	q
8	Benjamin Compaoré	France	16.46	16.73	16.81	16.81	q
9	Arnie David Giralt	Cuba	x	16.71	16.56	16.71	
10	Jefferson Sabino	Brazil	16.67	x	16.22	16.67	SB
11	Marian Oprea	Romania	16.58	x	x	16.58	
12	Sheryf El-Sheryf	Ukraine	15.58	x	16.25	16.25	
13	Samyr Lainé	Haiti	15.63	15.74	16.06	16.06	
	Tosin Oke	Nigeria				DNS	

=== Final ===
8 athletes from 6 countries participated. The final started at 16:10 and ended at 17:17.

Rank	Athlete	Nationality	#1	#2	#3	#4	#5	#6	Result	Notes
1st place, gold medalist(s)	Will Claye	United States	16.89	x	x	17.70	17.63	17.53	17.70	WL
2nd place, silver medalist(s)	Christian Taylor	United States	17.63	x	17.02	17.29	17.05	17.20	17.63	SB
3rd place, bronze medalist(s)	Lyukman Adams	Russia	16.98	x	x	x	17.36	x	17.36	PB
4	Fabrizio Donato	Italy	16.99	17.28	x	—	—	—	17.28	SB
5	Daniele Greco	Italy	x	16.55	x	16.93	x	17.28	17.28	PB
6	Benjamin Compaoré	France	17.05	x	x	x	x	x	17.05	
7	Alexis Copello	Cuba	16.92	x	x	x	16.64	x	16.92	
8	Dong Bin	China	14.64	16.41	16.75	16.51	x	16.48	16.75	
