= 2002 European Athletics Championships – Men's triple jump =

Men's triple jump at the European Athletics Championships

The Men's triple jump event at the 2002 European Athletics Championships was held at the Olympic Stadium on August 6 and August 8.

== Medalists ==
| Gold | Christian Olsson; Sweden (SWE) |
| Silver | Charles Friedek; Germany (GER) |
| Bronze | (United Kingdom) Jonathan Edwards; Great Britain (GBR) |

== Abbreviations ==
- All results shown are in metres

| Q | automatic qualification |
| q | qualification by rank |
| DNS | did not start |
| NM | no mark |
| WR | world record |
| AR | area record |
| NR | national record |
| PB | personal best |
| SB | season best |

== Schedule ==
| Date | Time | Round |
|---|---|---|
| August 6, 2002 | ? | Qualification |
| August 8, 2002 | ? | Final |

== Records ==
Standing records prior to the 2002 European Athletics Championships
| World Record | Jonathan Edwards (GBR) | 18.29 m | August 7, 1995 | Gothenburg, Sweden |
| Event Record | Jonathan Edwards (GBR) | 17.99 m | August 23, 1998 | Budapest, Hungary |

== Results ==
=== Qualification ===
Qualification: Qualifying Performance 16.80 (Q) or at least 12 best performers (q) advance to the final.

| Rank | Group | Athlete | Nationality | #1 | #2 | #3 | Result | Notes |
|---|---|---|---|---|---|---|---|---|
| 1 | A | Phillips Idowu | Great Britain | | | | 17.54 | Q |
| 2 | B | Christian Olsson | Sweden | | | | 17.01 | Q |
| 3 | A | Jonathan Edwards | Great Britain | | | | 16.99 | Q |
| 4 | A | Fabrizio Donato | Italy | | | | 16.80 | Q |
| 5 | A | Aleksandr Glavatskiy | Belarus | | | | 16.78 | q |
| 6 | B | Rostislav Dimitrov | Bulgaria | | | | 16.77 | q |
| 7 | B | Charles Friedek | Germany | | | | 16.77 | q |
| 8 | B | Aleksey Musikhin | Russia | | | | 16.64 | q |
| 9 | A | Konstadinos Zalagitis | Greece | | | | 16.57 | q |
| 10 | B | Julien Kapek | France | | | | 16.53 | q |
| 11 | A | Mykola Savolaynen | Ukraine | | | | 16.50 | q |
| 12 | B | Tosin Oke | Great Britain | | | | 16.48 | q |
| 13 | B | Michael Velter | Belgium | | | | 16.47 | |
| 14 | B | Marian Oprea | Romania | | | | 16.47 | |
| 15 | A | Lauri Leis | Estonia | | | | 16.37 | |
| 16 | A | Igor Spasovkhodskiy | Russia | | | | 16.28 | |
| 17 | B | Arvydas Nazarovas | Lithuania | | | | 16.17 | |
| 18 | A | Vladimir Letnicov | Moldova | | | | 16.09 | |
| 19 | B | Jacek Kazimierowski | Poland | | | | 15.94 | |
| 20 | B | Avi Tayari | Israel | | | | 15.94 | |
| 21 | A | Boštjan Šimunič | Slovenia | | | | 15.64 | |
| 22 | A | Hristos Meletoglou | Greece | | | | 15.24 | |
| | A | Ionut Punga | Romania | x | x | x | NM | |
| | B | Stamatis Lenis | Greece | x | x | x | NM | |

=== Final ===
| Rank | Athlete | Nationality | #1 | #2 | #3 | #4 | #5 | #6 | Result | Notes |
|---|---|---|---|---|---|---|---|---|---|---|
| 1st place, gold medalist(s) | Christian Olsson | Sweden | 17.16 | 17.44 | 17.42 | 17.43 | 17.53 | - | 17.53 | |
| 2nd place, silver medalist(s) | Charles Friedek | Germany | x | 17.33 | x | x | x | x | 17.33 | |
| 3rd place, bronze medalist(s) | Jonathan Edwards | Great Britain | 17.12 | 17.32 | 17.11 | x | 17.11 | x | 17.32 | |
| 4 | Fabrizio Donato | Italy | x | 17.15 | x | x | x | x | 17.15 | |
| 5 | Phillips Idowu | Great Britain | x | 15.29 | 16.92 | 16.85 | x | 15.62 | 16.92 | |
| 6 | Aleksandr Glavatskiy | Belarus | 16.37 | x | 16.86 | x | x | x | 16.86 | |
| 7 | Julien Kapek | France | 15.92 | 16.66 | 16.57 | x | x | 16.31 | 16.66 | |
| 8 | Konstadinos Zalagitis | Greece | 16.62 | 16.46 | x | x | x | 15.30 | 16.62 | |
| 9 | Rostislav Dimitrov | Bulgaria | x | 16.16 | 16.57 | | | | 16.57 | |
| 10 | Mykola Savolaynen | Ukraine | 16.55 | x | 16.39 | | | | 16.55 | |
| 11 | Aleksey Musikhin | Russia | 16.47 | 16.09 | 16.45 | | | | 16.47 | |
| | Tosin Oke | Great Britain | x | x | x | | | | NM | |
