= 2003 IAAF World Indoor Championships – Men's triple jump =

The men's triple jump event at the 2003 IAAF World Indoor Championships was held on March 16.

== Results ==
| Rank | Athlete | Nationality | #1 | #2 | #3 | #4 | #5 | #6 | Result | Notes |
|---|---|---|---|---|---|---|---|---|---|---|
| 1st place, gold medalist(s) | Christian Olsson | Sweden | 16.95 | 16.64 | X | 17.28 | 17.31 | 17.70 | 17.70 | WL |
| 2nd place, silver medalist(s) | Walter Davis | United States | 16.74 | 16.44 | 16.52 | 16.85 | 16.92 | 17.35 | 17.35 | PB |
| 3rd place, bronze medalist(s) | Yoelbi Quesada | Cuba | 16.53 | 16.96 | X | 16.85 | 16.54 | 17.27 | 17.27 | SB |
| 4 | Jonathan Edwards | Great Britain | 16.79 | 17.01 | 14.58 | 15.02 | 17.19 | 17.00 | 17.19 | |
| 5 | Timothy Rusan | United States | X | X | 16.68 | 16.80 | X | 16.88 | 16.88 | |
| 6 | Jadel Gregório | Brazil | X | 16.68 | X | X | X | 16.86 | 16.86 | |
| 7 | Aleksandr Glavatskiy | Belarus | 16.45 | 16.45 | 16.28 | 15.64 | 16.16 | 16.66 | 16.66 | |
| 8 | Marian Oprea | Romania | 16.59 | 16.51 | X | X | 16.54 | 16.41 | 16.59 | |
| 9 | Vladimir Letnicov | Moldova | X | 16.14 | 16.20 | | | | 16.20 | |
