= Julien Kapek =

French triple jumper

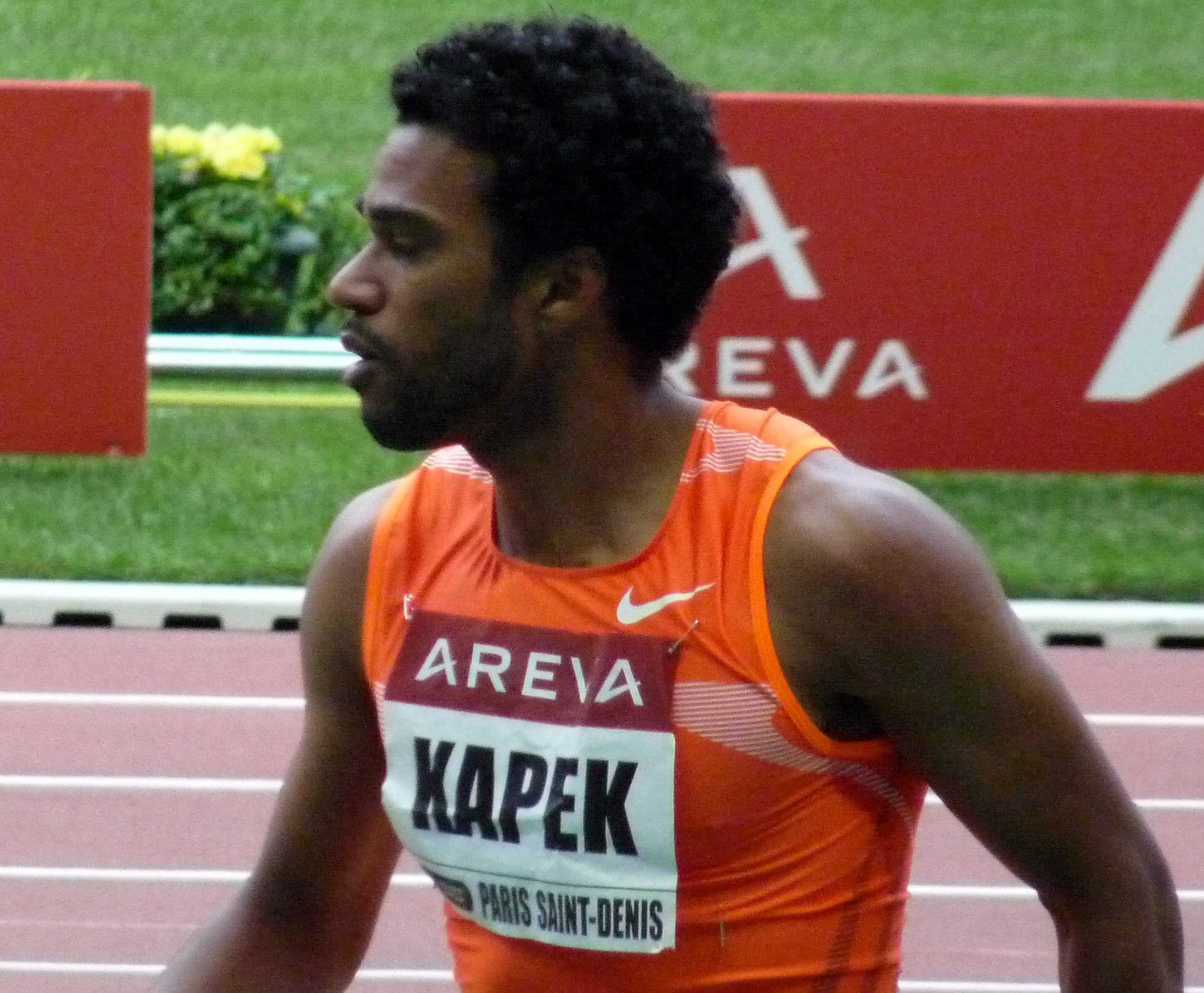
Julien Kapek at Meeting Areva in 2009

Julien Kapek (born 12 January 1979 in Clamart, Hauts-de-Seine) is a French triple jumper.

His personal best is 17.38 metres, achieved in July 2006 in Tomblaine. This result places him fourth on the all-time French performers list, only behind Serge Hélan and Karl Taillepierre.

Competing for the USC Trojans track and field team, Kapek broke the school's record and eventually won an NCAA DI triple jump title.

== Achievements ==
| Year | Competition | Venue | Position | Notes |
Representing France
| 2001 | European U23 Championships | Amsterdam, Netherlands | 19th (q) | 15.54 m (wind: 1.2 m/s) |
| 2002 | European Championships | Munich, Germany | 7th | 16.66 m |
| 2003 | World Championships | Paris, France | 14th (q) | 16.62 m |
| 2004 | World Indoor Championships | Budapest, Hungary | 8th | 16.50 m |
| 2004 | Olympic Games | Athens, Greece | 10th | 16.81 m |
| 2005 | Mediterranean Games | Almería, Spain | 9th | 16.19 m |
| 2006 | European Championships | Gothenburg, Sweden | 13th (q) | 16.74 m |
| 2007 | World Championships | Osaka, Japan | 19th (q) | 16.55 m |
| 2009 | Jeux de la Francophonie | Beirut, Lebanon | 3rd | 16.23 m |

== See also ==
- List of doping cases in athletics
