= 2003 European Athletics U23 Championships – Men's triple jump =

The men's triple jump event at the 2003 European Athletics U23 Championships was held in Bydgoszcz, Poland, at Zawisza Stadion on 17 and 19 July.

== Medalists ==
Gold	Dmitrij Valukevic; Belarus
Silver	Marian Oprea; Romania
Bronze	Rudolf Helpling; Germany

== Results ==
=== Final ===
19 July

Rank	Name	Nationality	Attempts						Result	Notes
Rank	Name	Nationality	1	2	3	4	5	6	Result	Notes
1st place, gold medalist(s)	Dmitrij Valukevic	Belarus	17.16 (w: 0.6 m/s)	17.51 (w: 0.5 m/s)	x	17.57 (w: 0.2 m/s)	16.91 (w: 0.4 m/s)	x	17.57 (w: 0.2 m/s)	CR
2nd place, silver medalist(s)	Marian Oprea	Romania	17.15 (w: 0.2 m/s)	17.26 (w: 0.4 m/s)	17.28 (w: 0.1 m/s)	x	16.82 (w: 0.3 m/s)	17.13 (w: 0.2 m/s)	17.28 (w: 0.1 m/s)	
3rd place, bronze medalist(s)	Rudolf Helpling	Germany	16.22 (w: 0.2 m/s)	16.08 (w: 0.9 m/s)	16.14 (w: 0.4 m/s)	16.66 (w: 0.4 m/s)	16.26 (w: 0.7 m/s)	x	16.66 (w: 0.4 m/s)	
4	Momchil Karailiev	Bulgaria	16.44 (w: 0.1 m/s)	16.48 (w: 0.3 m/s)	16.38 (w: 0.4 m/s)	16.23 (w: 0.5 m/s)	15.86 (w: 0.7 m/s)	16.18 (w: 0.0 m/s)	16.48 (w: 0.3 m/s)	
5	Aleksandr Sergeyev	Russia	16.31 (w: 0.3 m/s)	15.52 (w: 0.6 m/s)	16.20 (w: 0.4 m/s)	16.36 (w: 0.5 m/s)	x	16.32 (w: -0.1 m/s)	16.36 (w: 0.5 m/s)	
6	Yuri Litvinski	Bulgaria	16.27 (w: 0.2 m/s)	13.77 (w: 0.2 m/s)	x	13.82 (w: 0.5 m/s)	15.37 (w: 0.9 m/s)	x	16.27 (w: 0.2 m/s)	
7	Fabrizio Schembri	Italy	16.24 (w: 1.1 m/s)	15.95 (w: 0.7 m/s)	x	16.02 (w: 0.4 m/s)	15.96 (w: 0.3 m/s)	16.10 (w: 0.0 m/s)	16.24 (w: 1.1 m/s)	
8	Péter Tölgyesi	Hungary	13.69 (w: 0.8 m/s)	15.96 (w: 0.3 m/s)	16.22 (w: 0.7 m/s)	16.22 (w: 0.6 m/s)	16.05 (w: 0.4 m/s)	15.95 (w: 0.2 m/s)	16.22 (w: 0.6 m/s)	
9	Andreas Pohle	Germany	15.78 (w: 1.3 m/s)	16.17 (w: 0.1 m/s)	15.73 (w: 0.2 m/s)				16.17 (w: 0.1 m/s)	
10	Vladimir Letnicov	Moldova	15.20 (w: 1.0 m/s)	15.78 (w: 0.6 m/s)	x				15.78 (w: 0.6 m/s)	
11	Chiril Lisnic	Moldova	15.73 (w: 0.4 m/s)	x	x				15.73 (w: 0.4 m/s)	
12	Alassane Diarra	France	x	15.05 (w: 0.4 m/s)	15.67 (w: 0.5 m/s)				15.67 (w: 0.5 m/s)	

=== Qualifications ===
17 July
Qualifying 16.50 or 12 best to the Final

==== Group A ====
Rank	Name	Nationality	Result	Notes
1	Dmitrij Valukevic	Belarus	16.83 (w: 0.8 m/s)	Q
2	Yuri Litvinski	Bulgaria	16.56 (w: 1.4 m/s)	Q
3	Andreas Pohle	Germany	16.22 (w: 0.9 m/s)	q
4	Vladimir Letnicov	Moldova	16.15 (w: 0.6 m/s)	q
5	Alassane Diarra	France	16.03 (w: 0.6 m/s)	q
6	Aleksandr Sergeyev	Russia	15.99	q
7	Nathan Douglas	Great Britain	15.68 (w: 0.9 m/s)	
8	Stelios Kapsalis	Cyprus	15.52 (w: 1.1 m/s)	
9	Antonio Arciello	Italy	14.94 (w: -0.1 m/s)	
10	Anton Andersson	Sweden	14.51 (w: 0.9 m/s)	

==== Group B ====
Rank	Name	Nationality	Result	Notes
1	Marian Oprea	Romania	16.85 (w: -0.7 m/s)	Q
2	Momchil Karailiev	Bulgaria	16.40 (w: -0.4 m/s)	q
3	Rudolf Helpling	Germany	16.36 (w: -0.6 m/s)	q
4	Péter Tölgyesi	Hungary	16.02 (w: -0.4 m/s)	q
5	Fabrizio Schembri	Italy	15.98 (w: -0.7 m/s)	q
6	Chiril Lisnic	Moldova	15.94 (w: -0.6 m/s)	q
7	Petr Hnízdil	Czech Republic	15.76 (w: -0.4 m/s)	
8	Gaspar Araújo	Portugal	15.41 (w: -0.6 m/s)	

== Participation ==
According to an unofficial count, 18 athletes from 14 countries participated in the event.

- Belarus (1)
- Bulgaria (2)
- Cyprus (1)
- Czech Republic (1)
- France (1)
- Germany (2)
- Great Britain (1)
- Hungary (1)
- Italy (2)
- Moldova (2)
- Portugal (1)
- Romania (1)
- Russia (1)
- Sweden (1)
