= Igor Spasovkhodskiy =

Russian triple jumper (born 1979)

Igor Igorevich Spasovkhodskiy (Russian: Игорь Игоревич Спасовходский) (born 1 August 1979 in Moscow) is a Russian triple jumper. He is best known for his bronze medal at the 2001 World Championships, which he took with a personal best jump of 17.44 metres.

== International competitions ==
Year	Competition	Venue	Position	Event	Notes
Representing Russia
2000	European Indoor Championships	Ghent, Belgium	14th (q)	Triple jump	16.31 m
2000	Olympic Games	Sydney, Australia	33rd (q)	Triple jump	15.79 m
2001	European U23 Championships	Amsterdam, Netherlands	2nd	Triple jump	17.08 m (wind: 0.2 m/s)
2001	World Championships	Edmonton, Canada	3rd	Triple jump	17.44 m
2001	Universiade	Beijing, China	4th	Triple jump	16.91 m
2001	Goodwill Games	Brisbane, Australia	6th	Triple jump	16.20 m
2002	European Indoor Championships	Vienna, Austria	7th	Triple jump	16.52 m
2002	European Championships	Munich, Germany	16th (q)	Triple jump	16.28 m
2003	World Championships	Paris, France	20th (q)	Triple jump	16.45 m
2005	European Indoor Championships	Madrid, Spain	1st	Triple jump	17.20 m
2005	World Championships	Helsinki, Finland	16th (q)	Triple jump	16.45 m
2005	World Athletics Final	Monte Carlo, Monaco	7th	Triple jump	16.55 m
2006	World Indoor Championships	Moscow, Russia	5th	Triple jump	17.25 m
2008	Olympic Games	Beijing, China	9th	Triple jump	16.79 m
2009	European Indoor Championships	Turin, Italy	3rd	Triple jump	17.15 m
2009	World Championships	Berlin, Germany	7th	Triple jump	16.91 m
2010	World Indoor Championships	Doha, Qatar	8th	Triple jump	16.42 m
