= Momchil Karailiev =

Bulgarian triple jumper

Momchil Karailiev (Bulgarian: Момчил Караилиев) (born 21 May 1982) is a Bulgarian triple jumper. He represented his country at the 2004 and 2008 Olympic Games as well as three outdoor and four indoor World Championships.

His personal best jump is 17.41 metres, achieved in June 2009 in Sofia.

== International competitions ==
Year	Competition	Venue	Position	Notes
Representing Bulgaria
2003	European U23 Championships	Bydgoszcz, Poland	4th	16.48 m
2004	World Indoor Championships	Budapest, Hungary	14th (q)	16.57 m
2004	Olympic Games	Athens, Greece	22nd (q)	16.45 m
2005	European Indoor Championships	Madrid, Spain	5th	16.64 m
2005	World Championships	Helsinki, Finland	11th	16.70 m
2006	World Indoor Championships	Moscow, Russia	9th	16.87 m
2008	Olympic Games	Beijing, China	11th	16.48 m
2009	World Championships	Berlin, Germany	9th	16.82 m
2010	World Indoor Championships	Doha, Qatar	13th (q)	16.43 m
2010	European Championships	Barcelona, Spain	14th	15.24 m
2011	European Indoor Championships	Paris, France	15th (q)	16.29 m
2012	European Championships	Helsinki, Finland	5th	16.77 m
2016	European Championships	Amsterdam, Netherlands	4th	16.65 m
2017	World Championships	London, United Kingdom	15th (q)	16.57 m
2018	World Indoor Championships	Birmingham, United Kingdom	12th	16.14 m
