= Lyukman Adams =

Russian triple jumper

Personal information
- Born: 24 September 1988 (age 38) Leningrad, Russian SFSR, Soviet Union
- Height: 1.94 m (6 ft 4 1/2 in)
- Weight: 87 kg (192 lb)

Sport
- Country: Russia
- Sport: Athletics
- Event: Triple jump

Achievements and titles
- Personal best: 17.53 m (2012)
Medal record
World Indoor Championships
Disqualified	2014 Sopot	Triple jump
Bronze medal – third place	2012 Istanbul	Triple jump
European Championships
Disqualified	2014 Zürich	Triple jump

Lyukman Rasakovich Adams (Russian: Люкман Расакович Адамс; born 24 September 1988) is a Russian triple jumper. Adams is of Nigerian and Russian descent. In February 2019, the Court of Arbitration for Sport handed him a four-year ban for doping, starting from 31 January 2019.

== Biography ==
His father is Nigerian and his mother is Russian. He was born and raised in St. Petersburg.

His brother was Layonel Adams, a professional footballer who played for FC Turan.

== Doping Scandal ==
Adams received a four-year ban from athletics after being found guilty of doping by the Court of Arbitration for Sport on 31 January 2019. The ruling also disqualifies all of Adams' results achieved from 16 July 2012 to 14 September 2014.

== International competitions ==
Representing Russia
Year	Competition	Venue	Position	Event	Notes
2005	European Youth Olympic Festival	Lignano Sabbiadoro, Italy	1st	Triple jump	15.35 m
2007	European Junior Championships	Hengelo, Netherlands	1st	Triple jump	16.50 m
2010	European Championships	Barcelona, Spain	6th	Triple jump	16.78 m
2012	World Indoor Championships	Istanbul, Turkey	3rd	Triple jump	17.36 m
2012	Olympic Games	London, United Kingdom	DSQ	Triple jump	~~16.78 m~~
2014	World Indoor Championships	Sopot, Poland	DSQ	Triple jump	~~17.37 m~~
2014	European Championships	Zürich, Switzerland	DSQ	Triple jump	~~17.09 m~~
2015	World Championships	Beijing, China	5th	Triple jump	17.28 m

== See also ==
- List of doping cases in athletics
