= Karl Taillepierre =

French triple jumper (born 1976)

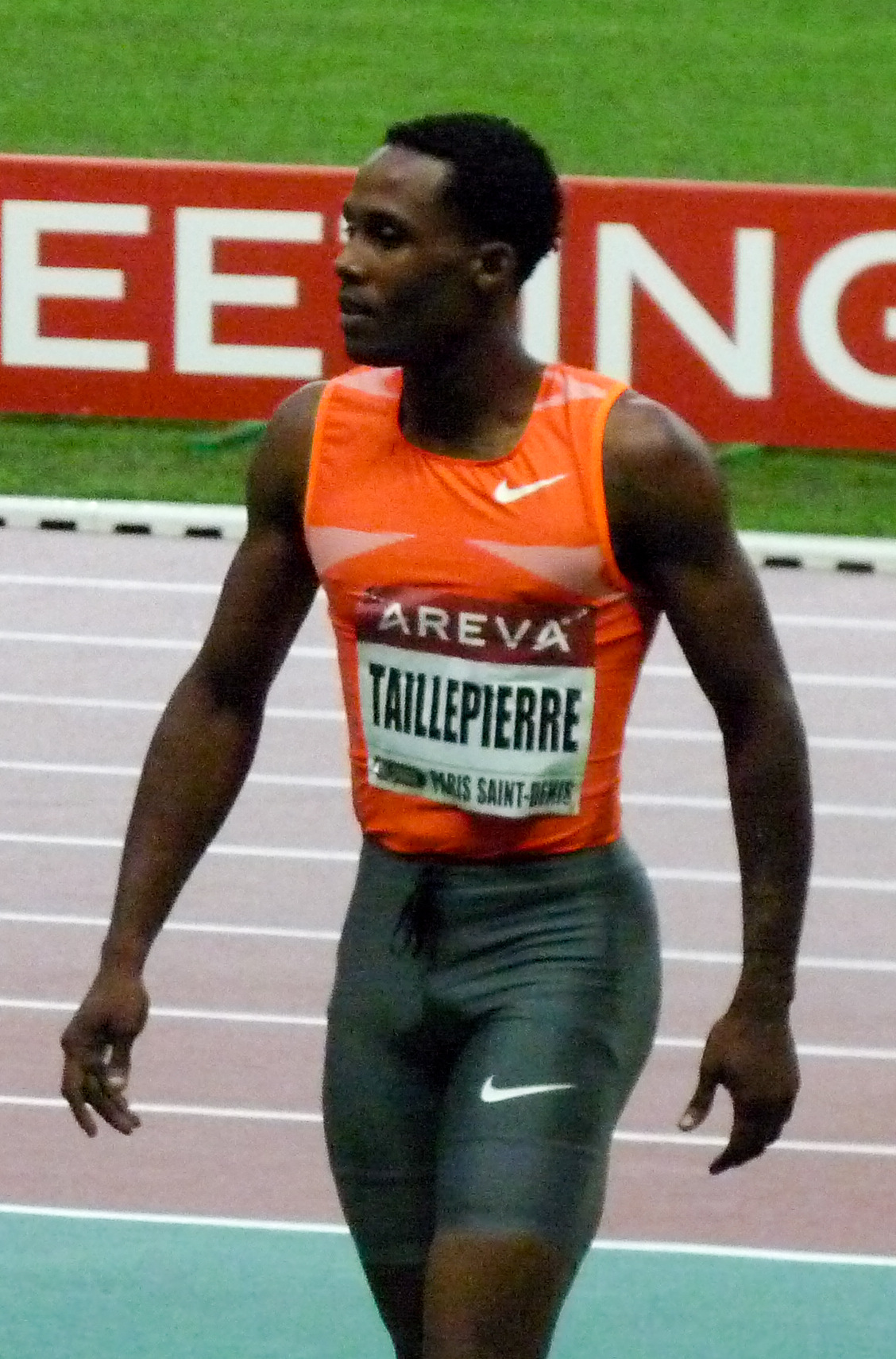
Karl Taillepierre, Meeting Areva 2009

Karl Taillepierre (born 13 August 1976, in Pointe-à-Pitre, Guadeloupe) is a French triple jumper.

His personal best jump is 17.45 metres, achieved in July 2005 in Angers. This result places him third on the all-time French performers list, behind Serge Hélan and Teddy Tamgho.

== Competition record ==
Year	Competition	Venue	Position	Notes
Representing France
2001	World Championships	Edmonton, Canada	15th (q)	16.58 m
2001	Mediterranean Games	Radès, Tunisia	5th	16.00 m
2002	European Indoor Championships	Vienna, Austria	8th	16.46 m
2004	Olympic Games	Athens, Greece	42nd (q)	15.50 m
2004	World Athletics Final	Monte Carlo, Monaco	5th	17.04 m
2005	World Championships	Helsinki, Finland	5th	17.27 m
2006	World Indoor Championships	Moscow, Russia	12th (q)	16.80 m
2006	European Championships	Gothenburg, Sweden	21st (q)	16.34 m
2007	European Indoor Championships	Birmingham, United Kingdom	16th (q)	15.87 m
2009	European Indoor Championships	Turin, Italy	4th	17.12 m
2011	European Indoor Championships	Paris, France	9th (q)	16.62 m
2012	European Championships	Helsinki, Finland	18th (q)	16.20 m
2013	European Indoor Championships	Vienna, Austria	6th	16.72 m
2013	Mediterranean Games	Mersin, Turkey	4th	16.26 m
