= Yoandri Betanzos =

Cuban triple jumper (born 1982)

Personal information
- Full name: Yoandri Betanzos Francis
- Born: February 15, 1982 (age 44) Santiago de Cuba, Santiago de Cuba
- Height: 1.80 m (5 ft 11 in)
- Weight: 71 kg (157 lb)

Sport
- Country: Cuba
- Sport: Athletics
- Event: Triple jump
Medal record
Men's athletics
Representing Cuba
World Championships
Silver medal – second place	2003 Paris	Triple jump
Silver medal – second place	2005 Helsinki	Triple jump
World Indoor Championships
Silver medal – second place	2010 Doha	Triple jump
Bronze medal – third place	2004 Budapest	Triple jump
Bronze medal – third place	2006 Moscow	Triple jump
Pan American Games
Gold medal – first place	2003 Santo Domingo	Triple jump
Silver medal – second place	2011 Guadalajara	Triple jump
Bronze medal – third place	2007 Rio de Janeiro	Triple jump
- Updated on 21 June 2013

Yoandri (or Yoandris) Betanzos Francis (born February 15, 1982, in Santiago de Cuba) is a Cuban athlete competing in the triple jump.

== Early life and career ==
They say, he was almost born on the track: His mother, Cuban sprinter Amarailis Francis, suffered from a heavy abdominal pain during her daily practice, and was immediately transferred to a hospital in her hometown Santiago de Cuba. A couple of hours later, she gave birth to her son.

Later, he moved to Ciego de Ávila, the hometown of his father, Cuban boxer Álvaro Betanzos, and started his sports career following in his father's footsteps as a boxer. After about a year, he changed to athletics, firstly competing as a high jumper. In 1993, he became Cuban national champion in his age group setting a new record of 1.86 m, beating the old mark set by Javier Sotomayor. As he was not tall enough, his coaches proposed to change to triple jump.

== Personal bests ==
His personal best outdoor jump is 17.65 metres, achieved in April 2009 in Havana. As of 21 June 2013, this result places him sixth on the all-time Cuban performers list, behind Yoelbi Quesada, Lázaro Betancourt, Aliecer Urrutia, Pedro Pichardo, and Alexis Copello.

Event	Best	Venue	Date
Outdoor
High jump	2.10 m		
Long jump	6.10 m (wind: +0.4 m/s)	(Spain) Castellón	28 June 2011
Triple jump	17.65 m (wind: +1.4 m/s)	(Cuba) Havana	25 April 2009
Indoor
Long jump	7.51 m	(Slovakia) Bratislava	30 January 2011
Triple jump	17.69 m	(Qatar) Doha	14 March 2010

== Achievements ==
Year	Competition	Venue	Position	Notes
Representing Cuba
1999	World Youth Championships	Bydgoszcz, Poland	2nd	15.83 m (wind: +0.1 m/s)
2000	World Junior Championships	Santiago, Chile	2nd	16.34 m (wind: +0.5 m/s)
2001	Central American and Caribbean Championships	Guatemala City, Guatemala	2nd	16.64 m A (wind: +0.2 m/s)
2001	Universiade	Beijing, China	5th	16.86 m w (wind: +2.7 m/s)
2001	Pan American Junior Championships	Santa Fe, Argentina	1st	16.47 m (wind: -0.8 m/s)
2003	Pan American Games	Santo Domingo, Dominican Republic	1st	17.26 m (wind: +1.1 m/s)
2003	World Championships	Paris, France	2nd	17.28 m (wind: +0.2 m/s)
2004	World Indoor Championships	Budapest, Hungary	3rd	17.36 m
2004	Ibero-American Championships	Huelva, Spain	1st	17.18 m (wind: +1.1 m/s)
2004	Olympic Games	Athens, Greece	4th	17.47 m (wind: +. m/s)
2005	Central American and Caribbean Championships	Nassau, Bahamas	1st	17.33 m w (wind: +3.0 m/s)
2005	World Championships	Helsinki, Finland	2nd	17.52 m (wind: +1.2 m/s)
2006	World Indoor Championships	Moscow, Russia	3rd	17.42 m
2006	Central American and Caribbean Games	Cartagena, Colombia	1st	17.46 m (wind: +0.8 m/s)
2007	Pan American Games	Rio de Janeiro, Brazil	3rd	16.90 m (wind: +0.7 m/s)
2007	World Championships	Osaka, Japan	20th (q)	16.54 m (wind: +0.0 m/s)
2009	ALBA Games	Havana, Cuba	2nd	17.65 m (wind: +1.4 m/s)
2009	Central American and Caribbean Championships	Havana, Cuba	2nd	17.24 m (wind: +0.0 m/s)
2009	World Championships	Berlin, Germany	17th (q)	16.77 m (wind: +0.0 m/s)
2010	World Indoor Championships	Doha, Qatar	2nd	17.69 m (wind: +. m/s)
2010	Ibero-American Championships	San Fernando, Spain	2nd	17.19 m (wind: +0.8 m/s)
2011	World Championships	Daegu, South Korea	11th	16.67 m (wind: -0.1 m/s)
2011	Pan American Games	Guadalajara, Mexico	2nd	16.54 m A (wind: +0.4 m/s)
2011	Pan American Games	Guadalajara, Mexico	1st	2:59.43 min A
2012	Ibero-American Championships	Barquisimeto, Venezuela	1st	16.75 m w (wind: +2.9 m/s)
2012	Olympic Games	London, United Kingdom	23rd	16.22 m w (wind: +2.9 m/s)
