= Lauri Leis =

Estonian triple jumper

Lauri Leis (born 7 October 1978 in Võru) is an Estonian triple jumper.

He finished seventh at the 2001 Summer Universiade. He also competed at the 2002 European Championships, the 2004 Olympic Games and the 2006 European Championships without reaching the final.

His personal best jump is 16.67 metres, achieved in July 2008 in Kose.

His coach is Andrei Nazarov.

== Achievements ==
Year	Competition	Venue	Position	Event	Result
Representing Estonia
2001	Universiade	Beijing, China	8th	Triple jump	16.19 m
2002	European Championships	Munich, Germany	15th (q)	Triple jump	16.37 m
2004	Olympic Games	Athens, Greece	33rd (q)	Triple jump	16.18 m
2006	European Championships	Gothenburg, Sweden	20th (q)	Triple jump	16.34 m
2009	World Championships	Berlin, Germany	38th (q)	Triple jump	15.98 m
