= Viktor Yastrebov =

Ukrainian triple jumper

Medal record

Men's athletics

European Indoor Championships
Silver medal – second place	2009 Torino	Triple jump

Summer Universiade
Silver medal – second place	2003 Daegu	Triple jump

World Youth Championships
Bronze medal – third place	1999 Bydgoszcz	Triple jump

European Junior Championships
Bronze medal – third place	2001 Grosseto	Triple jump

Viktor Anatoliyovych Yastrebov (Ukrainian: Віктор Анатолійович Ястребов; born 13 January 1982 in Nadvirna) is a Ukrainian triple jumper.

He finished seventh in the triple jump final at the 2006 European Athletics Championships in Gothenburg.

He also competed in the 2004 Summer Olympics but failed to progress from his pool.

== Competition record ==
Year	Competition	Venue	Position	Notes
Representing Ukraine
2000	World Junior Championships	Santiago, Chile	15th (q)	15.56 m (wind: +0.3 m/s)
2001	European Junior Championships	Grosseto, Italy	3rd	16.43 m
2003	Universiade	Daegu, South Korea	2nd	16.88 m
2004	Olympic Games	Athens, Greece	23rd (q)	16.43 m
2005	World Championships	Helsinki, Finland	9th	16.90 m
2006	World Indoor Championships	Moscow, Russia	10th (q)	16.89 m
2006	European Championships	Gothenburg, Sweden	7th	16.94 m
2007	World Championships	Osaka, Japan	17th (q)	16.57 m
2008	Olympic Games	Beijing, China	26th (q)	16.52 m
2009	European Indoor Championships	Turin, Italy	2nd	17.25 m
2009	World Championships	Berlin, Germany	31st (q)	16.31 m
2010	World Indoor Championships	Doha, Qatar	10th (q)	16.53 m
2013	European Indoor Championships	Gothenburg, Sweden	15th (q)	16.37 m
