= 2010 IAAF World Indoor Championships – Men's triple jump =

The men's triple jump at the 2010 IAAF World Indoor Championships was held at the ASPIRE Dome on 12 and 14 March.

== Medalists ==
Gold	Silver	Bronze
Teddy Tamgho; France	Yoandri Betanzos; Cuba	Arnie David Giralt; Cuba

== Records ==
Standing records prior to the 2010 IAAF World Indoor Championships
World record	Aliecer Urrutia (CUB)	17.83	Sindelfingen, Germany	1 March 1997
World record	Christian Olsson (SWE)	17.83	Budapest, Hungary	7 March 2004
Championship record	Christian Olsson (SWE)	17.83	Budapest, Hungary	7 March 2004
World Leading	Fabrizio Donato (ITA)	17.39	Ancona, Italy	28 February 2010
African record	Ajayi Agbebaku (NGR)	17.00	Dallas, United States	30 January 1982
Asian record	Oleg Sakirkin (KAZ)	17.09	Moscow, Russia	27 February 1993
European record	Christian Olsson (SWE)	17.83	Budapest, Hungary	7 March 2004
North and Central American and Caribbean record	Aliecer Urrutia (CUB)	17.83	Sindelfingen, Germany	1 March 1997
Oceanian Record	Andrew Murphy (AUS)	17.20	Lisbon, Portugal	9 March 2001
South American record	Jadel Gregório (BRA)	17.56	Moscow, Russia	12 March 2006

== Qualification standards ==
Indoor
16.95 m

== Schedule ==
Date	Time	Round
March 12, 2010	14:20	Qualification
March 14, 2010	17:40	Final

== Results ==
=== Qualification ===
Qualification: Qualifying Performance 16.95 (Q) or at least 8 best performers (q) advance to the final.

Rank	Athlete	Nationality	#1	#2	#3	Result	Notes
1	Yoandri Betanzos	Cuba	17.11			17.11	Q
2	Christian Olsson	Sweden	17.07			17.07	Q
3	Teddy Tamgho	France	16.90	x	15.91	16.90	q
4	Jadel Gregório	Brazil	16.27	16.85	x	16.85	q
5	Fabrizio Donato	Italy	16.55	16.82	x	16.82	q
6	Arnie David Giralt	Cuba	16.48	16.71	x	16.71	q
7	Igor Spasovkhodskiy	Russia	16.32	x	16.57	16.57	q
8	Dmitrij Vaľukevič	Slovakia	16.49	x	16.55	16.55	q
9	Li Yanxi	China	16.36	16.31	16.54	16.54	SB
10	Viktor Yastrebov	Ukraine	x	16.28	16.53	16.53	
11	Dimitrios Tsiamis	Greece	16.53	16.00	15.38	16.53	
12	Jefferson Sabino	Brazil	x	x	16.49	16.49	SB
13	Momchil Karailiev	Bulgaria	16.35	16.43	16.39	16.43	
14	Brandon Roulhac	United States	16.16	16.36	16.18	16.36	
15	Walter Davis	United States	16.33	x	x	16.33	
16	Samyr Lainé	Haiti	16.30	16.18	16.18	16.30	
17	Randy Lewis	Grenada	16.28	x	x	16.28	
18	Colomba Fofana	France	15.82	x	15.95	15.95	
19	Daniele Greco	Italy	15.60	x	15.39	15.60	

=== Final ===
Rank	Athlete	Nationality	#1	#2	#3	#4	#5	#6	Result	Notes
1st place, gold medalist(s)	Teddy Tamgho	France	17.41	17.24	x	x	17.50	17.90	17.90	WR
2nd place, silver medalist(s)	Yoandri Betanzos	Cuba	17.69	x	-	16.29	x	17.57	17.69	PB
3rd place, bronze medalist(s)	Arnie David Giralt	Cuba	17.15	17.21	17.17	16.45	17.36	16.88	17.36	SB
4	Christian Olsson	Sweden	17.23	16.90	-	-	-	-	17.23	
5	Fabrizio Donato	Italy	16.40	16.88	x	x	x	16.49	16.88	
6	Jadel Gregório	Brazil	x	x	16.60	x	16.78	16.39	16.78	
7	Dmitrij Valukevic	Slovakia	x	16.44	x	16.25	x	16.72	16.72	
8	Igor Spasovkhodskiy	Russia	16.42	x	x	-	16.11	x	16.42	
