= Fabrizio Donato =

Italian triple and long jumper

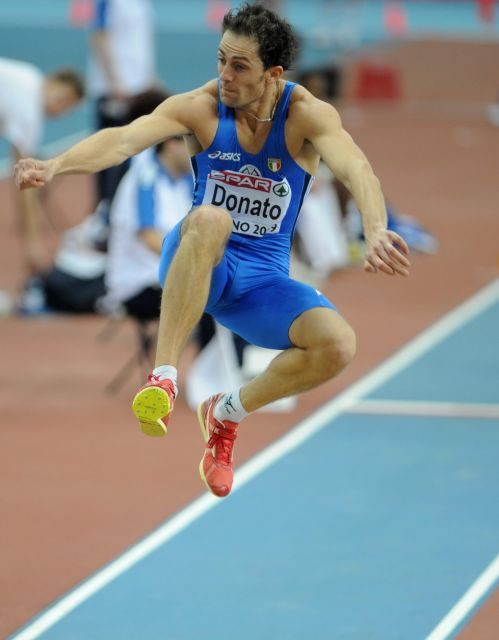

Personal information
- Nationality: Italian
- Born: 14 August 1976 (age 50) Frosinone, Italy
- Height: 1.90 m (6 ft 3 in)
- Weight: 83 kg (183 lb)

Sport
- Country: Italy
- Sport: Athletics
- Event: Triple jump
- Club: G.S. Fiamme Gialle

Achievements and titles
- Personal best: Triple jump: 17.73 m (2011)
Medal record
Event	1st	2nd	3rd
Olympic Games	0	0	1
European Championships	1	0	0
European Indoor Championships	1	2	0
European Cup	3	3	0
European Indoor Cup	0	0	1
Mediterranean Games	1	0	0
Total	6	5	2
Olympic Games
Bronze medal – third place	2012 London	Triple jump
European Championships
Gold medal – first place	2012 Helsinki	Triple jump
European Indoor Championships
Gold medal – first place	2009 Torino	Triple jump
Silver medal – second place	2011 Paris	Triple jump
Silver medal – second place	2017 Belgrade	Triple jump
European Cup
Gold medal – first place	2003 Florence	Triple jump
Gold medal – first place	2006 Malaga	Triple jump
Gold medal – first place	2015 Cheboksary	Triple jump
Silver medal – second place	2000 Gateshead	Triple jump
Silver medal – second place	2002 Annecy	Triple jump
Silver medal – second place	2014 Braunschweig	Triple jump
European Indoor Cup
Bronze medal – third place	2004 Leipzig	Triple jump
Mediterranean Games
Gold medal – first place	2001 Tunis	Triple jump

Fabrizio Donato (born 14 August 1976) is an Italian former athlete who competed in the triple jump and occasionally in the long jump. He is known for winning gold medals at the 2001 Mediterranean Games and the 2009 European Indoor Championships, the latter in a new championship record of 17.59 metres. He is the Italian record holder with 17.60 metres outdoor and 17.73 indoor.

== Biography ==
He was born in Frosinone. He participated at the 2000 Olympic Games without reaching the final. He cleared the 17-metre mark for the first time in June 2000 at the Notturna di Milano meeting – his mark of 17.60 m was a significant personal best and also improved Paolo Camossi's Italian record by 31 centimetres. This was the second best jump in Europe that year. In the same year he also became Italian champion for the first time. His main competitor around that time was Camossi.

In 2001 he finished sixth at the 2001 World Indoor Championships and won the gold medal at the 2001 Mediterranean Games. The winning result of 17.05 metres was his season's best. It was almost a championship record as well, but Marios Hadjiandreou's 17.13 metres from 1991 was slightly better. In 2002 he reached 17 metres for the first time indoor, with 17.03 metres in Genoa in February. He finished fourth at both the 2002 European Indoor Championships and the 2002 European Championships in the summer. In the latter competition he jumped 17.15 metres, and his season's best was 17.17.

Then, some less successful years followed. He competed without reaching the final at the 2003 World Championships, the 2004 World Indoor Championships and the 2004 Olympic Games. He failed to reach the 17-metre mark at all in 2004 and 2005. In 2006 he experienced an improvement with 17.33 metres indoor (Ancona, February) and 17.24 metres outdoor (Turin, July), but failed to reach the final at both the 2006 World Indoor Championships and the 2006 European Championships. He did however win the European Cup Super League meeting in June, reaching 16.99 metres. In 2007 he again failed to reach 17 metres, and again failed to reach the final of a major competition, this time at the 2007 World Championships.

2008 and 2009 would be marked by fruitful indoor seasons and fruitless outdoor seasons. He finished fourth in the final at the 2008 World Indoor Championships with a mark of 17.27 metres, but after with Fabio Martella he won the gold medal at the 2009 European Indoor Championships with a mark of 17.59 metres. These two marks were the season's best of the respective years. 17.59 was also a new championship record for the European Indoor Championships. In comparison, he only managed 16.91 outdoors in 2008 and only 15.81 outdoors in 2009. He had unsuccessful participations at the 2008 Olympic Games and the 2009 World Championships.

His personal best jump is still 17.60 metres, and 17.73 metres on the indoor track. He is the Italian record holder. In the long jump he has 8.00 metres outdoors, achieved in September 2006 in Busto Arsizio with the maximum possible wind assistance, and 8.03 metres indoors, achieved in February 2011 in Ancona.

At the 2012 Summer Olympics, he jumped 17.48 metres to win the bronze medal.

He's the husband of the former sprinter Patrizia Spuri.

== Achievements ==
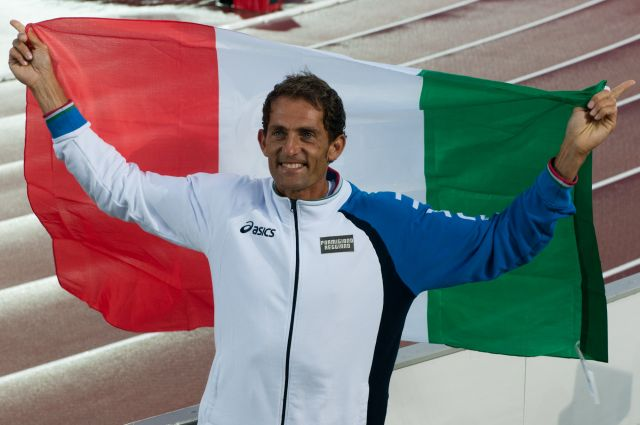
Donato after winning gold medal at the 2012 European Athletics Championships

Year	Competition	Venue	Position	Notes
Representing Italy
1995	European Junior Championships	Nyíregyháza, Hungary	5th	15.81 m
1997	European U23 Championships	Turku, Finland	11th	15.55 m (-2.0 m/s)
2000	European Indoor Championships	Ghent, Belgium	6th	16.57 m
2000	Olympic Games	Sydney, Australia	25th (q)	16.34 m
2001	World Indoor Championships	Lisbon, Portugal	6th	16.77 m
2001	Mediterranean Games	Radès, Tunisia	1st	17.05 m
2002	European Indoor Championships	Vienna, Austria	4th	16.90 m
2002	European Championships	Munich, Germany	4th	17.15 m
2003	World Championships	Paris, France	13th (q)	16.63 m
2004	World Indoor Championships	Budapest, Hungary	11th (q)	16.68 m
2004	Olympic Games	Athens, Greece	21st (q)	16.45 m
2006	World Indoor Championships	Moscow, Russia	17th (q)	16.35 m
2006	European Championships	Gothenburg, Sweden	16th (q)	16.66 m
2007	World Championships	Osaka, Japan	32nd (q)	16.20 m
2008	World Indoor Championships	Valencia, Spain	4th	17.27 m
2008	Olympic Games	Beijing, China	21st (q)	16.70 m
2009	European Indoor Championships	Turin, Italy	1st	17.59 m (iNR)
2009	World Championships	Berlin, Germany	41st (q)	15.81 m
2010	World Indoor Championships	Doha, Qatar	5th	16.88 m
2010	European Championships	Barcelona, Spain	9th	16.54 m
2011	European Indoor Championships	Paris, France	2nd	17.73 m (iNR)
2011	World Championships	Daegu, South Korea	10th	16.77 m
2012	World Indoor Championships	Istanbul, Turkey	4th	17.28 m
2012	European Championships	Helsinki, Finland	1st	17.63 m (w)
2012	Olympic Games	London, United Kingdom	3rd	17.48 m
2013	World Championships	Moscow, Russia	15th (q)	16.53 m
2014	European Championships	Zurich, Switzerland	7th	16.66 m
2016	Olympic Games	Rio de Janeiro, Brazil	17th (q)	16.54 m
2017	European Indoor Championships	Belgrade, Serbia	2nd	17.13 m (M40 WR)
2018	World Indoor Championships	Birmingham, United Kingdom	14th	15.96 m
2018	European Championships	Berlin, Germany	20th (q)	16.15 m
2019	European Indoor Championships	Glasgow, United Kingdom	18th (q)	15.93 m

== Progression ==
Personal Best
Top 10 World Rank

Year	Age	Indoor	Outdoor	Venue	Date	World Rank
2019	43	16.72 m		(Italy) Ancona	17 February	14
2019	43	.				
2018	42	16.94 m		(Italy) Ancona	18 February	12
2018	42		16.62 m	(Spain) Madrid	22 June	
2017	41	17.13 m		(Serbia) Beograd	5 March	6
2017	41		17.32 m	(France) Pierre-Bénite	9 June	4
2016	40	16.70 m		(Italy) Ancona	5 March	19
2016	40		16.93 m	(Italy) Rovereto	6 September	24
2015	39	16.74 m		(Italy) Ancona	31 January	19
2015	39		16.91 m	(Italy) Turin	26 July	31
2014	38	16.58 m		(Italy) Ancona	1 February	22
2014	38		16.89 m	(Italy) Rome	5 June	28
2013	37		16.86 m	(Switzerland) Lausanne	4 July	24
2012	36	17.28 m		(Turkey) Istanbul	11 March	4
2012	36		17.53 m	(Finland) Helsinki	29 June	4
2011	35	17.73 m		(France) Paris	6 March	2
2011	35		17.17 m	(Italy) Turin	26 June	17
2010	34	17.39 m		(Italy) Ancona	28 February	3
2010	34		17.08 m	(Italy) Turin	12 June	19
2009	33	17.59 m		(Italy) Turin	7 March	1
2009	33		15.81 m	(Germany) Berlin	16 August	289
2008	32	17.27 m		(Spain) Valencia	9 March	5
2008	32		16.91 m	(Italy) Florence	27 June	47
2007	31	16.93 m		(Italy) Ancona	18 February	15
2007	31		16.97 m	(Italy) Padua	28 July	33
2006	30	17.33 m		(Italy) Ancona	5 February	6
2006	30		17.24 m	(Italy) Turin	8 July	16
2005	29	16.57 m		(Italy) Ancona	20 February	28
2005	29		16.65 m	(Italy) Lignano	17 July	60
2004	28	16.69 m		(Italy) Genoa	22 February	27
2004	28		16.90 m	(Italy) Florence	11 July	41
2003	27	16.38 m		(Italy) Genoa	2 March	43
2003	27		17.16 m	(Italy) Florence	22 June	13
2002	26	17.03 m		(Italy) Genoa	17 February	6
2002	26		17.17 m	(France) Annecy	23 June	16
2001	25	16.94 m		(Italy) Turin	24 February	10
2001	25		17.05 m	(Tunisia) Tunis	11 September	19
2000	24	16.66 m		(Belgium) Ghent	26 February	31
2000	24		17.60 m	(Italy) Milan	7 June	2
1999	23	16.66 m		(Italy) Genoa	21 February	25
1999	23		16.21 m	(Italy) Pescara	11 September	138
1998	22	16.34 m		(Italy) Genoa	8 February	56
1998	22		16.73 m	(Italy) Rome	24 May	50
1997	21	16.37 m		(Italy) Genoa	23 February	54
1997	21		16.40 m	(South Africa) Pretoria	1 February	94
1996	20		16.35 m	(Italy) Milan	12 June	131
1995	19		15.81 m	(Hungary) Nyíregyháza	30 June	123
1994	18		15.27 m			
1993	17		14.36 m			

== National titles ==
He has won 23 times the individual national championship.

- 8 wins in the triple jump (2000, 2004, 2006, 2007, 2008, 2010, 2011, 2015)
- 3 wins in the long jump indoor (1999, 2011, 2012)
- 12 wins in the triple jump indoor (1998, 1999, 2001, 2002, 2003, 2004, 2006, 2007, 2008, 2009, 2010, 2018)

== See also ==
- Italian records in athletics
- Italian all-time lists – Triple jump
- Italian Athletics Championships – Multi winners
- World records in masters athletics – Triple jump
- Masters M40 triple jump world record progression
