= 2004 IAAF Golden League =

Athletics competition series

The 2004 IAAF Golden League was a series of track and field meetings organised by the International Association of Athletics Federations.

Originally taking place in Oslo, Rome, Monaco, Zürich, Brussels and Berlin, the Bislett Games was temporarily moved from Oslo to Fana (Bergen) due to the redevelopment of the Bislett stadion. The athletes (in selected events) who won their event at all six meetings took a share of a $1 million jackpot.

== Jackpot winners ==
Year	Winners	Event(s)
2004	Christian Olsson	triple jump
2004	Tonique Williams-Darling	400 m

== 2004 results ==
Golden background indicates selected Golden League event.

Event	Bislett Games June 11	Golden Gala July 2	Meeting Gaz de France July 23	Weltklasse Zürich August 6	Memorial van Damme September 3	ISTAF September 12
Men
100 m		Aziz Zakari (GHA) 10.10	Francis Obikwelu (POR) 10.06	Asafa Powell (JAM) 9.93	Asafa Powell (JAM) 9.87	
200 m	Shawn Crawford (USA) 20.31	Stéphan Buckland (MRI) 20.20	Francis Obikwelu (POR) 20.12	Bernard Williams (USA) 20.13	Frank Fredericks (NAM) 20.20	Asafa Powell (JAM) 20.24
400 m	Timothy Benjamin (GBR) 45.67		Leslie Djhone (FRA) 44.99		Otis Harris (GBR) 44.79	
800 m	Yuriy Borzakovskiy (RUS) 1:44.41	Wilson Kipketer (DEN) 1:43.88	William Yiampoy (KEN) 1:45.03	Wilfred Bungei (KEN) 1:43.06	Wilfred Bungei (KEN) 1:43.48	Yusuf Saad Kamel (BHR) 1:45.07
1500 m	Bernard Lagat (USA) 3:34.08	Rashid Ramzi (BHR) 3:30.25	Bernard Lagat (USA) 3:29.21	Bernard Lagat (USA) 3:27.40	Timothy Kiptanui (KEN) 3:30.24	Paul Korir (KEN) 3:32.46
3000 m					Eliud Kipchoge (KEN) 7:27.72	
5000 m	John Kibowen (KEN) 13:01.94	Eliud Kipchoge (KEN) 12:46.53		John Kibowen (KEN) 13:01.69		Augustine Kiprono Choge (KEN) 12:57.01
10,000 m					Ahmad Hassan Abdullah (QAT) 26:59.54	
110 m hurdles		Allen Johnson (USA) 13.11	Allen Johnson (USA) 13.07	Allen Johnson (USA) 13.13		Allen Johnson (USA) 13.16
400 m hurdles	Félix Sánchez (DOM) 48.54	Félix Sánchez (DOM) 48.43	Félix Sánchez (DOM) 47.99	Félix Sánchez (DOM) 47.92	Bayano Kamani (PAN) 48.30	Bayano Kamani (PAN) 48.55
3000 m steeplechase		Paul Kipsiele Koech (KEN) 7:59.65	Ezekiel Kemboi (KEN) 8:11.03	Saif Saaeed Shaheen (QAT) 8:00.60	Saif Saaeed Shaheen (QAT) 7:53.63 WR	
Triple jump	Christian Olsson (SWE) 17.58	Christian Olsson (SWE) 17.50	Christian Olsson (SWE) 17.41	Christian Olsson (SWE) 17.46	Christian Olsson (SWE) 17.44	Christian Olsson (SWE) 17.45
Pole vault		Aleksandr Averbukh (ISR) 5.67	Aleksandr Averbukh (ISR) 5.75	Timothy Mack (USA) 5.85		Timothy Mack (USA) 5.80
Shot put					Manuel Martínez (ESP) 21.15	
Discus throw	Virgilijus Alekna (LTU) 69.21	Virgilijus Alekna (LTU) 68.42	Virgilijus Alekna (LTU) 70.21	Róbert Fazekas (HUN) 69.77	Virgilijus Alekna (LTU) 69.03	Virgilijus Alekna (LTU) 68.12
Javelin throw	Breaux Greer (USA) 87.39			Breaux Greer (USA) 86.52		
Women
100 m	LaTasha Colander (USA) 11.28	Yulia Nestsiarenka (BLR) 11.13	Christine Arron (FRA) 11.10	Christine Arron (FRA) 11.06	Aleen Bailey (JAM) 11.08	Debbie Ferguson-McKenzie (BAH) 11.14
200 m			Muna Lee (USA) 22.49		Kim Gevaert (BEL) 22.58	
400 m	Tonique Williams-Darling (BAH) 49.78	Tonique Williams-Darling (BAH) 49.25	Tonique Williams-Darling (BAH) 49.15	Tonique Williams-Darling (BAH) 49.73	Tonique Williams-Darling (BAH) 49.59	Tonique Williams-Darling (BAH) 49.07
800 m		Jolanda Čeplak (SLO) 1:57.68		Maria de Lurdes Mutola (MOZ) 1:57.47		
1500 m	Iryna Lishchynska (UKR) 4:03.76	Olga Yegorova (RUS) 4:01.15	Judit Varga (HUN) 4:03.92	Wioletta Janowska (POL)4:03.09	Tatyana Tomashova (RUS) 4:02.27	Tatyana Tomashova (RUS) 4:04.41
3000 m / 5000 m	Elvan Abeylegesse (TUR) 14:24.68 WR (5000 m)	Ejegayehu Dibaba (ETH) 14:37.99 (5000 m)	Isabella Ochichi (KEN) 8:31.32 (3000 m)	Edith Masai (KEN) 8:36.43 (3000 m)	Edith Masai (KEN) 14:42.64 (5000 m)	Berhane Adere (ETH) 14:58.89 (5000 m)
100 m hurdles	Gail Devers (USA) 12.56	Glory Alozie (ESP) 12.69	Perdita Felicien (CAN) 12.60	Perdita Felicien (CAN) 12.52	Mariya Koroteyeva (RUS) 12.78	Joanna Hayes (USA) 12.46
400 m hurdles		Jana Rawlinson (AUS) 54.05		Sandra Glover (USA) 53.50		
Long jump		Tatyana Lebedeva (RUS) 7.01				Tatyana Lebedeva (RUS) 6.89
High jump	Hestrie Cloete (RSA) 1.98	Hestrie Cloete (RSA) 2.03	Hestrie Cloete (RSA) 1.99	Hestrie Cloete (RSA) 2.04	Yelena Slesarenko (RUS) 2.00	Yelena Slesarenko (RUS) 2.00
Pole vault					Yelena Isinbayeva (RUS) 4.92 WR	
Shot put						Nadzeya Ostapchuk (BLR) 20.36
Hammer throw			Yipsi Moreno (CUB) 72.43			
Javelin throw						Osleidys Menéndez (CUB) 65.98
