= Athletics at the 2004 Summer Olympics – Men's triple jump =

Men's triple jump at the Games of the XXVIII Olympiad
- Pictogram for athletics
- Venue: Olympic Stadium
- Dates: 20–22 August
- Competitors: 47 from 35 nations
- Winning distance: 17.79

Medalists
1st place, gold medalist(s)		Christian Olsson; Sweden
2nd place, silver medalist(s)		Marian Oprea; Romania
3rd place, bronze medalist(s)		Danil Burkenya; Russia

The men's triple jump competition at the 2004 Summer Olympics in Athens was held at the Olympic Stadium on 20–22 August. Forty-seven athletes from 35 nations competed. The event was won by Christian Olsson of Sweden, the nation's first victory in the event since 1948 and third overall. Marian Oprea won Romania's first men's triple jump medal with his silver. Russia earned bronze for the second consecutive Games, this time with Danil Burkenya taking the medal.

== Background ==
This was the 25th appearance of the event, which is one of 12 athletics events to have been held at every Summer Olympics. The returning finalists from the 2000 Games were fourth-place finisher Yoelbi Quesada of Cuba, sixth-place finisher Phillips Idowu of Great Britain, tenth-place finisher Andrew Murphy of Australia, eleventh-place finisher Walter Davis of the United States, and twelfth-place finisher Charles Friedek of Germany. Christian Olsson of Sweden was the reigning (2003) world champion and had also finished second in 2001; he was the favorite.

Belarus, Burkina Faso, Estonia, Grenada, Moldova, Qatar, Slovenia, Syria, and Trinidad and Tobago each made their first appearance in the event. The United States competed for the 24th time, having missed only the boycotted 1980 Games.

== Qualification ==
The qualification period for Athletics was 1 January 2003 to 9 August 2004. For the men's triple jump, each National Olympic Committee was permitted to enter up to three athletes that had jumped 16.95 metres or further during the qualification period. The maximum number of athletes per nation had been set at 3 since the 1930 Olympic Congress. If an NOC had no athletes that qualified under that standard, one athlete that had jumped 16.55 metres or further could be entered.

== Competition format ==
The competition consisted of two rounds, qualification and final. In qualification, each athlete jumped three times (stopping early if they made the qualifying distance). At least the top twelve athletes moved on to the final; if more than twelve reached the qualifying distance, all who did so advanced. Distances were reset for the final round. Finalists jumped three times, after which the eight best jumped three more times (with the best distance of the six jumps counted).

== Records ==
Prior to the competition, the existing world record, Olympic record, and world leading jump were as follows:

World record	Jonathan Edwards (GBR)	18.29	Gothenburg, Sweden	7 August 1995
Olympic record	Kenny Harrison (USA)	18.09	Atlanta, United States	27 July 1996
World Leading	Christian Olsson (SWE)	17.83 i	Budapest, Hungary	7 March 2004

No new world or Olympic records were set during the competition. The following national record was set during the competition:

Nation	Athlete	Round	Distance
Sweden	Christian Olsson	Final	17.79

== Schedule ==
All times are Greece Standard Time (UTC+2)

Date	Time	Round
Friday, 20 August 2004	09:55	Qualifying
Sunday, 22 August 2004	20:10	Final

== Results ==
=== Qualifying ===
Rule: Qualifying standard 17.00 (Q) or at least best 12 qualified (q).

Rank	Group	Athlete	Nation	1	2	3	Distance	Notes
1	A	Christian Olsson	Sweden	17.68	—	—	17.68	Q
2	B	Yoandri Betanzos	Cuba	17.53	—	—	17.53	Q, PB
3	B	Marian Oprea	Romania	17.44	—	—	17.44	Q
4	A	Phillips Idowu	Great Britain	17.33	—	—	17.33	Q
5	B	Jadel Gregório	Brazil	17.20	—	—	17.20	Q
6	B	Viktor Gushchinskiy	Russia	16.71	—	17.17	17.17	Q
7	A	Danil Burkenya	Russia	16.77	16.91	17.08	17.08	Q
8	A	Hristos Meletoglou	Greece	16.75	16.50	17.06	17.06	Q, SB
9	A	Yoelbi Quesada	Cuba	16.89	X	17.01	17.01	Q
10	B	Kenta Bell	United States	16.77	16.82	16.98	16.98	q
11	A	Walter Davis	United States	16.28	14.77	16.94	16.94	q
12	A	Julien Kapek	France	16.67	X	16.91	16.91	q
13	B	Nathan Douglas	Great Britain	16.84	X	X	16.84	
14	A	Andrew Murphy	Australia	16.59	16.82	X	16.82	
15	B	Li Yanxi	China	X	16.70	16.74	16.74	
16	A	Ibrahim Mohamdein Aboubaker	Qatar	15.98	16.37	16.71	16.71	
17	B	Arnie David Giralt	Cuba	X	16.63	16.70	16.70	
18	B	Melvin Lister	United States	16.62	X	16.64	16.64	
19	A	Andrew Owusu	Ghana	15.85	X	16.64	16.64	SB
20	A	Mykola Savolaynen	Ukraine	16.56	16.48	15.57	16.56	
21	B	Fabrizio Donato	Italy	16.16	16.45	16.34	16.45	
22	B	Momchil Karailiev	Bulgaria	X	16.45	X	16.45	
23	B	Viktor Yastrebov	Ukraine	16.43	16.32	X	16.43	
24	A	Ivaylo Rusenov	Bulgaria	16.39	X	X	16.39	
25	B	Mohammad Hazzory	Syria	16.37	X	16.14	16.37	
26	A	Péter Tölgyesi	Hungary	16.33	15.74	16.36	16.36	
27	A	Leevan Sands	Bahamas	X	X	16.35	16.35	
28	A	Randy Lewis	Grenada	X	X	16.33	16.33	
29	B	Godfrey Khotso Mokoena	South Africa	16.23	16.32	X	16.32	
30	B	Dmitrij Vaľukevič	Belarus	X	X	16.32	16.32	
31	B	Andreas Pohle	Germany	X	16.29	16.23	16.29	
32	B	Vladimir Letnicov	Moldova	X	15.88	16.25	16.25	
33	B	Lauri Leis	Estonia	X	16.06	16.18	16.18	
34	A	Aliaksandar Hlavatski	Belarus	16.18	15.73	X	16.18	
35	B	Salem Mouled Al-Ahmadi	Saudi Arabia	16.16	16.03	X	16.16	
36	A	LeJuan Simon	Trinidad and Tobago	X	14.75	16.16	16.16	
37	B	Boštjan Šimunič	Slovenia	X	X	16.07	16.07	
38	B	Takanori Sugibayashi	Japan	15.38	15.67	15.95	15.95	
39	B	Park Hyung-jun	South Korea	X	15.84	X	15.84	
40	B	Nelson Évora	Portugal	15.72	15.84	X	15.72	
41	A	Olivier Sanou	Burkina Faso	X	15.67	X	15.67	
42	B	Karl Taillepierre	France	15.50	X	X	15.50	
43	A	Armen Martirosyan	Armenia	15.05	X	X	15.05	
—	A	Charles Friedek	Germany	X	—	—	No mark	
—	A	Vitaliy Moskalenko	Russia	X	X	X	No mark	
—	A	Berk Tuna	Turkey	X	X	—	No mark	
—	A	Roman Valiyev	Kazakhstan	X	X	X	No mark	
—	A	Sergey Bochkov	Azerbaijan	DNS				

=== Final ===
Rank	Athlete	Nation	1	2	3	4	5	6	Distance	Notes
1st place, gold medalist(s)	Christian Olsson	Sweden	17.69	17.79	17.69	16.82	17.58	—	17.79	NR
2nd place, silver medalist(s)	Marian Oprea	Romania	17.55	X	17.47	17.34	—	17.38	17.55	SB
3rd place, bronze medalist(s)	Danil Burkenya	Russia	16.99	16.68	16.16	17.45	17.48	17.47	17.48	
4	Yoandri Betanzos	Cuba	X	17.47	X	X	17.24	X	17.47	
5	Jadel Gregório	Brazil	17.22	17.27	15.97	X	16.82	17.31	17.31	
6	Hristos Meletoglou	Greece	17.13	X	17.10	17.05	16.65	17.06	17.13	SB
7	Viktor Gushchinskiy	Russia	X	X	17.11	16.27	16.95	X	17.11	
8	Yoelbi Quesada	Cuba	16.93	X	16.96	X	X	—	16.96	
9	Kenta Bell	United States	16.90	X	16.39	Did not advance			16.90	
10	Julien Kapek	France	X	16.79	16.81	Did not advance			16.81	
11	Walter Davis	United States	16.78	16.65	16.59	Did not advance			16.78	
—	Phillips Idowu	Great Britain	X	X	X	Did not advance			No mark	
