= Marian Oprea =

Romanian triple jumper (born 1982)

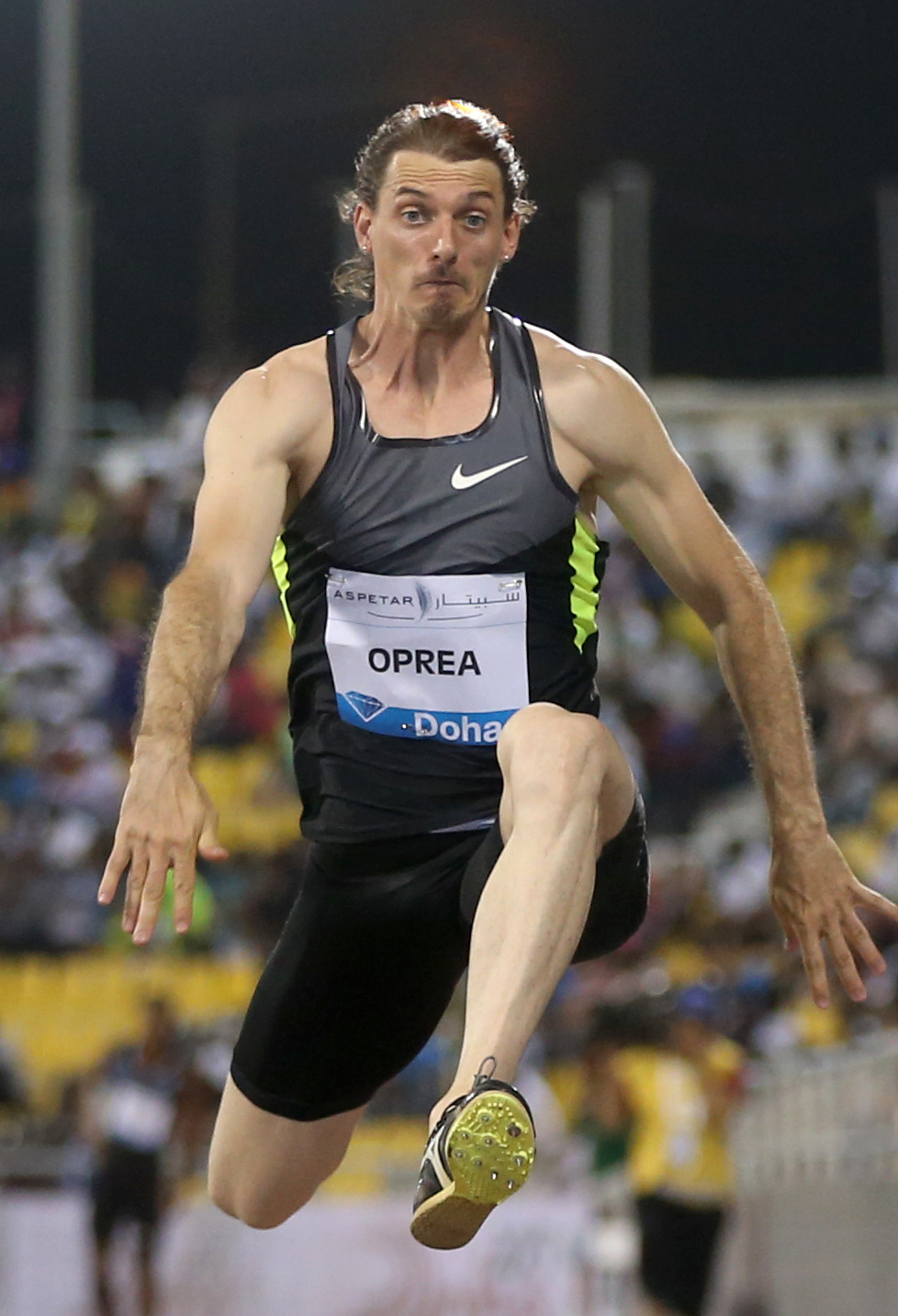
- Marian Oprea in 2015

Personal information
- Born: 6 June 1982 (age 44) Pitești, Romania
- Height: 1.90 m (6 ft 3 in)
- Weight: 77 kg (170 lb)

Sport
- Sport: Triple jump
- Club: Rapid București; CSM Arad
Medal record
Representing Romania
Olympic Games
Silver medal – second place	2004 Athens	Triple jump
World Championships
Bronze medal – third place	2005 Helsinki	Triple jump
World Indoor Championships
Bronze medal – third place	2014 Sopot	Triple jump
European Championships
Silver medal – second place	2010 Barcelona	Triple jump
Bronze medal – third place	2006 Gothenburg	Triple jump
European Indoor Championships
Silver medal – second place	2002 Vienna	Triple jump
Bronze medal – third place	2011 Paris	Triple jump
Bronze medal – third place	2015 Prague	Triple jump
Summer Universiade
Silver medal – second place	2001 Beijing	Triple jump
Continental Cup
Gold medal – first place	2010 Split	Triple jump

Marian Oprea (born 6 June 1982) is a Romanian athlete, competing in triple jump, who won the silver medal at the 2004 Olympic Games. His personal best is 17.81 meters.

Oprea was born in Piteşti. He took his first major medal at the 2000 World Junior Championships in Athletics, winning the gold with a jump of 16.41 m. Oprea won the bronze medal in the triple jump at the 2005 World Athletics Championships in Helsinki and also at the 2006 European Athletics Championships in Gothenburg.

He suffered a serious knee injury (tendonitis) and missed the 2009 World Championships in Athletics as a result. He opted to undergo major surgery and brought an end to a two-year-long injury hiatus with a jump of 16.88 m in May 2010. He proved himself to return to peak fitness with a silver medal performance at the 2010 European Athletics Championships (jumping 17.51 m) and then taking the gold medal at the 2010 IAAF Continental Cup later that season.

== Achievements ==
Year	Competition	Venue	Position	Notes
Representing Romania
1999	World Youth Championships	Bydgoszcz, Poland	4th	15.70 m
1999	European Junior Championships	Riga, Latvia	3rd	15.98 m
2000	World Junior Championships	Santiago, Chile	1st	16.41 m
2001	European Junior Championships	Grosseto, Italy	1st	16.65 m
2001	World Championships	Edmonton, Canada	13th (q)	16.62 m
2001	Universiade	Beijing, China	2nd	17.11 m
2002	European Indoor Championships	Vienna, Austria	2nd	17.22 m
2002	European Championships	Munich, Germany	14th (q)	16.47 m
2003	World Indoor Championships	Birmingham, United Kingdom	8th	16.59 m
2003	European U23 Championships	Bydgoszcz, Poland	2nd	17.28 m
2003	World Championships	Paris, France	17th (q)	16.55 m
2004	World Indoor Championships	Budapest, Hungary	5th	17.19 m
2004	Olympic Games	Athens, Greece	2nd	17.55 m
2005	World Championships	Helsinki, Finland	3rd	17.40 m
2006	World Indoor Championships	Moscow, Russia	4th	17.34 m
2006	European Championships	Gothenburg, Sweden	3rd	17.18 m
2008	Olympic Games	Beijing, China	5th	17.22 m
2010	European Championships	Barcelona, Spain	2nd	17.51 m
2011	European Indoor Championships	Paris, France	3rd	17.62 m
2011	World Championships	Daegu, South Korea	15th (q)	16.61 m
2012	World Indoor Championships	Istanbul, Turkey	11th (q)	16.58 m
2012	European Championships	Helsinki, Finland	19th (q)	16.17 m
2013	World Championships	Moscow, Russia	6th	16.82 m
2014	World Indoor Championships	Sopot, Poland	3rd	17.21 m
2014	European Championships	Zürich, Switzerland	5th	16.94 m
2015	European Indoor Championships	Prague, Czech Republic	3rd	16.91 m
2015	World Championships	Beijing, China	6th	17.06 m
2016	World Indoor Championships	Portland, United States	10th	16.27 m
2016	European Championships	Amsterdam, Netherlands	27th (q)	15.40 m
2016	Olympic Games	Rio de Janeiro, Brazil	–	NM
2018	European Championships	Berlin, Germany	21st (q)	15.93 m
