= Randy Lewis (triple jumper) =

Grenadian athlete (born 1978)

Personal information
- Born: 15 November 1978 (age 47) Saint Andrew, Grenada

Sport
- Sport: Track and field
- Club: Wichita State Shockers
Medal record
Representing Grenada
Central American and Caribbean Games
| Silver medal – second place | 2010 Mayaguez | Triple jump |
CARIFTA Games Junior (U20)
| Silver medal – second place | 1997 Bridgetown | Triple jump |
| Bronze medal – third place | 1996 Kingston | Triple jump |

Randy Lewis (born 15 November 1978) is a Grenadian athlete competing in the triple jump. He represented Grenada at the 2004 and 2008 Summer Olympics, and has also competed at World Championship level indoors and outdoors. He won the bronze medal at the 2008 IAAF World Athletics Final. His personal best jump is 17.49 metres, achieved in May 2008 in São Paulo. This is the current Grenadian record.

Lewis attended Wichita State University where he is in the Hall of Fame for Track and Field. He won four individual titles in the Missouri Valley Conference and he is a three-time NCAA All-American. He also currently owns the triple jump records (indoor and outdoor) at Wichita State University.

He is coached by Gerd Osenberg, the former coach of Ulrike Meyfarth.

== Achievements ==
| Year | Competition | Venue | Position | Event | Notes |
|---|---|---|---|---|---|
| 1996 | CARIFTA Games (U20) | Kingston, Jamaica | 7th | Long jump | 7.09 m |
| 1996 | CARIFTA Games (U20) | Kingston, Jamaica | 3rd | Triple jump | 14.97 m |
| 1997 | CARIFTA Games (U20) | Bridgetown, Barbados | 5th | Long jump | 7.11 m |
| 1997 | CARIFTA Games (U20) | Bridgetown, Barbados | 2nd | Triple jump | 15.66 m (w) |
| 2002 | Commonwealth Games | Manchester, United Kingdom | 8th | Long jump | 7.63 m |
| 2004 | Olympic Games | Athens, Greece | 28th (q) | Triple jump | 16.33 m |
| 2005 | Central American and Caribbean Championships | Nassau, Bahamas | 5th | Triple jump | 16.83 m (w) |
| 2005 | World Championships | Helsinki, Finland | 24th (q) | Triple jump | 16.11 m |
| 2006 | Commonwealth Games | Melbourne, Australia | 6th | Triple jump | 16.53 m |
| 2006 | World Athletics Final | Stuttgart, Germany | 7th | Triple jump | |
| 2007 | Pan American Games | Rio de Janeiro, Brazil | 7th | Triple jump | 16.42 m |
| 2007 | World Athletics Final | Stuttgart, Germany | 4th | Triple jump | |
| 2008 | World Indoor Championships | Valencia, Spain | 9th (q) | Triple jump | 16.77 m |
| 2008 | Summer Olympics | Beijing, China | 15th (q) | Triple jump | 17.06 m |
| 2008 | World Athletics Final | Stuttgart, Germany | 3rd | Triple jump | |
| 2009 | World Championships | Berlin, Germany | 18th (q) | Triple jump | 16.73 m |
| 2009 | World Athletics Final | Thessaloniki, Greece | 7th | Triple jump | 16.46 m |
| 2010 | World Indoor Championships | Doha, Qatar | 17th (q) | Triple jump | 16.28 m |
| 2010 | Central American and Caribbean Games | Mayagüez, Puerto Rico | 2nd | Triple jump | 17.20 m |
| 2010 | Commonwealth Games | Delhi, India | 6th | Triple jump | 16.73 m |
