= Aliaksandar Hlavatski =

Belarusian athlete

Personal information
- Born: 2 May 1970 (age 56) Salihorsk, Soviet Union

Sport
- Sport: Track and field
Medal record
Representing Belarus
European Indoor Championships
Bronze medal – third place	2002 Vienna	Triple jump

Aliaksandar Hlavatski (Belarusian: Аляксандар Главацкі; born 2 May 1970) is a former Belarusian athlete who specialized in both long jump and triple jump.

His personal best jumps in the two events are 8.33 and 17.53 metres respectively.

== Achievements ==
Year	Competition	Venue	Position	Event	Notes
Representing Belarus
1993	Universiade	Buffalo, United States	6th (q)	Long jump	7.77 m^{1}
1993	World Championships	Stuttgart, Germany	7th	Long jump	7.95 m
1994	European Championships	Helsinki, Finland	10th	Long jump	7.82 m (wind: +0.8 m/s)
1995	Universiade	Fukuoka, Japan	5th	Long jump	8.08 m w
1996	Olympic Games	Atlanta, United States	7th	Long jump	8.07 m
1997	World Indoor Championships	Paris, France	9th	Long jump	7.98 m
1997	World Championships	Athens, Greece	6th	Long jump	8.03 m
1998	European Championships	Budapest, Hungary	4th	Triple jump	17.22 m
2001	World Indoor Championships	Lisbon, Portugal	8th	Triple jump	16.49 m
2002	European Indoor Championships	Vienna, Austria	3rd	Triple jump	17.05 m
2002	European Championships	Munich, Germany	6th	Triple jump	16.86 m
2003	World Indoor Championships	Birmingham, England	7th	Triple jump	16.66 m
2003	World Championships	Paris, France	11th	Triple jump	16.40 m

^{1}No mark in the final
