= Danil Burkenya =

Russian track and field athlete

Daniil Sergeyevich Burkenya (Russian: Даниил Серге́евич Буркеня; born July 20, 1978, in Ashgabat, Turkmen SSR) is a Russian track and field athlete who competes mainly in triple jump. He was a long jumper before taking up triple jumping in 2004, and the same year he won the bronze medal in the 2004 Summer Olympics.

== International competitions ==
Representing Russia
Year	Competition	Venue	Position	Event	Notes
1999	European U23 Championships	Gothenburg, Sweden	7th	Long jump	7.81 m (wind: +1.1 m/s)
2000	Olympic Games	Sydney, Australia	26th (q)	Long jump	7.79 m
2002	European Championships	Munich, Germany	5th	Long jump	7.90 m
2004	World Indoor Championships	Budapest, Hungary	7th	Triple jump	16.62 m
2004	Olympic Games	Athens, Greece	3rd	Triple jump	17.48 m
2004	World Athletics Final	Monte Carlo, Monaco	2nd	Triple jump	17.20 m
2005	World Athletics Final	Monte Carlo, Monaco	4th	Triple jump	17.10 m
2006	European Championships	Gothenburg, Sweden	6th	Triple jump	16.98 m

== Personal bests ==
- Long jump - 8.31 m (2001)
- Triple jump - 17.68 m (2004)
