= Vitaliy Moskalenko =

Russian triple jumper (born 1974)

Vitaliy Moskalenko (Russian: Виталий Москаленко; born 30 June 1974) is a Russian triple jumper.

He competed at the 2003 World Championships and the 2004 Olympic Games without reaching the final.

His personal best jump is 17.17 metres, achieved in August 2003 in Tula.
