= Viljo Nousiainen =

Finnish athletics coach (1944–1999)

Viljo Nousiainen (9 March 1944 – 11 June 1999) was a Finnish athletics coach.

== Career ==
Nousiainen was born in Kiuruvesi. As an athletics coach, he specialized in training jumpers for Örgryte IS Sports Club in Gothenburg during the 1970s. He is best known as the coach and stepfather of Swedish world record high jumper Patrik Sjöberg. His other noted trainees were high jumpers Yannick Tregaro and Stefan Holm and triple jumper Christian Olsson. He died in Gothenburg, Sweden.

== Scandal ==
In April 2011, Sjöberg and Tregaro revealed they had been sexually molested as children by Nousiainen. Sjöberg recounted Nousiainen's abuse in his biography Det du inte såg ("What you didn't see"). In 2009, Norwegian athlete Christian Skaar Thomassen, contacted his friend Sjöberg and told him that Nousiainen had also molested him when he was 11 years old. That conversation was the starting point for the book.

== See also ==
- USA Gymnastics sex abuse scandal
