= Yannick Tregaro =

Swedish athletics coach (born 1978)

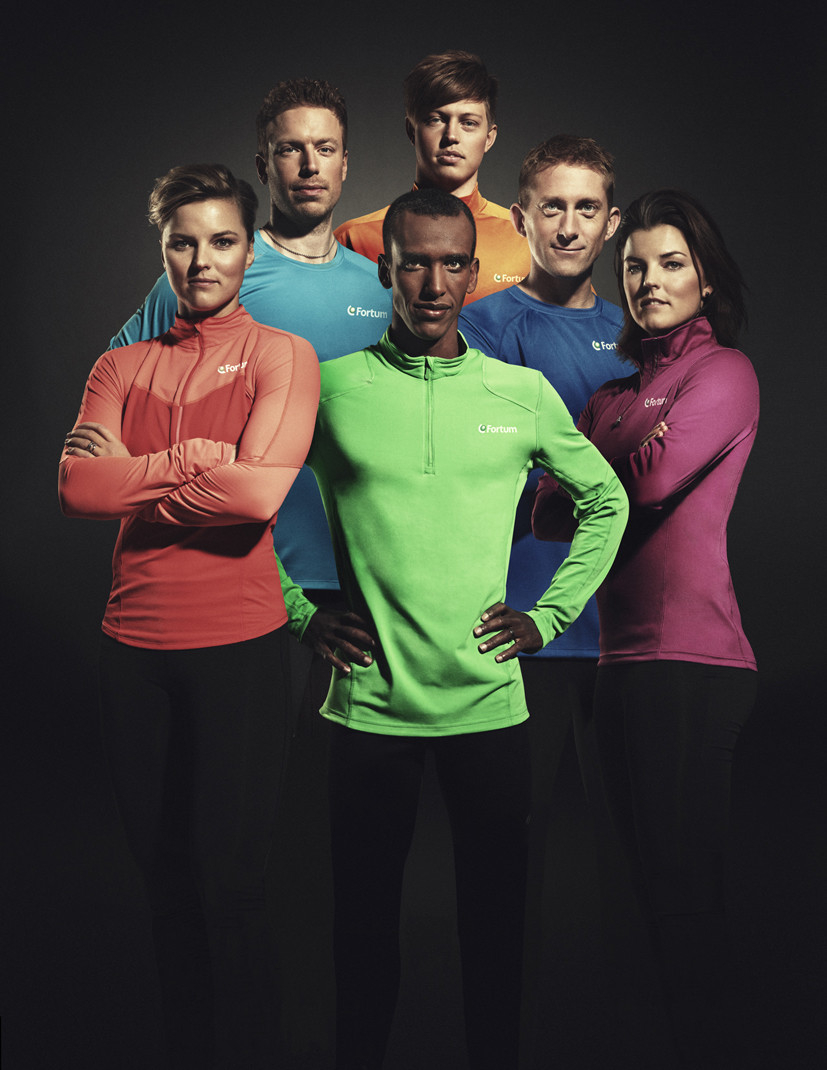

Yannick Tregaro (born 26 March 1978 in Gunnared) is a Swedish athletics coach.

== Early career ==
Tregaro was a prospective high jumper, who placed 10th in the final of the high jump at the 1996 World Junior Championships. His coach was Viljo Nousiainen. Nousiainen died in 1999. This left Tregaro and the young triple jumper Christian Olsson without a coach. This led to Yannick's decision to begin coaching, his first athlete being the young Olsson. This would go on to become a highly successful partnership.

== Coaching ==
Olsson first achieved prominence as an athlete when he won a silver medal at the 2001 World Championships in Athletics in Edmonton. Tregaro coached Olsson to a gold medal in the 2003 World Championships in Athletics held in Paris leading to Olsson winning the Waterford Crystal European Athlete of the Year Trophy for 2003.

In 2004, Tregaro coached Olsson to a gold medal in the Triple Jump at the Athens Olympics. Earlier that year, Olsson equalled world indoor record in winning a gold medal at the 2004 World Indoor Championships in Athletics. Olsson's feats lead him to win the Waterford Crystal European Athlete of the Year for a second successive year.

From autumn of 2003 until her retirement in 2008, Tregaro coached Swedish high jumper Kajsa Bergqvist who earlier in 2003 had won a high jump gold medal at the 2003 IAAF World Indoor Championships. Bergqvist tore her Achilles tendon in July 2004, making her ineligible for the Athens Olympics. She made a comeback to win a gold medal in the high jump at the 2005 World Championships in Athletics.

Tregaro coached several promising Swedish athletes, foremost his now ex-wife (between 2011 and 2014) Emma Green who won a silver medal at the 2010 European Athletics Championships in Barcelona and a bronze medal at the 2005 World Championships in Athletics.
