= Dmitrij Vaľukevič =

Belarusian-born Slovak triple jumper (born 1981)

Dmitrij Vaľukevič (Belarusian: Дзьмітры Валюкевіч; born 31 May 1981 in Petrozavodsk) is a Belarusian-born Slovak triple jumper. He is son of Gennadiy Valyukevich.

== Achievements ==
Year	Competition	Venue	Position	Event	Notes
Representing Belarus
2000	World Junior Championships	Santiago, Chile	9th	Triple jump	16.05 m (wind: +1.5 m/s)
2001	European U23 Championships	Amsterdam, Netherlands	5th	Triple jump	16.57 m (wind: 0.3 m/s)
2003	European U23 Championships	Bydgoszcz, Poland	1st	Triple jump	17.57 (wind: 0.2 m/s)
2003	World Championships	Paris, France	16th (q)	Triple jump	16.59
2004	World Indoor Championships	Budapest, Hungary	4th	Triple jump	17.22
2004	Olympic Games	Athens, Greece	30th	Triple jump	16.32
Representing Slovakia
2005	World Championships	Helsinki, Finland	10th	Triple jump	16.79
2006	European Championships	Gothenburg, Sweden	15th (q)	Triple jump	16.67
2007	World Championships	Osaka, Japan	13th (q)	Triple jump	16.65
2008	World Indoor Championships	Valencia, Spain	5th	Triple jump	17.14
2008	Olympic Games	Beijing, China	14th (q)	Triple jump	17.08
2009	World Championships	Berlin, Germany	12th	Triple jump	16.54
2010	World Indoor Championships	Doha, Qatar	7th	Triple jump	16.72
2010	European Championships	Barcelona, Spain	7th	Triple jump	16.77
