= Kenta Bell =

American track and field athlete

Personal information
- Born: March 16, 1977 (age 49) Kilgore, Texas, United States

Sport
- Sport: Track and field
Medal record
Representing United States
Summer Universiade
Gold medal – first place	2001 Beijing	Triple jump

Kenwood Kenta Bell (born March 16, 1977) is an American track and field athlete who competed mainly in the triple jump. He won this event at the 2001 Universiade and the 2003 national championship. Bell has also finished third in two IAAF World Athletics Finals.

He has also competed at the larger competitions such as the 2003 World Championships, the 2004 Summer Olympics and the 2005 World Championships where he finished 6th, 9th and 7th respectively.

He received a three-month doping ban after a positive test for methylprednisolone at the 2007 USA Outdoor Track and Field Championships.

He is a 2001 graduate of Northwestern State University in Natchitoches, Louisiana.

Bell placed second in the Olympic trials and competed in the 2008 Olympic Games, where he finished 25th in the qualifying stage.

Bell received a lifetime ban for engaging in and orchestrating prohibited doping conduct from USADA on November 7, 2017.

== Personal bests ==
- Long jump – 8.07 m (2000)
- Triple jump – 17.73 m (2002)

== Achievements ==
Year	Competition	Venue	Position	Notes
Representing the United States
2001	Summer Universiade	Beijing, China	1st	17.22 m
2003	World Athletics Final	Monte Carlo, Monaco	3rd	
2004	World Athletics Final	Monte Carlo, Monaco	3rd	

== See also ==
- List of doping cases in athletics
