= Christian Olsson =

Swedish triple jumper (born 1980)

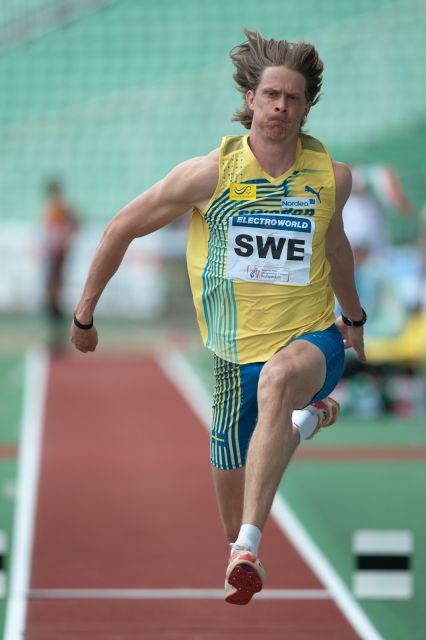
- Christian Olsson during the European Team Championships in Budapest, Hungary in June 2010

Personal information
- Full name: John Christian Bert Olsson
- Born: 25 January 1980 (age 46) Gothenburg, Sweden
- Height: 1.92 m (6 ft 3 1/2 in)
- Weight: 73 kg (161 lb)

Sport
- Country: Sweden
- Events: Triple jump, High jump
- Club: Örgryte IS

Achievements and titles
- Personal bests: 17.79 m 17.83 m (indoors)
Medal record
Event	1st	2nd	3rd
Olympic Games	1	0	0
World Championships	1	1	0
World Indoor Championships	2	0	0
European Championships	2	0	0
European Indoor Championships	1	0	0
Total	7	1	0
Olympic Games
Gold medal – first place	2004 Athens	Triple jump
World Championships
Gold medal – first place	2003 Paris	Triple jump
Silver medal – second place	2001 Edmonton	Triple jump
World Indoor Championships
Gold medal – first place	2003 Birmingham	Triple jump
Gold medal – first place	2004 Budapest	Triple jump
European Championships
Gold medal – first place	2002 Munich	Triple jump
Gold medal – first place	2006 Gothenburg	Triple jump
European Indoor Championships
Gold medal – first place	2002 Vienna	Triple jump

Christian Olsson (born 25 January 1980) is a former Swedish athlete competing in high jump and triple jump. He won an Olympic gold medal, one gold and one silver medal in the World Championships and two gold medals in the European Championships as well as a further two golds in the World Indoor championships. He also won the overall IAAF Golden League jackpot in 2004 where he cashed in 500,000 US dollars (after splitting the million dollar pot with Tonique Williams-Darling).

From 2007 to his retirement in 2012, he was beset by injuries which left him largely on the sidelines and unable to compete at top level competitions.

== Biography ==
Olsson was born in Gothenburg, and made his international breakthrough in 2001 when he won silver at the 2001 World Championships in Athletics. He has the Swedish national record outdoors, 17.79 m (2004 Summer Olympics), and the Swedish national record indoors, 17.83 m (2004). Olsson has won the Swedish Championships seven times, and has also competed successfully on national level in high jumping.

On 7 March 2004, at the 2004 World Indoor Championships in Athletics, he jumped 17.83 m and matched the World Record. On 23 August 2004, at the 2004 Summer Olympics, he jumped 17.79 m, broke the national record and won the gold medal as the first Swede since Gustaf Lindblom in 1912, 92 years earlier. Four of his six jumps were longer than the silver medalist's best jump.

With the Olympic Gold he completed an international sweep, having the Olympic, World Indoor, Outdoor, Regional (European) Indoor and Outdoor titles.

Olsson first became interested in triple jump after watching Jonathan Edwards set the world record at the World Championships in his hometown Gothenburg. Since 1999, Olsson has been trained by Yannick Tregaro. Before that, Olsson was trained by Viljo Nousiainen.

During the autumn and winter 2004/2005 he injured his foot (an injury originating from the 2004 Olympic Final), preventing him from being able to do triple-jumping at full speed. Unfortunately the injury healed very slowly, and it was still in January 2006 hampering him. In his first competition after the injury, in June 2006, he jumped 17.09 and seem to be back into shape. A month later he won the gold medal at European Championships in his hometown Gothenburg, with a jump of 17.67 m.

At the beginning of the 2007 indoor season, Olsson was injured yet again, and was unable to compete at the European indoor championships.

Olsson returned to competition in June at the IAAF Golden League event in Oslo, jumping 17.33 m. In July, he won Golden League event in Paris with 17.56 m. At the Golden League event in Rome, he retired after the second round due to a cramp.

Olsson went to the 2007 World Championships in Athletics but had to pull out before the competition due to an injury during training.

After almost one year of rehabilitation, he returned to competition in July 2008 at the annual event in Stockholm, "DN Galan", but had to pull out due to injury. Afterwards, he announced that he would not compete anymore during the 2008 season; hence he would not participate in the Beijing Olympics. He also suggested that he might retire from the sport. Upon a request from the Swedish Olympic team, Olsson agreed to carry the Swedish flag during the opening ceremony.

In July 2009, Olsson made a comeback in a minor event arranged by Örgryte IS in Gothenburg. He then jumped 17.24 m.

On 3 August 2009 Olsson competed in Swedish Championships in Malmö. He won the competition with a jump at 16.72 m. This was the first competition Olsson failed to reach 17 m or more since he jumped in a competition in Birmingham in 2003.

On 14 May 2012, Olsson ultimately declared his intentions to retire from professional triple jump competitions.

Christian Olsson lives with his family in Lindome, south of Gothenburg.

== Competition record ==
Year	Competition	Venue	Position	Event	Notes
Representing Sweden
1999	European Junior Championships	Riga, Latvia	1st	High jump	2.21 m
1999	European Junior Championships	Riga, Latvia	2nd	Triple jump	16.18 m
2000	European Indoor Championships	Ghent, Belgium	22nd (q)	Triple jump	15.95 m
2000	Olympic Games	Sydney, Australia	17th (q)	Triple jump	16.64 m
2001	European U23 Championships	Amsterdam, Netherlands	1st	Triple jump	17.24 m (wind: -0.8 m/s)
2001	World Championships	Edmonton, Canada	2nd	Triple jump	17.47 m
2001	Goodwill Games	Brisbane, Australia	2nd	Triple jump	16.85 m
2002	European Indoor Championships	Vienna, Austria	1st	Triple jump	17.54 m
2002	European Championships	Munich, Germany	1st	Triple jump	17.53 m
2003	World Indoor Championships	Birmingham, United Kingdom	1st	Triple jump	17.70 m
2003	World Championships	Paris, France	1st	Triple jump	17.72 m
2004	World Indoor Championships	Budapest, Hungary	1st	Triple jump	17.83 m
2004	Olympic Games	Athens, Greece	1st	Triple jump	17.79 m
2006	European Championships	Gothenburg, Sweden	1st	Triple jump	17.67 m
2010	World Indoor Championships	Doha, Qatar	4th	Triple jump	17.23 m
2011	European Indoor Championships	Paris, France	5th	Triple jump	17.20 m
2011	World Championships	Daegu, South Korea	6th	Triple jump	17.23 m

== Other victories ==
=== Triple jump ===
- 2001: Helsinki (Grand Prix) - 17.08 m; Vaasa (European Cup first league) - 17.00 m; Rethymno (athletics meet) - 17.49 m
- 2002: Athens (Grand Prix) - 17.40 m; Seville (European Cup first league) - 17.63 m; Monaco (IAAF Golden League) - 17.63 m; Berlin (Golden League) - 17.40 m; Paris (Grand Prix Final) - 17.48 m
- 2003: Lappeenranta (European Cup first league) - 17.38 m; Rethymno (athletics meet) - 17.55 m; Gateshead (Grand Prix) - 17.92(w) m; Stockholm (Grand Prix) - 17.36 m; Monaco (World Athletics Final) - 17.55 m
- 2004: Turin (Grand Prix) - 17.61 m; Bergen (Golden League) - 17.58 m; Bydgoszcz (European Cup super league) - 17.30 m; Gateshead (Grand Prix) - 17.43 m; Rome (Golden League) - 17.50 m; Paris Saint-Denis (Golden League) - 17.41 m; Zürich (Golden League) - 17.46 m; Brussels (Golden League) - 17.44 m; Berlin (Golden League) - 17.45 m; Monaco (World Athletics Final) - 17.66 m
- 2006: Prague (European Cup super league) - 17.40 m; Lausanne (Grand Prix) - 17.62 m; London (Grand Prix) - 17.42 m; Zürich (Golden League-meet) - 17.39 m
- 2007: Vaasa (European Cup first league) - 17.33 m; Paris Saint-Denis (Golden League) - 17.56 m; Rome (Golden League) - 17.19 m

== International awards ==
- Waterford Crystal European Athlete of the Year Trophy 2004
- Waterford Crystal European Athlete of the Year Trophy 2003

== Personal bests ==
- Triple jump
  - Indoor - 17.83 metres
  - Outdoor - 17.79 metres
- High jump - 2.28 metres
- Long jump - 7.71 metres

Records
Preceded by (Russia) Leonid Voloshin	Men's Triple Jump Indoor European Record Holder; 5 March 2002 – 14 March 2010	Succeeded by (France) Teddy Tamgho
Awards
Preceded by (United Kingdom) Dwain Chambers	Men's European Athlete of the Year; 2003, 2004	Succeeded by (Lithuania) Virgilijus Alekna
Olympic Games
Preceded by Lars Frölander	Flagbearer for Sweden; Beijing 2008	Succeeded by Rolf-Göran Bengtsson
