= Péter Tölgyesi =

Hungarian triple jumper

Péter Tölgyesi (born 9 June 1981) is a Hungarian triple jumper.

He finished seventh at the 2005 European Indoor Championships. He also competed at the 2004 World Indoor Championships and the 2004 Olympic Games without reaching the final.

His personal best jump is 16.74 metres, achieved in June 2003 in Lappeenranta.
