= 2004 IAAF World Athletics Final =

International track and field competition

The 2nd IAAF World Athletics Final was held at the Stade Louis II, in Fontvieille, Monaco on September 18, and September 19, 2004.

The hammer throw event for men and women had to take place in Szombathely, Hungary a week previous as the Monaco stadium was not large enough to hold the event.

One of the main highlights was the men's 3000 metres steeplechase. This was won by Saif Saeed Shaheen of Qatar, (formerly Stephen Cherono of Kenya), who won in a championship record of 7:56.94 despite the fact that the field had been held up by Wesley Kiprotich clattering into the first barrier. Shaheen had been unable to compete in the recent 2004 Summer Olympics due to his change of nationality but had set the world record of 7:53.63 minutes in Brussels just ten days after the Olympic final.

Another highlight was the pole vault competition where Timothy Mack cleared 6.01 m to join the exclusive 6 metres club.

== Medal summary ==
=== Men ===
Games	Gold	Silver	Bronze
100 m	Asafa Powell (JAM)	Francis Obikwelu (POR)	Aziz Zakari (GHA)
200 m	Asafa Powell (JAM)	Frankie Fredericks (NAM)	Stéphan Buckland (MRI)
400 m	Michael Blackwood (JAM)	Derrick Brew (USA)	Otis Harris (USA)
800 m	Yusuf Saad Kamel (BHR)	Joseph Mutua (KEN)	Bram Som (NED)
1500 m	Ivan Heshko (UKR)	Alex Kipchirchir (KEN)	Laban Rotich (KEN)
3000 m	Eliud Kipchoge (KEN)	James Kwalia (KEN)	Mulugeta Wendimu (ETH)
5000 m	Sileshi Sihine (ETH)	Dejene Berhanu (ETH)	Augustine Kiprono Choge (KEN)
110 m hurdles	Allen Johnson (USA)	Maurice Wignall (JAM)	Staņislavs Olijars (LAT)
400 m hurdles	Bershawn Jackson (USA)	James Carter (USA)	Kemel Thompson (JAM)
3000 m s'chase	Saif Saaeed Shaheen (QAT)	Ezekiel Kemboi (KEN)	Paul Kipsiele Koech (KEN)
Long jump	Ignisious Gaisah (GHA)	Dwight Phillips (USA)	John Moffitt (USA)
Triple jump	Christian Olsson (SWE)	Danil Burkenya (RUS)	Kenta Bell (USA)
High jump	Stefan Holm (SWE)	Yaroslav Rybakov (RUS)	Mark Boswell (CAN)
Pole vault	Timothy Mack (USA)	Toby Stevenson (USA)	Derek Miles (USA)
Shot put	Joachim Olsen (DEN)	Adam Nelson (USA)	Manuel Martínez Gutiérrez (ESP)
Discus throw	Mario Pestano (ESP)	Zoltán Kővágó (HUN)	Aleksander Tammert (EST)
Javelin throw	Breaux Greer (USA)	Andreas Thorkildsen (NOR)	Jan Železný (CZE)
Hammer throw	Olli-Pekka Karjalainen (FIN)	Krisztián Pars (HUN)	Primož Kozmus (SLO) Slovenia

=== Women ===
Games	Gold	Silver	Bronze
100 m	Veronica Campbell (JAM)	Aleen Bailey (JAM)	Lauryn Williams (USA)
200 m	Veronica Campbell (JAM)	Debbie Ferguson (BAH)	Aleen Bailey (JAM)
400 m	Ana Guevara (MEX)	Monique Hennagan (USA)	DeeDee Trotter (USA)
800 m	Hasna Benhassi (MAR)	Jearl Miles Clark (USA)	Amina Aït Hammou (MAR)
1500 m	Kelly Holmes (GBR)	Tatyana Tomashova (RUS)	Yelena Zadorozhnaya (RUS)
3000 m	Meseret Defar (ETH)	Yelena Zadorozhnaya (RUS)	Lidia Chojecka (POL)
5000 m	Elvan Abeylegesse (TUR)	Isabella Ochichi (KEN)	Ejegayehu Dibaba (ETH)
100 m hurdles	Joanna Hayes (USA)	Jenny Adams (USA)	Lacena Golding-Clarke (JAM)
400 m hurdles	Sandra Glover (USA)	Tatyana Tereshchuk (UKR)	Brenda Taylor (USA)
Long jump	Irina Simagina (RUS)	Tatyana Lebedeva (RUS)	Tatyana Kotova (RUS)
Triple jump	Françoise Mbango Etone (CMR)	Tatyana Lebedeva (RUS)	Yamilé Aldama (SUD)
High jump	Yelena Slesarenko (RUS)	Vita Styopina (UKR)	Iryna Mykhalchenko (UKR)
Pole vault	Yelena Isinbayeva (RUS)	Tatyana Polnova (RUS)	Anna Rogowska (POL)
Shot put	Nadzeya Ostapchuk (BLR)	Krystyna Zabawska (POL)	Lieja Tunks (NED)
Discus throw	Věra Pospíšilová-Cechlová (CZE)	Natalya Sadova (RUS)	Aretha Thurmond (USA)
Javelin throw	Osleidys Menéndez (CUB)	Nikola Brejchová (CZE)	Steffi Nerius (GER)
Hammer throw	Olga Kuzenkova (RUS)	Volha Tsander (BLR)	Manuela Montebrun (FRA)

== Medal table ==
Rank	Nation	Gold	Silver	Bronze	Total
1	United States (USA)	6	8	8	22
2	Jamaica (JAM)	5	2	3	10
3	Russia (RUS)	4	8	2	14
4	Ethiopia (ETH)	2	1	2	5
5	Sweden (SWE)	2	0	0	2
6	Kenya (KEN)	1	5	3	9
7	Ukraine (UKR)	1	2	1	4
8	Czech Republic (CZE)	1	1	1	3
9	Belarus (BLR)	1	1	0	2
10	Ghana (GHA)	1	0	1	2
10	Spain (ESP)	1	0	1	2
Totals (11 entries)		25	28	22	75
