= Timothy Rusan =

American triple jumper

Timothy Rusan (born 25 June 1977) is an American triple jumper.

He finished fifth at the 2003 IAAF World Indoor Championships. He also competed at the 2004 Olympics, but failed to qualify from his pool.

His personal best jump is 17.37 meters, achieved in July 2004 in Sacramento. He has a better indoor personal best with 17.45 meters.

In 2004 he tested positive for tetrahydrocannabinol.

== See also ==
- List of sportspeople sanctioned for doping offences
