= Jadel Gregório =

Brazilian athlete (born 1980)

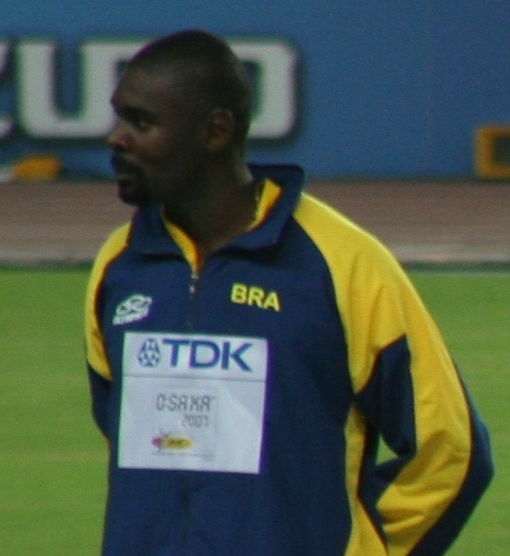
- Jadel Gregório in 2007

Personal information
- Born: 16 September 1980 (age 45) Jandaia do Sul, Paraná, Brazil

Sport
- Sport: Track and field
Medal record
Representing Brazil
World Championships
Silver medal – second place	2007 Osaka	Triple jump
World Indoor Championships
Silver medal – second place	2004 Budapest	Triple jump
Silver medal – second place	2006 Moscow	Triple jump
World Athletics Final
Silver medal – second place	2005 Monte Carlo	Triple jump
Silver medal – second place	2008 Stuttgart	Triple jump
Pan American Games
Gold medal – first place	2007 Rio de Janeiro	Triple jump
Silver medal – second place	2003 Santo Domingo	Triple jump
Summer Universiade
Bronze medal – third place	2001 Beijing	Triple jump

Jadel Abdul Ghani Gregório (born 16 September 1980) is a Brazilian athlete competing in long jump and triple jump. Based in São Paulo, he has competed in several international championships since 2001. His jump of 17.90m is the South American and Brazilian record and ranks him tied for eighth best ever.

He was a competitor for Brazil in the 2008 Summer Olympics. The Chinese hosts constructed an extension to his bed to accommodate his 2.03 meter (6 ft 8 in) frame.

After marrying Samara Abdul Ghani, his Lebanese physiotherapist, in 2005 Gregório converted to Islam and changed his legal name to Jadel Abdul Ghani Gregório. Samara has since given birth to their first child, Jade, and to their second child, Sahara.

In Brazil Grand Prix of athletics, organized in Belém, of May 28, 2007, Jadel Gregório broke the record South-American and Brazilian of triple jump, obtaining a mark of 17.90 meters. This Jump, at the time, moved him up to the 6th place on the world all-time list, behind only Jonathan Edwards (18.29m), Kenny Harrison (18.09m), Willie Banks (17.97m), Khristo Markov (17.92m) and James Beckford (17.92m).

== Personal bests ==
Outdoor

- Long jump - 8.22 m (2004)
- Triple jump - 17.90 m (2007)

Indoor

- Long jump - 7.82 m (2005)
- Triple jump - 17.56 m (2006)

== Competition record ==
Year	Competition	Venue	Position	Event	Notes
Representing Brazil
1999	Pan American Junior Championships	Tampa, United States	3rd	Triple jump	15.90 m
1999	South American Junior Championships	Concepción, Chile	1st	Long jump	7.36 m
1999	South American Junior Championships	Concepción, Chile	1st	Triple jump	16.18 m
2001	South American Championships	Manaus, Brazil	5th	Long jump	7.22 m
2001	South American Championships	Manaus, Brazil	1st	Triple jump	16.98 m
2001	Universiade	Beijing, China	3rd	Triple jump	16.92 m
2002	Ibero-American Championships	Guatemala City, Guatemala	1st	Triple jump	16.90 m
2003	World Indoor Championships	Birmingham, United Kingdom	6th	Triple jump	16.86 m
2003	South American Championships	Barquisimeto, Venezuela	1st	Triple jump	16.76 m
2003	Pan American Games	Santo Domingo, Dom. Rep.	2nd	Triple jump	17.03 m
2004	World Indoor Championships	Budapest, Hungary	2nd	Triple jump	17.43 m
2004	Olympic Games	Athens, Greece	32nd (q)	Long jump	7.50 m
2004	Olympic Games	Athens, Greece	5th	Triple jump	17.31 m
2005	World Championships	Helsinki, Finland	6th	Triple jump	17.20 m
2006	World Indoor Championships	Moscow, Russia	2nd	Triple jump	17.56 m
2007	Pan American Games	Rio de Janeiro, Brazil	1st	Triple jump	17.27 m
2007	World Championships	Osaka, Japan	2nd	Triple jump	17.59 m
2008	Olympic Games	Beijing, China	6th	Triple jump	17.20 m
2009	World Championships	Berlin, Germany	8th	Triple jump	16.89 m
2010	World Indoor Championships	Doha, Qatar	6th	Triple jump	16.78 m
2010	Ibero-American Championships	San Fernando, Spain	3rd	Triple jump	16.82 m
