= Boštjan Šimunič =

Slovenian triple jumper

Boštjan Šimunic (born 28 December 1974) is a retired Slovenian triple jumper.

He finished seventh at the 2001 Summer Universiade and fourth at the 2001 Mediterranean Games. He also competed at the 2002 European Championships and the 2004 Olympic Games without reaching the final.

His personal best jump is 16.82 metres, achieved in June 2002 in Ljubljana.
