= Viktor Gushchinskiy =

Russian triple jumper (born 1978)

Viktor Gushchinskiy (born 12 August 1978) is a Russian triple jumper.

He finished sixth at the 2001 Summer Universiade and seventh at the 2004 Olympic Games. He later competed at the 2005 World Championships and the 2006 World Indoor Championships without reaching the final.

His personal best jump is 17.22 metres, achieved in July 2004 in Tula. He has 17.33 metres on the indoor track, achieved in February 2006 in Samara.
