= Allen Simms =

American triple jumper (born 1982)

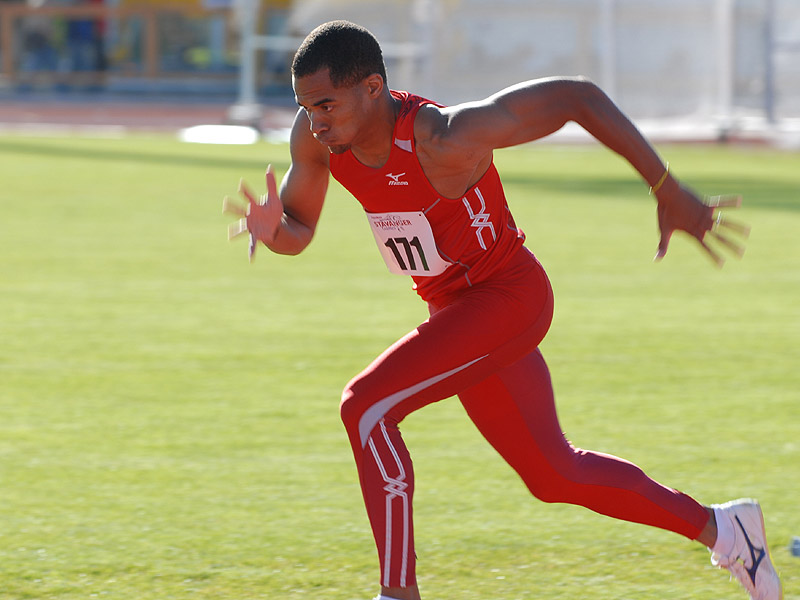
- Simms in Stavanger 2007

Personal information
- Born: 26 July 1982 (age 43) Washington DC, United States
- Education: University of Southern California

Sport
- Sport: Track and field
Medal record
Men's athletics
Representing the United States
NACAC Championships
Silver medal – second place	2007 San Salvador	triple jump
CAC Championships
Silver medal – second place	2005 Nassau	triple jump

Allen Simms (born July 26, 1982) is an American triple jumper and Social Entrepreneur.

Simms is the founder of Impano Academy Rwanda, a non-profit amateur sports organization established in 2016 based in Kigali, Rwanda designed to promote the sport of track and field by offering professional sports coaching, guidance, and education to Rwandan potential athletes in underdeveloped communities. The organization travels around the country carefully testing prospective student-athletes in collaboration with local clubs, teams, and the national federation. They train local coaches to identify talent, select the best sporting youth, and develop them into future champions. They offer sports camps and clinics for all athletes to learn from the best coaches and encourage participation in sports.

At the 2008 Olympic Trials in Eugene, Oregon, Simms finished in sixth place overall, just four inches short of making the USA Olympic team. He finished the season ranked fifth nationally. In 2010 he finished 3rd at the USA Indoor Championships in the triple jump.

== Biography ==
He competed for Puerto Rico in 2007 after changing allegiance from the United States in May 2005, but changed back in 2008. In 2007, he was national champion in the triple jump and ranked 15th in the world. That year, with a best jump of 56 ft. 2 inches, he qualified for the World Championships and the Olympics with an "A" standard. Simms met the "A" standard in 2004 also, and he participated in the 2003 and 2005 World Outdoor Championships and the 2004 and 2006 World Indoor Championships. In 2004, he was the USA Indoor Champion in the triple jump. He finished fourth at the 2003 Pan American Games and eighth in long jump at the 2007 Pan American Games.

As a collegian, he was the NCAA runner-up at the Outdoor championships in 2005 in the triple jump and the individual champion at the NCAA Indoor Championships in 2003. Over the course of his collegiate career, he was a seven-time All-American in the long and triple jumps, and in 2003 he was the PAC-10 record holder in the triple jump, PAC-10 Newcomer of the Year, the NCAA West Region Field Event Athlete of the Year and set the University of Southern California's school record in the triple jump. Simms had earlier competed for the George Mason Patriots track and field team.

His personal best jump is 17.17 metres, achieved in April 2003 in Los Angeles. He has 17.26 metres on the indoor track, achieved in March 2003 in Fayetteville. In the long jump he has 8.02 metres.

He graduated from USC in 2005 with a bachelor's degree in multimedia technology and earned a Master of Art in liberal studies and a graduate certificate in global studies from the University of North Carolina-Greensboro in 2014.

== Coaching ==
Allen Simms served 2 seasons as assistant track and field coach specializing in the jumps/multi events at Cornell University. His first year at Cornell saw remarkable success from both the men's and women's jumpers. Simms' group helped the men win the 2016 Outdoor Heptagonal title in record-setting fashion, and the women played an integral part in winning the outdoor ECAC title in 2016. Triple jumper Bobby Plummer headlined the Heps-clinching group, winning the indoor IC4A title to go along with the outdoor Heps crown (15.99m) en route to advancing to the NCAA Championships, where he earned honorable mention All-American honors. Alex Rodriguez in the lC4A long jump (7.57m) and Myles Lazarou in the Heps high jump (2.14m) were also title winners. Kate Gulbrandsen led the women, earning All-Ivy and All-East honors in the high jump (1.79m). In all, Simms coached two Heps champions, two IC4A champions and had four athletes reach the NCAA First Round in just his first year at Cornell. Before Cornell Simms served as the Director of Operations and Assistant track coach at California State University-Los Angeles from Sept 2013. At Cal State L.A., he coached three jumpers to Division II national championships and All-West Region honors. Seven of his athletes were named to All-California Collegiate Athletic Association teams.

At University of Idaho, where he was an assistant coach working with the Vandal jumps program in 2013. He coached one All-American in the pole vault at the 2013 NCAA Division 1 championships in Eugene with a leap of 5.50m (18'1)- in his one year at Idaho, two student-athletes were NCAA regional qualifiers in the Pole Vault. His student-athletes also won a Western Athletic Conference championship, earned six All-WAC awards and set two school records. Simms has previous collegiate coaching stops at Davidson College from 2008 to 2011, where he worked with sprinters, hurdlers and jumpers, and at Utica College in 2011, where he coached the school's jumpers to five school records, two conference titles and two Eastern College Athletic Conference bids.

Simms is an International Association of Athletics Federations Level 4 Jumps coach and holds a USA Track & Field Level I coaching certificate.
