= 1998 World Junior Championships in Athletics – Men's 4 × 100 metres relay =

The men's 4×100 metres relay event at the 1998 World Junior Championships in Athletics was held in Annecy, France, at Parc des Sports on 2 August.

== Medalists ==
Gold	Steve Slowly; Dwight Thomas; Paul Thompson; Roy Bailey; Jamaica
Silver	Casey Combest; Dashaun McCullough; Amar Johnson; Russell Frye; United States
Bronze	Tobias Unger; Stefan Holz; Jirka Zapletal; Kevin Kuske; Germany

== Results ==
=== Final ===
2 August

Rank	Nation	Competitors	Time	Notes
1st place, gold medalist(s)	Jamaica	Steve Slowly; Dwight Thomas; Paul Thompson; Roy Bailey	39.70	
2nd place, silver medalist(s)	United States	Casey Combest; Dashaun McCullough; Amar Johnson; Russell Frye	39.71	
3rd place, bronze medalist(s)	Germany	Tobias Unger; Stefan Holz; Jirka Zapletal; Kevin Kuske	39.99	
4	Spain	Alejandro Ferrer; Alejandro Olivan; Pablo Rodríguez; Ángel Rodríguez	40.48	
5	Australia	Stephen Hadfield; Adam Dorey; Nathan Carr; Troy Davies	40.64	
6	France	Anthony Begue; Jeremy Bobe; Cédric Gold Dalg; Dimitri Demonière	40.65	
7	South Africa	Colin Dreyer; Lawrence Nkosi; Wynand Dempers; Bradley Agnew	40.79	
	Italy	Alessandro Battinelli; Massimiliano Donati; Marco Cuneo; Davide Dell'Oro	DNF	

=== Heats ===
2 August

==== Heat 1 ====
Rank	Nation	Competitors	Time	Notes
1	Jamaica	Steve Slowly; Dwight Thomas; Paul Thompson; Roy Bailey	39.80	Q
2	Germany	Tobias Unger; Stefan Holz; Jirka Zapletal; Kevin Kuske	40.01	Q
3	France	Anthony Begue; Yannick Urbino; Cédric Gold Dalg; Dimitri Demonière	40.14	Q
4	Italy	Alessandro Battinelli; Massimiliano Donati; Marco Cuneo; Davide Dell'Oro	40.32	q
5	South Africa	Colin Dreyer; Lawrence Nkosi; Wynand Dempers; Bradley Agnew	40.89	q
6	Greece	Mihaíl Xanthakis; Konstadínos Sfiropoulos; Aristídis Petrídis; Athanásios Tsiouris	41.07	
7	Slovenia	Uros Zver; Matic Osovnikar; Boštjan Fridrih; Matic Šušteršic	41.18	

==== Heat 2 ====
Rank	Nation	Competitors	Time	Notes
1	United States	Casey Combest; Dashaun McCullough; Amar Johnson; Russell Frye	40.09	Q
2	Spain	Alejandro Ferrer; Alejandro Olivan; Pablo Rodríguez; Ángel Rodríguez	40.51	Q
3	Australia	Stephen Hadfield; Adam Dorey; Nathan Carr; Troy Davies	40.77	Q
	United Kingdom	Mark Lewis-Francis; Christian Malcolm; Chris Lambert; Tim Benjamin	DQ	IAAF rule 170.14
	Japan	Takashi Miyata; Hirofumi Nakagawa; Jun-ya Omodaka; Shigeyuki Kojima	DNF	
	New Zealand	Dallas Roberts; Russell Wise; Benjamin Potter; Matthew Cunningham	DNF	

== Participation ==
According to an unofficial count, 53 athletes from 13 countries participated in the event.

- Australia (4)
- France (5)
- Germany (4)
- Greece (4)
- Italy (4)
- Jamaica (4)
- Japan (4)
- New Zealand (4)
- Slovenia (4)
- South Africa (4)
- Spain (4)
- United Kingdom (4)
- United States (4)
