= 1998 World Junior Championships in Athletics – Men's 100 metres =

The men's 100 metres event at the 1998 World Junior Championships in Athletics was held in Annecy, France, at Parc des Sports on 28 and 29 July.

== Medalists ==
Gold	Christian Malcolm; United Kingdom
Silver	Amar Johnson; United States
Bronze	Dwight Thomas; Jamaica

== Results ==
=== Final ===
29 July
Wind: +1.6 m/s

Rank	Name	Nationality	Time	Notes
1st place, gold medalist(s)	Christian Malcolm	United Kingdom	10.12	
2nd place, silver medalist(s)	Amar Johnson	United States	10.34	
3rd place, bronze medalist(s)	Dwight Thomas	Jamaica	10.40	
4	Dimitri Demonière	France	10.43	
5	Athanásios Tsiouris	Greece	10.47	
6	Jairo Duzant	Netherlands Antilles	10.49	
7	Cédric Gold Dalg	France	10.53	
8	Shigeyuki Kojima	Japan	10.76	

=== Semifinals ===
29 July

==== Semifinal 1 ====
Wind: +0.5 m/s

Rank	Name	Nationality	Time	Notes
1	Amar Johnson	United States	10.42	Q
2	Dwight Thomas	Jamaica	10.45	Q
3	Shigeyuki Kojima	Japan	10.57	Q
4	Cédric Gold Dalg	France	10.61	Q
5	Anson Henry	Canada	10.62	
6	Juan Pita	Cuba	10.65	
7	Benjamin Potter	New Zealand	10.68	
8	Yordan Yovchev	Bulgaria	10.72	

==== Semifinal 2 ====
Wind: -1.2 m/s

Rank	Name	Nationality	Time	Notes
1	Christian Malcolm	United Kingdom	10.18	Q
2	Dimitri Demonière	France	10.42	Q
3	Jairo Duzant	Netherlands Antilles	10.49	Q
4	Athanásios Tsiouris	Greece	10.52	Q
5	Bradley Agnew	South Africa	10.56	
6	Attila Farkas	Hungary	10.62	
7	Raphael de Oliveira	Brazil	10.71	
8	Kevin Kuske	Germany	10.78	

=== Quarterfinals ===
28 July

==== Quarterfinal 1 ====
Wind: -1.2 m/s

Rank	Name	Nationality	Time	Notes
1	Bradley Agnew	South Africa	10.69	Q
2	Kevin Kuske	Germany	10.72	Q
3	Athanásios Tsiouris	Greece	10.72	Q
4	Yordan Yovchev	Bulgaria	10.74	Q
5	Jun-ya Omodaka	Japan	10.75	
6	Slaven Krajačić	Croatia	10.80	
7	William To Wai Lok	Hong Kong	10.86	
8	Nathan Carr	Australia	11.02	

==== Quarterfinal 2 ====
Wind: +0.2 m/s

Rank	Name	Nationality	Time	Notes
1	Christian Malcolm	United Kingdom	10.31	Q
2	Juan Pita	Cuba	10.58	Q
3	Dwight Thomas	Jamaica	10.60	Q
4	Cédric Gold Dalg	France	10.70	Q
5	Troy Davies	Australia	10.72	
6	Matic Šušteršic	Slovenia	10.73	
7	Roger Smith	Cayman Islands	10.84	
8	Yu Li-Chun	Chinese Taipei	10.95	

==== Quarterfinal 3 ====
Wind: -0.7 m/s

Rank	Name	Nationality	Time	Notes
1	Benjamin Potter	New Zealand	10.64	Q
2	Anson Henry	Canada	10.67	Q
3	Shigeyuki Kojima	Japan	10.69	Q
4	Raphael de Oliveira	Brazil	10.78	Q
5	Dashaun McCullough	United States	10.78	
6	Lawrence Nkosi	South Africa	10.86	
7	Ángel Rodríguez	Spain	10.91	
	Piotr Berestiuk	Poland	DNS	

==== Quarterfinal 4 ====
Wind: -0.5 m/s

Rank	Name	Nationality	Time	Notes
1	Amar Johnson	United States	10.41	Q
2	Dimitri Demonière	France	10.49	Q
3	Attila Farkas	Hungary	10.56	Q
4	Jairo Duzant	Netherlands Antilles	10.59	Q
5	Tobias Unger	Germany	10.63	
6	Jarbas Mascarenhas	Brazil	10.70	
7	Matthew Cunningham	New Zealand	10.84	
8	Sherwin Vries	Namibia	10.93	

=== Heats ===
28 July

==== Heat 1 ====
Wind: -0.4 m/s

Rank	Name	Nationality	Time	Notes
1	Dashaun McCullough	United States	10.56	Q
2	Bradley Agnew	South Africa	10.61	Q
3	Jun-ya Omodaka	Japan	10.61	Q
4	Raphael de Oliveira	Brazil	10.75	q
5	Jan Kritzbach	Czech Republic	10.85	
6	Konstadínos Sfiropoulos	Greece	11.01	
7	Myo Myint Oo	Myanmar	11.41	

==== Heat 2 ====
Wind: +0.4 m/s

Rank	Name	Nationality	Time	Notes
1	Christian Malcolm	United Kingdom	10.39	Q
2	Anson Henry	Canada	10.62	Q
3	Lawrence Nkosi	South Africa	10.70	Q
4	William To Wai Lok	Hong Kong	10.73	q
5	Pablo Rodríguez	Spain	10.93	
6	Georges Ayangmaa	Cameroon	10.95	
7	Dermot Rawlins	Saint Kitts and Nevis	11.24	

==== Heat 3 ====
Wind: -0.2 m/s

Rank	Name	Nationality	Time	Notes
1	Kevin Kuske	Germany	10.65	Q
2	Athanásios Tsiouris	Greece	10.69	Q
3	Sherwin Vries	Namibia	10.73	Q
4	Matthew Cunningham	New Zealand	10.74	q
5	Roger Smith	Cayman Islands	10.82	q
6	Robert Mugagga	Uganda	11.13	
7	Nguyen Phuc Man	Vietnam	11.85	

==== Heat 4 ====
Wind: -0.8 m/s

Rank	Name	Nationality	Time	Notes
1	Dwight Thomas	Jamaica	10.74	Q
2	Cédric Gold Dalg	France	10.76	Q
3	Piotr Berestiuk	Poland	10.76	Q
4	Rudy Colabella	Belgium	10.86	
5	Saula Roko	Fiji	11.02	
6	Thomas Scheidl	Austria	11.06	
7	Souleymane Meité	Côte d'Ivoire	11.12	

==== Heat 5 ====
Wind: +1.0 m/s

Rank	Name	Nationality	Time	Notes
1	Jarbas Mascarenhas	Brazil	10.64	Q
2	Shigeyuki Kojima	Japan	10.67	Q
3	Yordan Yovchev	Bulgaria	10.77	Q
4	Nathan Carr	Australia	10.83	q
5	Ousman Jatta	Gambia	11.10	
6	Sean Lambert	Grenada	11.18	
7	Philam Garcia	Guam	11.68	
8	Nuno Ribeiro	Cape Verde	11.88	

==== Heat 6 ====
Wind: -0.3 m/s

Rank	Name	Nationality	Time	Notes
1	Slaven Krajačić	Croatia	10.47	Q
2	Juan Pita	Cuba	10.51	Q
3	Matic Šušteršic	Slovenia	10.60	Q
4	Troy Davies	Australia	10.61	q
5	Ángel Rodríguez	Spain	10.79	q
6	Souhalia Alamou	Benin	10.98	
	Samuel Joseph	Haiti	DQ	IAAF rule 162.7

==== Heat 7 ====
Wind: -0.7 m/s

Rank	Name	Nationality	Time	Notes
1	Benjamin Potter	New Zealand	10.64	Q
2	Dimitri Demonière	France	10.65	Q
3	Yu Li-Chun	Chinese Taipei	10.83	Q
4	Nelson Lucas	Seychelles	10.94	
5	Kristijan Kralj	Slovenia	10.98	
6	José Meneses	Guatemala	11.13	
7	Tariq Hewey	Bermuda	11.24	

==== Heat 8 ====
Wind: -0.5 m/s

Rank	Name	Nationality	Time	Notes
1	Amar Johnson	United States	10.62	Q
2	Jairo Duzant	Netherlands Antilles	10.66	Q
3	Tobias Unger	Germany	10.72	Q
4	Attila Farkas	Hungary	10.76	q
5	Akran Bensmira	Algeria	10.94	
6	Helly Ollarves	Venezuela	10.95	
	Joseph Colville	Costa Rica	DNF	

== Participation ==
According to an unofficial count, 57 athletes from 46 countries participated in the event.

- Algeria (1)
- Australia (2)
- Austria (1)
- Belgium (1)
- Benin (1)
- Bermuda (1)
- Brazil (2)
- Bulgaria (1)
- Cameroon (1)
- Canada (1)
- Cape Verde (1)
- Cayman Islands (1)
- Chinese Taipei (1)
- Costa Rica (1)
- Côte d'Ivoire (1)
- Croatia (1)
- Cuba (1)
- Czech Republic (1)
- Fiji (1)
- France (2)
- Gambia (1)
- Germany (2)
- Greece (2)
- Grenada (1)
- Guam (1)
- Guatemala (1)
- Haiti (1)
- Hong Kong (1)
- Hungary (1)
- Jamaica (1)
- Japan (2)
- Myanmar (1)
- Namibia (1)
- Netherlands Antilles (1)
- New Zealand (2)
- Poland (1)
- Saint Kitts and Nevis (1)
- Seychelles (1)
- Slovenia (2)
- South Africa (2)
- Spain (2)
- Uganda (1)
- United Kingdom (1)
- United States (2)
- Venezuela (1)
- Vietnam (1)
