= 1998 World Junior Championships in Athletics – Women's 3000 metres =

The women's 3000 metres event at the 1998 World Junior Championships in Athletics was held in Annecy, France, at Parc des Sports on 28 and 30 July.

== Medalists ==
Gold	Yin Lili; China
Silver	Yimenashu Taye; Ethiopia
Bronze	Edna Kiplagat; Kenya

== Results ==
=== Final ===
30 July

Rank	Name	Nationality	Time	Notes
1st place, gold medalist(s)	Yin Lili	China	8:57.09	
2nd place, silver medalist(s)	Yimenashu Taye	Ethiopia	9:01.70	
3rd place, bronze medalist(s)	Edna Kiplagat	Kenya	9:05.46	
4	Lan Lixin	China	9:07.39	
5	Yoshiko Fujinaga	Japan	9:15.64	
6	Margaret Chepkemboi	Kenya	9:25.38	
7	Inês Monteiro	Portugal	9:26.33	
8	Melanie Schulz	Germany	9:28.71	
9	Genet Teka	Ethiopia	9:33.17	
10	Živilė Balčiūnaitė	Lithuania	9:34.01	
11	Eloise Poppet	Australia	9:36.64	
12	Seltana Aït Hammou	Morocco	10:15.26	

=== Heats ===
28 July

==== Heat 1 ====
Rank	Name	Nationality	Time	Notes
1	Lan Lixin	China	9:22.19	Q
2	Margaret Chepkemboi	Kenya	9:22.49	Q
3	Yoshiko Fujinaga	Japan	9:22.93	Q
4	Eloise Poppet	Australia	9:23.67	Q
5	Živilė Balčiūnaitė	Lithuania	9:24.98	q
6	Seltana Aït Hammou	Morocco	9:24.99	q
7	Amber Gascoigne	United Kingdom	9:43.55	
8	Demelza Murrihy	New Zealand	9:52.24	
9	Catherine Maapela	South Africa	10:06.14	

==== Heat 2 ====
Rank	Name	Nationality	Time	Notes
1	Yin Lili	China	9:17.83	Q
2	Yimenashu Taye	Ethiopia	9:18.80	Q
3	Edna Kiplagat	Kenya	9:23.87	Q
4	Inês Monteiro	Portugal	9:24.78	Q
5	Genet Teka	Ethiopia	9:26.50	q
6	Melanie Schulz	Germany	9:28.98	q
7	Diana Maciusonytė	Lithuania	9:33.08	
8	Yelena Tolstygina	Belarus	9:35.17	
9	Nicole Chapple	Australia	9:40.62	
10	Vanessa Veiga Comesaña	Spain	9:58.46	
11	Épiphanie Nyirabaramé	Rwanda	10:39.35	

== Participation ==
According to an unofficial count, 20 athletes from 15 countries participated in the event.

- Australia (2)
- Belarus (1)
- China (2)
- Ethiopia (2)
- Germany (1)
- Japan (1)
- Kenya (2)
- Lithuania (2)
- Morocco (1)
- New Zealand (1)
- Portugal (1)
- Rwanda (1)
- South Africa (1)
- Spain (1)
- United Kingdom (1)
