= 1998 World Junior Championships in Athletics – Women's 1500 metres =

The women's 1500 metres event at the 1998 World Junior Championships in Athletics was held in Annecy, France, at Parc des Sports on 31 July and 2 August.

== Medalists ==
Gold	Lan Lixin; China
Silver	Yimenashu Taye; Ethiopia
Bronze	Bouchra Benthami; Morocco

== Results ==
=== Final ===
2 August

Rank	Name	Nationality	Time	Notes
1st place, gold medalist(s)	Lan Lixin	China	4:10.05	
2nd place, silver medalist(s)	Yimenashu Taye	Ethiopia	4:11.97	
3rd place, bronze medalist(s)	Bouchra Benthami	Morocco	4:12.76	
4	Rose Kosgei	Kenya	4:13.14	
5	Song Liqing	China	4:13.76	
6	Natalia Rodríguez	Spain	4:16.20	
7	Benita Willis	Australia	4:16.75	
8	Iona Oltean	Romania	4:16.79	
9	Malgorzata Bury	Poland	4:17.14	
10	Georgie Clarke	Australia	4:20.44	
11	Hisae Yoshimatsu	Japan	4:20.84	
12	Sonja Stolić	Yugoslavia	4:21.43	

=== Heats ===
31 July

==== Heat 1 ====
Rank	Name	Nationality	Time	Notes
1	Bouchra Benthami	Morocco	4:15.74	Q
2	Song Liqing	China	4:15.88	Q
3	Rose Kosgei	Kenya	4:16.10	Q
4	Natalia Rodríguez	Spain	4:16.23	Q
5	Yimenashu Taye	Ethiopia	4:16.59	q
6	Malgorzata Bury	Poland	4:17.22	q
7	Benita Willis	Australia	4:18.25	q
8	Sonja Stolić	Yugoslavia	4:21.19	q
9	Alesya Turova	Belarus	4:21.72	
10	Kattell Villain	France	4:25.67	
11	Ryoko Takezawa	Japan	4:26.80	
12	Diala El-Chabi	Lebanon	4:52.53	

==== Heat 2 ====
Rank	Name	Nationality	Time	Notes
1	Georgie Clarke	Australia	4:20.50	Q
2	Lan Lixin	China	4:20.53	Q
3	Iona Oltean	Romania	4:20.58	Q
4	Hisae Yoshimatsu	Japan	4:20.99	Q
5	René Kalmer	South Africa	4:22.75	
6	Melanie Schulz	Germany	4:23.05	
7	Sonja Roman	Slovenia	4:27.11	
8	Ljiljana Culibrk	Croatia	4:30.18	
9	Tinneke Boonen	Belgium	4:34.00	
10	Genet Teka	Ethiopia	4:36.17	
11	Zalia Aliou	Togo	4:36.64	
12	Daniela Kuleska	North Macedonia	4:44.56	

== Participation ==
According to an unofficial count, 24 athletes from 20 countries participated in the event.

- Australia (2)
- Belarus (1)
- Belgium (1)
- China (2)
- Croatia (1)
- Ethiopia (2)
- France (1)
- Germany (1)
- Japan (2)
- Kenya (1)
- Lebanon (1)
- North Macedonia (1)
- Morocco (1)
- Poland (1)
- Romania (1)
- Slovenia (1)
- South Africa (1)
- Spain (1)
- Togo (1)
- Yugoslavia (1)
