= Combest =

Combest is a surname. Notable people with the surname include:

- Casey Combest (born 1980), American track and field sprinter
- Jimmy Combest (1926–2013), American jockey and trainer in Thoroughbred racing
- Larry Combest (born 1945), American politician
