= Lan Lixin =

Chinese middle-distance runner

Lan Lixin (Chinese: 兰丽新; born 14 February 1979) is a female Chinese middle-distance runner.

On 18 October 1997 in Shanghai she ran the 1500 metres in 3:53.97 minutes. This ranks her eighth in the world of all time, behind Qu Yunxia, Jiang Bo, Lang Yinglai, Wang Junxia, Tatyana Kazankina, Yin Lili and Paula Ivan.

At the 1998 World Junior Championships she won the 1500 metres.

== Achievements ==
Year	Competition	Venue	Position	Event	Notes
Representing China
1998	World Junior Championships	Annecy, France	1st	1500m	4:10.05
1998	World Junior Championships	Annecy, France	4th	3000m	9:07.39
2001	East Asian Games	Osaka, Japan	3rd	1500 m	4:21.81
