= 2003 IAAF World Athletics Final – Results =

These are the results of the 2003 IAAF World Athletics Final, which took place in at the Stade Louis II in Monte Carlo, Monaco on 13–14 September. The hammer throw events were staged separately on 7 September in Szombathely, Hungary, due to stadium limitations in Monaco.

The competition replaced the IAAF Grand Prix Final, which had a varying set of events each year, with a full set programme of 33 track and field events. The year's top seven athletes, based on their IAAF World Rankings, qualified to compete in each event, with an extra four athletes selected for races of 1500 metres and above. One additional athlete, a wildcard, was allocated to each event by the IAAF and replacement athletes were admitted to replace the qualified athletes that could not attend the final.

Two national records were set at the competition, both in the long jump. Frenchwoman Eunice Barber cleared a French record of 7.05 m (23 ft 1 1/2 in) while Ignisious Gaisah set a men's Ghanaian record of 8.26 m (27 ft 1 in). Many of the events were affected by the presence of athletes involved in the BALCO scandal, with Dwain Chambers, Zhanna Block, Kelli White, Ramon Clay, Duane Ross, Kevin Toth and Jerome Young all being subsequently disqualified for doping. Young had won the men's 400 metres and White was the women's 200 metres winner.

== Track ==
Key

Wild card athlete

Events
100 m	200 m	400 m	800 m	1500 m	3000 m	5000 m	110/100 m h	400 m h	3000 m st

=== 100 metres ===
Men's
Rank	Athlete	Nation	Time (sec)	Reaction time	Notes
1	Bernard Williams	United States (USA)	10.04	0.136	SB
2	John Capel	United States (USA)	10.05	0.140	
3	Uchenna Emedolu	Nigeria (NGR)	10.08	0.150	SB
4	Justin Gatlin	United States (USA)	10.12	0.170	
5	Kim Collins	Saint Kitts and Nevis (SKN)	10.13	0.150	
6	Deji Aliu	Nigeria (NGR)	10.18	0.162	
7	Asafa Powell	Jamaica (JAM)	10.23	0.161	
—	Dwain Chambers	Great Britain (GBR)	10.10	0.176	DQ

Women's
Rank	Athlete	Nation	Time (sec)	Reaction time	Notes
1	Chryste Gaines	United States (USA)	10.86	0.140	PB
2	Christine Arron	France (FRA)	11.04	0.143	
3	Torri Edwards	United States (USA)	11.06	0.108	
4	Chandra Sturrup	Bahamas (BAH)	11.12	0.115	
5	Muriel Hurtis	France (FRA)	11.24	0.147	
6	Angela Williams	United States (USA)	11.38	0.145	
—	Zhanna Block	Ukraine (UKR)	11.27	0.118	DQ
—	Kelli White	United States (USA)	11.08	0.132	DQ

=== 200 metres ===
Men's
Rank	Athlete	Nation	Time (sec)	Reaction time	Notes
1	Joshua J. Johnson	United States (USA)	20.35	0.189	
2	Shawn Crawford	United States (USA)	20.37	0.151	
3	Stéphane Buckland	Mauritius (MRI)	20.44	0.161	
4	Darvis Patton	United States (USA)	20.46	0.151	
5	Marlon Devonish	Great Britain (GBR)	20.70	0.150	
6	Bernard Williams	United States (USA)	20.80	0.132	
—	Ramon Clay	United States (USA)	21.01	0.153	DQ
—	John Capel	United States (USA)	—	—	DNS

Women's
Rank	Athlete	Nation	Time (sec)	Reaction time	Notes
1	Muriel Hurtis	France (FRA)	22.41	0.164	SB
2	Anastasiya Kapachinskaya	Russia (RUS)	22.57	0.221	
3	Torri Edwards	United States (USA)	22.58	0.145	
4	Kim Gevaert	Belgium (BEL)	22.95	0.192	
5	Natallia Safronnikava	Belarus (BLR)	22.97	0.157	
6	Beverly McDonald	Jamaica (JAM)	23.01	0.184	
7	Cydonie Mothersille	Cayman Islands (CAY)	23.16	0.185	
—	Kelli White	United States (USA)	22.31	0.153	DQ

=== 400 metres ===
Men's
Rank	Athlete	Nation	Time (sec)	Reaction time	Notes
1	Michael Blackwood	Jamaica (JAM)	45.25	0.183	
2	Alleyne Francique	Grenada (GRN)	45.25	0.180	
3	Eric Milazar	Mauritius (MRI)	45.67	0.178	
4	David Canal	Spain (ESP)	45.82	0.157	
5	Marc Raquil	France (FRA)	45.96	0.203	
6	Cedric van Branteghem	Belgium (BEL)	46.02	0.149	
7	Brandon Simpson	Jamaica (JAM)	46.02	0.163	
—	Jerome Young	United States (USA)	45.04	0.144	DQ

Women's
Rank	Athlete	Nation	Time (sec)	Reaction time	Notes
1	Ana Guevara	Mexico (MEX)	49.34	0.199	
2	Lorraine Fenton	Jamaica (JAM)	50.29	0.205	
3	Tonique Williams-Darling	Bahamas (BAH)	50.87	0.163	
4	Amy Mbacké Thiam	Senegal (SEN)	51.06	0.192	
5	Olesya Zykina	Russia (RUS)	51.81	0.187	
6	Natalya Nazarova	Russia (RUS)	51.88	0.163	
7	Lee McConnell	Great Britain (GBR)	52.16	0.202	
8	Svetlana Pospelova	Russia (RUS)	53.72	0.152	

=== 800 metres ===
Men's
Rank	Athlete	Nation	Time (min)	Notes
1	Wilfred Bungei	Kenya (KEN)	1:45.97	
2	Joseph Mwengi Mutua	Kenya (KEN)	1:46.13	
3	André Bucher	Switzerland (SUI)	1:46.28	
4	Wilson Kipketer	Denmark (DEN)	1:46.40	
5	Mbulaeni Mulaudzi	South Africa (RSA)	1:46.42	
6	Hezekiél Sepeng	South Africa (RSA)	1:46.61	
7	Andrea Longo	Italy (ITA)	1:47.12	
8	Yuriy Borzakovskiy	Russia (RUS)	1:47.42	

Women's
Rank	Athlete	Nation	Time (min)	Notes
1	Maria de Lurdes Mutola	Mozambique (MOZ)	1:59.59	
2	Kelly Holmes	Great Britain (GBR)	1:59.92	
3	Mina Aït Hammou	Morocco (MAR)	1:59.97	
4	Faith Macharia	Kenya (KEN)	2:00.44	
5	Diane Cummins	Canada (CAN)	2:00.70	
6	Jolanda Batageli	Slovenia (SLO)	2:00.91	
7	Natalya Khrushcheleva	Russia (RUS)	2:00.96	
8	Claudia Gesell	Germany (GER)	2:03.66	

=== 1500 metres ===
Men's
Rank	Athlete	Nation	Time (min)	Notes
1	Paul Korir	Kenya (KEN)	3:40.09	
2	Alex Kipchirchir Rono	Kenya (KEN)	3:40.21	
3	Ivan Heshko	Ukraine (UKR)	3:40.72	
4	Rui Silva	Portugal (POR)	3:41.10	
5	Laban Rotich	Kenya (KEN)	3:41.12	
6	Cornelius Chirchir	Kenya (KEN)	3:41.77	
7	Robert Rono	Kenya (KEN)	3:41.89	
8	Benjamin Kipkurui	Kenya (KEN)	3:42.27	
9	Vyacheslav Shabunin	Russia (RUS)	3:42.72	
10	Adrian Blincoe	New Zealand (NZL)	3:43.28	
11	Abdelkader Hachlaf	Morocco (MAR)	3:45.48	
—	Hicham El Guerrouj	Morocco (MAR)	—	DNS

Women's
Rank	Athlete	Nation	Time (min)	Notes
1	Süreyya Ayhan	Turkey (TUR)	3:57.72	
2	Jackline Maranga	Kenya (KEN)	4:01.48	
3	Hayley Tullett	Great Britain (GBR)	4:01.60	
4	Joanne Pavey	Great Britain (GBR)	4:01.79	PB
5	Judit Varga	Hungary (HUN)	4:02.42	
6	Naomi Mugo	Kenya (KEN)	4:02.63	
7	Tatyana Tomashova	Russia (RUS)	4:02.78	
8	Yekaterina Rozenberg	Russia (RUS)	4:02.82	
9	Yelena Zadorozhnaya	Russia (RUS)	4:03.71	
10	Iryna Lishchynska	Ukraine (UKR)	4:03.89	
11	Alesia Turava	Belarus (BLR)	4:04.24	
12	Natalya Gorelova	Russia (RUS)	4:04.31	

=== 3000 metres ===
Men's
Rank	Athlete	Nation	Time (min)	Notes
1	Kenenisa Bekele	Ethiopia (ETH)	7:36.98	
2	John Kemboi Kibowen	Kenya (KEN)	7:38.21	
3	Abraham Chebii	Kenya (KEN)	7:39.28	SB
4	Leonard Mucheru Maina	Kenya (KEN)	7:40.20	
5	James Kwalia C'Kurui	Kenya (KEN)	7:41.40	
6	Benjamin Limo	Kenya (KEN)	7:44.25	
7	Luke Kipkosgei	Kenya (KEN)	7:44.94	
8	Craig Mottram	Australia (AUS)	7:48.76	SB
9	Jesús España	Spain (ESP)	7:57.33	
—	Ismaïl Sghyr	France (FRA)	—	DNS

Women's
Rank	Athlete	Nation	Time (min)	Notes
1	Edith Masai	Kenya (KEN)	8:36.82	SB
2	Yelena Zadorozhnaya	Russia (RUS)	8:37.40	
3	Joanne Pavey	Great Britain (GBR)	8:37.89	SB
4	Meseret Defar	Ethiopia (ETH)	8:38.31	PB
5	Berhane Adere	Ethiopia (ETH)	8:39.26	
6	Zakia Mrisho	Tanzania (TAN)	8:46.77	PB
7	Zhor El Kamch	Morocco (MAR)	8:49.52	
8	Inna Poluškina	Latvia (LAT)	9:04.23	
9	Carla Sacramento	Portugal (POR)	9:23.14	

=== 5000 metres ===
Men's
Rank	Athlete	Nation	Time (min)	Notes
1	Eliud Kipchoge	Kenya (KEN)	13:23.34	
2	Richard Limo	Kenya (KEN)	13:23.95	
3	Gebregziabher Gebremariam	Ethiopia (ETH)	13:24.13	
4	Sammy Kipketer	Kenya (KEN)	13:24.19	
5	Sileshi Sihine	Ethiopia (ETH)	13:24.61	
6	Dejene Berhanu	Ethiopia (ETH)	13:24.88	
7	Nicholas Kemboi	Kenya (KEN)	13:24.89	
8	Charles Waweru Kamathi	Kenya (KEN)	13:34.65	
9	Moses Cheruiyot Mosop	Kenya (KEN)	13:35.51	
10	Ahmad Hassan Abdullah	Qatar (QAT)	13:37.44	

Women's
Rank	Athlete	Nation	Time (min)	Notes
1	Elvan Abeylegesse	Turkey (TUR)	14:56.25	
2	Derartu Tulu	Ethiopia (ETH)	14:56.93	
3	Tirunesh Dibaba	Ethiopia (ETH)	14:57.87	
4	Werknesh Kidane	Ethiopia (ETH)	14:58.13	
5	Isabella Ochichi	Kenya (KEN)	15:00.04	
6	Benita Willis	Australia (AUS)	15:11.69	
7	Sentayehu Ejigu	Ethiopia (ETH)	15:25.60	
8	Alla Zhilyaeva	Russia (RUS)	15:41.86	
9	Iness Chepkesis Chenonge	Kenya (KEN)	15:49.14	
—	Yesenia Centeno	Spain (ESP)	—	DNS

=== 110/100 metres hurdles ===
Men's
Rank	Athlete	Nation	Time (sec)	Reaction time	Notes
1	Allen Johnson	United States (USA)	13.11	0.154	
2	Terrence Trammell	United States (USA)	13.17	0.128	SB
3	Stanislavs Olijars	Latvia (LAT)	13.25	0.141	
4	Liu Xiang	China (CHN)	13.27	0.140	
5	Chris Phillips	United States (USA)	13.33	0.133	
6	Ron Bramlett	United States (USA)	13.48	0.143	
7	Larry Wade	United States (USA)	14.10	0.157	
—	Duane Ross	United States (USA)	13.46	0.131	DQ

Women's
Rank	Athlete	Nation	Time (sec)	Reaction time	Notes
1	Gail Devers	United States (USA)	12.45	0.127	WL
2	Glory Alozie	Spain (ESP)	12.66	0.143	SB
3	Miesha McKelvy-Jones	United States (USA)	12.69	0.139	
4	Jenny Adams	United States (USA)	12.78	0.163	
5	Patricia Girard	France (FRA)	13.00	0.141	
6	Melissa Morrison-Howard	United States (USA)	13.05	0.143	
7	Lacena Golding-Clarke	Jamaica (JAM)	13.10	0.144	
8	Brigitte Foster-Hylton	Jamaica (JAM)	13.26	0.137	

=== 400 metres hurdles ===
Men's
Rank	Athlete	Nation	Time (sec)	Reaction time	Notes
1	Felix Sánchez	Dominican Republic (DOM)	47.80	0.189	
2	Kemel Thompson	Jamaica (JAM)	48.50	0.194	
3	Danny McFarlane	Jamaica (JAM)	48.66	0.166	
4	Joey Woody	United States (USA)	48.73	0.159	
5	Dean Griffiths	Jamaica (JAM)	49.18	0.168	
6	Periklís Iakovákis	Greece (GRE)	49.25	0.175	
7	Eric Thomas	United States (USA)	49.47	0.161	
8	Chris Rawlinson	Great Britain (GBR)	50.67	0.171	

Women's
Rank	Athlete	Nation	Time (sec)	Reaction time	Notes
1	Sandra Glover	United States (USA)	53.65	0.178	
2	Andrea Blackett	Barbados (BAR)	54.28	0.262	
3	Ionela Târlea	Romania (ROU)	54.44	0.156	
4	Tetiana Tereschuk-Antipova	Ukraine (UKR)	54.63	0.254	
5	Brenda Taylor	United States (USA)	54.93	0.178	
6	Tasha Danvers	Great Britain (GBR)	55.54	0.147	
7	Monika Niederstatter	Italy (ITA)	56.84	0.207	
—	Surita Febbraio	South Africa (RSA)	—	0.173	DNF

=== 3000 metres steeplechase ===
Men's
Rank	Athlete	Nation	Time (min)	Notes
1	Saif Saaeed Shaheen	Qatar (QAT)	7:57.38	WL
2	Paul Kipsiele Koech	Kenya (KEN)	7:57.42	PB
3	Ezekiel Kemboi	Kenya (KEN)	8:11.79	
4	Julius Nyamu	Kenya (KEN)	8:14.04	
5	Bouabdellah Tahri	France (FRA)	8:15.60	
6	Eliseo Martín	Spain (ESP)	8:16.38	
7	Ali Ezzine	Morocco (MAR)	8:18.05	
8	Luis Miguel Martín	Spain (ESP)	8:23.66	
9	Simon Vroemen	Netherlands (NED)	8:26.97	
10	Abraham Cherono	Kenya (KEN)	8:35.67	
11	Wilson Boit Kipketer	Kenya (KEN)	8:36.52	
—	Kipkirui Misoi	Kenya (KEN)	—	DNF

== Field ==
Events
High jump	Pole vault	Long jump	Triple jump	Shot put	Discus	Hammer	Javelin

=== High jump ===
Men's
Rank	Athlete	Nation	Result (m)	Notes	2.13	2.18	2.23	2.27	2.30	2.33
1	Yaroslav Rybakov	Russia (RUS)	2.30		-	O	XXO	XO	O	XXX
2	Stefan Holm	Sweden (SWE)	2.30		-	O	O	O	XO	XXX
3	Jamie Nieto	United States (USA)	2.30	PB	-	O	X-	O	XXO	XXX
4	Jacques Freitag	South Africa (RSA)	2.27		-	O	O	O	XX-	X
4	Germaine Mason	Jamaica (JAM)	2.27		-	O	-	O	XXX	
6	Andriy Sokolovskyy	Ukraine (UKR)	2.27		-	O	XO	O	XXX	
7	Mark Boswell	Canada (CAN)	2.27		-	-	XO	XXO	X-	XX
8	Matt Hemingway	United States (USA)	2.23		-	XO	XO	XXX		

Women's
Rank	Athlete	Nation	Result (m)	Notes	1.83	1.88	1.92	1.96	1.99	2.01	2.03
1	Hestrie Cloete	South Africa (RSA)	2.01		-	O	O	O	XO	XO	XXX
2	Vita Palamar	Ukraine (UKR)	2.01	PB	O	O	O	XO	XO	XXO	XXX
3	Kajsa Bergqvist	Sweden (SWE)	1.99		O	O	O	O	O	XXX	
4	Blanka Vlašić	Croatia (CRO)	1.96		-	O	O	O	XXX		
5	Inha Babakova	Ukraine (UKR)	1.96		O	O	O	XO	XXX		
6	Marina Kuptsova	Russia (RUS)	1.92		XO	XO	O	XXX			
7	Yelena Yelesina	Russia (RUS)	1.88		O	O	XXX				
8	Anna Chicherova	Russia (RUS)	1.83		XXO						

=== Pole vault ===
Men's
Rank	Athlete	Nation	Result (m)	Notes	5.45	5.60	5.70	5.76	5.81	5.86	5.91	5.96	6.01
1	Tim Lobinger	Germany (GER)	5.91	SB	-	XO	-	O	XO	XX-	O	XX-	X
2	Okkert Brits	South Africa (RSA)	5.86	SB	-	XO	-	XO	XO	XO	-	XXX	
3	Dmitri Markov	Australia (AUS)	5.76		-	O	-	O	-	XX-	X		
4	Jeff Hartwig	United States (USA)	5.70		XO	O	O	XXX					
5	Derek Miles	United States (USA)	5.70		O	O	XO	XXX					
6	Giuseppe Gibilisco	Italy (ITA)	5.60		-	O	-	XX-	X				
7	Romain Mesnil	France (FRA)	5.45		XO	-	XXX						
—	Nick Hysong	United States (USA)	NM		-	XXX							

Women's
Rank	Athlete	Nation	Result (m)	Notes	4.25	4.40	4.50	4.60	4.68	4.73
1	Tatyana Polnova	Russia (RUS)	4.68		O	XO	XO	O	XO	XXX
2	Svetlana Feofanova	Russia (RUS)	4.60		-	XO	O	O	XX-	X
3	Stacy Dragila	United States (USA)	4.50		O	O	O	XXX		
4	Monika Pyrek	Poland (POL)	4.50		O	XO	XXO	XXX		
5	Elena Isinbaeva	Russia (RUS)	4.40		-	O	XXX			
6	Annika Becker	Germany (GER)	4.40		O	XXO	XXX			
7	Vanessa Boslak	France (FRA)	4.25		XO	XXX				
—	Yvonne Buschbaum	Germany (GER)	NM		XXX					

=== Long jump ===
Men's
Rank	Athlete	Nation	Result (m)	Wind	Notes	1	2	3	4
1	Dwight Phillips	United States (USA)	8.31	+0.1		X -0.4	8.27 +0.4	8.31 +0.1	8.02 +0.6
2	Hussein Taher Al-Sabee	Saudi Arabia (KSA)	8.30	+0.4	SB	7.82 -0.2	8.30 +0.4	7.81 -0.1	8.16 +0.0
3	Ignisious Gaisah	Ghana (GHA)	8.26	+0.1	NR	8.01 +0.5	7.94 -0.5	8.23 -0.1	8.26 +0.1
4	Savanté Stringfellow	United States (USA)	8.17	0.0		X -0.1	8.13 +0.5	X +0.2	8.17 +0.0
5	Yago Lamela	Spain (ESP)	8.00	+0.2		X +0.1	X -0.1	8.00 +0.2	X -0.1
6	Volodymyr Zyuskov	Ukraine (UKR)	7.94	+0.2		7.68 -0.4	X -0.2	7.94 +0.2	X -0.3
7	James Beckford	Jamaica (JAM)	7.93	+0.1		7.76 +0.1	X +1.1	7.93 +0.1	7.84 -0.1
8	Loúis Tsátoumas	Greece (GRE)	7.22	-0.1		7.22 -0.1	X +0.0	-	-

Women's
Rank	Athlete	Nation	Result (m)	Wind	Notes	1	2	3	4
1	Eunice Barber	France (FRA)	7.05	-0.4	NR	X -0.1	6.75 -0.5	6.80 +1.1	7.05 -0.4
2	Tatyana Kotova	Russia (RUS)	6.92	-0.3		X -0.9	6.63 -0.8	6.92 -0.3	X -1.1
3	Grace Upshaw	United States (USA)	6.60	-0.3		6.48 -0.9	X +0.1	6.60 -0.3	X +0.1
4	Olga Rublyova	Russia (RUS)	6.57	-0.4		6.57 -0.4	X -0.5	X +0.2	X -0.8
5	Anju Bobby George	India (IND)	6.50	-0.9		6.49 -0.6	X -0.8	X -0.9	6.50 -0.9
6	Elva Goulbourne	Jamaica (JAM)	6.49	-0.4		X +0.3	6.49 -0.4	X -0.3	6.42 -0.3
7	Concepción Montaner	Spain (ESP)	6.45	-0.2		6.42 +0.0	X -0.5	6.40 -0.9	6.45 -0.2
—	Tünde Vaszi	Hungary (HUN)	NM	-0.4		X -0.4	X +0.5	X	-

=== Triple jump ===
Men's
Rank	Athlete	Nation	Result (m)	Wind	Notes	1	2	3	4
1	Christian Olsson	Sweden (SWE)	17.55	-0.1		17.09 +0.3	17.55 -0.1	17.48 -0.3	-
2	Walter Davis	United States (USA)	17.09	-0.7		14.97 -0.1	16.50 -1.3	-	17.09 -0.7
3	Kenta Bell	United States (USA)	16.95	+0.5		16.43 +0.5	16.95 +0.5	X -0.4	16.86 -0.3
4	Jadel Gregório	Brazil (BRA)	16.91	+0.5		16.91 +0.5	X -0.1	16.60 +0.9	16.85 +0.2
5	Ivaylo Rusenov	Bulgaria (BUL)	16.70	+1.0		16.28 -0.1	X +0.1	X +0.3	16.70 +1.0
6	Alexander Martínez	Cuba (CUB)	16.60	-0.2		16.60 -0.2	16.40 +0.7	X -0.2	16.53 -0.9
7	Leevan Sands	Bahamas (BAH)	16.40	0.0		15.91 -1.0	15.84 -0.7	16.40 +0.0	X -0.1
8	Sébastien Pincemail	France (FRA)	16.12	-0.6		16.12 -0.6	X	X -0.6	X +0.4

Women's
Rank	Athlete	Nation	Result (m)	Wind	Notes	1	2	3	4
1	Tatyana Lebedeva	Russia (RUS)	15.13	+0.1		14.71 -0.1	15.01 +0.0	15.04 +0.3	15.13 +0.1
2	Yamilé Aldama	Cuba (CUB)	14.99	+0.1		X +0.1	14.90 +0.2	14.99 +0.1	14.99 +0.1
3	Françoise Mbango Etone	Cameroon (CMR)	14.83	0.0		X +0.4	14.83 +0.0	X +0.0	14.82 +0.2
4	Anna Pyatykh	Russia (RUS)	14.55	+0.8		14.26 +0.3	14.31 +0.1	14.42 +0.0	14.55 +0.8
5	Magdelín Martínez	Italy (ITA)	14.52	+0.1		14.51 +0.2	14.52 +0.1	14.04 -0.7	14.41 +0.2
6	Olena Hovorova	Ukraine (UKR)	14.46	+0.5		X +0.5	14.22 -0.3	X -0.1	14.46 +0.5
7	Adelina Gavrilă	Romania (ROU)	14.44	+0.7		14.39 +0.0	14.34 +0.3	14.44 +0.7	14.34 +0.0
8	Kéné Ndoye	Senegal (SEN)	14.02	-0.3		13.53 +0.7	X -0.2	X +0.1	14.02 -0.3

=== Shot put ===
Men's
Rank	Athlete	Nation	Result (m)	Notes	1	2	3	4
1	Christian Cantwell	United States (USA)	20.93		20.45	20.93	X	X
2	Yuriy Bilonoh	Ukraine (UKR)	20.53		20.20	20.53	X	20.44
3	Andrei Mikhnevich	Belarus (BLR)	20.51		X	20.51	20.41	20.41
4	Manuel Martínez Gutiérrez	Spain (ESP)	20.32		X	20.32	X	20.09
5	Adam Nelson	United States (USA)	20.15		19.89	X	20.15	X
6	Justin Anlezark	Australia (AUS)	19.96		18.59	18.79	19.20	19.96
7	Milan Haborák	Slovakia (SVK)	18.97		X	X	18.97	X
—	Kevin Toth	United States (USA)	19.50	DQ	19.50	X	X	X

Women's
Rank	Athlete	Nation	Result (m)	Notes	1	2	3	4
1	Vita Pavlysh	Ukraine (UKR)	19.86		18.69	19.86	18.32	X
2	Svetlana Krivelyova	Russia (RUS)	19.66		18.15	19.66	19.21	19.10
3	Nadzeya Ostapchuk	Belarus (BLR)	19.51		19.28	18.86	19.51	X
4	Astrid Kumbernuss	Germany (GER)	18.89		18.08	18.46	18.89	18.61
5	Irina Korzhanenko	Russia (RUS)	18.48		18.23	18.48	18.03	X
6	Nadine Kleinert	Germany (GER)	18.15		X	17.75	18.15	X
7	Elisângela Adriano	Brazil (BRA)	17.92		17.10	17.92	17.78	X
8	Krystyna Zabawska	Poland (POL)	17.85		17.63	X	17.85	X

=== Discus throw ===
Men's
Rank	Athlete	Nation	Result (m)	Notes	1	2	3	4
1	Virgilijus Alekna	Lithuania (LTU)	68.30		68.30	X	66.95	67.96
2	Róbert Fazekas	Hungary (HUN)	66.08		66.08	X	65.00	64.71
3	Vasili Kaptyukh	Belarus (BLR)	65.85		61.54	64.54	64.79	65.85
4	Lars Riedel	Germany (GER)	65.74		63.78	64.53	64.11	65.74
5	Michael Möllenbeck	Germany (GER)	64.36		X	64.36	62.83	X
6	Aleksander Tammert	Estonia (EST)	64.02		61.84	64.02	X	X
7	Frantz Kruger	South Africa (RSA)	60.05		X	60.05	X	X
8	Mario Pestano	Spain (ESP)	59.96		X	59.96	X	X

Women's
Rank	Athlete	Nation	Result (m)	Notes	1	2	3	4
1	Vera Pospíšilová-Cechlová	Czech Republic (CZE)	65.42		X	65.42	X	62.20
2	Aretha Thurmond	United States (USA)	65.10	SB	X	65.10	63.03	64.53
3	Ekateríni Vóggoli	Greece (GRE)	63.55		63.55	63.02	61.54	X
4	Olena Antonova	Ukraine (UKR)	63.04		60.31	63.04	61.27	60.92
5	Natalya Sadova	Russia (RUS)	62.00		X	X	61.65	62.00
6	Franka Dietzsch	Germany (GER)	61.88		61.88	59.78	59.28	X
7	Beatrice Faumuina	New Zealand (NZL)	61.81		X	56.98	61.81	57.68
8	Iryna Yatchenko	Belarus (BLR)	60.96		60.08	X	60.96	58.46

=== Hammer throw ===
Men's
Rank	Athlete	Nation	Result (m)	Notes	1	2	3	4	5	6
1	Adrián Annus	Hungary (HUN)	82.10		79.68	81.11	82.10	X	-	-
2	Libor Charfreitag	Slovakia (SVK)	81.22		X	X	X	78.19	X	81.22
3	Ivan Tsikhan	Belarus (BLR)	80.84		78.84	78.14	80.84	X	78.26	80.83
4	Koji Murofushi	Japan (JPN)	79.12		X	X	79.07	78.45	79.12	78.63
5	Andriy Skvaruk	Ukraine (UKR)	78.76		77.88	78.11	77.46	78.24	78.76	78.34
6	Primož Kozmus	Slovenia (SLO)	78.59		76.98	X	X	X	X	78.59
7	Ilya Konovalov	Russia (RUS)	78.57		75.38	78.57	76.86	X	X	X
8	Karsten Kobs	Germany (GER)	74.18		X	70.33	73.36	74.18	X	-

Women's
Rank	Athlete	Nation	Result (m)	Notes	1	2	3	4	5	6
1	Yipsi Moreno	Cuba (CUB)	73.42		71.68	73.42	70.95	70.75	X	X
2	Olga Kuzenkova	Russia (RUS)	71.16		71.16	X	69.69	X	70.68	70.94
3	Mihaela Melinte	Romania (ROU)	69.27		64.65	68.93	69.27	X	68.76	67.59
4	Manuela Montebrun	France (FRA)	68.88		62.73	68.88	66.34	66.42	X	66.39
5	Susanne Keil	Germany (GER)	67.78		67.78	X	X	67.74	X	X
6	Anna Mahon	United States (USA)	66.94		64.54	X	66.94	X	65.85	62.98
7	Iryna Sekachova	Ukraine (UKR)	66.46		X	66.28	X	63.67	X	66.46
8	Kamila Skolimowska	Poland (POL)	61.46		X	X	61.46	59.14	X	61.00

=== Javelin throw ===
Men's
Rank	Athlete	Nation	Result (m)	Notes	1	2	3	4
1	Sergey Makarov	Russia (RUS)	85.66		74.08	85.66	81.70	X
2	Jan Zelezný	Czech Republic (CZE)	84.33		77.86	83.82	84.33	81.08
3	Boris Henry	Germany (GER)	81.00		77.47	X	X	81.00
4	Aleksandr Ivanov	Russia (RUS)	80.58		X	79.36	80.58	78.74
5	Andrus Värnik	Estonia (EST)	80.43		80.43	78.22	77.44	X
6	Peter Blank	Germany (GER)	77.39		60.31	70.45	75.00	77.39
7	Christian Nicolay	Germany (GER)	77.02		74.71	70.97	75.75	77.02
8	Eriks Rags	Latvia (LAT)	72.20		72.20	X	X	-

Women's
Rank	Athlete	Nation	Result (m)	Notes	1	2	3	4
1	Tatyana Shikolenko	Russia (RUS)	64.47		63.53	64.47	X	61.48
2	Steffi Nerius	Germany (GER)	64.25		64.25	63.24	63.10	63.00
3	Nikolett Szabó	Hungary (HUN)	62.88	SB	53.27	62.88	59.72	X
4	Lavern Eve	Bahamas (BAH)	62.10		62.10	X	X	55.02
5	Mikaela Ingberg	Finland (FIN)	61.29		X	56.95	57.06	61.29
6	Valeriya Zabruskova	Russia (RUS)	60.67		55.86	58.48	60.05	60.67
7	Claudia Coslovich	Italy (ITA)	58.61		55.49	56.89	58.61	X
8	Paula Tarvainen	Finland (FIN)	57.36		57.36	X	57.06	X
