= Shigeyuki Kojima =

Japanese sprinter (born 1979)

Personal information
- Nationality: Japan
- Born: 25 September 1979 (age 47) Sakura, Chiba, Japan
- Education: Waseda University
- Height: 1.73 m (5 ft 8 in)
- Weight: 68 kg (150 lb)

Sport
- Sport: Track and field
- Event: 100 metres
- Retired: 2009

Achievements and titles
- Personal best: 100 m: 10.20 (Kobe 2000)
Medal record
Men's athletics
Representing Asia
World Cup
Bronze medal – third place	2006 Athens	4×100 m relay

Shigeyuki Kojima (小島 茂之, Kojima Shigeyuki; born 25 September 1979) is a retired Japanese sprinter. He competed in the 100 metres and 4 × 100 metres relay at the 2000 Olympic Games. He was also selected as a reserve for the 100 metres at the 2007 World Championships, but he did not compete.

== Achievements ==
Year	Competition	Venue	Position	Event	Notes
Representing Japan and Asia (World Cup only)
1998	World Junior Championships	Annecy, France	8th	100 m	10.76 (wind: +1.6 m/s)
1998	World Junior Championships	Annecy, France	— (h)	4×100 m relay	DNF
2000	Olympic Games	Sydney, Australia	60th (h)	100 m	10.59 (wind: -1.0 m/s)
2000	Olympic Games	Sydney, Australia	6th	4×100 m relay	38.66
2006	World Cup	Athens, Greece	3rd	4×100 m relay	38.51
2006	Asian Games	Doha, Qatar	6th	100 m	10.57 (wind: 0.0 m/s)

== Personal bests ==
Event	Time (s)	Venue	Date	Notes
100 m	10.20 (+1.5 m/s)	Kobe, Japan	2 July 2000	
100 m	10.12 (+3.3 m/s)	Shizuoka, Japan	3 October 1999	Wind-assisted
