= 1998 World Junior Championships in Athletics – Men's triple jump =

The men's triple jump event at the 1998 World Junior Championships in Athletics was held in Annecy, France, at Parc des Sports on 31 July and 1 August.

== Medalists ==
Gold	Ionuț Pungă; Romania
Silver	Ivaylo Rusenov; Bulgaria
Bronze	Gregory Yeldell; United States

== Results ==
=== Final ===
1 August

Rank	Name	Nationality	Attempts						Result	Notes
Rank	Name	Nationality	1	2	3	4	5	6	Result	Notes
1st place, gold medalist(s)	Ionuț Pungă	Romania	16.47 (w: -1.5 m/s)	16.63 (w: -1.3 m/s)	x	16.66 (w: +1.0 m/s)	16.94 (w: +0.4 m/s)	16.91 (w: -0.2 m/s)	16.94 (w: +0.4 m/s)	
2nd place, silver medalist(s)	Ivaylo Rusenov	Bulgaria	15.91 (w: -0.9 m/s)	16.11 (w: -1.1 m/s)	x	16.01 (w: -0.8 m/s)	16.65 (w: +0.5 m/s)	16.15 (w: +0.1 m/s)	16.65 (w: +0.5 m/s)	
3rd place, bronze medalist(s)	Gregory Yeldell	United States	x	x	15.86 (w: -0.2 m/s)	15.70 (w: -1.1 m/s)	16.31 (w: +0.4 m/s)	16.44 (w: -0.1 m/s)	16.44 (w: -0.1 m/s)	
4	Chris Hercules	United States	15.71 (w: -1.3 m/s)	x	x	15.15 (w: -0.7 m/s)	x	16.27 (w: +1.0 m/s)	16.27 (w: +1.0 m/s)	
5	Zhao Zongming	China	16.14 (w: -0.6 m/s)	x	x	15.29 (w: -1.0 m/s)	x	x	16.14 (w: -0.6 m/s)	
6	Sébastien Pincemail	France	15.58 (w: -1.0 m/s)	15.79 (w: -1.6 m/s)	15.86 (w: -0.4 m/s)	15.63 (w: +0.7 m/s)	15.84 (w: +0.4 m/s)	16.03 (w: +0.3 m/s)	16.03 (w: +0.3 m/s)	
7	Sergey Bochkov	Azerbaijan	15.89 (w: -1.2 m/s)	16.00 (w: -0.1 m/s)	15.73 (w: -0.6 m/s)	15.61 (w: +0.2 m/s)	15.83 (w: +0.3 m/s)	x	16.00 (w: -0.1 m/s)	
8	Michał Joachimowski	Poland	15.29 (w: -1.6 m/s)	15.69 (w: -0.7 m/s)	15.71 (w: -0.8 m/s)	x	15.00 (w: +2.0 m/s)	15.56 (w: -1.2 m/s)	15.71 (w: -0.8 m/s)	
9	Daniel Donovici	Romania	15.50 (w: -1.5 m/s)	15.68 (w: -0.2 m/s)	15.38 (w: +0.7 m/s)				15.68 (w: -0.2 m/s)	
10	Thierry Moreau	France	15.26 (w: -1.6 m/s)	x	15.64 (w: -0.9 m/s)				15.64 (w: -0.9 m/s)	
11	Sergey Khurbatov	Belarus	15.54 (w: -1.0 m/s)	15.59 (w: +0.7 m/s)	15.41 (w: -0.3 m/s)				15.59 (w: +0.7 m/s)	
12	Danial Jahic	Yugoslavia	15.13 (w: -0.9 m/s)	15.38 (w: -1.2 m/s)	15.42 (w: -1.9 m/s)				15.42 (w: -1.9 m/s)	

=== Qualifications ===
31 Jul

==== Group A ====
Rank	Name	Nationality	Attempts			Result	Notes
Rank	Name	Nationality	1	2	3	Result	Notes
1	Gregory Yeldell	United States	15.69 (w: +0.8 m/s)	15.88 (w: -0.5 m/s)	16.37 (w: +0.1 m/s)	16.37 (w: +0.1 m/s)	Q
2	Zhao Zongming	China	16.21 (w: +0.3 m/s)	–	–	16.21 (w: +0.3 m/s)	Q
3	Sébastien Pincemail	France	16.05 (w: 0.0 m/s)	–	–	16.05 (w: 0.0 m/s)	Q
4	Michał Joachimowski	Poland	15.58 (w: -0.3 m/s)	15.70 (w: +0.7 m/s)	16.02 (w: +0.8 m/s)	16.02 (w: +0.8 m/s)	Q
5	Sergey Bochkov	Azerbaijan	15.97 (w: +0.2 m/s)	–	–	15.97 (w: +0.2 m/s)	Q
6	Daniel Donovici	Romania	15.72 (w: -0.7 m/s)	x	15.92 (w: +0.3 m/s)	15.92 (w: +0.3 m/s)	Q
7	Danial Jahic	Yugoslavia	15.29 (w: +0.8 m/s)	15.56 (w: -0.4 m/s)	15.80 (w: +0.2 m/s)	15.80 (w: +0.2 m/s)	q
8	Sergey Khurbatov	Belarus	15.74 (w: +0.3 m/s)	15.64 (w: -0.1 m/s)	15.78 (w: +0.1 m/s)	15.78 (w: +0.1 m/s)	q
9	Leevan Sands	Bahamas	15.70 (w: -0.1 m/s)	15.09 (w: -0.5 m/s)	15.58 (w: -0.3 m/s)	15.70 (w: -0.1 m/s)	
10	Ibrahim Abubaker	Qatar	14.84 (w: +1.2 m/s)	15.57 (w: 0.0 m/s)	14.90 (w: +0.3 m/s)	15.57 (w: 0.0 m/s)	
11	Pavel Kalinin	Russia	15.11 (w: +1.0 m/s)	15.34 (w: -0.2 m/s)	15.52 (w: +0.4 m/s)	15.52 (w: +0.4 m/s)	
12	Mikola Mestechkin	Ukraine	15.48 (w: +0.4 m/s)	x	15.44 (w: +0.7 m/s)	15.48 (w: +0.4 m/s)	
13	Yasmin Mustafov	Bulgaria	15.11 (w: +0.6 m/s)	15.01 (w: -0.5 m/s)	15.41 (w: -0.3 m/s)	15.41 (w: -0.3 m/s)	
14	Nicholas Thomas	United Kingdom	15.07 (w: 0.0 m/s)	14.77 (w: -0.8 m/s)	15.40 (w: +0.3 m/s)	15.40 (w: +0.3 m/s)	
15	Alexandros Malamas	Greece	x	15.23 (w: +0.8 m/s)	15.14 (w: +1.1 m/s)	15.23 (w: +0.8 m/s)	

==== Group B ====
Rank	Name	Nationality	Attempts			Result	Notes
Rank	Name	Nationality	1	2	3	Result	Notes
1	Ionuț Pungă	Romania	x	16.14 (w: -0.3 m/s)	–	16.14 (w: -0.3 m/s)	Q
2	Ivaylo Rusenov	Bulgaria	15.98 (w: +0.7 m/s)	–	–	15.98 (w: +0.7 m/s)	Q
3	Chris Hercules	United States	15.97 (w: +0.8 m/s)	–	–	15.97 (w: +0.8 m/s)	Q
4	Thierry Moreau	France	14.96 (w: +0.3 m/s)	15.85 (w: +0.1 m/s)	15.28 (w: +0.3 m/s)	15.85 (w: +0.1 m/s)	q
5	Mohd Abdulaziz	Qatar	15.28 (w: +0.3 m/s)	15.30 (w: +0.3 m/s)	15.70 (w: +0.7 m/s)	15.70 (w: +0.7 m/s)	
6	Janne Harju	Finland	15.55 (w: +1.1 m/s)	13.67 (w: -0.8 m/s)	15.64 (w: +0.2 m/s)	15.64 (w: +0.2 m/s)	
7	Yuriy Opatskiy	Ukraine	15.61 (w: +0.4 m/s)	15.31 (w: +0.2 m/s)	15.56 (w: -0.1 m/s)	15.61 (w: +0.4 m/s)	
8	Jon Wallace	United Kingdom	15.53 (w: 0.0 m/s)	x	15.39 (w: +1.1 m/s)	15.53 (w: 0.0 m/s)	
9	Sergey Pavlov	Russia	x	14.89 (w: +0.2 m/s)	15.43 (w: +0.4 m/s)	15.43 (w: +0.4 m/s)	
10	Ilja Tumorin	Estonia	14.89 (w: -1.0 m/s)	x	15.25 (w: -0.4 m/s)	15.25 (w: -0.4 m/s)	
11	Zhou Can	China	15.00 (w: -0.2 m/s)	14.84 (w: -0.5 m/s)	15.24 (w: -0.1 m/s)	15.24 (w: -0.1 m/s)	
12	Kostas Zalagítis	Greece	14.82 (w: +0.5 m/s)	13.82 (w: -0.2 m/s)	15.21 (w: +1.0 m/s)	15.21 (w: +1.0 m/s)	
13	Masashi Watanabe	Japan	x	15.18 (w: -1.1 m/s)	x	15.18 (w: -1.1 m/s)	
14	Sanjay Kumar Rai	India	x	14.84 (w: +0.1 m/s)	14.69 (w: -0.3 m/s)	14.84 (w: +0.1 m/s)	
15	Thierry Adanabou	Burkina Faso	x	14.52 (w: +0.9 m/s)	14.23 (w: +0.5 m/s)	14.52 (w: +0.9 m/s)	
16	François Loungou	Central African Republic	x	13.60 (w: -0.4 m/s)	x	13.60 (w: -0.4 m/s)	

== Participation ==
According to an unofficial count, 31 athletes from 21 countries participated in the event.

- Azerbaijan (1)
- Bahamas (1)
- Belarus (1)
- Bulgaria (2)
- Burkina Faso (1)
- Central African Republic (1)
- China (2)
- Estonia (1)
- Finland (1)
- France (2)
- Greece (2)
- India (1)
- Japan (1)
- Poland (1)
- Qatar (2)
- Romania (2)
- Russia (2)
- Ukraine (2)
- United Kingdom (2)
- United States (2)
- Yugoslavia (1)
