= Yoshiko Fujinaga =

Japanese long-distance runner

Yoshiko Fujinaga (藤永 佳子, Fujinaga Yoshiko; born August 15, 1981 in Saza, Nagasaki) is a female long-distance runner from Japan, who won the 2009 edition of the annual Nagoya Marathon on March 1, 2009, clocking a total time of 2:28:13. She is a one-time national champion in the women's 5,000 metres.

== Achievements ==
Year	Competition	Venue	Position	Event	Notes
Representing Japan
1998	World Junior Championships	Annecy, France	5th	3000 m	9:15.64
1999	World Championships	Seville, Spain	27th (h)	5000 m	15:51.52
2001	Universiade	Beijing, China	3rd	5000 m	15:43.94
2001	Universiade	Beijing, China	2nd	10,000 m	32:53.55
2001	East Asian Games	Osaka, Japan	3rd	10,000 m	32:47.21
2009	Nagoya Marathon	Nagoya, Japan	1st	Marathon	2:28:13
2009	World Championships	Berlin, Germany	14th	Marathon	2:29:53
