= Athletics at the 2001 Summer Universiade – Women's 10,000 metres =

The women's 10,000 metres event at the 2001 Summer Universiade was held in Beijing, China on 29 August.

== Results ==
Rank	Athlete	Nationality	Time	Notes
1st place, gold medalist(s)	Dong Yanmei	China	32:45.14	
2nd place, silver medalist(s)	Yoshiko Fujinaga	Japan	32:53.55	
3rd place, bronze medalist(s)	Yukiko Akaba	Japan	32:57.35	
4	Galina Aleksandrova	Russia	33:10.40	
5	Sara Day	United States	33:25.45	
6	Alessandra Aguilar	Spain	33:31.49	
7	Maggie Chan Man Yee	Hong Kong	33:38.85	
8	María Abel	Spain	33:47.08	
9	Hong Myong Hui	North Korea	34:13.36	
10	Janelle Kraus	United States	34:25.08	
11	Sylvia Chelimo	Uganda	34:58.36	
12	Lucélia Peres	Brazil	35:55.44	
13	Son Un Hui	North Korea	36:29.19	
	Olivera Jevtić	Yugoslavia	DNF	
