= Athletics at the 2001 Summer Universiade – Women's 5000 metres =

The women's 5000 metres event at the 2001 Summer Universiade was held in Beijing, China on 1 September.

== Results ==
Rank	Athlete	Nationality	Time	Notes
1st place, gold medalist(s)	Dong Yanmei	China	15:30.28	
2nd place, silver medalist(s)	Tatyana Khmeleva	Russia	15:43.18	
3rd place, bronze medalist(s)	Yoshiko Fujinaga	Japan	15:43.94	
4	Rosemary Ryan	Ireland	15:48.45	
5	Maggie Chan Man Yee	Hong Kong	16:05.86	
6	Maria Cristina Grosu	Romania	16:09.19	
7	Margarita Tapia	Mexico	16:10.02	
8	Yukiko Akaba	Japan	16:10.22	
9	Sin Myong Ae	North Korea	16:24.38	
10	Sylvia Chelimo	Uganda	16:34.96	
11	René Kalmer	South Africa	16:43.86	
12	Lucélia Peres	Brazil	17:00.16	
13	Heather MacDonald	Canada	17:06.24	
14	Melissa Gulli	United States	17:16.85	
15	Li Jingnan	China	17:25.78	
16	Hayley McGregor	Australia	17:34.05	
17	Hafida Izem	Morocco	17:58.73	
18	Stephanie Mills	Canada	18:01.82	
19	Saiphon Piawong	Thailand	18:46.74	
20	Celma Bonfim	São Tomé and Príncipe	18:59.62	
21	Karla Silva	Peru	19:22.36	
22	Magdalena Haamwanyena	Namibia	20:09.44	
	Sarah Glynn	United States	DNF	
	Cheptoo Matany	Kenya	DNS	
	Amal Al-Matary	Jordan	DNS	
	Olivera Jevtić	Yugoslavia	DNS	
	Anastasiya Zubova	Russia	DNS	
	Olga Roseyeva	Russia	DNS	
