= Colomba Fofana =

French triple jumper

Personal information
- Born: 11 April 1977 (age 49) Courbevoie, France

Sport
- Country: France
- Sport: Athletics
- Event: Triple jump

Colomba Fofana (born 11 April 1977 in Courbevoie) is a French triple jumper. His personal best jump is 17.34 metres, achieved in May 2008 in Forbach. He competed at the 2000 Summer Olympics, the 2008 Summer Olympics, and the 2006 World Indoor Championships, without reaching the final.

== Achievements ==
Year	Competition	Venue	Position	Event	Notes
Representing France
1996	World Junior Championships	Sydney, Australia	5th	Triple jump	16.09 m w (wind: +2.4 m/s)
1997	European U23 Championships	Turku, Finland	8th	Triple jump	15.83 m (wind: -1.1 m/s)
1998	European Championships	Budapest, Hungary	20th	Triple jump	16.16 m
1999	European U23 Championships	Gothenburg, Sweden	2nd	Triple jump	16.57 m (wind: +1.3 m/s)
