= 1999 European Athletics U23 Championships – Men's triple jump =

Athletic championship

The men's triple jump event at the 1999 European Athletics U23 Championships was held in Gothenburg, Sweden, at Ullevi on 29 and 30 July 1999.

== Medalists ==
Gold	Ionuț Pungă; Romania
Silver	Colomba Fofana; France
Bronze	Vasil Gergov; Bulgaria

== Results ==
=== Final ===
30 July

Rank	Name	Nationality	Attempts						Result	Notes
Rank	Name	Nationality	1	2	3	4	5	6	Result	Notes
1st place, gold medalist(s)	Ionuț Pungă	Romania	16.49 (w: 0.6 m/s)	x	16.73 (w: 0.9 m/s)	x	x	x	16.73 (w: 0.9 m/s)	
2nd place, silver medalist(s)	Colomba Fofana	France	16.30 (w: 0.9 m/s)	176.35 (w: 2.0 m/s)	16.27 (w: 1.2 m/s)	16.40 (w: 0.1 m/s)	16.29 (w: 1.4 m/s)	16.57 (w: 1.3 m/s)	16.57 (w: 1.3 m/s)	
3rd place, bronze medalist(s)	Vasil Gergov	Bulgaria	16.53 w (w: 3.4 m/s)	16.19 (w: 1.2 m/s)	15.54 (w: -0.9 m/s)	16.30 (w: 1.9 m/s)	16.01 w (w: 2.5 m/s)	15.96	16.53 w (w: 3.4 m/s)	
4	Ambrus Szabó	Hungary	x	15.94 (w: 1.9 m/s)	15.81 (w: -0.8 m/s)	16.08 (w: 0.2 m/s)	x	16.41 (w: 1.9 m/s)	16.41 (w: 1.9 m/s)	
5	Philips Idowu	United Kingdom	16.39 (w: 0.6 m/s)	15.96 (w: -0.8 m/s)	x	15.99 (w: 1.6 m/s)	15.88 (w: 1.5 m/s)	16.02 (w: 1.3 m/s)	16.39 (w: 0.6 m/s)	
6	Ivailo Rusenov	Bulgaria	x	16.15 (w: -0.2 m/s)	16.20 (w: 1.9 m/s)	16.23 (w: 1.5 m/s)	x	16.34 (w: 1.6 m/s)	16.34 (w: 1.6 m/s)	
7	Arnis Filet	France	15.90 (w: 0.5 m/s)	15.93 (w: 0.2 m/s)	15.86 w (w: 2.7 m/s)	x	16.12 (w: 1.6 m/s)	16.26 (w: 1.9 m/s)	16.26 (w: 1.9 m/s)	
8	Thomas Moede	Germany	16.15 (w: 0.3 m/s)	x	x	15.92 (w: -0.1 m/s)	x	x	16.15 (w: 0.3 m/s)	
9	Sébastien Pincemail	France	15.51 (w: 0.1 m/s)	15.55 (w: -0.3 m/s)	15.93 (w: 1.5 m/s)				15.93 (w: 1.5 m/s)	
10	Mikola Mestechkin	Ukraine	15.74 (w: 0.8 m/s)	x	15.53 (w: 1.2 m/s)				15.74 (w: 0.8 m/s)	
11	Pavel Kalinin	Russia	x	14.99 (w: 0.3 m/s)	x				14.99 (w: 0.3 m/s)	
12	Javier Asensio	Spain	x	x	13.75 (w: 1.5 m/s)				13.75 (w: 1.5 m/s)	

=== Qualifications ===
29 July
First 12 best to the Final

Rank	Name	Nationality	Result	Notes
1	Vasil Gergov	Bulgaria	16.39	Q
2	Thomas Moede	Germany	16.32	Q
3	Colomba Fofana	France	16.26	Q
4	Ionuț Pungă	Romania	16.24	Q
5	Ivailo Rusenov	Bulgaria	16.17	Q
6	Philips Idowu	United Kingdom	16.08	Q
7	Ambrus Szabó	Hungary	16.04	Q
8	Javier Asensio	Spain	15.97	Q
9	Sébastien Pincemail	France	15.81	Q
10	Pavel Kalinin	Russia	15.78	Q
11	Mikola Mestechkin	Ukraine	15.70	Q
12	Arnis Filet	France	15.64	Q
13	Djeke Mambo	Belgium	15.59	
14	Eduards Noreikis	Latvia	15.53	
	Andrei Mazureac	Moldova	NM	

== Participation ==
According to an unofficial count, 15 athletes from 12 countries participated in the event.

- Belgium (1)
- Bulgaria (2)
- France (3)
- Germany (1)
- Hungary (1)
- Latvia (1)
- Moldova (1)
- Romania (1)
- Russia (1)
- Spain (1)
- Ukraine (1)
- United Kingdom (1)
