= Alessandra Aguilar =

Spanish long-distance runner (born 1978)

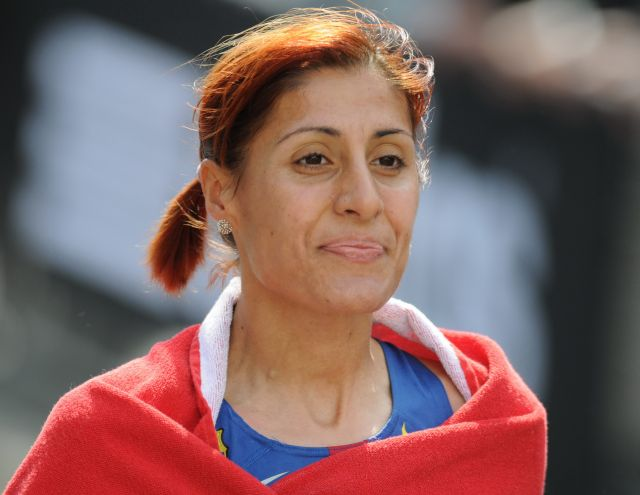
- Aguilar at the 2008 Rotterdam Marathon

Personal information
- Full name: Alessandra Aguilar Morán
- Born: 1 July 1978 (age 48) Lugo, Spain
- Height: 1.65 m (5 ft 5 in)
- Weight: 50 kg (110 lb)

Sport
- Country: Spain
- Sport: Athletics
- Event: Marathon

Alessandra Aguilar Morán (Note: In this Spanish name, the first or paternal surname is Aguilar and the second or maternal family name is Morán.) (born 1 July 1978 in Lugo) is a Spanish long-distance runner who specialises in marathon running. She represented her country in the event at the 2008 Summer Olympics and at the World Championships in Athletics the following year and then at the 2012 Summer Olympics and the World Championships following that.

Before focusing on the marathon, she competed mainly in cross country running competitions. She represented Spain at the IAAF World Cross Country Championships every year from 2000 to 2010, with the sole exception of 2007. Her best finish was twenty-fourth place at the 2009 edition. She won a team gold medal with the Spanish women at the 2007 European Cross Country Championships in Toro, Spain via a seventeenth-place finish. She also won a team bronze medal at the 2009 European Cross Country Championships.

She has a best of 32:26 minutes for the 10K distance, set at the 2007 Great Manchester Run. At the 2008 Granollers Half Marathon she took second place behind Rahab Ndungu, running a personal best time of 1:11:33 for the distance. She made her debut over the full distance at the Rotterdam Marathon that April and set a personal best of 2:29:03 to take third place. She won the Hamburg Marathon title in 2009 with a time of 2:29:01, which was enough to gain her qualification into the 2009 World Championships in Athletics. In the World Championship marathon she managed 25th place overall. She ran at the San Silvestre Vallecana race on New Year's Eve and took fifth place just behind her compatriot Marta Domínguez.

Following a win at the Venta de Baños Cross, Aguilar competed for Spain at the 2010 European Athletics Championships, which was held in Barcelona, and managed seventh in the marathon – the best Spanish finisher in the race. She set her sights on competing at the 2010 European Cross Country Championships in December and established herself as one of Spain's top contenders for the competition with a top five run at the Cross de Atapuerca and a win at the Cross Internacional Valle de Llodio. Her eighth-place finish at the European Championships was the best of the Spanish women and she led the national team to the bronze medals.

She was also selected for the 2011 IAAF World Cross Country Championships, held on home turf in Punta Umbría, but finished outside the top forty while the Spanish women ended up eighth in the team competition. She was in good form at the Rotterdam Marathon the following month and took fourth place and improved her best by two minutes, completing the distance in 2:27:00. She represented Spain in the marathon at the 2011 World Championships in Athletics, but failed to finish the race. Aguilar was suspended by the IAAF for 3 months from February 2012 to May 2012 for an unspecified doping violation committed at a Cross Country race in Cantimpalos in December 2011.

She qualified for the women's marathon at the 2012 Summer Olympics, finishing in 26th place. She went on to finish 5th at the 2013 World Athletics Championships.

== Achievements ==
Year	Competition	Venue	Position	Event	Notes
Representing Spain
1999	European U23 Championships	Göteborg, Sweden	9th	5000 m	16:03.75
2000	World Cross Country Championships	Vilamoura, Portugal	60th	8 km race	28:41
2001	World Cross Country Championships	Vilamoura, Portugal	48th	8 km race	30:59
2001	Universiade	Beijing, China	6th	10000 m	33:31.49
2002	World Cross Country Championships	Ostend, Belgium	35th	8 km race	28:43
2003	World Cross Country Championships	Lausanne, Switzerland	29th	8 km race	28:04
2004	World Cross Country Championships	Brussels, Belgium	47th	8 km race	29:52
2005	World Cross Country Championships	Saint-Galmier, France	47th	8 km race	29:39
2006	World Cross Country Championships	Fukuoka, Japan	63rd	8 km race	28:11
2008	World Cross Country Championships	Edinburgh, United Kingdom	35th	8 km race	27:13
2008	Summer Olympics	Beijing, China	54th	Marathon	2:39:29
2009	World Cross Country Championships	Amman, Jordan	24th	8 km race	28:18
2009	World Championships	Berlin, Germany	25th	Marathon	2:33:38
2010	World Cross Country Championships	Bydgoszcz, Poland	40th	8 km race	26:52
2010	European Championships	Barcelona, Spain	5th	Marathon	2:35:04
2011	World Cross Country Championships	Punta Umbría, Spain	42nd	8 km race	27:16
2011	World Championships	Daegu, South Korea	-	Marathon	DNF
2012	Summer Olympics	London, United Kingdom	26th	Marathon	2:29:19
2013	World Championships	Moscow, Russia	5th	Marathon	2:32:38
2014	World Half Marathon Championships	Copenhagen, Denmark	21st	Half marathon	1:10:56
2014	European Championships	Zürich, Switzerland	-	Marathon	DNF
2015	World Championships	Beijing, China	17th	Marathon	2:33:42
2016	World Half Marathon Championships	Cardiff, United Kingdom	-	Half marathon	DNF
2016	European Championships	Amsterdam, Netherlands	27th	Half marathon	1:13:28
2016	Summer Olympics	Rio de Janeiro, Brazil	-	Marathon	DNF
