= 2001 European Athletics U23 Championships – Men's triple jump =

The men's triple jump event at the 2001 European Athletics U23 Championships was held in Amsterdam, Netherlands, at Olympisch Stadion on 12 and 13 July.

== Medalists ==
Gold	Christian Olsson; Sweden
Silver	Igor Spasovkhodskiy; Russia
Bronze	Ionuț Pungă; Romania

== Results ==
=== Final ===
13 July

Rank	Name	Nationality	Attempts						Result	Notes
Rank	Name	Nationality	1	2	3	4	5	6	Result	Notes
1st place, gold medalist(s)	Christian Olsson	Sweden	16.62 (w: 0.1 m/s)	16.69 (w: -1.2 m/s)	16.82 (w: -1.7 m/s)	x	17.24 (w: -0.8 m/s)	x	17.24 (w: -0.8 m/s)	CR
2nd place, silver medalist(s)	Igor Spasovkhodskiy	Russia	16.64 (w: -0.6 m/s)	16.45 (w: 1.2 m/s)	16.59 (w: 0.6 m/s)	16.76 (w: -1.7 m/s)	17.08 (w: 0.2 m/s)	15.49 w (w: 2.2 m/s)	17.08 (w: 0.2 m/s)	
3rd place, bronze medalist(s)	Ionuț Pungă	Romania	x	16.81 (w: -0.2 m/s)	15.03 (w: -0.2 m/s)	16.62 (w: -0.2 m/s)	16.79 (w: 0.5 m/s)	16.54 (w: -0.6 m/s)	16.81 (w: -0.2 m/s)	
4	Konstantinos Zalagitis	Greece	x	x	16.80 (w: -0.5 m/s)	16.59 (w: 0.3 m/s)	x	16.76 (w: 0.2 m/s)	16.80 (w: -0.5 m/s)	
5	Dmitriy Valyukevich	Belarus	x	x	16.18 (w: 0.4 m/s)	15.11 (w: -0.3 m/s)	x	16.57 (w: 0.3 m/s)	16.57 (w: 0.3 m/s)	
6	Sergey Bochkov	Azerbaijan	15.62 (w: -0.9 m/s)	x	16.26 (w: 0.8 m/s)	16.09 (w: 0.2 m/s)	16.50 (w: 1.2 m/s)	x	16.50 (w: 1.2 m/s)	
7	Steven Shalders	Great Britain	15.88 (w: 1.6 m/s)	15.97 (w: -0.1 m/s)	16.28 (w: -0.7 m/s)	x	x	15.35 (w: 0.7 m/s)	16.28 (w: -0.7 m/s)	
8	Ivaylo Rusenov	Bulgaria	16.03 (w: -0.2 m/s)	x	16.10 (w: -0.1 m/s)	16.12 (w: -1.3 m/s)	14.50 (w: 0.1 m/s)	x	16.12 (w: -1.3 m/s)	
9	Sébastien Pincemail	France	15.99 (w: -2.4 m/s)	16.06 (w: -0.5 m/s)	x				16.06 (w: -0.5 m/s)	
10	Vladimir Letnicov	Moldova	x	15.88 (w: 2.0 m/s)	15.99 (w: 0.1 m/s)				15.99 (w: 0.1 m/s)	
11	Ilja Tumorin	Estonia	x	x	15.97 (w: -0.5 m/s)				15.97 (w: 1.3 m/s)	
12	Arvydas Nazarovas	Lithuania	15.50 (w: -0.5 m/s)	x	x				15.50 (w: -0.5 m/s)	

=== Qualifications ===
12 July
Qualifying 16.45 or 12 best to the Final

==== Group A ====
Rank	Name	Nationality	Result	Notes
1	Christian Olsson	Sweden	16.74 (w: 1.6 m/s)	Q
2	Igor Spasovkhodskiy	Russia	16.47 (w: 0.7 m/s)	Q
3	Sergey Bochkov	Azerbaijan	16.46 (w: 1.3 m/s)	Q
4	Dmitriy Valyukevich	Belarus	16.21 (w: 1.0 m/s)	q
5	Vladimir Letnicov	Moldova	15.99 (w: 1.7 m/s)	q
6	Ilja Tumorin	Estonia	15.92 (w: 1.1 m/s)	q
7	Mikola Savolaynen	Ukraine	15.83 (w: 0.3 m/s)	
8	Emanuele Sardano	Italy	15.82 w (w: 3.3 m/s)	
9	Andreas Pohle	Germany	15.68 (w: 1.2 m/s)	
10	Adrian Ghioroaie	Romania	15.66 (w: 0.5 m/s)	
11	Julien Kapek	France	15.54 (w: 1.2 m/s)	
	Tosin Oke	Great Britain	DNS	

==== Group B ====
Rank	Name	Nationality	Result	Notes
1	Ionuț Pungă	Romania	16.87 (w: 0.7 m/s)	Q
2	Sébastien Pincemail	France	16.20 (w: 0.9 m/s)	q
3	Konstantinos Zalagitis	Greece	16.19 (w: 1.4 m/s)	q
4	Ivaylo Rusenov	Bulgaria	16.18 (w: 0.4 m/s)	q
5	Arvydas Nazarovas	Lithuania	16.06 (w: 1.3 m/s)	q
6	Steven Shalders	Great Britain	15.88 (w: 0.7 m/s)	q
7	Andrej Batagelj	Slovenia	15.59 (w: 0.7 m/s)	
8	Rudolf Helpling	Germany	15.55 (w: 0.0 m/s)	
9	Konrad Katarzyński	Poland	15.50 (w: 0.6 m/s)	
10	Erik Nurijanyan	Armenia	15.43 (w: 0.7 m/s)	
11	Yuriy Opatskyy	Ukraine	15.01 (w: 1.4 m/s)	
	Murat Vardar	Turkey	NM	
	Michael Velter	Belgium	DNS	

== Participation ==
According to an unofficial count, 23 athletes from 19 countries participated in the event.

- Armenia (1)
- Azerbaijan (1)
- Belarus (1)
- Bulgaria (1)
- Estonia (1)
- France (2)
- Germany (2)
- Great Britain (1)
- Greece (1)
- Italy (1)
- Lithuania (1)
- Moldova (1)
- Poland (1)
- Romania (2)
- Russia (1)
- Slovenia (1)
- Sweden (1)
- Turkey (1)
- Ukraine (2)
