= Sébastien Pincemail =

French long jumper

Sébastien Pincemail (born 21 February 1979) is a French and Guadeloupean triple jumper.

== Career ==
He hails from Les Abymes, but moved to Metropolitan France in 1998. He joined the athletics club ACP Joinville, where Betty Lise became a mentor and like a "big sister" to him. In age-specific competitions, he won seven gold medals at the 1994, 1995, 1996, 1997 and 1998 CARIFTA Games, representing Guadeloupe. He thus became the most successful Guadeloupean at the CARIFTA Games. He furthermore competed at the 1996 World Junior Championships without reaching the final, finished seventh at the 1997 European Junior Championships, sixth at the 1998 World Junior Championships, ninth at the 1999 European U23 Championships and ninth at the 2001 European U23 Championships. His goal, however, had been to win the 2001 European U23 Championships and qualify for the 2001 World Championships by surpassing the 17 metre mark.

In the same year he won his first senior medal, the silver medal at the 2001 Mediterranean Games. In 2003, he competed in several international meets such as the Memorial Primo Nebiolo, the Meeting Gaz de France (national events), Gateshead Super League, the KBC Night of Athletics and Weltklasse Zürich, and received a berth in the 2003 IAAF World Athletics Final where he finished eighth. At the next Mediterranean Games edition he won the bronze medal at the 2005 Mediterranean Games, as well as finishing third at the 2005 European Cup Super League meet.

Pincemail never became French champion, but he won silver at the 2002, 2004 and 2005 French indoor championships as well as bronze in 2006. His highest achievements at the French championships were a silver medal in 2006 and bronze medal in 2004. He also competed at the 2002 European Indoor Championships and the 2004 World Indoor Championships without reaching the final.

His personal best jump was 16.95 metres, achieved in August 2003 in Heusden-Zolder. He also had 7.70 metres in the long jump, achieved in June 2007 in Sotteville-lès-Rouen.

== Personal life ==
Pincemail was interested in music, and expressed his intentions of putting out a hip hip and ragga album.
