= List of Cuban track and field athletes =

The following is a list of notable Cuban track and field athletes.

== List ==
- Alberto Juantorena, basketball, track
- Aliecer Urrutia, triple jump
- Ana Fidelia Quirot, 800 m
- Dayron Robles, Hurdling athlete
- Emeterio González, javelin thrower.
- Héctor Herrera, sprinter
- Ioamnet Quintero, high jumper
- Iván García, sprinter
- Iván Pedroso, long jump
- Javier Sotomayor, track and field record setter
- Joel Isasi, sprinter
- Joel Lamela, sprinter
- Jorge Aguilera, sprinter
- Lázaro Martínez, sprinter
- Luis Alberto Pérez-Rionda, sprinter
- Osleidys Menéndez, javelin
- Roberto Hernández
- Roberto Moya, discus throw
- Víctor Moya, high jumper
- Yargelis Savigne, jump
- Yipsi Moreno, hammer thrower
- Yoandri Betanzos, triple jump
- Yoel García, triple jumper
- Yoel Hernández, hurdler
- Yudelkis Fernández, long jumper
- Yunaika Crawford, hammer thrower
- Yuniel Hernández, hurdler
