= Ionuț Pungă =

Romanian triple jumper

Personal information
- Born: 14 October 1979 (age 47) Brăila, Romania

Sport
- Sport: Track and field
Medal record
Representing Romania
European U23 Championships
Gold medal – first place	1999 Gothenburg	Triple jump
Bronze medal – third place	2001 Amsterdam	Triple jump
World Junior Championships
Gold medal – first place	1998 Annecy	Triple jump
Bronze medal – third place	1996 Sydney	Triple jump
European Junior Championships
Silver medal – second place	1997 Ljubljana	Triple jump

Ionuţ Pungă (born 14 October 1979) is a retired Romanian triple jumper. Originally a hurdler, he holds the European age record for the age of 15 with 14.73 over 110 metres hurdles. He later switched to triple jump and won the 1998 World Junior Championships with a jump of 16.94 metres, only 10 centimetres behind the championship record set by Yoelbi Quesada in 1994. The next year Punga finished 5th at the World Indoor Championships. His personal best was 17.04 metres, which he achieved twice in June 1999.

== Achievements ==
Year	Competition	Venue	Position	Event	Notes
Representing Romania
1996	World Junior Championships	Sydney, Australia	3rd	Triple jump	16.15 m w (wind: +3.1 m/s)
1997	European Junior Championships	Ljubljana, Slovenia	2nd	Triple jump	16.43 m w (wind: +2.7 m/s)
1998	World Junior Championships	Annecy, France	1st	Triple jump	16.94 m (wind: +0.4 m/s)
1999	World Indoor Championships	Maebashi, Japan	5th	Triple jump	16.87 m
1999	European U23 Championships	Gothenburg, Sweden	13th (sf)	110m hurdles	14.00 (wind: +1.0 m/s)
1999	European U23 Championships	Gothenburg, Sweden	1st	Triple jump	16.73 m (wind: +0.9 m/s)
2000	Olympic Games	Sydney, Australia	14th (q)	Triple jump	16.72 m
2001	European U23 Championships	Amsterdam, Netherlands	3rd	Triple jump	16.81 m (wind: -0.2 m/s)

EVENT	PERFORMANCE
60 Metres Hurdles	7.75
110 Metres Hurdles	13.79
60 Metres	6.74
100 Metres	10.67
Triple jump	17.05
Long Jump	7.68
