= 1996 World Junior Championships in Athletics – Men's triple jump =

The men's triple jump event at the 1996 World Junior Championships in Athletics was held in Sydney, Australia, at International Athletic Centre on 23 and 24 August.

== Medalists ==
Gold	René Hernández; Cuba
Silver	Michael Calvo; Cuba
Bronze	Ionuț Pungă; Romania

== Results ==
=== Final ===
24 August

Rank	Name	Nationality	Attempts						Result	Notes
Rank	Name	Nationality	1	2	3	4	5	6	Result	Notes
1st place, gold medalist(s)	René Hernández	Cuba	16.29 (w: +0.7 m/s)	16.15 (w: +1.7 m/s)	15.83 (w: +1.3 m/s)	16.47 (w: +0.8 m/s)	16.14 (w: +0.3 m/s)	16.50 (w: NWI)	16.50 (w: NWI)	
2nd place, silver medalist(s)	Michael Calvo	Cuba	15.90 w (w: +2.6 m/s)	14.59 (w: +1.5 m/s)	16.16 w (w: +2.2 m/s)	16.15 (w: +0.9 m/s)	15.79 (w: +1.8 m/s)	16.47 (w: NWI)	16.47 (w: NWI)	
3rd place, bronze medalist(s)	Ionuț Pungă	Romania	15.97 w (w: +3.8 m/s)	16.45 w (w: +3.1 m/s)	15.27 (w: -0.8 m/s)	14.91 (w: +1.2 m/s)	15.59 (w: +1.4 m/s)	16.04 (w: +1.7 m/s)	16.45 w (w: +3.1 m/s)	
4	Allen Mortimer	Bahamas	x	15.96 (w: +1.3 m/s)	15.51 (w: +1.2 m/s)	14.62 (w: +1.1 m/s)	15.74 (w: +0.2 m/s)	16.44 (w: +0.2 m/s)	16.44 (w: +0.2 m/s)	
5	Colomba Fofana	France	16.09 w (w: +2.4 m/s)	x	15.86 w (w: +2.7 m/s)	x	x	15.79 (w: +0.7 m/s)	16.09 w (w: +2.4 m/s)	
6	Wang Tao	Chile	15.61 (w: +1.3 m/s)	15.87 (w: +1.8 m/s)	15.58 (w: +1.3 m/s)	15.77 (w: +1.0 m/s)	15.50 (w: +0.6 m/s)	x	15.87 (w: +1.8 m/s)	
7	Kim Hyuk	South Korea	15.74 (w: +1.6 m/s)	13.05 (w: +1.4 m/s)	15.15 (w: +0.5 m/s)	15.39 (w: 0.0 m/s)	15.50 (w: +1.2 m/s)	15.51 (w: +0.8 m/s)	15.74 (w: +1.6 m/s)	
8	Viktor Gushchinskiy	Russia	15.69 (w: +0.4 m/s)	15.56 (w: +1.5 m/s)	15.39 (w: +0.9 m/s)	15.23 (w: +0.8 m/s)	14.63 (w: +1.4 m/s)	15.23 (w: +1.5 m/s)	15.69 (w: +0.4 m/s)	
9	François-Philippe Dofén	Greece	x	15.41 (w: +1.3 m/s)	15.61 (w: -0.9 m/s)				15.61 (w: -0.9 m/s)	
10	Ionut Esanu	Romania	15.52 w (w: +2.8 m/s)	14.91 (w: +0.3 m/s)	15.45 (w: -0.6 m/s)				15.52 w (w: +2.8 m/s)	
11	Thomas Moede	Germany	15.52 (w: +1.3 m/s)	15.39 (w: +1.1 m/s)	14.95 (w: +1.4 m/s)				15.52 (w: +1.3 m/s)	
12	Djeke Mambo	Zaire	15.42 (w: 0.0 m/s)	15.48 w (w: +2.1 m/s)	15.39 (w: +0.2 m/s)				15.48 w (w: +2.1 m/s)	

=== Qualifications ===
23 Aug

==== Group A ====
Rank	Name	Nationality	Attempts			Result	Notes
Rank	Name	Nationality	1	2	3	Result	Notes
1	René Hernández	Cuba	15.80 (w: +0.5 m/s)	–	–	15.80 (w: +0.5 m/s)	Q
2	Djeke Mambo	Zaire	15.37 (w: -0.3 m/s)	15.66 (w: 0.0 m/s)	15.55 (w: -0.1 m/s)	15.66 (w: 0.0 m/s)	q
3	Thomas Moede	Germany	15.63 (w: NWI)	x	–	15.63 (w: NWI)	q
4	Allan Mortimer	Bahamas	15.13 (w: -0.3 m/s)	15.51 (w: 0.0 m/s)	15.51 (w: +1.2 m/s)	15.51 (w: 0.0 m/s)	q
5	Gable Garenamotse	Botswana				15.32	
6	Stamatios Lenis	Greece	15.29 (w: -0.7 m/s)	15.20 (w: -0.1 m/s)	14.50 (w: -0.5 m/s)	15.29 (w: -0.7 m/s)	
7	Lenton Herring	United States	14.43 (w: -0.8 m/s)	15.25 (w: -0.3 m/s)	15.07 (w: -0.7 m/s)	15.25 (w: -0.3 m/s)	
8	Hiroyuki Ochi	Japan	14.75 (w: -0.1 m/s)	14.55 (w: +0.3 m/s)	15.23 (w: +0.5 m/s)	15.23 (w: +0.5 m/s)	
9	Sébastien Pincemail	France	15.20 (w: -0.1 m/s)	15.02 (w: -0.4 m/s)	14.96 (w: 0.0 m/s)	15.20 (w: -0.1 m/s)	
10	Eduardo Pérez	Spain	15.18 (w: -0.3 m/s)	13.28 (w: -0.2 m/s)	14.28 (w: -0.1 m/s)	15.18 (w: -0.3 m/s)	
11	Lee Bu-Young	South Korea	15.05 (w: -0.2 m/s)	x	x	15.05 (w: -0.2 m/s)	
12	Diogo Cruz	Portugal	14.70 (w: -0.3 m/s)	14.89 (w: -0.1 m/s)	14.82 (w: -0.6 m/s)	14.89 (w: -0.1 m/s)	
13	Marcos da Costa	Brazil	x	14.44 (w: -1.5 m/s)	14.79 (w: +0.3 m/s)	14.79 (w: +0.3 m/s)	
14	Chi Jung-Chun	Chinese Taipei	14.77 (w: +0.6 m/s)	x	x	14.77 (w: +0.6 m/s)	
15	Karim Ould Ahmed	Algeria	13.95 (w: +0.3 m/s)	14.73 (w: -1.0 m/s)	14.56 (w: -0.2 m/s)	14.73 (w: -1.0 m/s)	
16	Ranko Leskovar	Slovenia	x	x	14.56 (w: -0.8 m/s)	14.56 (w: -0.8 m/s)	
17	David Zhishonaya	Georgia	14.07 (w: +0.1 m/s)	13.84 (w: -0.6 m/s)	14.33 (w: +0.2 m/s)	14.33 (w: +0.2 m/s)	
18	Dmitriy Semenyuk	Russia	x	13.87 (w: -0.8 m/s)	14.08 (w: -0.7 m/s)	14.08 (w: -0.7 m/s)	

==== Group B ====
Rank	Name	Nationality	Attempts			Result	Notes
Rank	Name	Nationality	1	2	3	Result	Notes
1	François-Philippe Dofén	Greece	15.42 (w: -1.0 m/s)	x	15.90 (w: -0.5 m/s)	15.90 (w: -0.5 m/s)	Q
2	Wang Tao	China	15.43 (w: -1.3 m/s)	15.82 (w: -2.2 m/s)	–	15.82 (w: -2.2 m/s)	Q
3	Colomba Fofana	France	15.77 (w: -0.5 m/s)	–	–	15.77 (w: -0.5 m/s)	Q
4	Ionuț Pungă	Romania	x	15.67 (w: +0.6 m/s)	15.47 (w: -1.0 m/s)	15.67 (w: +0.6 m/s)	q
5	Kim Hyuk	South Korea	15.63 (w: -0.5 m/s)	x	14.98 (w: -0.3 m/s)	15.63 (w: -0.5 m/s)	q
6	Viktor Gushchinskiy	Russia	13.88 (w: -1.6 m/s)	15.35 (w: -0.8 m/s)	15.57 (w: -0.2 m/s)	15.57 (w: -0.2 m/s)	q
7	Michael Calvo	Cuba	x	x	15.52 (w: -0.8 m/s)	15.52 (w: -0.8 m/s)	q
8	Ionut Esanu	Romania	15.45 (w: +1.1 m/s)	15.08 (w: -1.8 m/s)	15.17 (w: -2.1 m/s)	15.45 (w: +1.1 m/s)	q
9	Tadashi Oguri	Japan	15.30 (w: -1.3 m/s)	15.38 (w: -0.8 m/s)	15.34 (w: -1.4 m/s)	15.38 (w: -0.8 m/s)	
10	Simone Zeppo	Italy	x	14.28 (w: +0.6 m/s)	14.86 (w: -1.3 m/s)	14.86 (w: -1.3 m/s)	
11	Ambrus Szabó	Hungary	14.82 (w: +0.3 m/s)	14.55 (w: -0.5 m/s)	13.97 (w: -1.2 m/s)	14.82 (w: +0.3 m/s)	
12	Chou Chian-Chen	Chinese Taipei	13.63 (w: -1.7 m/s)	14.79 (w: -1.6 m/s)	x	14.79 (w: -1.6 m/s)	
13	Igor Rjabtsikov	Estonia	x	14.64 (w: -0.4 m/s)	14.54 (w: +0.4 m/s)	14.64 (w: -0.4 m/s)	
14	Jeferson Lopes	Brazil	x	14.11 (w: +1.2 m/s)	x	14.11 (w: +1.2 m/s)	
15	Levar Anderson	United States	x	x	14.08 (w: -1.6 m/s)	14.08 (w: -1.6 m/s)	
16	Dan Bibi	Seychelles	14.00 (w: -1.4 m/s)	x	13.97 (w: -1.6 m/s)	14.00 (w: -1.4 m/s)	

== Participation ==
According to an unofficial count, 34 athletes from 24 countries participated in the event.

- Algeria (1)
- Bahamas (1)
- Botswana (1)
- Brazil (2)
- China (1)
- Chinese Taipei (2)
- Cuba (2)
- Estonia (1)
- France (2)
- Georgia (1)
- Germany (1)
- Greece (2)
- Hungary (1)
- Italy (1)
- Japan (2)
- Portugal (1)
- Romania (2)
- Russia (2)
- Seychelles (1)
- Slovenia (1)
- South Korea (2)
- Spain (1)
- United States (2)
- Zaire (1)
