= Bouchra Ghezielle =

Medal record

Women's athletics

Representing Morocco

World Championships
Bronze medal – third place	2005 Helsinki	1500 m

African Championships
Bronze medal – third place	1998 Dakar	1500 m

Bouchra Ghézielle, née Ben Thami (Arabic: بُشرا غزال; born 19 May 1979), is a Moroccan-French track and field athlete, now competing for France. She competes mainly on the 1500 m distance but also on 800 m and 3000 m distances.

Born in Khemisset, she competed at the 2004 Olympic Games for Morocco. She won the bronze medals at the 1998 African Championships, the 1998 World Junior Championships and the 2005 World Championships, and finished fourth at the 2005 World Athletics Final.

In 2008, she was found guilty of rh-EPO doping. The sample was delivered on 9 February 2008 in an out-of-competition test in Franconville. She received a suspension from May 2008 to May 2012.

== Personal bests ==
This is a list of her personal best times:

- 800 metres - 2:00.29 min (2005)
- 1500 metres - 4:01.28 min (2005)
- 3000 metres - 8:35.41 min (2005)
- 5000 metres - 15:12.17 min (2006)
