= Dimitri Demonière =

French sprinter (born 1979)

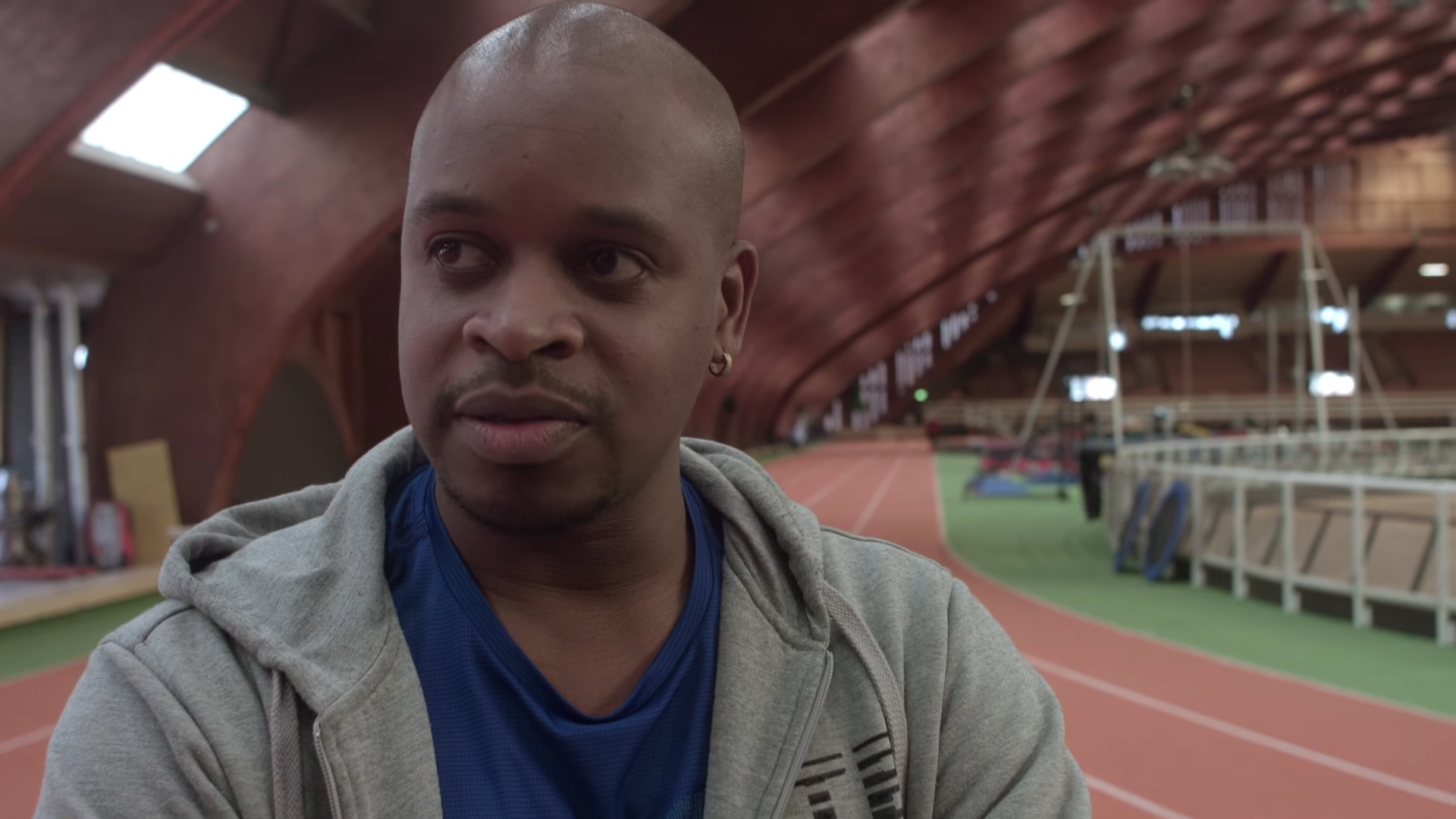
- Interview Dimitri Demonière - Entraîneur de Jimmy Vicaut

Personal information
- Nationality: French
- Born: 28 March 1979 (age 47) Fort de France, Martinique

Sport
- Sport: Running
- Event: Sprints
Medal record
Men's athletics
Representing France
European Junior Championships
Silver medal – second place	1997 Ljubljana	4×100 m relay
Representing Martinique
CARIFTA Games (Under 20)
Silver medal – second place	1998 Port of Spain	100 m
Bronze medal – third place	1997 Bridgetown	100 m
Bronze medal – third place	1998 Port of Spain	200 m

Dimitri Demonière (born 28 March 1979) is a French sprinter who specializes in the 100 metres.

At the 1998 World Junior Championships he finished fourth in the 100 metres and sixth in the 4 x 100 metres relay. He also finished seventh in relay at the 2006 World Cup. He competed individually at the 2006 European Championships without reaching the final round.

His personal best time is 10.27 seconds, achieved in July 2006 in Tomblaine.

Since October 2016, he is the trainer of Jimmy Vicaut at the INSEP.
