= Ivaylo Rusenov =

Bulgarian triple jumper

Ivaylo Rusenov (Cyrillic: Ивайло Русенов; born 9 September 1979) is a retired Bulgarian triple jumper. He was born in Pleven on 09.09 1979. Ivaylo started training at the age of 12, coached by Svetoslav Topuzov. Ivaylo was working hard, his talent in the triple jump was not unnoticed, and soon the results came. He is Balkan record holder in the triple jump with 16.53 m. He competed in the 1998 World Junior Championship, where he placed second with a result of 16.65 m. One year later during the European U23 Championship, he ended on sixth place again with great result of 16.34 m. In 2000 he was sent to represent Bulgaria in the Olympic Games in Sydney. In 2001 during the European U23 Championship in Amsterdam, he placed eighth with a result of 16.12 m.

Ivaylo moved to Plovdiv in 2002, where he was trained by Stoyko Tsonov, triple jumper and coach. Ivaylo competed in the World Championship in Paris 2003, where he placed tenth with a result of 16.66 m. and later the same year he placed fifth in the World Athletics Final in Monaco with a result of 16.70 m. In June he jumped 17.12 m. (personal best) during the European Cup in Valenje. He went to the 2004 Summer Olympic Games in Atina.

As a long jumper he has a personal best of 7.95.

In 2005 Ivaylo Rusenov started a career as a coach. Till that day he has over 250 medals from National Championships, half of those golden. 5 medals from Balkan Championships. He coached Rumen Dimitrov (triple jumper), who became Balkan champion in 2015, competed in the Olympic Games 2016 (final), finalist during both European indoor and outdoor Championships.

== Achievements ==
Year	Competition	Venue	Position	Notes
Representing Bulgaria
1998	World Junior Championships	Annecy, France	2nd	16.65 m (wind: +0.5 m/s)
1999	European U23 Championships	Gothenburg, Sweden	6th	16.34 m (wind: 1.6 m/s)
2001	European U23 Championships	Amsterdam, Netherlands	8th	16.12 m (wind: -1.3 m/s)
2003	World Championships	Paris, France	10th	16.66 m
2003	World Athletics Final	Monte Carlo, Monaco	5th	16.70 m
