= Dwight Thomas =

Jamaican sprinter

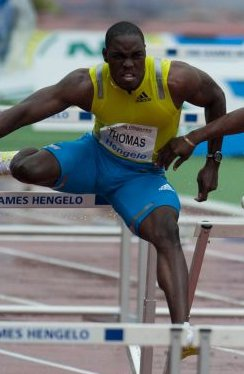
- Dwight Thomas during the 2010 FBK-Games

Personal information
- Nationality: Jamaica
- Born: 23 September 1980 (age 45)
- Height: 1.85 m (6 ft 1 in)
- Weight: 82 kg (181 lb)

Sport
- Sport: Running
- Events: 100 metres, 200 metres, 110 metres hurdles
- College team: Clemson University
- Club: Adidas Sports

Achievements and titles
- Personal bests: 100 m: 10.00 s (Linz 2005) 200 m: 20.29 s (Bydgoszcz 2007) 110 m hurdles: 13.15 s (Oslo 2011)
Medal record
Men's Athletics
Representing Jamaica
Olympic Games
Disqualified	2008 Beijing	4 × 100 m relay
World Championships
Gold medal – first place	2009 Berlin	4 × 100 m relay
Pan American Games
Bronze medal – third place	1999 Winnipeg	4 × 100 m relay
CAC Junior Championships (U20)
Gold medal – first place	1998 George Town	110 m hurdles
Gold medal – first place	1998 George Town	4x100 m relay
CAC Junior Championships (U17)
Gold medal – first place	1996 San Salvador	4x100 m relay
Silver medal – second place	1996 San Salvador	110 m hurdles
CARIFTA Games Junior (U20)
Gold medal – first place	1997 Bridgetown	4 × 100 m relay
Gold medal – first place	1998 Port of Spain	100 m
Gold medal – first place	1998 Port of Spain	100 m hurdles
Gold medal – first place	1999 Fort-de-France	100 m
Gold medal – first place	1999 Fort-de-France	200 m

Dwight Thomas O.D (born 23 September 1980) is a Jamaican sprinter, mainly competing in the 100 metres event and more recently the 110 m hurdles.

== Career ==
He won the bronze medal at the IAAF World Junior Championships in 1998 at the 100 m and gold medal in the 4 × 100 m relay, competed in the 2000 and 2004 Summer Olympics and finished 5th at the 2005 World Championships. Later in 2005 he placed third at the IAAF World Athletics Final; he was ranked #4 in the world that year by Track & Field News.

Thomas represented Jamaica at the 2008 Summer Olympics in Beijing. He competed at the 4 × 100 m relay together with Michael Frater, Nesta Carter and Asafa Powell. In their qualification heat they placed first in front of Canada, Germany and China. Their time of 38.31 was the second out of sixteen participating nations in the first round and they qualified for the final. Thomas was replaced by Usain Bolt for the final race and they sprinted to a new world record time of 37.10 seconds, claiming the gold medal. The gold medal was later vacated by the IOC in 2017 when a retest of teammate Nesta Carter found the presence of the prohibited substance methylhexaneamine.

Thomas started athletics at an early age, competing for Calabar High School. He won gold medals at the CARIFTA Games in both 1998 and 1999.

At the 1998 World Junior Championships in Annecy, France, Thomas competed for Jamaica winning a bronze medal in the 100 m, the first in his country's history in the event at the time. Three days later Jamaica won the 4 × 100 m relay.

In 1999 Thomas competed at the Junior Pan American Games in Tampa, Florida, winning the 100 m in 10.37 and the 200 m in 20.66; he was also a part of the winning 4 × 400 m relay team, running the second leg in the finals.

While Thomas attended Clemson University he was the ACC Athlete of the year winning the 60 m and the 60 m hurdles indoor, 100 m and the 200 m outdoor at the ACC Championship and an All American at the NCAA indoor Championship 2002. Thomas was the runner up at the NCAA Championship in the 100 m and the 200 m outdoor, held at LSU in Baton Rouge, to Justin Gatlin, who two years later would become the Olympic Champion in the 100 m.

Thomas transferred to the University of Florida in the fall of 2002 to continue his studies and coached by Mike Holloway, the Head Track & Field coach of the Gators. Thomas opted to go pro instead after finding out, he had to sit out his first year after arriving at Florida under a partial release from Clemson University. He would continue his studies at Florida, while being coached and mentored by Coach Holloway.

== Personal bests ==
- 100 metres – 10.00 (2005)
- 200 metres – 20.29 (2007)
- 110 metres hurdles – 13.15 (2011)

== Achievements ==
Year	Competition	Venue	Position	Event	Notes
Representing Jamaica
1996	Central American and Caribbean Junior Championships (U-17)	San Salvador, El Salvador	2nd	100 m hurdles	13.69 (2.0 m/s)
1996	Central American and Caribbean Junior Championships (U-17)	San Salvador, El Salvador	1st	4 × 100 m relay	42.39
1997	CARIFTA Games (U-20)	Bridgetown, Barbados	1st	4 × 100 m relay	39.87
1998	CARIFTA Games (U-20)	Port of Spain, Trinidad and Tobago	1st	100 m	10.46
1998	CARIFTA Games (U-20)	Port of Spain, Trinidad and Tobago	1st	110 m hurdles	14.53 (-3.0 m/s)
1998	Central American and Caribbean Junior Championships (U-20)	George Town, Cayman Islands	1st	110 m hurdles	14.40 (0.5 m/s)
1998	Central American and Caribbean Junior Championships (U-20)	George Town, Cayman Islands	1st	4 × 100 m relay	39.84
1998	World Junior Championships	Annecy, France	3rd	100 m	10.40 (1.6 m/s)
1999	CARIFTA Games (U-20)	Fort-de-France, Martinique	1st	100 m	10.47 (-0.4 m/s)
1999	CARIFTA Games (U-20)	Fort-de-France, Martinique	1st	200 m	20.79 (1.3 m/s)
2000	NACAC U-25 Championships	Monterrey, Mexico	—	100 m	DNF
2000	Olympic Games	Sydney, Australia	5th (qf)	200 m	20.58 (0.0 m/s)
2001	World Championships	Edmonton, Canada	6th (h)	4 × 100 m relay	40.05
2002	Commonwealth Games	Manchester, United Kingdom	4th	100 m	10.15 (0.2 m/s)
2002	Commonwealth Games	Manchester, United Kingdom	2nd	4 × 100 m relay	38.62
2003	World Championships	Paris, France	4th (sf)	100 m	10.19 (0.6 m/s)
2003	World Championships	Paris, France		4 × 100 m relay	DNF
2004	Olympic Games	Athens, Greece	7th (sf)	100 m	10.28 (0.2 m/s)
2004	Olympic Games	Athens, Greece	4th (h)	4 × 100 m relay	38.71 SB
2005	World Championships	Helsinki, Finland	5th	100 m	10.09 (0.4 m/s)
2007	World Championships	Osaka, Japan	2nd	4 × 100 m relay	38.02 (h) WL
2009	World Championships	Berlin, Germany	7th	110 m hurdles	13.56 (0.1 m/s)
2009	World Championships	Berlin, Germany	1st	4 × 100 m relay	38.60 (h)
2011	World Championships	Daegu, South Korea	4th (sf)	110 m hurdles	13.56 (-1.6 m/s)
