= Yin Lili =

Chinese middle-distance runner

Yin Lili (born 11 November 1979) is a female Chinese middle-distance runner.

On 18 October 1997 in Shanghai she ran the 1500 metres in 3:53.91 minutes. This ranks her sixth in the world of all time, behind Qu Yunxia, Jiang Bo, Lang Yinglai, Wang Junxia and Tatyana Kazankina.

At the 1998 World Junior Championships she won both the 3000 and the 5000 metres.

Yin never had a distinguished career after this, rarely competing internationally. In 2001, she received a two-year suspension for doping.

== See also ==
- List of sportspeople sanctioned for doping offences
