= Yimenashu Taye =

Ethiopian long-distance runner

Medal record

Women's athletics

Representing Ethiopia

African Championships
Bronze medal – third place	1998 Dakar	3000 m

Yimenashu Taye (born 1979) is an Ethiopian long-distance runner.

In 1998 she won the junior race at the World Cross Country Championships and won silver medals in the 1500 metres and 3000 metres at the World Junior Championships. At the African Championships the same year she won a bronze medal in 3000 m.

At the 2000 World Cross Country Championships she finished sixth in the short race, while the Ethiopian team of which Taye was a part won the silver medal in the team competition.
