= Casey Combest =

American sprinter

Casey Combest (born September 15, 1980) is a former American track and field sprinter who saw prominence in the late 1990s and made a comeback in 2008. Casey's story was featured in a recent ESPN Classic film, Lay It on The Line: The Casey Combest Story. He won a silver medal as part of Team USA in the 4 × 100 m relay at the World Junior Championships of 1998 held in Annecy, France, finishing 0.01 behind winners Jamaica, 39.70 & 39.71. . In 1999 he was the best high school sprinter in the nation.
