= Amar Johnson =

American football player (born 2003)

No. 35 – Los Angeles Chargers
- Position: Running back
- Roster status: Practice squad

Personal information
- Born: January 31, 2003 (age 23)
- Listed height: 5 ft 10 in (1.78 m)
- Listed weight: 205 lb (93 kg)

Career information
- High school: Chaminade College Prep (Creve Coeur, Missouri)
- College: South Dakota State (2021–2024)
- NFL draft: 2025: undrafted

Career history
- Green Bay Packers (2025)*; Los Angeles Chargers (2025–present)
- * Offseason or practice squad member only

Awards and highlights
- 2× FCS national champion (2022, 2023); 2× First-team All-MVFC (2023 (Note: Selected as an all-purpose back), 2024)

Career NFL statistics
- Rushing yards: 8
- Rushing average: 4
- Rushing touchdowns: 0
- Stats at Pro Football Reference

Amar Johnson (born January 31, 2003) is an American professional football running back for the Los Angeles Chargers of the National Football League (NFL). He played college football for the South Dakota State Jackrabbits.

== Early life ==
Amar Johnson was born on January 31, 2003. A native of O'Fallon, Missouri, he attended Chaminade College Prep in Creve Coeur, Missouri. As both a junior and senior, he was named First-team All-State after back-to-back 1,000 yard seasons. Furthermore, he was a two-time All-League selection as a kick returner and was conference offensive player of the year in 2020. He was rated as a two-star recruit by 247Sports and committed to South Dakota State over offers from Indiana State, Miami of Ohio, Missouri State, Murray State, UT Martin, and Memphis.

== College career ==
=== 2021 ===
In his freshman season, Johnson was mainly a backup running back. However, against Lindenwood, a then-NCAA Division II team, he rushed for 105 yards and his first career touchdown in the 52-7 win.

=== 2022 ===
In his sophomore season, Johnson was used as part of a duo between him and Isaiah Davis. In the National championship against North Dakota State, he helped to secure a 45-21 win with 126 rushing yards and a touchdown.

=== 2023 ===
Again as the second part of the duo with Davis, Johnson finished with 801 yards and 4 touchdowns. He was honored as a First-team All-MVFC selection as an all-purpose back. He helped contribute to the second consecutive FCS championship for the Jackrabbits.

=== 2024 ===
As Davis was drafted by the New York Jets in 2024, Johnson was left as the sole starting back for South Dakota State. He ran for 1,222 yards, 14 touchdowns, and 6.4 yards per carry. This performance led to First-team All-MVFC honors again, this time as a true running back. He finished his college career with 3,196 rushing yards and 28 touchdowns on 537 carries. He also added 518 receiving yards on 57 receptions.

== Professional career ==
Pre-draft measurables
Height	Weight	Arm length	Hand span	Wingspan	40-yard dash	10-yard split	20-yard split	20-yard shuttle	Three-cone drill	Vertical jump	Broad jump	Bench press
5 ft 9 3/4 in (1.77 m)	205 lb (93 kg)	29 1/2 in (0.75 m)	9 3/8 in (0.24 m)	6 ft 0 1/2 in (1.84 m)	4.39 s	1.51 s	2.54 s	4.28 s	7.07 s	33.5 in (0.85 m)	10 ft 4 in (3.15 m)	19 reps
All values from Pro Day

=== Green Bay Packers ===
After going undrafted in the 2025 NFL draft, Johnson signed with the Green Bay Packers, which was the team he had hoped to be drafted by. On May 2, 2025, he signed a three-year contract worth $2.98 million with the Packers. In the Packers' first preseason game against the New York Jets, Johnson led the team in rushing with 67 yards, 7 carries, and Green Bay’s only touchdown, a 39-yard rush, in the 30-10 loss. He also had the 3rd-highest grade of any NFL running back in the week.

The next week against the Indianapolis Colts, he scored another rushing touchdown along with seven carries, second on the team behind Israel Abanikanda, and one reception. He ended the preseason with 115 yards and two touchdowns on 22 carries, along with two receptions for 21 yards. Despite his performance, he was waived by the Packers on August 26.

=== Los Angeles Chargers ===
On September 2, 2025, Johnson was signed to the practice squad of the Los Angeles Chargers. On January 13, 2026, he signed a reserve/futures contract with Los Angeles.

On August 30, 2026, Johnson was waived by the Chargers as a part of final roster cuts; he was re-signed to the team's practice squad the following day.
