= 1998 World Junior Championships in Athletics =

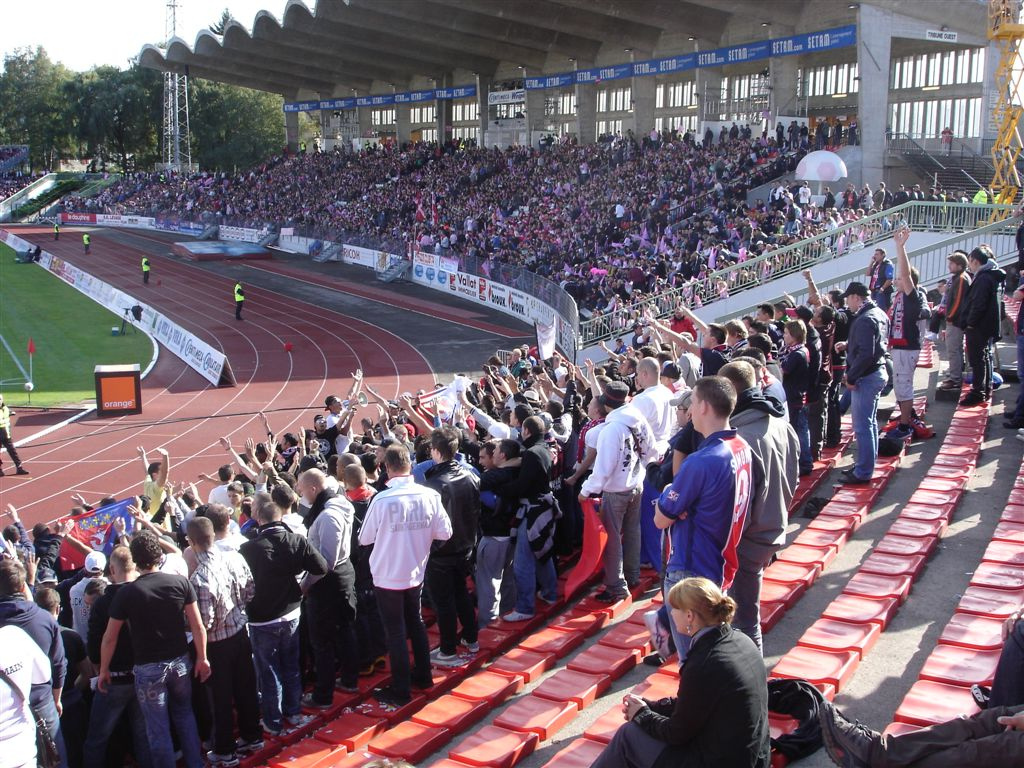
- The host stadium in Annecy (shown during a football match).
- Host city: Annecy, France
- Nations: 169
- Athletes: 1156
- Events: 43
- Dates: 28 July – 2 August
- Main venue: Parc des Sports

The 1998 World Junior Championships in Athletics is the 1998 edition of the World Junior Championships in Athletics. It was held in Annecy, France from July 28 to August 2.

== Results ==
=== Men ===
Event	Gold		Silver		Bronze	
100 metres	Christian Malcolm; Great Britain	10.12 WJL	Amar Johnson; United States	10.34 PB	Dwight Thomas; Jamaica	10.40
200 metres	Christian Malcolm; Great Britain	20.44 WJL	Jairo Duzant; Netherlands Antilles	20.92 NJR	Russell Frye; United States	20.94
400 metres	Nduka Awazie; Nigeria	45.54 PB	Casey Vincent; Australia	45.55 PB	Fawzi Al Shammari; Kuwait	45.89 NJR
800 metres	William Chirchir; Kenya	1:47.23	Wilfred Bungei; Kenya	1:47.53	Paskar Owor; Uganda	1:48.20 PB
1500 metres	Adil Kaouch; Morocco	3:42.43	Benjamin Kipkurui; Kenya	3:42.67	Robert Witt; Poland	3:43.47
5000 metres	Million Wolde; Ethiopia	13:47.49	Kipchumba Mitei; Kenya	13:49.60	Reuben Kiyara Kamzee; Kenya	13:51.22 ^{1}
10,000 metres	Benson Barus; Kenya	29:24.28	Salim Kipsang; Kenya	29:36.80	Alene Emere; Ethiopia	29:47.60
110 metres hurdles	Staņislavs Olijars; Latvia	13.51	Sharif Paxton; United States	14.10	Florian Seibold; Germany	14.21
400 metres hurdles	Periklis Iakovakis; Greece	49.82 WJL	Osiris Martínez; Cuba	50.17 PB	Peter Bate; Australia	50.83
3000 metres steeplechase	Reuben Kosgei; Kenya	8:23.76 WJL	Abraham Cherono; Kenya	8:32.24	El Moustapha Mellour; Morocco	8:34.91 PB
10,000 metres walk	Roman Rasskazov; Russia	41:55.95	Liu Yunfeng; China	42:01.11	Mario Iván Flores; Mexico	42:04.55
4 × 100 metres relay	Jamaica; Steve Slowly; Thomas Collin; Paul Thompson; Roy Bailey	39.70 WJL	United States; Casey Combest; Dashaun McCullough; Amar Johnson; Russell Frye	39.71	Germany; Tobias Unger; Stefan Holz; Zapletal Jirka; Kevin Kuske	39.99
4 × 400 metres relay	Australia; Daniel McFarlane; Daniel Batman; Aaron Russell; Casey Vincent	3:04.74 WJL	United States; Tony Berrian; Kevin Baker; Brian Swarn; Andrew Pierce	3:05.06	Jamaica; Sanjay Ayre; Leroy Colquhoun; Omar Henry; Dwayne Miller	3:05.31
High jump	Alfredo Deza; Peru	2.21	Yin Xueli; China	2.21 PB	Aleksandr Veryutin; Belarus	2.21 PB
Pole vault	Pavel Gerasimov; Russia	5.55 PB	Lars Börgeling; Germany	5.50	Paul Burgess; Australia; Adam Ptacek; Czech Republic; Giuseppe Gibilisco; Italy	5.20
Long jump	Petar Dachev; Bulgaria	8.14 NJR	Abdel Rahmane Al-Nubi; Qatar	8.11 AJR	Luis Felipe Méliz; Cuba	7.91
Triple jump	Ionut Punga; Romania	16.94 WJL	Ivaylo Russinov; Bulgaria	16.65 PB	Gregory Yeldell; United States	16.44 PB
Shot put	Mikulas Konopka; Slovakia	18.50	Janus Robberts; South Africa	18.15	Carl Myerscough; Great Britain	18.12
Discus throw	Zoltán Kővágó; Hungary	59.36	Emeka Udechuku; Great Britain	57.99	Gabor Mate; Hungary	56.96
Hammer throw	Olli-Pekka Karjalainen; Finland	72.40 CR	Yuriy Voronkin; Russia	69.66	Wojciech Kondratowicz; Poland	68.93
Javelin throw	David Parker; Great Britain	72.85	Gerhardus Pienaar; South Africa	71.16 PB	Yukifumi Murakami; Japan	70.72
Decathlon	Aki Heikkinen; Finland	7476	Thomas Poge; Germany	7332 PB	Jaakko Ojaniemi; Finland	7246 PB
WR world record | AR area record | CR championship record | GR games record | NR national record | OR Olympic record | PB personal best | SB season best | WL world leading (in a given season)

^{1} Ahmed Baday of Morocco originally won the bronze medal in 13:49.86, but he was disqualified after it was discovered he was 24 years old at the time of the Championships.

=== Women ===
Event	Gold		Silver		Bronze	
100 metres	Shakedia Jones; United States	11.19	Angela Williams; United States	11.27	Joan Uduak Ekah; Nigeria	11.50
200 metres	Muriel Hurtis; France	23.22	Shakedia Jones; United States	23.39	Sarah Wilhelmy; Great Britain	23.56
400 metres	Natalya Nazarova; Russia	52.02	Nakiya Johnson; United States	52.09 PB	Yupalis Díaz; Cuba	52.39 NJR
800 metres	Olga Mikayeva; Russia	2:05.34	Jebet Langat; Kenya	2:05.43	Naomi Misoi; Kenya	2:05.77
1500 metres	Lan Lixin; China	4:10.05	Yemenashu Taye; Ethiopia	4:11.97 PB	Bouchra Benthami; Morocco	4:12.76
3000 metres	Yin Lili; China	8:57.09 PB	Yemenashu Taye; Ethiopia	9:01.70	Edna Kiplagat; Kenya	9:05.46
5000 metres	Yin Lili; China	15:29.65 CR	Faith Jemutai; Kenya	15:34.48 PB	Meryma Hashim; Ethiopia	15:39.57 PB
100 metres hurdles	Julie Pratt; Great Britain	13.75	Sun Hong Wei; China	13.75	Susanna Kallur; Sweden	13.77
400 metres hurdles	Li Yu Lian; China	55.93	Allison Beckford; Jamaica	57.19 NJR	Sun Hong Wei; China	57.43
5000 metres walk	Sabine Zimmer; Germany	21:14.39	Jolanta Dukure; Latvia	21:17.89 NJR	Xue Ailing; China	21:28.57 PB
4 × 100 metres relay	United States; Angela Williams; Keyon Soley; Myra Combs; Shakedia Jones	43.52 WJL	France; Celine Thelamon; Muriel Hurtis; Nadia Imalouan; Anne Carole Rapp	44.07 NJR	Jamaica; Tulia Robinson; Aleen Bailey; Melaine Walker; Lisa Sharpe	44.61
4 × 400 metres relay	Jamaica; Patricia Hall; Peta-Gaye Gayle; Keasha Downer; Allison Beckford	3:32.29 WJL	Russia; Svetlana Pospelova; Olga Mikayeva; Olesya Zykina; Natalya Nazarova	3:32.35	United States; Mikele Barber; Myra Combs; Demetria Washington; Nakiya Johnson	3:32.85
High jump	Marina Kuptsova; Russia	1.88	Marie Norrman; Sweden	1.88 PB	Tatyana Efimenko; Kyrgyzstan; Nevena Lendjel; Croatia	1.84
Pole vault	Monika Gotz; Germany	4.20	María Mar Sánchez; Spain; Monika Pyrek; Poland	4.10 NJR; 4.10 NJR	None awarded	None awarded
Long jump	Peng Fengmei; China	6.59	Lu Xin; China	6.57	Maria Chiara Baccini; Italy	6.55 NJR
Triple jump	Baya Rahouli; Algeria	14.04 AJR	Maria Solomon; Romania	13.75 PB	Marija Martinovic; FR Yugoslavia	13.47
Shot put	Nadzeya Astapchuk; Belarus	18.23 WJL	Du Xianhui; China	17.69 PB	Nadine Banse; Germany	16.94
Discus throw	Liu Fengying; China	60.66	Mélina Robert-Michon; France	55.01	Lacramioara Ionescu; Romania	54.64
Hammer throw	Bianca Achilles; Germany	61.79	Sini Pöyry; Finland	61.76 NJR	Maureen Griffin; United States	60.14
Javelin throw	Osleidys Menéndez; Cuba	68.17 WJL	Liang Lili; China	61.72 PB	Wei Jianhua; China	59.10
Heptathlon	Shen Shengfei; China	5815	Susanna Rajamäki; Finland	5721	Viorica Țigău; Romania	5720 PB
WR world record | AR area record | CR championship record | GR games record | NR national record | OR Olympic record | PB personal best | SB season best | WL world leading (in a given season)

== Medal table ==
* Host nation (France)

Rank	Nation	Gold	Silver	Bronze	Total
1	China	7	6	3	16
2	Russia	5	2	0	7
3	Great Britain	4	1	2	7
4	Kenya	3	7	2	12
5	Germany	3	2	3	8
6	United States	2	7	4	13
7	Finland	2	2	1	5
8	Jamaica	2	1	3	6
9	Ethiopia	1	2	2	5
10	France*	1	2	0	3
11	Australia	1	1	2	4
11	Cuba	1	1	2	4
11	Romania	1	1	2	4
14	Bulgaria	1	1	0	2
14	Latvia	1	1	0	2
16	Morocco	1	0	3	4
17	Belarus	1	0	1	2
17	Hungary	1	0	1	2
17	Nigeria	1	0	1	2
20	Algeria	1	0	0	1
20	Greece	1	0	0	1
20	Peru	1	0	0	1
20	Slovakia	1	0	0	1
24	South Africa	0	2	0	2
25	Poland	0	1	2	3
26	Sweden	0	1	1	2
27	Netherlands Antilles	0	1	0	1
27	Qatar	0	1	0	1
27	Spain	0	1	0	1
30	Italy	0	0	2	2
31	Croatia	0	0	1	1
31	Czech Republic	0	0	1	1
31	FR Yugoslavia	0	0	1	1
31	Japan	0	0	1	1
31	Kuwait	0	0	1	1
31	Kyrgyzstan	0	0	1	1
31	Mexico	0	0	1	1
31	Uganda	0	0	1	1
Totals (38 entries)		43	44	45	132

== Participation ==
According to an unofficial count through an unofficial result list, 1156 athletes from 169 countries participated in the event. This is in agreement with the official numbers as published.

- Albania (1)
- Algeria (12)
- Anguilla (1)
- Antigua and Barbuda (1)
- Argentina (6)
- Armenia (2)
- Australia (51)
- Austria (7)
- Azerbaijan (1)
- Bahamas (5)
- Bahrain (1)
- Bangladesh (1)
- Barbados (2)
- Belarus (16)
- Belgium (8)
- Benin (1)
- Bermuda (1)
- Bhutan (1)
- Bolivia (1)
- Bosnia and Herzegovina (3)
- Botswana (2)
- Brazil (12)
- British Virgin Islands (1)
- Bulgaria (8)
- Burkina Faso (1)
- Burundi (6)
- Cambodia (1)
- Cameroon (2)
- Canada (11)
- Cape Verde (1)
- Cayman Islands (1)
- Central African Republic (1)
- Chile (2)
- China (31)
- Chinese Taipei (10)
- Colombia (4)
- Congo (1)
- Cook Islands (1)
- Costa Rica (2)
- Ivory Coast (1)
- Croatia (13)
- Cuba (11)
- Cyprus (3)
- Czech Republic (17)
- Dominica (1)
- Ecuador (4)
- Egypt (2)
- El Salvador (1)
- Equatorial Guinea (1)
- Estonia (6)
- Ethiopia (13)
- Fiji (2)
- Finland (27)
- France (63)
- Gabon (1)
- Gambia (1)
- Georgia (1)
- Germany (69)
- Ghana (1)
- Great Britain (48)
- Greece (23)
- Grenada (2)
- Guam (1)
- Guatemala (1)
- Guinea (1)
- Guyana (1)
- Haiti (1)
- Hong Kong (1)
- Hungary (17)
- Iceland (2)
- India (4)
- Ireland (7)
- Israel (2)
- Italy (31)
- Jamaica (30)
- Japan (32)
- Kazakhstan (5)
- Kenya (18)
- Kuwait (2)
- Kyrgyzstan (2)
- Laos (1)
- Latvia (6)
- Lebanon (1)
- Lesotho (2)
- Liberia (1)
- Lithuania (6)
- Luxembourg (2)
- North Macedonia (1)
- Madagascar (1)
- Malawi (1)
- Malaysia (1)
- Maldives (1)
- Mali (1)
- Malta (1)
- Mauritania (1)
- Mauritius (2)
- Mexico (6)
- Monaco (1)
- Mongolia (1)
- Morocco (16)
- Myanmar (1)
- Namibia (2)
- Netherlands (7)
- Netherlands Antilles (1)
- New Zealand (15)
- Nicaragua (1)
- Niger (1)
- Nigeria (4)
- Norfolk Island (1)
- Norway (7)
- Palestine (1)
- Panama (1)
- Papua New Guinea (1)
- Paraguay (1)
- Peru (2)
- Philippines (1)
- Poland (31)
- Portugal (13)
- Puerto Rico (1)
- Qatar (9)
- Romania (19)
- Russia (39)
- Rwanda (2)
- Saint Kitts and Nevis (1)
- Saint Lucia (1)
- Saint Vincent and the Grenadines (1)
- Samoa (1)
- San Marino (1)
- São Tomé and Príncipe (1)
- Saudi Arabia (1)
- Senegal (1)
- Seychelles (1)
- Sierra Leone (1)
- Singapore (1)
- Slovakia (7)
- Slovenia (15)
- Solomon Islands (1)
- South Africa (37)
- South Korea (10)
- Spain (30)
- Sri Lanka (1)
- Sudan (1)
- Eswatini (1)
- Sweden (19)
- Switzerland (3)
- Syria (1)
- Tajikistan (1)
- French Polynesia (1)
- Tanzania (2)
- Togo (1)
- Trinidad and Tobago (3)
- Tunisia (1)
- Turkey (5)
- Turkmenistan (2)
- Turks and Caicos Islands (1)
- Uganda (4)
- Ukraine (8)
- United Arab Emirates (1)
- United States (62)
- Uruguay (2)
- U.S. Virgin Islands (1)
- Uzbekistan (2)
- Vanuatu (1)
- Venezuela (8)
- Vietnam (1)
- Yemen (1)
- Yugoslavia (5)
- Zambia (1)
- Zimbabwe (2)
