= Aleksey Fyodorov (triple jumper) =

Russian triple jumper

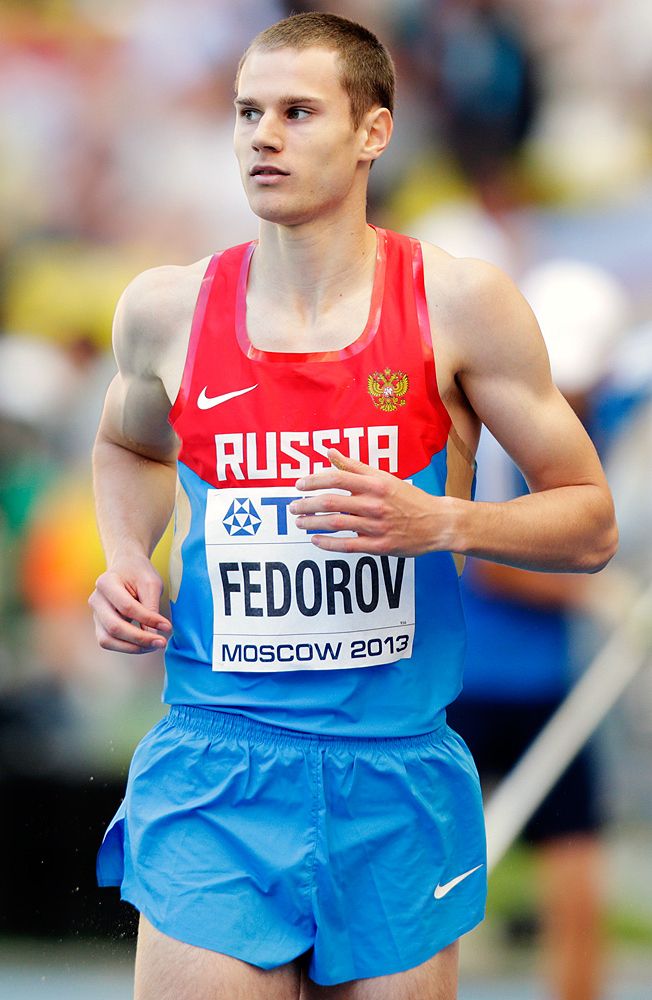
- Aleksey Fyodorov at the 2013 World Championships.

Medal record

Men's athletics

Representing Russia

European Championships
| Bronze medal – third place | 2014 Zürich | Triple jump |

European Indoor Championships
| Bronze medal – third place | 2013 Gothenburg | Triple jump |

Summer Universiade
| Silver medal – second place | 2013 Kazan | Triple jump |

Aleksey Leonidovich Fyodorov (Russian: Алексей Леонидович Фёдоров, also known as Aleksey Fedorov; born 25 May 1991) is a Russian track and field athlete who specialises in the triple jump. A former champion at world and European junior level (under-19), he was the bronze medallist at the 2013 European Athletics Indoor Championships.

He won the 2011 Russian national title and has represented his country at the World Championships in Athletics and the European Athletics Championships. His personal best for the discipline is 17.19 metres.

== Career ==
Born in Russia's Smolensk Oblast, Fyodorov had international success at a young age, taking the silver medal at the 2007 World Youth Championships in Athletics. He marked himself out as one of the world's most promising jumpers by clearing sixteen metres in 2008 before winning gold medals at the 2009 European Athletics Junior Championships and 2010 World Junior Championships in Athletics. He was Russia's first world junior champion in that event since Sergey Bykov's win in 1990.

His first clearance over seventeen metres was in June 2010 and his mark of 17.12 m was a Russian junior record. In one of the competition's strongest ever fields, the 20-year-old Fyodorov was runner-up at the 2011 European Athletics U23 Championships. The winner, Sheryf El-Sheryf, jumped 17.72 m which ranked him fourth in the world that year. Fyodorov's best that year was 17.01 m and he transitioned into the senior ranks with a win at the Russian Championships in July. This earned him a place at the 2011 World Championships in Athletics, but he failed to get beyond the qualifiers of the men's triple jump competition.

Fyodorov reached his first major final at the 2012 European Athletics Championships and finished in fourth place, beaten out of the bronze medal by a wind-assisted Aliaksei Tsapik. He was runner-up to Lyukman Adams at the national championships and had his season's best performance of 17.19 m later that month. That jump was one centimetre off the Olympic 'A' standard and meant that he missed the Russian team for the 2012 London Olympics.

Despite this set back he rebounded at the start of 2013 by taking second at the Russian indoor championships, then set an indoor best of 17.12 m in the triple jump final at the 2013 European Athletics Indoor Championships, securing third place and his first medal at the senior level.

== Achievements ==
| Year | Competition | Venue | Position | Event | Notes |
Representing Russia
| 2007 | World Youth Championships | Ostrava, Czech Republic | 2nd | Triple jump | 15.59 m |
| 2009 | European Junior Championships | Novi Sad, Serbia | 1st | Triple jump | 16.67 m |
| 2010 | World Junior Championships | Moncton, Canada | 1st | Triple jump | 16.68 m |
| 2011 | European U23 Championships | Ostrava, Czech Republic | 2nd | Triple jump | 16.85 m (+1.3 m/s) |
| 2011 | World Championships | Daegu, South Korea | 18th(q) | Triple jump | 16.42 m |
| 2012 | European Championships | Helsinki, Finland | 4th | Triple jump | 16.83 m |
| 2013 | European Indoor Championships | Gothenburg, Swedish | 3rd | Triple jump | 17.12 m |
| 2013 | European U23 Championships | Tampere, Finland | 1st | Triple jump | 17.13 m (-0.1 m/s) |
| 2013 | World Championships | Moscow, Russia | 5th | Triple jump | 16.90 m |
| 2014 | European Championships | Zürich, Switzerland | 3rd | Triple jump | 17.04 m |
| 2015 | European Indoor Championships | Prague, Czech Republic | 4th | Triple jump | 16.88 m |
| 2015 | Universiade | Gwangju, South Korea | 5th | Triple jump | 16.35 m |
| 2015 | Military World Games | Mungyeong, South Korea | 2nd | Triple jump | 16.56 m |
Competing as Authorised Neutral Athlete
| 2018 | European Championships | Berlin, Germany | 16th (q) | Triple jump | 16.29 m |
| 2019 | European Indoor Championships | Glasgow, United Kingdom | 11th (q) | Triple jump | 16.28 m |
| 2019 | World Championships | Doha, Qatar | 18th (q) | Triple jump | 16.71 m |
