= 2016 European Athletics Championships – Men's triple jump =

Men's triple jump at the European Athletics Championships
- Venue: Olympic Stadium
- Location: Amsterdam
- Dates: 7 July (qualification); 9 July (final)
- Competitors: 27 from 18 nations
- Winning mark: 17.20 m EL

Medalists
| gold medal | Max Heß | Germany |
| silver medal | Karol Hoffmann | Poland |
| bronze medal | Julian Reid | Great Britain |

The men's triple jump at the 2016 European Athletics Championships took place at the Olympic Stadium on 7 and 9 July.

== Records ==
Standing records prior to the 2016 European Athletics Championships
| World record | Jonathan Edwards (GBR) | 18.29 m | Gothenburg, Sweden | 7 August 1995 |
| European record | Jonathan Edwards (GBR) | 18.29 | Gothenburg, Sweden | 7 August 1995 |
| Championship record | Jonathan Edwards (GBR) | 17.99 | Budapest, Hungary | 23 August 1998 |
| World Leading | Christian Taylor (USA) | 17.76 | Eugene, United States | 28 May 2016 |
| European Leading | Teddy Tamgho (FRA) | 17.15 | Angers, France | 25 June 2016 |

== Schedule ==
| Date | Time | Round |
|---|---|---|
| 7 July 2016 | 11:10 | Qualification |
| 9 July 2016 | 19:45 | Final |

All times are local times (UTC+2)

== Results ==
=== Qualification ===
Qualification: 16.65 m (Q) or best 12 performances (q)

| Rank | Group | Name | Nationality | #1 | #2 | #3 | Result | Note |
|---|---|---|---|---|---|---|---|---|
| 1 | A | Karol Hoffmann | Poland | 16.11 | 16.93w | | 16.93w | Q |
| 2 | B | Max Hess | Germany | x | 16.93w | | 16.93w | Q |
| 3 | A | Şeref Osmanoğlu | Turkey | 16.34 | 16.81 | | 16.81 | Q |
| 4 | B | Maksim Niastiarenka | Belarus | 16.52 | 15.89 | 16.68 | 16.68 | Q |
| 5 | A | Georgi Tsonov | Bulgaria | 16.46w | x | 16.65w | 16.65w | Q |
| 6 | B | Julian Reid | Great Britain | 15.80 | 16.62 | 15.88w | 16.62 | q, SB |
| 7 | B | Momchil Karailiev | Bulgaria | 16.59 | x | – | 16.59 | q |
| 8 | A | Pablo Torrijos | Spain | 16.44 | 16.58 | r | 16.58 | q |
| 9 | B | Benjamin Compaoré | France | 15.65 | 16.22 | 16.53 | 16.53 | q |
| 10 | A | Dzmitry Platnitski | Belarus | 16.37 | 16.50w | 16.22w | 16.50w | q |
| 11 | A | Elvijs Misāns | Latvia | 16.50 | x | x | 16.50 | q |
| 12 | B | Fabian Florant | Netherlands | 16.36w | 16.16 | 16.45 | 16.45 | q |
| 13 | B | Zlatozar Atanasov | Bulgaria | 15.81 | 16.34 | 16.28w | 16.34 | |
| 14 | A | Harold Correa | France | 16.26w | 16.33 | 16.18 | 16.33 | |
| 15 | A | Nathan Douglas | Great Britain | 16.33 | x | 16.24 | 16.33 | |
| 16 | B | Lasha Torgvaidze | Georgia | x | 16.20 | 16.32 | 16.32 | |
| 17 | B | Nelson Évora | Portugal | 15.88 | 16.27 | 16.15 | 16.27 | |
| 18 | A | Martin Jasper | Germany | 16.27 | x | 16.05w | 16.27 | |
| 19 | B | Andriy Stanchev | Ukraine | 16.22 | 15.95w | 16.06 | 16.22 | |
| 20 | A | Levon Aghasyan | Armenia | 15.98 | 15.79 | 16.21w | 16.21w | |
| 21 | B | Aşkın Karaca | Turkey | 16.19 | x | x | 16.19 | |
| 22 | A | Dimitrios Tsiamis | Greece | 15.94 | 16.16w | 16.10 | 16.16w | |
| 23 | B | Nazim Babayev | Azerbaijan | 16.06w | x | – | 16.06w | |
| 23 | A | Artsem Bandarenka | Belarus | 16.06w | x | x | 16.06w | |
| 25 | B | Dimítrios Baltadouros | Greece | 15.99w | 15.58 | x | 15.99w | |
| 26 | A | Vladimir Letnicov | Moldova | x | 15.98 | x | 15.98 | |
| 27 | B | Marian Oprea | Romania | x | 15.40 | x | 15.40 | |

=== Final ===
| Rank | Athlete | Nationality | #1 | #2 | #3 | #4 | #5 | #6 | Result | Notes |
|---|---|---|---|---|---|---|---|---|---|---|
| 1st place, gold medalist(s) | Max Hess | Germany | x | 17.20 | – | – | x | – | 17.20 | EL |
| 2nd place, silver medalist(s) | Karol Hoffmann | Poland | 16.59 | 16.96 | 17.16 | x | 16.93 | 16.92 | 17.16 | PB |
| 3rd place, bronze medalist(s) | Julian Reid | Great Britain | 16.76 | x | 15.85 | 15.91 | x | x | 16.76 | SB |
| 4 | Momchil Karailiev | Bulgaria | 16.65 | 16.65 | x | r | | | 16.65 | |
| 5 | Maksim Niastiarenka | Belarus | 16.14 | 16.16 | 16.63 | 16.62 | 16.38 | 16.50 | 16.63 | |
| 6 | Şeref Osmanoğlu | Turkey | 16.55 | x | x | 16.53 | x | x | 16.55 | |
| 7 | Georgi Tsonov | Bulgaria | 16.05 | 15.84 | 16.53 | x | r | | 16.53 | SB |
| 8 | Pablo Torrijos | Spain | 15.88 | 16.23 | 16.34 | x | 16.33 | 16.30 | 16.34 | |
| 9 | Elvijs Misāns | Latvia | x | 16.11 | 16.32 | | | | 16.32 | |
| 10 | Fabian Florant | Netherlands | 16.12 | x | 16.23 | | | | 16.23 | |
| 11 | Dzmitry Platnitski | Belarus | 15.24 | 16.16 | 16.18 | | | | 16.18 | |
| 12 | Benjamin Compaoré | France | 16.01 | x | 16.12 | | | | 16.12 | |
