= 2013 European Athletics Indoor Championships – Men's triple jump =

The Men's triple jump event at the 2013 European Athletics Indoor Championships was held on March 1, 2013 at 11:40 (qualification) and March 2, 17:25 (final) local time.

== Records ==
Standing records prior to the 2013 European Athletics Indoor Championships
World record	Teddy Tamgho (FRA)	17.92	Paris, France	6 March 2011
European record	Teddy Tamgho (FRA)	17.92	Paris, France	6 March 2011
Championship record	Teddy Tamgho (FRA)	17.92	Paris, France	6 March 2011
World Leading	Marian Oprea (ROU)	17.17	Bucharest, Romania	25 January 2013
European Leading	Marian Oprea (ROU)	17.17	Bucharest, Romania	25 January 2013

== Results ==
=== Qualification ===
Qualification: Qualification Performance 16.90 (Q) or at least 8 best performers advanced to the final.

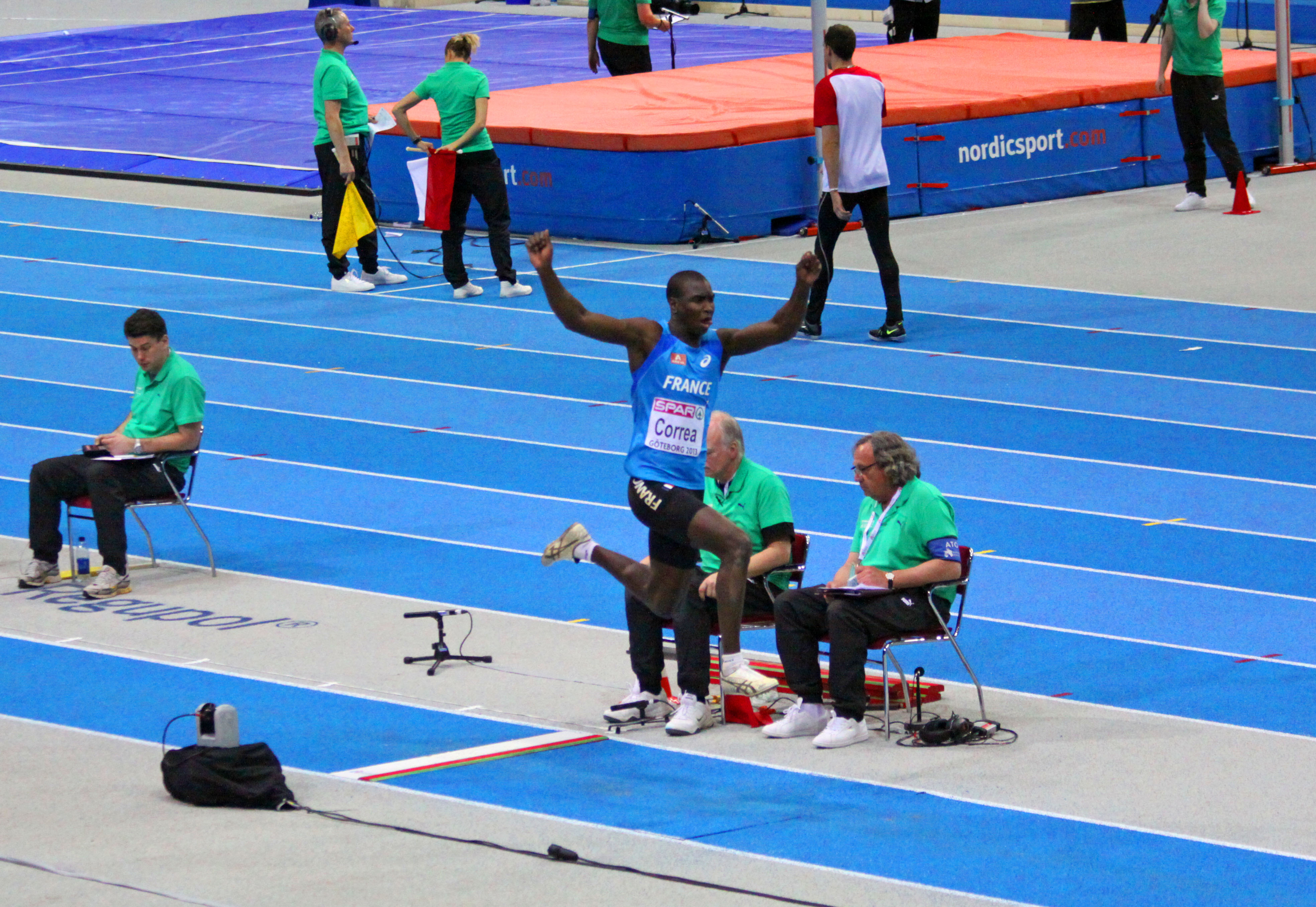
Harold Correa of France finished fifth in the final.

Rank	Athlete	Nationality	#1	#2	#3	Result	Notes
1	Daniele Greco	Italy	16.94			16.94	Q
2	Aleksey Fyodorov	Russia	16.47	16.82	—	16.82	q
3	Harold Correa	France	15.71	16.76	—	16.76	q
4	Fabian Florant	Netherlands	16.44	16.69		16.69	q
5	Viktor Kuznyetsov	Ukraine	16.68	16.35	16.43	16.68	q
6	Ruslan Samitov	Russia	16.46	16.50	16.66	16.66	q
7	Zlatozar Atanasov	Bulgaria	x	15.92	16.66	16.66	q
8	Karl Taillepierre	France	16.11	15.40	16.62	16.62	q
9	Georgi Tsonov	Bulgaria	16.35	16.31	16.58	16.58	
10	Benjamin Compaoré	France	16.14	15.97	16.48	16.48	
11	Vladimir Letnicov	Moldova	x	16.41	16.46	16.46	
12	Vicente Docavo	Spain	16.46	16.38	13.62	16.46	
13	Aliaksei Tsapik	Belarus	16.39	15.76	16.45	16.45	
14	Michele Boni	Italy	16.33	16.43	15.10	16.43	
15	Viktor Yastrebov	Ukraine	16.12	16.37	x	16.37	
16	Dimitrios Tsiamis	Greece	15.78	15.77	16.28	16.28	
17	José Emilio Bellido	Spain	16.24	x	15.72	16.24	
18	Yevhen Semenenko	Ukraine	16.10	16.09	16.20	16.20	
19	Yochai Halevi	Israel	15.60	15.70	16.19	16.19	
20	Lasha Torgvaidze	Georgia	15.35	x	x	15.35	
21	Darius Aučyna	Lithuania	15.27	15.06	15.17	15.27	
	Marian Oprea	Romania				DNS	

=== Final ===
The final was held at 17:25.

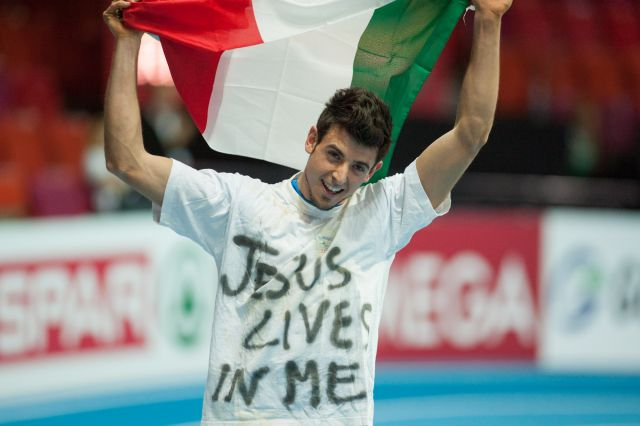
Daniele Greco, the winner of the event.

Rank	Athlete	Nationality	#1	#2	#3	#4	#5	#6	Result	Notes
1st place, gold medalist(s)	Daniele Greco	Italy	17.00	x	17.15	17.70	—	x	17.70	WL
2nd place, silver medalist(s)	Ruslan Samitov	Russia	16.51	x	16.97	x	17.30	17.03	17.30	PB
3rd place, bronze medalist(s)	Aleksey Fyodorov	Russia	x	16.93	17.12	16.78	16.83	16.72	17.12	PB
4	Viktor Kuznyetsov	Ukraine	16.64	16.87	x	16.53	17.02	16.58	17.02	PB
5	Harold Correa	France	16.64	16.78	16.92	x	16.40	16.56	16.92	
6	Karl Taillepierre	France	x	16.60	x	16.16	16.43	16.72	16.72	
7	Zlatozar Atanasov	Bulgaria	16.08	x	16.57	16.48	x	16.11	16.57	
8	Fabian Florant	Netherlands	16.55	16.52	16.44	x	x	15.70	16.55	
