= Mauro Vinícius da Silva =

Brazilian long jumper

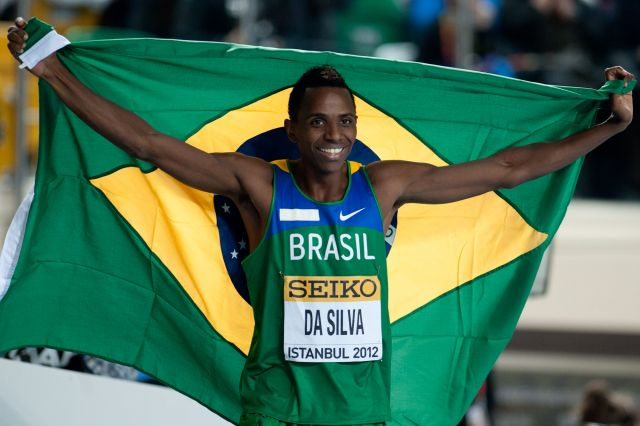
- da Silva at the 2012 World Indoor Championships.

Personal information
- Full name: Mauro Vinícius Hilário Lourenço da Silva
- Born: December 26, 1986 (age 39) Presidente Prudente, São Paulo, Brazil
- Height: 1.83 m (6 ft 0 in)
- Weight: 69 kg (152 lb)

Sport
- Country: Brazil
- Sport: Athletics
- Event: Long jump
Medal record
World Indoor Championships
Gold medal – first place	2012 Istanbul	Long jump
Gold medal – first place	2014 Sopot	Long jump
Ibero-American Championships
Bronze medal – third place	2010 San Fernando	Long jump
Bronze medal – third place	2016 Rio de Janeiro	Long jump
South American Games
Bronze medal – third place	2014 Santiago	Long jump
South American Championships
Gold medal – first place	2013 Cartagena	Long jump
Bronze medal – third place	2015 Lima	Long jump
- Updated on 5 May 2014

Mauro Vinícius Hilário Lourenço da Silva, commonly known as Duda (born 26 December 1986) is a Brazilian long jumper. He is the 2-time World Indoor champion, winning the gold medal at the 2012 IAAF World Indoor Championships in Istanbul, Turkey, and again at the 2014 IAAF World Indoor Championships at Sopot, Poland, on 8 March 2014. He competed at the 2008 Olympic Games without reaching the final, but he did make the final 8 at the 2012 Summer Olympics in London.

Da Silva jumps off his left leg. His best jump outdoors is 8.31m (27 feet 3-1/4 inches), accomplished at São Paulo, Brazil, on 7 June 2013. His best jump indoors is 8.28 metres (27' 2"), first set on 9 March 2012 during the qualifying rounds of the 14th World Indoor Championships, and matched two years later on 8 March 2014 to win the 15th World Indoor title at Sopot, Poland. Those 8.28m jumps also established a new national indoor record for a Brazilian.

Da Silva's victories at the 2012 and 2014 World Indoor Championships were both come-from-behind wins. At Istanbul, he set a world-leading mark (and national record) of 8.28m during qualifying. But in the Finals the next day, he was in seventh place after his first four jumps, with a best of only 7.77m. On his fifth jump he uncorked 8.23m to take the lead, despite taking off well behind the take-off board (nearly 20 cm behind). In the sixth (final) round, Da Silva hit the take-off board squarely and again reached 8.23m. In the sixth round, Henry Frayne of Australia was in 3rd place but he leaped 8.23m to match Da Silva exactly. The tie-breaking rule thus came into effect, with the final placings decided on the basis of each jumper's second-best marks. Da Silva won the gold medal because of his two jumps of 8.23m, while Frayne's second-best was 8.17m (from the 2nd round). Russia's Aleksandr Menkov won bronze with his 8.22m, set in the 2nd round. Two years later at Sopot, Da Silva barely qualified for the Finals, jumping a season-best 8.02 on his third and final jump, to squeak into the top 8 by one centimeter. The next day he defended his Indoor title at Sopot on 8 March 2014, again with a come-from-behind jump. He moved from 5th place to first on his sixth-and-final jump, overtaking both China’s Li Jinzhe (2nd with 8.23m) and Sweden’s Michel Torneus (3rd with 8.21m).

== Personal bests ==
=== Outdoor ===
- 100 m: 10.40 (wind: +0.4 m/s) – (Brazil) São Paulo, 20 June 2007
- 200 m: 21.02 (wind: -1.0 m/s) – (Brazil) São Paulo, 20 August 2007
- Long jump: 8.31 m (wind: +1.4 m/s) – (Brazil) São Paulo, 7 June 2013

== Achievements ==
Year	Competition	Venue	Position	Event	Notes
Representing Brazil
2006	South American Under-23 Championships / South American Games	Buenos Aires, Argentina	5th	100 m	10.63 (+0.9 m/s)
2006	South American Under-23 Championships / South American Games	Buenos Aires, Argentina	2nd	4 × 100 m relay	40.15
2008	Olympic Games	Beijing, China	26th (q)	Long jump	7.75 m
2010	Ibero-American Championships	San Fernando, Spain	3rd	Long jump	7.60 m
2012	World Indoor Championships	Istanbul, Turkey	1st	Long jump	8.23 m
2012	Olympic Games	London, United Kingdom	7th	Long jump	8.01 m
2013	South American Championships	Cartagena, Colombia	1st	Long jump	8.24 m
2013	World Championships	Moscow, Russia	5th	Long jump	8.24 m
2014	World Indoor Championships	Sopot, Poland	1st	Long jump	8.28 m
2014	South American Games	Santiago, Chile	3rd	Long jump	7.88 m
2014	Ibero-American Championships	São Paulo, Brazil	6th	Long jump	7.56 m
2015	South American Championships	Lima, Peru	3rd	Long jump	7.81 m
2016	Ibero-American Championships	Rio de Janeiro, Brazil	3rd	Long jump	7.71 m
