= Osviel Hernández =

Cuban triple jumper (born 1989)

Osviel Hernández (born 31 May 1989) is a Cuban track and field athlete who competes in the triple jump. He was the 2008 World Junior runner-up and has a personal best of 17.49 m (57 ft 4 1/2 in).

Born and raised in Matanzas Province, he began competing in athletics at the age of eleven. He cleared the sixteen-metre mark for the first time in 2007 and recorded a best of 16.40 m (53 ft 9 1/2 in) that year. The following year he was selected to represent Cuba at the 2008 World Junior Championships in Athletics. At the event in Bydgoszcz he achieved a personal best of 16.82 m (55 ft 2 in) with a wind-aided 16.90 m (55 ft 5 1/4 in) being enough for the silver medal behind France's Teddy Tamgho.

Hernández cleared seventeen metres at the Estadio Panamericano, Havana in 2009 – his jump of 17.08 m (56 ft 1/4 in) placed him within the world's top thirty that year. His 2010 and 2011 seasons were affected by injury and he did not manage a mark over seventeen metres in those years.

At the start of the 2012 season, he reached the top of the world rankings with a jump of 17.49 m (57 ft 4 1/2 in) in February. By the end of the season, this still ranked him fifth in the world. This performance did not translate to success on the track circuit, as he was beaten by compatriot Alexis Copello at both the Grande Premio Brasil Caixa de Atletismo and the IAAF Centennial meet in Havana.

After 2012, injuries again affected his performance and he was unable to jump beyond seventeen metres in either the 2013 or 2014 seasons.

== Personal bests ==
- Triple jump (outdoor) – 17.49 m (57 ft 4 1/2 in) (2012)

== International competitions ==
Year	Competition	Venue	Position	Event	Notes
2008	World Junior Championships	Bydgoszcz, Poland	2nd	Triple jump	16.90 m (wind: -2.1 m/s)
