= Yevhen Semenenko =

Ukrainian triple jumper

Yevhen Semenenko (Ukrainian: Євген Семененко, born 17 July 1984) is a Ukrainian triple jumper.

He finished twelfth at the 2006 European Championships. He also competed at the 2009 European Indoor Championships, but without reaching the final.

His personal best jump is 17.03 metres, achieved during the qualifying round at the 2006 European Championships. He equalled the mark in July 2008 in Kyiv.

== Competition record ==
Year	Competition	Venue	Position	Notes
Representing Ukraine
2003	European Junior Championships	Tampere, Finland	3rd	16.04 m
2006	European Championships	Gothenburg, Sweden	12th	16.39 m
2009	European Indoor Championships	Turin, Italy	12th (q)	16.14 m
2009	Universiade	Belgrade, Serbia	4th	16.80 m
2009	World Championships	Berlin, Germany	26th (q)	16.54 m
2011	Universiade	Shenzhen, China	4th	16.69 m
2011	World Championships	Daegu, South Korea	25th (q)	15.96 m
2013	European Indoor Championships	Gothenburg, Sweden	18th (q)	16.20 m
