= 2006 World Junior Championships in Athletics – Men's triple jump =

The men's triple jump event at the 2006 World Junior Championships in Athletics was held in Beijing, China, at Chaoyang Sports Centre on 18 and 20 August.

== Medalists ==
Gold	Benjamin Compaoré; France
Silver	Hugo Chila; Ecuador
Bronze	Zhong Minwei; China

== Results ==
=== Final ===
20 August

Rank	Name	Nationality	Attempts						Result	Notes
Rank	Name	Nationality	1	2	3	4	5	6	Result	Notes
1st place, gold medalist(s)	Benjamin Compaoré	France	15.86 (w: -0.8 m/s)	16.16 (w: -1.0 m/s)	16.61 (w: -0.5 m/s)	x	x	15.60 (w: +0.1 m/s)	16.61 (w: -0.5 m/s)	
2nd place, silver medalist(s)	Hugo Chila	Ecuador	15.78 (w: -0.4 m/s)	16.18 (w: -1.6 m/s)	16.48 (w: -0.6 m/s)	16.39 (w: 0.0 m/s)	x	16.49 (w: -0.4 m/s)	16.49 (w: -0.4 m/s)	
3rd place, bronze medalist(s)	Zhong Minwei	China	15.75 (w: -0.6 m/s)	15.33 (w: -0.1 m/s)	16.03 (w: -0.1 m/s)	x	15.64 (w: +0.2 m/s)	16.29 (w: -0.4 m/s)	16.29 (w: -0.4 m/s)	
4	Dzmitry Platnitski	Belarus	15.63 (w: -1.3 m/s)	16.09 (w: -0.5 m/s)	16.03 (w: -0.5 m/s)	x	16.16 (w: -0.3 m/s)	15.69 (w: -0.5 m/s)	16.16 (w: -0.3 m/s)	
5	Sheryf El-Sheryf	Ukraine	15.52 (w: -1.3 m/s)	16.09 (w: -0.2 m/s)	16.06 (w: -1.1 m/s)	16.04 (w: 0.0 m/s)	16.07 (w: 0.0 m/s)	16.04 (w: +0.1 m/s)	16.09 (w: -0.2 m/s)	
6	Hilton da Silva	Brazil	15.80 (w: -0.6 m/s)	15.48 (w: -0.9 m/s)	16.04 (w: -0.4 m/s)	x	16.07 (w: +0.1 m/s)	15.78 (w: 0.0 m/s)	16.07 (w: +0.1 m/s)	
7	Stanislav Ionov	Russia	15.67 (w: -1.0 m/s)	15.80 (w: -0.1 m/s)	15.92 (w: -0.2 m/s)	15.75 (w: 0.0 m/s)	16.03 (w: -0.2 m/s)	15.92 (w: -0.3 m/s)	16.03 (w: -0.2 m/s)	
8	Ilya Yefremov	Russia	15.34 (w: -0.2 m/s)	15.42 (w: -1.5 m/s)	15.93 (w: +0.1 m/s)	x	15.28 (w: +0.2 m/s)	15.72 (w: -0.2 m/s)	15.93 (w: +0.1 m/s)	
9	Zhivko Petkov	Bulgaria	14.39 (w: -1.1 m/s)	15.76 (w: -0.6 m/s)	x				15.76 (w: -0.6 m/s)	
10	Luiz da Silva	Brazil	15.28 (w: -1.3 m/s)	15.26 (w: -0.2 m/s)	15.63 (w: -0.1 m/s)				15.63 (w: -0.1 m/s)	
11	Nico Bayer	Germany	x	15.43 (w: -1.3 m/s)	x				15.43 (w: -1.3 m/s)	
12	Raman Pakhomchyk	Belarus	14.70 (w: -0.7 m/s)	14.96 (w: -0.1 m/s)	15.14 (w: +0.1 m/s)				15.14 (w: +0.1 m/s)	

=== Qualifications ===
18 August

==== Group A ====
Rank	Name	Nationality	Attempts			Result	Notes
Rank	Name	Nationality	1	2	3	Result	Notes
1	Zhivko Petkov	Bulgaria	15.37 (w: -0.3 m/s)	16.11 (w: -0.4 m/s)	-	16.11 (w: -0.4 m/s)	Q
2	Stanislav Ionov	Russia	16.05 (w: +0.3 m/s)	-	-	16.05 (w: +0.3 m/s)	Q
3	Zhong Minwei	China	16.00 (w: -0.4 m/s)	-	-	16.00 (w: -0.4 m/s)	Q
4	Hilton da Silva	Brazil	15.98 (w: +0.6 m/s)	-	-	15.98 (w: +0.6 m/s)	Q
5	Dzmitry Platnitski	Belarus	15.95 (w: +0.2 m/s)	-	-	15.95 (w: +0.2 m/s)	Q
6	Abdoulaye Diarra	France	15.65 (w: +0.2 m/s)	x	15.64 (w: 0.0 m/s)	15.65 (w: +0.2 m/s)	
7	Varunyoo Kongnil	Thailand	x	x	15.59 (w: -0.7 m/s)	15.59 (w: -0.7 m/s)	
8	Mohamed Yusuf Salman	Bahrain	15.31 (w: +0.2 m/s)	x	15.43 (w: -0.1 m/s)	15.43 (w: -0.1 m/s)	
9	Yevgeniy Chettykbayev	Kazakhstan	15.29 (w: +0.1 m/s)	x	15.13 (w: -0.7 m/s)	15.29 (w: +0.1 m/s)	
10	Séwa Sourou	Benin	15.25 (w: +0.6 m/s)	15.26 (w: -0.6 m/s)	x	15.26 (w: -0.6 m/s)	
11	Kali Jackson	United States	x	x	15.26 (w: -0.7 m/s)	15.26 (w: -0.7 m/s)	
12	Ruslan Panasenko	Azerbaijan	14.36 (w: +0.7 m/s)	x	14.47 (w: -0.7 m/s)	14.47 (w: -0.7 m/s)	

==== Group B ====
Rank	Name	Nationality	Attempts			Result	Notes
Rank	Name	Nationality	1	2	3	Result	Notes
1	Benjamin Compaoré	France	16.34 (w: +0.3 m/s)	-	-	16.34 (w: +0.3 m/s)	Q
2	Hugo Chila	Ecuador	16.01 (w: +0.1 m/s)	-	-	16.01 (w: +0.1 m/s)	Q
3	Ilya Yefremov	Russia	15.25 (w: +0.2 m/s)	15.54 (w: -0.6 m/s)	15.95 (w: +0.4 m/s)	15.95 (w: +0.4 m/s)	Q
4	Luiz da Silva	Brazil	15.90 (w: +0.3 m/s)	-	-	15.90 (w: +0.3 m/s)	Q
5	Sheryf El-Sheryf	Ukraine	15.70 (w: +0.3 m/s)	15.59 (w: -0.8 m/s)	15.87 (w: -0.2 m/s)	15.87 (w: -0.2 m/s)	Q
6	Raman Pakhomchyk	Belarus	15.29 (w: +0.3 m/s)	15.48 (w: 0.0 m/s)	15.85 (w: +0.4 m/s)	15.85 (w: +0.4 m/s)	Q
7	Nico Bayer	Germany	x	15.69 (w: 0.0 m/s)	15.40 (w: 0.0 m/s)	15.69 (w: 0.0 m/s)	q
8	Dong Bin	China	15.60 (w: +0.1 m/s)	x	14.31 (w: -0.1 m/s)	15.60 (w: +0.1 m/s)	
9	Andre Black	United States	14.68 (w: +0.6 m/s)	15.53 (w: +0.1 m/s)	x	15.53 (w: +0.1 m/s)	
10	Seif Islam Temacini	Algeria	14.64 (w: +0.3 m/s)	14.88 (w: -0.7 m/s)	14.82 (w: -0.3 m/s)	14.88 (w: -0.7 m/s)	
11	Alfonso Zandamela	Mozambique	14.78 (w: +0.4 m/s)	14.45 (w: -0.5 m/s)	14.49 (w: -0.5 m/s)	14.78 (w: +0.4 m/s)	

== Participation ==
According to an unofficial count, 23 athletes from 17 countries participated in the event.

- Algeria (1)
- Azerbaijan (1)
- Bahrain (1)
- Belarus (2)
- Benin (1)
- Brazil (2)
- Bulgaria (1)
- China (2)
- Ecuador (1)
- France (2)
- Germany (1)
- Kazakhstan (1)
- Mozambique (1)
- Russia (2)
- Thailand (1)
- Ukraine (1)
- United States (2)
