= Zlatozar Atanasov =

Bulgarian triple jumper

Zlatozar Atanasov (Bulgarian: Златозар Атанасов; born 12 December 1989) is a Bulgarian athlete specialising in the triple jump. He represented his country at the 2013 World Championships without qualifying for the final. In addition, he finished eleventh at the 2012 European Championships and seventh at the 2013 European Indoor Championships.

His personal bests in the event are 17.09 metres outdoors (+1.3 m/s, Burgas 2013) and 16.70 metres indoors (Dobrich 2013).

== Competition record ==
Year	Competition	Venue	Position	Event	Notes
Representing Bulgaria
2009	European U23 Championships	Kaunas, Lithuania	8th	Triple jump	16.32 m
2011	European U23 Championships	Ostrava, Czech Republic	6th	Triple jump	16.39 m
2012	European Championships	Helsinki, Finland	11th	Triple jump	16.39 m
2013	European Indoor Championships	Gothenburg, Sweden	7th	Triple jump	16.57 m
2013	European Indoor Championships	Moscow, Russia	19th (q)	Triple jump	16.21 m
2014	European Championships	Zürich, Switzerland	15th (q)	Triple jump	16.32 m
2015	European Indoor Championships	Prague, Czech Republic	14th (q)	Triple jump	16.05 m
2016	European Championships	Amsterdam, Netherlands	13th (q)	Triple jump	16.34 m
2017	European Indoor Championships	Belgrade, Serbia	17th (q)	Triple jump	15.96 m
