= Harold Correa =

French triple jumper (born 1988)

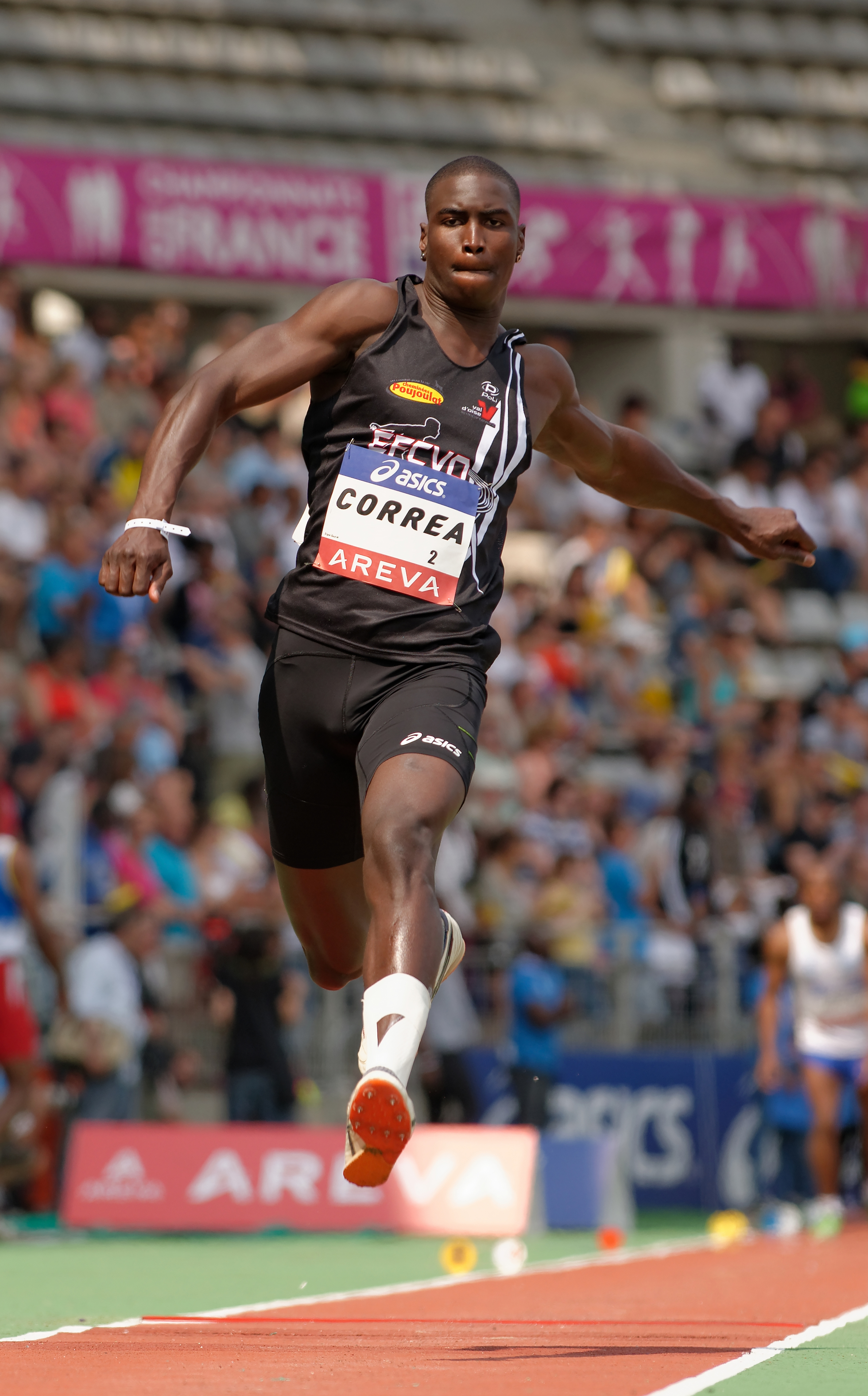
- Correa at the 2013 French Championships

Personal information
- Born: 13 July 1996 (age 30) Épinay-sur-Seine, France
- Height: 190 cm (6 ft 3 in)
- Weight: 82 kg (181 lb)

Sport
- Sport: Athletics
- Event: Triple jump
- Club: Entente Franconville Césame Val d'Oise

Harold Correa (born 26 June 1988 in Épinay-sur-Seine) is a French athlete specialising in the triple jump. He represented his country at the 2016 World Indoor Championships finishing ninth.

His personal bests in the event are 16.92 metres outdoors (0.0 m/s, Villeneuve-d'Ascq 2013) and 16.94 metres indoors (Aubière 2013).

== Competition record ==
Year	Competition	Venue	Position	Notes
Representing France
2013	European Indoor Championships	Gothenburg, Sweden	5th	16.92 m
2016	World Indoor Championships	Portland, United States	9th	16.30 m
2016	European Championships	Amsterdam, Netherlands	14th (q)	16.33 m
2016	Olympic Games	Rio de Janeiro, Brazil	13th (q)	16.60 m
2018	European Championships	Berlin, Germany	11th	16.33 m
