= 2009 European Athletics U23 Championships – Men's triple jump =

The men's triple jump event at the 2009 European Athletics U23 Championships was held in Kaunas, Lithuania, at S. Dariaus ir S. Girėno stadionas (Darius and Girėnas Stadium) on 18 and 19 July.

== Medalists ==
Gold	Daniele Greco; Italy
Silver	Zhivko Petkov; Bulgaria
Bronze	Aliaksandr Liabedzka; Belarus

== Results ==
=== Final ===
19 July

Rank	Name	Nationality	Attempts						Result	Notes
Rank	Name	Nationality	1	2	3	4	5	6	Result	Notes
1st place, gold medalist(s)	Daniele Greco	Italy	x	16.24 (w: 1.3 m/s)	16.46 (w: 0.7 m/s)	16.35 (w: 0.8 m/s)	x	17.20 (w: 1.8 m/s)	17.20 (w: 1.8 m/s)	
2nd place, silver medalist(s)	Zhivko Petkov	Bulgaria	16.27 (w: -1.5 m/s)	16.67 w (w: 2.2 m/s)	16.67 (w: 1.0 m/s)	16.55 (w: 0.4 m/s)	16.68 (w: 1.0 m/s)	16.81 w (w: 2.7 m/s)	16.81 w (w: 2.7 m/s)	
3rd place, bronze medalist(s)	Aliaksandr Liabedzka	Belarus	15.79 (w: 0.1 m/s)	16.80 (w: 1.0 m/s)	16.08 (w: 0.8 m/s)	x	x	16.09 (w: 0.8 m/s)	16.80 (w: 1.0 m/s)	
4	Raman Pakhomchyk	Belarus	15.19 (w: 0.5 m/s)	16.20 (w: 0.6 m/s)	16.44 (w: 0.7 m/s)	16.56 (w: 0.2 m/s)	x	16.54 (w: 0.5 m/s)	16.56 (w: 0.2 m/s)	
5	Pavel Shalin	Russia	16.29 (w: 0.2 m/s)	16.56 (w: 0.3 m/s)	–	x	15.43 (w: 1.8 m/s)	15.76 (w: -0.3 m/s)	16.56 (w: 0.3 m/s)	
6	Dzmitry Platnitski	Belarus	16.41 (w: 1.6 m/s)	16.02 (w: 1.1 m/s)	16.23 (w: 1.2 m/s)	15.87 (w: 0.7 m/s)	16.50 (w: 1.0 m/s)	16.53 (w: -0.4 m/s)	16.53 (w: -0.4 m/s)	
7	Abdoulaye Diarra	France	16.17 (w: 0.5 m/s)	16.46 (w: 1.6 m/s)	15.91 (w: 0.0 m/s)	16.03 (w: 0.8 m/s)	16.25 (w: 1.2 m/s)	x	16.46 (w: 1.6 m/s)	
8	Zlatozar Atanasov	Bulgaria	16.02 (w: -0.6 m/s)	16.22 (w: 0.8 m/s)	16.32 (w: 0.5 m/s)	x	x	x	16.32 (w: 0.5 m/s)	
9	Yoann Rapinier	France	16.14 (w: 0.7 m/s)	16.23 (w: 0.9 m/s)	15.70 (w: 0.1 m/s)				16.23 (w: 0.9 m/s)	
10	Adrian Dăianu	Romania	16.09 (w: 1.9 m/s)	16.09 (w: 0.8 m/s)	15.92 (w: 0.9 m/s)				16.09 (w: 1.9 m/s)	
11	José Emilio Bellido	Spain	16.08 (w: 0.9 m/s)	x	x				16.08 (w: 0.9 m/s)	
12	Marcos Caldeira	Portugal	15.46 (w: 0.7 m/s)	14.98 (w: 1.3 m/s)	x				15.46 (w: 0.7 m/s)	

=== Qualifications ===
18 July
Qualifying 16.20 or 12 best to the Final

==== Group A ====
Rank	Name	Nationality	Result	Notes
1	Daniele Greco	Italy	16.60 (w: -1.2 m/s)	Q
2	Aliaksandr Liabedzka	Belarus	16.50 (w: 1.7 m/s)	Q
3	Zhivko Petkov	Bulgaria	16.41 (w: 1.3 m/s)	Q
4	Adrian Dăianu	Romania	16.36 w (w: 2.8 m/s)	Q
5	Abdoulaye Diarra	France	16.30 w (w: 2.6 m/s)	Q
6	Marcos Caldeira	Portugal	16.19 (w: 1.5 m/s)	q
7	José Palomanes	Spain	15.70 (w: 0.9 m/s)	
8	Elvijs Misāns	Latvia	15.56 (w: -1.0 m/s)	
9	Vytas Raugas	Lithuania	14.66 (w: -2.4 m/s)	

==== Group B ====
Rank	Name	Nationality	Result	Notes
1	Raman Pakhomchyk	Belarus	16.45 (w: 0.1 m/s)	Q
2	Pavel Shalin	Russia	16.28 (w: 1.1 m/s)	Q
3	Yoann Rapinier	France	16.23 (w: -0.3 m/s)	Q
4	Dzmitry Platnitski	Belarus	15.88 (w: 1.3 m/s)	q
5	Zlatozar Atanasov	Bulgaria	15.88 (w: 1.0 m/s)	q
6	José Emilio Bellido	Spain	15.78 (w: 1.0 m/s)	q
7	Michał Lewandowski	Poland	15.63 (w: 0.6 m/s)	
8	Peder Pawel Nielsen	Denmark	15.51 w (w: 2.1 m/s)	
9	Haşim Yılmaz	Turkey	15.01 (w: -0.1 m/s)	

== Participation ==
According to an unofficial count, 18 athletes from 13 countries participated in the event.

- Belarus (3)
- Bulgaria (2)
- Denmark (1)
- France (2)
- Italy (1)
- Latvia (1)
- Lithuania (1)
- Poland (1)
- Portugal (1)
- Romania (1)
- Russia (1)
- Spain (2)
- Turkey (1)
