= Karol Hoffmann =

Polish triple jumper (born 1989)

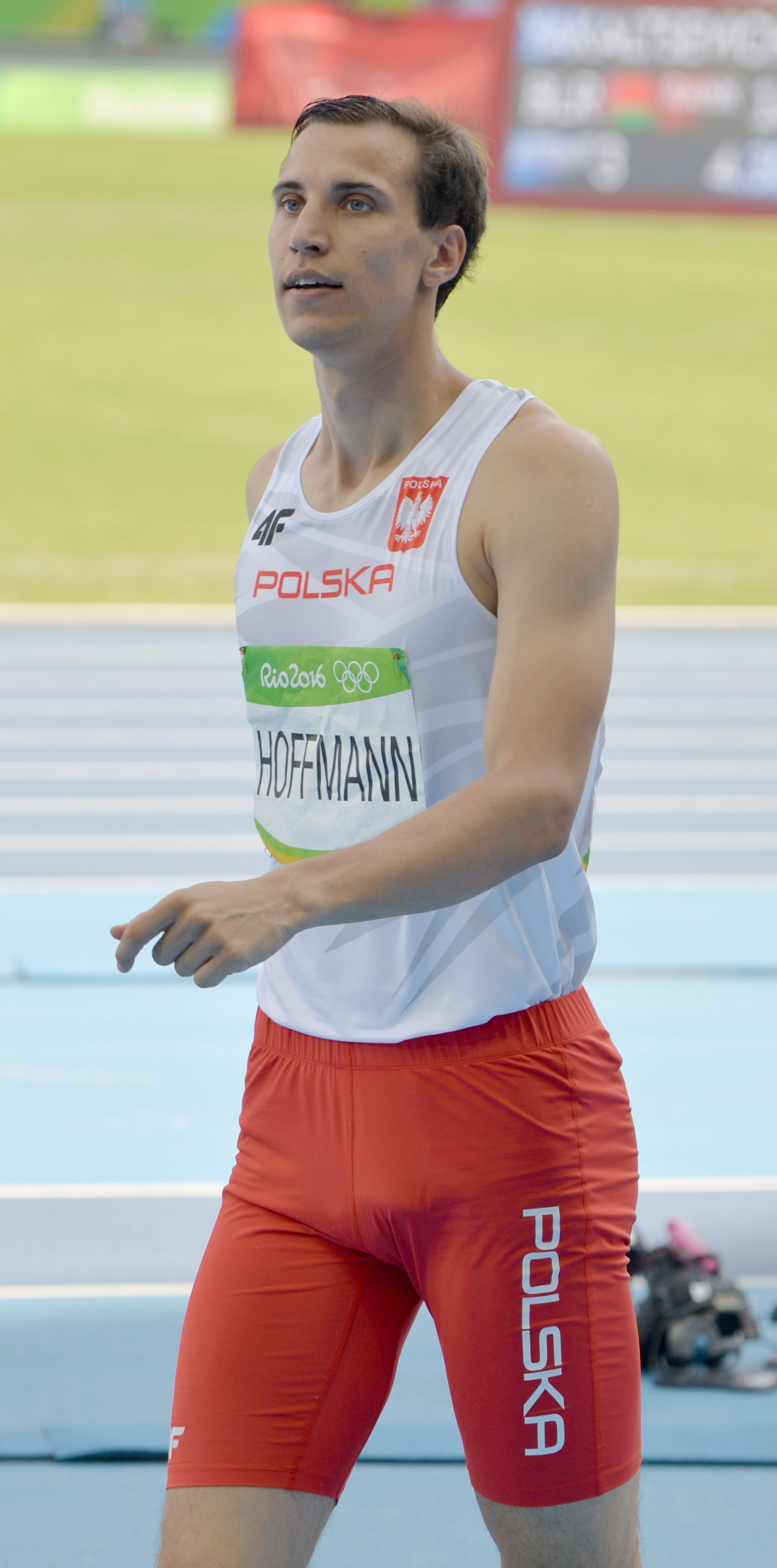
- Hoffmann at the 2016 Olympics

Personal information
- Born: 1 June 1989 (age 37) Warsaw, Poland
- Education: University of Łódź
- Height: 196 cm (6 ft 5 in)
- Weight: 84 kg (185 lb)

Sport
- Sport: Athletics
- Event(s): Triple jump, long jump
- Club: MKS Aleksandrów Łódzki
- Coached by: Leszek Lipinski

Achievements and titles
- Personal best(s): TJ – 17.16 m (2016); LJ – 7.31 m (2006)
Medal record
Representing Poland
European Championships
Silver medal – second place	2016 Amsterdam	Triple jump

Karol Hoffmann (born 1 June 1989) is a Polish triple jumper. He won a silver medal at the 2016 European Athletics Championships and placed 12th at the 2016 Olympics.

Hoffmann's father Zdzisław won the 1983 world title in the triple jump and still holds the Polish national record. Karol has a tattoo of that record on his leg.

== Competition record ==
Year	Competition	Venue	Position	Notes
Representing Poland
2007	European Junior Championships	Hengelo, Netherlands	22nd (q)	15.00 m
2008	World Junior Championships	Bydgoszcz, Poland	10th	15.42 m (−0.7 m/s)
2011	European U23 Championships	Ostrava, Czech Republic	10th	16.21 m
2012	European Championships	Helsinki, Finland	6th	16.74 m
2014	World Indoor Championships	Sopot, Poland	5th	16.89 m
2016	European Championships	Amsterdam, Netherlands	2nd	17.16 m
2016	Olympic Games	Rio de Janeiro, Brazil	12th	16.31 m
2018	Athletics World Cup	London, United Kingdom	1st	16.74 m
2018	European Championships	Berlin, Germany	–	NM
