= Dong Bin =

Chinese triple jumper (born 1988)

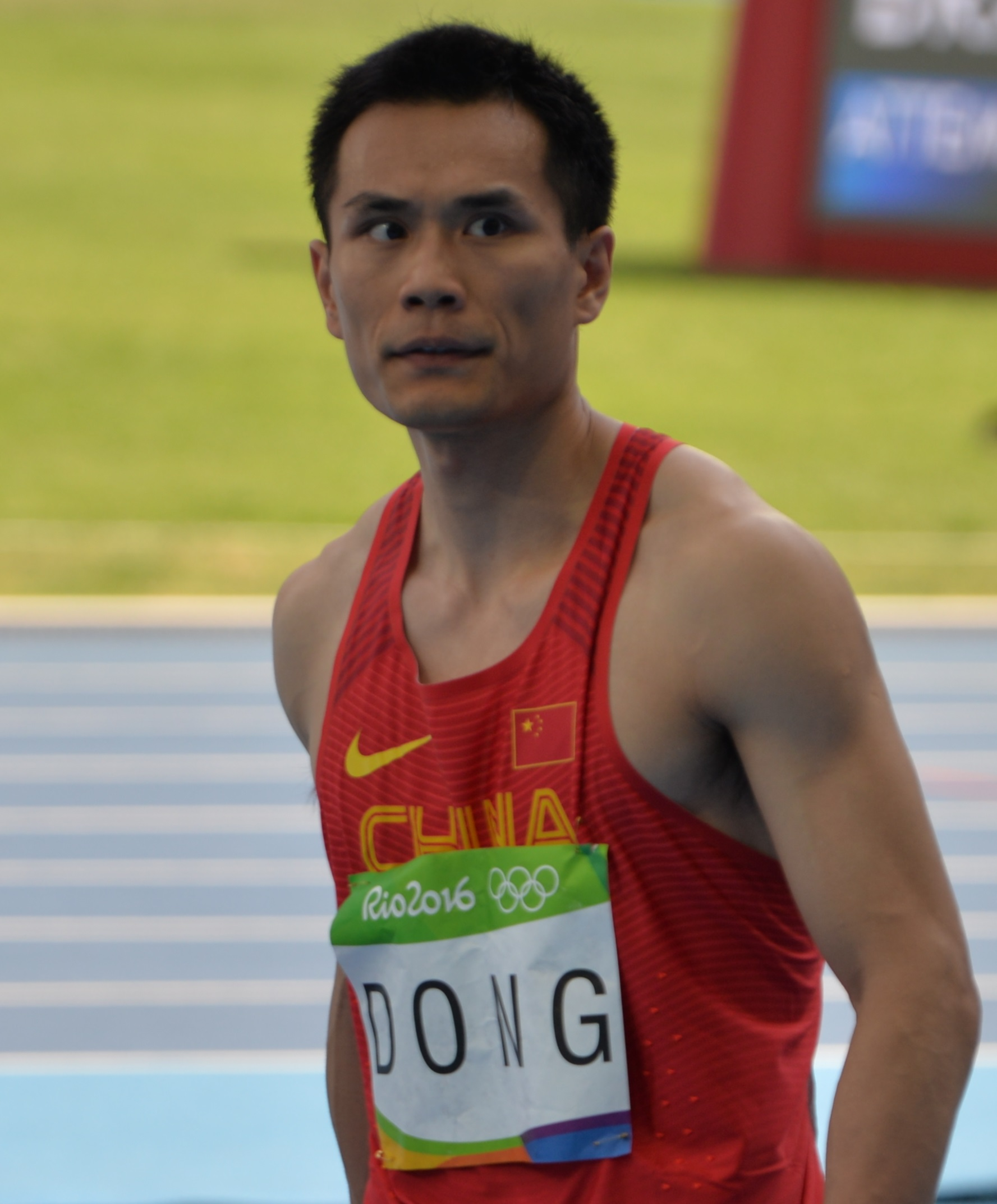
- Dong Bin at the 2016 Olympics

Personal information
- Born: November 22, 1988 (age 37)
- Height: 1.80 m (5 ft 11 in)
- Weight: 72 kg (159 lb)

Sport
- Country: China
- Sport: Athletics
- Event: Triple jump
Medal record
Men's athletics
Representing China
Olympic Games
| Bronze medal – third place | 2016 Rio de Janeiro | Triple jump |
World Indoor Championships
| Gold medal – first place | 2016 Portland | Triple jump |
Asian Indoor Championships
| Gold medal – first place | 2010 Tehran | Triple jump |
| Gold medal – first place | 2012 Hangzhou | Triple jump |

Dong Bin (Chinese: 董斌; born 22 November 1988) is a Chinese track and field athlete who specialises in the triple jump. He is a two-time gold medallist at the Asian Indoor Athletics Championships and has a personal best of 17.58 metres, which he set winning the bronze medal at the 2016 Olympics. In 2016 he won the World Indoor Championship.

His indoor best of 17.33 m is an Asian and Chinese indoor record. He also represented China at the 2012 Olympics, came fifth at the 2011 Asian Athletics Championships and was a finalist at the Summer Universiade in both 2009 and 2011.

== Career ==
Born in Changsha, he first represented China internationally at the 2006 World Junior Championships in Athletics held in Beijing, where he finished eighth in his qualifying group. He made progress into the senior ranks in 2008, when finished as runner-up at the Chinese Athletics Championships with a personal best of 16.54 m. In the 2009 indoor season, he improved this to 16.89 m on the Chinese Athletics Grand Prix circuit. He represented his province (Hunan) at the 2009 National Games of China and came sixth.

His first major success in the senior ranks came at the 2010 Asian Indoor Athletics Championships, where his jump of 16.73 m was a championship record and brought him the gold medal. He set an outdoor personal best of 16.86 m that year and placed third at the national championships. He broke the Chinese indoor record in February 2011, clearing 17.01 m and matched his outdoor best in April. Dong and Li Yanxi were the Chinese entrants at that year's 2011 Asian Athletics Championships, but while Li took the silver Dong only managed fifth place with 16.36 m. Just over a week later he jumped 17.05 m, albeit wind-aided (+2.1 m/s).

He defended his title at the 2012 Asian Indoor Athletics Championships with a championship and national record of 17.01 m, although he narrowly saw off Chinese rival Cao Shuo, who jumped the same distance but had a shorter second-best jump. In his first appearance on the global senior stage he finished eighth at the 2012 IAAF World Indoor Championships. Outdoors, a big improvement to 17.38 m in April earned him a place at the London Olympics and he reached tenth in the Olympic triple jump final – the best performance by an Asian athlete.

In Nanjing in March 2013 he broke Oleg Sakirkin's 20-year-old Asian indoor record with a jump of 17.16 m. That year, he also reached the final of the World Championship.

His performance at the 2015 World Championships was less good, failing to make the final at a home World Championships.

He began 2016 well, setting a new area and national record indoor in February at the Chinese National Indoor Grand Prix, before going on winning the World Indoor Championship in March. He then set a new outdoor personal best on the way to winning the bronze medal at the 2016 Summer Olympics.

== Personal bests ==
- Long jump: 7.09 metres (2007)
- Triple jump (outdoor): 17.58 metres (2016)
- Triple jump (indoor): 17.41 metres (2016) AR

== Competition record ==
| Year | Competition | Venue | Position | Notes |
Representing China
| 2006 | World Junior Championships | Beijing, China | 14th (q) | 15.60 m (+0.1 m/s) |
| 2009 | Universiade | Belgrade, Serbia | 11th | 16.26 m |
| 2010 | Asian Indoor Championships | Tehran, Iran | 1st | 16.73 m |
| 2011 | Asian Championships | Kobe, Japan | 5th | 16.36 m |
| 2011 | Universiade | Shenzhen, China | 8th | 16.32 m |
| 2012 | Asian Indoor Championships | Hangzhou, China | 1st | 17.01 m (=iNR) |
| 2012 | World Indoor Championships | Istanbul, Turkey | 8th | 16.75 m |
| 2012 | Olympic Games | London, United Kingdom | 10th | 16.75 m |
| 2013 | World Championships | Moscow, Russia | 9th | 16.73 m |
| 2014 | Asian Games | Incheon, South Korea | 2nd | 16.95 m |
| 2015 | Asian Championships | Wuhan, China | 4th | 16.65 m |
| 2015 | World Championships | Beijing, China | 18th (q) | 16.44 m |
| 2016 | World Indoor Championships | Portland, United States | 1st | 17.33 m |
| 2016 | Olympic Games | Rio de Janeiro, Brazil | 3rd | 17.58 m |
| 2018 | World Indoor Championships | Birmingham, United Kingdom | 8th | 16.84 m |
