= 2011 European Athletics U23 Championships – Men's triple jump =

The Men's triple jump event at the 2011 European Athletics U23 Championships was held in Ostrava, Czech Republic, at Městský stadion on 16 and 17 July.

== Medalists ==
Gold	Sheryf El-Sheryf; Ukraine
Silver	Aleksey Fyodorov; Russia
Bronze	Yuriy Kovalyov; Russia

== Results ==
=== Final ===
17 July 2011 / 17:05

Rank	Name	Nationality	Attempts						Result	Notes
Rank	Name	Nationality	1	2	3	4	5	6	Result	Notes
1st place, gold medalist(s)	Sheryf El-Sheryf	Ukraine	16.99 (w: +1.2 m/s)	17.04 (w: +1.7 m/s)	16.88 (w: +1.0 m/s)	x (w: +0.7 m/s)	x (w: +0.3 m/s)	17.72 (w: +1.3 m/s)	17.72 (w: +1.3 m/s)	CR
2nd place, silver medalist(s)	Aleksey Fyodorov	Russia	x (w: +1.7 m/s)	16.32 (w: +1.1 m/s)	16.53 (w: +0.8 m/s)	16.34 (w: +1.9 m/s)	16.85 (w: +1.3 m/s)	16.66 (w: +0.6 m/s)	16.85 (w: +1.3 m/s)	
3rd place, bronze medalist(s)	Yuriy Kovalyov	Russia	16.40 (w: +0.6 m/s)	x (w: +2.1 m/s)	16.63 (w: +1.2 m/s)	x (w: +0.5 m/s)	16.82 w (w: +2.3 m/s)	x (w: +1.5 m/s)	16.82 w (w: +2.3 m/s)	
4	Daniele Greco	Italy	x (w: +1.2 m/s)	16.55 w (w: +2.3 m/s)	x (w: +1.9 m/s)	x (w: +1.5 m/s)	-	-	16.55 w (w: +2.3 m/s)	
5	Alexandru George Baciu	Romania	16.44 (w: +1.6 m/s)	x (w: +1.7 m/s)	x (w: +1.0 m/s)	16.14 (w: +1.3 m/s)	x (w: +0.5 m/s)	16.17 (w: +1.6 m/s)	16.44 (w: +1.6 m/s)	PB
6	Zlatozar Atanasov	Bulgaria	x (w: +1.0 m/s)	16.39 (w: +1.6 m/s)	16.17 (w: +0.7 m/s)	16.38 (w: +1.9 m/s)	x (w: +1.3 m/s)	-	16.39 (w: +1.6 m/s)	PB
7	Yevgeniy Zhukov	Russia	15.70 w (w: +2.2 m/s)	x (w: +3.1 m/s)	16.31 (w: +1.8 m/s)	16.12 w (w: +2.1 m/s)	x (w: +1.0 m/s)	15.83 (w: +0.9 m/s)	16.31 (w: +1.8 m/s)	
8	Darius Aučyna	Lithuania	16.25 w (w: +2.9 m/s)	-	16.23 (w: +2.0 m/s)	-	15.76 (w: +0.8 m/s)	16.08 (w: +1.4 m/s)	16.25 w (w: +2.9 m/s)	PB
9	Igor Syunin	Estonia	16.25 (w: +1.2 m/s)	16.03 (w: +1.9 m/s)	x (w: +1.2 m/s)				16.25 (w: +1.2 m/s)	
10	Karol Hoffmann	Poland	16.21 (w: +1.4 m/s)	x (w: +1.8 m/s)	16.20 (w: +0.5 m/s)				16.21 (w: +1.4 m/s)	
11	Panayiotis Volou	Cyprus	15.49 (w: +0.9 m/s)	x (w: +0.9 m/s)	15.11 (w: +0.8 m/s)				15.49 (w: +0.9 m/s)	
12	Norbert Lenard	Romania	14.71 (w: -0.2 m/s)	15.29 (w: +0.7 m/s)	x (w: +0.9 m/s)				15.29 (w: +0.7 m/s)	

=== Qualifications ===
Qualified: qualifying perf. 16.20 (Q) or 12 best performers (q) to the advance to the Final

==== Summary ====
Rank	Name	Nationality	Result	Notes
1	Sheryf El-Sheryf	Ukraine	16.45	Q
2	Aleksey Fyodorov	Russia	16.43	Q
3	Igor Syunin	Estonia	16.32	Q
4	Yuriy Kovalyov	Russia	16.30	Q
5	Daniele Greco	Italy	16.24	Q
6	Karol Hoffmann	Poland	16.21	Q
7	Alexandru George Baciu	Romania	16.13	q SB
8	Zlatozar Atanasov	Bulgaria	16.02	q
9	Yevgeniy Zhukov	Russia	15.99	q
10	Panayiotis Volou	Cyprus	15.78	q
11	Darius Aučyna	Lithuania	15.75	q SB
12	Norbert Lenard	Romania	15.55	q
13	Anton Balan	Moldova	15.35	
14	José Palomanes	Spain	15.28	
15	Carlos Veiga	Portugal	14.71	
	Aboubacar Bamba	France	NM	
	Yoann Rapinier	France	NM	
	Teddy Tamgho	France	NM	
	Jorge Gimeno	Spain	DNS	

==== Details ====
===== Group A =====
16 July 2011 / 12:05

Rank	Name	Nationality	Attempts			Result	Notes
Rank	Name	Nationality	1	2	3	Result	Notes
1	Aleksey Fyodorov	Russia	x (w: +1.2 m/s)	16.43 (w: +1.3 m/s)		16.43 (w: +1.3 m/s)	Q
2	Yuriy Kovalyov	Russia	16.30 (w: +1.3 m/s)			16.30 (w: +1.3 m/s)	Q
3	Daniele Greco	Italy	16.24 (w: +0.1 m/s)			16.24 (w: +0.1 m/s)	Q
4	Karol Hoffmann	Poland	16.21 (w: +0.9 m/s)			16.21 (w: +0.9 m/s)	Q
5	Alexandru George Baciu	Romania	15.92 (w: -0.2 m/s)	16.13 (w: +0.9 m/s)	15.74 (w: 0.0 m/s)	16.13 (w: +0.9 m/s)	q SB
6	Panayiotis Volou	Cyprus	15.22 (w: 0.0 m/s)	15.78 (w: +1.4 m/s)	15.77 (w: +0.6 m/s)	15.78 (w: +1.4 m/s)	q
7	Darius Aučyna	Lithuania	15.48 (w: +0.7 m/s)	x (w: +1.0 m/s)	15.75 (w: +1.2 m/s)	15.75 (w: +1.2 m/s)	q SB
8	Anton Balan	Moldova	x (w: +0.4 m/s)	15.35 (w: +0.5 m/s)	15.23 (w: +0.3 m/s)	15.35 (w: +0.5 m/s)	
	Yoann Rapinier	France	x (w: +0.9 m/s)	x (w: +0.8 m/s)	x (w: +0.7 m/s)	NM	
	Jorge Gimeno	Spain				DNS	

===== Group B =====
16 July 2011 / 12:05

Rank	Name	Nationality	Attempts			Result	Notes
Rank	Name	Nationality	1	2	3	Result	Notes
1	Sheryf El-Sheryf	Ukraine	16.45 (w: -0.1 m/s)			16.45 (w: -0.1 m/s)	Q
2	Igor Syunin	Estonia	15.85 (w: +1.9 m/s)	13.37 (w: +0.5 m/s)	16.32 (w: +0.9 m/s)	16.32 (w: +0.9 m/s)	Q
3	Zlatozar Atanasov	Bulgaria	16.02 (w: 0.0 m/s)	x (w: +1.1 m/s)	x (w: +0.9 m/s)	16.02 (w: 0.0 m/s)	q
4	Yevgeniy Zhukov	Russia	14.41 (w: +1.3 m/s)	15.85 (w: +1.4 m/s)	15.99 (w: +0.2 m/s)	15.99 (w: +0.2 m/s)	q
5	Norbert Lenard	Romania	x (w: -0.2 m/s)	x (w: +0.8 m/s)	15.55 (w: +1.0 m/s)	15.55 (w: +1.0 m/s)	q
6	José Palomanes	Spain	x (w: +0.2 m/s)	x (w: +0.2 m/s)	15.28 (w: +0.7 m/s)	15.28 (w: +0.7 m/s)	
7	Carlos Veiga	Portugal	14.71 (w: +0.6 m/s)	x (w: +0.5 m/s)	x (w: +0.4 m/s)	14.71 (w: +0.6 m/s)	
	Aboubacar Bamba	France	x (w: +0.1 m/s)	x (w: +0.5 m/s)	x (w: +0.9 m/s)	NM	
	Teddy Tamgho	France	-	-	-	NM	

== Participation ==
According to an unofficial count, 18 athletes from 13 countries participated in the event.

- Bulgaria (1)
- Cyprus (1)
- Estonia (1)
- France (3)
- Italy (1)
- Lithuania (1)
- Moldova (1)
- Poland (1)
- Portugal (1)
- Romania (2)
- Russia (3)
- Spain (1)
- Ukraine (1)
