= 2012 IAAF World Indoor Championships – Men's long jump =

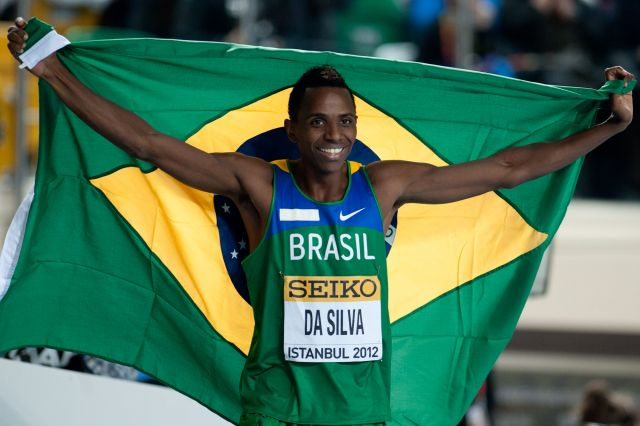
Mauro Vinícius da Silva celebrating his win.

The men's long jump at the 2012 IAAF World Indoor Championships was held on 9–10 March 2012 at the Ataköy Athletics Arena.

Participants tied for first place with jumps of 8.23 metres, so their second-best jumps were used to break the tie, with the second-best jumps differing by 6 cm. This was the first time such a tiebreaker had been used in the men's long jump at these championships. It would happen again twelve years later at the 2024 championships.

== Medalists ==
Gold	Silver	Bronze
Mauro Vinícius da Silva; Brazil	Henry Frayne; Australia	Aleksandr Menkov; Russia

== Records ==
Standing records prior to the 2012 IAAF World Indoor Championships
World record	Carl Lewis (USA)	8.79	New York City, United States	27 January 1984
Championship record	Iván Pedroso (CUB)	8.62	Maebashi, Japan	7 March 1999
World Leading	Aleksandr Menkov (RUS)	8.24	Moscow, Russia	5 February 2012
World Leading	Will Claye (USA)	8.24	Fayetteville, United States	10 February 2012
African record	Ignisious Gaisah (GHA)	8.36	Stockholm, Sweden	2 February 2006
Asian record	Su Xiongfeng (CHN)	8.27	Nanjing, China	11 March 2010
European record	Sebastian Bayer (GER)	8.71	Turin, Italy	8 March 2009
North and Central American and Caribbean record	Carl Lewis (USA)	8.79	New York City, United States	27 January 1984
Oceanian Record	Fabrice Lapierre (AUS)	8.19	Doha, Qatar	12 March 2010
South American record	Irving Saladino (PAN)	8.42	Paiania, Greece	13 February 2008

== Qualification standards ==
Indoor
8.15

== Schedule ==
Date	Time	Round
March 9, 2012	18:20	Qualification
March 10, 2012	18:50	Final

== Results ==
=== Qualification ===
Qualification standard 8.00 m (Q) or at least best 8 qualified. 15 athletes from 14 countries participated. The qualification round started at 18:22 and ended at 19:09.

Rank	Athlete	Nationality	#1	#2	#3	Result	Notes
1	Mauro Vinícius da Silva	Brazil	7.93	x	8.28	8.28	Q, WL, NR
2	Luis Felipe Méliz	Spain	8.10			8.10	Q, SB
3	Henry Frayne	Australia	7.77	8.02		8.02	Q
4	Louis Tsatoumas	Greece	8.00			8.00	Q
5	Aleksandr Menkov	Russia	7.80	7.98	–	7.98	q
6	Ndiss Kaba Badji	Senegal	7.88	7.93	x	7.93	q
7	Will Claye	United States	x	7.91	–	7.91	q
8	Ignisious Gaisah	Ghana	7.77	7.79	7.89	7.89	q
9	Michel Tornéus	Sweden	x	7.77	7.85	7.85	
10	Tyrone Smith	Bermuda	7.76	x	7.80	7.80	
11	Eusebio Cáceres	Spain	7.37	7.71	7.67	7.71	
12	Alexandru Cuharenko	Moldova	7.42	7.44	7.66	7.66	
13	Supanara Sukhasvasti	Thailand	7.14	7.43	x	7.43	
14	Alper Kulaksız	Turkey	7.42	7.15	x	7.42	SB
15	Su Xiongfeng	China	x	7.42	–	7.42	SB

=== Final ===
8 athletes from 8 countries participated. The final started at 18:53 and ended at 20:02.

Rank	Athlete	Nationality	#1	#2	#3	#4	#5	#6	Result	Notes
1st place, gold medalist(s)	Mauro Vinícius da Silva	Brazil	7.73	x	x	7.77	8.23	8.23	8.23	
2nd place, silver medalist(s)	Henry Frayne	Australia	8.17	x	x	x	7.89	8.23	8.23	AR
3rd place, bronze medalist(s)	Aleksandr Menkov	Russia	8.12	8.22	x	x	8.10	x	8.22	
4	Will Claye	United States	7.78	x	7.98	x	8.04	x	8.04	
5	Ndiss Kaba Badji	Senegal	7.93	x	x	7.97	x	x	7.97	SB
6	Louis Tsatoumas	Greece	7.88	x	x	x	7.49	7.77	7.88	
7	Ignisious Gaisah	Ghana	7.76	7.70	7.83	7.75	7.86	7.85	7.86	
8	Luis Felipe Méliz	Spain	x	x	x	x	x	7.50	7.50	
