= 2012 European Athletics Championships – Men's triple jump =

2012 athletic event in Helsinki

Men's triple jump at the European Athletics Championships

The men's triple jump at the 2012 European Athletics Championships was held at the Helsinki Olympic Stadium on 28 and 30 June.

== Medalists ==
| Gold | Fabrizio Donato; Italy |
| Silver | Sheryf El-Sheryf; Ukraine |
| Bronze | Aliaksei Tsapik; Belarus |

== Records ==
Standing records prior to the 2012 European Athletics Championships
| World record | Jonathan Edwards (GBR) | 18.29 | Gothenburg, Sweden | 7 August 1995 |
| European record | Jonathan Edwards (GBR) | 18.29 | Gothenburg, Sweden | 7 August 1995 |
| Championship record | Jonathan Edwards (GBR) | 17.99 | Budapest, Hungary | 23 August 1998 |
| World Leading | Christian Taylor (USA) | 17.62 | Eugene, United States | 1 June 2012 |
| European Leading | Lyukman Adams (RUS) | 17.53 | Sochi, Russia | 27 May 2012 |

== Schedule ==
| Date | Time | Round |
|---|---|---|
| 28 June 2012 | 12:20 | Qualification |
| 30 June 2012 | 19:05 | Final |

== Results ==
=== Qualification ===
Qualification: Qualification Performance 16.75 (Q) or at least 12 best performers advance to the final

| Rank | Group | Athlete | Nationality | #1 | #2 | #3 | Result | Notes |
|---|---|---|---|---|---|---|---|---|
| 1 | A | Fabrizio Donato | Italy | 17.17 | | | 17.17 | Q |
| 2 | B | Karol Hoffmann | Poland | 17.09 | | | 17.09 | Q, PB |
| 3 | B | Aliaksei Tsapik | Belarus | x | 16.95 | | 16.95 | Q |
| 4 | A | Sheryf El-Sheryf | Ukraine | 16.91 | | | 16.91 | Q |
| 5 | B | Momchil Karailiev | Bulgaria | 16.73 | 16.50 | – | 16.73 | q |
| 6 | A | Yochai Halevi | Israel | 16.67 | 16.13 | 16.53 | 16.67 | q |
| 7 | B | Fabrizio Schembri | Italy | 16.49 | 16.58 | 16.29 | 16.58 | q |
| 8 | B | Zlatozar Atanasov | Bulgaria | x | 15.98 | 16.58 | 16.58 | q |
| 9 | B | Andreas Pohle | Germany | x | 14.15 | 16.54 | 16.54 | q |
| 10 | A | Dimitrios Tsiamis | Greece | 16.55 | 15.75 | x | 16.55 | q |
| 11 | A | Dzmitry Platnitski | Belarus | 15.70 | 16.47 | x | 16.47 | q |
| 12 | B | Aleksey Fyodorov | Russia | 14.93 | x | 16.43 | 16.43 | q |
| 13 | B | Fabian Florant | Netherlands | x | x | 16.35 | 16.35 | SB |
| 14 | B | Aleksi Tammentie | Finland | 16.23 | 16.32 | 16.15 | 16.32 | PB |
| 15 | A | Larry Achike | Great Britain | 15.77 | 16.25 | 16.13 | 16.25 | |
| 16 | A | Lisvany Pérez | Spain | 15.79 | 16.24 | 16.12 | 16.24 | |
| 17 | A | Zacharias Arnos | Cyprus | 16.23 | 16.02 | 16.02 | 16.23 | |
| 18 | A | Karl Taillepierre | France | 15.10 | 15.55 | 16.20 | 16.20 | |
| 19 | A | Marian Oprea | Romania | 16.17 | x | x | 16.17 | |
| 20 | B | Igor Sjunin | Estonia | 16.12 | x | 16.24 | 16.24 | |
| 21 | A | Anders Møller | Denmark | 15.98 | 13.23 | 15.60 | 15.98 | SB |
| 22 | B | Marcos Caldeira | Portugal | 15.95 | x | x | 15.95 | |
| 23 | B | Daniele Greco | Italy | 15.90 | x | x | 15.90 | |
| 24 | A | Ruslan Samitov | Russia | 15.40 | 15.86 | 16.32 | 16.32 | |
| 25 | A | Rumen Dimitrov | Bulgaria | x | 15.12 | 15.60 | 15.60 | |
| 26 | B | Vicente Docavo | Spain | x | x | 14.28 | 14.28 | |
| | A | Mantas Dilys | Lithuania | x | x | x | NM | |

=== Final ===
| Rank | Athlete | Nationality | #1 | #2 | #3 | #4 | #5 | #6 | Result | Notes |
|---|---|---|---|---|---|---|---|---|---|---|
| 1st place, gold medalist(s) | Fabrizio Donato | Italy | 17.63w | 17.53 | 17.49 | 17.17 | – | 16.08 | 17.63w | =EL |
| 2nd place, silver medalist(s) | Sheryf El-Sheryf | Ukraine | 17.28w | 16.99 | 16.94 | 16.57 | – | – | 17.28w | |
| 3rd place, bronze medalist(s) | Aliaksei Tsapik | Belarus | 16.18 | 16.97w | x | 15.38 | 16.65 | 16.83w | 16.97w | |
| 4 | Aleksey Fyodorov | Russia | x | 16.83 | x | 16.72 | 16.68 | 16.79 | 16.83 | SB |
| 5 | Momchil Karailiev | Bulgaria | x | 16.77 | 16.68w | 16.61 | x | x | 16.77 | |
| 6 | Karol Hoffmann | Poland | 16.74 | 16.06 | x | 16.71w | x | 16.47 | 16.74 | |
| 7 | Dzmitry Platnitski | Belarus | x | x | 16.56w | x | 16.68 | 16.50 | 16.68 | |
| 8 | Yochai Halevi | Israel | 16.24 | 16.25 | 16.62 | 16.19 | 16.62 | 16.67 | 16.67 | |
| 9 | Dimitrios Tsiamis | Greece | 16.52 | 16.19w | 16.44 | | | | 16.52 | |
| 10 | Fabrizio Schembri | Italy | 16.34 | x | 16.40w | | | | 16.40w | |
| 11 | Zlatozar Atanasov | Bulgaria | 15.74 | 16.03 | 16.39 | | | | 16.39 | |
| 12 | Andreas Pohle | Germany | x | x | 16.34 | | | | 16.34 | |

- Note: w = wind-assisted
