= 2008 World Junior Championships in Athletics – Men's triple jump =

The men's triple jump event at the 2008 World Junior Championships in Athletics was held in Bydgoszcz, Poland, at Zawisza Stadium on 10 and 11 July.

== Medalists ==
Gold	Teddy Tamgho; France
Silver	Osviel Hernández; Cuba
Bronze	Mohamed Yusuf Salman; Bahrain

== Results ==
=== Final ===
11 July

Rank	Name	Nationality	Attempts						Result	Notes
Rank	Name	Nationality	1	2	3	4	5	6	Result	Notes
1st place, gold medalist(s)	Teddy Tamgho	France	17.03 (w: -2.7 m/s)	16.66 (w: -0.6 m/s)	16.90 (w: -0.7 m/s)	17.33 (w: -2.1 m/s)	17.19 (w: -2.3 m/s)	14.46 (w: -0.7 m/s)	17.33 (w: -2.1 m/s)	
2nd place, silver medalist(s)	Osviel Hernández	Cuba	16.52 (w: -0.6 m/s)	15.74 (w: -0.4 m/s)	16.07 (w: -1.4 m/s)	16.90 (w: -2.1 m/s)	16.82 (w: -1.0 m/s)	16.52 (w: -0.5 m/s)	16.90 (w: -2.1 m/s)	
3rd place, bronze medalist(s)	Mohamed Yusuf Salman	Bahrain	16.15 (w: -0.6 m/s)	16.59 (w: -1.0 m/s)	16.45 (w: -0.9 m/s)	x	16.43 (w: -3.1 m/s)	14.67 (w: -0.8 m/s)	16.59 (w: -1.0 m/s)	
4	Daniele Greco	Italy	x	16.14 (w: -1.0 m/s)	x	13.46 (w: -0.6 m/s)	x	16.33 (w: -1.2 m/s)	16.33 (w: -1.2 m/s)	
5	Henry Frayne	Australia	x	15.96 (w: -0.6 m/s)	16.22 (w: -1.6 m/s)	16.29 (w: -0.8 m/s)	x	16.04 (w: -0.5 m/s)	16.29 (w: -0.8 m/s)	
6	Austin Davis	United States	15.75 (w: -1.6 m/s)	15.70 (w: -0.8 m/s)	x	15.58 (w: -1.1 m/s)	x	15.78 (w: -1.3 m/s)	15.78 (w: -1.3 m/s)	
7	José Alfonso Palomanes	Spain	15.31 (w: -0.7 m/s)	x	15.54 (w: -1.1 m/s)	x	15.63 (w: -1.5 m/s)	13.12 (w: -1.3 m/s)	15.63 (w: -1.5 m/s)	
8	Christian Taylor	United States	x	15.61 (w: -0.7 m/s)	x	14.90 (w: -1.1 m/s)	15.51 (w: -1.3 m/s)	15.58 (w: -0.7 m/s)	15.61 (w: -0.7 m/s)	
9	Sheryf El-Sheryf	Ukraine	15.43 (w: -1.3 m/s)	15.43 (w: -0.8 m/s)	x				15.43 (w: -1.3 m/s)	
10	Karol Hoffmann	Poland	x	x	15.42 (w: -0.7 m/s)				15.42 (w: -0.7 m/s)	
11	Olexandr Ryzhykov	Ukraine	x	15.39 (w: -0.6 m/s)	x				15.39 (w: -0.6 m/s)	
12	Yu Jae-Hyuk	South Korea	x	15.36 (w: -0.7 m/s)	13.70 (w: -2.5 m/s)				15.36 (w: -0.7 m/s)	

=== Qualifications ===
10 July

==== Group A ====
Rank	Name	Nationality	Attempts			Result	Notes
Rank	Name	Nationality	1	2	3	Result	Notes
1	Henry Frayne	Australia	x	16.40 (w: 0.0 m/s)	-	16.40 (w: 0.0 m/s)	Q
2	Teddy Tamgho	France	16.30 (w: -0.8 m/s)	-	-	16.30 (w: -0.8 m/s)	Q
3	Daniele Greco	Italy	15.44 (w: -0.4 m/s)	15.79 (w: -1.0 m/s)	x	15.79 (w: -1.0 m/s)	q
4	Sheryf El-Sheryf	Ukraine	15.67 (w: -1.2 m/s)	15.56 (w: -0.5 m/s)	15.57 (w: 0.0 m/s)	15.67 (w: -1.2 m/s)	q
5	Christian Taylor	United States	15.24 (w: -0.2 m/s)	x	15.67 (w: -0.2 m/s)	15.67 (w: -0.2 m/s)	q
6	José Alfonso Palomanes	Spain	x	15.14 (w: -0.2 m/s)	15.58 (w: -0.2 m/s)	15.58 (w: -0.2 m/s)	q
7	Radu Muscalu	Romania	x	x	15.48 (w: -0.6 m/s)	15.48 (w: -0.6 m/s)	
8	Óscar Salazar	Mexico	15.38 (w: -0.2 m/s)	x	15.42 (w: -0.6 m/s)	15.42 (w: -0.6 m/s)	
9	Boipelo Motlhatlhego	South Africa	13.52 (w: -1.2 m/s)	x	15.32 (w: -0.1 m/s)	15.32 (w: -0.1 m/s)	
10	Eddy Florián	Dominican Republic	14.77 (w: -1.6 m/s)	15.29 (w: -0.6 m/s)	15.21 (w: -0.8 m/s)	15.29 (w: -0.6 m/s)	
11	Mubarak Al-Jaseer	Saudi Arabia	15.27 (w: -1.7 m/s)	15.10 (w: -0.3 m/s)	13.58 (w: -0.5 m/s)	15.27 (w: -1.7 m/s)	
12	Wojciech Delimata	Poland	x	15.06 (w: -0.5 m/s)	x	15.06 (w: -0.5 m/s)	
	Stefan Tseng Ke Chen	Singapore	x	x	x	NM	

==== Group B ====
Rank	Name	Nationality	Attempts			Result	Notes
Rank	Name	Nationality	1	2	3	Result	Notes
1	Osviel Hernández	Cuba	16.30 (w: -0.7 m/s)	-	-	16.30 (w: -0.7 m/s)	Q
2	Karol Hoffmann	Poland	15.94 (w: -2.0 m/s)	-	-	15.94 (w: -2.0 m/s)	Q
3	Olexandr Ryzhykov	Ukraine	15.75 (w: -1.3 m/s)	13.55 (w: -0.4 m/s)	15.46 (w: -0.5 m/s)	15.75 (w: -1.3 m/s)	q
4	Austin Davis	United States	x	x	15.75 (w: 0.0 m/s)	15.75 (w: 0.0 m/s)	q
5	Mohamed Yusuf Salman	Bahrain	15.47 (w: -1.6 m/s)	x	15.63 (w: -0.2 m/s)	15.63 (w: -0.2 m/s)	q
6	Yu Jae-Hyuk	South Korea	x	14.77 (w: -0.3 m/s)	15.57 (w: -0.2 m/s)	15.57 (w: -0.2 m/s)	q
7	Askin Karaca	Turkey	15.25 (w: -0.4 m/s)	x	15.51 (w: -0.1 m/s)	15.51 (w: -0.1 m/s)	
8	Robert Falchi	Australia	x	15.51 (w: -0.6 m/s)	x	15.51 (w: -0.6 m/s)	
9	Louis-Grégory Occin	France	x	x	15.35 (w: -0.8 m/s)	15.35 (w: -0.8 m/s)	
10	Kyron Blaise	Trinidad and Tobago	14.56 (w: -0.7 m/s)	15.17 (w: -0.7 m/s)	14.84 (w: -1.8 m/s)	15.17 (w: -0.7 m/s)	
11	Riaan Arends	South Africa	15.01 (w: -2.0 m/s)	14.91 (w: -0.6 m/s)	14.90 (w: 0.0 m/s)	15.01 (w: -2.0 m/s)	
12	Artyom Grachev	Russia	x	14.22 (w: -2.0 m/s)	x	14.22 (w: -2.0 m/s)	
	Martinš Dakša	Latvia	x	x	x	NM	

== Participation ==
According to an unofficial count, 26 athletes from 20 countries participated in the event.

- Australia (2)
- Bahrain (1)
- Cuba (1)
- Dominican Republic (1)
- France (2)
- Italy (1)
- Latvia (1)
- Mexico (1)
- Poland (2)
- Romania (1)
- Russia (1)
- Saudi Arabia (1)
- Singapore (1)
- South Africa (2)
- South Korea (1)
- Spain (1)
- Trinidad and Tobago (1)
- Turkey (1)
- Ukraine (2)
- United States (2)
