= Athletics at the 2011 Summer Universiade – Men's triple jump =

The men's triple jump event at the 2011 Summer Universiade was held on 16–18 August.

== Medalists ==
| Gold | Silver | Bronze |
|---|---|---|
| Nelson Évora; Portugal | Viktor Kuznyetsov; Ukraine | Yevgeniy Ektov; Kazakhstan |

== Results ==
=== Qualification ===
Qualification: 16.50 m (Q) or at least 12 best (q) qualified for the final.

| Rank | Group | Athlete | Nationality | #1 | #2 | #3 | Result | Notes |
|---|---|---|---|---|---|---|---|---|
| 1 | A | Nelson Évora | Portugal | 16.58 | | | 16.58 | Q |
| 2 | A | Dong Bin | China | 16.09 | 16.48 | – | 16.48 | q |
| 3 | B | Matthias Uhrig | Germany | 16.05 | 16.46 | – | 16.46 | q |
| 4 | A | Viktor Kuznyetsov | Ukraine | 16.42 | – | – | 16.42 | q |
| 5 | B | Gaëtan Saku Bafuanga | France | 15.50 | 16.36 | – | 16.36 | q |
| 6 | B | Julian Reid | Great Britain | 15.98 | 16.28 | – | 16.28 | q |
| 7 | A | Sergey Laptev | Russia | 15.74 | 15.95 | 16.23 | 16.23 | q |
| 8 | A | Yevgeniy Ektov | Kazakhstan | x | 16.19 | 15.08 | 16.19 | q |
| 9 | B | Yevhen Semenenko | Ukraine | 16.18 | 16.10 | 16.03 | 16.18 | q |
| 10 | A | Igor Sjunin | Estonia | 16.12 | x | x | 16.12 | q |
| 11 | B | Elvijs Misāns | Latvia | 16.10 | 15.99 | 15.82 | 16.10 | q, SB |
| 12 | A | Hasheem Halim | United States Virgin Islands | 15.63 | x | 16.06 | 16.06 | q |
| 13 | B | Hilton Silva | Brazil | 15.65 | 15.98 | 15.83 | 15.98 | |
| 14 | A | Kim Donghan | South Korea | x | 15.98 | x | 15.98 | |
| 15 | B | Ma Le | China | 15.66 | 15.91 | 13.68 | 15.91 | |
| 16 | B | Tumelo Thagane | South Africa | x | 15.89 | x | 15.89 | |
| 17 | A | Mantas Dilys | Lithuania | 15.23 | 15.63 | 15.88 | 15.88 | |
| 18 | B | Peder Nielsen | Denmark | 15.88 | 15.77 | 15.65 | 15.83 | |
| 19 | B | Mamadou Gueye | Senegal | 15.51 | x | 15.09 | 15.51 | |
| 20 | A | Hugo Chila | Ecuador | 14.20 | 15.43 | 15.48 | 15.48 | |
| 21 | B | Zacharias Arnos | Cyprus | 15.13 | x | 15.43 | 15.43 | |
| 22 | B | Alex Kwofie | Ghana | 15.36 | 15.15 | 14.98 | 15.36 | |
| 23 | A | Eugene Vollmer | Fiji | 14.89 | 15.35 | x | 15.35 | |
| 24 | A | Sief El Islem Temacini | Algeria | 15.23 | 15.08 | 15.23 | 15.23 | |
| 25 | A | Kweku Ampiah Essam | Ghana | x | x | 15.06 | 15.06 | |
| 26 | B | Jure Sivic | Slovenia | 15.04 | x | x | 15.04 | |
| 27 | A | Jason Castro | Honduras | 14.82 | 13.70 | – | 14.82 | |
| 28 | B | Sten Veelak | Estonia | 13.65 | 14.48 | x | 14.48 | |
| 29 | A | Denvil Ruan | Anguilla | x | 14.38 | x | 14.38 | |
| 30 | A | Stian Aaltvedt | Norway | 14.15 | x | 13.92 | 14.15 | |
| 31 | B | Theerayut Philankong | Thailand | 13.70 | x | x | 13.70 | |
| 32 | B | Thalosang Tshireletso | Botswana | 13.44 | 13.65 | x | 13.65 | |
| 33 | B | Aude Ndamba Dianana | Republic of the Congo | x | x | 13.33 | 13.33 | |
| | A | Iao Taklei | Macau | x | x | – | NM | |
| | A | Elorm Amenakpor | Ghana | | | | DNS | |
| | B | Hillary Biwot | Kenya | | | | DNS | |
| | B | Kebby Malumbe | Zambia | | | | DNS | |

=== Final ===
| Rank | Athlete | Nationality | #1 | #2 | #3 | #4 | #5 | #6 | Result | Notes |
|---|---|---|---|---|---|---|---|---|---|---|
| 1st place, gold medalist(s) | Nelson Évora | Portugal | 16.88 | x | 16.84 | 16.88 | 17.31 | 16.99 | 17.31 | SB |
| 2nd place, silver medalist(s) | Viktor Kuznyetsov | Ukraine | 16.06 | 16.46 | 16.89 | 16.68 | 16.42 | 16.31 | 16.89 | |
| 3rd place, bronze medalist(s) | Yevgeniy Ektov | Kazakhstan | x | x | 16.18 | 15.99 | 16.83 | 16.40 | 16.83 | |
| 4 | Yevhen Semenenko | Ukraine | x | 16.56 | 15.98 | 16.66 | 16.69 | 16.51 | 16.69 | |
| 5 | Julian Reid | Great Britain | x | 16.46 | 16.58 | 16.31 | 16.45 | 16.61 | 16.61 | |
| 6 | Elvijs Misāns | Latvia | 16.58 | – | x | x | x | – | 16.58 | PB |
| 7 | Gaëtan Saku Bafuanga | France | 16.34 | 16.29 | x | 15.99 | 15.41 | 16.09 | 16.34 | |
| 8 | Dong Bin | China | x | 16.24 | x | 16.22 | 15.86 | 16.32 | 16.32 | |
| 9 | Matthias Uhrig | Germany | 16.11 | 15.87 | 15.78 | | | | 16.11 | |
| 10 | Sergey Laptev | Russia | 16.09 | 16.05 | x | | | | 16.09 | |
| 11 | Hasheem Halim | United States Virgin Islands | 14.47 | 15.64 | 15.49 | | | | 15.64 | |
| 12 | Igor Sjunin | Estonia | x | x | 14.64 | | | | 14.64 | |
