= Igor Sjunin =

Estonian triple jumper

Personal information
- Full name: Igor Sjunin
- Born: 4 December 1990 (age 35)

Igor Sjunin (born 4 December 1990) is an Estonian triple jumper.

== Personal bests ==
- Triple jump 16.86
- Long jump 7.59

== Achievements ==
Year	Competition	Venue	Position	Event	Notes
Representing Estonia
2010	European Championships	Barcelona, Spain	19th (q)	Triple jump	16.35 m
2011	European U23 Championships	Ostrava, Czech Republic	9th	Triple jump	16.25 m (wind: +1.2 m/s)
2011	Universiade	Shenzhen, China	12th	Triple jump	14.64 m
2012	European Championships	Helsinki, Finland	20th (q)	Triple jump	16.24 m
2013	Universiade	Kazan, Russia	–	Triple jump	NM
2015	Universiade	Gwangju, South Korea	27th (q)	Long jump	6.74 m
2015	Universiade	Gwangju, South Korea	13th (q)	Triple jump	15.46 m
