= Daniele Greco =

Italian triple jumper (born 1989)

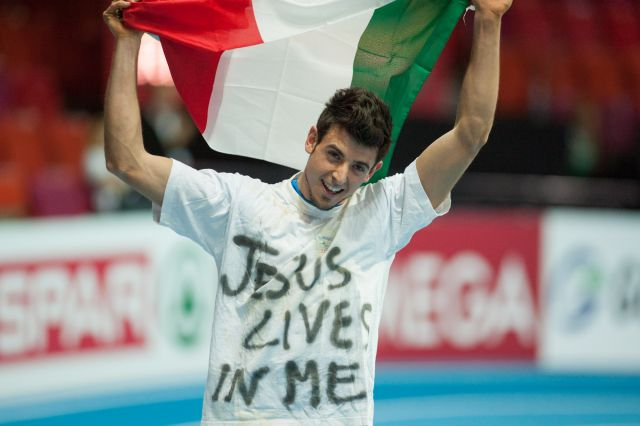
- Greco after his victory at Goteborg 2013

Personal information
- Nationality: Italian
- Born: 1 March 1989 (age 37) Nardò, Italy
- Height: 1.86 m (6 ft 1 in)
- Weight: 76 kg (168 lb)

Sport
- Country: Italy
- Sport: Athletics
- Event: Triple jump
- Club: G.S. Fiamme Oro
- Coached by: Umberto Pegoraro

Achievements and titles
- Personal bests: Triple jump: 17.47 m (2012); Triple jump indoor: 17.70 m (2013)
Medal record
European Indoor Championships
Gold medal – first place	2013 Gothenburg	Triple jump
European U23 Championships
Gold medal – first place	2009 Kaunas	Triple jump
Mediterranean Games
Gold medal – first place	2013 Mersin	Triple jump
Bronze medal – third place	2009 Pescara	Triple jump

Daniele Greco (born 1 March 1989) is an Italian athlete competing in the triple jump.

== Biography ==
On 9 June 2012 at Potenza, he jumped 17.47 m, that is the 2nd best performance in Italy of all-time, after the national record of Fabrizio Donato with the measure of 17.73 m. He won the National Championships in Brixen on 8 July 2012 with 17.67m (+3.4), defeating the European champion, Fabrizio Donato. In Goteborg 2013 he jumped a new personal best with the measure of 17.70 m and best year performance.

His best international result was the 4th place at the 2012 Summer Olympics and the gold medal at the 2013 European Indoor Championships.

== Achievements ==
Year	Competition	Venue	Result	Measure	Notes
Representing Italy
2007	European Junior Championships	(Netherlands) Hengelo	12th	15.00 m	
2008	World Junior Championships	(Poland) Bydgoszcz	4th	16.33 m (wind: -1.2 m/s)	
2009	European Indoor Championships	(Italy) Turin	14th (q)	15.76 m	
2009	Mediterranean Games	(Italy) Pescara	3rd	16.64 m	
2009	European U23 Championships	(Lithuania) Kaunas	1st	17.20 m (wind: 1.8 m/s)	
2009	World Championships	(Germany) Berlin	34th (q)	16.18 m	
2010	World Indoor Championships	(Qatar) Doha	19th (q)	15.60 m	
2010	European Championships	(Spain) Barcelona	17th (q)	16.51 m	
2011	European Indoor Championships	(France) Paris	8th	16.24 m	
2011	European U23 Championships	(Czech Republic) Ostrava	4th	16.55 m w (wind: +2.3 m/s)	
2012	World Indoor Championships	(Turkey) Istanbul	5th	17.28 m	
2012	European Championships	(Finland) Helsinki	23rd (q)	15.90 m	
2012	Olympic Games	(United Kingdom) London	4th	17.34 m	
2013	European Indoor Championships	(Sweden) Gothenburg	1st	17.70 m	
2013	Mediterranean Games	(Turkey) Mersin	1st	17.13 m	

== National titles ==
- 1 win in triple jump at the Italian Athletics Championships (2012)

== See also ==
- Italian all-time lists - Triple jump
