= Athletics at the 2012 Summer Olympics – Men's triple jump =

Men's triple jump at the Games of the XXX Olympiad
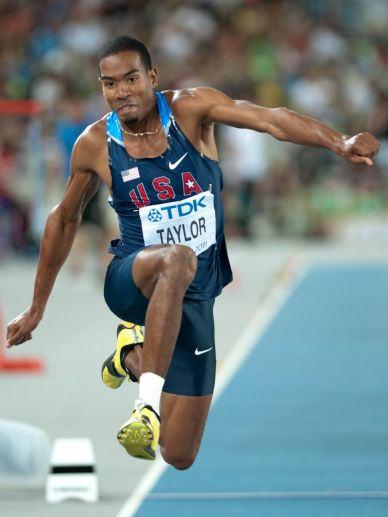
- Christian Taylor (2011)
- Venue: Olympic Stadium
- Dates: 7–9 August
- Competitors: 27 from 21 nations
- Winning distance: 17.81

Medalists
1st place, gold medalist(s)		Christian Taylor; United States
2nd place, silver medalist(s)		Will Claye; United States
3rd place, bronze medalist(s)		Fabrizio Donato; Italy

Official video highlights

The men's triple jump competition at the 2012 Summer Olympics in London, United Kingdom. The event was held at the Olympic Stadium on 7–9 August. Twenty-seven athletes from 21 nations competed. The event was won by Christian Taylor of the United States, the nation's first victory in the event since 1996 and seventh overall. His teammate Will Claye won silver; Claye was the first man to medal in both the long jump and triple jump since 1936. Fabrizio Donato earned Italy's first medal in the men's triple jump since 1968.

== Summary ==
In the qualifying round, Christian Taylor made the automatic qualifier on his first attempt, Leevan Sands made the only other auto qualifier. The two Italian jumpers Daniele Greco and Fabrizio Donato anticipated the outcome and let their first attempt marks qualify them to the finals, taking the rest of the other rounds off. Lyukman Adams and Will Claye took all three attempts to get in a sufficient jump. Host team favorite 2009 world champion Phillips Idowu made it to the qualifying round, but could not advance.

In the first round, 35-year-old Fabrizio Donato took the lead over 40 cm ahead of Alexis Copello. In the second round Will Claye took the lead, while Donato improved and his teammate Daniele Greco moved into third. Meanwhile, reigning world champion Christian Taylor was struggling to find the board, taking until his third jump just to get a mark to allow him three more attempts. Donato improved again. In the fourth round Taylor put it all together, jumping 17.81 to take what turned out to be an insurmountable lead. Donato made another improvement for his best attempt 17.48, though any of his four legal jumps would have won the bronze. Then Claye secured another silver medal with a 17.62

== Background ==
This was the 27th appearance of the event, which is one of 12 athletics events to have been held at every Summer Olympics. The returning finalists from the 2008 Games were silver medalist Phillips Idowu of Great Britain, bronze medalist Leevan Sands of the Bahamas, and fourth-place finisher Arnie David Giralt of Cuba. Idowu was among the favorites; he had won the 2009 world championship and come in second in 2011. The man who had beaten him was Christian Taylor of the United States, who led a smaller but stronger American team: only two Americans were in London, but both Taylor and Will Claye had made the podium at the 2011 worlds.

Haiti, the United Arab Emirates, and the Virgin Islands each made their first appearance in the event. The United States competed for the 26th time, having missed only the boycotted 1980 Games.

== Qualification ==
A National Olympic Committee (NOC) could enter up to 3 qualified athletes in the men's triple jump event if all athletes met the A standard, or 1 athlete if they met the B standard. The maximum number of athletes per nation had been set at 3 since the 1930 Olympic Congress. The qualifying distance standards could be obtained in various meets during the qualifying period that had the approval of the IAAF. Both outdoor and indoor meets were eligible. The A standard for the 2012 men's triple jump was 17.20 metres; the B standard was 16.85 metres. The qualifying period for was from 1 May 2011 to 8 July 2012. NOCs could also have an athlete enter the triple jump through a universality place. NOCs could enter one male athlete in an athletics event, regardless of time, if they had no male athletes meeting the qualifying A or B standards in any men's athletic event.

== Competition format ==
The competition consisted of two rounds, qualification and final. In qualification, each athlete jumped three times (stopping early if they made the qualifying distance of 17.10 metres). At least the top twelve athletes moved on to the final; if more than twelve reached the qualifying distance, all who did so advanced. Distances were reset for the final round. Finalists jumped three times, after which the eight best jumped three more times (with the best distance of the six jumps counted).

== Records ==
Prior to the competition, the existing world record, Olympic record, and world leading jump were as follows:

World record	Jonathan Edwards (GBR)	18.29	Gothenburg, Sweden	7 August 1995
Olympic record	Kenny Harrison (USA)	18.09	Atlanta, United States	27 August 1996
World Leading	Will Claye (USA)	17.70 (i)	Istanbul, Turkey	11 March 2012

== Schedule ==
All times are British Summer Time (UTC+1)

Date	Time	Round
Tuesday, 7 August 2012	10:45	Qualifying
Thursday, 9 August 2012	19:20	Final

== Results ==
=== Qualifying round ===
Qual. rule: qualification standard 17.10m (Q) or at least best 12 qualified (q).

Rank	Group	Athlete	Nation	1	2	3	Distance	Notes
1	B	Christian Taylor	United States	17.21 (+0.2)	—	—	17.21	Q
2	B	Leevan Sands	Bahamas	17.17 (-0.4)	—	—	17.17	Q
3	A	Benjamin Compaoré	France	16.82 (-0.5)	17.06 (+0.8)	—	17.06	q
4	A	Daniele Greco	Italy	17.00 (+0.6)	—	—	17.00	q
5	B	Dong Bin	China	X	16.94 (+0.1)	—	16.94	q
6	A	Lyukman Adams	Russia	16.67 (-1.0)	X	16.88 (-0.9)	16.88	q
7	A	Will Claye	United States	16.56 (-0.5)	16.44 (-1.5)	16.87 (-0.2)	16.87	q
8	B	Fabrizio Donato	Italy	16.86 (-1.2)	—	—	16.86	q
9	A	Tosin Oke	Nigeria	16.59 (-1.3)	16.83 (-0.3)	X	16.83	q
10	A	Samyr Lainé	Haiti	16.14 (0.0)	16.81 (+1.4)	X (+0.1)	16.81	q
11	B	Alexis Copello	Cuba	X	16.70 (-0.7)	16.79 (+1.0)	16.79	q
12	A	Dzmitry Platnitski	Belarus	X	15.66 (-0.4)	16.62 (+0.3)	16.62	q
13	B	Sheryf El-Sheryf	Ukraine	16.60 (+0.4)	14.83 (-2.5)	X	16.60	
14	A	Phillips Idowu	Great Britain	16.47 (-0.7)	X	16.53 (-1.0)	16.53	
15	B	Issam Nima	Algeria	15.21 (-0.7)	X	16.50 (+0.5)	16.50	
16	A	Arnie David Giralt	Cuba	15.74 (+1.1)	16.42 (+0.1)	16.45 (+1.1)	16.45	
17	B	Henry Frayne	Australia	16.25 (+0.2)	16.35 (+0.2)	16.40 (-0.2)	16.40	
18	B	Muhammad Halim	Virgin Islands	15.54 (-0.6)	16.39 (-0.6)	15.31 (+0.5)	16.39	
19	A	Yevgeniy Ektov	Kazakhstan	X	16.31 (-0.1)	X	16.31	
20	A	Cao Shuo	China	16.11 (-1.8)	16.26 (+1.2)	16.27 (-1.2)	16.27	
21	B	Roman Valiyev	Kazakhstan	X	X	16.23 (-1.0)	16.23	
22	B	Kim Deok-Hyeon	South Korea	15.35 (-0.8)	X	16.22 (-0.3)	16.22	
23	B	Yoandris Betanzos	Cuba	14.84 (+0.2)	16.22 (+2.9)	X	16.22	
24	B	Mohamed Abbas Darwish	United Arab Emirates	X	16.06 (+1.7)	15.93 (+1.6)	16.06	
25	A	José Adrián Sornoza	Ecuador	15.61 (-0.5)	16.04 (-2.4)	X	16.04	
26	B	Jonathan Henrique Silva	Brazil	15.59 (-1.3)	X	X	15.59	
—	A	Renjith Maheshwary	India	X	X	X	No mark	

=== Final ===
Rank	Athlete	Nation	1	2	3	4	5	6	Distance	Notes
1st place, gold medalist(s)	Christian Taylor	United States	X	X	17.15	17.81	17.55	X	17.81	SB
2nd place, silver medalist(s)	Will Claye	United States	X	17.54	17.43	17.62	17.25	16.66	17.62	
3rd place, bronze medalist(s)	Fabrizio Donato	Italy	17.38	17.44	17.45	17.48	–	X	17.48	
4	Daniele Greco	Italy	16.90	17.34	X	X	–	16.92	17.34	
5	Leevan Sands	Bahamas	X	17.19	17.12	X	–	–	17.19	
6	Benjamin Compaoré	France	15.53	17.08	14.16	16.27	13.68	X	17.08	
7	Tosin Oke	Nigeria	X	16.91	16.95	X	X	X	16.95	
8	Alexis Copello	Cuba	16.92	X	X	14.75	X	16.68	16.92	
~~9~~	Lyukman Adams	Russia	~~16.78~~	X	X	Did not advance			~~16.78~~	DPG
9	Dong Bin	China	16.75	X	X	Did not advance			16.75	
10	Samyr Lainé	Haiti	X	16.65	16.59	Did not advance			16.65	
11	Dzmitry Platnitski	Belarus	16.08	X	16.19	Did not advance			16.19	
