= Şeref Osmanoğlu =

Turkish and former Ukrainian athlete (born 1989)

Şerif Osmanoğlu
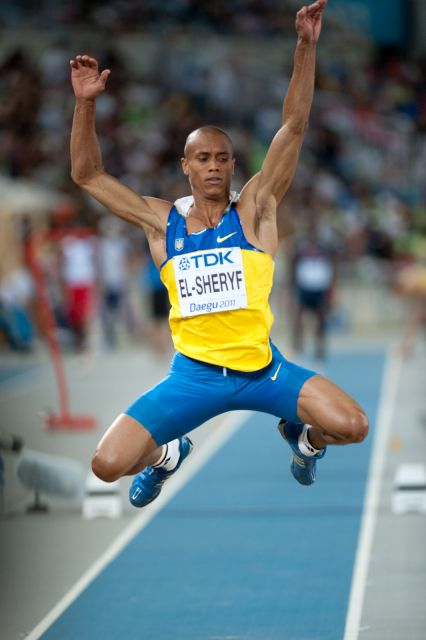
- El-Sheryf during the 2011 World Championships

Personal information
- Born: 2 January 1989 (age 37) Simferopol, Ukrainian SSR, Soviet Union
- Height: 1.76 m (5 ft 9 in)
- Weight: 58 kg (128 lb)

Sport
- Country: Ukraine (until May 2013); Turkey (since May 2013)
- Event(s): Triple jump, Long jump

Achievements and titles
- Personal best: 17.72 m
Medal record
Diamond League Final
Second place	2011	Triple jump
European Championships
Silver medal – second place	2012 Helsinki	Triple jump

Şerif Osmanoğlu (born Sheryf El-Sheryf; 2 January 1989) is a Turkish and former Ukrainian (until May 2013) athlete who competes in the triple jump and occasionally long jump.

== Career ==
He won gold medal at the 2011 European Athletics U23 Championships with a leap of 17.72m, bettering his personal best by 80 cm. In 2012, he won the silver medal in the triple jump at the European Athletics Championships.

He has a Ukrainian mother while his father, a doctor, is from Sudan. He changed his allegiance to Turkey in 2013, also changing his name to Şeref Osmanoğlu. The Turkish federation paid $152,000 to the Ukrainian federation for the transfer.

== Competition record ==
Year	Competition	Venue	Position	Event	Notes
Representing Ukraine
2005	World Youth Championships	Marrakesh, Morocco	5th	Triple jump	16.18 m
2006	World Junior Championships	Beijing, China	5th	Triple jump	16.09 m (-0.2 m/s)
2007	European Junior Championships	Kaunas, Lithuania	7th	Triple jump	15.93 m
2008	World Junior Championships	Bydgoszcz, Poland	25th (q)	Long jump	6.94 m (-0.4 m/s)
2008	World Junior Championships	Bydgoszcz, Poland	9th	Triple jump	15.43 m (-1.3 m/s)
2011	European Team Championships Super League	Stockholm, Sweden	9th	Long jump	7.68 m
2011	European U23 Championships	Ostrava, Czech Republic	1st	Triple jump	17.72 m (+1.3 m/s)
2011	World Championships	Daegu, South Korea	12th	Triple jump	16.38 m
2012	World Indoor Championships	Istanbul, Turkey	12th (q)	Triple jump	16.25 m
2012	European Championships	Helsinki, Finland	2nd	Triple jump	17.28 m (w)
2012	Olympic Games	London, United Kingdom	13th (q)	Triple jump	16.60 m
Representing Turkey
2016	European Championships	Amsterdam, Netherlands	6th	Triple jump	16.55 m
2016	Olympic Games	Rio de Janeiro, Brazil	–	Triple jump	NM
