= Henry Frayne (athlete) =

Australian track and field athlete

Personal information
- Nationality: Australian
- Born: 14 April 1990 (age 36) Adelaide, South Australia, Australia
- Height: 188 cm (6 ft 2 in)
- Weight: 82 kg (181 lb)

Sport
- Sport: Athletics
- Events: Triple Jump, Long Jump
- Club: Old Melburnians Athletic Club
- Team: Qld Academy of Sport
- Coached by: Gary Bourne

Achievements and titles
- Olympic finals: 2012 London Olympics, 2016 Rio Olympics
- World finals: 2011 World Championships
Medal record
Representing Australia
World Indoor Championships
Silver medal – second place	2012 Istanbul	Long jump
Commonwealth Games
Silver medal – second place	2018 Gold Coast	Long jump
Oceania Athletics Championships
Silver medal – second place	2024 Suva	Long jump

Henry Frayne (born 14 April 1990) is an Australian track and field athlete who competes in triple jump and long jump. He qualified for the 2020 Tokyo Olympics and finished 14th in qualifying with a distance of 7.93m, and did not qualify for the final.

Frayne trains under Gary Bourne who also coaches or has coached Mitchell Watt, Chris Noffke, Jai Taurima and Bronwyn Thompson.

== Early years ==
Frayne was South Australian born and raised but in 2007, as a 16-year-old, he followed his coach, Vasily Grishchenkov, and moved to Melbourne. He was already a talented triple jumper in his early teens.

Frayne raised the national junior triple jump record three times in 2008 and 2009, and was then placed fifth at the 2008 World Junior Championships. In 2010, he moved to Brisbane under coach Gary Bourne, his current coach. In 2011, he was placed ninth in the triple jump at the IAAF World Championships and his first 17-metre jump.

== Achievements ==
Frayne won the silver medal in the long jump event at the 2012 IAAF World Indoor Championships in Istanbul, Turkey. Frayne's personal best at long jump is 8.34 m (2018) and at triple jump 17.23 m (2012). He competed at the 2011 World Championships where he placed 9th in the triple jump final. Frayne competed at the 2012 London Olympics in both the long jump and triple jump, and qualified for the 2016 Rio Olympics in the long jump, finishing 7th in the final. He jumped a personal best 8.34 m to qualify for the final at the 2018 Commonwealth Games in Australia, where he finished with the silver medal behind world champion Luvo Manyonga.

He is a nephew of 1984 Olympian Bruce Frayne.

Frayne completed a Bachelor of Commerce at Deakin University.

== Competition record ==
Year	Competition	Venue	Position	Event	Notes
Representing Australia
2008	World Junior Championships	Bydgoszcz, Poland	5th	Triple jump	16.29 m (-0.8 m/s)
2009	Universiade	Belgrade, Serbia	12th	Triple jump	16.11 m
2011	World Championships	Daegu, South Korea	9th	Triple jump	16.78 m
2012	World Indoor Championships	Istanbul, Turkey	2nd	Long jump	8.23 m
2012	Olympic Games	London, United Kingdom	9th	Long jump	7.85 m
2012	Olympic Games	London, United Kingdom	17th (q)	Triple jump	16.40 m
2014	Commonwealth Games	Glasgow, United Kingdom	8th (q)	Long jump	7.85 m
2016	Olympic Games	Rio de Janeiro, Brazil	7th	Long jump	8.06 m
2017	World Championships	London, United Kingdom	14th (q)	Long jump	7.88 m
2018	Commonwealth Games	Gold Coast, Australia	2nd	Long jump	8.33 m
2019	World Championships	Doha, Qatar	13th (q)	Long jump	7.86 m
2021	Olympic Games	Tokyo, Japan	14th (q)	Long jump	7.93 m
2022	World Championships	Eugene, United States	12th	Long jump	7.80 m
2023	World Championships	Budapest, Hungary	20th (q)	Long jump	7.78 m
