= Artsyom Bandarenka =

Belarusian triple jumper

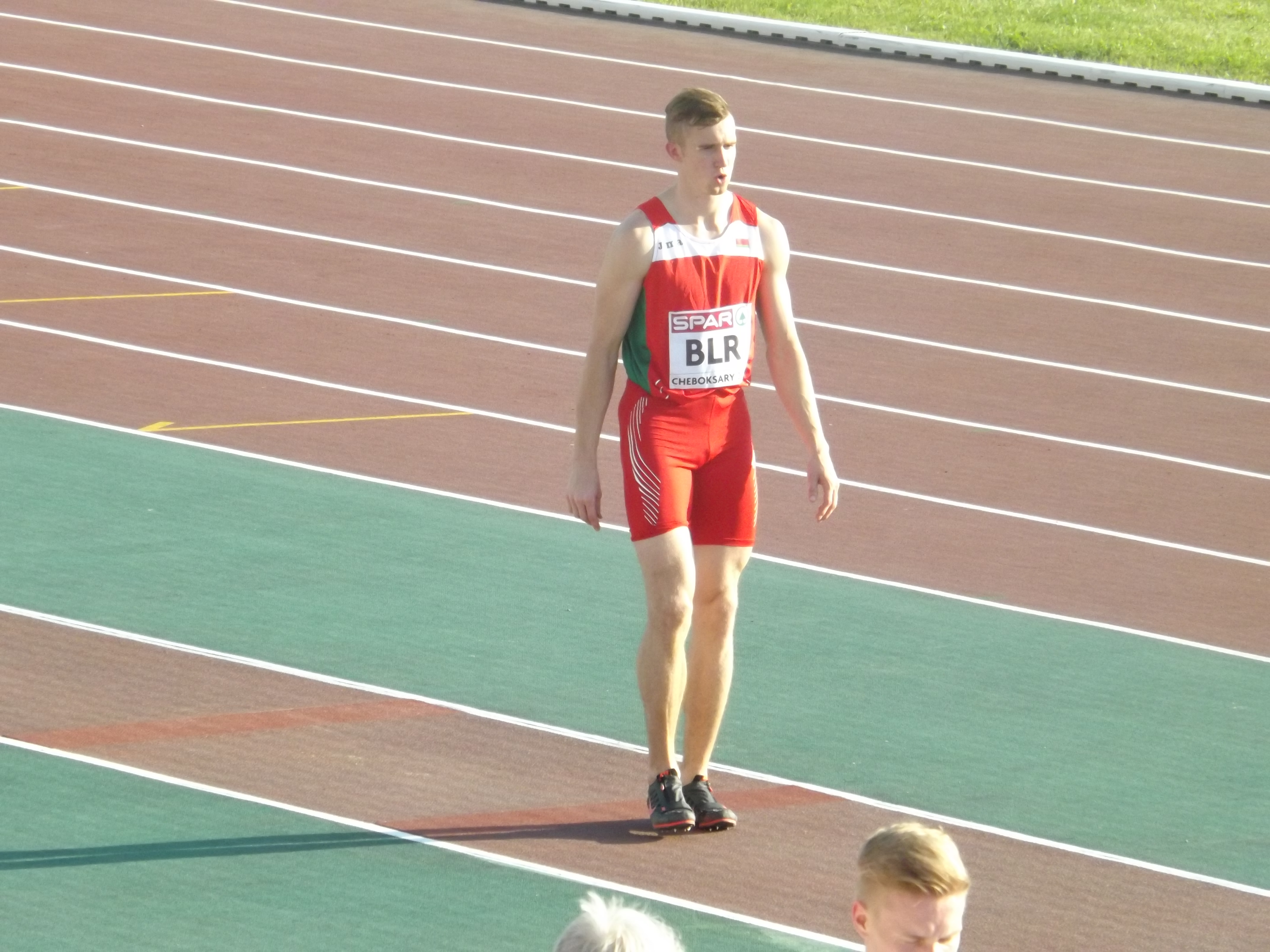
Artsem Bandarenka (2015).

Artsyom (Artsem) Bandarenka (Belarusian: Арцём Юр’евіч Бандарэнка) (born June 19, 1991) is a Belarusian triple jumper. He competed at the 2016 Summer Olympics in the men's triple jump event; his result of 15.43 meters in the qualifying round did not qualify him for the final.
