= Aliaksei Tsapik =

Belarusian athletics competitor

Personal information
- Full name: Aliaksei Tsapik
- Born: 4 August 1988 (age 37)

Sport
- Country: Belarus
- Sport: Athletics
- Event(s): Triple Jump, Long Jump

Achievements and titles
- Regional finals: 3rd at the 2012 European Athletics Championships

Aliaksei Tsapik (Belarusian: Аляксей Цапік; born 4 August 1988) is a Belarusian athlete who competes in the triple jump and long jump with a personal best result of 16.82 metres at the triple jump.

Tsapik won the bronze medal at the 2012 European Athletics Championships in Helsinki at the triple jump.

== Competition record ==
Year	Competition	Venue	Position	Notes
Representing Belarus
2007	European Junior Championships	Hengelo, Netherlands	8th	15.64 m
2012	European Championships	Helsinki, Finland	3rd	16.97 m (w)
2013	European Indoor Championships	Gothenburg, Sweden	13th (q)	16.45 m
2014	European Championships	Zürich, Switzerland	20th (q)	15.92 m
