= Benjamin Compaoré =

French triple jumper

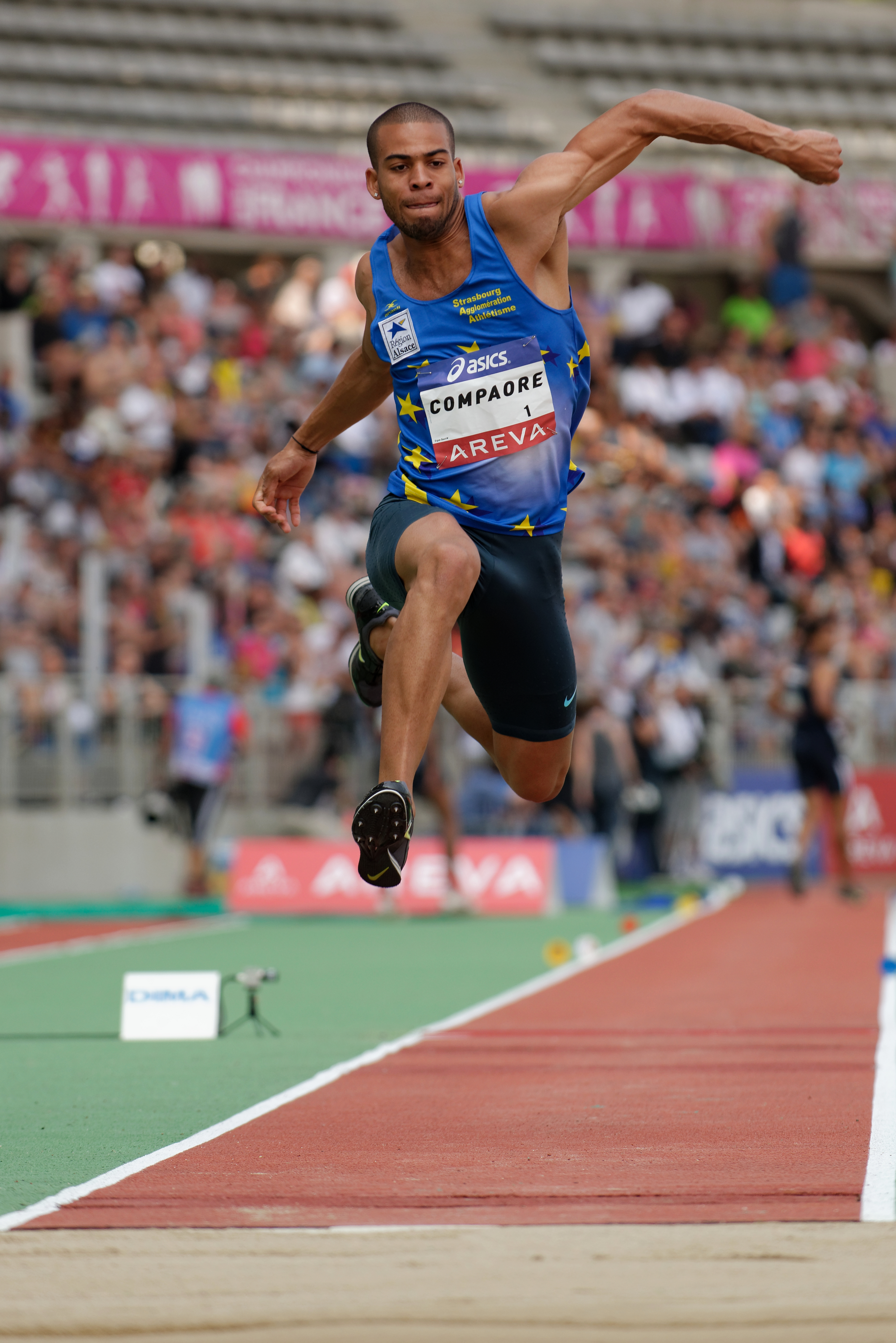
- Compaoré in 2013

Personal information
- Born: 5 August 1987 (age 39) Bar-le-Duc, France
- Height: 1.88 m (6 ft 2 in)
- Weight: 72 kg (159 lb)

Sport
- Country: France
- Sport: Athletics
- Event: Triple jump
Medal record
Men's athletics
Representing France
World Indoor Championships
Bronze medal – third place	2016 Portland	Triple jump
European Championships
Gold medal – first place	2014 Zurich	Triple jump

Benjamin Compaoré (born 5 August 1987) is a French athlete specialising in the triple jump. He competed at the 2012 Summer Olympics and the 2016 Summer Olympics.

Compaoré won the gold medal at the 2014 European Championships and the bronze at the 2016 World Indoor Championships.

His personal bests in the event are 17.48 metres outdoors (-0.1 m/s, Marrakesh 2014) and 17.14 metres indoors (Liévin 2012).

== Personal life ==
Born in France, Compaoré was born to a Burkinabe father and French mother. He has a daughter with his wife, the Spanish triple jumper Ana Peleteiro, born in 2022 and called Lua. He has three other daughters (Cassandra, Olympia and Iris) from a previous relationship.

== Achievements ==
Year	Competition	Venue	Position	Event	Notes
Representing France
2005	European Junior Championships	Kaunas, Lithuania	5th	Triple jump	15.81 m
2006	World Junior Championships	Beijing, China	1st	Triple jump	16.61 m (-0.5 m/s)
2007	European Indoor Championships	Birmingham, United Kingdom	13th (q)	Triple jump	16.19 m
2010	European Championships	Barcelona, Spain	5th	Triple jump	16.99 m
2011	World Championships	Daegu, South Korea	8th	Triple jump	17.17 m
2012	World Indoor Championships	Istanbul, Turkey	6th	Triple jump	17.05 m
2012	Olympic Games	London, United Kingdom	6th	Triple jump	17.08 m
2013	European Indoor Championships	Gothenburg, Sweden	10th (q)	Triple jump	16.48 m
2014	European Championships	Zurich, Switzerland	1st	Triple jump	17.46 m
2015	World Championships	Beijing, China	12th	Triple jump	16.63 m
2016	World Indoor Championships	Portland, United States	3rd	Triple jump	17.09 m
2016	European Championships	Amsterdam, Netherlands	12th	Triple jump	16.12 m
2016	Olympic Games	Rio de Janeiro, Brazil	10th	Triple jump	16.54 m
2017	World Championships	London, United Kingdom	21st (q)	Triple jump	16.46 m
2019	World Championships	Doha, Qatar	22nd (q)	Triple jump	16.59 m
2021	Olympic Games	Tokyo, Japan	19th (q)	Triple jump	16.59 m
2022	World Championships	Eugene, United States	25th (q)	Triple jump	16.03 m
2022	European Championships	Munich, Germany	20th (q)	Triple jump	15.17 m
2023	European Indoor Championships	Istanbul, Turkey	8th	Triple jump	16.11 m
2024	European Championships	Rome, Italy	12th	Triple jump	16.05 m
