= Teddy Tamgho =

French triple jumper

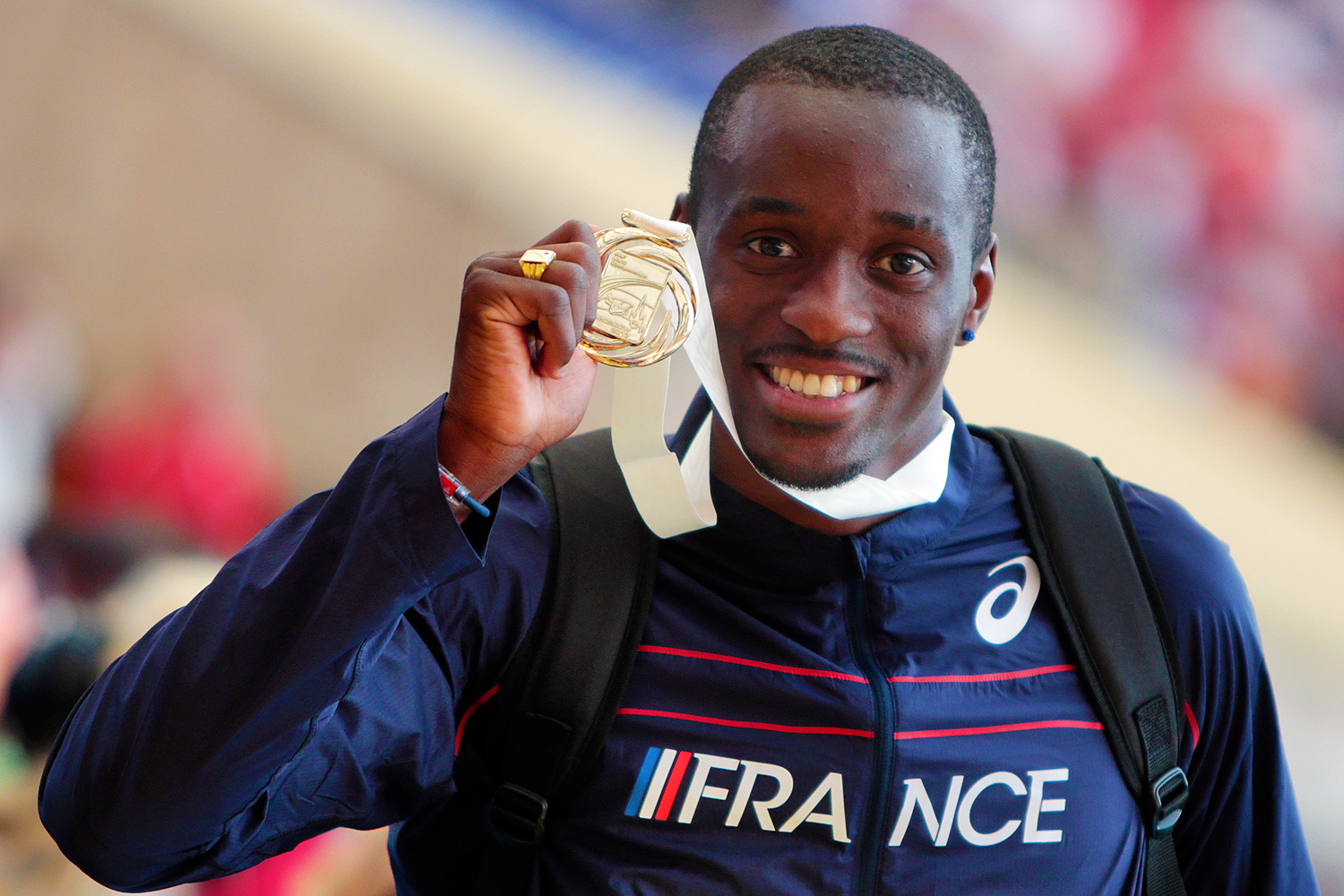
- Tamgho on 14th IAAF World Championships

Personal information
- Born: 15 June 1989 (age 37) Paris, France
- Height: 1.87 m (6 ft 1 1/2 in)
- Weight: 82 kg (181 lb)

Sport
- Sport: Athletics
- Club: Dynamic Aulnay Club (2004–2007); CA Montreuil 93 (2008–2014); Saint-Denis Emotion (2015– )
- Now coaching: Cyréna Samba-Mayela (2019–); Marthe Koala
Medal record
Men's athletics
Representing France
World Championships
Gold medal – first place	2013 Moscow	Triple jump
World Indoor Championships
Gold medal – first place	2010 Doha	Triple jump
European Championships
Bronze medal – third place	2010 Barcelona	Triple jump
European Indoor Championships
Gold medal – first place	2011 Paris	Triple jump

Teddy Tamgho (born 15 June 1989) is a French triple jumper. He is the former triple jump world indoor record holder, achieved in winning the final and gold medal at the 2011 European Indoor Championships. He is the world's sixth best ever triple jumper outdoors, with his best mark of 18.04 metres achieved in winning the final and gold medal at the 2013 World Championships.

Tamgho's first triple jump gold medal came at the 2008 World Junior Championships and he reached the triple jump final (where he finished in 11th position) of the World Championships the following year. He came to prominence by setting his first triple jump world indoor record of 17.90 m in winning the triple jump final and gold medal at the 2010 World Indoor Championships. He was the triple jump overall winner of the 2010 IAAF Diamond League and the triple jump bronze medallist at the 2010 European Championships. Tamgho missed the 2012 London Olympics because of an operation on his right ankle.

Tamgho also mentors fellow French triple jumper Rouguy Diallo, who won the gold medal at the 2014 World Junior Championships in Athletics in Eugene, Oregon.

== Career ==
=== 2007–2009: Early part of his career ===
Born in Paris, France, Teddy Tamgho became interested in athletics as a young boy growing up in the commune of Sevran. He began representing Dynamic Aulnay Club in triple jump competitions from the age of 13. His first international championships appearance came at the 2007 European Junior Championships and he just missed out on the podium, taking fourth, but still managed a personal best jump of 16.35 m. At the end of 2007, in Eaubonne, he set a new national junior record of 16.53 m. He registered a mark of 16.94 metres to win his first French National Indoor Championships senior triple jump title on 16 February 2008 in Bordeaux — a jump which made him the second best junior triple jumper indoors of all time internationally, just behind Volker Mai. Tamgho stated that his run-up speed was his strong point and that his success was a result of working with his coach, Jean-Hervé Stievenart, and training partners Karl Taillepierre and Benjamin Compaoré.

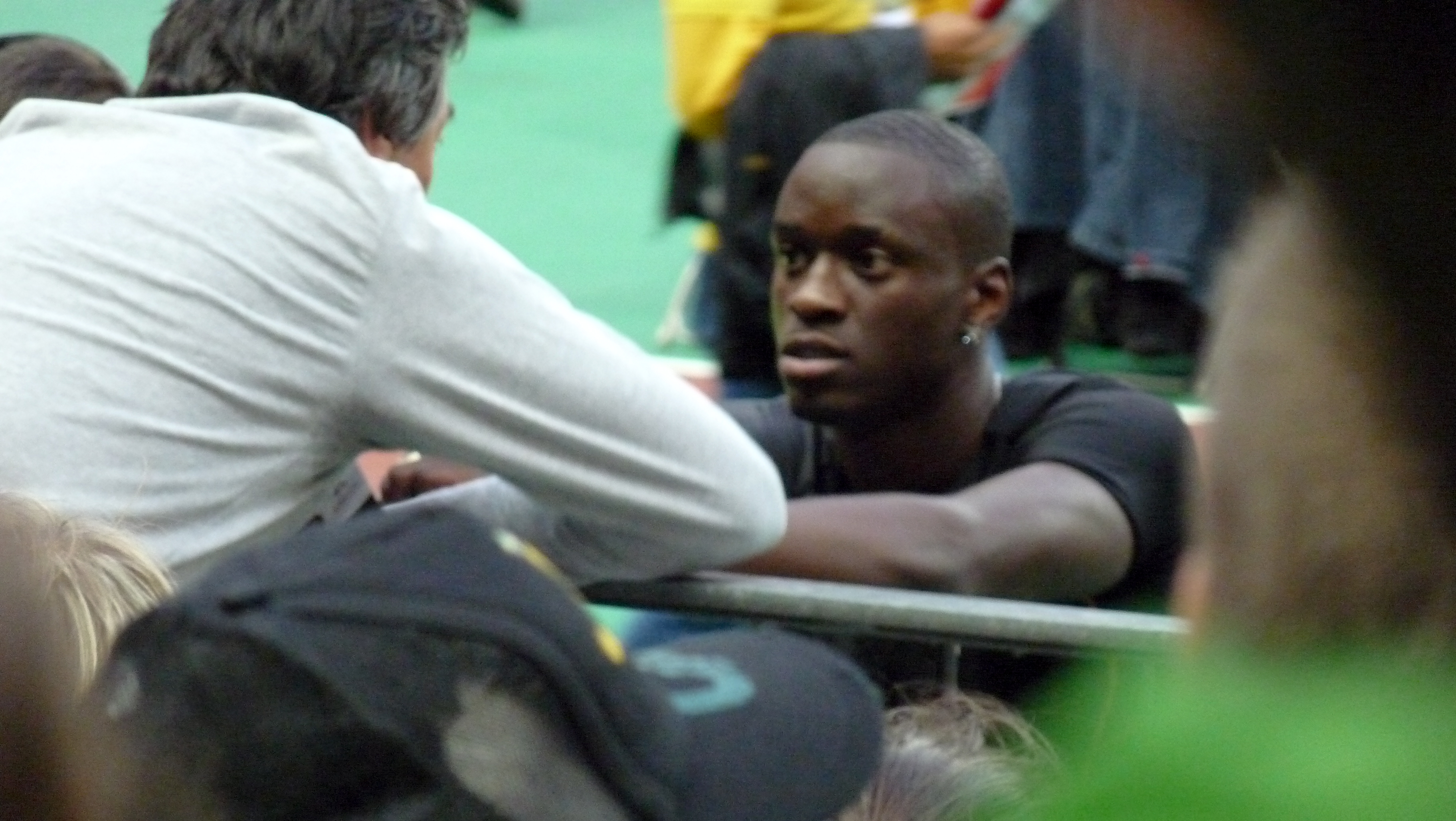
Tamgho in discussion with his coach at the 2009 Meeting Areva.

Going into the 2008 outdoor season, Tamgho achieved the Olympic qualifying mark (17.10 m) but the tailwind of 2.1 m/s was slightly too strong to make his jump valid. He did not manage to achieve the requisite mark in time for the Olympic team selection and it was Colomba Fofana who took the only men's triple jump berth in the 2008 French Olympic team. Tamgho won the 2008 World Junior Championships gold medal with a jump of 17.33 m in the final, but the mark was wind-aided (2.1 m/s), just outside the legal limit of 2.0 m/s. Tamgho was the only athlete to clear the 17m mark in that final, and he did it thrice. He failed to repeat his form at the French national outdoor championships, and was fourth in 16.79 m—far behind the event winner Jules Lechanga.

Coached by Jean-Hervé Stievenart and Laurence Bily, Tamgho started the 2009 indoor season with notable improvements, beating his 16.94 m (set on 16 February 2008) indoor personal best three times consecutively in Mondeville on 1 February (the best jump was 17.37 m). He improved even further in mid February at the Palais Omnisports de Paris-Bercy indoor meeting in Paris with a jump of 17.58 m (he had a foul jump near the 17.80 m mark) — a new under-23 world record and just one centimetre short of the French national indoor record set by Pierre Camara in 1993 in Toronto. He then jumped 17.44 m to claim his second senior national indoor triple jump title at the 2009 French National Indoor Championships in Liévin. Tamgho had been competing in recent weeks with an injury, however, and he used the two weeks leading to the 2009 European Indoor Championships in Turin as recovery time. At those championships he opened with a jump of 15.94m but fouled his remaining two jumps, and was thus eliminated in the qualification round despite being one of the favourites of the triple jump event.

At the start of the 2009 outdoor season he lined up against the 2008 Olympics silver medallist Phillips Idowu at the Meeting Areva in Paris. While Idowu jumped 17.17 m to earn victory, Tamgho was well below his top form and jumped 16.97 m to take fifth place. He confirmed himself as the nation's top triple jumper in July 2009 by winning his first French National Outdoor Championships (held in Angers) senior triple jump title with a jump of 17.11 m (which was his best jump of the year). That was enough to earn him qualification for the upcoming World Championships in Berlin. At the 2009 World Championships in August, Tamgho qualified for the final with a jump of 17.11 m in the qualification round. However, he did not improve in the final. He could only finish the final in eleventh position, with only one legal jump in the final (16.79 m).

=== 2010–2013: Major international championships gold medals and world records ===
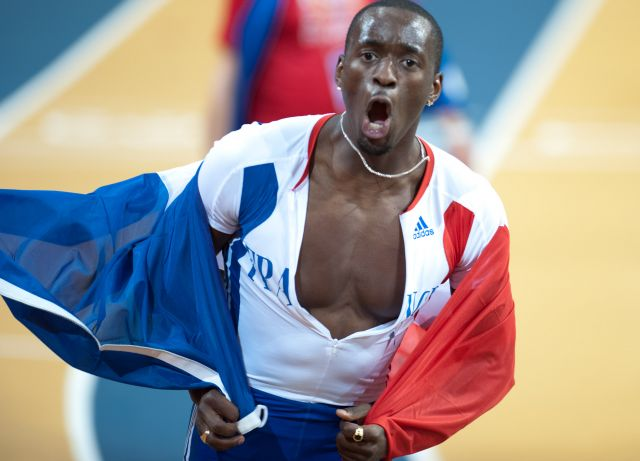
Tamgho celebrates his indoor world record in Doha

After finishing as runner-up to Colomba Fofana in the triple jump senior category at the French National Indoor Championships in February 2010 with a jump of 17.01 m, Tamgho turned his attention on the global stage. At the 2010 World Indoor Championships, he took an early lead in the triple jump final with a jump of 17.41 m, but Yoandri Betanzos surprised him with a 17.69 m personal best in the first round. Tamgho initially thought a lesser jump would have been enough to secure the title, but following the Cuban's jump he said "I had to react and give it all". After a couple of fouls and two more jumps past the 17-metre mark, Tamgho had one final jump left to overhaul Betanzos. On his last attempt, he jumped seven centimetres clear of the existing indoor world record mark (jointly held by Aliecer Urrutia and Christian Olsson) to set a new world indoor record of 17.90 m and break Pierre Camara's 17-year-old national indoor record of 17.59m. He said he thought his previous season had been flawed, but that he had now grown stronger and matured, following advice from fellow competitors Jadel Gregório and Phillips Idowu to take part in competitions in a calmer manner.

Tamgho's good form continued into the 2010 outdoor season. He recorded a series of five jumps over 17 metres at the French National Interclub Championships, highlighted by a world leading jump of 17.63 m (and a new French national record), on 23 May in Franconville. He had a wind-assisted jump of 17.63 m two weeks later in Montreuil. On 12 June 2010, he took part in the Adidas Grand Prix in New York City, his first IAAF Diamond League event. In that event, he jumped 17.60 m in the third round, and improved by a centimetre in the next jump before setting a personal best of 17.84 m to take the lead. Having already secured victory, he pushed even further with his final attempt to jump 17.98 m, making himself the third best triple jumper outdoors on the all-time list behind Jonathan Edwards and Kenny Harrison. Just three days before his 21st birthday, Tamgho had achieved the longest triple jump outdoors for over a decade. He won the 2010 French National Outdoor Championships senior triple jump title for the second time, but had to contend with a right calf cramp en route to victory. He was ruled out of the Paris Diamond League meeting due to injury. He had not jumped in training in the buildup to the 2010 European Championships, but he still managed to clear 17.45 m to take the bronze medal, his first medal at the competition. Wins at the DN Galan and Memorial Van Damme triple jump events made him the inaugural 2010 IAAF Diamond League triple jump overall winner. He announced a change of coach at the end of the season, starting work with four-time long jump world champion Iván Pedroso. He was recognised as the 2010 European Athletics Rising Star of the Year for his breakthrough year.

Tamgho started 2011 in similarly strong form as he improved his world indoor record by a centimetre to win the French National Indoor Championships senior triple jump title for the third time with a jump of 17.91m. He improved his world indoor record one centimetre further at the 2011 European Indoor Championships, clearing 17.92 m in the triple jump final on both the second and fourth jumps, to take the gold medal with a new world indoor record in front of the home crowd at the Palais Omnisports de Paris-Bercy in Paris. The day before the triple jump final, Tamgho had narrowly failed to win the bronze medal in the long jump event of the 2011 European Indoor Championships. He finished the long jump final in 4th position, jumping only 2 cm less than the bronze medallist Morten Jensen.

On 30 June 2011, Tamgho achieved an outdoor jump of 17.91 m at the 2011 IAAF Diamond League Athletissima athletics meeting in Lausanne. That mark would remain the world leading outdoor jump for 2011 until Christian Taylor beat it by 5 cm on September 4 in the triple jump final of the 2011 World Championships in Daegu. Tamgho fractured his right ankle while warming up for the qualification round of the 2011 European Under-23 Championships that was held in Ostrava in July 2011. He was thus forced to pull out of the upcoming 2011 World Championships in Daegu and for the rest of the year he did not take part in any athletics event held after the 2011 European Under-23 Championships in Ostrava. He underwent surgery on his fractured right ankle in the second half of 2011.

In December 2011, Tamgho was handed a 12-month ban from competition by his national athletics federation, half of which was suspended, for assaulting a female athlete following his altercation with her at the CREPS sports training camp in Saint-Raphaël at the end of October 2011. He was also fined €1,500 and ordered to complete 50 hours of community service. He thus missed the chance to defend his triple jump title at the 2012 IAAF World Indoor Championships in March but would be eligible to participle in the 2012 Olympics in London. He accepted the verdict and expressed his regret.

Tamgho was forced to pull out of the 2012 Olympics in London after undergoing a right ankle operation on 4 June 2012 to remove a bone growth that was the result of the right ankle fracture sustained in July 2011.

Tamgho returned to athletics competition in May 2013 after an absence of 22 months. He had earlier skipped the entire indoor season of 2013 to concentrate on his preparations for the 2013 World Championships in Moscow. He won the 2013 World Championships men's triple jump gold medal with a jump of 18.04 m in the final, which made him only the third man in history, after Jonathan Edwards and Kenny Harrison, to jump 18.00 m or more outdoors. In the final, on three of his first five jumps, Tamgho appeared to land beyond the 18-metres barrier but all of these jumps were slight fouls. He was just two centimetres over the board on his second and third jumps, and six centimetres over the board on his fifth. Therefore, before attempting his sixth and final jump, only his first (17.65m) and fourth jump (17.68m) were legal jumps. On his sixth and final jump, he hit the board square and legally jumped over the 18-metres barrier for the first time in his life. Tamgho became the first ever French male World Championships medallist in the triple jump and the first French World Championships gold medallist in any event since 2005.

After fracturing his left tibia during training on 27 November 2013, Tamgho was immediately sent to the Pitié-Salpêtrière Hospital in Paris, where he successfully underwent surgery on his left tibia on the following day. On 13 December 2013 at a press conference in Paris, Tamgho announced that he would miss the entire 2014 athletics season in order to recover fully from his left tibia surgery. "My goal is to be number one and I will not enter any competition if I am not at 100 percent of my capabilities. I do not want to rush things."

In December 2013, Tamgho was chosen as the 2013 French male athlete of the year, according to an Internet poll taken from the athletics fraternity, in which more than 2500 votes were cast over two weeks. The poll was conducted by the Fédération française d'athlétisme.

=== 2014–2015 ===
On 21 June 2014, the IAAF announced that Tamgho would be suspended from athletics for a period of one year for failing to make himself available for anti-doping tests three times (on 19 Dec 2012, 28 Jan 2014 and 18 Mar 2014) within an 18-month period. The suspension took effect from 18 March 2014 and would last until 17 March 2015.

In March 2015. Tamgho returned to competition with a jump of 16.78 m in a meeting held in a northern suburb of Paris after an absence of 18 months due to injury and the IAAF suspension. On 15 May 2015, Tamgho ruptured his Achilles tendon during the Diamond League meeting in Doha, forcing him to miss the upcoming 2015 World Championships in Beijing.

== Personal bests ==
Event	Best (m)	Venue	Date
Triple jump (outdoor)	18.04	Moscow, Russia	18 August 2013
Triple jump (indoor)	17.92	Paris, France	6 March 2011
Long jump (outdoor)	7.81	Valence, France	31 August 2013
Long jump (indoor)	8.01	Eaubonne, France	13 February 2011

- All information taken from IAAF profile.

== Triple jump competition record ==
Year	Competition	Venue	Position	Notes
Representing France
2007	European Junior Championships	Narbonne, France	4th	16.35 m
2008	World Junior Championships	Bydgoszcz, Poland	1st	17.33 m (wind: -2.1 m/s)
2009	European Indoor Championships	Turin, Italy	13th (qualifiers)	15.94 m
2009	World Championships	Berlin, Germany	11th	16.79 m
2010	World Indoor Championships	Doha, Qatar	1st	17.90 m WR
2010	European Championships	Barcelona, Spain	3rd	17.45 m
2011	French National Indoor Championships	Aubière, France	1st	17.91 m WR
2011	European Indoor Championships	Paris, France	1st	17.92 m WR
2011	European U23 Championships	Ostrava, Czech Republic	—	NM
2013	World Championships	Moscow, Russia	1st	18.04 m WL

- French National Indoor Championships: winner of the senior title in 2008, 2009, 2011 and 2016
- French National Outdoor Championships: winner of the senior title in 2009, 2010, 2013 and 2016

Records
Preceded by (Cuba) Aliecer Urrutia	Men's Triple Jump Indoor World Record Holder; March 14, 2010 – January 16, 2021	Succeeded by (Burkina Faso) Hugues Fabrice Zango
Preceded by (Sweden) Christian Olsson	Men's Triple Jump Indoor European Record Holder; March 14, 2010 – present	Succeeded by Incumbent
