= 2013 World Youth Championships in Athletics – Boys' triple jump =

Boys' triple jump at the 2013 World Youth Championships in Athletics
- Venue: RSC Olimpiyskiy
- Dates: 12 July (qualification); 13 July (final)
- Competitors: 32
- Winning distance: 16.63 CR

Medalists
gold medal	Lázaro Martínez	Cuba
silver medal	Fang Yaoqing	China
bronze medal	Dimitri Antonov	Germany

The boys' triple jump at the 2013 World Youth Championships in Athletics was held on 12 and 13 July.

== Medalists ==
Gold	Silver	Bronze
Lázaro Martínez; Cuba	Fang Yaoqing; China	Dimitri Antonov; Germany

== Records ==
Prior to the competition, the following records were as follows:

World Youth Best	Gu Junjie (CHN)	16.89	Guangzhou, China	25 August 2000
Championship Record	Héctor Dairo Fuentes (CUB)	16.63	Marrakesh, Morocco	16 July 2005
World Youth Leading	Lázaro Martínez (CUB)	16.53	Havana, Cuba	4 June 2013

== Qualification ==
Qualification rule: 15.30 (Q) or at least 12 best performers (q) qualified.

Rank	Group	Name	Nationality	#1	#2	#3	Result	Notes
1	A	KeAndre Bates	United States	x	x	15.70	15.70	Q, PB
2	B	Dimitri Antonov	Germany	15.64			15.64	Q, PB
3	B	Fang Yaoqing	China	15.27	15.63		15.63	Q
4	B	Simone Forte	Italy	15.62			15.62	Q, PB
5	A	Lázaro Martínez	Cuba	15.48			15.48	Q
5	B	Miguel van Assen	Suriname	15.48			15.48	Q, PB
7	A	Pavlo Beznis	Ukraine	15.37			15.37	Q
8	B	Max Heß	Germany	15.34			15.34	Q
9	B	Justin Donawa	Bermuda	15.06	15.07	15.31	15.31	Q, PB
10	B	Ioannis Giazitzoglou	Greece	15.23	15.23	x	15.23	q
11	B	Antonio Hernández	Mexico	15.21	14.49	x	15.21	q, PB
12	A	Oleksandr Malosilov	Ukraine	15.17	x	15.12	15.17	q
13	A	Ivan Solovyev	Kazakhstan	14.99	14.77	x	14.99	
14	B	Kaiwan Culmer	Bahamas	14.96	x	14.90	14.96	PB
15	B	Žan Frelih	Slovenia	x	14.92	x	14.92	PB
16	A	Clayton Brown	Jamaica	x	14.68	14.90	14.90	
17	A	O'Brien Wasome	Jamaica	14.47	14.37	14.90	14.90	
18	A	Jan Luxa	Slovenia	x	14.88	14.54	14.88	PB
19	A	Pavel Markin	Russia	13.22	14.85	14.68	14.85	
20	A	Khaled Al-Subaie	Kuwait	14.32	14.56	14.82	14.82	
21	A	Dave Pika	Suriname	14.70	x	x	14.70	PB
22	A	Felix Watmon	Uganda	14.47	x	14.66	14.66	
23	B	Timur Khusnulin	Uzbekistan	14.49	x	14.65	14.65	
24	A	Ong Yu Kai	Singapore	x	x	14.65	14.65	
25	A	Ryota Machiyama	Jamaica	14.33	14.45	14.63	14.63	
26	B	Ivan Samorodov	Kazakhstan	x	x	14.63	14.63	
27	B	Tobia Bocchi	Italy	x	14.59	14.44	14.59	
28	A	Julio Corozo	Ecuador	14.53	x	x	14.53	
29	B	Zhong Peifeng	China	x	x	14.45	14.45	
30	A	Theophilus Ejovi Uruemu	Nigeria	13.45	13.57	13.85	13.85	
31	B	Cem Şahin	Turkey	x	13.50	x	13.50	
	B	Yasser Triki	Algeria	x	x	–	NM	

== Final ==
Rank	Name	Nationality	#1	#2	#3	#4	#5	#6	Result	Notes
1st place, gold medalist(s)	Lázaro Martínez	Cuba	15.34	15.98	16.05	16.63	15.92	15.92	16.63	CR
2nd place, silver medalist(s)	Fang Yaoqing	China	15.57	16.19	16.48	16.12	15.08	16.13	16.48	PB
3rd place, bronze medalist(s)	Dimitri Antonov	Germany	14.91	16.02	x	15.51	x	13.41	16.02	PB
4	Oleksandr Malosilov	Ukraine	15.95	15.74	15.95	15.91	15.72	15.23	15.95	PB
5	Simone Forte	Italy	15.71	x	15.24	13.76	x	x	15.71	PB
6	Pavlo Beznis	Ukraine	15.36	15.70	15.60	x	15.70	x	15.70	PB
7	Justin Donawa	Bermuda	15.65	15.33	15.08	x	–	15.09	15.65	PB
8	Max Heß	Germany	x	x	15.52	14.97	x	15.49	15.52	PB
9	KeAndre Bates	United States	15.23	15.43	15.45				15.45	
10	Ioannis Giazitzoglou	Greece	15.21	15.29	x				15.29	
11	Antonio Hernández	Mexico	14.88	14.84	14.91				14.91	
	Miguel van Assen	Suriname	x	x					NM	
