= 2024 Balkan Athletics Championships =

- Dates: 25–26 May
- Host city: İzmir, Turkey
- Venue: İzmir Atatürk Stadium
- Level: Senior
- Events: 43

The 2024 Balkan Athletics Championships was the 77th edition of the annual track and field competition for athletes from the Balkans, organised by Balkan Athletics. It was held at the İzmir Atatürk Stadium on 25 and 26 May in İzmir, Turkey.

== Medal summary ==
=== Men ===
Event	Gold		Silver		Bronze	
100 metres (wind: +0.9 m/s)	Kayhan Özer (TUR)	10.17	Mustafa Kemal Ay (TUR)	10.18	Beppe Grillo (MLT)	10.23 NR
200 metres	Ramil Guliyev (TUR)	21.06	Boško Kijanović (SRB)	21.24	Sotirios Gkaragkanis (GRE)	21.34
400 metres	Rok Ferlan (SLO)	45.69	Boško Kijanović (SRB)	46.12	Sorin Alexandru Voinea (ROM)	46.25
800 metres	Marino Bloudek (CRO)	1:48.35	Jan Vukovič (SLO)	1:49.01	Oleh Myronets (UKR)	1:49.31
1500 metres	Mehmet Çelik (TUR)	3:42.66	Dmitriy Nikolaychuk (UKR)	3:44.41	Nicolae Coman (ROM)	3:44.67
3000 metres	Sebastian Frey (AUT)	7:52.14	David Nikolli (ALB)	8:07.37	Dorin Andrei Rusu (ROM)	8:08.29
5000 metres	Sebastian Frey (AUT)	13:35.95	Abdurrahman Gediklioğlu (TUR)	14:19.51	Ayetullah Aslanhan (TUR)	14:36.51
110 metres hurdles	Enzo Diessl (AUT)	13.48	Alin Ionuţ Anton (ROU)	13.59	Filip Jakob Demšar (SLO)	13.66
400 metres hurdles	Berke Akcam (TUR)	49.30	Nikola Kostić (SRB)	49.54	Ismail Nezir (TUR)	50.24
3000 metres Steeplechase	Tobias Rattinger (AUT)	8:36.72	Abdullah Tuğluk (TUR)	8:39.44	Turgay Bayram (TUR)	8:46.11
4 × 100 metres relay	Turkey; Mustafa Kemal Ay; Oğuz Uyar; Kayhan Özer; Ramil Guliyev	39.54	Greece; Ioannis Voskopoulos; Nikolaos Panagiotopoulos; Sotirios Gkaragkanis; Vasileos Myrianthopoulos	39.59	Malta; Jacob El Aida Chaffey; Graham Pellegrini; Luke Bezzina; Beppe Grillo	40.57 NR
4 × 400 metres relay	Ukraine; Danylo Danylenko; Yevhen Hutsol; Mykyta Rodchenkov; Oleksandr Pohorilko	3:07.16	Turkey; Yagiz Canlı; Oğuzhan Kaya; Sinan Ören; İlyas Çanakçı	3:08.10	Slovenia; Luka Janežič; Rok Markelj; Jan Vukovič; Rok Ferlan	3:08.24
High jump	Vladyslav Lavskyy (UKR)	2.23	Antonios Merlos (GRE)	2.20	Tihomir Ivanov (BUL)	2.15
Pole vault	Illya Kravchenko (UKR)	5.30	Ioannis Rizos (GRE)	5.30	Riccardo Klotz (AUT)	5.20
Long jump	Miltiadis Tentoglou (GRE)	8.17	Bozhidar Saraboyukov (BUL)	8.12	Nazim Babayev (AZE)	7.83
Triple jump	Necati Er (TUR)	16.78	Can Özüpek (TUR)	16.48	Dimitrios Tsiamis (GRE)	16.47
Shot put	Andrei Toader (ROM)	20.25	Asmir Kolašinac (SRB)	19.87	Artem Levchenko (UKR)	19.80
Discus Throw	Alin Firfirica (ROM)	61.90	Apostolos Parellis (CYP)	60.56	Martin Marković (CRO)	59.94
Hammer Throw	Özkan Baltacı (TUR)	75.19	Serghei Marghiev (MDA)	74.83	Kostadinos Zaltos (GRE)	74.33
Javelin Throw	Andrian Mardare (MDA)	81.68	Emin Öncel (TUR)	74.42	Muhammed Hanifi Zengin (TUR)	73.85
Decathlon	Angelos-Tzanis Andreoglou (GRE)	7926	Dragan Pešić (MNE)	6661	Batuhan Arda Erol (TUR)	6462
WR world record | AR area record | CR championship record | GR games record | NR national record | OR Olympic record | PB personal best | SB season best | WL world leading (in a given season)

=== Women ===
Event	Gold		Silver		Bronze	
100 metres (wind: +1.3 m/s)	Polyniki Emmanoulidou (GRE)	11.36	Olivia Fotopoulou (CYP)	11.39	Ivana Ilić (SRB)	11.43
200 metres	Olivia Fotopoulou (CYP)	23.60	Sıla Koloğlu (TUR)	23.73	Ivana Ilić (SRB)	23.89
400 metres	Mariana Shostak (UKR)	52.73	Tetyana Melnyk (UKR)	53.17	Maja Ćirić (SRB)	53.23
800 metres	Olha Lyakhova (UKR)	2:01.11	Dilek Koçak (TUR)	2:01.63	Nina Vuković (CRO)	2:01.72
1500 metres	Tuğba Toptaş (TUR)	4:12.83	Gamze Bulut (TUR)	4:13.44	Lenuta Simiuc (ROU)	4:16.02
3000 metres	Burcu Subatan (TUR)	9:09.80	Bahar Atalay (TUR)	9:21.37	Gresa Bakraqi (KOS)	9:35.44
5000 metres	Luiza Gega (ALB)	15:38.52	Emine Hatun Tuna (TUR)	15:42.48	Yasemin Can (TUR)	15:46.45
100 metres hurdles (wind: -0.2 m/s)	Natalia Christofi (CYP)	13.13	Nika Glojnarič (SLO)	13.16	Elisavet Pesiridou (GRE)	13.17
400 metres hurdles	Lena Pressler (AUT)	57.39	Dimitra Gnafaki (GRE)	57.50	Alexandra Ştefania Uţă (ROM)	57.77
3000 metres Steeplechase	Luiza Gega (ALB)	9:26.40	Derya Kunur (TUR)	9:45.69	Andreea Stavila (MDA)	9:52.90
4 × 100 metres relay	Greece; Artemis Anastasiou; Elisavet Pesiridou; Dimitra Tsoukala; Rafailia Spanoudaki-Hatziriga	44.11	Serbia; Katarina Vreta; Ivana Ilić; Anja Lukić; Milana Tirnanić	44.36	Ukraine; Diana Myroshnichenko; Hanna Karandukova; Iryna Bobrovska; Yuliya Klymiuk	45.24
4 × 400 metres relay	Ukraine; Mariana Shostak; Kateryna Klymiuk; Mariya Buryak; Tetyana Melnyk	3:31.36	Croatia; Anja Ramić; Nina Vuković; Natalija Švenda; Veronika Drljačić	3:36.67	Slovenia; Agata Zupin; Vika Rutar; Ajda Kaučič; Maja Pogorevc	3:36.93
High jump	Buse Savaşkan (TUR)	1.92	Mirela Demireva (BUL)	1.86	Panagiota Dosi (GRE)	1.83
Pole vault	Eleni-Klaoudia Polak (GRE)	4.60	Ariadni Adamamopoulou (GRE)	4.40	Buse Arıkazan-Çağlayan (TUR); Demet Parlak (TUR)	4.00
Long jump	Plamena Mitkova (BUL)	6.50	Florentina Costina Iusco (ROM)	6.49	Filippa Fotopoulou (CYP)	6.44
Triple jump	Tuğba Danışmaz (TUR)	14.59w	Aleksandra Nacheva (BUL)	14.23	Florentina Costina Iusco (ROU)	14.19w
Shot put	Emel Dereli (TUR)	18.00	Dimitriana Bezede (MDA)	16.84	Pınar Akyol (TUR)	16.52
Discus Throw	Marija Tolj (CRO)	61.17	Alexandra Emilianov (MDA)	60.56	Özlem Becerek (TUR)	57.80
Hammer Throw	Zalina Marghieva (MDA)	71.12	Stamatia Scarvelis (GRE)	67.36	Valentina Savva (CYP)	66.64
Javelin Throw	Eda Tuğsuz (TUR)	58.24	Elina Tzengko (GRE)	58.11	Esra Türkmen (TUR)	57.17
Heptathlon	Anastasia Dragomirova (GRE)	5426	Sofia Kamperidou (GRE)	5116	Leja Glojnarič (SLO)	5051
WR world record | AR area record | CR championship record | GR games record | NR national record | OR Olympic record | PB personal best | SB season best | WL world leading (in a given season)

=== Mixed ===
Event	Gold		Silver		Bronze	
4 × 400 metres relay	Serbia; Aleksandra Pešić (W); Miloš Marković (M); Maja Gajić (W); Nikola Kostić (M)	3:22.67	Turkey; Ihsan Selçuk (M); Büşra Barbaros (W); Oǧuzhan Kaya (M); Neslihan Toktaş (W)	3:25.49	Romania; Ioana Rebecca Andrei (W); Cristian Gabriel Voicu (M); Alexandra Ştefania Uţă (W); Sorin Alexandru Voinea (M)	3:25.65

== Medal table ==
* Host nation (Turkey)

Rank	Nation	Gold	Silver	Bronze	Total
1	Turkey*	13	13	11	37
2	Greece	6	8	5	19
3	Ukraine	6	2	3	11
4	Austria	5	0	1	6
5	Moldova	2	3	1	6
6	Romania	2	2	7	11
7	Cyprus	2	2	2	6
8	Croatia	2	1	2	5
9	Albania	2	1	0	3
10	Serbia	1	5	3	9
11	Bulgaria	1	3	1	5
12	Slovenia	1	2	4	7
13	Montenegro	0	1	0	1
14	Malta	0	0	2	2
15	Azerbaijan	0	0	1	1
15	Kosovo	0	0	1	1
Totals (16 entries)		43	43	44	130
