= 2017 European Athletics U23 Championships – Men's triple jump =

The men's triple jump event at the 2017 European Athletics U23 Championships was held in Bydgoszcz, Poland, at Zdzisław Krzyszkowiak Stadium on 15 and 16 July.

== Medalists ==
Gold	Nazim Babayev; Azerbaijan
Silver	Simo Lipsanen; Finland
Bronze	Max Heß; Germany

== Results ==
=== Qualification ===
15 July

Qualification rule: 15.75 (Q) or the 12 best results (q) qualified for the final.

Rank	Group	Name	Nationality	#1	#2	#3	Results	Notes
1	B	Max Heß	Germany	16.89			16.89	Q
2	A	Nazim Babayev	Azerbaijan	16.67			16.67	Q
3	A	Simo Lipsanen	Finland	16.42			16.42	Q
4	A	Tomáš Veszelka	Slovakia	16.21			16.21	Q
5	A	Oleksandr Malosilov	Ukraine	16.21w			16.01w	Q
6	A	Can Özüpek	Turkey	15.64	15.96		15.96	Q, PB
7	B	Samuele Cerro	Italy	15.89			15.89	Q
8	B	Necati Er	Turkey	15.87			15.87	Q
9	A	Plamen Petkov	Bulgaria	x	15.58	15.83	15.83	Q, PB
10	B	Simone Forte	Italy	15.07	15.79		15.79	Q
11	A	Goga Maglakelidze	Georgia	15.42	x	15.70	15.70	q
12	B	Philipp Kronsteiner	Austria	15.18	15.53	15.67	15.67	q
13	A	Levon Aghasyan	Armenia	x	15.62	x	15.62	
14	B	Marcos Ruiz	Spain	14.40	15.59	15.52	15.59	
15	B	Yaroslav Isachenkov	Ukraine	15.56	15.40	x	15.56	
16	A	Ihor Honchar	Ukraine	15.51	x	14.43	15.51	
17	B	Jiří Zeman	Czech Republic	15.01	x	x	15.01	
	B	Jesper Hellström	Sweden				DNS	

=== Final ===
16 July

Rank	Name	Nationality	#1	#2	#3	#4	#5	#6	Result	Notes
1st place, gold medalist(s)	Nazim Babayev	Azerbaijan	x	17.18	16.74	x	x	x	17.18	EL, PB
2nd place, silver medalist(s)	Simo Lipsanen	Finland	16.83	16.70	16.58	x	17.14	x	17.14	NR
3rd place, bronze medalist(s)	Max Heß	Germany	16.61	16.53	x	16.68	x	x	16.68	
4	Tomáš Veszelka	Slovakia	16.63	x	x	x	16.56	–	16.63	NU23R
5	Can Özüpek	Turkey	x	15.97	x	15.89	16.10	15.69	16.10	PB
6	Oleksandr Malosilov	Ukraine	15.84	15.99	15.88	15.53	15.61	15.47	15.99	
7	Samuele Cerro	Italy	x	x	15.97	14.94	x	x	15.97	
8	Simone Forte	Italy	15.91	x	15.91	x	14.30	15.95	15.95	SB
9	Necati Er	Turkey	15.06	15.82	15.41				15.82	
10	Plamen Petkov	Bulgaria	x	x	15.13				15.13	
11	Goga Maglakelidze	Georgia	x	15.01	x				15.01	
	Philipp Kronsteiner	Austria	x	x	x				NM	
