= 2019 European Athletics Indoor Championships – Men's triple jump =

The men's triple jump event at the 2019 European Athletics Indoor Championships was held on 1 March at 20:25 (qualification) and 3 March at 19:35 (final) local time.

== Medalists ==
Gold	Silver	Bronze
Nazim Babayev; Azerbaijan	Nelson Évora; Portugal	Max Heß; Germany

== Records ==
Standing records prior to the 2019 European Athletics Indoor Championships
World record	Teddy Tamgho (FRA)	17.92	Paris, France	6 March 2011
European record	Teddy Tamgho (FRA)	17.92	Paris, France	6 March 2011
Championship record	Teddy Tamgho (FRA)	17.92	Paris, France	6 March 2011
World Leading	Hugues Fabrice Zango (BUR)	17.58	Paris, France	27 January 2019
European Leading	Pedro Pablo Pichardo (POR)	17.32	Braga, Portugal	17 February 2019

== Results ==
=== Qualification ===
Qualification: Qualifying performance 16.70 (Q) or at least 8 best performers (q) advance to the Final

Rank	Athlete	Nationality	#1	#2	#3	Result	Note
1	Nelson Évora	Portugal	16.47	16.89		16.89	Q, SB
2	Max Heß	Germany	16.35	16.81		16.81	Q, SB
3	Nazim Babayev	Azerbaijan	16.81			16.81	Q, PB
4	Tomáš Veszelka	Slovakia	x	16.78		16.78	Q, PB
5	Kevin Luron	France	16.48	x	16.65	16.65	q, SB
6	Simone Forte	Italy	16.64	x	–	16.64	q
7	Yoann Rapinier	France	x	16.55	16.28	16.55	q
8	Nathan Douglas	Great Britain	16.10	16.48	–	16.48	q, SB
9	Simo Lipsanen	Finland	16.30	16.43	x	16.43	
10	Levon Aghasyan	Armenia	x	16.32	16.38	16.38	
11	Aleksey Fyodorov	Authorised Neutral Athletes	16.27	16.28	16.23	16.28	
12	Can Özüpek	Turkey	15.65	16.12	16.28	16.28	
13	Tobia Bocchi	Italy	16.23	x	x	16.23	
14	Necati Er	Turkey	x	16.10	16.21	16.21	
15	Pablo Torrijos	Spain	15.69	15.83	16.18	16.18	
16	Elvijs Misāns	Latvia	x	16.02	16.16	16.16	
17	Julian Reid	Great Britain	15.74	12.94	15.93	15.93	
18	Fabrizio Donato	Italy	15.61	15.93	x	15.93	
	Adrian Świderski	Poland				DNS	

=== Final ===
Rank	Athlete	Nationality	#1	#2	#3	#4	#5	#6	Result	Note
1st place, gold medalist(s)	Nazim Babayev	Azerbaijan	16.97	x	x	17.29	x	x	17.29	PB
2nd place, silver medalist(s)	Nelson Évora	Portugal	16.68	x	x	17.11	x	x	17.11	SB
3rd place, bronze medalist(s)	Max Heß	Germany	x	16.93	x	16.68	17.10	x	17.10	SB
4	Yoann Rapinier	France	x	16.72	15.66	15.71	x	x	16.72	
5	Kevin Luron	France	16.63	16.37	x	x	14.89	x	16.63	
6	Tomáš Veszelka	Slovakia	16.11	16.35	15.99	–	x	x	16.35	
7	Nathan Douglas	Great Britain	16.33	x	15.36	x	15.98	x	16.33	
8	Simone Forte	Italy	15.54	x	x	r	–	–	15.54	
