= 2022 World Athletics Indoor Championships – Men's triple jump =

Men's triple jump at the 2022 World Athletics Indoor Championships
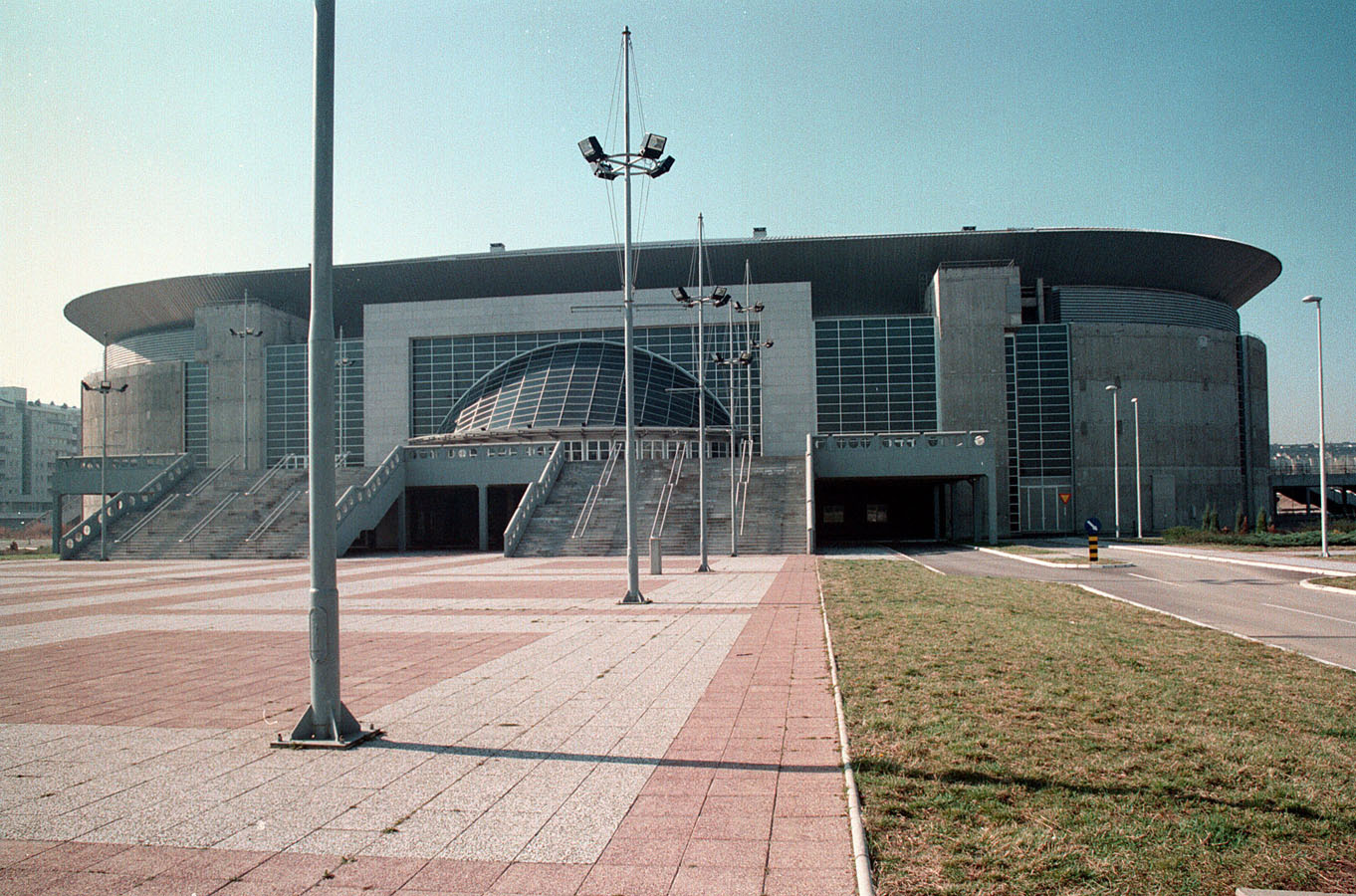
- Venue: Štark Arena
- Dates: 18 March
- Competitors: 12 from 10 nations
- Winning distance: 17.64

Medalists
gold medal	Lázaro Martínez	Cuba
silver medal	Pedro Pichardo	Portugal
bronze medal	Donald Scott	United States

The men's triple jump at the 2022 World Athletics Indoor Championships took place on 18 March 2022.

== Results ==
The final was started at 12:15.

Rank	Athlete	Nationality	#1	#2	#3	#4	#5	#6	Result	Notes
1st place, gold medalist(s)	Lázaro Martínez	Cuba	17.64	17.04	17.32	17.62	–	15.76	17.64	WL
2nd place, silver medalist(s)	Pedro Pichardo	Portugal	17.42	17.46	x	14.94	–	–	17.46	NR
3rd place, bronze medalist(s)	Donald Scott	United States	16.66	16.80	17.21	17.18	17.06	x	17.21	SB
4	Will Claye	United States	17.05	16.87	17.10	17.15	17.19	16.99	17.19	SB
5	Jah-Nhai Perinchief	Bermuda	x	16.36	16.95	x	16.59	x	16.95	SB
6	Melvin Raffin	France	16.48	15.76	x	14.82	x	16.68	16.68	
7	Jean-Marc Pontvianne	France	x	16.62	x	x	–	–	16.62	
8	Nazim Babayev	Azerbaijan	16.29	16.55	x	x	x	x	16.55	
9	Tiago Pereira	Portugal	x	16.05	16.46	Did not advance			16.46	
10	Yasser Triki	Algeria	15.24	16.42	13.57	Did not advance			16.42	
11	Alexsandro Melo	Brazil	16.07	x	x	Did not advance			16.07	
12	Nikolaos Andrikopoulos	Greece	16.05	x	15.74	Did not advance			16.05	
	Levon Aghasyan	Armenia	Did not start							
