= Lipsanen =

Lipsanen is a Finnish surname. Notable people with the surname include:

- Danny (born 1942, real name Ilkka Lipsanen), Finnish singer and guitarist
- Simo Lipsanen (born 1995), Finnish athlete
