= 2018 European Athletics Championships – Men's triple jump =

Men's triple jump at the 2018 European Athletics Championships
- Venue: Olympic Stadium
- Location: Berlin
- Dates: August 10 (qualification); August 12 (final)
- Competitors: 23 from 17 nations
- Winning distance: 17.10

Medalists
gold medal	Nelson Évora	Portugal
silver medal	Alexis Copello	Azerbaijan
bronze medal	Dimitrios Tsiamis	Greece

The men's triple jump at the 2018 European Athletics Championships took place at the Olympic Stadium on 10 and 12 August.

== Records ==
Standing records prior to the 2018 European Athletics Championships
World record	Jonathan Edwards (GBR)	18.29 m	Gothenburg, Sweden	7 August 1995
European record	Jonathan Edwards (GBR)	18.29 m	Gothenburg, Sweden	7 August 1995
Championship record	Jonathan Edwards (GBR)	17.99 m	Budapest, Hungary	23 August 1998
World Leading	Pedro Pablo Pichardo (POR)	17.95 m	Doha, Qatar	4 May 2018
European Leading	Pedro Pablo Pichardo (POR)	17.95 m	Doha, Qatar	4 May 2018

== Schedule ==
Date	Time	Round
10 August 2018	12:40	Qualification
12 August 2018	19:55	Final

All times are local times (UTC+2)

== Results ==
=== Qualification ===
Qualification: 16.75 m (Q) or best 12 performers (q)

Rank	Group	Name	Nationality	#1	#2	#3	Result	Note
1	A	Alexis Copello	Azerbaijan	16.82			16.82	Q
2	A	Pablo Torrijos	Spain	16.79			16.79	Q
3	B	Jean-Marc Pontvianne	France	16.77			16.77	Q
4	B	Dimitrios Tsiamis	Greece	16.17	16.39	16.69	16.69	q
5	A	Can Özüpek	Turkey	16.66	15.91	–	16.66	q
6	B	Nelson Évora	Portugal	16.62	x	x	16.62	q
7	A	Marcos Ruiz	Spain	x	x	16.59	16.59	q
8	B	Nathan Douglas	Great Britain	16.22	x	16.56	16.56	q, SB
9	B	Nazim Babayev	Azerbaijan	x	16.54	x	16.54	q
10	A	Simo Lipsanen	Finland	16.24	16.51	x	16.51	q
11	B	Harold Correa	France	16.43	15.48	15.58	16.43	q
12	B	Tomáš Veszelka	Slovakia	16.41	16.41	x	16.41	q
13	A	Simone Forte	Italy	15.77	15.81	16.35	16.35	
14	B	Levon Aghasyan	Armenia	16.34	16.19	16.25	16.34	
15	A	Max Heß	Germany	16.32	x	x	16.32	
16	A	Aleksey Fyodorov	Authorised Neutral Athletes	16.08	16.29	15.88	16.29	
17	B	Elvijs Misāns	Latvia	16.23	16.20	16.26	16.26	
18	B	Necati Er	Turkey	16.04	15.96	16.26	16.26	
19	A	Kevin Luron	France	16.25	x	16.24	16.25	
20	A	Fabrizio Donato	Italy	15.24	15.11	16.15	16.15	
21	A	Marian Oprea	Romania	x	x	15.93	15.93	
	A	Lasha Gulelauri	Georgia	x	x	x	NM	
	B	Karol Hoffmann	Poland	x	r	–	NM	
	B	Momchil Karailiev	Bulgaria				DNS	

=== Final ===
Rank	Athlete	Nationality	#1	#2	#3	#4	#5	#6	Result	Notes
1st place, gold medalist(s)	Nelson Évora	Portugal	x	16.55	16.86	16.87	17.10	x	17.10	SB
2nd place, silver medalist(s)	Alexis Copello	Azerbaijan	16.78	16.93	x	x	15.91	16.79	16.93	
3rd place, bronze medalist(s)	Dimitrios Tsiamis	Greece	16.55	x	16.78	16.48	x	16.13	16.78	SB
4	Nazim Babayev	Azerbaijan	x	x	16.66	16.17	x	16.76	16.76	
5	Pablo Torrijos	Spain	16.07	16.65	16.74	16.43	16.57	16.47	16.74	
6	Nathan Douglas	Great Britain	16.71	x	16.69	16.59	x	16.71	16.71	SB
7	Jean-Marc Pontvianne	France	x	16.42	16.61	16.58	x	16.59	16.61	
8	Tomáš Veszelka	Slovakia	16.48	x	16.29	16.26	x	x	16.48	
9	Simo Lipsanen	Finland	16.37	x	16.46				16.46	
10	Marcos Ruiz	Spain	x	x	16.44				16.44	
11	Harold Correa	France	x	x	16.33				16.33	
12	Can Özüpek	Turkey	15.74	15.88	15.82				15.88	
