= 2014 World Junior Championships in Athletics – Men's triple jump =

Key to notes
- WJR: World Junior Record
- CR: Championship Record
- WJL: World Junior Leading
- AJR: Area Junior Record
- NJR: National Junior Record
- PB: Personal Best
- SB: Season Best
- DNS: Did not start
- DNF: Did not finish
- NM: No mark

Key to results
- Q: Automatic qualification
- q: Qualified as best performer
- X: Fail

The men's triple jump events at the 2014 World Junior Championships in Athletics took place at Hayward Field in Eugene, Oregon, United States on 25 and 27 July 2014.

== Medalists ==
Gold	Lázaro Martínez; Cuba
Silver	Max Hess; Germany
Bronze	Mateus de Sá; Brazil

== Records ==
Prior to the competition, the existing world junior and championship records were as follows.

World Junior Record	Volker Mai (GDR)	17.50 m	Erfurt, East Germany	23 June 1985
Championship Record	Yoelbi Quesada (CUB)	17.04 m	Seoul, South Korea	19 September 1992
World Junior Leading	Lázaro Martínez (CUB)	17.24 m	Havana, Cuba	1 February 2014
Broken records during the 2014 World Junior Championships in Athletics
Championship Record	Lázaro Martínez (CUB)	17.13 m	Eugene, United States	27 July 2014

== Results ==
=== Qualification ===
Qualification: Standard 15.90 m (Q) or at least 12 best performers (q).

Rank	Group	Name	Nation	Result	Note
1	B	Lázaro Martínez	Cuba	16.63	Q
2	A	Andy Díaz	Cuba	16.38	Q, PB
3	A	Max Hess	Germany	16.37	Q
4	B	Ryoma Yamamoto	Japan	16.27	Q
5	B	Fang Yaoqing	China	16.20	Q
6	B	Levon Aghasyan	Armenia	16.16	Q
7	B	Mateus de Sá	Brazil	16.15	Q, PB
8	A	Lorenzo Dallavalle	Italy	15.99	Q
9	B	Álvaro Cortez	Chile	15.97	Q
10	A	Yugo Takahashi	Japan	15.92	Q, PB
11	A	Fabian Ime Edoki	Nigeria	15.75	q
12	A	Miguel van Assen	Suriname	15.71	q
13	B	Clayton Brown	Jamaica	15.37	
14	B	Tomáš Veszelka	Slovakia	15.33	
15	B	Simone Forte	Italy	15.31	
16	B	Tobias Hell	Germany	15.30	
17	A	Khaled al-Subaie	Kuwait	15.26	
18	A	Marcos Ruíz	Spain	15.22	
19	A	Hayden McClain	United States	15.09	
20	A	Odaine Lewis	Jamaica	15.01	
21	B	Orkhan Aslanov	Azerbaijan	14.92	
22	B	Moustapha Badji	Senegal	14.90	
23	A	Timur Khusnulin	Uzbekistan	14.84	
24	B	John Warren	United States	14.71	
—N/a	A	Bruno de Souza	Brazil	DNS	

=== Final ===
Summary:

Rank	Name	Nation	1	2	3	4	5	6	Result	Note
1st place, gold medalist(s)	Lázaro Martínez	Cuba	17.08	17.13	X	—	—	16.39	17.13	PB, CR
2nd place, silver medalist(s)	Max Hess	Germany	15.90	16.55	X	X	X	X	16.55	PB
3rd place, bronze medalist(s)	Mateus de Sá	Brazil	15.93	16.47	16.41	16.18	16.25	16.27	16.47	NJR
4	Andy Díaz	Cuba	X	15.88	16.35	15.72	15.97	16.43	16.43	
5	Levon Aghasyan	Armenia	14.48	16.17	X	15.82	16.10	16.28	16.28	
6	Fang Yaoqing	China	16.15	15.96	15.35	15.10	15.70	15.97	16.15	
7	Ryoma Yamamoto	Japan	15.54	15.81	15.89	15.62	X	X	15.89	
8	Álvaro Cortez	Chile	15.66	15.80	15.88	X	X	15.52	15.88	NJR
9	Yugo Takahashi	Japan	15.76	15.49	15.56	—N/a			15.76	
10	Lorenzo Dallavalle	Italy	15.54	X	13.60	—N/a			15.54	
11	Miguel van Assen	Suriname	15.51	15.27	13.66	—N/a			15.51	
12	Fabian Ime Edoki	Nigeria	X	15.37	15.46	—N/a			15.46	
