= 2020 South American Indoor Championships in Athletics – Results =

These are the full results of the 2020 South American Indoor Championships in Athletics which took place in Cochabamba, Bolivia, on 1 to 2 February at the Estadio de Atletismo del Gobierno Autónomo Municipal de Cochabamba.

== Men's results ==
=== 60 meters ===
1 February

Rank	Lane	Name	Nationality	Time	Notes
1st place, gold medalist(s)	5	Jeffrey Vanan	Suriname	6.80	
2nd place, silver medalist(s)	7	Rafael Vásquez	Venezuela	6.85	
3rd place, bronze medalist(s)	6	Franco Florio	Argentina	6.85	
4	3	Virjilio Griggs	Panama	6.86	
5	2	Mateo Edward	Panama	6.86	
6	4	Arnovis Dalmero	Colombia	6.90	
7	8	Tito Hinojosa	Bolivia	7.05	
8	1	Pablo Abán	Bolivia	7.15	

=== 200 meters ===
2 February

Rank	Lane	Name	Nationality	Time	Notes
1st place, gold medalist(s)	5	Virjilio Griggs	Panama	20.81	
2nd place, silver medalist(s)	6	Rafael Vásquez	Venezuela	21.34	
3rd place, bronze medalist(s)	4	Franco Florio	Argentina	21.89	
4	2	Tito Hinojosa	Bolivia	22.08	
5	3	Arturo Deliser	Panama	22.09	
6	1	Sebastián Vargas	Bolivia	22.51	

=== 400 meters ===
1 February

Rank	Lane	Name	Nationality	Time	Notes
1st place, gold medalist(s)	6	Elián Larregina	Argentina	47.52	NR
2nd place, silver medalist(s)	4	Marco Vilca	Peru	47.84	NR
3rd place, bronze medalist(s)	5	Anderson Henriques	Brazil	47.91	
4	3	Fernando Copa	Bolivia	48.06	NR

=== 800 meters ===
2 February

Rank	Name	Nationality	Time	Notes
1st place, gold medalist(s)	Lucirio Antonio Garrido	Venezuela	1:53.54	
2nd place, silver medalist(s)	Marco Vilca	Peru	1:54.11	NR
3rd place, bronze medalist(s)	Alejandro Peirano	Chile	1:54.52	
4	Limber Ciprian	Bolivia	1:59.06	
5	David Alborta	Bolivia	1:59.42	
6	Diego Lacamoire	Argentina	2:00.82	

=== 1500 meters ===
1 February

Rank	Name	Nationality	Time	Notes
	Matheus Pessoa*	Brazil	3:56.68	
1st place, gold medalist(s)	Federico Bruno	Argentina	3:56.88	
2nd place, silver medalist(s)	Santiago Catrofe	Uruguay	3:58.18	NR
3rd place, bronze medalist(s)	Yessy Apaza	Bolivia	4:00.36	
4	Erick Ruben Arando	Bolivia	4:00.85	
	Diego Lacamoire	Argentina	DNF	

=== 3000 meters ===
2 February

Rank	Name	Nationality	Time	Notes
1st place, gold medalist(s)	Juan Jorge González	Bolivia	8:31.90	
2nd place, silver medalist(s)	Erick Ruben Arando	Bolivia	8:41.17	
	Federico Bruno	Argentina	DNF	
	Santiago Catrofe	Uruguay	DNF	
	Leonardo Padovani*	Brazil	DNF	

=== 60 meters hurdles ===
1 February

Rank	Lane	Name	Nationality	Time	Notes
1st place, gold medalist(s)	5	Gabriel Constantino	Brazil	7.78	
2nd place, silver medalist(s)	7	Eduardo de Deus	Brazil	7.81	
3rd place, bronze medalist(s)	3	Agustín Carrera	Argentina	7.87	NR
4	4	William Rios	Panama	8.17	
5	6	Maurico Sandoval	Bolivia	8.18	NR
6	2	Camilo Acebey	Bolivia	8.49	

=== 4 × 400 meters relay ===
2 February

Rank	Nation	Athletes	Time	Notes
1st place, gold medalist(s)	Bolivia	Fernando Copa, Pablo Abán, Tito Hinojosa, Sebastián Vargas	3:25.61	
2nd place, silver medalist(s)	Argentina	Franco Florio, Maximiliano Díaz, Agustín Carrera, Elian Larregina	3:29.45	NR

=== High jump ===
2 February

Rank	Name	Nationality	2.00	2.05	2.10	2.13	2.16	2.19	2.22	2.25	2.28	Result	Notes
1st place, gold medalist(s)	Fernando Ferreira	Brazil	–	–	o	o	o	o	o	xo	xxx	2.25	
2nd place, silver medalist(s)	Eure Yáñez	Venezuela	–	–	o	–	o	xo	xxo	xxx		2.22	
3rd place, bronze medalist(s)	Thiago Moura	Brazil	o	o	o	o	o	xo	xxx			2.19	
4	Carlos Layoy	Argentina	–	o	o	–	o	xxx				2.16	NR
5	David Bosquez	Panama	o	xo	xxx							2.05	

=== Pole vault ===
2 February

Rank	Name	Nationality	5.00	5.35	5.50	5.65	Result	Notes
1st place, gold medalist(s)	Germán Chiaraviglio	Argentina	–	o	xxo	xxx	5.50	
	Pablo Zaffaroni	Argentina	xxx				NM	

=== Long jump ===
1 February

Rank	Name	Nationality	#1	#2	#3	#4	#5	#6	Result	Notes
1st place, gold medalist(s)	Alexsandro Melo	Brazil	7.82	8.08	x	x	x	x	8.08	
2nd place, silver medalist(s)	Leodan Torrealba	Venezuela	7.51	x	7.19	7.72	7.36	7.68	7.72	
3rd place, bronze medalist(s)	José Luis Mandros	Peru	7.72	x	x	7.63	x	x	7.72	
4	Arnovis Dalmero	Colombia	x	7.56	7.33	x	7.68	x	7.68	NR
5	Daniel Pineda	Chile	7.31	7.45	x	x	7.62	7.52	7.62	NR
6	Erick Suarez	Bolivia	7.31	6.92	7.06	7.26	x	6.76	7.31	NR
7	Adrian Alvarado	Panama	6.62	6.88	7.26	6.90	6.83	7.02	7.26	
8	Miguel van Assen	Suriname	6.90	7.06	7.25	–	–	–	7.25	NR
9	Federico Guerrero	Argentina	x	x	6.86				6.86	
	Miguel Ángel Alfaro	Bolivia	x	x	x				NM	

=== Triple jump ===
2 February

Rank	Name	Nationality	#1	#2	#3	#4	#5	#6	Result	Notes
1st place, gold medalist(s)	Alexsandro Melo	Brazil	x	17.08	x	x	x	17.10	17.10	
2nd place, silver medalist(s)	Mateus de Sá	Brazil	x	x	16.62	x	x	16.30	16.62	
3rd place, bronze medalist(s)	Maximiliano Díaz	Argentina	15.99	16.29	16.52	16.39	x	15.86	16.52	NR
4	Álvaro Cortez	Chile	15.85	16.13	14.89	16.30	16.26	16.22	16.30	NR
5	Leodan Torrealba	Venezuela	15.81	15.87	x	15.97	–	x	15.97	
6	Federico Guerrero	Argentina	15.07	15.55	14.92	15.22	–	x	15.55	
	Miguel Ángel Alfaro	Bolivia							DNS	
	Miguel van Assen	Suriname							DNS	
	Lucas Villaroel	Bolivia							DNS	

=== Shot put ===
1 February

Rank	Name	Nationality	#1	#2	#3	#4	#5	#6	Result	Notes
1st place, gold medalist(s)	Willian Dourado	Brazil	18.01	18.90	18.87	18.83	19.09	18.90	19.09	
2nd place, silver medalist(s)	Ignacio Carballo	Argentina	18.54	x	18.76	18.29	17.90	18.44	18.76	
3rd place, bronze medalist(s)	Aldo González	Bolivia	18.02	18.40	18.55	18.02	18.41	18.73	18.73	NR

== Women's results ==
=== 60 meters ===
1 February

Rank	Lane	Name	Nationality	Time	Notes
1st place, gold medalist(s)	4	Rosângela Santos	Brazil	7.34	
2nd place, silver medalist(s)	6	Natalia Linares	Colombia	7.42	AU18R, NR
3rd place, bronze medalist(s)	5	María Victoria Woodward	Argentina	7.51	
4	6	María Florencia Lamboglia	Argentina	7.54	
5	2	Alinny Delgadillo	Bolivia	7.64	
6	7	Guadalupe Torrez	Bolivia	7.80	
7	1	Giara Garate	Peru	7.93	

=== 200 meters ===
2 February

Rank	Lane	Name	Nationality	Time	Notes
	5	Thabata de Carvalho*	Brazil	23.95	
1st place, gold medalist(s)	3	Natalia Linares	Colombia	24.19	CR
2nd place, silver medalist(s)	4	María Fernanda Mackenna	Chile	24.24	
3rd place, bronze medalist(s)	6	Noelia Martínez	Argentina	24.41	NR
4	2	Guadalupe Torrez	Bolivia	25.34	
5	1	Leticia Arispe	Bolivia	25.90	

=== 400 meters ===
1 February

Rank	Lane	Name	Nationality	Time	Notes
1st place, gold medalist(s)	5	Tiffani Marinho	Brazil	53.34	
2nd place, silver medalist(s)	3	María Fernanda Mackenna	Chile	54.45	NR
3rd place, bronze medalist(s)	6	Geisa Coutinho	Brazil	54.75	
4	4	Noelia Martínez	Argentina	54.81	
5	2	Cecilia Gómez	Bolivia	55.76	
6	1	Lucía Sotomayor	Bolivia	57.29	

=== 800 meters ===
2 February

Rank	Name	Nationality	Time	Notes
1st place, gold medalist(s)	Déborah Rodríguez	Uruguay	2:14.14	
2nd place, silver medalist(s)	Mariana Borelli	Argentina	2:16.99	
3rd place, bronze medalist(s)	María Marascia	Colombia	2:17.98	
4	Nicole Vaca	Bolivia	2:20.68	
5	Nelly Mamani	Bolivia	2:20.91	

=== 1500 meters ===
1 February

Rank	Name	Nationality	Time	Notes
1st place, gold medalist(s)	María Pía Fernández	Uruguay	4:31.03	NR
2nd place, silver medalist(s)	Jhoselyn Camargo	Bolivia	4:34.94	
3rd place, bronze medalist(s)	Mariana Borelli	Argentina	4:38.29	
4	Edith Mamani	Bolivia	4:42.67	

=== 3000 meters ===
2 February

Rank	Name	Nationality	Time	Notes
1st place, gold medalist(s)	Jhoselyn Camargo	Bolivia	9:55.68	
2nd place, silver medalist(s)	Edith Mamani	Bolivia	10:00.72	
	María Pía Fernández	Uruguay	DNF	

=== 60 meters hurdles ===
1 February

Rank	Lane	Name	Nationality	Time	Notes
1st place, gold medalist(s)	3	María Ignacia Eguiguren	Chile	8.40	NR
2nd place, silver medalist(s)	5	María Florencia Lamboglia	Argentina	8.67	
3rd place, bronze medalist(s)	4	Diana Bazalar	Peru	8.85	
4	6	Danitza Avila	Bolivia	9.53	
5	7	Reimy Irvin	Panama	9.60	
6	2	Camila Jiménez	Bolivia	9.65	

=== 4 × 400 meters relay ===
2 February

Rank	Nation	Athletes	Time	Notes
1st place, gold medalist(s)	Bolivia	Lucía Sotomayor, Alinny Delgadillo, Leticia Arispe, Cecilia Gómez	4:00.77	

=== High jump ===
2 February

Rank	Name	Nationality	1.55	1.60	1.65	1.70	1.73	1.76	1.79	1.82	1.86	Result	Notes
1st place, gold medalist(s)	Valdileia Martins	Brazil	–	–	–	–	xo	o	o	xxo	xxx	1.82	
2nd place, silver medalist(s)	Lorena Aires	Uruguay	–	–	–	o	–	xo	xo	xxx		1.79	NR
3rd place, bronze medalist(s)	Betsabé Páez	Argentina	–	xo	o	o	o	xxx				1.73	
4	Carla Ríos	Bolivia	o	o	o	o	xxo	xxx				1.73	

=== Pole vault ===
1 February

Rank	Name	Nationality	3.60	3.80	3.90	4.00	4.10	Result	Notes
1st place, gold medalist(s)	Nicole Hein	Peru	–	o	–	o	xxx	4.00	NR
2nd place, silver medalist(s)	Juliana Campos	Brazil	o	o	–	xxx		3.80	

=== Long jump ===
1 February

Rank	Name	Nationality	#1	#2	#3	#4	#5	#6	Result	Notes
1st place, gold medalist(s)	Nathalee Aranda	Panama	x	6.58	x	6.30	–	–	6.58	NR
2nd place, silver medalist(s)	Aries Sánchez	Venezuela	x	6.44	6.33	6.45	6.45	6.50	6.50	
3rd place, bronze medalist(s)	Eliane Martins	Brazil	6.18	x	6.44	6.23	6.29	6.30	6.44	
4	Macarena Reyes	Chile	x	x	6.27	6.18	x	6.27	6.27	NR
5	Valeria Quispe	Bolivia	5.84	x	x	x	5.73	5.83	5.84	
6	Lindy García	Bolivia	5.43	5.48	5.35	5.48	x	x	5.48	
	Silvana Segura	Peru							DNS	

=== Triple jump ===
2 February

Rank	Name	Nationality	#1	#2	#3	#4	#5	#6	Result	Notes
	Gabriele dos Santos*	Brazil	13.55	x	x	13.92	13.73	x	13.92	
1st place, gold medalist(s)	Liuva Zaidívar	Ecuador	13.15	x	13.31	13.26	13.52	13.15	13.52	NR
2nd place, silver medalist(s)	Valeria Quispe	Bolivia	12.82	13.12	13.10	x	12.99	x	13.12	NR
3rd place, bronze medalist(s)	Silvana Segura	Peru	13.01	x	13.07	13.06	x	x	13.07	NR

=== Shot put ===
1 February

Rank	Name	Nationality	#1	#2	#3	#4	#5	#6	Result	Notes
1st place, gold medalist(s)	Geisa Arcanjo	Brazil	x	16.94	16.62	17.09	x	17.06	17.09	
2nd place, silver medalist(s)	Ivana Gallardo	Chile	16.44	x	16.14	16.53	15.93	x	16.53	
