= Tuğluk =

Tuğluk is a Turkish surname. It may refer to:

- Abdullah Tuğluk (born 1999), Turkish long-distamce runner
- Aysel Tuğluk (born 1965), Turkish female politician
