= 2022 European Athletics Championships – Men's triple jump =

Men's triple jump at the 2022 European Athletics Championships
- Venue: Olympiastadion
- Location: Munich
- Dates: 15 August (qualification); 17 August (final)
- Competitors: 24 from 15 nations
- Winning distance: 17.50

Medalists
gold medal	Pedro Pichardo	Portugal
silver medal	Andrea Dallavalle	Italy
bronze medal	Jean-Marc Pontvianne	France

The men's triple jump at the 2022 European Athletics Championships took place at the Olympiastadion on 15 and 16 August.

== Records ==
Standing records prior to the 2022 European Athletics Championships
World record	Jonathan Edwards (GBR)	18.29 m	Gothenburg, Sweden	7 August 1995
European record	Jonathan Edwards (GBR)	18.29 m	Gothenburg, Sweden	7 August 1995
Championship record	Jonathan Edwards (GBR)	17.99 m	Budapest, Hungary	23 August 1998
World Leading	Pedro Pichardo (POR)	17.95 m	Eugene, United States	23 July 2022
Europe Leading	Pedro Pichardo (POR)	17.95 m	Eugene, United States	23 July 2022

== Schedule ==
Date	Time	Round
15 August 2022	20:05	Qualification
17 August 2022	20:15	Final

All times are local times (UTC+2)

== Results ==
=== Qualification ===
Qualification: 16.95 m (Q) or best 12 performers (q)

Rank	Group	Name	Nationality	#1	#2	#3	Result	Note
1	A	Pedro Pichardo	Portugal	16.89	17.36		17.36	Q
2	B	Emmanuel Ihemeje	Italy	17.20			17.20	Q
3	A	Jean-Marc Pontvianne	France	x	16.96		16.96	Q
4	B	Andrea Dallavalle	Italy	16.83	–	–	16.83	q
5	B	Marcos Ruiz	Spain	15.91	x	16.76	16.76	q
6	B	Enzo Hodebar	France	16.70	x	–	16.70	q
7	A	Tobia Bocchi	Italy	15.99	16.55	r	16.55	q
8	A	Ben Williams	Great Britain	15.56	16.47	x	16.47	q
9	A	Răzvan Cristian Grecu	Romania	x	x	16.44	16.44	q
10	B	Tiago Pereira	Portugal	x	16.36	x	16.36	q
11	A	Pablo Torrijos	Spain	16.09	16.12 w	r	16.12 w	q
12	B	Jesper Hellström	Sweden	15.66	16.07	16.06	16.07	q
13	B	Georgi Nachev	Bulgaria	x	15.84	16.04 w	16.04 w	
14	A	Levon Aghasyan	Armenia	x	16.03	15.65	16.03	
15	B	Dimitrios Tsiamis	Greece	15.42	15.97	15.99	15.99	
16	B	Adrian Świderski	Poland	x	15.72	15.97	15.97	
17	A	Simo Lipsanen	Finland	15.79	x	15.93	15.93	
18	B	Andreas Pantazis	Greece	15.72	15.86	15.86 w	15.86	
19	A	Nikolaos Andrikopoulos	Greece	x	15.19 w	15.39	15.39	
20	A	Benjamin Compaoré	France	x	x	15.17	15.17	
	A	Nazim Babayev	Azerbaijan	x	r		NM	
	B	Alexis Copello	Azerbaijan	x	x	x	NM	
	B	Necati Er	Turkey	x	–	r	NM	
	A	Tibor Galambos	Hungary	x	x	x	NM	

=== Final ===
Rank	Name	Nationality	#1	#2	#3	#4	#5	#6	Result	Note
1st place, gold medalist(s)	Pedro Pichardo	Portugal	17.05	17.50	x	–	–	x	17.50	
2nd place, silver medalist(s)	Andrea Dallavalle	Italy	x	x	16.81	x	17.04	x	17.04	
3rd place, bronze medalist(s)	Jean-Marc Pontvianne	France	x	x	16.94	x	x	x	16.94	
4	Tobia Bocchi	Italy	16.34	16.70	x	x	16.79	16.37	16.79	
5	Marcos Ruiz	Spain	x	16.78	16.48	x	x	16.77	16.78	
6	Ben Williams	Great Britain	16.66	x	x	16.47	x	16.53	16.66	
7	Enzo Hodebar	France	16.62	16.61	x	x	15.24	x	16.62	
8	Tiago Pereira	Portugal	x	16.56	16.59	16.60	x	x	16.60	
9	Emmanuel Ihemeje	Italy	x	16.55	16.30				16.55	
10	Jesper Hellström	Sweden	16.02	14.90	16.23				16.23	SB
	Răzvan Cristian Grecu	Romania	x	r					NM	
	Pablo Torrijos	Spain	x	x	x				NM	
