= Athletics at the 2019 Summer Universiade – Men's triple jump =

The men's triple jump event at the 2019 Summer Universiade was held on 9 and 10 July at the Stadio San Paolo in Naples.

== Medalists ==
Gold	Silver	Bronze
Nazim Babayev; Azerbaijan	Mateus de Sá; Brazil	Alexsandro Melo; Brazil

== Results ==
=== Qualification ===
Qualification: 16.50 m (Q) or at least 12 best (q) qualified for the final.

Rank	Group	Name	Nationality	#1	#2	#3	Result	Notes
1	A	Alexsandro Melo	Brazil	16.37	x	16.45	16.45	q
2	B	Liu Mingxuan	China	16.08	16.44	–	16.44	q
3	B	Nazim Babayev	Azerbaijan	16.15	x	16.36	16.36	q
4	B	Levon Aghasyan	Armenia	16.25	16.19	16.27	16.27	q
5	B	Darrel Jones	United States	x	x	16.19	16.19	q, PB
6	A	Can Özüpek	Turkey	15.94	16.16	x	16.16	q
7	B	Shemaiah James	Australia	15.77	x	15.85	15.85	q
8	B	Mateus de Sá	Brazil	14.40	x	15.83	15.83	q
9	A	Samuele Cerro	Italy	15.51	15.76	15.27	15.76	q
10	A	Tuomas Kaukolahti	Finland	15.75	15.60	15.66	15.75	q
11	B	Cristi Nicusor Boboc	Romania	x	15.73	15.67	15.73	q
12	B	Praveen Chithravel	India	15.35	15.65	15.71	15.73	q
13	A	Julian Konle	Australia	15.62	15.67	x	15.67	
14	B	Mohammed Hammadi	Morocco	15.43	15.65	15.28	15.65	
15	B	Jannick Bagge	Denmark	14.45	x	15.28	15.28	PB
16	A	Jean-Claude Roamba	Burkina Faso	x	15.19	x	15.19	
17	B	Jay Pradeep Shah	India	14.55	14.94	15.17	15.17	
18	A	Dominykas Petrosevičius	Lithuania	14.59	x	15.12	15.12	SB
19	A	Brian Obonna	Canada	x	15.06	?	15.06	
20	A	Longinos Achilleos	Cyprus	15.03	x	14.92	15.03	
21	B	Artur Engstrom	Sweden	14.66	14.92	x	14.92	
22	A	Yorai Shaoul	Israel	x	14.79	x	14.79	
23	A	Marius Bull Hjeltnes	Norway	14.74	14.77	x	14.77	
24	B	José Emmanuel Álvarez	Argentina	x	x	14.59	14.59	
25	A	Wong Chun Wing	Hong Kong	x	13.90	x	13.90	
	B	Venilaan Sebastian Mark	Sri Lanka	x	x	x	NM	
	A	Ivan Denisov	Uzbekistan				DNS	
	A	Obrey Chabala	Zambia				DNS	
	B	Raymond Nkwemy Tchomfa	Cameroon				DNS	

=== Final ===
Official Video

Rank	Name	Nationality	#1	#2	#3	#4	#5	#6	Result	Notes
1st place, gold medalist(s)	Nazim Babayev	Azerbaijan	x	x	16.58	x	x	16.89	16.89	
2nd place, silver medalist(s)	Mateus de Sá	Brazil	15.48	x	16.21	16.36	16.23	16.57	16.57	SB
3rd place, bronze medalist(s)	Alexsandro Melo	Brazil	15.88	16.02	x	x	x	16.57	16.57	
4	Can Özüpek	Turkey	x	15.88	16.28	16.38	x	16.56	16.56	
5	Liu Mingxuan	China	16.16	16.23	13.89	16.32	16.15	16.29	16.32	
6	Samuele Cerro	Italy	15.79	16.25	15.94	16.10	16.06	14.97	16.25	
7	Tuomas Kaukolahti	Finland	15.49	16.00	x	x	15.82	15.75	16.00	
8	Praveen Chithravel	India	15.71	15.96	15.62	15.46	13.49	15.81	15.96	
9	Shemaiah James	Australia	x	15.58	15.73				15.73	
10	Levon Aghasyan	Armenia	15.73	x	x				15.73	
11	Darrel Jones	United States	x	15.64	x				15.64	
12	Cristi Nicusor Boboc	Romania	15.60	x	15.06				15.60	
