= 2015 European Athletics U23 Championships – Men's triple jump =

The men's triple jump event at the 2015 European Athletics U23 Championships was held in Tallinn, Estonia, at Kadriorg Stadium on 11 and 12 July.

== Medalists ==
| Gold | Dmitriy Chizhikov; Russia |
| Silver | Georgi Tsonov; Bulgaria |
| Bronze | Ilya Potaptsev; Russia |

== Results ==
=== Final ===
12 July

| Rank | Name | Nationality | Attempts | | | | | | Result | Notes |
| Rank | Name | Nationality | 1 | 2 | 3 | 4 | 5 | 6 | Result | Notes |
|---|---|---|---|---|---|---|---|---|---|---|
| 1st place, gold medalist(s) | Dmitriy Chizhikov | Russia | 17.05 (w: -0.7 m/s) | 14.16 (w: 0.0 m/s) | x (w: +2.0 m/s) | 17.00 (w: -0.7 m/s) | 16.86 (w: -0.8 m/s) | 17.04 (w: 0.0 m/s) | 17.05 (w: -0.7 m/s) | |
| 2nd place, silver medalist(s) | Georgi Tsonov | Bulgaria | x (w: -0.3 m/s) | x (w: +0.2 m/s) | 16.40 (w: +0.1 m/s) | x (w: -0.6 m/s) | 16.28 (w: -0.3 m/s) | 16.77 (w: -0.2 m/s) | 16.77 (w: -0.2 m/s) | PB |
| 3rd place, bronze medalist(s) | Ilya Potaptsev | Russia | 15.37 (w: -0.7 m/s) | 15.72 (w: -1.5 m/s) | 16.12 (w: +1.1 m/s) | x (w: -0.3 m/s) | 16.34 (w: -0.6 m/s) | 16.46 (w: +0.9 m/s) | 16.46 (w: 0.9 m/s) | |
| 4 | Lasha Torgvaidze | Georgia | 16.33 (w: +1.0 m/s) | 16.06 (w: -0.7 m/s) | 15.96 (w: +0.3 m/s) | 16.30 (w: +0.4 m/s) | 16.17 (w: -0.7 m/s) | x (w: +1.0 m/s) | 16.33 (w: 1.0 m/s) | |
| 5 | Tomáš Veszelka | Slovakia | 16.31 (w: -0.8 m/s) | 16.24 (w: +0.1 m/s) | x (w: -1.1 m/s) | x (w: +0.3 m/s) | 16.24 (w: -1.9 m/s) | 16.13 (w: 0.0 m/s) | 16.31 (w: -0.8 m/s) | NUR PB |
| 6 | Alexandro Ionu Mitirica | Romania | x (w: +1.1 m/s) | 16.02 (w: +0.1 m/s) | x (w: +1.2 m/s) | x (w: -1.1 m/s) | 16.07 (w: +0.3 m/s) | x (w: +0.1 m/s) | 16.07 (w: 0.3 m/s) | PB |
| 7 | Simo Lipsanen | Finland | x (w: -1.0 m/s) | 16.01 (w: +0.1 m/s) | x (w: +0.9 m/s) | x (w: +0.2 m/s) | 16.02 (w: +0.3 m/s) | x (w: -0.8 m/s) | 16.02 (w: 0.3 m/s) | |
| 8 | Levon Aghasyan | Armenia | 15.17 (w: -1.5 m/s) | 15.88 (w: -1.0 m/s) | 15.64 (w: -0.3 m/s) | x (w: +0.6 m/s) | x (w: 0.0 m/s) | x (w: +1.0 m/s) | 15.88 (w: -1.0 m/s) | |
| 9 | Kristian Pulli | Finland | 15.84 (w: -0.9 m/s) | x (w: -0.4 m/s) | 15.83 (w: +0.5 m/s) | | | | 15.84 (w: -0.9 m/s) | |
| 10 | Tuomas Kaukolahti | Finland | x (w: -0.3 m/s) | 15.63 (w: -1.2 m/s) | 15.64 (w: -1.2 m/s) | | | | 15.64 (w: -1.2 m/s) | |
| 11 | Pavel Moravenov | Bulgaria | x (w: +0.4 m/s) | 15.42 (w: -0.2 m/s) | x (w: -0.7 m/s) | | | | 15.42 (w: -0.2 m/s) | |
| 12 | Marcel Kornhardt | Germany | x (w: -0.2 m/s) | 15.40 (w: -0.3 m/s) | 15.36 (w: +1.1 m/s) | | | | 15.40 (w: -0.3 m/s) | |

=== Qualifications ===
11 July

| Rank | Name | Nationality | Attempts | | | Result | Notes |
| Rank | Name | Nationality | 1 | 2 | 3 | Result | Notes |
|---|---|---|---|---|---|---|---|
| 1 | Dmitriy Chizhikov | Russia | 17.08 (w: +1.2 m/s) | | | 17.08 (w: 1.2 m/s) | Q |
| 2 | Georgi Tsonov | Bulgaria | 15.07 (w: +2.4 m/s) | 15.84 (w: +0.9 m/s) | 16.44 (w: +1.6 m/s) | 16.44 (w: 1.6 m/s) | Q |
| 3 | Ilya Potaptsev | Russia | x (w: +2.5 m/s) | 16.25 (w: +0.3 m/s) | | 16.25 (w: 0.3 m/s) | Q |
| 4 | Tomáš Veszelka | Slovakia | 16.19 (w: +1.7 m/s) | | | 16.19 (w: 1.7 m/s) | PB Q |
| 5 | Lasha Torgvaidze | Georgia | 16.18 (w: +1.8 m/s) | | | 16.18 (w: 1.8 m/s) | Q |
| 6 | Simo Lipsanen | Finland | 15.97 (w: +1.6 m/s) | 16.10 (w: +1.9 m/s) | | 16.10 (w: 1.9 m/s) | q |
| 7 | Levon Aghasyan | Armenia | 15.59 (w: +1.8 m/s) | 15.12 (w: +1.3 m/s) | 16.06 w (w: 2.1 m/s) | 16.06 w (w: 2.1 m/s) | q |
| 8 | Kristian Pulli | Finland | 15.96 (w: +1.0 m/s) | 16.01 (w: +1.1 m/s) | | 16.01 (w: 1.1 m/s) | =SB q |
| 9 | Marcel Kornhardt | Germany | 15.98 w (w: +3.8 m/s) | 15.79 (w: -0.1 m/s) | 15.83 (w: +0.3 m/s) | 15.98 w (w: 3.8 m/s) | q |
| 10 | Tuomas Kaukolahti | Finland | x (w: +3.6 m/s) | 15.81 (w: +0.8 m/s) | 15.97 (w: +0.6 m/s) | 15.97 (w: 0.6 m/s) | PB q |
| 11 | Alexandro Ionu Mitirica | Romania | 15.49 (w: +1.3 m/s) | 15.91 (w: +1.2 m/s) | 15.96 (w: +0.5 m/s) | 15.96 (w: 0.5 m/s) | q |
| 12 | Pavel Moravenov | Bulgaria | 15.88 (w: +1.5 m/s) | x (w: +1.2 m/s) | 15.36 (w: +0.5 m/s) | 15.88 (w: 1.5 m/s) | PB q |
| 13 | Jean-Marc Pontvianne | France | 15.86 (w: +1.5 m/s) | x (w: +1.0 m/s) | 15.57 (w: +0.7 m/s) | 15.86 (w: 1.5 m/s) | |
| 14 | Vladislav Poluboyarov | Russia | 15.12 (w: +3.4 m/s) | 15.68 (w: +1.4 m/s) | 15.71 (w: +1.7 m/s) | 15.71 (w: 1.7 m/s) | |
| 15 | Orkhan Aslanov | Azerbaijan | 15.35 (w: +2.0 m/s) | 15.68 (w: +1.9 m/s) | 15.39 (w: +1.3 m/s) | 15.68 (w: 1.9 m/s) | |
| 16 | Íñigo Uribarren | Spain | 14.63 (w: +0.7 m/s) | 15.47 (w: +0.7 m/s) | 15.66 (w: +1.0 m/s) | 15.66 (w: 1.0 m/s) | |
| 17 | Musa Tüzen | Turkey | 15.64 (w: +1.5 m/s) | 15.47 (w: +4.7 m/s) | 15.38 (w: -0.1 m/s) | 15.64 (w: 1.5 m/s) | |
| 18 | Riccardo Appoloni | Italy | 15.59 (w: +0.8 m/s) | 15.56 (w: +2.6 m/s) | 15.39 (w: +0.8 m/s) | 15.59 (w: 0.8 m/s) | SB |
| 19 | Andriy Stanchev | Ukraine | 15.56 w (w: +2.4 m/s) | 15.23 (w: +2.2 m/s) | 15.46 (w: +0.1 m/s) | 15.56 w (w: 2.4 m/s) | |
| 20 | Antonino Trio | Italy | x (w: +1.9 m/s) | 15.26 (w: +0.7 m/s) | 15.28 (w: +0.8 m/s) | 15.28 (w: 0.8 m/s) | |

== Participation ==
According to an unofficial count, 20 athletes from 14 countries participated in the event.

- Armenia (1)
- Azerbaijan (1)
- Bulgaria (2)
- Finland (3)
- France (1)
- Georgia (1)
- Germany (1)
- Italy (2)
- Romania (1)
- Russia (3)
- Slovakia (1)
- Spain (1)
- Turkey (1)
- Ukraine (1)
