= Can Özüpek =

Turkish triple jumper (born 1996)

Personal information
- Nationality: Turkish
- Born: 2 February 1996 (age 30) Balıkesir, Turkey

Sport
- Sport: Athletics
- Event: Triple jump
- Club: Enka SK
Medal record
Men's athletics
Representing Turkey
European Team Championships
Silver medal – second place	2025 Maribor	Triple jump
Mediterranean Games
Bronze medal – third place	2026 Taranto	Triple jump
Balkan Championships
Silver medal – second place	2024 İzmir	Triple jump
Bronze medal – third place	2023 Kraljevo	Triple jump
Balkan Indoor Championships
Bronze medal – third place	2025 Belgrade	Triple jump
Gold medal – first place	2024 Istanbul	Triple jump
Bronze medal – third place	2019 Istanbul	Triple jump
Tournaments
Bronze medal – third place	2025 Val-de-Reull	Triple jump
Mediterranean U23 Championships
Bronze medal – third place	2018 Jesolo	Triple jump NRU23

Can Özüpek (born 2 February 1996) is a Turkish triple jumper. He is the holder of Turkish records in U23 and triple jump.

== Personal life ==
Can Özüpek was born in Balıkesir, Turkey on 2 February 1996. He studied at the College for Physical Education and Sports at Balıkesir University.

== Sport career ==
Özüpek is a member of Enka SK in Istanbul, where he is coached by Fausto Riberio.

=== 2017 ===
By triple jumping his personal best of 16.10 m, he finished fifth at the 2017 European U23 Championships in Bydgoszcz, Poland.

=== 2018 ===
He placed twelfth with his 15.88 m triple jump at the 2018 European Championships in Berlin, Germany. He received the bronze medal in the triple jump with 16.39 m at the 2018 Mediterranean Athletics U23 Championships in Jesolo, Italy, and set a new Turkish U23 recotd. His personal best jump is 16.77 m, achieved in July 2018 in Bursa.

=== 2019 ===
In February 2019, Özüpek set a new Turkish record of indoor triple jump with 16.62 m, increasing the mark by about one cm, at the Turkish Athletics Indoor Championships in Istanbul, Turkey. He took the bronze medal in the triple jump with 16.21 m at the 2019 Balkan Athletics Indoor Championships in Istanbul, Turkey. He ranked fourth at the 2019 Summer Universiade. He also competed at the 2019 European Indoor Championships, without reaching the final.

=== 2023 ===
In 2023, he took the bronze medal in the triple jump with 16.18 m at the Balkan Championships in Kraljevo, Serbia.

=== 2024 ===
Özüpek captured the gold medal in the triple jump with 16.48 m at the 2024 Balkan Athletics Indoor Championships in Istanbul, Turkey. At the 2024 Balkan Athletics Championships in İzmir, Turkey, he reached to the silver medal in the triple jump with 16.48 m. His 16.23 m triple jump placed him in the tenth place in the final at the 2024 European Athletics Championships in Rome, Italy.

=== 2025 ===
In February 2025, he took the bronze medal in the triple jump event with 16.37 m at the Meeting de L'Eure in Val-de-Reuil, France. He received the bronze medal jumping 16.09 m at the 2025 Balkan Athletics Indoor Championships in Belgrade, Serbia. At the 2025 European Athletics Indoor Championships in Apeldoorn, Netherlands, he placed seventh in the triple jump event with 16.29 m. He won the silver medal in the triple jump event with 16.25 m at the 2025 European Athletics Team Championships Second Division in Maribor, Slovenia. He contributed to his team's record with 15 points.
