= Miguel van Assen =

Surinamese athlete

Personal information
- Born: Miguel Uriel van Assen; 30 July 1997 (age 28)
- Height: 1.85 m (6 ft 1 in)
- Weight: 71 kg (157 lb)

Sport
- Sport: Athletics
- Event: Triple jump

Miguel Uriel van Assen (born 30 July 1997) is a Surinamese athlete specializing in the triple jump. He won the gold medal at the 2017 South American Championships. In addition, he won multiple medals in age-group competitions, including the gold at the 2014 Summer Youth Olympic Games.

His personal best in the event is 16.94 metres set in Asunción in 2017. This is the current national record.

== International competitions ==
Year	Competition	Venue	Position	Event	Notes
Representing Suriname
2012	CARIFTA Games (U17)	Hamilton, Bermuda	6th	High jump	1.85 m
2012	CARIFTA Games (U17)	Hamilton, Bermuda	2nd^{1}	Triple jump	14.57 m
2013	CARIFTA Games (U17)	Nassau, Bahamas	1st	High jump	2.03 m
2013	CARIFTA Games (U17)	Nassau, Bahamas	1st	Triple jump	15.19 m
2013	World Youth Championships	Donetsk, Ukraine	5th (q)	Triple jump	15.48 m^{2}
2014	South American Games	Santiago, Chile	10th	Long jump	7.20 m
2014	South American Games	Santiago, Chile	4th	Triple jump	15.54 m
2014	CARIFTA Games (U20)	Fort-de-France, Martinique	3rd	Long jump	7.12 m
2014	CARIFTA Games (U20)	Fort-de-France, Martinique	1st	Triple jump	16.33 m
2014	Central American and Caribbean; Junior Championships (U18)	Morelia, Mexico	1st	Triple jump	16.01 m
2014	World Junior Championships	Eugene, United States	11th	Triple jump	15.51 m
2014	Youth Olympic Games	Nanjing, China	1st	Triple jump	16.15 m
2015	CARIFTA Games (U20)	Basseterre, Saint Kitts and Nevis	1st	Triple jump	16.24 m
2015	Pan American Games	Toronto, Canada	7th	Triple jump	16.25 m
2016	CARIFTA Games (U20)	St. George's, Grenada	1st	Long jump	7.66 m
2016	World U20 Championships	Bydgoszcz, Poland	8th	Triple jump	15.75 m
2017	Islamic Solidarity Games	Baku, Azerbaijan	2nd	Long jump	7.63 m
2017	Islamic Solidarity Games	Baku, Azerbaijan	3rd	Triple jump	16.64 m
2017	South American Championships	Asunción, Paraguay	1st	Triple jump	16.94 m
2017	World Championships	London, United Kingdom	23rd (q)	Triple jump	16.38 m
2018	South American Games	Cochabamba, Bolivia	1st	Triple jump	16.81 m
2018	Central American and Caribbean Games	Barranquilla, Colombia	3rd	Triple jump	16.96 m
2019	South American Championships	Lima, Peru	3rd	Triple jump	16.11 m
2020	South American Indoor Championships	Cochabamba, Bolivia	8th	Long jump	7.25 m
2021	South American Championships	Guayaquil, Ecuador	3rd	Triple jump	16.73 m (w)

^{1}Out of competition performance
^{2}No mark in the final

== Personal bests ==
- High jump – 2.03 (Nassau 2013)
- Long jump – 7.66 (+0.3 m/s, St. Georges 2016)
- Triple jump – 16.94 (+2.0 m/s, Asunción 2017) national record
