= 2024 European Athletics Championships – Men's triple jump =

Men's triple jump at the 2024 European Athletics Championships
- Venue: Stadio Olimpico
- Location: Rome
- Dates: 9 June (qualification); 11 June (final)
- Competitors: 28 from 16 nations
- Winning distance: 18.18 CR

Medalists
gold medal	Jordan Díaz	Spain
silver medal	Pedro Pichardo	Portugal
bronze medal	Thomas Gogois	France

The men's triple jump at the 2024 European Athletics Championships took place at the Stadio Olimpico on 9 and 11 June.

== Records ==
Standing records prior to the 2024 European Athletics Championships
World record	Jonathan Edwards (GBR)	18.29 m	Gothenburg, Sweden	7 August 1995
European record	Jonathan Edwards (GBR)	18.29 m	Gothenburg, Sweden	7 August 1995
Championship record	Jonathan Edwards (GBR)	17.99 m	Budapest, Hungary	23 August 1998
World Leading	Jaydon Hibbert (JAM)	17.75 m	Kingston, Jamaica	1 June 2024
Europe Leading	Andy Díaz Hernández (ITA)	17.61 m	Toruń, Poland	6 February 2024

== Schedule ==
Date	Time	Round
9 June 2024	10:45	Qualification
11 June 2024	20:55	Final

All times are local times (UTC+2)

== Results ==
=== Qualification ===
Qualification: 16.65 m (Q) or best 12 performers (q). Tobia Bocchi from Italy was advanced to the final by referee after protest.

Rank	Group	Name	Nationality	#1	#2	#3	Result	Note
1	A	Jordan Díaz	Spain	x	17.52		17.52	Q
2	B	Pedro Pichardo	Portugal	17.48			17.48	Q
3	B	Emmanuel Ihemeje	Italy	16.98			16.98	Q
4	A	Tiago Pereira	Portugal	16.83			16.83	Q
4	B	Max Heß	Germany	16.83			16.83	Q
6	A	Thomas Gogois	France	16.64	16.75		16.75	Q
7	A	Jean-Marc Pontvianne	France	x	16.75		16.75	Q
7	A	Can Özüpek	Turkey	16.75			16.75	Q, SB
9	B	Benjamin Compaoré	France	16.34	16.00	16.72	16.72	Q, SB
10	B	Necati Er	Turkey	15.45	16.68		16.68	Q
11	A	Andrea Dallavalle	Italy	16.03	16.57	16.59	16.59	q, SB
12	B	Răzvan Cristian Grecu	Romania	x	16.15	16.48	16.48	q, SB
13	B	Alexis Copello	Azerbaijan	16.02	16.44	16.43	16.44	SB
14	B	Tobia Bocchi	Italy	16.39	16.43	16.27	16.43	qR, SB
15	B	Dimitrios Tsiamis	Greece	16.32	16.33	16.32	16.33	
16	A	Tomáš Veszelka	Slovakia	16.23	16.28	16.31	16.31	
17	B	Vladyslav Shepeliev	Ukraine	15.84	x	16.17	16.17	
18	A	Gabriel Wallmark	Sweden	16.13	15.94	16.14	16.14	SB
19	A	Razvan-Ioan Nicoară	Romania	x	16.13	x	16.48	
20	A	Simo Lipsanen	Finland	16.12	r		16.12	
21	A	Lachezar Valchev	Bulgaria	15.96	14.10	15.79	15.96	
22	A	Artem Konovalenko	Ukraine	x	15.19	15.94	15.94	=SB
23	B	Aaro Davidila	Finland	15.85	13.68	x	15.85	
24	A	Levon Aghasyan	Armenia	x	15.59	15.80	15.80	
25	B	Tuomas Kaukolahti	Finland	15.32	15.64	15.79	15.79	
26	B	Sandis Dzenītis	Latvia	14.98	15.11	15.45	15.45	SB
27	A	Andreas Pantazis	Greece	15.36	x	x	15.36	
	B	Dimitar Tashev	Bulgaria	x	x	x	NM	

=== Final ===
The final started on 11 June at 20:55.

Rank	Name	Nationality	#1	#2	#3	#4	#5	#6	Result	Note
1st place, gold medalist(s)	Jordan Díaz	Spain	17.56	17.82	x	17.96	18.18	–	18.18	CR, NR
2nd place, silver medalist(s)	Pedro Pichardo	Portugal	17.51	18.04	17.55	–	17.57	17.92	18.04	NR
3rd place, bronze medalist(s)	Thomas Gogois	France	16.56	x	16.90	16.96	x	17.38	17.38	PB
4	Tiago Pereira	Portugal	17.08	x	x	x	14.65	16.20	17.08	=SB
5	Max Heß	Germany	16.92	17.04	x	16.87	15.56	x	17.04	SB
6	Jean-Marc Pontvianne	France	x	17.04	x	16.83	16.76	x	17.04	
7	Emmanuel Ihemeje	Italy	16.87	x	16.91	16.92	16.00	x	16.92	
8	Andrea Dallavalle	Italy	x	16.63	16.90	x	16.90	16.85	16.90	SB
9	Necati Er	Turkey	14.27	16.61	16.54				16.61	
10	Can Özüpek	Turkey	16.14	14.30	16.23				16.23	
11	Tobia Bocchi	Italy	16.16	x	16.18				16.18	
12	Benjamin Compaoré	France	16.05	x	16.00				16.05	
13	Răzvan Cristian Grecu	Romania	x	15.96	x				15.96	
