= Samuele Cerro =

Italian triple jumper (born 1995)

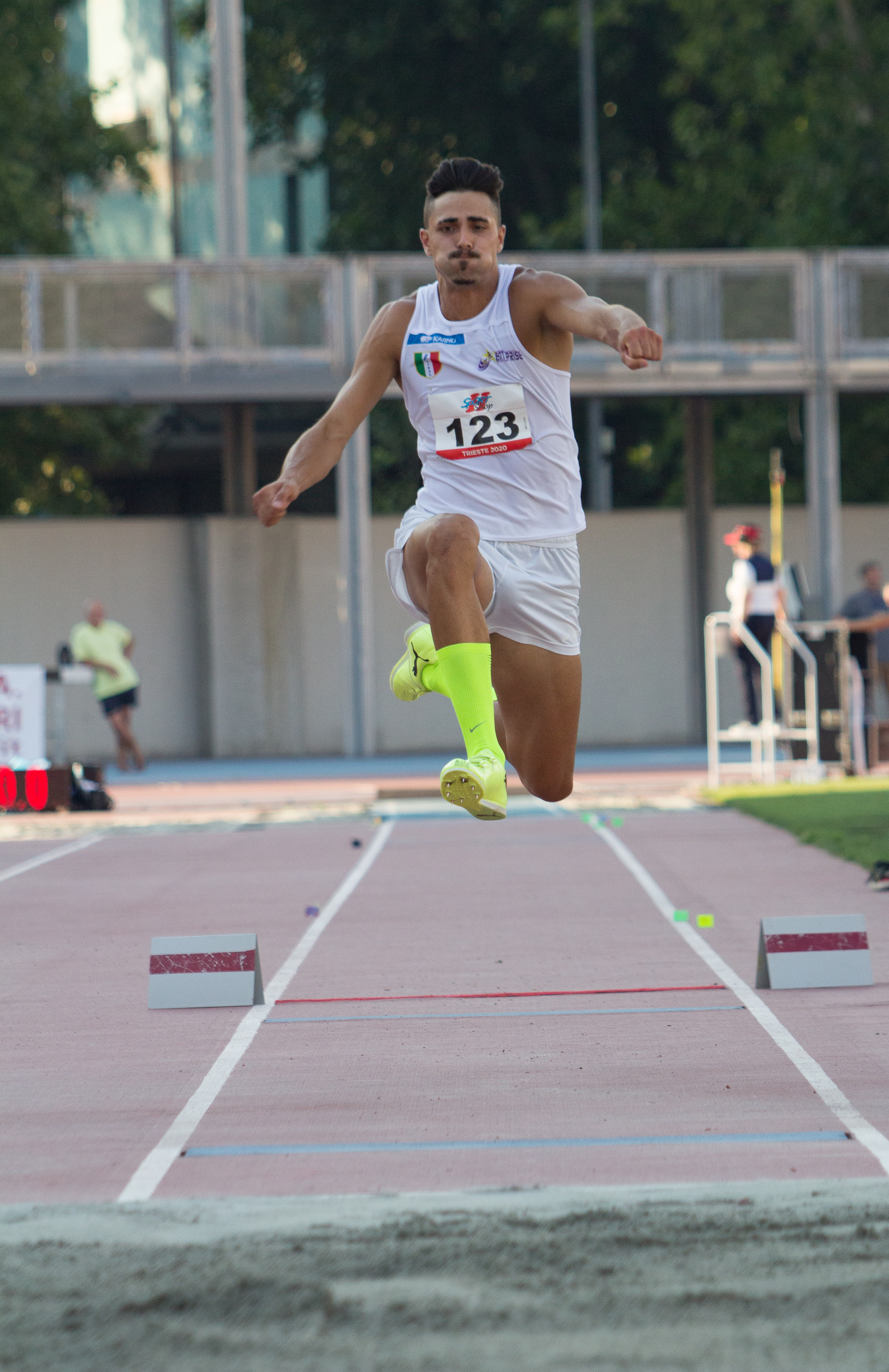
- Samuele Cerro at the 2020 Triveneto Meeting in Trieste, Italy

Personal information
- National team: Italy: 3 caps (2018-)
- Born: 21 March 1995 (age 31) Pontecorvo
- Height: 191 cm (6 ft 3 in)
- Weight: 78 kg (172 lb)

Sport
- Country: Italy
- Sport: Athletics
- Event: Triple jump
- Club: Asd Enterprise Sport & Service

Achievements and titles
- Personal best: Triple jump: 16.59 m (2019)

Samuele Cerro (born 21 March 1995) is an Italian triple jumper.

== Biography ==
Cerro was a finalist at the 2017 European Athletics U23 Championships. In July 2019, he was a finalist at the Summer Universiade and then he won the national title at the Italian Championships in Brixen.

== Personal best ==
- Triple jump: 16.59 m (Agropoli, june 2019)

== National titles ==
- Italian Athletics Championships
  - Triple jump: 2019

== See also ==
- Italy at the 2019 Summer Universiade
