= Tomáš Veszelka =

Slovak triple jumper

Personal information
- Born: 6 July 1995 (age 30) Lučenec, Slovakia
- Education: Matej Bel University
- Height: 1.83 m (6 ft 0 in)
- Weight: 79 kg (174 lb)

Sport
- Sport: Athletics
- Event: Triple jump
- Club: ŠK Dukla o.z. Banská Bystrica
- Coached by: Radoslav Dubovský
Medal record
Men's athletics
Representing Slovakia
European Games
Gold medal – first place	2015 Baku	Mixed team

Tomáš Veszelka (born 6 July 1995) is a Slovak athlete specialising in the triple jump. He reached the final at the 2018 European Championships finishing eighth. In addition, he finished fourth at the 2017 European U23 Championships.

His personal bests in the event are 16.74 metres outdoors (+0.4 m/s, Székesfehérvár 2019) and 16.78 metres indoors (Glasgow 2019).

== International competitions ==
Year	Competition	Venue	Position	Event	Notes
Representing Slovakia
2011	European Youth Olympic Festival	Trabzon, Turkey	6th	Long jump	7.20 m
2011	European Youth Olympic Festival	Trabzon, Turkey	6th	Triple jump	15.26 m
2013	European Junior Championships	Rieti, Italy	8th	Triple jump	15.42 m
2014	World Junior Championships	Eugene, United States	14th (q)	Triple jump	15.33 m
2015	European Indoor Championships	Prague, Czech Republic	22nd (q)	Long jump	7.24 m
2015	European U23 Championships	Tallinn, Estonia	5th	Triple jump	16.31 m
2017	European Indoor Championships	Belgrade, Serbia	13th (q)	Triple jump	16.34 m
2017	European U23 Championships	Bydgoszcz, Poland	4th	Triple jump	16.63 m
2017	Universiade	Taipei, Taiwan	11th	Triple jump	15.50 m
2018	European Championships	Berlin, Germany	8th	Triple jump	16.48 m
2019	European Indoor Championships	Glasgow, United Kingdom	6th	Triple jump	16.35 m
2024	European Championships	Rome, Italy	16th (q)	Triple jump	16.31 m
2025	European Indoor Championships	Apeldoorn, Netherlands	10th (q)	Triple jump	15.94 m
