= Agustín Carrera =

Argentine hurdler

Personal information
- Born: 13 June 1988 (age 38)

Sport
- Sport: Athletics
- Event: 110 metres hurdles

Agustín Carrera (born 13 June 1988) is an Argentine athlete specialising in the 110 metres hurdles. He won a bronze medal at the 2018 Ibero-American Championships.

His personal bests are 13.74 seconds in the 110 metres hurdles (+1.8 m/s, Buenos Aires 2014) and 7.89 in the 60 metres hurdles (São Caetano do Sul 2014). Both are current national records.

== International competitions ==
Year	Competition	Venue	Position	Event	Notes
Representing Argentina
2010	South American Games / South American U23 Championships	Medellín, Colombia	4th	110 m hurdles	14.31
2012	Ibero-American Championships	Barquisimeto, Venezuela	4th	110 m hurdles	13.92
2013	South American Championships	Cartagena, Colombia	5th	110 m hurdles	13.98
2013	Universiade	Kazan, Russia	13th (h)	110 m hurdles	14.00
2014	South American Games	Santiago, Chile	4th	110 m hurdles	13.86
2014	Ibero-American Championships	São Paulo, Brazil	5th	110 m hurdles	13.80
2014	Pan American Sports Festival	Mexico City, Mexico	7th	110 m hurdles	14.01
2015	South American Championships	Lima, Peru	6th	110 m hurdles	14.54
2015	Universiade	Gwangju, South Korea	15th (h)	110 m hurdles	14.42
2017	South American Championships	Asunción, Paraguay	6th	110 m hurdles	14.16 (w)
2018	South American Games	Cochabamba, Bolivia	7th	110 m hurdles	14.00
2018	Ibero-American Championships	Trujillo, Peru	3rd	110 m hurdles	14.16
2019	South American Championships	Lima, Peru	5th	110 m hurdles	14.15
2020	South American Indoor Championships	Cochabamba, Bolivia	3rd	60 m hurdles	7.87
2020	South American Indoor Championships	Cochabamba, Bolivia	2nd	4 × 400 m relay	3:29.45
2021	South American Championships	Guayaquil, Ecuador	5th	110 m hurdles	14.14
2022	South American Indoor Championships	Cochabamba, Bolivia	3rd	60 m hurdles	7.85
