= Alexsandro Melo =

Brazilian long jumper (born 1995)

Alexsandro de Melo
Personal information
- Full name: Alexsandro do Nascimento de Melo
- Born: 26 September 1995 (age 31) Londrina, Brazil
- Height: 1.79 m (5 ft 10 in)
- Weight: 56 kg (123 lb)

Sport
- Country: Brazil
- Sport: Track and field
- Events: Long jump, triple jump
Medal record
Men's athletics
Representing Brazil
Summer Universiade
Bronze medal – third place	2019 Napoli	Triple Jump
South American Games
Bronze medal – third place	2018 Cochabamba	Long Jump
- Updated on 24 June 2021

Alexsandro do Nascimento de Melo (born 26 September 1995) is a Brazilian long jumper.

He won a bronze medal in the 2018 South American Games at long jump, a bronze medal in the 2019 Summer Universiade at triple jump, and finished 4th in the 2019 Pan American Games in long jump.

He qualified to represent Brazil at the 2020 Summer Olympics.

== Personal bests ==
- Long Jump: 8.19 (wind: +1.9 m/s) – (Brazil) Bragança Paulista, 16 Sep 2018
- Triple Jump: 17.31 (wind: +0.4 m/s) – (Brazil) Cochabamba, 24 Apr 2019
- 100 m: 10.57 (wind: -0.3 m/s) – (Brazil) São Paulo, 15 Feb 2017

== Competition record ==
Year	Competition	Venue	Position	Event	Notes
Representing Brazil
2013	South American Junior Championships	Resistencia, Argentina	1st	Triple jump	16.24 m (w)
2015	Pan American Games	Toronto, Canada	14th (q)	Long jump	7.51 m (w)
2015	World Championships	Beijing, China	–	Long jump	NM
2018	South American Games	Cochabamba, Bolivia	3rd	Long jump	8.09 m
2018	Ibero-American Championships	Trujillo, Peru	5th	Long jump	7.75 m
2018	Ibero-American Championships	Trujillo, Peru	3rd	Triple jump	15.94 m
2019	Universiade	Naples, Italy	11th	Long jump	7.54 m
2019	Universiade	Naples, Italy	3rd	Triple jump	16.57 m
2019	Pan American Games	Lima, Peru	4th	Long jump	7.77 m
2019	Pan American Games	Lima, Peru	8th	Triple jump	16.23 m
2019	World Championships	Doha, Qatar	27th (q)	Triple jump	16.26 m
2020	South American Indoor Championships	Cochabamba, Bolivia	1st	Long jump	8.08 m
2020	South American Indoor Championships	Cochabamba, Bolivia	1st	Triple jump	17.10 m
2021	South American Championships	Guayaquil, Ecuador	3rd	Long jump	7.93 m
2021	South American Championships	Guayaquil, Ecuador	1st	Triple jump	16.97 m
2021	Olympic Games	Tokyo, Japan	29th (q)	Long jump	6.95 m
2021	Olympic Games	Tokyo, Japan	26th (q)	Triple jump	15.65 m
2022	South American Indoor Championships	Cochabamba, Bolivia	1st	Triple jump	16.62 m
2022	World Indoor Championships	Belgrade, Serbia	11th	Triple jump	16.07 m
2022	Ibero-American Championships	La Nucía, Spain	9th	Long jump	7.40 m
2022	Ibero-American Championships	La Nucía, Spain	8th	Triple jump	15.71 m
2022	World Championships	Eugene, United States	–	Triple jump	NM
2022	South American Games	Asunción, Paraguay	8th	Long jump	7.10 m
2022	South American Games	Asunción, Paraguay	5th	Triple jump	15.47 m
2026	South American Indoor Championships	Cochabamba, Bolivia	1st	Long jump	7.89 m
2026	Ibero-American Championships	Lima, Peru	6th	Long jump	7.55 m
2026	South American Games	Santa Fe, Argentina	–	Long jump	NM
