= Mateus de Sá =

Brazilian triple jumper

Personal information
- Full name: Mateus Daniel Adão de Sá
- Born: 21 November 1995 (age 30) Dracena, Brazil
- Education: Santa Anna University Centre
- Height: 1.84 m (6 ft 0 in)
- Weight: 82 kg (181 lb)

Sport
- Sport: Athletics
- Event: Triple jump
- Club: Esporte Clube Pinheiros
Medal record
Men's athletics
Representing Brazil
South American Games
Silver medal – second place	2018 Cochabamba	Triple jump
Universiade
Silver medal – second place	2019 Napoles	Triple jump
World Junior Championships
Bronze medal – third place	2014 Oregon	Triple jump

Mateus Daniel Adão de Sá (born 21 November 1995 in Dracena) is a Brazilian athlete specialising in the triple jump. He represented his country at the 2017 World Championships without reaching the final. Additionally, he won the bronze medal at the 2014 World Junior Championships. He competed at the 2020 Summer Olympics.

His personal best in the event is 16.87 m (+0.5 m/s) set in São Bernardo do Campo in 2017.

== International competitions ==
Year	Competition	Venue	Position	Event	Notes
Representing Brazil
2012	South American Youth Championships	Mendoza, Argentina	1st	Triple jump	15.26 m
2013	South American Junior Championships	Resistencia, Argentina	2nd	Triple jump	16.14 m
2014	World Junior Championships	Eugene, United States	3rd	Triple jump	16.47 m
2016	Ibero-American Championships	Rio de Janeiro, Brazil	1st	Triple jump	16.40 m
2016	South American U23 Championships	Lima, Peru	3rd	Triple jump	15.54 m
2017	South American Championships	Asunción, Paraguay	2nd	Triple jump	16.70 m (w)
2017	World Championships	London, United Kingdom	27th (q)	Triple jump	16.10 m
2017	Universiade	Taipei, Taiwan	8th	Triple jump	16.08 m
2018	South American Games	Cochabamba, Bolivia	2nd	Triple jump	16.76 m
2019	Universiade	Naples, Italy	2nd	Triple jump	16.57 m
2020	South American Indoor Championships	Cochabamba, Bolivia	2nd	Triple jump	16.62 m
2021	South American Championships	Guayaquil, Ecuador	5th	Triple jump	16.03 m (w)
2021	Olympic Games	Tokyo, Japan	20th (q)	Triple jump	16.49 m
2022	World Championships	Eugene, United States	24th (q)	Triple jump	16.04 m
2022	South American Games	Asunción, Paraguay	3rd	Triple jump	15.98 m
2023	South American Championships	São Paulo, Brazil	6th	Triple jump	15.94 m
2024	South American Indoor Championships	Cochabamba, Bolivia	4th	Triple jump	15.97 m
