= Athletics at the 2010 South American Games – Men's 110 metre hurdles =

The Men's 110m Hurdles event at the 2010 South American Games was held on March 20 at 18:00.

== Medalists ==
Gold	Silver	Bronze
Jorge McFarlane; Peru	Jolver Lozano; Colombia	Javier McFarlane; Peru

== Records ==
Standing records prior to the 2010 South American Games
World record	Dayron Robles	Cuba	12.87	Ostrava, Czech Republic	12 June 2008
World Leading	Andre Storm	South Africa	13.89	Potchefstroom, South Africa	4 March 2010
South American record	Redelén dos Santos	Brazil	13.29	Lisbon, Portugal	16 June 2004
South American record	Paulo Villar	Colombia	13.29	Cartagena, Colombia	26 July 2006
South American U23 record	Mateus Inocêncio	Brazil	13.42	Cochabamba, Bolivia	11 May 2003

== Results ==
Results were published.

=== Final ===
Rank	Athlete	Nationality	Reaction	Result	Notes
1st place, gold medalist(s)	Jorge McFarlane	Peru	0.186	13.75	NR, WL
2nd place, silver medalist(s)	Jolver Lozano	Colombia	0.225	14.26	
3rd place, bronze medalist(s)	Javier McFarlane	Peru	0.142	14.29	SB
4	Agustín Carrera	Argentina	0.189	14.31	SB
5	Jonathan Henrique Silva	Brazil	0.195	14.47	
6	Diego dos Santos de Araújo	Brazil	0.229	14.48	
7	Nelson Camilo Acerey	Bolivia	0.175	15.22	
			Wind: +0.7 m/s		

== See also ==
- 2010 South American Under-23 Championships in Athletics
