= Levon Aghasyan =

Armenian triple jumper (born 1995)

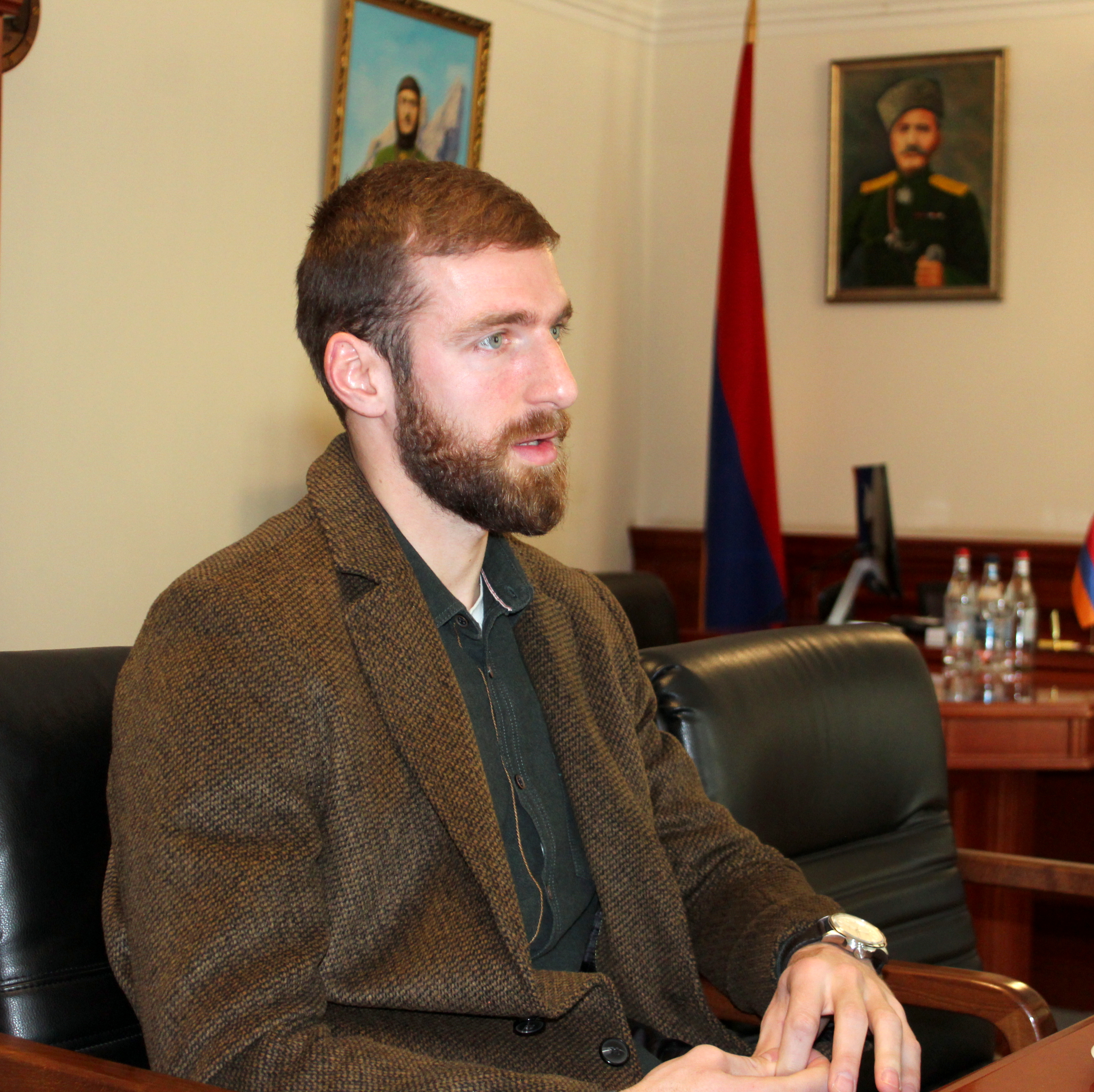

Personal information
- Born: 19 January 1995 (age 31) Kapan, Armenia
- Height: 1.93 m (6 ft 4 in)
- Weight: 75 kg (165 lb)

Sport
- Sport: Athletics
- Event: Triple jump

Levon Aghasyan (Armenian: Լեւոն Աղասյան; born 19 January 1995) is an Armenian athlete specialising in the triple jump. He represented his country at the 2016 Summer Olympics and the 2020 Summer Olympics without qualifying for the final. In addition, he won the gold medal at the 2013 European Junior Championships.

His personal bests in the event are 16.85 metres outdoors (+0.9 m/s, Artashat 2016) and 16.59 metres indoors (Ust-Kamenogorsk 2017).

== International competitions ==
Year	Competition	Venue	Position	Event	Notes
Representing Armenia
2011	World Youth Championships	Lille, France	6th	Triple jump	15.24 m
2011	European Youth Olympic Festival	Trabzon, Turkey	4th	Triple jump	15.49 m (w)
2012	World Junior Championships	Barcelona, Spain	–	Triple jump	NM
2013	European Junior Championships	Rieti, Italy	1st	Triple jump	16.01 m
2014	World Junior Championships	Eugene, United States	5th	Triple jump	16.28 m
2015	European Indoor Championships	Prague, Czech Republic	16th (q)	Triple jump	15.94 m
2015	European U23 Championships	Tallinn, Estonia	8th	Triple jump	15.88 m
2016	European Championships	Amsterdam, Netherlands	20th (q)	Triple jump	16.21 m (w)
2016	Olympic Games	Rio de Janeiro, Brazil	36th (q)	Triple jump	15.54 m
2017	European Indoor Championships	Belgrade, Serbia	–	Triple jump	NM
2017	European U23 Championships	Bydgoszcz, Poland	13th (q)	Triple jump	15.62 m
2017	Jeux de la Francophonie	Abidjan, Ivory Coast	8th	Triple jump	15.52 m
2018	European Championships	Berlin, Germany	14th (q)	Triple jump	16.34 m
2019	European Indoor Championships	Glasgow, United Kingdom	10th (q)	Triple jump	16.38 m
2019	Universiade	Naples, Italy	10th	Triple jump	15.73 m
2019	World Championships	Doha, Qatar	29th (q)	Triple jump	16.24 m
2021	European Indoor Championships	Toruń, Poland	5th	Triple jump	16.55 m
2021	Olympic Games	Tokyo, Japan	21st	Triple jump	16.42 m
2022	European Championships	Munich, Germany	14th (q)	Triple jump	16.03 m
2023	European Indoor Championships	Istanbul, Turkey	15th (q)	Triple jump	15.89 m
2023	Jeux de la Francophonie	Kinshasa, DR Congo	3rd	Triple jump	16.40 m
2024	European Championships	Rome, Italy	24th (q)	Triple jump	15.80 m
