= Necati Er =

Turkish triple jumper (born 1997)

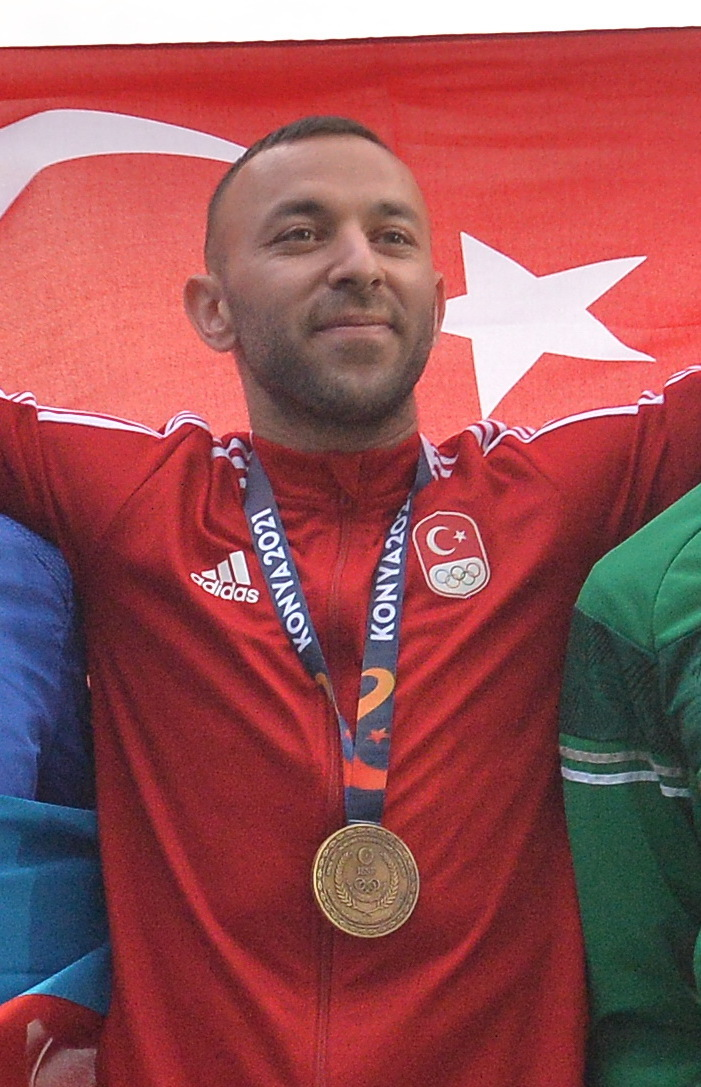
- Necati Er at the 2021 Islamic Solidarity Games

Personal information
- Born: 24 February 1997 (age 29) Samsun

Sport
- Sport: Athletics
- Event: Triple jump
Medal record
European Games
Silver medal – second place	2023 Kraków-Małopolska	Triple jump
Summer World University Games
Silver medal – second place	2021 Chengdu	Triple jump

Necati Er (born 24 February 1997) is a Turkish athlete specialising in the triple jump.

== Early life ==
Necati Er was born in Samsun, northern Turkey on 24 February 1997. In his youth, he developed an interest in sports. His teacher of physical education in middle school invited him to athletic trainings. At the same time, he played football. His father, earning a limited income, did not want him to perform further sports, while his mother supported him. His father permitted him only to play football, and did not let him perform athletics because he saw no future in that sport branch. One week before Er was about to join a football team, he was admitted to the athletics team. He became regional champion in Samsun, and then was entitled to compete at the Turkish championships, at which he became runner-up and champion. After his successes, his father agreed with his sports activities. He performed the sprint and long jump before he decided to specialise in the triple jump.

== Sports career ==
Er was able to improve his techniques after the Turkish Athletic Federation appointed a foreign coach for the triple jump.

He won gold at the 2019 European U23 Championships held in Gävle, Sweden with a new national record of 17.37 m (57.0 ft). With this result, he received a quota for the Athletics at the 2020 Summer Olympics.

== International competitions ==
Year	Competition	Venue	Position	Event	Notes
Representing Turkey
2013	European Youth Olympic Festival	Utrecht, Netherlands	7th	Triple jump	14.02 m
2015	European Junior Championships	Eskilstuna, Sweden	14th (q)	Triple jump	15.34 m
2016	Mediterranean U23 Championships	Tunis, Tunisia	4th	Triple jump	16.06 m
2016	World U20 Championships	Bydgoszcz, Poland	29th (q)	Triple jump	15.02 m
2017	European U23 Championships	Bydgoszcz, Poland	9th	Triple jump	15.82 m
2018	Mediterranean U23 Championships	Jesolo, Italy	4th	Triple jump	16.31 m
2018	European Championships	Berlin, Germany	18th (q)	Triple jump	16.26 m
2019	European Indoor Championships	Glasgow, United Kingdom	14th (q)	Triple jump	16.21 m
2019	European U23 Championships	Gävle, Sweden	1st	Triple jump	17.37 m
2019	World Championships	Doha, Qatar	11th	Triple jump	16.34 m
2021	European Indoor Championships	Toruń, Poland	10th (q)	Triple jump	16.17 m
2021	Olympic Games	Tokyo, Japan	6th	Triple jump	17.25 m
2022	Mediterranean Games	Oran, Algeria	5th	Long jump	7.76 m
2022	Mediterranean Games	Oran, Algeria	4th	Triple jump	16.52 m
2022	Islamic Solidarity Games	Konya, Turkey	3rd	Long jump	7.83 m (w)
2022	Islamic Solidarity Games	Konya, Turkey	1st	Triple jump	16.73 m
2022	European Championships	Munich, Germany	–	Triple jump	NM
2023	World University Games	Chengdu, China	2nd	Triple jump	16.83 m
2023	World Championships	Budapest, Hungary	16th (q)	Triple jump	16.59 m
2024	European Championships	Rome, Italy	9th	Triple jump	16.61 m
2024	Olympic Games	Paris, France	32nd (q)	Triple jump	13.65 m
2026	World Indoor Championships	Toruń, Poland	13th	Triple jump	16.36 m
2026	European Championships	Birmingham, United Kingdom	11th	Triple jump	15.77 m

== Personal bests ==
Outdoor

- Long jump – 7.41 (+0.7 m/s, Cluj-Napoca 2019)
- Triple jump – 17.37 (+1.1 m/s, Gävle 2019) NR

Indoor

- Long jump – 6.68 (Istanbul 2014)
- Triple jump – 16.61 (Istanbul 2018)
