= 2020 South American Indoor Championships in Athletics =

1st South American Indoor Championships
- Dates: 1–2 February
- Host city: Cochabamba, Bolivia
- Venue: Estadio de Atletismo del Gobierno Autónomo Municipal de Cochabamba
- Level: Senior
- Events: 26 (13 men, 13 women)
- Participation: 101 athletes from 11 nations

2020 South American Indoor Championships in Athletics was the inaugural edition of the biennial indoor athletics competition between South American nations. The event was held in Cochabamba, Bolivia, on 1 and 2 February at the Estadio de Atletismo del Gobierno Autónomo Municipal de Cochabamba.

== Medal summary ==
=== Men ===
Event	Gold		Silver		Bronze	
60 metres	Jeffrey Vanan (SUR)	6.80	Rafael Vásquez (VEN)	6.85	Franco Florio (ARG)	6.85
200 metres	Virjilio Griggs (PAN)	20.81	Rafael Vásquez (VEN)	21.34	Franco Florio (ARG)	21.89
400 metres	Elián Larregina (ARG)	47.52 NR	Marco Vilca (PER)	47.84	Anderson Henriques (BRA)	47.91
800 metres	Lucirio Antonio Garrido (VEN)	1:53.54	Marco Vilca (PER)	1:54.11 NR	Alejandro Peirano (CHI)	1:54.52
1500 metres	Federico Bruno (ARG)	3:56.88	Santiago Catrofe (URU)	3:58.18 NR	Yessy Apaza (BOL)	4:00.36
3000 metres	Juan Jorge Gonzáles (BOL)	8:31.90	Ruben Erick Arando (BOL)	8:41.17	Only two finishers	
60 metres hurdles	Gabriel Constantino (BRA)	7.78	Eduardo de Deus (BRA)	7.81	Agustín Carrera (ARG)	7.87 NR
4 × 400 metres relay	Bolivia; Fernando Copa; Pablo Abán; Tito Hinojosa; Sebastián Vargas	3:25.61	Argentina; Franco Florio; Maximiliano Díaz; Agustín Carrera; Elián Larregina	3:29.45 NR	Only two participating teams	
High jump	Fernando Ferreira (BRA)	2.25	Eure Yáñez (VEN)	2.22 NR	Thiago Moura (BRA)	2.19
Pole vault	Germán Chiaraviglio (ARG)	5.50	Only one finisher			
Long jump	Alexsandro Melo (BRA)	8.08	Leodan Torrealba (VEN)	7.72	José Luis Mandros (PER)	7.72
Triple jump	Alexsandro Melo (BRA)	17.10	Mateus de Sá (BRA)	16.62	Maximiliano Díaz (ARG)	16.52 NR
Shot put	Willian Dourado (BRA)	19.09	Ignacio Carballo (ARG)	18.76	Aldo González (BOL)	18.73
WR world record | AR area record | CR championship record | GR games record | NR national record | OR Olympic record | PB personal best | SB season best | WL world leading (in a given season)

=== Women ===
Event	Gold		Silver		Bronze	
60 metres	Rosângela Santos (BRA)	7.34	Natalia Linares (COL)	7.42 NR	María Victoria Woodward (ARG)	7.51
200 metres	Natalia Linares (COL)}	24.19 CR	María Fernanda Mackenna (CHI)	24.24	Noelia Martínez (ARG)	24.41 NR
400 metres	Tiffani Marinho (BRA)	53.34	María Fernanda Mackenna (CHI)	54.45 NR	Geisa Coutinho (BRA)	54.75
800 metres	Déborah Rodríguez (URU)	2:14.14	Mariana Borelli (ARG)	2:16.99	María Marascia (COL)	2:17.98
1500 metres	María Pía Fernández (URU)	4:31.03 NR	Jhoselyn Camargo (BOL)	4:34.94	Mariana Borelli (ARG)	4:38.29
3000 metres	Jhoselyn Camargo (BOL)	9:55.68	Edith Mamani (BOL)	10:00.72	Only two finishers	
60 metres hurdles	María Ignacia Eguiguren (CHI)	8.40 NR	María Florencia Lamboglia (ARG)	8.67	Diana Bazalar (PER)	8.85
4 × 400 metres relay	Bolivia; Lucía Sotomayor; Alinny Delgadillo; Leticia Arispe; Cecilia Gómez	4:00.77	Only one participating team			
High jump	Valdiléia Martins (BRA)	1.82	Lorena Aires (URU)	1.79 NR	Betsabé Páez (ARG)	1.73
Pole vault	Nicole Hein (PER)	4.00 NR	Juliana Campos (BRA)	3.80	Only two participants	
Long jump	Nathalee Aranda (PAN)	6.58 NR	Aries Sánchez (VEN)	6.50	Eliane Martins (BRA)	6.44
Triple jump	Liuba Zaldívar (ECU)	13.52 NR	Valeria Quispe (BOL)	13.12	Silvana Segura (PER)	13.07 NR
Shot put	Geisa Arcanjo (BRA)	17.09	Ivana Gallardo (CHI)	16.53	Only two participants	
WR world record | AR area record | CR championship record | GR games record | NR national record | OR Olympic record | PB personal best | SB season best | WL world leading (in a given season)

== Medal table ==
The host country is highlighted in lavender blue

Rank	Nation	Gold	Silver	Bronze	Total
1	Brazil	9	3	4	16
2	Bolivia*	4	4	2	10
3	Argentina	3	4	8	15
4	Uruguay	2	2	0	4
5	Panama	2	0	0	2
6	Venezuela	1	5	0	6
7	Chile	1	3	1	5
8	Peru	1	2	3	6
9	Colombia	1	1	1	3
10	Ecuador	1	0	0	1
10	Suriname	1	0	0	1
Totals (11 entries)		26	24	19	69

== Participation ==
Eleven member federations of CONSUDATLE participated in the championships.

- Argentina (17)
- Bolivia (29)
- Brazil (19)
- Chile (7)
- Colombia (3)
- Ecuador (1)
- Panama (8)
- Peru (6)
- Suriname (2)
- Uruguay (4)
- Venezuela (5)

== See also ==
- 2019 South American Championships in Athletics
- Athletics at the 2019 Pan American Games
- 2020 South American U23 Championships in Athletics
- 2020 Ibero-American Championships in Athletics
- Athletics at the 2020 Summer Olympics
