= List of Chilean records in athletics =

The following are the national records in athletics in Chile maintained by its national athletics federation: Federación Atlética de Chile (FEDACHI).

== Outdoor ==
Key to tables: Awaiting ratification Record not kept by FEDACHI Not ratified or later rescinded by FEDACHI

=== Men ===
| Event | Record | Athlete | Date | Meet | Place | Ref. |
|---|---|---|---|---|---|---|
| 100 m | 10.10 (+2.0 m/s) | Sebastián Keitel | 26 April 1998 | | São Leopoldo, Brazil | |
| 100 m | 10.10 (+1.0 m/s) | Sebastián Keitel | 17 July 1998 | Ibero-American Championships | Lisbon, Portugal | |
| 200 m | 20.15 (+0.4 m/s) | Sebastián Keitel | 17 May 1998 | | Santiago, Chile | |
| 400 m | 45.92 | Ricardo Roach | 21 March 1998 | | Santiago, Chile | |
| 800 m | 1:45.75 | Pablo Squella | 12 August 1990 | | Hengelo, Netherlands | |
| 1500 m | 3:37.82 | Carlos Díaz | 3 June 2016 | 12th Meeting Iberoamericano | Huelva, Spain | |
| Mile run | 4:02.82 | Juan Peña | 24 August 2024 | The Monument Mile Classic | Stirling, United Kingdom | |
| 3000 m | 7:52.53 | Iván López | 14 May 2016 | Ibero-American Championships | Rio de Janeiro, Brazil | |
| 5000 m | 13:23.68 | Mauricio Díaz | 14 July 2001 | | Heusden, Belgium | |
| 5 km (road) | 14:27+ | Carlos Díaz | 17 October 2020 | World Half Marathon Championships | Gdynia, Poland | |
| 10,000 m | 27:58.97 | Carlos Díaz | 20 May 2023 | Night of the 10000m PBs | London, United Kingdom | |
| 10 km (road) | 28:16 | Jaime Ojeda | 29 June 1997 | | Santiago, Chile | |
| 15 km (road) | 43:49+ | Carlos Díaz | 17 October 2020 | World Half Marathon Championships | Gdynia, Poland | |
| 20 km (road) | 58:33+ | Carlos Díaz | 17 October 2020 | World Half Marathon Championships | Gdynia, Poland | |
| Half marathon | 1:01:32 | Carlos Díaz | 17 October 2020 | World Half Marathon Championships | Gdynia, Poland | |
| 25 km (road) | 1:15:52+ | Carlos Díaz | 18 February 2024 | Seville Marathon | Seville, Spain | |
| 30 km (road) | 1:30:56+ | Carlos Díaz | 18 February 2024 | Seville Marathon | Seville, Spain | |
| Marathon | 2:12:19 | Omar Aguilar | 17 April 1988 | Rotterdam Marathon | Rotterdam, Netherlands | |
| Marathon | 2:10:26 | Carlos Díaz | 19 February 2023 | Seville Marathon | Seville, Spain | |
| Marathon | 2:08:44 | Hugo Catrileo | 14 January 2024 | Houston Marathon | Houston, United States | |
| Marathon | 2:08:04 | Carlos Diaz | 18 February 2024 | Seville Marathon | Seville, Spain | |
| 110 m hurdles | 13.78 (+0.6 m/s) | Gonzalo Barroilhet | 30 May 2008 | | Tallahassee, United States | |
| 110 m hurdles | 13.60 (+0.2 m/s) | Martín Sáenz | 27 May 2023 | Chilean Championships | Santiago, Chile | |
| 110 m hurdles | 13.57 (+2.0 m/s) | Martín Sáenz | 13 April 2024 | Torneo Carlos Strutz | Santiago, Chile | |
| 400 m hurdles | 49.62 A | Alfredo Sepúlveda | 7 June 2018 | South American Games | Cochabamba, Bolivia | |
| 3000 m steeplechase | 8:28.99 | Emilio Ulloa | 9 August 1984 | | Los Angeles, United States | |
| High jump | 2.22 m A | Felipe Apablaza | 3 June 2001 | | Cochabamba, Bolivia | |
| Pole vault | 5.50 m | Thomas Riether | 28 May 1992 | | Tallahassee FL, United States | |
| Long jump | 8.08 m (+1.9 m/s) | Daniel Pineda | 21 April 2012 | National Championships | Santiago, Chile | |
| Triple jump | 16.74 m (+1.2 m/s) | Álvaro Cortez | 26 March 2017 | | Santiago, Chile | |
| Shot put | 21.14 m | Marco Antonio Verni | 29 July 2004 | | Santiago, Chile | |
| Discus throw | 69.65 m | Claudio Romero | 13 April 2025 | Oklahoma Throws Series World Invitational | Ramona, United States | |
| Hammer throw | 77.70 m | Humberto Mansilla | 20 May 2021 | Campo de Deportes Ñielo | Temuco, Chile | |
| Javelin throw | 78.69 m | Ignacio Guerra | 1 April 2011 | Florida Relays | Gainesville, United States | |
| Decathlon | 8065 pts | Gonzalo Barroilhet | 19–20 April 2012 | ACC Championships | Charlottesville, United States | |
| Decathlon | 100m (wind) / Long jump (wind) / Shot put / High jump / 400m / 110m H (wind) / Discus / Pole vault / Javelin / 1500m; 10.99 (+0.8 m/s) / 6.96 m (±0.0 m/s) / 14.34 m / 2.06 m / 50.84 / 14.14 (+0.2 m/s) / 45.22 m / 5.30 m / 54.70 m / 4:49.19 | | | | | |
| 20,000 m walk (track) | 1:20:47.2 h | Yerko Araya | 5 June 2011 | South American Championships | Buenos Aires, Argentina | |
| 20 km walk (road) | 1:21:26 | Yerko Araya | 21 February 2016 | Oceania Race Walking Championships | Adelaide, Australia | |
| 35 km walk (road) | 2:45:39+ | Edward Araya | 24 February 2013 | IAAF World Race Walking Challenge | Chihuahua, Mexico | |
| 50,000 m walk (track) | 4:14:34.0 | Luis Villagra | 29 June 2003 | | Temuco, Chile | |
| 50 km walk (road) | 3:58:54 A | Edward Araya | 6 March 2016 | IAAF Race Walking Challenge | Ciudad Juarez, Mexico | |
| 4 × 100 m relay | 39.49 | Chile; Sebastián Keitel; Juan P. Faúndez; Ricardo Roach; Rodrigo Roach | 11 June 2000 | | São Paulo, Brazil | |
| 4 × 400 m relay | 3:06.34 A | Chile; Hernán Hevia; Alejandro Krauss; Pablo Squella; Carlos Morales | 8 August 1989 | South American Championships | Medellín, Colombia | |
| 4 × 1500 m relay | 15:38.4 | Ricardo Montero; Roberto Salmona; Pedro E. Warnke; Víctor Ríos | 1971 | | | |

=== Women ===
| Event | Record | Athlete | Date | Meet | Place | Ref. |
|---|---|---|---|---|---|---|
| 100 m | 11.19 A (−1.2 m/s) | Isidora Jiménez | 6 June 2018 | South American Games | Cochabamba, Bolivia | |
| 200 m | 22.82 (+1.1 m/s) | Martina Weil | 3 August 2025 | Belgian Championships | Brussels, Belgium | |
| 300 m | 36.16 | Martina Weil | 23 August 2026 | Kamila Skolimowska Memorial | Chorzów, Poland | |
| 400 m | 49.72 | Martina Weil | 28 August 2025 | Weltklasse Zürich | Zurich, Switzerland | |
| 600 m | 1:26.54 | Berdine Castillo | 18 June 2024 | XIX Reunión Internacional Villa de Bilbao | Bilbao, Spain | |
| 800 m | 2:00.20 | Alejandra Ramos | 3 September 1990 | | Jerez, Spain | |
| 1500 m | 4:13.07 | Alejandra Ramos | 15 September 1990 | Ibero-American Championships | Manaus, Brazil | |
| 3000 m | 9:15.31 | Alejandra Ramos | 28 June 1992 | | Valencia, Spain | |
| 5000 m | 15:51.45 | Erika Olivera | 20 May 2000 | Ibero-American Championships | Rio de Janeiro, Brazil | |
| 10,000 m | 33:23.12 | Erika Olivera | 30 November 1996 | | Concepción, Chile | |
| 10 km (road) | 33:22 | Marlene Flores | 29 June 1997 | Olympic Day | Santiago de Chile, Chile | |
| Half marathon | 1:11:54 | Erika Olivera | 10 September 2000 | | Santiago de Chile, Chile | |
| Marathon | 2:32:23 | Erika Olivera | 18 April 1999 | Rotterdam Marathon | Rotterdam, Netherlands | |
| 100 m hurdles | 13.30 A (+0.4 m/s) | Francisca Guzmán | 11 May 2003 | | Cochabamba, Bolivia | |
| 400 m hurdles | 57.80 | Javiera Errázuriz | 28 November 2013 | Bolivarian Games | Trujillo, Peru | |
| 3000 m steeplechase | 10:23.92 | María José Calfilaf | 29 July 2023 | South American Championships | São Paulo, Brazil (Note: by World Athletics source; Lima (Peru) by FEDACHI source, a typo) | |
| High jump | 1.80 m 1.80 m A 1.80 m A | Alejandra Chomalí; Kerstin Weiss; Kerstin Weiss | 28 August 1994; 3 June 2001; 1 June 2005 | | Santiago de Chile, Chile; Cochabamba, Bolivia; Cochabamba, Bolivia | |
| Pole vault | 4.30 m | Carolina Torres | 9 August 2003 | | Santo Domingo, Dominican Republic | |
| Long jump | 6.60 m (+0.9 m/s) | Macarena Reyes | 2 June 2012 | Campeonato Metropolitano | Santiago de Chile, Chile | |
| Triple jump | 13.40 m (+1.8 m/s) | Norka Moretic | 23 July 2016 | World U20 Championships | Bydgoszcz, Poland | |
| Shot put | 18.97 m | Natalia Duco | 18 May 2018 | Broward Elite Athletic Club Showcase | Fort Lauderdale, United States | |
| Discus throw | 61.10 m | Karen Gallardo | 2 August 2015 | Torneo Internacional de Castellón | Castellón, Spain | |
| Hammer throw | 69.70 m | Mariana García | 20 May 2021 | Campo de Deportes Ñielo | Temuco, Chile | |
| Javelin throw | 54.62 m | María Paz Ríos | 19 February 2016 | | Havana, Cuba | |
| Heptathlon | 5360 pts | Macarena Reyes | 19–20 June 2009 | South American Championships | Lima, Peru | |
| Heptathlon | 100m H (wind) / High jump / Shot put / 200m (wind) / Long jump (wind) / Javelin / 800m; 14.27 (−0.6 m/s) / 1.67 m / 10.10 m / 25.48 m (−1.0 m/s) / 5.97 m (+0.5 m/s) / 33.40 m / 2:18.75 | | | | | |
| 10,000 m walk (track) | 50:32.61 | Anastasia Sanzana | 19 July 2016 | World Junior Championships | Bydgoszcz, Poland | |
| 20,000 m walk (track) | 1:44:28.9 | Marcela Pacheco | 17 May 2003 | | Santiago de Chile, Chile | |
| 20 km walk (road) | 1:41:01 | Marcela Pacheco | 3 April 2004 | | Los Ángeles, Chile | |
| 4 × 100 m relay | 44.83 | Chile; Paula Goñi; Josefina Gutiérrez; Isidora Jiménez; María Fernanda Mackenna | 13 June 2015 | South American Championships | Lima, Peru | |
| 4 × 100 m relay | 44.40 | Chile; Viviana Olivares; Isidora Jiménez; Anaís Hernández; Javiera Cañas | 29 July 2023 | South American Championships | São Paulo, Brazil | |
| 4 × 100 m relay | 44.19 | Chile; Anaís Hernández; Martina Weil; Isidora Jiménez; Maria Ignacia Montt | 1 November 2023 | Pan American Games | Santiago, Chile | |
| 4 × 100 m relay | 43.64 | Chile; Anaís Hernández; María Ignacia Montt; Isidora Jiménez; Antonia Ramírez | 10 May 2025 | World Relays | Guangzhou, China | |
| 4 × 400 m relay | 3:31.24 | Chile; Isidora Jiménez; Maria Echeverria; María Fernanda Mackenna; Martina Weil | 11 May 2019 | IAAF World Relays | Yokohama, Japan | |

=== Mixed ===
| Event | Record | Athlete | Date | Meet | Place | Ref. |
|---|---|---|---|---|---|---|
| 4 × 400 m relay | 3:27.06 | Chile; Martin Zabala; Valentina Barrientos; Alejandro Peirano; Poulette Cardoch | 10 May 2024 | Ibero-American Championships | Cuiabá, Brazil | |

== Indoor ==
=== Men ===
| Event | Record | Athlete | Date | Meet | Place | Ref. |
|---|---|---|---|---|---|---|
| 60 m | 6.61 | Kael Becerra | 10 February 2007 | | Valencia, Spain | |
| 200 m | 20.98 | Sebastián Keitel | 11 March 1995 | World Championships | Barcelona, Spain | |
| 400 m | 47.86 | Sergio Aldea | 24 February 2017 | | Madrid, Spain | |
| 400 m | 47.71 | Martín Kouyoumdjian | 10 February 2024 | Don Kirby Elite Invitatonal | Albuquerque, United States | |
| 800 m | 1:46.76 | Tomás Squella | 1 March 2013 | Arkansas Final Qualifier | Fayetteville, United States | |
| 1000 m | 2:21.19 | Pablo Squella | 1 March 1986 | | Fayetteville, United States | |
| 1500 m | 3:42.23 | Carlos Díaz | 7 February 2016 | | Sabadell, Spain | |
| 1500 m | 3:39.39 | Iván López | 19 February 2016 | Catalan Centenary Meeting | Sabadell, Spain | |
| Mile | 4:03.51 | Juan Campos | 27 February 2015 | | Blacksburg, Virginia | |
| 3000 m | 7:51.30 | Carlos Díaz | 2 February 2022 | | Valencia, Spain | |
| 3000 m | 7:44.31 | Daniel Estrada | 14 February 2020 | BU David Hemery Valentine Invitational | Boston, United States | |
| 60 m hurdles | 7.97 | Gonzalo Barroilhet | 29 January 2016 | | Clemson, United States | |
| High jump | 2.15 m | Heins Falter | 22 January 1992 | | Fürth, Germany | |
| Pole vault | 5.40 m A | Gonzalo Barroilhet | 24 January 2014 | New Mexico Cherry and Silver Invitational | Albuquerque, United States | |
| Long jump | 7.62 m A | Daniel Pineda | 1 February 2020 | South American Championships | Cochabamba, Bolivia | |
| Triple jump | 16.30 m A | Álvaro Cortez | 2 February 2020 | South American Championships | Cochabamba, Bolivia | |
| Shot put | 20.15 m | Gert Weil | 31 January 1985 | | Leverkusen, Germany | |
| Heptathlon | 5951 pts | Gonzalo Barroilhet | 14-15 March 2008 | NCAA Division I Championships | Fayetteville, United States | |
| Heptathlon | 60m / Long jump / Shot put / High jump / 60m H / Pole vault / 1000m; 7.19 / 7.42 m / 13.74 m / 2.02 m / 7.98 / 5.05 m / 2:49.30 | | | | | |
| 5000 m walk | | | | | | |
| 4 × 400 m relay | | | | | | |

=== Women ===
| Event | Record | Athlete | Date | Meet | Place | Ref. |
|---|---|---|---|---|---|---|
| 60 m | 7.29 | Isidora Jiménez | 3 February 2018 | Torneo Bajo Techo | São Caetano do Sul, Brazil | |
| 200 m | 23.92 | Isidora Jiménez | 27 January 2019 | | Sabadell, Spain | |
| 400 m | 53.05 | Martina Weil | 1 February 2025 | IFAM Ghent Indoor | Ghent, Belgium | |
| 400 m | 51.67 | Martina Weil | 21 March 2025 | World Championships | Nanjing | |
| 800 m | 2:06.26 | Alejandra Ramos | 5 February 1989 | | Seville, Spain | |
| 1000 m | 2:50.1 h | Alejandra Ramos | 26 February 1988 | | Zaragoza, Spain | |
| 1500 m | 4:17.92 | Alejandra Ramos | 15 March 1991 | | San Sebastián, Spain | |
| 3000 m | 9:15.22 (Note: outdoor mark ratified as absolute record) | Alejandra Ramos | 13 March 1993 | World Championships | Toronto, Canada | |
| 60 m hurdles | 8.40 A | María Ignacia Eguiguren | 1 February 2020 | South American Championships | Cochabamba, Bolivia | |
| High jump | | | | | | |
| Pole vault | 4.10 m | Carolina Torres | 2 March 2003 | | Magglingen, Switzerland | |
| Pole vault | 4.10 m | Carolina Torres | 24 February 2008 | | Saint Gallen, Switzerland | |
| Long jump | 6.29 m A | Rocío Muñoz | 19 February 2022 | South American Championships | Cochabamba, Bolivia | |
| Triple jump | 11.95 m | Macarena Reyes | 13 February 2004 | | Santiago de Chile, Chile | |
| Shot put | 17.24 m | Natalia Duco | 8 March 2014 | World Championships | Sopot, Poland | |
| Pentathlon | | | | | | |
| Pentathlon | 60m H / High jump / Shot put / Long jump / 800m | | | | | |
| 3000 m walk | | | | | | |
| 4 × 400 m relay | | | | | | |
