= Simo Lipsanen =

Finnish triple jumper (born 1995)

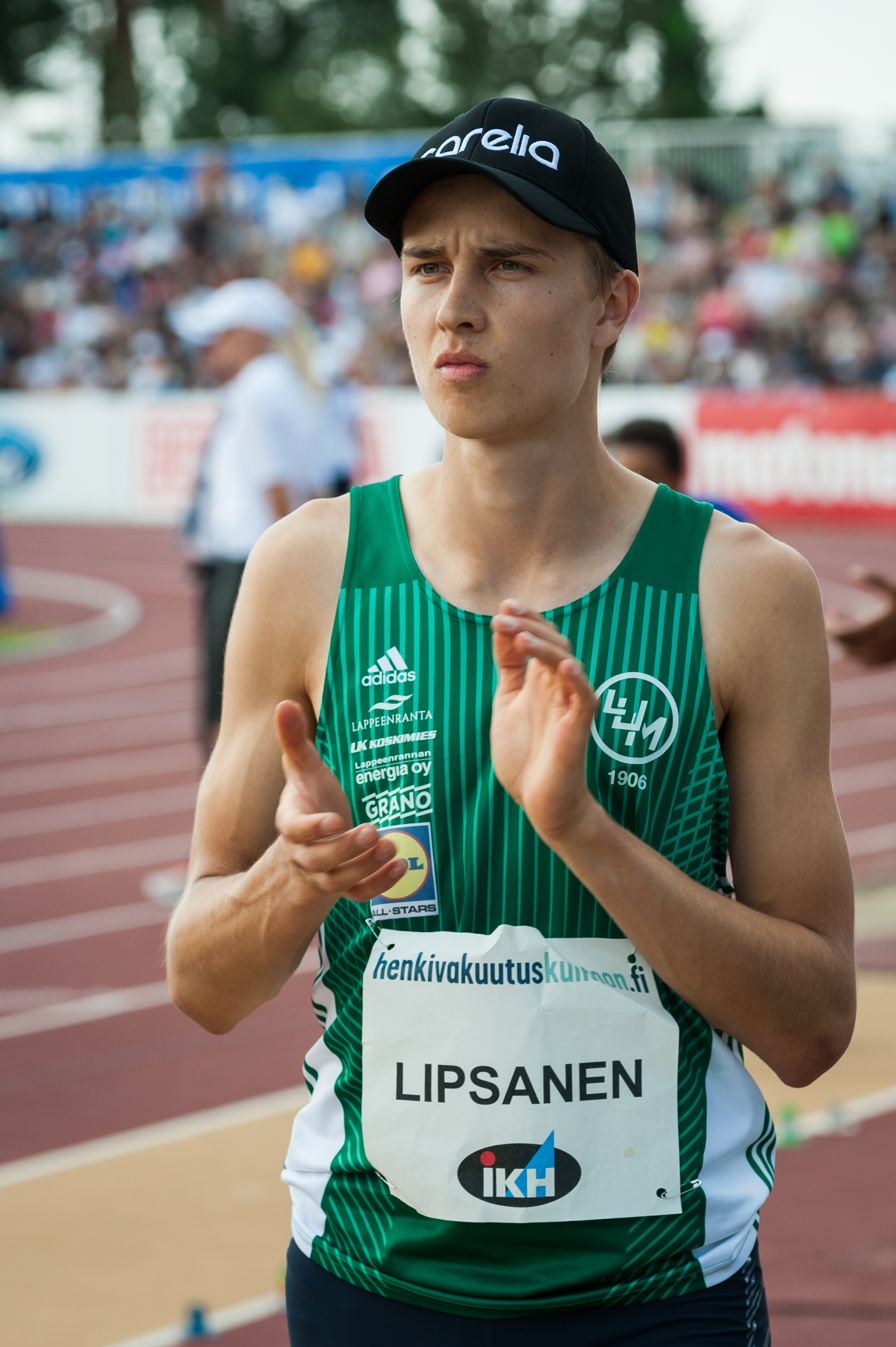
- Lipsanen in 2018

Personal information
- Born: 13 September 1995 (age 30) Lappeenranta, Finland
- Height: 1.91 m (6 ft 3 in)
- Weight: 72 kg (159 lb)

Sport
- Sport: Athletics
- Event: Triple jump
- Club: Lappeenrannan Urheilu-Miehet

Simo Lipsanen (born 13 September 1995 in Lappeenranta) is a Finnish athlete specialising in the triple jump. He represented his country at the 2017 World Championships without reaching the final.

His personal bests in the event are 17.14 metres outdoors (-0.5 m/s, Bydgoszcz 2017) and 16.84 metres indoors (Belgrade 2017). Both are current national records.

== International competitions ==
Year	Competition	Venue	Position	Event	Notes
Representing Finland
2015	European U23 Championships	Tallinn, Estonia	7th	Triple jump	16.02 m
2015	Military World Games	Mungyeong, South Korea	6th	Triple jump	15.85 m
2017	European Indoor Championships	Belgrade, Serbia	7th	Triple jump	16.84 m
2017	European U23 Championships	Bydgoszcz, Poland	2nd	Triple jump	17.14 m
2017	World Championships	London, United Kingdom	17th (q)	Triple jump	16.54 m
2018	European Championships	Berlin, Germany	9th	Triple jump	16.46 m
2019	European Indoor Championships	Glasgow, United Kingdom	9th (q)	Triple jump	16.43 m
2019	World Championships	Doha, Qatar	23rd (q)	Triple jump	16.47 m
2022	European Championships	Munich, Germany	17th (q)	Triple jump	15.93 m
2024	European Championships	Rome, Italy	20th (q)	Triple jump	16.12 m
