= Abdullah Tuğluk =

Turkish long-distance runner (born 1999)

Personal information
- Nationality: Turkey
- Born: 27 June 1999 (age 26) Istanbul, Turkey

Sport
- Sport: Long distance
- Club: Fenerbahçe
Medal record
Men's athletics
Representing Turkey
European Team Championships
Gold medal – first place	2025 Maribor	3000 m sc
Balkan Championships
Silver medal – second place	2024 İzmir	3000 m sc

Abdullah Tuğluk (born 27 June 1999) is a Turkish long-distance runner. He competes in the 3000 m steeplechase and cross country events.

== Personal life ==
Abdullah Tuğluk was born in Istanbul, Turkey on 27 June 1999. He studied at Haliç University in Istanbul.

== Sport career ==
Tuğluk is a member of Fenerbahçe Athletics in Istanbul.

He won the silver medal in the 3000 m steeplechase event with 8:39.44 at the 2024 Balkan Athletics Championships held in İzmir, Turkey.

He captured the gold medal in the 3000 m steeplechase event with 8:45.14 at the 2025 European Athletics Team Championships Second Division in Maribor, Slovenia. He contributed to his team's record with 16 points.
