= Nazim Babayev =

Azerbaijani athlete (born 1997)

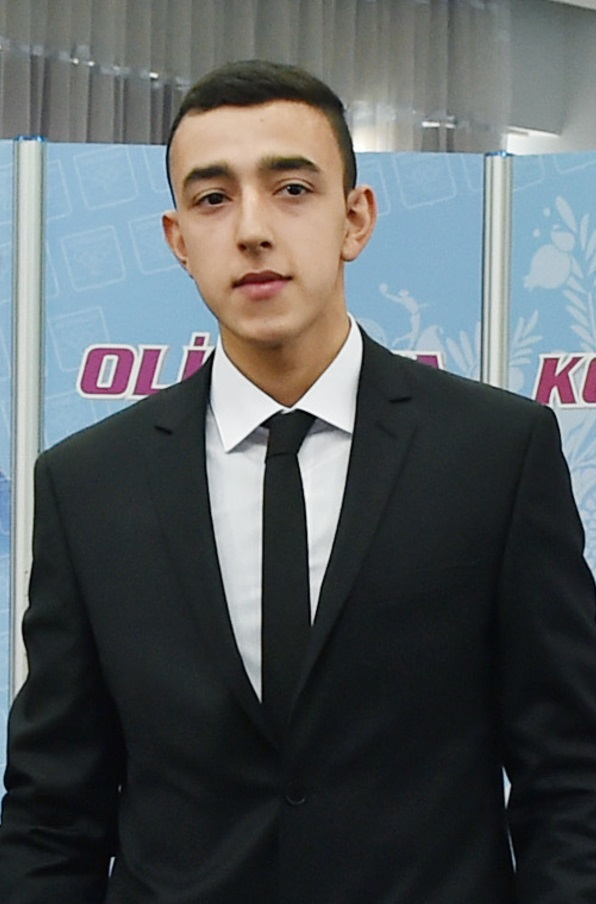
- Nazim Babayev in 2015

Personal information
- Full name: Nazim Tahir oğlu Babayev
- Nationality: Azerbaijani
- Born: 8 October 1997 (age 28) Baku, Azerbaijan
- Education: Physical Culture and Sports Academy in Baku
- Height: 1.87 m (6 ft 2 in)
- Weight: 74 kg (163 lb)

Sport
- Country: Azerbaijan
- Sport: Track and field
- Event: Triple jump
Medal record
European Indoor Championships
Gold medal – first place	2019 Glasgow	Triple jump
Summer Universiade
Gold medal – first place	2017 Taipei	Triple jump
Gold medal – first place	2019 Napoli	Triple jump
Youth Olympic Games
Bronze medal – third place	2014 Nanjing	Triple Jump
European Junior Championships
Gold medal – first place	2015 Eskilstuna	Triple Jump
European U23 Championships
Gold medal – first place	2017 Bydgoszcz	Triple Jump
Islamic Solidarity Games
Gold medal – first place	2017 Baku	Triple Jump

Nazim Tahir oğlu Babayev (born 8 October 1997) is an Azerbaijani track and field athlete who specializes in the triple jump and long jump.

== Biography ==
In 2015, he won the triple jump competition at 2015 European Games in Baku. A month later, Babayev set a championship record, national junior record and world junior lead when he leaped 17.04m in the triple jump at 2015 European Athletics Junior Championships, winning the gold medal. Babayev competed in the men's triple jump in the 2016 Summer Olympics in Rio and the 2020 Summer Olympics in Tokyo.

== Competition record ==
Year	Competition	Venue	Position	Event	Notes
Representing Azerbaijan
2013	European Youth Olympic Festival	Utrecht, Netherlands	1st	Triple jump	15.53 m
2014	Youth Olympic Games	Nanjing, China	3rd	Triple Jump	15.96 m
2015	European Indoor Championships	Prague, Czech Republic	17th (q)	Triple jump	15.92 m
2015	European Junior Championships	Eskilstuna, Sweden	1st	Triple jump	17.04 m
2016	World Indoor Championships	Portland, United States	8th	Triple jump	16.43 m
2016	European Championships	Amsterdam, Netherlands	23rd (q)	Triple jump	16.06 m (w)
2016	World U20 Championships	Bydgoszcz, Poland	15th (q)	Triple jump	15.74 m
2016	Olympic Games	Rio de Janeiro, Brazil	25th (q)	Triple jump	16.38 m
2017	Islamic Solidarity Games	Baku, Azerbaijan	9th	Long jump	7.30 m
2017	Islamic Solidarity Games	Baku, Azerbaijan	1st	Triple jump	17.15 m
2017	European U23 Championships	Bydgoszcz, Poland	1st	Triple jump	17.18 m
2017	World Championships	London, United Kingdom	14th (q)	Triple jump	16.61 m
2017	Universiade	Taipei, Taiwan	1st	Triple jump	17.01 m
2018	European Championships	Berlin, Germany	4th	Triple jump	16.76 m
2019	European Indoor Championships	Glasgow, United Kingdom	1st	Triple jump	17.29 m
2019	Universiade	Naples, Italy	1st	Triple jump	16.89 m
2019	European U23 Championships	Gävle, Sweden	2nd	Triple jump	17.03 m (w)
2019	World Championships	Doha, Qatar	19th (q)	Triple jump	16.65 m
2021	Olympic Games	Tokyo, Japan	15th (q)	Triple jump	16.72 m
2022	World Indoor Championships	Belgrade, Serbia	8th	Triple jump	16.55 m
2022	Islamic Solidarity Games	Konya, Turkey	11th	Long jump	7.15 m
2022	Islamic Solidarity Games	Konya, Turkey	5th	Triple jump	16.06 m
2022	European Championships	Munich, Germany	–	Triple jump	NM
2023	European Indoor Championships	Istanbul, Turkey	5th	Triple jump	16.50 m
2024	European Championships	Rome, Italy	29th (q)	Long jump	6.92 m
2025	Islamic Solidarity Games	Riyadh, Saudi Arabia	5th	Long jump	7.30 m
2025	Islamic Solidarity Games	Riyadh, Saudi Arabia	5th	Triple jump	16.01 m
