= Marcos Ruiz (triple jumper) =

Spanish triple jumper (born 1995)

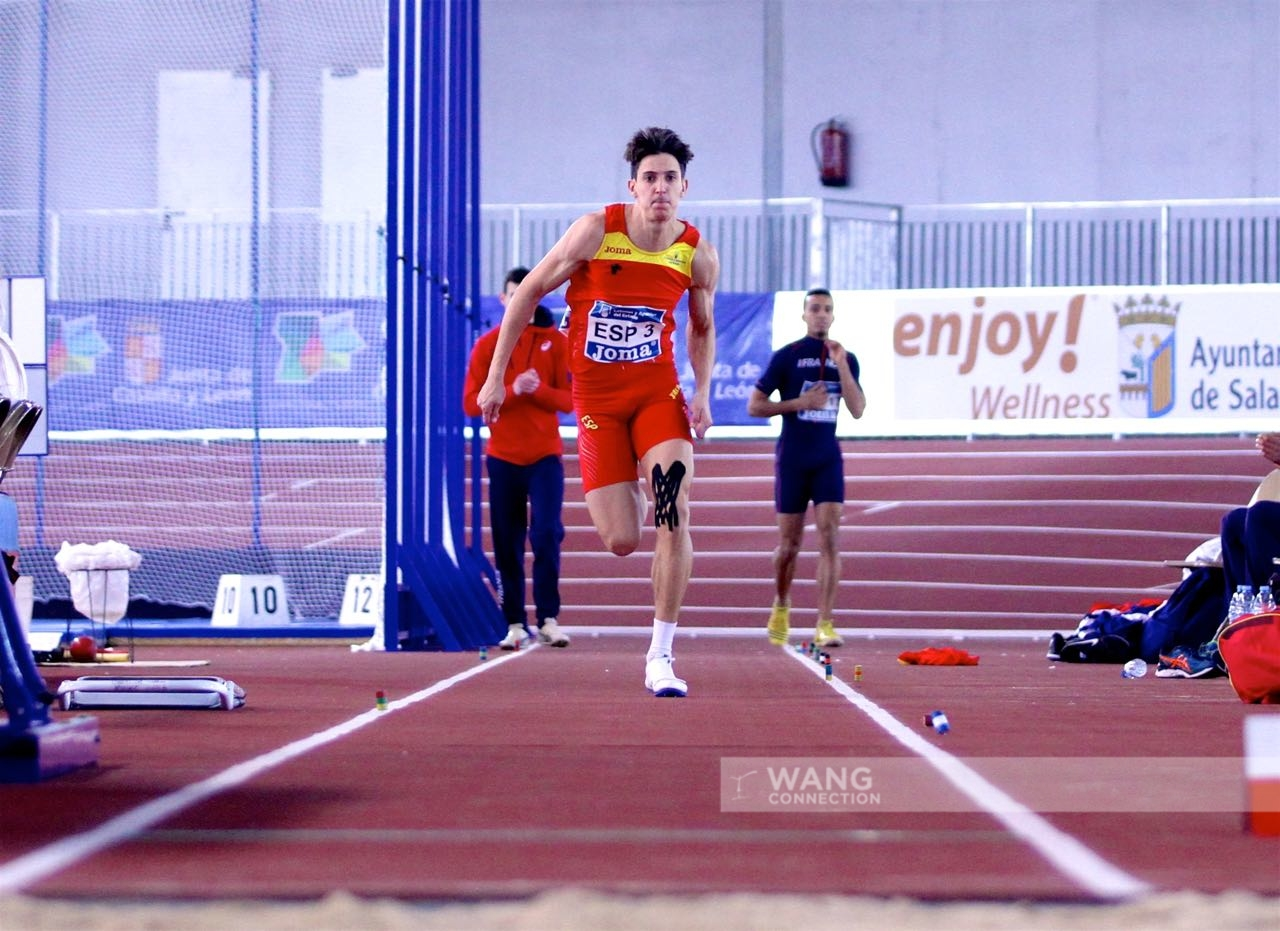

Personal information
- Born: 10 March 1995 (age 31)

Sport
- Sport: Athletics
- Event: Triple jump

Achievements and titles
- Personal best: Triple jump: 16.94m (2022)

Marcos Ruiz Perez (born 10 March 1995) is a Spanish triple jumper. He became Spanish indoor national champion in 2025. He has competed for Spain at major championships, including the 2025 World Athletics Indoor Championships.

== Career ==
He is from La Pobla de Vallbona, in the Valencian Community. He competed as an FC Barcelona athlete, and set a new personal best of 16.44 metres for the triple jump whilst competing in June 2017, the first time he had surpassed 16 metres. He qualified for the final of the 2018 European Athletics Championships in Berlin, Germany where he finished tenth overall with a jump of 16.44 metres.

Over the next few years he was beset by injury and struggled to piece together a six-month period where he stayed problem-free prior to 2022. By then, he had switched to be coached by Antonio Corgos at Centro Alto Rendimiento de Sant Cugat (CAR) in Sant Cugat del Vallès. He set a new personal best, and Catalan record, of 16.85 metres in May 2022. Later that month, he improved it to 16.94 metres in winning the silver medal at the 2022 Ibero-American Championships in La Nucia, behind the Cuban jumper Lázaro Martínez. He finished fifth in the triple jump at the 2022 European Athletics Championships in Munich, Germany in August 2022 with a jump of 16.78 metres, where he was helped in his box by Ivan Pedroso.

He won the Spanish Indoor Athletics Championships in February 2025, in Madrid, with a jump of 16.78 metres. He was selected for the 2025 World Athletics Indoor Championships in Nanjing, China, where he finished twelfth overall with a jump of 16.20 metres.
