= Simone Forte =

Italian male triple jumper

Personal information
- National team: Italy: 3 caps (2018-)
- Born: 20 January 1996 (age 30) Rome
- Height: 181 cm (5 ft 11 in)
- Weight: 73 kg (161 lb)

Sport
- Country: Italy
- Sport: Athletics
- Event: Triple jump
- Club: G.S. Fiamme Gialle
- Coached by: Andrea Matarazzo

Achievements and titles
- Personal best: Triple jump: 17.07 m (2021)

Simone Forte (born 20 January 1996) is an Italian male triple jumper.

== Biography ==
In winter 2019 he was finalists at the 2019 European Athletics Indoor Championships and won his first national title.

== Personal best ==
- Triple jump: 17.07 m ( (Italy) Grosseto, 12 June 2021)
- Triple jump indoor: 16.76 m ( (Italy) Ancona, 17 February 2019)

== National titles ==
- Italian Athletics Indoor Championships
  - Triple jump: 2019

== See also ==
- Italian all-time lists - Triple jump
- Italy at the 2019 European Athletics Indoor Championships
