= 2026 European Athletics Championships – Men's triple jump =

Men's triple jump at the 2026 European Athletics Championships
- Venue: Alexander Stadium
- Location: Birmingham, United Kingdom
- Dates: 12 August 2026 (qualification); 15 August 2026 (final)
- Competitors: 30 (target)
- Winning distance: 18.15 m WL, NR

Medalists
gold medal	Andy Díaz	Italy
silver medal	Pedro Pichardo	Portugal
bronze medal	Andrea Dallavalle	Italy

The men's triple jump at the 2026 European Athletics Championships took place over two rounds at the Alexander Stadium in Birmingham, United Kingdom, on 12 and 15 August 2026.

== Background ==
Records before the 2026 European Athletics Championships
Record	Athlete (nation)	Distance	Location	Date
World record	Jonathan Edwards (GBR)	18.29 m	Gothenburg, Sweden	7 August 1995
European record	Jonathan Edwards (GBR)	18.29 m	Gothenburg, Sweden	7 August 1995
Championship record	Jordan Díaz (ESP)	18.18 m	Rome, Italy	11 June 2024
World leading	Andy Díaz (ITA)	17.87 m	Firenze, Italy	25 July 2026
European leading	Andy Díaz (ITA)	17.87 m	Firenze, Italy	25 July 2026

== Qualification ==
For the men's triple jump, the qualification period was from 27 July 2025 to 26 July 2026. Athletes qualified by achieving the entry standard of 16.80 m or better, by wildcard for the 2024 European Athletics Champion (not used since Jordan Díaz will not participate), or by their position on the World Athletics Rankings for the event. The target number was 30 athletes; eventually only 23 qualified.

Qualification standings per 31 July 2026
QP	CP	Country	Athlete	Status	Details
1	1	Portugal	Pedro Pichardo	Qualified by Entry Standard	17.91 - National Stadium, Tokyo (JPN) - 19 SEP 2025
2	1	Italy	Andy Díaz Hernández	Qualified by Entry Standard	17.87 - Stadio Luigi Ridolfi, Firenze (ITA) - 25 JUL 2026
3	2	Italy	Andrea Dallavalle	Qualified by Entry Standard	17.64 - National Stadium, Tokyo (JPN) - 19 SEP 2025
4	3	Italy	Simone Biasutti	Qualified by Entry Standard	17.32 - Stadio Luigi Ridolfi, Firenze (ITA) - 25 JUL 2026
5	1	France	Jonathan Seremes	Qualified by Entry Standard	17.25 - Randal Tyson Indoor Center, Fayetteville, AR (USA) (i) - 14 MAR 2026
6	2	France	Thomas Gogois	Qualified by Entry Standard	17.02 - Stadium Municipal, Albi (FRA) - 26 JUL 2026
7	1	Austria	Endiorass Kingley	Qualified by Entry Standard	16.85 - National Stadium, Tokyo (JPN) - 17 SEP 2025
8	1	Azerbaijan	Rustam Mammadov	Qualified by Universality Place	
9	1	Turkey	Necati Er	Qualified by World Rankings	11th - 1151 points
10	2	Portugal	Tiago Luis Pereira	Qualified by World Rankings	12th - 1148 points
11	2	Turkey	Can Özüpek	Qualified by World Rankings	13th - 1145 points
12	1	Greece	Nikolaos Andrikopoulos	Qualified by World Rankings	14th - 1134 points
13	2	Greece	Andreas Pantazis	Qualified by World Rankings	16th - 1127 points
reserve	4	Italy	Federico Lorenzo Bruno	Qualified by World Rankings	17th - 1126 points
14	1	Sweden	Gabriel Wallmark	Qualified by World Rankings	19th - 1125 points
15	3	Greece	Dimitrios Tsiamis	Qualified by World Rankings	22nd - 1113 points
16	1	Estonia	Viktor Morozov	Qualified by World Rankings	25th - 1104 points
reserve	5	Italy	Alex Fabbri	Qualified by World Rankings	28th - 1100 points
17	1	Cyprus	Grigoris Nikolaou	Qualified by World Rankings	29th - 1097 points
18	3	Turkey	Mesut Bülbül	Qualified by World Rankings	32nd - 1094 points
19	1	Georgia	Lasha Gulelauri	Qualified by World Rankings	33rd - 1093 points
20	1	Armenia	Razmik Ghazaryan	Qualified by World Rankings	37th - 1089 points
21	1	Hungary	Dániel Szenderffy	Qualified by World Rankings	45th - 1077 points
22	1	Finland	Aaro Davidila	Qualified by World Rankings	46th - 1073 points
23	2	Cyprus	Antranik Sarkis Ashdjian	Qualified by World Rankings	56th - 1059 points

== Schedule ==
Date	Time	Round
12 August 2026	20:40	Qualification.
15 August 2026	20:17	Final

All times are local times (UTC+1)

== Results ==
=== Qualification ===
The qualification round was held on 12 August 2026, at 20:40 in the evening. All athletes meeting the Qualification Standard (Q) of 16.60 m or at least 12 best performers (q) advanced to the final.

==== Group A ====
Place	Athlete	Nation	Round			Result	Notes
Place	Athlete	Nation	#1	#2	#3	Result	Notes
1	Pedro Pichardo	Portugal	17.16 (+0.4 m/s)			17.16 m (+0.4 m/s)	Q, SB
2	Andrea Dallavalle	Italy	16.35 (−1.0 m/s)	16.55 (+0.4 m/s)	-	16.55 m (+0.4 m/s)	q
3	Thomas Gogois	France	16.31 (−1.1 m/s)	x	x	16.31 m (−1.1 m/s)	q
4	Can Özüpek	Turkey	16.05 (−0.8 m/s)	16.30 (+0.6 m/s)	x	16.30 m (+0.6 m/s)	q
5	Mesut BülbüL	Turkey	15.77 (−0.9 m/s)	16.04 (+0.4 m/s)	16.08 (+0.1 m/s)	16.08 m (+0.1 m/s)	q
6	Razmik Ghazaryan	Armenia	15.38 (−0.7 m/s)	15.98 (+0.5 m/s)	15.75 (−0.4 m/s)	15.98 m (+0.5 m/s)	
7	Andreas Pantazis	Greece	15.94 (−0.8 m/s)	x	15.86 (−0.2 m/s)	15.94 m (−0.8 m/s)	
8	Gabriel Wallmark	Sweden	15.56 (+0.4 m/s)	15.89 (±0.0 m/s)	15.73 (−0.9 m/s)	15.89 m (±0.0 m/s)	
9	Grigoris Nikolaou	Cyprus	14.40 (−1.0 m/s)	x	15.77 (−0.6 m/s)	15.77 m (−0.6 m/s)	
10	Rustam Mammadov	Azerbaijan	15.44 (+0.2 m/s)	15.71 (+0.1 m/s)	x	15.71 m (+0.1 m/s)	
11	Aaro Davidila	Finland	15.48 (−0.7 m/s)	15.68 (+0.1 m/s)	x	15.68 m (+0.1 m/s)	
12	Nikolaos Andrikopoulos	Greece	15.54 (−0.9 m/s)	x	x	15.54 m (−0.9 m/s)	

==== Group B ====
Place	Athlete	Nation	Round			Result	Notes
Place	Athlete	Nation	#1	#2	#3	Result	Notes
1	Andy Díaz	Italy	17.05 (−0.2 m/s)			17.05 m (−0.2 m/s)	Q
2	Simone Biasutti	Italy	16.71 (−0.4 m/s)			16.71 m (−0.4 m/s)	Q
3	Jonathan Seremes	France	16.38 (−0.5 m/s)	16.47 (+0.9 m/s)	x	16.47 m (+0.9 m/s)	q
4	Necati Er	Turkey	15.75 (+0.4 m/s)	16.02 (+0.7 m/s)	16.45 (+0.5 m/s)	16.45 m (+0.5 m/s)	q
5	Endiorass Kingley	Austria	x	16.19 (+0.8 m/s)	16.25 (+0.4 m/s)	16.25 m (+0.4 m/s)	q
6	Dimitrios Tsiamis	Greece	16.12 (−0.1 m/s)	x	15.96 (+0.5 m/s)	16.12 m (−0.1 m/s)	q
7	Dániel Szenderffy	Hungary	x	16.06 (+0.5 m/s)	15.73 (+0.6 m/s)	16.06 m (+0.5 m/s)	q
8	Tiago Pereira	Portugal	15.90 (−0.1 m/s)	15.95 (+0.5 m/s)	x	15.95 m (+0.5 m/s)	SB
9	Viktor Morozov	Estonia	15.32 (−0.4 m/s)	15.85 (+0.8 m/s)	15.59 (+0.8 m/s)	15.85 m (+0.8 m/s)	
10	Antranik Sarkis Ashdjian	Cyprus	15.45 (+0.7 m/s)	15.00 (+0.4 m/s)	15.03 (+0.2 m/s)	15.45 m (+0.7 m/s)	
11	Lasha Gulelauri	Georgia	14.83 (±0.0 m/s)	15.39 (+0.7 m/s)	x	15.39 m (+0.7 m/s)	

=== Final ===
The final was held on 15 August 2026, at 20:17 in the evening.

Place	Athlete	Nation	Round						Result	Notes
Place	Athlete	Nation	#1	#2	#3	#4	#5	#6	Result	Notes
1st place, gold medalist(s)	Andy Díaz Hernández	Italy	x	18.15 (+1.7 m/s)	17.78 (+2.4 m/s)	-	x	x	18.15 m (+1.7 m/s)	WL, NR
2nd place, silver medalist(s)	Pedro Pichardo	Portugal	17.76 (+0.8 m/s)	17.50 (+1.8 m/s)	16.99 (+1.3 m/s)	-	-	-	17.76 m (+0.8 m/s)	SB
3rd place, bronze medalist(s)	Andrea Dallavalle	Italy	17.37 (+0.9 m/s)	x	x	17.16 (+2.0 m/s)	16.83 (+0.6 m/s)	-	17.37 m (+0.9 m/s)	
4	Thomas Gogois	France	x	x	16.55 (+1.0 m/s)	x	16.59 (+1.0 m/s)	17.21 (+2.1 m/s)	17.21 m (+2.1 m/s)	
5	Can Özüpek	Turkey	16.73 (+2.0 m/s)	16.58 (+1.7 m/s)	16.52 (+1.1 m/s)	16.28 (+0.8 m/s)	-	x	16.73 m (+2.0 m/s)	SB
6	Endiorass Kingley	Austria	16.28 (+1.9 m/s)	16.55 (+2.7 m/s)	16.57 (+3.3 m/s)	16.20 (+1.4 m/s)	x	15.66 (+1.3 m/s)	16.57 m (+3.3 m/s)	
7	Jonathan Seremes	France	15.58 (+2.2 m/s)	16.31 (+1.9 m/s)	16.09 (+1.4 m/s)	16.24 (+1.4 m/s)	x	x	16.31 m (+1.9 m/s)	
8	Dimitrios Tsiamis	Greece	16.27 (+1.6 m/s)	x	x	x	x	x	16.27 m (+1.6 m/s)	
9	Mesut BülbüL	Turkey	13.81 (+2.4 m/s)	x	15.93 (+1.0 m/s)				15.93 m (+1.0 m/s)	
10	Dániel Szenderffy	Hungary	15.88 (+1.5 m/s)	x	15.75 (+2.2 m/s)				15.88 m (+1.5 m/s)	
11	Necati Er	Turkey	15.77 (+1.6 m/s)	r					15.77 m (+1.6 m/s)	
—	Simone Biasutti	Italy	x	r					NM	
