= 2025 European Athletics Indoor Championships – Men's triple jump =

Men's triple jump at the 2025 European Athletics Indoor Championships
- Venue: Omnisport Apeldoorn
- Location: Apeldoorn, Netherlands
- Dates: 7 March 2025 (qualification); 8 March 2025 (final)
- Competitors: 18 from 15 nations
- Winning mark: 17.71 WL

Medalists
| gold medal | Andy Díaz | Italy |
| silver medal | Max Heß | Germany |
| bronze medal | Andrea Dallavalle | Italy |

The men's triple jump at the 2025 European Athletics Indoor Championships was held on the short track of Omnisport in Apeldoorn, Netherlands, on 6 and 7 March 2025. This was the 38th time the event was contested at the European Athletics Indoor Championships. Athletes can qualify by achieving the entry standard or by their World Athletics Ranking in the event.

The qualifying round is scheduled for 7 March during the morning session. The final is scheduled for 8 March during the evening session.

== Background ==
The men's triple jump was contested 37 times before 2025, at every previous edition of the European Athletics Indoor Championships (1970–2023). The 2025 European Athletics Indoor Championships will be held in Omnisport Apeldoorn in Apeldoorn, Netherlands. The removable indoor athletics track was retopped for these championships in September 2024.

Hugues Fabrice Zango is the world record holder in the event, with a distance of 18.07 m, set in 2024. Teddy Tamgho holds the European record, with a mark of 17.92 m, set at the 2011 championships.

Records before the 2025 European Athletics Indoor Championships
| Record | Athlete (nation) | Distance (m) | Location | Date |
|---|---|---|---|---|
| World record | Hugues Fabrice Zango (BUR) | 18.07 | Aubière, France | 16 January 2021 |
| European record | Teddy Tamgho (FRA) | 17.92 | Paris, France | 6 March 2011 |
| Championship record | Teddy Tamgho (FRA) | 17.92 | Paris, France | 6 March 2011 |
| World leading | Max Heß (GER) | 17.41 | Metz, France | 8 February 2025 |
| European leading | Max Heß (GER) | 17.41 | Metz, France | 8 February 2025 |

== Qualification ==
For the men's triple jump, the qualification period runs from 25 February 2024 until 23 February 2025. Athletes can qualify by achieving the entry standards of 17.00 m or by virtue of their World Athletics Ranking for the event. There is a target number of 18 athletes.

== Rounds ==
=== Qualification ===
The qualifying round was held on 7 March, starting at 13:45 (UTC+1) in the afternoon. All athletes meeting the Qualification Standard of 16.70 m (Q) or at least 8 best performers (q) advanced to the final.

Results of the qualification round
| Rank | Athlete | Nation | #1 | #2 | #3 | Result | Notes | PB |
|---|---|---|---|---|---|---|---|---|
| 1 | Andrea Dallavalle | Italy | 16.87 | | | 16.87 | Q | 17.36 |
| 2 | Andy Díaz | Italy | 16.74 | | | 16.74 | Q | 17.75 |
| 3 | Max Heß | Germany | 16.72 | | | 16.72 | Q | 17.52 |
| 4 | Tiago Pereira | Portugal | x | x | 16.50 | 16.50 | q, SB | 17.11 |
| 5 | Thomas Gogois | France | 16.43 | 16.45 | x | 16.45 | q | 17.38 |
| 6 | Can Özüpek | Turkey | 16.19 | 16.03 | 16.29 | 16.29 | q | 16.77 |
| 7 | Melvin Raffin | France | x | 14.25 | 16.29 | 16.29 | q | 17.20 |
| 8 | Rustam Mammadov | Azerbaijan | 15.52 | 15.71 | 16.28 | 16.28 | q | 16.54 |
| 9 | Endiorass Kingley | Austria | x | 16.12 | 16.25 | 16.25 | SB | 16.37 |
| 10 | Vladyslav Shepeliev | Ukraine | x | 15.94 | x | 15.94 | | 16.79 |
| 10 | Tomáš Veszelka | Slovakia | 15.94 | x | x | 15.94 | SB | 17.09 |
| 12 | Simone Biasutti | Italy | 15.90 | x | x | 15.90 | | 16.67 |
| 13 | Dimitrios Tsiamis | Greece | 15.63 | 15.61 | 15.86 | 15.86 | | 17.55 |
| 14 | Gabriel Wallmark | Sweden | 15.48 | 15.80 | 15.59 | 15.80 | | 16.43 |
| 15 | Tuomas Kaukolahti | Finland | 15.39 | 15.71 | x | 15.71 | SB | 16.50 |
| 16 | Efe Uwaifo | Great Britain | x | 15.66 | 15.34 | 15.66 | | 16.22 |
| 17 | Răzvan Cristian Grecu | Romania | x | 15.66 | x | 15.66 | | 16.83 |
| | Lâchezar Vâlchev | Bulgaria | x | x | x | NM | | 16.17 |

=== Final ===
The final was held on 8 March, starting at 18:40 (UTC+1) in the evening.

Result of the final
| Rank | Athlete | Nation | #1 | #2 | #3 | #4 | #5 | #6 | Result | Notes |
|---|---|---|---|---|---|---|---|---|---|---|
| 1st place, gold medalist(s) | Andy Díaz | Italy | 16.37 | x | 17.05 | – | 17.71 | x | 17.71 | WL |
| 2nd place, silver medalist(s) | Max Heß | Germany | 17.43 | x | – | x | 13.90 | x | 17.43 | SB |
| 3rd place, bronze medalist(s) | Andrea Dallavalle | Italy | 17.00 | x | 17.19 | – | 16.84 | 14.35 | 17.19 | |
| 4 | Thomas Gogois | France | x | 16.51 | x | x | – | x | 16.51 | |
| 5 | Tiago Pereira | Portugal | x | 16.01 | x | x | 16.45 | x | 16.45 | |
| 6 | Rustam Mammadov | Azerbaijan | 16.10 | x | 16.16 | 16.01 | 16.11 | 16.40 | 16.40 | |
| 7 | Can Özüpek | Turkey | 15.82 | 16.05 | 16.11 | – | x | 16.29 | 16.29 | |
| 8 | Melvin Raffin | France | x | x | x | 16.08 | 14.48 | x | 16.08 | |
