= Greece at the 2022 European Championships =

in (Germany) Munich 11 August 2022 – 22 August 2022
- Competitors: 75 in 8 sports
- Medals Ranked 10th: Gold 6 Silver 4 Bronze 0 Total 10

European Championships appearances
- 2018; 2022

Greece will compete at the 2022 European Championships in Munich from August 11 to August 22, 2022.

== Medalists ==
Medal	Name	Sport	Event	Date
Gold	Antonios Papakonstantinou	Rowing	Men's lightweight single sculls	14 August
Gold	Antigoni Ntrismpioti	Athletics	Women's 35 kilometres walk	16 August
Gold	Miltiadis Tentoglou	Athletics	Men's long jump	16 August
Gold	Antigoni Ntrismpioti	Athletics	Women's 20 kilometres walk	20 August
Gold	Elina Tzengko	Athletics	Women's javelin throw	20 August
Gold	Eleftherios Petrounias	Gymnastics	Men's rings	21 August
Silver	Zoi Fitsiou	Rowing	Women's lightweight single sculls	14 August
Silver	Evangelia Anastasiadou	Rowing	Women's single sculls	14 August
Silver	Stefanos Ntouskos	Rowing	Men's single sculls	14 August
Silver	Ekaterini Stefanidi	Athletics	Women's pole vault	16 August

== Competitors ==
The following is the list of number of competitors in the Championships:

Sport	Men	Women	Total
Athletics	15	24	39
Gymnastics (men and women)	5	5	10
Canoe sprint	2	0	2
Cycling road	3	0	3
Cycling track	0	1	1
Rowing	4	7	11
Sport climbing	1	1	2
Table tennis	4	3	7
Total	34	41	75

== Athletics ==
=== Men ===
Track & road events

Athlete	Event	Heat		Semifinal		Final	
Athlete	Event	Result	Rank	Result	Rank	Result	Rank
Panagiotis Trivyzas	200 m	21.00	19	did not advance			
Konstadinos Zikos; Ioannis Nyfantopoulos; Panagiotis Trivyzas; Theodoros Vrontinos	4 × 100 m relay	39.11	10	—N/a		did not advance	
Alexandros Papamichail	35 km walk	—N/a				DNF	

Field events

Athlete	Event	Qualification		Final	
Athlete	Event	Distance	Rank	Distance	Rank
Antonios Merlos	High jump	2.17	14	did not advance	
Emmanouil Karalis	Pole vault	5.50	13	did not advance	
Miltiadis Tentoglou	Long jump	7.94	2 q	8.52 CR	1st place, gold medalist(s)
Dimitrios Tsiamis	Triple jump	15.99	15	did not advance	
Andreas Pantazis	Triple jump	15.86	18	did not advance	
Nikolaos Andrikopoulos	Triple jump	15.39	19	did not advance	
Mihail Anastasakis	Hammer throw	70.84	did not advance		
Christos Frantzeskakis	Hammer throw	76.33	8 q	78.20 PB	6

=== Women ===
Track & road events

Athlete	Event	Heat		Semifinal		Final	
Athlete	Event	Result	Rank	Result	Rank	Result	Rank
Rafailía Spanoudaki-Hatziriga	100 m	11.62	19	did not advance			
Artemis Anastasiou	200 m	23.38	13 Q	23.60	19	did not advance	
Elisavet Pesiridou	100 m hurdles	13.33	9 Q	13.19	17	did not advance	
Dimitra Gnafaki	400 m hurdles	56.45 PB	6 Q	56.14 PB	13	did not advance	
Styliani-Alexandra Michailidou; Elisavet Pesiridou; Artemis Melina Anastasiou; Rafailía Spanoudaki-Hatziriga	4 × 100 m relay	44.58	13	—N/a		did not advance	
Korina Politi; Andrianna Ferra; Despoina Mourta; Dimitra Gnafaki	4 × 400 m relay	3.33.33 SB	14	—N/a		did not advance	
Kiriaki Filtisakou	35 km walk	—N/a				did not finish	
Efstathia Kourkoutsaki	35 km walk	—N/a				3:07:42	16
Antigoni Drisbioti	35 km walk	—N/a				2:47:00 CR	1st place, gold medalist(s)
Antigoni Drisbioti	20 km walk	—N/a				1:29:03 PB	1st place, gold medalist(s)
Christina Papadopoulou	20 km walk	—N/a				1:35:19 SB	12

Field events

Athlete	Event	Qualification		Final	
Athlete	Event	Distance	Rank	Distance	Rank
Katerina Stefanidi	Pole vault	4.50	2 q	4.75 SB	2nd place, silver medalist(s)
Eleni-Klaoudia Polak	Pole vault	4.40	17	did not advance	
Tatiana Gousin	High jump	1.87	5 q	1.86	9
Vasiliki Chaitidou	Long jump	6.32	16	did not advance	
Spyridoula Karydi	Triple jump	13.71	12 q	13.54	9
Stamatia Skarvelis	Hammer throw	67.13	17	did not advance	
Hrisoula Anagnostopoulou	Discus throw	58.13	10 q	56.10	12
Elina Tzengko	Javelin throw	61.28	2 Q	65.81 PB	1st place, gold medalist(s)

Key

- Q = Qualified for the next round
- q = Qualified for the next round as a fastest loser or, in field events, by position without achieving the qualifying target
- NR = National record
- N/A = Round not applicable for the event
- Bye = Athlete not required to compete in round

== Canoeing ==
Men

Athlete	Event	Heats		Semifinals		Final	
Athlete	Event	Time	Rank	Time	Rank	Time	Rank
Stefanos Dimopoulos	C-1 200 m	42.680	6 SF	42.166	8	Did not advance	14
Stefanos Dimopoulos	C-1 500 m	1:57.850	6 SF	1:53.918	5 FB	1:54.749	15
Christos Matsas	K-1 200 m	39.047	9	Did not advance			17

== Cycling ==
=== Road ===
Men

Athlete	Event	Time	Rank
Georgios Bouglas	Road race	4:39:07	49
Panagiotis Christopoulos-Cheller	Road race	4:39:35	75
Periklis Ilias	Road race	4:40:34	86

=== Track ===
Elimination race

Athlete	Event	Final
Athlete	Event	Rank
Argyro Milaki	Women's elimination race	10

Omnium

Athlete	Event	Qualification		Scratch Race		Tempo Race		Elimination Race		Points Race		Total points	Rank
Athlete	Event	Rank	Points	Rank	Points	Rank	Points	Rank	Points	Rank	Points	Total points	Rank
Argyro Milaki	Women's omnium	—N/a		18	6	18	6	17	8	DNF			

Scratch

Athlete	Event	Final	
Athlete	Event	Laps down	Rank
Argyro Milaki	Women's scratch	0	10

== Gymnastics ==
Greece has entered five male and five female athletes.

=== Men ===
Qualification

Athlete	Event	Qualification								Final							
Athlete	Event	Apparatus						Total	Rank	Apparatus						Total	Rank
Athlete	Event	F	PH	R	V	PB	HB	Total	Rank	F	PH	R	V	PB	HB	Total	Rank
Stavros Gkinis	Team	12.666	6.966	13.100	12.833	13.066	12.500	71.131	68	Did not advance							
Apostolos Kanellos	Team	12.566	11.733	11.066	12.933	12.966	12.633	73.897	56	Did not advance							
Georgios Kelesidis	Team	—N/a	12.200	—N/a		12.333	12.000	—N/a		Did not advance							
Nikolaos Kranitis	Team	11.800	10.800	12.800	13.900	10.866	12.233	72.399	63	Did not advance							
Eleftherios Petrounias	Team	—N/a		15.100 Q	—N/a					Did not advance							
Total	Team	37.032	34.733	41.000	39.666	38.365	37.366	228.162	21	Did not advance							

Individual finals

Athlete	Event	Apparatus						Total	Rank
Athlete	Event	F	PH	R	V	PB	HB	Total	Rank
Eleftherios Petrounias	Rings	—N/a		15.133	—N/a			15.133	1st place, gold medalist(s)

=== Women ===
Qualification

Athlete	Event	Qualification						Final					
Athlete	Event	Apparatus				Total	Rank	Apparatus				Total	Rank
Athlete	Event	V	UB	BB	F	Total	Rank	V	UB	BB	F	Total	Rank
Elvira Katsali	Team	11.766	11.400	10.400	12.000	45.566	60	Did not advance					
Christina Kiosi	Team	12.300	—N/a	11.866	11.800	—N/a		Did not advance					
Konstantina Maragkou	Team	—N/a	10.433	11.100	11.300	—N/a		Did not advance					
Areti Pagoni	Team	11.566	10.533	9.666	10.700	42.465	75	Did not advance					
Christina Vasilopoulou	Team	9.966	9.133	—N/a				Did not advance					
Total	Team	35.632	32.366	33.366	35.100	136.464	26	Did not advance					

== Rowing ==
Men

Athlete	Event	Heats		Repechage		Semifinals		Final	
Athlete	Event	Time	Rank	Time	Rank	Time	Rank	Time	Rank
Stefanos Ntouskos	Single sculls	7:41.36	1 SA/B	—N/a		7:14.02	2 FA	7:15.01	2nd place, silver medalist(s)
Ioannis Kalandaridis; Athanasios Palaiopanos	Double sculls	6:54.95	2 SA/B	Bye		6:40.64	2 FA	6:53.39	5
Antonios Papakonstantinou	Lightweight single sculls	7:45.47	1 SA/B	Bye		7:11.98	1 FA	7:21.84	1st place, gold medalist(s)

Women

Athlete	Event	Heats		Repechage		Semifinals		Final	
Athlete	Event	Time	Rank	Time	Rank	Time	Rank	Time	Rank
Evangelia Anastasiadou	Single sculls	8:43.50	1 SA/B	—N/a		8:11.74	3 FA	8:08.20	2nd place, silver medalist(s)
Evangelia Fragkou; Christina Bourmpou	Coxless pair	7:59.26	3 R	7:44.63	2 FA	—N/a		7:52.21	6
Zoi Fitsiou	Lightweight single sculls	8:46.58	3 R	8:15.85	1 FA	—N/a		8:09.21	2nd place, silver medalist(s)

== Sport climbing ==
Boulder

Athlete	Event	Qualification		Semifinal		Final	
Athlete	Event	Result	Rank	Result	Rank	Result	Rank
Ioannis-Filippos Noel-Baker	Men's boulder	0T0z 0 0	59	Did not advance			
Evdoxia-Aikaterini Kallia	Women's boulder	0T1z 0 3	49	Did not advance			
