= 2018 IAAF World U20 Championships – Men's triple jump =

Men's triple jump at the 2018 World U20 Championships
- Venue: Ratina Stadium
- Dates: 13 July (qualification); 14 July (final)
- Competitors: 23 from 18 nations
- Winning distance: 17.15 m

Medalists
gold medal	Jordan Díaz	Cuba
silver medal	Martin Lamou	France
bronze medal	Jonathan Seremes	France

The men's triple jump at the 2018 IAAF World U20 Championships was held at Ratina Stadium on 13 and 14 July.

== Records ==
Standing records prior to the 2018 IAAF World U20 Championships in Athletics
World U20 Record	Volker Mai (GDR)	17.50	Erfurt, East Germany	23 June 1985
Championship Record	Lázaro Martínez (CUB)	17.13	Eugene, United States	27 July 2014
World U20 Leading	Jordan Díaz (CUB)	17.41	Havana, Cuba	8 June 2018

== Results ==
=== Qualification ===
The qualification round took place on 13 July, in two groups, with both groups starting at 18:00. Athletes attaining a mark of at least 15.80 metres ( Q ) or at least the 12 best performers ( q ) qualified for the final.

Rank	Group	Name	Nationality	Round			Mark	Notes
Rank	Group	Name	Nationality	1	2	3	Mark	Notes
1	B	Jordan Díaz	Cuba	17.09			17.09	Q
2	A	Martin Lamou	France	x	16.26		16.26	Q
3	A	Kangaraj Kamalraj	India	15.98			15.98	Q, SB
4	B	Aramayis Sargsyan	Armenia	15.68	15.94		15.94	Q, PB
5	B	Kevín Canchingre	Ecuador	14.80	15.86		15.86	Q, PB
6	B	Jonathan Seremes	France	15.85			15.85	Q, PB
7	A	Lin Qinwei	China	15.80			15.80	Q, PB
8	A	Simone Biasutti	Italy	15.70	14.92	15.33	15.70	q, PB
9	A	Yuki Akiyama	Japan	x	14.74	15.70	15.70	q
10	B	Philip Musyoka Mwema	Kenya	15.69	15.68	15.22	15.69	q
11	B	Alexandru Vişan	Romania	x	15.69	15.52	15.69	q
12	B	Zhang Zhanfei	China	14.60	15.34	15.68	15.68	q
13	A	Artem Konovalenko	Ukraine	15.67	x	x	15.67	
14	A	Răzvan Grecu	Romania	15.63	15.48	15.65	15.65	SB
15	A	Johnny Montenegro	Colombia	15.63	15.05	15.56	15.63	
16	A	Frixon Chila	Ecuador	15.57	x	15.29	15.57	
17	A	Christian Edwards	United States	15.53	x	14.74	15.53	
18	B	Jonathan Edward Miller	Barbados	x	x	15.46	15.46	
19	B	Artur Malyshenko	Ukraine	15.44	15.30	15.26	15.44	
20	A	Iikka Alingué	Finland	14.96	x	15.11	15.11	
21	B	Batuhan Çakir	Turkey	14.83	14.79	14.82	14.83	
22	A	Owayne Owens	Jamaica	x	x	14.79	14.79	
	A	Andreas Pantazis	Greece	x	x	x	NM	

=== Final ===
The final was held on 14 July at 15:00.

Rank	Name	Nationality	Round						Mark	Notes
Rank	Name	Nationality	1	2	3	4	5	6	Mark	Notes
1st place, gold medalist(s)	Jordan Díaz	Cuba	16.84	16.91	17.15	x	17.15	x	17.15	CR
2nd place, silver medalist(s)	Martin Lamou	France	16.44	x	r				16.44	
3rd place, bronze medalist(s)	Jonathan Seremes	France	x	15.68	16.04	x	16.18	15.94	16.18	PB
4	Aramayis Sargsyan	Armenia	x	14.78	15.89	15.01	x	14.42	15.89	
5	Kangaraj Kamalraj	India	15.56	x	15.82	x	x	x	15.82	
6	Alexandru Vişan	Romania	15.21	x	15.72	x	15.24	15.71	15.72	
7	Lin Qinwei	China	15.45	15.60	15.71	15.35	x	14.43	15.71	
8	Philip Musyoka Mwema	Kenya	15.45	15.70	15.30	15.59	15.31	15.41	15.70	
9	Zhang Zhanfei	China	x	15.61	15.27				15.61	
10	Yuki Akiyama	Japan	15.40	15.28	14.98				15.40	
11	Kevín Canchingre	Ecuador	x	15.23	14.94				15.23	
12	Simone Biasutti	Italy	x	x	15.16				15.16	
