= 2021 European Athletics U23 Championships – Men's triple jump =

Men's triple jump at the 2021 European Athletics U23 Championships
- Venue: Kadriorg Stadium, Tallinn
- Dates: 10–11 July
- Competitors: 22 from 15 nations
- Winning distance: 17.05

Medalists
gold medal	Andrea Dallavalle	Italy
silver medal	Enzo Hodebar	France
bronze medal	Anaël-Thomas Gogois	France

The men's triple jump event at the 2021 European Athletics U23 Championships was held in Tallinn, Estonia, at Kadriorg Stadium on 10 and 11 July.

== Records ==
Prior to the competition, the records were as follows:

European U23 record	Teddy Tamgho (FRA)	17.98	New York City, United States	12 June 2010
Championship U23 record	Sheryf El-Sheryf (UKR)	17.72	Ostrava, Czech Republic	17 July 2011

== Results ==
=== Qualification ===
Qualification rule: 16.30 (Q) or the 12 best results (q) qualified for the final.

Rank	Group	Name	Nationality	#1	#2	#3	Results	Notes
1	B	Andrea Dallavalle	Italy	16.47			16.47	Q
1	A	Anaël-Thomas Gogois	France	16.47			16.47	Q
3	B	Enzo Hodebar	France	16.46			16.46	Q
4	A	Simone Biasutti	Italy	16.24	r		16.24	q
4	B	Maksym Vanyaikin	Ukraine	x	16.24	–	16.24	q
6	A	Andreas Pantazis	Greece	x	16.20	x	16.20	q
7	B	Georgi Nachev	Bulgaria	16.06	–	–	16.06	q
8	A	Rustam Mammadov	Azerbaijan	15.78	14.41	16.04	16.04	q, SB
9	B	Jonathan Seremes	France	x	16.01	15.66	16.01	q
10	B	Eneko Carrascal	Spain	15.76	15.68	15.97	15.97	q
11	B	Siarhei Dziambitski	Belarus	x	15.93	x	15.93	q, PB
12	A	Artem Konovalenko	Ukraine	x	15.90	x	15.90	q
13	A	Yahor Chuiko	Belarus	15.81	15.59	15.87	15.87	
14	B	Aliaksandr Dzikun	Belarus	15.18	14.84	15.60	15.60	
15	A	Dániel Szenderffy	Hungary	x	15.46	15.47	15.47	
16	B	Vadim Doscalov	Moldova	x	15.44	x	15.44	SB
16	A	Vladyslav Shepeliev	Ukraine	x	x	15.44	15.44	
18	B	Dawid Krzemiński	Poland	x	x	15.36	15.36	
19	B	Răzvan Cristian Grecu	Romania	x	x	15.24	15.24	SB
20	A	Tine Šuligoj	Slovenia	x	15.23	x	15.23	
21	A	Gustas Griška	Lithuania	15.09	x	x	15.09	
22	B	Aramayis Sargsyan	Armenia	x	x	14.08	14.08	
	A	Florin Alexandru Vișan	Romania	DNS				

=== Final ===
Rank	Name	Nationality	#1	#2	#3	#4	#5	#6	Result	Notes
1st place, gold medalist(s)	Andrea Dallavalle	Italy	16.90	16.69	17.05	–	–	x	17.05	
2nd place, silver medalist(s)	Enzo Hodebar	France	16.60	16.99	15.75	x	15.17	x	16.99	PB
3rd place, bronze medalist(s)	Anaël-Thomas Gogois	France	16.40	16.57	x	16.21	16.65	x	16.65	
4	Jonathan Seremes	France	15.71	15.77	x	15.96	16.21	15.75	16.21	SB
5	Andreas Pantazis	Greece	16.04	x	16.09	16.12	x	–	16.12	
6	Simone Biasutti	Italy	x	x	15.90	x	16.00	14.92	16.00	
7	Maksym Vanyaikin	Ukraine	x	x	15.82	–	13.87	x	15.82	
8	Siarhei Dziambitski	Belarus	15.74	x	14.93	14.44	14.80	14.78	15.74	
9	Eneko Carrascal	Spain	15.24	15.61	x				15.61	
10	Georgi Nachev	Bulgaria	15.09	x	15.60				15.60	
11	Rustam Mammadov	Azerbaijan	x	15.54	15.40				15.54	
	Artem Konovalenko	Ukraine	x	x	x				NM	
