= 2019 European Athletics U23 Championships – Men's triple jump =

The men's triple jump event at the 2019 European Athletics U23 Championships will be held in Gävle, Sweden, at Gavlehov Stadium Park on 13 and 14 July.

== Medalists ==
Gold	Silver	Bronze
Necati Er; Turkey	Nazim Babayev; Azerbaijan	Andrea Dallavalle; Italy

== Results ==
=== Qualification ===
Qualification rule: 16.30 (Q) or the 12 best results (q) qualified for the final.

Rank	Group	Name	Nationality	#1	#2	#3	Results	Notes
1	A	Necati Er	Turkey	x	17.05		17.05	Q, NR
2	A	Nazim Babayev	Azerbaijan	16.78			16.78	Q
3	A	Tobia Bocchi	Italy	16.73			16.73	Q, PB
4	B	Răzvan Cristian Grecu	Romania	15.98	16.37		16.37	Q, SB
5	A	Andrea Dallavalle	Italy	15.88	16.32		16.32	Q
6	A	Florin Alexandru Vișan	Romania	x	x	16.30	16.30	Q, PB
7	A	Enzo Hodebar	France	16.08	16.12	15.64	16.12	q
8	A	Ondřej Vodák	Czech Republic	15.67	15.75	15.99	15.99	q
9	A	Philipp Kronsteiner	Austria	15.98	x	x	15.98	q
10	B	Quentin Mouyabi	France	x	x	15.93	15.93	q
11	A	Alexandru Gheorghe Tache	Romania	15.66	15.92	15.80	15.92	q, SB
12	B	Jaime Guerra	Spain	15.58	15.70	15.90w	15.90w	q
13	B	Oleksandr Malosilov	Ukraine	15.28	15.88	15.54	15.88	
14	B	Al Assane Fofana	France	15.72	15.64	15.80	15.80	
15	B	Gustaf Bålström	Sweden	15.68	x	15.80	15.80	PB
16	B	Dimitrios Monopolis	Greece	14.29	15.46	15.77	15.77	
17	B	Mert Çiçek	Turkey	x	15.74	x	15.74	
18	A	Nikolaos Andrikopoulos	Greece	15.63	x	x	15.63	
19	B	Sedin Heco	Bosnia and Herzegovina	15.37	15.52	x	15.52	
20	A	Aramayis Sargsyan	Armenia	15.11	15.44	15.48	15.48	SB
21	B	Simone Biasutti	Italy	15.20	15.36	x	15.36	
22	A	Oleksandr Popko	Ukraine	13.77	14.61	15.31	15.31	
23	A	Paul Walschburger	Germany	15.21w	14.86	15.25	15.25	
24	B	Carlos Kouassi	Switzerland	15.20	x	14.93	15.20	
25	B	Ade Mason	Great Britain	15.15	14.11	x	15.15	

=== Final ===
Rank	Name	Nationality	#1	#2	#3	#4	#5	#6	Result	Notes
1st place, gold medalist(s)	Necati Er	Turkey	16.73	17.37	–	x	x	x	17.37	NR
2nd place, silver medalist(s)	Nazim Babayev	Azerbaijan	16.55	x	17.03w	x	16.98	x	17.03w	
3rd place, bronze medalist(s)	Andrea Dallavalle	Italy	16.60	16.95	13.57w	–	16.03	16.19	16.95	PB
4	Tobia Bocchi	Italy	16.17	x	x	x	x	16.59	16.59	
5	Răzvan Cristian Grecu	Romania	15.82	16.10	16.22	16.45	16.36	15.90	16.45	PB
6	Enzo Hodebar	France	16.11	15.98	16.22	16.32	16.08	16.17	16.32	
7	Jaime Guerra	Spain	15.70	16.30	15.84w	x	15.35	15.79	16.30	PB
8	Florin Alexandru Vișan	Romania	x	x	16.15	x	x	x	16.15	
9	Ondřej Vodák	Czech Republic	13.28w	15.48w	15.86				15.86	
10	Alexandru Gheorghe Tache	Romania	14.47	15.86	x				15.86	
11	Quentin Mouyabi	France	x	x	15.82w				15.82w	
12	Philipp Kronsteiner	Austria	x	x	15.26				15.26	
