= 2023 European Athletics Indoor Championships – Men's triple jump =

Men's high jump at the 2023 European Athletics Indoor Championships
- Venue: Ataköy Athletics Arena
- Location: Istanbul, Turkey
- Dates: 2 March 2023 (qualification); 3 March 2023 (final)
- Competitors: 17 from 12 nations
- Winning mark: 17.60 m WL, =NR

Medalists
gold medal	Pedro Pichardo	Portugal
silver medal	Nikolaos Andrikopoulos	Greece
bronze medal	Max Heß	Germany

The men's triple jump event at the 2023 European Athletics Indoor Championships was held on 2 March at 19:53 (qualification) and 3 March at 20:35 (final) local time.

== Records ==
Standing records prior to the 2023 European Athletics Indoor Championships
World record	Hugues Fabrice Zango (BUR)	18.07	Aubière, France	16 January 2021
European record	Teddy Tamgho (FRA)	17.92	Paris, France	6 March 2011
Championship record	Teddy Tamgho (FRA)	17.92	Paris, France	6 March 2011
World Leading	Jordan Díaz (ESP)	17.59	Madrid, Spain	19 February 2023
European Leading	Jordan Díaz (ESP)	17.59	Madrid, Spain	19 February 2023

== Results ==
=== Qualification ===
Qualification: Qualifying performance 16.70 (Q) or at least 8 best performers (q) advance to the Final.

Rank	Athlete	Nationality	#1	#2	#3	Result	Note
1	Pedro Pichardo	Portugal	17.48			17.48	Q, NR
2	Max Heß	Germany	16.67	16.40	–	16.67	q
3	Tobia Bocchi	Italy	16.29	16.47	–	16.47	q
4	Nazim Babayev	Azerbaijan	16.45	16.29	–	16.45	q, SB
5	Tiago Pereira	Portugal	15.06	16.15	16.39	16.39	q
6	Nikolaos Andrikopoulos	Greece	15.81	16.05	16.39	16.39	q, SB
7	Benjamin Compaoré	France	x	16.37	16.00	16.37	q after revised result
8	Dimitrios Tsiamis	Greece	16.22	x	16.26	16.26	q
9	Batuhan Çakir	Turkey	x	16.06	16.20	16.20	q, SB
10	Simone Biasutti	Italy	15.91	15.84	16.20	16.20	
11	Enzo Hodebar	France	x	x	16.09	16.09	SB
12	Andreas Pantazis	Greece	x	x	16.06	16.06	
13	Jesper Hellström	Sweden	x	15.40	15.95	15.95	
14	Georgi Nachev	Bulgaria	x	15.81	15.92	15.92	
15	Levon Aghasyan	Armenia	15.19	15.78	15.89	15.89	SB
16	Jan Luxa	Slovenia	15.70	15.50	15.68	15.70	SB
	Răzvan Cristian Grecu	Romania	x	r		NM	

=== Final ===
Rank	Athlete	Nationality	#1	#2	#3	#4	#5	#6	Result	Note
1st place, gold medalist(s)	Pedro Pichardo	Portugal	17.26	–	17.60	–	–	x	17.60	WL NR
2nd place, silver medalist(s)	Nikolaos Andrikopoulos	Greece	16.20	x	x	15.91	16.58	x	16.58	SB
3rd place, bronze medalist(s)	Max Heß	Germany	16.96	x	x	16.54	15.91	16.57	16.57	
4	Tiago Pereira	Portugal	16.29	16.10	x	16.32	16.51	16.34	16.51	SB
5	Nazim Babayev	Azerbaijan	x	16.50	x	x	16.46	x	16.50	SB
6	Tobia Bocchi	Italy	15.11	16.29	16.39	x	16.35	14.33	16.39	
7	Dimitrios Tsiamis	Greece	16.07	x	x	14.07	16.39	x	16.39	
8	Benjamin Compaoré	France	15.79	16.11	x	–	15.22	x	16.11	
9	Batuhan Çakir	Turkey	15.70	16.02	x				16.02	
