= 2014 European Athletics Championships – Men's triple jump =

Men's triple jump at the European Athletics Championships

The men's triple jump at the 2014 European Athletics Championships took place at the Letzigrund on 12 and 14 August.

== Medalists ==
Gold	Benjamin Compaoré; France
Silver	Lyukman Adams; Russia
Bronze	Aleksey Fyodorov; Russia

== Records ==
Standing records prior to the 2014 European Athletics Championships
World record	Jonathan Edwards (GBR)	18.29 m	Gothenburg, Sweden	7 August 1995
European record	Jonathan Edwards (GBR)	18.29	Gothenburg, Sweden	7 August 1995
Championship record	Jonathan Edwards (GBR)	17.99	Budapest, Hungary	23 August 1998
World Leading	Pedro Pablo Pichardo (CUB)	17.76	Havana, Cuba	17 February 2014
European Leading	Lyukman Adams (RUS)	17.29	Eugene, United States	31 May 2014
Broken records during the 2014 European Athletics Championships
European Leading	Benjamin Compaoré (FRA)	17.46	Zürich, Switzerland	14 August 2014

== Schedule ==
Date	Time	Round
12 August 2014	13:12	Qualification
14 August 2014	20:10	Final

All times are local times (UTC+2)

== Results ==
=== Qualification ===
Qualification: Qualification Performance 16.65 (Q) or at least 12 best performers advance to the final

Rank	Group	Name	Nationality	#1	#2	#3	Result	Notes
1	B	Lyukman Adams	Russia	16.27	16.52	16.97	16.97	Q
2	B	Benjamin Compaoré	France	16.20	x	16.83	16.83	Q
3	B	Nelson Évora	Portugal	16.64	16.82		16.82	Q
4	A	Yoann Rapinier	France	16.36	16.23	16.80	16.80	Q
5	B	Pablo Torrijos	Spain	16.38	16.66		16.66	Q
6	A	Aleksey Fyodorov	Russia	16.11	16.19	16.65	16.65	Q
7	A	Fabrizio Donato	Italy	x	16.64	–	16.64	q
8	B	Rumen Dimitrov	Bulgaria	16.27	16.62	r	16.62	q
9	A	Marian Oprea	Romania	16.57	–	–	16.57	q
10	B	Dzmitry Platnitski	Belarus	x	16.01	16.54	16.54	q
11	A	Dimitrios Tsiamis	Greece	16.05	16.53	x	16.53	q
12	B	Fabrizio Schembri	Italy	16.52	16.31	16.47	16.52	q
13	A	Julian Reid	Great Britain	16.52	16.13	16.32	16.52	
14	A	Georgi Tsonov	Bulgaria	15.74	x	16.35	16.35	PB
15	B	Zlatozar Atanasov	Bulgaria	15.86	16.30	16.32	16.32	
16	A	Vladimir Letnicov	Moldova	x	16.28	x	16.28	
17	A	Jorge Gimeno	Spain	15.65	x	15.98	15.98	
18	A	Alexander Hochuli	Switzerland	x	x	15.95	15.95	
19	B	Viktor Kuznyetsov	Ukraine	15.87	15.94	x	15.94	
20	A	Aliaksei Tsapik	Belarus	15.92	15.84	15.61	15.92	
21	B	Aleksi Tammentie	Finland	x	x	15.83	15.83	
	A	Darius Aučyna	Lithuania				DNS	
	B	Daniele Greco	Italy				DNS	

=== Final ===
Rank	Name	Nationality	#1	#2	#3	#4	#5	#6	Result	Notes
1st place, gold medalist(s)	Benjamin Compaoré	France	17.46	17.18	x	–	x	–	17.46	EL
2nd place, silver medalist(s)	Lyukman Adams	Russia	17.09	16.85	16.74	x	x	17.06	17.09	
3rd place, bronze medalist(s)	Aleksey Fyodorov	Russia	17.04	16.69	x	16.37	16.70	16.76	17.04	
4	Yoann Rapinier	France	x	16.84	16.64	x	16.83	17.01	17.01	
5	Marian Oprea	Romania	16.94	x	x	16.52	–	16.71	16.94	SB
6	Nelson Évora	Portugal	16.63	16.78	16.67	x	16.55	16.67	16.78	
7	Fabrizio Donato	Italy	16.53	16.66	x	x	–	x	16.66	
8	Pablo Torrijos	Spain	16.19	14.46	16.56	x	x	16.56	16.56	
9	Rumen Dimitrov	Bulgaria	16.33	16.15	16.43				16.43	
10	Dimitrios Tsiamis	Greece	16.23	16.39	16.07				16.39	
11	Dzmitry Platnitski	Belarus	x	16.09	16.25				16.25	
12	Fabrizio Schembri	Italy	15.10	16.02	x				16.02	
