= 2021 World Athletics U20 Championships – Men's triple jump =

Event at the 2021 World Athletics

Men's triple jump at the 2021 World Athletics U20 Championships
- Venue: Kasarani Stadium
- Dates: 22 August
- Competitors: 10 from 9 nations
- Winning distance: 16.43 m

Medalists
gold medal	Gabriel Wallmark	Sweden
silver medal	Jaydon Hibbert	Jamaica
bronze medal	Simon Gore	France

The men's triple jump at the 2021 World Athletics U20 Championships was held at the Kasarani Stadium on 22 August.

== Records ==
Standing records prior to the 2021 World Athletics U20 Championships
World U20 Record	Volker Mai (GDR)	17.50	Erfurt, East Germany	23 June 1985
Championship Record	Jordan Díaz (CUB)	17.15	Tampere, Finland	14 July 2018
World U20 Leading	Sean Dixon-Bodie (USA)	16.61	Eugene, United States	11 June 2021

== Results ==
=== Final ===
The final was held on 22 August at 14:30.

Rank	Name	Nationality	Round						Mark	Notes
Rank	Name	Nationality	1	2	3	4	5	6	Mark	Notes
1st place, gold medalist(s)	Gabriel Wallmark	Sweden	15.91	x	16.29	16.43	–	16.05	16.43	NU20R
2nd place, silver medalist(s)	Jaydon Hibbert	Jamaica	15.68	16.05	–	x	14.74	x	16.05	PB
3rd place, bronze medalist(s)	Simon Gore	France	15.55	15.85	x	x	x	15.33	15.85	PB
4	Donald Makimairaj	India	15.14	15.70	x	15.39	15.82	x	15.82	PB
5	Endiorass Kingley	Austria	14.34 w	14.99	15.63	15.63	15.75	15.17	15.75	
6	Grigoris Nikolaou	Cyprus	15.34	15.18	x	15.20	15.74	x	15.74	PB
7	N'Zebou Attoungbre	Ivory Coast	14.94	15.71	15.36	x	15.10	15.26	15.71	PB
8	Felipe Izidoro	Brazil	15.69	x	15.54	x	15.38	15.57	15.69	
9	Graig Briquet	France	x	15.28	x				15.28	
10	Justine Kipkosgei Maiyo	Kenya	x	14.95	15.13				15.13	
	Dimitar Tashev	Bulgaria							DNS	
