= Greece at the 2018 European Championships =

- IOC code: GRE

in (United Kingdom) Glasgow (Germany) Berlin 2 August 2018 – 12 August 2018
- Competitors: 93 in 5 sports
- Medals Ranked 14th: Gold 4 Silver 3 Bronze 2 Total 9

European Championships appearances
- 2018; 2022

Greece competed at the inaugural 7 sports 2018 European Championships from 2 to 12 August 2018. It competed in 5 sports.

== Medallists ==
Medal	Name	Sport	Event	Date
Gold	Miltiadis Tentoglou	Athletics	Men's long jump	8 August
Gold	Ekaterini Stefanidi	Athletics	Women's pole vault	9 August
Gold	Paraskevi Papahristou	Athletics	Women's triple jump	10 August
Gold	Eleftherios Petrounias	Gymnastics	Men's rings	12 August
Silver	Kristian Gkolomeev	Swimming	Men's 50 metre freestyle	9 August
Silver	Nikoleta Kiriakopoulou	Athletics	Women's pole vault	9 August
Silver	Maria Belibasaki	Athletics	Women's 400 metres	11 August
Bronze	Apostolos Christou	Swimming	Men's 100 metre backstroke	6 August
Bronze	Dimitrios Tsiamis	Athletics	Men's triple jump	12 August
