= 2023 European Athletics U23 Championships – Men's triple jump =

Men's triple jump at the 2023 European Athletics U23 Championships
- Venue: Leppävaara Stadium
- Location: Espoo, Finland
- Dates: 14 July (qualification); 15 July (final)
- Competitors: 19 from 16 nations
- Winning distance: 16.40 m

Medalists
gold medal	Simon Gore	France
silver medal	Gabriel Wallmark	Sweden
bronze medal	Batuhan Çakır	Turkey

The men's triple jump event at the 2023 European Athletics U23 Championships was held in Espoo, Finland, at Leppävaara Stadium on 14 and 15 July.

== Records ==
Prior to the competition, the records were as follows:

European U23 record	Teddy Tamgho (FRA)	17.98 m	New York City, United States	12 June 2010
Championship U23 record	Şeref Osmanoğlu (UKR)	17.72 m	Ostrava, Czech Republic	17 July 2011

== Results ==
=== Qualification ===
Qualification rules: All athletes over 15.90 m (Q) or at least 12 best (q) advanced to the final.

Rank	Group	Name	Nationality	#1	#2	#3	Mark	Notes
1	B	Simon Gore	France	16.03			16.03	Q
2	A	Batuhan Çakir	Turkey	x	15.96	–	15.96	Q
3	A	Gabriel Wallmark	Sweden	15.67	15.90	–	15.90	Q, SB
4	A	Henrik Flåtnes	Norway	x	15.90	–	15.90	Q
5	B	Enrico Montanari	Italy	15.46	x	15.58	15.58	q
6	A	Pablo Delgado	Spain	15.39	15.07	15.58	15.58	q
7	B	Filipe Barreto Silva	Portugal	15.43	15.31	15.51	15.51	q
8	B	Endiorass Kingley	Austria	15.32	15.17	15.44	15.44	q
9	A	Dimitâr Tashev	Bulgaria	x	15.38	15.17	15.38	q
10	B	Mesut Bülbül	Turkey	14.88	15.32	15.33	15.33	q
11	A	Gabriele Tosti	Italy	x	15.33	13.22	15.33	q
12	B	Sandis Dzenītis	Latvia	15.32	15.17	14.69	15.32	q
13	B	Archie Yeo	Great Britain	x	15.31	x	15.31	
14	A	Grigoris Nikolaou	Cyprus	14.97	x	15.12	15.12	
15	B	Federico Bruno	Italy	x	x	15.09	15.09	
16	B	Aapo Karvinen	Finland	x	14.30	14.97	14.97	
17	A	Zsombor Iván	Hungary	14.52	14.41	14.68	14.68	
18	B	Jakub Kunt	Czech Republic	14.19	x	x	14.19	
	A	Vladyslav Shepeliev	Ukraine					DNS

=== Final ===
Place	Athlete	Nation	#1	#2	#3	#4	#5	#6	Result	Notes
1st place, gold medalist(s)	Simon Gore	France	16.18 m (+1.3 m/s)	16.38 m (+0.7 m/s)	16.19 m (+0.5 m/s)	16.40 m (+0.9 m/s)	x	15.08 m (−0.1 m/s)	16.40 m (+0.9 m/s)	SB
2nd place, silver medalist(s)	Gabriel Wallmark	Sweden	15.94 m (+2.7 m/s)	x	16.24 m (+0.4 m/s)	15.92 m (+1.0 m/s)	-	15.88 m (+0.5 m/s)	16.24 m (+0.4 m/s)	SB
3rd place, bronze medalist(s)	Batuhan Çakır	Turkey	15.61 m (+0.5 m/s)	14.57 m (+1.0 m/s)	15.88 m (+1.2 m/s)	14.85 m (+1.9 m/s)	16.16 m (+1.7 m/s)	15.69 m (+0.9 m/s)	16.16 m (+1.7 m/s)	
4	Endiorass Kingley	Austria	15.87 m (+1.5 m/s)	x	16.05 m (−0.1 m/s)	16.06 m (+0.5 m/s)	x	15.94 m (+0.6 m/s)	16.06 m (+0.5 m/s)	SB
5	Sandis DzenÄ«tis	Latvia	15.01 m (+2.1 m/s)	15.12 m (+0.3 m/s)	15.69 m (+1.0 m/s)	15.02 m (+2.1 m/s)	15.45 m (+0.8 m/s)	16.00 m (+0.8 m/s)	16.00 m (+0.8 m/s)	SB
6	Henrik Flåtnes	Norway	15.41 m (+0.9 m/s)	15.58 m (+1.3 m/s)	15.82 m (+1.1 m/s)	x	15.33 m (+0.7 m/s)	15.97 m (+0.3 m/s)	15.97 m (+0.3 m/s)	
7	Enrico Montanari	Italy	15.87 m (+2.0 m/s)	-	-	-	r		15.87 m (+2.0 m/s)	
8	Dimitar Tashev	Bulgaria	x	x	15.73 m (+0.4 m/s)	15.45 m (+1.6 m/s)	x	x	15.73 m (+0.4 m/s)	
9	Filipe Barreto Silva	Portugal	15.42 m (+1.6 m/s)	14.99 m (−1.0 m/s)	15.55 m (+1.5 m/s)				15.55 m (+1.5 m/s)	
10	Mesut BülbüL	Turkey	14.65 m (+1.5 m/s)	15.39 m (−0.4 m/s)	15.05 m (+1.0 m/s)				15.39 m (−0.4 m/s)	
11	Gabriele Tosti	Italy	15.36 m (+1.3 m/s)	15.31 m (+0.2 m/s)	x				15.36 m (+1.3 m/s)	
12	Pablo Delgado	Spain	13.04 m (+1.8 m/s)	x	15.26 m (+0.9 m/s)				15.26 m (+0.9 m/s)	
