= 2021 European Athletics Indoor Championships – Men's triple jump =

The men's triple jump event at the 2021 European Athletics Indoor Championships was held on 5 March at 10:11 (qualification) and 7 March at 10:53 (final) local time.

== Medalists ==
Gold	Silver	Bronze
Pedro Pichardo; Portugal	Alexis Copello; Azerbaijan	Max Heß; Germany

== Records ==
Standing records prior to the 2021 European Athletics Indoor Championships
World record	Hugues Fabrice Zango (BUR)	18.07	Aubière, France	16 January 2021
European record	Teddy Tamgho (FRA)	17.92	Paris, France	6 March 2011
Championship record	Teddy Tamgho (FRA)	17.92	Paris, France	6 March 2011
World Leading	Hugues Fabrice Zango (BUR)	18.07	Aubière, France	16 January 2021
European Leading	Pedro Pichardo (POR)	17.36	Braga, Portugal	13 February 2021

== Results ==
=== Qualification ===
Qualification: Qualifying performance 16.80 (Q) or at least 8 best performers (q) advance to the Final.

Rank	Athlete	Nationality	#1	#2	#3	Result	Note
1	Pedro Pichardo	Portugal	17.03			17.03	Q
2	Max Heß	Germany	16.86			16.86	Q
3	Alexis Copello	Azerbaijan	16.84			16.84	Q, =SB
4	Adrian Świderski	Poland	16.27	x	16.45	16.45	q
5	Tobia Bocchi	Italy	16.40	16.38	14.94	16.40	q
6	Dimitrios Tsiamis	Greece	16.10	16.02	16.38	16.38	q
7	Levon Aghasyan	Armenia	15.11	16.36	16.24	16.36	q
8	Jesper Hellström	Sweden	x	16.05	16.28	16.28	q
9	Maksim Niastsiarenka	Belarus	16.19	16.24	x	16.24	
10	Necati Er	Turkey	15.50	15.79	16.17	16.17	
11	Georgi Tsonov	Bulgaria	15.46	15.53	16.16	16.16	
12	Jan Luxa	Slovenia	x	15.66	15.78	15.78	
13	Nikolaos Andrikopoulos	Greece	15.61	15.24	x	15.61	
14	Melvin Raffin	France	15.11	x	15.29	15.29	

=== Final ===
Rank	Athlete	Nationality	#1	#2	#3	#4	#5	#6	Result	Note
1st place, gold medalist(s)	Pedro Pichardo	Portugal	17.30	17.09	x	17.06	–	17.12	17.30	
2nd place, silver medalist(s)	Alexis Copello	Azerbaijan	16.68	16.98	x	x	x	17.04	17.04	SB
3rd place, bronze medalist(s)	Max Heß	Germany	16.96	x	x	x	x	17.01	17.01	SB
4	Tobia Bocchi	Italy	16.45	16.65	x	15.82	x	16.06	16.65	
5	Levon Aghasyan	Armenia	15.54	16.55	x	16.43	16.47	16.52	16.55	SB
6	Jesper Hellström	Sweden	16.45	x	x	16.43	x	x	16.45	
7	Dimitrios Tsiamis	Greece	16.13	16.40	16.35	16.35	x	x	16.40	
8	Adrian Świderski	Poland	16.27	16.27	16.36	x	x	x	16.36	
