= Max Heß =

German triple jumper (born 1996)

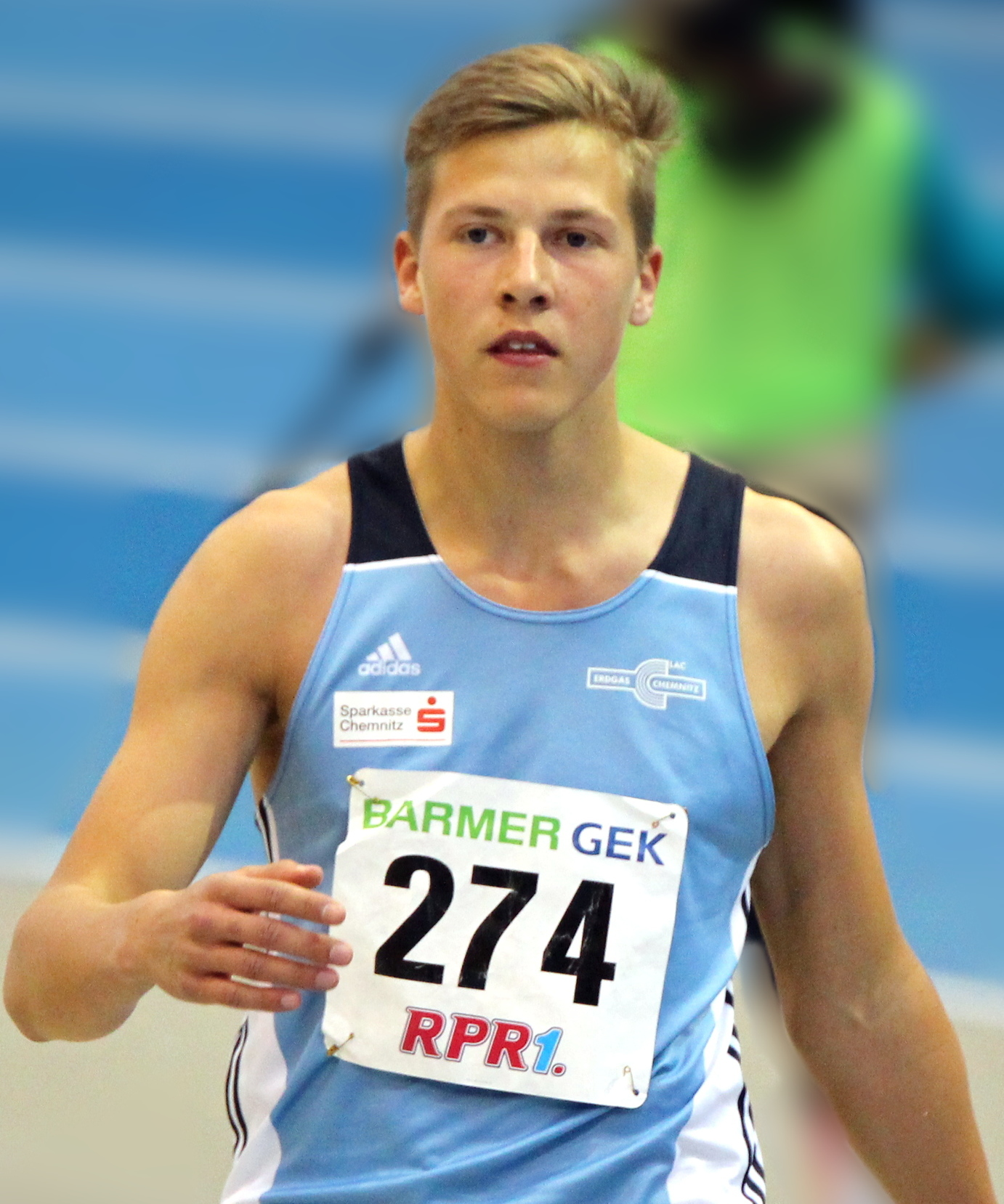
- Heß in 2015

Personal information
- Born: 13 July 1996 (age 29) Chemnitz, Germany
- Height: 1.86 m (6 ft 1 in)
- Weight: 80 kg (176 lb)

Sport
- Country: Germany
- Sport: Track and field
- Event: Triple jump
- Club: LAC Erdgas Chemnitz
- Coached by: Harry Marusch

Achievements and titles
- Personal bests: Outdoor: 17.20 m (2016); Indoor: NR 17.52 m (2017)
Medal record
Men's athletics
Representing Germany
World Indoor Championships
Silver medal – second place	2016 Portland	Triple jump
European Championships
Gold medal – first place	2016 Amsterdam	Triple jump
European Indoor Championships
Silver medal – second place	2025 Apeldoorn	Triple jump
Bronze medal – third place	2017 Belgrade	Triple jump
Bronze medal – third place	2019 Glasgow	Triple jump
Bronze medal – third place	2021 Toruń	Triple jump
Bronze medal – third place	2023 Istanbul	Triple jump
European U23 Championships
Bronze medal – third place	2017 Bydgoszcz	Triple jump
World Junior Championships
Silver medal – second place	2014 Eugene	Triple jump

Max Heß (born 13 July 1996) is a German track and field athlete who competes in the triple jump. He competed at the 2016 Summer Olympics and is the 2016 European Champion.

== Career ==
Born in 1996, Heß won a silver medal at the 2014 World Junior Championships. He won another silver medal at the 2016 World Indoor Championships. He won gold at the 2016 European Championships. In 2017, he competed in the European Indoor Championships and the European U23 Championships, winning bronze in both. At the former, he set a personal best and German record of 17.52 m.

== Competition record ==
Year	Competition	Venue	Position	Event	Notes
Representing Germany
2013	World Youth Championships	Donetsk, Ukraine	8th	Triple jump	15.52 m
2014	World Junior Championships	Eugene, United States	2nd	Triple jump	16.55 m
2015	European Indoor Championships	Prague, Czech Republic	11th (q)	Long jump	7.71 m
2016	World Indoor Championships	Portland, United States	2nd	Triple jump	17.14 m
2016	European Championships	Amsterdam, Netherlands	1st	Triple jump	17.20 m
2016	Olympic Games	Rio de Janeiro, Brazil	15th (q)	Triple jump	16.56 m
2017	European Indoor Championships	Belgrade, Serbia	3rd	Triple jump	17.12 m
2017	European U23 Championships	Bydgoszcz, Poland	3rd	Triple jump	16.68 m
2018	World Indoor Championships	Birmingham, United Kingdom	11th	Triple jump	16.47 m
2018	European Championships	Berlin, Germany	15th (q)	Triple jump	16.32 m
2019	European Indoor Championships	Glasgow, United Kingdom	3rd	Triple jump	17.10 m
2021	European Indoor Championships	Toruń, Poland	3rd	Triple jump	17.01 m
2021	Olympic Games	Tokyo, Japan	17th (q)	Triple jump	16.69 m
2022	World Championships	Eugene, United States	13th (q)	Triple jump	16.64 m
2023	European Indoor Championships	Istanbul, Turkey	3rd	Triple jump	16.57 m
2023	World Championships	Budapest, Hungary	18th (q)	Triple jump	16.48 m
2024	World Indoor Championships	Glasgow, United Kingdom	9th	Triple jump	16.66 m
2024	European Championships	Rome, Italy	5th	Triple jump	17.04 m
2024	Olympic Games	Paris, France	7th	Triple jump	17.38 m
2025	European Indoor Championships	Apeldoorn, Netherlands	2nd	Triple jump	17.43 m
2025	World Indoor Championships	Nanjing, China	6th	Triple jump	17.03 m
2025	World Championships	Tokyo, Japan	29th (q)	Triple jump	16.09 m

== Personal bests ==
Outdoor

- Long jump – 7.57 (+0.5 m/s, Weinheim 2015)
- Triple jump – 17.20 (Amsterdam 2016)

Indoor

- Long jump – 8.03 (Chemnitz 2015)
- Triple jump – 17.52 NR (Belgrade 2017)
