= Kevin Luron =

French triple jumper

Kevin Luron (born 8 November 1991 in Le Mans) is a French triple jumper.

He won the silver medal at the 2017 Jeux de la Francophonie. He also competed at the 2010 World Junior Championships and the 2017 European Indoor Championships without reaching the final.

His personal best jump is 16.85 metres, achieved in July 2017 in Marseille.
