= Vladyslav Shepeliev =

Ukrainian triple jumper (born 2001)

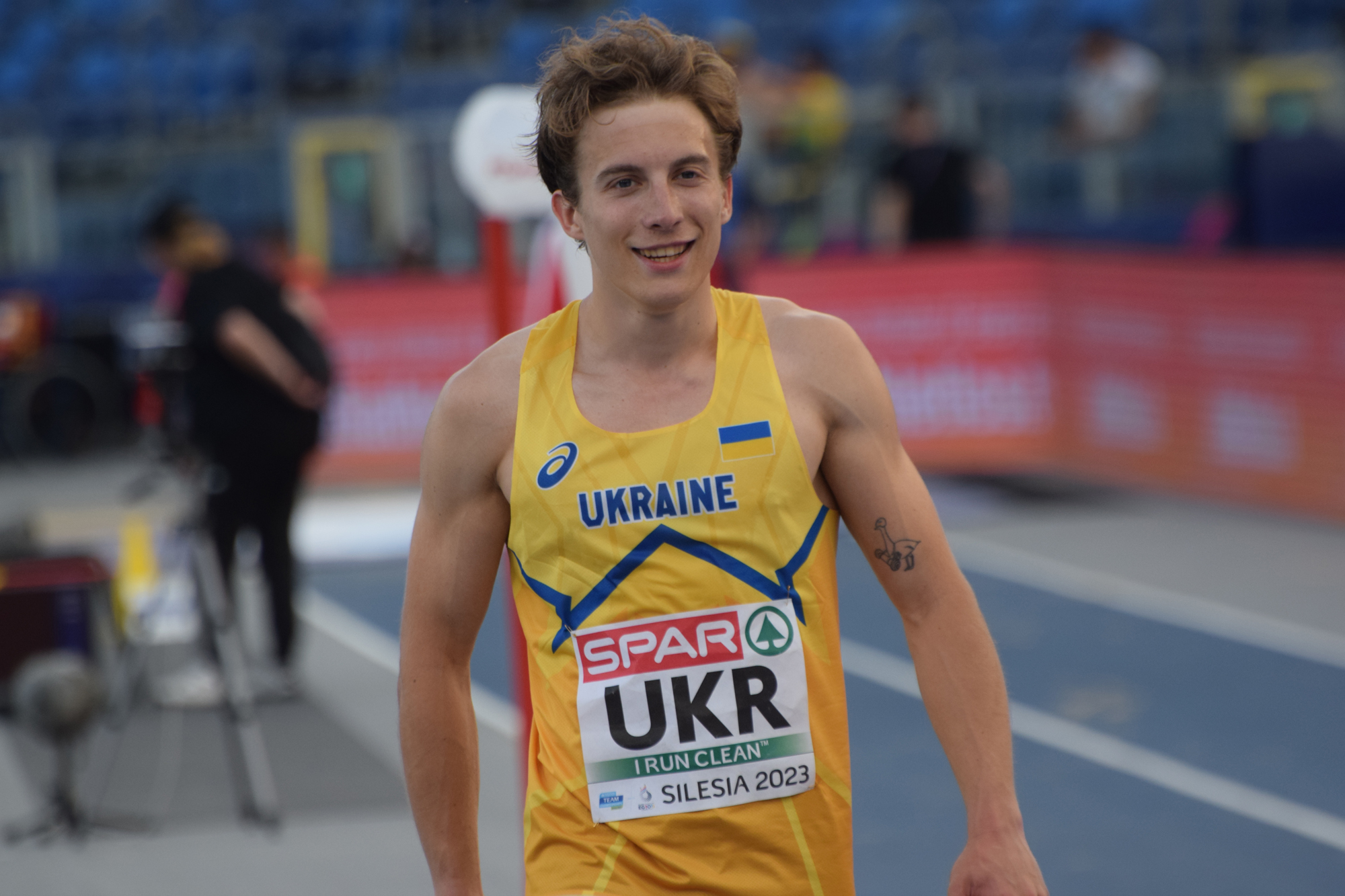
- Vladyslav Shepeliev at the 2023 European Games

Personal information
- Born: 12 September 2001 (age 24) Chornomorsk, Odesa Oblast, Ukraine
- Height: 1.77 m (5 ft 10 in)
- Weight: 69 kg (152 lb)

Sport
- Sport: Athletics
- Event: Triple jump
- Coached by: Serhiy Polinkov
Medal record
Men's athletics
Representing Ukraine
European Games
Bronze medal – third place	2023 Kraków–Małopolska	Triple jump

Vladyslav Shepeliev (Ukrainian: Владислав Шепелєв; born 12 September 2001) is a Ukrainian athlete specialising in the triple jump.

== Career ==
Shepeliev finished 3rd at the 2023 European Games which became his first international success. He did not manage to qualify for the 2024 Summer Olympics.

== International competitions ==
Year	Competition	Venue	Position	Event	Notes
Representing Ukraine
2021	European U23 Championships	Tallinn, Estonia	16th	Triple jump	15.44 m
2023	European U23 Championships	Espoo, Finland	DNS	Triple jump	DNS
2023	European Games	Chorzów, Poland	3rd	Triple jump	16.67 m
2024	European Championships	Rome, Italy	17th	Triple jump	16.17 m
2025	European Indoor Championships	Apeldoorn, Netherlands	10th	Triple jump	15.94 m
2025	European Team Championships	Madrid, Spain	3rd	Triple jump	16.83 m
2025	World University Games	Bochum, Germany	5th	Triple jump	16.21 m (w)

== Personal life ==
Shepeliev graduated from the National University of Ukraine on Physical Education and Sport.

== Links ==
Vladyslav Shepeliev on Instagram
