= 2025 World Athletics Indoor Championships – Men's triple jump =

Men's triple jump at the 2025 World Athletics Indoor Championships
- Venue: Nanjing's Cube at Nanjing Youth Olympic Sports Park
- Location: Nanjing, China
- Dates: 21 March
- Competitors: 15 from 11 nations
- Winning distance: 17.80 m

Medalists
gold medal	Andy Díaz	Italy
silver medal	Zhu Yaming	China
bronze medal	Hugues Fabrice Zango	Burkina Faso

The men's triple jump at the 2025 World Athletics Indoor Championships took place on the short track of the Nanjing's Cube at Nanjing Youth Olympic Sports Park in Nanjing, China, on 21 March 2025. This was the 21st time the event was contested at the World Athletics Indoor Championships. Athletes could qualify by achieving the entry standard or by their World Athletics Ranking in the event.

The final took place on 21 March during the evening session.

== Background ==
The men's triple jump was contested 20 times before 2025, at every previous edition of the World Athletics Indoor Championships.

Records before the 2025 World Athletics Indoor Championships
Record	Athlete (nation)	Distance (m)	Location	Date
World record	Jonathan Edwards (GBR)	18.29	Gothenburg, Sweden	7 August 1995
Championship record	Teddy Tamgho (FRA)	17.90	Doha, Qatar	14 March 2010
World leading	Andy Díaz (ITA)	17.71	Apeldoorn, Netherlands	8 March 2025

== Qualification ==
For the men's triple jump, the qualification period ran from 1 September 2024 until 9 March 2025. Athletes could qualify by achieving the entry standards of 17.40 m. Athletes could also qualify by virtue of their World Athletics Ranking for the event or by virtue of their World Athletics Indoor Tour wildcard. There was a target number of 16 athletes.

== Final ==
The final was held on 21 March, starting at 11:05 (UTC+8) in the morning.

Place	Athlete	Nation	Round						Result	Notes
Place	Athlete	Nation	#1	#2	#3	#4	#5	#6	Result	Notes
1st place, gold medalist(s)	Andy Díaz	Italy	17.80	x	–	–	–	x	17.80 m	WL, NR
2nd place, silver medalist(s)	Zhu Yaming	China	16.90	17.08	17.33	x	17.27	17.09	17.33 m	SB
3rd place, bronze medalist(s)	Hugues Fabrice Zango	Burkina Faso	16.88	17.01	x	16.93	17.15	x	17.15 m	SB
4	Jordan Scott	Jamaica	x	16.55	16.25	17.10	17.04	16.86	17.10 m	
5	Su Wen	China	17.09	x	17.04	16.96	16.89	x	17.09 m	SB
6	Max Heß	Germany	16.91	15.62	x	14.00	17.03		17.03 m	
7	Chengetayi Mapaya	Zimbabwe	16.74	x	–	16.33	–		16.74 m	
8	Russell Robinson	United States	16.50	x	x	16.21			16.50 m	
9	Simone Biasutti	Italy	x	16.17	16.37	x			16.37 m	
10	Will Claye	United States	x	16.26	16.31				16.31 m	
11	Elton Petronilho	Brazil	x	16.28	16.15				16.28 m	
12	Marcos Ruiz	Spain	x	x	16.20				16.20 m	
13	Lázaro Martínez	Cuba	x	x	14.04				14.04 m	
—	Melvin Raffin	France	x	x	x				NM	
—	Almir dos Santos	Brazil	17.04	17.09	17.22	x	16.95	16.75	DQ	TR7.1[TR5.2] [S1]

• Almir dos Santos won the bronze medal, but later was disqualified for wearing non-regulation shoes.
