= 2015 European Athletics Indoor Championships – Men's triple jump =

The men's triple jump event at the 2015 European Athletics Indoor Championships was held on 6 March 2015 at 10:00 (qualification) and 7 March, 18:40 (final) local time.

== Medalists ==
Gold	Silver	Bronze
Nelson Évora; Portugal	Pablo Torrijos; Spain	Marian Oprea; Romania

== Records ==
Standing records prior to the 2015 European Athletics Indoor Championships
World record	Teddy Tamgho (FRA)	17.92	Paris, France	6 March 2011
European record	Teddy Tamgho (FRA)	17.92	Paris, France	6 March 2011
Championship record	Teddy Tamgho (FRA)	17.92	Paris, France	6 March 2011
World Leading	Marquis Dendy (USA)	17.23	Fayetteville, United States	14 February 2015
European Leading	Nelson Évora (POR)	17.19	Pombal, Portugal	22 February 2015

== Results ==
=== Qualification ===
Qualification: Qualification Performance 16.75 (Q) or at least 8 best performers advanced to the final.

Rank	Athlete	Nationality	#1	#2	#3	Result	Note
1	Dmitriy Sorokin	Russia	16.76			16.76	Q
2	Marian Oprea	Romania	16.63	x	–	16.63	q, SB
3	Nelson Évora	Portugal	16.51	16.61	15.95	16.61	q
4	Georgi Tsonov	Bulgaria	16.51	16.10	16.09	16.61	q, PB
5	Aleksey Fyodorov	Russia	16.53	14.46	x	16.53	q
6	Pablo Torrijos	Spain	16.50	15.15	16.51	16.51	q
7	Dzmitry Platnitski	Belarus	x	x	16.44	16.44	q
8	Rumen Dimitrov	Bulgaria	16.38	16.28	16.14	16.38	q
9	Jorge Gimeno	Spain	16.24	13.58	16.14	16.24	
10	Vladimir Letnicov	Moldova	x	15.83	16.18	16.18	
11	Sergio Solanas	Spain	15.86	16.17	14.85	16.17	
12	Adrian Świderski	Poland	15.65	x	16.12	16.12	
13	Fabrizio Schembri	Italy	16.08	x	16.02	16.08	
14	Zlatozar Atanasov	Bulgaria	x	16.05	x	16.05	
15	Lasha Torgvaidze	Georgia	15.97	15.81	x	15.97	
16	Levon Aghasyan	Armenia	x	15.84	15.94	15.94	
17	Nazim Babayev	Azerbaijan	x	x	15.92	15.92	
18	Alexandru George Baciu	Romania	x	14.95	15.79	15.79	
19	Maksim Nesterenka	Belarus	x	x	15.15	15.15	
20	Dmitriy Chizhikov	Russia	14.61	13.65	13.35	14.61	
21	Martin Koch	Slovakia	x	x	14.26	14.26	

=== Final ===
Rank	Athlete	Nationality	#1	#2	#3	#4	#5	#6	Result	Note
1st place, gold medalist(s)	Nelson Évora	Portugal	x	x	16.98	16.97	17.15	17.21	17.21	SB
2nd place, silver medalist(s)	Pablo Torrijos	Spain	16.33	16.93	16.15	16.79	17.04	16.34	17.04	NR
3rd place, bronze medalist(s)	Marian Oprea	Romania	16.74	16.91	x	16.80	–	16.73	16.91	SB
4	Aleksey Fyodorov	Russia	x	x	16.88	16.66	16.68	16.87	16.88	
5	Georgi Tsonov	Bulgaria	16.51	x	x	16.48	16.75	16.67	16.75	PB
6	Dmitriy Sorokin	Russia	16.65	14.38	16.37	x	16.28	16.53	16.65	
7	Dzmitry Platnitski	Belarus	15.35	16.43	x	x	16.41	16.40	16.43	
8	Rumen Dimitrov	Bulgaria	x	15.91	x	16.36	x	16.12	16.36	
