= 2017 European Athletics Indoor Championships – Men's triple jump =

The men's triple jump event at the 2017 European Athletics Indoor Championships was held on 3 March 2015 at 18:20 (qualification) and 5 March, 16:04 (final) local time.

== Medalists ==
| Gold | Silver | Bronze |
|---|---|---|
| Nelson Évora; Portugal | Fabrizio Donato; Italy | Max Heß; Germany |

== Records ==
Standing records prior to the 2017 European Athletics Indoor Championships
| World record | Teddy Tamgho (FRA) | 17.92 | Paris, France | 6 March 2011 |
| European record | Teddy Tamgho (FRA) | 17.92 | Paris, France | 6 March 2011 |
| Championship record | Teddy Tamgho (FRA) | 17.92 | Paris, France | 6 March 2011 |
| World Leading | Clive Pullen (JAM) | 17.19 | Fayetteville, United States | 11 February 2017 |
| European Leading | Jean-Marc Pontvianne (FRA) | 17.13 | Bordeaux, France | 19 February 2017 |

== Results ==
=== Qualification ===
Qualification: Qualifying performance 16.60 (Q) or at least 8 best performers (q) advance to the Final.

| Rank | Athlete | Nationality | #1 | #2 | #3 | Result | Note |
|---|---|---|---|---|---|---|---|
| 1 | Max Heß | Germany | 17.52 | | | 17.52 | Q, WL |
| 2 | Melvin Raffin | France | 17.20 | | | 17.20 | Q, PB |
| 3 | Jean-Marc Pontvianne | France | 16.93 | | | 16.93 | Q |
| 4 | Elvijs Misāns | Latvia | 16.81 | | | 16.81 | Q, PB |
| 5 | Nelson Évora | Portugal | 16.47 | 16.79 | | 16.79 | Q, SB |
| 6 | Pablo Torrijos | Spain | 16.77 | | | 16.77 | Q, SB |
| 7 | Georgi Tsonov | Bulgaria | x | 15.97 | 16.73 | 16.73 | Q |
| 8 | Fabrizio Donato | Italy | 16.24 | 16.24 | 16.70 | 16.70 | Q |
| 9 | Simo Lipsanen | Finland | 16.69 | | | 16.69 | Q |
| 10 | Kevin Luron | France | x | 16.51 | x | 16.51 | |
| 11 | Daniele Cavazzani | Italy | 16.05 | x | 16.38 | 16.38 | |
| 12 | Rumen Dimitrov | Bulgaria | 16.36 | 16.21 | 16.31 | 16.36 | SB |
| 13 | Tomáš Veszelka | Slovakia | 15.74 | 15.99 | 16.34 | 16.34 | |
| 14 | Julian Kellerer | Austria | 16.14 | x | 16.33 | 16.33 | PB |
| 15 | Adrian Świderski | Poland | x | 16.01 | x | 16.01 | |
| 16 | Pavlo Beznis | Ukraine | x | 15.72 | 15.99 | 15.99 | |
| 17 | Zlatozar Atanasov | Bulgaria | 15.96 | 15.96 | 14.96 | 15.96 | |
| | Levon Aghasyan | Armenia | x | x | x | NM | |

=== Final ===
| Rank | Athlete | Nationality | #1 | #2 | #3 | #4 | #5 | #6 | Result | Note |
|---|---|---|---|---|---|---|---|---|---|---|
| 1st place, gold medalist(s) | Nelson Évora | Portugal | x | 16.92 | 17.20 | x | 16.98 | x | 17.20 | SB |
| 2nd place, silver medalist(s) | Fabrizio Donato | Italy | 15.74 | 17.13 | – | – | – | – | 17.13 | M40 WR |
| 3rd place, bronze medalist(s) | Max Heß | Germany | x | x | 17.12 | x | x | 16.57 | 17.12 | |
| 4 | Elvijs Misāns | Latvia | 17.02 | 15.60 | x | x | 16.98 | 15.79 | 17.02 | PB |
| 5 | Melvin Raffin | France | 16.13 | 16.92 | 16.64 | 15.23 | 16.06 | 16.92 | 16.92 | |
| 6 | Jean-Marc Pontvianne | France | 16.83 | x | 16.90 | 15.45 | x | 16.48 | 16.90 | |
| 7 | Simo Lipsanen | Finland | 16.61 | 16.74 | 16.84 | x | 16.79 | 16.72 | 16.84 | NR |
| 8 | Georgi Tsonov | Bulgaria | 16.57 | x | 16.78 | – | x | – | 16.78 | PB |
| 9 | Pablo Torrijos | Spain | 16.32 | 16.73 | 16.64 | | | | 16.73 | |
