= Athletics at the 2021 Summer World University Games – Men's triple jump =

The men's triple jump event at the 2021 Summer World University Games was held on 1 and 3 August 2023 at the Shuangliu Sports Centre Stadium in Chengdu, China.

== Medalists ==
Gold	Silver	Bronze
Su Wen; China	Necati Er; Turkey	Huang Huafeng; China

== Results ==
=== Qualification ===
Qualification: Qualifying performance 16.50 (Q) or at least 12 best performers (q) advance to the fyinal.

Rank	Group	Name	Nationality	#1	#2	#3	Result	Notes
1	B	Su Wen	China	17.14			17.14	Q
2	A	Necati Er	Turkey	14.30	16.05	16.69	16.69	Q
3	A	Huang Huafeng	China	x	16.49	–	16.49	q, SB
4	B	Conor Murphy	Australia	16.47	–	–	16.47	q
5	B	Răzvan Grecu	Romania	x	16.43	–	16.43	q
6	A	Aiden Hinson	Australia	16.07	x	–	16.07	q
7	B	Ulisses Costa	Brazil	15.56	15.35	15.88	15.88	q
8	A	Andre Anura	Malaysia	14.87	15.50	15.84	15.84	q
9	A	Felipe Izidoro	Brazil	15.74	15.46	13.88	15.74	q
10	B	Adem Boualbani	Algeria	15.06	15.43	15.61	15.61	q
11	A	Yevgeniy Kisselev	Kazakhstan	15.59	x	x	15.59	q
12	A	Hamid Reza Kia	Iran	15.11	15.46	15.55	15.55	q
13	B	Jo Hong-jo	South Korea	15.28	x	15.50	15.50	
14	B	Li Yun-chen	Chinese Taipei	x	x	15.48	15.48	
15	A	Lee Min-je	South Korea	14.79	15.40	15.18	15.40	PB
16	B	Robinson Sekar	India	15.31	x	14.72	15.31	
17	A	Chamal Kumarasiri	Sri Lanka	x	15.30	15.06	15.30	
18	B	Zsombor Iván	Hungary	x	x	15.18	15.18	
19	A	Kayron Johnson	United States	x	14.68	x	14.68	PB
20	B	Viljar Helgestad Gjerde	Norway	x	x	14.36	14.36	
21	B	Waisele Inoke	Fiji	13.32	14.17	14.19	14.19	
–	A	Vaisakh Ajikumar	India	x	x	x	NM	
–	A	Che Long Kin	Macau	x	x	x	NM	

=== Final ===
Rank	Name	Nationality	#1	#2	#3	#4	#5	#6	Result	Notes
1st place, gold medalist(s)	Su Wen	China	16.81	17.01	16.82	16.62	–	17.01	17.01	
2nd place, silver medalist(s)	Necati Er	Turkey	16.83	15.82	x	16.41	–	16.71	16.83	SB
3rd place, bronze medalist(s)	Huang Huafeng	China	16.44	x	16.76	x	16.75	16.15	16.76	SB
4	Conor Murphy	Australia	15.81	16.24	15.93	x	16.40	x	16.40	
5	Adem Boualbani	Algeria	15.72	16.17	x	x	15.72	x	16.17	
6	Răzvan Grecu	Romania	16.08	15.79	15.47	14.79	x	x	16.08	
7	Aiden Hinson	Australia	14.52	15.87	15.84	15.83	16.04	x	16.04	
8	Andre Anura	Malaysia	x	15.83	13.51	15.38	14.76	–	15.83	
9	Felipe Izidoro	Brazil	15.73	x	15.74				15.74	
10	Hamid Reza Kia	Iran	15.03	15.51	x				15.51	
11	Ulisses Costa	Brazil	14.92	x	14.54				14.92	
–	Yevgeniy Kisselev	Kazakhstan	x	x	x				NM	
