= Jorge Gimeno =

Spanish triple jumper

Jorge Gimeno (born 16 February 1990) is a retired Spanish triple jumper.

He finished eleventh at the 2007 World Youth Championships and seventh at the 2010 Ibero-American Championships. He also competed at the 2014 European Championships and the 2015 European Indoor Championships without reaching the final.

His personal best jump is 16.61 metres, achieved in May 2014 in Cartagena. He has 16.67 metres indoors, achieved in February 2015 in Antequera.
