= Dzmitry Platnitski =

Belarusian triple jumper

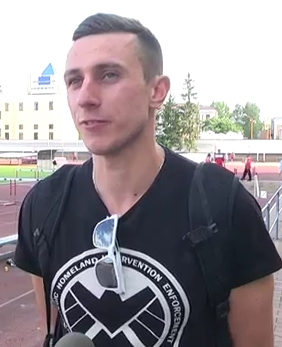
Dzmitry Platnitski in May 2017

Dzmitry Platnitski (Belarusian: Дзьмітры Платніцкі; born 26 August 1988 in Brest) is a Belarusian triple jumper. He competed in the triple jump event at the 2008, 2012 and 2016 Summer Olympics.

== Competition record ==
| Year | Competition | Venue | Position | Event | Notes |
Representing Belarus
| 2006 | World Junior Championships | Beijing, China | 4th | Triple jump | 16.16 m (-0.3 m/s) |
| 2007 | European Junior Championships | Kaunas, Lithuania | 3rd | Triple jump | 16.49 m |
| 2007 | Universiade | Bangkok, Thailand | 5th | Triple jump | 16.50 m |
| 2008 | Olympic Games | Beijing, China | 27th (q) | Triple jump | 16.51 m |
| 2009 | European U23 Championships | Kaunas, Lithuania | 6th | Triple jump | 16.53 m (-0.4 m/s) |
| 2010 | European Championships | Barcelona, Spain | 23rd (q) | Triple jump | 15.95 m |
| 2012 | European Championships | Helsinki, Finland | 7th | Triple jump | 16.68 m |
| 2012 | Olympic Games | London, United Kingdom | 12th | Triple jump | 16.19 m |
| 2014 | European Championships | Zürich, Switzerland | 11th | Triple jump | 16.25 m |
| 2015 | European Indoor Championships | Prague, Czech Republic | 7th | Triple jump | 16.43 m |
| 2016 | European Championships | Amsterdam, Netherlands | 11th | Triple jump | 16.18 m |
| 2016 | Olympic Games | Rio de Janeiro, Brazil | 19th (q) | Triple jump | 16.52 m |
