= Rumen Dimitrov (triple jumper) =

Bulgarian triple jumper

Rumen Dimitrov (Bulgarian: Румен Димитров; born 19 September 1986) is a Bulgarian athlete specialising in the triple jump. He finished ninth at the 2014 European Championships and eighth at the 2015 European Indoor Championships.

His personal bests in the event are 16.87 metres outdoors (+1.7 m/s, Stara Zagora 2015) and 16.59 metres indoors (Bratislava 2016).

== Competition record ==
Year	Competition	Venue	Position	Event	Notes
Representing Bulgaria
2012	European Championships	Helsinki, Finland	25th (q)	Triple jump	15.60 m
2014	European Championships	Zürich, Switzerland	9th	Triple jump	16.43 m
2015	European Indoor Championships	Prague, Czech Republic	8th	Triple jump	16.36 m
2015	World Championships	Beijing, China	17th (q)	Triple jump	16.53 m
2016	Olympic Games	Rio de Janeiro, Brazil	26th (q)	Triple jump	16.36 m
2017	European Indoor Championships	Belgrade, Serbia	12th (q)	Triple jump	16.36 m
