= Georgi Tsonov =

Bulgarian triple jumper

Georgi Tsonov (Bulgarian: Георги Цонов; born 2 May 1993 in Sliven) is a Bulgarian athlete specialising in the triple jump. He won the silver at the 2015 European U23 Championships, as well as bronze medals at the 2010 Summer Youth Olympics and the 2011 European Junior Championships. His biggest success on senior level is the fifth place at the 2015 European Indoor Championships.

His father, Stoyko Tsonov, was also a triple jumper.

== Competition record ==
Year	Competition	Venue	Position	Event	Notes
Representing Bulgaria
2010	Youth Olympic Games	Singapore	3rd	Triple jump	15.80 m
2011	European Junior Championships	Tallinn, Estonia	3rd	Triple jump	15.90 m
2012	World Junior Championships	Barcelona, Spain	4th	Triple jump	16.10 m
2013	European Indoor Championships	Gothenburg, Sweden	9th (q)	Triple jump	16.58 m
2014	European Championships	Zürich, Switzerland	14th (q)	Triple jump	16.35 m
2015	European Indoor Championships	Prague, Czech Republic	20th (q)	Long jump	7.40 m
2015	European Indoor Championships	Prague, Czech Republic	5th	Triple jump	16.75 m
2015	European U23 Championships	Tallinn, Estonia	2nd	Triple jump	16.77 m
2015	World Championships	Beijing, China	16th (q)	Triple jump	16.59 m
2016	European Championships	Amsterdam, Netherlands	7th	Triple jump	16.53 m
2016	Olympic Games	Rio de Janeiro, Brazil	39th (q)	Triple jump	15.20 m
2017	European Indoor Championships	Belgrade, Serbia	8th	Triple jump	16.78 m
2017	World Championships	London, United Kingdom	18th (q)	Triple jump	16.53 m
2019	World Championships	Doha, Qatar	21st (q)	Triple jump	16.61 m
2021	European Indoor Championships	Toruń, Poland	11th (q)	Triple jump	16.16 m

== Personal bests ==
Outdoor

- Triple jump – 17.03 (+0,5.m/s) (Stara Zagora 2015)

Indoor

- Long jump – 7.67 (Bucharest 2015)
- Triple jump – 16.78 (Belgrade 2017)
