= Pablo Torrijos =

Spanish athlete (born 1992)

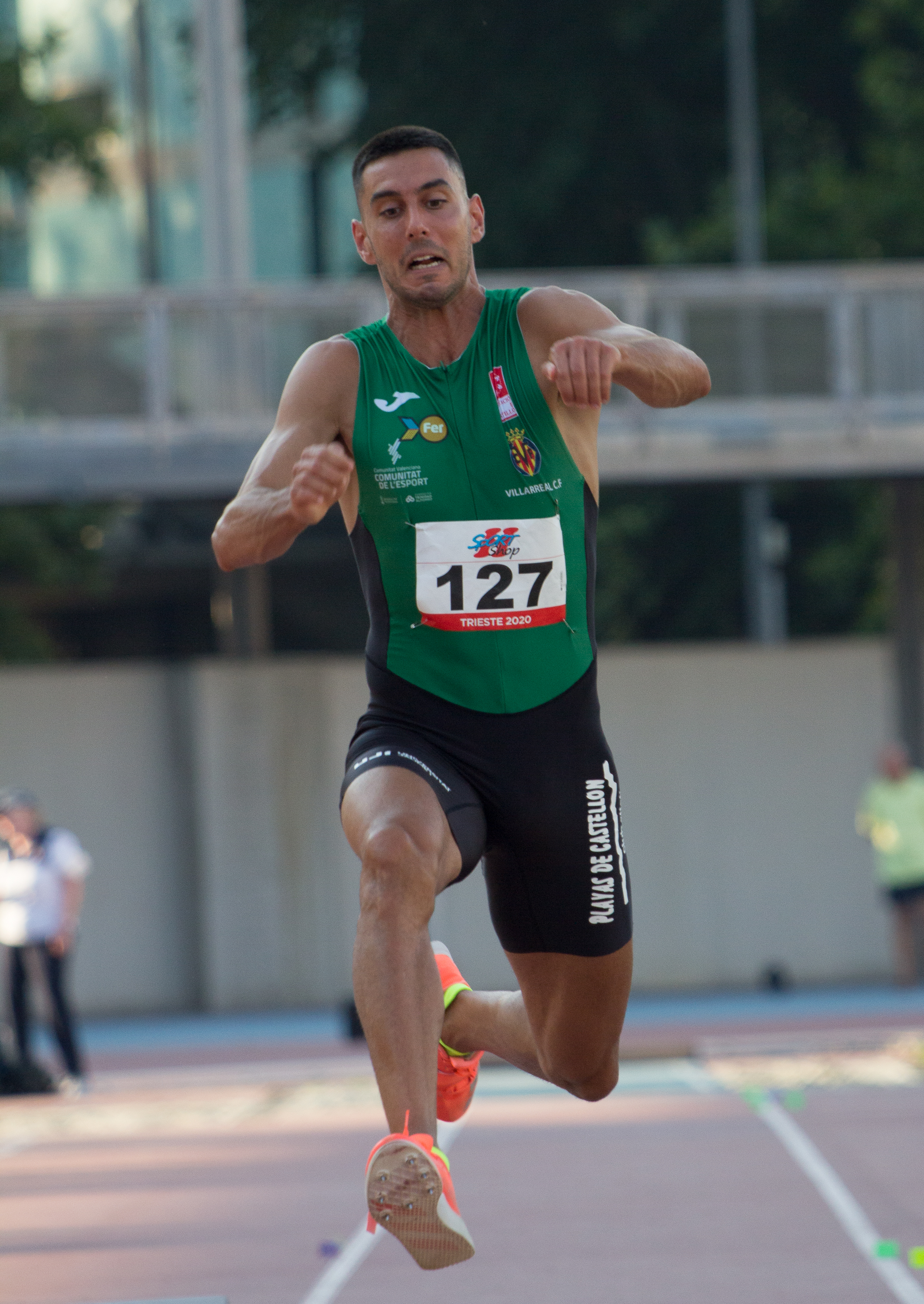
- Pablo Torrijos at the 2020 Triveneto Meeting in Trieste, Italy

Personal information
- Full name: Pablo Torrijos Navarro
- Nationality: Spanish
- Born: 12 May 1992 (age 34) Castellón de la Plana
- Height: 185 cm (6 ft 1 in)
- Weight: 76 kg (168 lb)
Medal record
Men's athletics
Representing Spain
European Athletics Indoor Championships
Silver medal – second place	2015 Prague	Triple jump

Pablo Torrijos Navarro (born 12 May 1992) is a Spanish track and field athlete who competes in the triple jump. He is the Spanish record holder with his best of 17.09 m (56 ft 3/4 in). He was the silver medallist at the 2015 European Athletics Indoor Championships.

== Career ==
Born in Castellón de la Plana, he became involved with athletics as a youth and joined a local club, Playas de Castellon. He was the Spanish indoor youth champion in the triple jump in 2008 and went on to make his debut at the 2009 World Youth Championships in Athletics, but was eliminated in the qualifiers of both his speciality and the long jump as well. He also competed at the European Youth Olympic Festival that year, placing seventh in his qualifying group in the long jump.

He placed eighth at the 2010 Gymnasiade, then came sixth at the 2011 European Athletics Junior Championships after winning his first Spanish junior title. He established himself nationally in 2013 by winning the triple jump title at the Spanish Athletics Championships. He was the Spanish under-23 champion indoors and out that year and also placed eighth at the 2013 European Athletics U23 Championships.

Torrijos began to reach an international standard in 2014. He was sixth at the 2014 European Team Championships Super League and was a finalist at the 2014 European Athletics Championships, coming eighth. He was the Spanish champion indoors and outdoors, and a new personal best of 16.87 m (55 ft 4 in) was a record for a Spanish under-23 athlete. He cleared seventeen metres for the first time in February 2015 and this mark of 17.03 m (55 ft 10 1/4 in), set at the Spanish Indoor Championships, proved to be the best ever by a Spaniard in any conditions.

== Personal bests ==
- Triple jump outdoor – 17.09 m (56 ft 3/4 in) (2020)
- Triple jump indoor – 17.18 m (56 ft 4 1/4 in) (2020)
- Long jump outdoor – 7.53 m (24 ft 8 1/4 in) (2012)
- Long jump indoor – 7.43 m (24 ft 4 1/2 in) (2011)
- Information from World Athletics athlete profile.

== International competitions ==
Year	Competition	Venue	Position	Event	Notes
Representing Spain
2009	World Youth Championships	Brixen, Italy	33rd (q)	Long jump	6.79 m (+1.0 m/s)
2009	World Youth Championships	Brixen, Italy	14th (q)	Triple jump	14.73 m (+0.9 m/s)
2009	European Youth Olympic Festival	Tampere, Finland	16th (q)	Long jump	6.77 m
2010	Gymnasiade	Doha, Qatar	8th	Triple jump	
2011	European Junior Championships	Tallinn, Estonia	6th	Triple jump	15.71 m
2013	European U23 Championships	Tampere, Finland	8th	Triple jump	16.06 m (-0.4 m/s)
2014	Mediterranean U23 Championship	Aubagne, France	1st	Triple jump	16,32 m
2014	European Championships	Zürich, Switzerland	8th	Triple jump	16.56 m
2015	European Indoor Championships	Prague, Czech Republic	2nd	Triple jump	17.04 m NR
2015	World Championships	Beijing, China	20th (q)	Triple jump	16.32 m
2016	World Indoor Championships	Portland, United States	7th	Triple jump	16.67 m
2016	European Championships	Amsterdam, Netherlands	8th	Triple jump	16.34 m
2016	Olympic Games	Rio de Janeiro, Brazil	31st (q)	Triple jump	16.11 m
2017	European Indoor Championships	Belgrade, Serbia	9th	Triple jump	16.73 m
2017	World Championships	London, United Kingdom	10th	Triple jump	16.60 m
2018	European Championships	Berlin, Germany	5th	Triple jump	16.74 m
2018	Ibero-American Championships	Trujillo, Peru	2nd	Triple jump	16.74 m
2019	European Indoor Championships	Glasgow, United Kingdom	15th (q)	Triple jump	16.18 m
2021	Olympic Games	Tokyo, Japan	25th (q)	Triple jump	15.87 m
2022	World Championships	Eugene, United States	23rd (q)	Triple jump	16.32 m
2022	European Championships	Munich, Germany	11th (q)	Triple jump	16.12 m (w)^{1}
2023	European Games	Chorzów, Poland	14th	Triple jump	15.57 m

^{1}No mark in the final

== National titles ==
- Spanish Athletics Championships
  - Triple jump: 2013, 2014
- Spanish Indoor Athletics Championships
  - Triple jump: 2014, 2015
