= Tobia Bocchi =

Italian triple jumper (born 1997)

Personal information
- National team: Italy (2 caps)
- Born: 7 April 1997 (age 29) Parma, Italy
- Height: 1.87 m (6 ft 2 in)
- Weight: 83 kg (183 lb)

Sport
- Sport: Athletics
- Event: Triple jump
- Club: C.S. Carabinieri
- Coached by: Renato Conte

Achievements and titles
- Personal bests: Triple jump outdoor: 17.14 m (2021); Triple jump indoor: 16.89 m (2021)
Medal record
Men's athletics
Representing Italy
European Games
Gold medal – first place	2023 Kraków-Małopolska	Triple jump
Mediterranean Games
Silver medal – second place	2022 Oran	Triple jump
Youth Olympic Games
Silver medal – second place	2014 Nanjing	Triple jump
European U20 Championships
Silver medal – second place	2015 Eskilstuna	Triple jump

Tobia Bocchi (born 7 April 1997) is an Italian triple jumper. He competed at the 2020 Summer Olympics, in Triple jump.

== Career ==
At the youth level, Bocchi boasts two under-20 silver medals at the 2014 Summer Youth Olympics and at the 2015 European Athletics Junior Championships.

== Progression ==
Personal best

Outdoor

Year (age)	Performance	Venue	Date
2021 (24)	17.14 +0.1	(Italy) Rovereto	17 JUN 2021
2020 (23)	16.62 +2.0	(Italy) Trieste	01 AUG 2020
2019 (22)	16.73 +0.7	(Sweden) Gävle	13 JUL 2019
2018 (21)	16.28 +1.6	(Italy) Savona	23 MAY 2018
2016 (24)	15.94 0.0	(Spain) Mataró	06 JUL 2016
2015 (20)	16.54 -0.4	(Italy) Turin	26 JUL 2015
2014 (19)	16.04 +1.2	(Italy) Rieti	22 JUN 2014
2013 (18)	15.57 -0.2	(Brazil) Brasília	03 DEC 2013
2012 (17)	14.61 +1.3	(Italy) Jesolo	06 OCT 2012

== Achievements ==
Senior level

Year	Competition	Venue	Rank	Event	Performance	Notes
2019	European Indoor Championships	(United Kingdom) Glasgow	13th	Triple jump	16.23 m	NQ
2021	European Indoor Championships	(Poland) Toruń	4th	Triple jump	16.65 m	
2022	Mediterranean Games	(Algeria) Oran	2nd	Triple jump	16.93 m	
2022	World Championships	(United States) Eugene	15th	Triple jump	16.58 m	NQ
2022	European Championships	(Germany) Munchen	4th	Triple jump	16.79 m	
2023	European Indoor Championships	(Turkey) Istanbul	6th	Triple jump	16.39 m	(Note: He jumped a better measure (16.47 m) in qualify)

== National titles ==
Bocchi won 3 national championships at individual senior level.

- Italian Athletics Championships
  - Triple jump: 2021
- Italian Athletics Indoor Championships
  - Triple jump: 2021, 2023

== See also ==
- Italian all-time lists - Triple jump
