= Nikolaos Andrikopoulos =

Greek triple jumper (born 1997)

Personal information
- Nationality: Greek
- Born: 17 April 1997 (age 29) Athens, Greece
- Height: 1.86
- Weight: 73

Sport
- Country: Greece
- Sport: Athletics
- Event: Triple jump

Achievements and titles
- Personal bests: 16.73 m (2021); 16.58 m (i) (2023)
Medal record
Men's athletics
Representing Greece
European Indoor Championships
Silver medal – second place	2023 Istanbul	Triple jump

Nikolaos Andrikopoulos (Greek: Νικόλαος (Νίκος) Ανδρικόπουλος; born 17 April 1997) is a Greek triple jumper. He represented Greece at the 2023 European Indoor Championships in Istanbul. He won the silver medal in the final with a jump of 16.58 metres.

== Competition record ==
Representing Greece
Year	Competition	Venue	Position	Notes
2019	European U23 Championships	Gävle, Sweden	18th (q)	15.63m
2021	European Indoor Championships	Toruń, Poland	13th (q)	15.61m
2021	Balkan Championships	Smederevo, Serbia	1st	16.73m PB
2022	World Indoor Championships	Berlin, Germany	12th	16.05m
2022	European Championships	Munich, Germany	19th (q)	15.39m
2022	Balkan Championships	Craiova, Romania	1st	16.29m
2023	European Indoor Championships	Istanbul, Turkey	2nd	16.58m SB
2023	World Championships	Budapest, Hungary	27th (q)	15.77 m
2025	Balkan Championships	Volos, Greece	2nd	16.21 m
2026	European Championships	Birmingham, United Kingdom	21st (q)	15.54 m
