= Jonathan Seremes =

French triple jumper (born 2000)

Personal information
- Born: 3 September 2000 (age 26) Poissy, France
- Height: 193 cm (6 ft 4 in)
- Weight: 74 kg (163 lb)

Sport
- Country: France
- Sport: Athletics
- Event: Triple jump

Achievements and titles
- Personal bests: Triple jump: 17.08m (Paris, 2025)
Medal record
Men's athletics
Representing France
World U20 Championships
Bronze medal – third place	2018 Tampere	Triple jump

Jonathan Seremes (born 3 September 2000) is a French triple jumper.

== Biography ==
Seremes was a bronze medalist at the 2018 World Athletics U20 Championships in Tampere, Finland.

Competing for the University of Missouri he won the Southeastern Conference Indoor Championship triple jump title with a distance of 16.97 metres in February 2025. He then also won the 2025 NCAA Division I Indoor Track and Field Championships triple jump title in Virginia Beach in March 2025 with a jump of 17.04 metres.

Seremes jumped 17.08 metres to finish fourth overall in the 2025 Diamond League event at the 2025 Meeting de Paris in June 2025. Later that month, he produced a final round jump of 17.00m (-0.1 m/s) to win the triple jump at the 2025 European Athletics Team Championships First Division in Madrid. In September 2025, he was a finalist at the 2025 World Championships in Tokyo, Japan, placing eighth overall.

Seremes later transferred to the Texas Tech Red Raiders track and field team. He jumped 17.25 metres to win the 2026 NCAA Indoor Championships in the United States on 14 March 2026. That month, he placed fifth overall for France at the 2026 World Athletics Indoor Championships in Toruń, Poland, with a best jump of 16.93 metres. In June, he qualified for the 2026 NCAA Outdoor Championships, placing fifth with a jump of 16.48 metres. In August 2026, he competed at the 2026 European Athletics Championships in Birmingham, England, placing seventh overall.
