= Pedro Pichardo =

Cuban-born Portuguese triple jumper (born 1993)

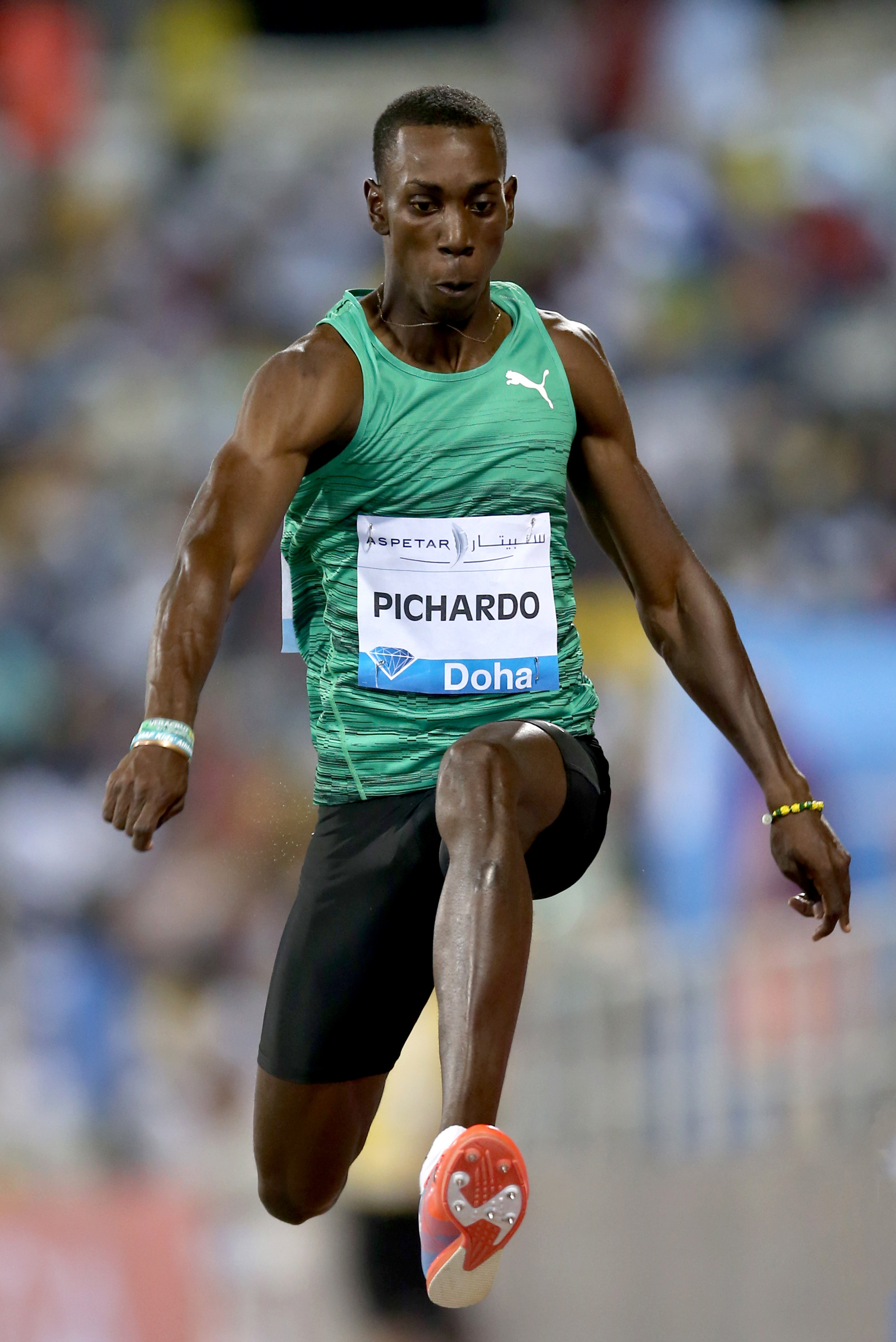
- Pichardo competing at the Qatar Athletic Super Grand Prix in May 2015

Personal information
- Full name: Pedro Pablo Pichardo Peralta
- Nickname: 4P
- Nationality: Portuguese
- Born: 30 June 1993 (age 33) Santiago de Cuba, Cuba
- Height: 1.86 m (6 ft 1 in)
- Weight: 71 kg (157 lb)

Sport
- Country: Portugal
- Sport: Athletics
- Event: Triple jump
- Club: S.L. Benfica
- Coached by: Jorge Pichardo (his father)

Achievements and titles
- Olympic finals: 2020 Tokyo, Gold
- Highest world ranking: 1 (weeks 99)
- Personal bests: Triple jump: 18.08 m (59 ft 3 3/4 in) NR (for Cuba); 18.04 m (59 ft 2 in) (Portugal) NR; Indoors; Triple jump: 17.48 m (57 ft 4 in) NR
Medal record
Men's athletics
Representing Portugal
Olympic Games
Gold medal – first place	2020 Tokyo	Triple jump
Silver medal – second place	2024 Paris	Triple jump
World Championships
Gold medal – first place	2022 Eugene	Triple jump
Gold medal – first place	2025 Tokyo	Triple jump
World Indoor Championships
Silver medal – second place	2022 Belgrade	Triple jump
European Championships
Gold medal – first place	2022 Munich	Triple jump
Silver medal – second place	2024 Rome	Triple jump
Silver medal – second place	2026 Birmingham	Triple jump
European Indoor Championships
Gold medal – first place	2021 Toruń	Triple jump
Gold medal – first place	2023 Istanbul	Triple jump
Diamond League
First place	2018	Triple jump
First place	2021	Triple jump
First place	2024	Triple jump
European Team Championships
Silver medal – second place	2021 Chorzów (SL)	Triple jump
Gold medal – first place	2019 Sandnes (FL)	Triple jump
Representing Cuba
World Championships
Silver medal – second place	2013 Moscow	Triple jump
Silver medal – second place	2015 Beijing	Triple jump
World Indoor Championships
Silver medal – second place	2014 Sopot	Triple jump
Pan American Games
Gold medal – first place	2015 Toronto	Triple jump
World Junior Championships
Gold medal – first place	2012 Barcelona	Triple jump
CAC Junior Championships
Gold medal – first place	2012 San Salvador	Triple jump

Pedro Pablo Pichardo Peralta (Spanish pronunciation: [piˈtʃaɾðo], Portuguese pronunciation: [piˈʃaɾðu]; born 30 June 1993) is a Cuban-born Portuguese triple jumper. He won the gold medal at the 2020 Summer Olympics with a Portuguese national record of 17.98 m (58 ft 11 3/4 in) and the silver medal at the 2024 Summer Olympics. He was world champion in 2022, and could not defend his title in 2023 due to injury.

Pichardo was the 2012 World Junior Champion and the 2013 World Championship silver medalist. His 17.79 m (58 ft 4 1/4 in) in early 2014 was the best triple jump of the year. In 2015, his 17.94 m (58 ft 10 1/4 in) made him the #6 performer ever. A week later he improved to 18.06 m (59 ft 3 in), making him the No. 3 performer ever and the best performance the world has seen since 1996 (when Pichardo was only three years old).

== Career ==
On 15 May 2015, Pichardo jumped 18.06 m (59 ft 3 in) (0.9 m/s) at the Qatar Athletic Super Grand Prix. His performance made him the number 3 performer ever at the time. With Christian Taylor also jumping 18.04 m (59 ft 2 in) minutes later, this was the first competition in history to have two men jump over 18 m, being called "the greatest triple jump competition ever." Pichardo's 18.06 m also improved his own Cuban national record of 17.94 m (58 ft 10 1/4 in) set one week earlier in Havana. That mark erased Yoelbi Quesada's nearly 18-year-old record, and put Pichardo in position #6 of the all-time top ten performers. Back in 2013, Pichardo had won Athletissima with a mark of 17.58 m.

On 28 May 2015, Pichardo jumped 18.08 m (59 ft 3 3/4 in) (0.0 m/s) at the Copa Cuba-Memorial Barrientos meet in Havana, improving his own Cuban national record set two weeks earlier by 2 cm.

In April 2017, Pichardo disappeared from the Cuban national team's meeting in Stuttgart, Germany, appearing in Portugal days later. After signing a contract with Portuguese club S.L. Benfica on 27 April, he gained Portuguese citizenship on 7 December and was eligible to compete for Portugal on international stage since August 2019. Therefore, the first major competition in which Pichardo represented the Portuguese colours was the 2019 World Championships, finishing fourth in the final.

On 4 May 2018, Pichardo established a new triple jump national record for Portugal with a winning jump of 17.95 m during the Doha leg of 2018 Diamond League series. He also won gold medals at the 2019 IAAF Diamond League, with a personal season best of 17.53 m, and at the 2020 IAAF Diamond League, with a mark of 17.40 m.

Representing Portugal, Pichardo won the gold medal at the 2021 European Athletics Indoor Championships on 7 March 2021. On 6 July, Pichardo jumped 17.92 m (+0.4) at the Gyulai István Memorial, beating Hugues Fabrice Zango.

On 5 August 2021, Pichardo competed in the 2020 Summer Olympics in Tokyo, Japan representing Portugal. He won the gold medal in the triple jump event and the country's fifth ever gold medal.

== Achievements ==
Year	Competition	Venue	Position	Event	Measure	Notes
Representing Cuba
2012	World Junior Championships	Barcelona	1st	Triple jump	16.79 m	WJL
2013	World Championships	Moscow	2nd	Triple jump	17.68 m	
2014	World Indoor Championships	Sopot	2nd	Triple jump	17.24 m	
2015	Pan American Games	Toronto	1st	Triple jump	17.54 m	
2015	World Championships	Beijing	2nd	Triple jump	17.73 m	
Representing Portugal
2019	World Championships	Doha	4th	Triple jump	17.62 m	
2021	European Indoor Championships	Toruń	1st	Triple jump	17.30 m	
2021	Olympic Games	Tokyo	1st	Triple jump	17.98 m	NR
2022	World Indoor Championships	Belgrade	2nd	Triple jump	17.46 m	NIR
2022	World Championships	Eugene	1st	Triple jump	17.95 m	
2022	European Championships	Munich	1st	Triple jump	17.50 m	
2023	European Indoor Championships	Istanbul	1st	Triple jump	17.60 m	NIR
2024	European Championships	Rome	2nd	Triple jump	18.04 m	
2024	Olympic Games	Paris	2nd	Triple jump	17.84 m	
2025	World Championships	Tokyo	1st	Triple jump	17.91 m	WL
2026	European Championships	Birmingham	2nd	Triple jump	17.76 m	

== Personal bests ==
Event		Measure	Venue	Date	Notes
Triple jump	Outdoor	18.08 m	Havana	28 May 2015	NR for Cuba
Triple jump	Indoor	17.60 m	Istanbul	3 March 2023	NR for Portugal

- All information taken from World Athletics profile.

== See also ==
- Portugal at the Olympics
