= Melvin Raffin =

French triple jumper

Personal information
- Born: 9 August 1998 (age 28) Bourg-la-Reine, France
- Height: 1.86 m (6 ft 1 in)
- Weight: 66 kg (146 lb)

Sport
- Country: France
- Sport: Athletics
- Event: Triple jump
- Club: Entente Nîmes Athlétisme
- Coached by: Laurence Bily; Teddy Tamgho

Melvin Raffin (born 9 August 1998 in Bourg-la-Reine) is a French athlete specialising in the triple jump.

== Career ==
Raffin represented his country at the 2017 World Championships without qualifying for the final. Additionally, he won bronze medals at the 2016 World U20 Championships and 2017 European U20 Championships.

His personal bests in the event are 16.85 metres outdoors (+0.6 m/s, Montgeron 2017) and 17.20 metres indoors (Belgrade 2017). He is the current world junior record holder indoors.

== Personal life ==
Born in mainland France, Raffin is of Martiniquais descent.

== International competitions ==
Year	Competition	Venue	Position	Event	Notes
Representing France
2015	World Youth Championships	Cali, Colombia	11th	Triple jump	14.61 m
2016	World U20 Championships	Bydgoszcz, Poland	3rd	Triple jump	16.37 m
2017	European Indoor Championships	Belgrade, Serbia	5th	Triple jump	16.92 m
2017	European U20 Championships	Grosseto, Italy	3rd	Triple jump	16.82 m
2017	World Championships	London, United Kingdom	24th (q)	Triple jump	16.18 m
2021	European Indoor Championships	Toruń, Poland	14th (q)	Triple jump	15.29 m
2021	Olympic Games	Tokyo, Japan	11th (q)	Triple jump	16.83 m^{1}
2022	World Indoor Championships	Belgrade, Serbia	6th	Triple jump	16.68 m
2025	World Indoor Championships	Nanjing, China	–	Triple jump	NM
2026	World Indoor Championships	Toruń, Poland	–	Triple jump	NM

^{1}No mark in the final
