= Thomas Gogois =

French athlete (born 2000)

Personal information
- Nationality: French
- Born: Anael-Thomas Gogois; 24 June 2000 (age 26) Amiens, France

Sport
- Sport: Athletics
- Event: Triple jump

Achievements and titles
- Personal bests: Triple jump: 17.38m (Rome, 2024)
Medal record
Men's athletics
Representing France
European Championships
Bronze medal – third place	2024 Rome	Triple jump
European U23 Championships
Bronze medal – third place	2021 Tallinn	Triple jump

Thomas Gogois (born 24 June 2000) is a French triple jumper. He won the bronze medal at the 2024 European Championships in Rome and competed at the 2024 Olympic Games in Paris.

== Biography ==
Gogois is a member of Amiens UC Athletics having joined the club at the age of six years-old. He started out as a sprinter but from the age of 15 years-old began to specialise in the triple jump. He has been trained by Alain Doré in Amiens since he was 15 years old, apart from one season spent at the National Institute of Sport and Performance (INSEP) in Paris.

Gogois was a bronze medalist at the 2021 European Athletics U23 Championships in Tallinn, Estonia, with a best jump of 16.65 metres. By 2022, he had become a professional athlete. He finished in second place at the 2022 French Indoor Athletics Championships in Miramas in February 2022. He went into the event with a personal best of 16.57 metres, but increased it to 16.63 metres on the day.

Gogois jumped a personal best of 16.87m in Forbach in May 2024. He was a bronze medalist at the 2024 European Athletics Championships in Rome with a personal best jump of 17.38m, the first time he had jumped over 17 metres. He competed in the triple jump at the 2024 Paris Olympics where he jumped 16.77 metres but did not progress to the final, missing out on a qualifying mark by 2 centimetres.

Gogois was selected for the 2025 European Athletics Indoor Championships in Appeldoorn, Netherlands, where he placed fourth overall in the triple jump final with a best jump of 16.51 metres. He finished third in the 2025 Diamond League event at the 2025 Meeting de Paris in June 2025 and fifth the following month in Monaco at the 2025 Herculis. In September 2025, he competed at the 2025 World Championships in Tokyo, Japan.

On 26 July 2026, Gogois won the triple jump at the French Championships in Albi with a jump of 17.02 metres. On 15 August, Gogois finished fourth with a jump of 17.21 metres at the 2026 European Athletics Championships in Birmingham, England.

== Personal life ==
He is from Amiens.
