= Andreas Pantazis =

Greek triple jumper (born 2000)

Personal information
- Nationality: Greek
- Born: 4 June 2000 (age 26)

Sport
- Country: Greece
- Sport: Athletics
- Event: Triple jump
- Coached by: Dimitris Vassilikos

Achievements and titles
- Highest world ranking: 50
- Personal bests: 17.19 m* (2023) *Not legal (wind: 5,2) 16.91 m (2023); 16.79 m (i) (2022)
Medal record
Men's athletics
Representing Greece
European U20 Championships
Bronze medal – third place	2019 Borås	Triple jump

Andreas Pantazis (Greek: Ανδρέας Πανταζής; born 4 June 2000) is a Greek triple jumper who represented Greece at the 2019 European Under-20 Championships, taking the third place.

== Competition record ==
Representing Greece
Year	Competition	Venue	Position	Notes
2019	European U20 Championships	Borås, Sweden	3rd	16.08 m PB
2021	European Team Championships	Cluj-Napoca, Romania	3rd	16.18 m
2021	European U23 Championships	Tallinn, Estonia	5th	16.20 m
2022	European Championships	Munich, Germany	18th (q)	15.86 m
2023	European Indoor Championships	Istanbul, Turkey	12th (q)	16.06 m
2023	World Championships	Budapest, Hungary	31st (q)	14.67 m
2024	European Championships	Rome, Italy	27th (q)	15.36 m
2026	World Indoor Championships	Torun, Poland	16th	15.45 m
2026	European Championships	Birmingham, United Kingdom	15th (q)	15.94 m
