= Dimitrios Tsiamis =

Greek triple jumper (born 1982)

Medal record

Representing Greece

European Championships
Bronze medal – third place	2018 Berlin	Triple jump

Mediterranean Games
Silver medal – second place	Pescara 2009	Triple jump
Silver medal – second place	Mersin 2013	Triple jump

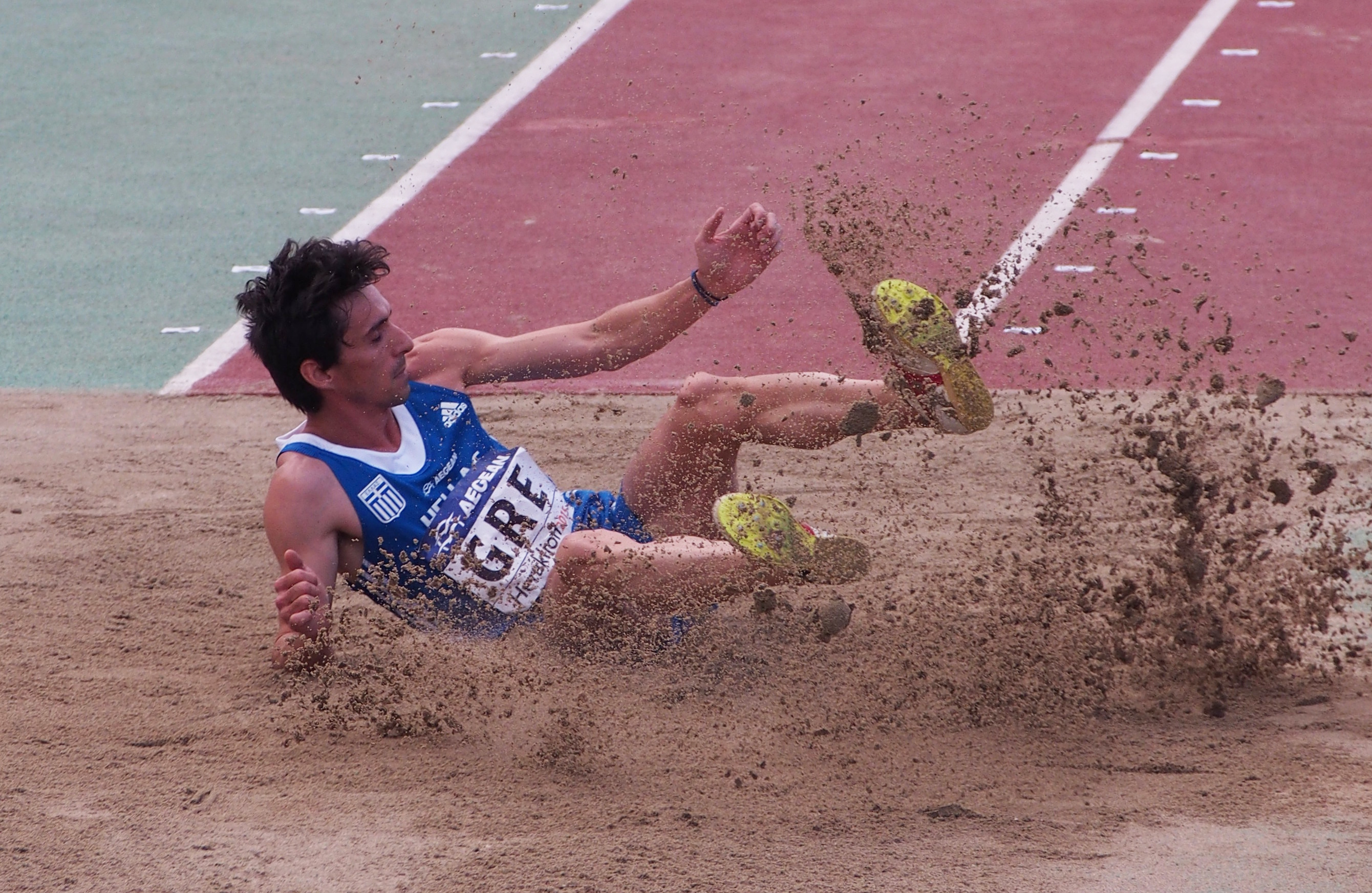
Dimitris Tsiamis at 2015 European Team Championships First League

Dimitrios Tsiamis (Greek: Δημήτριος Τσιάμης; born 12 January 1982 in Karditsa) is a Greek triple jumper.

He finished eighth at the 2006 IAAF World Indoor Championships in Moscow. He won the bronze medal at the 2018 European Championships in Berlin. He holds the record of national titles in triple jump, with 19 wins in the Greek indoor Championships (2008–2025) and 12 wins in the Greek outdoor Championships (2007–2024).

== Personal bests ==
Event	Performance	Date	Venue
Triple jump	17.55 m (NR)	18 June 2006	Thessaloniki, Greece
Triple jump (indoor)	17.06 m (NR)	2 February 2011	Peania, Greece

== Competition record ==
Representing Greece
Year	Competition	Venue	Position	Notes
2000	World Junior Championships	Santiago, Chile	14th (q)	15.58 m (+0.5 m/s)
2006	World Indoor Championships	Moscow, Russia	8th	16.94 m
2007	World Championships	Osaka, Japan	12th	16.59 m
2008	Olympic Games	Beijing, China	23rd (q)	16.65 m
2009	Mediterranean Games	Pescara, Italy	2nd	16.98 m
2009	World Championships	Berlin, Germany	33rd (q)	16.23 m
2010	World Indoor Championships	Doha, Qatar	11th (q)	16.53 m
2010	European Championships	Barcelona, Spain	13th	16.31 m
2011	European Indoor Championships	Paris, France	14th (q)	16.30 m
2012	European Championships	Helsinki, Finland	9th	16.52 m
2013	European Indoor Championships	Gothenburg, Sweden	16th (q)	16.28 m
2013	Mediterranean Games	Mersin, Turkey	2nd	17.00 m
2013	World Championships	Moscow, Russia	10th	16.66 m
2014	European Championships	Zurich, Switzerland	10th	16.39 m
2016	European Championships	Amsterdam, Netherlands	22nd (q)	16.16 m (w)
2017	World Championships	London, United Kingdom	28th (q)	16.06 m
2018	European Championships	Berlin, Germany	3rd	16.78 m
2021	European Indoor Championships	Toruń, Poland	7th	16.40 m
2021	Olympic Games	Tokyo, Japan	–	NM
2022	European Championships	Munich, Germany	15th (q)	15.99 m
2023	European Indoor Championships	Istanbul, Turkey	7th	16.39 m
2023	World Championships	Budapest, Hungary	23rd (q)	16.22 m
2024	World Indoor Championships	Glasgow, United Kingdom	14th	15.95 m
2024	European Championships	Rome, Italy	15th (q)	16.33 m
2025	European Indoor Championships	Apeldoorn, Netherlands	13th (q)	15.86 m
2026	Balkan Championships	Volos, Greece	3rd	16.18 m
2026	European Championships	Birmingham, United Kingdom	8th	16.27 m
