= Jordan Díaz (triple jumper) =

Spanish triple jumper (born 2001)

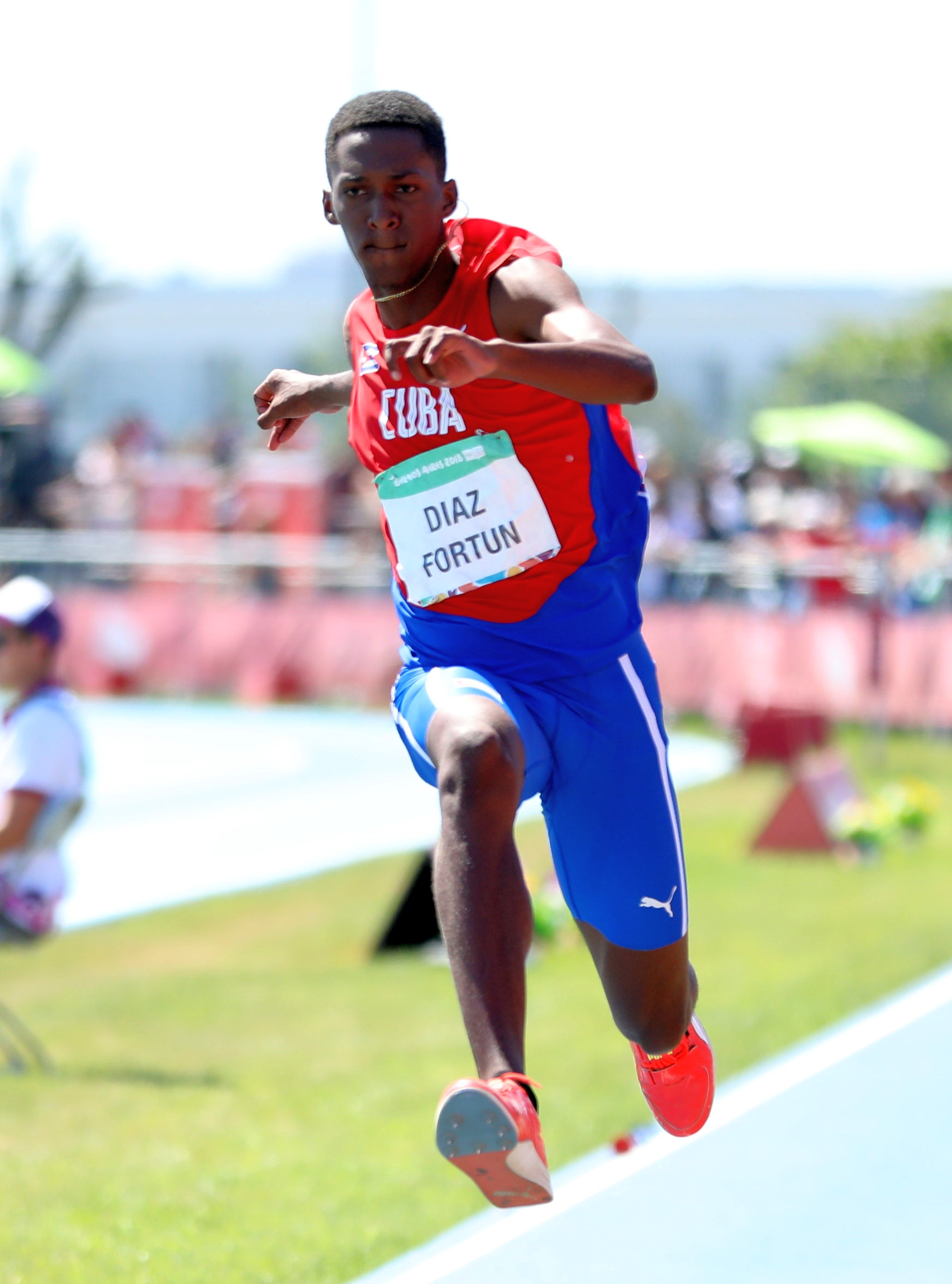
- Díaz at the 2018 Summer Youth Olympics

Personal information
- Full name: Jordan Alejandro Díaz Fortún
- Nationality: Cuban; Spanish (since 2022)
- Born: 23 February 2001 (age 25) Havana, Cuba
- Height: 1.90 m (6 ft 3 in)

Sport
- Country: Cuba (until 2022); Spain (from 2024)
- Sport: Track and field
- Event: Triple jump
- Team: FC Barcelona Athletics

Achievements and titles
- Personal bests: 18.18 m NR (2024)
Medal record
Men's athletics
Representing Spain
Olympic Games
Gold medal – first place	2024 Paris	Triple jump
European Championships
Gold medal – first place	2024 Rome	Triple jump
Representing Cuba
Pan American Games
Silver medal – second place	2019 Lima	Triple jump
NACAC Championships
Gold medal – first place	2018 Toronto	Triple jump
World U20 Championships
Gold medal – first place	2018 Tampere	Triple jump
Youth Olympic Games
Gold medal – first place	2018 Buenos Aires	Triple jump
World U18 Championships
Gold medal – first place	2017 Nairobi	Triple jump
Central American and Caribbean Games
Silver medal – second place	2018 Barranquilla	Triple jump
- Updated on 11 June 2024

Jordan Alejandro Díaz Fortún (born 23 February 2001) is a Cuban-born Spanish triple jumper. At the 2024 Summer Olympics in Paris, he won a gold medal with a jump of 17.86 m.

== Career ==
He won the gold medal at the 2017 World Youth Championships, the 2018 World U20 Championships, the 2018 NACAC Championships, the silver medal at the 2018 Central American and Caribbean Games and won the gold medal at the Youth Olympic Games in 2018.

His personal best jump is 18.18 metres, achieved in June 2024. At the 2017 World Youth Championships he jumped 17.30 metres, a new championship record and world under-18 best mark, improving it further in 2018.

On 28 June 2021, he defected from the Cuban delegation sent to a preparatory competition in Castellón, Spain. He thus missed the Tokyo Olympics. He began to train under Iván Pedroso in Guadalajara. Shortly after acquiring Spanish citizenship in 2022, Díaz beat the country's triple jump record.

World Athletics declared Díaz eligible to represent Spain starting on 7 June 2024, just in time to compete in the 2024 European Athletics Championships, where he won gold with a best jump of 18.18 m which put him third in the world all-time list.
