= Gabriel Wallmark =

Swedish triple jumper (born 2002)

Personal information
- National team: Sweden
- Born: 21 January 2002 (age 24)
- Height: 185 cm (6 ft 1 in)

Sport
- Country: Sweden
- Sport: Athletics
- Event: Triple Jump
- Club: Örgryte Friidrott
- Coached by: Yannick Tregaro

Achievements and titles
- Personal best: Outdoor: 16.43 (2021)
Medal record
World U20 Championships
Gold medal – first place	2021 Nairobi	Triple jump
European U20 Championships
Gold medal – first place	2021 Tallinn	Triple jump
National Championships
Gold medal – first place	2021 Borås	Triple jump

Gabriel Wallmark (born 21 January 2002) is a Swedish athlete who specializes in the triple jump. He was the gold medallist at the World Athletics U20 Championships in 2021 and at the European Athletics U20 Championships as well as the Swedish Senior National Championships 2021.
