= Simone Biasutti =

Italian triple jumper (born 1999)

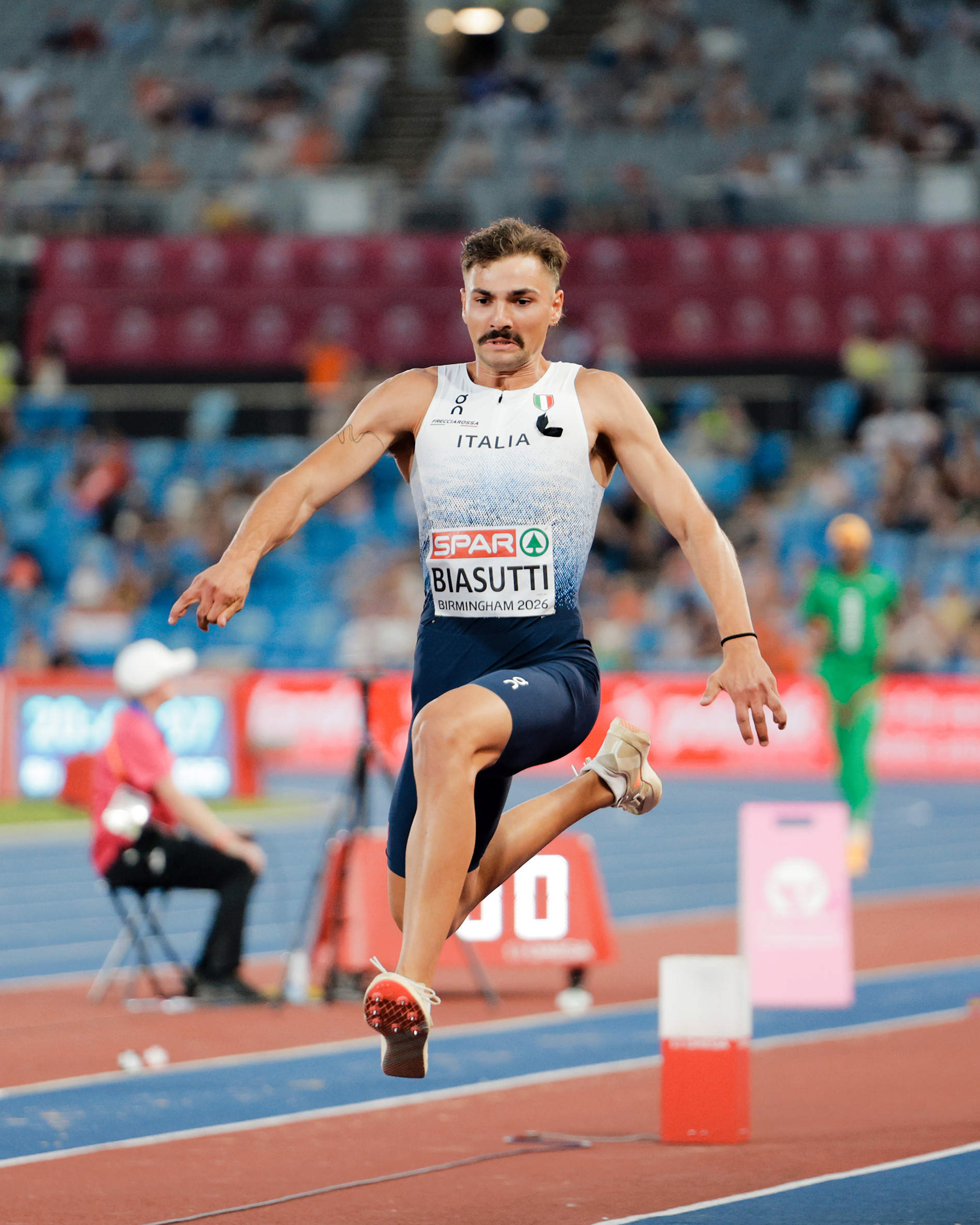
- Biasutti at Birmingham 2026

Personal information
- National team: Italy: 4 caps (2025-)
- Born: 1 October 1999 (age 26) Trieste, Italy
- Height: 1.84 m (6 ft 0 in)
- Weight: 74 kg (163 lb)

Sport
- Sport: Athletics
- Event: Triple jump
- Club: Fiamme Gialle
- Coached by: Ennio Buttò

Achievements and titles
- Personal best: Triple jump: 17.32 (2026)

Simone Biasutti (born 1 October 1999) is an Italian triple jumper. He was the Italian national indoor champion in 2022, winning the Italian Indoor Athletics Championships. He has competed for Italy at multiple major championships, including the 2025 World Athletics Indoor Championships in Nanjing, China.

== Career ==
From Trieste, he trained as a member of Trieste Atletica under the guidance of Claudio Longanes, and later became a member of the Gruppi Sportivi Fiamme Gialle and was trained by Olympic bronze medalist Fabrizio Donato and then by Andrea Matarazzo. In 2023, he moved to Piacenza, Italy, under the guidance of Ennio Buttò.

In September 2020, he was runner-up to Andrea Dallavalle at the Italian junior championships. In July 2021, he set a personal best in the triple jump of 16.61 metres whilst competing in Naples, Italy.

He won the 2022 Italian Athletics Indoor Championships in Ancona, Italy, with a distance of 16.23 metres. He competed at the 2023 European Athletics Indoor Championships in Istanbul, Turkey, finishing tenth in his qualifying pool with a best jump of 16.20 metres, and did not proceed into the final.

He jumped a new personal best 16.67 metres in Ancona, Italy, in February 2025. He competed at the 2025 European Athletics Indoor Championships in Apeldoorn, Netherlands, but his best jump of 15.90 metres left him in twelfth place in the qualifying pool and did not progress amongst the best eight into the final. He was selected for the 2025 World Athletics Championships in Nanjing, China, where he finished ninth overall with a best jump of 16.37 metres.

He jumped a personal best 16.94 metres to finish second in the triple jump at the 2025 European Athletics Team Championships First Division in Madrid.

In July 2026, Biasutti broke the 17 metre-barrier for the first time in his career, placing second to Andy Díaz at the Italian Championships with 17.32m, improving his personal best by 38 centimetres. In August, he was a finalist at the 2026 European Athletics Championships in Birmingham, England.

== Achievements ==
| Year | Competition | Venue | Position | Event | Measure | Notes |
|---|---|---|---|---|---|---|
| 2016 | European Youth Championships | (Georgia (country)) Tbilisi | 11th | Triple jump | 14.08 m | |
| 2018 | World U20 Championships | (Finland) Tampere | 12th | Triple jump | 15.14 m | |
| 2019 | European U23 Championships | (Sweden) Gävle | 21st (q) | Triple jump | 15.36 m | |
| 2021 | European U23 Championships | (Estonia) Tallinn | 6th | Triple jump | 16.00 m | |
| 2023 | European Indoor Championships | (Turkey) Istanbul | 10th (q) | Triple jump | 16.20 m | |
| 2025 | European Indoor Championships | (Netherlands) Apeldoorn | 12th (q) | Triple jump | 15.90 m | |
| 2025 | World Indoor Championships | (China) Nanjing | 9th | Triple jump | 16.37 m | |
| 2025 | European Team Championships | (Spain) Madrid | 2nd | Triple jump | 16.94 m | PB |
| 2026 | European Championships | (United Kingdom) Birmingham | Final | Triple jump | NM | (Note: He qualified to the final with big Q 16.71 m, the third of the top) |

== Progression ==
Personal best

Outdoor

| Year (age) | Performance | Venue | Date |
|---|---|---|---|
| 2026 (27) | 17.32 +0.5 | (Italy) Florence | 25 July 2026 |
| 2025 (26) | 16.94 +0.6 | (Spain) Madrid | 27 June 2025 |
| 2024 (25) | 16.35 +1.5 | (Italy) Modena | 28 April 2024 |
| 2023 (24) | 16.38 (i) | (Italy) Ancona | 15 January 2023 |
| 2022 (23) | 16.53 +0.1 | (Italy) Grosseto | 22 May 2022 |
| 2021 (22) | 16.61 +0.1 | (Italy) Naples | 20 July 2021 |
| 2020 (21) | 16.40 +0.6 | (Italy) Trieste | 1 August 2020 |
| 2019 (20) | 16.31 +1.6 | (Italy) Rieti | 9 June 2019 |
| 2018 (19) | 15.70 +1.1 | (Italy) Agropoli | 3 June 2018 |
| 2017 (18) | 15.50 +0.6 | (Italy) Florence | 11 June 2017 |
| 2016 (17) | 14.67 0.0 | (Italy) Bressanone | 15 May 2016 |
| 2015 (16) | 12.84 -1.5 | (Italy) Orvieto | 3 October 2015 |

== National titles ==
Biasutti won a national championship at individual senior level.

- Italian Athletics Indoor Championships
  - Triple jump: 2022

== See also ==
- Italian all-time lists - Triple jump
