= Tiago Pereira (athlete) =

Portuguese triple jumper

Personal information
- Full name: Tiago João Luís Pereira
- Nationality: Portuguese
- Born: 19 September 1993 (age 33) Lisbon, Portugal
- Height: 194 cm (6 ft 4 in)
- Weight: 77 kg (170 lb)

Sport
- Country: Portugal
- Sport: Athletics
- Event: Triple jump
- Club: Sporting CP
- Coached by: João Ganço
Medal record
Representing Portugal
World Indoor Championships
Bronze medal – third place	2024 Glasgow	Triple jump

Tiago João Luís Pereira (born 19 September 1993) is a Portuguese athlete who competes for Portugal and the sports club Sporting Clube de Portugal. Pereira competed in the men's triple jump at the 2020 Tokyo Olympics, where he placed 9th. At the 2024 World Athletics Indoor Championships he was third, being awarded a bronze medal in the competition.
