= La Nucia =

La Nucia La Nucía
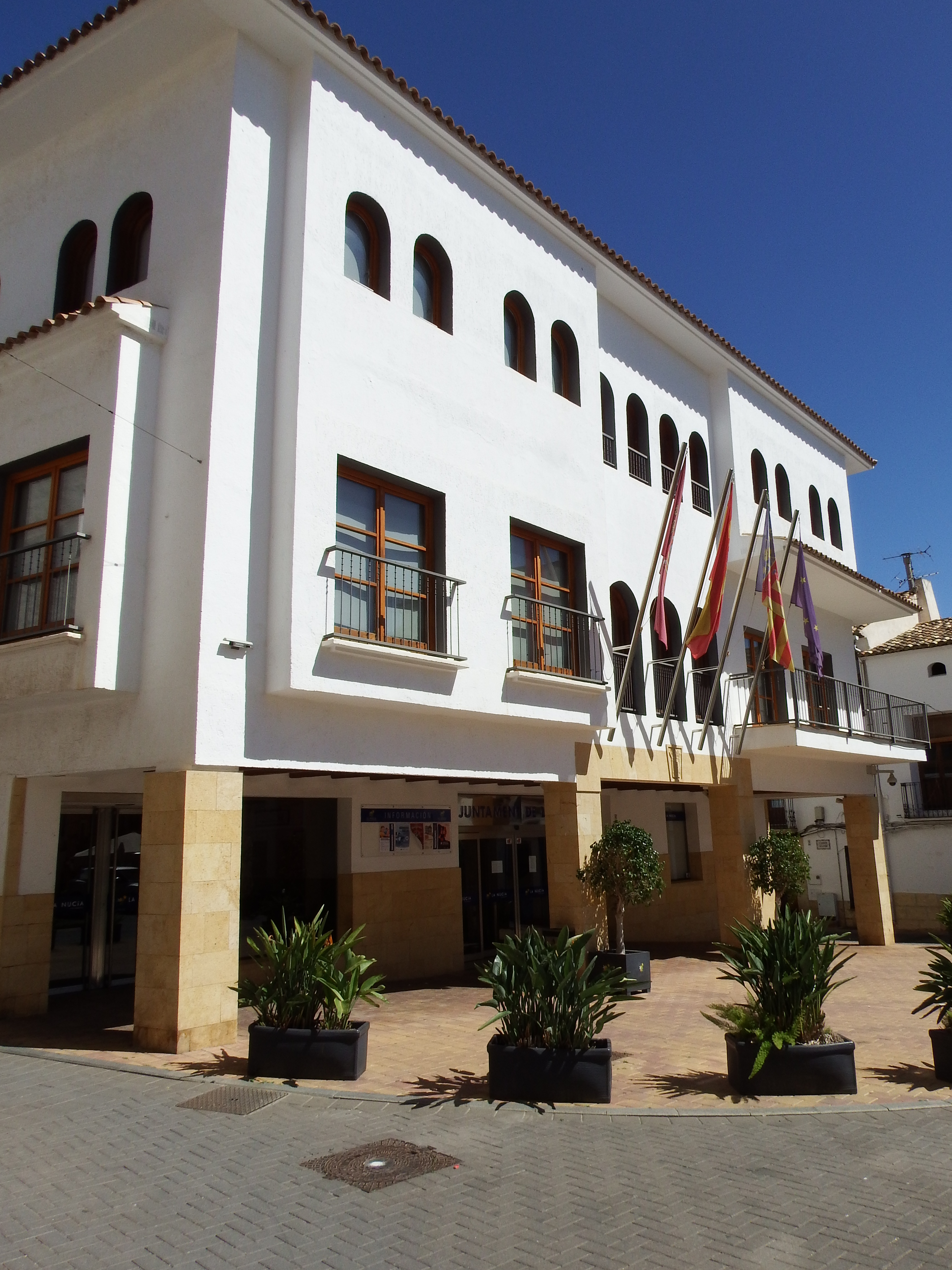
- Town hall

- Flag Coat of arms

- Location in Spain
- Coordinates: 38°37′2″N 0°7′23″W
- Country: Spain
- Autonomous community: Valencian Community
- Province: Alicante
- Comarca: Marina Baixa
- Independence: 1715

Government
  - Alcalde: Bernabé Cano García (PP)

Area
  - Total: 21.36 km^{2} (8.25 sq mi)
- Elevation: 226 m (741 ft)

Population (2025-01-01)
  - Total: 19,121
  - Official language(s): Valencian; Spanish
- Demonym(s): nucier, -a (Val.) nuciero, -a (Sp.)
- Website: http://www.lanucia.es/

La Nucia (Valencian: [la nuˈsi.a]; Spanish: La Nucía [la nuˈθi.a]) is a municipality in the comarca of Marina Baixa, Alicante, Valencian Community, Spain. It borders the municipalities of Altea, Callosa d'en Sarrià, Benidorm, Polop and L'Alfàs del Pi.

La Nucia is located in a fruit valley between Benidorm and Callosa d'en Sarrià, 3 kilometres (1.9 mi) from the coast of Altea. The urban center is on a promontory overlooking the Mediterranean Sea, 51 kilometres (32 mi) north of Alicante and 8 kilometres (5 mi) north of Benidorm.

The municipality includes the following housing estates: Barranco Hondo, Coloma, Bello Horizonte, Panorama, and El Tossal.

== Ethymology ==
The toponym of La Nucía has Andalusian Arabic origins. The traditional and most widely accepted theory suggests that the name derives from the Arabic word Naziha (or Nuzeiha), meaning "delicious", "pleasant", or "place of recreation".

However, recent philological research proposes a more specific evolution. According to historian and philologist Abel Soler, the town's name stems from the Arabic root Nazaá (referring to a lush, well-watered place with irrigation ditches), which evolved into the diminutive form Alnuzeia. Following the expulsion of the Moriscos in 1609, phonetic adaptations by Christian settlers eventually transformed the term into the current name, "La Nucía".

== History ==
Originally an alquería (Islamic agricultural settlement), the territory was conquered by the Christians and donated by King James I of Aragon to Beltrán de Bellpuig in 1271.

At the beginning of the 17th century, the demographic landscape of the area was severely impacted by the expulsion of the Moriscos in 1609. During this period, La Nucía formed part of the Barony of Polop and belonged to Alfonso Fajardo, Baron of Polop, who was tied to the noble house of the Marquis of los Vélez.

After a process of repopulation and demographic recovery, La Nucía officially became an independent municipality on July 9, 1705, when it split from the Barony of Polop. Following its new independent status, the parish church dedicated to La Inmaculada Concepción (Immaculate Conception) was constructed throughout the 18th century to serve the growing population.

== Sport ==
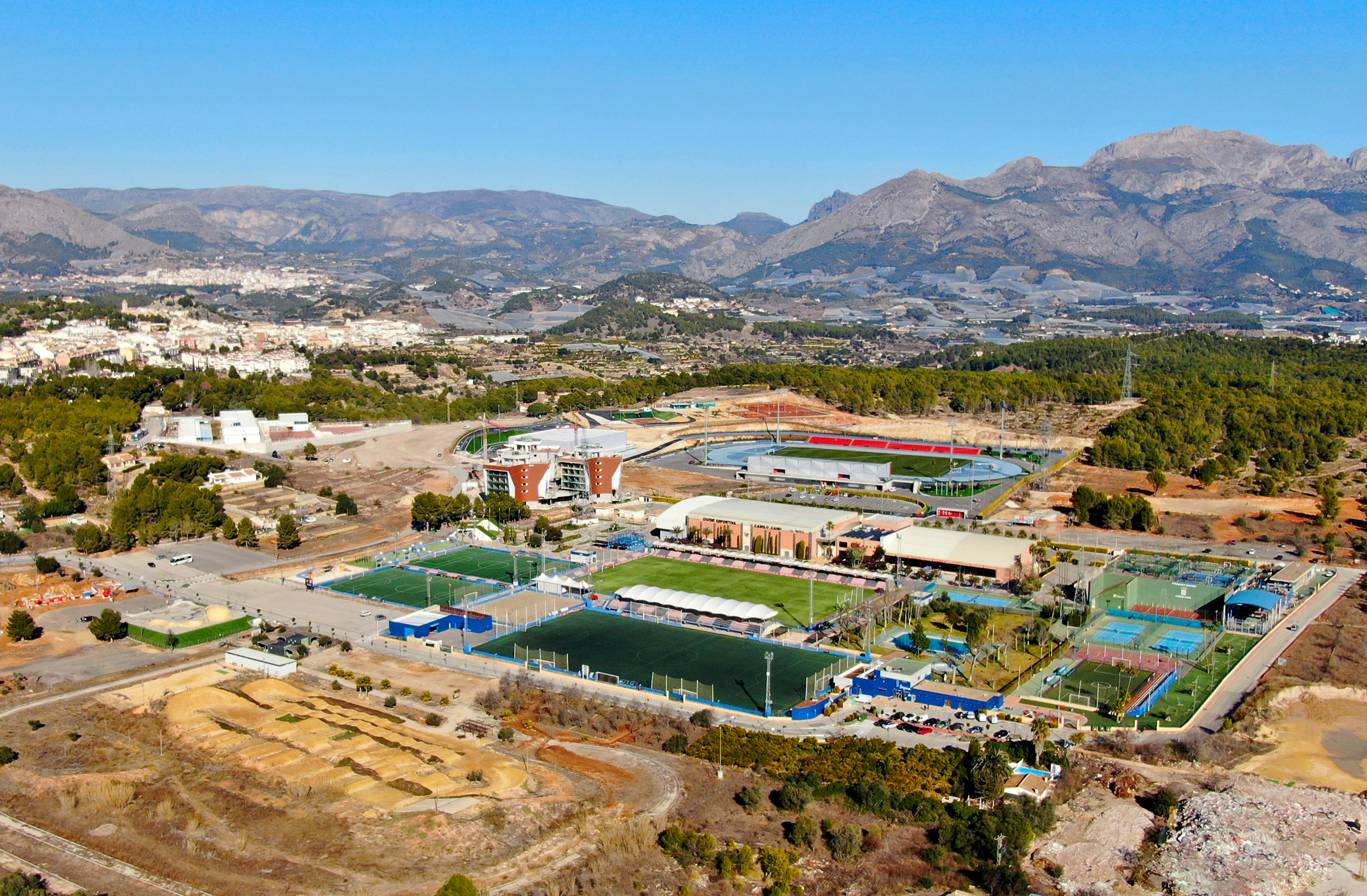
Camilo Cano Sports City

The sports infrastructure of La Nucía is centralized in the Camilo Cano Sports City (''Ciudad Deportiva Camilo Cano''), a complex spanning over 250,000 square meters. The facilities are equipped for various professional and amateur sports, including athletics (at the Camilo Cano Olympic Stadium), football, volleyball, swimming, martial arts, and gymnastics. Additionally, the complex features specialized venues such as padel courts, the Ferrer Tennis Academy founded by tennis player David Ferrer, and areas dedicated to urban sports like BMX tracks and a skatepark. In recognition of its sports infrastructure, the municipality was awarded the 2012 National Sports Award by the Spanish Higher Sports Council and has been designated as a "European City of Sport" on multiple occasions by ACES Europe.

=== Football ===
CF La Nucía is based at Estadi Olímpic Camilo Cano in the municipality.

=== Basketball ===
In 2026, La Nucía was designated as the first location for the NBA Basketball School in Spain. The project is integrated into the Camilo Cano Sports City and includes the construction of a pavilion dedicated exclusively to basketball. Additionally, the academy operates in collaboration with local educational institutions to provide bilingual academic instruction and boarding facilities for the players.
