= Alcalá del Júcar Castle =

Albacete, Spain castle

Coordinates: 39.1911°N 1.4299°W

The castle of Alcalá del Júcar is of Almohad origin (12th and 13th centuries), located in the town of Alcalá del Júcar, in the province of Albacete, Spain, above the gorge of the Júcar river.

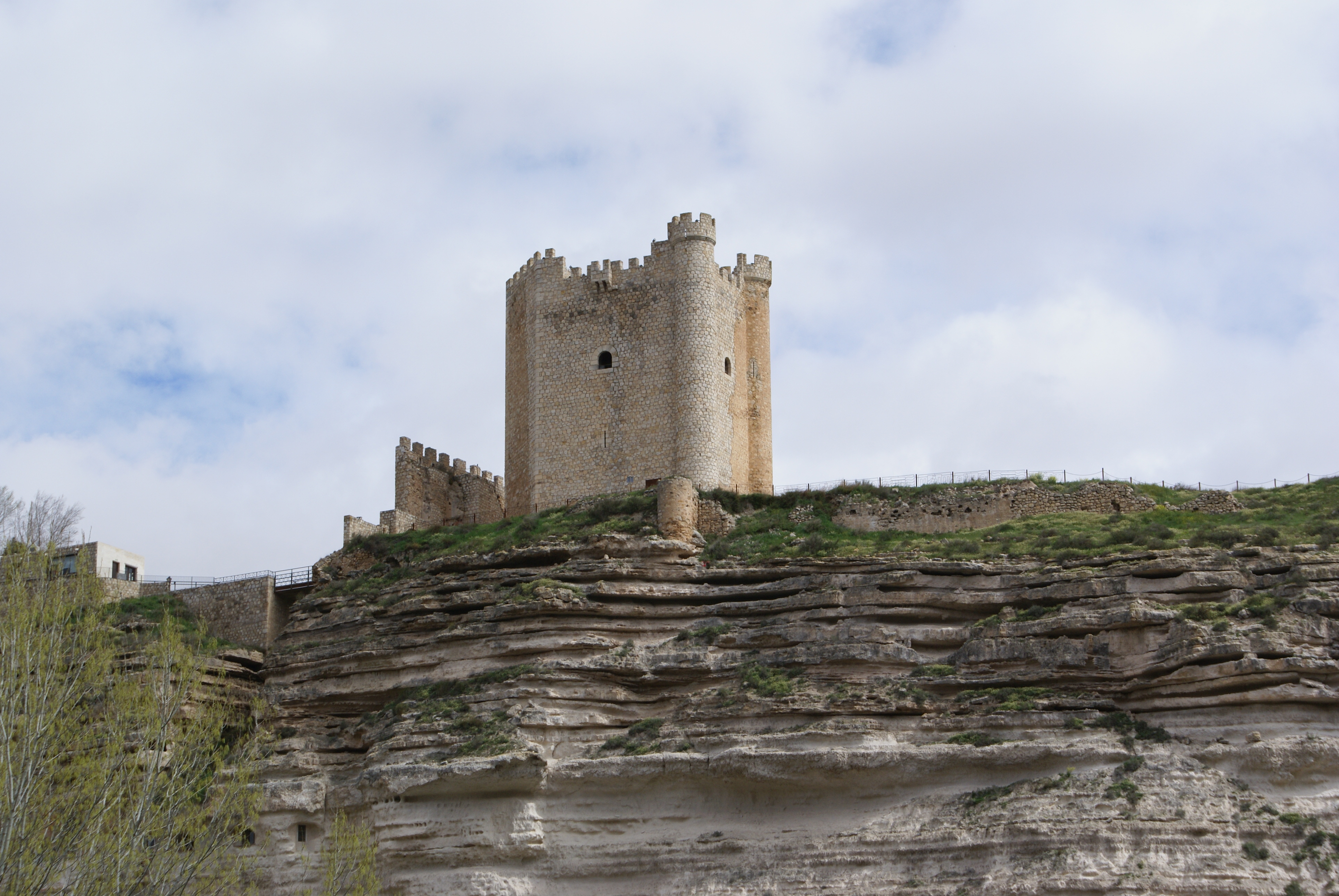
Castle of Alcalá del Júcar, Albacete, Spain

== History ==
Castle of Almohad origin (12th and 13th centuries). It was, as other castles and lands in this area, occupied by Iberians, Romans, Berbers and Christians.

When Alfonso VIII of Castile conquered this land around the year 1213, the castle was occupied by Christians. Later in time, it belonged to Marquis of Villena.

== Style ==
Its style is Islamic. There are three floors and has a pentagonal fortified tower and two circular little towers. Most of the wall that surrounded the castle have been destroyed over time, but some remains are still visible.

== Legend ==
Around the castle there is the popular legend of Princess Zulema and intense and tragic love with the Moor who lived Garadar. One version says that the princess was claimed by Garad Christian, who held the Castle to make him renounce his faith and marry her. To escape his fate, committed suicide by throwing himself Zulema vacuum. The other legend tells of forbidden love of Zulema, this time a Muslim, a Christian gentleman. To escape the wrath of his parents settled in the present location of the nearby village called Zulema.

== Current situation ==
- The castle is open to tourists.
- Declared a Historic-Artistic Site in 1982, was formerly Alcalá Jucar customs of the Camino Real de Castilla to the East.
- In 1986, it received the third prize, after the Eiffel Tower and the Grand Mosque in Istanbul, Best artistic lighting, organized by the Philips home according to the project by José Ángel Lucas Baidez.
- In 1994, the project Workshop II School Júcar Alcalá, was conditioned natural environment, improving its input.

== Surroundings ==
The castle is near some other places of touristic interest such as Jorquera and Villa de Ves.
