= Pablo Delgado (triple jumper) =

Spanish triple jumper (born 2003)

Personal information
- Born: 2 January 2003 (age 23)

Sport
- Sport: Athletics
- Event: Triple jump

Achievements and titles
- Personal best(s): Triple jump: 16.55m (2025); Long jump 7.75m (2025)
Medal record
Men's athletics
Representing Spain
European U23 Championships
Gold medal – first place	2025 Bergen	Triple jump

Pablo Delgado (born 2 January 2003) is a Spanish triple jumper. He won the gold medal at the 2025 European Athletics U23 Championships.

== Career ==
He is coached by experienced trainer Ramón Torralbo. In October 2020, he jumped 14.79 metres to win the triple jump at the Spanish Under-18 Championships in Tarragona.

He won the Spanish U23 national title in July 2023 with a jump of 16.01 metres in Tarragona. He competed in the 2023 European Athletics U23 Championships where he had a twelfth-place finish in Espoo, Finland, having jumped 15.58 metres to qualify for the final.

He jumped 15.84 meters to place third at the senior Spanish Athletics Championships in La Nucia in June 2024.

He won the Spanish under-23 national title in Badajoz in July 2025, with a personal best jump of 16.32 meters. The folllwing week, he won the gold medal at the 2025 European Athletics U23 Championships in Bergen, Norway with a new personal best jump of 16.55 metres. In doing so, he became not only the first Spaniard to win the event at the championships, but the first to win a medal.

== Personal life ==
From Cantabria, he studies for a Physical Activity and Sports Sciences degree at European University of the Atlantic in Santander, Spain.
