= Polop =

Municipality in Spain

Coordinates: 38.622°N 0.127°W

- Polop de la Marina
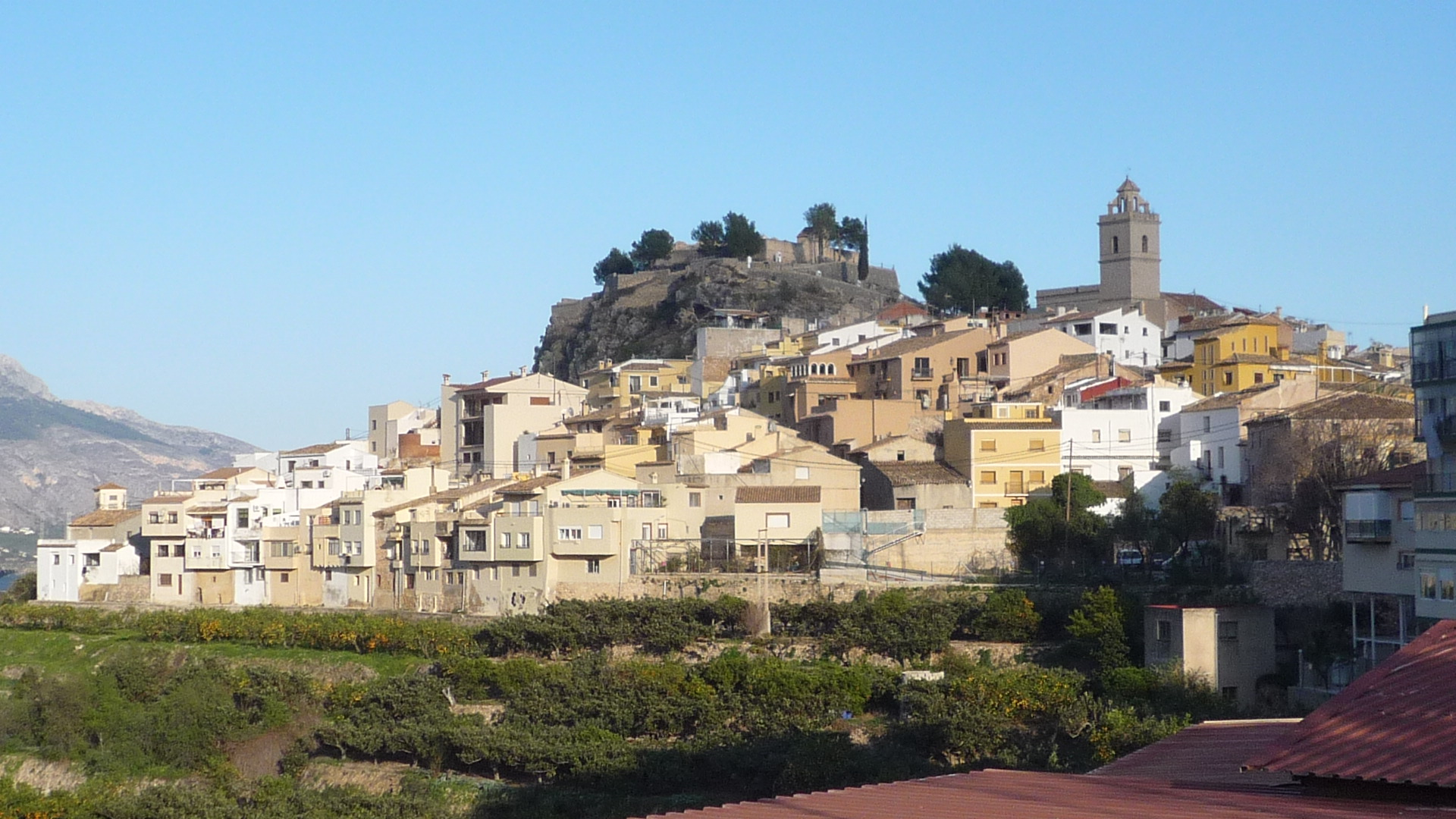
- The castle, church and old town of Polop

- Coat of arms

- Location within Province of Alicante Location within Valencian Community Location within Spain
- Country: Spain
- Autonomous community: Valencian Community
- Province: Alicante
- Comarca: Marina Baixa
- Feudal manor: 1290 CE

Government
  - Alcalde (Mayor): José Luis Susmozas Ferris (2023) (Partido Popular)

Area
  - Total: 22.58 km^{2} (8.72 sq mi)
- Elevation (AMSL): 262 m (860 ft)

Population (2025)
  - Total: 5,828
  - Density: 258.1/km^{2} (668.5/sq mi)
  - Linguistic area: Valencian
- Demonym(s): • polopí, -ina (Val.) • polopino/a (Sp.)
- Postal code: 03520
- Website: Official website

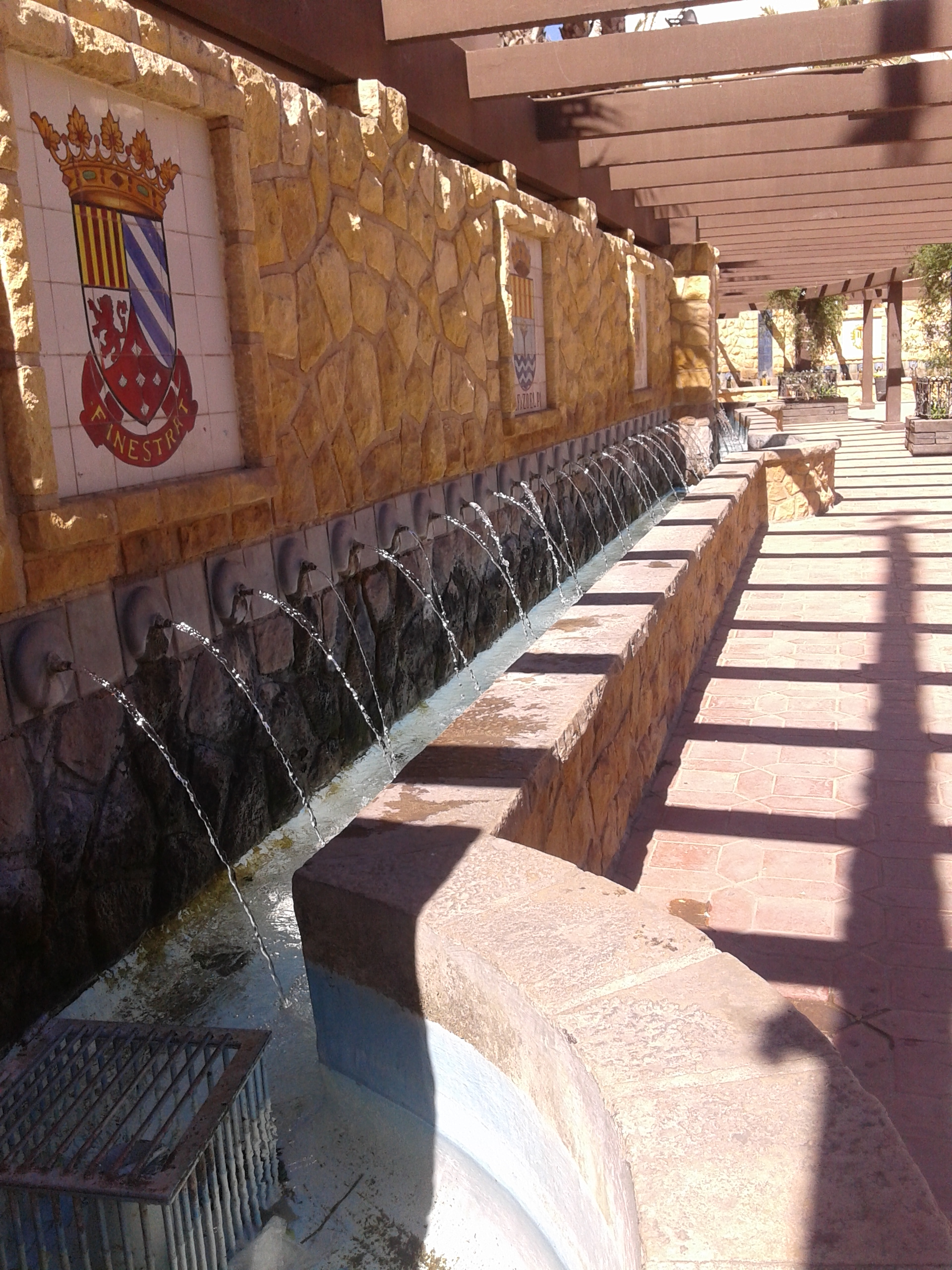
Fountain spouts in Polop

Polop de la Marina (Valencian pronunciation: [poˈlob de la maˈɾina]), or briefly Polop, is a municipality in the comarca of Marina Baixa, Alicante, Valencian Community, Spain.

== History ==
=== Antiquity and the Moorish Era ===
The origins of settlement in the Polop area date back to the Iberian culture around the 5th and 4th centuries BC. The territory later saw a Roman presence, taking advantage of its fertile lands for agriculture. However, the foundation of the modern settlement dates back to the muslim conquest of Iberian Peninsula, who built a fortress named Polop in the 10th century. In the 11th century, as related in the Historia Roderici, the Castilian nobleman Don Rodrigo Díaz de Vivar, better known as El Cid Campeador, occupied Polop castle in 1089–1090 before his conquest of the city of Valencia in 1094.

=== The Christian Conquest and the Barony of Polop ===
Following his conquest of the Kingdom of Valencia, King James I of Aragon initially offered Polop castle to the Muslim leader Mohammad Abu Abdallah Ben Hudzail al Sahuir, better known as Al-Azraq, until 1258 when the latter was defeated after a failed attempt against the monarch's life.

In the 13th century, Polop became a feudal barony under the Charter of Sobrarbe. The Barony of Polop and Benidorm was an ancient Spanish hereditary lordship in the Kingdom of Valencia under the Crown of Aragon. In 1268, King James I granted the barony to his distant cousin, Berenguela Alfonso. Upon her death without issue, it returned to the Crown. In 1271, the King revived it for the knight Don Beltran de Bellpuig and later for Admiral Don Bernat de Sarrià.

During most of the 14th century, the infantes of Aragon administered the lordship. Polop castle remained a highly strategic stronghold to defend against uprisings. On December 17, 1430, King John II of Aragon bestowed the barony upon his Chamberlain, Don Rodrigo Díaz de Mendoza. From the 15th century onwards, the lordship passed through multiple generations of the Fajardo de Mendoza family and their heirs.

=== The Moriscos Expulsion and Modern Era ===
In 1520, during the Revolt of the Brotherhoods (Revolta de les Germanies), the local Moriscos (Muslims who had converted to Christianity) sought refuge in the castle of Polop but suffered massive casualties at the hands of the insurgents. A century later, the Decree of Expulsion of the Moriscos in 1609 had a devastating demographic impact on Polop; the municipality lost over two-thirds of its population, leaving a significant void that severely affected its agricultural economy for decades.

Following the abolition of the feudal system in the 19th century, specifically the Abolition of Feudal Tenure Act of 1820, the Barony of Polop lost its legal and jurisdictional powers, transitioning into an honorary title and preserving its attached property rights.

In the early 20th century, Polop's tranquil environment, traditional agriculture, and abundant mountain springs began attracting renowned intellectuals and artists. In 1921, the Spanish modernist writer Gabriel Miró began spending his summers in the town, during which time he wrote some of his most celebrated works, including Años y leguas (1928). Other notable residents included the musician Óscar Esplá and the painter Benjamín Palencia.

== Culture ==
=== Architectural heritage ===
- The Castle of Polop: Located at the highest point of the town, this 12th-century fortress of Moorish origin was highly strategic during the Middle Ages. In the 19th century, its ruins were repurposed into a unique municipal cemetery, accessible via a winding Vía Crucis path. Though the cemetery was later relocated, the hilltop remains a major viewpoint offering panoramic views of the valley and the Mediterranean Sea.
- The Fountains of Polop (Font dels Xorrets): Built in the central square in the mid-20th century, this iconic monument consists of 221 water spouts. Each spout is decorated with the ceramic coat of arms of a different municipality in the Alicante province, the Valencian Community, and other Spanish regions. The spring water is historically famous for its purity and continues to attract visitors.
- Church of San Pedro: Constructed in 1723, this Catholic church is located near the base of the castle hill. Next to it stands the Sanctuary of the Divine Aurora, which houses the town's patroness.

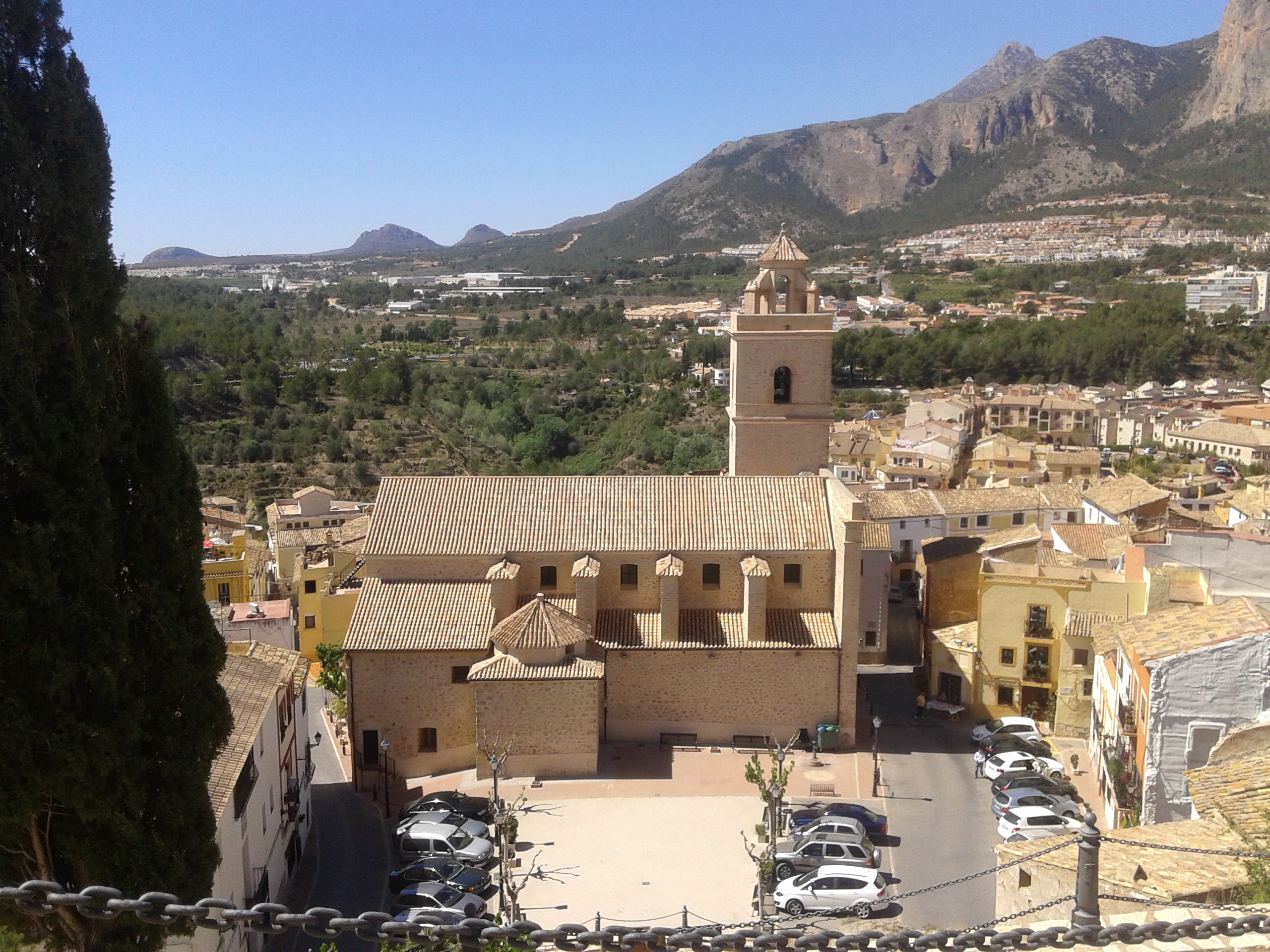
San Pedro Church and the Divina Aurora Shrine

=== Festivals and Traditions ===
- Patronal Festivities: Held in mid-August, these are the town's most important celebrations, dedicated to Saint Roch (Sant Roc), the Virgin of the Assumption, and the Divine Aurora. The week-long events include religious processions, floral offerings, street parades, live music, fireworks, and the traditional bous al carrer (bull running events).
- Festes del Porrat: Celebrated in early October in honor of Saint Francis of Assisi, this traditional autumn fair features cultural activities, artisanal markets, and community gatherings.
- Bonfires of Saint John: Like many towns in the Valencian Community, Polop celebrates the summer solstice with bonfires, music, and traditional dancing.

The town's annual jazz festival, originally known as JazzPolop until 2024, is an open-air music and arts event held in the historic center. Founded by local musician Papik Ribera, it ran under its original name for 13 editions, focusing on contemporary jazz and funk, poetry jam sessions, art exhibitions and vintage markets. Following the departure of its founder, the local municipality took over the organization, renaming it Polop FestiJazz.

=== Gastronomy ===
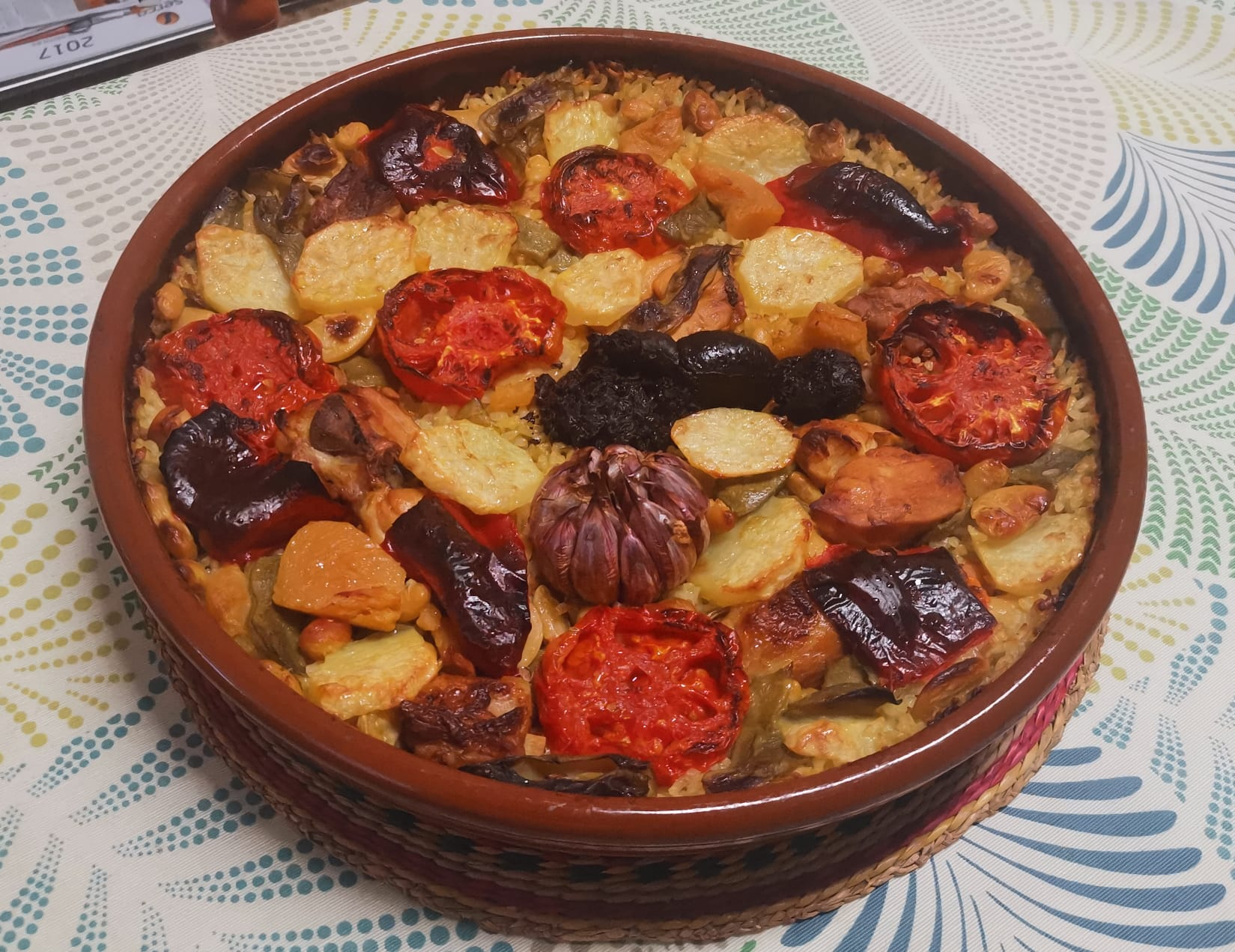
Arròs al forn in a terracotta dish

The local cuisine of Polop is typical of the mountainous inland Marina Baixa region, blending Mediterranean ingredients with hearty recipes designed for agricultural workers. Rice is a staple, with the most famous local dish being arròs amb fesols i naps (a soupy rice stew made with pork, white beans, and turnips). Other notable dishes include:

- Pilotes de dacsa: Traditional meatballs made from ground meats, cornmeal, and local spices, often cooked in a rich broth.
- Minxos: Traditional savory flatbreads or turnovers stuffed with regional vegetables, Swiss chard, and sometimes salted fish.
- Arròs al forn: A baked rice dish cooked in a clay pot with pork ribs, morcilla (blood sausage), chickpeas, and garlic.
- Espencat

Polop is surrounded by almond and loquat (níspero) orchards. Local bakeries specialize in traditional sweets such as pastissets de moniato (sweet potato pastries) and almond-based cakes, often accompanied by local honey.
