= Spanish feudal barony =

Manors in Andalusia in the 18th century. Pink - Royal lands, Green - Lands of nobility, Yellow - Land of military orders

A Spanish feudal barony was a form of Feudal land tenure in the Kingdoms of Aragon and Valencia, namely per baroniam (Latin for "by barony") under which the land-holder owed the service of being one of the king's barons.

== Abolition ==
Feudal lordships were abolished by Spanish Constitution of 1812, following the end of the Antiguo Regimen. The Abolition of Feudal Tenure (Spain) Act 1820 (Ley de Desvinculaciones de 1820) simply took away the legal and juridical rights pertaining to these lordships but preserved the property rights attached to them and the dignity of their honours including the right to use the feudal title and the coat of arms. In the present days, despite having no political power as such, lordships, like titles of nobility, simply remain rights held as prerogative of honour.

== List of Spanish feudal baronies ==
- Barony of Polop

== Bibliography ==
- VALDEÓN, Julio, SALRACH, José María y ZABALO, Javier (1987). Feudalismo y consolidación de los pueblos hispánicos. Barcelona: Labor. ISBN 84-335-9424-9.
- Bibliografía sobre señoríos y feudalismo
