= Villatoya =

Municipality of Spain

Coordinates: 39°20′N 1°18′W

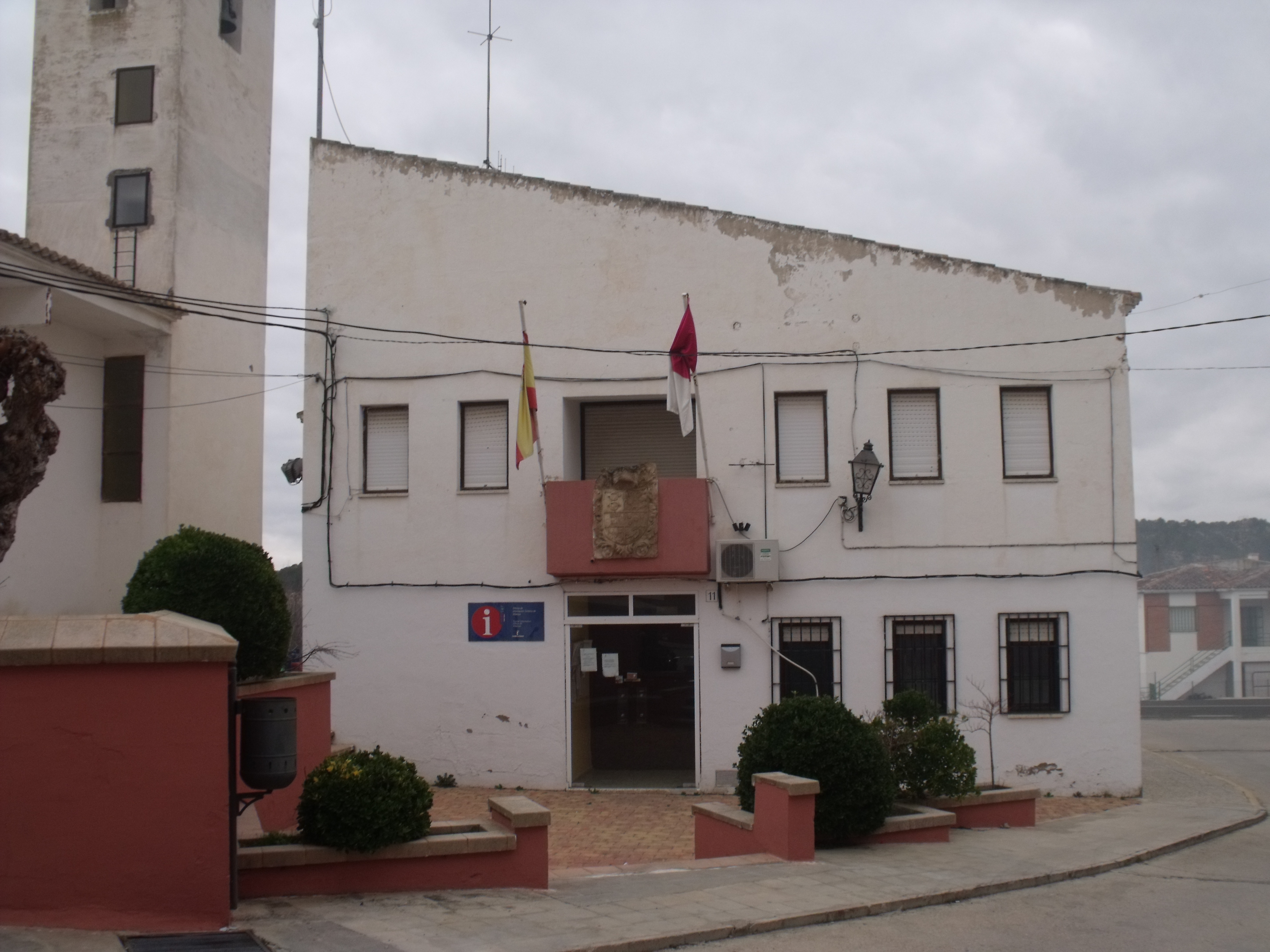
Town hall

Coat of arms of Villatoya

Villatoya is a municipality in Albacete, Castile-La Mancha, Spain. It has a population of 186.
