= 2025 European Athletics U23 Championships – Men's triple jump =

Men's triple jump at the 2025 European Athletics U23 Championships
- Venue: Fana Stadion
- Location: Bergen, Norway
- Dates: 19 July (qualification); 20 July (final)
- Competitors: 20 from 16 nations
- Winning distance: 16.55 m PB

Medalists
gold medal	Pablo Delgado	Spain
silver medal	Lâchezar Vâlchev	Bulgaria
bronze medal	Federico Lorenzo Bruno	Italy

The men's triple jump event at the 2025 European Athletics U23 Championships was held in Bergen, Norway, at Fana Stadion on 19 and 20 July.

== Records ==
Prior to the competition, the records were as follows:

Record	Athlete (nation)	Distance (m)	Location	Date
European U23 record	Teddy Tamgho (FRA)	17.98 m	New York City, United States	12 June 2010
Championship U23 record	Şeref Osmanoğlu (UKR)	17.72 m	Ostrava, Czech Republic	17 July 2011

== Results ==
=== Qualification ===
All athletes over 16.00 m (Q) or at least the 12 best performers (q) advance to the final.

==== Group A ====
Place	Athlete	Nation	#1	#2	#3	Result	Notes
1	Razvan-Ioan Nicoară	Romania	x	x	16.08 (+2.2 m/s)	16.08 m (+2.2 m/s)	Q
2	Lâchezar Vâlchev	Bulgaria	15.95 (+2.4 m/s)	x	r	15.95 m (+2.4 m/s)	q
3	Mesut Bülbül	Turkey	15.54 (+1.9 m/s)	15.91 (+2.5 m/s)	x	15.91 m (+2.5 m/s)	q
4	Federico Lorenzo Bruno	Italy	15.90 (+1.3 m/s)	-	15.68 (+2.2 m/s)	15.90 m (+1.3 m/s)	q, SB
5	Federico Morseletto	Italy	15.81 (+1.1 m/s)	15.24 (+0.3 m/s)	x	15.81 m (+1.1 m/s)	q
6	Nikola Ilić	Serbia	x	15.30 (+2.2 m/s)	15.52 (+0.5 m/s)	15.52 m (+0.5 m/s)	q
7	Georgios Grepsios	Greece	x	15.44 (+1.7 m/s)	x	15.44 m (+1.7 m/s)	
8	Viktor Morozov	Estonia	14.99 (+2.7 m/s)	15.28 (+2.3 m/s)	15.21 (+1.6 m/s)	15.28 m (+2.3 m/s)	
9	Joshua Bozic	Croatia	x	15.09 (+2.0 m/s)	15.10 (+1.8 m/s)	15.10 m (+1.8 m/s)	
10	Matúš Blšták	Slovakia	15.02 (+1.5 m/s)	x	r	15.02 m (+1.5 m/s)	

==== Group B ====
Place	Athlete	Nation	#1	#2	#3	Result	Notes
1	Tiago Pereira	Portugal	15.10 (+1.3 m/s)	15.26 (+1.6 m/s)	16.05 (+1.3 m/s)	16.05 m (+1.3 m/s)	Q
2	Pablo Delgado	Spain	x	15.25 (+2.0 m/s)	15.91 (+1.5 m/s)	15.91 m (+1.5 m/s)	q
3	Grigoris Nikolaou	Cyprus	14.96 (+1.5 m/s)	15.87 (±0.0 m/s)	15.87 (+0.9 m/s)	15.87 m (±0.0 m/s)	q, PB
4	Alex Fabbri	Italy	15.84 (+0.3 m/s)	x	-	15.84 m (+0.3 m/s)	q, SB
5	Steven Freund	Germany	15.58 (+1.7 m/s)	15.50 (+0.8 m/s)	x	15.58 m (+1.7 m/s)	q
6	Pavel Halátek	Czech Republic	14.75 (+1.2 m/s)	15.30 (+1.6 m/s)	15.46 (+1.6 m/s)	15.46 m (+1.6 m/s)	q
7	Jakub Bracki	Poland	x	x	15.11 (+2.2 m/s)	15.11 m (+2.2 m/s)	
8	Cristian Valentin Radu	Romania	14.84 (+1.9 m/s)	x	x	14.84 m (+1.9 m/s)	
—	Bozhidar Sarâboyukov	Bulgaria				DQ	TR 7.1
—	Gor Hovakimjan	Armenia				DQ	TR 7.1

=== Final ===
Place	Athlete	Nation	#1	#2	#3	#4	#5	#6	Result	Notes
1st place, gold medalist(s)	Pablo Delgado	Spain	16.55 (−0.3 m/s)	13.73 (−0.5 m/s)	15.65 (+1.2 m/s)	16.55 (+0.8 m/s)	15.81 (+1.0 m/s)	16.35 (+1.0 m/s)	16.55 m (+0.8 m/s)	PB
2nd place, silver medalist(s)	Lâchezar Vâlchev	Bulgaria	x	16.22 (+1.2 m/s)	16.48 (+1.8 m/s)	x	x	x	16.48 m (+1.8 m/s)	PB
3rd place, bronze medalist(s)	Federico Lorenzo Bruno	Italy	16.47 (+2.3 m/s)	16.24 (+1.0 m/s)	15.63 (−1.2 m/s)	16.13 (+0.4 m/s)	x	15.60 (+0.5 m/s)	16.47 m (+2.3 m/s)	
4	Alex Fabbri	Italy	16.20 (+2.3 m/s)	16.39 m (+2.9 m/s)	x	15.74 (+0.8 m/s)	15.78 (−0.5 m/s)	x	16.39 m (+2.9 m/s)	
5	Grigoris Nikolaou	Cyprus	15.69 (+0.1 m/s)	15.53 (−0.1 m/s)	15.85 (+1.4 m/s)	x	x	x	15.85 m (+1.4 m/s)	
6	Steven Freund	Germany	x	15.81 (+1.5 m/s)	x	15.24 (+0.5 m/s)	15.51 (+0.4 m/s)	15.17 (+2.1 m/s)	15.81 m (+1.5 m/s)	
7	Nikola Ilić	Serbia	15.20 (+0.1 m/s)	15.57 (+0.7 m/s)	15.64 (+1.3 m/s)				15.64 m (+1.3 m/s)	
8	Pavel Halátek	Czech Republic	15.19 (+0.7 m/s)	x	15.47 (+2.0 m/s)				15.47 m (+2.0 m/s)	
9	Mesut Bülbül	Turkey	15.13 (+0.6 m/s)	15.41 (±0.0 m/s)	15.29 (−1.5 m/s)				15.41 m (±0.0 m/s)	
10	Tiago Pereira	Portugal	14.83 (−1.1 m/s)	x	14.81 (±0.0 m/s)				14.83 m (−1.1 m/s)	
—	Federico Morseletto	Italy							DQ	TR 7.1
—	Razvan-Ioan Nicoară	Romania							DQ	TR 7.1
