= Villavaliente =

Municipality of Spain

Coordinates: 39°08′N 1°27′W

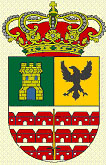
Villavaliente's coat of arms

Villavaliente is a municipality in Albacete, Castile-La Mancha, Spain. It has a population of 279.

== Gallery ==
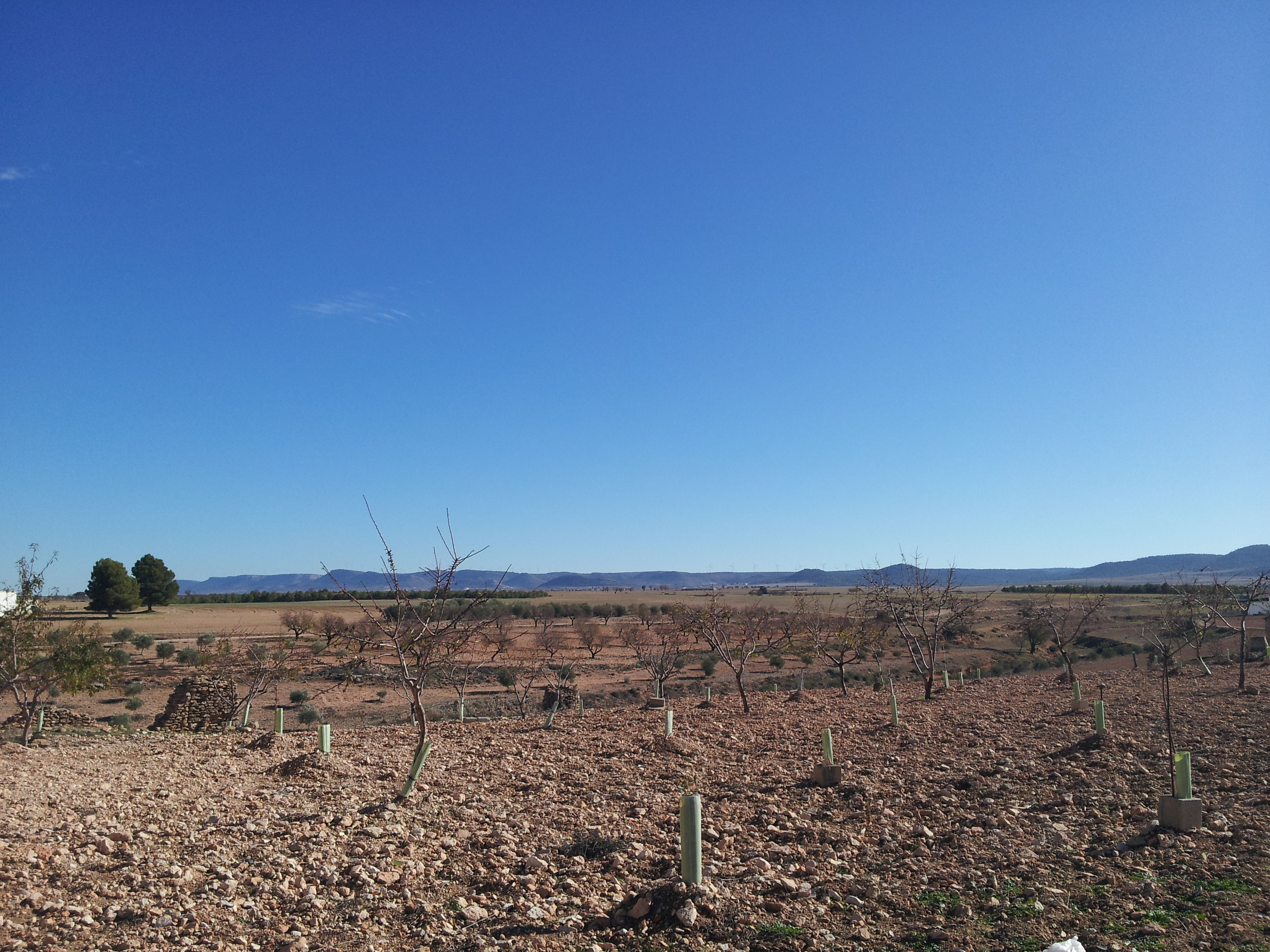

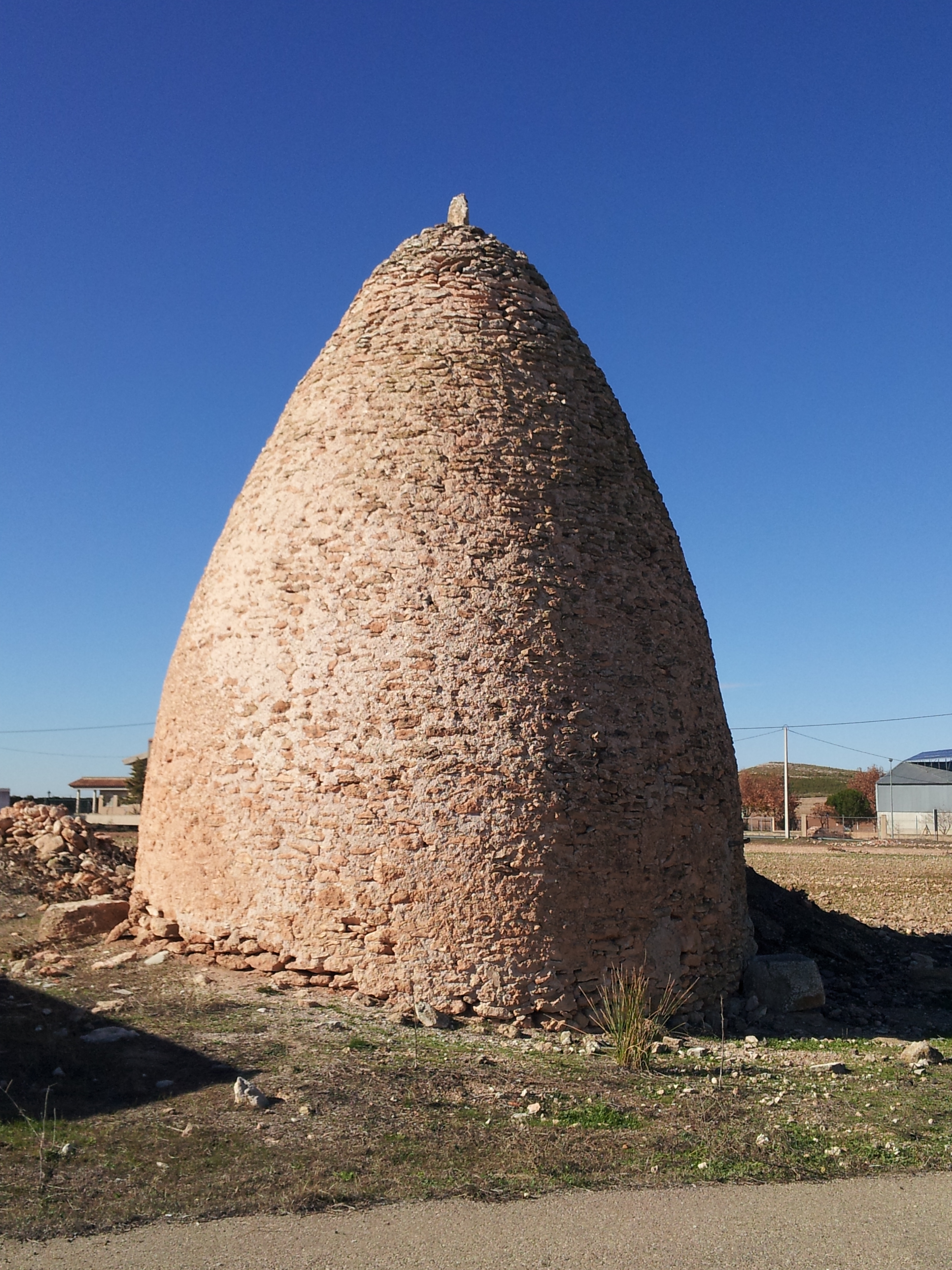

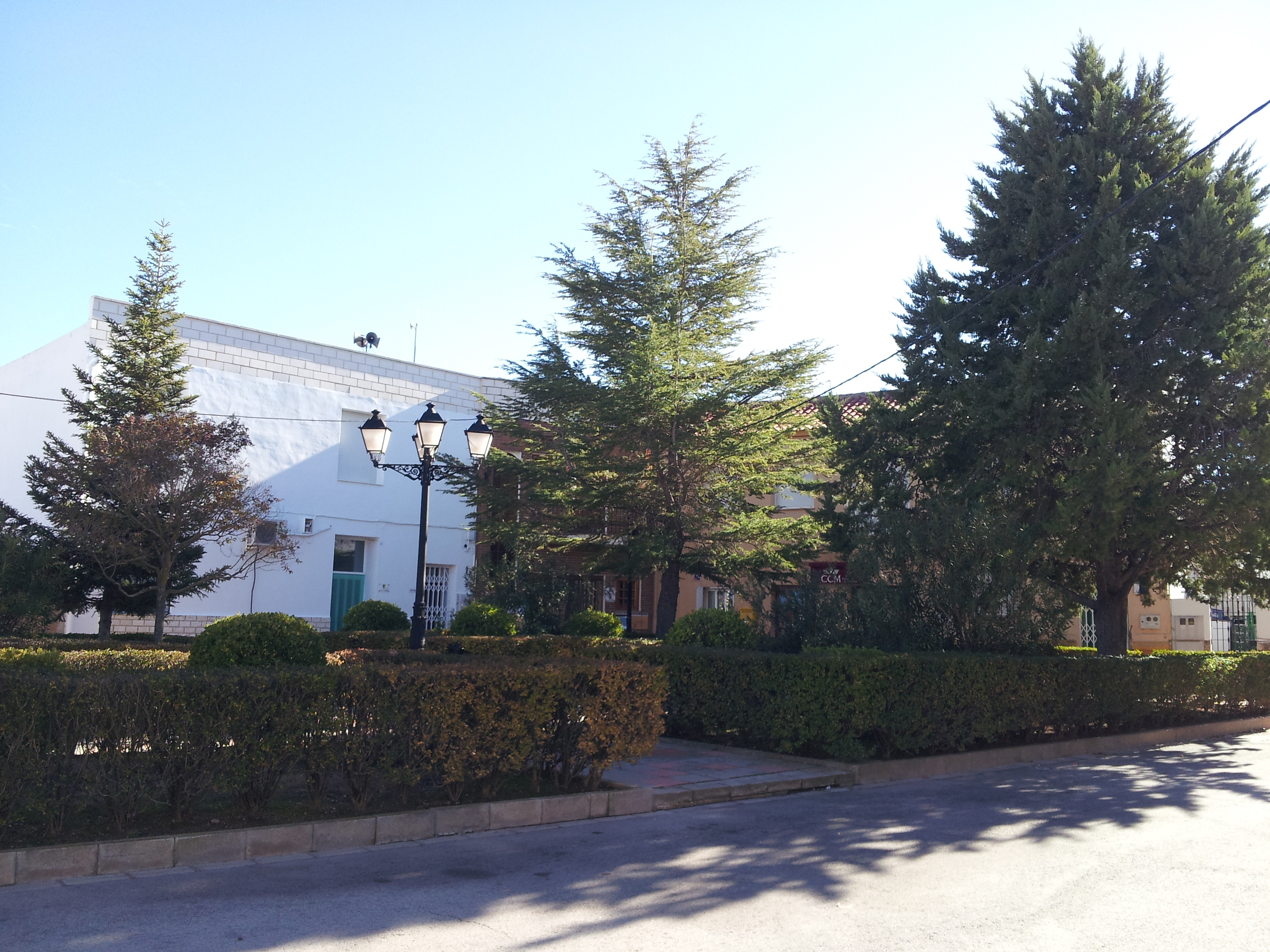

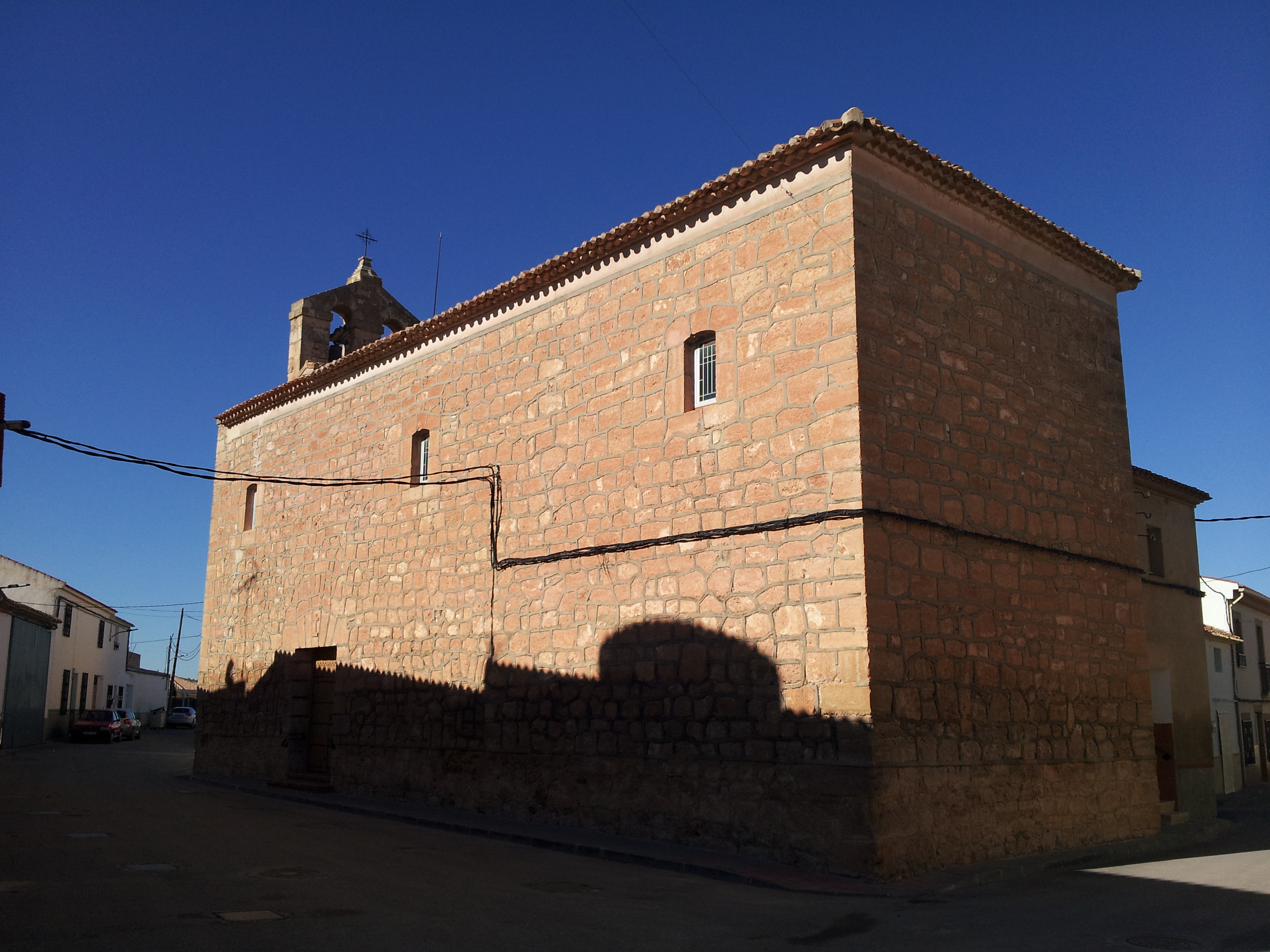

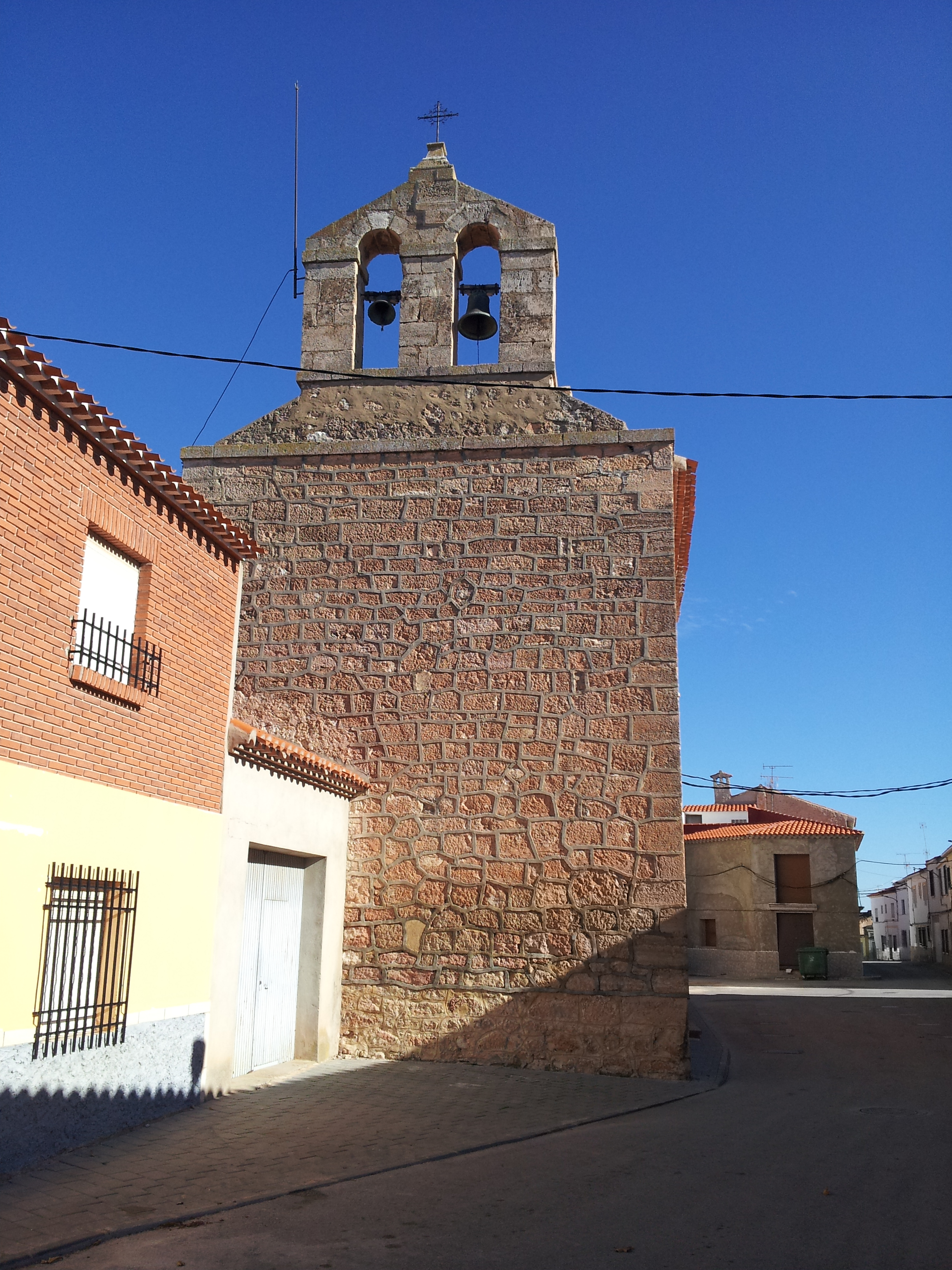

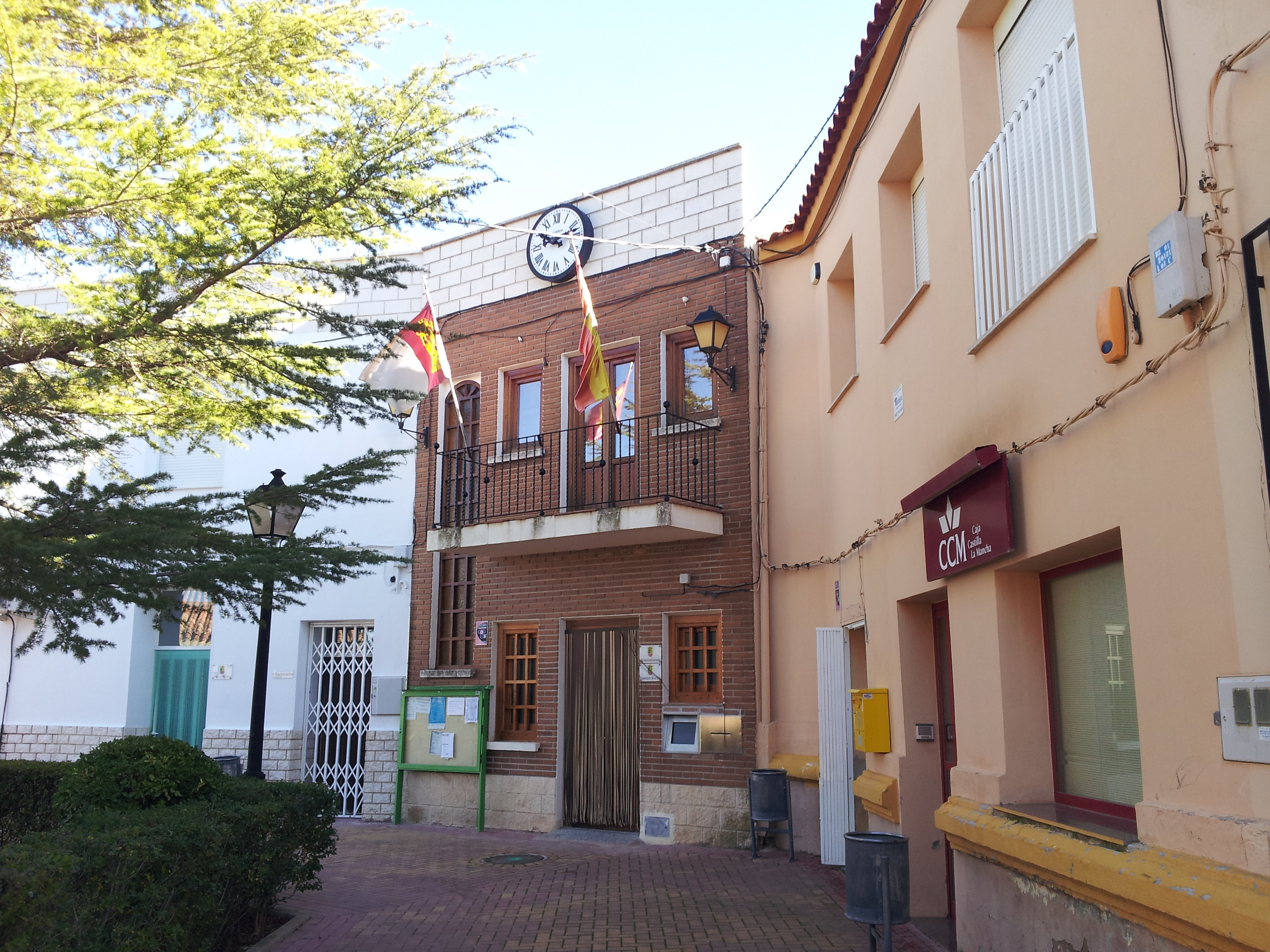

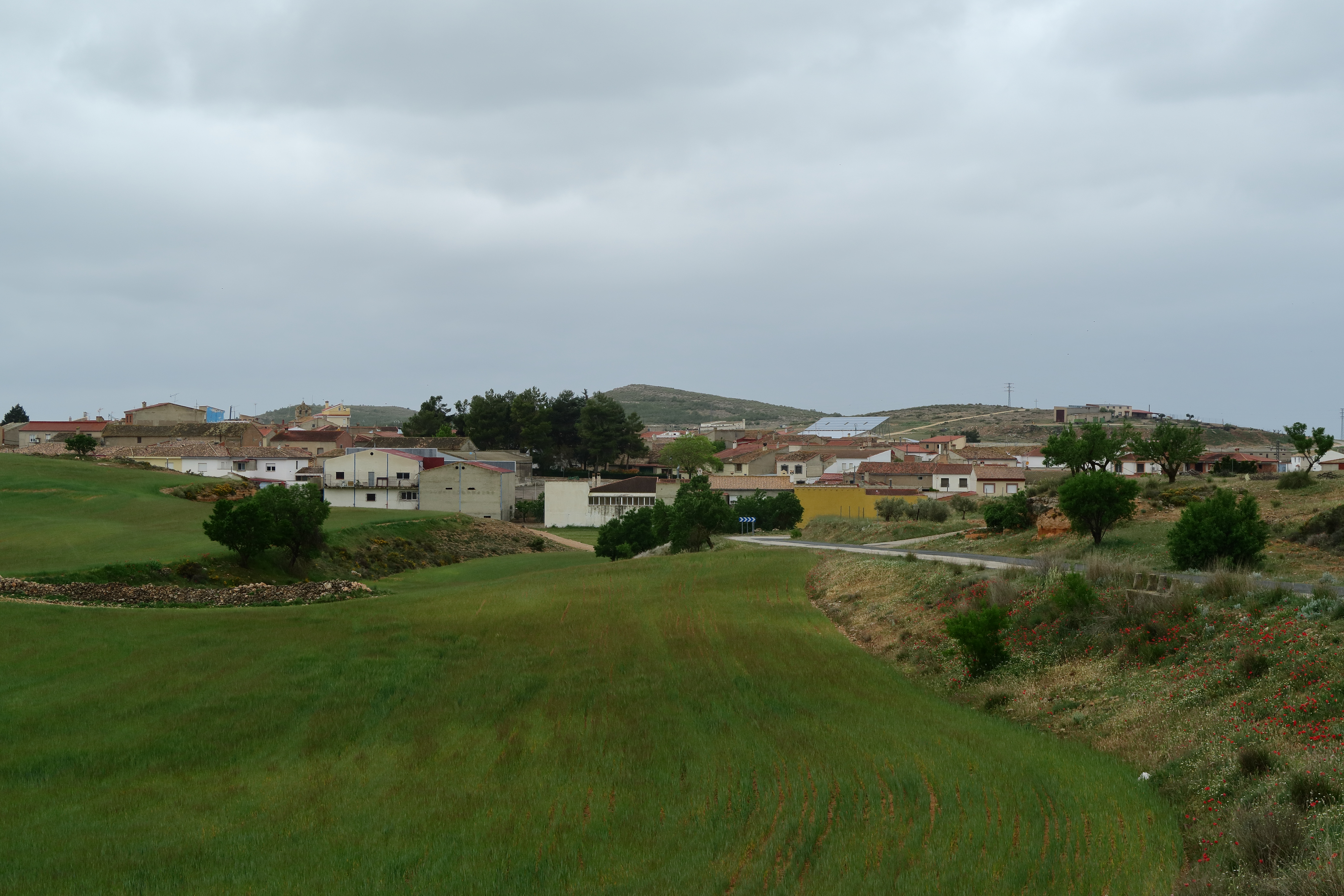
