= Benjamín Palencia =

Spanish painter

- Born: Benjamín Palencia Pérez; 7 July 1894; Barrax, Albacete, Spain
- Died: 16 January 1980 (aged 85); Madrid, Madrid, Spain
- Education: Real Academia de Bellas Artes de San Fernando
- Known for: Painting and Drawing
- Movement: Surrealism, Fauvism
- Awards: 1943 First prize at the National Exhibition of Fine Arts (Spain); 1961 Gold medal of the Province of Albacete; 1970 Gold medal of the Province of Ávila

Benjamín Palencia (7 July 1894 − 16 January 1980) was a Spanish painter and draftsman from Barrax, Albacete.

He is regarded as playing a pivotal role in the revitalization of the arts in Spain during the 1920s and 1930s, and he was also a significant figure in Spanish postwar art.

Most notably in the early 1930's he became known as co-founder of the School of Vallecas, together with the sculptor Alberto Sánchez Pérez.

The quintessence of the large body of his work is perhaps the poetry of the Castilian landscape as defined by the Generation of '98.
