= Barony of Polop =

Coordinates: 38°37′20″N 0°07′38″W

Barony of Polop and Benidorm (in Spanish, Señorío de la Baronía de Polop y Benidorm or simply, Señorío de Polop y Benidorm)
- Creation date: 1268 (first creation); 1271 (second creation); 1300 (third creation); 1335 (fourth creation); 1429 (fifth creation); Ever since the fifth creation the barony has been possessed by the Fajardo de Mendoza family and its descendants
- Created by: King Jaume I of Aragon
- Peerage: Crown of Aragon
- First holder: Doña Berenguela Alfonso of Castile and León
- Present holder: Don Francisco de Borja de la Peña Fernández-Garnelo
- Remainder to: the 1st Baron's male (or female heirs since 1654) lawfully begotten
- Subsidiary titles: Lordship of La Raya, La Ñora, Ávalos and Ceutí
- Former seats: Polop Castle, Benidorm Castle
- Motto: Ave Maria Gratia Plena, Latin for "Hail Mary Full of Grace"

The Barony of Polop and Benidorm is an ancient Spanish hereditary lordship in the Kingdom of Valencia under the Crown of Aragon (in Spanish, baronía señorial aragonesa). The barony, including the castles of Polop and Benidorm and extensive land, is located in the province of Alicante, Valencia, Spain, only a few miles from the Mediterranean Sea.

After being possessed by the Crown of Aragon, in 1429 the barony was bestowed by King John II of Aragon, father of King Ferdinand of Spain the Catholic upon the Fajardo de Mendoza family. The most notable Barons of Polop are the Infantes of Aragon and Doña Beatriz Fajardo de Mendoza y Guzmán, Lady of Albudeyte. Other people associated with the Barony include the Castilian nobleman Don Rodrigo Díaz de Vivar, better known as El Cid Campeador.

== History ==
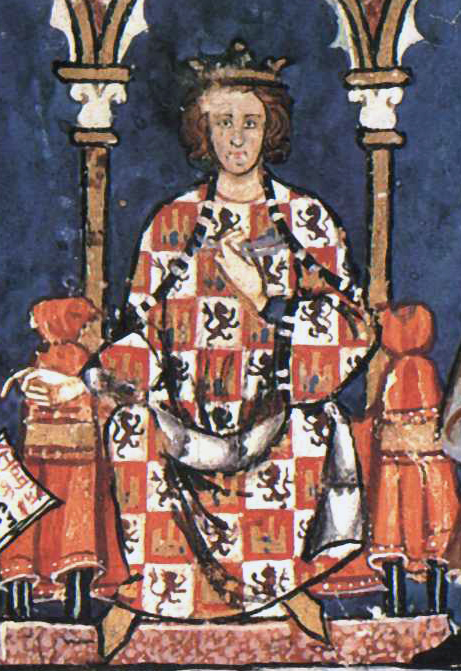
Portrait of Alfonso X

Its origins date back to the conquest of Hispania by the Moors who occupied the Iberian Peninsula in the 10th century, when a fortress was built and named Polop. In the 11th century, as it is related in the Historia Roderici ("History of Rodrigo"), El Cid Campeador occupied Polop Castle in 1089–1090 before conquering the city of Valencia in 1094. Following his conquest of the Kingdom of Valencia, King James I of Aragon offered Polop Castle to the Muslim leader Mohammad Abu Abdallah Ben Hudzail al Sahuir until 1258 when the latter was defeated during a failed attempt against the life of the monarch.

In the 13th century, Polop became a feudal barony under the Charter of Sobrarbe. In 1268 the barony was granted by King James I to his distant cousin, Berenguela Alfonso, who had become his concubine after his wife, Teresa Gil de Vidaure, allegedly developed leprosy, but returned to the Crown upon her death without issue. In 1271 the King revived it for the knight Don Beltran de Bellpuig and, upon his death without issue, for Admiral Don Bernat de Sarrià.

During most of the 14th century the infantes of Aragon administered the lordship and were styled as Barons of Polop. In those years, Polop Castle continued being a strategic place to prevent the invasion of the large Muslim population.

Since the 15th century until the present days, the lordship has passed by personal descent through several generations of the Fajardo de Mendoza family and its heirs. It was on 17 December 1430 when the Infante John II of Aragon, King of Navarre through his marriage to Queen Blanche I of Navarre, granted it to his Lord-in-Waiting and Chamberlain Don Rodrigo Díaz de Mendoza and his heirs. Such grant was confirmed by his brother King Alfonso V of Aragon by Royal Charter of 1437. In 1727 King Philip V of Spain issued a Royal Charter allowing baronies in the Crown of Aragon to become titles of nobility in their own right. For instance, the Barony of la Pobadilla and the Barony of Bellpuig made use of such privilege in 1728 and 1923 respectively.

Following the abolition of the feudal system in the 19th century, Polop, like other Spanish feudal baronies and lordships, became obsolete but never extinct. In particular, the Abolition of Feudal Tenure (Spain) Act 1820 (Ley de Desvinculaciones de 1820) simply took away the legal and juridical rights pertaining to these lordships but preserved the property rights attached to them and the dignity of their honours including the right to use the feudal title and the coat of arms. In the present days, despite having no political power as such, lordships, like titles of nobility, simply remain rights held as prerogative of honour.

== Jurisdiction ==
In the Low Middle Ages and until 1820, the Barony of Polop was a form of feudal land tenure according to the classic definition of feudalism, similar in some respects to the English feudal barony and the Scottish feudal lordship. It involved a set of reciprocal legal and military obligations among the warrior nobility. The baron was the nobleman who held the land or fief, including Benidorm, Chirles and La Nuncia, originally given by the king, and granted possession to the vassal in exchange for benefits, protection and other services. The Barons of Polop administered laws, waged war, established markets in towns, and maintained their own chanceries that kept their records. They also had their own deputies, or sheriffs and jurisdiction over all cases at laws sitting in their own courts. They could declare and wage war, establish boroughs, and grant extensive charters of liberties. They could confiscate the estates of traitors and felons, and regrant these at will. Finally, they could claim any and every feudal due, aid, grant, and relief. In contrast to titles of nobility in the Spanish peerage, no baronial relief was payable in order to lawfully take possession of the lordship.

The Barony of Polop is not to be confused with a manorial lordship in England and Wales. While manorial lordships can be sold, Polop, like other Spanish baronies, is hereditary in nature and under no circumstances can it be traded by the lineage family.

Those holding the lordship have held aristocratic rank and control over the land and been addressed and styled not only as lord but also as baron, as in the Crown of Aragon, lordships were called baronies, so namely, Lord of the Barony of Polop, Baron of Polop or simply Lord Polop (in Spanish, Señor de la Baronía de Polop, o shortly Barón de Polop or Señor de Polop).

== Order of succession ==
Polop, like most other lordships, was hereditary in nature. In the Low Middle Ages and until 1654, it was only allowed to pass down by inheritance through the male line under Royal Charter of 1448. When Don Diego Fajardo de Mendoza y Guzmán died in 1643 without a male heir and with a sole sister, the Royal Audience of Valencia had to administer the lordship for 11 years until by Royal Charter of 1654 King Philip IV of Spain allowed it to be passed to an heir of either gender. Since then and until the present days, the barony has continued to be held by members of the Fajardo de Mendoza family and his blood relatives in the direct line of descent. Unlike titles of nobility in the Spanish peerage, each new baron is not required to be confirmed in the lordship by Royal Charter issued and signed by the monarch.

As the Barons of Polop never made use of their right to let the lordship become a title of nobility under the Royal Charter of 1727 issued by King Philip V of Spain, Polop remains a feudal barony with aristocratic rank. Therefore, following the enactment of the Abolition of Feudal Tenure (Spain) Act 1820, its transmission from generation to generation is not subject to the current revival legal provisions for titles of nobility but rather to the provisions of the original grants in the light of the Spanish historic law and the current civil procedure rules. In the 21st century, the rights of the holder of the barony should be confirmed by the Spanish courts of justice.

== Armorial ==
Figure	Name and blazon
	Historic Coat of Arms of the Crown of Aragon
	Following the wishes of Don Luis Fajardo de Mendoza y López de Ayala in 1593, the Shield was divided vertically with one half Fajardo and the other half Mendoza
	In addition to the Lords of Polop, the family Fajardo included other prominent members such as Pedro Fajardo, Viceroy of Valencia, Navarre and Sicily, 5th Marquess of the Vélez and Grandee of Spain
	The unofficial Arms of the municipality of Polop de la Marina display the arms of the Crown of Aragon and those of the Fajardo de Mendoza family. The Spanish Royal Academy of History proposed a different shield in 1990 but which was never approved.

== The Barons of Polop and Benidorm ==
=== The first life holders in the Crown of Aragon ===
The lordship was first granted by King James I of Aragon to his cousin Berenguela Alfonso of Castile and León in 1268, and upon her death without issue, revived for the knight Beltrán de Bellpuig in 1271 and for Admiral Bernat de Sarrià in 1291.

	Holder	Period
I	Doña Berenguela Alfonso of Castile	1235 †1272
II	Don Beltran de Bellpuig, Baron of Castellmontant and Lord-Lieutenant to King James I	
III	Don Bernat de Sarrià, Admiral and nobleman in the service of King James II of Aragon	1266 †1335

=== The Infantes of Aragon as Royal Hereditary Barons of Polop ===
The Infantes of Aragon were styled as Barons of Polop during the Low Middle Ages until 1430.

	Holder	Period
I	Infante Don Pere of Aragon d'Anjou, Count of Ribagorça, Ampúries and Prades	1305 †1381
II	Infante Don Alfonso of Aragon Foix, Duke of Gandia and Count of Dénia and Ribagorça	1305 †1381
III	Infante Don Alfonso of Aragon Arenós, Duke of Gandia and Count of Dénia	1355 †1425

=== The Fajardo de Mendoza family as Hereditary Barons of Polop and Benidorm ===
In 1430 the Infante John II of Aragon, King of Navarre and Duke of Peñafiel and Montblanch, revived the lordship for his Lord-in-Waiting don Rodrigo Díaz de Mendoza, who died without male issue, and bequeathed it to his niece's husband Don Juan Alonso Fajardo and his heirs, the Fajardo de Mendoza family.

	Holder	Period
I	Don Rodrigo Díaz de Mendoza, Lord-in-Waiting to Infante John II of Aragon, King of Navarre	†1447
II	Don Juan Alonso Fajardo	
III	Don Diego Fajardo y Díaz de Mendoza	†1494
IV	Don Alonso Fajardo de Mendoza y Heredia	†1530
V	Don Alonso Fajardo de Mendoza y Soto	1491 †1562
VI	Don Luis Fajardo de Mendoza y López de Ayala	†1593
VII	Don Pedro Fajardo de Mendoza y López de Ayala	
VIII	Don Alonso Fajardo de Mendoza y Fajardo de Medina	†1622
IX	Don Juan Fajardo de Mendoza y de la Cueva	1583 †1622
X	Don Alonso Fajardo de Mendoza y Guzmán	†1637
XI	Don Diego Fajardo de Mendoza y Guzmán	†1643
XII	Doña Beatriz Fajardo de Mendoza y Guzmán, Lady of Albudeyte	1619 †1678
XIII	Don Gaspar de Puixmarín y Fajardo de Mendoza	1654 †1687
XIV	Don José Rodrigo Baltasar de Puxmarín y Fajardo de Mendoza, Marquess of Albudeyte	1691
XV	Doña Josefa de Puixmarín y Fajardo de Mendoza, Countess of Montealegre	1716 †1791
XVI	Doña María Antonia Teijeiro de Valcárce y Puxmarín, Marchioness of Albudeyte, Grandee of Spain	1754 †1805
XVII	Doña Ana Agapita de Valda y Teijeiro de Valcárce, Marchioness of Albudeyte, Grandee of Spain	1781 †1854

=== Usage following the abolition of feudal tenure in Spain in the 19th century ===
Post-1820, there is evidence in the archives of the Spanish Royal Academy of History that the following descendants of the Fajardo de Mendoza family were called to the title of honour of Barón de Polop and the use of the Arms of the barony:

	Holder	Period
XVIII	Don José Eusebio Bernuy y Valda, Marquess of Valparaíso	1804 †1856
XIX	Don Francisco de Paula Bernuy y Osorio de Moscoso, Marquess of Valparaíso	1824 †1875
XX	Doña María Bernuy y Osorio de Moscoso, Marchioness of Valparaíso and Marchioness of Villafuerte	1830 †1899

The Barony is currently represented by Francisco de Borja de la Peña Fernández-Garnelo, a direct descendant of the Fajardo de Mendoza family.

== Other ==
Infantes of Aragon is an appellation commonly used by Spanish historians to refer to a group of infantes (princes) of the House of Trastámara in the 15th century.

Admiral Don Bernat de Sarrià

Doña Beatriz Fajardo de Mendoza y Guzmán also inherited the lordship of Benidorm, a half-destroyed town, depopulated, that had lost its category of municipality after having been absorbed by Polop. But in 1666 the baroness repopulated Benidorm, granted a new Puebla Letter to it and established limits for the municipality very similar to the existing ones today. By guaranteeing the supply of water through the construction of the Reg Major of l'Alfàs, she transformed Benidorm into an economically viable city, the embryo of the present city. By deed granted in April 1666 in Polop Castle, the baroness also founded the Nou Reg to irrigate 1,207 hectares of land. She lived an eventful life.

== Location ==
The municipality of Polop is located in the province of Alicante, Valencia, Spain, only a few miles from the Mediterranean Sea.

== See also ==
- Spanish feudal barony
