= Barrax =

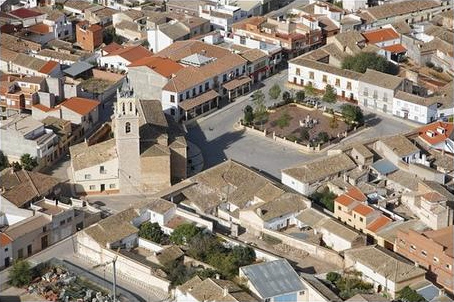

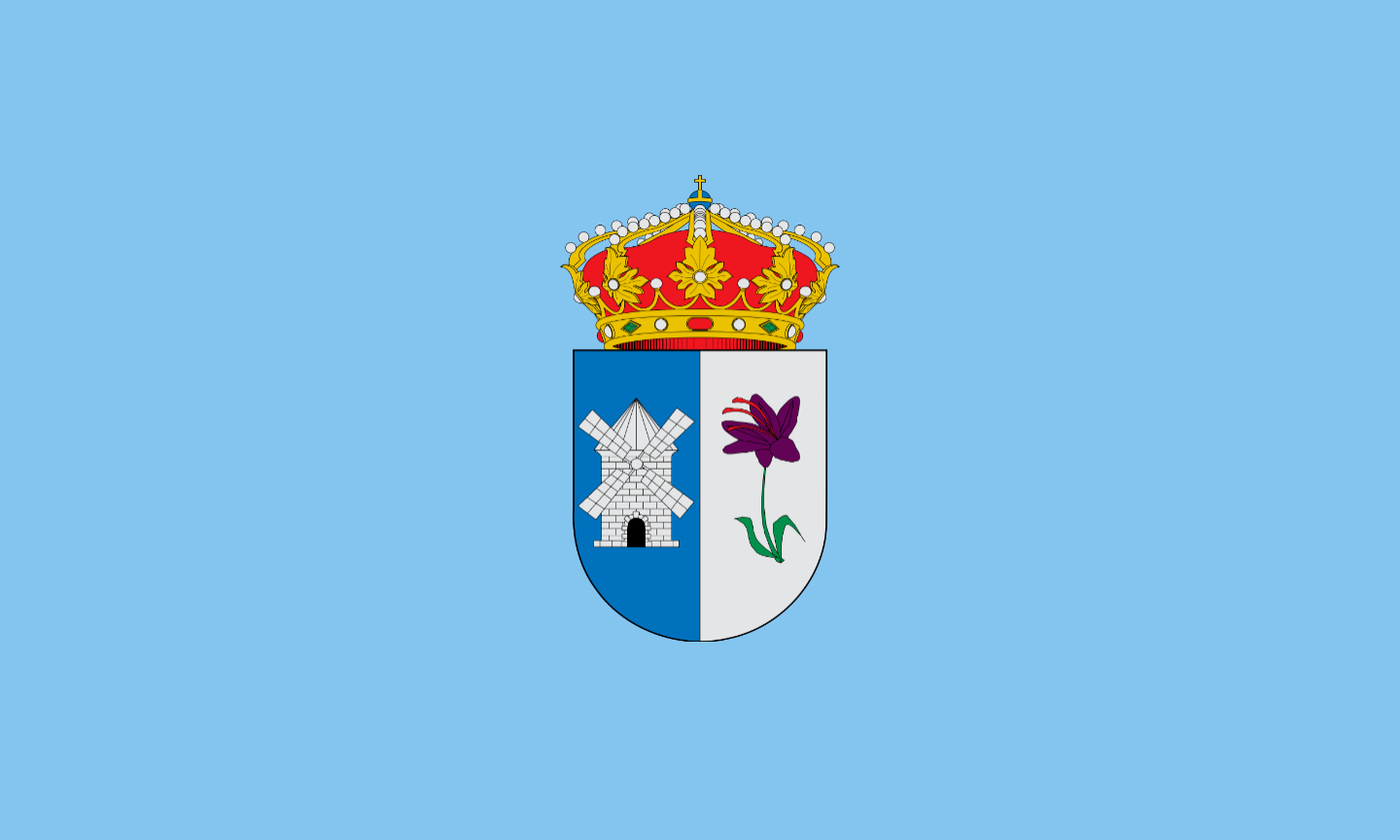
- Flag Coat of arms

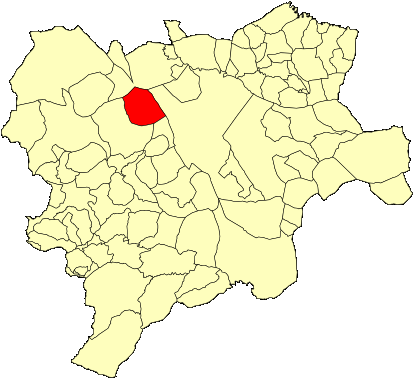
- Location of Barrax
- Coordinates: 39°02′45″N 2°12′10″W
- Municipality: Spain
- Autonomous community: Castilla-La Mancha
- Province: Albacete
- Mancomunidad: La Mancha-Centro Júcar

Government
  - Mayor: Josefa Perez Navarrete (2007)

Area
  - Total: 189.86 km^{2} (73.31 sq mi)
- Elevation: 731 m (2,398 ft)

Population (2025-01-01)
  - Total: 1,838
  - Density: 9.681/km^{2} (25.07/sq mi)
- Demonym(s): Barrajenses; Barrajeño,-ña
- Postal code: 02639
- Area code: 967
- Province code: 02
- Municipal code: 015
- Distance from Albacete: 29 km (18 mi)

Barrax is a municipality in the province of Albacete. This province belongs to the Autonomous Community of Castile-La Mancha (Spain). It is located on the plateau begins the Alcaraz mountain range. It is a mainly agricultural town surrounded by large areas of cereals.

== History ==
The origin of this population, according to tradition as there are no corroborating documents, was the call Barraj sale, old coaching inn on the road between Andalusia and the center of the peninsula and the Levant, belonging then to the jurisdiction of Alcaraz, which became independent on September 20, 1564 when he was awarded the title of Villa by royal grant of Philip II of Spain.

The matching documents are referred to the year 1601, which date from the early inscriptions of the parish archives.

The first known water capacity Barrax is opposite the church of San Roque. It is a well that is currently blocked and two other wells on the outskirts of town to Munera. Later he brought the water of El Cornudillo, farm near the border with the municipality of Lezuza and the deposit was located near the Windmill. Still remains, although not very good. Tails were typical of pitchers in the ancient square of the Colonels Montoya, today "Sunday Castillejo Mayor." After that the well of the "La Morra" on October 16, 1966, as mayor Eugenio Fernández Cuenca. On October 24, 1966, the day of San Rafael, would the water to the Plaza Mayor.

== Notable buildings ==
Parish Church of the Immaculate Conception: the neoclassical style and located in the Plaza Mayor, across from City Hall was completed in 1766, during the reign of Carlos III. Suffered severe damage during the Civil War. In 1945 there was a collapse that forced the repair and the subsequent reform of the tower, it was restored in 2001. Ermita de San Roque is located within the village and was rebuilt in 1884. In 2006 the chapel was restored, and during those works were original frescoes, dating from the early 16th century. New City Hall, located on the grounds of the former home of Lodares. It highlights their porch restored in 2006. It was recently discovered containing shields brought from the north of Spain dated on the 15th century, but in general the porch belongs to the 16th century. Ermita del Cristo del Perdon: This site was rebuilt in 1997 and redesigned by the priest Don Felix Ibarguchi. Within it is a modern Stations of the Cross spread throughout the house, also designed and conducted by the pastor. In this chapel is the statue of Christ of Forgiveness, which is a replica of the original image, burned during the Civil War by the Republicans. Windmill Barrax: Barrax this symbol, is on top of all villa. In 2006, a large walk opened in parks for children, fitness, camping tables and green areas for the enjoyment of local people and visitors. Its origin is remote, has been restored several times, the first time by Don Benjamín Palencia.

== Attractions ==
At Finca Las Tiesas have been several scientific campaigns financed by the European Space Agency (DAISEX, SEN2FLEX). They desire this location because of its flat terrain, regularly clear skies, and crops grown under controlled conditions of alfalfa and barley, among other factors. This makes it particularly interesting Barrax from the point of view of Remote Sensing. So Barrax is known throughout Europe among scientists dedicated to Earth observation Metal framed by the special gathering this county. In the municipality of Barrax, at 740 m above the plain, is the hill called "Hill of the three bishops," so named because it is the converging point in the bishoprics of Toledo, Cuenca, Cartagena until it created the Diocese of Albacete in 1950, which was incorporated in 1996 Barrax. Cerro de Santa Quiteria, the festival is held here in honor of Santa Quiteria. This mountain gives way to the landscape of La Mancha. "The fourth Philemon" This place is situated in a valley, just past the hill of Santa Quiteria. In the center of this valley, is the "Fourth Philemon" is an ancient village. A 15th-century Arab cistern is located about 300m towards Villarrobledo Barrax.

== Festivals ==
Pilgrimage in honor of Santa Quiteria is on May 22. It goes in procession to the shrine located in the homonym hill on a stretcher bearing the image. This procession has its origins in a snack made by the friends of a priest, after its mother for her birthday, on the hill of Santa Quiteria. This was repeated until it became a pilgrimage. Celebrations in honor of San Roque (13 to 17 August), with its famous bull of fire. August 15 is a tribute to the Virgen de Agosto, 16 to San Roque and San Roquillo 17. In every village, festival takes place the traditional fire Toro consisting of men, in mobile structures horn-shaped and filled with fireworks, running through the streets leading to fun runs and among those attending the celebration.
