= Villa de Ves =

Populated place in Albacete, Spain

Coordinates: 39°12′N 1°14′W

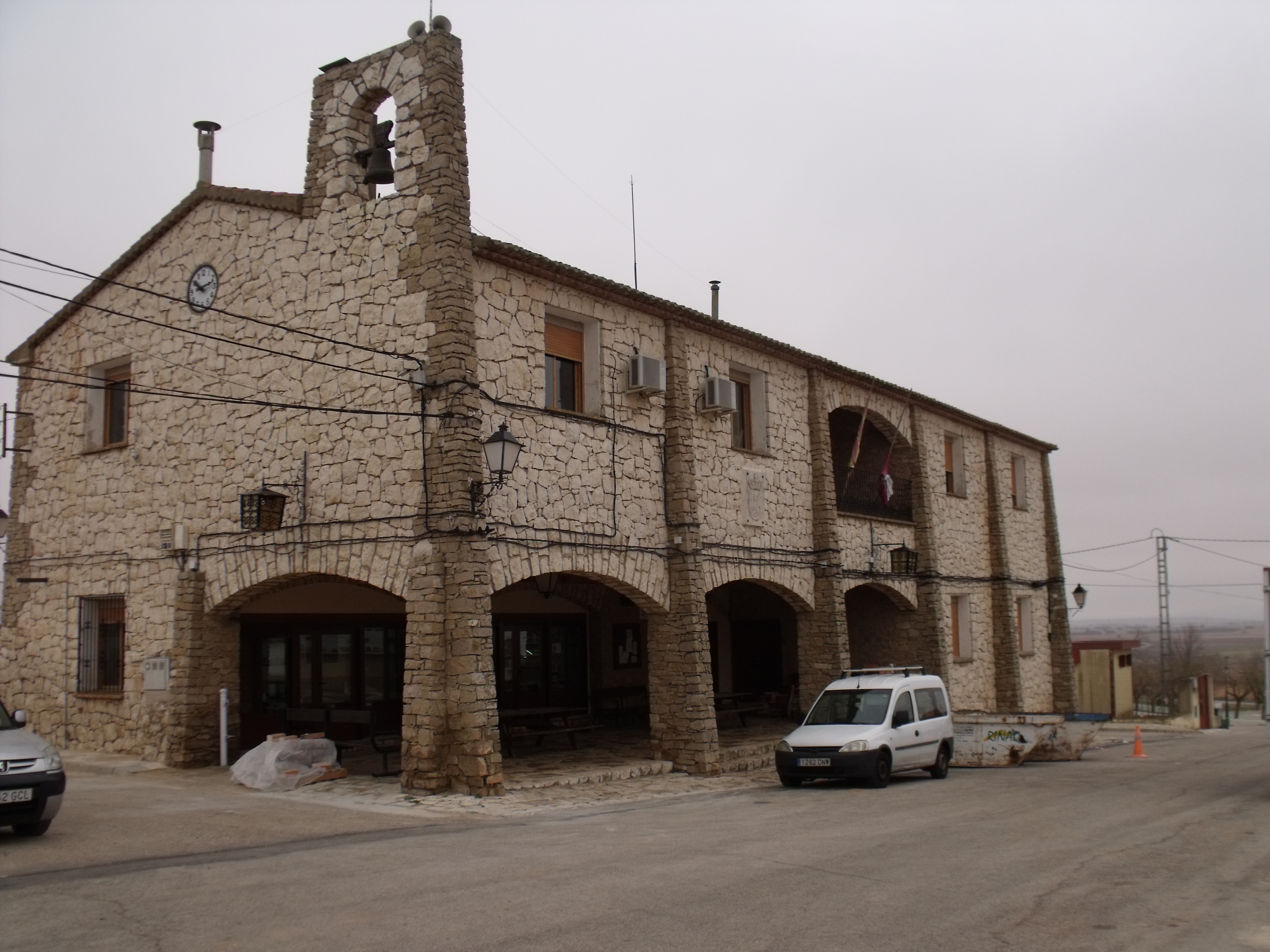
Town hall

Coat of arms of Villa de Ves

Villa de Ves is a municipality in Albacete, Castile-La Mancha, Spain. It has a population of 63.
