= Athletics at the 2024 Summer Olympics – Men's triple jump =

Men's triple jump at the Games of the XXXIII Olympiad
- Venue: Stade de France, Paris, France
- Date: 7 August 2024 (qualification) 9 August 2024 (final)
- Winning distance: 17.86 m

Medalists
1st place, gold medalist(s)		Jordan Díaz	Spain
2nd place, silver medalist(s)		Pedro Pichardo	Portugal
3rd place, bronze medalist(s)		Andy Díaz	Italy

The men's triple jump at the 2024 Summer Olympics was held in Paris, France, on 7 and 9 August 2024. This was the 30th time that the event was contested at the Summer Olympics.

== Summary ==
The entire podium from Tokyo was back. Pedro Pichardo, Zhu Yaming and Hugues Fabrice Zango. The same three individuals were the podium in 2022 though Zango was silver. In 2023, Zango was the winner ahead of Lázaro Martínez and Cristian Nápoles. Earlier in the season Jordan Díaz popped an 18.18m in Rome, the #3 legal jump in history. Pichardo, dropped to #6, was the only other person over the magic 18 metre mark all year.

Almir dos Santos got things off with 16.41m. Zango upped that by a metre to 17.43m. Pichardo followed him with 17.79m, from the back of the take off board. Martínez moved into third at exactly 17 metres. Jaydon Hibbert then took over third with a 17.31m. It was four more jumps before Jordan Díaz took the lead, popping a 17.86 m (58 ft 7 in). A couple of jumpers later, Andy Díaz moved into third position with 17.63m. In the second round, Pichardo made things close jumping a 17.84m from the middle of the board, giving up 19 cm. Had he taken off from the front of the board, that would be a winner. Hibbert improved to 17.61m to tickle 3rd place but didn't get there. Pichardo continued to have trouble with his marks and couldn't make an improvement. Jordan Díaz jumped 17.85 and 17.84 on his third and fourth jumps to confirm his position. Other than Andy adding a single cm on his final attempt, none of the leaders were able to improve or change position.

All three medalists were born in Cuba and had previously represented Cuba in international competition.

== Background ==
The men's triple jump has been present on the Olympic athletics programme since the inaugural edition in 1896.

Global records before the 2024 Summer Olympics
Record	Athlete (Nation)	Distance (m)	Location	Date
World record	Jonathan Edwards (GBR)	18.29	Gothenburg, Sweden	7 August 1995
Olympic record	Kenny Harrison (USA)	18.09	Atlanta, United States	27 July 1996
World leading	Jordan Díaz (ESP)	18.18	Rome, Italy	11 June 2024

Area records before the 2024 Summer Olympics
Area Record	Athlete (Nation)	Distance (m)
Africa (records)	Hugues Fabrice Zango (BUR)	18.07
Asia (records)	Li Yanxi (CHN)	17.59
Europe (records)	Jonathan Edwards (GBR)	18.29 WR
North, Central America and Caribbean (records)	Christian Taylor (USA)	18.21
Oceania (records)	Kenneth Lorraway (AUS)	17.46
South America (records)	Jadel Gregório (BRA)	17.90

== Qualification ==
For the men's triple jump event, the qualification period is between 1 July 2023 and 30 June 2024. 32 athletes are able to qualify for the event, with a maximum of three athletes per nation, by jumping the entry standard of 17.22 m or further or by their World Athletics Ranking for this event.

== Results ==
=== Qualification ===
The qualification was held on 7 August, starting at 19:15 (UTC+2) in the evening. 32 athletes qualified for the first round by qualification result or world ranking. Progression rules: Qualifying performance 17.10 (Q) or at least 12 best performers (q) advance to the Final.

Rank	Group	Athlete	Nation	1	2	3	Distance	Notes
1	B	Pedro Pichardo	Portugal	17.44	—	—	17.44	Q
2	A	Jordan Díaz	Spain	17.24	—	—	17.24	Q
3	B	Salif Mane	United States	17.16	—	—	17.16	Q
3	A	Hugues Fabrice Zango	Burkina Faso	17.16	—	—	17.16	Q
5	A	Almir dos Santos	Brazil	x	17.06	x	17.06	q
6	B	Jaydon Hibbert	Jamaica	16.99	16.95	x	16.99	q
7	B	Max Heß	Germany	x	16.98	16.67	16.98	q
8	B	Zhu Yaming	China	16.47	16.91	16.66	16.91	q
9	A	Yasser Triki	Algeria	x	16.85	16.77	16.85	q
10	B	Connor Murphy	Australia	16.80	16.49	16.58	16.80	q
11	B	Lázaro Martínez	Cuba	16.79	16.79	16.71	16.79	q
12	A	Andy Díaz	Italy	x	16.79	16.69	16.79	q
13	A	Jean-Marc Pontvianne	France	x	16.79	x	16.79	
14	A	Donald Scott	United States	16.58	16.77	16.74	16.77	
15	B	Thomas Gogois	France	16.67	14.63	16.77	16.77	
16	B	Su Wen	China	16.21	16.70	x	16.70	
17	A	Andy Hechavarría	Cuba	x	15.86	16.70	16.70	
18	B	Cristian Nápoles	Cuba	16.28	16.67	16.39	16.67	
19	B	Andrea Dallavalle	Italy	16.65	13.44	16.48	16.65	
20	B	Emmanuel Ihemeje	Italy	16.39	15.65	16.50	16.50	
21	B	Abdulla Aboobacker	India	15.99	16.19	16.49	16.49	
22	B	Russell Robinson	United States	16.47	16.37	16.21	16.47	
23	B	Geiner Moreno	Colombia	16.32	15.88	16.40	16.40	
24	A	Jordan Scott	Jamaica	x	16.36	15.97	16.36	
25	A	Tiago Pereira	Portugal	15.84	15.96	16.36	16.36	
26	A	Kim Jang-woo	South Korea	15.66	16.14	16.31	16.31	
27	A	Praveen Chithravel	India	15.99	16.25	16.21	16.25	
28	A	Jah-Nhai Perinchief	Bermuda	x	16.14	16.23	16.23	
29	A	Leodan Torrealba	Venezuela	16.18	x	15.44	16.18	
30	A	Ethan Olivier	New Zealand	16.16	15.91	15.98	16.16	
31	A	Fang Yaoqing	China	x	x	15.85	15.85	
32	B	Necati Er	Turkey	13.65	x	x	13.65	

=== Final ===
Rank	Athlete	Nation	1	2	3	4	5	6	Distance	Notes
1st place, gold medalist(s)	Jordan Díaz	Spain	17.86	17.64	17.85	17.84	17.25	—	17.86	
2nd place, silver medalist(s)	Pedro Pichardo	Portugal	17.79	17.84	x	17.52	—	17.81	17.84	
3rd place, bronze medalist(s)	Andy Díaz	Italy	17.63	17.33	—	—	x	17.64	17.64	SB
4	Jaydon Hibbert	Jamaica	17.31	17.61	17.53	x	x	—	17.61	
5	Hugues Fabrice Zango	Burkina Faso	17.43	16.14	17.25	16.05	17.50	x	17.50	
6	Salif Mane	United States	17.28	16.63	17.02	x	17.19	17.41	17.41	
7	Max Heß	Germany	16.50	16.92	17.38	x	x	17.07	17.38	SB
8	Lázaro Martínez	Cuba	17.00	x	17.34	13.35	x	16.63	17.34	SB
9	Yasser Triki	Algeria	x	17.05	17.22	Did not advance			17.22	
10	Zhu Yaming	China	x	16.76	x	Did not advance			16.76	
11	Almir dos Santos	Brazil	16.41	x	16.28	Did not advance			16.41	
12	Connor Murphy	Australia	15.99	16.30	16.11	Did not advance			16.30	
