= 2023 World Athletics Championships – Men's triple jump =

Men's triple jump at the 2023 World Championships
- Venue: National Athletics Centre
- Dates: 19 August 2023 (qualification); 21 August 2023 (final)
- Competitors: 37 from 24 nations
- Winning distance: 17.64

Medalists
gold medal	Hugues Fabrice Zango	Burkina Faso
silver medal	Lázaro Martínez	Cuba
bronze medal	Cristian Nápoles	Cuba

The men's triple jump at the 2023 World Athletics Championships was held at the National Athletics Centre in Budapest on 19 and 21 August 2023.

== Summary ==
With 17.15m the automatic qualifier, only 18 year old world leader Jaydon Hibbert was able to muster such a distance, his 17.70m far outdistanced that requirement.

Seven time world medalist, #3 of all time, Will Claye put out the first mark over 16.50m with a 16.71m. Two jumpers later, Hibbert came down the runway but aborted his jump after hitting the take off board. Something was not right. He went to seek medical treatment and would not return. Two more jumpers, returning silver medalist Hugues Fabrice Zango hit a 17.37m to take a big lead. Towards the end of the round, Fang Yaoqing jumped 16.89m, to move into second place, only to be displaced by Yasser Triki with a 16.96m. In the second round, Claye moved back into second place with a 16.99m. Then Lázaro Martínez flew into the lead with a 17.41m. Zhu Yaming moved onto the leader board with a 17.12m. There were no changes until the fourth round, when Cristian Nápoles tickled the lead with a 17.40m. At that point the leaders were separated by 4cm. Near the end of the fifth round, Zango broke that up with what turned out to be the winner 17.64 m (57 ft 10 1/4 in) as none of the leaders could improve enough with their final attempts.

As it turns out, Hibbert's preliminary round jump would have been enough to take gold. Instead he finished with no mark.

== Records ==
Before the competition records were as follows:

Record	Athlete & Nat.	Perf.	Location	Date
World record	Jonathan Edwards (GBR)	18.29 m (60.0 ft)	Gothenburg, Sweden	7 August 1995
Championship record	Jonathan Edwards (GBR)	18.29 m (60.0 ft)	Gothenburg, Sweden	7 August 1995
World Leading	Jaydon Hibbert (JAM)	17.87 m (58.6 ft)	Baton Rouge, United States	13 May 2023
African Record	Hugues Fabrice Zango (BUR)	18.07 m (59.3 ft) (i)	Aubiere, France	16 January 2021
Asian Record	Li Yanxi (CHN)	17.59 m (57.7 ft)	Jinan, China	26 October 2009
North, Central American and Caribbean record	Christian Taylor (USA)	18.21 m (59.7 ft)	Beijing, China	27 August 2015
South American Record	Jadel Gregório (BRA)	17.90 m (58.7 ft)	Belém, Brazil	20 May 2007
European Record	Jonathan Edwards (GBR)	18.29 m (60.0 ft)	Gothenburg, Sweden	7 August 1995
Oceanian record	Kenneth Lorraway (AUS)	17.46 m (57.3 ft)	London, United Kingdom	7 August 1982

== Qualification standard ==
The standard to qualify automatically for entry was 17.20 m.

== Schedule ==
The event schedule, in local time (UTC+2), was as follows:

Date	Time	Round
19 August	19:37	Qualification
21 August	19:40	Final

== Results ==
=== Qualification ===
Athletes attaining a mark of at least 17.15 metres ( Q ) or at least the 12 best performers ( q ) qualify for the final.

Rank	Group	Name	Nationality	Round			Mark	Notes
Rank	Group	Name	Nationality	1	2	3	Mark	Notes
1	B	Jaydon Hibbert	Jamaica	16.99	17.70		17.70	Q
2	A	Zhu Yaming	China	17.14	–	–	17.14	q
3	B	Lázaro Martínez	Cuba	16.65	16.50	17.12	17.12	q
4	A	Hugues Fabrice Zango	Burkina Faso	17.12	–	–	17.12	q
5	A	Cristian Nápoles	Cuba	x	16.82	16.95	16.95	q
6	B	Yasser Triki	Algeria	16.95	–	–	16.95	q
7	A	Emmanuel Ihemeje	Italy	16.91	16.54	–	16.91	q
8	B	Fang Yaoqing	China	16.83	16.80	x	16.83	q
9	B	Tiago Pereira	Portugal	x	x	16.77	16.77	q
10	B	Will Claye	United States	16.72	16.71	16.25	16.72	q
11	B	Leodan Torrealba	Venezuela	16.72	x	16.54	16.72	q
12	A	Chris Benard	United States	x	x	16.71	16.71	q
13	A	Tobia Bocchi	Italy	16.20	16.18	16.66	16.66	
14	A	Jean-Marc Pontvianne	France	x	16.64	15.93	16.64	
15	A	Abdulla Aboobacker	India	16.61	16.60	16.60	16.61	
16	A	Necati Er	Turkey	x	16.59	16.32	16.59	
17	B	Su Wen	China	x	x	16.59	16.59	
18	B	Max Heß	Germany	16.48	x	16.28	16.48	
19	A	Hikaru Ikehata	Japan	16.00	16.40	15.99	16.40	
20	B	Praveen Chithravel	India	16.38	16.28	16.32	16.38	
21	A	Almir dos Santos	Brazil	16.16	16.09	16.34	16.34	
22	B	Donald Scott	United States	x	16.33	16.30	16.33	
23	A	Dimitrios Tsiamis	Greece	15.99	15.95	16.22	16.22	
24	A	Kim Jang-woo	South Korea	15.89	16.19	16.21	16.21	
25	A	Enzo Hodebar	France	16.17	x	x	16.17	
26	B	Aaro Davidila	Finland	x	15.64	15.81	15.81	
27	B	Nikolaos Andrikopoulos	Greece	15.77	x	x	15.77	
28	A	Luis Reyes	Chile	15.75	x	x	15.75	
29	B	Eldhose Paul	India	15.59	15.33	15.31	15.59	
30	B	Dániel Szenderffy	Hungary	15.18	x	15.38	15.38	
31	A	Andreas Pantazis	Greece	x	14.67	x	14.67	
	A	Alexis Copello	Azerbaijan	x	x	–	NM	
	A	Julian Konle	Australia	x	x	x	NM	
	A	Jah-Nhai Perinchief	Bermuda	x	r		NM	
	A	Geiner Moreno	Colombia	x	x	x	NM	
	A	Pedro Pichardo	Portugal	DNS				

=== Final ===
Results:

Rank	Name	Nationality	Round						Mark	Notes
Rank	Name	Nationality	1	2	3	4	5	6	Mark	Notes
1st place, gold medalist(s)	Hugues Fabrice Zango	Burkina Faso	17.37	x	17.28	17.36	17.64	x	17.64	
2nd place, silver medalist(s)	Lázaro Martínez	Cuba	x	17.41	16.55	x	x	16.83	17.41	
3rd place, bronze medalist(s)	Cristian Nápoles	Cuba	x	17.02	x	17.40	x	x	17.40	PB
4	Zhu Yaming	China	x	17.12	16.53	x	17.07	17.15	17.15	
5	Yasser Triki	Algeria	16.96	16.98	17.01	x	16.63	x	17.01	
6	Fang Yaoqing	China	16.89	17.01	16.56	x	–	15.61	17.01	
7	Will Claye	United States	16.71	16.99	x	x	16.89	x	16.99	SB
8	Emmanuel Ihemeje	Italy	16.27	16.84	x	16.91	16.74	16.56	16.91	
9	Chris Benard	United States	16.21	16.62	16.03				16.62	
10	Leodan Torrealba	Venezuela	16.39	16.36	16.58				16.58	
11	Tiago Pereira	Portugal	16.26	x	x				16.26	
	Jaydon Hibbert	Jamaica	x	–	–				NM	
