= 2022 World Athletics Championships – Men's triple jump =

Men's triple jump at the 2022 World Championships
- Venue: Hayward Field
- Dates: 21 July (qualification); 23 July (final)
- Competitors: 32 from 16 nations
- Winning distance: 17.95

Medalists
gold medal	Pedro Pichardo	Portugal
silver medal	Hugues Fabrice Zango	Burkina Faso
bronze medal	Zhu Yaming	China

Video on YouTube Official Video

The men's triple jump at the 2022 World Athletics Championships was held at the Hayward Field in Eugene on 21 and 23 July 2022.

== Summary ==
With 17.05m the automatic qualifier, only two jumpers made it on their first attempt, Olympic Gold Medalist Pedro Pichardo and Olympic Silver Medalist Zhu Yaming. Returning bronze medalist Hugues Fabrice Zango and Lázaro Martínez made on their second attempt, Emmanuel Ihemeje, only 2 cm on his first attempt, finally got one on his third. It took 16.68m to get into the final, eliminating defending champion Christian Taylor who is still on the road to recovery from a 2021 achilles rupture.

As the second jumper in the final, Pichardo set a new world leader at 17.95 m (58 ft 10 1/2 in). Only two other people in the competition had ever jumped that far, none of the others had been within a foot (30cm). Three jumpers later, Zango popped 17.55m. The next jumper, Donald Scott moved into bronze position with a 17.14m which lasted only two jumps when Andrea Dallavalle hit a 17.25m. At the beginning of the second round, Pichardo confirmed his position with a 17.92m, then Zhu moved into the bronze medal position with a 17.31m. The results were set. Save a 6th round 17.17m from Ihemeje, nobody in the top 6 improved their position. Returning two time silver medalist Will Claye struggled with his marks and Martínez couldn't land a fair jump. Neither were able to qualify for three more attempts.

== Records ==
Before the competition records were as follows:

Record	Athlete & Nat.	Perf.	Location	Date
World record	Jonathan Edwards (GBR)	18.29 m	Gothenburg, Sweden	7 August 1995
Championship record	Jonathan Edwards (GBR)	18.29 m	Gothenburg, Sweden	7 August 1995
World Leading	Jordan Díaz (CUB)	17.87 m	Nerja, Spain	26 June 2022
African Record	Hugues Fabrice Zango (BUR)	18.07 m (i)	Aubiere, France	16 January 2021
Asian Record	Li Yanxi (CHN)	17.59 m	Jinan, China	26 October 2009
North, Central American and Caribbean record	Christian Taylor (USA)	18.21 m	Beijing, China	27 August 2015
South American Record	Jadel Gregório (BRA)	17.90 m	Belém, Brazil	20 May 2007
European Record	Jonathan Edwards (GBR)	18.29 m	Gothenburg, Sweden	7 August 1995
Oceanian record	Kenneth Lorraway (AUS)	17.46 m	London, Great Britain	7 August 1982

The following records were set at the competition:

Record	Perf.	Athlete	Nat.	Date
World Leading	17.95m	Pedro Pichardo	POR	23 Jul 2022

== Qualification standard ==
The standard to qualify automatically for entry was 17.14 m.

== Schedule ==
The event schedule, in local time (UTC−7), was as follows:

Date	Time	Round
21 July	18:20	Qualification
23 July	18:00	Final

== Results ==
=== Qualification ===
Athletes attaining a mark of at least 17.05 metres ( Q ) or at least the 12 best performers ( q ) qualify for the final.

Rank	Group	Name	Nationality	Round			Mark	Notes
Rank	Group	Name	Nationality	1	2	3	Mark	Notes
1	A	Pedro Pichardo	Portugal	17.16			17.16	Q
2	B	Hugues Fabrice Zango	Burkina Faso	16.72	17.15		17.15	Q
3	B	Emmanuel Ihemeje	Italy	17.03	-	17.13	17.13	Q, SB
4	A	Zhu Yaming	China	17.08			17.08	Q
5	B	Lázaro Martínez	Cuba	16.97	17.06		17.06	Q
6	B	Jean-Marc Pontvianne	France	x	16.95	x	16.95	q
7	A	Andrea Dallavalle	Italy	16.86	16.75	-	16.86	q
8	A	Donald Scott	United States	x	16.74	16.84	16.84	q
9	A	Almir dos Santos	Brazil	16.32	16.52	16.71	16.71	q
10	B	Will Claye	United States	15.98	16.25	16.70	16.70	q
11	B	Tiago Pereira	Portugal	x	16.69	16.56	16.69	q
12	A	Eldhose Paul	India	16.12	16.68	16.34	16.68	q
13	A	Max Heß	Germany	16.64	15.69	16.56	16.64	
14	B	Enzo Hodebar	France	16.64	x	x	16.64	
15	B	Tobia Bocchi	Italy	16.58	x	16.20	16.58	
16	B	Chris Benard	United States	x	x	16.53	16.53	
17	A	Praveen Chithravel	India	x	16.30	16.49	16.49	
18	A	Christian Taylor	United States	16.17	16.48	16.44	16.48	
19	B	Abdulla Aboobacker Narangolintevida	India	15.92	16.45	16.44	16.45	
20	A	Jordan Scott	Jamaica	x	x	16.42	16.42	
21	A	Andy Hechavarría	Cuba	x	16.02	16.39	16.39	
22	A	Jah-Nhai Perinchief	Bermuda	16.38	x	16.26	16.38	
23	A	Pablo Torrijos	Spain	x	16.32	x	16.32	
24	B	Mateus de Sá	Brazil	16.04	16.03	x	16.04	
25	A	Benjamin Compaoré	France	x	16.03	x	16.03	
26	A	Ben Williams	Great Britain & N.I.	x	x	15.98	15.98	
27	B	Chengetayi Mapaya	Zimbabwe	x	15.75	x	15.75	
	B	Alexsandro Melo	Brazil	x	x	x	NM	
	B	Fang Yaoqing	China					DNS

=== Final ===
Results:

Rank	Name	Nationality	Round						Mark	Notes
Rank	Name	Nationality	1	2	3	4	5	6	Mark	Notes
1st place, gold medalist(s)	Pedro Pichardo	Portugal	17.95	17.92	17.57	–	x	17.51	17.95	WL
2nd place, silver medalist(s)	Hugues Fabrice Zango	Burkina Faso	17.55	16.95	17.38	17.14	x	17.49	17.55	SB
3rd place, bronze medalist(s)	Zhu Yaming	China	17.00	17.31	x	16.98	x	16.85	17.31	SB
4	Andrea Dallavalle	Italy	17.25	17.16	–	17.12	x	x	17.25	
5	Emmanuel Ihemeje	Italy	x	17.03	16.69	16.81	16.71	17.17	17.17	
6	Donald Scott	United States	17.14	x	16.79	16.98	17.04	16.94	17.14	
7	Almir dos Santos	Brazil	x	16.69	16.87	x	16.38	13.26	16.87	
8	Jean-Marc Pontvianne	France	x	x	16.86	x	x	x	16.86	
9	Eldhose Paul	India	16.37	16.79	13.86				16.79	
10	Tiago Pereira	Portugal	x	16.69	16.59				16.69	
11	Will Claye	United States	x	x	16.54				16.54	
	Lázaro Martínez	Cuba	x	x	x				NM	
