= 2025 World Athletics Championships – Men's triple jump =

Men's triple jump at the 2025 World Athletics Championships
- Venue: National Stadium
- Location: Tokyo, Japan
- Dates: 17 September (qualification); 19 September (final)
- Winning distance: 17.91 m WL

Medalists
gold medal	Pedro Pichardo	Portugal
silver medal	Andrea Dallavalle	Italy
bronze medal	Lázaro Martínez	Cuba

The men's triple jump at the 2025 World Athletics Championships was held at the National Stadium in Tokyo on 17 and 19 September 2025.

== Records ==
Before the competition records were as follows:

Record	Athlete & Nat.	Perf.	Location	Date
World record	Jonathan Edwards (GBR)	18.29 m	Gothenburg, Sweden	7 August 1995
Championship record	Jonathan Edwards (GBR)	18.29 m	Gothenburg, Sweden	7 August 1995
World Leading	Andy Díaz (ITA)	17.87 m (i)	Nanjing, China	21 March 2025
African Record	Hugues Fabrice Zango (BUR)	18.07 m (i)	Aubiere, France	16 January 2021
Asian Record	Wu Ruiting (CHN)	17.68 m	Quzhou, China	4 August 2025
European Record	Jonathan Edwards (GBR)	18.29 m	Gothenburg, Sweden	7 August 1995
North, Central American and Caribbean record	Christian Taylor (USA)	18.21 m	Beijing, China	27 August 2015
Oceanian record	Kenneth Lorraway (AUS)	17.46 m	London, United Kingdom	7 August 1982
South American Record	Jadel Gregório (BRA)	17.90 m	Belém, Brazil	20 May 2007

== Qualification standard ==
The standard to qualify automatically for entry was 17.22 m.

== Schedule ==
The event schedule, in local time (UTC+9), was as follows:

Date	Time	Round
17 September	19:05	Qualification
19 September	20:50	Final

== Results ==
=== Qualification ===
All athletes over 17.10 m ( Q ) or at least the 12 best performers ( q ) advanced to the final.

==== Group A ====
Place	Athlete	Nation	Round			Mark	Notes
Place	Athlete	Nation	#1	#2	#3	Mark	Notes
1	Yasser Triki	Algeria	17.26 (+0.7 m/s)			17.26 m (+0.7 m/s)	Q
2	Andrea Dallavalle	Italy	17.08 (+0.6 m/s)	–	–	17.08 m (+0.6 m/s)	q
3	Jonathan Seremes	France	x	16.66 (+0.6 m/s)	17.07 (+0.7 m/s)	17.07 m (+0.7 m/s)	q
4	Lázaro Martínez	Cuba	16.93 (+0.1 m/s)	x	16.83 (+0.4 m/s)	16.93 m (+0.1 m/s)	q
5	Endiorass Kingley	Austria	16.58 (+0.3 m/s)	16.85 (+0.5 m/s)	16.56 (+0.8 m/s)	16.85 m (+0.5 m/s)	q, =NR
6	Almir dos Santos	Brazil	16.70 (+0.4 m/s)	16.79 (+0.6 m/s)	16.60 (+0.7 m/s)	16.79 m (+0.6 m/s)	
7	Wu Ruiting	China	16.60 (+0.3 m/s)	16.64 (+0.4 m/s)	16.74 (+0.8 m/s)	16.74 m (+0.8 m/s)	
8	Connor Murphy	Australia	16.54 (+0.4 m/s)	16.58 (+0.7 m/s)	x	16.58 m (+0.7 m/s)	
9	Will Claye	United States	16.18 (+0.6 m/s)	16.45 (+0.5 m/s)	16.52 (+0.6 m/s)	16.52 m (+0.6 m/s)	
10	Abdulla Aboobacker	India	x	x	16.33 (+0.7 m/s)	16.33 m (+0.7 m/s)	
11	Leodan Torrealba	Venezuela	16.06 (+0.2 m/s)	16.23 (+0.5 m/s)	16.26 (+0.5 m/s)	16.26 m (+0.5 m/s)	
12	Cristian Nápoles	Cuba	14.01 (+0.3 m/s)	16.21 (+0.6 m/s)	16.12 (+0.5 m/s)	16.21 m (+0.6 m/s)	
13	Max Heß	Germany	16.09 (+0.5 m/s)	13.54 (+0.4 m/s)	r	16.09 m (+0.5 m/s)	
14	Yoann Awhansou	Benin	15.97 (+0.3 m/s)	x	x	15.97 m (+0.3 m/s)	
	Tiago Pereira	Portugal	x	x	x	NM	
	Jordan Díaz	Spain	x	r		NM	
	Russell Robinson	United States	x	x	x	NM	
	Melvin Raffin	France				DNS	

==== Group B ====
Place	Athlete	Nation	Round			Mark	Notes
Place	Athlete	Nation	#1	#2	#3	Mark	Notes
1	Jordan Scott	Jamaica	17.00 (+0.1 m/s)	17.19 (+0.4 m/s)		17.19 m (+0.4 m/s)	Q
2	Pedro Pichardo	Portugal	16.72 (−0.1 m/s)	17.09 (+0.7 m/s)		17.09 m (+0.7 m/s)	q
3	Hugues Fabrice Zango	Burkina Faso	x	16.94 (+0.7 m/s)	16.60 (+0.5 m/s)	16.94 m (+0.7 m/s)	q
4	Andy Díaz	Italy	x	16.94 (+0.6 m/s)	–	16.94 m (+0.6 m/s)	q
5	Su Wen	China	x	16.90 (+0.4 m/s)	x	16.90 m (+0.4 m/s)	q
6	Salif Mane	United States	16.86 (+0.1 m/s)	16.11 (+0.7 m/s)	16.15 (+0.5 m/s)	16.86 m (+0.1 m/s)	q
7	Zhu Yaming	China	x	16.46 (+0.6 m/s)	16.83 (+0.5 m/s)	16.83 m (+0.5 m/s)	q
8	Praveen Chitravel	India	x	16.38 (+0.4 m/s)	16.74 (+0.7 m/s)	16.74 m (+0.7 m/s)	
9	Ethan Olivier	New Zealand	16.26 (+0.1 m/s)	16.60 (+0.3 m/s)	15.33 (+0.3 m/s)	16.60 m (+0.3 m/s)	
10	Chengetayi Mapaya	Zimbabwe	16.49 (−0.1 m/s)	16.49 (+0.3 m/s)	16.59 (+0.2 m/s)	16.59 m (+0.2 m/s)	
11	Elton Petronilho	Brazil	x	16.51 (±0.0 m/s)	16.30 (+0.4 m/s)	16.51 m (±0.0 m/s)	
12	Amath Faye	Senegal	16.36 (−0.1 m/s)	16.49 (+0.5 m/s)	x	16.49 m (+0.5 m/s)	
13	Andy Hechavarría	Cuba	16.30 (+0.2 m/s)	x	16.48 (+0.3 m/s)	16.48 m (+0.3 m/s)	
14	Kaiwan Culmer	Bahamas	x	16.39 (+0.5 m/s)	x	16.39 m (+0.5 m/s)	
15	Sami Bakheet	Saudi Arabia	16.26 (−0.1 m/s)	x	15.95 (+0.1 m/s)	16.26 m (−0.1 m/s)	
16	Yu Gyu-min	South Korea	15.83 (−0.2 m/s)	16.19 (+0.6 m/s)	x	16.19 m (+0.6 m/s)	
17	Can Özüpek	Turkey	15.65 (−0.1 m/s)	15.51 (+0.4 m/s)	x	15.65 m (+0.4 m/s)	
18	Thomas Gogois	France	x	x	14.09 (+0.5 m/s)	14.09 m (+0.5 m/s)	

=== Final ===
Place	Athlete	Nation	Round						Mark	Notes
Place	Athlete	Nation	#1	#2	#3	#4	#5	#6	Mark	Notes
1st place, gold medalist(s)	Pedro Pichardo	Portugal	17.07	17.55	17.55	17.36	–	17.91	17.91	WL
2nd place, silver medalist(s)	Andrea Dallavalle	Italy	17.00	16.93	17.24	17.06	17.15	17.64	17.64	PB
3rd place, bronze medalist(s)	Lázaro Martínez	Cuba	17.16	17.49	x	x	x	x	17.49	SB
4	Yasser Triki	Algeria	17.25	x	17.17	x	x	17.23	17.25	
5	Jordan Scott	Jamaica	x	17.19	16.94	16.74	17.21	x	17.21	
6	Andy Díaz	Italy	x	16.35	17.19	16.93	x	16.81	17.19	
7	Hugues Fabrice Zango	Burkina Faso	16.63	16.67	16.92	16.30	16.83		16.92	
8	Jonathan Seremes	France	16.50	16.82	16.10	x	16.61		16.82	
9	Endiorass Kingley	Austria	16.52	16.65	16.71	16.47			16.71	
10	Su Wen	China	x	x	16.66	14.54			16.66	
11	Zhu Yaming	China	16.51	x	16.51				16.51	
12	Salif Mane	United States	16.29	15.93	15.86				16.29	
