= Athletics at the 2022 Asian Games – Men's triple jump =

Men's triple jump at the 2022 Asian Games
- Venue: Hangzhou Olympic Expo Main Stadium
- Date: 3 October 2023
- Competitors: 13 from 10 nations

Medalists
gold medal	Zhu Yaming	China
silver medal	Fang Yaoqing	China
bronze medal	Praveen Chithravel	India

The men's triple jump competition at the 2022 Asian Games took place on 3 October 2023 at the HOC Stadium, Hangzhou.

== Schedule ==
All times are China Standard Time (UTC+08:00)

Date	Time	Event
Tuesday, 3 October 2023	19:10	Final

== Records ==
Prior to this competition, the existing world, Asian and Games records were as follows.

World Record	Jonathan Edwards (GBR)	18.29	Gothenburg, Sweden	7 August 1995
Asian Record	Li Yanxi (CHN)	17.59	Jinan, China	26 October 2009
Games Record	Zou Sixin (CHN)	17.31	Beijing, China	3 October 1990

== Results ==
Rank	Athlete	Attempt						Result	Notes
Rank	Athlete	1	2	3	4	5	6	Result	Notes
1st place, gold medalist(s)	Zhu Yaming (CHN)	16.41 +1.0	16.94 +1.4	17.13 +0.9	16.90 −0.6	—	16.44 +0.3	17.13	
2nd place, silver medalist(s)	Fang Yaoqing (CHN)	16.78 −0.7	16.93 +0.4	14.63 +0.8	16.47 +0.2	—	15.92 +0.2	16.93	
3rd place, bronze medalist(s)	Praveen Chithravel (IND)	16.68 +0.2	16.63 +0.2	X	16.34 +1.0	16.07 −0.5	X	16.68	
4	Abdulla Aboobacker (IND)	15.39 −0.3	16.62 +0.9	X	16.45 +1.2	16.35 +0.1	16.47; 0.0	16.62	
5	Yu Gyu-min (KOR)	15.14 +0.4	16.28 +0.6	15.77 −0.1	15.85 +0.1	15.99 −0.7	16.28 +0.2	16.28	
6	Li Yun-chen (TPE)	16.17 +0.6	X	16.07; 0.0	X	X	16.06 −0.1	16.17	
7	Kim Jang-woo (KOR)	15.93 +1.9	15.45 +0.6	15.49 +0.7	X	15.87 +0.4	16.02 +0.7	16.02	
8	Andre Anura (MAS)	15.99 +1.2	15.58 +0.5	15.83 +0.5	X	15.66; 0.0	16.00 −0.3	16.00	
9	Oumar Moussa Mahamat (BRN)	15.09 +0.1	15.19; 0.0	15.65 −0.1				15.65	
10	Ronne Malipay (PHI)	15.52 +0.5	15.24 +0.5	X				15.52	
11	Muhammad Afzal (PAK)	14.18; 0.0	15.10 +0.3	X				15.10	
12	Salim Al-Yarabi (OMA)	14.68 +0.6	X	—				14.68	
13	Che Long Kin (MAC)	14.22 +1.1	13.96 +0.5	14.09; 0.0				14.22	
