= 2026 World Athletics Indoor Championships – Men's triple jump =

Men's triple jump at the 2026 World Athletics Indoor Championships
- Venue: Kujawsko-Pomorska Arena Toruń
- Location: Toruń, Poland
- Dates: 20 March
- Winning distance: 17.47 m

Medalists
gold medal	Andy Díaz	Italy
silver medal	Jordan Scott	Jamaica
bronze medal	Yasser Triki	Algeria

The men's triple jump at the 2026 World Athletics Indoor Championships took place on the short track of the Kujawsko-Pomorska Arena Toruń in Toruń, Poland, on 20 March 2026. This was the 22nd time the event was contested at the World Athletics Indoor Championships. Athletes could qualify by achieving the entry standard or by their World Athletics Ranking in the event.

== Background ==
The men's triple jump was contested 21 times before 2026, at every previous edition of the World Athletics Indoor Championships.

Records before the 2026 World Athletics Indoor Championships
Record	Athlete (nation)	Distance (m)	Location	Date
World record	Jonathan Edwards (USA)	18.29	Gothenburg, Sweden	7 August 1995
Championship record	Teddy Tamgho (FRA)	17.90	Doha, Qatar	14 March 2010
2026 World Lead	Yasser Triki (ALG)	17.35	Liévin, France	19 February 2026

== Qualification ==
For the men's triple jump, the qualification period ran from 1 November 2025 until 8 March 2026. Athletes could qualify by achieving the entry standard of 16.90 m. Athletes could also qualify by virtue of their World Athletics Ranking for the event or by virtue of their World Athletics Indoor Tour wildcard. There is a target number of 16 athletes.

== Results ==
=== Final ===
The final was held on 20 March, starting at 19:35 (UTC+1) in the evening.

Results of the final
Place	Athlete	Nation	#1	#2	#3	#4	#5	#6	Result	Notes
1st place, gold medalist(s)	Andy Díaz	Italy	17.47	16.91	-	17.08	x	x	17.47	WL
2nd place, silver medalist(s)	Jordan Scott	Jamaica	17.29	17.30	17.33	x	17.31	16.88	17.33	SB
3rd place, bronze medalist(s)	Yasser Triki	Algeria	17.17	17.23	17.21	17.30	17.26	16.62	17.30	
4	Lázaro Martínez	Cuba	17.02	17.14	x	16.80	17.03	16.90	17.14	SB
5	Jonathan Seremes	France	16.93	16.59	15.94	x	16.07	16.86	16.93	
6	Almir dos Santos	Brazil	x	16.34	16.63	16.92	x	13.48	16.92	
7	Andrea Dallavalle	Italy	16.34	16.88	16.90	16.85	16.79		16.90	
8	Amath Faye	Senegal	x	16.29	16.76	x	15.47		16.76	
9	Su Wen	China	16.64	16.28	x	x			16.64	
10	Elton Petronilho	Brazil	16.59	16.55	x	16.61			16.61	
11	Russell Robinson	United States	16.53	x	x				16.53	
12	Andy Hechavarría	Cuba	16.41	16.32	16.42				16.42	
13	Necati Er	Turkey	x	16.15	16.36				16.36	
14	Gor Hovakimyan	Armenia	16.08	16.19	16.25				16.25	
15	Chengetayi Mapaya	Zimbabwe	16.09	16.25	16.02				16.25	
16	Andreas Pantazis	Greece	15.45	15.35	x				15.45	
	Melvin Raffin	France	x	x	x				NM	
