= 2025 Asian Athletics Championships – Men's triple jump =

Men's triple jump at the 2025 Asian Athletics Championships
- Venue: Gumi Civic Stadium
- Location: Gumi, South Korea
- Dates: 28 May
- Competitors: 15 from 11 nations
- Winning distance: 17.06 m

Medalists
| gold medal | Zhu Yaming | China |
| silver medal | Praveen Chithravel | India |
| bronze medal | Gyumin Yu | South Korea |

The men's triple jump event at the 2025 Asian Athletics Championships was held on 28 May.

== Records ==
Records before the 2025 Asian Athletics Championships
| Record | Athlete (nation) | Distance (m) | Location | Date |
|---|---|---|---|---|
| World record | Jonathan Edwards (GBR) | 18.29 | Gothenburg, Sweden | 7 August 1995 |
| Asian record | Li Yanxi (CHN) | 17.59 | Jinan, China | 26 October 2009 |
| Championship record | Chen Yanping (CHN) | 17.22 | Kuala Lumpur, Malaysia | 23 October 1991 |
| World leading | Andy Díaz (ITA) | 17.80 | Nanjing, China | 21 March 2025 |
| Asian leading | Praveen Chithravel (IND) | 17.37 | Kochi, India | 24 April 2025 |

== Schedule ==
The event schedule, in local time (UTC+9), is as follows:

| Date | Time | Round |
|---|---|---|
| 28 May | 17:20 | Final |

== Results ==
| Place | Athlete | Nation | #1 | #2 | #3 | #4 | #5 | #6 | Result | Notes |
|---|---|---|---|---|---|---|---|---|---|---|
| 1st place, gold medalist(s) | Zhu Yaming | China | 17.06 (+1.4 m/s) | 17.01 (+1.9 m/s) | 16.87 (+0.4 m/s) | x | x | | 17.06 m (+1.4 m/s) | |
| 2nd place, silver medalist(s) | Praveen Chithravel | India | 16.60 (+0.7 m/s) | 16.69 (+0.8 m/s) | 16.90 (+1.9 m/s) | 16.23 (+0.0 m/s) | 16.19 (+0.5 m/s) | x | 16.90 m (+1.9 m/s) | |
| 3rd place, bronze medalist(s) | Yu Kyu-min | South Korea | 16.10 (+0.8 m/s) | 16.82 (+2.1 m/s) | 16.55 (+0.9 m/s) | x | x | | 16.82 m (+2.1 m/s) | SB |
| 4 | Abdulla Aboobacker | India | 16.40 (+0.8 m/s) | 16.72 (+0.8 m/s) | 16.69 (+1.2 m/s) | 16.39 (+0.2 m/s) | x | x | 16.72 m (+0.8 m/s) | |
| 5 | Ibrokhim Mahkamov | Uzbekistan | 16.24 (+1.6 m/s) | 15.96 (+1.0 m/s) | 15.51 (+1.3 m/s) | 15.91 (+0.0 m/s) | 15.70 (+0.0 m/s) | 15.98 (+0.2 m/s) | 16.24 m (+1.6 m/s) | PB |
| 6 | Zelimkhan Nassyrov | Kazakhstan | 15.40 (+0.6 m/s) | 16.21 (+2.0 m/s) | 15.86 (+0.6 m/s) | x | 14.98 (−0.4 m/s) | | 16.21 m (+2.0 m/s) | PB |
| 7 | Li Yun-chen | Chinese Taipei | 15.26 (+1.3 m/s) | 16.15 (+2.2 m/s) | 15.98 (−0.2 m/s) | x | 15.82 (−0.2 m/s) | x | 16.15 m (+2.2 m/s) | |
| 8 | Phumiphat Khunmangkom | Thailand | 15.80 (+1.8 m/s) | x | 16.02 (+0.8 m/s) | x | x | 14.58 (−0.2 m/s) | 16.02 m (+0.8 m/s) | |
| 9 | Hassan Nasser Darouiche | Saudi Arabia | 15.83 (+2.5 m/s) | x | x | | | | 15.83 m (+2.5 m/s) | |
| 10 | Ronnie Malipay | Philippines | 15.41 (+0.9 m/s) | 15.73 (+1.7 m/s) | 15.57 (+0.7 m/s) | | | | 15.73 m (+1.7 m/s) | SB |
| 11 | Nattapong Srinonta | Thailand | x | 15.73 (+2.9 m/s) | 15.19 (+2.2 m/s) | | | | 15.73 m (+2.9 m/s) | |
| 12 | Sami Bakheet | Saudi Arabia | x | x | 15.52 (+0.6 m/s) | | | | 15.52 m (+0.6 m/s) | |
| 13 | Wong Chun Wing | Hong Kong | x | 15.13 (+1.2 m/s) | 15.00 (+0.7 m/s) | | | | 15.13 m (+1.2 m/s) | |
| 14 | Chan Chi Keung | Hong Kong | 13.97 (+0.5 m/s) | 14.61 (±0.0 m/s) | 14.63 (+0.1 m/s) | | | | 14.63 m (+0.1 m/s) | |
| 15 | Salim Saydaliev | Tajikistan | x | 13.96 (−0.2 m/s) | 14.46 (+1.3 m/s) | | | | 14.46 m (+1.3 m/s) | |
