= 2024 World Athletics Indoor Championships – Men's triple jump =

Men's triple jump at the 2024 World Athletics Indoor Championships
- Venue: Commonwealth Arena
- Dates: 2 March
- Competitors: 14 from 11 nations
- Winning distance: 17.53

Medalists
gold medal	Hugues Fabrice Zango	Burkina Faso
silver medal	Yasser Triki	Algeria
bronze medal	Tiago Pereira	Portugal

The men's triple jump at the 2024 World Athletics Indoor Championships took place on 1 March 2024.

== Results ==
The final was started at 19:40.

Rank	Athlete	Nationality	#1	#2	#3	#4	#5	#6	Result	Notes
1st place, gold medalist(s)	Hugues Fabrice Zango	Burkina Faso	16.69	17.33	17.31	17.03	17.53	15.39	17.53	
2nd place, silver medalist(s)	Yasser Triki	Algeria	17.35	x	x	–	–	–	17.35	
3rd place, bronze medalist(s)	Tiago Pereira	Portugal	x	16.74	x	x	x	17.08	17.08	SB
4	Fang Yaoqing	China	x	16.93	16.41	–	–	16.85	16.93	SB
5	Emmanuel Ihemeje	Italy	16.90	15.61	x	16.36	x	16.73	16.90	
6	Donald Scott	United States	16.11	x	16.77	16.84	16.88	16.50	16.88	SB
7	Zhu Yaming	China	16.57	x	16.72	x	16.71	16.24	16.72	SB
8	Lázaro Martínez	Cuba	16.68	x	16.69	x	x	16.39	16.69	
9	Max Heß	Germany	16.66	16.39	16.65				16.66	
10	Almir dos Santos	Brazil	x	16.55	16.63				16.63	SB
11	Praveen Chithravel	India	15.76	16.29	16.45				16.45	SB
12	Chris Benard	United States	x	x	16.14				16.14	
13	Cristian Nápoles	Cuba	x	15.98	r				15.98	
14	Dimitrios Tsiamis	Greece	x	15.95	15.87				15.95	
