= Jordan Scott (triple jumper) =

Jamaican athlete (born 1997)

Personal information
- Nationality: Jamaican
- Born: 29 June 1997 (age 29)
- Home town: Portmore, Jamaica

Sport
- Sport: Athletics
- Event: Triple jump
- University team: Virginia Cavaliers
- Coached by: Aaron Gadson

Achievements and titles
- Personal bests: Triple jump: 17.69 m (Doha, 2026)
Medal record
Men's athletics
Representing Jamaica
World Indoor Championships
Silver medal – second place	2026 Toruń	Triple jump
Commonwealth Game
Gold medal – first place	2026 Glasgow	Triple jump
Diamond League
Third place	2026 Brussels	Triple Jump
CARIFTA Games U20
Silver medal – second place	2016 St. George's	Triple jump
Silver medal – second place	2014 Fort-de-France	Triple jump

Jordan Scott (born 29 June 1997) is a Jamaican triple jumper. He is a multiple-time national champion and won the silver medal representing Jamaica at the 2026 World Indoor Championships and the gold medal at the 2026 Commonwealth Games.

== Early life ==
He attended Campion College, Jamaica. He finished sixth in the final of the IAAF World U20 Championships in Bydgoszcz in July 2016. Shortly afterwards, he started at the University of Virginia.

== Career ==
He won his first national title in the triple jump in 2018. In May 2019, he jumped a personal best distance of 17.08 metres in Charlottesville, Virginia. He was the winner of the 2019 triple jump at the NCAA Division I Indoor Track and Field Championships. In September 2019, he represent Jamaica at the 2019 World Athletics Championships in Doha. He won the Jamaican Athletics Championships again in June 2021.

He competed at the 2022 World Athletics Championships in Eugene, Oregon. He finished fifth in the final of the Athletics at the 2022 Commonwealth Games – Men's triple jump in August 2022.

== 2024 ==
He won the Jamaican Athletics Championships in 2024. He competed in the triple jump at the 2024 Paris Olympics.

== 2025 ==
He was named in the Jamaican team for the 2025 World Athletics Indoor Championships in Nanjing in March 2025, where he placed fifth overall in the final of the triple jump, with a late-round jump of 17.10 metres. However, he was later upgraded to a fourth-place finish after Brazilian Almir dos Santos was disqualified after the event for competing in shoes which went against the regulations.

He landed a personal best to win the triple jump at the 2025 Xiamen Diamond League event in China, in April 2025. The following weekend, he had a second-place finish at the 2025 Shanghai Diamond League, with a best jump of 17.00 metres. He jumped a 17.34 metres personal best to win the 2025 Bislett Games and 17.27 metres to win the 2025 Meeting de Paris, both part of the 2025 Diamond League, in June 2025. He won the triple jump at the 2025 Jamaican Athletics Championships with a jump of 17.15 metres. He set a new personal best of 17.44 metres and then increased it to 17.52 metres to win the 2025 Herculis event in Monaco on 11 July 2025. He placed fourth at the Diamond League Final in Zurich on 28 August.

In September 2025, he was a finalist at the 2025 World Championships in Tokyo, Japan, placing fifth overall.

== 2026 ==
Scott won the silver medal representing Jamaica at the 2026 World Athletics Indoor Championships in Toruń, Poland, on 20 March 2026, recording a best jump of 17.33 metres. In May, Scott jumped a personal best 17.66 m to win the men's triple jump at the Coqui International Cup in Puerto Rico. On 4 June, Scott finished second with 17.33m at the 2026 Golden Gala in Rome and the following week won in the Diamond League in Oslo ahead of Andy Diaz and Yasser Triki, his fellow medalists in Toruń. On 19 June, Scott jumped a personal best 17.69 m to place second to Pedro Pichardo at the 2026 Doha Diamond League. On 1 August 2026, he won the gold medal at the 2026 Commonwealth Games in Glasgow, Scotland, leading the competition from start to finish following an opening leap of 16.52m, and improving later to 16.72m. At the 2026 Diamond League Final in Brussels in September, he finished third with 17.18 metres.

== Personal Life ==
He is the son of Lorna Minott. Scott has three siblings.
