= 2018 IAAF World Indoor Championships – Men's triple jump =

Men's triple jump at the 2018 IAAF World Indoor Championships
- Venue: Arena Birmingham
- Dates: 3 March
- Competitors: 15 from 12 nations
- Winning distance: 17.43 m WL

Medalists
gold medal	Will Claye	United States
silver medal	Almir dos Santos	Brazil
bronze medal	Nelson Évora	Portugal

The men's triple jump at the 2018 IAAF World Indoor Championships took place on 3 March 2018.

The winning margin was 2 cm which as of July 2024 remains the narrowest winning margin in the men's triple jump at these championships.

== Summary ==
The fifteen athletes went directly to the final. Veteran Nelson Évora was the only man to jump beyond 17 metres in the first round, his 17.14m taking the lead. Alexis Copello took the lead temporarily in the second round with 17.17 m, surpassed near the end of the round by Almir dos Santos' 17.22 m. Defending champion, Dong Bin's 16.84 m in the round barely got him into the finals, but it was his best of the day. Returning silver medalist Max Heß didn't make the finals, his only mark at 16.47 m in the third round. At the end of that round, Évora improved upon his own ten-year-old national record with a 17.40 m to take back the lead. After the preliminary rounds, two-time Olympic silver medalist Will Claye found himself in fifth place. On his fourth attempt, he rectified that by jumping the 17.43 m (57 ft 2 in) winner. In the fifth round, dos Santos got off a 17.41 m to squeeze ahead of Évora to take silver.

== Results ==
The final was started at 19:08.

Rank	Athlete	Nationality	#1	#2	#3	#4	#5	#6	Result	Notes
1st place, gold medalist(s)	Will Claye	United States	16.89	16.86	16.76	17.43	17.35	17.31	17.43	WL
2nd place, silver medalist(s)	Almir dos Santos	Brazil	16.70	17.22	16.97	x	17.41	x	17.41	PB
3rd place, bronze medalist(s)	Nelson Évora	Portugal	17.14	x	17.40	17.25	x	16.71	17.40	NIR
4	Alexis Copello	Azerbaijan	x	17.17	17.05	16.82	x	x	17.17	SB
5	Chris Carter	United States	16.76	16.70	16.75	17.04	17.15	—N/a	17.15	
6	Hugues Fabrice Zango	Burkina Faso	16.16	16.57	17.11	16.71	16.87	—N/a	17.11	
7	Zhu Yaming	China	16.66	16.86	16.81	16.87	16.38	—N/a	16.87	PB
8	Dong Bin	China	x	16.84	x	16.71	16.10	—N/a	16.84	SB
9	Cristian Nápoles	Cuba	x	x	16.70	did not advance			16.70	
10	Elvijs Misāns	Latvia	x	x	16.55	did not advance			16.55	SB
11	Max Heß	Germany	x	x	16.47	did not advance			16.47	
12	Momchil Karailiev	Bulgaria	16.03	16.14	x	did not advance			16.14	
13	Clive Pullen	Jamaica	x	16.13	x	did not advance			16.13	
14	Fabrizio Donato	Italy	15.96	x	x	did not advance			15.96	
15	Andy Díaz	Cuba	x	15.37	–	did not advance			15.37	SB

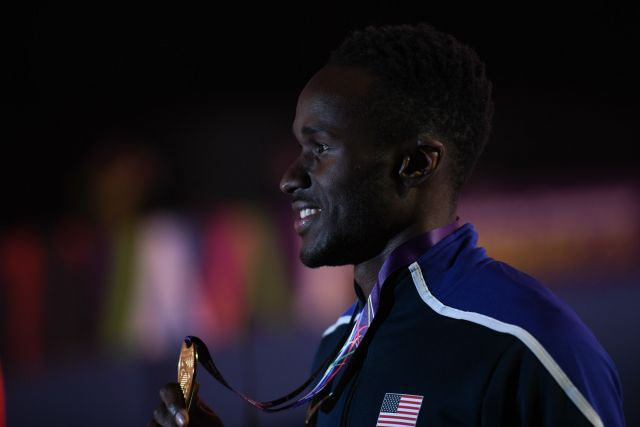
Gold medal winner, Will Claye
