= Praveen Chithravel =

Indian triple jumper (born 2001)

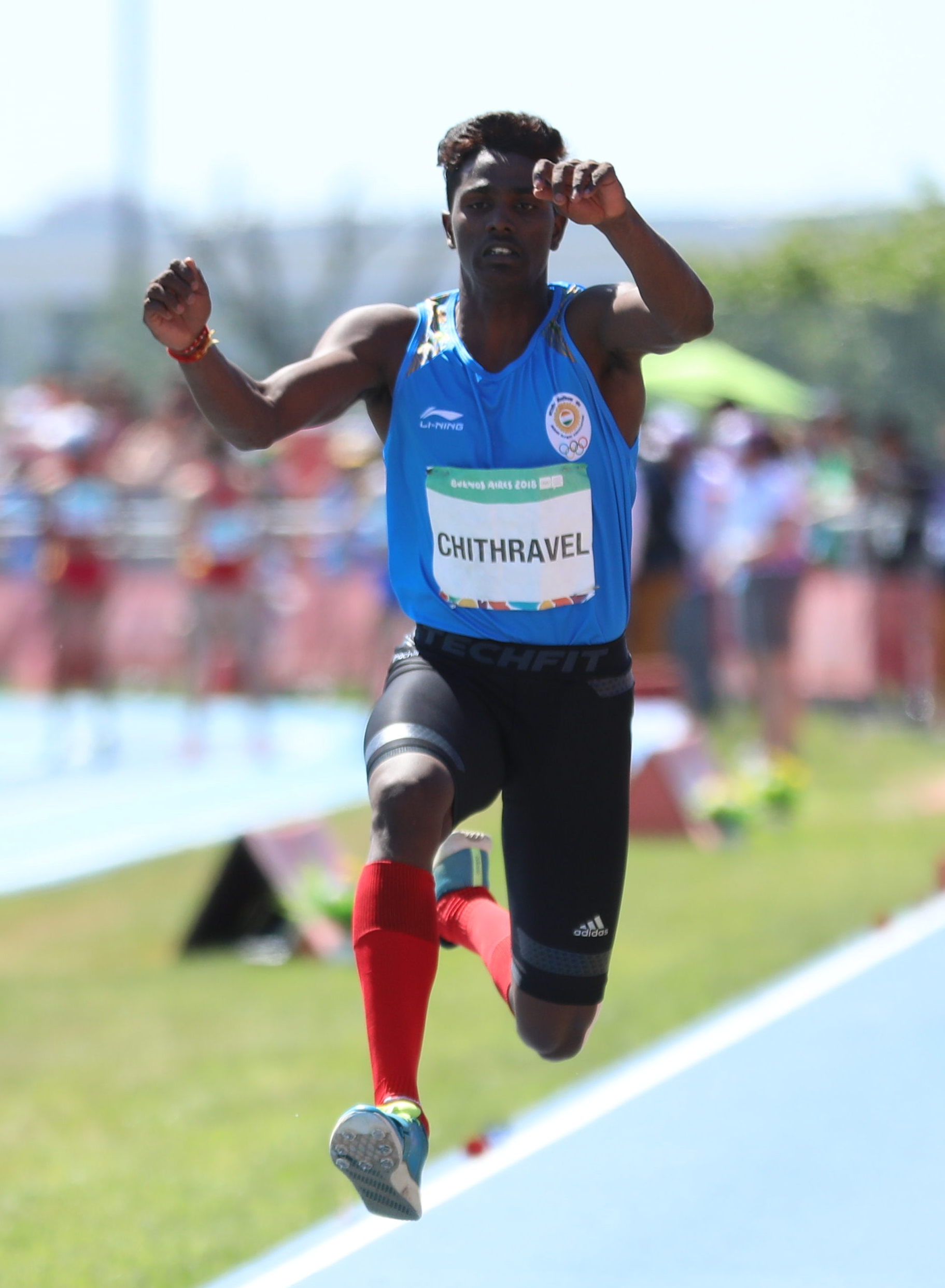
- Chithravel at the 2018 Youth Olympics

Personal information
- Born: 5 June 2001 (age 25) Tamil Nadu, India
- Education: Kalinga Institute of Industrial Technology

Sport
- Sport: Athletics
- Event: Triple jump
- Coached by: Yoandri Betanzos

Achievements and titles
- Personal bests: 17.37 m NR (2023)
Medal record
Men's athletics
Representing India
Asian Games
Bronze medal – third place	2022 Hangzhou	Triple jump
Asian Championships
Silver medal – second place	2025 Gumi	Triple jump
Asian Indoor Championships
Silver medal – second place	2023 Astana	Triple jump
Commonwealth Games
Silver medal – second place	2026 Glasgow	Triple jump
World University Games
Silver medal – second place	2025 Rhine-Ruhr	Triple jump
Youth Olympic Games
Bronze medal – third place	2018 Buenos Aires	Triple jump

Praveen Chithravel (born 5 June 2001) is an Indian triple jumper. He has represented India at multiple international events, earning a bronze medal at the 2022 Asian Games, as well as silver medals at the 2025 Asian Championships and the 2023 Asian Indoor Championships. Earlier in his career, he also secured a bronze medal at the 2018 Youth Olympic Games. Chithravel competed at the 2022 Commonwealth Games, where he narrowly missed the podium with a fourth-place finish in the men's triple jump final. He also competed for India at the 2024 Summer Olympics in the men's triple jump event.

== International competitions ==
Representing India
Year	Competition	Host	Position	Result
2018	Youth Olympic Games	Buenos Aires, Argentina	3rd	15.84 m
2019	Asian Championships	Doha, Qatar	–	
2019	World University Games	Naples, Italy	8th	15.96 m
2022	World Championships	Eugene, U.S.	17th (h)	16.49 m
2022	Commonwealth Games	Birmingham, England	4th	16.89 m
2023	Asian Indoor Championships	Astana, Kazakhstan	2nd	16.98 m
2023	World Championships	Budapest, Hungary	20th (h)	16.38 m
2023	Asian Games	Hangzhou, China	3rd	16.68 m
2024	World Indoor Championships	Glasgow, Scotland	11th	16.45 m
2024	Olympic Games	Paris, France	27th (h)	16.25 m
2025	Asian Championships	Gumi, South Korea	2nd	16.90 m
2025	World University Games	Bochum, Germany	2nd	16.66 m
2025	World Championships	Tokyo, Japan		16.74 m
2026	Asian Indoor Championships	Tianjin, China	4th	16.22 m
2026	Commonwealth Games	Glasgow, Scotland	2nd	16.58 m
