= Athletics at the 2025 Summer World University Games – Men's triple jump =

Men's triple jump at the 2025 Summer World University Games
- Venue: Lohrheidestadion
- Location: Bochum, Germany
- Dates: 25 July (qualification); 26 July (final)
- Competitors: 30 from 24 nations
- Winning distance: 16.77 m SB

Medalists
gold medal	Connor Murphy	Australia
silver medal	Praveen Chithravel	India
bronze medal	João Pedro de Azevedo	Brazil

The men's triple jump event at the 2025 Summer World University Games was held in Bochum, Germany, at Lohrheidestadion on 25 and 26 July.

== Records ==
Prior to the competition, the records were as follows:

Record	Athlete (nation)	Distance (m)	Location	Date
Games record	Charles Simpkins (USA)	17.86 m	Kobe, Japan	16 July 1985

== Results ==
=== Qualification ===
All athletes over 16.30 m (Q) or at least the 12 best performers (q) advance to the final.

==== Group A ====
Place	Athlete	Nation	#1	#2	#3	Result	Notes
1	Connor Murphy	Australia	16.25 m (−1.2 m/s)	16.12 (+0.3 m/s)	16.18 (+0.4 m/s)	16.25 m (−1.2 m/s)	q
2	Praveen Chithravel	India	16.25 m (−0.9 m/s)	-	-	16.25 m (−0.9 m/s)	q
3	Gor Howakimjan	Armenia	15.82 (−0.1 m/s)	16.04 m (+0.4 m/s)	15.92 (−0.1 m/s)	16.04 m (+0.4 m/s)	q
4	Daxx Turner	Canada	15.91 m (+0.3 m/s)	15.76 (+0.5 m/s)	x	15.91 m (+0.3 m/s)	q
5	Aaro Davidila	Finland	15.91 m (+0.1 m/s)	x	x	15.91 m (+0.1 m/s)	q
6	Enrico Montanari	Italy	x	x	15.86 m (−0.2 m/s)	15.86 m (−0.2 m/s)	q
7	Henrik Flåtnes	Norway	15.02 (+0.5 m/s)	15.45 (−1.1 m/s)	15.72 m (−0.7 m/s)	15.72 m (−0.7 m/s)	q
8	Thato Kgala	South Africa	13.62 (−0.5 m/s)	15.35 m (−1.0 m/s)	15.15 (+2.2 m/s)	15.35 m (−1.0 m/s)	
9	Donghyuk Kim	South Korea	x	x	15.29 m (+0.1 m/s)	15.29 m (+0.1 m/s)	
10	Gabriel Lee	Singapore	15.25 (−0.7 m/s)	15.26 m (−0.7 m/s)	14.97 (−0.8 m/s)	15.26 m (−0.7 m/s)	
11	Deshawn Lascelles	Great Britain	14.75 (+1.0 m/s)	14.63 (−0.8 m/s)	15.21 m (−0.1 m/s)	15.21 m (−0.1 m/s)	
12	Wei-Lin Huang	Chinese Taipei	14.75 (+0.3 m/s)	14.83 (+0.6 m/s)	14.87 m (+0.2 m/s)	14.87 m (+0.2 m/s)	
13	Churchill Ogenrwot	Uganda	14.29 m (−0.2 m/s)	14.00 (−0.1 m/s)	x	14.29 m (−0.2 m/s)	PB
14	Ali Hussein al Nasfan	Saudi Arabia	13.90 m (+1.2 m/s)	13.47 (+0.7 m/s)	-	13.90 m (+1.2 m/s)	
15	Alberto Zemba	Zambia	13.50 m (−0.3 m/s)	x	13.45 (−1.2 m/s)	13.50 m (−0.3 m/s)	

==== Group B ====
Place	Athlete	Nation	#1	#2	#3	Result	Notes
1	Vladyslav Shepeliev	Ukraine	x	16.45 m (+0.3 m/s)		16.45 m (+0.3 m/s)	Q
2	João Pedro de Azevedo	Brazil	x	15.73 (−0.1 m/s)	16.28 m (+0.3 m/s)	16.28 m (+0.3 m/s)	q, PB
3	Yuto Adachi	Japan	16.05 (−0.2 m/s)	16.09 m (+0.1 m/s)	-	16.09 m (+0.1 m/s)	q
4	Liam Glew	Australia	15.48 (+1.5 m/s)	15.79 (−1.1 m/s)	15.89 m (+0.7 m/s)	15.89 m (+0.7 m/s)	q
5	Li Yun-chen	Chinese Taipei	15.87 m (+0.7 m/s)	15.83 (−0.8 m/s)	-	15.87 m (+0.7 m/s)	q
6	Lauchlan Irish	Canada	15.51 (+0.5 m/s)	15.19 (+0.8 m/s)	15.69 m (+1.4 m/s)	15.69 m (+1.4 m/s)	PB
7	Sandis DzenÄ«tis	Latvia	15.31 (+0.3 m/s)	15.28 (−0.1 m/s)	15.68 m (+0.1 m/s)	15.68 m (+0.1 m/s)	
8	Razmik Ghazaryan	Armenia	15.55 (+1.6 m/s)	15.66 m (+0.3 m/s)	15.61 (+1.6 m/s)	15.66 m (+0.3 m/s)	
9	Ibrokhim Mahkamov	Uzbekistan	x	x	15.53 m (+0.2 m/s)	15.53 m (+0.2 m/s)	
10	Wojciech Galik	Poland	x	13.47 (+0.2 m/s)	15.50 m (+1.1 m/s)	15.50 m (+1.1 m/s)	
11	Zelimkhan Nassyrov	Kazakhstan	15.12 (+2.3 m/s)	15.44 m (−0.3 m/s)	15.30 (+1.4 m/s)	15.44 m (−0.3 m/s)	
12	Muhammad Izzul Mohd Rafli	Malaysia	14.76 (+0.3 m/s)	15.17 (+1.3 m/s)	15.43 m (+1.4 m/s)	15.43 m (+1.4 m/s)	
13	Andrew Medina	Singapore	x	14.54 m (+0.2 m/s)	-	14.54 m (+0.2 m/s)	
14	Zsombor IVán	Hungary	13.91 m (−1.1 m/s)	13.82 (+0.1 m/s)	13.65 (+0.9 m/s)	13.91 m (−1.1 m/s)	
—	Mohammed Muhassin	India	x	x	x	NM	

=== Final ===
Place	Athlete	Nation	#1	#2	#3	#4	#5	#6	Result	Notes
1st place, gold medalist(s)	Connor Murphy	Australia	16.37 (−0.5 m/s)	16.67 (+2.9 m/s)	16.47 (+0.7 m/s)	16.77 (+1.2 m/s)	16.65 (−0.3 m/s)	16.41 (+0.8 m/s)	16.77 m (+1.2 m/s)	SB
2nd place, silver medalist(s)	Praveen Chithravel	India	16.62 (+0.8 m/s)	16.66 (+1.8 m/s)	16.28 (+1.1 m/s)	x	x	x	16.66 m (+1.8 m/s)	
3rd place, bronze medalist(s)	João Pedro de Azevedo	Brazil	16.25 (+0.9 m/s)	16.35 (+1.5 m/s)	13.38 (+1.3 m/s)	15.68 (+1.6 m/s)	15.41 (+0.2 m/s)	x	16.35 m (+1.5 m/s)	PB
4	Li Yun-chen	Chinese Taipei	16.24 (+0.1 m/s)	15.93 (+4.0 m/s)	16.20 (+1.2 m/s)	16.28 (−0.5 m/s)	14.13 (+1.5 m/s)	16.00 (+1.8 m/s)	16.28 m (−0.5 m/s)	SB
5	Vladyslav Shepeliev	Ukraine	16.21 (+2.6 m/s)	x	15.65 (−1.4 m/s)	-	x	x	16.21 m (+2.6 m/s)	
6	Gor Howakimjan	Armenia	15.98 (−1.0 m/s)	x	16.17 (+1.1 m/s)	16.15 (+1.4 m/s)	15.76 (−0.2 m/s)	x	16.17 m (+1.1 m/s)	
7	Yuto Adachi	Japan	16.16 (+1.3 m/s)	x	x	x	x	15.87 (+1.9 m/s)	16.16 m (+1.3 m/s)	
8	Henrik Flåtnes	Norway	15.31 (+1.2 m/s)	14.66 (+0.9 m/s)	15.73 (+0.8 m/s)	-	15.18 (−0.2 m/s)	15.46 (+1.2 m/s)	15.73 m (+0.8 m/s)	
9	Daxx Turner	Canada	15.66 (+0.1 m/s)	15.15 (+0.8 m/s)	15.68 (+0.5 m/s)				15.68 m (+0.5 m/s)	
—	Aaro Davidila	Finland	x	x	x				NM	
—	Liam Glew	Australia	x	x	x				NM	
