= Athletics at the 2022 Commonwealth Games – Men's triple jump =

Men's triple jump at the 2022 Commonwealth Games
- Venue: Alexander Stadium
- Dates: 7 August
- Competitors: 14 from 12 nations
- Winning distance: 17.03

Medalists
gold medal	Eldhose Paul	India
silver medal	Abdulla Aboobacker	India
bronze medal	Jah-Nhai Perinchief	Bermuda

The men's triple jump at the 2022 Commonwealth Games, as part of the athletics programme, took place in the Alexander Stadium on 7 August 2022.

The winning margin was 1 cm, the narrowest winning margin in this event at these games.

== Records ==
Prior to this competition, the existing world and Games records were as follows:

World record	Jonathan Edwards (GBR)	18.29 m	Gothenburg, Sweden	7 August 1995
Commonwealth record	Jonathan Edwards (GBR)	18.29 m	Gothenburg, Sweden	7 August 1995
Games record	Jonathan Edwards (ENG)	17.86 m	Manchester, England	28 July 2002

== Schedule ==
The schedule was as follows:

Date	Time	Round
Sunday 7 August 2022	10:15	Final

All times are British Summer Time (UTC+1)

== Results ==
=== Final ===
The medals were determined in the final.

Rank	Name	#1	#2	#3	#4	#5	#6	Result	Notes
1st place, gold medalist(s)	Eldhose Paul (IND)	14.62	16.30	17.03 w	16.43	16.63	16.11	17.03 w	
2nd place, silver medalist(s)	Abdulla Aboobacker (IND)	16.57	16.62	16.71	16.70 w	17.02	16.88	17.02	
3rd place, bronze medalist(s)	Jah-Nhai Perinchief (BER)	16.92	16.55	16.67	15.76	16.75	16.42	16.92	
4	Praveen Chithravel (IND)	16.75	16.45	16.89	16.68	16.85 w	16.28	16.89	
5	Jordon Scott (JAM)	15.37	x	16.11	x	x	16.04	16.11	
6	Nathan Crawford-Wallis (BAR)	15.69	x	16.11	x	x	15.41	16.11	=PB
7	Kaiwan Culmer (BAH)	16.04	x	15.12	x	x	x	16.04	
8	Ben Williams (ENG)	16.03	x	x	x	x	x	16.03	
9	Kelsey Daniel (TTO)	15.93	15.95	15.72				15.95	
10	Julian Konle (AUS)	15.90	x	x				15.90	
11	Taeco O'Garro (ANT)	15.64	15.68w	15.41				15.68 w	
12	Elstrom Wanemut (VAN)	x	12.84	13.10				13.10	
	Andre Anura (MAS)	x	x	x				NM	
	Peniel Richard (PNG)	x	x	x				NM	
