= Jean-Marc Pontvianne =

French triple jumper (born 1994)

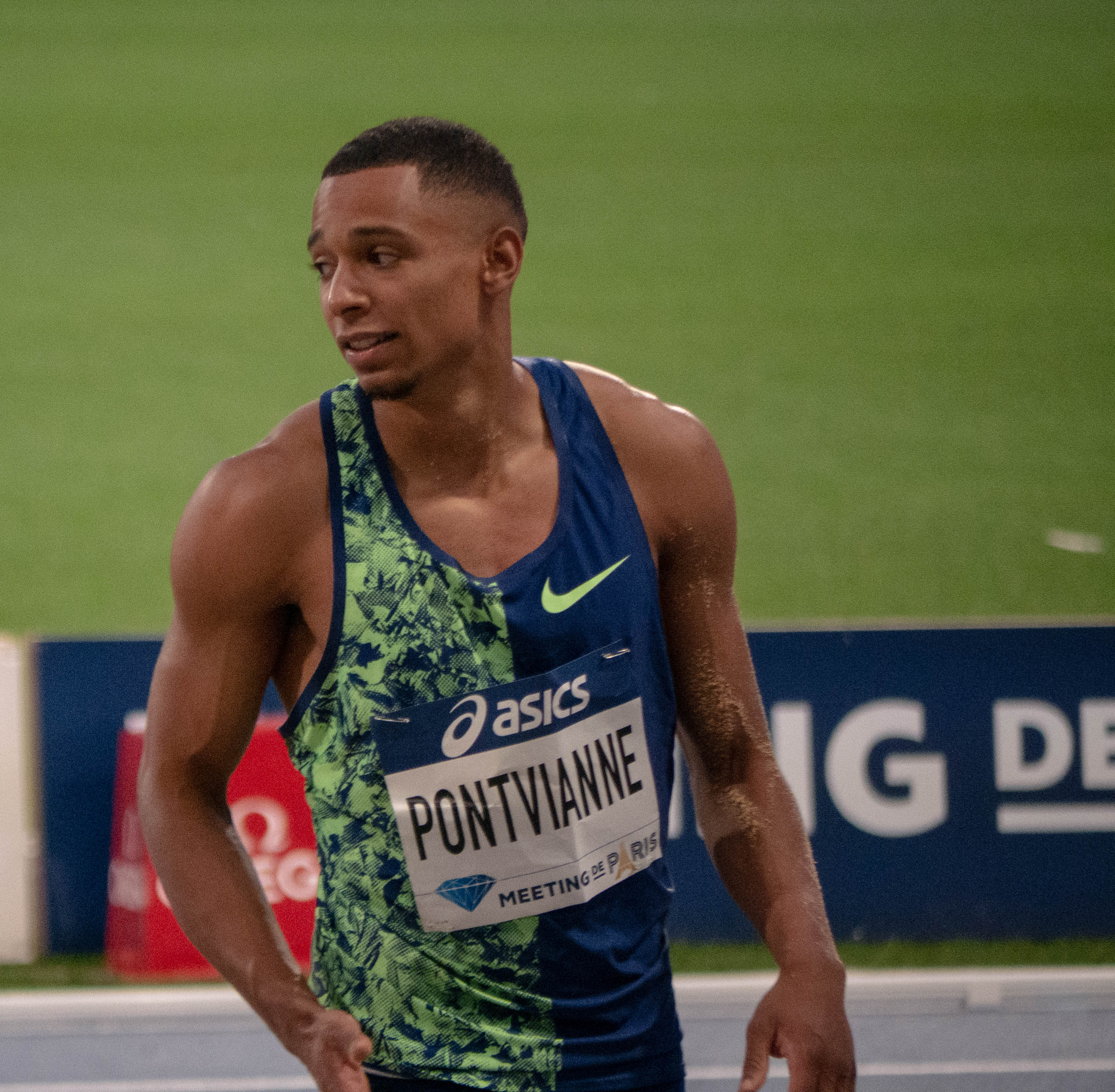
- Pontvianne in 2019

Personal information
- Born: 6 August 1994 (age 32) Nîmes, France
- Height: 1.70 m (5 ft 7 in)
- Weight: 68 kg (150 lb)

Sport
- Sport: Athletics
- Event: Triple jump
- Club: Entente Nîmes Athlétisme
- Coached by: Sébastien Bouschet
Medal record
Men's athletics
Representing France
European Championships
Bronze medal – third place	2022 Munich	Triple jump

Jean-Marc Pontvianne (born 6 August 1994 in Nîmes) is a French athlete specialising in the triple jump. He represented his country at the 2017 World Championships finishing eighth in the final.

His personal bests in the event are 17.20 metres outdoors (+2.0 m/s, Amiens 2020) and 17.13 metres indoors (Bordeaux 2017).

== International competitions ==
Year	Competition	Venue	Position	Event	Notes
Representing France
2013	European Junior Championships	Rieti, Italy	16th (q)	Triple jump	14.94 m
2014	Mediterranean U23 Championships	Aubagne, France	3rd	Triple jump	16.09 m
2015	European U23 Championships	Tallinn, Estonia	13th (q)	Triple jump	15.86 m
2017	European Indoor Championships	Belgrade, Serbia	6th	Triple jump	16.90 m
2017	World Championships	London, United Kingdom	8th	Triple jump	16.79 m
2018	European Championships	Berlin, Germany	7th	Triple jump	16.61 m
2019	World Championships	Doha, Qatar	26th (q)	Triple jump	16.31 m
2021	Olympic Games	Tokyo, Japan	–	Triple jump	NM
2022	World Indoor Championships	Belgrade, Serbia	7th	Triple jump	16.62 m
2022	World Championships	Eugene, United States	8th	Triple jump	16.86 m
2022	European Championships	Munich, Germany	3rd	Triple jump	16.94 m
2023	World Championships	Budapest, Hungary	14th (q)	Triple jump	16.64 m
2024	European Championships	Rome, Italy	5th	Triple jump	17.04 m
2024	Olympic Games	Paris, France	13th (q)	Triple jump	16.79 m
