= Chris Benard =

American track and field athlete

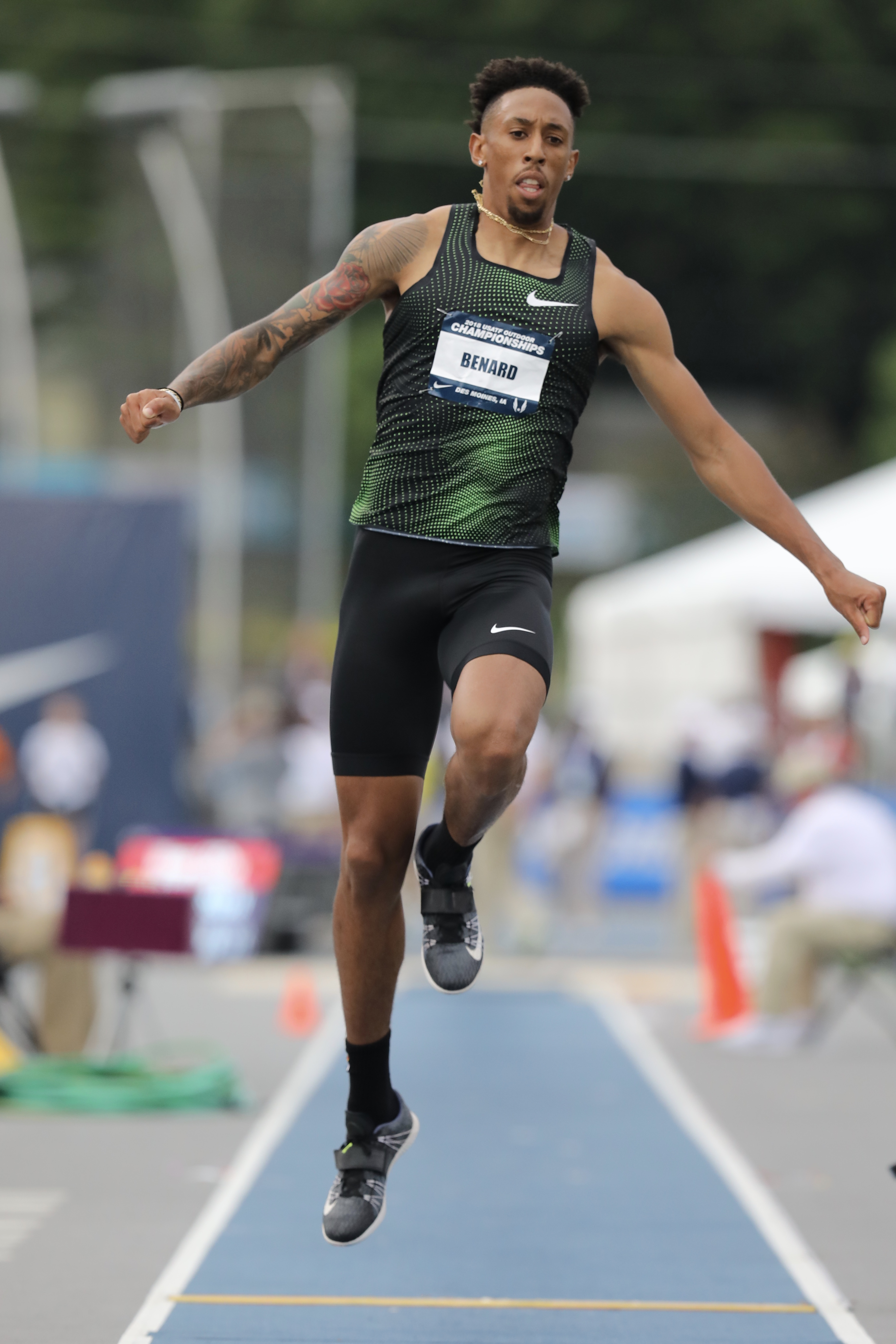
- Benard at the 2018 USA Outdoor Track and Field Championships

Personal information
- Born: April 4, 1990 (age 36) Tustin, California, U.S.
- Height: 1.91 m (6 ft 3 in)

Sport
- Sport: Track and field
- Event: Triple jump
- College team: Arizona State Sun Devils; Riverside College
- Turned pro: 2013
- Coached by: Jeremy Fischer

Achievements and titles
- Personal best: Triple jump: 17.48 m (57 ft 4 in)
Medal record
Men's athletics
Representing the United States
NACAC Championships
Gold medal – first place	Freeport, Bahamas	Triple Jump
Silver medal – second place	Toronto, Canada	Triple Jump
NACAC U23 Championships
Silver medal – second place	Irapuato, Mexico	Triple Jump

Chris Benard (born April 4, 1990) is an American track and field athlete who competes in the triple jump. He holds a personal record of 17.48 m (57 ft 4 in), set in 2016. Bernard represented Team USA 9-times at 2 Summer Olympics, 4 World Athletics Championships, & 3 NACAC Championships.

== Professional ==
Benard made his international debut for his country at the 2012 NACAC Under-23 Championships in Athletics. There, he took the silver medal.

Year	Competition	Venue	Position	Event	Notes
Representing United States
2012	NACAC U23 Championships	Irapuato, Mexico	2nd	Triple jump	15.90 m (52 ft 1 3/4 in)
2016	Olympic Games	Rio de Janeiro, Brazil	16th (q)	Triple jump	16.55 m (54 ft 3 1/2 in)
2016	World Indoor Championships	Portland, United States	11th	Triple jump	16.15 m (52 ft 11 3/4 in)
2017	World Championships	London, Great Britain	6th	Triple jump	17.16 m (56 ft 3 1/2 in)
2018	NACAC Championships	Toronto, Canada	2nd	Triple jump	16.73 m (54 ft 10 1/2 in)
2021	Olympic Games	Tokyo, Japan	18th (q)	Triple jump	16.59 m (54 ft 5 in)
2022	World Championships	Eugene, United States	16th (q)	Triple jump	16.53 m (54 ft 2 3/4 in)
2022	NACAC Championships	Freeport, Bahamas	1st	Triple jump	16.40 m (53 ft 9 1/2 in)
2023	World Championships	Budapest, Hungary	9th	Triple jump	16.62 m (54 ft 6 1/4 in)
2024	World Indoor Championships	Glasgow, United Kingdom	12th	Triple jump	16.14 m (52 ft 11 1/4 in)

== Personal records ==
Outdoor

- Triple jump – 17.48 m (57 ft 4 in)(Wind: -0.0 m/s) (2017)
- Long jump – 7.96 m (26 ft 1 1/4 in)(Wind: +1.6 m/s) (2014)

Indoor

- Triple jump – 17.02 m (55 ft 10 in) (2020)
- Long jump – 8.10 m (26 ft 6 3/4 in) (2014)
- 60-meter dash – 7.05 seconds (2015)

All information from IAAF

== US Track and field Championships ==
At the 2019 USA Outdoor Track and Field Championships, Benard placed fourth in the triple jump turned into a tough competition with winner Donald Scott who won on his first jump in wet conditions.

At the 2018 IAAF Diamond League Final Memorial Van Damme in Brussels, Belgium Benard placed fifth in the triple jump after jumping 16.81 m (55 ft 1 3/4 in).

At the 2018 USA Outdoor Track and Field Championships Benard placed second in the triple jump turned into a tough competition with winner Donald Scott who won on his last jump.

At the 2018 USA Indoor Track and Field Championships Benard moved from 7th to 4th in the last jump of the triple jump.

At the 2017 USA Outdoor Track and Field Championships Benard was again in the top three of the triple jump.

At the start of 2016 he took third at the USA Indoor Championships. This earned Benard his global debut for the United States, as he was entered into the 2016 IAAF World Indoor Championships and finished eleventh. He repeated his same position nationally at the 2016 United States Olympic Trials, achieving a personal record of 17.21 m (56 ft 5 1/2 in) to earn his first selection for the United States Olympic team.

At the 2015 USA Indoor Track and Field Championships he was again in the top three of both horizontal jumps. He was short of seventeen metres at the 2015 USA Outdoor Championships and beaten into fourth place (Marquis Dendy took the final spot on the team for the 2015 World Championships in Athletics).

Bernard took second place in both the long jump and triple jump at the 2014 USA Indoor Track and Field Championships, which included a long jump lifetime best of 8.10 m (26 ft 6 3/4 in) in qualifying. At the 2014 USA Outdoor Track and Field Championships he set another best, this time in the triple jump with a mark of 17.10 m (56 ft 1 in) – his first beyond seventeen metres. That brought him third place behind the top two at the last Olympics, Christian Taylor and Will Claye.

Year	Competition	Venue	Position	Event	Notes
2023	USA Outdoor Track and Field Championships	Eugene, Oregon	3rd	Triple jump	16.68 m (54 ft 9 in) (Wind: +0.2 m/s)
2022	USA Outdoor Track and Field Championships	Eugene, Oregon	3rd	Triple jump	16.83 m (55 ft 3 in) (Wind: +1.2 m/s)
2022	USA Indoor Track and Field Championships	Spokane, Washington	4th	Triple jump	16.49 m (54 ft 1 in)
2021	USA Olympic Trials	Eugene, Oregon	3rd	Triple jump	17.01 m (55 ft 10 in)
2019	USA Outdoor Track and Field Championships	Des Moines, Iowa	4th	Triple jump	17.33 m (56 ft 10 in) (Wind: +2.5 m/s)
2018	USA Outdoor Track and Field Championships	Des Moines, Iowa	2nd	Triple jump	17.32 m (56 ft 10 in) (Wind: -0.9 m/s)
2018	USA Indoor Track and Field Championships	Albuquerque, New Mexico	4th	Triple jump	16.93 m (55 ft 7 in)
2017	USA Outdoor Track and Field Championships	Sacramento, California	2nd	Triple jump	17.48 m (57 ft 4 in) (Wind: -0.0 m/s)
2016	USA Olympic Trials	Eugene, Oregon	3rd	Triple jump	17.21 m (56 ft 6 in) (Wind: -0.9 m/s)
2016	USA Indoor Track and Field Championships	Portland, Oregon	3rd	Triple jump	16.93 m (55 ft 7 in)
2015	US Outdoor Track and Field Championships	University of Oregon	4th	Triple jump	16.95 m (55 ft 7 in) (Wind: +1.0 m/s)
2015	USA Indoor Track and Field Championships	Boston, Massachusetts	2nd	Triple jump	16.57 m (54 ft 4 in)
2015	USA Indoor Track and Field Championships	Boston, Massachusetts	3rd	Long jump	7.48 m (24 ft 6 in)
2014	USA Outdoor Track and Field Championships	California State University, Sacramento	3rd	Triple jump	17.10 m (56 ft 1 in)
2014	USA Outdoor Track and Field Championships	California State University, Sacramento	10th	Long jump	7.60 m (24 ft 11 in)
2014	USA Indoor Track and Field Championships	Albuquerque, New Mexico	2nd	Triple jump	16.99 m (55 ft 9 in)
2014	USA Indoor Track and Field Championships	Albuquerque, New Mexico	2nd	Long jump	8.08 m (26 ft 6 in)
2013	USA Outdoor Track and Field Championships	Des Moines, Iowa	7th	Triple jump	16.77 m (55 ft 0 in) (Wind: +2.1 m/s)
2012	USA Olympic Trials	Eugene, Oregon	11th	Triple jump	16.00 m (52 ft 6 in) (Wind: -0.2 m/s)

== Personal biography ==
Born to Fay and Thomas Benard in Tustin, California, he grew up in nearby Corona and attended Santiago High School.

== NCAA ==
Benard earned his place among America's top triple jumpers after graduation from Arizona State University. Bernard earned eight All-American as a college student-athlete. He gained an athletic scholarship to attended Arizona State University and competed for the Arizona State Sun Devils track team.

In his last appearance at NCAA level, Benard placed tenth overall at the 2013 NCAA Indoor meet.

Benard competed well at NCAA taking the runner-up spot at the 2012 NCAA Men's Division I Indoor Track and Field Championships.

Benard competed well at NCAA level, coming 19th in his debut at the 2011 NCAA Men's Division I Outdoor Track and Field Championships.

Competing for Riverside City College, Bernard earned two All-American awards in 2010 from National Junior College Athletic Association.

Benard won the 2009 community college edition Mt SAC Relays as a freshman in a then personal best in the triple jump with a jump of 14.95 m (49 ft 1 in) to place first.

Arizona State	Mountain Pacific Sports Federation Indoor track and field Championships	NCAA Indoor track and field Championships	Pac-12 Conference Outdoor Track and Field Championships	NCAA Outdoor Track and Field Championships
R-Senior 12-13	Long Jump: 7.63 m (25 ft 0 in) 2nd			
R-Senior 12-13	Triple Jump: 16.14 m (52 ft 11 in) 1st	Triple Jump:15.76 m (51 ft 8 in) 10th		
R-Junior 11-12	Long Jump: 7.64 m (25 ft 1 in) 1st		Long Jump: 7.62 m (25 ft 0 in) 7th	Long Jump: 7.39 m (24 ft 3 in) 16th
R-Junior 11-12	Triple Jump: 16.43 m (53 ft 11 in) 2nd	Triple Jump: 16.50 m (54 ft 2 in) 2nd	Triple Jump: 16.42 m (53 ft 10 in) 1st	Triple Jump: 16.36 m (53 ft 8 in) 7th
R-Sophomore 10-11	Long Jump: 7.20 m (23 ft 7 in) 8th		Long Jump: 7.43 m (24 ft 5 in) 4th	DNS
R-Sophomore 10-11			Triple Jump: 15.63 m (51 ft 3 in) 4th	Triple Jump: 15.39 m (50 ft 6 in) 19th
Riverside	Indoor track and field	-	Orange Empire Conference Outdoor Track and Field Championships	CCCAA Outdoor Track and Field Championships
Sophomore 09-10			Long Jump: 7.35 m (24 ft 1 in) 5th	Long Jump: 7.77 m (25 ft 6 in) 1st
Sophomore 09-10			Triple Jump: 15.49 m (50 ft 10 in) 1st	Triple Jump: 16.21 m (53 ft 2 in) 1st
Freshman 08-09				Triple Jump: 14.01 m (46 ft 0 in) 9th
