= 2016 IAAF World U20 Championships – Men's triple jump =

The men's triple jump event at the 2016 IAAF World U20 Championships was held at Zdzisław Krzyszkowiak Stadium on 20 and 21 July.

== Medalists ==
Gold	Lázaro Martínez; Cuba
Silver	Cristian Nápoles; Cuba
Bronze	Melvin Raffin; France

== Records ==
Standing records prior to the 2016 IAAF World U20 Championships in Athletics
World Junior Record	Volker Mai (GDR)	17.50	Erfurt, East Germany	23 June 1985
Championship Record	Lázaro Martínez (CUB)	17.13	Eugene, United States	27 July 2014
World Junior Leading	Cristian Nápoles (CUB)	16.92	Havana, Cuba	17 June 2016

== Results ==
=== Qualification ===
Qualification: 16.10 (Q) or at least 12 best performers (q) qualified for the final.

Rank	Group	Name	Nationality	#1	#2	#3	Result	Note
1	A	Cristian Nápoles	Cuba	16.53			16.53	Q
2	B	Lázaro Martínez	Cuba	16.49			16.49	Q
3	A	Melvin Raffin	France	x	16.05	16.20	16.20	Q
4	B	Philipp Kronsteiner	Austria	15.56	16.19		16.19	Q, NU20R
5	A	Armani Wallace	United States	x	15.49	16.04	16.04	q
6	B	Jordan Scott	Jamaica	x	15.91	15.99	15.99	q
7	B	Charles Brown Jr.	United States	15.71	15.55	15.97	15.97	q
8	B	Miguel van Assen	Suriname	15.86	15.78	15.92	15.92	q
9	A	Sung Jin-suok	South Korea	15.76	15.71	15.91	15.91	q
10	A	Du Mingze	China	15.90	15.51	15.71	15.90	q
11	A	Pavlo Beznis	Ukraine	14.75	15.87	15.48	15.87	q
12	B	Liu Mingxuan	China	15.27	15.80	15.26	15.80	q
13	B	Oleksandr Malosilov	Ukraine	15.39	15.63	15.78	15.78	
14	A	Tobia Bocchi	Italy	15.68	15.74	15.41	15.74	
15	B	Nazim Babayev	Azerbaijan	15.74	x	15.56	15.74	
16	A	Christoph Garritsen	Germany	15.17	15.61	15.73	15.73	
17	B	Mutsuki Harada	Japan	15.25	14.20	15.70	15.70	
18	B	Alejandro Matantu	Spain	14.55	15.69	15.46w	15.69	
19	B	Murillo Santos	Brazil	15.64	x	15.15	15.64	PB
20	A	Julian Konle	Australia	x	x	15.60	15.60	
21	B	Jordan Caraman	France	x	15.58	15.51	15.58	
22	B	Goga Maglakelidze	Georgia	14.73	15.44	x	15.44	
23	A	Javier Lowe	Jamaica	14.64	15.21	15.38	15.38	
24	B	Mert Çiçek	Turkey	15.29	14.98	x	15.29	
25	B	Benjamin Bauer	Germany	15.25	15.09	x	15.25	
26	B	Chamal Waduge	Sri Lanka	x	x	15.22	15.22	
27	A	Oleksandr Lyashchenko	Portugal	15.13	x	15.11	15.13	
28	B	Fabio Camattari	Italy	14.63	14.75	15.03	15.03	
29	A	Necati Er	Turkey	x	15.01	15.02	15.02	
30	A	Sonu Kumar	India	14.73	14.51	x	14.73	
31	A	Shreshan Dhananjaya Liyanapedige	Sri Lanka	13.71	14.30	14.38	14.38	
32	A	Holland Martin	Bahamas	x	x	14.35	14.35	
33	A	Chakkrit Panthasa	Thailand	x	13.73	x	13.73	
	A	Kristóf Pap	Hungary	x	x	x	NM	
	B	Nam Su-hwan	South Korea	x	x	x	NM	
	B	Nikolaos Andrikopoulos	Greece	x	x	x	NM	
	A	Hesham Eldesouky	Egypt				DNS	
	A	Fabian Ime Edoki	Nigeria				DNS	

=== Final ===
Rank	Name	Nationality	#1	#2	#3	#4	Result	Note
1st place, gold medalist(s)	Lázaro Martínez	Cuba	16.59	16.07	17.06	x	17.06	WU20L
2nd place, silver medalist(s)	Cristian Nápoles	Cuba	16.50	14.78	16.41	16.62	16.62	
3rd place, bronze medalist(s)	Melvin Raffin	France	16.37	x	16.30	15.81	16.37	
4	Philipp Kronsteiner	Austria	16.11	16.20	16.25	16.10	16.25	NU20R
5	Sung Jin-suok	South Korea	15.87	15.71	16.11	16.09	16.11	
6	Jordan Scott	Jamaica	15.56	15.16	16.01	15.69	16.01	PB
7	Liu Mingxuan	China	16.01	15.50	15.50		16.01	
8	Miguel van Assen	Suriname	15.75	14.63	15.70		15.75	
9	Pavlo Beznis	Ukraine	15.59	15.45	15.70		15.70	
10	Charles Brown Jr.	United States	15.60	15.57	x		15.60	
11	Du Mingze	China	15.41	15.06	x		15.41	
12	Armani Wallace	United States	x	15.10	x		15.10	
