= Athletics at the 2020 Summer Olympics – Men's triple jump =

Men's triple jump at the Games of the XXXII Olympiad
- Olympic Athletics
- Venue: Japan National Stadium
- Dates: 3 August 2021 (qualifying); 5 August 2021 (final)
- Competitors: 31 from 19 nations
- Winning distance: 17.98

Medalists
1st place, gold medalist(s)		Pedro Pichardo	Portugal
2nd place, silver medalist(s)		Zhu Yaming	China
3rd place, bronze medalist(s)		Hugues Fabrice Zango	Burkina Faso

Official Video Highlights

The men's triple jump event at the 2020 Summer Olympics took place between 3 and 5 August 2021 at the Japan National Stadium. Approximately 35 athletes were expected to compete; the exact number was dependent on how many nations use universality places to enter athletes in addition to the 32 qualifying through time or ranking (2 universality places were used in 2016). 32 athletes from 19 nations competed. Pedro Pichardo of Portugal won the gold medal, the nation's second victory in the men's triple jump (after Nelson Évora in 2008). China's Zhu Yaming took silver, while Hugues Fabrice Zango earned Burkina Faso's first Olympic medal in any event.

== Summary ==
Defending champion Christian Taylor (the #2 jumper of all time) did not participate due to injury, nor did 2016 bronze medalist Dong Bin. However, the field returned the 2016 silver medalist Will Claye (#3 of all time), Pedro Pichardo (#5 of all time), and Hugues Fabrice Zango, who had set the indoor world record 4 months prior. All had jumped over 18 metres. Taylor and Claye had also achieved gold and silver at the most recent World Championships, with Zango as the bronze medalist. Since the previous Olympics in April 2018, Pichardo had defected from Cuba and was now jumping for Portugal.

Four athletes managed to exceed 17 metres in the first round. Claye was first down the runway with a 17.19m. Five jumpers later, Pichardo established himself as the leader with 17.61m, Donald Scott moved onto the podium with a 17.15m, and Yasser Triki moved into second at 17.30m, breaking his own Algerian national record. Of the jumpers with a legal first attempt, Zango found himself in dead last place with at 15.91m. Leading off the second round, Claye landed his feet somewhere close to Pichardo's mark but dropped his elbow further back. He turned around to find that effort was a foul. A couple of jumps later, Zhu Yaming landed in the same area for 17.41m, to move into second place. Pichardo duplicated his 17.61m and Triki produced a second national record 17.42m to take back his position. With a 16.83m, Zango improved but still found himself in 9th place, in danger of being eliminated before the final three jumps.

Claye led off the third round with a 17.44m to move back into a podium position. Pichardo expanded his lead with a Portuguese national record 17.98 m (58 ft 11 3/4 in). Knowing he had hit a big one (equalling the #17 jump of all time), Pichardo posed and held up a fist while still lying in the pit. Under pressure, Zango gritted his teeth and pounded out a 17.47m bursting the bubble and moving into second place.

Nobody was able to improve through the finals except in the fifth round when Zhu jumped 17.57m to put himself into the silver medal. Triki's third national record of the competition, 17.43m couldn't move him back to the podium.

== Background ==
This was the 29th appearance of the event, which is one of 12 athletics events to have been held at every Summer Olympics.

No nations made their men's triple jump debut. The United States competed for the 28th time, having missed only the boycotted 1980 Games.

== Qualification ==
A National Olympic Committee (NOC) could enter up to 3 qualified athletes in the men's triple jump event if all athletes meet the entry standard or qualify by ranking during the qualifying period. (The limit of 3 has been in place since the 1930 Olympic Congress.) The qualifying standard is 17.14 metres. This standard was "set for the sole purpose of qualifying athletes with exceptional performances unable to qualify through the IAAF World Rankings pathway." The world rankings, based on the average of the best five results for the athlete over the qualifying period and weighted by the importance of the meet, will then be used to qualify athletes until the cap of 32 is reached.

The qualifying period was originally from 1 May 2019 to 29 June 2020. Due to the COVID-19 pandemic, the period was suspended from 6 April 2020 to 30 November 2020, with the end date extended to 29 June 2021. The world rankings period start date was also changed from 1 May 2019 to 30 June 2020; athletes who had met the qualifying standard during that time were still qualified, but those using world rankings would not be able to count performances during that time. The qualifying time standards could be obtained in various meets during the given period that have the approval of the IAAF. Both outdoor and indoor meets are eligible. The most recent Area Championships may be counted in the ranking, even if not during the qualifying period.

NOCs can also use their universality place—each NOC can enter one male athlete regardless of time if they had no male athletes meeting the entry standard for an athletics event—in the triple jump.

Entry number: 32.

Qualification standard	No. of athletes	Nation	Nominated athletes
Entry standard – 17.14	3	China	Fang Yaoqing; Wu Ruiting; Zhu Yaming
Entry standard – 17.14	2	Cuba	Andy Díaz; ~~Jordan Díaz~~; Cristian Nápoles
Entry standard – 17.14	3	Italy	Tobia Bocchi; Emmanuel Ihemeje; Andrea Dallavalle
Entry standard – 17.14	3	United States	Chris Benard; Will Claye; Donald Scott
Entry standard – 17.14	3	Brazil	Almir dos Santos; Alexsandro Melo; Mateus de Sá
Entry standard – 17.14	2	France	Jean-Marc Pontvianne; Melvin Raffin
Entry standard – 17.14	1	Algeria	Yasser Triki
Entry standard – 17.14	1	Armenia	Levon Aghasyan
Entry standard – 17.14	1	Azerbaijan	Nazim Babayev
Entry standard – 17.14	1	Burkina Faso	Hugues Fabrice Zango
Entry standard – 17.14	1	Georgia	Lasha Gulelauri
Entry standard – 17.14	1	Great Britain	Ben Williams
Entry standard – 17.14	1	Jamaica	Carey McLeod
Entry standard – 17.14	1	Portugal	Pedro Pichardo
Entry standard – 17.14	1	~~ROC~~	~~Dmitry Sorokin~~
Entry standard – 17.14	1	Spain	Pablo Torrijos
Entry standard – 17.14	1	Turkey	Necati Er
World ranking	2	Portugal	Nelson Évora; Tiago Pereira
World ranking	1	Brazil	Mateus de Sá
World ranking	1	France	Benjamin Compaoré
World ranking	1	Germany	Max Heß
World ranking	1	Greece	Dimitrios Tsiamis
World ranking	1	Uzbekistan	Ruslan Kurbanov
Total	32		

== Competition format ==
The 2020 competition continued to use the two-round format with divided final introduced in 1936. The qualifying round gave each competitor three jumps to achieve a qualifying distance (17.05 metres); if fewer than 12 men did so, the top 12 (including all those tied) would advance. The final provided each jumper with three jumps; the top eight jumpers received an additional three jumps for a total of six, with the best to count (qualifying round jumps were not considered for the final).

== Records ==
Prior to this competition, the existing world, Olympic, and area records were as follows.

World record	Jonathan Edwards (GBR)	18.29	Gothenburg, Sweden	7 August 1995
Olympic record	Kenny Harrison (USA)	18.09	Atlanta, United States	27 August 1996
World Leading	Hugues Fabrice Zango (BUR)	18.07 i	Aubière, France	16 January 2021

Area	Distance (m)	Wind	Athlete	Nation
Africa (records)	18.07 (i)		Hugues Fabrice Zango	Burkina Faso
Asia (records)	17.59	+0.0	Li Yanxi	China
Europe (records)	18.29 WR	+1.3	Jonathan Edwards	Great Britain
North, Central America and Caribbean (records)	18.21	+0.2	Christian Taylor	United States
Oceania (records)	17.46	+1.7	Ken Lorraway	Australia
South America (records)	17.90	+0.4	Jadel Gregório	Brazil

The following national records were set during this competition:

Country	Athlete	Round	Distance	Notes
Portugal	Pedro Pichardo	Final	17.98	
Algeria	Yasser Triki	Final	17.43	

== Schedule ==
All times are Japan Standard Time (UTC+9)

The men's triple jump took place over two separate days.

Date	Time	Round
Tuesday, 3 August 2021	9:00	Qualifying
Thursday, 5 August 2021	9:00	Final

== Results ==
=== Qualification ===
Qualification Rules: Qualifying performance 17.05 (Q) or at least 12 best performers (q) advance to the Final.

Rank	Group	Athlete	Nation	1	2	3	Distance	Notes
1	B	Pedro Pichardo	Portugal	16.98	17.71	—	17.71	Q
2	B	Necati Er	Turkey	x	16.70	17.13	17.13	Q, SB
3	A	Zhu Yaming	China	17.11	—	—	17.11	Q
4	A	Cristian Nápoles	Cuba	17.08	—	—	17.08	Q, SB
5	B	Yasser Triki	Algeria	16.75	16.67	17.05	17.05	Q
6	B	Donald Scott	United States	17.01	16.43	r	17.01	q
7	A	Andrea Dallavalle	Italy	16.99	16.59	—	16.99	q
8	A	Will Claye	United States	16.78	16.88	16.91	16.91	q
9	B	Emmanuel Ihemeje	Italy	16.88	x	16.28	16.88	q
10	B	Fang Yaoqing	China	16.79	16.69	16.84	16.84	q
11	B	Melvin Raffin	France	16.49	16.83	16.58	16.83	q
12	A	Hugues Fabrice Zango	Burkina Faso	16.83	16.46	16.37	16.83	q
13	A	Tobia Bocchi	Italy	16.78	16.67	15.45	16.78	
14	A	Wu Ruiting	China	x	16.73	16.10	16.73	
15	A	Nazim Babayev	Azerbaijan	16.38	16.30	16.72	16.72	SB
16	A	Tiago Pereira	Portugal	16.62	16.71	15.79	16.71	
17	B	Max Heß	Germany	13.79	16.69	x	16.69	
18	B	Chris Benard	United States	16.44	16.59	16.49	16.59	
19	B	Benjamin Compaoré	France	16.59	16.39	15.29	16.59	
20	A	Mateus de Sá	Brazil	16.49	x	16.33	16.49	
21	B	Levon Aghasyan	Armenia	x	16.42	x	16.42	
22	B	Ben Williams	Great Britain	x	16.30	x	16.30	
23	B	Almir dos Santos	Brazil	x	16.27	16.27	16.27	
24	A	Carey McLeod	Jamaica	15.82	16.01	x	16.01	
25	B	Pablo Torrijos	Spain	15.87	x	x	15.87	
26	A	Alexsandro Melo	Brazil	15.65	r	—	15.65	
27	A	Nelson Évora	Portugal	x	15.39	x	15.39	
	A	Lasha Gulelauri	Georgia	x	x	—	NM	
	A	Jean-Marc Pontvianne	France	x	x	x	NM	
	A	Ruslan Kurbanov	Uzbekistan	x	r	—	NM	
	B	Dimitrios Tsiamis	Greece	x	r	—	NM	
	B	Andy Díaz	Cuba	—	—	—	DNS	

=== Final ===
Rank	Athlete	Nation	1	2	3	4	5	6	Distance	Notes
1st place, gold medalist(s)	Pedro Pichardo	Portugal	17.61	17.61	17.98	x	—	x	17.98	NR
2nd place, silver medalist(s)	Zhu Yaming	China	16.63	17.41	17.11	17.16	17.57	15.02	17.57	PB
3rd place, bronze medalist(s)	Hugues Fabrice Zango	Burkina Faso	15.91	16.83	17.47	x	17.31	17.43	17.47	
4	Will Claye	United States	17.19	x	17.44	16.69	17.04	17.36	17.44	SB
5	Yasser Triki	Algeria	17.30	17.42	17.40	17.08	17.43	17.10	17.43	NR
6	Necati Er	Turkey	16.84	15.27	17.25	—	x	x	17.25	SB
7	Donald Scott	United States	17.15	x	16.86	17.18	16.79	16.95	17.18	=SB
8	Fang Yaoqing	China	16.95	16.52	16.53	17.01	14.60	15.94	17.01	
9	Andrea Dallavalle	Italy	16.62	16.85	16.74	Did not advance			16.85	
10	Cristian Nápoles	Cuba	x	16.63	x	Did not advance			16.63	
11	Emmanuel Ihemeje	Italy	x	16.52	16.04	Did not advance			16.52	
	Melvin Raffin	France	x	x	x	Did not advance			NM	
