= Lázaro Martínez (triple jumper) =

Cuban triple jumper

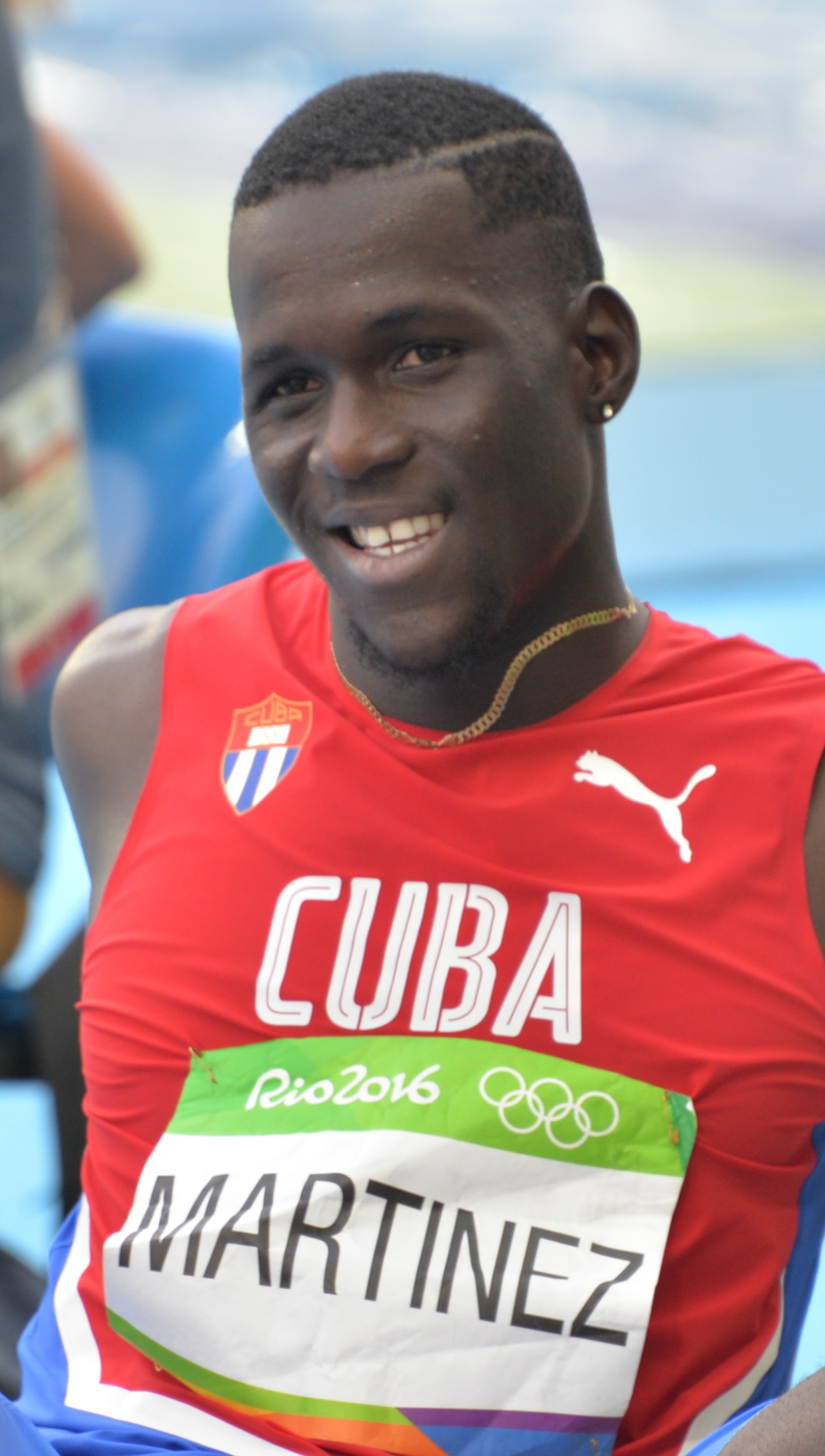
- Martínez at the 2016 Olympics

Personal information
- Full name: Lázaro Martínez Santray
- Born: 3 November 1997 (age 28) Guantanamo, Cuba
- Height: 1.92 m (6 ft 4 in)

Sport
- Country: Cuba
- Sport: Athletics
- Events: Triple jump, long jump

Achievements and titles
- Personal bests: Triple jump: 17.64 m i (Belgrade, 2022); Long jump: 7.19 m (Havana, 2014)
Medal record
Men's athletics
Representing Cuba
World Championships
Silver medal – second place	2023 Budapest	Triple jump
Bronze medal – third place	2025 Tokyo	Triple jump
World Indoor Championships
Gold medal – first place	2022 Belgrade	Triple jump
Pan American Games
Gold medal – first place	2023 Santiago	Triple jump
World Junior Championships
Gold medal – first place	2014 Oregon	Triple jump
Gold medal – first place	2016 Bydgoszcz	Triple jump
World Youth Championships
Gold medal – first place	2013 Donetsk	Triple jump
- Updated on 18 March 2022

Lázaro Martínez Santray (born 3 November 1997) is a Cuban athlete who specialises in the triple jump and the long jump. He is a former World Junior Championship record holder for the triple jump with an attempt of 17.13 m jumped at the 2014 edition in Eugene, Oregon, and also holds the former world youth best in the triple jump, with an attempt of 17.24 m jumped in Havana. Martínez won the silver medal at the 2023 World Championships in the triple jump event.

== Early life ==
Martínez was born to former 400 metres runner Isabel Contreras. He initially practised several sports, including basketball and judo, until he was about 10 years old. It was his mother who encouraged him to take up athletics and linked him up with a friend and coach.

Martínez has stated that he initially did not like athletics, but after doing a test with the said coach he was told he had the potential to enter the provincial sports school. He began specialising in the jumps under the supervision of coach Manuel Guilarte, whom he credits for instilling in him the love of athletics.

== Career ==
At the 2013 World Youth Championships in Donetsk, Martínez equalled the World Youth Championship record set by compatriot Héctor Dairo Fuentes in 2005 with an attempt of 16.63 m in the fourth round, earning him his first major gold medal.

Martínez's record-breaking continued into 2014, as he jumped a world youth best of 17.24 m in front of a home crowd in the Cuban capital Havana. He then broke the World Junior Championship record twice at the 2014 World Junior Championships in Eugene, Oregon, jumping 17.08 m with a 0.6 m/s headwind on his first attempt and 17.13 m with a 0.7 m/s headwind on his second attempt. He became the fourth Cuban world junior champion in the triple jump after Yoelbi Quesada in 1992, René Hernández in 1996, Arnie David Giralt in 2002 and Pedro Pablo Pichardo in 2012.

== Personal bests ==
Event	Result	Venue	Date
Outdoor
Triple jump	17.24 m (wind: +0.7 m/s)	Havana, Cuba	1 February 2014
Indoor
Triple jump	17.64 m	Belgrade, Serbia	18 March 2022

== Achievements ==
Year	Competition	Venue	Position	Event	Result
Representing Cuba
2013	World Youth Championships	Donetsk, Ukraine	1st	Triple jump	16.63 m (wind: +1.8 m/s)
2013	Pan American Junior Championships	Medellín, Colombia	1st	Triple jump	16.49 m (wind: +1.8 m/s) A
2014	World Junior Championships	Eugene, United States	1st	Triple jump	17.13 m (wind: +0.7 m/s)
2014	Pan American Sports Festival	Mexico City, Mexico	3rd	Triple jump	16.53 m A (wind: -0.1 m/s)
2014	Central American and Caribbean Games	Xalapa, Mexico	2nd	Triple jump	16.91 m A (wind: -0.6 m/s)
2016	World U20 Championships	Bydgoszcz, Poland	1st	Triple jump	17.06 m
2016	Olympic Games	Rio de Janeiro, Brazil	8th	Triple jump	16.68 m
2017	World Championships	London, United Kingdom	12th	Triple jump	16.25 m
2022	World Indoor Championships	Belgrade, Serbia	1st	Triple jump	17.64 m
2022	Ibero-American Championships	La Nucía, Spain	1st	Triple jump	17.30 m
2022	World Championships	Eugene, United States	5th (q)	Triple jump	17.06 m^{1}
2023	Central American and Caribbean Games	San Salvador, El Salvador	1st	Triple jump	17.51 m
2023	World Championships	Budapest, Hungary	2nd	Triple jump	17.41 m
2023	Pan American Games	Santiago, Chile	1st	Triple jump	17.19 m
2024	World Indoor Championships	Glasgow, United Kingdom	8th	Triple jump	16.69 m
2024	Olympic Games	Paris, France	8th	Triple jump	17.34 m
2025	World Indoor Championships	Nanjing, China	13th	Triple jump	14.04 m
2025	World Championships	Tokyo, Japan	3rd	Triple jump	17.49 m
2026	World Indoor Championships	Toruń, Poland	4th	Triple jump	17.14 m
2026	Central American and Caribbean Games	Santo Domingo, Dominican Republic	1st	Triple jump	16.76 m

^{1}No mark in the final

Records
Preceded by (China) Gu Junjie	World youth record holder – Boys' triple jump 1 February 2014 – 14 July 2017	Succeeded by (Cuba) Jordan Díaz
Preceded by (Cuba) Yoelbi Quesada	World Junior Championship record holder – Men's triple jump 27 July 2014 – 14 July 2018	Succeeded by (Cuba) Jordan Díaz
