= Connor Murphy (triple jumper) =

Australian athlete (born 2001)

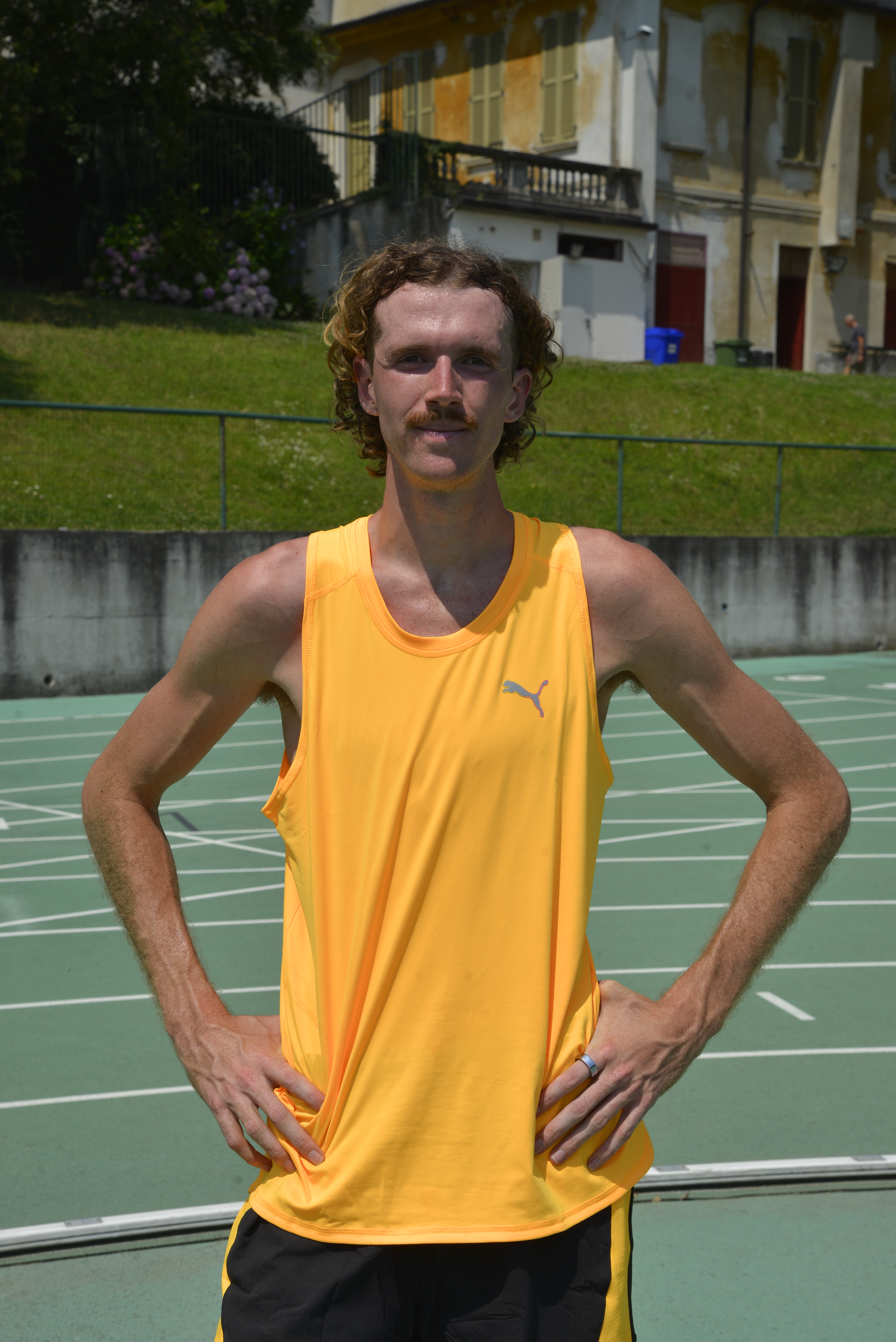
- Murphy in 2024

Personal information
- Nationality: Australian
- Born: 22 October 2001 (age 24) Randwick, New South Wales, Australia
- Height: 197 cm (6 ft 6 in)
- Weight: 80 kg (176 lb)

Sport
- Sport: Athletics
- Event: Triple jump

Achievements and titles
- Personal best: Triple jump: 16.82m (2024)
Medal record
Men's athletics
Representing Australia
Oceania Championships
Bronze medal – third place	2024 Suva	Triple jump
Pacific Games
Gold medal – first place	2023 Honiara	Triple jump
Summer World University Games
Gold medal – first place	2025 Bochum	Triple jump

Connor Murphy (born 22 October 2001) is an Australian triple jumper. He won the Australian championships in 2024 and 2025 and competed at the 2024 Summer Olympics and 2025 World Athletics Championships and won the gold medal at the 2025 Summer World University Games. He is the son of Andrew Murphy and Liz Murphy.

== Early life ==
Murphy was born in Randwick and resides in Camperdown, which are both suburbs of Sydney in New South Wales, Australia. He attended Trinity Grammar School in New South Wales and studies biomedical engineering and neuroscience at the University of Sydney.

== Career ==
He jumped a new personal best 16.45 metres to win the triple jump at the 2023 Pacific Games in the Solomon Islands, in December 2023.

He improved his personal best to 16.82 metres in February 2024 in Melbourne. In April 2024, he won the national triple jump title at the Australian Athletics Championships in Adelaide. In June, he won the bronze medal at the 2024 Oceania Athletics Championshipsin Suva, Fiji, behind compatriot Aiden Hinson.

He was selected to compete for Australia at the 2024 Summer Olympics in Paris. He jumped 16.80 metres in the qualifying round to reach the final, where he placed twelfth overall.

He retained his title at the 2025 Australian Athletics Championships with a triple jump of 16.63 metres on 12 April 2025. He finished in sixth place in the triple jump at the 2025 Xiamen Diamond League event in China, in April 2025. He won the gold medal for Australia at the 2025 Summer World University Games in Germany. In September 2025, he competed at the 2025 World Championships in Tokyo, Japan.

== Personal life ==
He is the son of Australian Olympic triple jumper Andrew Murphy and Liz Murphy.
