= Almir dos Santos =

Brazilian track and field athlete

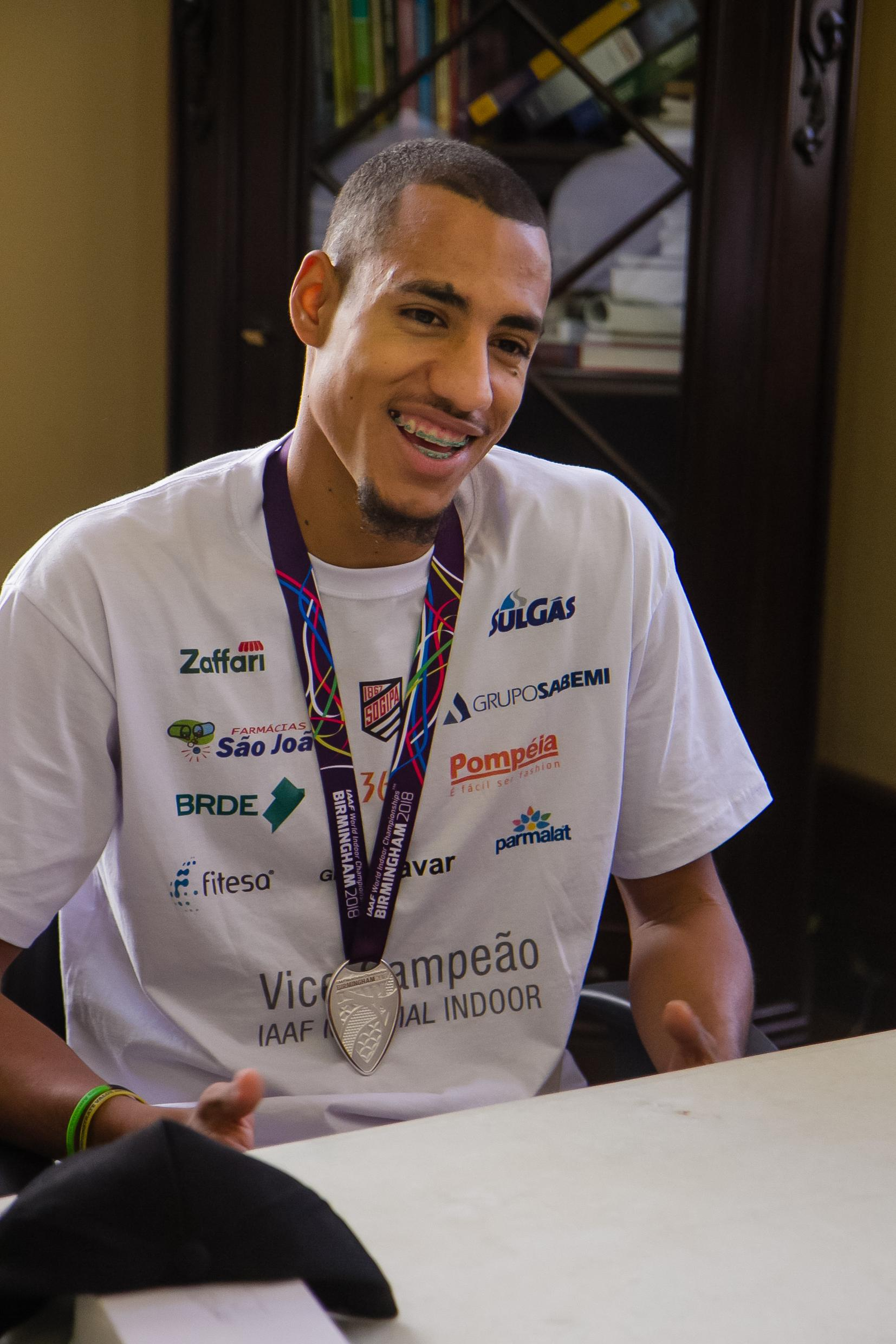

Personal information
- Born: 4 September 1993 (age 32) Matupá, Mato Grosso, Brazil
- Height: 1.91 m (6 ft 3 in)

Sport
- Sport: Athletics
- Events: Triple jump Long jump
Medal record
Men's athletics
Representing Brazil
World Indoor Championships
Silver medal – second place	2018 Birmingham	Triple jump
Pan American Games
Silver medal – second place	2023 Santiago	Triple jump

Almir Cunha dos Santos (born 4 September 1993) is a Brazilian male track and field athlete who competes in the triple jump and long jump. He was a silver medallist in the triple jump at the IAAF World Indoor Championships in 2018.

== Athletic career ==
Born in Matupá, in the central state of Mato Grosso, he took up athletics at a young age, initially focusing on the high jump. He moved to Porto Alegre and had his first success at the 2010 South American Youth Championships in Athletics, where he took the gold medal. He tried out the long jump, clearing 7.26 m (23 ft 9 3/4 in) in 2011 and competing in qualifying at the 2012 World Junior Championships, but remained focused on the high jump until 2014 – a season in which he set a personal best of 2.18 m (7 ft 1 3/4 in).

After little progress in the high jump in the 2014 and 2015 seasons, he returned to the long jump in 2017. He came away with an improved best of 7.96 m (26 ft 1 1/4 in) and a fifth-place finish at the South American Championships. However, it was the triple jump in which he showed the most promise that year, setting a best of 16.86 m (55 ft 3 3/4 in) in his hometown of Porto Alegre.

He indicated himself as an elite jumper in the 2018 season, starting with a jump of 17.06 m (55 ft 11 1/2 in) at an American meeting in Kent, Ohio. He backed this up with a performance at the top level Madrid Indoor Meeting in February, winning with a world-leading mark of 17.35 m (56 ft 11 in) ahead of former world and Olympic champion Nelson Évora. These performances qualified him for the 2018 IAAF World Indoor Championships, and in the final, he took the lead in round two with a clearance of 17.22 m (56 ft 5 3/4 in). He improved further to 17.41 m (57 ft 1 1/4 in), two centimetres short of the new leader Will Claye, and left with a silver medal from his senior global debut.

After 2018, Almir dos Santos had a series of injuries, and only in 2022 he returned to compete at a high level, reaching the final of the triple jump at the 2022 World Athletics Championships, finishing in 7th place.

In july 2023, at the 2023 South American Championships in Athletics, qualified for the 2023 World Championships and for the 2024 Olympic Games in the triple jump, by jumping 17.24m.

At the 2024 Ibero-American Championships in Athletics, held in Cuiabá, he broke the competition record and confirmed the Olympic index to compete in the triple jump in Paris, jumping 17.31m.

At the 2024 Summer Olympics, in Paris, he achieved a mark of 17.06 in the qualification, qualifying in fifth place for the final. He did not perform well in the final and finished in 11th place with a jump of 16.41.

At the 2025 World Athletics Indoor Championships, he initially won the bronze medal in the triple jump with a mark of 17.22, however he was disqualified five hours after the event due to having shoes with a sole thickness outside of the regulations.

== International competitions ==
Year	Competition	Venue	Position	Event	Notes
2010	South American Youth Championships	Santiago, Chile	1st	High jump	2.00 m
2012	World Junior Championships	Barcelona, Spain	26th (q)	High jump	2.05 m
2017	South American Championships	Asunción, Paraguay	5th	Long jump	7.51 m w
2018	World Indoor Championships	Birmingham, United Kingdom	2nd	Triple jump	17.41 m
2019	Pan American Games	Lima, Peru	4th	Triple jump	16.70 m
2019	World Championships	Doha, Qatar	12th	Triple jump	15.01 m
2021	Olympic Games	Tokyo, Japan	23rd (q)	Triple jump	16.27 m
2022	South American Indoor Championships	Cochabamba, Bolivia	2nd	Triple jump	16.59 m
2022	Ibero-American Championships	La Nucía, Spain	4th	Triple jump	16.59 m
2022	World Championships	Eugene, United States	7th	Triple jump	16.87 m
2023	South American Championships	São Paulo, Brazil	1st	Triple jump	17.24 m
2023	World Championships	Budapest, Hungary	21st (q)	Triple jump	16.48 m
2023	Pan American Games	Santiago, Chile	2nd	Triple jump	16.92 m
2024	World Indoor Championships	Glasgow, United Kingdom	10th	Triple jump	16.63 m
2024	Ibero-American Championships	Cuiabá, Brazil	1st	Triple jump	17.31 m
2024	Olympic Games	Paris, France	11th	Triple jump	16.41 m
2025	South American Indoor Championships	Cochabamba, Bolivia	2nd	Triple jump	16.39 m
2025	World Indoor Championships	Nanjing, China	–	Triple jump	DQ
2025	South American Championships	Mar del Plata, Argentina	1st	Triple jump	16.68 m
2025	World Championships	Tokyo, Japan	13th (q)	Triple jump	16.79 m
2026	South American Indoor Championships	Cochabamba, Bolivia	2nd	Triple jump	16.43 m
2026	World Indoor Championships	Toruń, Poland	6th	Triple jump	16.92 m
2026	Pan American Championships	Medellín, Colombia	1st	Triple jump	17.24 m

== Personal bests ==
- High jump – 2.18 m (7 ft 1 3/4 in) (2014)
- Long jump – 7.96 m (26 ft 1 1/4 in) (2017)
- Triple jump – 17.53 m (57 ft 6 in) (2018)
- Triple jump indoor – 17.46 m (57 ft 3 1/4 in) (2019)

== Season's best (triple jump) ==
- 2017 – 16.86
- 2018 – 17.53
- 2019 – 17.46
- 2020 – 16.65
- 2021 – 17.14
- 2022 – 17.10
- 2023 – 17.24
- 2024 – 17.31
- 2025 – 17.07
