= Yu Gyu-min =

South Korean athlete (born 2001)

Personal information
- Born: 22 April 2001 (age 25)

Sport
- Sport: Athletics
- Event(s): Long jump, Triple jump

Achievements and titles
- Personal best(s): Triple Jump: 16.91m (2024); Long Jump: 7.35m (2019)
Medal record
Men's athletics
Representing South Korea
Asian Championships
Bronze medal – third place	2025 Gumi	Triple jump
Asian Indoor Championships
Bronze medal – third place	2023 Astana	Triple jump
Asian Junior Championships
Silver medal – second place	2018 Gifu	Triple jump

Yu Gyu-min (born 22 April 2001) is a South Korean triple jumper.

== Career ==
Yu won the silver medal in the triple jump in Gifu, Japan, at the 2018 Asian Junior Athletics Championships with a jump of 15.56 metres.

He won a bronze medal in the triple jump at the 2023 Asian Indoor Athletics Championships in Kazakhstan with 16.73 metres in February 2023. He jumped 16.28 metres for a fifth place finish at the 2023 Asian Games in Hangzhou, China.

He had a sixth place finish in the triple jump at the 2024 Asian Indoor Athletics Championships in Tehran, Iran, with 15.64 metres in February 2024. He jumped a new personal best 16.91 metres to win the South Korean championships in June 2024.

He won the bronze medal in the triple jump at the 2025 Asian Athletics Championships in Gumi, South Korea in May 2025, with a best jump of 16.82 metres. In September 2025, he competed at the 2025 World Championships in Tokyo, Japan.
