= Andy Díaz =

Cuban-born Italian triple jumper

- Díaz in 2025

Personal information
- Full name: Andy Díaz Hernández
- Born: 25 December 1995 (age 30) Havana, Cuba
- Height: 1.92 m (6 ft 4 in)
- Weight: 80 kg (176 lb)

Sport
- Sport: Athletics
- Event: Triple jump
- Coached by: Fabrizio Donato

Achievements and titles
- Personal best: 18.15 m (2026)
Medal record
Representing Italy
Olympic Games
Bronze medal – third place	2024 Paris	Triple jump
World Indoor Championships
Gold medal – first place	2025 Nanjing	Triple jump
Gold medal – first place	2026 Toruń	Triple jump
Diamond League
First place	2023	Triple jump
First place	2025	Triple jump
First place	2026	Triple jump
European Championships
Gold medal – first place	2026 Birmingham	Triple jump
European Indoor Championships
Gold medal – first place	2025 Apeldoorn	Triple jump
Representing Cuba
Diamond League
First place	2022	Triple jump
Pan American Games
Bronze medal – third place	2019 Lima	Triple jump

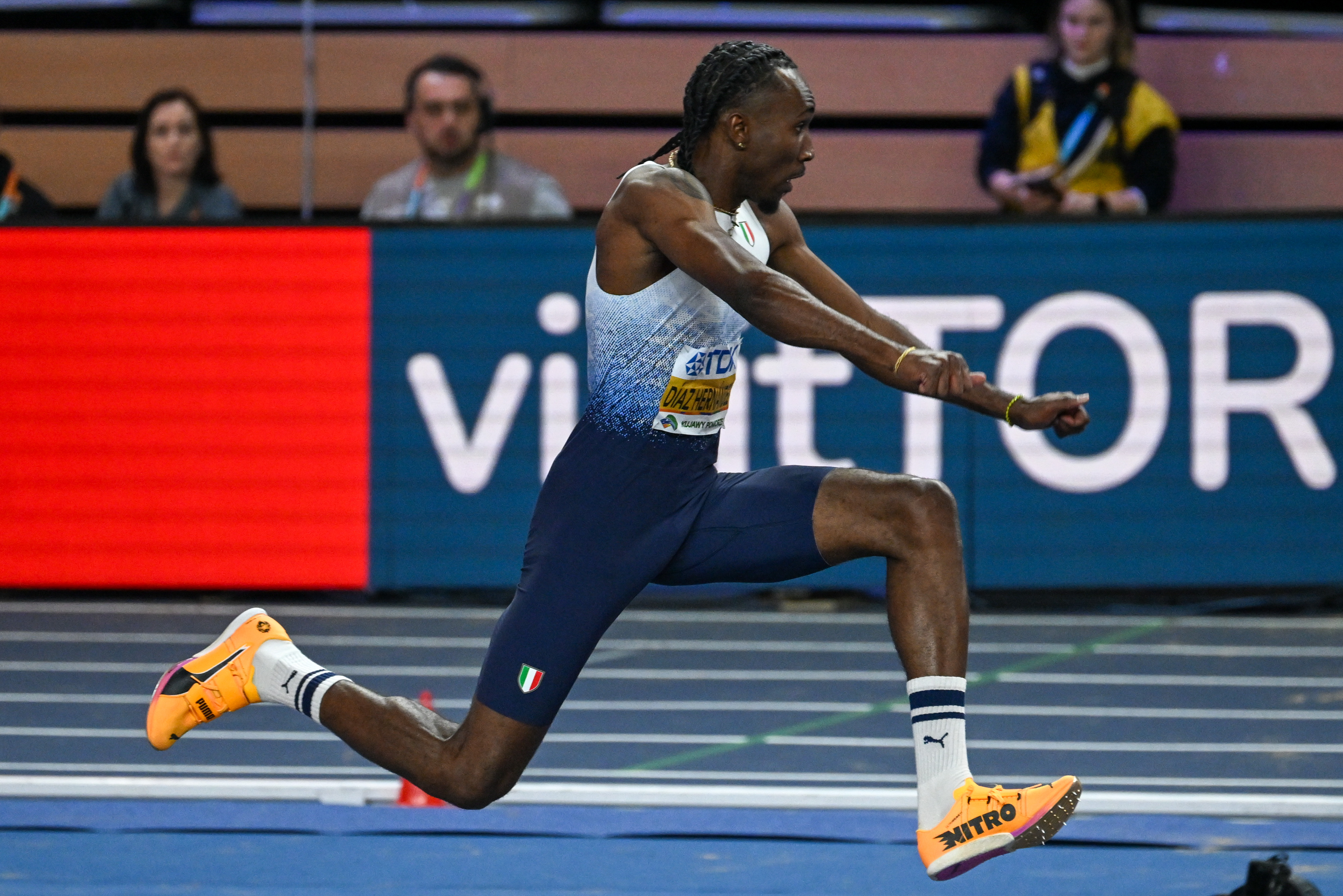
Diaz at Torun 2026.

Andy Díaz Hernández (Note: In this Spanish name, the first or paternal surname is Díaz and the second or maternal family name is Hernández.) (born 25 December 1995) is a Cuban-born Italian athlete specialising in the triple jump. He represented Cuba at the 2017 World Championships, finishing seventh in the final. He traveled to the 2020 Summer Olympics but did not compete due to injury. He later defected to Italy.

== Career ==
His personal bests in the event are 18.15 metres outdoors (Birmingham 2026) and 17.80 metres indoors (Nanjing 2025). He also has a best of 7.40 metres (+0.4 m/s) in the long jump from 2017.

Díaz became Italian citizen on 23 February 2023.

== Achievements ==
Year	Competition	Venue	Position	Event	Notes
Representing Cuba
2014	World Junior Championships	Eugene, United States	4th	Triple jump	16.43 m (w)
2015	NACAC Championships	San José, Costa Rica	5th	Triple jump	16.03 m (w)
2017	World Championships	London, United Kingdom	7th	Triple jump	17.13 m
2018	World Indoor Championships	Birmingham, United Kingdom	15th	Triple jump	15.37 m
2019	Pan American Games	Lima, Peru	3rd	Triple jump	16.83 m
2019	World Championships	Doha, Qatar	24th (q)	Triple jump	16.41 m
2021	Olympic Games	Tokyo, Japan	DNS	Triple jump	DNS
Representing Italy
2024	Olympic Games	Paris, France	3rd	Triple jump	17.64 m
2025	European Indoor Championships	Apeldoorn, Netherlands	1st	Triple jump	17.71 m
2025	World Indoor Championships	Nanjing, China	1st	Triple jump	17.80 m
2025	World Championships	Tokyo, Japan	6th	Triple jump	17.19 m
2026	World Indoor Championships	Toruń, Poland	1st	Triple jump	17.47 m
2026	European Championships	Birmingham, United Kingdom	1st	Triple jump	18.15 m

== Circuit wins and titles ==
- Diamond League champion: 2022
- Diamond League champion: 2023
- Diamond League champion: 2025

== National titles ==
Diaz won four national championships at individual senior level.

- Italian Athletics Championships
  - Triple jump: 2023, 2025, 2026
- Italian Athletics Indoor Championships
  - Triple jump: 2024

== See also ==
- Italian all-time lists - Triple jump
