= Eldhose Paul =

Indian athlete

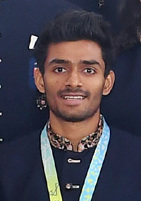
- Paul in August 2022

Personal information
- Born: 7 November 1996 (age 29) Ernakulam, Kerala, India
- Education: Mar Athanasius College, Kothamangalam National Cadet Corps

Sport
- Event: Triple jump

Achievements and titles
- Personal best: 17.03 m (CWG- 2022)
Medal record
Men's Triple jump
Representing India
Commonwealth Games
Gold medal – first place	2022 Birmingham	Triple jump

Eldhose Paul (born 7 November 1996) is an Indian athlete who competes in triple jump. In 2022, he became the first Indian to qualify for the final of the triple jump at the World Athletics Championships. At the 2022 Commonwealth Games, he became the first Indian to win a gold medal in men's triple jump.
