= Andrea Dallavalle =

Italian triple jumper (born 1999)

Personal information
- National team: Italy
- Born: 31 October 1999 (age 26) Piacenza, Italy
- Height: 1.83 m (6 ft 0 in)
- Weight: 65 kg (143 lb)

Sport
- Sport: Athletics
- Event: Triple jump
- Club: G.S. Fiamme Gialle
- Coached by: Ennio Buttò

Achievements and titles
- Personal best: Triple jump: 17.64 m (2025)
Medal record
Men's athletics
Representing Italy
World Championships
Silver medal – second place	2025 Tokyo	Triple jump
European Championships
Silver medal – second place	2022 Munich	Triple jump
Bronze medal – third place	2026 Birmingham	Triple jump
European Indoor Championships
Bronze medal – third place	2025 Apeldoorn	Triple jump
European U23 Championships
Gold medal – first place	2021 Tallinn	Triple jump
Bronze medal – third place	2019 Gävle	Triple jump
European U20 Championships
Silver medal – second place	2017 Grosseto	Triple jump
European Youth Championships
Silver medal – second place	2016 Tbilisi	Triple jump

Andrea Dallavalle (born 31 October 1999) is an Italian triple jumper and world silver medallist at Tokyo 2025.

== Biography ==
On July 23, 2017, winning the silver medal at the 2017 European Athletics U20 Championships, with a measure of 16.87 m has also sets the standard entry, established at 16.80 m, of access to the 2017 World Championships in Athletics. This measure also allows him to place himself in the 31st place in the top IAAF world-leading list, which is however the 25th measure considering that every nation can participate in world championships with up to three athletes.

At the 2025 World Athletics Championships in Tokyo, Dallavalle won the silver medal after jumping his personal best of 17.64m at his last attempt.

== Personal best ==
- Triple jump: 17.64 m (+1.5 m/s; (Japan) Tokyo, 19 September 2025)
- Long jump: 7.57 m (+0.3 m/s; (Italy) Reggio Emilia, 17 September 2017)

== Achievements ==
Year	Competition	Venue	Position	Event	Measure	Notes
2016	European Youth Championships	(Georgia (country)) Tbilisi	2nd	Triple jump	15.74 m	
2017	European U20 Championships	(Italy) Grosseto	2nd	Triple jump	16.87 m	NU20R
2019	European U23 Championships	(Sweden) Gävle	3rd	Triple jump	16.95 m	
2021	European U23 Championships	(Estonia) Tallinn	1st	Triple jump	17.05 m	
2021	Olympic Games	(Japan) Tokyo	9th	Triple jump	16.85 m	
2022	World Championships	(United States) Eugene	4th	Triple jump	17.25 m	
2022	European Championships	(Germany) Munich	2nd	Triple jump	17.04 m	
2025	World Championships	(Japan) Tokyo	2nd	Triple jump	17.64 m	

== National titles ==
Dallavalle won five national championships at individual senior level.

- Italian Athletics Championships
  - Triple jump: 2020, 2022, 2024
- Italian Athletics Indoor Championships
  - Triple jump: 2025, 2026

== See also ==
- Italian all-time lists - Triple jump
