= Emmanuel Ihemeje =

Nigerian-Italian triple jumper

Personal information
- Full name: Chiebuka Emmanuel Ihemeje
- Born: 9 October 1998 (age 27) Carrara, Italy
- Height: 1.86 m (6 ft 1 in)
- Weight: 82 kg (181 lb)

Sport
- Country: Italy
- Sport: Athletics
- Event: Triple jump
- Club: Atletica Estrada; University of Oregon Athletics

Achievements and titles
- Personal bests: Triple jump outdoor: 17.14 m (2021); Triple jump indoor: 17.26 m (2021)

Chiebuka Emmanuel Ihemeje (born 9 October 1998) is a Nigerian-Italian triple jumper. He competed at the 2020 Summer Olympics, in Triple jump.

== Biography ==
Ihemeje was born in Carrara, Tuscany to Nigerian parents but lives in Verdellino near Bergamo. He jumped to the honors of the international sports news on 13 March 2021 when, winning the triple jump race at the NCCA Indoor Track and Field Championships in Fayetteville, Arkansas with the measure of 17.26 m, he established the fourth best Italian indoor all-time performance (fifth overall considering also the you turned out to be outdoor), the minimum for the Tokyo 2021 Olympics and the third best performance in the seasonal world lists.

He start the 2021 outdoor season winning the 2021 NCAA Division I Outdoor Track and Field Championships triple jump with his outdoor best of 17.14 m.

== Personal bests ==
- Triple jump outdoor: 17.14 m ( (United States) Eugene, 11 June 2021)
- Triple jump indoor: 17.26 m ( (United States) Fayetteville, 13 March 2021)

== Achievements ==
Youth level

Year	Competition	Venue	Rank	Event	Measure	Notes
2017	European U20 Championships	(Italy) Grosseto	6th	Triple jump	15.84 m	

== See also ==
- Italian all-time lists - Triple jump
- Naturalized athletes of Italy
