= Su Wen (triple jumper) =

Chinese track and field athlete

Personal information
- Born: 10 February 1999 (age 27)

Sport
- Country: China
- Sport: Athletics
- Event: Triple jump

Achievements and titles
- Personal best: Triple jump: 17.42 (2026)
Medal record
Men's athletics
Representing China
Asian Games
Gold medal – first place	2026 Aichi-Nagoya	Triple jump
Asian Indoor Championships
Gold medal – first place	2024 Tehran	Triple jump
Gold medal – first place	2026 Tianjin	Triple jump
Summer World University Games
Gold medal – first place	2021 Chengdu	Triple jump

Su Wen (Chinese: 粟文; born 10 February 1999) is a Chinese track and field athlete.

He is studying at the East China Normal University. He won a gold medal in the triple jump at the 2021 Summer World University Games.
