= Abdulla Aboobacker =

Indian athlete

JWO Abdulla Aboobacker
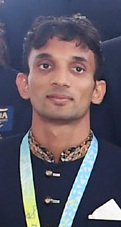
- Aboobacker in 2022

Personal information
- Full name: Abdulla Ibnu Aboobacker Narangolintevida
- Born: 17 January 1996 (age 30) Nadapuram, Kerala, India
- Education: Mar Athanasius College of Engineering
- Military career
- Branch: Indian Air Force
- Service years: 2014–present
- Rank: Junior Warrant Officer

Sport
- Sport: Track and field
- Event: Triple jump

Achievements and titles
- Personal best: 17.19 m (2022)
Medal record
Men's athletics
Representing India
Commonwealth Games
Silver medal – second place	2022 Birmingham	Triple jump
Asian Championships
Gold medal – first place	2023 Bangkok	Triple jump

Abdulla Aboobacker (born 17 January 1996) is an Indian triple jumper. He won the gold medal in the men's triple jump at the 2023 Asian Championships and the silver medal at the 2022 Commonwealth Games. He has also competed in the men's triple jump at the 2022 Asian Games, where he narrowly missed a medal with a fourth-place finish.

== Results ==
Date	Competition	Cnt.	Cat	Race	Pl.	Result	Score	Wind	Remarks
1 March 2022	Indian Open Jumps Competitions, Thiruvananthapuram	IND	F	F	3.	16.81	1114	NWI	
23 March 2022	Indian Grand Prix, Thiruvananthapuram	IND	F	F	2.	16.70	1136	-0.6	
6 April 2022	National Federation Cup, CH Muhammed Koya Stadium, Thenhipalam	IND	F	F	4.	16.50	1111	+0.2	
21 May 2022	Indian Grand Prix, Bhubaneshwar	IND	F	F	1.	17.19	1185	+1.4	
14 June 2022	National Inter State Senior Athletics Ch., Jawaharlal Nehru Stadium, Chennai	IND	B	F	2.	17.14	1179	0.0	
21 July 2022	World Athletics Championships, Oregon 2022, Hayward Field, Eugene	USA	OW	Q2	10.	16.45	1106	0.0	
7 August 2022	XXII Commonwealth Games, Alexander Stadium, Birmingham	GBR	A	F1	2.	17.02	1167	+1.2	
