= Zhu Yaming =

Chinese triple jumper

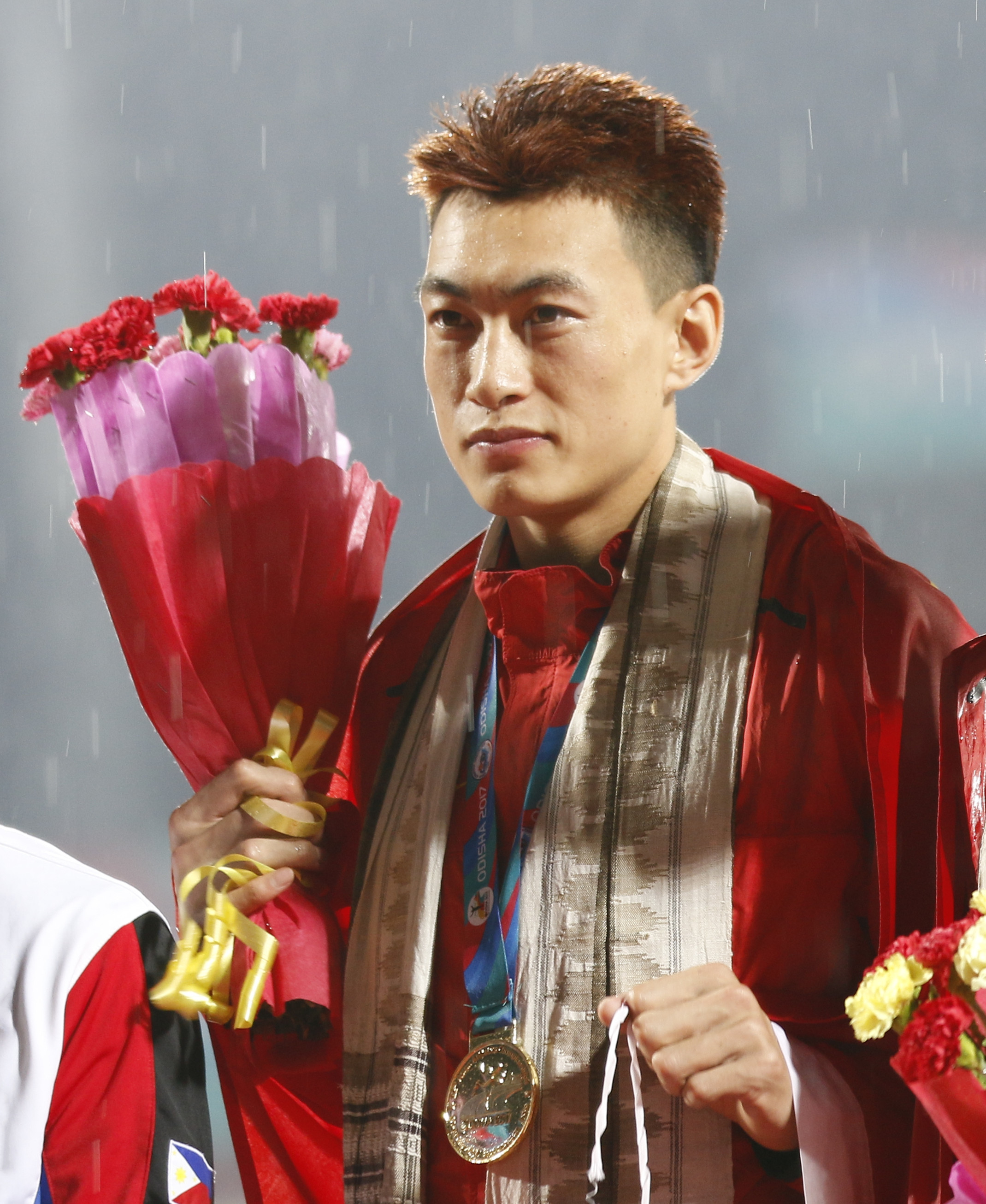
- Zhu at the 2017 Asian Championships

Personal information
- Born: 4 May 1994 (age 32); Hulunbuir, Inner Mongolia, China
- Height: 192 cm (6 ft 4 in)
- Weight: 78 kg (172 lb)

Sport
- Sport: Athletics
- Event: Triple jump
- Coached by: Xu Dongwen (club)

Achievements and titles
- Personal best: 17.57 m (2021)
Medal record
Men's athletics
Representing China
Olympic Games
| Silver medal – second place | 2020 Tokyo | Triple jump |
World Championships
| Bronze medal – third place | 2022 Eugene | Triple jump |
World Indoor Championships
| Silver medal – second place | 2025 Nanjing | Triple jump |
Asian Games
| Gold medal – first place | 2022 Hangzhou | Triple jump |
Asian Championships
| Gold medal – first place | 2017 Bhubaneshwar | Triple jump |
| Gold medal – first place | 2025 Gumi | Triple jump |

Zhu Yaming (Chinese: 朱亚明; born 4 May 1994) is a Chinese male triple jumper. He is the 2017 Asian champion in the event.

Zhu began competing nationally in triple jump in 2015 and reached elite level in the 2017 outdoor season. He jumped 17.17 m (56 ft 3 3/4 in) to win the national title at the Chinese Athletics Championships, then set a new best of 17.23 m (56 ft 6 1/4 in) to defeat Olympic medallist Dong Bin and Asian Games champion Cao Shuo at the National Games of China. The standard of competition was lower at the 2017 Asian Athletics Championships, which he won a gold medal at with a clearance of 16.82 m (55 ft 2 in).

He placed seventh at the 2018 IAAF World Indoor Championships with an indoor best of 16.87 m (55 ft 4 in). At the 2018 Asian Games he finished eighth.

Zhu competed in the Tokyo 2020 Olympic Games and on 5 August 2021 won the silver medal in the Triple Jump.
