= 2020 Italian Athletics Championships =

- Dates: 28–30 August 2020; 17–18 October 2020
- Host city: Padua; Modena; Vittorio Veneto
- Venue: Stadio Daciano Colbachini; Campo scuola atletica Modena
- Level: Senior
- Events: 42 (32 in Padua, 10 in Modena)
- Participation: 638+943 (phase 2) athletes
- Records set: 1 National Junior and 1 National Best

The 2020 Italian Athletics Championships are the 110th edition of the Italian Athletics Championships and took place in Padua — instead of La Spezia as initially scheduled before the COVID-19 pandemic.

10 running events are held later 17–18 October 2020, in Campo Scuola Atletica, Modena, for all the long-distance events (1500m and more, walking races), with the 10km (track) previously in Vittorio Veneto.

The only National Record set during these Championships was the Italian Junior record by Rachele Mori (born 2003) with 65.03 m, second at Hammer Throw, but the Championships Record of 21.99 m by Leonardo Fabbri was considered as the best mark of all the first phase.

The best performance of the second phase, called Festa dell’Endurance in Modena, was the National Best on 10 km walk (road) by Antonella Palmisano.

== Champions ==
First title at senior level for Larissa Iapichino at the Italian championships 2020.

Track events
Event	Men	Performance	Women	Performance
100 m	Marcell Jacobs	10.10 (+3.3)	Zaynab Dosso	11.35 (+2.2)
200 m	Antonio Infantino	20.71 (+0.3)	Dalia Kaddari	23.30 PB (-0.1)
400 m	Edoardo Scotti	45.77	Alice Mangione	52.70 PB
800 m	Simone Barontini	1:48.16	Elena Bellò	2:04.01
1500 m (Modena)	Joao Bussotti	3:47.51	Eleonora Vandi	4:18.39
5000 m (Modena)	Ala Zoghlami	14:04:44	Nadia Battocletti	15:46.26 PB
10000 m (Vittorio V., 27 Sep.)	Osama Zoghlami	29:07.27	Valeria Straneo	32:55.25 SB
110/100 m hs	Lorenzo Perini	13.53 (+1.7)	Luminosa Bogliolo	13.02 (-0.2)
400 m hs	Mario Lambrughi	49.84 SB	Ayomide Folorunso	56.47
3000 m st (Modena)	Ala Zoghlami	8:26.22	Martina Merlo	9:59.54
4 × 100 m relay	Athletic Club 96 Alperia; Antonio Infantino; Jacques Riparelli; Alessandro Monte; Kevin Giacomelli	41.25	Atletica Brescia 1950; Chiara Melon; Gaia Pedreschi; Alessia Niotta; Alessia Pavese	45.44
4 × 400 m relay	Atletica Futura Roma; Alessandro Galati; Casimiro Sciscione; Osaremen Ozigbo; Mario Di Giambattista	3:12.94	Centro Sportivo Esercito; Marta Milani; Valentina Cavalleri; Maria Benedicta Chigbolu; Raphaela Lukudo	3:34.80
Road events
10 km walk (road) (Modena)	Francesco Fortunato	39:06 PB	Antonella Palmisano	41:28 NB
Field events
High jump	Gianmarco Tamberi	2.28 m	Elena Vallortigara	1.88 m
Pole vault	Max Mandusic	5.40 m	Roberta Bruni	4.30 m
Long jump	Filippo Randazzo	7.77 m (+2.2)	Larissa Iapichino	6.32 m (-1.7)
Triple jump	Andrea Dallavalle	16.79 m SB (+1.1)	Dariya Derkach	13.56 m SB (-1.2)
Shot put	Leonardo Fabbri	21.99 m CR PB	Chiara Rosa	16.55 m
Discus throw	Giovanni Faloci	61.87 m	Daisy Osakue	58.26 m
Hammer throw	Marco Lingua	71,98 m	Sara Fantini	68.50 m
Javelin throw	Norbert Bonvecchio	74.64 m SB	Carolina Visca	55.57 m
Combined
Decathlon/Heptathlon	Dario Dester	7652 pts	Sveva Gerevini	5741 pts SB

== See also ==
- 2020 Italian Athletics Indoor Championships
