= 2019 Italian Athletics Championships =

- Dates: 26–28 July
- Host city: Brixen
- Level: Senior
- Events: 42

The 2019 Italian Athletics Championships was the 109th edition of the Italian Athletics Championships and took place in Brixen from 26 to 28 July.

== Champions ==
Track events
Event	Men	Performance	Women	Performance
100 m	Marcell Jacobs	10.10	Zaynab Dosso	11.47
200 m	Antonio Infantino	20.84	Gloria Hooper	23.56
400 m	Matteo Galvan	45.59 SB	Giancarla Trevisan	52.61
800 m	Simone Barontini	1:47.89	Eloisa Coiro	2:05.83
1500 m	Matteo Spanu	3:45.09	Marta Zenoni	4:30.83
5000 m	Marouan Razine	14:05.09	Marta Zenoni	15:52.89 PB
110/100 m hs	Hassane Fofana	13.71	Luminosa Bogliolo	12.85
400 m hs	Alessandro Sibilio	50.84	Ayomide Folorunso	56.40
3000 m st	Ahmed Abdelwahed	8:31.56	Isabel Mattuzzi	10:10.66
4x100 m relay	Athletic Club 96 Alperia; Jacques Riparelli; Antonio Infantino; Alessandro Monte; Kevin Giacomelli	40.92	Atletica Brescia 1950 Ispa Group; Chiara Melon; Gaia Pedreschi; Alessia Niotta; Johanelis Herrera Abreu	45.63
4x400 m relay	G.S. Fiamme Gialle; Vladimir Aceti; Michele Tricca; Alessandro Sibilio; Matteo Galvan	3:11.15	Not yet awarded	
Road events
10 km walk (road)	Gianluca Picchiottino	21.21	Eleonora Giorgi	45:28
Field events
Long jump	Filippo Randazzo	7.94 m	Tania Vicenzino	6.46 m
Triple jump	Samuele Cerro	16.52 m	Ottavia Cestonaro	13.52 m
High jump	Stefano Sottile	2.33 m PB WL	Alessia Trost	1.86 m
Pole vault	Max Mandusic	5.30 m	Sonia Malavisi	4.36 m
Shot put	Leonardo Fabbri	20.31 m	Chiara Rosa	16.10 m
Discus throw	Giovanni Faloci	59.92 m	Stefania Strumillo	57.33 m
Hammer throw	Marco Lingua	73,88 m	Sara Fantini	69.75 m
Javelin throw	Mauro Fraresso	75.54 m	Carolina Visca	58.47 m PB
Combined
Decathlon/Heptathlon	Matteo Taviani	7357 pts PB	Sveva Gerevini	5907 pts PB

Road events in Canelli, 8 September
Event	Men	Performance	Women	Performance
10 km	Lorenzo Dini		Fatna Maraoui	

== See also ==
- 2019 Italian Athletics Indoor Championships
