= 2016 Italian Athletics Championships =

- Dates: 24–26 June
- Host city: Rieti
- Venue: Stadio Raul Guidobaldi,
- Level: Senior
- Events: 42

The 2016 Italian Athletics Championships (Italian: Campionati italiani assoluti di atletica leggera 2016) was the 106th edition of the Italian Athletics Championships and were held in Rieti from 24 to 26 June 2016.

== Champions ==
Event	Men	Performance	Women	Performance
100 m	Filippo Tortu	10.46	Gloria Hooper	11.67
200 m	Fausto Desalu	20.71	Gloria Hooper	23.4
400 m	Matteo Galvan	46.87	Libania Grenot	52.92
800 m	Giordano Benedetti	1:49.05	Yusneysi Santiusti	2:06.04
1500 m	Yeman Crippa	3:45.66	Margherita Magnani	4:18.43
5000 m	Yassine Rachik	14:13.55	Veronica Inglese	16:17.74
3000 m steeplechase	Yuri Floriani	8:40.59	Francesca Bertoni	10:23.75
100 m hurdles	Hassane Fofana	14.06	Giulia Pennella	13.92
400 m hurdles	José Bencosme de Leon	50.44	Ayomide Folorunso	0:58.05
High jump	Gianmarco Tamberi	2.21	Alessia Trost	1.83
Pole vault	Giorgio Piantella	5.12	Sonia Malavisi	4.15
Long jump	Marcell Jacobs	7.68	Laura Strati	6.29
Triple jump	Daniele Cavazzani	16.08	Dariya Derkach	13.39
Shot put	Sebastiano Bianchetti	16.91	Chiara Rosa	15.46
Discus throw	Hannes Kirchler	56.24	Stefania Strumillo	53.05
Hammer throw	Marco Lingua	68.23	Francesca Massobrio	59.6
Javelin throw	Norbert Bonvecchio	73.11	Eleonora Bacciotti	52.09
10 km walk road	Francesco Fortunato	41:48.83	Valentina Trapletti	48:33.05
4X100 relay	Atletica Riccardi Milano 1946; Massimiliano Ferraro; Federico Cattaneo; Giacomo Tortu; Simone Tanzilli	39.68	G.S. Forestale	46.29
4X400 relay	G.A. Fiamme Gialle	3:10.56	C.S. Esercito	3:39.63
Decatthlon/Heptathlon	Simone Cairoli	7001	Federica Palumbo	4874.17
