= Luca Lai =

Italian sprinter

Personal information
- National team: Italy (1 cap)
- Born: 24 June 1992 (age 34) Oristano, Italy
- Height: 1.75 m (5 ft 9 in)
- Weight: 77 kg (170 lb)

Sport
- Sport: Athletics
- Event: Sprint
- Club: Athletic Club 96 Alperia
- Coached by: Alessandro Lai

Achievements and titles
- Personal bests: 60 m: 6,56 (2022); 100m: 10.22 (2020); 200m: 20.98 (2021)

Luca Lai (born 24 June 1992) is an Italian sprinter.

== Achievements ==
Senior level

Year	Competition	Venue	Rank	Event	Performance	Notes
2021	European Indoor Championships	(Poland) Toruń	25th	60 m	6.73	NQ

== National titles ==
Lai won a national championship.

- Italian Athletics Indoor Championships
  - 60 m: 2019
