= 2022 Italian Athletics Indoor Championships =

- Dates: 27-28 February
- Host city: Ancona
- Venue: Palaindoor di Ancona
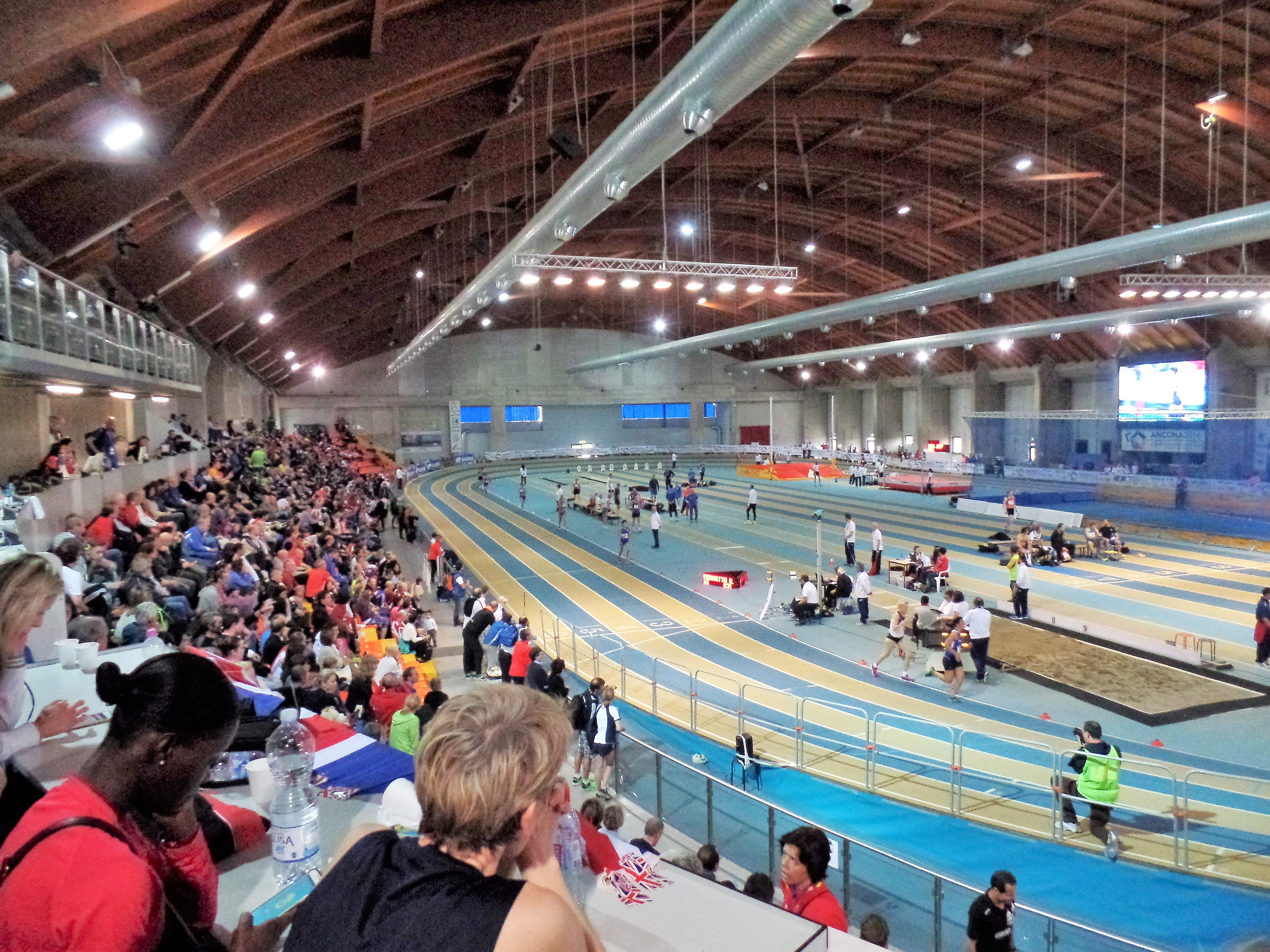
- Level: Senior
- Events: 28

2022 Italian Athletics Indoor Championships is the 53rd edition of the Italian Athletics Indoor Championships held in Ancona.

== Champions ==
Event	Men	Performance	Women	Performance
60 m	Marcell Jacobs	6.55	Zaynab Dosso	7.16 NR
400 m	Brayan Lopez	46.87 PB	Eleonora Marchiando	53.52
800 m	Catalin Tecuceanu	1:48.08	Gaia Sabbatini	2:01.07 PB
1500 m	Nesim Amsellek	3:39.87	Giulia Aprile	4:18.51
3000 m	Federico Riva	8:27.80	Ludovica Cavalli	9:09.52
Relay 4x2 rounds	Atletika Biotekna; Pietro Pivotto; Jean-Marie Robbin; Alessandro Franceschini; Emanuele Grossi	3:13.95	Bracco Atletica; Maya Bruney; Alessandra Bonora; Alessandra Iezzi; Giancarla Trevisan	3:39.14 NR
60 m hs	Paolo Dal Molin	7.62	Elisa Di Lazzaro	8.18
5000/3000 m race walk	Teodorico Caporaso	19:56.15	Simona Bertini	12:55.13
High jump	Christian Falocchi	2.21 m SB	Elena Vallortigara	1.92 m SB
Pole vault	Matteo Oliveri	5.37 m PB	Elisa Molinarolo	4.46 m SB
Long jump	Filippo Randazzo	8.00 m SB	Marta Amouhin Amani	6.32 m
Triple jump	Simone Biasutti	16.23 m	Dariya Derkach	14.26 m PB
Shot put	Nick Ponzio	21.34 m	Martina Carnevale	16.12 m PB
Combined events (heptahlon/pentathlon)	Dario Dester	6038 pts SB	Sveva Gerevini	4451 pts NR

Note:

- Full results.

== See also ==
- 2022 Italian Athletics Championships
