= Marcell Jacobs =

Italian sprinter and long jumper (born 1994)

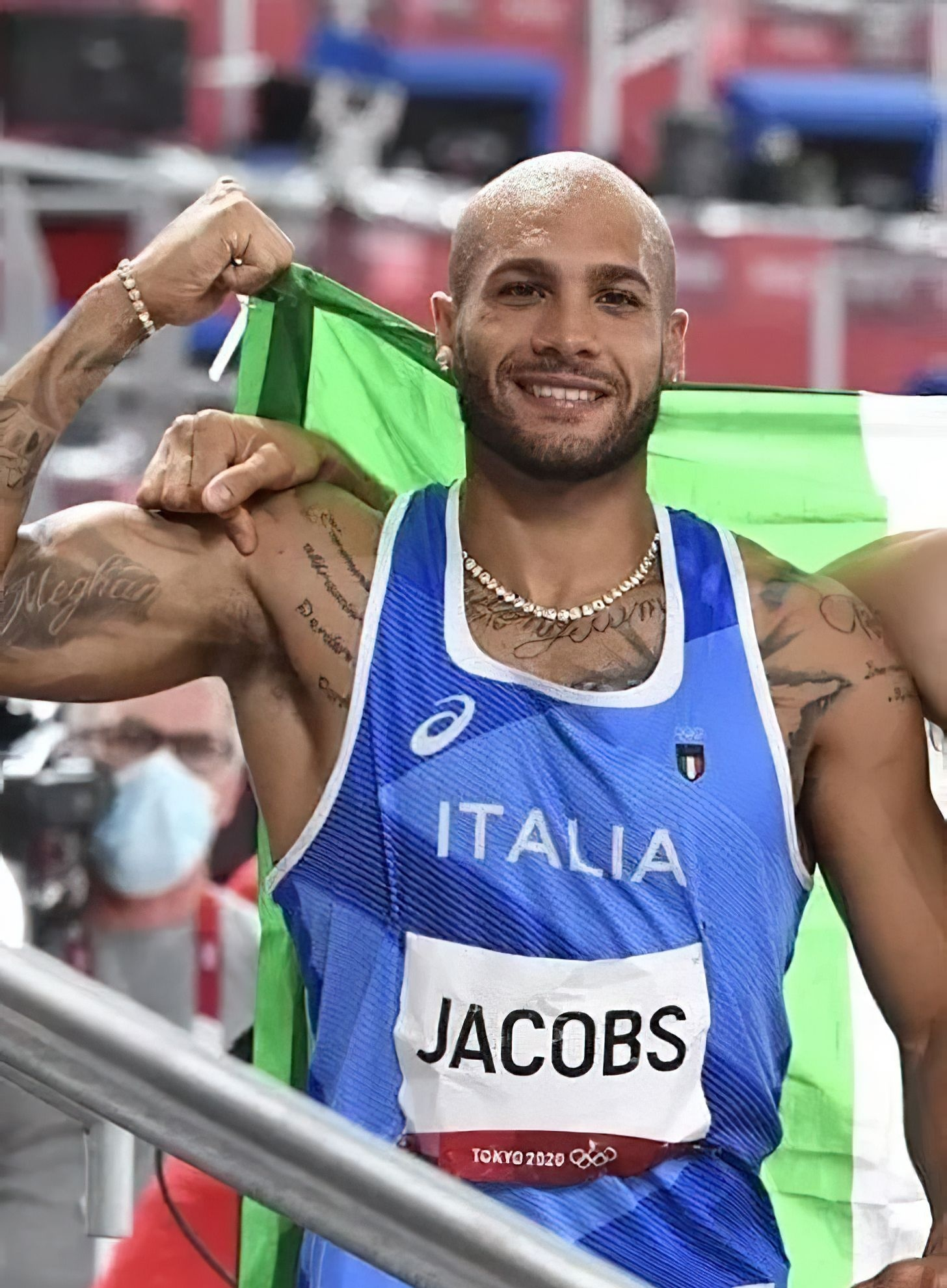
- Jacobs in 2021

Personal information
- Full name: Lamont Marcell Jacobs Jr.
- National team: Italy (2016–)
- Citizenship: American; Italian
- Born: 26 September 1994 (age 32) El Paso, Texas, United States
- Height: 1.86 m (6 ft 1 in)
- Weight: 84 kg (185 lb)

Sport
- Sport: Athletics
- Events: Sprints; relays; long jump
- Club: G.S. Fiamme Oro
- Coached by: Rana Reider; Paolo Camossi; Gianni Lombardi

Achievements and titles
- Personal bests: 60 m: 6.41 (2022) (i) AR; 100 m: 9.80 (2021) AR; 200 m: 20.61 (2018); 4 × 100 m relay: 37.50 (2021) NR; Long jump: 8.07 m (i) (2017)
Medal record
Men's athletics
Representing Italy
Event	1st	2nd	3rd
Olympic Games	2	0	0
World Championships	0	1	0
World Indoor Championships	1	0	0
European Championships	3	0	0
European Indoor Championships	1	1	0
World Athletics Relays	1	0	0
Mediterranean U23 Championships	1	0	0
Total	9	2	0
Olympic Games
Gold medal – first place	2020 Tokyo	100 m
Gold medal – first place	2020 Tokyo	4 × 100 m relay
World Championships
Silver medal – second place	2023 Budapest	4 × 100 m relay
World Indoor Championships
Gold medal – first place	2022 Belgrade	60 m
European Championships
Gold medal – first place	2022 Munich	100 m
Gold medal – first place	2024 Rome	100 m
Gold medal – first place	2024 Rome	4 × 100 m relay
European Indoor Championships
Gold medal – first place	2021 Toruń	60 m
Silver medal – second place	2023 Istanbul	60 m
World Athletics Relays
Gold medal – first place	2021 Chorzów	4 × 100 m relay
Mediterranean U23 Championships
Gold medal – first place	2016 Tunis	Long jump

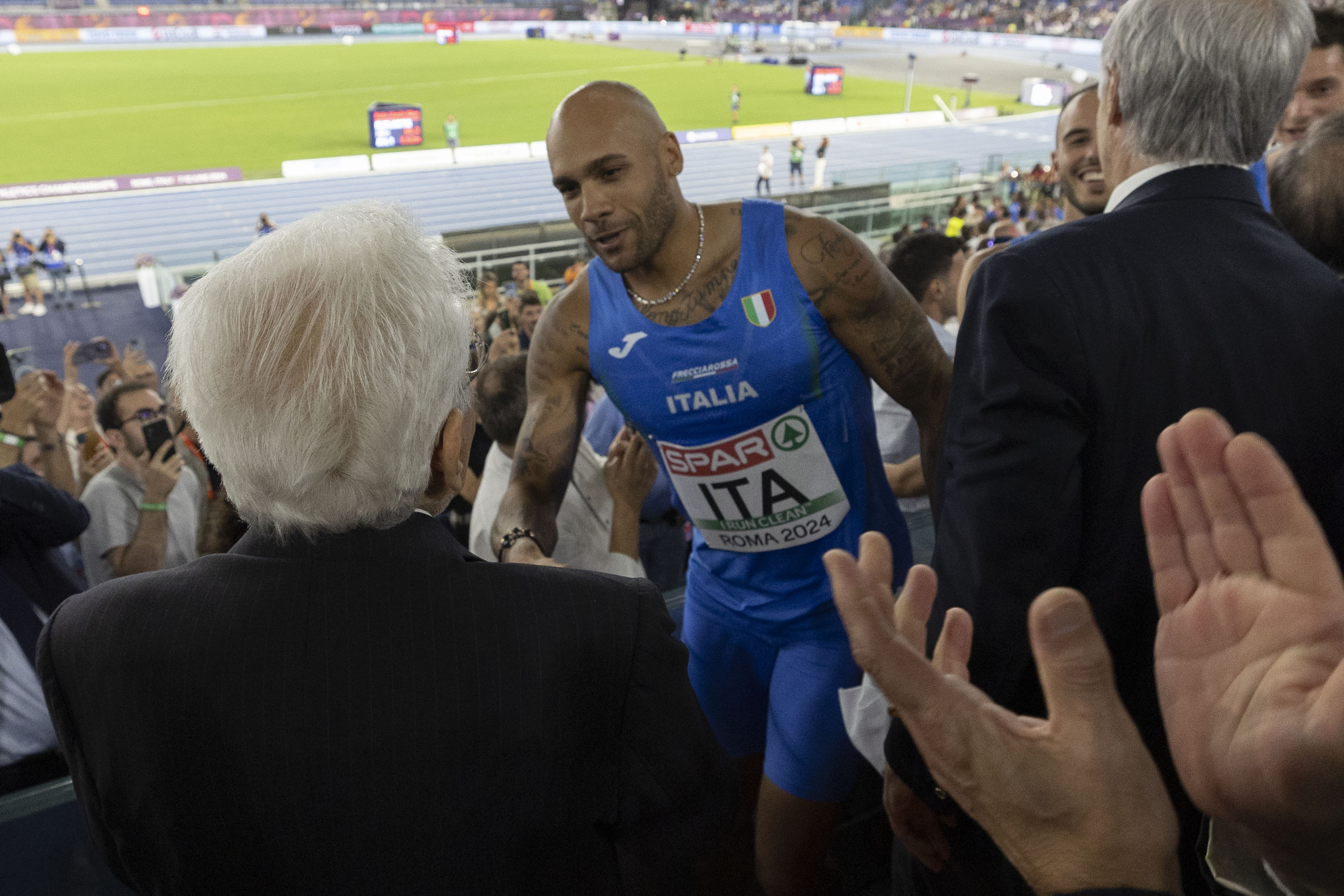
Jacobs in Stadio Olimpico with Italian President Sergio Mattarella during Roma 2024.

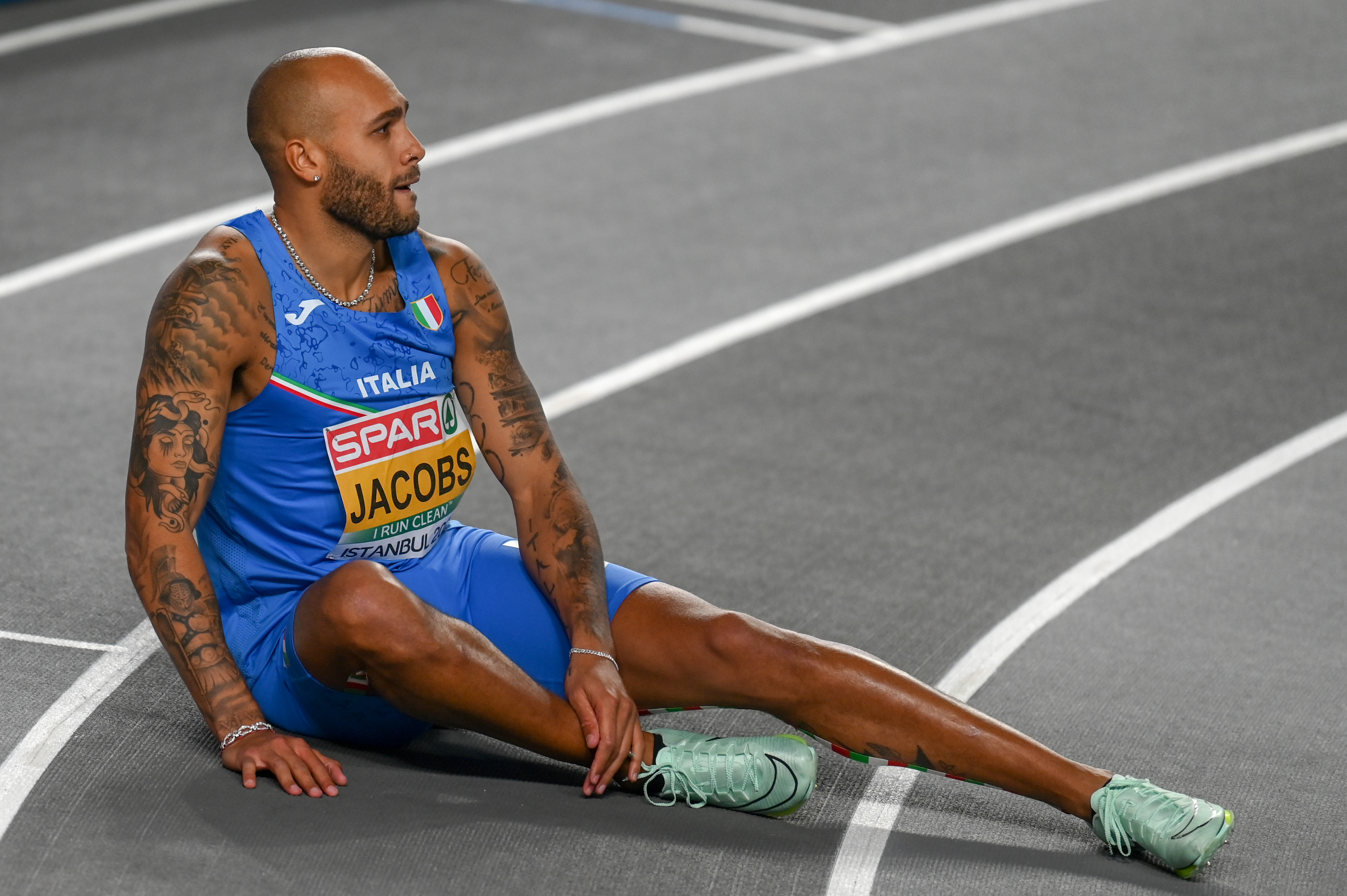
Jacobs after 60 m silver medal won at Istanbul 2023 indoor European championships.

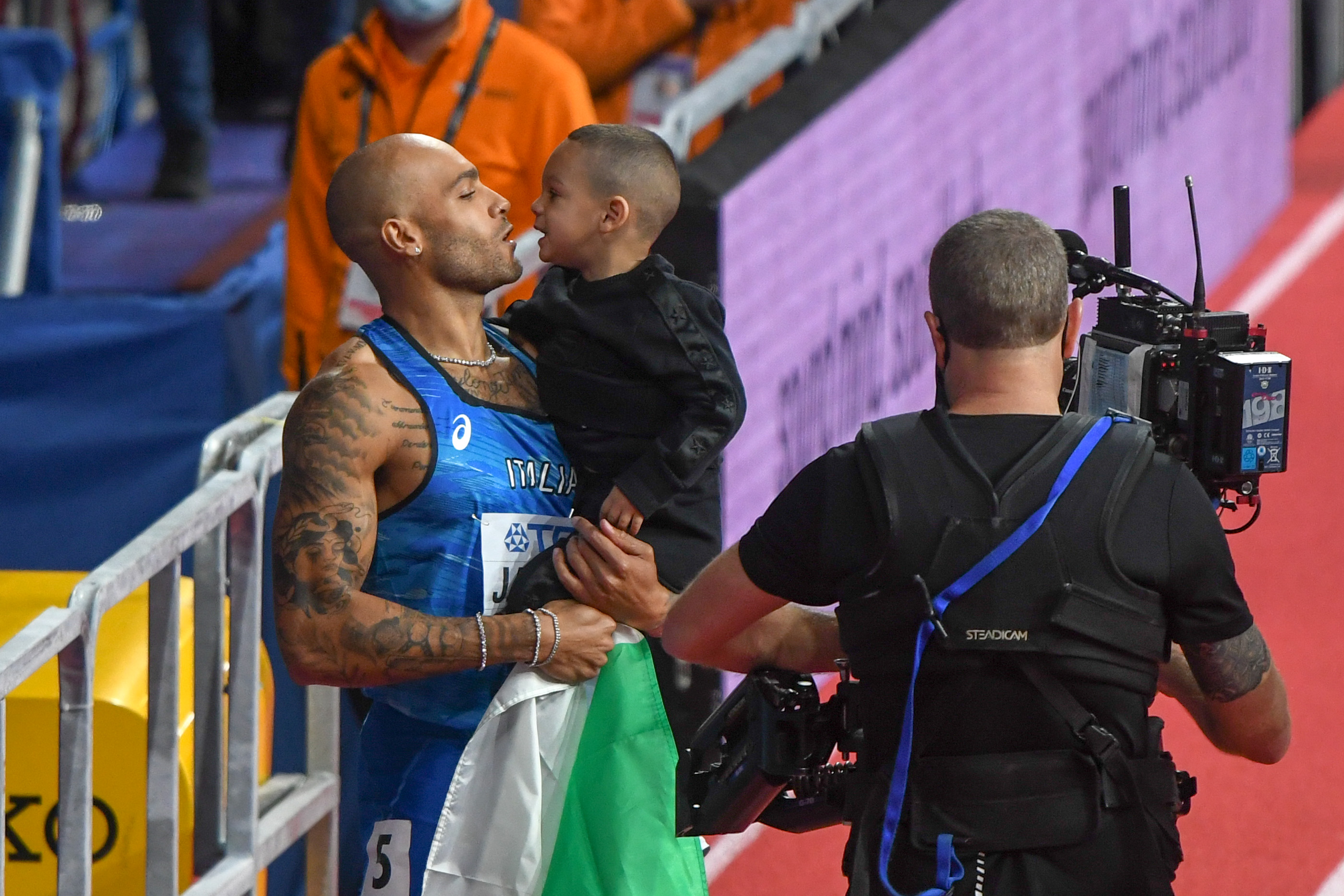
Jacobs and his son Anthony after 60 m gold medal won at Belgrade 2022 indoor world championships.

Lamont Marcell Jacobs Jr. (Italian pronunciation: [laˈmɔnt marˈsɛl ˈdʒakobs]; born 26 September 1994) is an Italian track and field sprinter and former long jumper. He is the 2020 Olympic 100 metres champion, the 2022 60 metres world champion, the 2022 and 2024 European 100 metres champion, and a member of the gold medal-winning 4 × 100 m relay team at the 2020 Olympics. He currently holds the 100 metres European record, the 60 metres European record, and is the first Italian to qualify for or win the men's 100 metres Olympic final.

== Early life ==
Jacobs is the son of Viviana Masini, an Italian woman, and Lamont Marcell Jacobs Sr., an African American serviceman. His parents met when his father was a United States Army soldier serving at Caserma Ederle in Vicenza, Italy. His father was 18 and his mother was 16 at the time.

His parents married and relocated to Fort Bliss in El Paso, Texas. Three years later, Jacobs was born. When he was three weeks old, his father was transferred to South Korea, and Jacobs moved to Desenzano del Garda, in Lombardy, Italy, with his mother. His parents split when he was six months old.

He started out playing basketball and football, where his football coach, Adriano Bertazzi, took notice of his speed and suggested that Jacobs try sprinting.

When Jacobs was ten, he began competing in athletics. He preferred sprinting until he discovered the long jump in 2011.

== Personal life ==
Jacobs lives in Rome with his wife, Nicole Daza, and their two children. Jacobs has another son, born from a previous relationship when Jacobs was nineteen.

Jacobs had been estranged from his father since he was an infant; however, in 2020, he reestablished a relationship with him at the suggestion of his mental coach. He said that reconciling with his father gave him the motivation and peace of mind he needed to focus on winning in the Olympics.

== Career ==
=== Long jump ===
In 2016, Jacobs won the Italian Athletics Championships in long jump. With a personal best of 8.07 meters, he ranked tenth on the IAAF (now World Athletics) world-leading list at the end of the 2017 indoor season.

At the 2016 Italian U23 Championships, he jumped 8.48 meters, the best performance ever for an Italian, although this result was not recognized as a national record due to a 2.8 m/s tailwind, which was 0.8 m/s above the allowable maximum for any record performance.

Jacobs did not participate in the 2016 Summer Olympics due to a hamstring injury.

=== Sprinting ===
In 2019, Jacobs decided to focus his efforts exclusively on sprinting, citing frequent injuries while long jumping among the reasons for this switch.

In July 2019, Jacobs lowered his 100 metres personal best to 10.03 seconds, making him the third-fastest Italian in history.

On 6 March 2021, Jacobs won the 60 metres European title at the 2021 European Athletics Indoor Championships held in Toruń, Poland, setting a new national record and worldwide season-best with a time of 6.47 seconds.

On 13 May 2021, in Savona, Italy, Jacobs set the Italian record in the 100 metres with a time of 9.95 seconds, becoming the 150th person in history and the second Italian, after Filippo Tortu, to break the 10-second barrier. On 26 June 2021, into a headwind of −1.0 m/s in Rovereto, he broke the Italian championship record with a time of 10.01 seconds, winning his fourth national title in a row.

==== 2020 Olympics ====
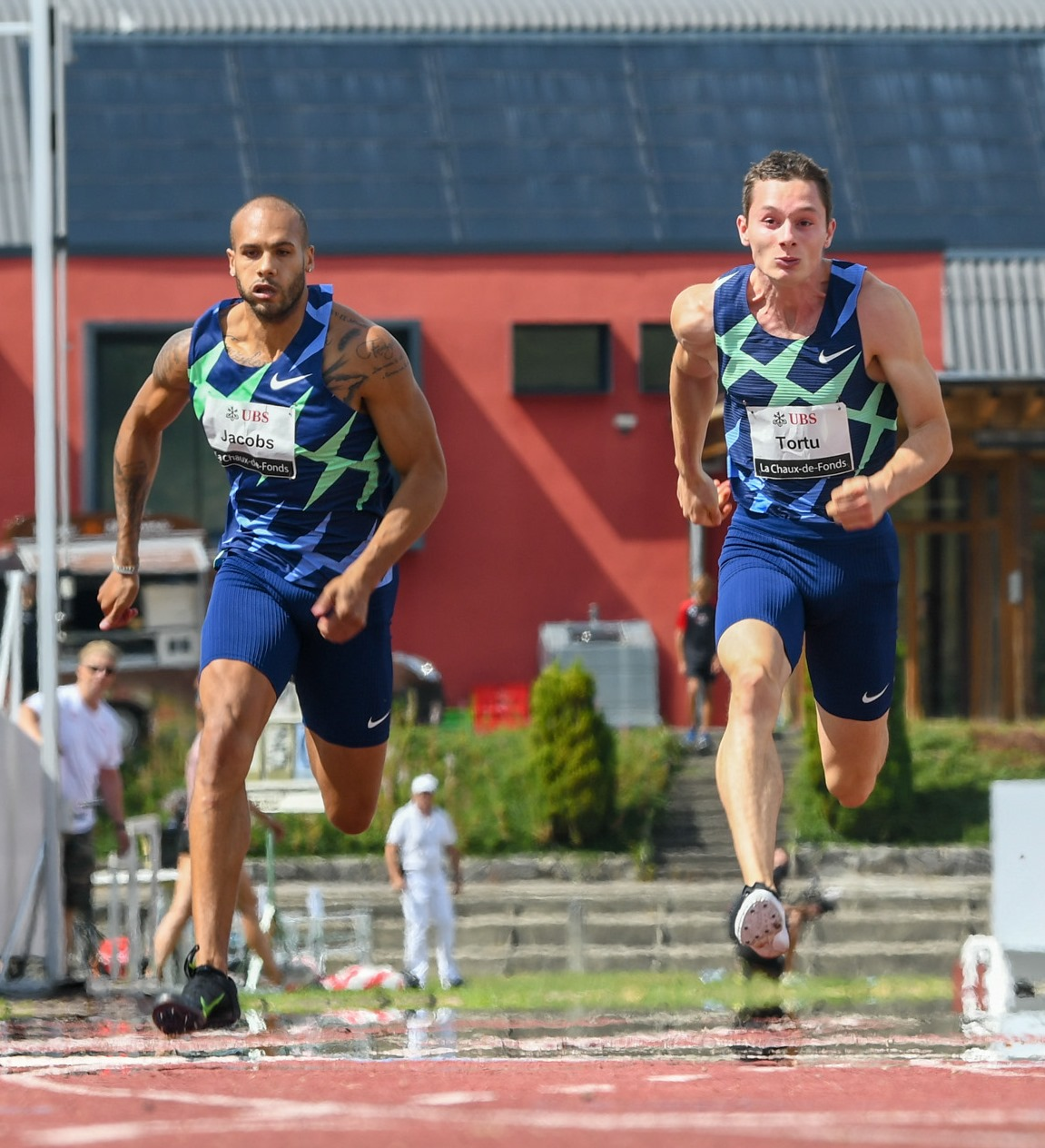
Jacobs (left) and teammate Filippo Tortu at Resisprint 2020.

Jacobs won his first 100 metres heat at the 2020 Tokyo Olympics in 9.94 seconds, improving his own Italian record by 0.01. In the semi-final, he was third with a time of 9.84 seconds, setting a new European record and qualifying for the final with the third overall fastest time. He is the first Italian to ever reach an Olympic 100 m final.

In the final, Jacobs won the gold medal with a time of 9.80 seconds, beating Fred Kerley (9.84) and Andre De Grasse (9.89). Jacobs is the first Italian to win the gold medal in the event, and the first European to win since Linford Christie won the event at the 1992 Olympics in Barcelona.

His effort broke the European record he set in the semi-final earlier that day, recording the fastest time ever run by an athlete that is neither American nor Jamaican. Due to this performance, Jacobs is tied with Steve Mullings as the 10th fastest man of all time. Jacobs was not favored to win the race, with bookmakers giving him a three percent chance of winning.

Jacobs later won a second gold medal in the 4 × 100 metres as part of the Italian relay team, along with Lorenzo Patta, Fausto Desalu and Filippo Tortu. It was the first time Italy had ever won this event, and also the first time Italy had earned a medal in the event in 73 years. Jacobs ran the team's second leg (split time: 8.925), contributing to its total run time of 37.50 seconds, setting a new Italian record.

Due to his outstanding achievements, Jacobs was selected by the Italian Olympic Committee to be Italy's flag bearer during the Olympics closing ceremony.

Jacobs ended his season shortly after the Olympics, citing fatigue, and cancelling two upcoming Diamond League appearances.

After the Games, it was reported that Giacomo Spazzini, who had worked as Jacobs' nutritionist, was involved in a steroid investigation in Italy. In response, Jacobs' agent stated that the athlete had cut ties with Spazzini several months before the Olympics. In 2022, the investigators established that Spazzini himself was a victim of collaboration with a person who turned out to be a fake doctor: the biologist Antonio Armiento who negotiated a sentence of 1 year and 11 months and 20 days for falsely declaring he was a doctor and free prescription of antihistamines and diuretics.

==== 2021/2022 indoor season ====
Jacobs returned to competition in February 2022, winning the 60 m race at the ISTAF Indoor in Berlin with a time of 6.51. In subsequent races, which included winning the national 60 m indoor title, he lowered his season best to 6.49, arriving at the world indoor championships in Belgrade with the 5th fastest time in the season. In his semi-final he equalled the world leading time of 6.45, held by pre-championship favorite and world record holder Christian Coleman and Bahamian sprinter Terrence Jones, setting a new national record. In the final he edged Coleman by 3 thousands of a second setting a new European record of 6.41, winning the gold medal and becoming the 4th fastest man in history on such distance.

==== 2022 outdoor season ====
Jacobs was supposed to start his outdoor season competing in the 100 metres at the 2022 Kip Keino Classic in Nairobi, Kenya, however he missed his debut after being hospitalised for a gastrointestinal infection. He officially opened his outdoor season with a time of 10.04, winning an international meet in Savona, after changing his original plan of competing in the 200 metres. Having sustained a slight injury to his biceps femoris, he took the decision to withdraw from three Diamond League meets which were on his calendar.

Having had to withdraw before the semi-finals of the 2022 World Championships due to a thigh injury, at the 2022 European Championships in Munich, Jacobs won the 100 m final in a time of 9.95 seconds, beating reigning champion Zharnel Hughes into the second position (9.99s), with Jeremiah Azu completing the podium with a time of 10.13.

== Statistics ==
=== European records ===
- 100 metres: 9.80 (+0.1 m/s; (Japan) Tokyo, 1 August 2021). Current holder
- 60 metres: 6.41 ( (Serbia) Belgrade, 19 March 2022). Current holder

=== National records ===
- 4 × 100 m relay: 37.50 ( (Japan) Tokyo, 6 August 2021), he ran second leg in the team with Lorenzo Patta, Fausto Desalu, Filippo Tortu.

=== Progression ===
100 m

Year	Performance	Venue	Date
2011	11.19	(Italy) Chiari	20 May
2012	10.68	(Italy) Campi Bisenzio	19 May
2013	11.19	(Switzerland) Chiasso	19 August
2014	10.53	(Italy) Gavardo	18 May
2016	10.23	(Italy) Savona	25 May
2017	10.82	(Italy) Trieste	30 June
2018	10.08	(Italy) Savona	23 May
2019	10.03	(Italy) Padua	16 July
2020	10.10	(Italy) Trieste	1 August
2021	9.80	(Japan) Tokyo	1 August
2022	9.95	(Germany) Munich	16 August
2023	10.05	(Hungary) Budapest	20 August
2024	9.85	(France) Saint-Denis	4 August
2025	10.16	(Japan) Tokyo	14 September
2026	9.96	(France) Paris	28 June

=== International competition ===
Year	Competition	Venue	Position	Event	Performance	Notes
2016	Mediterranean U23 Championships	(Tunisia) Tunis	1st	Long jump	7.95 m	PB
2016	European Championships	(Netherlands) Amsterdam	11th	Long jump	7.59 m	
2017	European Indoor Championships	(Serbia) Belgrade	Qual.	Long jump	7.70 m	
2018	European Championships	(Germany) Berlin	11th (sf)	100 m	10.28	
2019	European Indoor Championships	(United Kingdom) Glasgow	Qual.	Long jump	NM	
2019	IAAF World Relays	(Japan) Yokohama	Final	4 × 100 m relay	DNF	
2019	World Championships	(Qatar) Doha	19th (sf)	100 m	10.20	
2019	World Championships	(Qatar) Doha	10th (sf)	4 × 100 m relay	38.11	NR
2021	European Indoor Championships	(Poland) Toruń	1st	60 m	6.47	WL, NR
2021	World Relays	(Poland) Chorzów	1st	4 × 100 m relay	39.21	
2021	Olympic Games	(Japan) Tokyo	1st	100 m	9.80	AR
2021	Olympic Games	(Japan) Tokyo	1st	4 × 100 m relay	37.50	WL, NR
2022	World Indoor Championships	(Serbia) Belgrade	1st	60 m	6.41	WL, AR
2022	World Championships	(United States) Eugene	N/A (sf)	100 m	10.04	DNS
2022	European Championships	(Germany) Munich	1st	100 m	9.95	CR, SB
2023	European Indoor Championships	(Turkey) Istanbul	2nd	60 m	6.50	
2023	World Championships	(Hungary) Budapest	12th (sf)	100 m	10.05	SB
2023	World Championships	(Hungary) Budapest	2nd	4 × 100 m relay	37.62	SB
2024	World Relays	(The Bahamas) Nassau	Final	4 × 100 m relay	DQ	
2024	European Championships	(Italy) Rome	1st	100 m	10.02	SB
2024	European Championships	(Italy) Rome	1st	4 × 100 m relay	37.82	EL
2024	Olympic Games	(France) Paris	5th	100 m	9.85	SB

=== Other meetings ===
Year	Competition	Venue	Position	Event	Performance	Notes
2021	BAUHAUS-galan	(Sweden) Stockholm	2nd	100 m	10.05	
2021	Herculis	(Monaco) Montecarlo	3rd	100 m	9.99	
2022	ISTAF Indoor	(Germany) Berlin	1st	60 m	6.51	
2022	ORLEN Cup	(Poland) Łódź	1st	60 m	6.49	SB
2023	ORLEN Cup	(Poland) Łódź	1st	60 m	6.57	SB
2023	Liévin International Meeting	(France) Liévin	2nd	60 m	6.57	SB
2023	Hanžeković Memorial	(Croatia) Zagreb	3rd	100 m	10.08	
2024	East Coast Relays	(United States) Jacksonville	2nd	100 m	10.11	
2024	Golden Spike	(Czech Republic) Ostrava	3rd	100 m	10.19	

=== National competitions ===
Year	Competition	Venue	Position	Event	Performance	Notes
2016	U23 Italian Athletics Championships	(Italy) Brixen	1st	Long jump	8.48 m	PB, w
2016	Italian Athletics Championships	(Italy) Rieti	1st	Long jump	8.07 m	PB*
2017	Italian Athletics Indoor Championships	(Italy) Rieti	1st	Long jump	8.06 m	*
2018	Italian Athletics Championships	(Italy) Pescara	1st	100 m	10.24	*
2019	Italian Athletics Championships	(Italy) Brixen	1st	100 m	10.10	*
2020	International Triveneto meeting	(Italy) Trieste	1st	100 m	10.10	
2020	Italian Athletics Championships	(Italy) Brixen	1st	100 m	10.10	w*
2021	Italian Athletics Indoor Championships	(Italy) Ancona	1st	60 m	6.55	*
2021	International Savona meeting	(Italy) Savona	1st	100 m	9.95	NR
2021	Italian Athletics Championships	(Italy) Rovereto	1st	100 m	10.01	CR*
2022	Italian Athletics Indoor Championships	(Italy) Ancona	1st	60 m	6.55	*
2022	Italian Athletics Championships	(Italy) Rieti	1st	100 m	10.12	*
2023	Italian Athletics Indoor Championships	(Italy) Ancona	2nd	60 m	6.55	SB*
2024	Roma Sprintfestival	(Italy) Rome	1st	100 m	10.07	

* Denotes senior level national champion.

=== National titles ===
Jacobs won ten national championships at individual senior level.

- Italian Athletics Championships
  - 100 m: 2018, 2019, 2020, 2021, 2022, 2026 (6)
  - Long jump: 2016 (1)
- Italian Athletics Indoor Championships
  - 60 m: 2021, 2022 (2)
  - Long jump: 2017 (1)

=== Track records ===
As of 24 September 2024, Jacobs holds the following track records for 100 metres.

Location	Time	Windspeed m/s	Date	Notes
Munich	9.95	+0.1	16/08/2022	
Tokyo	9.80	+0.1	01/08/2021	Track record is shared with Carl Lewis (USA) from 24/08/1991.
Turku	9.92	+1.5	18/06/2024	

== See also ==
- List of European records in athletics
- List of Italian records in athletics
- Italian all-time lists - 100 m
- Italian all-time lists - 4 × 100 m relay
- Italian podiums in the Diamond League
- 2018 in 100 metres (45th with 10.08)
- 2019 in 100 metres (33rd with 10.03)
- 2020 in 100 metres (22nd with 10.10)
- Italian national track relay team

Records
Preceded by (Portugal) Francis Obikwelu (France) Jimmy Vicaut	Men's 100 metres European record holder 1 August 2021 – present	Succeeded by Incumbent
