= Max Mandusic =

Italian pole vaulter

Personal information
- National team: Italy
- Born: 12 June 1998 (age 28) Trieste, Italy
- Height: 1.88 m (6 ft 2 in)
- Weight: 77 kg (170 lb)

Sport
- Sport: Athletics
- Event: Pole vault
- Club: Trieste Atletica
- Coached by: Emanuel Margesin

Achievements and titles
- Personal bests: Pole vault outdoor: 5.61 m (2022); Pole vault indoor: 5.55 m (2021)

Max Mandusic (born 12 June 1998) is an Italian pole vaulter who won four national championships, two outdoors (2019 and 2020) and two indoors (2020 and 2021).

== Biography ==
His personal best is 5.55 m indoors in 2021 and 5.61 m outdoors (2022). His club is the Trieste Atletica, and his trainer is Emanuel Margesin.

== National titles ==
Mandusic won 5 national championships at individual senior level.

- Italian Athletics Championships
  - Pole vault: 2019, 2020, 2022 (3)
- Italian Athletics Indoor Championships
  - Pole vault indoor: 2020, 2021
