= Roman Villa Desenzano =

Roman villa in Desenzano, Italy

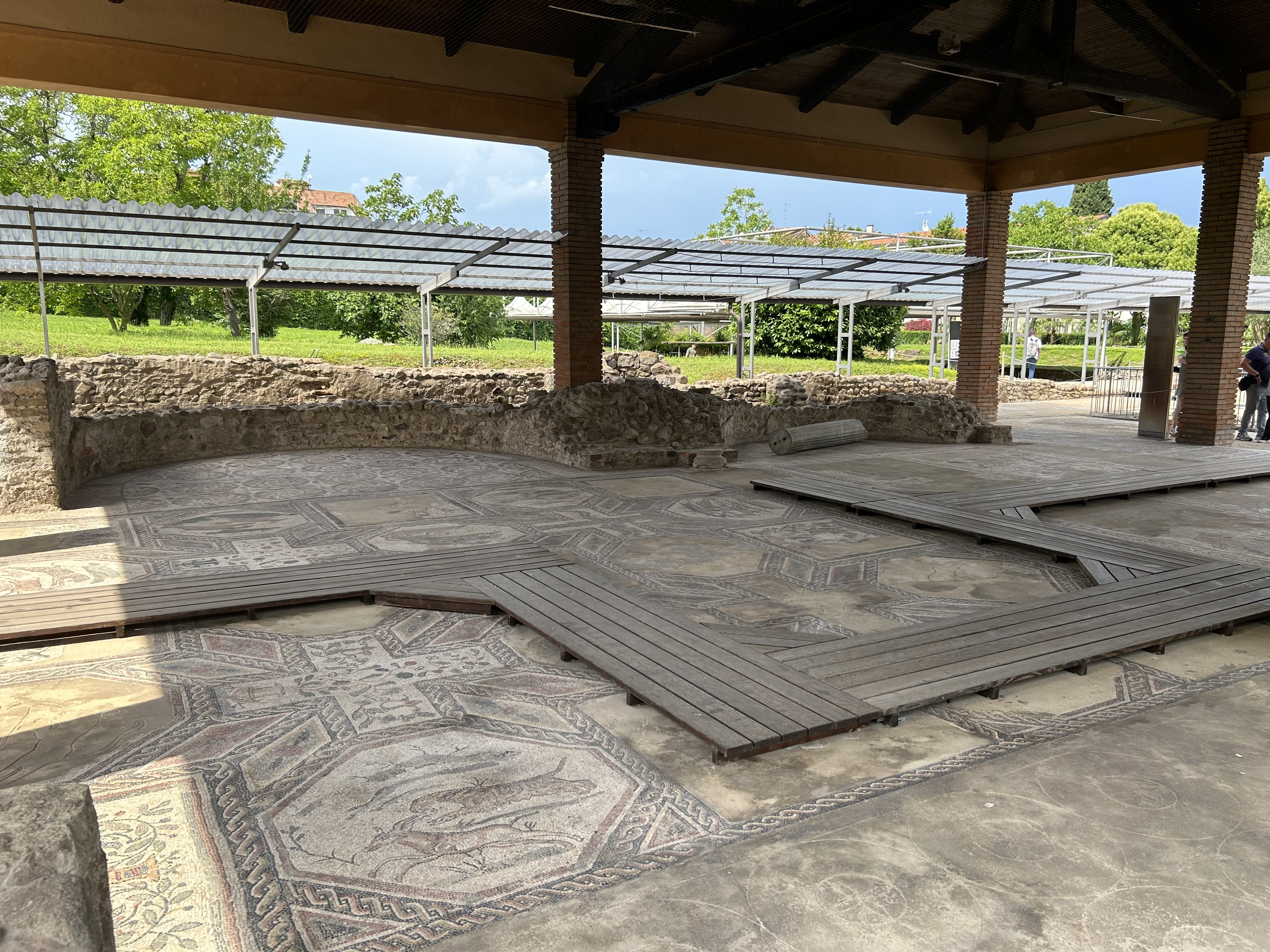
- Interactive map of Roman Villa Desenzano
- 45°28′N 10°32′E
- Location: Desenzano del Garda, Italy

History
- Built: c. 100 BCE

The Roman Villa of Desenzano (Villa romana di Desenzano del Garda), is in the town of Desenzano del Garda on the shore of Lake Garda. It is located in the comune of the province of Brescia, in Lombardy, Italy. It is one of the most important late antiquity Roman villas in northern Italy.

it is possible that the person who ordered the final stage of the building works of the villa was Flavius Magnus Decentius, brother of the Emperor Magnentius (350 – 353 A.C.), from whom the city of Desenzano takes its name today.

== History of discovery ==
The building, built at the end of the first century BCE, has known several building phases: what is visible today, however, dates back to the first half of the fourth century AD.

The villa was discovered in 1921, when during the ground construction for the foundations of a house, polychrome mosaics came to light. It was therefore decided to suspend the work and the authorisation of the Italian Ministry of Education was obtained that the whole area be expropriated and the excavation began.

== Structure overview ==
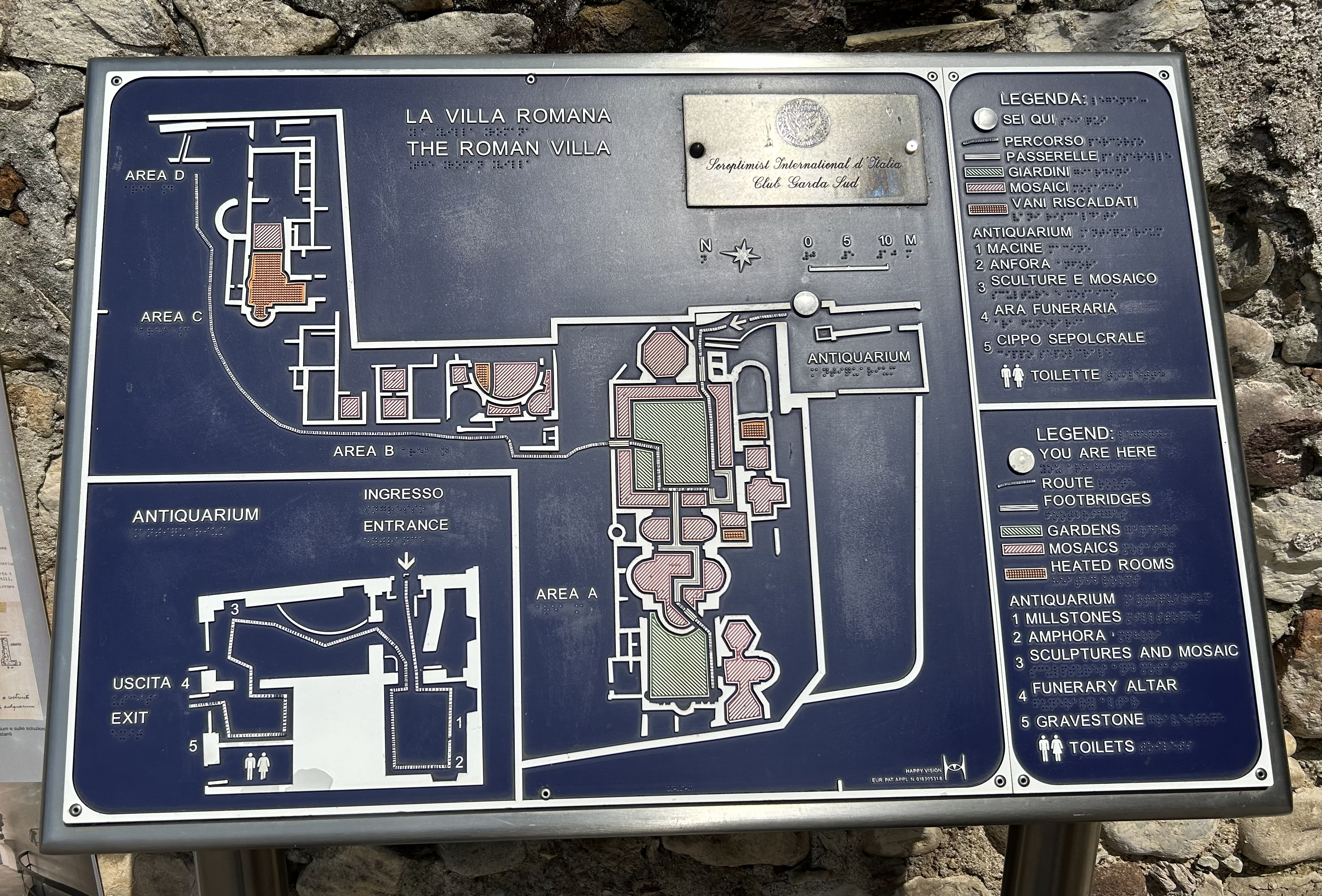
Plan of Roman Villa at Densenzano, Lake Garda, Italy

The excavations revealed the existence of four areas:

- Area A
- Area B
- Area C
- Area D

In addition, subsequently, a fifth space was built: the Antiquarium. The museum of the Villa, which houses the materials found during the excavations, was carefully built over this area and the hypercaust can still be seen.

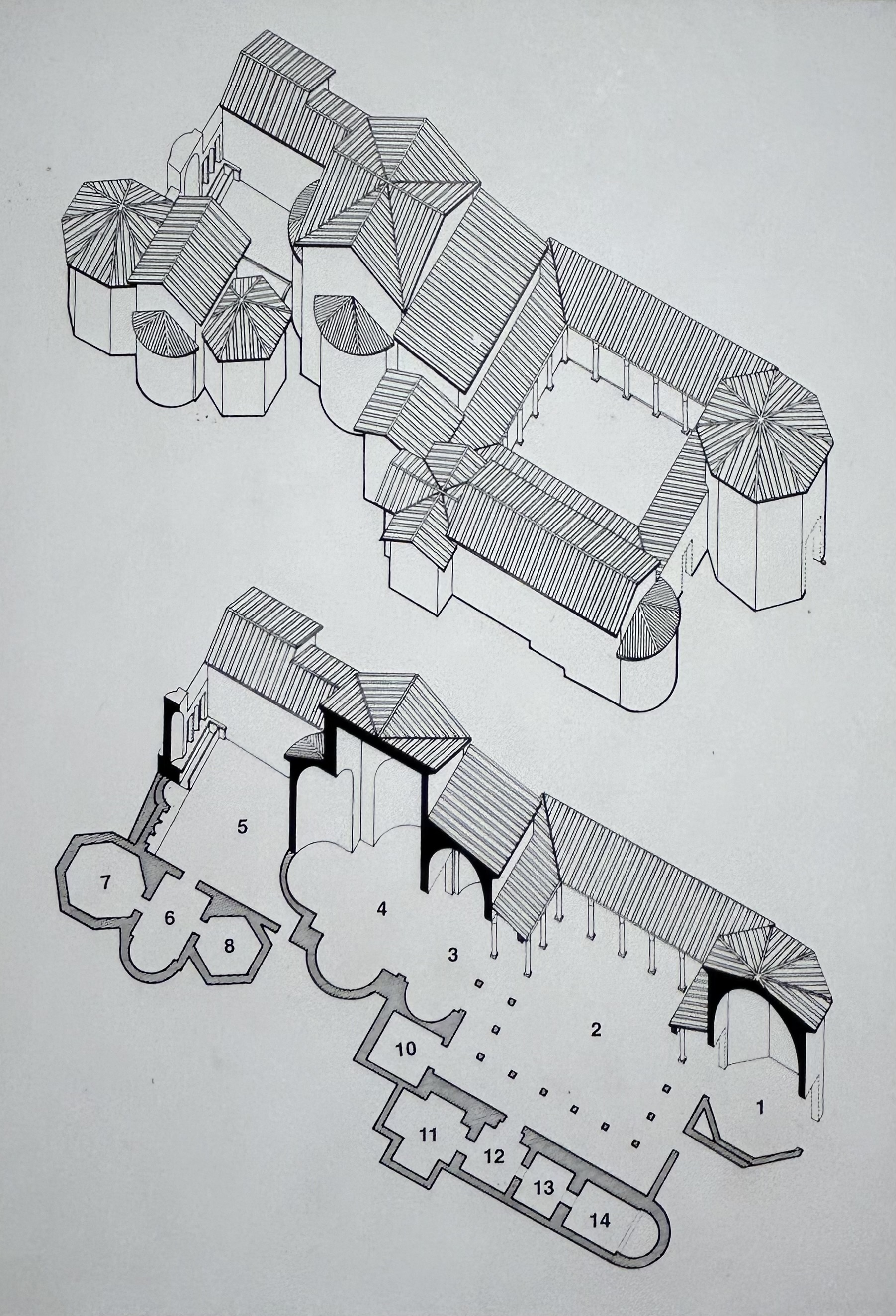
Villa Romana Desenzano 3D reconstruction

=== Area A ===
Area A is organised along the east–west axial direction. To the east, overlooking the lake, there is an octagonal vestibule paved with geometric mosaics, which was used as a place of entertainment for the guests of the Villa. The neighbouring peristyle was bounded by portries with more than twenty columns distributed along the perimeter, of which only a couple have survived. From the peristyle you enter the sumptuous three-apse triclinium, which has the better preserved floor.

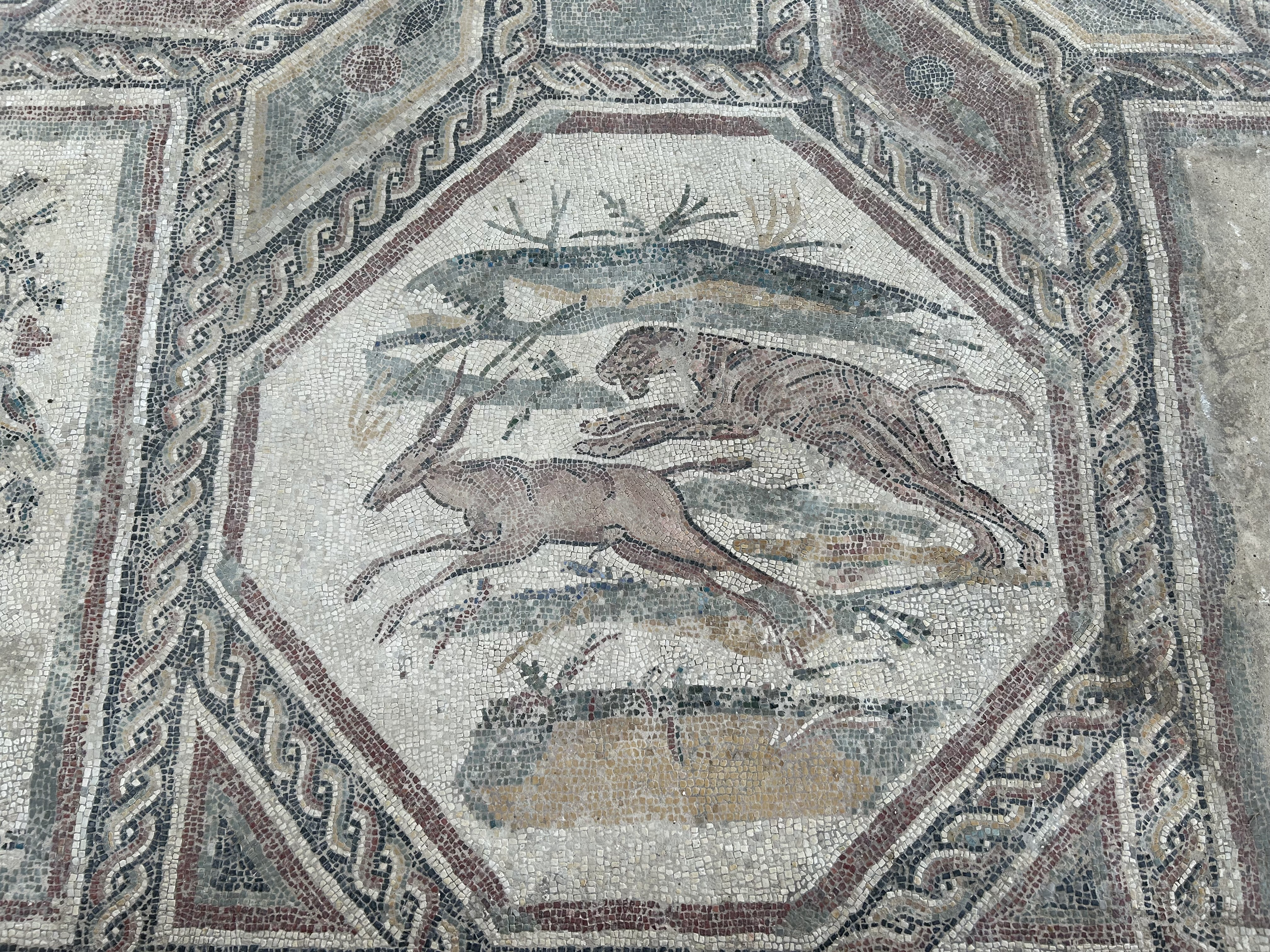
Mosaics in Villa Romana, Densenzano, Lake Garda, Italy

The depictions consist of hunting scenes inscribed in octagonal spaces, harvest and fruit picking scenes in square spaces and finally crosses depicting flowering branches starting from craters. From the triabsided room you could access a garden closed by a nymphaeo, that is, a fountain that was enriched by seven niches that were used for the collection of water. This part of the villa was restored between 1928 and 1930 when the structures and mosaics had now suffered a major deterioration.

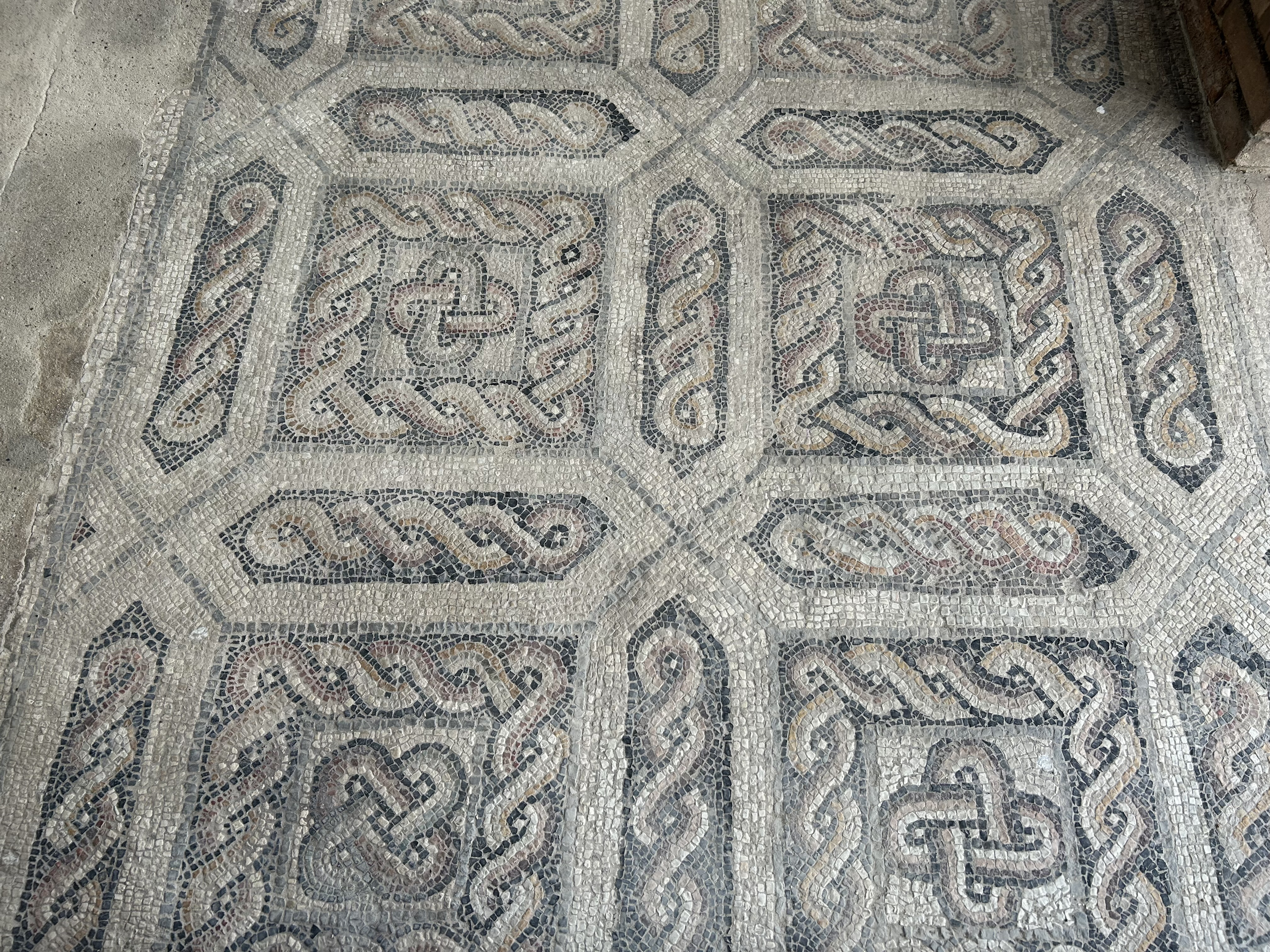
Mosaics in Villa Romana, Densenzano, Lake Garda, Italy

=== Area B ===
Like Area A, Area B also develops along the east–west directional axis. In this sector you can see the apse of a large compartment with marble floor, and other rooms with mosaic floor. Some mosaics have a style that can be linked to that of Area A, therefore dating back to the beginning of the fourth century. Later, at the end of the fourth century A.D., however, a renovation was carried out that left us with more recent mosaics. Probably these rooms were used for meetings and leisure activities. A large apse may have been used for Christian worship.

=== Area C ===
This area, characterised by marble floors and heating systems on the floor and in the walls, probably had a thermal function. This part of the Villa was the most damaged by the earthwork works carried out in the seventies.

=== Area D ===
This area was only begun in 1988 and excavations were hampered by significant damage from modern construction nearby.

=== The Antiquarium ===
On 19 December 1971, the Antiquarium was inaugurated with an exhibition hall at the entrance to the archeological area. This museum room houses: coins, paintings, statues and all the objects from the excavations of the villa. One striking find was the mid-2nd century statue of Hercules.

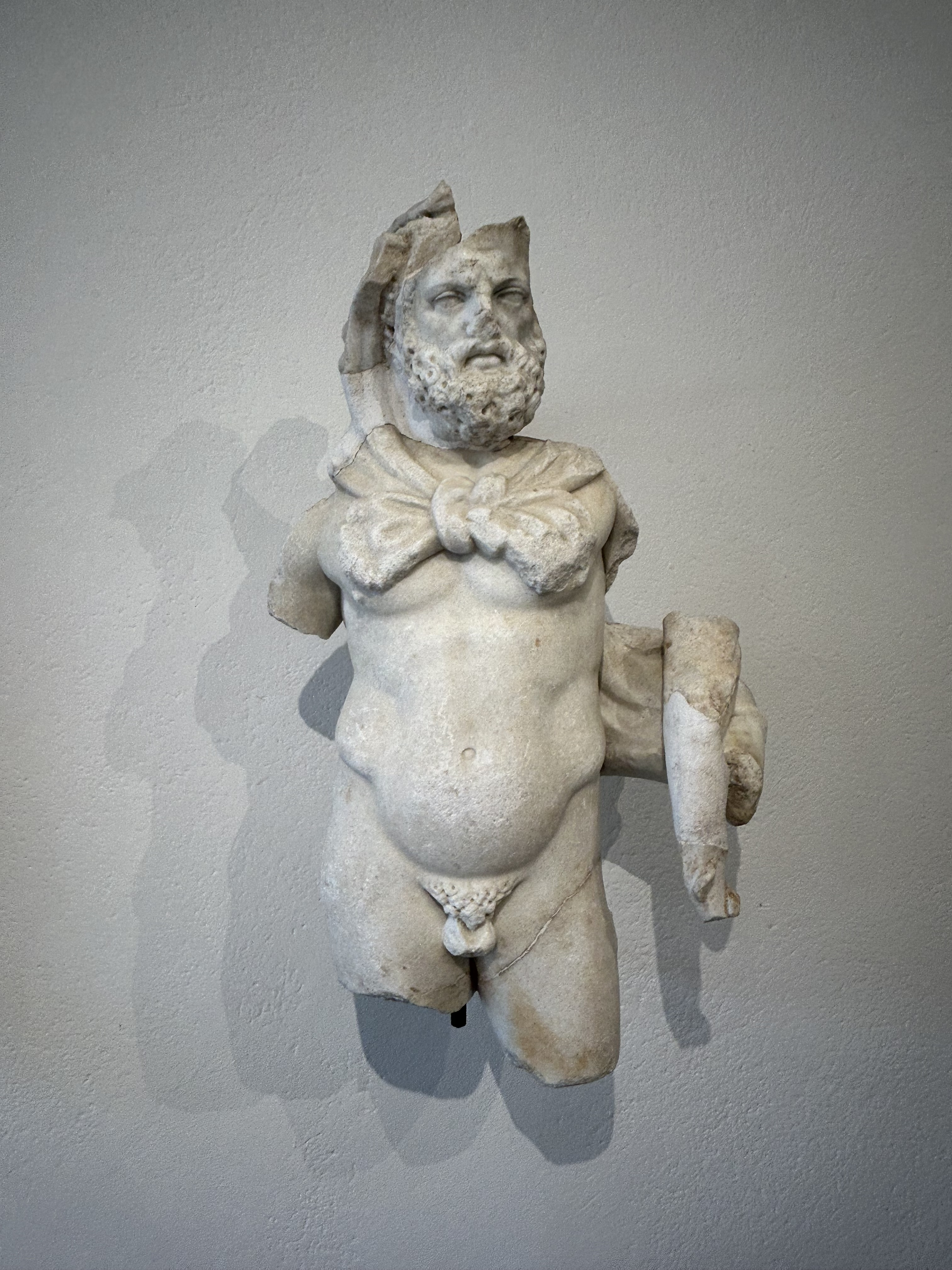
Statue of Hercules excavated at Villa Romana Densenzano

=== Gardens ===
A garden situated at the eastern end of Area A, would have been in a peristyle with viridarium. It is here a glass cup discovered in 1963 was found depicting Christ in the scene of Peter's threefold denial (Matthew XXVI, 34). It is a rare mid-4th century example of Christianity in the Roman Empire.

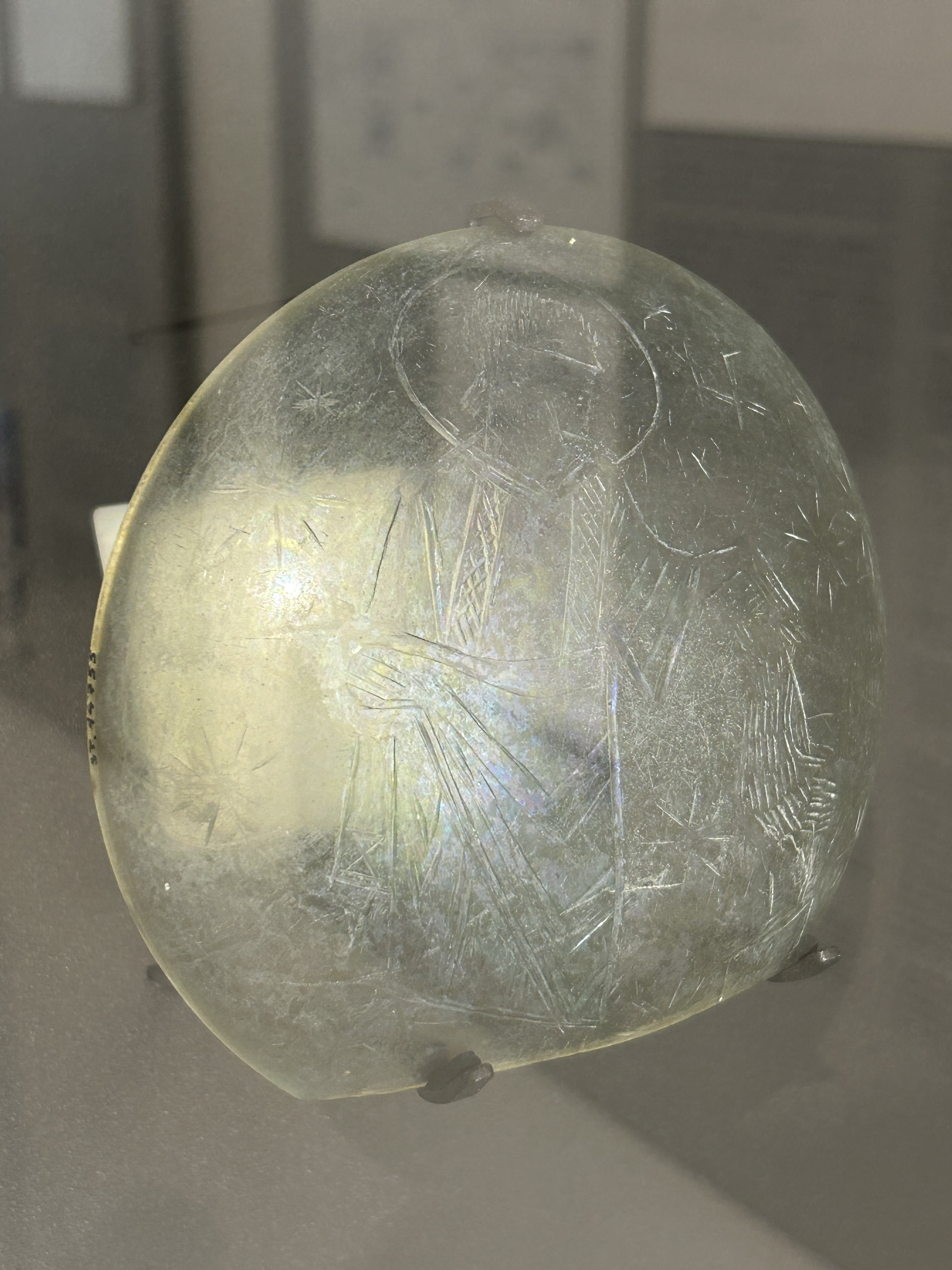
Christian glass bowl excavated at Roman Villa, Densenzano
