= 2022 Italian Athletics Championships =

Edition of the Italian Athletics Championships

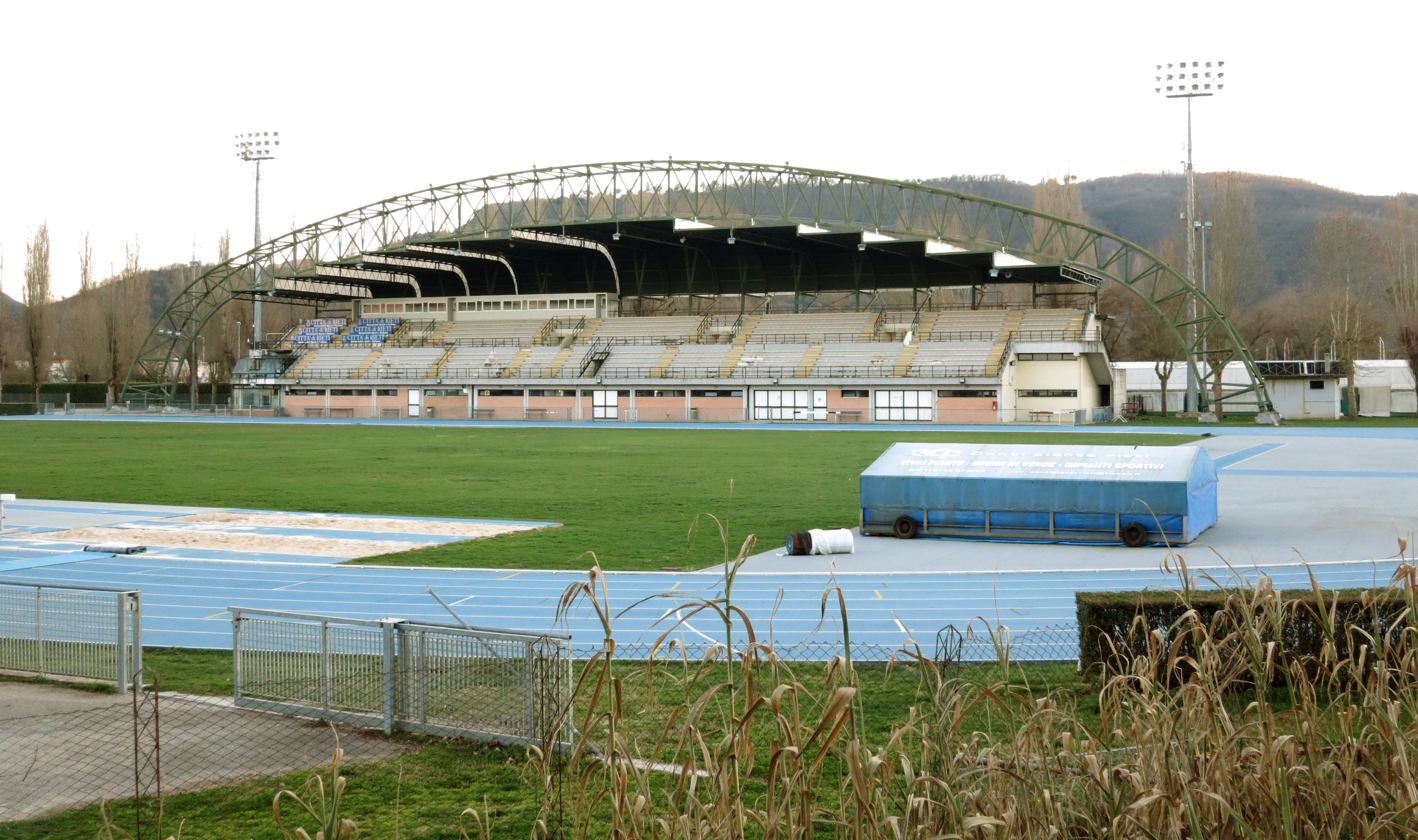
- Raul Guidobaldi Stadium in Rieti, city that hosted championships for the third time (2003, 2016, 2022).
- Dates: 24–26 June (main event)
- Host city: Rieti (track & field); Pescara (35 km racewalk); Alberobello (20 km racewalk); Trieste (cross country); Brescia (10,000 m)
- Level: Senior
- Events: 38 (track & field); 2 (35 km racewalk); 2 (20 km racewalk); 4 (cross country); 2 (10,000 m)

The 2022 Italian Athletics Championships was the 112th edition of the Italian Athletics Championships and took place in Rieti, Lazio (Stadio Raul Guidobaldi), from 24 to 26 June.

The Italian championships of the men's and women's 35 km racewalk took place in Pescara on January 16. The cross country championships took place in Trieste on 12 and 13 March. The 10,000m championships took place in Brescia on May 1.

== Champions ==
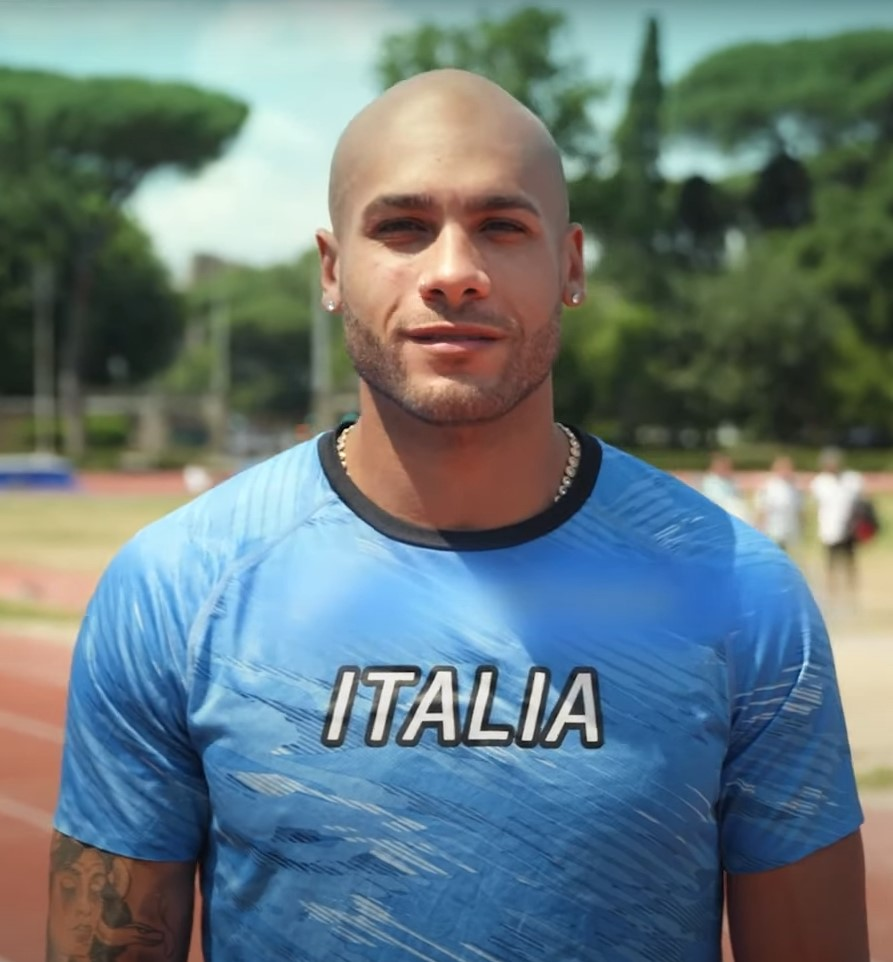
Marcell Jacobs, returning after an injury, confirmed himself as the Italian 100 m champion for the 5th year in a row.

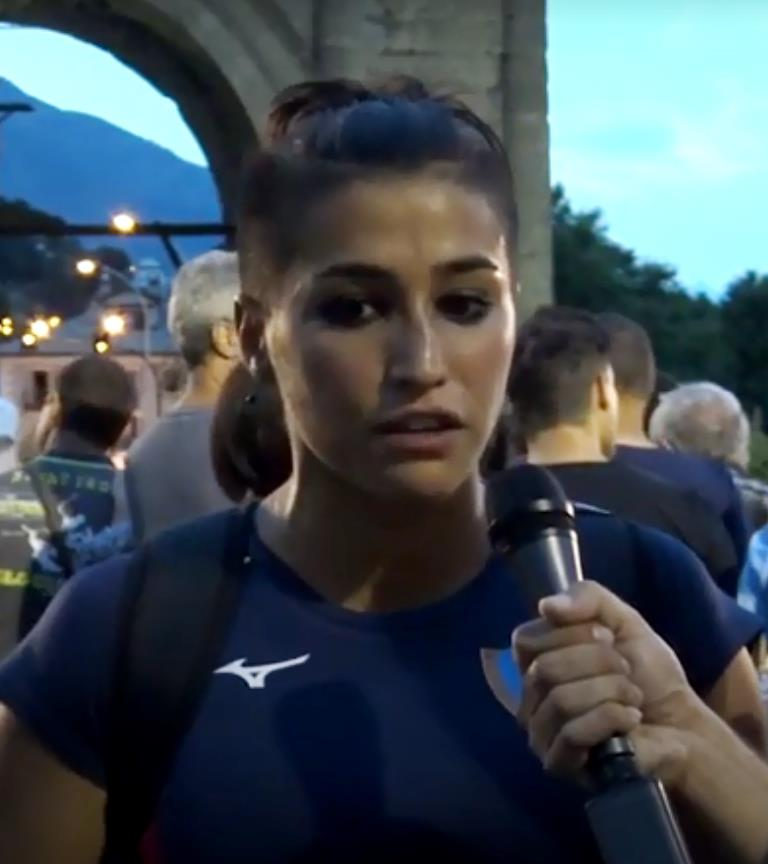
Roberta Bruni, with 4.55 m in pole vault, set the championship record.

=== Track & Field + 10 km walk (Rieti 24-26 June) ===
Track events
| Event | Men | Performance | Women | Performance |
| 100 m | Marcell Jacobs | 10.12 | Zaynab Dosso | 11.30 |
| 200 m | Diego Pettorossi | 20.54 PB | Dalia Kaddari | 22.88 |
| 400 m | Edoardo Scotti | 45.69 SB | Alice Mangione | 51.65 |
| 800 m | Catalin Tecuceanu | 1:46.62 | Eloisa Coiro | 2:03.23 SB |
| 1500 m | Ossama Meslek | 3:44.69 | Ludovica Cavalli | 4:14.14 |
| 5000 m | Yemaneberhan Crippa | 14:05.09 CR | Micol Majori | 16:00.08 PB |
| 110/100 m hs | Hassane Fofana | 13.45 SB | Elisa Di Lazzaro | 13.01 |
| 400 m hs | Mario Lambrughi | 49.22 | Ayomide Folorunso | 54.60 CR PB |
| 3000 m st | Leonardo Feletto | 8:30.06 CR SB | Martina Merlo | 9:51.81 SB |
Road events
| 10 km walk (road) | Francesco Fortunato | 39.59 | Valentina Trapletti | 44.25 PB |
Field events
| High jump | Gianmarco Tamberi | 2.26 m | Elena Vallortigara | 1.98 m SB |
| Pole vault | Max Mandusic | 5.50 m | Roberta Bruni | 4.55 m |
| Long jump | Elias Sagheddu | 7.75 m PB | Larissa Iapichino | 6.64 m SB |
| Triple jump | Andrea Dallavalle | 17.28 m SB | Dariya Derkach | 13.99 m |
| Shot put | Nick Ponzio | 21.34 m | Chiara Rosa | 16.26 m |
| Discus throw | Alessio Mannucci | 60.01 m PB | Daisy Osakue | 63.24 m CR SB |
| Hammer throw | Simone Falloni | 71.32 m | Sara Fantini | 71.57 m |
| Javelin throw | Roberto Orlando | 73.14 m | Paola Padovan | 56.96 m SB |
Combined
| Decathlon/Heptathlon | Dario Dester | 8020 pts | Marta Giovannini | 5425 pts |

=== 35 km walk (Pescara 16 January) ===
| Event | Men | Performance | Women | Performance |
|---|---|---|---|---|
| 35 km | Matteo Giupponi | 2:33:45 | Federica Curiazzi | 2:52:24 |

=== Cross country (Trieste 12-13 March) ===
| Event | Men | Performance | Women | Performance |
|---|---|---|---|---|
| Long course (10/8 km) | Iliass Aouani | 29:46 | Nadia Battocletti | 26:47 |
| Short course (3 km) | Ala Zoghlami | 8:39 | Ludovica Cavalli | 10:02 |

=== 10,000 m (Brescia 1 May) ===
| Event | Men | Performance | Women | Performance |
|---|---|---|---|---|
| 10,000 m | Pietro Riva | 28:41.57 | Anna Arnaudo | 32:46.05 |

=== 20 km walk (Alberobello 1 May) ===
| Event | Men | Performance | Women | Performance |
|---|---|---|---|---|
| 20 km walk | Massimo Stano | 1:21:21 | Valentina Trapletti | 1:29:47 |

== See also ==
- 2022 Italian Athletics Indoor Championships
