= 2019 Italian Athletics Indoor Championships =

- Dates: 15–17 February
- Host city: Ancona
- Venue: Palaindoor di Ancona
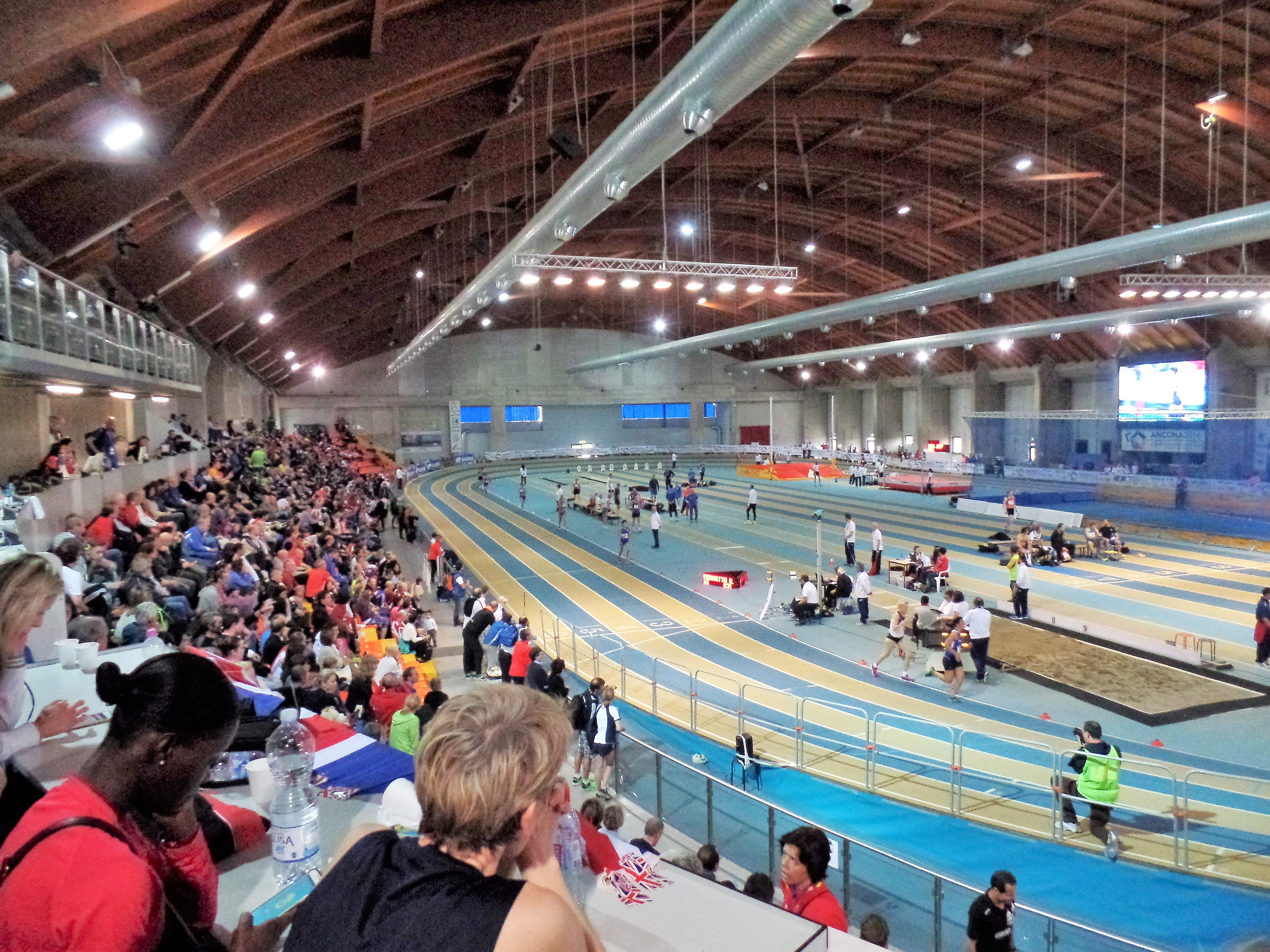
- Level: Senior
- Events: 24

2019 Italian Athletics Indoor Championships was the 50th edition of the Italian Athletics Indoor Championships and were held in Ancona.

== Champions ==
| Event | Men | Performance | Women | Performance |
|---|---|---|---|---|
| 60 m | Luca Lai | 6.71 | Johanelis Herrera | 7.32 |
| 400 m | Michele Tricca | 46.85 | Raphaela Lukudo | 53.13 |
| 800 m | Simone Barontini | 1:48.62 | Elena Bellò | 2:05.58 |
| 1500 m | Enrico Riccobon | 3:44.97 | Giulia Aprile | 4:18.13 |
| 3000 m | Ossama Meslek | 8:15.24 | Margherita Magnani | 9:01.32 |
| 60 m hs | Lorenzo Perini | 7.75 | Luminosa Bogliolo | 8.10 PB |
| 5000/3000 m race walk | Francesco Fortunato | 18:47.63 | Antonella Palmisano | 12:23.15 |
| Long jump | Kevin Ojiaku | 7.87 m | Tania Vicenzino | 6.60 m indoor PB |
| Triple jump | Simone Forte | 16.76 m PB | Francesca Lanciano | 13.57 m indoor PB |
| High jump | Gianmarco Tamberi | 2.32 m | Elena Vallortigara | 1.92 m indoor PB |
| Pole vault | Alessandro Sinno | 5.40 m | Sonia Malavisi | 4.50 m indoor PB |
| Shot put | Leonardo Fabbri | 20.69 PB | Chiara Rosa | 15.72 m |

== See also ==
- 2018 Italian Athletics Championships
