= Desenzano del Garda =

Desenzano del Garda Dezensà (Lombard)
- Comune
- Comune di Desenzano del Garda
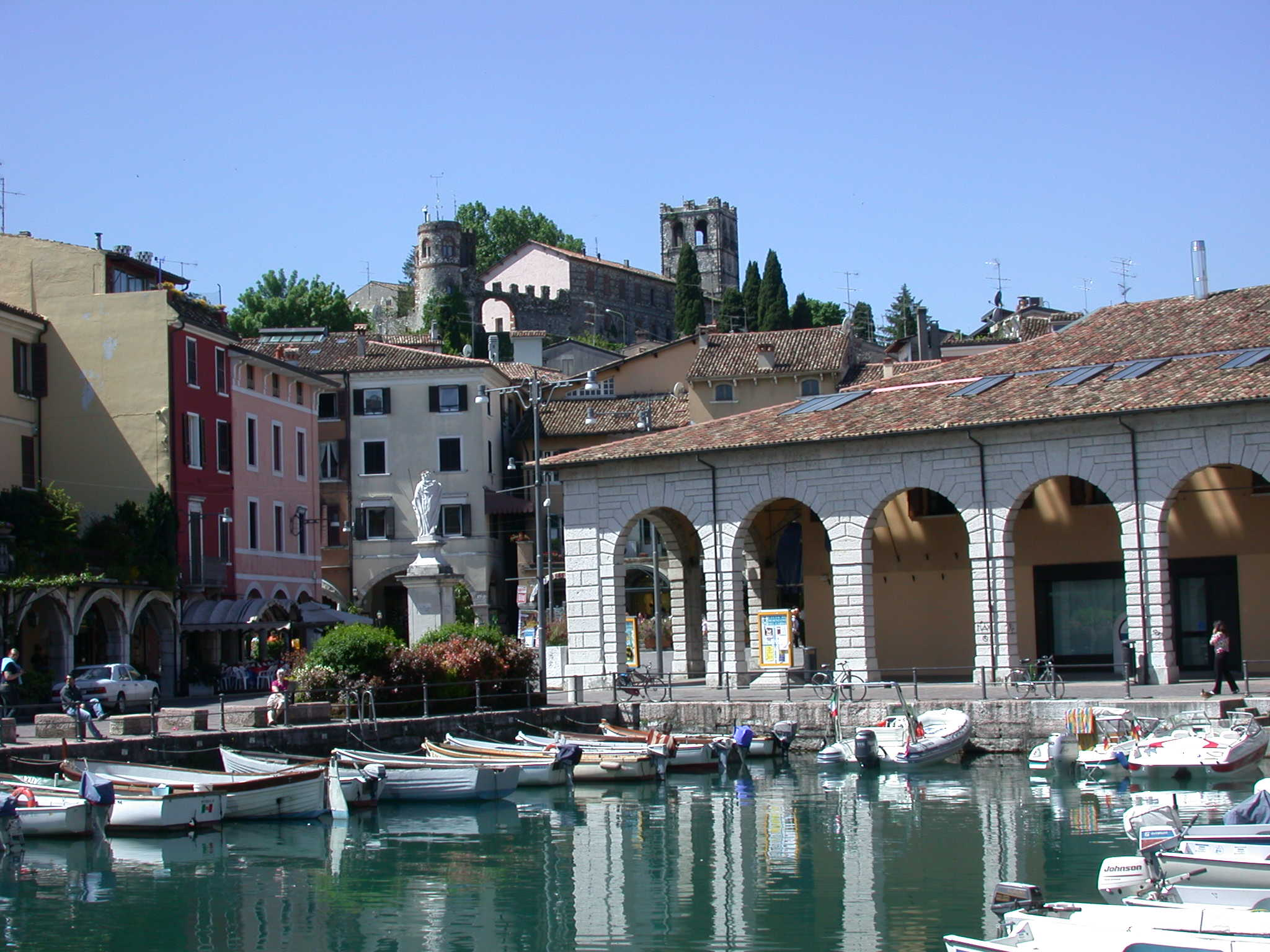
- Desenzano Harbour

- Coat of arms

- Location within Italy Location within Lombardy
- Coordinates: 45°28′N 10°32′E
- Country: Italy
- Region: Lombardy
- Province: Brescia (BS)
- Frazioni: Rivoltella, Vaccarolo, San Martino della Battaglia

Government
  - Mayor: Guido Malinverno (FI)

Area
  - Total: 60.10 km^{2} (23.20 sq mi)
- Elevation: 96 m (315 ft)

Population (2026)
  - Total: 29,416
  - Density: 489.5/km^{2} (1,268/sq mi)
- Demonym: Desenzanesi
- Time zone: UTC+1 (CET)
  - Summer (DST): UTC+2 (CEST)
- Postal code: 25015
- Dialing code: 030
- Website: Official website

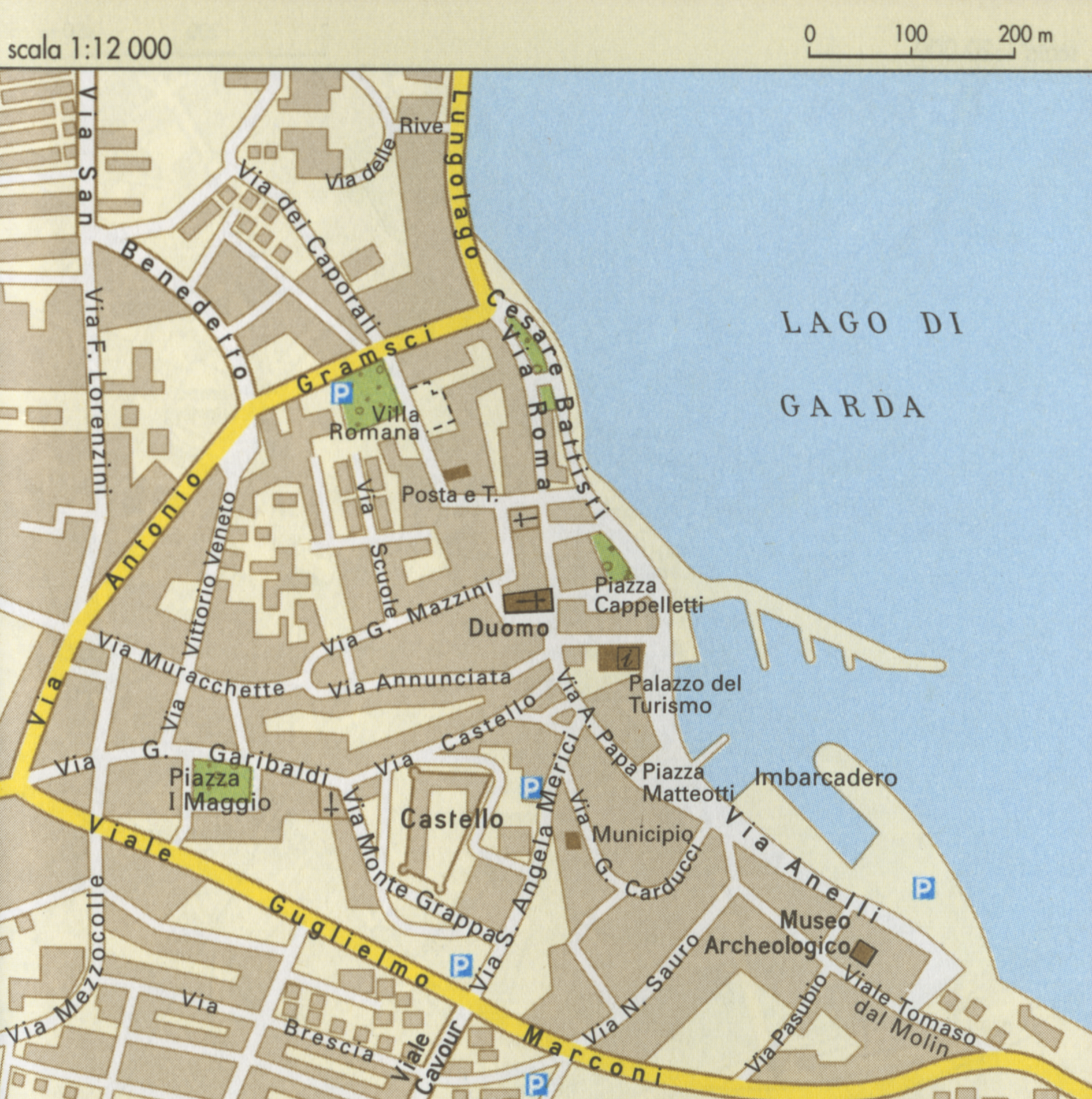
Map of city centre

Desenzano del Garda (Brescian: Dezensà) is a town and comune in the province of Brescia, in Lombardy, Italy, on the southwestern shore of Lake Garda. It borders the communes of Castiglione delle Stiviere, Lonato, Padenghe sul Garda, and Sirmione.

== History ==
The area was settled in the Bronze Age and sometime in the first century BCE, the area around Lake Garda, including what is now Desenzano del Garda, became a favourite vacation spot for the Veronese élite, Verona being one of the largest Roman cities in northeastern Italy.

The toponym Desenzano is supposed to derive from the Latin name of persona Decentius, the alleged owner of the fourth-century Roman farm and villa of which the excavations can be visited. There is also an etymology of popular origin: since the village stretches along the hilly slope, the toponym is connected with the word 'descent'.

The Villa Romana is one of the most important Roman villas in the north of Italy, covering an area of 11,000 square metres. Built in the first century BCE it was occupied through to the fifth century. Discovered in the 1920s, it is believed that the final stage was built by Flavius Magnus Decentius, brother of Emperor Magnentius.

The Castello was built around 1000 CE to protect the populace from raids by bandits and incursions by Hungarians. The fortifications follow the old Roman ‘castrum’ layout and were enlarged in the 15th century.

When the Venetians controlled this part of Italy they rebuilt the Old Port in 1454 to make Desenzano a commercial hub for the wider area with such localities as Brescia, Mantova and Verona.

The baroque cathedral, dedicated to St Mary Magdalene, was designed by Giulio Todeschini and built on the remains of the parish church between 1586 and 1611.

On 24 June 1859, four divisions of Sardinian infantry fought a gruesome battle with elements of the Austrian Eighth corps, under Feldzeugmeister Ludwig von Benedek, in an engagement encompassing Madonna della Scoperta, Pozzolengo, and San Martino (as Desenzano del Garda was known). This action was part of the greater battle centered on Solferino, during the Second Italian War of Independence, and was a vital step in achieving Italian unification – unification that was gained only eleven years later. During the Third Italian War of Independence, Desenzano was bombarded by the Austrian navy.

== Notable residents ==
The Italian poet and librettist Angelo Anelli, who collaborated with Rossini in revising L'italiana in Algeri (The Italian Girl in Algiers) from an earlier text by Luigi Mosca, and whose libretto for Ser Marcantonio by Stefano Pavesi became the basis for Donizetti’s Don Pasquale, was born in Desenzano del Garda in 1761.

Olympic gold medalist, sprinter Marcell Jacobs grew up in Desenzano del Garda. Italian cyclist Sonny Colbrelli and Italian volleyball player Alessandro Michieletto were also born in the town.

== Main sights ==
- The Cathedral of St Mary Magdalene
- The House of St Angela Merici
- The Tower of St Martin (Torre di San Martino)
- The Museum of Archaeology (Museo Civico Archeologico)
- Old Port (Porto Vecchio)
- Roman Villa Densenzano (La Villa Romana)
- The Castle (Castello di Densenzano)

== Tourism ==
The city is a holiday destination in Southern Europe. It attracts tourists from the immediate area owing to its views of the Alps from the southern shore of Lake Garda, its three large beaches (Desenzanino Beach, Spiagga d'Oro, and Porto Rivoltella Beach), and its 27 major hotels.

Desenzano is the heart of nightlife on the southern shore of Lake Garda, with several discos and pubs. In the summer, its main squares, Piazza Malvezzi and Piazza Matteotti, are crowded with people.

At the center of the city are a series of interconnected piazze that house open-air cafés, shops, gelaterie (ice-cream parlours), and bars.

== Transport ==
The city has a main port near the Piazza Giacomo Matteotti, from where several ferries operate. On the south-western outskirts of the city is a large railway station, the Desenzano del Garda-Sirmione railway station (Stazione Ferroviaria), which connects the city to the European railway system. Desenzano also has its own exit from the A4 motorway, the main road between Milan and Venice.

The nearest airports to Desenzano del Garda are:

- Valerio Catullo Airport, located 37 km (23 mi) east.
- Bergamo Orio al Serio Airport, located 78 km (48 mi) northwest.
- Linate Airport, located 110 km (68 mi) west.
- Venice Marco Polo Airport, located 161 km (100 mi) east.
- Malpensa Airport, located 165 km (103 mi) northwest.

== World Heritage Site ==
It is home to one or more prehistoric pile-dwelling (or stilt house) settlements, which are part of the Prehistoric Pile dwellings around the Alps UNESCO World Heritage Site.

== Municipal government ==
Desenzano is headed by a mayor (sindaco) assisted by a legislative body, the consiglio comunale, and an executive body, the giunta comunale. Since 1994 the mayor and members of the consiglio comunale are directly elected together by resident citizens, while from 1946 to 1994 the mayor was chosen by the legislative body. The giunta comunale is chaired by the mayor, who appoints other members, called assessori. The offices of the comune are housed in a building usually called the municipio or palazzo comunale.

Since 1994 the mayor of Desenzano has been directly elected by citizens, originally every four, then every five years. The current mayor is Guido Malinverno (FI), elected on 26 June 2017.

Mayor	Term start	Term end	Party
Massimo Rocca	28 June 1994	7 June 1998	PDS
Felice Anelli	7 June 1998	9 June 2002	FI
Fiorenzo Pienazza	9 June 2002	10 June 2007	DS
Felice Anelli	10 June 2007	21 May 2012	FI
Rosa Leso	21 May 2012	26 June 2017	PD
Guido Malinverno	26 June 2017	incumbent	FI

== Gallery ==
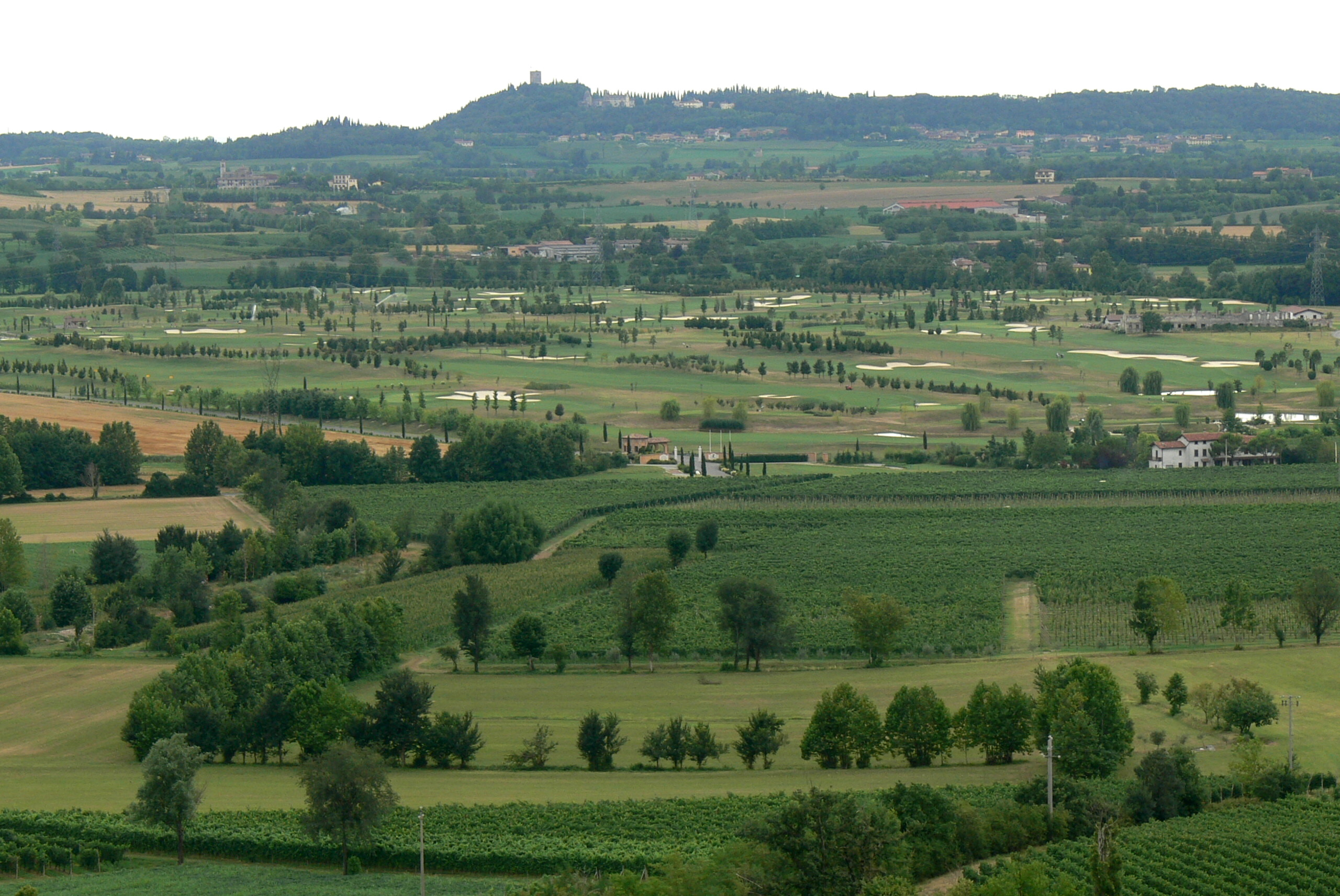
Countryside around Desenzano

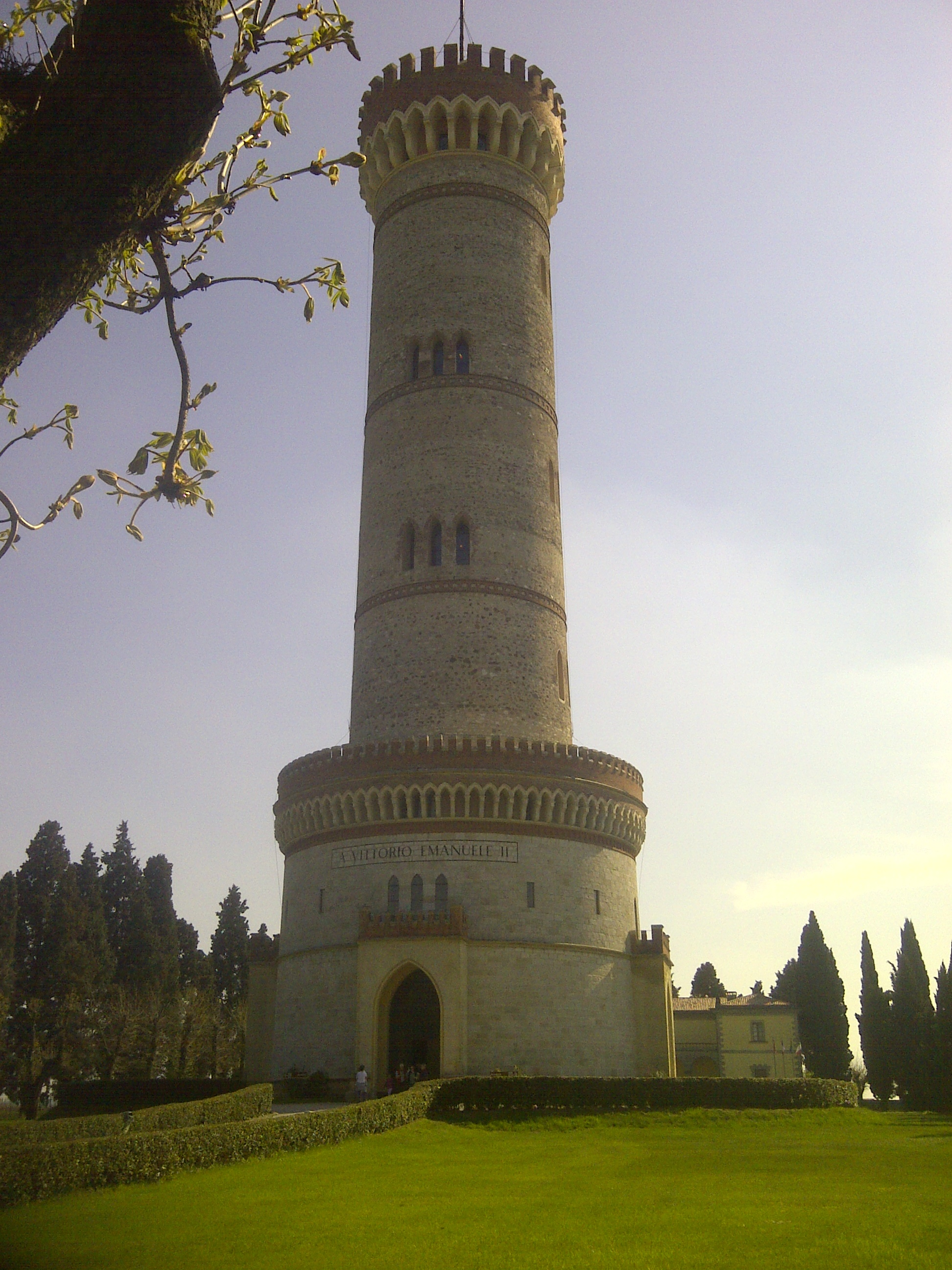
San Martino Tower

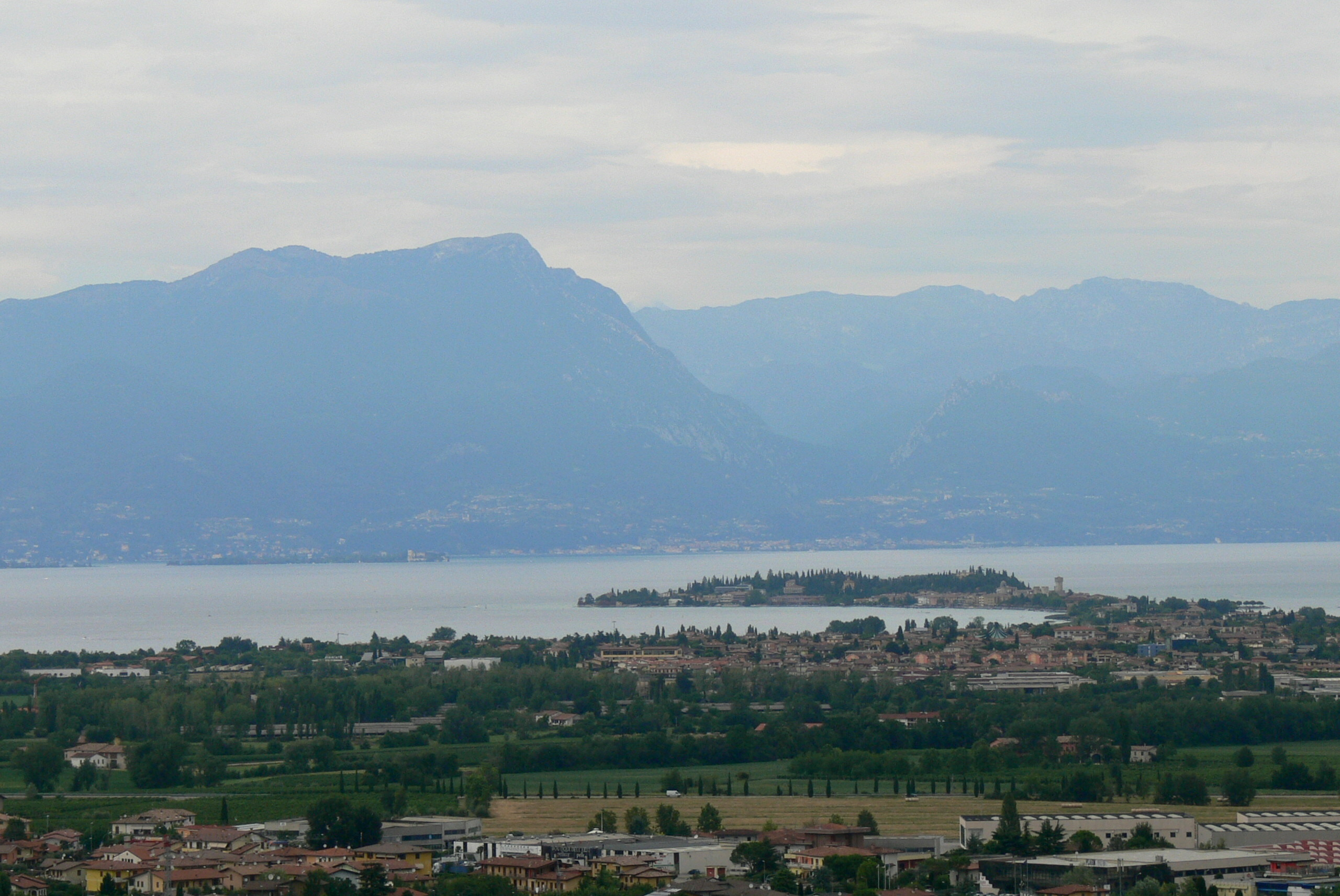
Sirmione peninsula and lake Garda seen from Desenzano

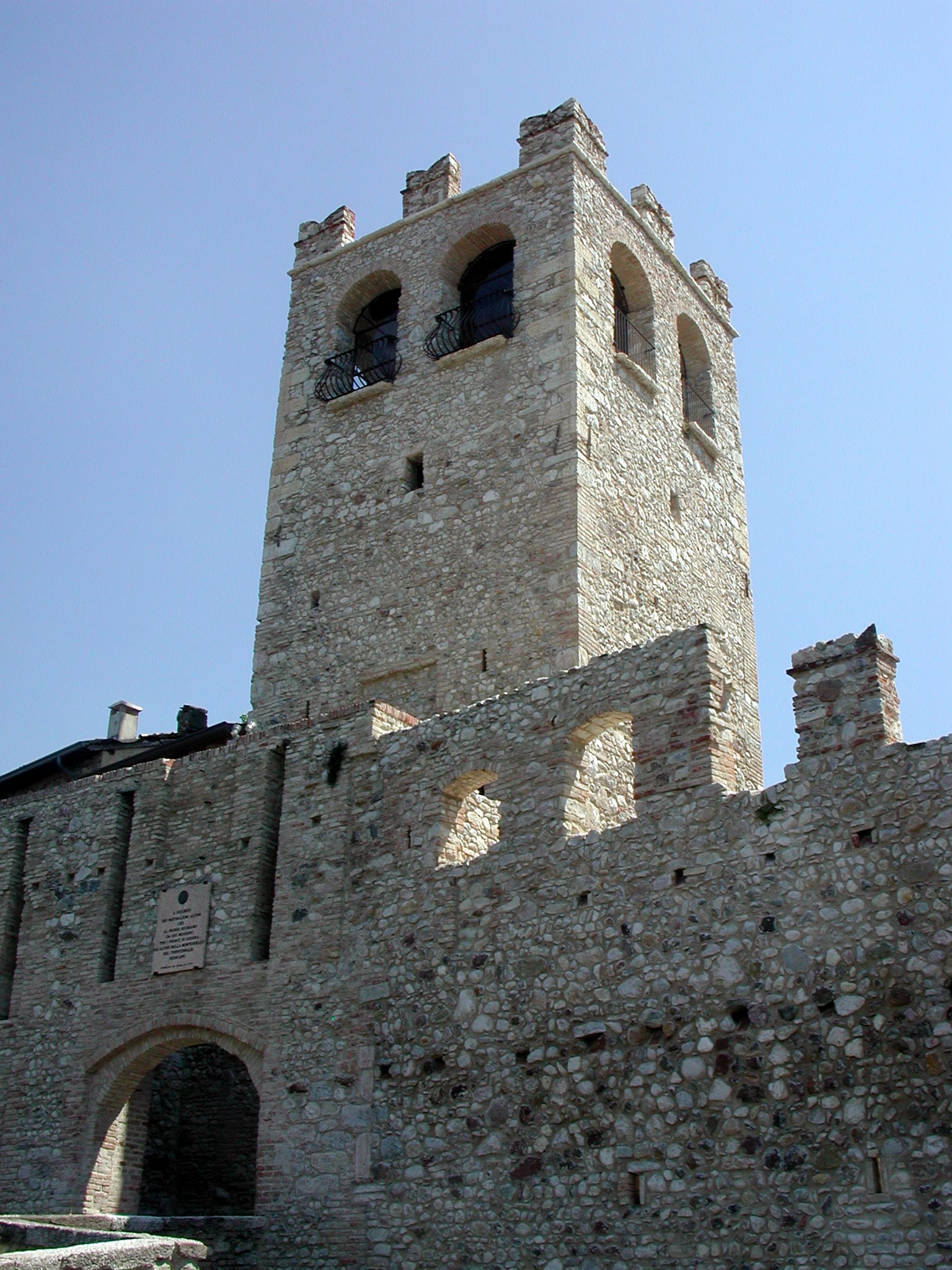
Castle in Desenzano

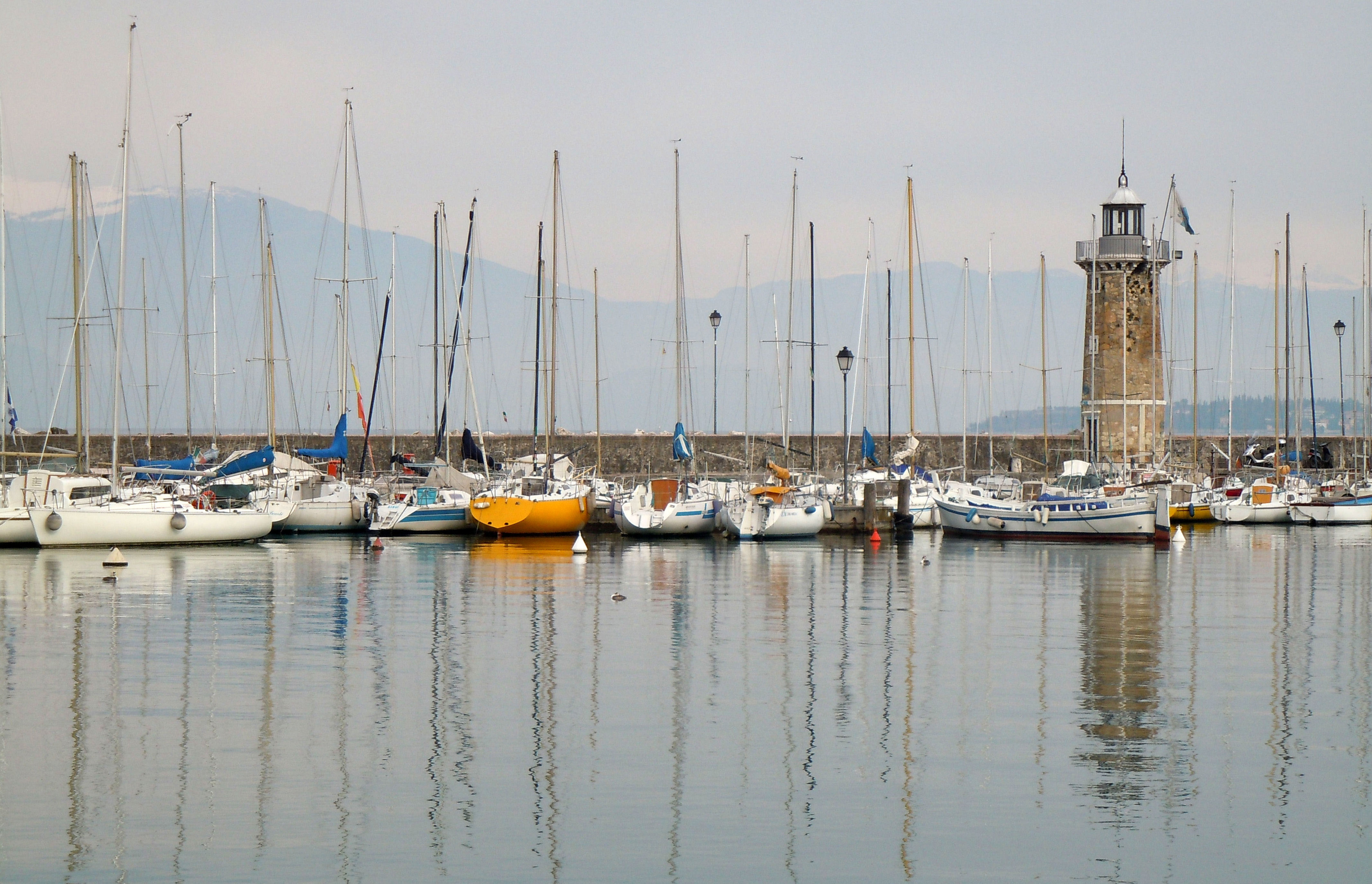
The lighthouse near the harbor

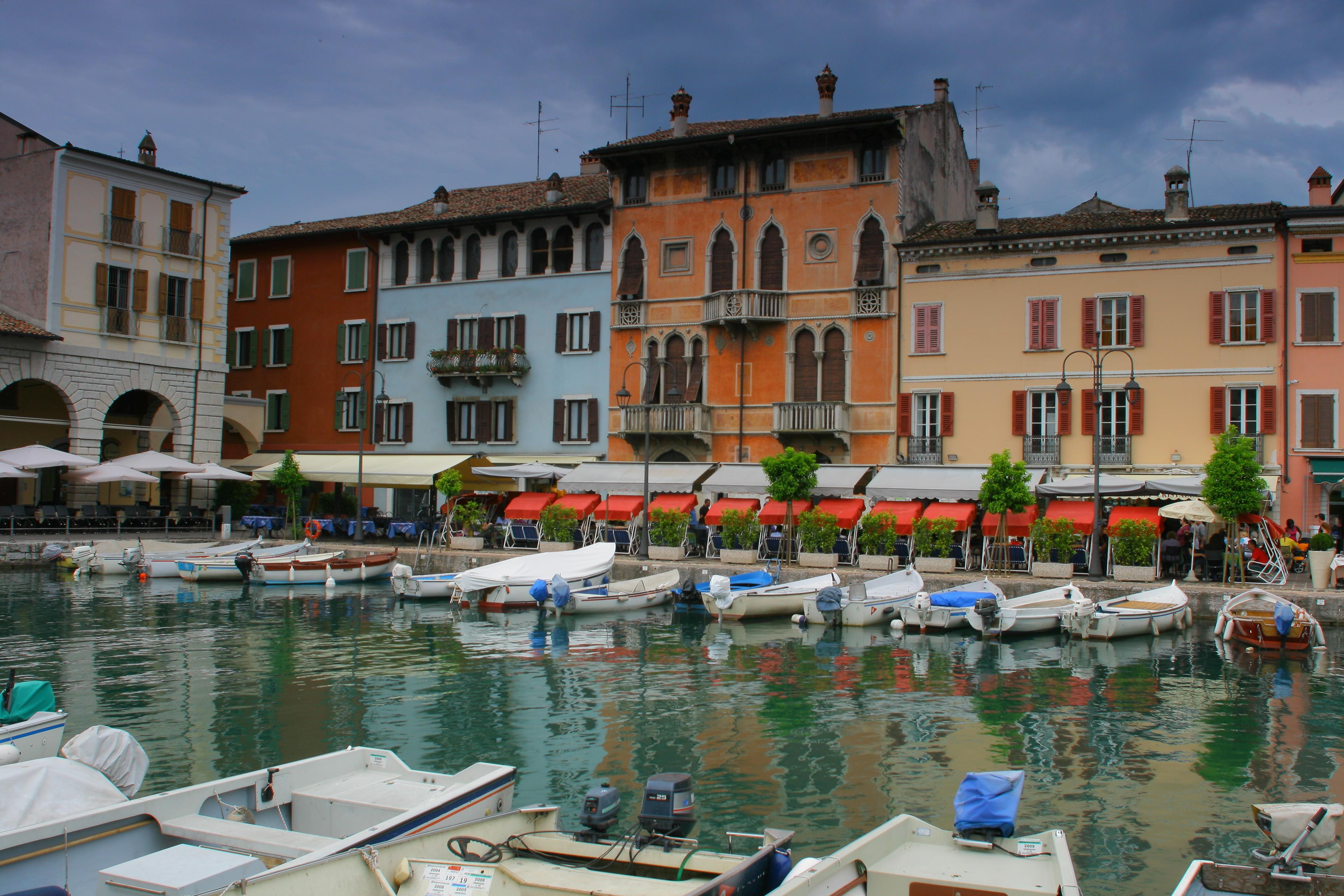
Desenzano harbor

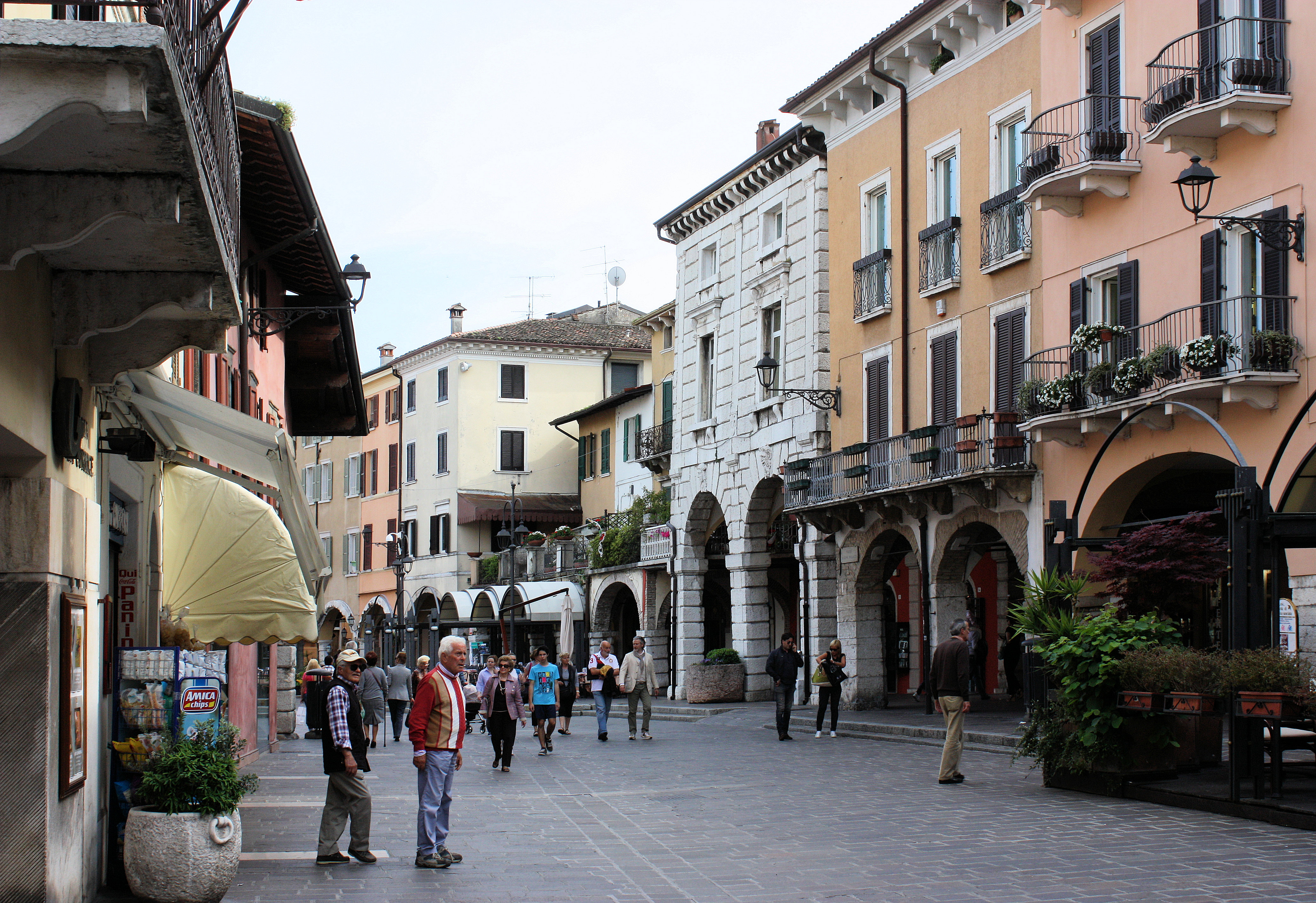
Street in the old city centre

== See also ==
- Rocca di Manerba del Garda
