= 2018 Italian Athletics Championships =

- Dates: 7–9 September
- Host city: Pescara
- Level: Senior
- Events: 42

The 2018 Italian Athletics Championships was the 108th edition of the Italian Athletics Championships and took place in Pescara from 7 to 9 September.

== Champions ==
Track events
Event	Men	Performance	Women	Performance
100 m	Marcell Jacobs	10.24	Johanelis Herrera Abreu	11.59
200 m	Davide Re	21.04	Irene Siragusa	23.25
400 m	Davide Re	45.92	Raphaela Lukudo	52.38 PB
800 m	Enrico Brazzale	1:46.93	Irene Baldessari	2:02.47
1500 m	Joao Bussotti	3:46.41	Giulia Aprile	4:15.80 PB
5000 m	Marouan Razine	14:04.31	Nadia Battocletti	16:15.30 PB
110/100 m hs	Lorenzo Perini	13.57	Luminosa Bogliolo	13.21
400 m hs	José Bencosme	49.52 SB	Yadisleidy Pedroso	55.62
3000 m st	Leonardo Feletto	8:34.17 PB	Isabel Mattuzzi	9:51.89
4x100 m relay	Atletica Riccardi Milano 1946; Ferraro, Cattaneo, Martini, Polanco Rijo	40.39	Centro Sportivo Carabinieri; Spacca, Hooper, Bongiorni, Latini	
4x400 m relay	G.S. Fiamme Gialle (Aceti, Tricca, Valentini, Re)	3:06.48	C.S. Esercito (Chigbolu, Milani, Bazzoni, Lukudo)	3:37.16
Road events
10 km walk (road)	Massimo Stano	38.19 PB	Antonella Palmisano	45:15
Field events
Long jump	Filippo Randazzo	7.76 m	Laura Strati	6.41 m
Triple jump	Fabrizio Schembri	16.60 m SB	Ottavia Cestonaro	13.41 m
High jump	Gianmarco Tamberi	2.30 m	Elena Vallortigara	1.91 m
Pole vault	Claudio Stecchi	5.50 m	Roberta Bruni	4.35 m
Shot put	Sebastiano Bianchetti	19.39 m	Chiara Rosa	17.08 m SB
Discus throw	Giovanni Faloci	61.53 m	Valentina Aniballi	56.80 m
Hammer throw	Marco Lingua	73.95 m	Sara Fantini	63.72 m
Javelin throw	Mauro Fraresso	76.16 m	Sara Jemai	58.19 m PB
Combined
Decathlon/Heptathlon	Luca Di Tizio	7240 pts	Sveva Gerevini	5322 pts

== See also ==
- 2018 Italian Athletics Indoor Championships
