= Antonio Infantino (sprinter) =

Italian sprinter

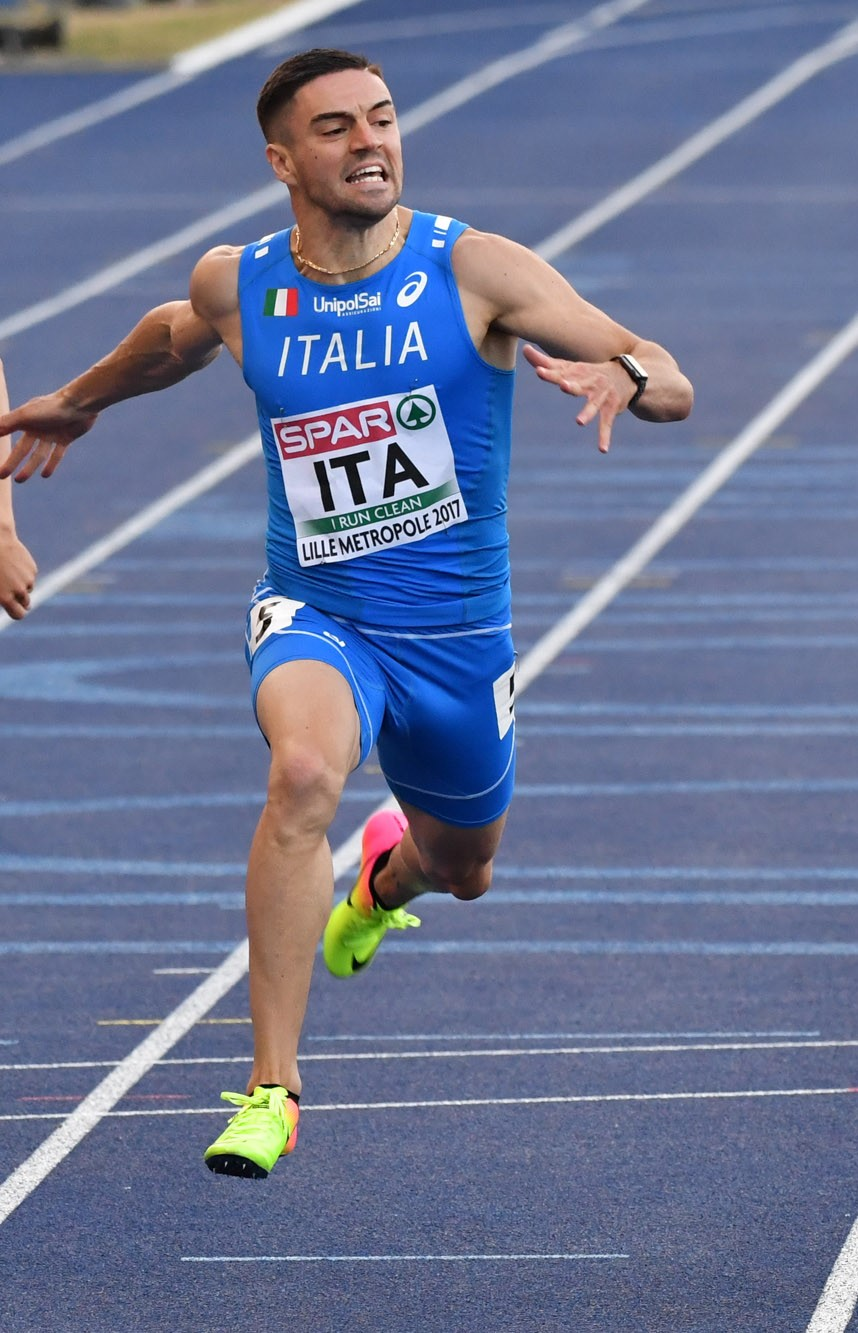
- Infantino in 2017

Personal information
- Full name: Antonio Baldassare Infantino
- National team: Italy: 5 caps (2016-2021)
- Born: 22 March 1991 (age 35) Welwyn Garden City, England
- Height: 1.76 m (5 ft 9 in)
- Weight: 73 kg (161 lb)

Sport
- Country: Italy
- Sport: Track
- Event: Sprint
- Club: Athletic Club 96 Alperia
- Coached by: Thomas Sparks

Achievements and titles
- Personal bests: 100 m: 10.26 (2019); 200 m: 20.41 (2019)

Antonio Baldassare Infantino (born 23 March 1991) is a British-Italian sprinter who has won two national titles at the senior level. He competed at the 2020 Summer Olympics, in 200 m.

== Career ==
Born in England to Italian parents, Infantino trains at the Lee Valley Athletics Center in London, where he grew up. For competition purposes, he transferred his country of allegiance from Great Britain to Italy in June 2016. Infantino participated in one edition of the European Athletics Championships in 2016, one of the World Athletics Championships in Doha 2019 and one World Athletics Relays Championships in 2021. In 2021 he made his first Olympic Games, qualifying for both the 200m and 4 × 100 m relay.

== Doping violation ==
In April 2022 Infantino was issued with a three-year ban backdated to December 2021 for an anti-doping violation in relation to presence and use of a banned substance. The nature of the substance or details of the judgement were not publicly disclosed by the Italian Anti-Doping Organization. His results from June 2021 onwards were disqualified.

== National titles ==
- Italian Athletics Championships
  - 200 metres: 2019, 2020

== See also ==
- Italian all-time lists - 200 metres
- List of eligibility transfers in athletics
- Naturalized athletes of Italy
