= Cuba at the 2025 World Athletics Championships =

- Flag of Cuba
- WA code: CUB

in Tokyo, Japan 13 September 2025 – 21 September 2025
- Competitors: 17 (7 men and 10 women)
- Medals Ranked 16th: Gold 1 Silver 0 Bronze 2 Total 3

World Athletics Championships appearances
- 1983; 1987; 1991; 1993; 1995; 1997; 1999; 2001; 2003; 2005; 2007; 2009; 2011; 2013; 2015; 2017; 2019; 2022; 2023; 2025

Cuba competed at the 2025 World Athletics Championships in Tokyo, Japan, from 13 to 21 September 2025.

== Medalists ==
Medal	Athlete	Event	Date
Gold	Leyanis Pérez	Women's triple jump	September 18
Bronze	Silinda Morales	Women's discus throw	September 14
Bronze	Lázaro Martínez	Men's triple jump	September 19

== Results ==
Cuba entered 17 athletes to the championships: 10 women and 7 men.

Key

- Q = Qualified for the next round
- q = Qualified for the next round as a fastest loser or, in field events, by position without achieving the qualifying target
- NR = National record
- PB = Personal best
- SB = Season best
- N/A = Round not applicable for the event

=== Men ===
Field events

Athlete	Event	Qualification		Final	
Athlete	Event	Distance	Position	Distance	Position
Jorge A. Hodelín	Long jump	7.50	34	Did not advance	
Andy Hechevarría	Triple jump	16.48	22	Did not advance	
Lázaro Martínez	Triple jump	16.93	8 q	17.49 SB	3rd place, bronze medalist(s)
Cristian Nápoles	Triple jump	16.21	27	Did not advance	
Juan Carley Vázquez	Shot put	19.21	27	Did not advance	
Mario Alberto Díaz	Discus throw	65.66	7 q	64.71	5
Ronald Mencía	Hammer throw	74.14	19	Did not advance	

=== Women ===
Track and road events

Athlete	Event	Heat		Semifinal		Final	
Athlete	Event	Result	Rank	Result	Rank	Result	Rank
Roxana Gómez	400 metres	50.35 SB	3 Q	49.78 SB	2 Q	49.48 NR	6
Daily Cooper Gaspar	800 metres	1:58.16	2 Q	2:03.00	8	Did not advance	
Anisleidis Ochoa	5000 metres	15:31.35 NR	19	—N/a		Did not advance	
Greisys Roble	100 metres hurdles	12.84	3 Q	12.97	6	Did not advance	

Field events

Athlete	Event	Qualification		Final	
Athlete	Event	Distance	Position	Distance	Position
Dacsy Adelina Brisón	High jump	1.88	17	Did not advance	
Leyanis Pérez Hernández	Triple jump	14.66	1 Q	14.94 WL	1st place, gold medalist(s)
Liadagmis Povea	Triple jump	14.44	3 Q	14.72	4
Dianelis Delís	Shot put	17.39	23	Did not advance	
Melany del Pilar Matheus	Discus throw	54.98	35	Did not advance	
Silinda Moráles	Discus throw	63.22	11 q	67.25 PB	3rd place, bronze medalist(s)
