= 2015 World Youth Championships in Athletics – Boys' triple jump =

Boys' triple jump at the 2015 World Youth Championships in Athletics
- Venue: Estadio Olímpico Pascual Guerrero
- Dates: 15 and 17 July
- Competitors: 23 from 19 nations
- Winning distance: 16.13

Medalists
| gold medal | Cristian Nápoles | Cuba |
| silver medal | Du Mingze | China |
| bronze medal | Julio Carbonell | Cuba |

The boys' triple jump at the 2015 World Youth Championships in Athletics was held at the Estadio Olímpico Pascual Guerrero in Cali, Colombia on 15 and 17 July 2015.

== Records ==
Prior to the competition, the following records were as follows.

| World Youth Best | Lázaro Martínez (CUB) | 17.24 | Havana, Cuba | 1 February 2014 |
| Championship Record | Héctor Dairo Fuentes (CUB) | 16.63 | Marrakesh, Morocco | 16 July 2005 |
| Championship Record | Lázaro Martínez (CUB) | 16.63 | Donetsk, Ukraine | 13 July 2013 |
| World Youth Leading | Cristian Nápoles (CUB) | 16.45 | Havana, Cuba | 15 May 2015 |

== Results ==
=== Qualification ===
With qualifying standard of 15.25 (Q) or at least the 12 best performers (q) advance to the final.

| Rank | Group | Name | Nationality | 1 | 2 | 3 | Mark | Notes |
|---|---|---|---|---|---|---|---|---|
| 1 | B | Cristian Nápoles | Cuba | 15.98 | | | 15.98 | Q |
| 2 | B | Du Mingze | China | 15.82 | | | 15.82 | Q, PB |
| 3 | A | Julio Carbonell | Cuba | 15.52 | | | 15.52 | Q |
| 4 | A | Martin Lamou | France | 15.39 | | | 15.39 | Q |
| 4 | B | Melvin Raffin | France | 15.39 | | | 15.39 | Q |
| 6 | A | Mert Çiçek | Turkey | 15.35 | | | 15.35 | Q |
| 7 | A | Shi Yuhao | China | 14.39 | 15.31 | | 15.31 | Q, PB |
| 8 | A | Chamal Waduge | Sri Lanka | 14.76 | 14.90 | 15.29 | 15.29 | Q |
| 9 | B | Kristóf Pap | Hungary | 15.17 | 14.96 | x | 15.17 | q, PB |
| 10 | B | Nam Su-hwan | South Korea | 15.04 | 15.11 | 15.07 | 15.11 | q |
| 11 | B | Ivan Nyemeck | Canada | 14.35 | 15.03 | 15.08 | 15.08 | q, PB |
| 12 | B | Tony Solis | Dominican Republic | x | 14.64 | 15.00 | 15.00 | q |
| 13 | B | Edinson Luna | Venezuela | x | 14.48 | 14.95 | 14.95 | SB |
| 14 | A | Johnny Montenegro | Colombia | 13.31 | 14.91 | 14.72 | 14.91 | PB |
| 15 | B | Murillo Santos | Brazil | 14.77 | 14.87 | 14.86 | 14.87 | |
| 16 | B | Shinya Kobayashi | Japan | 14.81 | 14.85 | 14.66 | 14.85 | |
| 17 | A | Dimitrios Monopolis | Greece | 14.51 | 14.46 | 14.75 | 14.75 | |
| 18 | A | Gabriel Dos Santos | Brazil | x | x | 14.74 | 14.74 | |
| 19 | B | Fabio Camattari | Italy | 14.54 | 14.24 | x | 14.54 | |
| 20 | A | Andre Anura | Malaysia | 13.66 | x | 14.54 | 14.54 | |
| 21 | A | Fredy Lemus | Guatemala | x | 14.47 | 14.46 | 14.47 | |
| – | A | Răzvan Grecu | Romania | x | x | x | NM | |
| – | A | Sonu Kumar | India | x | r | | NM | |

=== Final ===
| Rank | Name | Nationality | 1 | 2 | 3 | 4 | 5 | 6 | Mark | Notes |
|---|---|---|---|---|---|---|---|---|---|---|
| 1st place, gold medalist(s) | Cristian Nápoles | Cuba | 16.13 | x | x | x | 15.97 | x | 16.13 | |
| 2nd place, silver medalist(s) | Du Mingze | China | 16.00 | 15.92 | 15.90 | 15.69 | 15.32 | 16.02 | 16.02 | PB |
| 3rd place, bronze medalist(s) | Julio Carbonell | Cuba | 15.63 | 13.53 | 15.10 | 15.70 | 13.79 | x | 15.70 | |
| 4 | Mert Çiçek | Turkey | 15.33 | 15.46 | x | x | x | 15.68 | 15.68 | PB |
| 5 | Chamal Waduge | Sri Lanka | 15.28 | x | 15.40 | 15.16 | 15.44 | 15.53 | 15.53 | PB |
| 6 | Shi Yuhao | China | 15.01 | 15.41 | 14.90 | 15.26 | 15.04 | 15.34 | 15.41 | PB |
| 7 | Nam Su-hwan | South Korea | x | x | 15.36 | x | 14.93 | x | 15.36 | |
| 8 | Tony Solis | Dominican Republic | 15.30 | x | 14.95 | 15.22 | x | 13.99 | 15.30 | |
| 9 | Kristóf Pap | Hungary | x | x | 15.08 | | | | 15.08 | |
| 10 | Ivan Nyemeck | Canada | 14.73 | x | 14.89 | | | | 14.89 | |
| 11 | Melvin Raffin | France | x | x | 14.61 | | | | 14.61 | |
| 12 | Martin Lamou | France | 13.32 | 14.34 | x | | | | 14.34 | |
