= 2009 World Championships in Athletics – Men's 200 metres =

Men's 200 metres at the 2009 World Championships
- Venue: Olympiastadion (Berlin)
- Dates: 18 August (heats and quarter-finals); 19 August (semi-finals); 20 August (final)
- Competitors: 59
- Winning time: 19.19 WR

Medalists
gold medal	Usain Bolt	Jamaica
silver medal	Alonso Edward	Panama
bronze medal	Wallace Spearmon	United States

Official Video

The men's 200 metres at the 2009 World Championships in Athletics was held at the Olympic Stadium, Berlin, Germany on August 18 and August 20. The winning margin was 0.62 seconds which as of 2024 is the only time the men's 200 metres has been won by more than half a second at these championships.

The race favourites were Tyson Gay and Usain Bolt. Gay entered the competition as the reigning world champion, championship record holder, and 200 m world leader with 19.58 seconds. Bolt, the current Olympic champion and world record holder, had a season's best of 19.59 seconds. The last time the two athletes raced was at the 2007 World Championships in Osaka, where Gay beat Bolt by a margin of 0.15 seconds. Osaka bronze medallist Wallace Spearmon was the only other athlete to run under twenty seconds that season and former Olympic champion Shawn Crawford was also competing. Up-and-coming athletes Alonso Edward, Steve Mullings and Ramil Guliyev were among the season's fastest sprinters prior to the championships.

After hurting his groin during his American record run in the 100 metres two days earlier, Gay withdrew from the race, effectively rescinding his second world title. The withdrawal of Dwain Chambers, Churandy Martina and Jaysuma Saidy Ndure also reduced the quality of the field. There were no surprise eliminations in the heats, where Crawford, Mullings, Robert Hering, and Martial Mbandjock were the fastest qualifiers, and Mullings had the fastest time of the quarter-finals round, with all the favourite athletes progressing. On the second day of competition, German number one Hering was eliminated. Bolt and Spearmon were the two semi-final winners, while the third-fastest, 19-year-old Alonso Edward, demonstrated medal winning form.

In the final race, Usain Bolt, the clear favourite, had another world record-breaking run following his 9.58 second record in the 100 metres four days earlier. After having the fastest reaction time of the race, Bolt came out of the bend in first place and extended his lead further in the home straight, beating his previous mark of 19.30 seconds set at the Olympics by 0.11 seconds to take the gold medal and Championship record. Crawford, second fastest at the bend, was overtaken by Edward and Spearmon and eventually finished fourth. Edward vastly improved his previous best to set a South American record of 19.81, while Spearmon was third with 19.85 seconds. At 19 years, 255 days old, silver medallist Edward became the youngest ever world medallist for the men's 200 m.

Although the race between Gay and Bolt had not materialised, Bolt's world record of 19.19 seconds was a highlight of the championships. The overall quality of the event was also high: Edward had improved from 20.62 to 19.81 seconds over the course of one year. Also, with Crawford running 19.89 seconds, it was the first ever 200 m race to see four athletes run under 19.9 seconds. Bolt's winning margin of 0.62 seconds over second-placed Edward was the biggest in World Championship history. He received a $100,000 bonus for his performance, which was 0.13 seconds faster than Michael Johnson's former world record, a mark that had been regarded as one of the best records in the history of athletics.

== Medalists ==
Gold	Silver	Bronze
Usain Bolt; Jamaica	Alonso Edward; Panama	Wallace Spearmon; United States

== Records ==
Prior to the competition, the following records were as follows.

World record	Usain Bolt (JAM)	19.30	Beijing, China	20 August 2008
Championship record	Tyson Gay (USA)	19.76	Osaka, Japan	30 August 2007
World leading	Tyson Gay (USA)	19.58	New York, United States	30 May 2009
African record	Frankie Fredericks (NAM)	19.68	Atlanta, United States	1 August 1996
Asian Record	Shingo Suetsugu (JPN)	20.03	Yokohama, Japan	7 June 2003
North American record	Usain Bolt (JAM)	19.30	Beijing, China	20 August 2008
South American record	Claudinei da Silva (BRA)	19.89	Munich, Germany	11 September 1999
European record	Pietro Mennea (ITA)	19.72	Mexico, Mexico	12 September 1979
Oceanian record	Peter Norman (AUS)	20.06	Mexico, Mexico	16 October 1968

== Qualification standards ==
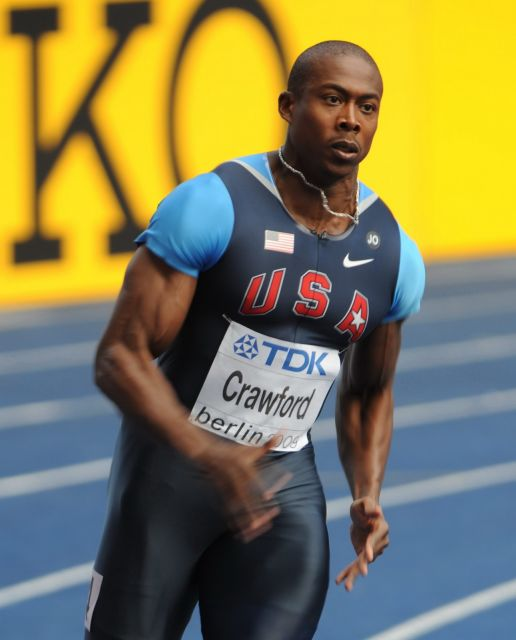
Shawn Crawford finished in fourth place

A time	B time
20.59	20.75

== Schedule ==
Date	Time	Round
August 18, 2009	10:05	Heats
August 18, 2009	18:55	Quarterfinals
August 19, 2009	19:25	Semifinals
August 20, 2009	20:35	Final

== Results ==
KEY:	q	Fastest non-qualifiers	Q	Qualified	WR	World record	AR	Area record	NR	National record	PB	Personal best	SB	Seasonal best

=== Heats ===
Qualification: First 3 in each heat(Q) and the next 5 fastest(q) advance to the quarterfinals.

Rank	Heat	Name	Nationality	Time	Notes
1	1	Shawn Crawford	United States	20.60	Q
2	3	Steve Mullings	Jamaica	20.62	Q
3	9	Robert Hering	Germany	20.64	Q
4	7	Martial Mbandjock	France	20.65	Q
5	3	Paul Hession	Ireland	20.66	Q
5	9	Wallace Spearmon	United States	20.66	Q
7	3	Kenji Fujimitsu	Japan	20.69	Q
8	5	Usain Bolt	Jamaica	20.70	Q
9	6	Alonso Edward	Panama	20.71	Q
9	9	Gavin Smellie	Canada	20.71	Q
11	3	David Alerte	France	20.72	q
12	5	Rondel Sorrillo	Trinidad and Tobago	20.74	Q
13	6	Marc Schneeberger	Switzerland	20.76	Q
14	7	Marco Cribari	Switzerland	20.80	Q
14	5	Sam Effah	Canada	20.80	Q
16	2	Brendan Christian	Antigua and Barbuda	20.81	Q
16	6	Emmanuel Callander	Trinidad and Tobago	20.81	Q
18	8	Jared Connaughton	Canada	20.82	Q
19	7	Rolando Palacios	Honduras	20.83	Q
19	7	Kim Collins	Saint Kitts and Nevis	20.83	q
21	2	Aleixo-Platini Menga	Germany	20.84	Q
22	1	Roman Smirnov	Russia	20.85	Q
23	8	Shinji Takahira	Japan	20.86	Q
24	2	Charles Clark	United States	20.87	Q
25	9	Thuso Mpuang	South Africa	20.91	q
26	4	Marlon Devonish	Great Britain & N.I.	20.92	Q
27	2	Ben Youssef Meité	Ivory Coast	20.93	q
28	2	Omar Jouma Bilal Al-Salfa	United Arab Emirates	20.94	q
29	1	Brian Dzingai	Zimbabwe	20.97	Q
29	9	Ramone McKenzie	Jamaica	20.97	
31	7	Alexander Kosenkow	Germany	20.99	
32	8	Stéphan Buckland	Mauritius	21.00	Q
32	6	Ihor Bodrov	Ukraine	21.00	
32	6	Hamed Hamadan Al-Bishi	Saudi Arabia	21.00	
35	9	Seth Amoo	Ghana	21.04	
36	8	Patrick van Luijk	Netherlands	21.05	
37	4	Ramil Guliyev	Azerbaijan	21.12	Q
38	5	Sandro Viana	Brazil	21.18	
39	4	Marek Niit	Estonia	21.21	Q
40	5	Eddy De Lépine	France	21.23	
41	3	Khalid Idrissi Zougari	Morocco	21.24	
42	4	Nathaniel McKinney	Bahamas	21.26	
43	1	Adam Harris	Guyana	21.28	
44	6	Ramon Gittens	Barbados	21.33	
45	4	Joel Redhead	Grenada	21.37	
45	7	Ángel David Rodríguez	Spain	21.37	
47	1	Aaron Armstrong	Trinidad and Tobago	21.38	SB
47	4	Ronalds Arājs	Latvia	21.38	
47	5	Hitoshi Saito	Japan	21.38	
50	2	Niko Verekauta	Fiji	21.43	SB
51	2	Amr Ibrahim Mostafa Seoud	Egypt	21.44	
52	6	Vyacheslav Muravyev	Kazakhstan	21.48	
53	8	Fanuel Kenosi	Botswana	21.75	SB
54	3	Franklin Nazareno	Ecuador	21.84	
55	4	Sibusiso Matsenjwa	Swaziland	21.93	PB
56	1	Khalil Al Hanahneh	Jordan	21.98	
57	8	Nikolai Portelli	Malta	22.11	
58	4	Andrew Hinds	Barbados	22.60	
59	8	Gabriel Mvumvure	Zimbabwe	22.67	
	2	Desislav Gunev	Bulgaria	DNF	
	8	Arnaldo Abrantes	Portugal	DNS	
	1	Dwain Chambers	Great Britain & N.I.	DNS	
	7	Tyson Gay	United States	DNS	
	9	Churandy Martina	Netherlands Antilles	DNS	
	5	Obinna Metu	Nigeria	DNS	
	3	Gerald Phiri	Zambia	DNS	
	1	Jaysuma Saidy Ndure	Norway	DNS	

=== Quarterfinals ===
Qualification: First 3 in each heat(Q) and the next 4 fastest(q) advance to the semifinals.

Rank	Heat	Name	Nationality	Time	Notes
1	3	Steve Mullings	Jamaica	20.23	Q
2	4	Alonso Edward	Panama	20.33	Q
3	2	Shawn Crawford	United States	20.37	Q
4	3	Ramil Guliyev	Azerbaijan	20.40	Q
5	1	Usain Bolt	Jamaica	20.41	Q
6	4	Wallace Spearmon	United States	20.44	Q
7	3	Paul Hession	Ireland	20.48	Q
8	1	David Alerte	France	20.51	Q, SB
9	1	Martial Mbandjock	France	20.55	Q, PB
9	1	Charles Clark	United States	20.55	q
11	4	Robert Hering	Germany	20.58	Q
11	3	Brendan Christian	Antigua and Barbuda	20.58	q
11	1	Rondel Sorrillo	Trinidad and Tobago	20.58	q
14	3	Emmanuel Callander	Trinidad and Tobago	20.62	q
15	2	Marlon Devonish	Great Britain & N.I.	20.66	Q
16	3	Aleixo-Platini Menga	Germany	20.68	
17	2	Rolando Palacios	Honduras	20.69	Q, SB
17	2	Shinji Takahira	Japan	20.69	
19	2	Roman Smirnov	Russia	20.72	SB
20	3	Ben Youssef Meité	Ivory Coast	20.78	
21	4	Marco Cribari	Switzerland	20.81	
22	1	Kim Collins	Saint Kitts and Nevis	20.84	
23	4	Thuso Mpuang	South Africa	20.87	
24	1	Marc Schneeberger	Switzerland	20.91	
25	2	Omar Jouma Bilal Al-Salfa	United Arab Emirates	20.97	
25	4	Kenji Fujimitsu	Japan	20.97	
25	4	Sam Effah	Canada	20.97	
28	1	Gavin Smellie	Canada	21.27	
29	3	Stéphan Buckland	Mauritius	21.33	
	2	Jared Connaughton	Canada	DSQ	
	2	Brian Dzingai	Zimbabwe	DNF	
	4	Marek Niit	Estonia	DNS	

=== Semifinals ===
First 4 of each Semifinal will be directly qualified (Q) for the Finals.

==== Semifinal 1 ====
Rank	Lane	Name	Nationality	React	Time	Notes
1	3	Usain Bolt	Jamaica	0.177	20.08	Q
2	5	Alonso Edward	Panama	0.164	20.22	Q
3	6	Shawn Crawford	United States	0.140	20.35	Q
4	4	David Alerte	France	0.147	20.45	Q, SB
5	7	Robert Hering	Germany	0.157	20.52	
6	2	Rondel Sorrillo	Trinidad and Tobago	0.128	20.63	
7	8	Rolando Palacios	Honduras	0.191	20.67	SB
8	1	Brendan Christian	Antigua and Barbuda	0.138	20.79	

==== Semifinal 2 ====
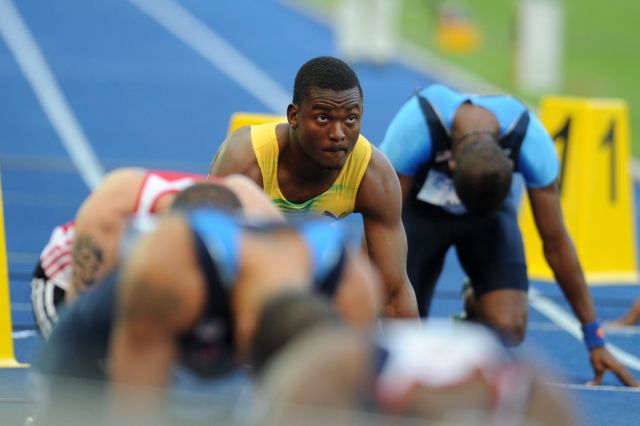
Steve Mullings prepares for the second semi-final

Rank	Lane	Name	Nationality	React	Time	Notes
1	5	Wallace Spearmon	United States	0.164	20.14	Q
2	3	Steve Mullings	Jamaica	0.156	20.26	Q
3	2	Charles Clark	United States	0.163	20.27	Q, SB
4	4	Ramil Guliyev	Azerbaijan	0.154	20.28	Q
5	7	Martial Mbandjock	France	0.155	20.43	PB
6	8	Paul Hession	Ireland	0.166	20.48	
7	6	Marlon Devonish	Great Britain & N.I.	0.154	20.62	
8	1	Emmanuel Callander	Trinidad and Tobago	0.145	20.70	

=== Final ===
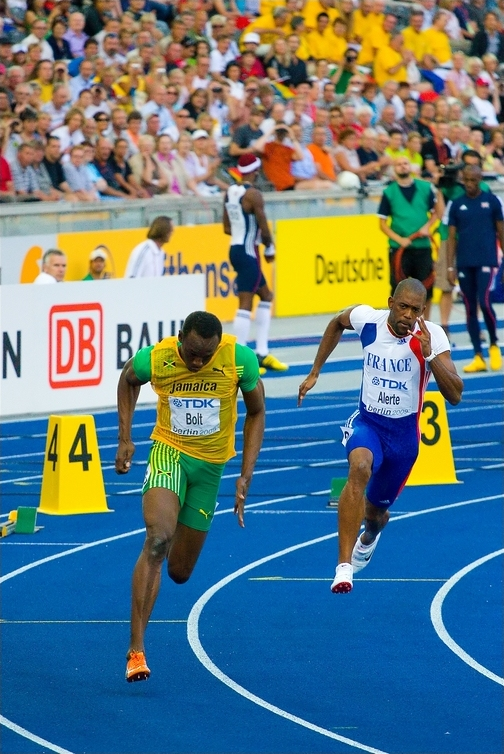
Usain Bolt led the race from start to finish

Rank	Lane	Name	Nationality	React	Time	Notes
1st place, gold medalist(s)	5	Usain Bolt	Jamaica	0.133	19.19	WR
2nd place, silver medalist(s)	6	Alonso Edward	Panama	0.179	19.81	AR
3rd place, bronze medalist(s)	4	Wallace Spearmon	United States	0.152	19.85	SB
4	8	Shawn Crawford	United States	0.148	19.89	SB
5	3	Steve Mullings	Jamaica	0.146	19.98	PB
6	7	Charles Clark	United States	0.158	20.39	
7	1	Ramil Guliyev	Azerbaijan	0.165	20.61	
8	2	David Alerte	France	0.161	20.68	
