= Cuba at the 2019 World Athletics Championships =

Cuba at the 2019 World Championships in Athletics
- WA code: CUB

in Doha, Qatar
- Competitors: 17 (8 men and 9 women) in 14 events
- Medals Ranked 12th: Gold 1 Silver 1 Bronze 1 Total 3

World Championships in Athletics appearances
- 1983; 1987; 1991; 1993; 1995; 1997; 1999; 2001; 2003; 2005; 2007; 2009; 2011; 2013; 2015; 2017; 2019; 2022; 2023

Cuba competed at the 2019 World Championships in Athletics in Doha, Qatar from 27 September to 6 October 2019. The country finished in 12th place in the medal table.

== Medalists ==
Medal	Athlete	Event	Date
Gold	Yaime Pérez	Women's discus throw	October 4
Silver	Denia Caballero	Women's discus throw	October 4
Bronze	Juan Miguel Echevarría	Men's long jump	September 28

== Results ==
(q – qualified, NM – no mark, SB – season best)

=== Men ===
Track and road events

Athlete	Event	Heat		Semifinal		Final	
Athlete	Event	Result	Rank	Result	Rank	Result	Rank
Reynier Mena	200 m	20.52	27 Q	20.61	20	did not advance	
Roger Iribarne	110 m hurdles	14.37	34	did not advance			

Field events

Athlete	Event	Qualification		Final	
Athlete	Event	Result	Rank	Result	Rank
Luis Zayas	High jump	2.29	4 q	2.30 PB	5
Juan Miguel Echevarría	Long jump	8.40	1 Q	8.34	3rd place, bronze medalist(s)
Jordan Díaz	Triple jump	16.93	7 q	17.06	8
Cristian Nápoles	Triple jump	16.88	11 q	17.38 PB	5
Andy Díaz	Triple jump	16.41	24	did not advance	
Jorge Fernández	Discus throw	60.60	26	did not advance	

=== Women ===
Track and road events

Athlete	Event	Heat		Semifinal		Final	
Athlete	Event	Result	Rank	Result	Rank	Result	Rank
Roxana Gómez	400 m	51.85	21 q	51.56 SB	12	did not advance	
Rose Mary Almanza	800 m	2:03.42	28 Q	2:01.18	13	did not advance	
Zurian Hechavarría	400 m hurdles	55.36	13 Q	55.03	9	did not advance	
Zurian Hechavarría; Rose Mary Almanza; Adriana Rodríguez; Roxana Gómez	4 × 400 m relay	3:29.84 SB	13	—		did not advance	

Field events

Athlete	Event	Qualification		Final	
Athlete	Event	Result	Rank	Result	Rank
Yarisley Silva	Pole vault	4.60	8 Q	4.70	11
Adriana Rodríguez	Long jump	6.39	25	did not advance	
Liadagmis Povea	Triple jump	14.08	15	did not advance	
Yaime Pérez	Discus throw	67.78	1 Q	69.17	1st place, gold medalist(s)
Denia Caballero	Discus throw	65.86	2 Q	68.44	2nd place, silver medalist(s)
Melany Matheus	Discus throw	52.52	27	did not advance	
