= 2017 World Championships in Athletics – Men's triple jump =

Men's triple jump at the 2017 World Championships
- Venue: Olympic Stadium
- Dates: 7 August (qualification); 10 August (final)
- Competitors: 30 from 20 nations
- Winning distance: 17.68

Medalists
gold medal	Christian Taylor	United States
silver medal	Will Claye	United States
bronze medal	Nelson Évora	Portugal

Video on YouTube Official Video

The men's triple jump at the 2017 World Championships in Athletics was held at the Olympic Stadium on 7 and 10 August.

== Summary ==
In the first round of the final, Alexis Copello (Azerjaijan) was the first over 17 metres with a jump of 17.16 metres, and Will Claye (USA) took the lead with a 17.54 metre jump. In the second round, Nelson Évora (Portugal) moved into silver medal position, until Christian Taylor (USA) took the lead with a 17.57 metre jump. That lasted until Claye's next jump, 17.63 metres, which Taylor answered with a 17.68 m (58 ft 0 in) effort. None of the leaders were able to improve in the last three rounds. By the end of the competition, three jumpers had jumped 17.16 metres, their places settled by their second best jump, which in the case of Cristian Nápoles (CUB) was another 17.16 metres.

== Records ==
Before the competition records were as follows:

Record	Perf.	Athlete	Nat.	Date	Location
World	18.29	Jonathan Edwards	GBR	7 Aug 1995	Gothenburg, Sweden
Championship	18.29	Jonathan Edwards	GBR	7 Aug 1995	Gothenburg, Sweden
World leading	18.11	Christian Taylor	USA	27 May 2017	Eugene, OR, United States
African	17.37	Tarik Bouguetaïb	MAR	14 Jul 2007	Khemisset, Morocco
Asian	17.59	Li Yanxi	CHN	26 Oct 2009	Jinan, China
NACAC	18.21	Christian Taylor	USA	27 Aug 2015	Beijing, China
South American	17.90	Jadel Gregório	BRA	20 May 2007	Belém, Brazil
European	18.29	Jonathan Edwards	GBR	7 Aug 1995	Göteborg, Sweden
Oceanian	17.46	Ken Lorraway	AUS	7 Aug 1982	London, Great Britain

No records were set at the competition.

== Qualification standard ==
The standard to qualify automatically for entry was 16.80 metres.

== Schedule ==
The event schedule, in local time (UTC+1), is as follows:

Date	Time	Round
7 August	18:35	Qualification
10 August	20:20	Final

== Results ==
=== Qualification ===
The qualification round took place on 7 August, in two groups, both starting at 18:35. Athletes attaining a mark of at least 17.00 metres ( Q ) or at least the 12 best performers ( q ) qualified for the final. The overall results were as follows:

Rank	Group	Name	Nationality	Round			Mark	Notes
Rank	Group	Name	Nationality	1	2	3	Mark	Notes
1	A	Chris Benard	United States	17.20			17.20	Q
2	A	Christian Taylor	United States	17.15			17.15	Q
3	B	Cristian Nápoles	Cuba	17.06			17.06	Q
4	A	Andy Díaz	Cuba	16.96	16.86	x	16.96	q
5	B	Will Claye	United States	16.95	16.57	x	16.95	q
6	A	Nelson Évora	Portugal	16.64	16.94	x	16.94	q
7	A	Alexis Copello	Azerbaijan	16.89	16.88	16.53	16.89	q
8	A	Pablo Torrijos	Spain	16.57	16.00	16.80	16.80	q
9	B	Jean-Marc Pontvianne	France	16.66	16.17	16.78	16.78	q
10	B	Yordanys Durañona	Dominica	16.71	16.63	16.49	16.71	q
11	A	Wu Ruiting	China	x	16.40	16.66	16.66	q
12	B	Lázaro Martínez	Cuba	16.36	x	16.66	16.66	q
13	B	Donald Scott	United States	16.55	16.63	16.27	16.63	
14	B	Nazim Babayev	Azerbaijan	15.76	16.58	16.61	16.61	
15	A	Momchil Karailiev	Bulgaria	x	16.01	16.57	16.57	
16	B	Elvijs Misāns	Latvia	16.55	16.39	x	16.55	
17	A	Simo Lipsanen	Finland	16.54	16.48	16.41	16.54	
18	B	Georgi Tsonov	Bulgaria	16.53	16.32	x	16.53	
19	A	Nathan Fox	Great Britain & N.I.	16.27	16.49	16.02	16.49	
20	B	Alberto Álvarez	Mexico	15.60	16.41	16.48	16.48	
21	A	Benjamin Compaoré	France	16.46	16.35	x	16.46	
22	B	Troy Doris	Guyana	16.43	x	16.24	16.43	
23	A	Miguel van Assen	Suriname	16.38	x	x	16.38	
24	A	Melvin Raffin	France	16.18	14.25	x	16.18	
25	B	Tosin Oke	Nigeria	x	16.14	16.17	16.17	
26	B	Fang Yaoqing	China	x	16.17	x	16.17	
27	A	Mateus de Sá	Brazil	16.10	16.09	x	16.10	
28	B	Dimitrios Tsiamis	Greece	16.06	x	x	16.06	
29	A	Ryoma Yamamoto	Japan	x	x	16.01	16.01	
30	B	Clive Pullen	Jamaica	x	x	15.61	15.61	
	B	Max Heß	Germany				DNS	

=== Final ===
The final took place on 10 August at 20:20. The results were as follows:

Rank	Name	Nationality	Round						Mark	Notes
Rank	Name	Nationality	1	2	3	4	5	6	Mark	Notes
1st place, gold medalist(s)	Christian Taylor	United States	16.97	17.57	17.68	17.26	17.38	17.03	17.68	
2nd place, silver medalist(s)	Will Claye	United States	17.54	17.52	17.63	17.49	17.53	x	17.63	
3rd place, bronze medalist(s)	Nelson Évora	Portugal	17.02	17.19	16.58	x	x	16.01	17.19	
4	Cristian Nápoles	Cuba	x	x	17.16	x	x	17.16	17.16	
5	Alexis Copello	Azerbaijan	17.16	x	x	16.87	16.91	17.06	17.16	SB
6	Chris Benard	United States	16.88	x	16.94	x	x	17.16	17.16	
7	Andy Díaz	Cuba	17.13	x	x	x	–	x	17.13	
8	Jean-Marc Pontvianne	France	x	16.62	16.79	x	x	16.57	16.79	
9	Wu Ruiting	China	16.47	16.66	16.53				16.66	
10	Pablo Torrijos	Spain	16.60	16.51	16.53				16.60	
11	Yordanys Durañona	Dominica	16.42	x	x				16.42	
12	Lázaro Martínez	Cuba	x	16.25	16.09				16.25	
