= Cuba at the 2017 World Championships in Athletics =

- Flag of Cuba
- WA code: CUB
- National federation: Cuban Athletics Federation

in London, United Kingdom 4–13 August 2017
- Competitors: 27 (17 men and 10 women) in 17 events
- Medals Ranked =37th: Gold 0 Silver 0 Bronze 1 Total 1

World Championships in Athletics appearances
- 1983; 1987; 1991; 1993; 1995; 1997; 1999; 2001; 2003; 2005; 2007; 2009; 2011; 2013; 2015; 2017; 2019; 2022; 2023

Cuba competed at the 2017 World Championships in Athletics in London, Great Britain, from 4–13 August 2017.

== Medalists ==
Medal	Name	Event	Date
Bronze	Yarisley Silva	Women's pole vault	August 6

== Results ==
=== Men ===
Track and road events

Athlete	Event	Heat		Semifinal		Final	
Athlete	Event	Result	Rank	Result	Rank	Result	Rank
Yoandys Lescay	400 metres	45.93	31	Did not advance			
Roger Iribarne	110 metres hurdles	13.48	16 q	13.43	15	Did not advance	
Yordan O'Farrill	110 metres hurdles	13.56	22 q	DNF	–	Did not advance	
José Luis Gaspar	400 metres hurdles	51.82	33	Did not advance			
Harlyn Pérez; Roberto Skyers; Yaniel Carrero; José Luis Gaspar	4 × 100 metres relay	39.01 SB	13	—		Did not advance	
William Collazo; Adrian Chacón; Osmaidel Pellicier; Yoandys Lescay; Leandro Zamora*	4 × 400 metres relay	3:01.88 SB	8 Q	—		3:01.10 SB	6

* – Indicates the athlete competed in preliminaries but not the final

Field events

Athlete	Event	Qualification		Final	
Athlete	Event	Distance	Position	Distance	Position
Juan Miguel Echevarría	Long jump	7.86	15	Did not advance	
Maykel Massó	Long jump	8.15	2 Q	8.26	5
Andy Díaz	Triple jump	16.96	4 q	17.13	7
Lázaro Martínez	Triple jump	16.66	12 q	16.25	12
Cristian Nápoles	Triple jump	17.06	3 Q	17.16	4

Combined events – Decathlon

Athlete	Event	100 m	LJ	SP	HJ	400 m	110H	DT	PV	JT	1500 m	Final	Rank
Leonel Suárez	Result	15.93	DNS	DNS	–	–	–	–	–	–	–	DNF	–
Leonel Suárez	Points	94	0	0								DNF	–

=== Women ===
Track and road events

Athlete	Event	Heat		Semifinal		Final	
Athlete	Event	Result	Rank	Result	Rank	Result	Rank
Roxana Gómez	400 metres	51.98	20 q	52.01	17	Did not advance	
Rose Mary Almanza	800 metres	2:01.43	16 Q	1:59.79	8	Did not advance	
Dailín Belmonte	Marathon	—				2:46:15 SB	55
Zurian Hechavarría	400 metres hurdles	56.44	24	Did not advance			

Field events

Athlete	Event	Qualification		Final	
Athlete	Event	Distance	Position	Distance	Position
Yarisley Silva	Pole vault	4.55	6 q	4.65	3rd place, bronze medalist(s)
Liadagmis Povea	Triple jump	13.55	22	Did not advance	
Yaniuvis López	Shot put	17.84	11 q	18.03	8
Denia Caballero	Discus throw	63.79	5 Q	64.37	5
Yaime Pérez	Discus throw	65.58	2 Q	64.82	4

Combined events – Heptathlon

Athlete	Event	100H	HJ	SP	200 m	LJ	JT	800 m	Final	Rank
Yorgelis Rodríguez	Result	13.33	1.80	12.47	22.86	6.56	41.72	2:08.10	6594 NR	4
Yorgelis Rodríguez	Points	1036	1171	757	941	921	810	958	6594 NR	4
