= Donald Scott (triple jumper) =

American track and field athlete (b. 1992)

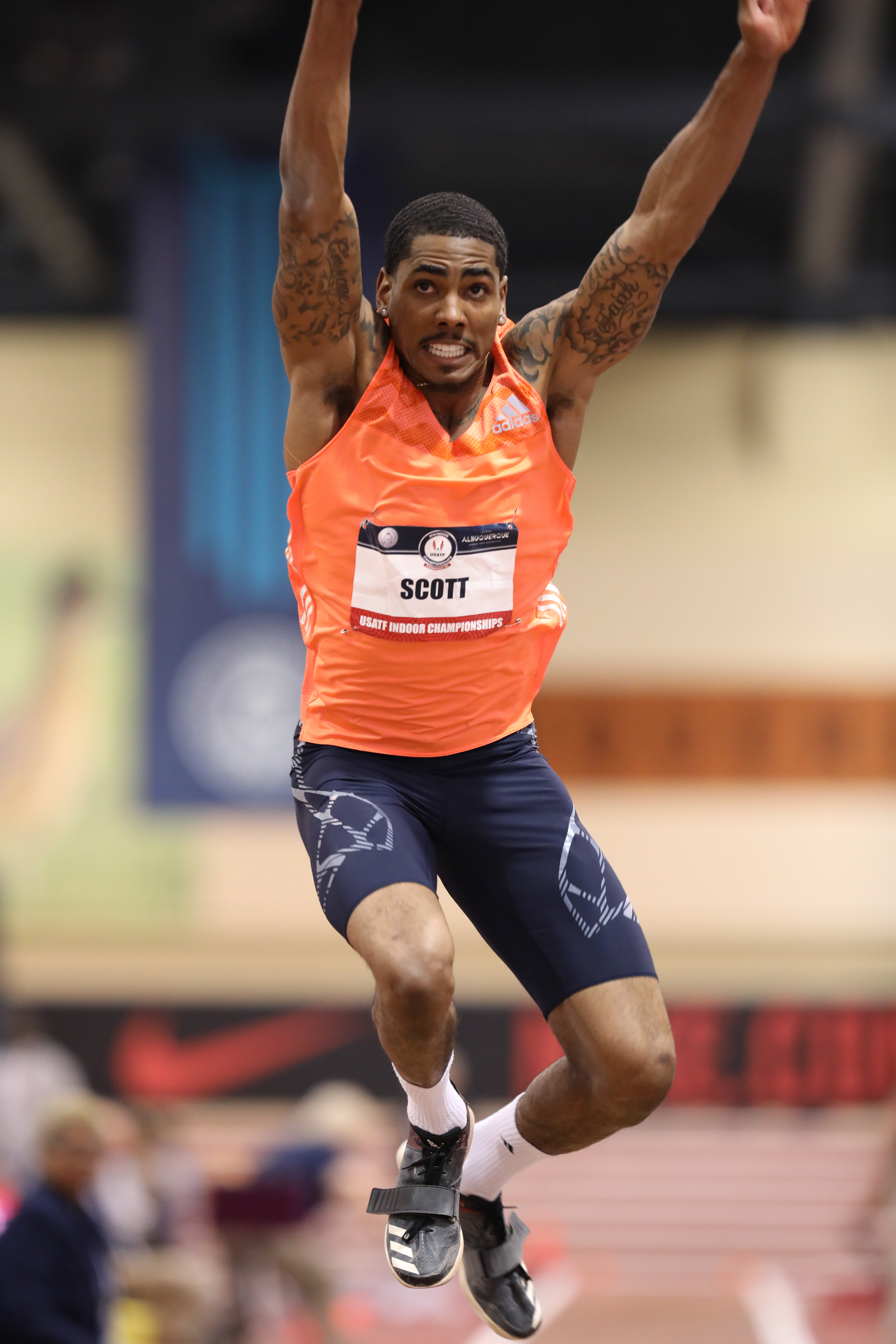
- Scott at the 2018 USA Indoor Track and Field Championships

Personal information
- Nationality: American
- Born: February 23, 1992 (age 34) Fort Lauderdale, Florida, U.S.
- Height: 6 ft 3 in (1.91 m)

Sport
- Sport: Track and field
- Event: Triple jump
- College team: Eastern Michigan University
- Turned pro: 2015

Achievements and titles
- Personal bests: Outdoor: Triple jump – 17.43 m (57 ft 2 in) (Wind: -0.5 m/s) (2019); Long jump – 7.58 m (24 ft 10 1/4 in) (Wind: +1.0 m/s) (2015); Indoor: Triple jump – 17.24 m (56 ft 6 1/2 in) (2020); Long jump – 7.57 m (24 ft 10 in) (2015); All information from IAAF
Medal record
Men's Athletics
Representing the United States
World Indoor Championships
Bronze medal – third place	2022 Belgrade	Triple jump

Donald Douglas Scott (born February 23, 1992) is an American track and field athlete who competes in the triple jump. Scott earned bronze medal in triple jump at 2022 World Indoor Championships. He holds a wind-aided personal best of 17.74 m (58 ft 2 1/4 in), set in 2019. He equalled that mark, to win the 2019 USA Outdoor Track and Field Championships. He is a 2017 and 2019 U.S. Indoor Triple Jump Champion and a 2018 U.S. Outdoor Champion. Scott is a third-year volunteer coach (since 2015) at Eastern Michigan University.

== Prep ==
Scott graduated from Apopka High School, Apopka, Florida, 15 miles northwest of Orlando, in 2010. He was an outstanding wide receiver and was introduced to field and track.

== Career ==
In his first season as a professional, Scott earned eighth place at the 2015 USATF Outdoor Championships and a fourth place at the USA Indoor Championships. In 2017, Scott took third at the Outdoor USA Championships, securing his spot on Team USA for the World Championships in London. In 2018, Scott placed second in triple jump at the 2018 Athletics World Cup and third at the 2018 IAAF Diamond League Final.

Year	Competition	Venue	Position	Event	Notes
Olympics, World Championships, Diamond League Final, Athletics World Cup
2022	2022 World Athletics Indoor Championships	Belgrade Serbia	3rd	Triple jump	17.21 m (56 ft 6 in)
2021	2021 Diamond League Final	Letzigrund, Zürich	6th	Triple jump	16.22 m (53 ft 3 in)
2021	Summer Olympics	Tokyo, Japan	7th	Triple jump	17.18 m (56 ft 4 in)
2019	World Championships	Doha, Qatar	6th	Triple jump	17.17 m (56 ft 4 in)
2019	The Match Europe v USA	London, England	5th	Triple jump	16.47 m (54 ft 0 in)
2019	2019 World Athletics Diamond League Final	Brussels, Belgium	4th	Triple jump	17.14 m (56 ft 3 in)
2018	2018 IAAF Diamond League Final	Brussels, Belgium	3rd	Triple jump	17.25 m (56 ft 7 in)
2018	2018 Athletics World Cup	London, England	2nd	Triple jump	16.73 m (54 ft 11 in)
2017	World Championships	London, England	13th	Triple jump	16.63 m (54 ft 7 in)
USATF Championships
Representing Adidas
2022	USA Indoor Track and Field Championships	Spokane, Washington	1st	Triple Jump	16.88 m (55 ft 5 in)
2021	United States Olympic Trials	Hayward Field	2nd	Triple jump	17.18 m (56 ft 4 in)
Unattached
2020	USA Indoor Track and Field Championships	Albuquerque, New Mexico	1st	Triple Jump	17.24 m (56 ft 7 in)
2019	USA Outdoor Track and Field Championships	Des Moines, Iowa	1st	Triple Jump	17.74 m (58 ft 2 in)
2019	USA Indoor Track and Field Championships	Ocean Breeze, New York	1st	Triple jump	16.85 m (55 ft 3 in)
2018	USA Outdoor Track and Field Championships	Des Moines, Iowa	1st	Triple jump	17.37 m (57 ft 0 in) (Wind: -0.0 m/s)
2018	USA Indoor Track and Field Championships	Albuquerque, New Mexico	5th	Triple jump	16.69 m (54 ft 9 in)
2017	2017 USA Outdoor Track and Field Championships	California State University, Sacramento	3rd	Triple jump	17.25 m (56 ft 7 in)
2017	USA Indoor Track and Field Championships	Albuquerque, New Mexico	1st	Triple jump	16.99 m (55 ft 9 in)
2016	2016 USA Outdoor Track and Field Championships	Hayward Field	7th	Triple jump	16.96 m (55 ft 8 in)
2016	USA Indoor Track and Field Championships	Portland, Oregon	4th	Triple jump	16.71 m (54 ft 10 in)
2015	2015 USA Outdoor Track and Field Championships	Hayward Field	8th	Triple jump	16.66 m (54 ft 8 in)

== NCAA Coaching ==
Coach Donald Scott worked with Eastern Michigan University until 2019 under the direction of John Goodridge.

== NCAA ==
Scott attended Eastern Michigan University (EMU), where he earned a degree in criminal justice. Scott set many records at EMU in track and field. While competing for the Eagles, Scott brought home nine Mid-American Conference (MAC) titles and two NCAA Division I All-American honors, and set the MAC and school record for the triple jump. He also came away his senior year with a 2014 NCAA Division I Outdoor Track and Field Championships, a third-place finish for the triple jump, and a runner-up finish indoors.

Year	Competition	Venue	Position	Event	Notes
NCAA Division I Track and Field Championships
2015	2015 NCAA Division I Outdoor Track and Field Championships	Hayward Field	3rd	Triple jump	16.83 m (55 ft 3 in)
2015	2015 NCAA Division I Indoor Track and Field Championships	University of Arkansas	2nd	Triple jump	16.84 m (55 ft 3 in)
2014	2014 NCAA Division I Outdoor Track and Field Championships	Hayward Field	6th	Triple jump	15.99 m (52 ft 6 in)
2012	2012 NCAA Division I Outdoor Track and Field Championships	Drake University	23rd	Triple jump	15.20 m (49 ft 10 in)
2011	2011 NCAA Division I Outdoor Track and Field Championships	Drake University	71st	Triple jump	14.74 m (48 ft 4 in)
