= Cuba at the 2015 World Championships in Athletics =

- WA code: CUB

in Beijing
- Competitors: 24
- Medals Ranked 10th: Gold 2 Silver 1 Bronze 0 Total 3

World Championships in Athletics appearances
- 1983; 1987; 1991; 1993; 1995; 1997; 1999; 2001; 2003; 2005; 2007; 2009; 2011; 2013; 2015; 2017; 2019; 2022; 2023; 2025

Cuba competed at the 2015 World Championships in Athletics in Beijing, China, from 22–30 August 2015.

== Medalists ==
Medal	Athlete	Event	Date
Gold	Denia Caballero	Women's discus throw	25 August
Gold	Yarisley Silva	Women's pole vault	26 August
Silver	Pedro Pablo Pichardo	Men's triple jump	27 August

== Results ==
(q – qualified, NM – no mark, SB – season best)

=== Men ===
Track and road events

Athlete	Event	Heat		Semifinal		Final	
Athlete	Event	Result	Rank	Result	Rank	Result	Rank
Reynier Mena	200 metres	20.37	3 Q	20.56	22	did not advance	
Roberto Skyers	200 metres	20.29	2 Q	20.23	12	did not advance	
Richer Pérez	Marathon	—N/a				DNF	
Yordan O'Farrill	110 metres hurdles	13.64	26	did not advance			
Jhoanis Portilla	110 metres hurdles	13.43	11 q	DNF		did not advance	
Raidel Acea; Adrián Chacón; William Collazo; Yoandys Lescay	4 × 400 metres relay	2:59.80 SB	8 q	—N/a		3:03.05	7

Field events

Athlete	Event	Qualification		Final	
Athlete	Event	Distance	Position	Distance	Position
Maykel Demetrio Massó	Long jump	7.70	23	did not advance	
Pedro Pablo Pichardo	Triple jump	17.43	1 Q	17.73	2nd place, silver medalist(s)
Roberto Janet	Hammer throw	75.28	10 q	72.50	12

Combined events – Decathlon

Athlete	Event	100 m	LJ	SP	HJ	400 m	110H	DT	PV	JT	1500 m	Final	Rank
Yordanis García	Result	10.77 SB	6.82	14.54	2.04 SB	48.67	DNF	DNS	–	–	–	DNF	
Yordanis García	Points	912	771	761	840	877	0	–	–	–	–	DNF	

=== Women ===
Track and road events

Athlete	Event	Heat		Semifinal		Final	
Athlete	Event	Result	Rank	Result	Rank	Result	Rank
Ariallis Gandulla	200 metres	23.35	40	did not advance			
Lisneidy Veitia	400 metres	52.25	32	did not advance			
Rose Mary Almanza	800 metres	2:01.33	23 Q	2:00.38	20	did not advance	
Dailín Belmonte	Marathon	—N/a				2:56:18 SB	51

Field events

Athlete	Event	Qualification		Final	
Athlete	Event	Distance	Position	Distance	Position
Yarisley Silva	Pole vault	4.55	9 q	4.90	1st place, gold medalist(s)
Yaniuvis López	Shot put	17.10	17	did not advance	
Denia Caballero	Discus throw	65.15	1 Q	69.28	1st place, gold medalist(s)
Yaime Pérez	Discus throw	62.93	5 q	65.46	4
Yirisleydi Ford	Hammer throw	69.43	15	did not advance	
Yulenmis Aguilar	Javelin throw	60.52	18	did not advance	

Combined events – Heptathlon

Athlete	Event	100H	HJ	SP	200 m	LJ	JT	800 m	Final	Rank
Yorgelis Rodríguez	Result	13.73 SB	1.86 PB	13.54	25.04	5.83	43.27	2:30.47	5932	21
Yorgelis Rodríguez	Points	1017	1054	763	883	798	730	687	5932	21

== Sources ==
- Cuban team
