= Christian Taylor (athlete) =

American track and field athlete

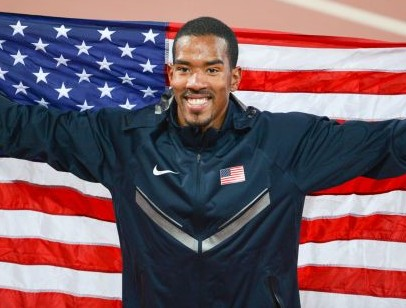
- Taylor after his victory in Beijing 2015

Personal information
- National team: United States
- Born: June 18, 1990 (age 36) Fayetteville, Georgia, U.S.
- Height: 6 ft 2 in (188 cm)
- Weight: 175 lb (79 kg)

Sport
- Sport: Track and field
- Events: Triple jump, long jump
- College team: University of Florida
- Club: Nike
- Coached by: Rana Reider (until 2021)
- Retired: 2024

Achievements and titles
- Personal bests: Triple Jump: 18.21m; Long Jump: 8.19m; 400 m: 45.07
Medal record
Event	1st	2nd	3rd
Olympic Games	2	0	0
World Championships	4	0	0
World Indoor Championships	0	1	0
IAAF World Relays	1	0	0
World Youth Championships	1	0	1
Total	8	1	1
Men's athletics
Representing the United States
Olympic Games
Gold medal – first place	2012 London	Triple jump
Gold medal – first place	2016 Rio de Janeiro	Triple jump
World Championships
Gold medal – first place	2011 Daegu	Triple jump
Gold medal – first place	2015 Beijing	Triple jump
Gold medal – first place	2017 London	Triple jump
Gold medal – first place	2019 Doha	Triple jump
World Indoor Championships
Silver medal – second place	2012 Istanbul	Triple jump
World Relay Championships
Gold medal – first place	2014 Nassau	4×400 m relay
World Junior Championships
Gold medal – first place	2008 Bydgoszcz	4x400 m relay
World Youth Championships
Gold medal – first place	2007 Ostrava	Triple jump
Bronze medal – third place	2007 Ostrava	Long jump
Continental Cup
Gold medal – first place	2018 Ostrava	Triple jump
Gold medal – first place	2018 Ostrava	Mixed 4×400 m relay

Christian Taylor (born June 18, 1990) is a retired American track and field athlete who competed in the triple jump and has a personal record of 18.21 m (59 ft 8 3/4 in), which ranks 2nd on the all-time list.

He was the triple jump champion and long jump bronze medalist at the 2007 World Youth Championships in Athletics. He established himself as a top level triple jumper at the University of Florida, where he won back-to-back NCAA Indoor titles and then consecutive NCAA Outdoor Championship titles in 2010 and 2011. Taylor won his first USA Outdoor national title in 2011.

He followed his national title with a win in the triple jump at the 2011 World Championships, upsetting the field with the tenth best jump in history. He was a member of the 2012 United States Olympic team and won the gold medal in the triple jump at the 2012 Summer Olympics in London. He placed fourth at the 2013 World Championships in Athletics, but regained his title at the 2015 World Championships in Athletics. He won the gold medal in the triple jump at the 2016 Summer Olympics in Rio de Janeiro with a jump of 17.86m. In 2017, Taylor once again stormed to victory in the triple jump at 2017 World Championships in Athletics with a jump of 17.68m. Coming to the 2019 World Championships in Doha as the defending champion, Taylor took his fourth world title in the triple jump by producing a 17.92m jump.

He also competes in the long jump – with a best of 8.19 m (26 ft 10 1/4 in) – and in the sprints to a high level: his best for the 400-meter dash is 45.07 seconds and he has run 20.70 seconds for the 200-meter dash.

In 2019, Taylor announced the formation of "The Athletics Association," an organization of professional track and field athletes around the world, independent of IAAF, to advocate for athlete rights.

== Career ==
=== Early life and career ===
Born in Fayetteville, Georgia to Barbadian parents, he attended Our Lady of Victory Catholic School in Tyrone GA, and first learned how to triple jump there. He also attended Robert J Burch Elementary School and participated in their running club; he later attended Sandy Creek High School and played for their football and track and field teams. He set state high school records in the long jump, triple jump and the 400-meter dash, later going on to score a hat-trick of titles in those events at the 2008 National Scholastic Indoor Championships. He made his first international appearances while he was a high school student: he won the triple jump gold medal at the 2007 World Youth Championships in Athletics and also claimed the long jump bronze. The following year he was a finalist in both jumps at the 2008 World Junior Championships in Athletics.

Taylor went on to attend the University of Florida, recruited by coach Rana Reider, in 2009 and in his first year he won three titles at the Southeastern Conference Indoor Championships (long jump, triple jump, 4×400-meter relay). At the NCAA Indoor Championship he won the triple jump, came sixth in the long jump and helped Florida reach third on the podium in the relay. He closed his first year with a third-place finish in the triple jump at the NCAA Outdoor Championships. Taylor established himself as the one of his country's best with a clearance of 17.18 m in March 2010, which made him the best American triple jumper that year. He was unrivalled in the event collegiately as he won both the SEC Indoor and Outdoor titles, and completed an Indoor/Outdoor NCAA double. On top of this, he won two further SEC titles in the relay, was third in the long jump at the SEC Indoors, and jumped a personal record of 8.19 m as the SEC Outdoors runner-up. Away from collegiate competition, he also won triple and long jump titles at the 2010 NACAC Under-23 Championships, and was the silver medallist behind Kenta Bell at the 2010 USA Outdoor Track and Field Championships.

=== 2011 World Champion ===
He began his 2011 season with a personal and championship record triple jump of 17.36 m to claim the SEC Indoor title ahead of fellow Florida Gator Will Claye. He was also runner-up in the relay and eighth in the long jump. At the 2011 NCAA Indoor Championships their positions were reversed, as Taylor finished second and Claye succeeded his teammate as the NCAA indoor champion. The pair continued their rivalry at the NCAA Outdoor Championships and delivered one of the highest calibre triple jump contests in the history of the competition. A good wind conditions aided the jumpers to marks over 17.30 m in the opening rounds, then Taylor took the lead with a personal record of 17.40 m (wind at the 2.0 m/s limit). Claye regained the lead by a centimetre, only for Taylor to respond with a wind-assisted 17.80 m which was enough to secure a second consecutive NCAA Outdoor title.

The two Florida Gators both took their talents to the 2011 USA Outdoor Track and Field Championships, where they repeated their top-two finish as Taylor claimed his first national title with a wind-assisted 17.49 m. Taylor proved himself to be a contender for a world medal as he defeated all comers at the London Grand Prix, including the reigning world champion Phillips Idowu, with a personal best jump of 17.68 m.

At the 2011 World Championships in Daegu, South Korea, Taylor won the triple jump title with a distance of 17.96 m, a personal best for him and beating defending champion Phillips Idowu. Idowu started the competition with a jump of 17.56 m. Then proceeded to jump 17.38 m and 17.70 m on his second and third attempt and looked poised to win the gold after jumping 17.77 m on his fourth attempt. Taylor never really looked like a serious gold medal threat before his fourth jump. He started with a no mark on his first attempt and only managed to jump 17.04 m and 17.40 m on his second and third attempt, respectively. On Taylor's fourth attempt, he leaped a distance of 17.96 m, a huge improvement from his previous personal best of 17.68 m, and was good enough for the gold medal. The jump was also the tenth best jump in history. Idowu could not respond to Taylor's distance and had to settle for the silver medal.

=== 2012 season ===
He came second to Will Claye at both the USA Indoor Championships and the 2012 IAAF World Indoor Championships, although his clearance of 17.63 m was an indoor personal best. He defeated his rival at the 2012 Prefontaine Classic with a meet record jump of 17.62 m in June.

Taylor defeated Claye by 8 cm at the Olympic Trials as both went on to represent the United States at the 2012 London Olympic Games. Third place at those trials, Walter Davis and no other American achieved a qualifying mark all season, so only the two Americans went to the Olympics.

At the Olympics, Taylor was first in the qualifying round. In the final, Taylor fouled his first two attempts, putting him in danger of being eliminated. On his third attempt he jumped 17.15 to move into 6th place, but more importantly securing an opportunity to take three more attempts. With his fourth jump, he went on to produce his best effort of the season 17.81 m (58 ft 5 in) to win the gold medal. Claye would go on to finish second with a jump of 17.62 m, capturing his second medal of the 2012 games after a bronze in the long jump. For the second year in a row, Taylor's 17.81m was the best triple jump in the world in 2012.

=== 2013 Move to England ===
Taylor's coach, Rana Reider, was hired by British Athletics in late 2012 to work with elite-level British sprinters and jumpers at the High Performance Athletics Centre (HiPAC) at Loughborough University. Taylor followed Reider to the English Midlands after the 2012 London Olympics. Taylor talked about the transition to living and training in England in a "Feature Interview" for Track & Field News magazine April 2014 issue. He said the biggest challenge was the cooler weather (compared to what he enjoyed in Gainesville, Florida), but that he enjoyed living in an apartment in the center of Loughborough and being able to skateboard the one mile to the HiPAC facility.

=== 2014 Outdoor Season, Addition of the 400 Meters ===
In an April 2014 "Feature Interview" for Track & Field News, Taylor said that, after finishing 2013 ranked No. 2 in the world, he and coach Reider planned to treat 2014 as "a down year", since there were no World or Olympic championships. He planned to run a lot more. As a way of mixing-up his training, he planned to compete in some 400 Meter races in the United States, beginning with the Florida Relays in Gainesville on April 4–5, 2014. Taylor once ran 400 Meters in 45.34 seconds during his freshman year (2009) at the University of Florida. [Note: Running under 45 seconds would place Taylor amongst the world's elite quarter-milers.] At the Drake Relays in Des Moines, Iowa, Taylor ran 45.17 making him a unique dual threat.

=== 2015; American record ===
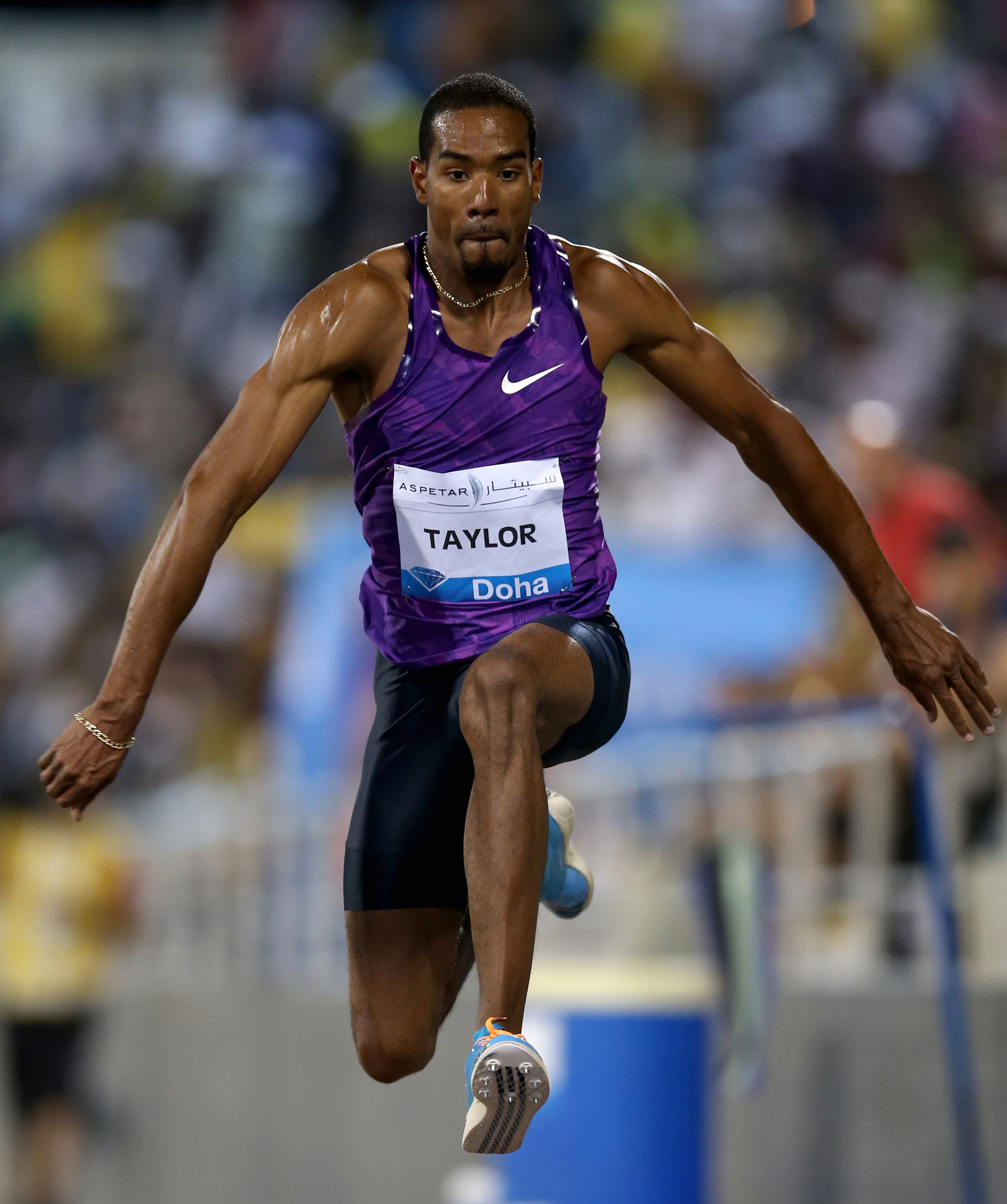
Taylor at the Qatar Athletic Super Grand Prix in 2015

Taylor opened season in a competitive event at Qatar Athletic Super Grand Prix. His 18.04 m (59 ft 2 in) on his final attempt equalled the number 4 performer in history, Teddy Tamgho. Coming into the meet, that would be the third best mark, however earlier in the rounds 21-year-old Pedro Pablo Pichardo had jumped 18.06 m (59 ft 3 in), so Taylor was jumping just to try to get out of second place, Tamgho in third had already hobbled off the track injured.

This was the first competition in history to have two men jump over 18 metres, already called "the greatest triple jump competition ever.". Two weeks later, Pichardo improved again to 18.08m and in July, Taylor became the second man in history to jump 18 metres twice in the same competition at Lausanne while improving his personal best to 18.06m.

Taylor overcame Pichardo at the 2015 World Championships in Beijing. His jump of 18.21 m (59 ft 8 3/4 in) was the No. 2 jump in history and beat the Cuban by almost 50 cm. The jump ranks just 8 cm behind the World Record of Jonathan Edwards. It set a new American record in the event. Taylor then went on to overtake his Cuban rival again at the final stop of the Diamond League, taking home his fourth consecutive Diamond League title with a jump of 17.59m.

=== 2016 Olympic Games ===
At the Olympic Trials, Claye beat Taylor 17.65m to 17.39m, but Taylor finished second and qualified to go to Rio to defend his Olympic championship from London. Chris Benard was the third American also qualifying to Rio.

In the Olympics in Rio, again Taylor was the No. 1 qualifier from the qualifying round. In the final, Taylor's first attempt was 17.86 m (58 ft 7 in). This mark was enough to edge out his teammate Will Claye (17.76) and China's Dong Bin (17.58). This feat made Taylor the first repeat champion in the Triple Jump since 1976. Russian Viktor Saneyev was the last to achieve this feat, receiving 4 medals in his career. Following the competition Taylor said "The job is done. I never thought on my first jump that would be the gold medal. I wanted it so much. It came together, the stars aligned."

=== 2017 ===
At the Prefontaine Classic, Taylor jumped the fourth best jump in history, 18.11 m (59 ft 4 3/4 in). As defending champion, Taylor was given an automatic entry into the World Championships. As Diamond League Champion, he also earned an automatic entry into the World Championships, so he chose not to compete at the American championships, won by Claye in his personal best 17.91m. At the World Championships, Benard was the No. 1 qualifier, but a non-factor in the final. After Claye took the first round lead, Taylor took over the lead in the second and hit his 17.68m winner in the third round to successfully defend his world championship.

=== 2021 ===
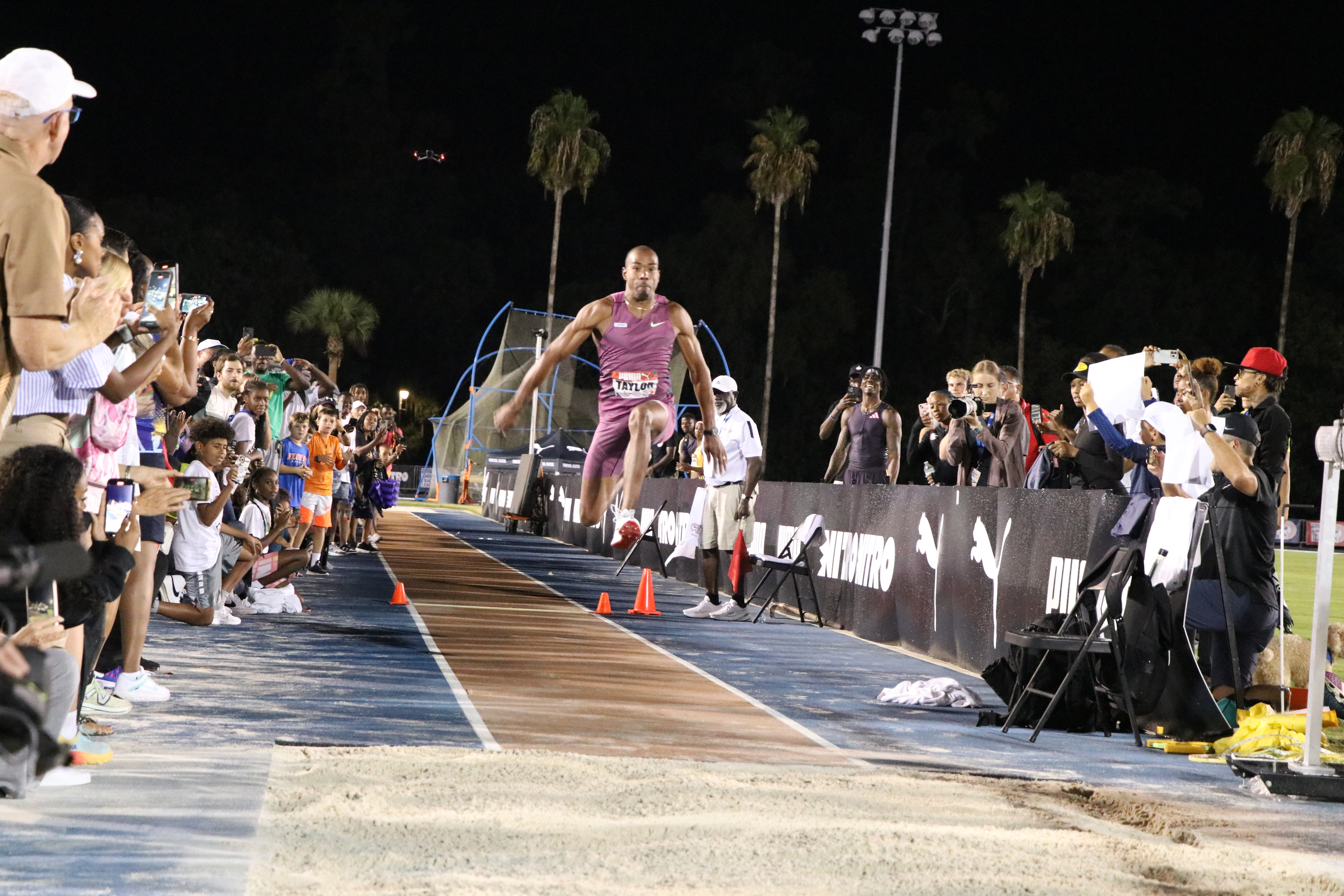
Final jump of Taylor's career at the Holloway Pro Classic at the University of Florida

Taylor did not participate in the Tokyo Olympic Games due a chronic Achilles injury.

Taylor left the British training group of sprint coach Rana Reider once reports emerged of the SafeSport investigation of Reider for sexual misconduct.

=== Major competition record ===
Year	Competition	Venue	Position	Event	Notes
Representing the United States
2007	World Youth Championships	Ostrava, Czech Republic	3rd	Long jump	7.29 m
2007	World Youth Championships	Ostrava, Czech Republic	1st	Triple jump	15.98 m
2008	World Junior Championships	Bydgoszcz, Poland	7th	Long jump	7.41 m (wind: -0.1 m/s)
2008	World Junior Championships	Bydgoszcz, Poland	8th	Triple jump	15.61 m (wind: -0.7 m/s)
2008	World Junior Championships	Bydgoszcz, Poland	1st (h)	4 × 400 m relay	3:05.25
2010	NACAC U23 Championships	Miramar, Florida, United States	1st	Long jump	7.82 m (wind: +0.0 m/s)
2010	NACAC U23 Championships	Miramar, Florida, United States	1st	Triple jump	16.66 m (wind: 1.2 m/s)
2011	World Championships	Daegu, South Korea	1st	Triple jump	17.96 m
2012	World Indoor Championships	Istanbul, Turkey	2nd	Triple jump	17.63 m
2012	Olympic Games	London, United Kingdom	1st	Triple jump	17.81 m
2013	World Championships	Moscow, Russia	4th	Triple jump	17.20 m
2014	World Relays	Nassau, Bahamas	1st	4 × 400 m relay	2:57.25
2015	World Championships	Beijing, China	1st	Triple jump	18.21 m AR
2016	Olympic Games	Rio de Janeiro, Brazil	1st	Triple jump	17.86 m
2017	World Championships	London, England	1st	Triple jump	17.68 m
2019	World Championships	Doha, Qatar	1st	Triple jump	17.92 m
2022	World Championships	Eugene, United States	18th (q)	Triple jump	16.48 m

=== USA National Track and field Championships ===
Year	Competition	Venue	Position	Event	Notes
2016	USA Track and Field Olympic Trials	Hayward Field Eugene, Oregon	2nd	Triple jump	17.39 m (57 ft 1/2 in)
2015	USA Outdoor Track and Field Championships	Eugene, Oregon	7th	Long jump	8.01 m (26 ft 3 1/4 in)
2014	USA Outdoor Track and Field Championships	Hornet Stadium (Sacramento) Sacramento, California	2nd	Triple jump	17.37 m (56 ft 11 3/4 in)
2013	USA Outdoor Track and Field Championships	Drake Stadium, Des Moines, Iowa	6th	Long jump	8.07 m (26 ft 5 1/2 in)
2012	USA Track and Field Olympic Trials	Hayward Field Eugene, Oregon	1st	Triple jump	17.63 m (57 ft 10 in)
2012	USA Track and Field Olympic Trials	Hayward Field Eugene, Oregon	4th	Long jump	8.12 m (26 ft 7 1/2 in)
2011	USA Outdoor Track and Field Championships	Hayward Field, Eugene, Oregon	1st	Triple jump	17.49 m (57 ft 4 1/2 in)
2011	USA Outdoor Track and Field Championships	Hayward Field, Eugene, Oregon	4th	Long jump	8.07 m (26 ft 5 1/2 in)
2010	USA Outdoor Track and Field Championships	Drake Stadium, Des Moines, Iowa	2nd	Triple jump	16.76 m (54 ft 11 3/4 in)
2010	USA Outdoor Track and Field Championships	Drake Stadium, Des Moines, Iowa	12th	Long jump	7.63 m (25 ft 1/4 in)
2008	USA Junior Outdoor Track and Field Championships	Jesse Owens Memorial Stadium, Columbus, Ohio	3rd	Triple jump	16.05 m (52 ft 7 3/4 in)
2008	USA Junior Outdoor Track and Field Championships	Jesse Owens Memorial Stadium, Columbus, Ohio	2nd	Long jump	7.60 m (24 ft 11 in)
2007	USA Youth Outdoor Track and Field Trials	The Sports Complex at Benedictine University, Lisle, Illinois	2nd	Triple jump	15.49 m (50 ft 9 3/4 in)

== Personal bests ==
Event	Best (m)	Venue	Date
Triple jump (outdoor)	18.21 AR	Beijing, China	August 27, 2015
Triple jump (indoor)	17.63	Istanbul, Turkey	March 11, 2012
Long jump (outdoor)	8.19	Knoxville, Tennessee	May 15, 2010
Long jump (indoor)	8.02	Fayetteville, Arkansas	February 13, 2009

- All information taken from IAAF profile.

== Personal life ==
Taylor is a Christian. In April 2019, Taylor became engaged to Austrian hurdler Beate Schrott and in 2021 they married in Austria, celebrating the wedding at Schloss Gurhof and a few weeks later in Jacksonville.

== See also ==
- Florida Gators
- List of Olympic medalists in athletics (men)
- List of University of Florida Olympians
