= Azerbaijan at the 2019 World Athletics Championships =

- WA code: AZE

in Doha, Qatar 27 September 2019 – 6 October 2019
- Competitors: 4 (3 men and 1 woman) in 3 events

World Athletics Championships appearances
- 1993; 1995; 1997; 1999; 2001; 2003; 2005; 2007; 2009; 2011; 2013; 2015; 2017; 2019; 2022; 2023; 2025

Azerbaijan competed at the 2019 World Athletics Championships in Doha, Qatar, from 27 September to 6 October 2019. Azerbaijan was represented by 4 athletes.

== Results ==
=== Men ===
Track and road events

Athlete	Event	Final	
Athlete	Event	Result	Rank
Evans Chebet	Marathon	did not finish	

Field events

Athlete	Event	Qualification		Final	
Athlete	Event	Result	Rank	Result	Rank
Nazim Babayev	Triple jump	16.65	19	did not advance	
Alexis Copello	Triple jump	16.95	6 q	17.10 SB	7

=== Women ===
Field events

Athlete	Event	Qualification		Final	
Athlete	Event	Result	Rank	Result	Rank
Hanna Skydan	Hammer throw	73.32 SB	4 Q	72.83	7
