= Fang Yaoqing =

Chinese athlete (born 1996)

Personal information
- Born: 20 April 1996 (age 30)

Sport
- Sport: Athletics
- Event: Triple jump
Medal record
Men's athletics
Representing China
Asian Indoor Championships
Gold medal – first place	2023 Astana	Triple jump

Fang Yaoqing (Chinese: 方耀庆; born 20 April 1996) is a Chinese athlete specialising in the triple jump. He represented his country at the 2017 World Championships without reaching the final. Earlier, he won two silver medals at the 2013 World Youth Championships.

His personal bests in the event are 17.17 metres outdoors (+0.2 m/s, Chongqing 2019) and 17.20 metres indoors (Nur-Sultan 2023).

== International competitions ==
Year	Competition	Venue	Position	Event	Notes
Representing China
2013	World Youth Championships	Donetsk, Ukraine	2nd	Long jump	7.53 m
2013	World Youth Championships	Donetsk, Ukraine	2nd	Triple jump	16.48 m
2014	Asian Junior Championships	Taipei, Taiwan	5th	Long jump	7.47 m
2014	Asian Junior Championships	Taipei, Taiwan	1st	Triple jump	16.32 m
2014	World Junior Championships	Eugene, United States	6th	Triple jump	16.15 m
2017	World Championships	London, United Kingdom	26th (q)	Triple jump	16.17 m
2019	World Championships	Doha, Qatar	10th	Triple jump	16.65 m
2021	Olympic Games	Tokyo, Japan	8th	Triple jump	17.01 m
2023	Asian Indoor Championships	Astana, Kazakhstan	1st	Triple jump	17.20 m
2023	Asian Championships	Bangkok, Thailand	4th	Triple jump	16.44 m
2023	World Championships	Budapest, Hungary	6th	Triple jump	17.01 m
2023	Asian Games	Hangzhou, China	2nd	Triple jump	16.93 m
2024	World Indoor Championships	Glasgow, United Kingdom	4th	Triple jump	16.93 m
2024	Olympic Games	Paris, France	31st (q)	Triple jump	15.85 m
