= Cuba at the 2009 World Championships in Athletics =

- WA code: CUB
- National federation: Federación Cubana de Atletismo

in Berlin
- Competitors: 35 (14 men, 21 women)
- Medals: Gold 1 Silver 4 Bronze 1 Total 6

World Championships in Athletics appearances
- 1983; 1987; 1991; 1993; 1995; 1997; 1999; 2001; 2003; 2005; 2007; 2009; 2011; 2013; 2015; 2017; 2019; 2022; 2023; 2025

Cuba competed at the 2009 World Championships in Athletics from 15 to 23 August. A team of 35 athletes was announced in preparation for the competition. Selected athletes have achieved one of the competition's qualifying standards. Triple jumper Yargelis Savigne entered the competition as the reigning World Champion, while Olympic champion and world record holder Dayron Robles aimed to gain his first World Championship medal. Decathlete Leonel Suárez is the world leader in his event in the run up to the competition. The three entrants for the men's triple jump were also among the strongest athletes in their event that year.

== Team selection ==
Track and road events

| Event | Athletes | |
| Event | Men | Women |
|---|---|---|
| 200 metres | | Roxana Díaz |
| 400 metres | William Collazo | Indira Terrero |
| 800 metres | Yeimer López | Zulia Calatayud |
| 100 metres hurdles | — | Anay Tejeda |
| 110 metres hurdles | Dayron Robles; Dayron Capetillo | — |
| 400 metres hurdles | Omar Cisneros | |
| 4×400 metres relay | Yunior Díaz; Omar Cisneros; William Collazo; Yeimer López | Indira Terrero; Zulia Calatayud; Roxana Díaz; Daisumari Bonne; Susana Clement; Diosmeli Peña |

Field and combined events

| Event | Athletes | |
| Event | Men | Women |
|---|---|---|
| Long jump | Ibrahim Camejo | Yarianny Argüelles |
| Triple jump | Yoandris Betanzos; Alexis Copello; Arnie David Giralt | Yargelis Savigne; Mabel Gay |
| Shot put | Carlos Véliz | Misleydis González; Yaniuvis López; Mailín Vargas |
| Discus throw | | Yarelis Barrios; Yarisley Collado; Yania Ferrales |
| Hammer throw | | Arasay Thondike |
| Javelin throw | Guillermo Martínez | Osleidys Menéndez; Yanet Cruz; Yainelis Ribeaux |
| Decathlon | Leonel Suárez; Yordanis García; Yunior Díaz | — |

== Results ==
=== Men ===
Track and road events

| Event | Athletes | Heat Round 1 | | Heat Round 2 | | Semifinal | | Final | |
| Event | Athletes | Result | Rank | Result | Rank | Result | Rank | Result | Rank |
|---|---|---|---|---|---|---|---|---|---|
| 400 m | William Collazo | 45.52 | 10 Q | - | | 44.93 | 7 | did not advance | |
| 800 m | Yeimer López | 1:48.04 | 27 Q | - | | 1:45.33 | 6 Q | 1:47.80 | 10 |
| 110 m hurdles | Dayron Robles | 13.67 | 24 Q | - | | DNF | | did not advance | |
| 110 m hurdles | Dayron Capetillo | 13.61 | 18 q | - | | 13.55 | 19 | did not advance | |
| 400 m hurdles | Omar Cisneros | 49.27 | 9 q | - | | 49.21 | 11 | did not advance | |
| 4 × 400 m relay | Yunior Díaz; Omar Cisneros; William Collazo; Yeimer López | | | | | | | | |

Field events

| Event | Athletes | Qualification | | Final | |
| Event | Athletes | Result | Rank | Result | Rank |
|---|---|---|---|---|---|
| Long jump | Ibrahim Camejo | 7.71 | 33 | did not advance | |
| Triple jump | Yoandris Betanzos | 16.77 | 17 | did not advance | |
| Triple jump | Alexis Copello | 16.99 | 11 q | 17.36 | Bronze medal |
| Triple jump | Arnie David Giralt | 17.15 | 5 Q | 17.26 | 5 |
| Shot put | Carlos Véliz | 19.62 | 13 | did not advance | |
| Javelin throw | Guillermo Martínez | 82.50 | 3 Q | 86.41 SB | Silver medal |
| Decathlon | Leonel Suárez | - | | 8640 | Silver medal |
| Decathlon | Yordanis García | - | | 8387 | 8 |
| Decathlon | Yunior Díaz | - | | 8357 PB | 9 |

=== Women ===
Track and road events

| Event | Athletes | Heat Round 1 | | Heat Round 2 | | Semifinal | | Final | |
| Event | Athletes | Result | Rank | Result | Rank | Result | Rank | Result | Rank |
|---|---|---|---|---|---|---|---|---|---|
| 200 m | Roxana Díaz | | | | | | | | |
| 400 m | Indira Terrero | 51.98 | 3 Q | - | | 51.87 | 5 | did not advance | |
| 800 m | Zulia Calatayud | 2:02.33 | 1 Q | - | | 2:01.53 | 7 | did not advance | |
| 100 m hurdles | Anay Tejeda | 12.82 SB | 3 Q | - | | 12.82 SB | 4 | did not advance | |
| 4 × 400 m relay | Indira Terrero; Zulia Calatayud; Roxana Díaz; Daisumari Bonne; Susana Clement; Diosmeli Peña | 3:27.36 SB | 5 q | - | | | | 3:36.99 | 8 |

Field and combined events

| Event | Athletes | Qualification | | Final | |
| Event | Athletes | Result | Rank | Result | Rank |
|---|---|---|---|---|---|
| Long jump | Yarianny Argüelles | 6.32 | 22 | did not advance | |
| Triple jump | Yargelis Savigne | 14.53 | 2 Q | 14.95 | Gold medal |
| Triple jump | Mabel Gay | 14.53 | 3 q | 14.61 SB | Silver medal |
| Shot put | Misleydis González | 18.62 | 7 Q | 18.74 | 8 |
| Shot put | Yaniuvis López | 17.71 | 18 | did not advance | |
| Shot put | Mailín Vargas | 18.14 | 11 q | 18.67 | 9 |
| Discus throw | Yarelis Barrios | 62.19 | 5 Q | 65.31 SB | Silver medal |
| Discus throw | Yarisley Collado | 60.37 | 14 | did not advance | |
| Discus throw | Yania Ferrales | 58.24 | 25 | did not advance | |
| Javelin throw | Osleidys Menéndez | 61.94 | 5 q | 63.11 SB | 7 |
| Javelin throw | Yanet Cruz | 56.19 | 22 | did not advance | |
| Javelin throw | Yainelis Ribeaux | 57.38 | 16 | did not advance | |
| Hammer throw | Arasay Thondike | 68.97 | 16 | did not advance | |
