= Netherlands Antilles at the World Athletics Championships =

- WA code: AHO
- National federation: Netherlands Antilles Athletics Federation
- Medals: Gold 0 Silver 0 Bronze 0 Total 0

World Athletics Championships appearances (overview)
- 1983; 1987; 1991; 1993; 1995; 1997; 1999; 2001; 2003; 2005; 2007; 2009

The Netherlands Antilles competed at the World Athletics Championships on twelve occasions between 1983 and 2009. Its competing country code was AHO. Upon the dissolution of the state, the international eligibility of the nation's athletes automatically transferred to the Netherlands. The country did not win any medals at the competition. Its best performance was by Churandy Martina, who finished fifth the 100 m and 200 m finals at the 2007 World Championships in Athletics. The men's 4 × 100 metres relay featuring Geronimo Goeloe, Charlton Rafaela, Jairo Duzant, and Martina was also sixth place in the 4 × 100 metres relay final at the 2005 World Championships in Athletics.
