= 2019 World Athletics Championships – Men's triple jump =

Men's triple jump at the 2019 World Championships
- Venue: Khalifa International Stadium
- Dates: 27 September (qualification); 29 September (final)
- Competitors: 34 from 20 nations
- Winning distance: 17.92

Medalists
gold medal	Christian Taylor	United States
silver medal	Will Claye	United States
bronze medal	Hugues Fabrice Zango	Burkina Faso

The men's triple jump at the 2019 World Athletics Championships was held at the Khalifa International Stadium in Doha from 27 to 29 September 2019.

== Summary ==
On the second jump of the competition, Will Claye took the lead with a 17.61m. Two jumpers later, Cristian Nápoles went 17.36m, then Pedro Pablo Pichardo, now jumping for Portugal, jumped 17.49m. That held through the round. In the second round, Claye improved to 17.72m and Nápoles improved to 17.38m before Hugues Fabrice Zango bounded into contention with a 17.46m African record. After two rounds, defending everything Christian Taylor had not landed a legal jump. Faced with do or die, Taylor made 17.42m to be allowed to continue in the competition. After Claye improved to 17.74m and Pichardo improved to 17.62m, Taylor's fourth attempt of 17.86m put him into the lead. In the fifth round, Zango improved the African record to 17.56m but still wasn't on the podium, while Taylor produced the capper 17.92 m (58 ft 9 1/2 in). The only one to improve in the final round was Zango, his third African record of the competition was yet another 10 cm improvement to 17.66 to snatch the bronze medal.

Since 2011 the triple jump story remains virtually the same, Taylor in first, his former University of Florida teammate, Claye slightly behind.

== Records ==
Before the competition records were as follows:

World record	Jonathan Edwards (GBR)	18.29 m	Gothenburg, Sweden	7 August 1995
Championship record	Jonathan Edwards (GBR)	18.29 m	Gothenburg, Sweden	7 August 1995
World Leading	Will Claye (USA)	18.14 m	Long Beach, United States	29 June 2019
African Record	Tarik Bouguetaïb (MAR)	17.37 m	Khémisset, Morocco	14 July 2007
Asian Record	Li Yanxi (CHN)	17.59 m	Jinan, China	26 October 2009
North, Central American and Caribbean record	Christian Taylor (USA)	18.21 m	Beijing, China	27 August 2015
South American Record	Jadel Gregório (BRA)	17.90 m	Belém, Brazil	20 May 2007
European Record	Jonathan Edwards (GBR)	18.29 m	Gothenburg, Sweden	7 August 1995
Oceanian record	Kenneth Lorraway (AUS)	17.46 m	London, Great Britain	7 August 1982

The following records were set at the competition:

Record	Perf.	Athlete	Nat.	Date
African	17.66m	Hugues Fabrice Zango	BUR	29 Sep 2019
Burkinabé	17.66m	Hugues Fabrice Zango	BUR	29 Sep 2019

== Qualification standard ==
The standard to qualify automatically for entry was 16.95 m.

== Schedule ==
The event schedule, in local time (UTC+3), was as follows:

Date	Time	Round
27 September	19:25	Qualification
29 September	21:45	Final

== Results ==
=== Qualification ===
Qualification: Qualifying Performance 17.10 (Q) or at least 12 best performers (q) advanced to the final.

Rank	Group	Name	Nationality	#1	#2	#3	Result	Notes
1	A	Pedro Pichardo	Portugal	17.38			17.38	Q
2	A	Hugues Fabrice Zango	Burkina Faso	16.60	17.17		17.17	Q
3	B	Christian Taylor	United States	16.99	16.94	—	16.99	q
4	A	Donald Scott	United States	x	16.47	16.99	16.99	q
5	A	Will Claye	United States	16.83	15.25	16.97	16.97	q
6	B	Alexis Copello	Azerbaijan	16.67	x	16.95	16.95	q
7	B	Jordan Díaz	Cuba	16.61	16.60	16.93	16.93	q
8	A	Almir dos Santos	Brazil	16.92	—	16.21	16.92	q
9	B	Fang Yaoqing	China	x	16.92	x	16.92	q
10	B	Wu Ruiting	China	x	16.90	16.80	16.90	q
11	A	Cristian Nápoles	Cuba	16.84	16.75	16.88	16.88	q
12	B	Necati Er	Turkey	x	16.65	16.87	16.87	q
13	B	Omar Craddock	United States	16.87	x	x	16.87	
14	B	Dmitriy Sorokin	Authorised Neutral Athletes	16.68	x	16.86	16.86	
15	B	Nelson Évora	Portugal	16.26	16.67	16.80	16.80	
16	A	Zhu Yaming	China	16.79	16.75	16.48	16.79	
17	B	Benjamin Williams	Great Britain & N.I.	15.89	16.77	15.55	16.77	
18	A	Alexey Fyodorov	Authorised Neutral Athletes	16.49	16.71	16.16	16.71	
19	A	Nazim Babayev	Azerbaijan	16.65	16.38	16.51	16.65	
20	A	Yasser Mohamed Triki	Algeria	16.34	16.62	16.51	16.62	
21	B	Georgi Tsonov	Bulgaria	x	16.61	16.08	16.61	
22	A	Benjamin Compaoré	France	16.59	16.35	16.15	16.59	
23	A	Simo Lipsanen	Finland	16.44	16.47	x	16.47	
24	A	Andy Díaz	Cuba	x	16.41	16.39	16.41	
25	A	Chengetayi Mapaya	Zimbabwe	14.80	x	16.36	16.36	
26	B	Jean-Marc Pontvianne	France	16.02	16.31	x	16.31	
27	B	Alexsandro Melo	Brazil	15.90	16.26	x	16.26	
28	A	Latario Collie-Minns	Bahamas	16.26	x	x	16.26	
29	B	Levon Aghasyan	Armenia	16.24	15.98	16.04	16.24	
30	B	Lathone Collie-Minns	Bahamas	15.62	13.50	15.89	15.89	
31	A	Ruslan Kurbanov	Uzbekistan	x	15.86	x	15.86	
32	A	Andrea Dallavalle	Italy	x	14.63	15.09	15.09	
33	B	Jordan Scott	Jamaica	14.73	—	—	14.73	

=== Final ===
The final was started on 29 September at 21:46.

Rank	Name	Nationality	Round						Mark	Notes
Rank	Name	Nationality	1	2	3	4	5	6	Mark	Notes
1st place, gold medalist(s)	Christian Taylor	United States	x	x	17.42	17.86	17.92	17.54	17.92	SB
2nd place, silver medalist(s)	Will Claye	United States	17.61	17.72	17.53	17.74	17.74	17.66	17.74	
3rd place, bronze medalist(s)	Hugues Fabrice Zango	Burkina Faso	17.18	17.46	17.29	x	17.56	17.66	17.66	AR
4	Pedro Pichardo	Portugal	17.49	17.28	17.49	17.62	17.60	17.00	17.62	SB
5	Cristian Nápoles	Cuba	17.36	17.38	x	x	–	–	17.38	PB
6	Donald Scott	United States	x	16.57	17.05	x	15.08	17.17	17.17	
7	Alexis Copello	Azerbaijan	x	x	17.10	x	x	–	17.10	SB
8	Jordan Díaz	Cuba	15.88	16.86	17.10	16.86	17.06	16.69	17.06	
9	Wu Ruiting	China	16.97	16.86	16.88				16.97	
10	Fang Yaoqing	China	15.94	16.42	16.65				16.65	
11	Necati Er	Turkey	16.34	x	15.62				16.34	
12	Almir dos Santos	Brazil	x	x	15.01				15.01	
