= 2023 Asian Athletics Championships – Men's triple jump =

Men's triple jump at the 2023 Asian Athletics Championships
- Venue: National Stadium
- Location: Bangkok, Thailand
- Dates: 13 July
- Competitors: 17 from 12 nations
- Winning distance: 16.92 m

Medalists
gold medal	Abdulla Aboobacker	India
silver medal	Hikaru Ikehata	Japan
bronze medal	Kim Jang-woo	South Korea

The men's triple jump event at the 2023 Asian Athletics Championships was held on 13 July.

== Records ==
Records before the 2023 Asian Athletics Championships
Record	Athlete (nation)	Distance (m)	Location	Date
World record	Jonathan Edwards (GBR)	18.29	Gothenburg, Sweden	7 August 1995
Asian record	Li Yanxi (CHN)	17.59	Jinan, China	26 October 2009
Championship record	Chen Yanping (CHN)	17.22	Kuala Lumpur, Malaysia	23 October 1991
World leading	Jaydon Hibbert (JAM)	17.87	Baton Rouge, United States	13 May 2023
Asian leading	Praveen Chithravel (IND)	17.37	Havana, Cuba	6 May 2023

== Results ==
Rank	Name	Nationality	#1	#2	#3	#4	#5	#6	Result	Notes
1st place, gold medalist(s)	Abdulla Aboobacker	India	x	15.80	16.54	16.92	16.40	–	16.92	
2nd place, silver medalist(s)	Hikaru Ikehata	Japan	16.18	16.09	16.42	x	x	16.73	16.73	
3rd place, bronze medalist(s)	Kim Jang-woo	South Korea	16.22	16.52	x	x	x	16.59	16.59	
4	Fang Yaoqing	China	16.39	16.34	16.00	16.44	16.41	16.00	16.44	
5	Ivan Denisov	Uzbekistan	x	16.07	15.48	x	16.08	16.04	16.08	
6	Ronnie Malipay	Philippines	15.88	15.93	15.46	16.08	15.44	15.54	16.08	
7	Nattapong Srinonta	Thailand	16.02	x	x	x	x	x	16.02	
8	Wu Ruiting	China	x	15.74	15.93	15.54	x	–	15.93	
9	Yu Kyu-min	South Korea	15.59	x	15.83				15.83	
10	Li Yun-chen	Chinese Taipei	15.05	15.60	x				15.60	
11	Andre Anura Anuar	Malaysia	14.94	15.50	x				15.50	
12	Phumiphat Khunmangkom	Thailand	x	15.48	x				15.48	
13	Riku Ito	Japan	15.06	15.22	15.47				15.47	
14	Salem Saleh El-Jerbi	Oman	14.62	15.18	x				15.18	
15	Wong Chun Wing	Hong Kong	14.75	14.69	14.84				14.84	
16	Pratchaya Tepparak	Thailand	14.72	x	x				14.72	
17	Che Long Kin	Macau	x	x	14.34				14.34	
