= Will Claye =

American triple jumper and long jumper (born 1991)

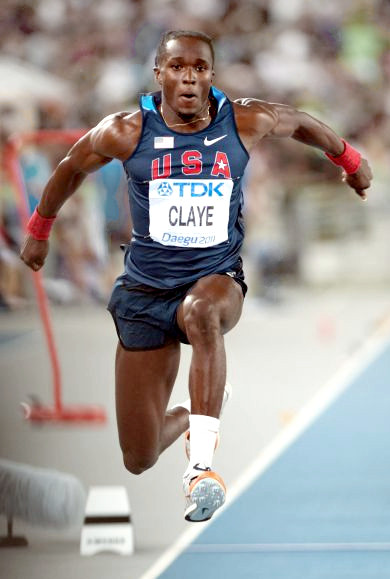
- Claye at the 2011 World Championships Athletics in Daegu

Personal information
- National team: United States
- Born: June 13, 1991 (age 35) Tucson, Arizona, United States
- Height: 5 ft 11 in (180 cm)
- Weight: 160 lb (73 kg)

Sport
- Sport: Track and field
- Events: Triple jump, long jump
- College team: University of Florida
- Turned pro: 2012
- Coached by: Jeremy Fischer
Medal record
Event	1st	2nd	3rd
Olympic Games	0	2	1
World Championships	0	2	2
World Indoor Championships	2	0	0
Total	2	4	3
Olympic Games
Silver medal – second place	2012 London	Triple jump
Silver medal – second place	2016 Rio de Janeiro	Triple jump
Bronze medal – third place	2012 London	Long jump
World Championships
Silver medal – second place	2017 London	Triple jump
Silver medal – second place	2019 Doha	Triple jump
Bronze medal – third place	2011 Daegu	Triple jump
Bronze medal – third place	2013 Moscow	Triple jump
World Indoor Championships
Gold medal – first place	2012 Istanbul	Triple jump
Gold medal – first place	2018 Birmingham	Triple jump
NACAC Championships
Bronze medal – third place	2025 Freeport	Triple jump

Will Claye (born June 13, 1991) is an American track and field athlete who competes in the long jump and triple jump. He won a bronze medal in 2011 World Championships in Athletics and the gold medals at the 2012 IAAF World Indoor Championships and 2018 IAAF World Indoor Championships. In his Olympic debut at the 2012 Summer Olympics, Claye won a bronze medal in long jump and a silver medal in triple jump. He repeated his silver medal in the triple jump four years later. His personal best of 18.14 m (59 ft 6 in), set at the Jim Bush Southern California USATF Championships in Long Beach on June 29, 2019, ranks him as the No. 4 triple jumper of all time.

Will was two-time Arizona Interscholastic Association high school champion in the triple jump, establishing a new state record of over 50 feet. He attended Mountain Pointe High School in Phoenix, Arizona, where he was named to the 2008 USA Today's All-USA Team in both jumps. Claye enrolled early at the University of Oklahoma, but later transferred to the University of Florida.

Will Claye later went on to record the rap song "IDGAF" with YG.

== Career ==
=== College career ===
While attending the University of Oklahoma, Claye competed for the Oklahoma Sooners men's track and field team. He won the 2009 NCAA Men's Outdoor Track and Field Championship in the triple jump on his 18th birthday, establishing a new American junior record of 56 ft 4.75 in (17.19 m). During his second year at Oklahoma, Claye's performance dropped off due to stress fractures in his back and leg. After the 2010 outdoor season, he transferred to the University of Florida to join defending outdoor champion Christian Taylor and training under legendary jumps coach Dick Booth. The collegiate 2011 indoor season was capped by Florida winning the NCAA Indoor National Championship, thanks to Coach Booth's jumpers scoring 30 of the Gators' 52 points, led by Claye's national title in the triple jump and his runner-up finish in the long jump.

Claye finished second at the 2011 NCAA Men's Outdoor Track and Field Championships behind Taylor. The two went on to finish in the same order at the 2011 USA Outdoor Track and Field Championships. Claye finished his collegiate career at Florida, after his junior year, ending with eight "All American" honors and with two NCAA titles (the 2009 outdoor triple jump title and the 2011 indoor title); he won both the triple and long jumps at the 2011 SEC Championships.

=== 2011 World Championships ===
In 2011 World Championships in Athletics in Daegu, South Korea, Claye was 9th in long jump and 3rd in triple jump. Claye, and Gator teammate Christian Taylor, withdrew from the University of Florida after the 2011 Worlds, and turned professional in order to concentrate on preparing for the 2012 London Olympics. He is sponsored by Nike and is training under the direction of Martin Smith.

=== 2012 Olympic Year ===
Claye established the early, indoor season, leading mark in the triple jump of 57 ft 0.75 in (17.39 m) at the 2012 Tyson Invitational on February 11 in Fayetteville, Arkansas (his only valid jump in the elite competition). At the 2012 USA Indoor Championships in February Claye not only won the triple jump, but he exceeded 57 feet on 3 consecutive jumps, finishing with a world-leading mark of 57 ft 10.25 in (17.63 m). In addition, Claye finished second in the long jump with a mark of 26 ft 3.75 in (8.02 m). He went on to claim his first world title at the 2012 IAAF World Indoor Championships. He won the triple jump ahead of Christian Taylor with a clearance of 17.70 m and also placed fourth in the long jump. In the outdoor season, he began with runner-up finishes at both the Shanghai and Eugene legs of the 2012 Diamond League.

At the 2012 London Olympics Claye first won the bronze medal in long jump, then followed up by winning the silver medal in triple jump five days later. He is the first man to win medals in both the long and triple jumps at the same Olympics since Naoto Tajima of Japan at the 1936 Berlin Summer Olympics.

=== 2013 World Championships ===
In 2013 World Championships in Athletics in Moscow, Claye triple jumped 17.52 m (57 ft 5 3/4 in) (Wind: +0.5 m/s).

=== 2015 World Championships ===
In 2015 World Championships in Athletics in Beijing, Claye triple jumped 16.41 m (53 ft 10 in) (Wind: +0.2 m/s).

=== 2016 Olympic Year ===
In Summer Olympics, Claye triple jumped 17.76 m (58 ft 3 in) (Wind: +0.4 m/s) to earn a silver medal.

== Major competition record ==
Year	Competition	Venue	Position	Event	Notes
Representing the United States
2009	Pan American Junior Championships	Port of Spain, Trinidad and Tobago	1st	Triple jump	16.57 m
2011	World Championships	Daegu, South Korea	9th	Long jump	8.10 m
2011	World Championships	Daegu, South Korea	3rd	Triple jump	17.50 m
2012	World Indoor Championships	Istanbul, Turkey	4th	Long jump	8.04 m
2012	World Indoor Championships	Istanbul, Turkey	1st	Triple jump	17.70 m
2012	Olympic Games	London, United Kingdom	3rd	Long jump	8.12 m
2012	Olympic Games	London, United Kingdom	2nd	Triple jump	17.62 m
2013	World Championships	Moscow, Russia	3rd	Triple jump	17.52 m
2015	World Championships	Beijing, China	19th (q)	Triple jump	16.41 m
2016	Olympic Games	Rio de Janeiro, Brazil	2nd	Triple jump	17.76 m
2017	World Championships	London, United Kingdom	2nd	Triple jump	17.63 m
2018	World Indoor Championships	Birmingham, United Kingdom	1st	Triple jump	17.43 m
2019	World Championships	Doha, Qatar	2nd	Triple jump	17.74 m
2021	Olympic Games	Tokyo, Japan	4th	Triple jump	17.44 m
2022	World Indoor Championships	Belgrade, Serbia	4th	Triple jump	17.19 m
2022	World Championships	Eugene, United States	11th	Triple jump	16.54 m
2023	World Championships	Budapest, Hungary	7th	Triple jump	16.99 m
2025	World Indoor Championships	Nanjing, China	10th	Triple jump	16.31 m
2025	NACAC Championships	Freeport, Bahamas	3rd	Triple jump	16.36 m
2025	World Championships	Tokyo, Japan	19th (q)	Triple jump	16.52 m

=== USA National Track and field Championships ===
Year	Competition	Venue	Position	Event	Notes
2021	United States Olympic Trials	Eugene, Oregon	1st	Triple jump	17.21 m (56 ft 5 1/2 in)
2021	United States Olympic Trials	Eugene, Oregon	24th	Long jump	7.18 m (23 ft 6 1/2 in)
2019	USA Outdoor Track and Field Championships	Des Moines, Iowa	2nd	Triple jump	17.70 m (58 ft 3/4 in)
2019	USA Outdoor Track and Field Championships	Des Moines, Iowa	2nd	Long jump	8.06 m (26 ft 5 1/4 in)
2018	USA Indoor Track and Field Championships	Albuquerque Convention Center Albuquerque, New Mexico	1st	Triple jump	17.28 m (56 ft 8 1/4 in)
2017	USA Outdoor Track and Field Championships	Sacramento, California	1st	Triple jump	17.91 m (58 ft 9 in)
2016	USA Olympic Trials	Eugene, Oregon	3rd	Long jump	8.42 m (27 ft 7 1/4 in)
2016	USA Olympic Trials	Eugene, Oregon	1st	Triple jump	17.65 m (57 ft 10 3/4 in)
2015	USA Outdoor Track and Field Championships	Eugene, Oregon	2nd	Triple jump	17.48 m (57 ft 4 in)
2015	USA Indoor Track and Field Championships	Reggie Lewis Center Boston, MA	DNS	Triple jump	DNS
2014	USA Outdoor Track and Field Championships	Hornet Stadium (Sacramento) Sacramento, California	1st	Triple jump	17.75 m (58 ft 2 3/4 in)
2014	USA Indoor Track and Field Championships	Albuquerque Convention Center Albuquerque, New Mexico	5th	Long jump	7.83 m (25 ft 8 1/4 in)
2013	USA Outdoor Track and Field Championships	Drake Stadium, Des Moines, Iowa	7th	Long jump	8.05 m (26 ft 4 3/4 in)
2013	USA Outdoor Track and Field Championships	Drake Stadium, Des Moines, Iowa	2nd	Triple jump	17.04 m (55 ft 10 3/4 in)
2012	USA Track and Field Olympic Trials	Hayward Field Eugene, Oregon	2nd	Triple jump	17.55 m (57 ft 6 3/4 in)
2012	USA Track and Field Olympic Trials	Hayward Field Eugene, Oregon	2nd	Long jump	8.23 m (27 ft 0 in)
2012	USA Indoor Track and Field Championships	Albuquerque Convention Center Albuquerque, New Mexico	1st	Triple jump	17.63 m (57 ft 10 in)
2012	USA Indoor Track and Field Championships	Albuquerque Convention Center Albuquerque, New Mexico	1st	Long jump	8.02 m (26 ft 3 1/2 in)
2011	USA Outdoor Track and Field Championships	Hayward Field, Eugene, Oregon	2nd	Triple jump	17.09 m (56 ft 3/4 in)
2011	USA Outdoor Track and Field Championships	Hayward Field, Eugene, Oregon	2nd	Long jump	8.19 m (26 ft 10 1/4 in)
2009	USA Junior Outdoor Track and Field Championships	Hayward Field, Eugene, Oregon	2nd	Long jump	7.80 m (25 ft 7 in)
2009	USA Junior Outdoor Track and Field Championships	Hayward Field, Eugene, Oregon	1st	Triple jump	17.14 m (56 ft 2 3/4 in)
2008	USA Junior Outdoor Track and Field Championships	Jesse Owens Memorial Stadium, Columbus, Ohio	DNS	Triple jump	DNS
2008	USA Junior Outdoor Track and Field Championships	Jesse Owens Memorial Stadium, Columbus, Ohio	DNS	Long jump	DNS

== Personal bests ==
Event	Best (m)	Venue	Date
Triple jump (outdoor)	18.14	Long Beach, United States	June 29, 2019
Triple jump (indoor)	17.70	Istanbul, Turkey	March 11, 2012
Long jump (outdoor)	8.29	Athens, Georgia	May 14, 2011
Long jump (indoor)	8.24	Fayetteville, Arkansas	February 10, 2012

- All information taken from IAAF profile.

== See also ==
- Florida Gators
- List of Olympic medalists in athletics (men)
- List of University of Florida Olympians
