= Netherlands Antilles at the 2009 World Championships in Athletics =

- WA code: AHO

in Berlin, Germany 15–23 August 2009
- Competitors: 1
- Medals: Gold 0 Silver 0 Bronze 0 Total 0

World Championships in Athletics appearances (overview)
- 1983; 1987; 1991; 1993; 1995; 1997; 1999; 2001; 2003; 2005; 2007; 2009

Netherlands Antilles competed at the 2009 World Championships in Athletics in Berlin, Germany, which were held from 15 to 23 August 2009. The athlete delegation consisted of one athlete, sprinter Churandy Martina. Martina competed in the men's 100 metres, reaching the quarterfinals. He was also entered in the men's 200 metres but did not start in the event.

== Background ==
The 2009 World Championships in Athletics were held at the Olympiastadion in Berlin, Germany. Under the auspices of the International Amateur Athletic Federation, this was the twelfth edition of the World Championships. It was held from 15 to 23 August 2009 and had 47 different events. Among the competing nations was the constituent country of the Netherlands Antilles, which, by 2009, was composed of the territories of Bonaire, Curaçao, Saba, Sint Eustatius, and Sint Maarten. For this edition of the World Championships in Athletics, sprinter Churandy Martina was the sole participant for the Antilles. This was Martina's fourth consecutive appearance for the Netherlands Antilles at the World Championships. He had also placed fourth in the men's 100 metres at the 2008 Summer Olympics.

== Results ==
=== Men ===
Martina first competed in the heats of the men's 100 metres on 15 August. He competed in the eighth heat against seven other athletes. There, he recorded a time of 10.26 seconds, placing third, and qualified for the quarterfinals. At the quarterfinals held in the same day, he raced in the fifth round against seven other athletes. There, he recorded a time of 10.19 seconds, placing fourth, and did not qualify for the semifinals. He was also entered in the men's 200 metres but did not start in the event.

Track and road events

Athlete	Event	Heat		Quarterfinal		Semifinal		Final	
Athlete	Event	Result	Rank	Result	Rank	Result	Rank	Result	Rank
Churandy Martina	100 metres	10.26	3 Q	10.19	4	Did not advance			
Churandy Martina	200 metres	DNS		Did not advance					
