= Netherlands Antilles at the 1983 World Championships in Athletics =

- Flag of the Netherlands Antilles
- WA code: AHO

in Helsinki, Finland August 7–14, 1983
- Competitors: 2 (1 man and 1 woman) in 3 events
- Medals: Gold 0 Silver 0 Bronze 0 Total 0

World Championships in Athletics appearances (overview)
- 1983; 1987; 1991; 1993; 1995; 1997; 1999; 2001; 2003; 2005; 2007; 2009

The Netherlands Antilles competed at the 1983 World Championships in Athletics in Helsinki, Finland, which were held from 7 to 14 August 1983. The athlete delegation consisted of two athletes, middle-distance runner Ruthsel Martina and sprinter Evelyne Farrell. Martina competed in the qualifying heats of the men's 800 metres but failed to advance further. Farrell competed in the qualifying heats of the women's 100 metres and women's 200 metres, avancing to the quarterfinals of the latter. Her placements in both events remains as the Netherlands Antilles' best performance in the events at any edition of the World Championships.

== Background ==
The 1983 World Championships in Athletics were held at the Helsinki Olympic Stadium in Helsinki, Finland. Under the auspices of the International Amateur Athletics Federation, this was the first edition of the World Championships. It was held from 7 to 14 August 1983 and had 41 different events. Among the competing nations was the constituent country of the Netherlands Antilles, which, by 1983, was composed of the territories of Aruba, Bonaire, Curaçao, Saba, Sint Eustatius, and Sint Maarten. For this edition of the World Championships in Athletics, middle-distance runner Ruthsel Martina and sprinter Evelyne Farrell competed for the Antilles. They competed in the men's 800 metres and women's 100 metres, respectively.

== Results ==
=== Men ===
Martina competed in the qualifying heats of the men's 800 metres on 7 August 1983. He competed in the fifth heat against six other athletes. There, he recorded a time of 1:55.67, placing last in his heat, and did not advance to the quarterfinals the following day.

Track and road events

Athlete	Event	Heat		Semifinal		Final	
Athlete	Event	Result	Rank	Result	Rank	Result	Rank
Ruthsel Martina	800 metres	1:55.67	7	Did not advance			

=== Women ===
Farrell first competed in the qualifying heats of the women's 100 metres on 7 August. She competed in the sixth heat against six other athletes. There, he recorded a time of 12.19 seconds, placing fifth in his heat, and did not advance to the quarterfinals the following day. She then competed in the qualifying heats of the women's 200 metres on 12 August. She competed in the fourth heat against seven other athletes. There, she recorded a time of 25.52 seconds, placing seventh, and advanced to the quarterfinals. Though, at the quarterfinals in the third heat, she did not start. Her placements in the women's 100 metres and 200 metres remains as the Netherlands Antilles' best performance in the events at the World Championships.

Track and road events

Athlete	Event	Heat		Quarterfinal		Semifinal		Final	
Athlete	Event	Result	Rank	Result	Rank	Result	Rank	Result	Rank
Evelyn Farrell	100 metres	12.19	5	Did not advance					
Evelyn Farrell	200 metres	25.52	7 q	did not start		Did not advance			
