= Cuba at the 2022 World Athletics Championships =

- WA code: CUB
- National federation: Cuban Athletics Federation

in Eugene, United States 15–24 July 2022
- Competitors: 16 (6 men and 10 women) in 13 events
- Medals: Gold 0 Silver 0 Bronze 0 Total 0

World Athletics Championships appearances
- 1983; 1987; 1991; 1993; 1995; 1997; 1999; 2001; 2003; 2005; 2007; 2009; 2011; 2013; 2015; 2017; 2019; 2022; 2023; 2025

Cuba competed at the 2022 World Athletics Championships in Eugene, United States, from 15 to 24 July 2022. The Cuban Athletics Federation had initially entered 16 athletes, but ended up competing with 14 of them after the withdrawals of Yorgelis Rodríguez and Yiselena Ballar.

It was the first time that Cuba ended its participation in the World Athletics Championships without winning a medal. However, four Cuban athletes were among the top eight in their respective competitions, accumulating a total of 15 points that placed Cuba in 29th place in the overall placing table.

== Team ==
Initially, Cuba announced a team of 14 athletes qualified for the World Athletics Championships, which was later expanded to 16 athletes with Mario Díaz (discus throw) and Yiselena Ballar (javelin throw) being included. The Cuban team was reduced to 14 athletes after the withdrawals of Yorgelis Rodríguez (heptathlon) and the javelin thrower Yiselena Ballar, the first one due to an injury and Ballar after deserting from the Cuban team in Miami before traveling to Eugene, the host city.

== Results ==
Cuba entered 16 athletes.

Key

- Note: Ranks given for track events are within the athlete's heat only
- Q = Qualified for the next round
- q = Qualified for the next round as a fastest loser or, in field events, by position without achieving the qualifying target
- NR = National record
- PB = Personal best
- SB = Season best
- N/A = Round not applicable for the event

=== Men ===
Track events

Athlete	Event	Heat		Semi-final		Final	
Athlete	Event	Result	Rank	Result	Rank	Result	Rank
Shainer Rengifo	100 metres	10.21	6	Did not advance			
Shainer Rengifo	200 metres	20.80	6	Did not advance			

Field events

Athlete	Event	Qualification		Final	
Athlete	Event	Distance	Position	Distance	Position
Luis Enrique Zayas	High jump	2.28	5 q	2.27	=6
Maykel Massó	Long jump	7.93	12 q	8.15 SB	4
Andy Hechavarría	Triple jump	16.39	21	Did not advance	
Lázaro Martínez	Triple jump	17.06	5 Q	NM	
Mario Díaz	Discus throw	60.83	22	Did not advance	

=== Women ===
Track events

Athlete	Event	Heat		Semi-final		Final	
Athlete	Event	Result	Rank	Result	Rank	Result	Rank
Roxana Gómez	400 metres	51.85	3 Q	51.12	4	Did not advance	
Rose Mary Almanza	800 metres	2:01.96	4	Did not advance			
Greisys Roble	100 metres hurdles	13.24	4	Did not advance			

Field events

Athlete	Event	Qualification		Final	
Athlete	Event	Distance	Position	Distance	Position
Leyanis Pérez	Triple jump	14.30	11 q	14.70	4
Liadagmis Povea	Triple jump	14.01	17	Did not advance	
Davisleydi Velazco	Triple jump	13.94	19	Did not advance	
Silinda Morales	Discus throw	58.73	16	Did not advance	
Yaime Pérez	Discus throw	65.32 SB	3 Q	63.07	7
Yiselena Ballar	Javelin throw	Withdrew from the competition			

Combined events – Heptathlon

Athlete	Event	100H	HJ	SP	200 m	LJ	JT	800 m	Final	Rank
Yorgelis Rodríguez	Result	Withdrew from the competition								
Yorgelis Rodríguez	Points	Withdrew from the competition								
