= Cuba at the 2023 World Athletics Championships =

- Flag of Cuba
- WA code: CUB

in Budapest, Hungary 19 August 2023 – 27 August 2023
- Competitors: 21 (8 men and 13 women)
- Medals Ranked 25th: Gold 0 Silver 1 Bronze 2 Total 3

World Athletics Championships appearances
- 1983; 1987; 1991; 1993; 1995; 1997; 1999; 2001; 2003; 2005; 2007; 2009; 2011; 2013; 2015; 2017; 2019; 2022; 2023

Cuba competed at the 2023 World Athletics Championships in Budapest, Hungary, from 19 to 27 August 2023.

== Medalists ==
Medal	Athlete	Event	Date
Silver	Lázaro Martínez	Men's triple jump	August 21
Bronze	Cristian Nápoles	Men's triple jump	August 21
Bronze	Leyanis Pérez	Women's triple jump	August 25

== Results ==
Cuba entered 21 athletes.

Key

- Q = Qualified for the next round
- q = Qualified for the next round as a fastest loser or, in field events, by position without achieving the qualifying target
- NR = National record
- PB = Personal best
- SB = Season best
- N/A = Round not applicable for the event

=== Men ===
Field events

Athlete	Event	Qualification		Final	
Athlete	Event	Distance	Position	Distance	Position
Luis Zayas	High jump	2.28	12 q	2.33 =PB	4
Eduardo Nápoles	Pole vault	5.35	29	Did not advance	
Alejandro Parada	Long jump	8.13	5 q	7.86	10
Lázaro Martínez	Triple jump	17.12	3 q	17.41	2nd place, silver medalist(s)
Cristian Nápoles	Triple jump	16.95	5 q	17.40 PB	3rd place, bronze medalist(s)
Mario Díaz	Discus throw	58.03	33	Did not advance	
Yasmani Fernández	Hammer throw	Did not start			
Ronald Mencia Zayas	Hammer throw	71.72	26	Did not advance	

=== Women ===
Track and road events

Athlete	Event	Heat		Semifinal		Final	
Athlete	Event	Result	Rank	Result	Rank	Result	Rank
Yunisleidy García	100 metres	DQ		Did not advance			
Yunisleidy García	200 metres	23.22	6	Did not advance			
Roxana Gómez	400 metres	50.86	2 Q	51.07	3	Did not advance	
Rose Mary Almanza	800 metres	2:01.33	6	Did not advance			
Zurian Hechavarría	400 metres hurdles	56.43	6	Did not advance			
Yunisleidy García; Yarima García; Laura Moreira; Enis Pérez	4 × 100 metres relay	43.17 =SB	6	—		Did not advance	
Rose Mary Almanza; Roxana Gómez; Zurian Hechavarría; Lisneidy Veitía	4 × 400 metres relay	3:29.70	7	—		Did not advance	

Field events

Athlete	Event	Qualification		Final	
Athlete	Event	Distance	Position	Distance	Position
Leyanis Pérez	Triple jump	14.50	5 Q	14.96	3rd place, bronze medalist(s)
Liadagmis Povea	Triple jump	14.31	7 Q	14.87 SB	6
Silinda Oneisi Morales	Discus throw	62.76	9 q	62.31	11
