= Azerbaijan at the 2017 World Championships in Athletics =

- Flag of Azerbaijan
- WA code: AZE
- National federation: Azerbaijan Athletics Federation
- Website: af-aze.org

in London, United Kingdom 4–13 August 2017
- Competitors: 4 (3 men and 1 woman) in 3 events
- Medals: Gold 0 Silver 0 Bronze 0 Total 0

World Championships in Athletics appearances
- 1993; 1995; 1997; 1999; 2001; 2003; 2005; 2007; 2009; 2011; 2013; 2015; 2017; 2019; 2022; 2023; 2025

Azerbaijan competed at the 2017 World Championships in Athletics in London, United Kingdom, 4–13 August 2017.

== Results ==
=== Men ===
Track and road events

Athlete	Event	Heat		Semifinal		Final	
Athlete	Event	Result	Rank	Result	Rank	Result	Rank
Hayle Ibrahimov	5000 metres	13:32.15	26	—N/a		Did not advance	

Field events

Athlete	Event	Qualification		Final	
Athlete	Event	Distance	Position	Distance	Position
Nazim Babayev	Triple jump	16.61	14	Did not advance	
Alexis Copello	Triple jump	16.89	7 q	17.16 SB	5

=== Women ===
Field events

Athlete	Event	Qualification		Final	
Athlete	Event	Distance	Position	Distance	Position
Hanna Skydan	Hammer throw	71.78	7 Q	73.38	5
