= Kim Jang-woo =

South Korean triple jumper

Personal information
- Born: 20 August 1999 (age 27)

Sport
- Sport: Athletics
- Event: Triple jump

Achievements and titles
- Personal bests: Triple jump: 17.13m (2025) NR
Medal record
Men's athletics
Representing South Korea
Asian Championships
Bronze medal – third place	2023 Bangkok	Triple jump
Asian Indoor Championships
Silver medal – second place	2024 Tehran	Triple jump

Kim Jang-woo (born 20 August 1999) is a South Korean triple jumper. He is the South Korean national record holder at the event.

== Career ==
He won the bronze medal in the triple jump at the 2023 Asian Athletics Championships in Bangkok, Thailand, with a jump of 16.59 metres. He represented South Korea at the 2023 World Athletics Championships in Budapest, Hungary.

He won the silver medal in the triple jump at the 2024 Asian Indoor Athletics Championships in Tehran, Iran, with a jump of 16.37 metres. He competed at the 2024 Olympic Games in Paris, France, jumping 16.31 metres without advancing to the final.

He set a new personal best and South Korean national record of 17.13 metres whilst competing at the National Athletics Championships in Gangwon Province, South Korea, surpassing the previous record of 17.10 meters, set by Kim Deok-hyeon in 2009.
