= Wu Ruiting =

Chinese triple jumper

Personal information
- Born: 29 November 1995 (age 30)

Sport
- Sport: Athletics
- Event: Triple jump

Wu Ruiting (born 29 November 1995) is a Chinese athlete specialising in the triple jump. He represented his country at two consecutive World Championships, in 2017 and 2019, reaching the final on both occasions.

His personal bests in the event are 17.68 metres outdoors (+1.0 m/s, Quzhou 2025) and 16.94 metres indoors (Xianlin 2017).

== International competitions ==
Year	Competition	Venue	Position	Event	Notes
Representing China
2017	World Championships	London, United Kingdom	9th	Triple jump	16.66 m
2019	World Championships	Doha, Qatar	9th	Triple jump	16.97 m
2021	Olympic Games	Tokyo, Japan	14th (q)	Triple jump	16.73 m
2023	Asian Championships	Bangkok, Thailand	8th	Triple jump	15.93 m
2024	Asian Indoor Championships	Tehran, Iran	8th	Triple jump	15.54 m
2025	World Championships	Tokyo, Japan	14th (q)	Triple jump	16.74 m
