= Athletics at the 2023 Pan American Games – Men's triple jump =

Men's triple jump at the 2023 Pan American Games
- Venue: Julio Martínez National Stadium
- Dates: November 3
- Competitors: 9 from 7 nations
- Winning distance: 17.19

Medalists
Gold medal	Lázaro Martínez	Cuba
Silver medal	Almir dos Santos	Brazil
Bronze medal	Cristian Nápoles	Cuba

The men's triple jump competition of the athletics events at the 2023 Pan American Games took place on the 3 of November at the Julio Martínez National Stadium.

== Records ==
Prior to this competition, the existing world and Pan American Games records were as follows:

World record	Jonathan Edwards (GBR)	18.29	Gothenburg, Sweden	August 7, 1995
Pan American Games record	João Carlos de Oliveira (BRA)	17.89	Mexico City, Mexico	October 15, 1975

== Schedule ==
Date	Time	Round
November 3, 2023	19:29	Final

== Results ==
All marks shown are in meters.

KEY:	q	Fastest non-qualifiers	Q	Qualified	NR	National record	PB	Personal best	SB	Seasonal best	DQ	Disqualified

=== Final ===
The results were as follows:

Rank	Name	Nationality	#1	#2	#3	#4	#5	#6	Mark	Notes
1st place, gold medalist(s)	Lázaro Martínez	Cuba	17.19	x	–	–	–	–	17.19	
2nd place, silver medalist(s)	Almir dos Santos	Brazil	16.51	x	16.88	–	16.22	16.92	16.92	
3rd place, bronze medalist(s)	Cristian Nápoles	Cuba	16.66	x	16.00	16.44	x	x	16.66	
4	Christopher Benard	United States	x	16.21	16.48	x	16.15	x	16.48	
5	Luis Reyes	Chile	14.00	16.14	15.94	x	x	16.30	16.30	
6	Leodan Torrealba	Venezuela	14.16	16.14	16.20	15.93	x	16.04	16.20	
7	Chris Carter	United States	15.03	x	15.42	x	x	15.67	15.67	
8	Frixon Chila	Ecuador	15.42	x	x	x	x	x	15.42	
9	Brandon Jones	Belize	14.42	x	14.47				14.47	
