= Cuba at the 2013 World Championships in Athletics =

- WA code: CUB

in Moscow
- Competitors: 25
- Medals: Gold 0 Silver 0 Bronze 0 Total 0

World Championships in Athletics appearances
- 1983; 1987; 1991; 1993; 1995; 1997; 1999; 2001; 2003; 2005; 2007; 2009; 2011; 2013; 2015; 2017; 2019; 2022; 2023

Cuba is competing at the 2013 World Championships in Athletics in Moscow, Russia, from 10 to 18 August 2013. A team of 25 athletes was announced to represent the country in the event.

== Results ==
(q – qualified, NM – no mark, SB – season best)

=== Men ===
Track and road events

Athlete	Event	Preliminaries		Heats		Semifinals		Final	
Athlete	Event	Time	Rank	Time	Rank	Time	Rank	Time	Rank
Yoandys Lescay	400 metres								
Andy González	800 metres								
Ignacio Morales	110 metres hurdle								
Orlando Ortega	110 metres hurdle								
Omar Cisneros	400 metres hurdles								
Raidel Acea; Omar Cisneros; Yoandys Lescay; Osmaidel Pellicier; Orestes Rodriguez; Noel Ruiz	4 × 400 metres relay								

Field events

Athlete	Event	Preliminaries		Final	
Athlete	Event	Width Height	Rank	Width Height	Rank
Pedro Pablo Pichardo	Triple jump				
Ernesto Reve	Triple jump				
Lázaro Borges	Pole vault				
Jorge Y. Fernandez	Discus throw				
Guillermo Martinez	Javelin throw				
Roberto Janet	Hammer throw				

Decathlon

Leonel Suárez	Decathlon			
Leonel Suárez	Event	Results	Points	Rank
	100 m			
	Long jump			
	Shot put			
	High jump			
	400 m			
	110 m hurdles			
	Discus throw			
	Pole vault			
	Javelin throw			
	1500 m			
Total				

=== Women ===
Track and road events

Athlete	Event	Preliminaries		Heats		Semifinals		Final	
Athlete	Event	Time	Rank	Time	Rank	Time	Rank	Time	Rank
Rose Mary Almanza	800 metres								

Field events

Athlete	Event	Preliminaries		Final	
Athlete	Event	Width Height	Rank	Width Height	Rank
Mabel Gay	Triple jump				
Yarisley Silva	Pole vault				
Yaniuvis López	Shot put				
Yarelys Barrios	Discus throw				
Denia Caballero	Discus throw				
Yaime Pérez	Discus throw				
Yipsi Moreno	Hammer throw				

Heptathlon

Yorgelis Rodriguez	Heptathlon			
Yorgelis Rodriguez	Event	Results	Points	Rank
	100 m hurdles			
	High jump			
	Shot put			
	200 m			
	Long jump			
	Javelin throw			
	800 m			
Total				
