= Azerbaijan at the 2009 World Championships in Athletics =

- WA code: AZE

in Berlin
- Competitors: 1
- Medals: Gold 0 Silver 0 Bronze 0 Total 0

World Championships in Athletics appearances
- 1993; 1995; 1997; 1999; 2001; 2003; 2005; 2007; 2009; 2011; 2013; 2015; 2017; 2019; 2022; 2023

Azerbaijan fielded one competitor at the 2009 World Championships in Athletics in Berlin.

== Team selection ==
Track and road events

Event	Athletes	
Event	Men	Women
200 metres	Ramil Guliyev	

== Results ==
=== Men ===
Event	Athletes	Heats		Quarterfinals		Semifinal		Final	
Event	Athletes	Result	Rank	Result	Rank	Result	Rank	Result	Rank
200 m	Ramil Guliyev	21.12	37	20.40	4	20.28	4	20.61	7
