= Charles Clark (sprinter) =

American sprinter

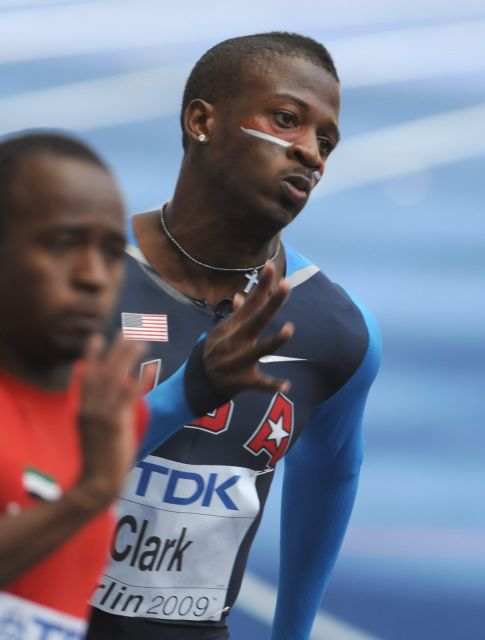

Personal information
- Nickname: Superman
- Nationality: United States
- Born: August 10, 1987 (age 38) Virginia Beach, Virginia
- Height: 5 ft 10 in (178 cm)
- Weight: 163 lb (74 kg)

Sport
- Sport: Running
- College team: Florida State Seminoles

Achievements and titles
- Personal bests: 100m: 10.47 200m: 20.22 400m: 45.30

Charles Clark (born August 10, 1987) is an American sprinter, who specializes in the 200 metres. His personal best time is 20.22 seconds, but he also ran a 20.00 at the 2009 USA Outdoor Championships, for 2nd place, qualifying him for the World Championships to be held in Berlin, Germany, where he finished 6th in the final of the 200m.

Clark was voted an All-USA boys high school track selection by USA Today.

He attended Florida State University.
