= Azerbaijan at the 2022 World Athletics Championships =

- Flag of Azerbaijan
- WA code: AZE
- National federation: Austrian Athletics Federation

in Eugene, United States 15–24 July 2022
- Competitors: 2 (2 women)

World Athletics Championships appearances
- 1993; 1995; 1997; 1999; 2001; 2003; 2005; 2007; 2009; 2011; 2013; 2015; 2017; 2019; 2022; 2023

Azerbaijan competed at the 2022 World Athletics Championships in Eugene, United States, from 15 to 24 July 2022. It entered 2 athletes.

== Entrants ==
Field events

Athlete	Event	Qualification		Final	
Athlete	Event	Distance	Position	Distance	Position
Yekaterina Sariyeva	Women's triple jump	13.46	26	Did not qualify	
Hanna Skydan	Women's hammer throw	70.93	11 q	69.01	11
