= Cristian Nápoles =

Cuban triple jumper (born 1998)

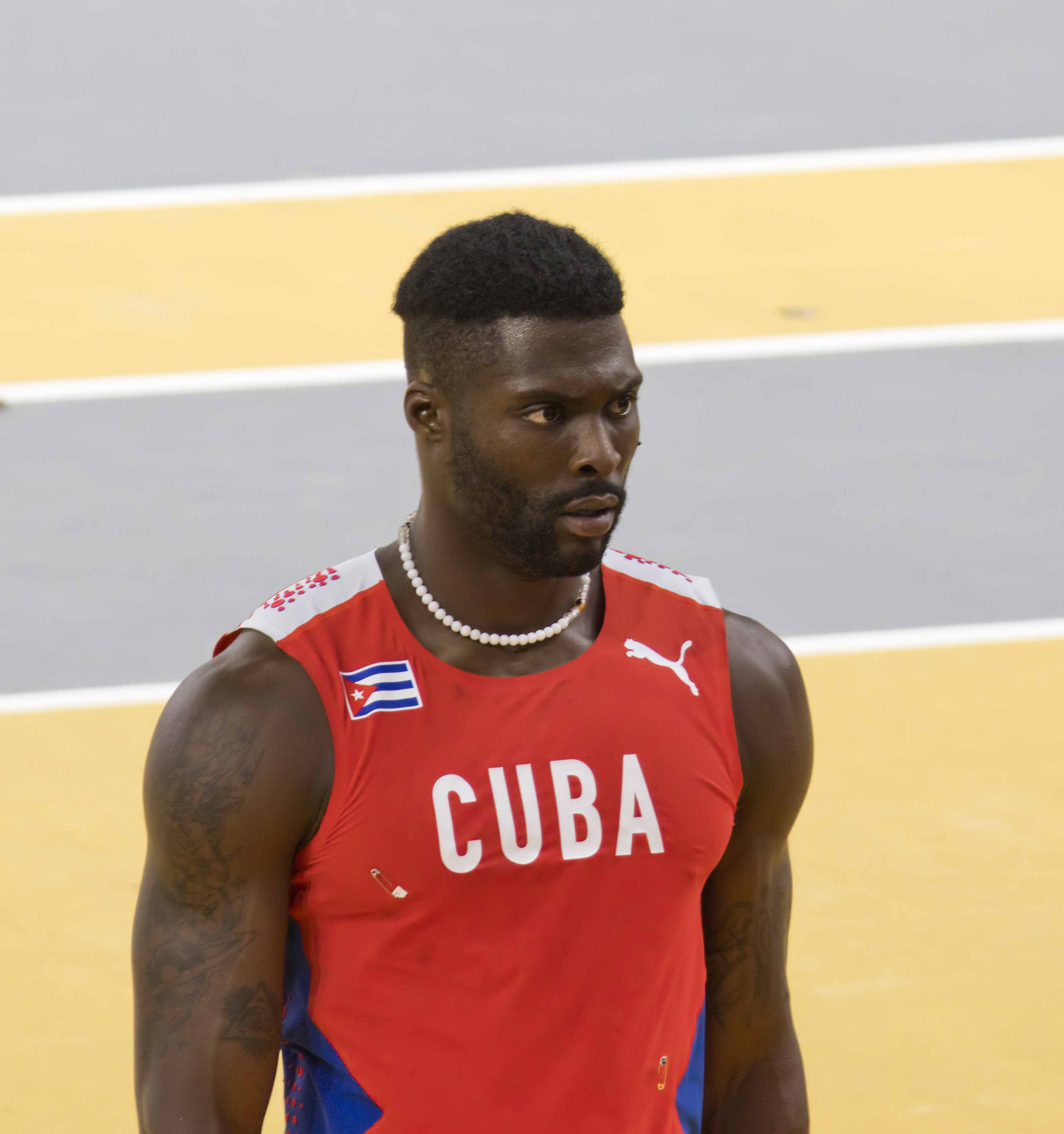
- Nápoles in 2023

Personal information
- Born: 27 November 1998 (age 27) Marianao, Cuba
- Height: 1.81 m (5 ft 11 in)
- Weight: 80 kg (176 lb)

Sport
- Sport: Athletics
- Event: Triple jump
Medal record
Men's athletics
Representing Cuba
World Championships
Bronze medal – third place	2023 Budapest	Triple jump
Pan American Games
Bronze medal – third place	2023 Santiago	Triple jump

Cristian Atanay Nápoles (born 27 November 1998, in Marianao) is a Cuban athlete specialising in the triple jump. He won the bronze medal at the 2023 World Championships in the triple jump event. Nápoles also represented his country at the 2017 World Championships finishing fourth and only missing the bronze by four centimetres. Additionally, he won the silver medal at the 2016 World U20 Championships and the gold at the 2015 World Youth Championships. He competed at the 2020 Summer Olympics.

His personal best in the event is 17.38 metres (+0.8 m/s) set in Doha in 2019.

== International competitions ==
Year	Competition	Venue	Position	Event	Notes
Representing Cuba
2015	World Youth Championships	Cali, Colombia	1st	Triple jump	16.13 m
2016	World U20 Championships	Bydgoszcz, Poland	2nd	Triple jump	16.62 m
2017	World Championships	London, United Kingdom	4th	Triple jump	17.16 m
2018	World Indoor Championships	Birmingham, United Kingdom	9th	Triple jump	16.70 m
2018	Central American and Caribbean Games	Barranquilla, Colombia	1st	Triple jump	17.34 m
2018	Ibero-American Championships	Trujillo, Peru	1st	Triple jump	16.81 m
2019	World Championships	Doha, Qatar	5th	Triple jump	17.38 m
2021	Olympic Games	Tokyo, Japan	10th	Triple jump	16.63 m
2023	ALBA Games	Caracas, Venezuela	1st	Triple jump	17.23 m
2023	Central American and Caribbean Games	San Salvador, El Salvador	2nd	Triple jump	17.11 m
2023	World Championships	Budapest, Hungary	3rd	Triple jump	17.40 m
2023	Pan American Games	Santiago, Chile	3rd	Triple jump	16.66 m
2024	World Indoor Championships	Glasgow, United Kingdom	13th	Triple jump	15.98 m
2024	Olympic Games	Paris, France	18th (q)	Triple jump	16.67 m
2025	World Championships	Tokyo, Japan	27th (q)	Triple jump	16.21 m
