= 2011 World Youth Championships in Athletics – Boys' triple jump =

Boys' triple jump at the 2011 World Youth Championships in Athletics
- Venue: Stadium Lille Métropole
- Dates: 8 July (qualification); 9 July (final)
- Competitors: 33
- Winning distance: 16.06

Medalists
gold medal	Latario Collie-Minns	Bahamas
silver medal	Albert Janki	South Africa
bronze medal	Lathone Collie-Minns	Bahamas

The boys' triple jump at the 2011 World Youth Championships in Athletics was held at the Stadium Lille Métropole on 8 and 9 July.

== Medalists ==
Gold	Silver	Bronze
Latario Collie-Minns; Bahamas	Albert Janki; South Africa	Lathone Collie-Minns; Bahamas

== Records ==
Prior to the competition, the records were as follows.

World Youth Best	Gu Junjie (CHN)	16.89	Guangzhou, China	25 August 2000
Championship Record	Héctor Dairo Fuentes (CUB)	16.63	Marrakesh, Morocco	16 July 2005
World Youth Leading	Latario Collie-Minns (BAH)	16.55	Nassau, The Bahamas	26 March 2011

== Qualification ==
Qualification rule: qualification standard 15.25 m or at least best 12 qualified.

=== Group A ===
Rank	Name	Nationality	#1	#2	#3	Result	Notes
1	Lathone Collie-Minns	Bahamas	15.03	15.07	15.16	15.16	q
2	Talal Salem	Kuwait	15.10	x	14.67	15.10	q, PB
3	Albert Janki	South Africa	14.47	x	15.09	15.09	q
4	Lasha Gulelauri	Georgia	14.85	x	15.08	15.08	q
5	Lin Qing	China	14.90	14.93	14.97	14.97	
6	Cristi Boboc	Romania	14.30	14.67	14.96	14.96	
7	Aleksey Mashentsev	Kazakhstan	14.64	x	14.86	14.86	
8	Yodenys Rivera	Cuba	x	x	14.80	14.80	
9	Brandon Munganga	France	14.28	14.32	14.72	14.72	
10	Imani Brown	United States	x	14.20	14.69	14.69	
11	Musa Tüzen	Turkey	14.60	14.37	x	14.60	
12	Ihab El-Hajri	Morocco	14.21	14.47	14.55	14.55	
13	Sandeep Suhaag	India	x	14.14	x	14.14	
14	Izmail Khudaybergenov	Uzbekistan	14.03	14.06	13.79	14.06	
15	Albert Raga	Spain	14.02	13.37	x	14.02	
16	Bienvenu Sawadogo	Burkina Faso	13.50	14.00	13.94	14.00	

=== Group B ===
Rank	Name	Nationality	#1	#2	#3	Result	Notes
1	Latario Collie-Minns	Bahamas	15.61			15.61	Q
2	Sabelo Ndlovu	South Africa	14.91	15.51		15.51	Q, PB
3	Maksim Lustin	Russia	15.31			15.31	Q
4	Levon Aghasyan	Armenia	15.09	15.13	15.22	15.22	q
5	Tomáš Veszelka	Slovakia	15.12	15.22	14.95	15.22	q, PB
6	Jean-Noël Crétinoir	France	15.20	15.08	15.05	15.20	q
7	Vladimir Pototskiy	Kazakhstan	14.86	15.06	14.30	15.06	q, PB
8	Theodoros Zintzovas	Greece	15.02	x	x	15.02	q
9	Gabriele Parisi	Italy	14.45	14.87	14.27	14.87	
10	Juan Mosquera	Panama	14.68	x	x	14.68	
11	Jaelen Spencer	United States	x	14.42	14.11	14.42	
12	Saqer Al-Saqer	Kuwait	x	x	14.20	14.20	
13	Deme Dekeba	Ethiopia	14.10	14.11	x	14.11	
14	Teymur Asadov	Azerbaijan	13.90	14.10	13.85	14.10	
15	Tatenda Clive	Zimbabwe	x	13.92	13.90	13.92	
16	David Spiridon	Romania	x	13.90	x	13.90	
17	Nicholas Fyffe	Canada	13.70	x	x	13.70	

== Final ==
Rank	Name	Nationality	#1	#2	#3	#4	#5	#6	Result	Notes
1st place, gold medalist(s)	Latario Collie-Minns	Bahamas	16.06	–	–	x	–	x	16.06	
2nd place, silver medalist(s)	Albert Janki	South Africa	14.88	x	15.34	15.14	15.21	15.95	15.95	
3rd place, bronze medalist(s)	Lathone Collie-Minns	Bahamas	15.12	15.51	–	x	–	15.43	15.51	
4	Maksim Lustin	Russia	14.82	15.21	x	15.06	15.45	15.02	15.45	
5	Jean-Noël Crétinoir	France	15.37	14.10	15.39	15.18	14.99	15.26	15.39	
6	Levon Aghasyan	Armenia	13.06	15.24	x	15.09	14.97	14.55	15.24	
7	Vladimir Pototskiy	Kazakhstan	x	15.08	15.06	15.24	x	13.40	15.24	
8	Lasha Gulelauri	Georgia	x	15.04	x	x	–	–	15.04	
9	Tomáš Veszelka	Slovakia	x	14.98	14.93				14.98	
10	Theodoros Zintzovas	Greece	14.94	13.58	14.72				14.94	
11	Sabelo Ndlovu	South Africa	14.68	14.91	13.55				14.91	
	Talal Salem	Kuwait	x	x	x				NM	
