= 2011 World Youth Championships in Athletics – Boys' long jump =

Boys' long jump at the 2011 World Youth Championships in Athletics
- Venue: Stadium Lille Métropole
- Dates: 6 July (qualification); 7 July (final)
- Competitors: 33
- Winning distance: 7.83 PB

Medalists
gold medal	Lin Qing	China
silver medal	Johan Taléus	Sweden
bronze medal	Stefano Braga	Italy

The boys' long jump at the 2011 World Youth Championships in Athletics was held at the Stadium Lille Métropole on 6 and 7 July.

== Medalists ==
Gold	Silver	Bronze
Lin Qing; China	Johan Taléus; Sweden	Stefano Braga; Italy

== Records ==
Prior to the competition, the following records were as follows.

World Youth Best	Luis Bueno (CUB)	8.25	Havana, Cuba	28 September 1986
Championship Record	Chris Noffke (AUS)	7.95	Marrakesh, Morocco	15 July 2005
World Youth Leading	Vadym Adamchuk (UKR)	7.95	Yalta, Ukraine	18 May 2011

== Qualification ==
Qualification rule: qualification standard 7.35 m or at least best 12 qualified.

=== Group A ===
Rank	Name	Nationality	#1	#2	#3	Result	Notes
1	Clive Pullen	Jamaica	7.29	x	7.01	7.29	q, PB
2	Stefano Braga	Italy	7.09	7.27	7.05	7.27	q
3	Duwayne Boer	South Africa	6.79	7.20	6.98	7.20	q
4	Huang Yanxuan	China	7.19	x	–	7.19	
5	Cameron Burrell	United States	x	7.11	x	7.11	
6	Yodenys Rivera	Cuba	6.72	6.68	7.06	7.06	
7	Fernando Ramos	Spain	7.03	6.97	x	7.03	
8	Álvaro Cortez	Chile	3.16	x	7.01	7.01	
9	Rinat Kaysarov	Kazakhstan	x	x	6.98	6.98	
10	David Göttlinger	Austria	6.58	6.56	6.83	6.83	
11	Charles Greaves	Barbados	6.69	6.68	6.77	6.77	
12	Ikki Fukunaga	Japan	6.72	6.42	6.17	6.72	
13	Armand Bam	South Africa	6.63	x	4.75	6.63	
14	Babajide Okulaja	Nigeria	6.30	6.55	6.52	6.55	
	Higor Alves	Brazil	x	x	x	NM	
	Lasha Gulelauri	Georgia				DNS	

=== Group B ===
Rank	Name	Nationality	#1	#2	#3	Result	Notes
1	Sergio Acera	Spain	7.14	7.29	7.49	7.49	Q
2	Lin Qing	China	7.49			7.49	Q
3	Semyon Popov	Russia	7.24	7.43		7.43	Q
4	Riccardo Pagan	Italy	x	x	7.39	7.39	Q
5	Stephan Hartmann	Germany	7.33	x	7.24	7.33	q
6	Johan Taléus	Sweden	7.19	7.26	x	7.26	q, PB
7	Ionuț Grecu	Romania	6.92	7.05	7.21	7.21	q
8	Juan Mosquera	Panama	6.63	7.21	6.82	7.21	q, PB
9	Simon Karlén	Sweden	x	6.98	7.19	7.19	q
10	Douglas Selestrino	Brazil	7.10	x	7.18	7.18	
11	Brendon Barnett	New Zealand	7.04	6.94	6.97	7.04	
12	Christopher Idoghor	Nigeria	7.03	6.91	x	7.03	
13	Asahi Iida	Japan	6.95	6.95	6.81	6.95	SB
14	Bartłomiej Draszawka	Poland	6.84	6.86	–	6.86	
15	Anburaja Pazhanivel	India	6.32	6.80	6.81	6.81	
16	Jean Noël Crétinoir	France	6.80	x	6.80	6.80	
17	Mitch O'Donnell	Canada	x	6.54	x	6.54	

== Final ==
Rank	Name	Nationality	#1	#2	#3	#4	#5	#6	Result	Notes
1st place, gold medalist(s)	Lin Qing	China	7.16	7.83	7.78	7.48	–	7.59	7.83	PB
2nd place, silver medalist(s)	Johan Taléus	Sweden	7.36	7.44	7.29	7.32	7.28	7.15	7.44	
3rd place, bronze medalist(s)	Stefano Braga	Italy	7.18	7.42	6.64	7.30	7.37	7.00	7.42	
4	Semyon Popov	Russia	7.20	7.39	7.34	7.12	7.26	x	7.39	
5	Simon Karlén	Sweden	7.29	7.19	7.34	x	7.13	7.29	7.34	SB
6	Juan Mosquera	Panama	7.28	7.34	7.18	x	x	7.19	7.34	PB
7	Stephan Hartmann	Germany	x	7.32	7.27	7.18	7.15	x	7.32	
8	Sergio Acera	Spain	7.18	7.22	x	–	–	–	7.22	
9	Clive Pullen	Jamaica	7.19	7.05	7.19				7.19	
10	Duwayne Boer	South Africa	7.13	7.09	6.88				7.13	
11	Ionuț Grecu	Romania	7.05	6.99	7.06				7.06	
12	Riccardo Pagan	Italy	3.59	–	–				3.59	
