= 2012 World Junior Championships in Athletics – Men's triple jump =

The men's triple jump at the 2012 World Junior Championships in Athletics will be held at the Estadi Olímpic Lluís Companys on 13 and 15 July.

== Medalists ==
Gold	Silver	Bronze
Pedro Pichardo; Cuba	Artem Primak; Russia	Latario Collie-Minns; Bahamas

== Records ==
Prior to the competition, the existing world junior and championship records were as follows.

World Junior Record	Volker Mai (GDR)	17.50 m	Erfurt, East Germany	23 June 1985
Championship Record	Yoelbi Quesada (CUB)	17.04 m	Seoul, South Korea	19 September 1992
World Junior Leading	Artem Primak (RUS)	16.76 m	Cheboksary, Russia	20 June 2012
Broken records during the 2012 World Junior Championships in Athletics
World Junior Leading	Pedro Pichardo (CUB)	16.79	Barcelona, Spain	15 July 2012

== Results ==
=== Qualification ===
Qualification: Standard 15.90 m (Q) or at least best 12 qualified (q)

Rank	Group	Name	Nationality	#1	#2	#3	Result	Note
1	A	Pedro Pichardo	Cuba	16.64			16.64	Q
2	A	Latario Collie-Minns	Bahamas	15.69	16.51		16.51	Q
3	B	Artem Primak	Russia	16.47			16.47	Q
4	B	Haitao Fu	China	16.07			16.07	Q
5	B	Daniel Pacheco	Spain	X	15.83	16.00	16.00	Q
6	A	Georgi Tsonov	Bulgaria	X	15.76	15.97	15.97	Q
7	B	Simon Karlén	Sweden	15.21	15.95		15.95	Q, PB
8	B	Clive Pullen	Jamaica	15.92			15.92	Q, PB
9	B	Kauam Bento	Brazil	15.56	15.91		15.91	Q
10	A	Henrique da Silva	Brazil	15.81	15.68	15.80	15.81	q, PB
11	B	Nikólaos Tsiókos	Greece	15.79	15.14	X	15.79	q
12	A	Lasha Gulelauri	Georgia	15.22	15.75	15.22	15.75	q
13	A	Isaac Kirwa Yego	Kenya	15.72	X	X	15.72	
14	A	Pratchaya Tepparak	Thailand	X	15.57		15.57	
15	A	Emmanouíl Makrís	Greece	15.55	15.22	15.20	15.55	
16	B	Cheikh Abba Badji	Senegal	15.01	14.66	15.48	15.48	
17	A	Ruslan Kurbanov	Uzbekistan	X	15.43	15.47	15.47	
18	A	Felix Obi	United States	14.96	15.45	13.65	15.45	
19	B	Martin Koch	Slovakia	X	X	15.31	15.31	
20	B	Talal Salem	Kuwait	14.94	14.98	15.30	15.30	
21	A	Hiroaki Yonezawa	Japan	14.71	14.96	15.23	15.23	
22	B	Rajasekar Raja	India	15.19	14.99	14.84	15.19	SB
23	B	Jarrion Lawson	United States	14.22	15.11	15.18	15.18	
24	A	Steve Waithe	Trinidad and Tobago	15.12	14.96	14.91	15.12	
25	A	Ihab El Hajri	Morocco	14.70	15.12	14.80	15.12	
26	A	Goabaone Mosheleketi	Botswana	X	X	15.10	15.10	
27	B	Vladimir Pototskiy	Kazakhstan	X	14.96	14.97	14.97	
28	B	Lathone Collie-Minns	Bahamas	X	X	13.30	13.30	
–	B	Levon Aghasyan	Armenia	X	X	X	NM	

=== Final ===
Rank	Name	Nationality	#1	#2	#3	#4	#5	#6	Result	Note
1st place, gold medalist(s)	Pedro Pichardo	Cuba	X	16.62	16.79	–	X	–	16.79	WJL
2nd place, silver medalist(s)	Artem Primak	Russia	16.43	16.20	X	16.41	16.60	16.34	16.60	
3rd place, bronze medalist(s)	Latario Collie-Minns	Bahamas	15.98	16.37	16.28	14.26	X	16.04	16.37	
4	Georgi Tsonov	Bulgaria	X	X	16.01	X	15.69	16.10	16.10	
5	Henrique da Silva	Brazil	16.04	X	X	X	15.80	15.53	16.04	PB
6	Lasha Gulelauri	Georgia	15.39	16.00	15.70	X	X	15.08	16.00	
7	Haitao Fu	China	15.93	X	15.65	–	X	–	15.93	
8	Nikólaos Tsiókos	Greece	15.91	15.38	14.78	X	15.66	X	15.91	
9	Clive Pullen	Jamaica	15.03	15.41	15.79				15.79	
10	Daniel Pacheco	Spain	X	15.75	X				15.75	
11	Simon Karlén	Sweden	15.22	14.27	15.27				15.27	
12	Kauam Bento	Brazil	X	X	14.58				14.58	

== Participation ==
According to an unofficial count, 29 athletes from 25 countries participated in the event.

- Armenia (1)
- Bahamas (2)
- Botswana (1)
- Brazil (2)
- Bulgaria (1)
- China (1)
- Cuba (1)
- Georgia (1)
- Greece (2)
- India (1)
- Jamaica (1)
- Japan (1)
- Kazakhstan (1)
- Kenya (1)
- Kuwait (1)
- Morocco (1)
- Russia (1)
- Senegal (1)
- Slovakia (1)
- Spain (1)
- Sweden (1)
- Thailand (1)
- Trinidad and Tobago (1)
- United States (2)
- Uzbekistan (1)
