= 2010 World Junior Championships in Athletics – Men's triple jump =

The men's triple jump event at the 2010 World Junior Championships in Athletics was held in Moncton, New Brunswick, Canada, at Moncton Stadium on 24 and 25 July.

== Medalists ==
Gold	Aleksey Fyodorov; Russia
Silver	Ernesto Revé; Cuba
Bronze	Omar Craddock; United States

== Results ==
=== Final ===
25 July

Rank	Name	Nationality	Attempts						Result	Notes
Rank	Name	Nationality	1	2	3	4	5	6	Result	Notes
1st place, gold medalist(s)	Aleksey Fyodorov	Russia	16.52 (w: -3.5 m/s)	16.68 (w: -0.5 m/s)	16.20 (w: -5.3 m/s)	x	16.59 (w: -1.0 m/s)	16.44 (w: -2.8 m/s)	16.68 (w: -0.5 m/s)	
2nd place, silver medalist(s)	Ernesto Revé	Cuba	15.98 (w: -4.6 m/s)	16.47 (w: -1.7 m/s)	x	x	16.29 (w: -2.2 m/s)	14.62 (w: -1.5 m/s)	16.47 (w: -1.7 m/s)	
3rd place, bronze medalist(s)	Omar Craddock	United States	16.15 (w: -1.4 m/s)	16.09 (w: -0.9 m/s)	16.00 (w: -2.9 m/s)	16.19 (w: -0.8 m/s)	16.01 (w: -0.7 m/s)	16.23 (w: -3.6 m/s)	16.23 (w: -3.6 m/s)	
4	Alexandru Baciu	Romania	x	15.90 (w: -0.4 m/s)	16.18 (w: -0.9 m/s)	16.11 (w: -1.2 m/s)	15.89 (w: -2.8 m/s)	15.57 (w: -1.9 m/s)	16.18 (w: -0.9 m/s)	
5	Andrea Chiari	Italy	x	x	15.61 (w: -2.2 m/s)	x	16.13 (w: +0.1 m/s)	15.90 (w: -1.9 m/s)	16.13 (w: +0.1 m/s)	
6	Yuriy Kovalev	Russia	15.90 (w: -1.8 m/s)	x	15.89 (w: -0.2 m/s)	15.70 (w: -1.2 m/s)	15.30 (w: -2.2 m/s)	15.96 (w: -1.1 m/s)	15.96 (w: -1.1 m/s)	
7	Xia Zhongwei	China	14.94 (w: -2.9 m/s)	15.86 (w: -1.0 m/s)	15.96 (w: -1.4 m/s)	x	x	x	15.96 (w: -1.4 m/s)	
8	Marquis Dendy	United States	x	15.53 (w: -2.4 m/s)	15.45 (w: -0.8 m/s)	15.17 (w: -2.1 m/s)	x	15.45 (w: -4.0 m/s)	15.53 (w: -2.4 m/s)	
9	José Adrian Sornoza	Ecuador	15.48 (w: -2.6 m/s)	x	14.42 (w: -1.9 m/s)				15.48 (w: -2.6 m/s)	
10	Gaetan Saku Bafuanga	France	15.37 (w: -2.2 m/s)	14.84 (w: -3.3 m/s)	15.44 (w: 0.0 m/s)				15.44 (w: 0.0 m/s)	
11	Ben Williams	United Kingdom	15.42 (w: -2.5 m/s)	x	14.68 (w: -0.8 m/s)				15.42 (w: -2.5 m/s)	
	Kola Adedoyin	United Kingdom	x	x	x				NM	

=== Qualifications ===
24 July

==== Group A ====
Rank	Name	Nationality	Attempts			Result	Notes
Rank	Name	Nationality	1	2	3	Result	Notes
1	Ernesto Revé	Cuba	16.25 (w: -3.0 m/s)	-	-	16.25 (w: -3.0 m/s)	Q
2	Alexandru Baciu	Romania	16.11 (w: -2.5 m/s)	-	-	16.11 (w: -2.5 m/s)	Q
3	Kola Adedoyin	United Kingdom	x	x	15.85 (w: -1.1 m/s)	15.85 (w: -1.1 m/s)	q
4	Xia Zhongwei	China	x	15.81 (w: -1.4 m/s)	15.71 (w: -1.1 m/s)	15.81 (w: -1.4 m/s)	q
5	Yuriy Kovalev	Russia	15.80 (w: -2.4 m/s)	x	15.66 (w: -2.3 m/s)	15.80 (w: -2.4 m/s)	q
6	Marquis Dendy	United States	x	15.31 (w: -1.7 m/s)	15.69 (w: -1.3 m/s)	15.69 (w: -1.3 m/s)	q
7	Yender Cardona	Venezuela	14.73 (w: -2.5 m/s)	x	15.41 (w: +0.6 m/s)	15.41 (w: +0.6 m/s)	
8	Lathario Collie-Minns	Bahamas	13.41 (w: -2.1 m/s)	15.35 (w: -1.1 m/s)	x	15.35 (w: -1.1 m/s)	
9	Arpinder Singh	India	14.93 (w: -1.4 m/s)	14.76 (w: -2.0 m/s)	15.31 (w: -0.5 m/s)	15.31 (w: -0.5 m/s)	
10	Kevin Luron	France	x	x	15.14 (w: -1.4 m/s)	15.14 (w: -1.4 m/s)	
11	Jonathan Henrique Silva	Brazil	15.07 (w: -1.6 m/s)	x	14.25 (w: -2.5 m/s)	15.07 (w: -1.6 m/s)	
12	Murad Ibadullayev	Azerbaijan	14.74 (w: -2.2 m/s)	x	14.48 (w: -1.7 m/s)	14.74 (w: -2.2 m/s)	
13	Marvin Muschette	Canada	14.52 (w: -1.1 m/s)	14.43 (w: -0.8 m/s)	14.46 (w: -1.1 m/s)	14.52 (w: -1.1 m/s)	

==== Group B ====
Rank	Name	Nationality	Attempts			Result	Notes
Rank	Name	Nationality	1	2	3	Result	Notes
1	Aleksey Fyodorov	Russia	16.47 (w: +1.5 m/s)	-	-	16.47 (w: +1.5 m/s)	Q
2	Andrea Chiari	Italy	16.16 (w: -1.4 m/s)	-	-	16.16 (w: -1.4 m/s)	Q
3	Omar Craddock	United States	x	16.11 (w: -0.2 m/s)	-	16.11 (w: -0.2 m/s)	Q
4	Gaetan Saku Bafuanga	France	14.84 (w: -1.3 m/s)	16.08 (w: -0.6 m/s)	-	16.08 (w: -0.6 m/s)	Q
5	José Adrian Sornoza	Ecuador	x	15.62 (w: -1.4 m/s)	15.55 (w: -1.6 m/s)	15.62 (w: -1.4 m/s)	q
6	Ben Williams	United Kingdom	x	15.50 (w: -0.7 m/s)	x	15.50 (w: -0.7 m/s)	q
7	Elton Walcott	Trinidad and Tobago	15.48 (w: -1.6 m/s)	15.13 (w: -0.9 m/s)	15.17 (w: -0.6 m/s)	15.48 (w: -1.6 m/s)	
8	Jarupat Poungmai	Thailand	14.69 (w: -2.5 m/s)	15.38 (w: -0.7 m/s)	15.46 (w: -0.2 m/s)	15.46 (w: -0.2 m/s)	
9	Alberto Álvarez	Mexico	14.23 (w: -2.6 m/s)	14.98 (w: -1.0 m/s)	15.24 (w: -0.2 m/s)	15.24 (w: -0.2 m/s)	
10	Newton Kipngeno	Kenya	15.10 (w: -1.1 m/s)	x	x	15.10 (w: -1.1 m/s)	
11	Vicente Docavo	Spain	x	15.07 (w: -1.4 m/s)	x	15.07 (w: -1.4 m/s)	
12	Panagiotis Volou	Cyprus	14.83 (w: -1.7 m/s)	x	15.01 (w: -0.5 m/s)	15.01 (w: -0.5 m/s)	
13	Vahid Sedig	Iran	13.77 (w: -2.7 m/s)	14.62 (w: -0.8 m/s)	14.92 (w: -1.2 m/s)	14.92 (w: -1.2 m/s)	

== Participation ==
According to an unofficial count, 26 athletes from 22 countries participated in the event.

- Azerbaijan (1)
- Bahamas (1)
- Brazil (1)
- Canada (1)
- China (1)
- Cuba (1)
- Cyprus (1)
- Ecuador (1)
- France (2)
- India (1)
- Iran (1)
- Italy (1)
- Kenya (1)
- Mexico (1)
- Romania (1)
- Russia (2)
- Spain (1)
- Thailand (1)
- Trinidad and Tobago (1)
- United Kingdom (2)
- United States (2)
- Venezuela (1)
