= 2013 European Athletics U23 Championships – Men's triple jump =

Men's athletic championship

The Men's triple jump event at the 2013 European Athletics U23 Championships was held in Tampere, Finland, at Ratina Stadium on 13 and 14 July.

== Medalists ==
Gold	Aleksey Fyodorov; Russia
Silver	Gaëtan Saku Bafuanga; France
Bronze	Artem Primak; Russia

== Results ==
=== Final ===
14 July 2013

Rank	Name	Nationality	Attempts						Result	Notes
Rank	Name	Nationality	1	2	3	4	5	6	Result	Notes
1st place, gold medalist(s)	Aleksey Fyodorov	Russia	16.77 (w: +0.2 m/s)	17.08 (w: +0.7 m/s)	17.13 (w: -0.1 m/s)	x (w: -0.5 m/s)	16.90 (w: +0.1 m/s)	17.10 (w: +0.7 m/s)	17.13 (w: -0.1 m/s)	SB
2nd place, silver medalist(s)	Gaëtan Saku Bafuanga	France	16.08 (w: -0.6 m/s)	16.00 (w: -0.5 m/s)	16.19 (w: +0.2 m/s)	16.57 (w: +0.6 m/s)	16.33 (w: +0.4 m/s)	16.56 (w: +0.2 m/s)	16.57 (w: +0.6 m/s)	
3rd place, bronze medalist(s)	Artem Primak	Russia	16.35 (w: -0.2 m/s)	16.37 (w: -0.5 m/s)	16.49 (w: +0.3 m/s)	16.20 (w: +1.1 m/s)	16.33 (w: 0.0 m/s)	16.43 (w: -0.9 m/s)	16.49 (w: +0.3 m/s)	
4	Aboubacar Bamba	France	16.34 (w: +1.2 m/s)	x (w: +0.2 m/s)	16.12 (w: +0.6 m/s)	16.27 (w: +0.8 m/s)	16.13 (w: +0.3 m/s)	16.42 (w: +0.8 m/s)	16.42 (w: +0.8 m/s)	
5	Aleksandr Yurchenko	Russia	x (w: -0.1 m/s)	16.33 (w: +1.0 m/s)	16.27 (w: +0.7 m/s)	x (w: +0.9 m/s)	x (w: +0.9 m/s)	16.15 (w: -0.3 m/s)	16.33 (w: +1.0 m/s)	
6	Alexandru George Baciu	Romania	x (w: +0.9 m/s)	16.33 (w: +0.3 m/s)	x (w: +0.4 m/s)	x (w: -0.2 m/s)	16.00 (w: -0.4 m/s)	x (w: +1.1 m/s)	16.33 (w: +0.3 m/s)	=SB
7	Kévin Luron	France	16.19 (w: -0.1 m/s)	15.86 (w: +0.3 m/s)	16.13 (w: +0.1 m/s)	15.34 (w: -0.4 m/s)	x (w: -0.8 m/s)	x (w: +0.3 m/s)	16.19 (w: -0.1 m/s)	SB
8	Pablo Torrijos	Spain	16.00 (w: -0.3 m/s)	15.69 (w: 0.0 m/s)	15.85 (w: -0.5 m/s)	15.92 (w: +0.9 m/s)	16.06 (w: -0.4 m/s)	16.05 (w: +0.3 m/s)	16.06 (w: -0.4 m/s)	
9	Panayiotis Volou	Cyprus	15.25 (w: -0.1 m/s)	15.51 (w: -0.4 m/s)	15.79 (w: +0.6 m/s)				15.79 (w: +0.6 m/s)	
10	Vicente Docavo	Spain	15.78 (w: +0.3 m/s)	x (w: -0.1 m/s)	x (w: +1.1 m/s)				15.78 (w: +0.3 m/s)	
11	Maksim Nesterenka	Belarus	15.32 (w: +0.9 m/s)	15.59 (w: +1.0 m/s)	x (w: +0.6 m/s)				15.59 (w: +1.0 m/s)	
12	Andreas Graber	Switzerland	15.30 (w: +1.5 m/s)	15.25 (w: -0.1 m/s)	15.53 (w: +0.1 m/s)				15.53 (w: +0.1 m/s)	

=== Qualifications ===
Qualified: qualifying perf. 16.20 (Q) or 12 best performers (q) advance to the Final

==== Summary ====
Rank	Name	Nationality	Result	Notes
1	Aleksey Fyodorov	Russia	16.79	Q
2	Gaëtan Saku Bafuanga	France	16.72	Q
3	Aboubacar Bamba	France	16.34	Q
4	Alexandru George Baciu	Romania	16.33	Q SB
5	Aleksandr Yurchenko	Russia	16.24	Q
6	Vicente Docavo	Spain	16.15	q
7	Artem Primak	Russia	16.14	q
8	Pablo Torrijos	Spain	16.11	q
9	Maksim Nesterenka	Belarus	15.89	q
10	Kévin Luron	France	15.83	q
11	Panayiotis Volou	Cyprus	15.80	q
12	Andreas Graber	Switzerland	15.79	q
13	Maksym Sypniewski	Poland	15.72	
14	Tibor Galambos	Hungary	15.69	
15	Marcel Kornhardt	Germany	15.62	
16	Dávid László	Hungary	15.60	
17	Daniele Cavazzani	Italy	15.50	
18	Pávlos Bóftsis	Greece	15.48	
19	Antonino Trio	Italy	15.38	
20	Murad Ibadullayev	Azerbaijan	15.30	
21	Sergiu Caciuriac	Romania	14.61	
	Tom Yaacobov	Israel	NM	

==== Details ====
===== Group A =====
13 July 2013 / 12:45

Rank	Name	Nationality	Attempts			Result	Notes
Rank	Name	Nationality	1	2	3	Result	Notes
1	Gaëtan Saku Bafuanga	France	16.72 (w: -0.2 m/s)			16.72 (w: -0.2 m/s)	Q
2	Aleksandr Yurchenko	Russia	16.24 (w: 0.0 m/s)			16.24 (w: 0.0 m/s)	Q
3	Artem Primak	Russia	15.85 (w: +0.7 m/s)	16.14 (w: -0.7 m/s)	16.09 (w: -0.1 m/s)	16.14 (w: -0.7 m/s)	q
4	Pablo Torrijos	Spain	16.11 (w: -0.2 m/s)	15.91 (w: +0.6 m/s)	-	16.11 (w: -0.2 m/s)	q
5	Kévin Luron	France	15.79 (w: +0.6 m/s)	15.83 (w: -0.1 m/s)	15.82 (w: +0.5 m/s)	15.83 (w: -0.1 m/s)	q
6	Panayiotis Volou	Cyprus	15.22 (w: 0.0 m/s)	15.39 (w: -0.5 m/s)	15.80 (w: -0.2 m/s)	15.80 (w: -0.2 m/s)	q
7	Maksym Sypniewski	Poland	15.21 (w: 0.0 m/s)	15.68 (w: -0.7 m/s)	15.72 (w: +0.5 m/s)	15.72 (w: +0.5 m/s)	
8	Tibor Galambos	Hungary	15.69 (w: +0.3 m/s)	x (w: +1.1 m/s)	x (w: -0.1 m/s)	15.69 (w: +0.3 m/s)	
9	Daniele Cavazzani	Italy	15.50 (w: -0.1 m/s)	x (w: +0.7 m/s)	x (w: -0.2 m/s)	15.50 (w: -0.1 m/s)	
10	Murad Ibadullayev	Azerbaijan	15.30 (w: -0.8 m/s)	15.26 (w: -0.4 m/s)	15.15 (w: +1.2 m/s)	15.30 (w: -0.8 m/s)	
11	Sergiu Caciuriac	Romania	x (w: -0.6 m/s)	14.61 (w: +0.4 m/s)	13.12 (w: -0.6 m/s)	14.61 (w: +0.4 m/s)	

===== Group B =====
13 July 2013 / 12:45

Rank	Name	Nationality	Attempts			Result	Notes
Rank	Name	Nationality	1	2	3	Result	Notes
1	Aleksey Fyodorov	Russia	16.79 (w: +0.3 m/s)			16.79 (w: +0.3 m/s)	Q
2	Aboubacar Bamba	France	15.80 (w: -0.2 m/s)	15.73 (w: 0.0 m/s)	16.34 (w: +0.5 m/s)	16.34 (w: +0.5 m/s)	Q
3	Alexandru George Baciu	Romania	16.33 (w: +0.8 m/s)			16.33 (w: +0.8 m/s)	Q SB
4	Vicente Docavo	Spain	x (w: +0.7 m/s)	16.15 (w: +0.4 m/s)	x	16.15 (w: +0.4 m/s)	q
5	Maksim Nesterenka	Belarus	15.17 (w: +0.2 m/s)	15.84 (w: +0.8 m/s)	15.89 (w: -1.3 m/s)	15.89 (w: -1.3 m/s)	q
6	Andreas Graber	Switzerland	15.46 (w: +0.5 m/s)	15.47 (w: -0.5 m/s)	15.79 (w: -1.0 m/s)	15.79 (w: -1.0 m/s)	q
7	Marcel Kornhardt	Germany	15.62 (w: -0.8 m/s)	15.43 (w: -0.4 m/s)	15.39 (w: +0.6 m/s)	15.62 (w: -0.8 m/s)	
8	Dávid László	Hungary	15.39 (w: +0.3 m/s)	15.60 (w: +0.3 m/s)	15.55 (w: +1.7 m/s)	15.60 (w: +0.3 m/s)	
9	Pávlos Bóftsis	Greece	15.27 (w: +0.9 m/s)	15.48 (w: 0.0 m/s)	14.93 (w: -0.8 m/s)	15.48 (w: 0.0 m/s)	
10	Antonino Trio	Italy	15.38 (w: +0.9 m/s)	13.96 (w: -0.6 m/s)	14.95 (w: -0.1 m/s)	15.38 (w: +0.9 m/s)	
	Tom Yaacobov	Israel	x (w: +0.4 m/s)	x (w: -0.1 m/s)	x (w: -0.3 m/s)	NM	

== Participation ==
According to an unofficial count, 22 athletes from 14 countries participated in the event.

- Azerbaijan (1)
- Belarus (1)
- Cyprus (1)
- France (3)
- Germany (1)
- Greece (1)
- Hungary (2)
- Israel (1)
- Italy (2)
- Poland (1)
- Romania (2)
- Russia (3)
- Spain (2)
- Switzerland (1)
