= Athletics at the 2010 South American Games – Men's triple jump =

The Men's triple jump event at the 2010 South American Games was held on March 23 at 17:30.

== Medalists ==
| Gold | Silver | Bronze |
|---|---|---|
| Robin Mosquera; Colombia | Jean Rosa; Brazil | José Adrián Sornoza; Ecuador |

== Records ==
Standing records prior to the 2010 South American Games
| World record | Jonathan Edwards | Great Britain | 18.29m | Gothenburg, Sweden | 7 August 1995 |
| World Leading | Osniel Tosca | Cuba | 17.12 | Havana, Cuba | 11 February 2010 |
| South American record | Jadel Gregório | Brazil | 17.90m | Belém, Brazil | 20 May 2007 |
| South American U23 record | João Carlos de Oliveira | Brazil | 17.89m | Mexico City, Mexico | 15 October 1975 |

== Results ==
Results were published.

=== Final ===
| Rank | Athlete | Nationality | Attempt | | | | | | Best Result | Notes |
| Rank | Athlete | Nationality | 1 | 2 | 3 | 4 | 5 | 6 | Best Result | Notes |
|---|---|---|---|---|---|---|---|---|---|---|
| 1st place, gold medalist(s) | Robin Mosquera | Colombia | 15.96 | 16.12 | 16.26 | 15.94 | 16.02 | 16.27 | 16.27 (wind: +0.3 m/s) | |
| 2nd place, silver medalist(s) | Jean Rosa | Brazil | 16.22 | x | 16.04 | 15.30 | 15.87 | 15.92 | 16.22 (wind: +3.2 m/s) | w |
| 3rd place, bronze medalist(s) | José Adrián Sornoza | Ecuador | 15.97 | x | 16.02 | x | x | 15.59 | 16.02 (wind: +1.3 m/s) | |
| 4 | Maximiliano Díaz | Argentina | 15.61 | 16.00 | 15.43 | 15.61 | 15.78 | x | 15.74 (wind: +1.4 m/s) | |
| 5 | Manuel Montaño | Colombia | x | 15.85 | x | 15.64 | 15.58 | 15.61 | 15.85 (wind: +3.9 m/s) | w |
| 6 | Fernando da Cunha Filho | Brazil | x | 15.24 | 15.74 | x | 14.89 | 15.32 | 15.74 (wind: +1.8 m/s) | |
| 7 | Cristóbal Gómez | Chile | 14.64 | x | x | 14.28 | 14.16 | x | 14.64 (wind: +2.4 m/s) | w |
| 8 | Miguel Alfaro | Bolivia | x | x | 14.12 | 13.89 | x | 13.98 | 14.12 (wind: +2.7 m/s) | w |
| 9 | Iván Ortiz | Bolivia | x | 13.81 | 13.87 | | | | 13.87 (wind: +2.6 m/s) | w |
| 10 | Sandro Corona | Chile | x | 13.50 | 13.56 | | | | 13.56 (wind: +1.9 m/s) | |

== See also ==
- 2010 South American Under-23 Championships in Athletics
