= Athletics at the 2019 Pan American Games – Men's triple jump =

Men's triple jump at the 2019 Pan American Games
- Venue: Athletics Stadium
- Dates: August 10
- Competitors: 12 from 7 nations
- Winning distance: 17.42

Medalists
Gold medal	Omar Craddock	United States
Silver medal	Jordan Díaz	Cuba
Bronze medal	Andy Díaz	Cuba

The men's triple jump competition of the athletics events at the 2019 Pan American Games took place on the 10 of August at the 2019 Pan American Games Athletics Stadium. The defending Pan American Games champion is Pedro Pablo Pichardo from Cuba.

== Records ==
Prior to this competition, the existing world and Pan American Games records were as follows:

World record	Jonathan Edwards (GBR)	18.29	Gothenburg, Sweden	August 7, 1995
Pan American Games record	João Carlos de Oliveira (BRA)	17.89	Mexico City, Mexico	October 15, 1975

== Schedule ==
Date	Time	Round
August 10, 2019	14:30	Final

== Results ==
All times shown are in meters.

KEY:	q	Fastest non-qualifiers	Q	Qualified	NR	National record	PB	Personal best	SB	Seasonal best	DQ	Disqualified

=== Final ===
The results were as follows:

Rank	Name	Nationality	#1	#2	#3	#4	#5	#6	Mark	Notes
1st place, gold medalist(s)	Omar Craddock	United States	17.13	17.19	16.98	–	17.42	x	17.42	
2nd place, silver medalist(s)	Jordan Díaz	Cuba	16.76	17.19	17.03	17.38	x	17.18	17.38	SB
3rd place, bronze medalist(s)	Andy Díaz	Cuba	x	16.83	x	x	16.49	x	16.83	
4	Almir dos Santos	Brazil	16.70	15.84	x	16.48	x	16.33	16.70	
5	Clive Pullen	Jamaica	x	16.35	16.05	16.34	x	x	16.35	
6	Christopher Carter	United States	16.21	16.29	x	16.28	16.22	x	16.29	
7	Leodan Torrealba	Venezuela	16.12	x	16.27	15.91	15.74	15.97	16.27	PB
8	Alexsandro Melo	Brazil	16.23	x	14.78	–	–	–	16.23	
9	Jordan Scott	Jamaica	15.93	15.82	16.13				16.13	
10	Maximiliano Díaz	Argentina	15.97	x	x				15.97	
11	Lanthone Collie	Bahamas	x	15.68	15.78				15.78	
	Latario Collie-Minns	Bahamas	x	–	–				NM	
