= Athletics at the 2010 South American Games – Men's long jump =

The Men's Long Jump event at the 2010 South American Games was held on March 21 at 17:30.

== Medalists ==
Gold	Silver	Bronze
Jorge McFarlane (Peru) Perú	Javier McFarlane (Peru) Perú	Lourival de Almeida Neto; Brazil

== Records ==
Standing records prior to the 2010 South American Games
World record	Mike Powell	United States	8.95m	Tokyo, Japan	30 August 1991
World Leading	Wilfredo Martínez	Cuba	8.20m	Havana, Cuba	5 February 2010
South American record	Irving Saladino	(Panama) Panamá	8.73m	Hengelo, Netherlands	24 May 2008
South American U23 record	Irving Saladino	(Panama) Panamá	8.29m	Sevilla, Spain	4 June 2005

== Results ==
Results were published.

=== Final ===
Rank	Athlete	Nationality	Attempt						Best Result	Notes
Rank	Athlete	Nationality	1	2	3	4	5	6	Best Result	Notes
1st place, gold medalist(s)	Jorge McFarlane	(Peru) Perú	7.98	x	x	–	x	8.09	8.09	
1st place, gold medalist(s)	Jorge McFarlane	(Peru) Perú	(wind: +2.8 m/s)	(wind: +3.5 m/s)	(wind: -0.3 m/s)		(wind: +0.9 m/s)	(wind: +1.8 m/s)	(wind: +1.8 m/s)	
–	Jhamal Bowen	(Panama) Panamá	Series not known						7.97	AJR, SB, =PB, ^{†}
–	Jhamal Bowen	(Panama) Panamá							(wind: +1.5 m/s)	AJR, SB, =PB, ^{†}
2nd place, silver medalist(s)	Javier McFarlane	(Peru) Perú	x	x	7.16	7.62	7.39	7.44	7.62	
2nd place, silver medalist(s)	Javier McFarlane	(Peru) Perú	(wind: +3.2 m/s)	(wind: +1.1 m/s)	(wind: +0.2 m/s)	(wind: +1.0 m/s)	(wind: +2.8 m/s)	(wind: +0.6 m/s)	(wind: +1.0 m/s)	
3rd place, bronze medalist(s)	Lourival de Almeida Neto	Brazil	x	7.31	x	7.45	7.41	x	7.45	
3rd place, bronze medalist(s)	Lourival de Almeida Neto	Brazil	(wind: +1.1 m/s)	(wind: +2.6 m/s)	(wind: +1.2 m/s)	(wind: +0.0 m/s)	(wind: +2.1 m/s)	(wind: +1.4 m/s)	(wind: +0.0 m/s)	
4	Emiliano Lasa	Uruguay	6.93	7.26	7.03	7.33	6.78	7.04	7.33	
4	Emiliano Lasa	Uruguay	(wind: +1.4 m/s)	(wind: +1.7 m/s)	(wind: +1.0 m/s)	(wind: +0.0 m/s)	(wind: -0.4 m/s)	(wind: +1.8 m/s)	(wind: +0.0 m/s)	
5	Maximiliano Díaz	Argentina	7.10	7.07	7.09	7.32	6.97	6.80	7.32	
5	Maximiliano Díaz	Argentina	(wind: +1.1 m/s)	(wind: -0.1 m/s)	(wind: +1.7 m/s)	(wind: +1.3 m/s)	(wind: +1.3 m/s)	(wind: +0.6 m/s)	(wind: +1.3 m/s)	
6	José Adrián Sornoza	Ecuador	x	7.20	7.16	–	–	–	7.20	w
6	José Adrián Sornoza	Ecuador	(wind: +3.1 m/s)	(wind: +3.2 m/s)	(wind: +0.9 m/s)				(wind: +3.2 m/s)	w
7	Robin Mosquera	Colombia	6.99	7.11	6.99	7.02	–	–	7.11	
7	Robin Mosquera	Colombia	(wind: +2.5 m/s)	(wind: +1.6 m/s)	(wind: +1.1 m/s)	(wind: +0.6 m/s)			(wind: +1.6 m/s)	
8	Diego Ferrín	Ecuador	7.05	7.04	6.90				7.05	w
8	Diego Ferrín	Ecuador	(wind: +4.1 m/s)	(wind: +1.9 m/s)	(wind: +1.5 m/s)				(wind: +4.1 m/s)	w
9	Sandro Corona	Chile	6.99	3.10	6.57				6.99	
9	Sandro Corona	Chile	(wind: +1.4 m/s)	(wind: +0.2 m/s)	(wind: +1.4 m/s)				(wind: +1.4 m/s)	
10	Miguel Alfaro	Bolivia	6.25	6.45	6.32				6.45	
10	Miguel Alfaro	Bolivia	(wind: +0.8 m/s)	(wind: +1.8 m/s)	(wind: +0.3 m/s)				(wind: +1.8 m/s)	
–	Willian Barrionuevo	Brazil	x	x	x				NM	
–	Willian Barrionuevo	Brazil	(wind: +2.0 m/s)	(wind: +0.9 m/s)	(wind: +0.5 m/s)					

^{†}: Only eligible for the South American Under-23 Championships.

== See also ==
- 2010 South American Under-23 Championships in Athletics
