= Athletics at the 2015 Pan American Games – Men's triple jump =

Men's triple jump at the 2015 Pan American Games
- Venue: CIBC Pan Am and Parapan Am Athletics Stadium
- Dates: July 24
- Competitors: 15 from 11 nations
- Winning distance: 17.54

Medalists
Gold medal	Pedro Pablo Pichardo	Cuba
Silver medal	Leevan Sands	Bahamas
Bronze medal	Ernesto Revé	Cuba

The men's triple jump competition of the athletics events at the 2015 Pan American Games took place on July 24 at the CIBC Pan Am and Parapan Am Athletics Stadium. The defending Pan American Games champion is Alexis Copello of Cuba.

== Records ==
Prior to this competition, the existing world and Pan American Games records were as follows:

World record	Jonathan Edwards (GBR)	18.29	Gothenburg, Sweden	August 7, 1995
Pan American Games record	João Carlos de Oliveira (BRA)	17.89	Mexico City, Mexico	October 15, 1975

== Qualification ==
Each National Olympic Committee (NOC) was able to enter up to two entrants providing they had met the minimum standard (16.17) in the qualifying period (January 1, 2014 to June 28, 2015).

== Schedule ==
Date	Time	Round
July 24, 2015	11:35	Final

== Results ==
All results shown are in meters.

KEY:	q	Best non-qualifiers	Q	Qualified	NR	National record	PB	Personal best	SB	Seasonal best	NM	No measurements	DQ	Disqualified

=== Final ===
Rank	Name	Nationality	#1	#2	#3	#4	#5	#6	Mark	Wind	Notes
1st place, gold medalist(s)	Pedro Pablo Pichardo	Cuba	17.29	x	17.46	17.54	–	17.34	17.54	+2.1	
2nd place, silver medalist(s)	Leevan Sands	Bahamas	16.19	16.79	x	x	16.99	14.74	16.99	+1.7	SB
3rd place, bronze medalist(s)	Ernesto Revé	Cuba	x	16.94	x	x	–	x	16.94	+0.9	
4	Yordanys Durañona	Dominica	x	16.64	16.72	16.67	x	16.70	16.72	+0.1	
5	Jefferson Sabino	Brazil	x	15.84	16.40	16.43	x	x	16.43	+3.0	
6	Samyr Lainé	Haiti	16.43	x	x	16.31	x	16.38	16.43	+0.8	SB
7	Miguel van Assen	Suriname	15.83	16.25	16.21	x	15.89	13.49	16.25	+1.3	
8	Álvaro Cortez	Chile	x	15.84	16.16	x	x	x	16.16	+1.0	
9	Elton Walcott	Trinidad and Tobago	15.40	16.05	16.15				16.15	+0.3	
10	Lathario Collie-Minns	Bahamas	x	15.50	16.08				16.08	-0.4	
10	Jhon Murillo	Colombia	15.50	x	16.08				16.08	+1.7	
12	Alphonso Jordan	United States	15.98	x	15.99				15.99	+0.6	
13	Tacuma Anderson-Richards	Canada	15.21	x	15.89				15.89	+2.6	
14	Jean-Cassimiro Rosa	Brazil	x	15.79	15.67				15.79	+3.7	
	Aaron Hernandez	Canada	x	x	x				NM		
