= Ernesto Revé =

Cuban triple jumper (born 1992)

Personal information
- Full name: Ernesto Revé Serrano
- Born: 12 February 1992 (age 34) Guantánamo, Cuba

Sport
- Sport: Athletics
- Event: Triple jump
Medal record
Pan American Games
Bronze medal – third place	2015 Toronto	Triple jump
World Indoor Championships
Gold medal – first place	2014 Sopot	Triple jump
- Updated on 26 December 2014

Ernesto Revé Serrano (born 12 February 1992 in Guantánamo) is a Cuban triple jumper. Revé won gold medal at the 2014 IAAF World Indoor Championships and silver medal 2010 World Junior Championships in Athletics.

== Personal bests ==
Event	Result	Venue	Date
Outdoor
Triple jump	17.58 m (wind: -1.7 m/s)	(Cuba) La Habana	7 Feb 2014
Indoor
Triple jump	17.33 m	(Poland) Sopot	9 Mar 2014

== International competitions ==
Year	Competition	Venue	Position	Event	Notes
Representing Cuba
2009	ALBA Games	La Habana, Cuba	7th	Triple jump	16.09 m (wind: +1.7 m/s)
2009	World Youth Championship	Bressanone, Italy	—	Triple jump	NM
2010	World Junior Championships	Moncton, New Brunswick, Canada	2nd	Triple jump	16.47 m (wind: -1.7 m/s)
2014	World Indoor Championships	Sopot, Poland	1st	Triple jump	17.33 m
2014	Central American and Caribbean Games	Xalapa, Mexico	1st	Triple jump	16.94 m A (wind: -0.1 m/s)
2015	Pan American Games	Toronto, Canada	3rd	Triple jump	16.94 m
2016	Olympic Games	Rio de Janeiro, Brazil	14th (q)	Triple jump	16.58 m
