= Omar Craddock =

American track and field athlete

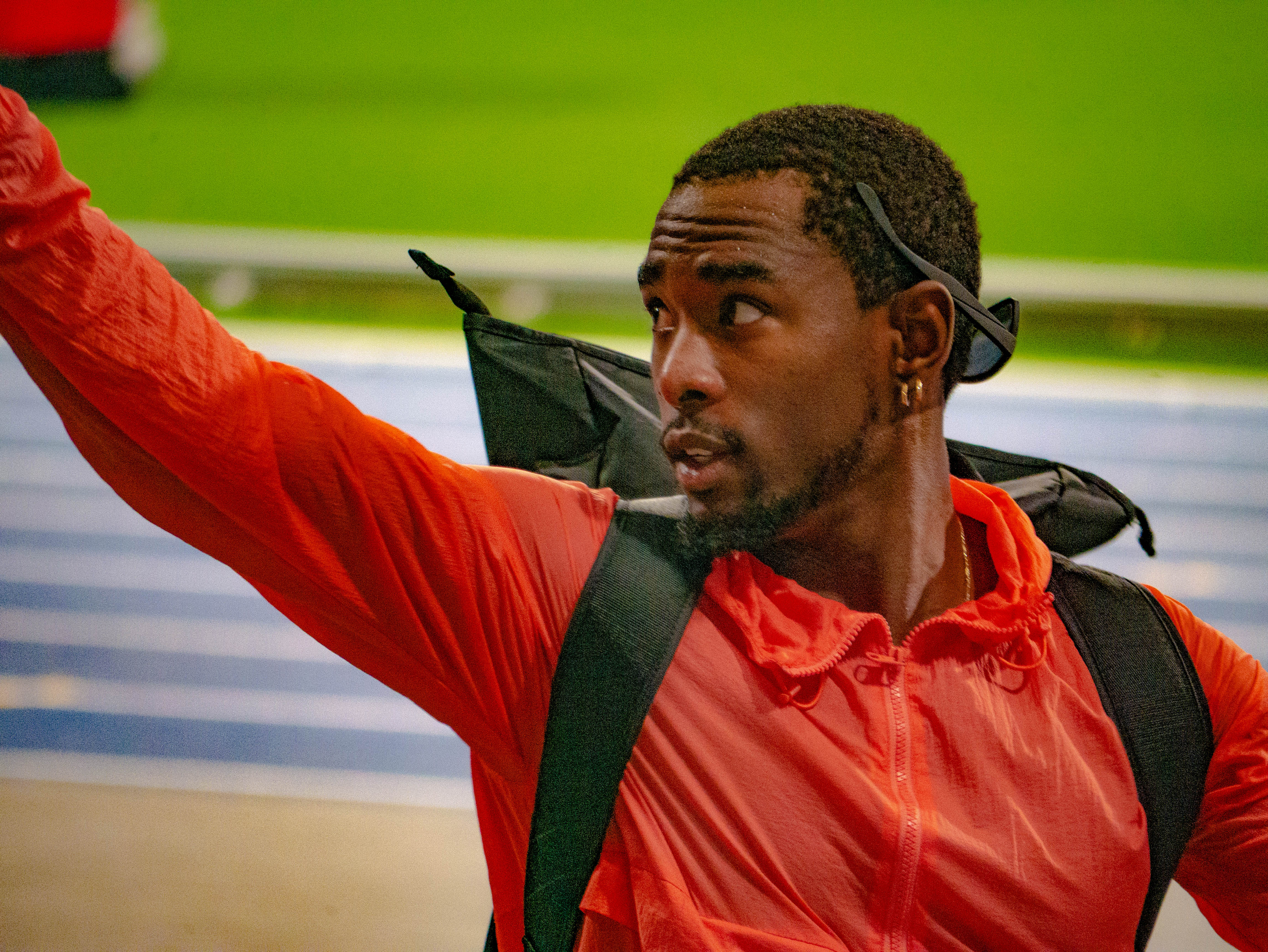
- Craddock in 2019

Personal information
- Nationality: American
- Born: 26 April 1991 (age 35)

Sport
- Sport: Track and field
- Event: Triple jump

Achievements and titles
- Personal bests: Triple jump: 17,68 m Long jump: 7,60 m 100 meters: 10.90 s
Medal record
Men's athletics
Representing the United States
Pan American Games
Gold medal – first place	2019 Lima	Triple jump
- Updated on 28 September 2019

Omar Craddock (born April 26, 1991) is an American track and field athlete who competes in the triple jump. With the University of Florida he won one indoor and two outdoor NCAA titles in the event. He competed alongside Christian Taylor and Will Claye in a succession of elite level triple jumpers to come from the Florida Gators track and field team.

He was the bronze medalist at the 2010 World Junior Championships in Athletics. In 2013 he won the national triple jump title at the USA Outdoor Track and Field Championships. His personal best for the triple jump is 17.68 m (58 ft 0 in).

Craddock served a 20 month competition ban from 2020 to 2022 following an anti-doping regulation violation relating to missed tests.

== Career ==
=== Early life ===
Raised in Killeen, Texas, he attended Killeen High School and enjoyed basketball, American football and baseball. He began to achieve good marks in the triple jump in 2008 – his best that year was 15.53 m, which brought him second at the AAU Junior Olympic Games. He was also the state champion in the event in 2008.

=== College athletics ===
He gained an athletics scholarship at the University of Florida and began to compete collegiately for the Florida Gators track and field team. In his first year there he quickly established himself as one of the school's best ever jumpers. He jumped 16.19 m (53 ft 1 1/4 in) (his first over sixteen metres) to take third at the Southeastern Conference indoor championship and placed seventh at the NCAA Indoor Championship. He was runner-up at the Florida Relays, won at the Penn Relays. A second-place finish at the 2010 SEC Outdoor Championship helped the Florida Gators to their first team title in over twenty years. A sixth-place finish at the NCAA Outdoor Championship gave Craddock his second All-American honour for the year. He ended the season with his first international medal: after a personal best of 16.56 m (54 ft 3 3/4 in) to win the national junior title he took bronze at the 2010 World Junior Championships in Athletics.

The 2011 collegiate season began with school-best performances: at the SEC Indoor Championships the Florida Gators swept the men's triple jump through Christian Taylor, Will Claye and Craddock. The three produced the best jump's in the school's history and Craddock was third with a best of 16.57 m (54 ft 4 1/4 in). He came fifth at the NCAA Indoors and won his first outdoor meet at the Penn Relays, but missed the rest of the outdoor season. In his third year with the Gators he reached new highs as his teammates Taylor and Claye finished their studies. He won both the SEC Indoor and NCAA Indoor Championship titles, setting a new personal record of 16.75 m (54 ft 11 1/4 in) at the latter event. An outdoor best of 16.71 m (54 ft 9 3/4 in) followed and he secured both the SEC and NCAA Outdoor titles too – following in the footsteps of Taylor's 2010 feat. He placed fourth at the 2012 Olympic Trials, where his former Gator teammates took the top spots.

In his fourth and final year at Florida, Craddock found strong competition indoors. At the SEC Indoors he jumped 16.49 m (54 ft 1 in) but was narrowly beaten by Tarik Batchelor. He cleared a new best of 16.80 m (55 ft 1 1/4 in) at the NCAA Indoors, but was again runner-up as Bryce Lamb jumped almost seventeen metres. In the outdoor season Craddock began an undefeated streak, starting at the Texas Relays. He retained his SEC and the NCAA triple jump titles and improved his best to 16.92 m (55 ft 6 in). He got the better of Will Claye at the 2013 USA Outdoor Track and Field Championships to win his first national title in a wind-assisted 17.15 m (56 ft 3 in).

== Personal bests ==
- Triple jump (outdoor): 17.68 m (58 ft 0 in) (2019)
- Triple jump (outdoor): 17.53 m (57 ft 6 in) (2015)
- Triple jump (outdoor): 17.15 m (56 ft 3 in) (2013)
- Triple jump (outdoor): 17.26 m (56 ft 7 1/2 in)w (2014)
- Triple jump (indoor): 16.80 m (55 ft 1 1/4 in) (2013)
- Long jump (indoor): 7.63 m (25 ft 1/4 in) (2013)

== National titles ==
- NCAA Indoor titles: 2012
- NCAA Outdoor titles: 2012, 2013
- USA Outdoor titles: 2013, 2015

== International competitions ==
Year	Competition	Venue	Position	Notes
2010	World Junior Championships	Moncton, Canada	3rd	16.23 m (-3.6 m/s)
2013	World Championships	Moscow, Russia	18th (q)	16.40 m
2015	World Championships	Beijing, China	4th	17.37 m
2016	World Indoor Championships	Portland, United States	5th	16.87 m
2019	Pan American Games	Lima, Peru	1st	17.42 m
2019	World Championships	Doha, Qatar	13th (q)	16.87 m
