= Artyom Primak =

Russian long and triple jumper (born 1993)

Personal information
- Native name: Артём Алексеевич Примак
- Nationality: Russia; Authorised Neutral Athletes
- Born: Artyom Alekseevich Primak; Artem Primak; 14 January 1993 (33 years, 200 days old)
- Home town: Amur Oblast, Russia
- Education: Amur Oblast Regional Sports School
- Height: 190 cm (6 ft 3 in)
- Weight: 77 kg (170 lb)

Sport
- Sport: Athletics
- Events: Long jump Triple jump
- Club: Krasnodar-Khabarovsk
- Coached by: Sergey Petrenko

Achievements and titles
- National finals: 2011 Russian Indoor U20s; • Triple jump, 5th; 2011 Russian U20s; • Long jump, 4th; • Triple jump, 4th; 2012 Russian Indoor U20s; • Triple jump, 1st (gold); 2012 Russian U20s; • Long jump, 2nd (silver); • Triple jump, 1st (gold); 2013 Russian Indoors; • Triple jump, 8th; 2013 Russian Indoor U23s; • Long jump, 4th; • Triple jump, 2nd (silver); 2013 Russian U23s; • Long jump, 4th; • Triple jump, 1st (gold); 2013 Russian Champs; • Triple jump, 3rd (bronze); 2014 Russian U23s; • Triple jump, 4th; 2015 Russian Indoors; • Triple jump, 5th; 2015 Russian Indoor U23s; • Long jump, 3rd (bronze); • Triple jump, 1st (gold); 2016 Russian Champs; • Long jump, 9th; 2017 Russian Indoors; • Long jump, 1st (gold); 2017 Russian Champs; • Long jump, 1st (gold); • Triple jump, 1st (gold); 2018 Russian Indoors; • Long jump, 2nd (silver); 2018 Russian Champs; • Long jump, 5th; 2019 Russian Indoors; • Long jump, 3rd (bronze); 2019 Russian Champs; • Long jump, 1st (gold); 2020 Russian Indoors; • Long jump, 2nd (silver); 2020 Russian Champs; • Long jump, 2nd (silver); 2021 Russian Indoors; • Long jump, 5th; 2021 Russian Champs; • Long jump, 2nd (silver); 2022 Russian Indoors; • Long jump, 4th; 2022 Russian Champs; • Long jump, 3rd (bronze); 2023 Russian Champs; • Long jump, 1st (gold)
- Personal bests: LJ: 8.22m (+0.7) (2017); TJ: 17.17m (+0.2) (2017)
Medal record
Men's athletics
Representing Russia
World U20 Championships
| Silver medal – second place | 2012 Barcelona | Triple jump |
European U23 Championships
| Bronze medal – third place | 2013 Tampere | Triple jump |
- Updated on 29 December 2023

Artyom Alekseevich Primak (Russian: Артём Алексеевич Примак; born 14 January 1993), also spelled Artem Primak, is a Russian long and triple jumper. He was the 2012 World U20 Championships silver medallist in the triple jump, and he is a four-time Russian Athletics Championships winner in the horizontal jumps.

== Biography ==
Primak is from Amur Oblast, Russia, where he graduated from the Amur Regional Sports School in 2010 and was coached by Sergey Petrenko.

In 2012, Primak was selected to represent Russia at the World U20 Championships in the triple jump. Primak won the silver medal, losing only to future Olympic gold medalist Pedro Pichardo. He also won the triple jump bronze medal at the 2013 European U23 Championships.

In 2017, Primak set personal bests in both the long and triple jump at the Russian Athletics Championships. He was benefited by the absence of Alexander Menkov, who chose to focus on the world championships instead, allowing Primak to take the win in both events. Coming off of this success, he applied to compete internationally as an Authorized Neutral Athlete (following the ban of Russian athletes by World Athletics), but his application was rejected in 2018.

In May 2021, Primak was finally approved to compete internationally as a neutral athlete.

Primak also won the 2022 All-Russian Summer Sports Spartakiade with a 7.84 metres mark.

Primak won the 2023 Russian Athletics Championships in Chelyabinsk with a mark of 7.89 metres. He now competes representing the Krasnodar and Khabarovsk regions, and focuses primarily on the long jump.

== Statistics ==
=== Personal bests ===
| Event | Mark | Place | Competition | Venue | Date | Ref |
|---|---|---|---|---|---|---|
| Long jump | 8.22 m (+0.7 m/s) | 1st place, gold medalist(s) | Russian Athletics Championships | Zhukovsky, Moscow Oblast, Russia | 29 July 2017 | |
| Triple jump | 17.17 m (+0.2 m/s) | 1st place, gold medalist(s) | Russian Athletics Championships | Zhukovsky, Moscow Oblast, Russia | 29 July 2017 | |
