= Maksim Niastsiarenka =

Belarusian triple jumper

Personal information
- Born: 1 September 1992 (age 33)
- Height: 1.93 m (6 ft 4 in)
- Weight: 82 kg (181 lb)

Sport
- Sport: Athletics
- Event: Triple jump

Maksim Siarhieyevich Niastsiarenka (Belarusian: Максім Сяргеевіч Несцярэнка; born 1 September 1992) is a Belarusian athlete competing primarily in the triple jump. He represented his country at the 2016 Summer Olympics without qualifying for the final.

His personal bests in the event are 16.85 metres outdoors (+1.9 m/s, Grodno 2016) and 16.66 metres indoors (Minsk 2015).

== International competitions ==
Year	Competition	Venue	Position	Event	Notes
Representing Belarus
2013	European U23 Championships	Tampere, Finland	11th	Triple jump	15.59 m
2015	European Indoor Championships	Prague, Czech Republic	19th (q)	Triple jump	15.15 m
2016	European Championships	Amsterdam, Netherlands	5th	Triple jump	16.63 m
2016	Olympic Games	Rio de Janeiro, Brazil	20th (q)	Triple jump	16.52 m
2021	European Indoor Championships	Toruń, Poland	9th (q)	Triple jump	16.24 m
