= Vicente Docavo =

Spanish triple jumper

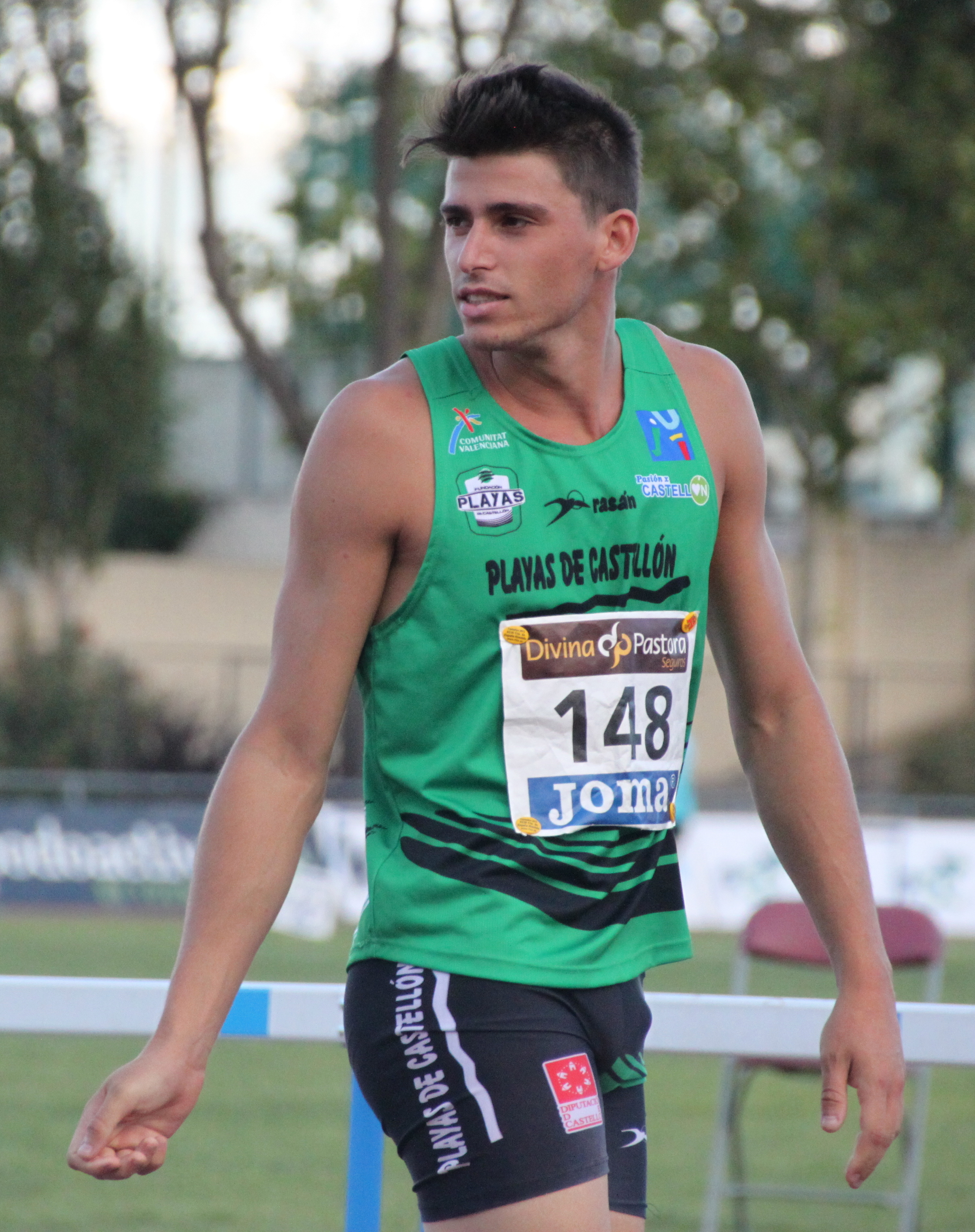
Image of Vicente Docavo

Vicente Docavo (born 13 February 1992) is a retired Spanish triple jumper.

He finished tenth at the 2013 European U23 Championships. He also competed at the 2010 World Junior Championships, the 2011 European Indoor Championships, the 2012 European Championships and the 2013 European Indoor Championships without reaching the final.

His personal best jump is 16.72 metres, achieved in June 2012 in Huelva. This was also a new meet record for the Meeting Iberoamericano de Atletismo.

== International competitions ==
Year	Competition	Venue	Position	Event	Notes
Representing Spain
2009	World Youth Championships	Brixen, Italy	10th	Triple jump	14.74 m
2009	European Youth Olympic Festival	Tampere, Finland	4th	Triple jump	15.14 m
2010	Gymnasiade	Doha, Qatar	6th	Triple jump	15.07 m
2010	World Junior Championships	Moncton, Canada	11th (q)	Triple jump	15.07
2011	European Indoor Championships	Paris, France	16th (q)	Triple jump	16.28 m
2011	European Junior Championships	Tallinn, Estonia	5th	Triple jump	15.74 m
2012	European Championships	Helsinki, Finland	13th (q)	Triple jump	14.28 m
2013	European Indoor Championships	Gothenburg, Sweden	12th (q)	Triple jump	16.46 m
2013	European U23 Championships	Tampere, Finland	10th	Triple jump	15.78 m
2014	Mediterranean U23 Championship	Aubagne, France	6th	Triple jump	15.79 m
