= Samyr Lainé =

Haitian-American triple jumper

Samyr Laine
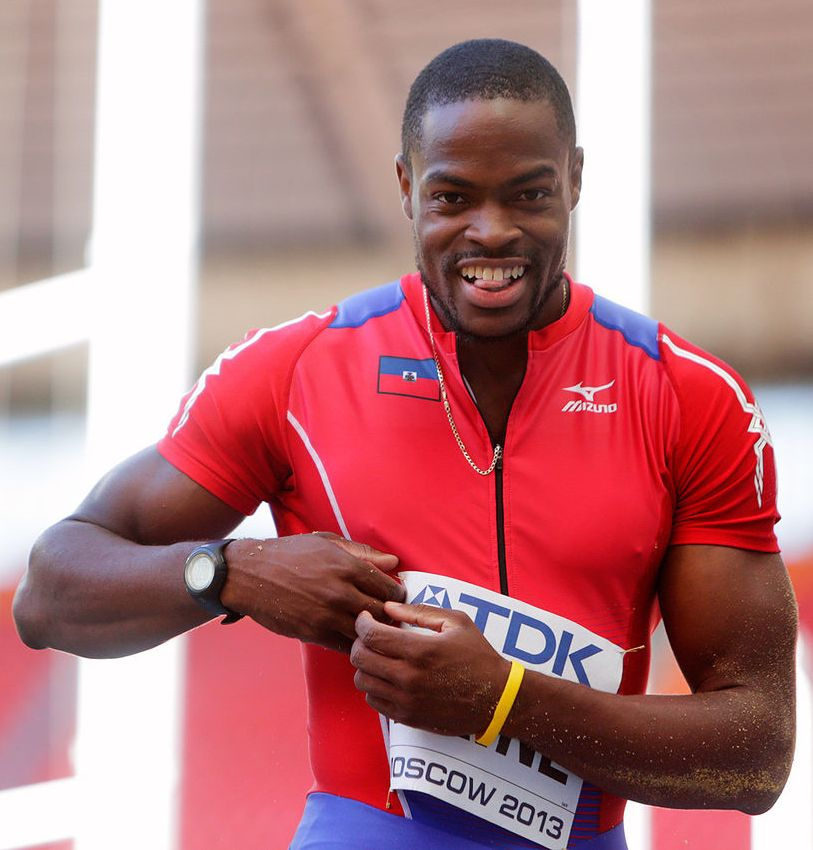
- Laine at 2013 World Championships in Athletics

Personal information
- Born: July 17, 1984 (age 41) Nyack, New York
- Height: 1.88 m (6 ft 2 in)
- Weight: 84 kg (185 lb)

Sport
- Country: Haiti
- Sport: Athletics
- Event: Triple Jump
- Coached by: Emanuel "Skeeter" Jackson

Achievements and titles
- Olympic finals: Triple Jump, 2012, London
- World finals: Triple Jump, 2013, Moscow
- Highest world ranking: 7
- Personal best: Outdoors: 17.39m – 2009, Indoors: 16.91m – 2010
- Updated on December 27, 2014

Samyr Laine (born July 17, 1984) is a Haitian-American triple jumper who competed for Haiti at the 2012 Summer Olympics and other international competitions since the 2007 Pan American Games.

== Early life ==
Laine's parents were born in Haiti. In 7th grade, while attending Newburgh Free Academy, he began pursuing track and field, but was cut from the team the next year.

During the 2000 Sydney Olympics Laine watched and recorded every athletics event, reviving his passion for track and field, where he decided to focus on the triple jump. In August 2002, he participated as a triple jumper in the 2002 Empire State Games, where he finished seventh.

== Education and training ==
During his senior year of high school was when he was able to get a full year of athletics. He made substantial gains that year in what would quickly become his best event, the triple jump, improving from the 42 feet (12.80m) the year before to 45 feet (13.70m) indoors and then 46 feet (14m) outdoors, good enough for 3rd place at the State Championships. After being recruited by nearly all the Ivy League Schools, Laine chose to attend Harvard University. In his freshman year, he was roommates with Mark Zuckerberg.

In his four years at Harvard University his jump improved over 7 feet (2.15m). After two second-place finishes at the conference championships in his freshman year, he placed first in indoors and outdoors for the next two years. In his junior year, although battling with some injuries, he was able to achieve the status of All-American at the NCAA Championships. At that meet, he set what was the Ivy League record at the time and is still the Harvard University triple jump record of 51 feet, 11 1/4 inches and Harvard's outdoor triple jump record of 53 feet, 7 1/2 inches. The following year he struggled with more injuries and was forced to “red shirt” his final outdoor season and watch the team of which he had been voted captain from the sidelines. His injury enabled him to use his final season of collegiate eligibility at the University of Texas at Austin, where he finished his graduate program in 2007. He was able to return to his 2005 form, and achieved the Pan American Games standard. He later graduated from the Georgetown University Law Center in 2010.

== Athletic career ==
It was in 2007 that he first competed under the Haitian flag. Although he was born in the United States, both of his parents and the majority of his extended family had emigrated from Haiti, which allowed him to represent the nation at the Pan American Games in Rio de Janeiro, Brazil and beyond.

Year	Competition	Venue	Position	Event	Notes
Representing Haiti
2007	Pan American Games	Rio de Janeiro, Brazil	10th	Triple jump	15.45 m (wind: +1.3 m/s)
2009	World Championships	Berlin, Germany	29th (q)	Triple jump	16.34 m (wind: 0.0 m/s)
2010	World Indoor Championships	Doha, Qatar	16th (q)	Triple jump	16.30 m
2010	Central American and Caribbean Games	Mayagüez, Puerto Rico	3rd	Triple jump	17.01 (wind: +0.3 m/s)
2011	Central American and Caribbean Championships	Mayagüez, Puerto Rico	1st	Triple jump	17.09 m (wind: -0.5 m/s)
2011	World Championships	Daegu, South Korea	19th (q)	Triple jump	16.38 m (wind: +0.1 m/s)
2011	Pan American Games	Guadalajara, Mexico	5th	Triple jump	16.39 m (wind: +1.4 m/s)
2012	World Indoor Championships	Istanbul, Turkey	13th (q)	Triple jump	16.06
2012	Olympic Games	London, United Kingdom	11th	Triple jump	16.65 m (wind: +0.8 m/s)
2013	World Championships	Moscow, Russia	11th	Triple jump	16.09 m (wind: -0.8 m/s)
2013	Jeux de la Francophonie	Nice, France	5th	Triple jump	16.43 m (wind: -0.5 m/s)
2014	World Indoor Championships	Sopot, Poland	10th (q)	Triple jump	16.13 m
2014	Pan American Sports Festival	Mexico City, Mexico	2nd	Triple jump	17.10 m A (wind: +0.2 m/s)
2014	Central American and Caribbean Games	Xalapa, Mexico	6th	Triple jump	16.08 m A (wind: -0.8 m/s)
2015	Pan American Games	Toronto, Canada	6th	Triple jump	16.43 m (wind: +0.8 m/s)
2015	2015 NACAC Championships in Athletics	San José, Costa Rica	4th	Triple jump	16.38 m (w)
2015	World Championships	Beijing, China	22nd (q)	Triple jump	16.23 m

== Personal bests ==
Event	Result	Venue	Date
Outdoor
Long jump	7.07 m (wind: +0.2 m/s)	Raleigh, United States	28 March 2008
Triple jump	17.39 m A (wind: +1.3 m/s)	Bogotá, Colombia	24 July 2009
Indoor
Long jump	7.18 m	Hanover, United States	25 February 2006
Triple jump	16.91 m	Fairfax, United States	27 February 2011

== Personal life ==
Laine currently trains and resides in the Washington, D.C. area and speaks fluent French. Laine is working on his Jump for Haiti Foundation, which will focus on mentoring Haitian children and developing more Haitian athletes.
