= Jean Rosa =

Brazilian triple jumper

Personal information
- Full name: Jean Cassemiro Rosa
- Born: 1 February 1990 (age 36)
- Education: Estácio de Sá University
- Height: 1.88 m (6 ft 2 in)
- Weight: 82 kg (181 lb)

Sport
- Country: Brazil
- Sport: Track and field
- Event: Triple jump
- Club: Rezende/Unimep-SP
- Updated on 29 August 2015

Jean Cassemiro Rosa (born 1 February 1990) is a triple jumper from Brazil. He competed at the 2015 World Championships in Beijing without qualifying for the final.

His personal best in the event is 16.80 metres (+1.3 m/s) set in São Bernardo do Campo in 2015.

== Competition record ==
Year	Competition	Venue	Position	Event	Notes
Representing Brazil
2009	South American Junior Championships	São Paulo, Brazil	1st	Triple jump	15.78 m
2009	Pan American Junior Championships	Port of Spain, Trinidad and Tobago	2nd	Triple jump	16.03 m
2010	South American Games / South American U23 Championships	Medellín, Colombia	2nd	Triple jump	16.22 m (w)
2012	South American U23 Championships	São Paulo, Brazil	2nd	Triple jump	15.68 m (w)
2015	South American Championships	Lima, Peru	5th	Triple jump	15.56 m
2015	Pan American Games	Toronto, Canada	14th	Triple jump	15.79 m
2015	World Championships	Beijing, China	26th (q)	Triple jump	15.97 m
2017	Universiade	Taipei, Taiwan	6th	Triple jump	16.42 m
