= Chris Carter (triple jumper) =

American triple jumper (born 1989)

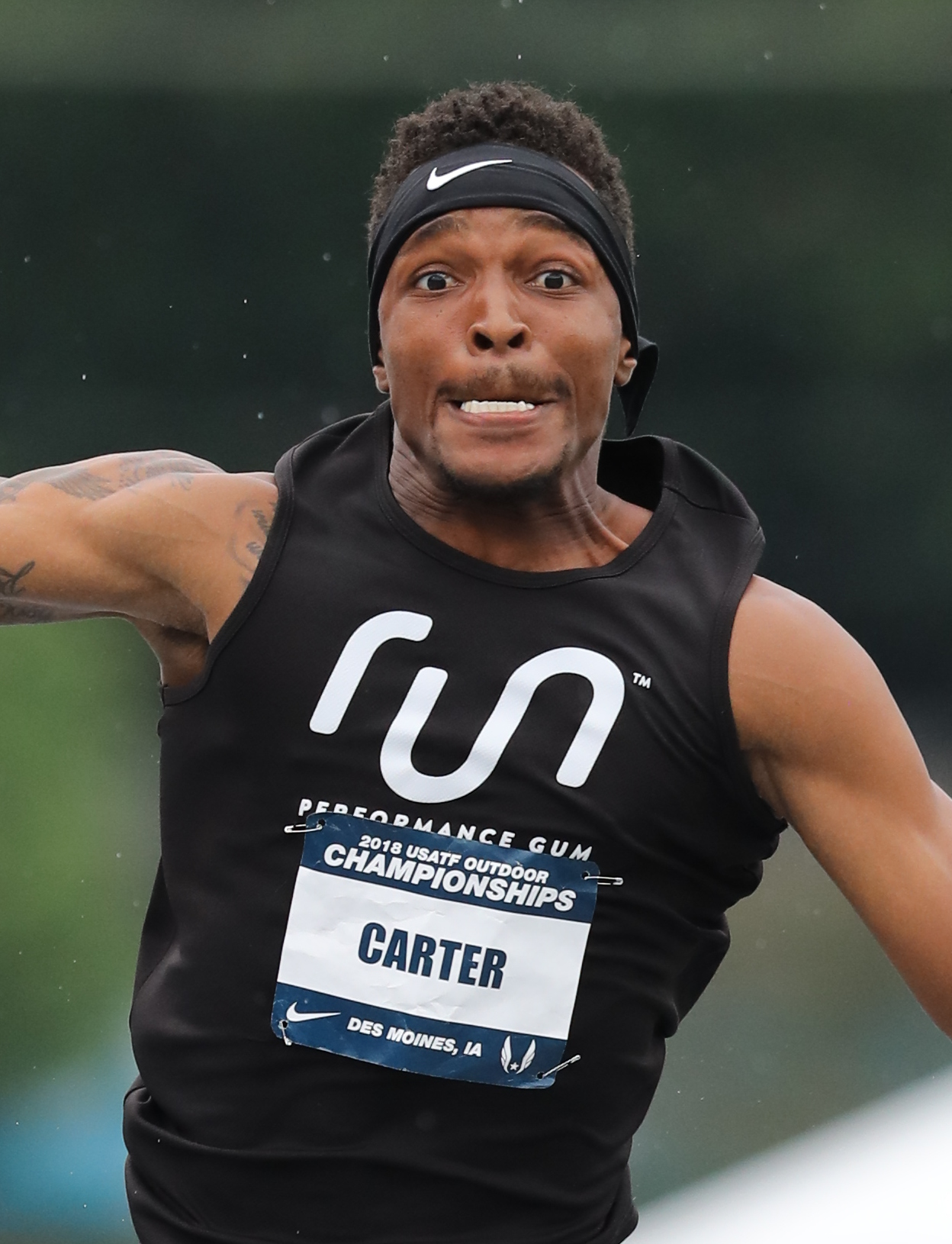
- Carter at the 2018 USA Outdoor Championships

Personal information
- Born: March 11, 1989 (age 37)

Sport
- Sport: Track and field
- Event: Triple jump

Chris Carter (born March 11, 1989) is an American track and field athlete who competes in the triple jump. He has a personal record of 17.15 m (56 ft 3 in) for the event, set in 2014. He was the 2014 USA Indoor Champion in the triple jump.

Carter represented his country at the 2011 Pan American Games and the 2014 IAAF World Indoor Championships, finishing sixth at both events. He competed collegiately for the Houston Cougars. He was a six-time Conference USA champion in the triple jump, as well as a two-time long jump champion.

== Career ==
=== Early life and college ===
Born in Austin, Texas to Sheila Phillips and Michael Carter, Chris Carter became involved in track and field sports at high school. Competing in horizontal jumps and hurdling events, he was the 2007 Texas State high school champion in the triple jump. That year he was the long jump winner at the Texas Relays and competed in both jumps at the AAU Junior Olympic Games, coming fifth in the long jump and winning the triple jump with an AAU record of 15.88 m (52 ft 1 in). He left high school with bests of 7.18 m (23 ft 6 1/2 in) for the long jump and 53.90 seconds for the 400-meter hurdles.

Set on collegiate competition, Carter chose to study at the University of Houston in recognition of its track and field facilities (Carl Lewis and Leroy Burrell were products of the college's Houston Cougars program). In his first academic year, he was triple jump winner and long jump fourth placer at the Conference USA indoor championship before going on to take third and second places at their outdoor championship. He focused more on jump the triple jump in 2009. That year he opened the indoor season with a personal record of 15.89 m (52 ft 1 1/2 in), but placed third at the Conference USA Indoors. Outdoors he jumped 16.34 m (53 ft 7 1/4 in) to take second place at the Texas Relays and won his first Conference USA outdoor title. He qualified for the final of the NCAA Men's Outdoor Track and Field Championship and placed tenth. He also entered the 2009 USA Outdoor Track and Field Championships, but only ranked 18th.

Carter was the 2010 Conference USA triple jump champion indoors and out. He also improved his long jumping, clearing 7.45 m (24 ft 5 1/4 in), and was conference runner-up indoors and fourth outdoors. He performed poorly at the NCAA Outdoors, however, managing only 15.07 m (49 ft 5 1/4 in) to finish 18th in the triple jump. His final year of collegiate competition was also his best. He won four Conference USA titles, taking a clean sweep of the horizontal jumps indoors and outdoors. A personal record jump of 16.70 m (54 ft 9 1/4 in) came in the triple jump at the NCAA Men's Indoor Track and Field Championship, bringing him fourth place in a highly competitive field. At the NCAA Outdoor Championship he competed in both jumps and placed 24th in the long jump and eighth in the triple jump.

=== Professional ===
The 2011 USA Outdoor Track and Field Championships saw Carter achieve a new personal record mark of 16.86 m (55 ft 3 3/4 in). This ranked him fourth behind Christian Taylor, Will Claye and Walter Davis. This performance earned him his first international selection and he ended the 2011 Pan American Games in sixth place. He struggled to capitalize on these progressions in the 2012 season – his best jump being 16.61 m (54 ft 5 3/4 in) for third at the Mt. SAC Relays. He was eliminated in qualifying at the 2012 United States Olympic Trials. He came fourth at the USA Indoor Track and Field Championships and the 2013 USA Outdoor Track and Field Championships, though this meant he did not receive a call-up to an international competition. He competed at the IAAF World Challenge Beijing and was the runner-up, setting his season's best mark of 16.69 m (54 ft 9 in) at the meet.

The 2014 USA Indoor Championships was the venue of his first national title in the triple jump, as he won the competition in a personal record mark of 17.15 m (56 ft 3 in). He was unable to clear seventeen meters at the 2014 IAAF World Indoor Championships, but managed sixth place in the final.

Carter now coaches at Atascocita High School in Humble, Texas as a Cross Country/Track and Field Coach.

== Personal records ==
- Triple jump outdoor – 16.86 m (55 ft 3 3/4 in) (2011)
- Triple jump indoor – 17.15 m (56 ft 3 in) (2014)
- Long jump outdoor – 7.67 m (25 ft 1 3/4 in) (2013)
- Long jump indoor – 7.50 m (24 ft 7 1/4 in) (2011)
- 400-meter hurdles – 53.90 seconds (2007)

== Competition record ==
Year	Competition	Venue	Position	Event	Notes
2011	Pan American Games	Guadalajara, Mexico	6th	Triple jump	16.21 m
2014	World Indoor Championships	Sopot, Poland	6th	Triple jump	16.74 m
2014	Pan American Sports Festival	Mexico City, Mexico	4th	Triple jump	16.50 m A (wind: 0.6 m/s)
2023	Pan American Games	Santiago, Chile	7th	Triple jump	15.67 m

National titles

- USA Indoor Track and Field Championships: 2014
