= 2014 IAAF World Indoor Championships – Men's triple jump =

The men's Triple jump at the 2014 IAAF World Indoor Championships took place on 8–9 March 2014.

== Medalists ==
Gold	Silver	Bronze
Ernesto Revé; Cuba	Pedro Pablo Pichardo; Cuba	Marian Oprea; Romania

== Records ==
Standing records prior to the 2014 IAAF World Indoor Championships
World record	Teddy Tamgho (FRA)	17.92	Paris, France	6 March 2011
Championship record	Teddy Tamgho (FRA)	17.90	Doha, Qatar	14 March 2010
World Leading	Pedro Pablo Pichardo (CUB)	17.32	Prague, Czech Republic	25 February 2014
African record	Ajayi Agbebaku (NGR)	17.00	Dallas, United States	30 January 1982
Asian record	Dong Bin (CHN)	17.16	Nanjing, China	7 March 2013
European record	Teddy Tamgho (FRA)	17.92	Paris, France	6 March 2011
North and Central American and Caribbean record	Aliecer Urrutia (CUB)	17.83	Sindelfingen, Germany	1 March 1997
Oceanian Record	Andrew Murphy (AUS)	17.20	Lisbon, Portugal	9 March 2001
South American record	Jadel Gregório (BRA)	17.56	Moscow, Russia	12 March 2006
Records broken during the 2014 IAAF World Indoor Championships
World Leading	Ernesto Revé (CUB)	17.33	Sopot, Poland	9 March 2014

== Qualification standards ==
Indoor	Outdoor
17.00

== Schedule ==
Date	Time	Round
8 March 2014	10:05	Qualification
9 March 2014	17:10	Final

== Results ==
=== Qualification ===
Qualification: 16.90 (Q) or at least 8 best performers (q) qualified for the final.

Rank	Athlete	Nationality	#1	#2	#3	Result	Notes
1	Marian Oprea	Romania	16.68	17.02		17.02	Q
2	Pedro Pablo Pichardo	Cuba	16.76	16.82	–	16.82	q
3	Lyukman Adams	Russia	16.31	16.47	16.68	16.68	q
4	Ernesto Revé	Cuba	16.55	16.13	–	16.55	q
5	Chris Carter	United States	16.51	16.50	16.54	16.54	q
6	Cao Shuo	China	16.11	x	16.47	16.47	q, SB
7	Karol Hoffmann	Poland	16.09	16.31	16.37	16.37	q
8	Viktor Kuznyetsov	Ukraine	15.88	16.19	16.29	16.29	q
9	Roman Valiyev	Kazakhstan	16.22	16.12	x	16.22	SB
10	Samyr Lainé	Haiti	16.13	15.85	16.07	16.13	
11	Vladimir Letnicov	Moldova	15.83	x	x	15.83	
	Dong Bin	China				DNS	

=== Final ===
Rank	Athlete	Nationality	#1	#2	#3	#4	#5	#6	Result	Notes
1st place, gold medalist(s)	Ernesto Revé	Cuba	15.78	17.33	x	–	–	–	17.33	
2nd place, silver medalist(s)	Pedro Pablo Pichardo	Cuba	16.73	x	16.73	16.81	17.18	17.24	17.24	
3rd place, bronze medalist(s)	Marian Oprea	Romania	17.02	16.34	x	x	16.46	17.21	17.21	
4	Karol Hoffmann	Poland	x	x	16.89	16.47	16.42	x	16.89	SB
5	Chris Carter	United States	16.54	x	16.74	16.71	16.72	16.55	16.74	
6	Cao Shuo	China	15.90	15.68	16.13	16.15	15.88	16.55	16.55	SB
7	Viktor Kuznyetsov	Ukraine	15.78	16.51	16.39	16.22	x	16.34	16.51	
	Lyukman Adams	Russia	x	17.21	x	x	17.17	17.37	17.37	DQ
