= 2020 Russian Indoor Athletics Championships =

- Edition: 29th
- Dates: 25–27 February
- Host city: Moscow
- Venue: Alexander Gomelsky Universal Sports Hall CSKA
- Events: 24

The 2020 Russian Indoor Athletics Championships was the 29th edition of the annual indoor track and field competition, which serves as the Russian national indoor championship for the sport. A total of 24 events (divided evenly between the sexes) were contested over three days from 13–15 February at the Alexander Gomelsky Universal Sports Hall CSKA in Moscow.

The Russian Ministry of Sport suspended the Russian Athletics Federation (RusAF) for one month on 31 January due ARAF officials obstructing in international anti-doping investigations into Danil Lysenko. As a result, RusAF did not organise the national championships and the Ministry of Sport managed this directly. Due to ongoing international sanctions for doping against the Russian governing body, the competition did not serve as a selection meet for the 2020 World Athletics Indoor Championships.

In addition to the main track and field championship, national championships for combined track and field events were held from 16–18 February in Kirov.

== Results ==
=== Men ===
Event	Gold		Silver		Bronze	
60 metres	Dmitriy Khomutov; Krasnodar Krai	6.70	Ruslan Perestyuk; Krasnodar Krai	6.71	Dmitriy Lopin; Krasnodar Krai/Samara Oblast	6.72
400 metres	Mikhail Filatov; Saint Petersburg	47.11	Andrey Kukharenko; Saint Petersburg	47.16	Maksim Fedyaev; Moscow Oblast/Kursk Oblast	47.44
800 metres	Konstantin Kholmogorov; Moscow/Perm Krai	1:48.56	Nikolay Verbitskiy; Moscow Oblast/Buryatia	1:49.38	Sergey Dubrovskiy; Moscow Oblast/Belgorod Oblast	1:49.66
1500 metres	Konstantin Plokhotnikov; Krasnodar Krai	3:44.70	Nikolay Gorin; Moscow/Mordovia	3:44.72	Evgeniy Kunts; Moscow/Altai Krai	3:45.01
3000 metres	Vladimir Nikitin; Moscow/Perm Krai	7:48.15	Anatoliy Rybakov; Kemerovo Oblast	7:54.78	Yevgeny Rybakov; Kemerovo Oblast	7:54.86
60 m hurdles	Konstantin Shabanov; Moscow/Pskov Oblast	7.67	Semen Manakov; Tatarstan	7.85	Sergey Solodov; Saint Petersburg	7.85
High jump	Ilya Ivanyuk; Bryansk Oblast/Smolensk Oblast	2.33 m	Nikita Anishchenkov; Moscow/Chelyabinsk Oblast	2.28 m	Mikhail Akimenko; Moscow/Kabardino-Balkaria	2.24 m
Pole vault	Timur Morgunov; Chelyabinsk Oblast/Moscow Oblast	5.65 m	Georgiy Gorokhov; Moscow/Bryansk Oblast	5.55 m	Ilya Mudrov; Moscow Oblast/Yaroslavl Oblast	5.55 m
Long jump	Anatoliy Ryapolov; Krasnodar Krai	8.01 m	Artem Primak; Krasnodar Krai/Khabarovsk Krai	7.93 m	Fedor Kiselkov; Moscow Oblast/Primorsky Krai	7.82 m
Triple jump	Dmitriy Chizhikov; Moscow	16.77 m	Denis Obertyshev; Krasnodar Krai/Samara Oblast	16.60 m	Aleksandr Yurchenko; Moscow Oblast/Samara Oblast	16.56 m
Shot put	Maksim Afonin; Moscow/Moscow Oblast	20.62 m	Pavel Derkach; Moscow/Nizhny Novgorod Oblast	20.47 m	Maksim Sidorov; Moscow Oblast	20.08 m
4 × 400 m relay	Saint Petersburg; Maksim Rafilovich; Andrey Kukharenko; Konstantin Prokofev; Mikhail Filatov	3:09.28	Moscow; Dmitriy Efimov; Andrey Efremov; Ivan Loginov; Fedor Ivanov	3:11.84	Moscow Oblast; Egor Filippov; Vladimir Lysenko; Sergey Dubrovskiy; Leonid Karasev	3:11.87

=== Women ===
Event	Gold		Silver		Bronze	
60 metres	Kristina Makarenko; Moscow	7.09	Kristina Khorosheva; Penza Oblast/Tula Oblast	7.44	Olesya Soldatova; Krasnodar Krai	7.45
400 metres	Antonina Krivoshapka; Moscow/Volgograd Oblast	52.02	Polina Miller; Krasnodar Krai/Altai Krai	52.39	Ekaterina Renzhina; Moscow/Tula Oblast	52.44
800 metres	Aleksandra Gulyaeva; Moscow/Ivanovo Oblast	2:01.83	Svetlana Uloga; Tatarstan	2:04.14	Yekaterina Kupina; Kursk Oblast	2:05.13
1500 metres	Yelena Korobkina; Moscow/Lipetsk Oblast	4:10.62	Anna Schagina; Moscow	4:11.88	Dina Aleksandrova; Kursk Oblast	4:13.04
3000 metres	Yelena Korobkina; Moscow/Lipetsk Oblast	8:50.99	Anna Schagina; Moscow	8:52.53	Ekaterina Ivonina; Moscow Oblast/Perm Krai	8:55.56
60 m hurdles	Anastasiya Nikolaeva; Moscow Oblast/Samara Oblast	8.19	Anna Vatropina; Tatarstan	8.35	Mariya Aglitskaya; Moscow	8.35
High jump	Mariya Lasitskene; Moscow Oblast/Kabardino-Balkaria	2.00 m	Anna Chicherova; Moscow/Rostov Oblast	1.91 m	Kristina Koroleva; Lipetsk Oblast/Kemerovo Oblast	1.88 m
Pole vault	Anzhelika Sidorova; Moscow/Chuvashia	4.92 m	Polina Knoroz; Moscow/Saint Petersburg	4.65 m	Angelina Zhuk-Krasnova; Moscow/Irkutsk Oblast	4.60 m
Long jump	Yelena Sokolova; Moscow/Belgorod Oblast	6.48 m	Yuliya Pidluzhnaya; Sverdlovsk Oblast	6.42 m	Veronika Semashko; Saint Petersburg	6.41 m
Triple jump	Natalya Yevdokimova; Moscow	14.16 m	Ekaterina Koneva; Krasnodar Krai/Khabarovsk Krai	14.13 m	Valentina Kosolapova; Volgograd Oblast/Moscow	13.85 m
Shot put	Anna Avdeyeva; Samara Oblast	17.50 m	Alena Gordeeva; Moscow/Tver Oblast	17.09 m	Evgeniya Soloveva; Moscow Oblast/Chelyabinsk Oblast	16.93 m
4 × 400 m relay	Saint Petersburg; Kseniya Mosolova; Polina Kondrashova; Lyubov Semenova; Vera Alymova	3:38.75	Moscow; Anna Popova; Viktoriya Tsyganova; Darya Tikhonova; Ekaterina Vakhrusheva	3:38.83	Novosibirsk Oblast; Aleksandra Timofeeva; Olga Palienko; Kseniya Rudenko; Anastasiya Bragina	3:39.04

== Russian Combined Events Championships ==
=== Men ===
Event	Gold		Silver		Bronze	
Heptathlon	Artem Makarenko; Moscow/Krasnoyarsk Krai	6320 pts	Sergey Timshin; Moscow/Lipetsk Oblast	5794 pts	Stepan Kekin; Moscow/Omsk Oblast	5757 pts

=== Women ===
Event	Gold		Silver		Bronze	
Pentathlon	Aleksandra Butvina; Rostov Oblast/Saint Petersburg	4259 pts	Marina Pshichkina; Moscow/Penza Oblast	4201 pts	Anastasiya Nikolaeva; Moscow Oblast/Samara Oblast	3999 pts
