= Maximiliano Díaz (athlete) =

Argentine athletics competitor

Personal information
- Born: 15 November 1988 (age 37)

Sport
- Sport: Track and field
- Event(s): Triple jump Long jump

Maximiliano Andrés Díaz (born 15 November 1988) is an Argentine athlete specialising in the triple jump. He represented his country at the 2011 World Championships without qualifying for the final. In addition, he twice won gold at the South American Championships, in 2011 and 2019.

His personal best in the event is 16.51 metres (+1.2 m/s, Buenos Aires 2011). This is the current national record.

== Competition record ==
Year	Competition	Venue	Position	Event	Notes
Representing Argentina
2009	South American Championships	Lima, Peru	3rd	Triple jump	15.49 m
2010	South American Games / South American U23 Championships	Medellín, Colombia	5th	4 × 400 m relay	3:16.31
2010	South American Games / South American U23 Championships	Medellín, Colombia	5th	Long jump	7.32 m
2010	South American Games / South American U23 Championships	Medellín, Colombia	4th	Triple jump	15.74 m
2010	Ibero-American Championships	San Fernando, Spain	12th	Long jump	6.81 m
2010	Ibero-American Championships	San Fernando, Spain	6th	Triple jump	15.60 m
2011	South American Championships	Buenos Aires, Argentina	7th	Long jump	7.26 m
2011	South American Championships	Buenos Aires, Argentina	1st	Triple jump	16.51 m
2011	World Championships	Daegu, South Korea	26th (q)	Triple jump	15.91 m
2011	Pan American Games	Guadalajara, Mexico	4th	Triple jump	16.47 m
2012	Ibero-American Championships	Barquisimeto, Venezuela	10th	Triple jump	14.83 m
2013	South American Championships	Cartagena, Colombia	7th	Triple jump	14.98 m
2014	South American Games	Medellín, Colombia	6th	Triple jump	15.39 m
2015	South American Championships	Lima, Peru	6th	Triple jump	15.36 m
2016	Ibero-American Championships	Rio de Janeiro, Brazil	5th	Triple jump	15.31 m
2017	South American Championships	Asunción, Paraguay	5th	Triple jump	15.82 m (w)
2018	South American Games	Cochabamba, Bolivia	5th	Triple jump	15.74 m
2018	Ibero-American Championships	Trujillo, Peru	4th	Triple jump	15.90 m
2019	South American Championships	Lima, Peru	1st	Triple jump	16.23 m
2019	Pan American Games	Lima, Peru	10th	Triple jump	15.97 m
2020	South American Indoor Championships	Cochabamba, Bolivia	2nd	4 × 400 m relay	3:29.45
2020	South American Indoor Championships	Cochabamba, Bolivia	3rd	Triple jump	16.52 m
2021	South American Championships	Guayaquil, Ecuador	4th	Triple jump	16.20 m
2022	South American Indoor Championships	Cochabamba, Bolivia	4th	Triple jump	16.02 m
2022	Ibero-American Championships	La Nucía, Spain	7th	Triple jump	16.01 m
2023	South American Championships	São Paulo, Brazil	8th	Triple jump	15.86 m
2024	South American Indoor Championships	Cochabamba, Bolivia	3rd	Triple jump	16.00 m
2024	Ibero-American Championships	Cuiabá, Brazil	8th	Triple jump	15.89 m
2025	South American Indoor Championships	Cochabamba, Bolivia	6th	Triple jump	15.79 m
