= Lathone Collie-Minns =

Bahamian triple jumper

Personal information
- Full name: Lathone Collie-Minns
- Born: 10 March 1994 (age 32) Nassau, Bahamas
- Height: 1.73 m (5 ft 8 in)
- Weight: 64 kg (141 lb)

Sport
- Country: Bahamas
- Sport: Athletics
- Event: Triple jump
- College team: Texas A&M University

Achievements and titles
- Personal best: Triple jump: 16.99 (2019)
Medal record
Men's athletics
Representing Bahamas
World Youth Championships
Bronze medal – third place	2011 Lille	Triple jump
CAC Junior Championships (Junior)
Silver medal – second place	2012 San Salvador	Triple jump
CAC Junior Championships (Youth)
Gold medal – first place	2010 Santo Domingo	Triple jump
CARIFTA Games (Junior)
Silver medal – second place	2012 Hamilton	Triple jump
CARIFTA Games (Youth)
Gold medal – first place	2010 George Town	Triple jump
Silver medal – second place	2009 Vieux Fort	Triple jump
Silver medal – second place	2010 George Town	Long jump

Lathone Collie-Minns (born March 10, 1994) is a Bahamian triple jumper. Lathone won the bronze medal at the 2011 World Youth Championships in Lille, France. Collie-Minns competed at the 2019 World Athletics Championships in Doha. Lathone competed for Texas A&M University.

Collie-Minns has a twin brother named Latario Collie-Minns, who he finished behind for bronze medal in the triple jump at the 2011 World Youth Championships.
