= Athletics at the 2011 Pan American Games – Men's triple jump =

Men's triple jump at the 2011 Pan American Games
- Venue: Telmex Athletics Stadium
- Dates: October 27
- Competitors: 10 from 7 nations
- Winning distance: 17.21

Medalists
Gold medal	Alexis Copello	Cuba
Silver medal	Yoandri Betanzos	Cuba
Bronze medal	Jefferson Sabino	Brazil

The men's triple jump event of the athletics events at the 2011 Pan American Games was held the 27 of October at the Telmex Athletics Stadium. The defending Pan American Games champion is Jadel Gregório of the Brazil.

== Records ==
Prior to this competition, the existing world and Pan American Games records were as follows:

World record	Jonathan Edwards (GBR)	18.29	Gothenburg, Sweden	August 7, 1995
Pan American Games record	João Carlos de Oliveira (BRA)	17.89	Mexico City, Mexico	October 15, 1975

== Qualification ==
Each National Olympic Committee (NOC) was able to enter up to two entrants providing they had met the minimum standard (16.60) in the qualifying period (January 1, 2010 to September 14, 2011).

== Schedule ==
Date	Time	Round
October 27, 2011	15:20	Final

== Results ==
All distances shown are in meters:centimeters

KEY:	q	Fastest non-qualifiers	Q	Qualified	NR	National record	PB	Personal best	SB	Seasonal best

=== Final ===
The final was held on October 27.

Rank	Athlete	Nationality	#1	#2	#3	#4	#5	#6	Result	Notes
1st place, gold medalist(s)	Alexis Copello	Cuba	17.21	x	16.44	–	14.98	–	17.21	
2nd place, silver medalist(s)	Yoandri Betanzos	Cuba	x	15.59	16.11	x	16.36	16.54	16.54	
3rd place, bronze medalist(s)	Jefferson Sabino	Brazil	16.29	x	16.51	x	x	x	16.51	
4	Maximiliano Díaz	Argentina	16.47	16.18	16.08	x	16.03	15.70	16.47	
5	Samyr Lainé	Haiti	16.39	15.86	x	15.83	x	16.08	16.39	
6	Chris Carter	United States	16.21	x	15.63	15.81	x	16.08	16.21	
7	Alberto Álvarez	Mexico	x	15.72	15.96	16.05	16.20	16.15	16.20	PB
8	Zedric Thomas	United States	16.14	x	15.79	15.86	16.15	16.19	16.19	
9	Muhammad Halim	Virgin Islands	15.94	15.92	15.63				15.94	
10	Jair Adenas	Mexico	x	15.72	15.59				15.72	
