= Clive Pullen =

Jamaican triple jumper

Personal information
- Born: 18 October 1994 (age 31)
- Education: University of Arkansas
- Height: 1.83 m (6 ft 0 in)
- Weight: 83 kg (183 lb)

Sport
- Sport: Athletics
- Event: Triple jump
- College team: Arkansas Razorbacks

Clive Pullen (born 18 October 1994) is a Jamaican athlete specialising in the triple jump. He represented his country at the 2016 Summer Olympics without qualifying for the final.

His personal bests in the event are 16.90 metres outdoors (+1.9 m/s 2016) and 17.19 metres indoors (Fayetteville 2017).

== International competitions ==
Year	Competition	Venue	Position	Event	Notes
Representing Jamaica
2010	CARIFTA Games (U17)	George Town, Cayman Islands	1st	Long jump	6.72 m
2010	Central American and Caribbean; Junior Championships (U17)	Santo Domingo, Dominican Republic	3rd	Long jump	6.74 m
2010	Central American and Caribbean; Junior Championships (U17)	Santo Domingo, Dominican Republic	7th	Triple jump	13.69 m
2011	CARIFTA Games (U20)	Montego Bay, Jamaica	2nd	Long jump	7.15 m
2011	World Youth Championships	Lille, France	9th	Long jump	7.19 m
2012	Central American and Caribbean; Junior Championships (U20)	San Salvador, El Salvador	1st	Long jump	7.20 m
2012	Central American and Caribbean; Junior Championships (U20)	San Salvador, El Salvador	4th	Triple jump	15.65 m
2012	World Junior Championships	Barcelona, Spain	9th	Triple jump	15.79 m
2013	CARIFTA Games (U20)	Nassau, Bahamas	2nd	Long jump	7.38 m (w)
2013	CARIFTA Games (U20)	Nassau, Bahamas	1st	Triple jump	15.44 m
2016	Olympic Games	Rio de Janeiro, Brazil	33rd (q)	Triple jump	16.08 m
2017	World Championships	London, United Kingdom	30th (q)	Triple jump	15.61 m
2018	World Indoor Championships	Birmingham, United Kingdom	13th	Triple jump	16.13 m
2018	Commonwealth Games	Gold Coast, Australia	7th	Triple jump	16.25 m
2019	Pan American Games	Lima, Peru	5th	Triple jump	16.35 m
