= Lasha Gulelauri =

Georgian triple jumper (born 1993)

Personal information
- Born: 26 May 1993 (age 33) Akhmeta, Georgia
- Height: 1.84 m (6 ft 0 in)
- Weight: 76 kg (168 lb)

Sport
- Sport: Athletics
- Event: Triple jump

Lasha Gulelauri (Georgian: ლაშა თორღვაიძე; born 26 May 1993) is a Georgian athlete specialising in the triple jump. He represented his country at the 2016 Summer Olympics without having a recording mark in the qualification round.

His personal bests in the event are 16.87 metres outdoors (+0.9 m/s, Almaty 2016) and 16.62 metres indoors (Tbilisi 2016).

== International competitions ==
Year	Competition	Venue	Position	Event	Notes
Representing Georgia
2011	European Youth Olympic Festival	Trabzon, Turkey	2nd	Triple jump	15.49 m
2012	World Junior Championships	Barcelona, Spain	6th	Triple jump	16.00 m
2013	European Indoor Championships	Gothenburg, Sweden	20th (q)	Triple jump	15.35 m
2015	European Indoor Championships	Prague, Czech Republic	15th (q)	Triple jump	15.97 m
2015	European U23 Championships	Tallinn, Estonia	4th	Triple jump	16.33 m
2016	European Championships	Amsterdam, Netherlands	16th (q)	Triple jump	16.32 m
2016	Olympic Games	Rio de Janeiro, Brazil	–	Triple jump	NM
2018	Championships of the Small States of Europe	Schaan, Liechtenstein	2nd	Long jump	7.67 m (w)
2018	European Championships	Berlin, Germany	–	Triple jump	NM
2021	Olympic Games	Tokyo, Japan	–	Triple jump	NM
2026	European Championships	Birmingham, United Kingdom	23rd (q)	Triple jump	15.39 m
