= Latario Collie-Minns =

Bahamian triple jumper (born 1994)

Personal information
- Full name: Latario Collie-Minns
- Born: 10 March 1994 (age 32) Nassau, Bahamas
- Height: 1.73 m (5 ft 8 in)
- Weight: 64 kg (141 lb)

Sport
- Country: Bahamas
- Sport: Athletics
- Event: Triple jump
- College team: Texas A&M University

Achievements and titles
- Personal best: Triple jump: 17.18 (2015)
- Updated on 29 August 2015

Latario Collie-Minns (born March 10, 1994) is a Bahamian triple jumper. He won the gold medal at the 2011 World Youth Championships in Lille, France, and eventually represented his nation Bahamas at the 2016 Summer Olympics, scratching all three of his jumps in the preliminary round. In his college career, Collie-Minns established history as the fifth Bahamian to capture the NCAA men's triple jump title for the Texas A&M Aggies.

Collie-Minns competed for the Bahamas in the men's triple jump at the 2016 Summer Olympics in Rio de Janeiro. Leading up to his maiden Games, he popped a personal best of 17.18 m to successfully eclipse the IAAF Olympic entry standard (16.85) at the 2015 Southeastern Conference Track & Field Championships in Starkville, Mississippi, United States. Collie-Minns could not get down a legal mark in each of the three available attempts during the qualifying phase of the competition, failing to advance further to the final round.

Collie-Minns has a twin brother named Lathone, who finished behind him for the silver medal in the triple jump at the 2011 World Youth Championships.

== Competition record ==
Year	Competition	Venue	Position	Event	Notes
Representing the Bahamas
2009	CARIFTA Games (U17)	Vieux Fort, Saint Lucia	3rd	Triple jump	14.39 m
2010	CARIFTA Games (U17)	George Town, Cayman Islands	7th	Long jump	6.46 m
2010	CARIFTA Games (U17)	George Town, Cayman Islands	2nd	Triple jump	14.78 m
2010	Central American and Caribbean; Junior Championships (U17)	Santo Domingo, Dominican Republic	–	Long jump	NM
2010	Central American and Caribbean; Junior Championships (U17)	Santo Domingo, Dominican Republic	2nd	Triple jump	15.05 m
2010	World Junior Championships	Moncton, Canada	16th (q)	Triple jump	15.35 m
2011	World Youth Championships	Lille, France	1st	Triple jump	16.06 m
2011	Pan American Junior Championships	Miramar, United States	3rd	Triple jump	15.93 m
2012	CARIFTA Games (U20)	Hamilton, Bermuda	1st	Triple jump	16.35 m
2012	World Junior Championships	Barcelona, Spain	3rd	Triple jump	16.37 m
2015	Pan American Games	Toronto, Canada	10th	Triple jump	16.08 m
2015	World Championships	Beijing, China	23rd (q)	Triple jump	16.21 m
2016	Olympic Games	Rio de Janeiro, Brazil	–	Triple jump	NM
2018	Commonwealth Games	Gold Coast, Australia	11th	Triple jump	15.90 m
2019	Pan American Games	Lima, Peru	–	Triple jump	NM
2019	World Championships	Doha, Qatar	28th (q)	Triple jump	16.26 m
