= Gaëtan Saku Bafuanga Baya =

French triple jumper

Gaëtan Saku Bafuanga
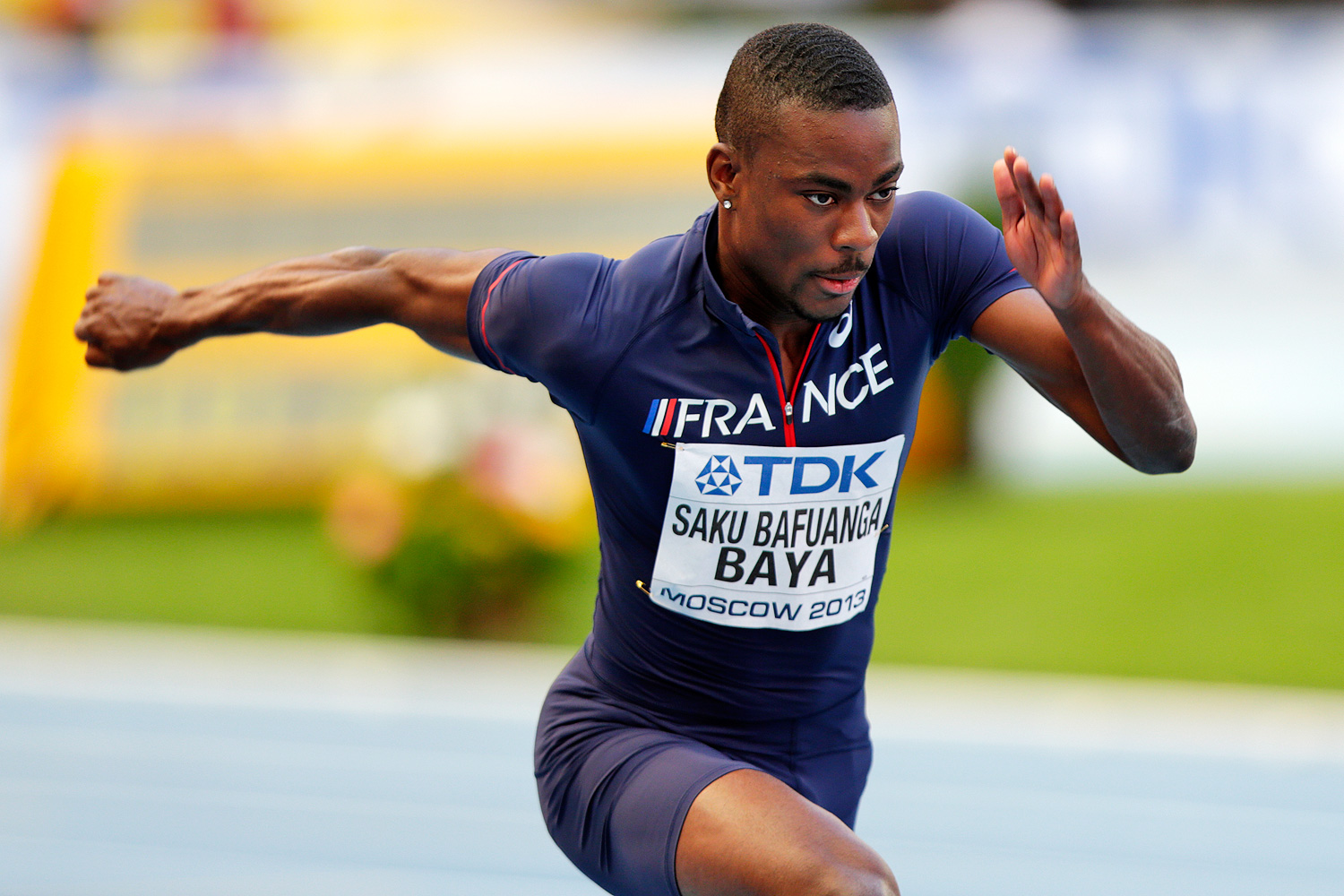
- 2013 World Championships

Personal information
- Full name: Gaëtan Saku Bafuanga Baya
- Born: 22 July 1991 (age 35) Nanterre, France
- Height: 181 cm (5 ft 11 in)
- Weight: 75 kg (165 lb)

Sport
- Country: France
- Sport: Athletics (track and field)
- Event: Triple jump

Gaëtan Saku Bafuanga Baya (born 22 July 1991) is a French triple jumper.

== 2013 World Championships ==
Baya competed at the 2013 World Championships in Athletics where he advanced to the finals of the triple jump. Baya was the last qualifier (12th place) from the qualification round, where he tied with Renjith Maheshwary of India with a jump of 16.63m. Baya advanced on a tiebreaker since his 2nd farthest jump (16.37m) was 9 centimeters better than that of Maheshwary (16.28m). In the finals Baya's best jump was 16.79m in his second opening jump finishing seventh in the opening part of the finals. The top 8 after the first three jumps are able to jump three more times, but Baya was unable to beat his mark of 16.79m and ultimately finished in 7th place.
