= José Adrián Sornoza =

Ecuadorian triple jumper

Jose Adrian
Personal information
- National team: Ecuador
- Born: 5 August 1992 (age 33) Portoviejo, Ecuador
- Height: 176 cm (5 ft 9 in)
- Weight: 66 kg (146 lb; 10 st 6 lb)

Sport
- Country: Ecuador
- Sport: Triple jump

José Adrián Sornoza (born 5 August 1992 in Portoviejo) is an Ecuadorian triple jumper. He competed in the triple jump event at the 2012 Summer Olympics.
