= 1971 European Athletics Championships – Men's long jump =

Men's long jump at the European Athletics Championships

The men's long jump at the 1971 European Athletics Championships was held in Helsinki, Finland, at Helsinki Olympic Stadium on 10 and 11 August 1971.

== Medalists ==
Gold	Max Klauß; East Germany
Silver	Igor Ter-Ovanesyan; Soviet Union
Bronze	Stanisław Szudrowicz; Poland

== Results ==
=== Final ===
11 August

Rank	Name	Nationality	Result	Notes
1st place, gold medalist(s)	Max Klauß	East Germany	7.92 (w: 0.1 m/s)	
2nd place, silver medalist(s)	Igor Ter-Ovanesyan	Soviet Union	7.91 w (w: 2.3 m/s)	
3rd place, bronze medalist(s)	Stanisław Szudrowicz	Poland	7.87 (w: 0.1 m/s)	
4	Lynn Davies	Great Britain	7.85	
5	Mauri Myllymäki	Finland	7.85 (w: 1 m/s)	
6	Reijo Toivonen	Finland	7.85 (w: 0.1 m/s)	
7	Tõnu Lepik	Soviet Union	7.78	
8	Jan Kobuszewski	Poland	7.75 (w: 0.9 m/s)	
9	Christian Tourret	France	7.74 (w: 0.5 m/s)	
10	Valeriy Podluzhniy	Soviet Union	7.68 (w: 1.1 m/s)	
11	Jacques Rousseau	France	7.56 (w: 0.9 m/s)	
12	Josef Schwarz	West Germany	7.50	
13	Terje Haugland	Norway	7.41 (w: 0.7 m/s)	
14	Finn Bendixen	Norway	7.32 (w: 0.7 m/s)	
15	Vasile Sărucan	Romania	6.05 (w: 0.9 m/s)	

=== Qualification ===
10 August

Rank	Name	Nationality	Result	Notes
1	Tõnu Lepik	Soviet Union	7.93	Q
2	Lynn Davies	Great Britain	7.90	Q
3	Christian Tourret	France	7.82	Q
4	Jacques Rousseau	France	7.82	Q
5	Josef Schwarz	West Germany	7.80	Q
6	Vasile Sărucan	Romania	7.79	Q
7	Igor Ter-Ovanesyan	Soviet Union	7.77	Q
8	Jan Kobuszewski	Poland	7.77	Q
9	Reijo Toivonen	Finland	7.77	Q
10	Terje Haugland	Norway	7.75	Q
11	Stanisław Szudrowicz	Poland	7.75	Q
12	Finn Bendixen	Norway	7.74	Q
13	Max Klauß	East Germany	7.72	Q
14	Valeriy Podluzhniy	Soviet Union	7.72	Q
15	Mauri Myllymäki	Finland	7.70	Q
16	Klaus Beer	East Germany	7.65	
17	Hans Baumgartner	West Germany	7.62	
18	Dušan Košutić	Yugoslavia	7.60	
19	Miljenko Rak	Yugoslavia	7.58	
20	Andreas Gloerfeld	West Germany	7.57	
21	Jesper Tørring	Denmark	7.52	
22	Valeriu Jurcă	Romania	7.50	
23	Jacques Pani	France	7.41	
24	Nenad Stekić	Yugoslavia	7.35	
25	Gürol Dinsel	Turkey	7.27	
26	Geoff Hignett	Great Britain	7.25	
27	Henrik Kalocsai	Hungary	7.24	
28	Gábor Katona	Hungary	7.22	
29	Jaroslav Brož	Czechoslovakia	5.92	
	Alan Lerwill	Great Britain	NM	

== Participation ==
According to an unofficial count, 30 athletes from 14 countries participated in the event.

- Czechoslovakia (1)
- Denmark (1)
- East Germany (2)
- Finland (2)
- France (3)
- Hungary (2)
- Norway (2)
- Poland (2)
- Romania (2)
- Soviet Union (3)
- Turkey (1)
- Great Britain (3)
- West Germany (3)
- Yugoslavia (3)
