= 1969 European Athletics Championships – Men's long jump =

Men's long jump at the European Athletics Championships

The men's long jump at the 1969 European Athletics Championships was held in Athens, Greece, at Georgios Karaiskakis Stadium on 17 and 18 September 1969.

== Medalists ==
Gold	Igor Ter-Ovanesyan; Soviet Union
Silver	Lynn Davies; Great Britain
Bronze	Tõnu Lepik; Soviet Union

== Results ==
=== Final ===
18 September

Rank	Name	Nationality	Result	Wind	
1st place, gold medalist(s)	Igor Ter-Ovanesyan	Soviet Union	8.17 w	+4.4	
2nd place, silver medalist(s)	Lynn Davies	Great Britain	8.07 w	+2.2	
3rd place, bronze medalist(s)	Tõnu Lepik	Soviet Union	8.04 w	+4.2	
4	Klaus Beer	East Germany	8.03 w	+3.2	
5	Leonid Barkovskyy	Soviet Union	8.02 w	+2.4	
6	Max Klauß	East Germany	8.00	+0.8	CR
7	Jacques Pani	France	7.87 w	+2.6	
8	Gérard Ugolini	France	7.87	+0.8	
9	Christian Tourret	France	7.82 w	+3.0	
10	Nenad Stekić	Yugoslavia	7.78 w	+2.3	
11	Terje Haugland	Norway	7.58 w	+2.8	
12	Jesper Tørring	Denmark	7.41	+1.8	
13	Vasile Sărucan	Romania	7.34	+1.2	

=== Qualification ===
17 September

Rank	Name	Nationality	Result	Notes
1	Igor Ter-Ovanesyan	Soviet Union	7.87	Q
2	Klaus Beer	East Germany	7.82	Q
3	Leonid Barkovskyy	Soviet Union	7.79	Q
4	Vasile Sărucan	Romania	7.66	Q
5	Lynn Davies	Great Britain	7.64	Q
6	Christian Tourret	France	7.58	Q
7	Gérard Ugolini	France	7.57	Q
8	Jacques Pani	France	7.56	Q
9	Tõnu Lepik	Soviet Union	7.54	Q
10	Max Klauß	East Germany	7.53	Q
11	Terje Haugland	Norway	7.35	Q
12	Jesper Tørring	Denmark	7.35	Q
13	Nenad Stekić	Yugoslavia	7.35	Q
14	Zdzisław Kokot	Poland	7.30	
15	Stanisław Cabaj	Poland	7.27	
16	Finn Bendixen	Norway	7.27	
17	Hannu Kyösola	Finland	7.24	
18	Mihail Zaharia	Romania	7.23	
19	Waldemar Stępień	Poland	7.23	
20	Rafael Blanquer	Spain	7.22	
21	Alan Lerwill	Great Britain	7.20	
22	Miljenko Rak	Yugoslavia	7.15	
23	Lars-Olof Höök	Sweden	7.13	
24	Philippe Houssiaux	Belgium	7.07	
25	Pertti Pousi	Finland	6.81	

== Participation ==
According to an unofficial count, 25 athletes from 13 countries participated in the event.

- Belgium (1)
- Denmark (1)
- East Germany (2)
- Finland (2)
- France (3)
- Norway (2)
- Poland (3)
- Romania (2)
- Soviet Union (3)
- Spain (1)
- Sweden (1)
- Great Britain (2)
- Yugoslavia (2)
