= 1970 European Athletics Indoor Championships – Men's long jump =

The men's long jump event at the 1970 European Athletics Indoor Championships was held on 15 March in Vienna.

== Results ==
Rank	Name	Nationality	Result	Notes
1st place, gold medalist(s)	Tõnu Lepik	Soviet Union	8.05	NR
2nd place, silver medalist(s)	Klaus Beer	East Germany	7.99	
3rd place, bronze medalist(s)	Rafael Blanquer	Spain	7.92	
4	Hermann Latzel	West Germany	7.91	
5	Igor Ter-Ovanesyan	Soviet Union	7.89	
6	Henrik Kalocsai	Hungary	7.73	
7	Vasile Sărucan	Romania	7.69	
8	Leonid Barkovskyy	Soviet Union	7.68	
9	Christian Tourret	France	7.66	
10	Alan Lerwill	Great Britain	7.64	
11	Lars-Olof Höök	Sweden	7.52	
12	Carlo Arrighi	Italy	7.45	
13	Terje Haugland	Norway	7.39	
14	Waldemar Stępień	Poland	7.38	
15	Milan Babić	Yugoslavia	7.36	
16	Philippe Housiaux	Belgium	7.33	
17	Mihail Zaharia	Romania	7.28	
18	Gerald Weixelbaumer	Austria	7.27	
19	Hannu Kyösola	Finland	5.00	
