= Athletics at the 1972 Summer Olympics – Men's long jump =

Men's long jump at the Games of the XX Olympiad
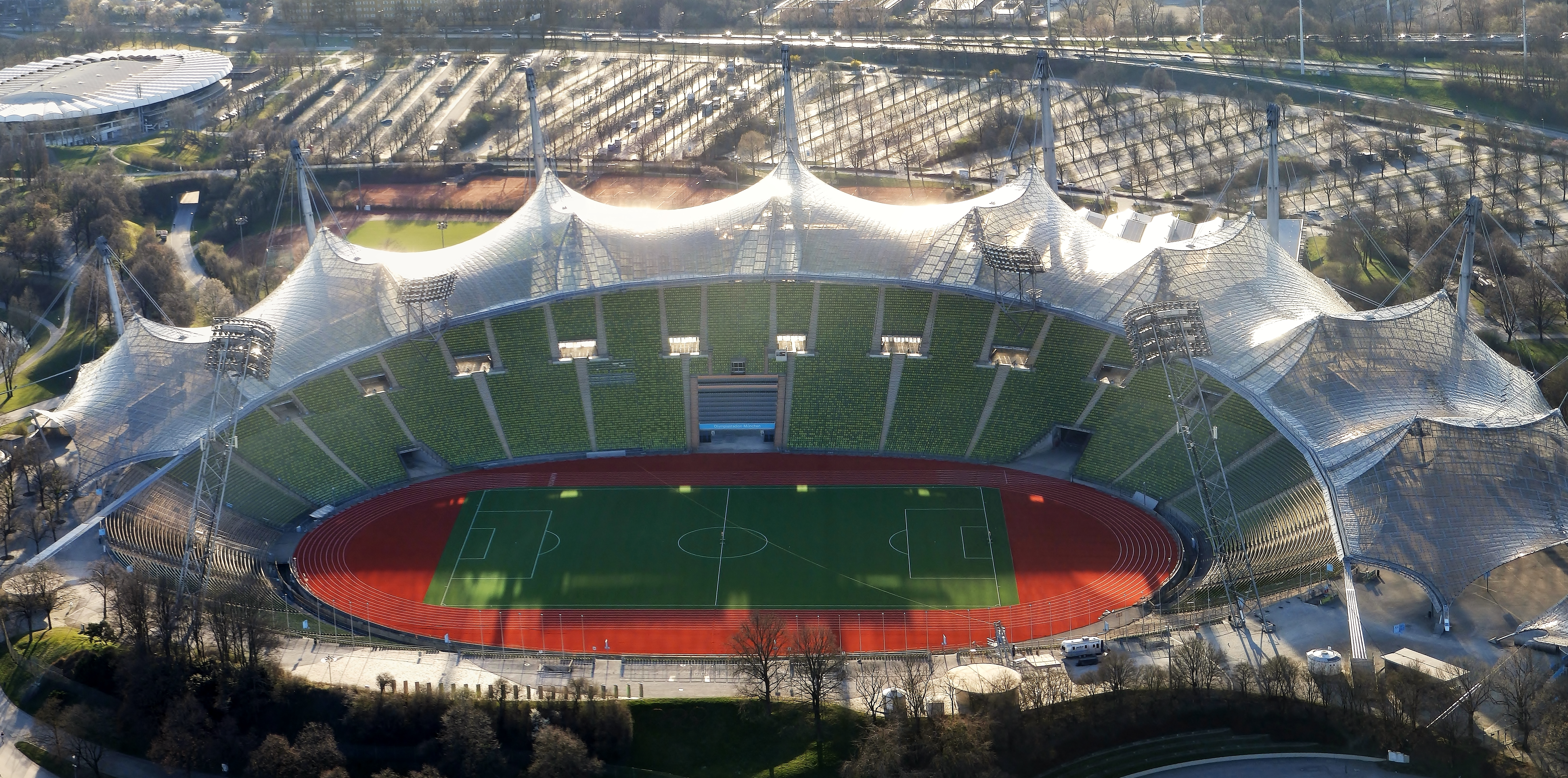
- Olympic Stadium (2014)
- Venue: Olympic Stadium, Munich, West Germany
- Dates: 8 September 1972; 9 September 1972
- Competitors: 36 from 25 nations
- Winning distance: 8.24

Medalists
1st place, gold medalist(s)		Randy Williams; United States
2nd place, silver medalist(s)		Hans Baumgartner; West Germany
3rd place, bronze medalist(s)		Arnie Robinson; United States

The men's long jump event at the 1972 Summer Olympics in Munich was held on 8 & 9 of September. Thirty-six athletes from 25 nations competed. The maximum number of athletes per nation had been set at 3 since the 1930 Olympic Congress. The event was won by 6 cm by Randy Williams of the United States, the nation's second consecutive and 15th overall gold medal in the men's long jump. Hans Baumgartner earned West Germany's first medal in the event (Germany had taken silver in 1936).

== Background ==
This was the 17th appearance of the event, which is one of 12 athletics events to have been held at every Summer Olympics. The returning finalists from the 1968 Games were fourth-place finisher (and 1960 and 1964 bronze medalist) Igor Ter-Ovanesyan of the Soviet Union, seventh-place finisher Jack Pani of France (who did not start this time), ninth-place finisher (and 1964 gold medalist) Lynn Davies of Great Britain, eleventh-place finisher Leonid Barkovskyy of the Soviet Union, and thirteenth-place finisher (and 1964 finalist) Michael Ahey of Ghana. The favorite was Arnie Robinson of the United States.

Bolivia, Cuba, Saudi Arabia, and Togo each made their first appearance in the event. The United States appeared for the 17th time, the only nation to have long jumpers at each of the Games thus far.

== Competition format ==
The 1972 competition used the two-round format with divided final introduced in 1952. The qualifying round gave each competitor three jumps to achieve a distance of 7.80 metres; if fewer than 12 men did so, the top 12 (including all those tied) would advance. The final provided each jumper with three jumps; the top eight jumpers received an additional three jumps for a total of six, with the best to count (qualifying round jumps were not considered for the final).

== Records ==
Prior to this competition, the existing world and Olympic records were as follows.

World record	Bob Beamon (USA)	8.90	Mexico City, Mexico	18 October 1968
Olympic record	Bob Beamon (USA)	8.90	Mexico City, Mexico	18 October 1968

No new world or Olympic records were set during the competition.

== Schedule ==
Qualifying and the final were held on separate days for the first time since 1920.

All times are Central European Time (UTC+1)

Date	Time	Round
Friday, 8 September 1972	10:30	Qualifying
Saturday, 9 September 1972	15:20	Final

== Results ==
=== Qualifying ===
All jumpers reaching 7.80 m (25 ft 7 in), shown in blue and the top 12 including ties, shown in green, advanced to the final round.

Rank	Athlete	Nation	Group	1	2	3	Distance	Notes
1	Randy Williams	United States	A	8.34	—	—	8.34	Q
2	Preston Carrington	United States	B	8.22	—	—	8.22	Q
3	Grzegorz Cybulski	Poland	A	7.61	8.01	—	8.01	Q
4	Arnie Robinson	United States	B	7.99	—	—	7.99	Q
5	Leonid Barkovskyy	Soviet Union	A	7.66	7.98	—	7.98	Q
6	Hans Baumgartner	West Germany	A	7.98	—	—	7.98	Q
7	Max Klauß	East Germany	B	7.93	—	—	7.93	Q
7	Joshua Owusu	Ghana	B	7.93	—	—	7.93	Q
9	Valeriy Podluzhniy	Soviet Union	A	7.91	—	—	7.91	Q
10	Ari Väänänen	Finland	A	7.67	7.90	—	7.90	Q
11	Alan Lerwill	Great Britain	B	7.86	—	—	7.86	Q
12	Jacques Rousseau	France	A	7.77	7.79	7.51	7.79	q
13	Igor Ter-Ovanesyan	Soviet Union	B	X	7.77	X	7.77	
14	Jaroslav Brož	Czechoslovakia	A	7.76	X	7.74	7.76	
15	Bruce Field	Australia	A	X	7.59	7.76	7.76	
16	Rolf Bernhard	Switzerland	A	7.30	7.68	7.61	7.68	
17	Gábor Katona	Hungary	A	X	7.68	X	7.68	
18	Lynn Davies	Great Britain	A	7.64	7.53	X	7.64	
19	Josef Schwarz	West Germany	B	7.63	X	7.62	7.63	
20	Jerzy Homziuk	Poland	A	7.63	X	X	7.63	
21	Finn Bendixen	Norway	A	7.46	7.45	7.61	7.61	
22	Andreas Gloerfeld	West Germany	B	X	7.60	X	7.60	
23	Wilfredo Maisonave	Puerto Rico	B	7.35	7.58	X	7.58	
24	Christian Tourret	France	B	7.54	7.53	7.55	7.55	
25	Carol Corbu	Romania	A	7.54	7.52	7.46	7.54	
26	Henry Jackson	Jamaica	A	7.11	7.24	7.50	7.50	
27	Milán Matos	Cuba	B	7.42	7.46	7.47	7.47	
28	Takayoshi Kawagoe	Japan	B	7.45	7.47	6.72	7.47	
29	Michael Ahey	Ghana	A	X	7.39	—	7.39	
30	Mohinder Singh Gill	India	A	X	X	7.30	7.30	
31	Martin Adouna	Togo	B	7.21	7.25	7.10	7.25	
32	Linus Rebmann	Switzerland	B	X	7.25	5.68	7.25	
33	Chen Chin-Long	Republic of China	B	6.79	X	X	6.79	
34	Lionel Caero	Bolivia	A	6.77	6.60	6.52	6.77	
35	Bilal Said Al-Azma	Saudi Arabia	A	6.32	6.15	6.16	6.32	
—	Jesper Tørring	Denmark	B	X	X	X	No mark	
—	Mansor Dia	Senegal	A	DNS				
—	Patrich Onyango	Kenya	A	DNS				
—	Jack Pani	France	A	DNS				
—	Jong Gu Hyon	North Korea	A	DNS				
—	Milan Spasojević	Yugoslavia	B	DNS				
—	Samuela Yavala	Fiji	B	DNS				
—	Byambajavyn Enkhbaatar	Mongolia	B	DNS				
—	Luiz Carlos de Souza	Brazil	B	DNS				
—	Jan Kobuszewski	Poland	B	DNS				
—	Samuel Igun	Nigeria	B	DNS				
—	Dennis Freeman	Liberia	B	DNS				
—	Giuseppe Gentile	Italy	B	DNS				

=== Final ===
Rank	Athlete	Nation	1	2	3	4	5	6	Distance
1st place, gold medalist(s)	Randy Williams	United States	8.24	7.32	7.72	7.80	7.77	—	8.24
2nd place, silver medalist(s)	Hans Baumgartner	West Germany	X	7.99	8.18	x	7.83	8.05	8.18
3rd place, bronze medalist(s)	Arnie Robinson	United States	X	7.89	7.95	X	8.03	X	8.03
4	Joshua Owusu	Ghana	7.71	7.77	7.88	7.70	7.98	8.01	8.01
5	Preston Carrington	United States	7.99	X	X	7.95	7.63	7.69	7.99
6	Max Klauß	East Germany	7.51	7.94	7.96	7.86	6.13	7.88	7.96
7	Alan Lerwill	Great Britain	X	7.91	7.69	X	7.78	7.85	7.91
8	Leonid Barkovskyy	Soviet Union	7.56	7.53	7.75	7.61	7.56	X	7.75
9	Valeriy Podluzhniy	Soviet Union	X	7.56	7.72	Did not advance			7.72
10	Jacques Rousseau	France	7.65	7.37	7.52	Did not advance			7.65
11	Ari Väänänen	Finland	7.62	7.57	7.60	Did not advance			7.62
12	Grzegorz Cybulski	Poland	7.44	7.58	7.53	Did not advance			7.58
