= Athletics at the 1968 Summer Olympics – Men's long jump =

Men's long jump at the Games of the XIX Olympiad
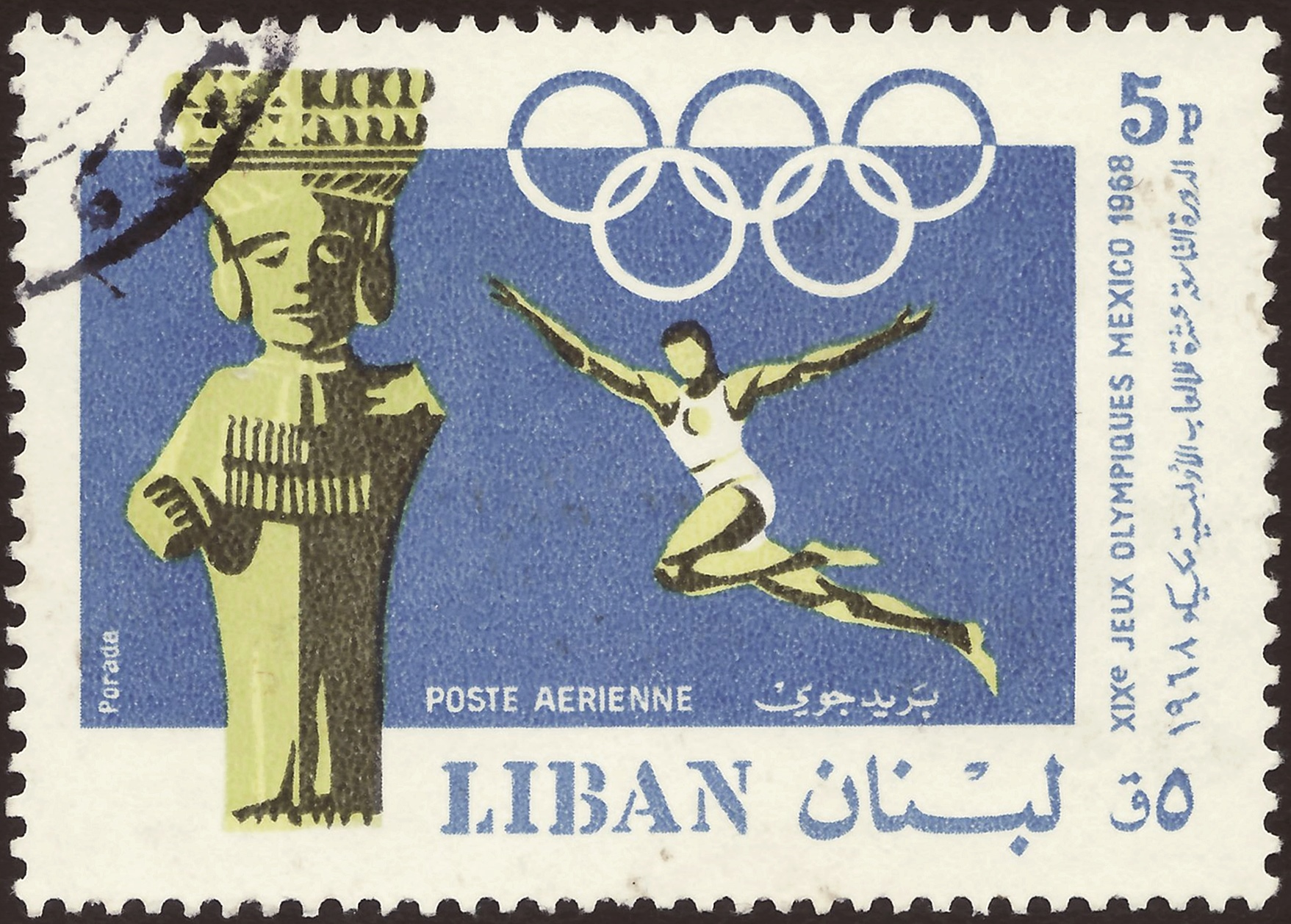
- Lebanese stamp commemorating the 1968 Olympic long jump
- Venue: Estadio Olímpico Universitario
- Date: October 18, 1968
- Competitors: 35 from 22 nations
- Winning distance: 8.90 WR

Medalists
1st place, gold medalist(s)		Bob Beamon; United States
2nd place, silver medalist(s)		Klaus Beer; East Germany
3rd place, bronze medalist(s)		Ralph Boston; United States

Official Video Highlights

The men's long jump was one of four men's jumping events on the Athletics at the 1968 Summer Olympics program in Mexico City. The long jump took place on 18 October 1968. Thirty-five athletes from 22 nations competed. The maximum number of athletes per nation had been set at three since the 1930 Olympic Congress.

Bob Beamon won by 71 cm in a new world record of 8.90 m (29 ft 2 3/8 in); a record which stood for nearly 23 years until it was finally broken in 1991, when Mike Powell jumped 8.95 m (29 ft 4 3/8 in) at the World Championships in Tokyo. It was the United States' 14th gold medal in the men's long jump. Beamon's teammate Ralph Boston became the first man to win three medals in the event (gold in 1960, silver in 1964, bronze in 1968); Igor Ter-Ovanesyan of the Soviet Union barely missed doing so as well, finishing fourth (bronze in both 1960 and 1964). Klaus Beer took silver, East Germany's first medal in the event and the first medal by any German since Luz Long's silver in 1936.

As of 2023, Beamon's winning margin of 71 cm remains the only time the men's long jump was won by more than 50 cm at the Olympics. For comparison, Carl Lewis' greatest winning margin in the long jump at the Olympics was 30 cm which he achieved in Los Angeles in 1984.

== Beamon's jump ==
On his first jump, Bob Beamon landed near the far end of the sand pit but the optical device which had been installed to measure jump distances was not designed to measure a jump of such length. This forced the officials to bring a tape measure to gauge the jump manually, which added to the feat's aura. After several minutes, it was announced that Beamon had set a world record of 8.90 m (29 ft 2 3/8 in), bettering the existing record by 55 cm (21 5/8 in). When the announcer called out the distance for the jump, Beamon – unfamiliar with metric measurements – still did not realize what he had done. When his teammate and coach Ralph Boston told him that he had broken the world record by nearly 2 feet, his legs gave way and an astonished and overwhelmed Beamon suffered a brief cataplexy attack brought on by the emotional shock, and collapsed to his knees, his body unable to support itself, placing his hands over his face. The defending Olympic champion Lynn Davies told Beamon, "You have destroyed this event," and in sports jargon, a new adjective – Beamonesque – came into use to describe spectacular feats.

Prior to Beamon's jump, the world record had been broken thirteen times since 1901, with an average increase of 6 cm (2 1/4 in) and the largest increase being 15 cm (6 in). Beamon's jump is still the Olympic record and 57 years later remains the second longest wind legal jump in history. (Beamon's jump was at the very limit, 2.0 metres per second, of wind assistance and was at altitude, though the next-best jump under the same conditions in 1968 was Ralph Boston's 8.16 metres). Sports journalist Dick Schaap wrote a book about the leap, The Perfect Jump, and the feat was named by Sports Illustrated magazine as one of the five greatest sports moments of the 20th century.

== Background ==
This was the 16th appearance of the event, which is one of 12 athletics events to have been held at every Summer Olympics. The returning finalists from the 1964 Games included all three medalists (Lynn Davies of Great Britain, Ralph Boston of the United States, and Igor Ter-Ovanesyan of the Soviet Union) as well as fifth-place finisher Jean Cochard of France, seventh-place finisher Michael Ahey of Ghana, eighth-place finisher Andrzej Stalmach of Poland, and ninth-place finisher Hiroomi Yamada of Japan. The three Tokyo medalists remained serious medal contenders; Boston and Ter-Ovanesyan shared the world record and Davies was the 1966 European and Commonwealth champion. A newcomer was favored to win, however: Bob Beamon of the United States, who had dominated the 1968 season.

The Bahamas, Belize, Malaysia, Nicaragua, and Senegal each made their first appearance in the event. East and West Germany competed separately for the first time. The United States appeared for the 16th time, the only nation to have long jumpers at each of the Games thus far.

== Competition format ==
The 1968 competition used the two-round format with divided final introduced in 1952. The qualifying round gave each competitor three jumps to achieve a distance of 7.65 metres; if fewer than 12 men did so, the top 12 (including all those tied) would advance. The final provided each jumper with three jumps; the top eight jumpers received an additional three jumps for a total of six, with the best to count (qualifying round jumps were not considered for the final).

== Records ==
Prior to this competition, the existing world and Olympic records were as follows.

World record	Ralph Boston (USA); Igor Ter-Ovanesyan (URS)	8.35	Modesto, United States; Mexico City, Mexico	29 May 1965; 19 October 1967
Olympic record	Ralph Boston (USA)	8.12	Rome, Italy	2 September 1960

Ralph Boston broke his own Olympic record with 8.27 metres in the qualifying round. Bob Beamon's leap in the final, however, shattered the world record by 55 centimetres.

== Schedule ==
All times are Central Standard Time (UTC-6)

Date	Time	Round
Friday, 18 October 1968	10:30; 15:30	Qualifying; Final

== Results ==
=== Qualifying ===
Beamon, the favorite to win, nearly missed the finals entirely after fouling on his first two jumps in the qualifying round. Much like 1936 winner Jesse Owens had done facing the same situation, Beamon aimed his takeoff for a few inches short of the line—sacrificing distance for avoiding a third foul, expecting that he would be able to reach the required 7.65 metres anyway. He did, making the second-best jump of the round at 8.19 metres. Boston had the best jump of the round: an Olympic-record 8.27 metres.

Rank	Athlete	Nation	1	2	3	Distance	Notes
1	Ralph Boston	United States	8.27 OR	—	—	8.27	Q
2	Bob Beamon	United States	X	X	8.19	8.19	Q
3	Lynn Davies	Great Britain	X	X	7.94	7.94	Q
4	Jack Pani	France	7.91	—	—	7.91	Q
4	Tõnu Lepik	Soviet Union	7.91	—	—	7.91	Q
6	Charles Mays	United States	7.85	—	—	7.85	Q
7	Reinhold Boschert	West Germany	X	7.79	—	7.79	Q
8	Mike Ahey	Ghana	7.18	7.77	—	7.77	Q
9	Lars-Olof Höök	Sweden	7.77	—	—	7.77	Q
9	Klaus Beer	East Germany	7.77	—	—	7.77	Q
11	Gérard Ugolini	France	7.75	—	—	7.75	Q
12	Igor Ter-Ovanesyan	Soviet Union	7.74	—	—	7.74	Q
13	Victor Brooks	Jamaica	X	7.54	7.72	7.72	Q, PB
14	Allen Crawley	Australia	X	7.71	—	7.71	Q
15	Andrzej Stalmach	Poland	7.60	7.48	7.70	7.70	Q
16	Leonid Barkovskyy	Soviet Union	7.25	7.70	—	7.70	Q
17	Hiroomi Yamada	Japan	7.67	—	—	7.67	Q
18	Pertti Pousi	Finland	7.46	7.63	X	7.63	
19	Alan Lerwill	Great Britain	7.57	7.62	7.60	7.62	
20	Laurent Sarr	Senegal	7.27	7.50	7.61	7.61	
21	Galdino Flores	Mexico	7.38	7.59	X	7.59	
22	Naoki Abe	Japan	7.44	X	7.58	7.58	
23	Wellesley Clayton	Jamaica	7.54	7.57	X	7.57	
24	Shinji Ogura	Japan	7.57	X	7.28	7.57	
25	Philippe Housiaux	Belgium	7.30	7.44	7.40	7.44	
26	Michel Charland	Canada	7.15	7.35	7.35	7.35	
27	Clément Sagna	Senegal	7.26	7.17	7.31	7.31	
28	Su Wen-ho	Taiwan	7.30	X	7.14	7.30	
29	Anthony Chong	Malaysia	7.09	X	7.29	7.29	
30	Jerry Wisdom	Bahamas	X	X	6.99	6.99	
31	Chen Ming-chi	Taiwan	6.62	X	6.71	6.71	
32	Don Vélez	Nicaragua	X	6.63	X	6.63	
33	Jean Cochard	France	6.11	—	X	6.11	
34	Owen Meighan	British Honduras	X	6.06	6.06	6.06	
—	Peter Reed	Great Britain	X	X	X	No mark	
—	Johnson Amoah	Ghana	DNS				
—	Chen Chuan-show	Taiwan	DNS				
—	Zoltán Cziffra	Hungary	DNS				
—	Giuseppe Gentile	Italy	DNS				
—	Henrik Kalocsai	Hungary	DNS				
—	Phil May	Australia	DNS				
—	Labh Singh	India	DNS				

=== Final ===
The final was held on October 18, 1968. Beamon was the fourth jumper to go, following Yamada, Brooks, and Boschert. Each of those three fouled on their first jump; Beamon's record-shattering jump was thus the first legal mark in the round—and effectively ended the contest for the gold medal. Beamon jumped once more, but passed on his third through sixth attempts.

Davies was tied for eighth after the first three jumps and should have been among those receiving three additional jumps; he was "mistakenly not advanced." After the error was discovered (and everyone else had finished jumping), the officials offered Davies the chance to take the extra three jumps. He declined.

Rank	Athlete	Nation	1	2	3	4	5	6	Distance
1st place, gold medalist(s)	Bob Beamon	United States	8.90 WR	8.04	—	—	—	—	8.90
2nd place, silver medalist(s)	Klaus Beer	East Germany	7.97	8.19	X	7.62	X	X	8.19
3rd place, bronze medalist(s)	Ralph Boston	United States	8.16	8.05	7.91	X	X	7.97	8.16
4	Igor Ter-Ovanesyan	Soviet Union	8.12	8.09	X	X	8.10	8.08	8.12
5	Tõnu Lepik	Soviet Union	7.82	8.09	7.63	7.36	7.84	7.75	8.09
6	Allen Crawley	Australia	X	8.01	X	7.80	X	8.02	8.02
7	Jack Pani	France	7.94	7.97	7.69	7.58	7.61	X	7.97
8	Andrzej Stalmach	Poland	7.71	7.94	7.88	7.75	7.75	7.84	7.94
9	Lynn Davies	Great Britain	6.43	7.94	X	—	—	—	7.94
10	Hiroomi Yamada	Japan	X	7.93	X	Did not advance			7.93
11	Leonid Barkovskyy	Soviet Union	7.90	7.82	X	Did not advance			7.90
12	Reinhold Boschert	West Germany	X	7.54	7.89	Did not advance			7.89
13	Michael Ahey	Ghana	7.71	7.57	7.40	Did not advance			7.71
14	Lars-Olof Höök	Sweden	7.66	X	X	Did not advance			7.66
15	Victor Brooks	Jamaica	X	X	7.51	Did not advance			7.51
16	Gerard Ugolini	France	7.44	7.02	X	Did not advance			7.44
