= 1969 European Indoor Games – Men's long jump =

The men's long jump event at the 1969 European Indoor Games was held on 8 March in Belgrade.

== Results ==
Rank	Name	Nationality	Result	Notes
1st place, gold medalist(s)	Klaus Beer	East Germany	7.77	
2nd place, silver medalist(s)	Lynn Davies	Great Britain	7.76	
3rd place, bronze medalist(s)	Rafael Blanquer	Spain	7.63	
4	Vasile Sărucan	Romania	7.61	
5	Miljenko Rak	Yugoslavia	7.53	
6	Mauri Myllymäki	Finland	7.42	
7	Reinhold Boschert	West Germany	7.39	
8	Stanisław Szudrowicz	Poland	7.38	
9	Lars-Olof Höök	Sweden	7.33	
10	André Vix	France	7.28	
11	Terje Haugland	Norway	7.10	
