= 1972 European Athletics Indoor Championships – Men's long jump =

The men's long jump event at the 1972 European Athletics Indoor Championships was held on 11 March in Grenoble.

== Results ==
Rank	Name	Nationality	#1	#2	#3	#4	#5	#6	Result	Notes
1st place, gold medalist(s)	Max Klauß	East Germany	7.88	7.85	7.92	7.81	6.71	8.02	8.02	
2nd place, silver medalist(s)	Hans Baumgartner	West Germany	7.91	7.91	x	7.98	x	7.99	7.99	
3rd place, bronze medalist(s)	Jaroslav Brož	Czechoslovakia	7.82	7.87	7.88	7.86	x	7.81	7.88	
4	Miljenko Rak	Yugoslavia	7.77	x	x	7.80	7.78	7.88	7.88	
5	Tõnu Lepik	Soviet Union	7.75	x	7.58	6.32	7.82	x	7.82	
6	Jack Pani	France	7.65	7.72	7.70	7.79	x	x	7.79	
7	Klaus Beer	East Germany	7.71	6.14	7.61	7.66	7.49	x	7.71	
8	Lynn Davies	Great Britain	7.51	7.64	7.64	x	x	x	7.64	
9	Carol Corbu	Romania	7.50	7.62	7.37				7.62	
10	Valeriu Jurcă	Romania	7.61		7.50				7.61	
11	Grzegorz Cybulski	Poland		7.51	7.38				7.51	
12	Jesper Tørring	Denmark	7.09	6.94					7.09	
	Reijo Toivonen	Finland	x	x	x				NM	
