= 1974 European Athletics Indoor Championships – Men's long jump =

The men's long jump event at the 1974 European Athletics Indoor Championships was held on 9 March in Gothenburg.

== Results ==
Rank	Name	Nationality	Result	Notes
1st place, gold medalist(s)	Jean-François Bonhème	France	8.17	NR
2nd place, silver medalist(s)	Hans Baumgartner	West Germany	8.10	
3rd place, bronze medalist(s)	Max Klauß	East Germany	8.03	
4	Valeriy Podluzhniy	Soviet Union	7.97	
5	Grzegorz Cybulski	Poland	7.86	
6	Alan Lerwill	Great Britain	7.84	
7	Rafael Blanquer	Spain	7.69	
8	Frank Wartenberg	East Germany	7.65	
9	Ulf Jarfelt	Sweden	7.60	
10	Carol Corbu	Romania	7.34	
11	Andreas Gloerfeld	West Germany	7.27	
12	Aleksey Pereverzev	Soviet Union	6.95	
