= Athletics at the 1973 Summer Universiade – Men's long jump =

The men's long jump event at the 1973 Summer Universiade was held at the Central Lenin Stadium in Moscow on 17 and 18 August.

== Medalists ==
Gold	Silver	Bronze
Valeriy Podluzhniy; Soviet Union	Jean-François Bonhème; France	Hans Baumgartner; West Germany

== Results ==
=== Qualification ===
Rank	Group	Athlete	Nationality	Result	Notes
1	?	Hans Baumgartner	West Germany	7.81	
2	?	Jean-François Bonhème	France	7.68	
2	?	Danny Brabham	United States	7.68	
2	?	Chris Commons	Australia	7.68	
5	?	Valeriy Podluzhniy	Soviet Union	7.67	
6	?	Lutz Gawlik	East Germany	7.61	
7	?	Jacques Rousseau	France	7.60	
8	?	Stefan Lazarescu	Romania	7.56	
9	?	Philippe Housiaux	Belgium	7.50	
9	?	Milán Matos	Cuba	7.50	
9	?	Piercarlo Molinaris	Italy	7.50	
12	?	Zbigniew Beta	Poland	7.48	
12	?	Nenad Stekić	Yugoslavia	7.48	
14	?	Alan Lerwill	Great Britain	7.45	
15	?	Andreas Gloerfeld	West Germany	7.44	
16	?	Kazuaki Morioka	Japan	7.40	
16	?	Pavel Tolnay	Czechoslovakia	7.40	
18	?	Aleksey Pereverzev	Soviet Union	7.37	
19	?	Kenneth Atkins	Great Britain	7.35	
20	?	Ronaldo Lobato	Brazil	7.33	
21	?	Wilfredo Maisonave	Puerto Rico	7.31	
22	?	Rick Cuttell	Canada	7.23	
23	?	Efrain Malberty	Cuba	7.16	
24	?	Gábor Katona	Hungary	7.15	
25	?	Manabu Masuda	Japan	7.13	
26	?	Helmut Matzner	Austria	6.73	
27	?	Moise Denessio	Central African Republic	6.57	
28	?	Ali Ehsanollah Parsa	Iran	6.46	
29	?	Théophile Hounou	Benin	6.35	
30	?	Doljinsouren Ganbat	Mongolia	6.25	
	?	Dario Arrighi	Italy	NM	

=== Final ===
Rank	Athlete	Nationality	Result	Notes
1st place, gold medalist(s)	Valeriy Podluzhniy	Soviet Union	8.15	
2nd place, silver medalist(s)	Jean-François Bonhème	France	7.85	
3rd place, bronze medalist(s)	Hans Baumgartner	West Germany	7.85	
4	Jacques Rousseau	France	7.78	
5	Lutz Gawlik	East Germany	7.69	
6	Chris Commons	Australia	7.61	
7	Zbigniew Beta	Poland	7.53	
8	Piercarlo Molinaris	Italy	7.49	
9	Nenad Stekić	Yugoslavia	7.47	
10	Danny Brabham	United States	7.46	
11	Philippe Housiaux	Belgium	7.40	
12	Stefan Lazarescu	Romania	7.29	
13	Milán Matos	Cuba	7.24	
