= Athletics at the 1975 Summer Universiade – Men's long jump =

The men's long jump event at the 1975 Summer Universiade was held at the Stadio Olimpico in Rome on 18 and 19 September.

== Medalists ==
Gold	Silver	Bronze
Grzegorz Cybulski; Poland	Nenad Stekić; Yugoslavia	Aleksey Pereverzev; Soviet Union

== Results ==
=== Qualification ===
Rank	Group	Athlete	Nationality	Time	Notes
1	?	Nenad Stekić	Yugoslavia	7.88	
2	?	Danny Seay	United States	7.80	
3	?	Aleksey Pereverzev	Soviet Union	7.70	
3	?	Grzegorz Cybulski	Poland	7.70	
5	?	Åke Fransson	Sweden	7.58	
6	?	Ulrich Köwring	West Germany	7.55	
7	?	Stefan Lazarescu	Romania	7.50	
8	?	Helmut Matzner	Austria	7.35	
9	?	Yevgeniy Shubin	Soviet Union	7.30	
10	?	Rick Cuttell	Canada	7.29	
10	?	Andrzej Kędzierski	Poland	7.29	
12	?	Piercarlo Molinaris	Italy	7.28	
12	?	Jean-François Bonheme	France	7.28	
14	?	Panagiotis Khatzistathis	Greece	7.25	
15	?	Gorban Goimo Hammadi	Iran	7.08	
16	?	Jaroslav Prišcák	Czechoslovakia	7.00	
17	?	Michel Marrel	Switzerland	6.89	
18	?	Carlos Mejía	Honduras	6.19	
19	?	Carlos Velázques	Honduras	5.83	

=== Final ===
Rank	Athlete	Nationality	#1	#2	#3	#4	#5	#6	Result	Notes
1st place, gold medalist(s)	Grzegorz Cybulski	Poland	7.79	7.98	7.96	8.04	8.27	8.09	8.27	UR
2nd place, silver medalist(s)	Nenad Stekić	Yugoslavia	x	x	8.00	x	8.13	x	8.13	
3rd place, bronze medalist(s)	Aleksey Pereverzev	Soviet Union							7.90	
4	Danny Seay	United States							7.88	
5	Ulrich Köwring	West Germany							7.76	
6	Jean-François Bonhème	France							7.65	
7	Stefan Lazarescu	Romania							7.54	
8	Piercarlo Molinaris	Italy							7.54	
9	Rick Cuttell	Canada							7.41	
10	Åke Fransson	Sweden							7.40	
11	Andrzej Kędzierski	Poland							7.40	
12	Helmut Matzner	Austria							7.26	
	Yevgeniy Shubin	Soviet Union							NM	
