= Athletics at the 1964 Summer Olympics – Men's long jump =

Men's long jump at the Games of the XVIII Olympiad
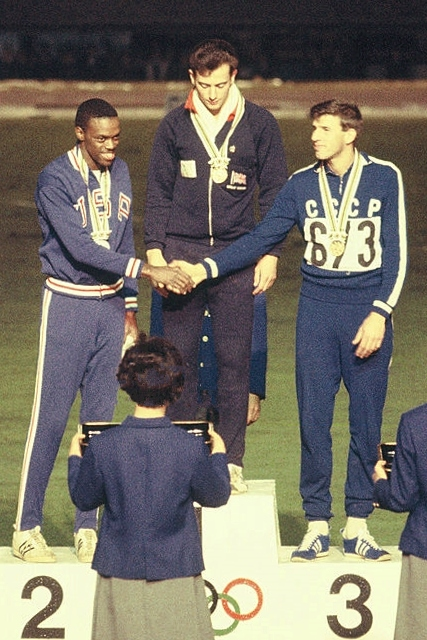
- Ralph Boston, Lynn Davies and Igor Ter-Ovanesyan
- Venue: Olympic Stadium
- Date: 18 October 1964
- Competitors: 32 from 20 nations
- Winning distance: 8.07

Medalists
1st place, gold medalist(s)		Lynn Davies; Great Britain
2nd place, silver medalist(s)		Ralph Boston; United States
3rd place, bronze medalist(s)		Igor Ter-Ovanesyan; Soviet Union

Official Video Highlights @57:04 Video on YouTube

The men's long jump was one of four men's jumping events on the Athletics at the 1964 Summer Olympics program in Tokyo. It was held on 18 October 1964. 37 athletes from 23 nations entered, with 5 not starting in the qualification round. The maximum number of athletes per nation had been set at 3 since the 1930 Olympic Congress. The event was won by 4 cm by Lynn Davies of Great Britain, breaking a string of eight straight American victories. It was Great Britain's first gold medal in the men's long jump, and first long jump medal since 1900. It was only the second time the United States had not won the event, with Sweden's William Petersson in 1920 the only non-American to win before Davies. Ralph Boston of the United States and Igor Ter-Ovanesyan of the Soviet Union became the third and fourth men to win a second medal in the long jump (Boston had won gold and Ter-Ovanesyan bronze in 1960).

== Background ==
This was the 15th appearance of the event, which is one of 12 athletics events to have been held at every Summer Olympics. The returning finalists from the 1960 Games were defending champion Ralph Boston of the United States, bronze medalist Igor Ter-Ovanesyan of the Soviet Union, eleventh-place finisher Dimos Manglaras of Greece, and thirteenth-place finisher Fred Alsop of Great Britain. The event was expected to be a battle between Boston and Ter-Ovanesyan; since the 1960 Games, Boston had broken his own world record twice, Ter-Ovanesyan had broken Boston's new world record, and then Boston had first tied and then broken Ter-Ovanesyan's new world record.

Ghana, Hong Kong, Jamaica, and Puerto Rico each made their first appearance in the event. The United States appeared for the 15th time, the only nation to have long jumpers at each of the Games thus far.

== Competition format ==
The 1964 competition used the two-round format with divided final introduced in 1952. The qualifying round gave each competitor three jumps to achieve a distance of 7.60 metres; if fewer than 12 men did so, the top 12 (including all those tied) would advance. The final provided each jumper with three jumps; the top six jumpers received an additional three jumps for a total of six, with the best to count (qualifying round jumps were not considered for the final).

== Records ==
Prior to this competition, the existing world and Olympic records were as follows.

World record	Ralph Boston (USA)	8.34	Los Angeles, United States	12 September 1964
Olympic record	Ralph Boston (USA)	8.12	Rome, Italy	2 September 1960

No new world or Olympic records were set during the competition.

== Schedule ==
All times are Japan Standard Time (UTC+9)

Date	Time	Round
Sunday, 18 October 1964	10:30; 15:00	Qualifying; Final

== Results ==
=== Qualifying ===
The qualification standard was 7.60 metres with a minimum of 12 jumpers advancing. Each jumper had three opportunities. Since only 5 jumpers met the standard, the next 7 longest jumpers also advanced.

Rank	Athlete	Nation	1	2	3	Distance	Notes
1	Ralph Boston	United States	8.03	—	—	8.03	Q
2	Lynn Davies	Great Britain	7.39	X	7.78	7.78	Q
3	Igor Ter-Ovanesyan	Soviet Union	7.78	—	—	7.78	Q
4	Gayle Hopkins	United States	7.67	—	—	7.67	Q
5	Wariboko West	Nigeria	7.62	—	—	7.62	Q
6	Wolfgang Klein	United Team of Germany	7.59	X	7.54	7.59	q
7	John Morbey	Great Britain	X	X	7.56	7.56	q
8	Michael Ahey	Ghana	7.21	7.26	7.53	7.53	q
9	Jean Cochard	France	6.96	X	7.52	7.52	q
10	Luis Felipe Areta	Spain	7.31	7.46	7.34	7.46	q
11	Andrzej Stalmach	Poland	7.27	7.46	X	7.46	q
12	Yamada Hiroomi	Japan	X	7.46	X	7.46	q
13	Pentti Eskola	Finland	7.43	7.35	X	7.43	
14	Antanas Vaupšas	Soviet Union	X	X	7.43	7.43	
15	Leonid Barkovskyy	Soviet Union	7.30	7.39	X	7.39	
16	Sunday Akpata	Nigeria	X	X	7.34	7.34	
17	Raycho Tsonev	Bulgaria	X	7.33	7.29	7.33	
18	Hans-Helmut Trense	United Team of Germany	7.09	7.20	7.30	7.30	
19	Wellesley Clayton	Jamaica	6.75	X	7.28	7.28	
20	Koru Kawazu	Japan	7.28	X	X	7.28	
21	Klaus Beer	United Team of Germany	X	7.25	7.27	7.27	
22	Fred Alsop	Great Britain	7.26	X	X	7.26	
22	Phil Shinnick	United States	7.26	X	X	7.26	
24	Alain Levèvre	France	6.77	X	7.24	7.24	
25	Dimos Manglaras	Greece	7.06	7.11	7.21	7.21	
26	Satoshi Takayanagi	Japan	7.15	X	X	7.15	
27	Ian Tomlinson	Australia	7.07	X	X	7.07	
28	Henrik Kalocsai	Hungary	6.94	6.99	X	6.99	
29	S. Bondada Venkata	India	X	6.76	X	6.76	
30	Samuel Cruz	Puerto Rico	X	6.74	6.72	6.74	
31	Chu Ming	Hong Kong	6.41	X	4.91	6.41	
—	Iftikhar Shah	Pakistan	X	X	X	No mark	
—	Joseph Adjei	Ghana	DNS				
—	Constantin Badea	Romania	DNS				
—	William Kamanyi	Uganda	DNS				
—	George Ogan	Nigeria	DNS				
—	Samir Vincent	Iraq	DNS				

=== Final ===
For the final, the qualification marks were ignored and each jumper received three jumps. The six jumpers with the best marks in the final were awarded three more attempts, and their best mark from all six of the final jumps was considered.

Rank	Athlete	Nation	1	2	3	4	5	6	Distance
1st place, gold medalist(s)	Lynn Davies	Great Britain	7.45	X	7.59	7.78	8.07	7.74	8.07
2nd place, silver medalist(s)	Ralph Boston	United States	7.76	7.85	7.62	7.88	X	8.03	8.03
3rd place, bronze medalist(s)	Igor Ter-Ovanesyan	Soviet Union	7.78	X	7.64	7.80	7.99	7.81	7.99
4	Wariboko West	Nigeria	7.56	7.51	7.50	7.40	7.60	X	7.60
5	Jean Cochard	France	X	X	7.44	7.43	7.26	7.10	7.44
6	Luis Felipe Areta	Spain	7.20	7.31	7.34	5.16	X	6.99	7.34
7	Michael Ahey	Ghana	6.99	7.00	7.30	Did not advance			7.30
8	Andrzej Stalmach	Poland	7.26	7.10	X	Did not advance			7.26
9	Yamada Hiroomi	Japan	6.94	X	7.16	Did not advance			7.16
10	Wolfgang Klein	United Team of Germany	7.06	7.13	7.15	Did not advance			7.15
11	John Morbey	Great Britain	7.09	6.91	6.77	Did not advance			7.09
—	Gayle Hopkins	United States	X	X	X	Did not advance			No mark
