= 1967 European Indoor Games – Men's long jump =

The men's long jump event at the 1967 European Indoor Games was held on 11 and 12 March in Prague.

== Medalists ==
Gold	Silver	Bronze
Lynn Davies; Great Britain	Leonid Barkovskyy; Soviet Union	Andrzej Stalmach; Poland

== Results ==
=== Qualification ===
Rank	Name	Nationality	#1	#2	#3	Result	Notes
1	Lynn Davies	Great Britain	7.72	x	x	7.72	q
2	Leonid Barkovskyy	Soviet Union	7.62	7.69	x	7.69	q
3	Andrzej Stalmach	Poland	7.55	7.58	7.61	7.61	q
4	Miroslav Hutter	Czechoslovakia	7.60	x	7.52	7.60	q
5	Tõnu Lepik	Soviet Union	7.60	x	–	7.60	q
6	Milan Babić	Yugoslavia	7.14	7.38	7.51	7.51	q, NR
7	Raycho Tsonev	Bulgaria	7.33	7.29	7.22	7.33	
8	Ján Solčany	Czechoslovakia	7.09	7.07	7.03	7.09	
9	Jacinto Segura	Spain	5.15	7.08	6.85	7.08	
10	Pierluigi Gatti	Italy	x	x	6.89	6.89	
	József Hossala	Hungary	x	x	x	NM	

=== Final ===
Rank	Name	Nationality	#1	#2	#3	#4	#5	#6	Result	Notes
1st place, gold medalist(s)	Lynn Davies	Great Britain	x	x	x	7.85	x	6.52	7.85	
2nd place, silver medalist(s)	Leonid Barkovskyy	Soviet Union	x	x	7.85	x	x	x	7.85	
3rd place, bronze medalist(s)	Andrzej Stalmach	Poland	7.66	x	7.74	x	7.60	7.69	7.74	
4	Tõnu Lepik	Soviet Union	x	x	x	7.68	x	x	7.68	
5	Milan Babić	Yugoslavia	7.29	7.26	7.40	7.47	x	7.24	7.47	
6	Miroslav Hutter	Czechoslovakia	x	x	7.41	7.37	7.41	x	7.41	
