= Athletics at the 1970 Summer Universiade – Men's long jump =

The men's long jump event at the 1970 Summer Universiade was held at the Stadio Comunale in Turin on 3 and 4 September 1970.

== Medalists ==
Gold	Silver	Bronze
Alan Lerwill; Great Britain	Arnie Robinson; United States	Geoff Hignett; Great Britain

== Results ==
=== Qualification ===
Rank	Heat	Athlete	Nationality	Result	Notes
1	?	Jean-François Bonhème	France	7.78	Q
2	?	Miljenko Rak	Yugoslavia	7.77	Q, NR
3	?	Nenad Stekić	Yugoslavia	7.70	Q
4	?	Naoki Abe	Japan	7.66	Q
5	?	Klaus Beer	East Germany	7.64	Q
6	?	Arnie Robinson	United States	7.62	Q
7	?	Alan Lerwill	Great Britain	7.57	Q
7	?	Abelardo Pacheco	Cuba	7.57	Q
9	?	Carlo Arrighi	Italy	7.55	Q
9	?	Miroslav Hutter	Czechoslovakia	7.55	Q
11	?	Geoff Hignett	Great Britain	7.49	Q
11	?	Hans Schicker	West Germany	7.49	Q
13	?	Aleksey Khlopotnov	Soviet Union	7.48	Q
14	?	Lawrie Walkley	Australia	7.44	Q
14	?	Stanisław Cabaj	Poland	7.44	Q
16	?	Elio Lazzarotti	Italy	7.33	
17	?	Gerald Weixelbaumer	Austria	7.27	
18	?	David Urhobo Tonitse	Nigeria	7.24	
19	?	Anthony Adefeni	Nigeria	7.05	
20	?	Admilson Chitarra	Brazil	7.03	
21	?	Don Warren	United States	7.02	
22	?	Abreu Matos	Portugal	7.01	

=== Final ===
Rank	Name	Nationality	Result	Notes
1st place, gold medalist(s)	Alan Lerwill	Great Britain	7.91	
2nd place, silver medalist(s)	Arnie Robinson	United States	7.78	
3rd place, bronze medalist(s)	Geoff Hignett	Great Britain	7.76	
4	Nenad Stekić	Yugoslavia	7.67	
5	Klaus Beer	East Germany	7.65	
6	Miljenko Rak	Yugoslavia	7.62	
7	Naoki Abe	Japan	7.59	
8	Aleksey Khlopotnov	Soviet Union	7.57	
9	Abelardo Pacheco	Cuba	7.52	
10	Miroslav Hutter	Czechoslovakia	7.47	
11	Jean-François Bonhème	France	7.47	
12	Lawrie Walkley	Australia	7.47	
13	Hans Schicker	West Germany	7.38	
14	Carlo Arrighi	Italy	7.36	
15	Stanisław Cabaj	Poland	7.33	
