= 1966 European Athletics Championships – Men's long jump =

Men's long jump at the European Athletics Championships

The men's long jump at the 1966 European Athletics Championships was held in Budapest, Hungary, at Népstadion on 30 and 31 August 1966.

== Medalists ==
Gold	Lynn Davies; Great Britain
Silver	Igor Ter-Ovanesyan; Soviet Union
Bronze	Jean Cochard; France

== Results ==
=== Final ===
31 August

Rank	Name	Nationality	Result	Notes
1st place, gold medalist(s)	Lynn Davies	Great Britain	7.98	CR
2nd place, silver medalist(s)	Igor Ter-Ovanesyan	Soviet Union	7.88	
3rd place, bronze medalist(s)	Jean Cochard	France	7.88	NR
4	Leonid Barkovskyy	Soviet Union	7.74	
5	Rainer Stenius	Finland	7.68	
6	Hermann Latzel	West Germany	7.59	
7	Pentti Eskola	Finland	7.51	
8	Pertti Pousi	Finland	7.46	
9	Miroslav Hutter	Czechoslovakia	7.33	
10	Andrzej Stalmach	Poland	7.31	
11	Jacques Pani	France	7.31	
12	German Klimov	Soviet Union	7.30	
13	Ali Brakchi	France	7.21	

=== Qualification ===
30 August

Rank	Name	Nationality	Result	Notes
1	Igor Ter-Ovanesyan	Soviet Union	7.67	Q
2	Rainer Stenius	Finland	7.60	Q
3	Jean Cochard	France	7.60	Q
4	Lynn Davies	Great Britain	7.59	Q
5	Leonid Barkovskyy	Soviet Union	7.55	Q
6	Jacques Pani	France	7.54	Q
7	Pertti Pousi	Finland	7.53	Q
8	Hermann Latzel	West Germany	7.52	Q
9	Miroslav Hutter	Czechoslovakia	7.49	Q
10	Andrzej Stalmach	Poland	7.47	Q
11	Ali Brakchi	France	7.44	Q
12	Pentti Eskola	Finland	7.42	Q
13	German Klimov	Soviet Union	7.42	Q
14	Raycho Tsonev	Bulgaria	7.36	
15	Dimosthenios Manglaras	Greece	7.35	
16	Adrian Samungi	Romania	7.30	
17	József Hossala	Hungary	7.27	
18	Vasile Sarucan	Romania	7.07	
19	Béla Margitics	Hungary	6.72	
20	Alfred Bajada	Malta	6.02	

== Participation ==
According to an unofficial count, 20 athletes from 12 countries participated in the event.

- Malta (1)
- Bulgaria (1)
- Czechoslovakia (1)
- Finland (3)
- France (3)
- Greece (1)
- Hungary (2)
- Poland (1)
- Romania (2)
- Soviet Union (3)
- Great Britain (1)
- West Germany (1)
