= Ralph Boston =

American athlete (1939–2023)

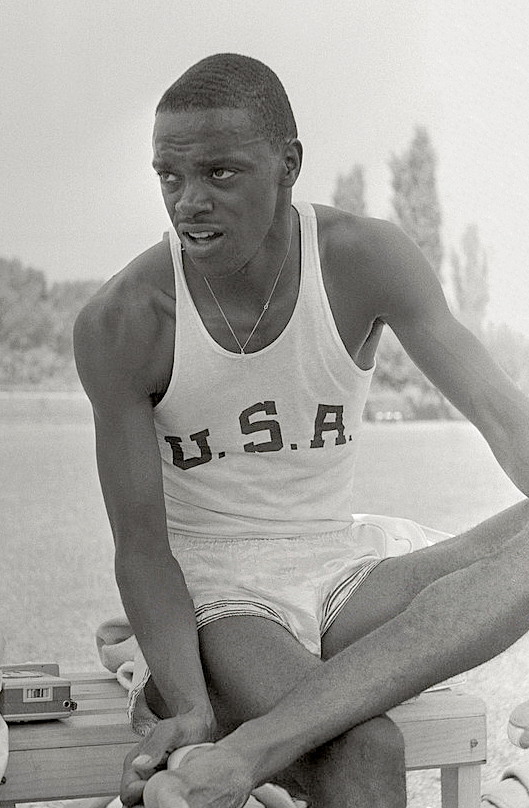
- Boston at the 1960 Olympics

Personal information
- Full name: Ralph Harold Boston
- Born: May 9, 1939 Laurel, Mississippi, U.S.
- Died: April 30, 2023 (aged 83) Peachtree City, Georgia, U.S.
- Height: 6 ft 1 1/2 in (187 cm)
- Weight: 163 lb (74 kg)

Sport
- Sport: Track and field
- Events: Sprint, hurdles, long jump, high jump, triple jump, pole vault,
- Club: Southern California Striders, Anaheim

Achievements and titles
- Personal bests: 100 yd – 9.6 (1964); 220 yd – 22.0 (1964); 120 ydH – 13.7 (1961); HJ – 2.04 m (1962); PV – 4.16 m (1960); LJ – 8.35 m (1965); TJ – 15.89 m (1964)
Medal record
Representing the United States
Olympic Games
Gold medal – first place	1960 Rome	Long jump
Silver medal – second place	1964 Tokyo	Long jump
Bronze medal – third place	1968 Mexico City	Long jump
Pan American Games
Gold medal – first place	1963 Sao Paulo	Long jump
Gold medal – first place	1967 Winnipeg	Long jump

Ralph Harold Boston (May 9, 1939 – April 30, 2023) was an American track athlete who received three Olympic medals and became the first person to break the 27 feet (8.2 m) barrier in the long jump.

== Early years and education ==
Boston was born in Laurel, Mississippi. As a student at Tennessee State University, he won the 1960 National Collegiate Athletic Association title in the long jump. In August of the same year, he broke the world record in the event, held by Jesse Owens for 25 years, at the Mt. SAC Relays. Already the world record holder, he improved the mark past 27 feet (8.2 m), jumping 27 feet 0.5 inches (8.242 m) at the Modesto Relays on May 27, 1961.

== Athletic career ==
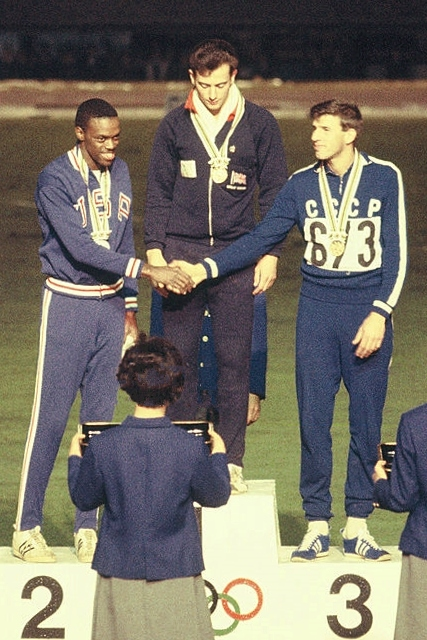
Ralph Boston, Lynn Davies, and Igor Ter-Ovanesyan at the 1964 Summer Olympics

Boston qualified for the Summer Olympics in Rome, where he won the gold medal in the long jump, setting the Olympic record at 8.12 m (26 ft 7 1/2 in), while narrowly defeating American teammate Bo Roberson by a mere centimeter.

Boston won the Amateur Athletic Union (AAU) national championship in the long jump six times in a row from 1961 to 1966. He also had the longest triple jump for an American in 1963. He returned to the Tokyo Olympics as the world record holder after losing the record to Igor Ter-Ovanesyan, then regaining the record a couple of months before the games, first in Kingston, Jamaica and improving it at the 1964 Olympic Trials. In the Olympic final, Boston exchanged the lead with Ter-Ovanesyan. Going into the fifth round, Boston was leading but fouled while both Lynn Davies and Ter-Ovanesyan jumped past him. On his final jump, he was able to jump past Ter-Ovanesyan, but could not catch Davies and ended winning the silver medal.

Boston's final record improvement to 8.35 m was again at the 1965 Modesto Relays. It was tied at altitude by Ter-Ovanesyan in 1967. In 1967, he lost the national title to Jerry Proctor. When rival Bob Beamon was suspended from the University of Texas at El Paso, for refusing to compete against Brigham Young University, alleging it had racist policies, Boston began to coach him unofficially. Beamon took the 1968 National Championships. At the 1968 Olympics, Boston watched his pupil obliterate the tied world record by jumping 8.90 m (29 ft 2 1/4 in). Boston was then 29 years old. He won a bronze medal behind Beamon and Klaus Beer and retired from competitions shortly thereafter. He moved to Knoxville, Tennessee, and worked for the University of Tennessee as Coordinator of Minority Affairs and Assistant Dean of Students from 1968 to 1975. He was the field event reporter for the CBS Sports Spectacular coverage of domestic track and field events. He was inducted into the USA Track and Field Hall of Fame in 1974 and into the U.S. Olympic & Paralympic Hall of Fame in 1985.

== Later years ==
Boston participated in the raising of the Olympic flag for the 1996 Summer Olympics in Atlanta, and by 1997, Boston had moved into Peachtree City, Georgia.

A Los Angeles Times article on Boston from August 2, 2010, coinciding roughly with the 50th anniversary of his initial world record, described him as a divorced great-grandfather who was writing an autobiography. He split his time between Atlanta, Georgia and Knoxville.

Boston died of complications from a stroke at his home in Peachtree City on April 30, 2023, at the age of 83.

Awards and achievements
Preceded by (United States) Jesse Owens	Men's Long Jump World Record Holder; August 12, 1960 – June 10, 1962	Succeeded by (Soviet Union) Igor Ter-Ovanesyan
Preceded by (Soviet Union) Igor Ter-Ovanesyan	Men's Long Jump World Record Holder; August 15, 1964 – October 19, 1967	Succeeded by (Soviet Union) Igor Ter-Ovanesyan
Awards
Preceded by (United States) Rafer Johnson	Track & Field Athlete of the Year; 1961	Succeeded by (New Zealand) Peter Snell
Sporting positions
Preceded by Unknown	Men's Long Jump Best Year Performance; 1960, 1961	Succeeded by (Soviet Union) Igor Ter-Ovanesyan
Preceded by (United States) Phil Shinnick	Men's Long Jump Best Year Performance; 1964, 1965	Succeeded by (Soviet Union) Igor Ter-Ovanesyan
