= 1973 European Athletics Indoor Championships – Men's long jump =

Men's long jump event

The men's long jump event at the 1973 European Athletics Indoor Championships was held on 10 March in Rotterdam.

== Results ==
Rank	Name	Nationality	Result	Notes
1st place, gold medalist(s)	Hans Baumgartner	West Germany	7.85	
2nd place, silver medalist(s)	Max Klauß	East Germany	7.83	
3rd place, bronze medalist(s)	Grzegorz Cybulski	Poland	7.81	
4	Jaroslav Brož	Czechoslovakia	7.69	
5	Phil Scott	Great Britain	7.48	
6	Rafael Blanquer	Spain	7.46	
7	Norbert Teipel	West Germany	7.33	
8	Milan Spasojević	Yugoslavia	7.27	
