= Jens Edv. Haugland =

Norwegian politician (1924–1981)

Jens Edvard Haugland (3 January 1924 – 26 September 1981) was a Norwegian politician for the Liberal Party and later the Liberal People's Party.

== Personal life ==
He was a brother of Eugen Haugland, and thus an uncle of Terje Haugland and granduncle of Hanne Haugland.

He was a son-in-law of athlete, politician and editor Otto Monsen.

== Career ==
Haugland was the mayor of Haugesund Municipality in 1964, 1965, 1968, 1969, 1972 and 1973. He alternated with Conservative mayors Stener Askeland and Olle Johan Eriksen, and is the last Haugesund mayor to date from the Liberal Party. He stood for parliamentary election in 1969 and 1973, the last time as second candidate on the Liberal People's Party ballot behind Ingvar Helle. He was among the leading figures in his party, as central board member and representative in Rogaland county council, but resigned his membership in 1978.

In 1972 he chaired Rogaland's county chapter of Ja til EF. He was also a deputy chair of Kommunalbanken and a corporate council member of Norsk Hydro.
