= Takayanagi =

Takayanagi (written: 高柳 lit "tall willow") is a Japanese surname. Notable people with the surname include:

- Issei Takayanagi (高柳 一誠, born 1986), Japanese footballer
- Kenjiro Takayanagi (高柳 健次郎, 1899–1990), Japanese television pioneer
- Masayuki Takayanagi (高柳 昌行, 1932–1991), Japanese jazz musician
- Masanobu Takayanagi (高柳 雅暢, born 1974), Japanese cinematographer
- Satoshi Takayanagi (高柳 慧, born 1938), Japanese long jumper
- Shigehito Takayanagi (高柳 滋仁), Japanese anime director
- Shoko Takayanagi (高柳 昌子, born 1954), Japanese volleyball player
- Tomoyo Takayanagi (高柳 知葉, born 1994), Japanese voice actress
- Yuko Takayanagi (高柳 裕子, born 1965), Japanese fencer

== Fictional characters ==
- Masataka Takayanagi (高柳 雅孝), a character in the manga series Tenjho Tenge

== See also ==
- 9080 Takayanagi, a main-belt asteroid
- Takayanagi, Niigata, a dissolved town in Kariwa District, Niigata, Japan
- Takayanagi Station, a railway station in Kashiwa, Chiba Prefecture, Japan
