= Kawagoe =

Kawagoe may refer to:

== Places ==
- Kawagoe, Saitama, a city in Saitama Prefecture, Japan
- Kawagoe, Mie, a town in Mie Prefecture, Japan
- Kawagoe Domain, a former domain of Japan

== Other uses ==
- Kawagoe (surname)
