= Boschert =

Boschert is a surname. Notable people with the surname include:

- David G. Boschert (1947–2011), American politician
- Reinhold Boschert (born 1947), German long jumper
- Sherry Boschert, American writer and activist

== See also ==
- Boschert Glacier, a glacier of Marie Byrd Land, Antarctica
