= Athletics at the 1975 Pan American Games – Men's long jump =

Men's long jump at the Pan American Games

The men's long jump event at the 1975 Pan American Games was held in Mexico City on 13 October.

== Medalists ==
Gold	Silver	Bronze
João Carlos de Oliveira; Brazil	Arnie Robinson; United States	Al Lanier; United States

== Results ==
=== Qualification ===
Qualification performance: 7.20

Rank	Name	Nationality	Result	Notes
1	Al Lanier	United States	7.98	Q
2	João Carlos de Oliveira	Brazil	7.65	Q
3	Arnie Robinson	United States	7.49	Q
4	Henry Jackson	Jamaica	7.34	Q
5	Rick Cuttell	Canada	7.32	Q
6	Ronaldo Lobato	Brazil	7.28	Q
7	Francisco Gómez	Cuba	7.27	Q
8	Milán Matos	Cuba	7.26	Q
9	George Swanston	Trinidad and Tobago	7.25	Q
9	Barry Boyd	Canada	7.25	Q
11	Dennis Trott	Bermuda	7.18	q
12	Fletcher Lewis	Bahamas	6.72	q

=== Final ===
Rank	Name	Nationality	#1	#2	#3	#4	#5	#6	Result	Notes
1st place, gold medalist(s)	João Carlos de Oliveira	Brazil	8.02	x	8.19	7.95	–	7.98	8.19	
2nd place, silver medalist(s)	Arnie Robinson	United States	7.94	7.63	x	–	7.45	x	7.94	
3rd place, bronze medalist(s)	Al Lanier	United States	x	x	7.60	7.91	–	–	7.91	
4	Milán Matos	Cuba							7.69	
5	Ronaldo Lobato	Brazil							7.67	
6	Francisco Gómez	Cuba							7.66	
7	Rick Cuttell	Canada	7.29	x	7.65	7.58	x	x	7.65	
8	George Swanston	Trinidad and Tobago							7.44	
9	Barry Boyd	Canada	7.22	6.99	6.92				7.22	
10	Henry Jackson	Jamaica							7.17	
11	Fletcher Lewis	Bahamas							7.15	
12	Dennis Trott	Bermuda							6.86	
