= Kobuszewski =

Kobuszewski (feminine: Kobuszewska) is a Polish-language surname. Notable people with the surname include:

- Jan Kobuszewski (disambiguation), multiple people
- Theresa Kobuszewski (1920–2005), American baseball player
