= Landgraf =

Landgraf is a surname. Notable people with the surname include:

- Alberto Landgraf (born 1980), Brazilian chef
- Arne Landgraf (born 1977), German rower
- Brooks Landgraf (born 1981), American politician
- Bruno Landgraf das Neves (born 1986), Brazilian athlete
- Dennis Landgraf (born 2001), German politician
- Franz Landgraf (1888–1944), German general
- John Landgraf (born 1962), American television executive
- Günther Landgraf (1928-2006), German physicist
- Kapulani Landgraf (born 1966), American artist
- Katharina Landgraf (born 1954), German politician
- Ken Landgraf (born 1950), American comic book illustrator
- Lois Landgraf, American politician
- Manuela Landgraf, German pair skater
- Niklas Landgraf (born 1996), German footballer
- Sigrid Landgraf (born 1969), German field hockey player
- Stanley I. Landgraf (1925–1997), American businessman
- Steffen Landgraf (born 1980), German athlete
- Werner Landgraf (born 1959), German astrophysicist
- Willi Landgraf (born 1968), German footballer

The German noble title Landgraf is Landgrave in English.
