= Kawazu =

Kawazu may refer to:

== Places ==
- Kawazu, Shizuoka, Japan
- Kawazu, Amarapura, Burma

== Other uses ==
- Kawazu (surname), a Japanese surname
