= Kawagoe (surname) =

Kawagoe (written: 川越) is a Japanese surname. Notable people with the surname include:

- Helen Kawagoe (1927–2020), American municipal official
- Hidetaka Kawagoe (川越 英隆; born 1973), Japanese baseball player
- Jun Kawagoe (川越 淳), Japanese anime director
- Takayoshi Kawagoe (川越 孝悦; born 1949), Japanese long jumper
