= Max Klauß =

East German long jumper

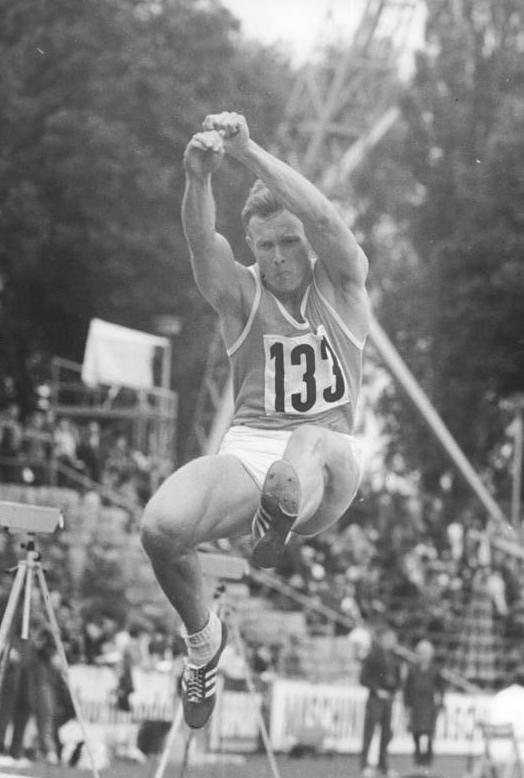
- Klauß in 1972

Personal information
- Nationality: East German
- Born: 27 July 1947 (age 78) Chemnitz, Germany
- Height: 185 cm (6 ft 1 in)
- Weight: 85 kg (187 lb)

Sport
- Sport: Athletics
- Event: long jump
- Club: SC Einheit Dresden
Medal record
Men's athletics
Representing East Germany
European Championships
Gold medal – first place	1971 Helsinki	Long jump
European Indoor Championships
Gold medal – first place	1972 Grenoble	Long jump
Silver medal – second place	1973 Rotterdam	Long jump
Bronze medal – third place	1974 Gothenburg	Long jump

Max Klauß (born 27 July 1947 in ) is a retired East German long jumper, who competed at the 1972 Summer Olympics.

== Biography ==
Klauss competed for the sports clubs SC Karl-Marx-Stadt and SC Einheit Dresden during his active career. He held the East German record in the long jump until his mark was surpassed by Klaus Beer in 1968.

Klauss finished second behind Lynn Davies in the long jump event at the British 1967 AAA Championships.

At the 1968 Olympic Games in Mexico City, he represented East Germany in the long jump competition.

== Achievements ==
Year	Tournament	Venue	Result	Extra
1966	European Championships	Budapest, Hungary	4th	Decathlon
1966	European Junior Championships	Odessa, Soviet Union	1st	Long jump
1969	European Championships	Athens, Greece	6th	Long jump
1971	European Championships	Helsinki, Finland	1st	Long jump
1972	European Indoor Championships	Grenoble, France	1st	Long jump
1972	Olympic Games	Munich, West Germany	6th	Long jump
1973	European Indoor Championships	Rotterdam, Netherlands	2nd	Long jump
1974	European Indoor Championships	Gothenburg, Sweden	3rd	Long jump
1974	European Championships	Rome, Italy	7th	Long jump
