= Clément Sagna =

Senegalese Athlete

Personal information
- Nationality: Senegalese
- Born: 4 October 1942
- Died: 2 March 2014 (aged 71)

Sport
- Sport: Athletics
- Event: Long jump

Clément Sagna (4 October 1942 – 2 March 2014) was a Senegalese athlete. He competed in the men's long jump at the 1968 Summer Olympics.
