= Bob Beamon =

American long jumper (born 1946)

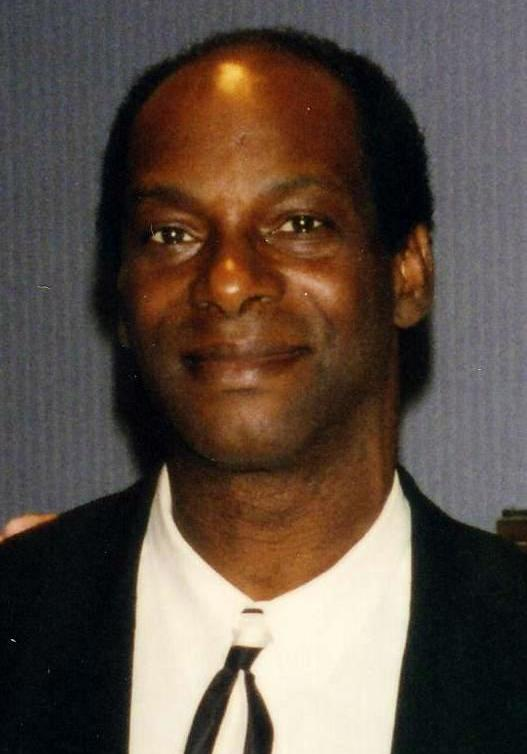
- Beamon in 1992

Personal information
- Nationality: American
- Born: Robert Beamon; August 29, 1946 (age 80) South Jamaica, Queens, New York City, U.S.
- Height: 6 ft 3 in (191 cm)
- Weight: 154 lb (70 kg)

Sport
- Country: United States
- Sport: Track and field
- Event: Long jump
- College team: The University of Texas at El Paso

Achievements and titles
- Personal best: 8.90 m OR (Mexico City 1968)
Medal record
Men's athletics
Representing the United States
Olympic Games
Gold medal – first place	1968 Mexico City	Long jump
Pan American Games
Silver medal – second place	1967 Winnipeg	Long jump

Robert Beamon (born August 29, 1946) is an American former track and field athlete, best known for his world record in the long jump at the Mexico City Olympics in 1968. By jumping 8.90 m (29 ft 2 1/4 in), he broke the existing record by a margin of 55 cm (21 3/4 in) and his world record stood for almost 23 years until it was broken in 1991 by Mike Powell. The jump is still the Olympic record and the second-longest in history unassisted by wind.

== Early life ==
Robert Beamon was born in South Jamaica, Queens, New York, to Naomi Brown Beamon and grew up in the New York Housing Authority's Jamaica Houses. When Beamon was eleven months old, his mother died from tuberculosis, and, as a result of his stepfather's incarceration, he was placed into the care of his maternal grandmother, Bessie.

When Beamon was attending Jamaica High School, Larry Ellis, a renowned track coach, discovered him. Beamon later became part of the All-American track and field team. Beamon began his college career at North Carolina Agricultural and Technical State University to be close to his ill grandmother. After her death, he transferred to the University of Texas at El Paso, where he received a track and field scholarship.

In 1965, Beamon set a national high school triple jump record and was second in the long jump. In 1967, he won the AAU indoor title and earned a silver medal at the Pan American Games, both in the long jump.

Beamon along with eleven other Black athletes were dropped from the University of Texas at El Paso (UTEP) track and field team the week following the assassination of Martin Luther King Jr. for participating in a boycott of competition with Brigham Young University because of The Church of Jesus Christ of Latter-day Saints' then-current racist policies. Despite losing his athletic scholarship, Beamon returned to UTEP to continue his studies after the Mexico City Olympics. Fellow Olympian Ralph Boston became his unofficial coach.

== 1968 Summer Olympics ==
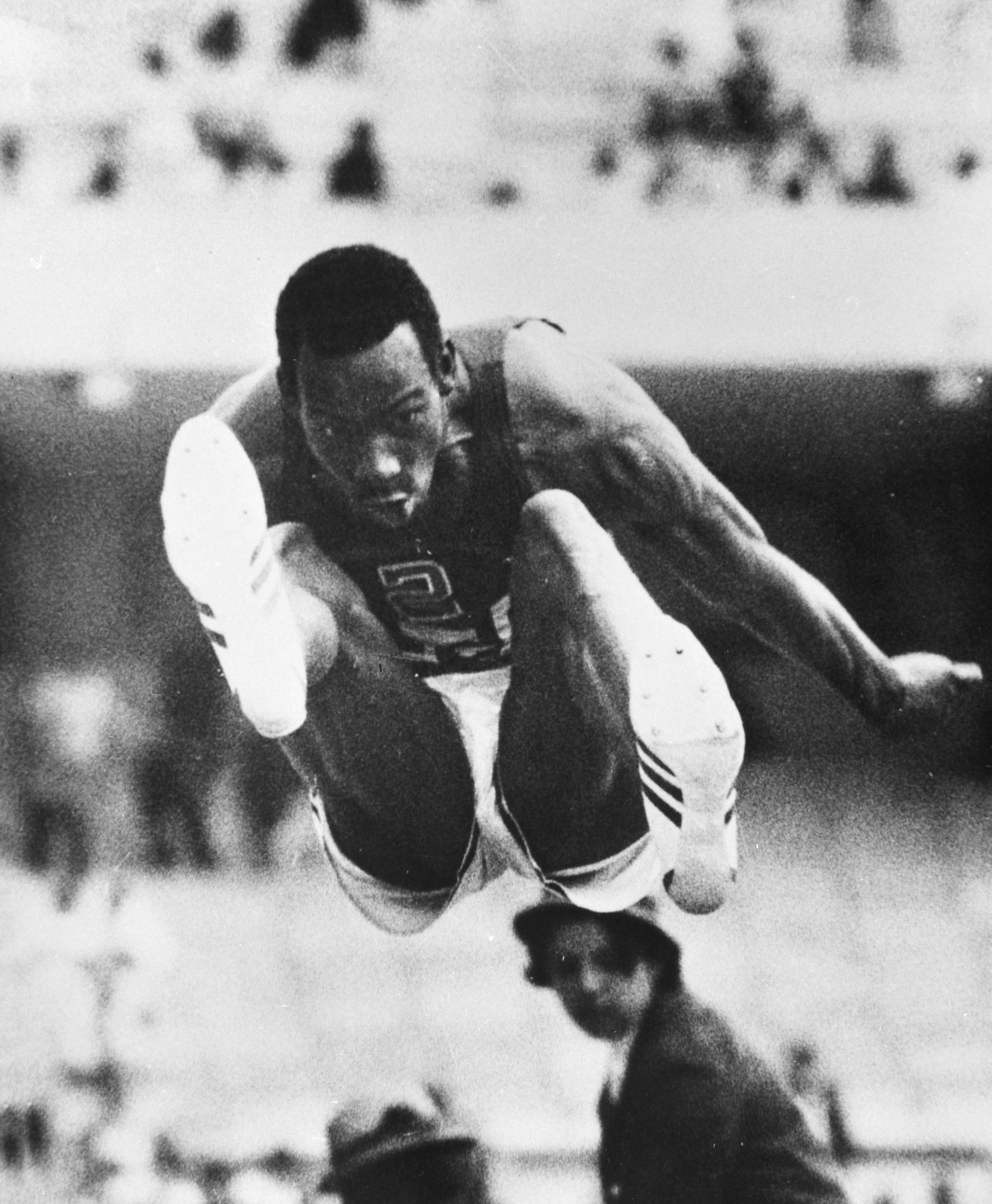
Bob Beamon setting a long jump world record at the 1968 Games in Mexico City

Beamon entered the 1968 Summer Olympics in Mexico City as the favorite to win the gold medal, having won 22 of the 23 meets he had competed in that year, including a career-best of 8.33 m (27 ft 3 3/4 in) and a world's best of 8.39 m (27 ft 6 1/4 in) that was ineligible for the record books due to excessive wind assistance. That year, he won the AAU and NCAA indoor long jump and triple jump titles and the AAU outdoor long jump title. He came close to missing the Olympic final, overstepping on his first two attempts in qualifying. With only one chance left, Beamon re-measured his approach run from a spot in front of the board and made a fair jump that advanced him to the final. There, he faced the two previous gold-medal winners, fellow American Ralph Boston (1960) and Lynn Davies of Great Britain (1964), and twice bronze medallist Igor Ter-Ovanesyan of the Soviet Union.

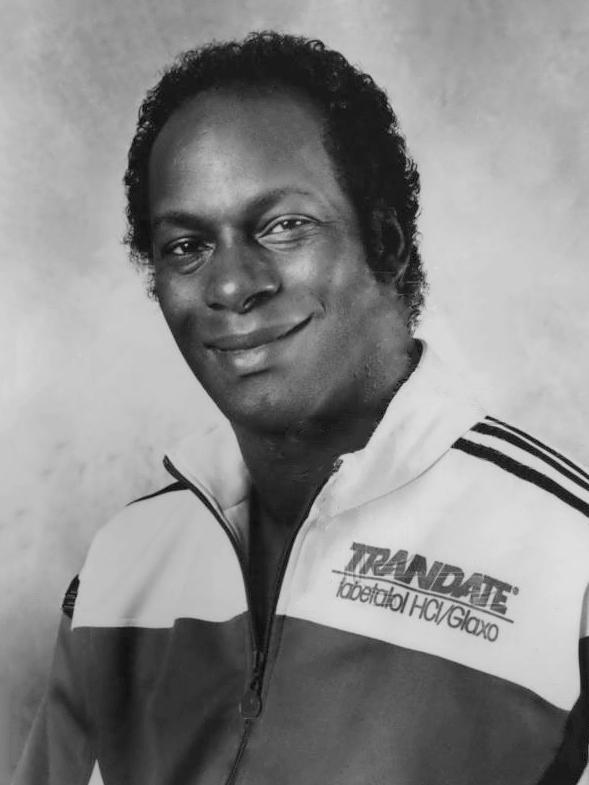
Bob Beamon in 1968 post-Gold Medal press photo

On October 18, Beamon set a world record for the long jump with a first jump of 8.90 m (29 ft 2 1/4 in), bettering the existing record by 55 cm (21 3/4 in). When the announcer called out the distance for the jump, Beamon—unfamiliar with metric measurements—still did not realize what he had done. When his teammate and coach Ralph Boston told him that he had broken the world record by nearly two feet, his legs gave way and an astonished and overwhelmed Beamon suffered a brief cataplexy attack brought on by the emotional shock, and collapsed to his knees, his body unable to support itself, placing his hands over his face. The defending Olympic champion Lynn Davies told Beamon, "You have destroyed this event", and in sports jargon, a new adjective—Beamonesque—came into use to describe spectacular feats.

Before Beamon's jump, the world record had been broken thirteen times since 1901, with an average increase of 6 cm (2 1/4 in) and the largest increase being 15 cm (6 in). In the years following the jump, the mark was considered unbeatable. It took 12 years for another human being to jump 28 feet, much less 29. Beamon's world record stood for 23 years until it was finally broken in 1991 when Mike Powell jumped 8.95 m (29 ft 4 1/4 in) at the World Championships in Tokyo, but Beamon's jump is still the Olympic record and 58 years later remains the second-longest wind-legal jump in history.

== Later life ==
Shortly after the Mexico City Olympics, Beamon was drafted by the Phoenix Suns in the 15th round of the 1969 NBA draft but never played in an NBA game. In 1972, he graduated from Adelphi University with a degree in sociology.

In 1977, Beamon became a track coach at U.S. International University (since a 2001 merger Alliant International University) in San Diego.

Beamon has worked in various roles to promote youth athleticism, including collaborations with former California governor Arnold Schwarzenegger and Beamon's work at the athletic programs of several universities. He is a graphic artist with work exhibited by the Art of the Olympians (AOTO), and was the former chief executive of the Art of the Olympians Museum in Fort Myers, Florida. In 2024, Beamon played percussion on a hip-hop jazz recording.

He is also a Global Ambassador for Special Olympics International.

== Honors ==
Beamon is in the National Track and Field Hall of Fame. When the United States Olympic Hall of Fame started to induct athletes in 1983, Beamon was one of the first inductees. There is a Bob Beamon Street in El Paso, Texas.

== Awards ==
- ANOC Gala Awards 2015: Outstanding Performance

Records
Preceded by (United States) Ralph Boston (Soviet Union) Igor Ter-Ovanesyan	Men's Long Jump World Record Holder; October 18, 1968 – August 30, 1991	Succeeded by (United States) Mike Powell
Awards
Preceded by (United States) Jim Ryun	Track & Field Athlete of the Year; 1968	Succeeded by (United States) Bill Toomey
Achievements
Preceded by (Soviet Union) Igor Ter-Ovanesyan	Men's Long Jump Best Year Performance; 1968	Succeeded by (Soviet Union) Igor Ter-Ovanesyan (Poland) Waldemar Stepien
