= Wariboko West =

Nigerian long jumper

Personal information
- Nationality: Nigerian
- Born: 19 August 1942 (age 83)

Sport
- Sport: Athletics
- Event: Long jump

Wariboko West (born 19 August 1942) is a Nigerian athlete. He competed in the men's long jump at the 1964 Summer Olympics.

West was an All-American jumper for the Washington Huskies track and field team, finishing 5th in the long jump at the 1964 NCAA University Division track and field championships.
