= Eugen Haugland =

Norwegian triple jumper (1912–1990)

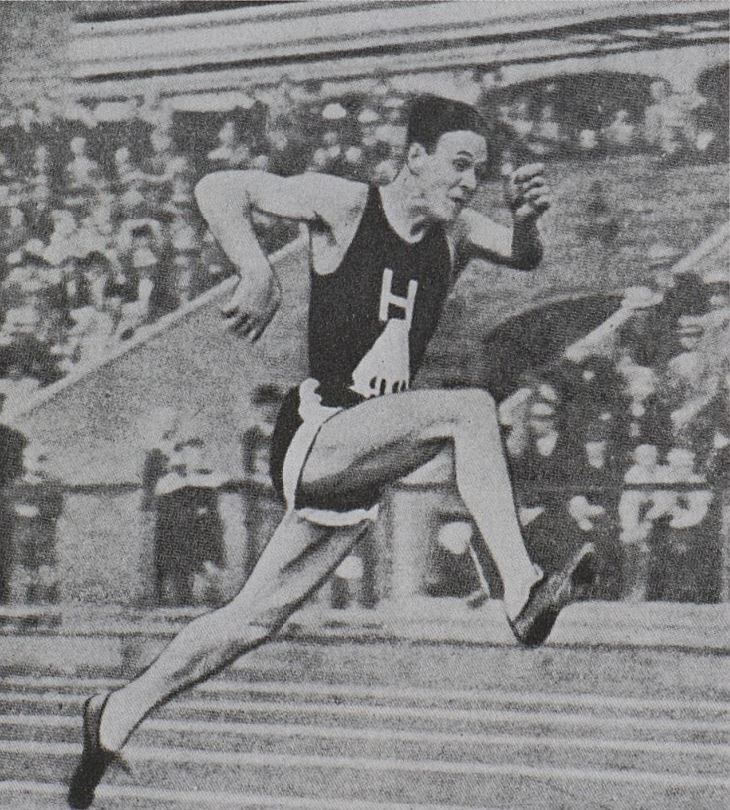
Haugland with a "H" in the 1930s.

Eugen Haugland (12 July 1912 – 21 October 1990) was a Norwegian triple jumper. He represented Haugesund IL.

He was a brother of Jens Edv. Haugland, father of Terje Haugland and grandfather of Hanne Haugland.

At the 1936 Summer Olympics he finished fourteenth in the triple jump final with a jump of 14.56 metres. He became Norwegian champion in 1931, 1933-1937 and 1948.

His personal best jump was 15.23 metres, achieved in August 1938 in Haugesund.
