= Martin Adouna =

Togolese long jumper (born 1943)

Personal information
- Nationality: Togolese
- Born: 31 December 1943 (age 82) Bassar, Togo

Sport
- Sport: Athletics
- Event: Long jump

Martin Natchaba Adouna (born 31 December 1943) is a Togolese former athlete. He competed in the men's long jump at the 1972 Summer Olympics.
