= Haugesund IL =

Norwegian sports club

- Full name: Haugesund Idrettslag
- Founded: 1906
- Ground: Haugesund stadion Haugesund

Haugesund Idrettslag is a Norwegian athletics club from Haugesund, founded in 1906.

Its most prominent members are long-distance runners Susanne Wigene, Karl Johan Rasmussen and Bente Landøy as well as jumpers Eugen Haugland, Terje Haugland and Hanne Haugland. The latter are all related.
