= Jan Kobuszewski =

Jan Kobuszewski is the name of:

- Jan Kobuszewski (actor) (born 1934), Polish actor and comedian
- Jan Kobuszewski (athlete) (born 1947), Polish long jumper
