= Antanas Vaupšas =

Lithuanian athlete (1936–2017)

Antanas Algimantas Vaupšas
Personal information
- Nationality: Lithuanian
- Born: 20 May 1936 Taručiai, Lithuania
- Died: 14 December 2017 (aged 81) Vilnius, Lithuania

Sport
- Sport: Athletics
- Events: Long jump, high jump, triple jump

Antanas Vaupšas (20 May 1936 – 14 December 2017) was a Lithuanian athlete. He competed in the men's long jump at the 1964 Summer Olympics, representing the Soviet Union, finishing in 14th place with a jump of 7.43 meters.
