= Michel Charland =

Canadian athlete (born 1945)

Personal information
- Born: 1 February 1945 (age 81) Montreal, Quebec, Canada

Sport
- Sport: Athletics
- Event: Long jump

Michel Charland (born 1 February 1945) is a Canadian athlete. He competed in the men's long jump at the 1968 Summer Olympics.
