= Hiroomi Yamada =

Japanese long jumper

Personal information
- Nationality: Japanese
- Born: 4 March 1942 Tokyo, Japan
- Died: 21 October 1981 (aged 39) Gyeongju, Korea
- Height: 181 cm (5 ft 11 in)
- Weight: 74 kg (163 lb)

Sport
- Sport: Athletics
- Event: long jump

Hiroomi Yamada (山田 宏臣, Yamada Hiroomi; 4 March 1942 – 21 October 1981) was a Japanese long jumper who competed in the 1964 Summer Olympics and in the 1968 Summer Olympics.

Yamada was the first Asian to jump eight metres, doing so with a leap 8.01 at Odawara on June 7, 1970.

Yamada twice finished second at the British AAA Championships, behind Lynn Davies at the 1968 AAA Championships and behind Alan Lerwill at the 1970 AAA Championships.
