= Anthony Chong =

Malaysian long jumper

Personal information
- Nationality: Malaysian
- Born: 26 October 1940 (age 85)

Sport
- Sport: Athletics
- Event: Long jump

Anthony Chong (born 26 November 1940) is a Malaysian athlete. He competed in the men's long jump at the 1968 Summer Olympics.
