= Steffen Landgraf =

German track and field athlete and scientist

Personal information
- Born: 26 August 1980 (age 45) Berlin, Germany
- Height: 190 cm (6 ft 3 in)
Medal record
Men's Athletics
Representing Germany
German U18-Championships
Gold medal – first place	1997 Lüdenscheid	4x100m
German U20-Championships
Gold medal – first place	1999 Duisburg	4x100m
Bronze medal – third place	1999 Duisburg	Long Jump
German U23-Championships
Gold medal – first place	2001 Schweinfurt	4x100m
Silver medal – second place	2001 Schweinfurt	Long Jump
German Indoor Championships
Gold medal – first place	2001 Dortmund	4x200m
Bronze medal – third place	2001 Dortmund	4x400m
German Multi-Events Championships
Gold medal – first place	2004 Vaterstetten	Decathlon Team

Steffen Landgraf (born 26 August 1980 in Berlin) is a former German long jumper / decathlete and an active scientist in forensic psychiatry and clinical neuroscience.

== Athletic career ==
Between 1998 and 2004, Steffen competed for the LG Nike Berlin. In 2001, he won the German championship title with the 4 × 200 m relay at the Deutsche Leichtathletik-Hallenmeisterschaften 2001|German Indoor Championships in Dortmund (together with Ronny Ostwald, Ralf Riester und Kofi Amoah Prah). He also won the bronze medal with the 4 × 400 m relay in Dortmund 2001. His is also a German decathlon team champion, winning at the German outdoor multi-events championships in Vaterstetten in 2004 (together with the 2006 Indoor Heptathlon World Champion André Niklaus und Marian Geisler).

On 4 June 2001 he jumped his career best of 7.84m (25 ft 8 1/2in) in Wesel, Germany, and qualified for the U23-European Championships in Amsterdam, where he finished 15th. In 2001, he won the German U23 title in the 4 × 100 m relay (together with Tobias Samberg, Kai Doskoszynski und Ralf Riester) and the U23 Silver medal in the long jump at the German U23-Championship in Schweinfurt. He also was German junior champion with the 4 × 100 m relay at the German U20-Championships in Duisburg in 1999 and at the German U18-Championships in Lüdenscheid in 1997. He won the bronze medal in the long jump in Duisburg in 1999 and placed 4th in the long jump at the German U20-Championships in Berlin in 1998 and 8th at the German U18-Championships in Lüdenscheid in 1997.

During his active time, Steffen Landgraf was coached by Klaus Beer, the former Olympic Silver medalist in the long jump in Mexico City in 1969, and Rainer Pottel, the former Olympian in the decathlon in Moscow in 1980.

From 2001 to 2004, Steffen was part of the Track and Field Team at the University of Minnesota, with whom he won the "Outdoor Big Ten Championships". In the 2003 Big Ten Conference Meeting, he was elected the runner-up in the long jump, placing second. During his time in Minneapolis, he was trained by Phil Lundin and former NCAA decathlon champion Mario Sategna.

In 2004, Steffen Landgraf ended his Track and Field career. Today, he is a voluntary coach at the LG Telis Finanz Regensburg.

Steffen Landgraf is the son of Monika Zehrt, the German two-time Olympic champion from Munich 1972 and former world record holder in the 400m dash and the 4 × 400 m relay.

== Scientific Work ==
Steffen Landgraf went to Coubertin Gymnasium in Berlin until 2000. From 2001 to 2004, he studied psychology and Spanish in the B.A. honors' program of the University of Minnesota, USA. From 2004 to 2007, he studied psychology at Humboldt-Universität zu Berlin, Germany.

In 2010, he obtained his doctoral degree ("summa cum laude") in clinical neuroscience in a binational Ph.D. program from the Sorbonne Université Paris, France, and Humboldt-Universität zu Berlin. His supervisors were Marie-Odile Krebs (F) and Elke van der Meer (GER). The topic of his dissertation was: "Cognitive markers in early psychosis: reference frames in spatial cognition and visual scanning-strategies as stage markers in schizophrenia".

Three years later at the age of 33 years, Steffen obtained assistant professorship (Habilitation) at Humboldt-Universität zu Berlin. His habilitation topic was: "The evolution of problems lies within the acting individual". He is author of multiple international English peer-reviewed scientific articles on topics of schizophrenia, creativity, and intelligence. His theory on the association between visual dysfunctions and the risk of developing psychotic symptoms was published in the Open-Access-Journal Frontiers in Psychology in 2013. The "Protection Against Schizophrenia" Model gained large scientific attention, because it postulates mechanisms of how congenital blindness protects against the development of psychotic symptoms and schizophrenia.

== Awards ==
Steffen Landgraf has obtained numerous awards for his scientific achievements. The World Federation of Societies of Biological Psychiatry and the International Symposium on Schizophrenia. awarded Steffen Landgraf their prestigious Young Scientist Awards in Paris, France, 2009 and in Berne, Switzerland, 2010, respectively. Since 2012, Steffen Landgraf works as a permanent lecturer at the Department of Forensic Psychiatry and Psychotherapy at the Universität Regensburg at the Bezirksklinikum Regensburg.

== Personal Bests ==
- Long Jump: 7.84m (25 ft 8 1/2in) (Wesel, Germany, 4 June 2001)
- Long Jump (Indoors): 7.43m (24 ft 4 1/2in) (Champaign, Illinois, USA, 1 March 2003)
- Decathlon: 6555 points (College Station, Texas, USA, 18/19 March 2004)
- Heptathlon (Indoors): 5103 points (Ann Arbor, Michigan, USA, 28/29 February 2004)

== Selected publications ==
- Landgraf, S.; Osterheider (2013). "To see or not to see: that is the question." The "Protection-Against-Schizophrenia" model: evidence from congenital blindness and visuo-cognitive aberrations". Frontiers in Psychology. 4: 352. doi:10.3389/fpsyg.2013.00352. PMC 3696841. PMID 23847557.
- Landgraf, S.; et al. (2012). "Cognitive Identity in Schizophrenia. Vision, Space, and Body Perception from prodrome to syndrome". Current Psychiatry Reviews. 8 (2): 119–139. doi:10.2174/1573400511208020119.
- Landgraf, S.; et al. (2011). "Inflexible information acquisition strategies mediate visuo-spatial reasoning in stabilized schizophrenia patients". The World Journal of Biological Psychiatry. 12 (8): 608–619. doi:10.3109/15622975.2010.544329. PMID 21288070. S2CID 24148331.
- Landgraf, S.; et al. (2011). "Visuo-spatial cognition in schizophrenia: Confirmation of a preference for local information processing". Schizophrenia Research. 127 (1–3): 163–170. doi:10.1016/j.schres.2010.11.027. PMID 21186098. S2CID 23962707.
- Landgraf, S.; et al. (2010). "Real world referencing and schizophrenia: are we experiencing the same reality?". Neuropsychologia. 48 (10): 2922–2930. doi:10.1016/j.neuropsychologia.2010.05.034. PMID 20540956. S2CID 207236236.
- Landgraf, S.; et al. (2008). "Memory-guided saccade abnormalities in schizophrenic patients and their full biological siblings". Psychological Medicine. 38 (6): 861–870. doi:10.1017/s0033291707001912. PMID 17976251. S2CID 29229990.
