= Alain Levèvre =

French long jumper

Alain Lefèvre
Personal information
- Nationality: French
- Born: 6 July 1942 (age 84)

Sport
- Sport: Athletics
- Event: Long jump

Alain Lefèvre (born 6 July 1942) is a French athlete. He competed in the men's long jump at the 1964 Summer Olympics.
