= Sunday Akpata =

Nigerian long jumper (1937–2024)

Personal information
- Nationality: Nigerian
- Born: 16 February 1937 Benin City, British Nigeria
- Died: 4 April 2024 (aged 87) Lagos, Nigeria

Sport
- Sport: Athletics
- Event: Long jump

Solomon Sunday Osayande (“Sonny Ba”) Akpata (16 February 1937 – 4 April 2024) was a Nigerian athlete. He competed in the men's long jump at the 1964 Summer Olympics.
