= Samuel Cruz (athlete) =

Puerto Rican athlete

Personal information
- Full name: David Samuel Cruz
- Nationality: Puerto Rican
- Born: 18 December 1943 Villalba, Puerto Rico
- Died: 24 April 1975 Rio Piedras, Puerto Rico
- Height: 1.90 m (6 ft 3 in)
- Weight: 73 kg (161 lb)

Sport
- Sport: Athletics
- Event: Long jump

David Samuel Cruz (18 December 1943 – April 1975) was a Puerto Rican athlete. He competed in the men's long jump at the 1964 Summer Olympics.

== International competitions ==
Year	Competition	Venue	Position	Event	Notes
Representing Puerto Rico
1964	Olympic Games	Tokyo, Japan	30th (q)	Long jump	6.74 m
1966	Central American and Caribbean Games	San Juan, Puerto Rico	–	Long jump	NM
1970	Central American and Caribbean Games	Panama City, Panama	5th	Long jump	7.40 m

== Personal bests ==
- Long jump – 7.56 (1969)
