= Linus Rebmann =

Swiss long jumper

Personal information
- Nationality: Swiss
- Born: 4 April 1947 (age 79)

Sport
- Sport: Athletics
- Event: Long jump

Linus Rebmann (born 4 April 1947) is a Swiss athlete. He competed in the men's long jump at the 1972 Summer Olympics.
