= Preston Carrington =

American former long jumper

Preston Morrand Carrington (born June 12, 1949) is an American former long jumper who competed in the 1972 Summer Olympics. He ran collegiately for Wichita State University.

He set his personal best in the qualifying round of the Olympics, 8.22 m (26 ft 11 1/2 in), which would have won a silver medal if it were in the final.
