= Karl Johan Rasmussen =

Norwegian long-distance runner

Karl Johan Rasmussen (born 10 October 1973) is a Norwegian long-distance runner who specialized in marathon races. He has represented SK Vidar, Bislett FIK and Haugesund IL.

He finished eighth at the 2002 European Championships in Munich, having been in silver medal position until the last three kilometres of the race. He later competed at the 2003 World Championships, 2003 IAAF World Half Marathon Championships and 2006 European Championships without much success. He never participated in the Summer Olympics. He became Norwegian champion in 10,000 m in 1998, 2001, 2003 and 2006 and in half marathon in 1997, 1998, 2001 and 2002.

He is currently teaching social science, history and gymnastics classes at Skeisvang Videregående Skole in Haugesund, Norway.

== Achievements ==
- All results regarding marathon, unless stated otherwise

Year	Competition	Venue	Position	Notes
Representing Norway
2002	European Championships	Munich, Germany	8th	2:14:00
2003	World Championships	Paris, France	33rd	2:16:00
2006	European Championships	Gothenburg, Sweden	38th	2:30:05

== Personal bests ==
- 10,000 metres - 28:38.89 min (2002) - fifteenth among Norwegian 10,000 m runners.
- Half marathon - 1:03:22 hrs (1998) - fourteenth among Norwegian half marathon runners.
- Marathon - 2:14:00 hrs (2002) - thirteenth among Norwegian marathon runners.
