= Milán Matos =

Cuban long jumper

Personal information
- Full name: Milán Matos León
- Nationality: Cuban
- Born: 12 November 1949 Guantánamo, Cuba
- Died: 16 March 2018 (aged 68)
- Height: 1.75 m (5 ft 9 in)
- Weight: 70 kg (154 lb)

Sport
- Sport: Athletics
- Event: Long jump

Milán Matos León (12 November 1949 – 16 March 2018) was a Cuban athlete. He competed in the men's long jump at the 1972 Summer Olympics and the 1976 Summer Olympics.

His personal best in the event is 7.96 metres set in 1975.

== International competitions ==
Year	Competition	Venue	Position	Event	Notes
Representing Cuba
1971	Central American and Caribbean Championships	Kingston, Jamaica	5th	Long jump	7.18 m
1972	Olympic Games	Munich, West Germany	27th (q)	Long jump	7.47 m
1973	Central American and Caribbean Championships	Maracaibo, Venezuela	1st	Long jump	7.68 m
1973	Universiade	Moscow, Soviet Union	13th	Long jump	7.24 m
1974	Central American and Caribbean Games	Santo Domingo, Dominican Republic	2nd	Long jump	7.43 m
1975	Pan American Games	Mexico City, Mexico	4th	Long jump	7.69 m
1976	Olympic Games	Montreal, Canada	18th (q)	Long jump	7.57 m
1978	Central American and Caribbean Games	Medellín, Colombia	2nd	Long jump	7.77 m
