= Francisco Gómez (athlete) =

Cuban athlete (born 1957)

Personal information
- Nationality: Cuban
- Born: 7 February 1957 (age 69)
- Height: 169 cm (5 ft 6 1/2 in)
- Weight: 60 kg (130 lb)

Sport
- Sport: Sprinting
- Events: 100 metres, long jump

Francisco Gómez Hechavarría (born 7 February 1957) is a Cuban sprinter and long jumper. He competed in the men's 100 metres at the 1976 Summer Olympics.

At the 1974 Central American and Caribbean Games, Gómez won the bronze medal in the long jump.

At the 1976 Olympics, Gómez accused Olympic gold medalist Alberto Juantorena of sabotaging the Cuban national team by putting talcum powder on their beds in the Olympic village, a claim that Juantorena did not deny. The prank caused sprinter Silvio Leonard to trip and fall on glass requiring stitches, but for accusing Juantorena, the Cuban national team disciplined Gómez by leaving him in Montreal.

Gómez Hechavarría is from the Palma Soriano city of Cuba.

== International competitions ==
Year	Competition	Venue	Position	Event	Notes
Representing Cuba
1974	Central American and Caribbean Games	Santo Domingo, Dominican Republic	3rd	Long jump	7.41 m
1975	Pan American Games	Mexico City, Mexico	6th	Long jump	7.66 m
1976	Olympic Games	Montreal, Canada	13th (qf)	100 m	10.49
1976	Olympic Games	Montreal, Canada	5th	4 × 100 m relay	39.01
