= Kawazu (surname) =

Kawazu (written: 河津 or 川津) is a Japanese surname. Notable people with the surname include:

- Akitoshi Kawazu (河津 秋敏; born 1962), Japanese video game designer
- Koro Kawazu (河津 光朗; born 1940), Japanese long jumper
- Ryoichi Kawazu (河津 良一; born 1992), Japanese footballer
- Yasuhiko Kawazu (川津 泰彦; born 1966), Japanese voice actor
- Yūsuke Kawazu (川津 祐介; 1935–2022), Japanese actor
