= Gérard Ugolini =

French long jumper (1949–2025)

Personal information
- Nationality: French
- Born: 9 February 1949 Joeuf, France
- Died: 7 November 2025 (aged 76) Arnay-le-Duc, France

Sport
- Sport: Athletics
- Event: Long jump

Gérard Ugolini (9 February 1949 – 7 November 2025) was a French athlete. He competed in the men's long jump at the 1968 Summer Olympics.

Ugolini died on 7 November 2026, at the age of 76.
