= Hanne Haugland =

Norwegian high jumper (born 1967)

Personal information
- Nationality: Norwegian
- Born: 14 December 1967 (age 58) Haugesund, Norway
- Height: 183 cm (6 ft 0 in)
- Weight: 63 kg (139 lb)

Sport
- Sport: Athletics
- Event: high jump
- Club: IF Minerva, Lillestrøm
Medal record
Women's Athletics
Representing Norway
World Championships
Gold medal – first place	1997 Athens	High jump
World Indoor Championships
Bronze medal – third place	1997 Paris	High jump
European Indoor Championships
Silver medal – second place	1989 The Hague	High jump

Hanne Birgit Haugland (born 14 December 1967 in Haugesund) is a former Norwegian high jumper. She represented the clubs Haugesund IL, IL i BUL, SK Vidar and IF Minerva during her senior career.

== Biography ==
In her early international career she finished eleventh at the 1987 European Indoor Championships and won the British WAAA Championships title in the high jump event at the 1987 WAAA Championships.

Haugland won the 1989 World Indoor Championships and was thirteenth at the 1988 European Indoor Championships. Her first international medal came at the 1989 European Indoor Championships where she won a silver with a jump of 1.96 metres.

She then finished fourth at the 1990 European Indoor Championships, eighth at the 1990 European Championships, twelfth at the 1991 World Indoor Championships and the 1992 European Indoor Championships, ninth at the 1993 World Championships, sixth at the 1994 European Indoor Championships, fifth at the 1994 European Championships ninth at the 1995 World Indoor Championships, sixth at the 1995 World Championships and eighth at the 1996 Summer Olympics.

In 1997 she won the bronze medal at the World Indoor Championships with 2.00 metres and the gold medal at the World Championships with 1.99 metres. Her personal best jump of 2.01 metres was achieved in August 1997 at the Weltklasse Zürich meet. This is the current Norwegian record. Furthermore, she cleared 1.95 metres or more 21 times.

She became Norwegian high jump champion in the years 1986–1987, 1989–1990, 1992–1997 and 1999–2000. In addition she took the national title in long jump in 1989, 1990 and 1995 and triple jump in 1994.

Haugland went on to coach several Norwegian high jumpers, including Anne Gerd Eieland. She is married to fellow former high jumper Håkon Särnblom. Her grandfather Eugen Haugland and father Terje Haugland competed in international athletics as well.

== Achievements ==
Year	Competition	Venue	Position	Notes
Representing Norway
1987	European Indoor Championships	Liévin, France	11th	1.88 m
1987	World Championships	Rome, Italy	19th (q)	1.85 m
1988	European Indoor Championships	Budapest, Hungary	13th	1.80 m
1989	European Indoor Championships	The Hague, Netherlands	2nd	1.96 m
1989	World Indoor Championships	Budapest, Hungary	11th	1.88 m
1990	European Indoor Championships	Glasgow, Scotland	4th	1.91 m
1990	European Championships	Split, Yugoslavia	8th	1.89 m
1991	World Indoor Championships	Seville, Spain	12th	1.88 m
1992	European Indoor Championships	Genoa, Italy	12th	1.88 m
1993	World Championships	Stuttgart, Germany	9th	1.88 m (1.93 m)
1994	European Indoor Championships	Paris, France	6th	1.93 m
1994	European Championships	Helsinki, Finland	5th	1.93 m
1995	World Indoor Championships	Barcelona, Spain	9th	1.93 m
1995	World Championships	Gothenburg, Sweden	6th	1.96 m
1996	Olympic Games	Atlanta, United States	8th	1.96 m
1997	World Indoor Championships	Paris, France	3rd	2.00 m
1997	World Championships	Athens, Greece	1st	1.99 m
2000	Olympic Games	Sydney, Australia	15th (q)	1.92 m

Notes: Results with a Q, indicate overall position in qualifying round.

Awards
Preceded by Vebjørn Rodal	Norwegian Sportsperson of the Year; 1997; With: Nils Arne Eggen	Succeeded by Bjørn Dæhlie
