= Carlo Molinaris =

Italian former long jumper

Personal information
- Full name: Piercarlo Molinaris
- National team: Italy: 8 (1971–1975)
- Born: 19 September 1951 (age 74) Santo Stefano Belbo, Italy

Sport
- Sport: Athletics
- Event: Long jump
- Club: Virtus Asti

Achievements and titles
- Personal best: Long jump: 7.65 m (1974)

Carlo Molinaris (born 19 September 1951) is a former Italian long jumper.

== Career ==
Two-time national champion at senior level in long jump in 1973 and 1974.

== Achievements ==
Year	Competition	Venue	Rank	Event	Measure	Notes
1973	Universiade	(Soviet Union) Moscow	8th	Long jump	7.49 m	
1975	Mediterranean Games	(Algeria) Algiers	6th	Long jump	7.29 m	
1975	Universiade	(Italy) Rome	8th	Long jump	7.54 m	
