= Koro Kawazu =

Japanese long jumper

Personal information
- Nationality: Japanese
- Born: 25 November 1940 (age 84)

Sport
- Sport: Athletics
- Event: Long jump

Koro Kawazu (河津 光朗, Kawazu Kōrō; born 25 November 1940) is a Japanese athlete. He competed in the men's long jump at the 1964 Summer Olympics.
