= Igor Ter-Ovanesyan =

Soviet and Russian long jumper and coach

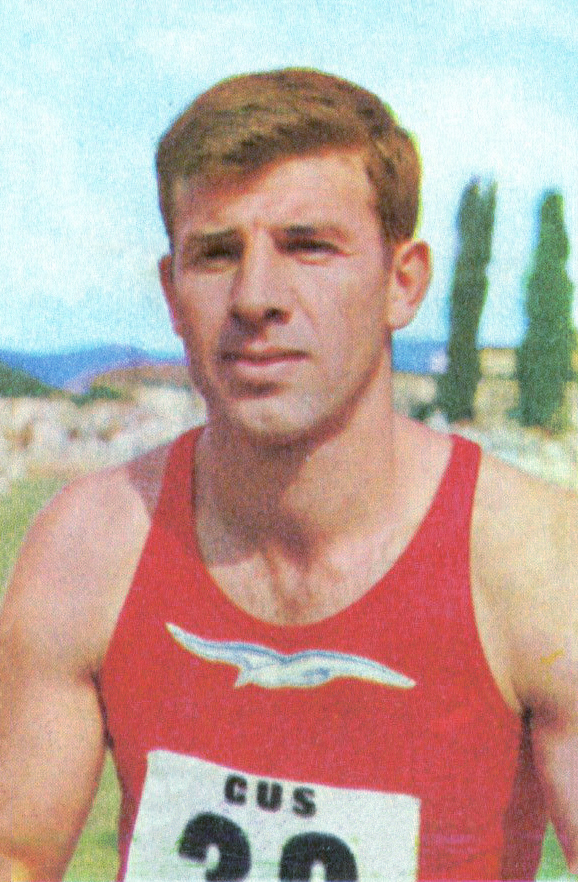
- Ter-Ovanesyan in the 1960s

Personal information
- Native name: І́гор Ара́мович Тер-Ованеся́н
- Born: 19 May 1938 (age 88) Kyiv, Ukrainian SSR, Soviet Union
- Height: 1.86 m (6 ft 1 in)
- Weight: 78 kg (172 lb)

Sport
- Sport: Long jump
- Club: Burevestnik

Achievements and titles
- Personal best: 8.35 m (1967)
Medal record
Men's athletics
Representing Soviet Union
Olympic Games
Bronze medal – third place	1960 Rome	Long jump
Bronze medal – third place	1964 Tokyo	Long jump
European Championships
Gold medal – first place	1958 Stockholm	Long jump
Gold medal – first place	1962 Belgrade	Long jump
Gold medal – first place	1969 Athens	Long jump
Silver medal – second place	1966 Budapest	Long jump
Silver medal – second place	1971 Helsinki	Long jump
European Indoor Championships
Silver medal – second place	1971 Sofia	Long jump
Summer Universiade
Gold medal – first place	1961 Sofia	Long jump
Gold medal – first place	1961 Sofia	4x100m relay
Gold medal – first place	1963 Porto Alegre	Long jump
Gold medal – first place	1965 Budapest	Long jump
Silver medal – second place	1965 Budapest	4x100m relay

Igor Aramovich Ter-Ovanesyan (Ukrainian: І́гор Ара́мович Тер-Ованеся́н, romanized: Íhor Arámovych Ter-Ovanesián, Russian: Игорь Арамович Тер-Ованесян; born 19 May 1938) is a Soviet and Russian former long jumper and coach, of Armenian descent. Competing for the Soviet Union, he was a five-time European and two-time Olympic medalist in this event. In 1985, he was awarded the Order of the Badge of Honour.

== Early life ==
Ter-Ovanesyan was born in Kyiv to an Armenian discus thrower, Aram Avetisovich Ter-Ovanesyan, and a Ukrainian volleyball player, Valentina Ilinskaya. His parents met at the Kyiv State Institute of Physical Education, where they both taught sports-related topics.

== Career ==
Ter-Ovanesyan took up athletics when he was 15, and within two years was included to the Soviet national team. Ter-Ovanesyan trained at Burevestnik, first in Kiev, later in Lviv, and then in Moscow. He holds a PhD and a title of Professor at the Department of Athletics, Moscow State Academy of Physical Culture. He published several sports-related books in Russian.

Ter-Ovanesyan won Olympic bronze medals at the 1960 Summer Olympics in Rome – with a jump of 8.04 meters – and at the 1964 Summer Olympics in Tokyo – with a jump of 7.99 meters. He also competed at the 1956, 1968 and 1972 Olympics and finished fourth in 1968. At the European Championships he won outdoor gold medals in 1958, 1962 and 1969, and an indoor silver medal in 1971. Ter-Ovanesyan became the first European long jumper to break the 8 meter barrier. He broke the European long jump record eight times and the world long jump record twice. In 1963, he won the United States Indoor Championships. Ter-Ovanesyan had the annual world's best long jumps in 1962, 1966, 1967 and 1969.

After retiring from competitions, Ter-Ovanesyan became a national coach. His pupils included Ineta Radēviča, Valery Podluzhny, Vilma Bardauskienė and Tatyana Kolpakova. In 1983–1989 he headed the Soviet track and field team.

In February 2017, Ter-Ovanesyan held a press conference in Moscow, during which he said that East German successes due to state-sponsored doping are legitimate results of "good pharmacology" and should not be condemned.

== Results ==
=== Olympics ===
- 1960 Rome: Bronze with 8.04 m behind Ralph Boston (USA) with 8.12 m and Bo Roberson (USA) with 8.11 m.
- 1964 Tokyo: Bronze with 7.99 m behind Great Britain's Lynn Davies with 8.07 m and Ralph Boston (USA) with 8.03 m
- 1968 Mexico: Fourth with 8.12 m behind Bob Beamon (USA) with 8.90 m, Klaus Beer (GDR) with 8.19 m and Ralph Boston (USA) with 8.16 m.

=== European Championships ===
- 1958 Stockholm: Gold, 7.81 m
- 1962 Belgrade: Gold, 8.19 m
- 1966 Budapest: Silver, 7.88 m
- 1969 Athens: Gold, 8.17 m
- 1971 Helsinki: Silver, 7.91 m

=== World records ===
- 8.31 metres on 10 July 1962 in Yerevan
- 8.35 metres on 19 October 1967 in Mexico City

== Defection target ==
On the eve of the Rome Olympics, athlete Dave Sime of the USA was approached by the Central Intelligence Agency and recruited to help secure Ter-Ovanesyan's defection. Sime approached Ter-Ovanesyan and introduced him to a CIA agent in Rome, but that agent's manner frightened Ter-Ovanesyan off and he did not defect.

== Personal life ==
Ter-Ovanesyan has been married twice. His first marriage was to Margarita Yurievna Yemelyanova. They had a son, Igor (b. 1963), and a daughter, Karen (b. 1967). His second marriage was to Olga Arturovna Klein. In 1982, they had a daughter, Jana Igorevna Klein.

== Notes ==
Records
Preceded by Ralph Boston; Ralph Boston	Men's Long Jump World Record Holder; 10 June 1962 – 12 September 1964; 19 October 1967 – 18 October 1968	Succeeded by Ralph Boston; Bob Beamon
Sporting positions
Preceded by Ralph Boston; Ralph Boston; Bob Beamon	Men's Long Jump Best Year Performance; 1962; 1966–1967; 1969	Succeeded by Ralph Boston; Bob Beamon; Josef Schwarz
