= Helen Kawagoe =

American community leader

- Born: Helen Sadako Fukutaki; August 30, 1927; Pasadena, California, U.S.
- Died: April 6, 2020 (age 92); Gardena, California, U.S.
- Occupations: Community leader, elected official
- Known for: National president, Japanese American Citizens League

Helen Sadako Kawagoe (August 30, 1927 – April 6, 2020) was an American community leader and city official. She was national president of the Japanese American Citizens League, and city clerk of Carson, California.

== Early life ==
Kawagoe was born in Pasadena, California, one of the thirteen children of Suezo Fukutaki and Ayako Hira Fukutaki. Her parents were immigrants from Okayama Prefecture, and ran a laundry. As an American of Japanese parentage, she was incarcerated at the Gila River War Relocation Center in Arizona from 1942 to 1945, along with her widowed mother and siblings.

== Career ==
Kawagoe and her husband ran a flower nursery in Carson, from 1962 to 1971. She served on the city's planning commission and was vice-president of the Chamber of Commerce before she was elected and re-elected to ten terms as city clerk of Carson, from 1974 to 2011. She was a delegate to the National Women's Conference in 1977. She was president of the City Clerks department of the League of California Cities from 1979 to 1980, president of the International Institute of Municipal Clerks from 1986 to 1987, and president of Asian Pacific American Municipal Officials (APAMO) in 1996. From 1996 to 2000, Kawagoe was the elected national president of the Japanese American Citizens League. From 2004 to 2011, she was a member of the National League of Cities' advisory council.

In 1994 Kawagoe was named an Outstanding Woman of Los Angeles County, and Municipal Clerk of the Year by the California Municipal Clerks Association. In 2013, the City Council chambers of Carson were named for Kawagoe.

The Japanese government named Kawagoe as a recipient of the Order of the Precious Crown, Apricot, in 1993. She served on the boards of the Japanese American National Museum, the CSU Dominguez Hills Foundation, and the National Japanese American Memorial Foundation.

== Personal life ==
Helen Fukutaki married Takeshi Kawagoe in 1947. Their only daughter, Kathryn, died from brain cancer in childhood. Her husband died in 1992, and Kawagoe remarried to Stanley H. Yanase in 2005. Her second husband died in 2007. Kawagoe survived a debilitating stroke in 2011, and died in 2020, at the age of 92, at a nursing home in Gardena.
