= Jean-François Bonhème =

French long jumper

Personal information
- Born: 2 July 1949 (age 76) Paris, France

Sport
- Sport: Track and field
Medal record
Representing France
European Indoor Championships
Gold medal – first place	1974 Gothenburg	Long jump
Summer Universiade
Silver medal – second place	1973 Moscow	Long jump

Jean-François Bonhème (born 12 July 1949) is a French male former track and field athlete who competed in the long jump. His greatest achievement was a gold medal at the 1974 European Athletics Indoor Championships, which he won in a career best of 8.17 m (26 ft 9 1/2 in).

Born in Paris, he was a member of Paris Université Club and trained under Hugues Raffin-Peyloz. In other international competitions, he won at the 1973 European Cup Semi Final and was runner-up at the Universiade that same year.

He was a five-time national champion in the long jump, winning three titles at the French Athletics Championships and a further two at the French Indoor Athletics Championships.

== International competitions ==
Year	Competition	Venue	Position	Event	Notes
1970	Universiade	Turin, Italy	11th	Long jump	7.47 m
1973	European Cup Semi Final	Nice, France	1st	Long jump	7.90 m
1973	Universiade	Moscow, Soviet Union	2nd	Long jump	7.85 m
1974	European Indoor Championships	Gothenburg, Sweden	1st	Long jump	8.17 m
1974	European Championships	Rome, Italy	20th (q)	Long jump	7.43 m
1975	Mediterranean Games	Algiers, Algeria	4th	Long jump	7.59 m

== National titles ==
- French Athletics Championships
  - Long jump: 1973, 1974, 1979
- French Indoor Athletics Championships
  - Long jump: 1972, 1974
