= Satoshi Takayanagi =

Japanese long jumper

Personal information
- Nationality: Japanese
- Born: 16 July 1938 (age 87)

Sport
- Sport: Athletics
- Event: Long jump

Satoshi Takayanagi (高柳 慧, Takayanagi Satoshi; born 16 July 1938) is a Japanese athlete. He competed in the men's long jump at the 1964 Summer Olympics.
