= Hans Baumgartner =

German long jumper

Personal information
- Born: 30 May 1949 (age 77) Stühlingen, Baden-Württemberg, West Germany

Sport
- Sport: Track and field
Medal record
Representing West Germany
Olympic Games
Silver medal – second place	1972 Munich	Long jump
European Indoor Championships
Gold medal – first place	1971 Sofia	Long jump
Gold medal – first place	1973 Rotterdam	Long jump
Gold medal – first place	1977 San Sebastián	Long jump
Silver medal – second place	1972 Grenoble	Long jump
Silver medal – second place	1974 Gothenburg	Long jump
Summer Universiade
Bronze medal – third place	1973 Moscow	Long jump

Hans Peter Baumgartner (born 30 May 1949) is a retired West German long jumper.

He won the silver medal at the 1972 Summer Olympics held in Munich with a jump of 8.18 meters. Baumgartner again took part in the 1976 Summer Olympics, but did not win a medal. He also competed in the 1971 and 1974 European Championships, with the same result.

At the European Indoor Championships he won gold medals in 1971, 1973 and 1977 and silver medals in 1972 and 1974. He also won a bronze medal at the 1973 Summer Universiade and a silver medal at the 1977 IAAF World Cup. 8.18 metres remained his career best jump.

Hans Baumgartner competed for TV Heppenheim and trained under Hansjörg Holzamer. He became West German champion in 1980, 1971, 1972 and 1973. During his active career he measured 1.87 meters and weighed 75 kg.
