= Takayoshi Kawagoe =

Japanese long jumper (born 1949)

Takayoshi Kawagoe (川越 孝悦, Kawagoe Takayoshi; born 4 August 1949) is a Japanese former long jumper who competed in the 1972 Summer Olympics, where he was eliminated in the qualifying round of the men's long jump.
