= Jan Kobuszewski (athlete) =

Polish long jumper

Personal information
- National team: Poland
- Born: May 6, 1947 (age 79)
- Occupation: Athlete

Jan Kobuszewski (born 6 May 1947) is a Polish former long jumper. He competed in Athletics at the 1972 Summer Olympics – Men's long jump.
