= Reinhold Boschert =

German long jumper

Personal information
- Nationality: German
- Born: 6 February 1947 (age 79)

Sport
- Sport: Athletics
- Event: Long jump

Reinhold Boschert (born 6 February 1947) is a German athlete. He competed in the men's long jump at the 1968 Summer Olympics.
