= Geoff Hignett =

English long jumper

Personal information
- Nationality: British (English)
- Born: 5 October 1950 (age 75) Ormskirk, England

Sport
- Sport: Athletics
- Event: long jump
- Club: Pembroke AC; Stretford AC
Medal record
Representing Great Britain
Summer Universiade
Bronze medal – third place	1970 Turin	Long jump

Geoffrey John Hignett (born 5 October 1950), is a male former athlete who competed for England.

== Biography ==
Hignett represented England in the long jump, at the 1970 British Commonwealth Games in Edinburgh, Scotland and also competed at the 1971 European Athletics Championships in Helsinki and won a bronze medal at the Universiade.

Hignett became the British long jump champion after winning the British AAA Championships title at the 1973 AAA Championships. He would later podium twice more at the AAAs at the 1974 AAA Championships and the 1975 AAA Championships.
