= Jaroslav Brož (long jumper) =

Czech long jumper

Personal information
- Nationality: Czech
- Born: 8 November 1950 Pardubice, Czechoslovakia
- Died: 14 July 1975 (aged 24) Pardubice, Czechoslovakia

Sport
- Sport: Athletics
- Event: Long jump
Medal record
Men's athletics
Representing Czechoslovakia
European Indoor Championships
Bronze medal – third place	1972 Grenoble	Long jump

Jaroslav Brož (8 November 1950 – 14 July 1975) was a Czech athlete. He competed in the men's long jump at the 1972 Summer Olympics. He died at the age of 24 of testicular cancer.
