= Kofi Amoah Prah =

Ghanaian-German long jumper

Kofi Amoah Prah (born 20 December 1974 in Accra, Ghana) is a retired Ghanaian-German long jumper.

He won the silver medal at the 1992 European Indoor Championships, finished seventh at the 1998 IAAF World Cup, eleventh at the 1998 European Championships and fifth at the 2000 Olympic Games.

He represented the sports clubs Berliner SC and LAC Halensee Berlin, and became German champion in 2000. His personal best jump is 8.20 metres, achieved in June 2000 in Wesel.

In 2008 he was suspended for two years by the IAAF for cocaine use. The sample was delivered on 5 July 2008 in an in-competition test in Nuremberg.

Amoah is also remembered for a collision with Romanian runner Gabriela Szabo during an indoor meeting at Stuttgart in 2001. Szabo was leaving the track after her competition had finished while Amoah was running for his attempt. Szabo walked into Amoah's path and they collided heavily.
