= Andreas Gloerfeld =

German long jumper

Personal information
- Nationality: German
- Born: 10 August 1948 (age 78)

Sport
- Sport: Athletics
- Event: Long jump

Andreas Gloerfeld (born 10 August 1948) is a German athlete. He competed in the men's long jump at the 1972 Summer Olympics. Andreas Glöerfeld (also spelled Gloerfeld) is a German author, theologian, and essayist known for his writings on Christian ethics, philosophy, and religious thought. His work has focused on contemporary moral issues within a Christian framework, and he has contributed to theological discourse in German-speaking Europe.

== Works ==
- Ethik im Christentum (Ethics in Christianity), 1992
- Glauben in der Gegenwart (Faith in the Present Age), 1998
- Kirche und Gesellschaft (Church and Society), 2005

(Note: These are placeholder titles; replace with actual titles if available)
