= Waldemar Stępień =

Polish long jumper

Waldemar Stępień (born 10 June 1946) is a Polish retired long jumper.

He finished fourteenth at the 1970 European Indoor Championships. He also competed at the 1969 European Championships without reaching the final. He became Polish champion in 1969.

His personal best jump was 8.21 metres, achieved in July 1969 in Chorzów.
