= Grzegorz Cybulski =

Polish long jumper (born 1951)

Personal information
- Born: 23 November 1951 (age 74) Nowa Sol, Poland

Sport
- Sport: Track and field
Medal record
Representing Poland
European Indoor Championships
| Bronze medal – third place | 1973 Rotterdam | Long jump |
Summer Universiade
| Gold medal – first place | 1975 Rome | Long jump |
| Silver medal – second place | 1977 Sofia | Long jump |

Grzegorz Cybulski (born 23 November 1951) is a retired Polish long jumper.

He was born in Nowa Sól, and represented the sports clubs Lumel Zielona Góra and Śląsk Wrocław. He finished eleventh at the 1972 European Indoor Championships, twelfth at the 1972 Olympic Games, won the bronze medal at the 1973 European Indoor Championships, finished fifth at the 1974 European Indoor Championships, won the gold medal at the 1975 Summer Universiade and the silver medal at the 1977 Summer Universiade, finished fourth at the 1978 European Championships. and sixth at the 1979 European Indoor Championships, He competed at the 1976 Olympic Games without reaching the final.

He became Polish champion in 1975, 1976, 1978 and 1979, and Polish indoor champion in 1973, 1974, 1976 and 1978.

His personal best jump was 8.27 metres, achieved in June 1975 in Warsaw.
