= Rick Cuttell =

Canadian high jumper (born 1950)

Personal information
- Born: 14 January 1950 (age 76) London, Ontario, Canada

Sport
- Sport: Athletics
- Event: High jump

Achievements and titles
- Personal bests: Indoor High Jump: 2.21 (Sudbury, 1975); Outdoor High Jump: 2.16 (Vancouver, 1972)
Medal record
Representing Canada
Pan American Games
Bronze medal – third place	1975 Mexico City	High jump

Rick Cuttell (born 14 January 1950) is a Canadian former athlete. He competed in the men's high jump at the 1972 Summer Olympics.
