= Christian Tourret =

French long jumper

Personal information
- Nationality: French
- Born: 20 September 1946 (age 79)

Sport
- Sport: Athletics
- Event: Long jump

Christian Tourret (born 20 September 1946) is a French athlete. He competed in the men's long jump at the 1972 Summer Olympics, At the 1970 European Athletics Indoor Championships he came ninth in the men's long jump final.
