= Terje Haugland =

Norwegian long jumper (1944–2026)

Terje Haugland (11 April 1944 – 5 May 2026) was a Norwegian long jumper.

== Biography ==
Terje Haugland was born in Haugesund on 11 April 1944. He was a nephew of Jens Edv. Haugland, son of Eugen Haugland and father of Hanne Haugland.

He finished eleventh at the 1969 European Championships, thirteenth at the 1970 European Indoor Championships and thirteenth at the 1971 European Championships. He never competed at the Summer Olympics. He became Norwegian champion in long jump in 1969 and 1971. He represented Haugesund IL and IK Tjalve.

His personal best jump was 7.87 metres, achieved in July 1970 at Bislett stadion. This result places him fourth among Norwegian long jumpers, only behind Kristen Fløgstad, Finn Bendixen and Thomas Mellin-Olsen.

Haugland died in Aksdal on 5 May 2026, at the age of 82.
