= Lars-Olof Höök =

Swedish long jumper

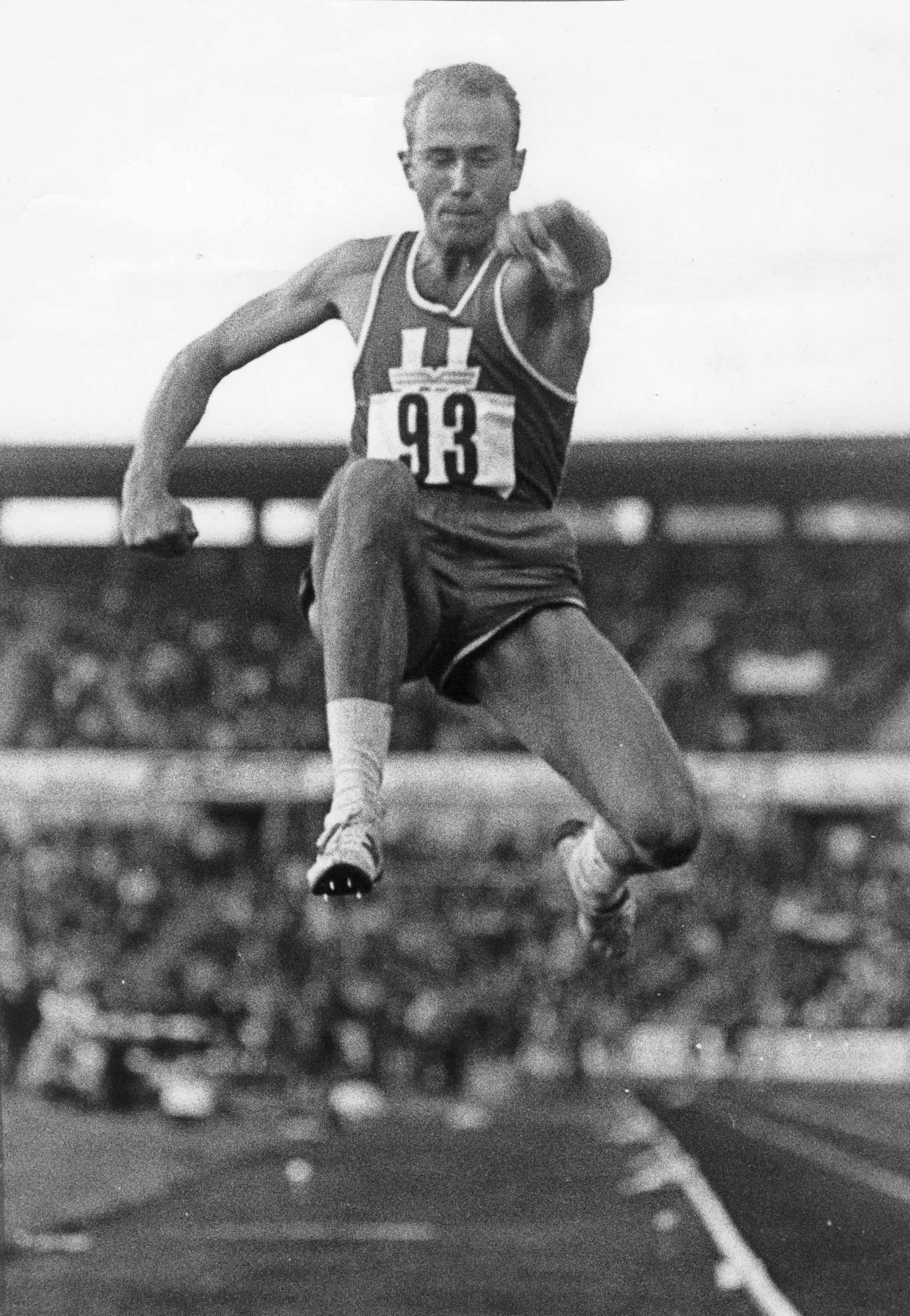

Personal information
- Born: 1 March 1945 (age 81) Djursholm, Sweden
- Height: 185 cm (6 ft 1 in)
- Weight: 79 kg (174 lb)

Sport
- Sport: Athletics
- Event: Long jump
- Club: SoIK Hellas

Achievements and titles
- Personal best: 7.90 (1968)

Lars-Olof Höök (born 1 March 1945) is a former Swedish long jumper who held the Swedish record from 1968 to 1978 and won seven consecutive national titles in 1963–1969. He placed 14th at the 1968 Summer Olympics.
