= Aleksey Pereverzev =

Azerbaijani former long jumper (born 1949)

Personal information
- Born: 20 July 1949 (age 76) Baku, Soviet Union

Sport
- Sport: Track and field
Medal record
Representing Soviet Union
Summer Universiade
Bronze medal – third place	1975 Rome	Long jump

Aleksey Pereverzev (born 20 July 1949) is an Azerbaijani former long jumper, born in Baku, who competed in the 1976 Summer Olympics.
