= Finn Bendixen =

Norwegian long jumper (born 1949)

Finn Bendixen (born 27 June 1949) is a Norwegian long jumper. He represented Lillesand IL and IF Kamp-Vestheim.

Representing the UCLA Bruins track and field team, Bendixen won the 1973 NCAA Division I Outdoor Track and Field Championships in the long jump.

He finished fourteenth in the long jump final at the 1971 European Championships with a jump of 7.32 metres. He also competed at the 1969 European Championships and the 1972 Summer Olympics without reaching the finals. He became Norwegian champion in long jump in 1970, 1972, 1979 and 1980.

His personal best jump was 7.97 metres, achieved in June 1972 in Stockholm. This result places him second among Norwegian long jumpers, only behind Kristen Fløgstad.

In the Norwegian Athletics Association he was a member of the medical committee from 1977 through 1978.
