= Andrzej Stalmach =

Polish long jumper (1942–2020)

Personal information
- Nationality: Polish
- Born: 1 May 1942 Jaworzno, present-day Poland
- Died: 14 September 2020 (aged 78) Jaworzno, Poland

Sport
- Sport: Athletics
- Event: Long jump

Andrzej Stalmach (1 May 1942 – 14 September 2020) was a Polish athlete. He competed in the men's long jump at the 1964 Summer Olympics and the 1968 Summer Olympics.
