= Rafael Blanquer =

Spanish long jumper (born 1945)

Personal information
- Nationality: Spanish
- Born: 14 October 1945 (age 80)

Sport
- Sport: Athletics
- Event: Long jump
Medal record
Men's athletics
Representing Spain
European Indoor Championships
Bronze medal – third place	1970 Vienna	Long jump

Rafael Blanquer Alcantud (born 14 October 1945) is a Spanish athlete. He competed in the men's long jump at the 1976 Summer Olympics.
