= Tõnu Lepik =

Estonian long jumper

Medal record

Men's athletics

Representing Soviet Union

European Championships
Bronze medal – third place	1969 Athens	Long jump

European Indoor Championships
Gold medal – first place	1970 Vienna	Long jump

Tõnu Lepik (born 1 May 1946 in Tallinn) is an Estonian former long jumper who competed in the 1968 Summer Olympics and in the 1976 Summer Olympics.

He won the 1970 European Athletics Indoor Championships with 8.05, Estonian national record.
