= Jack Pani =

French long jumper

Personal information
- Nationality: French
- Born: 21 May 1946 (age 79) Troyes, France
- Height: 175 cm (5 ft 9 in)
- Weight: 70 kg (154 lb)

Sport
- Sport: Athletics
- Event: long jump
- Club: AS Est Paris

Jacques Pani (born 21 May 1946) is a French retired long jumper who competed at two Olympic Games.

== Biography ==
His personal best jump was 8.16 metres, achieved in June 1969 in Pulversheim.

Pani finished third behind Lynn Davies in the long jump event at the British 1967 AAA Championships.

At the 1968 Olympic Games in Mexico City, he represented France in the long jump competition and four years later at the 1972 Olympics Games in Munich, he represented France again.

He married Nicole Pani who was a well known French sprinter.

== Achievements ==
Year	Competition	Venue	Position	Notes
Representing France
1968	Olympic Games	Mexico City, Mexico	7th	
1971	Mediterranean Games	İzmir, Turkey	1st	7.90 CR
1972	European Indoor Championships	Grenoble, France	6th	
