= Leonid Barkovskyy =

Soviet-Ukrainian long jumper

Leonid Barkovskyy (Ukrainian: Леонід Барковський; born 13 December 1940) is a Soviet former long jumper who competed in the 1964 Summer Olympics, in the 1968 Summer Olympics, and in the 1972 Summer Olympics.
