= Alan Lerwill =

British long jumper (1946–2021)

Personal information
- Nationality: British (English)
- Born: 15 November 1946 Portsmouth, England
- Died: 6 February 2021 (aged 74)
- Height: 188 cm (6 ft 2 in)
- Weight: 81 kg (179 lb)

Sport
- Sport: Athletics
- Event: long jump / triple jump
- Club: Queens Park Harriers; Enfield Harriers
Medal record
Athletics
Representing England
Commonwealth Games
| Gold medal – first place | 1974 Christchurch | Long jump |
| Bronze medal – third place | 1970 Edinburgh | Long jump |
Summer Universiade
| Gold medal – first place | 1970 Turin | Long jump |

Alan Leslie Lerwill (15 November 1946 – 6 February 2021) was a British international long jumper who competed in the 1968 Summer Olympics and in the 1972 Summer Olympics.

== Biography ==
At the 1968 Olympic Games in Mexico City, Lerwill represented Great Britain in the long jump event.

Lerwill finished second behind Lynn Davies in the long jump event at the 1969 AAA Championships before he became the British long jump champion after winning the British AAA Championships title at the 1970 AAA Championships. Shortly afterwards he represented England at the 1970 British Commonwealth Games in Edinburgh, Scotland and won a bronze medal in the long jump. He also competed in the triple jump at the games.

Lerwill won the AAA title at the 1972 AAA Championships and later that year at the 1972 Olympics Games in Munich, he represented Great Britain in the long jump again, finishing seventh. He set a British high jump record of 2.10m in 1973.

Lerwill won another AAA title in 1974 before representing England at the 1974 British Commonwealth Games in Christchurch, New Zealand, where he won the gold medal.

He won his fourth and final AAA title at the 1975 AAA Championships.

Alan Lerwill taught PE at Felsted School in Essex between 1976 and 1996.
