= Klaus Beer =

East German athlete (1942–2023)

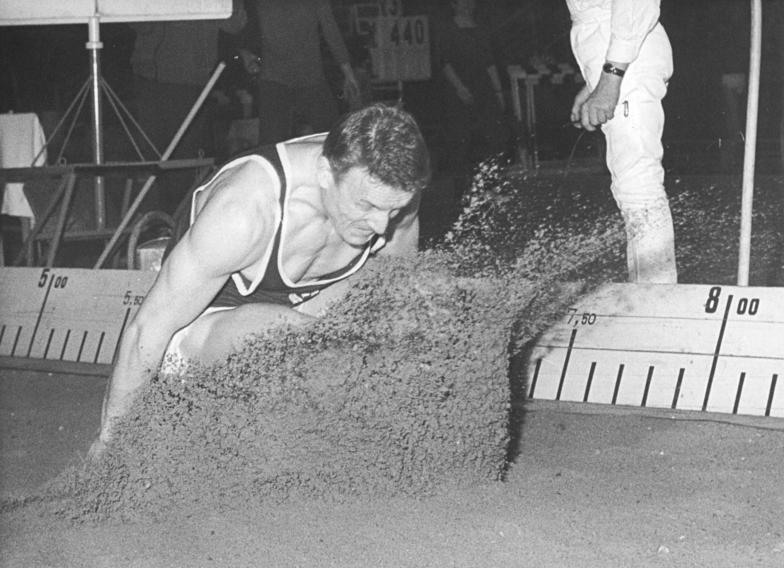
- Beer in 1970

Personal information
- Born: 14 November 1942 Liegnitz, Germany
- Died: 8 June 2023 (aged 80)
Medal record
Men's athletics
Representing East Germany
Olympic Games
Silver medal – second place	1968 Mexico City	Long jump
European Indoor Championships
Silver medal – second place	1970 Vienna	Long jump
European Cup
Silver medal – second place	1970 Stockholm	Long jump

Klaus Beer (14 November 1942 – 8 June 2023) was a track and field athlete active in the 1960s for East Germany. Beer is best known for having won the silver medal in the long jump at the 1968 Summer Olympics, well behind Bob Beamon's record setting performance – Beamon jumped 8.90 m, while Beer jumped 8.19 m.

== Biography ==
Beer was born in Liegnitz, Gau Lower Silesia, German Reich (today Legnica, Poland).

Beer won the silver medal in the long jump at the 1968 Summer Olympics, well behind Bob Beamon's record setting performance – Beamon jumped 8.90 m, while Beer jumped 8.19 m.

Beer was a seven time (1961, 1962, 1964, 1967–1970) East German champion competing outdoors and a national champion four times (1965, 1968–1970) indoors. He came in second at the European Indoor Athletics Championships in 1970. He also came in second at the 1970 European Cup Finals, Europe's team championship, which East Germany won that year.

Beer coached Kofi Amoah Prah and Steffen Landgraf hope.

Beer died on 8 June 2023, at the age of 80.
