= Lynn Davies =

Welsh former track and field athlete

Lynn Davies CBE
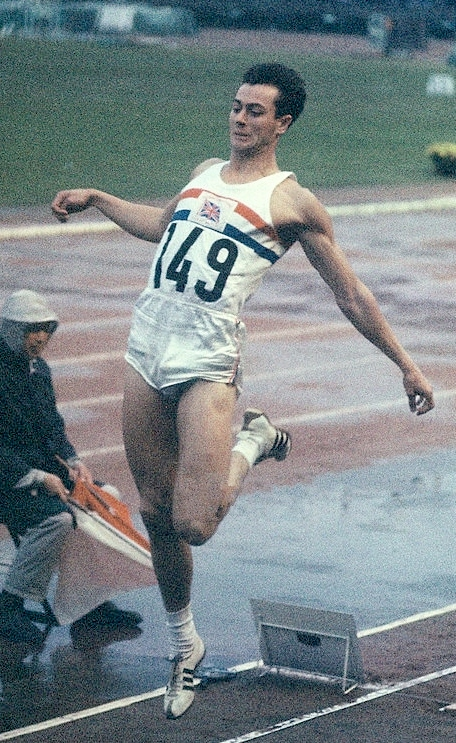
- Davies at the 1964 Olympics

Personal information
- Nickname: Lynn the Leap
- Born: 20 May 1942 (age 84) Nant-y-moel, Wales
- Height: 1.85 m (6 ft 1 in)
- Weight: 77 kg (170 lb)

Sport
- Sport: Athletics
- Events: Long jump, sprint
- Club: Roath Harriers; Cardiff AAC

Achievements and titles
- Personal bests: LJ – 8.23 m (1968); 100 m – 10.51 (1967)
Medal record
Men's athletics
Representing Great Britain
Olympic Games
Gold medal – first place	1964 Tokyo	Long jump
European Championships
Gold medal – first place	1966 Budapest	Long jump
Silver medal – second place	1969 Athens	Long jump
Summer Universiade
Silver medal – second place	1965 Budapest	Long jump
Representing Wales
Commonwealth Games
Gold medal – first place	1966 Kingston	Long jump
Gold medal – first place	1970 Edinburgh	Long jump

Lynn Davies CBE (born 20 May 1942) is a Welsh former track and field athlete who specialised in the long jump. He was the 1964 Olympic champion in the event.

== Early life ==
Davies was born in Nantymoel near Bridgend and was a member of the Cardiff Amateur Athletic Club.

He was the son of Tegfryn Davies, a miner, of 14 Commercial Street. He attended Ogmore County Grammar School. He was in the 1st Ogmore Vale Scouts. He played the piano. He gained A-levels in Maths, English and History in 1960. He trained to become a teacher at Cardiff Training College.

From September 1964 he taught at Bridgend Grammar School, until October 1965.

He was a PE college lecturer at Cardiff College of Education from April 1966.

== Career ==
Davies, a member of Roath Harriers, won an Olympic gold medal in the long jump in 1964 with a mark of 8.07 metres (26 ft 6 in), earning himself the nickname "Lynn the Leap" and winning the first ever long jump gold medal for Great Britain.

He finished ninth in 1968, having been his nation's flag bearer at the opening ceremony. In 1964 he also competed in the 100 metres and 4×100 metres contests. On 2 November 1964 he returned to a welcome from the Garw Valley and Ogmore Valley, in a motorcade from Cardiff. He was the first Welsh person to win individual Olympic gold in a field event.

He was 18th in the 1972 Olympic long jump, his selection being something of a surprise at the time.

Outside the Olympics, Davies was the 1966 European champion in the long jump and was the silver medallist three years later. He was also twice the Commonwealth Games champion, winning titles in 1966 and 1970 (becoming the first man to win that title twice).

Davies was a five-time British long jump champion after winning the British AAA Championships title in 1964, 1966, 1967, 1968 and 1969.

== Personal life ==
Davies was twice a winner of the BBC Wales Sports Personality of the Year award, taking the honour in 1964 and 1966. After retiring from competitions in 1973 he became technical director of Canadian athletics until 1976 and later prepared the British team for the Moscow Olympics.

Davies was appointed a Commander of the Order of the British Empire (CBE) in the 2006 Birthday Honours "for services to Sport, in particular Athletics." He had previously been appointed a Member of the same order (MBE) in the 1967 New Year Honours for services to athletics. He was elected unopposed as President of the UK Athletics Members Council for a further four years following the close of nominations.

His girlfriend was 21 year old Meriel Griffiths, an art teacher in Cardiff, and had plans for marriage took place when he returned from Japan. They had met at Cardiff Training College (now Cardiff Metropolitan University).

He married on Tuesday 19 July 1966 in Sketty. His wife presented Sion a Sian, a Welsh-language quiz show, with Dewi Richards and Jenny Jones, on Television Wales and the West.
