= 1981 European Athletics Indoor Championships – Men's long jump =

The men's long jump event at the 1981 European Athletics Indoor Championships was held on 22 February.

== Results ==
Rank	Name	Nationality	#1	#2	#3	#4	#5	#6	Result	Notes
1st place, gold medalist(s)	Rolf Bernhard	Switzerland	7.69	7.80	7.78	7.95	8.01	7.97	8.01	NR
2nd place, silver medalist(s)	Antonio Corgos	Spain	7.78	x	x	x	x	7.97	7.97	
3rd place, bronze medalist(s)	Shamil Abbyasov	Soviet Union	7.72	7.66	7.78	7.82	7.95	7.87	7.95	
4	László Szalma	Hungary	x	7.66	x	x	7.90	x	7.90	
5	Joachim Busse	West Germany	7.72	x	7.69	6.63	x	x	7.72	
6	Kristian Apostolov	Bulgaria	7.53	x	7.69	x	x	x	7.69	
7	Ivan Tuparov	Bulgaria	x	7.61	x	7.57	x	x	7.61	
8	Atanas Chochev	Bulgaria	x	x	7.61	5.96	x	x	7.61	
9	Claude Morinière	France	x	7.18	7.57				7.57	
10	Roberto Veglia	Italy	7.55	7.51	7.55				7.55	
11	Winfried Klepsch	West Germany	7.55	x	x				7.55	
12	Jan Leitner	Czechoslovakia	7.26	x	7.39				7.39	
13	Aleksandr Beskrovniy	Soviet Union	7.31	7.25	7.30				7.31	
14	Dimitrios Delifotis	Greece	x	7.26	x				7.26	
