= 1980 European Athletics Indoor Championships – Men's long jump =

The men's long jump event at the 1980 European Athletics Indoor Championships was held on 2 March in Sindelfingen. The original winner, Ronald Desruelles of Belgium, was later disqualified after testing positive for a banned substance.

== Results ==
Rank	Name	Nationality	#1	#2	#3	#4	#5	#6	Result	Notes
~~1~~	Ronald Desruelles	Belgium	~~7.79~~	~~7.83~~	~~x~~	~~x~~	~~x~~	~~8.08~~	~~8.08~~	DQ
1st place, gold medalist(s)	Winfried Klepsch	West Germany	7.77	7.53	7.58	7.17	7.98	x	7.98	
2nd place, silver medalist(s)	Nenad Stekić	Yugoslavia	7.83	7.90	7.88	7.91	7.78	7.63	7.91	
3rd place, bronze medalist(s)	Stanisław Jaskułka	Poland							7.85	
4	Joachim Busse	West Germany							7.85	
5	Viktor Belsky	Soviet Union							7.79	
6	Jörg Klocke	West Germany							7.76	
7	Andrzej Klimaszewski	Poland							7.73	
8	Rolf Bernhard	Switzerland							7.72	
9	Ivan Tuparov	Bulgaria							7.70	
10	László Szalma	Hungary							7.55	
11	Jaroslav Prišcák	Czechoslovakia							7.50	
12	Dimitrios Delifotis	Greece							7.50	
13	Olli Pousi	Finland							7.19	
14	Marco Piochi	Italy							5.92	
