= 1983 European Athletics Indoor Championships – Men's long jump =

The men's long jump event at the 1983 European Athletics Indoor Championships was held on 6 March.

== Results ==
Rank	Name	Nationality	#1	#2	#3	#4	#5	#6	Result	Notes
1st place, gold medalist(s)	László Szálma	Hungary	7.70	7.79	7.90	7.87	7.95	x	7.95	
2nd place, silver medalist(s)	Gyula Pálóczi	Hungary	7.39	7.65	5.78	x	x	7.90	7.90	
3rd place, bronze medalist(s)	Jens Knipphals	West Germany	7.56	7.69	7.76	7.69	7.78	7.82	7.82	
4	Antonio Corgos	Spain	7.78	7.48	x	x	x	x	7.78	
5	Andrzej Klimaszewski	Poland	7.44	7.53	7.76	7.39	x	x	7.76	
6	Jarmo Kärnä	Finland	x	7.17	7.73	7.55	x	7.65	7.73	
7	Dimitrios Delifotis	Greece	7.73	7.50	x	x	x	x	7.73	
8	Yordan Yanev	Bulgaria	7.68	7.71	x	x	x	7.55	7.71	
9	René Gloor	Switzerland	7.23	7.52	5.42				7.52	
10	Zdeněk Hanáček	Czechoslovakia	x	6.89	7.30				7.30	
11	Ronald Desruelles	Belgium	7.21	x	7.15				7.21	
12	Norbert Brige	France	x	7.04	7.18				7.18	
