= Athletics at the 1980 Summer Olympics – Men's long jump =

Men's long jump at the Games of the XXII Olympiad
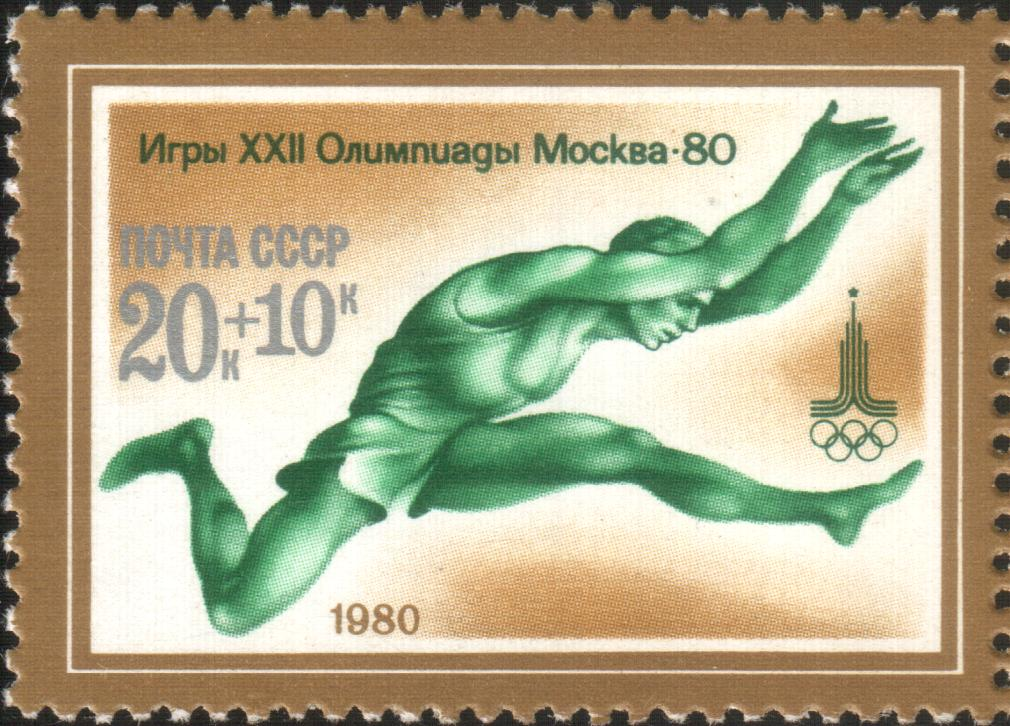
- Soviet postage stamp depicting long jumping at the 1980 Games
- Venue: Central Lenin Stadium
- Dates: 27 July 1980 (qualifying); 28 July 1980 (final)
- Competitors: 32 from 23 nations
- Winning distance: 8.54

Medalists
| 1st place, gold medalist(s) | | Lutz Dombrowski; East Germany |
| 2nd place, silver medalist(s) | | Frank Paschek; East Germany |
| 3rd place, bronze medalist(s) | | Valeriy Podluzhniy; Soviet Union |

The men's long jump at the 1980 Summer Olympics in Moscow, Russian SFSR, Soviet Union had a start list of 32 competitors from 23 countries, with two qualifying groups (32 jumpers) before the final (12) took place on Monday July 28, 1980. The maximum number of athletes per nation had been set at 3 since the 1930 Olympic Congress. The top twelve and ties and all those reaching 7.90 metres advanced to the final. The event was won by 33 cm by Lutz Dombrowski of East Germany, the first gold medal in the men's long jump by any German jumper. Frank Paschek made East Germany the only nation other than the United States to have two men on the podium in the same Games in the event. Valeriy Podluzhniy won the Soviet Union's first men's long jump medal since 1964. The American-led boycott ended the United States' three-Games gold medal streak and 18-Games streak of winning at least a silver medal in the event.

== Background ==
This was the 19th appearance of the event, which is one of 12 athletics events to have been held at every Summer Olympics. The returning finalists from the 1972 Games were fifth-place finisher João Carlos de Oliveira of Brazil, sixth-place finisher Nenad Stekić of Yugoslavia, seventh-place finisher Valeriy Podluzhniy of the Soviet Union, and ninth-place finisher Rolf Bernhard of Switzerland. Larry Myricks, who had broken his foot in warmups in 1976, would have been the favorite but was kept out of the Games by the American-led boycott; aside from Bob Beamon's incomparable 8.90 metre jump, Myricks had the best-ever jump (at 8.52 metres in 1979). Also kept out was the young Carl Lewis, who had not yet reached his potential in the event but would later dominate it for two decades. Stekić would have been a solid contender (particularly with Myricks out), but was injured. This left Lutz Dombrowski of East Germany the heavy favorite in a depleted field.

Benin, Ethiopia, Kuwait, and Mozambique each made their first appearance in the event. France appeared for the 16th time, most of any nation competing in 1980 but still two appearances behind the United States (missing the event for the first time).

== Competition format ==
The 1980 competition used the two-round format with divided final introduced in 1952. The qualifying round gave each competitor three jumps to achieve a distance of 7.90 metres; if fewer than 12 men did so, the top 12 (including all those tied) would advance. The final provided each jumper with three jumps; the top eight jumpers received an additional three jumps for a total of six, with the best to count (qualifying round jumps were not considered for the final).

== Records ==
The standing world and Olympic records prior to the event were as follows.

| World record | Bob Beamon (USA) | 8.90 | Mexico City, Mexico | 18 October 1968 |
| Olympic record | Bob Beamon (USA) | 8.90 | Mexico City, Mexico | 18 October 1968 |

No new world or Olympic records were set during the competition.

== Schedule ==
All times are Moscow Time (UTC+3)

| Date | Time | Round |
|---|---|---|
| Sunday, 27 July 1980 | 10:30 | Qualifying |
| Monday, 28 July 1980 | 17:50 | Final |

== Results ==
=== Qualifying ===
The qualifying round was held on Sunday July 27, 1980.

| Rank | Athlete | Nation | 1 | 2 | 3 | Distance | Notes |
|---|---|---|---|---|---|---|---|
| 1 | Frank Paschek | East Germany | 8.17 | — | — | 8.17 | Q |
| 1 | Lutz Dombrowski | East Germany | 8.17 | — | — | 8.17 | Q |
| 3 | Stanisław Jaskułka | Poland | 7.46 | 8.07 | — | 8.07 | Q |
| 4 | Valeriy Podluzhniy | Soviet Union | 8.02 | — | — | 8.02 | Q |
| 5 | Viktor Belsky | Soviet Union | X | 7.64 | 8.01 | 8.01 | Q |
| 6 | Rolf Bernhard | Switzerland | 7.98 | — | — | 7.98 | Q |
| 7 | Antonio Corgos | Spain | 7.46 | 7.76 | 7.96 | 7.96 | Q |
| 8 | László Szalma | Hungary | 7.86 | 7.72 | 7.91 | 7.91 | Q |
| 9 | Philippe Deroche | France | 7.90 | — | — | 7.90 | Q |
| 10 | Yordan Yanev | Bulgaria | 7.63 | 7.68 | 7.84 | 7.84 | q |
| 11 | Kayode Elegbede | Nigeria | 7.76 | 7.82 | 7.50 | 7.82 | q |
| 12 | João Carlos de Oliveira | Brazil | X | 7.78 | — | 7.78 | q |
| 13 | Joshua Kio | Nigeria | 7.77 | 7.67 | 7.45 | 7.77 | |
| 14 | Andrzej Klimaszewski | Poland | 7.76 | X | 6.56 | 7.76 | |
| 15 | Dimitrios Delifotis | Greece | 7.74 | 7.63 | 7.14 | 7.74 | |
| 16 | William Rea | Austria | 7.60 | 7.71 | 7.74 | 7.74 | |
| 17 | Alberto Solanas | Spain | 7.36 | 7.73 | 7.71 | 7.73 | |
| 18 | Jan Leitner | Czechoslovakia | 7.68 | 7.63 | 7.57 | 7.68 | |
| 19 | Doudou N'Diaye | Senegal | 7.49 | X | 7.66 | 7.66 | |
| 20 | Peter Rieger | East Germany | X | 7.59 | — | 7.59 | |
| 21 | David Giralt | Cuba | X | 7.54 | 7.57 | 7.57 | |
| 22 | Ivan Tuparov | Bulgaria | 7.46 | X | X | 7.46 | |
| 23 | Gary Honey | Australia | X | 7.44 | X | 7.44 | |
| 24 | Yusuf Alli | Nigeria | 7.45 | 7.40 | X | 7.43 | |
| 25 | Béla Bakosi | Hungary | 7.29 | X | X | 7.29 | |
| 26 | Théophile Hounou | Benin | 7.07 | 7.01 | 7.03 | 7.07 | |
| 27 | Stelio Craveirinha | Mozambique | 6.78 | 6.94 | X | 6.94 | |
| 28 | Ronald Raborg | Peru | X | 6.85 | X | 6.85 | |
| 29 | Abebe Gessese | Ethiopia | 6.66 | 6.64 | 6.46 | 6.66 | |
| 30 | Nenad Stekić | Yugoslavia | 5.75 | — | — | 5.75 | |
| — | Essa Hashem | Kuwait | X | X | X | No mark | |
| — | Fidelis Ndyabagye | Uganda | X | X | X | No mark | |
| — | Oli Pousi | Finland | DNS | | | | |
| — | Bogger Mushanga | Zambia | DNS | | | | |

=== Final ===
| Rank | Athlete | Nation | 1 | 2 | 3 | 4 | 5 | 6 | Distance |
|---|---|---|---|---|---|---|---|---|---|
| 1st place, gold medalist(s) | Lutz Dombrowski | East Germany | 8.15 | 8.32 | — | 8.21 | 8.54 | 8.34 | 8.54 |
| 2nd place, silver medalist(s) | Frank Paschek | East Germany | 7.81 | 8.21 | X | X | 7.85 | 7.94 | 8.21 |
| 3rd place, bronze medalist(s) | Valeriy Podluzhniy | Soviet Union | 8.07 | 8.08 | 7.97 | 8.18 | X | 7.82 | 8.18 |
| 4 | László Szalma | Hungary | 8.13 | 7.99 | X | 7.95 | X | X | 8.13 |
| 5 | Stanisław Jaskułka | Poland | 7.73 | 7.76 | 7.97 | 7.87 | 7.97 | 8.13 | 8.13 |
| 6 | Viktor Belskiy | Soviet Union | 7.79 | 7.15 | 8.10 | 7.76 | 7.74 | X | 8.10 |
| 7 | Antonio Corgos | Spain | 8.02 | 8.09 | X | — | X | 7.97 | 8.09 |
| 8 | Yordan Yanev | Bulgaria | 7.91 | X | 7.88 | X | 8.02 | X | 8.02 |
| 9 | Rolf Bernhard | Switzerland | 7.88 | X | 7.71 | Did not advance | | | 7.88 |
| 10 | Philippe Deroche | France | 7.63 | 7.65 | 7.77 | Did not advance | | | 7.77 |
| 11 | Kayode Elegbede | Nigeria | X | X | 7.49 | Did not advance | | | 7.49 |
| — | João Carlos de Oliveira | Brazil | DNS | | | | | | |

== See also ==
- 1978 Men's European Championships Long Jump (Prague)
- 1982 Men's European Championships Long Jump (Athens)
- 1983 Men's World Championships Long Jump (Helsinki)
