= 1982 European Athletics Championships – Men's long jump =

Men's long jump at the European Athletics Championships

These are the official results of the Men's long jump event at the 1982 European Championships in Athens, Greece, held at Olympic Stadium "Spiros Louis" on 8 and 9 September 1982.

== Medalists ==
Gold	Lutz Dombrowski; East Germany
Silver	Antonio Corgos; Spain
Bronze	Jan Leitner; Czechoslovakia

== Results ==
=== Final ===
9 September

Rank	Name	Nationality	Result	Notes
1st place, gold medalist(s)	Lutz Dombrowski	East Germany	8.41 w (w: 2.9 m/s)	
2nd place, silver medalist(s)	Antonio Corgos	Spain	8.19 (w: 0.4 m/s)	
3rd place, bronze medalist(s)	Jan Leitner	Czechoslovakia	8.08 (w: 1.7 m/s)	
4	Zdeněk Mazur	Czechoslovakia	8.08 (w: -0.1 m/s)	
5	Nenad Stekić	Yugoslavia	7.93 (w: -0.5 m/s)	
6	Giovanni Evangelisti	Italy	7.89 (w: 0.7 m/s)	
7	Atanas Chochev	Bulgaria	7.89 w (w: 2.4 m/s)	
8	Atanas Atanasov	Bulgaria	7.82 (w: -0.2 m/s)	
9	Rolf Bernhard	Switzerland	7.75 (w: -0.4 m/s)	
10	Dimitrios Delifotis	Greece	7.75 (w: 0.6 m/s)	
11	László Szalma	Hungary	7.74 (w: -1.1 m/s)	
12	Ivan Tuparov	Bulgaria	7.73 (w: 1.1 m/s)	
13	Sergey Rodin	Soviet Union	7.70 (w: 0.3 m/s)	
14	Jörg Klocke	West Germany	7.56 (w: -0.5 m/s)	

=== Qualification ===
8 September

Rank	Name	Nationality	Result	Notes
1	Lutz Dombrowski	East Germany	8.25 (w: -1.0 m/s)	CR Q
2	Antonio Corgos	Spain	8.02 (w: -0.5 m/s)	Q
3	Sergey Rodin	Soviet Union	7.99 (w: -0.3 m/s)	Q
4	Rolf Bernhard	Switzerland	7.93 (w: 0 m/s)	Q
5	Jörg Klocke	West Germany	7.91 (w: -0.7 m/s)	Q
6	Zdeněk Mazur	Czechoslovakia	7.91 (w: 1.1 m/s)	Q
7	Nenad Stekić	Yugoslavia	7.91 (w: -1 m/s)	Q
8	Dimitrios Delifotis	Greece	7.89 (w: 1.3 m/s)	Q
9	Atanas Atanasov	Bulgaria	7.85 (w: 1.2 m/s)	Q
10	László Szalma	Hungary	7.84 (w: -1.2 m/s)	Q
11	Atanas Chochev	Bulgaria	7.82 (w: 0.3 m/s)	Q
12	Ivan Tuparov	Bulgaria	7.80 (w: -0.2 m/s)	Q
13	Jan Leitner	Czechoslovakia	7.80 (w: -1.1 m/s)	Q
14	Giovanni Evangelisti	Italy	7.80 (w: 0.3 m/s)	Q
15	Stanisław Jaskułka	Poland	7.74 (w: 0.7 m/s)	
16	Jarmo Kärnä	Finland	7.70 (w: 0.7 m/s)	
17	Ronald Desruelles	Belgium	7.68 (w: -1.7 m/s)	
18	Yuriy Samarin	Soviet Union	7.62 (w: 0.3 m/s)	
19	Shamil Abbyasov	Soviet Union	7.58 (w: -0.1 m/s)	
20	René Gloor	Switzerland	7.54 (w: -1.4 m/s)	
21	Gyula Pálóczi	Hungary	7.49 (w: 1.2 m/s)	
22	Anders Hoffström	Sweden	7.30 (w: 1.3 m/s)	

== Participation ==
According to an unofficial count, 22 athletes from 15 countries participated in the event.

- Belgium (1)
- Bulgaria (3)
- Czechoslovakia (2)
- East Germany (1)
- Finland (1)
- Greece (1)
- Hungary (2)
- Italy (1)
- Poland (1)
- Soviet Union (3)
- Spain (1)
- Sweden (1)
- Switzerland (2)
- West Germany (1)
- Yugoslavia (1)

== See also ==
- 1978 Men's European Championships Long Jump (Prague)
- 1980 Men's Olympic Long Jump (Moscow)
- 1983 Men's World Championships Long Jump (Helsinki)
- 1984 Men's Olympic Long Jump (Los Angeles)
- 1986 Men's European Championships Long Jump (Stuttgart)
- 1987 Men's World Championships Long Jump (Rome)
- 1988 Men's Olympic Long Jump (Seoul)
