= Athletics at the Friendship Games – Men's long jump =

The men's long jump event at the Friendship Games was held on 17 August 1984 at the Grand Arena of the Central Lenin Stadium in Moscow, Soviet Union.

== Results ==
| Rank | Name | Nationality | #1 | #2 | #3 | #4 | #5 | #6 | Result | Notes |
|---|---|---|---|---|---|---|---|---|---|---|
| 1st place, gold medalist(s) | Konstantin Semykin | Soviet Union | 7.88 | x | x | 7.95 | 8.38 | x | 8.38 | NR |
| 2nd place, silver medalist(s) | Jaime Jefferson | Cuba | 8.13 | 8.03 | 8.04 | 8.37 | x | 7.89 | 8.37 | NR |
| 3rd place, bronze medalist(s) | Sergey Layevskiy | Soviet Union | 8.09 | 8.18 | x | 8.22 | x | 7.98 | 8.22 | |
| 4 | László Szalma | Hungary | | | | | | | 8.15 | |
| 5 | Gyula Pálóczi | Hungary | | | | | | | 8.02 | |
| 6 | Oganes Stepanyan | Soviet Union | | | | | | | 7.99 | |
| 7 | Atanas Zapryanov | Bulgaria | | | | | | | 7.94 | |
| 8 | Włodzimierz Włodarczyk | Poland | | | | | | | 7.90 | |
| 9 | Jan Leitner | Czechoslovakia | | | | | | | 7.88 | |
| 10 | Zdeněk Hanáček | Czechoslovakia | | | | | | | 7.82 | |
| 11 | Matthias Koch | East Germany | | | | | | | 7.78 | |
| 12 | Ron Beer | East Germany | | | | | | | 7.73 | |
| 13 | Ubaldo Duany | Cuba | | | | | | | 7.47 | |
| 14 | Fernando Valiente | Peru | | | | | | | 7.06 | |
| | Stanisław Jaskułka | Poland | | | | | | | NM | |

== See also ==
- Athletics at the 1984 Summer Olympics – Men's long jump
