= 1974 European Athletics Championships – Men's long jump =

Men's long jump at the European Athletics Championships

The men's long jump at the 1974 European Athletics Championships was held in Rome, Italy, at Stadio Olimpico on 3 and 4 September 1974.

== Medalists ==
Gold	Valeriy Podluzhniy; Soviet Union
Silver	Nenad Stekić; Yugoslavia
Bronze	Yevgeniy Shubin; Soviet Union

== Results ==
=== Final ===
4 September

Rank	Name	Nationality	Result	Notes
1st place, gold medalist(s)	Valeriy Podluzhniy	Soviet Union	8.12 w (w: 2.8 m/s)	
2nd place, silver medalist(s)	Nenad Stekić	Yugoslavia	8.05 (w: 1.5 m/s)	
3rd place, bronze medalist(s)	Yevgeniy Shubin	Soviet Union	7.98 (w: 1.9 m/s)	
4	Hans Baumgartner	West Germany	7.93 (w: 1.0 m/s)	
5	Rolf Bernhard	Switzerland	7.91 (w: 0.9 m/s)	NR
6	Wolfram Lauterbach	East Germany	7.87 (w: 1.4 m/s)	
7	Max Klauß	East Germany	7.73 (w: 1.4 m/s)	
8	Tõnu Lepik	Soviet Union	7.73 (w: 1.2 m/s)	
9	Alan Lerwill	Great Britain	7.68 w (w: 2.3 m/s)	
10	Jacques Rousseau	France	7.58 w (w: 2.9 m/s)	
11	Rafael Blanquer	Spain	7.38 (w: 0.5 m/s)	
12	Frank Wartenberg	East Germany	7.25 (w: 1 m/s)	

=== Qualification ===
3 September

Rank	Group	Name	Nationality	Result	Notes
1	B	Valeriy Podluzhniy	Soviet Union	7.91 (w: 1.5 m/s)	Q
2	A	Jacques Rousseau	France	7.83	Q
3	B	Rolf Bernhard	Switzerland	7.77 (w: 0.5 m/s)	Q
4	B	Hans Baumgartner	West Germany	7.73 (w: 0.0 m/s)	Q
5	B	Tõnu Lepik	Soviet Union	7.72 (w: 0.4 m/s)	Q
6	B	Yevgeniy Shubin	Soviet Union	7.72 (w: 0.8 m/s)	Q
7	B	Wolfram Lauterbach	East Germany	7.68 (w: 0.3 m/s)	q
8	A	Max Klauß	East Germany	7.67	q
9	A	Nenad Stekić	Yugoslavia	7.67 (w: 0.4 m/s)	q
10	B	Alan Lerwill	Great Britain	7.67 (w: 0.8 m/s)	q
11	A	Rafael Blanquer	Spain	7.66 (w: 1.0 m/s)	q
12	A	Frank Wartenberg	East Germany	7.62 (w: 1.0 m/s)	q
13	B	Dumitru Iordache	Romania	7.58 (w: 0.5 m/s)	
14	B	Piacarlo Molinaris	Italy	7.53 (w: 1.9 m/s)	
15	A	Gilbert Zante	France	7.51 (w: 0.0 m/s)	
16	A	Grzegorz Cybulski	Poland	7.50 (w: 0.8 m/s)	
17	B	Joachim Busse	West Germany	7.49 (w: 0.6 m/s)	
18	A	Stanisław Szudrowicz	Poland	7.48 (w: -1.6 m/s)	
19	A	Zbigniew Beta	Poland	7.47 (w: 0.8 m/s)	
20	A	Jean-François Bonhème	France	7.43	
21	A	Ulf Jarfelt	Sweden	7.41 (w: 0.4 m/s)	
22	B	Ulrik Kowring	West Germany	7.37 (w: 1.2 m/s)	
	A	Kristen Fløgstad	Norway	DNS	
	B	Apostolos Kathiniotis	Greece	DNS	

== Participation ==
According to an unofficial count, 22 athletes from 12 countries participated in the event.

- East Germany (3)
- France (3)
- Italy (1)
- Poland (3)
- Romania (1)
- Soviet Union (3)
- Spain (1)
- Sweden (1)
- Switzerland (1)
- Great Britain (1)
- West Germany (3)
- Yugoslavia (1)
