= 1985 European Athletics Indoor Championships – Men's long jump =

The men's long jump event at the 1985 European Athletics Indoor Championships was held on 3 March in Piraeus, Greece. In a rare occurrence, the first two athletes recorded the same distance in their best jump and the second best jump. Because of this, the third best jump decided the gold medal.

== Results ==
Rank	Name	Nationality	#1	#2	#3	#4	#5	#6	Result	Notes
1st place, gold medalist(s)	Gyula Pálóczi	Hungary	7.79	7.71	7.96	7.94	8.01	8.15	8.15	
2nd place, silver medalist(s)	László Szálma	Hungary	7.64	7.79	7.94	x	8.01	8.15	8.15	
3rd place, bronze medalist(s)	Sergey Layevskiy	Soviet Union	7.83	8.03	8.07	8.14	–	x	8.14	
4	Jan Leitner	Czechoslovakia	7.71	7.91	x	7.91	7.96	8.13	8.13	
5	Giovanni Evangelisti	Italy	x	x	7.77	x	7.91	8.01	8.01	
6	Antonio Corgos	Spain	7.58	7.64	7.94	x	x	x	7.94	
7	Atanas Atanasov	Bulgaria	7.55	7.79	7.78	7.86	7.77	7.67	7.86	
8	Claude Morinière	France	7.61	7.86	x	x	x	x	7.86	
9	Emiel Mellaard	Netherlands	7.72	7.76	7.52				7.76	
10	Zdeněk Hanáček	Czechoslovakia	7.40	7.76	x				7.76	
11	Vladimir Amidzhinov	Bulgaria	7.70	7.61	7.64				7.70	
12	Ronald Desruelles	Belgium	7.68	7.60	7.57				7.68	
13	Alberto Solanas	Spain	7.59	x	7.60				7.60	
14	René Gloor	Switzerland	7.59	7.48	7.39				7.59	
15	Zsolt Szabó	Hungary	x	7.56	x				7.56	
16	Markus Kessler	West Germany	x	7.53	x				7.53	
17	Christian Thomas	West Germany	x	7.50	x				7.50	
18	Einar Sagli	Norway	7.47	x	–				7.47	
19	José Leitão	Portugal	6.88	x	x				6.88	
	João Lima	Portugal	x	x	x				NM	
