= 1982 European Athletics Indoor Championships – Men's long jump =

The men's long jump event at the 1982 European Athletics Indoor Championships was held on 7 March.

== Results ==
Rank	Name	Nationality	Results	Notes
1st place, gold medalist(s)	Henry Lauterbach	East Germany	7.86	
2nd place, silver medalist(s)	Rolf Bernhard	Switzerland	7.83	
3rd place, bronze medalist(s)	Giovanni Evangelisti	Italy	7.83	
4	Jan Leitner	Czechoslovakia	7.82	
5	László Szálma	Hungary	7.78	
6	Marco Piochi	Italy	7.76	
7	Ronald Desruelles	Belgium	7.75	
8	Atanas Chochev	Bulgaria	7.64	
9	René Gloor	Switzerland	7.49	
10	Antonio Corgos	Spain	7.48	
11	Aleksandr Beskrovniy	Soviet Union	7.46	
12	Anders Hoffström	Sweden	7.45	
13	Denis Pinabel	France	7.42	
