= 1978 European Athletics Championships – Men's long jump =

Men's long jump at the European Athletics Championships

The men's long jump at the 1978 European Athletics Championships was held in Prague, then Czechoslovakia, at Stadion Evžena Rošického on 1 and 2 September 1978.

== Medalists ==
Gold	Jacques Rousseau; France
Silver	Nenad Stekić; Yugoslavia
Bronze	Vladimir Tsepelyov; Soviet Union

== Results ==
=== Final ===
2 September

Rank	Name	Nationality	Result	Notes
1st place, gold medalist(s)	Jacques Rousseau	France	8.18	CR
2nd place, silver medalist(s)	Nenad Stekić	Yugoslavia	8.12	
3rd place, bronze medalist(s)	Vladimir Tsepelyov	Soviet Union	8.01	
4	Grzegorz Cybulski	Poland	7.96	
5	Jochen Verschl	West Germany	7.89	
6	Valeriy Podluzhniy	Soviet Union	7.89	
7	Roy Mitchell	Great Britain	7.88	
8	Åke Fransson	Sweden	7.65	
9	Jaroslav Křivka	Czechoslovakia	7.60	
10	Stanisław Jaskułka	Poland	7.60	
11	Jan Leitner	Czechoslovakia	7.59	
12	Jaroslav Priščák	Czechoslovakia	7.48	

=== Qualification ===
1 September

Rank	Name	Nationality	Result	Notes
1	Nenad Stekić	Yugoslavia	7.96	Q
2	Vladimir Tsepelyov	Soviet Union	7.95	Q
3	Jaroslav Priščák	Czechoslovakia	7.81	Q
4	Jan Leitner	Czechoslovakia	7.80	Q
5	Valeriy Podluzhniy	Soviet Union	7.79	q
6	Roy Mitchell	Great Britain	7.77	q
7	Stanisław Jaskułka	Poland	7.74	q
8	Jacques Rousseau	France	7.72	q
9	Grzegorz Cybulski	Poland	7.71	q
10	Jaroslav Křivka	Czechoslovakia	7.71	q
11	Jochen Verschl	West Germany	7.66	q
12	Åke Fransson	Sweden	7.66	q
13	Marek Chludziński	Poland	7.61	
14	Philippe Deroche	France	7.58	
15	Ronald Desruelles	Belgium	7.54	
16	László Szalma	Hungary	7.53	
17	Oganes Stepanyan	Soviet Union	7.52	
18	Winfried Klepsch	West Germany	7.52	
19	Dimitrios Delifotis	Greece	7.44	
20	Maurizio Maffi	Italy	7.42	
21	Alberto Solanas	Spain	7.36	

== Participation ==
According to an unofficial count, 21 athletes from 13 countries participated in the event.

- Belgium (1)
- Czechoslovakia (3)
- France (2)
- Greece (1)
- Hungary (1)
- Italy (1)
- Poland (3)
- Soviet Union (3)
- Spain (1)
- Sweden (1)
- Great Britain (1)
- West Germany (2)
- Yugoslavia (1)
