= 1986 European Athletics Indoor Championships – Men's long jump =

The men's long jump event at the 1986 European Athletics Indoor Championships was held on 22 February.

== Results ==
Rank	Name	Nationality	#1	#2	#3	#4	#5	#6	Result	Notes
1st place, gold medalist(s)	Robert Emmiyan	Soviet Union	8.21	8.29	x	x	8.20	8.32	8.32	
2nd place, silver medalist(s)	László Szálma	Hungary	7.92	8.10	x	x	8.24	8.22	8.24	NR
3rd place, bronze medalist(s)	Jan Leitner	Czechoslovakia	7.95	7.94	7.94	x	8.17	7.98	8.17	
4	Antonio Corgos	Spain	8.08	x	x	x	8.04	8.12	8.12	
5	Sergey Layevskiy	Soviet Union	x	7.79	8.05	7.90	x	x	8.05	
6	Zdeněk Hanáček	Czechoslovakia	7.87	7.93	7.89	x	x	7.94	7.94	
7	Atanas Chochev	Bulgaria	x	7.79	7.85	x	5.73	–	7.85	
8	Jesús Oliván	Spain	7.78	7.77	7.82	x	x	x	7.82	
9	Mirosław Hydel	Poland	7.82	7.64	7.72	7.69	7.68	7.71	7.82	
10	Norbert Brige	France	7.81	x	7.70				7.81	
11	Atanas Atanasov	Bulgaria	7.76	7.76	x				7.81	
12	Nenad Stekić	Yugoslavia	7.58	7.61	7.43				7.61	
13	Jerzy Żeligowski	Poland	7.61	x	x				7.61	
14	Claudio Cherubini	Italy	x	x	7.52				7.52	
15	Dietmar Haaf	West Germany	7.48	7.38	7.28				7.48	
16	Carlos Medeiros	Portugal	x	x	7.35				7.35	
	Khristo Markov	Bulgaria	x	r					NM	
