= László Szalma =

Hungarian long jumper

Personal information
- Born: 27 October 1957 (age 68) Nagymaros, Hungary

Sport
- Sport: Track and field
Medal record
Representing Hungary
European Indoor Championships
Gold medal – first place	1978 Milan	Long jump
Gold medal – first place	1983 Budapest	Long jump
Silver medal – second place	1985 Pireaus	Long jump
Silver medal – second place	1986 Madrid	Long jump
Silver medal – second place	1988 Budapest	Long jump
Bronze medal – third place	1977 San Sebastián	Long jump
Summer Universiade
Gold medal – first place	1981 Bucharest	Long jump

László Szalma (born 27 October 1957) is a retired Hungarian long jumper. He won six medals at the European Indoor Championships—two gold, three silver and one bronze—and finished fourth at the 1980 Olympic Games and the 1983 World Championships. His career best jump of 8.30 metres, achieved in July 1985 in Budapest, is the current Hungarian record.

== Career ==
He was born in Nagymaros. He won a Hungarian title for the first time in 1977, taking the national indoor championship, and first made his mark in international athletics at the 1977 European Indoor Championships. With a jump of 7.78 metres he won the bronze medal. At the 1978 European Indoor Championships the next year he won the gold medal with a jump of 7.83 metres. In 1980 he competed at the Olympic Games in Moscow, finishing fourth. Then, despite jumping even better at the 1981 European Indoor Championships, Szalma only finished fourth with 7.90 metres, eleven centimetres behind the winner Rolf Bernhard. In the summer he won the gold medal at the 1981 Summer Universiade. At the 1982 European Indoor Championships, there was an eleven centimetre gap between first and seventh place; Szalma finished in between at a fifth place. At the 1982 European Championships he dropped slightly to an eleventh place.

In 1983 Szalma competed at the inaugural World Championships. He leapt 7.97 metres to progress from the qualifying round, and finished fourth in the final with 8.12 metres. He missed the 1984 Summer Olympics due to the Soviet-led 1984 Summer Olympics boycott, but repeated the fourth place at the 1985 World Indoor Games. During the 1984–85 indoor season he also won the silver medal at the European Indoor Championships. It was a very tight competition, with Szalma tying the winner, his compatriot Gyula Pálóczi, on 8.15 metres but with Pálóczi winning on countback. Also, Szalma was one centimetre ahead of bronze medalist Sergey Layevskiy and two centimetres ahead of fourth placer Ján Leitner. In the summer he jumped a career best of 8.30 metres, in July in Budapest. The result is the Hungarian record, and also the best result in Europe that year. At the end of the season he finished third at the 1985 World Cup, tying with but losing to Robert Emmiyan at 8.09 metres.

At the 1986 European Indoor Championships Szalma won his second silver medal in a row, but this time with a jump of 8.24 metres, which was a career best on the indoor track. In 1987 there were two indoor championships, with Szalma finishing fourth at the European and sixth at the 1987 World Indoor Championships. In 1988 he won his last silver medal at the European Indoor Championships, finishing three centimetres behind Frans Maas and three ahead of Giovanni Evangelisti. In the summer he competed at the 1988 Olympic Games, finishing sixth both in the qualifying round and in the final. In 1989 he finished fourth at both the European and the 1989 World Indoor Championships.

At his final European Indoor Championships in 1990, Szalma only managed a fifteenth place. At his third Olympic participation, two years later, he did not manage to reach the final of the long jump competition.

He became the Hungarian long jump champion in 1978, 1980, 1981, 1982, 1983, 1985 and 1988, rivalling with Béla Bakosi, Gyula Pálóczi, Zsolt Szabó and Csaba Almási. He also became Hungarian indoor champion in the years 1977 through 1990, except for one year, as Gyula Pálóczi won in 1985. Szalma stands 1.91 m (6 ft 3 in) tall, and during his active career he weighed 90 kilograms (200 lb).

== International competitions ==
Year	Competition	Venue	Position	Event	Notes
Representing Hungary
1975	European Junior Championships	Athens, Greece	11th	Long jump	7.58 m
1976	European Indoor Championships	Munich, West Germany	10th	Long jump	7.36 m
1977	European Indoor Championships	San Sebastián, Spain	3rd	Long jump	7.78 m
1978	European Indoor Championships	Milan, Italy	1st	Long jump	7.83 m
1978	European Championships	Prague, Czechoslovakia	16th (q)	Long jump	7.53 m
1979	Universiade	Mexico City, Mexico	9th (h)	4 × 100 m	40.41 s
1979	Universiade	Mexico City, Mexico	14th (q)	Long jump	7.51 m
1980	European Indoor Championships	Sindelfingen, West Germany	10th	Long jump	7.55 m
1980	Olympic Games	Moscow, Soviet Union	4th	Long jump	8.13 m
1981	European Indoor Championships	Grenoble, France	4th	Long jump	7.90 m
1981	Universiade	Bucharest, Romania	1st	Long jump	8.23 m (w)
1981	World Cup	Rome, Italy	3rd	Long jump	7.65 m^{1}
1982	European Indoor Championships	Milan, Italy	5th	Long jump	7.78 m
1982	European Championships	Athens, Greece	11th	Long jump	7.74 m
1983	European Indoor Championships	Budapest, Hungary	1st	Long jump	7.95 m
1983	World Championships	Helsinki, Finland	4th	Long jump	8.12 m
1984	Friendship Games	Moscow, Soviet Union	4th	Long jump	8.15 m
1985	World Indoor Games	Paris, France	4th	Long jump	7.85 m
1985	European Indoor Championships	Piraeus, Greece	2nd	Long jump	8.15 m
1985	World Cup	Canberra, Australia	3rd	Long jump	8.09 m^{1}
1986	European Indoor Championships	Madrid, Spain	2nd	Long jump	8.24 m
1987	European Indoor Championships	Liévin, France	4th	Long jump	8.07 m
1987	World Indoor Championships	Indianapolis, United States	6th	Long jump	7.87 m
1988	European Indoor Championships	Budapest, Hungary	2nd	Long jump	8.03 m
1988	Olympic Games	Seoul, South Korea	6th	Long jump	8.00 m
1989	European Indoor Championships	The Hague, Netherlands	4th	Long jump	8.06 m
1989	World Indoor Championships	Budapest, Hungary	4th	Long jump	8.10 m
1990	European Indoor Championships	Glasgow, United Kingdom	15th	Long jump	7.56 m
1992	Olympic Games	Barcelona, Spain	34th (q)	Long jump	7.47 m

^{1}Representing Europe
