= Athletics at the 1984 Summer Olympics – Men's long jump =

Men's long jump at the Games of the XXIII Olympiad
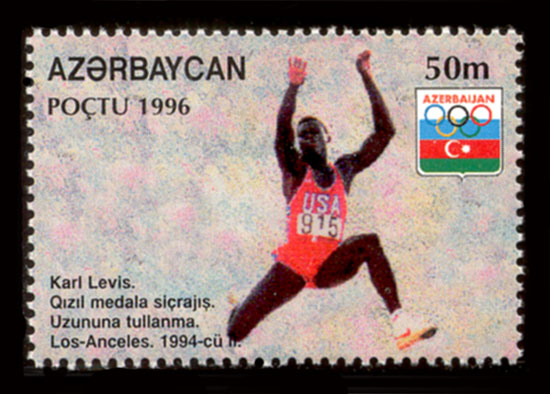
- 1996 stamp of Azerbaijan showing Carl Lewis jumping in 1984
- Venues: Los Angeles Memorial Coliseum
- Dates: 5–6 August
- Competitors: 31 from 25 nations
- Winning distance: 8.54

Medalists
1st place, gold medalist(s)		Carl Lewis; United States
2nd place, silver medalist(s)		Gary Honey; Australia
3rd place, bronze medalist(s)		Giovanni Evangelisti; Italy

Official Video Highlights

The men's long jump was an event at the 1984 Summer Olympics in Los Angeles, California, United States. There were 31 participating athletes from 25 nations, with two qualifying groups, and the final held on August 6, 1984. The maximum number of athletes per nation had been set at 3 since the 1930 Olympic Congress. The event was won by 30 cm by Carl Lewis of the United States, the nation's 17th gold medal in the event. It was Lewis's second gold of the Games as he tried (successfully) to match Jesse Owens's 1936 quadruple (100 metres, 200 metres, 4 × 100 metres relay, and long jump). It was also the first of Lewis's four consecutive gold medals in the long jump and would prove to be his greatest winning margin for the Olympic long jump. Gary Honey gave Australia its first men's long jump medal since 1948; Giovanni Evangelisti won Italy's first-ever medal in the event.

== Background ==
This was the 20th appearance of the event, which is one of 12 athletics events to have been held at every Summer Olympics. The only returning finalist from the 1980 Games was seventh-place finisher Antonio Corgos of Spain. American Carl Lewis was the clear favorite; in the four years since the 1980 Games (which he qualified for but would not have been a favorite at if the United States had competed) he had become "the greatest track & field athlete in the world" with wins in the 100 metres, long jump, and 4 × 100 metres relay at the inaugural 1983 world championships. His teammate Larry Myricks, who would have been the favorite in 1980 but for the boycott and would likely have medaled in 1976 but for a broken foot in warmups, was a significant challenger, as was Gary Honey of Australia, the 1982 Commonwealth champion.

Cameroon, Chad, the People's Republic of China, Cyprus, Kenya, Mali, Paraguay, and the United Arab Emirates each made their first appearance in the event; the Republic of China appeared for the first time as "Chinese Taipei". The United States appeared for the 19th time, most of any nation, having missed only the boycotted 1980 Games.

== Competition format ==
The 1984 competition used the two-round format with divided final introduced in 1952. The qualifying round gave each competitor three jumps to achieve a distance of 7.90 metres; if fewer than 12 men did so, the top 12 (including all those tied) would advance. The final provided each jumper with three jumps; the top eight jumpers received an additional three jumps for a total of six, with the best to count (qualifying round jumps were not considered for the final).

== Records ==
The standing world and Olympic records prior to the event were as follows.

World record	Bob Beamon (USA)	8.90	Mexico City, Mexico	18 October 1968
Olympic record	Bob Beamon (USA)	8.90	Mexico City, Mexico	18 October 1968

No new world or Olympic records were set during the competition.

== Schedule ==
All times are Pacific Daylight Time (UTC-7)

Date	Time	Round
Sunday, 5 August 1984	16:10	Qualifying
Monday, 6 August 1984	17:40	Final

== Results ==
=== Qualifying ===
Rank	Athlete	Nation	1	2	3	Distance	Notes
1	Carl Lewis	United States	8.30	—	—	8.30	Q
2	Larry Myricks	United States	7.80	8.02	—	8.02	Q
3	Junichi Usui	Japan	7.62	8.02	—	8.02	Q
4	Antonio Corgos	Spain	8.02	—	—	8.02	Q
5	Giovanni Evangelisti	Italy	7.94	—	—	7.94	Q
6	Gary Honey	Australia	7.93	—	—	7.93	Q
7	Joey Wells	Bahamas	X	7.92	—	7.92	Q
8	Mike McRae	United States	7.70	7.50	7.89	7.89	q
9	Kim Jong-Il	South Korea	X	7.67	7.86	7.86	q
10	Liu Yuhuang	China	7.83	X	7.73	7.83	q
11	Yusuf Alli	Nigeria	7.65	7.43	7.82	7.82	q
12	Jubobaraye Kio	Nigeria	X	7.76	X	7.76	q
13	René Gloor	Switzerland	7.57	7.71	7.58	7.71	
14	Nenad Stekić	Yugoslavia	7.60	7.41	7.45	7.60	
15	Lester Benjamin	Antigua and Barbuda	X	7.44	7.57	7.57	
16	Moses Kiyai	Kenya	X	7.51	X	7.51	
17	Kémobé Djirmassal	Chad	7.01	7.11	7.51	7.37	
18	Wang Shijie	China	X	7.22	7.36	7.36	
19	Lyndon Sands	Bahamas	7.32	5.95	7.22	7.32	
20	Lee Fu-an	Chinese Taipei	7.23	6.96	6.82	7.23	
21	Steve Hanna	Bahamas	6.97	2.36	7.10	7.10	
22	Kristján Harðarson	Iceland	X	7.09	6.93	7.09	
23	Shahad Mubarak	United Arab Emirates	6.98	X	—	6.98	
24	Fidel Solórzano	Ecuador	6.93	6.84	6.90	6.93	
25	Abdoulaye Traoré	Mali	6.92	6.36	6.60	6.92	
26	Bilanday Bodjona	Togo	6.82	6.70	6.75	6.82	
27	Ghabi Issa Khouri	Lebanon	6.25	X	6.80	6.80	
28	Oscar Diesel	Paraguay	6.45	6.78	6.73	6.78	
29	Ernest Tché-Noubossie	Cameroon	6.76	6.57	6.52	6.76	
30	Dimitrios Araouzos	Cyprus	X	X	5.67	5.67	
—	Steve Walsh	New Zealand	X	X	X	No mark	
—	Ronald Desruelles	Belgium	DNS				
—	Francis Dodoo	Ghana	DNS				
—	Paul Emordi	Nigeria	DNS				

=== Final ===
Rank	Athlete	Nation	1	2	3	4	5	6	Distance
1st place, gold medalist(s)	Carl Lewis	United States	8.54	X	—	—	—	—	8.54
2nd place, silver medalist(s)	Gary Honey	Australia	7.97	7.92	8.18	7.92	X	8.24	8.24
3rd place, bronze medalist(s)	Giovanni Evangelisti	Italy	8.09	7.94	7.90	X	X	8.24	8.24
4	Larry Myricks	United States	8.06	7.99	X	8.00	8.16	6.28	8.16
5	Liu Yuhuang	China	X	7.66	7.89	7.65	7.60	7.99	7.99
6	Joey Wells	Bahamas	7.97	X	X	—	—	—	7.97
7	Junichi Usui	Japan	7.63	7.82	7.87	7.72	7.09	—	7.87
8	Kim Jong-Il	South Korea	7.76	7.81	7.77	X	7.59	X	7.81
9	Yusuf Alli	Nigeria	7.67	7.78	7.72	Did not advance			7.78
10	Antonio Corgos	Spain	7.44	7.50	7.69	Did not advance			7.69
11	Mike McRae	United States	X	7.63	7.45	Did not advance			7.63
12	Jubobaraye Kio	Nigeria	X	7.57	X	Did not advance			7.57

== See also ==
- 1982 Men's European Championships Long Jump (Athens)
- 1983 Men's World Championships Long Jump (Helsinki)
- 1984 Men's Friendship Games Long Jump (Moscow)
- 1986 Men's European Championships Long Jump (Stuttgart)
- 1987 Men's World Championships Long Jump (Rome)
