= Athletics at the 1981 Summer Universiade – Men's long jump =

The men's long jump event at the 1981 Summer Universiade was held at the Stadionul Naţional in Bucharest on 23 and 24 July 1981.

== Medalists ==
Gold	Silver	Bronze
László Szalma; Hungary	Liu Yuhuang; China	Ubaldo Duany; Cuba

== Results ==
=== Qualification ===
Rank	Group	Athlete	Nationality	Result	Notes
1	?	Liu Yuhuang	China	7.89	
2	?	László Szalma	Hungary	7.75	
3	?	Stanisław Jaskułka	Poland	7.68	
4	?	Ubaldo Duany	Cuba	7.67	
4	?	Arvydas Sabonis	Soviet Union	7.67	
4	?	László Szenczi	Hungary	7.67	
7	?	Junichi Usui	Japan	7.64	
8	?	Gheorghe Lina	Romania	7.58	
9	?	Stanley Holmes	United States	7.57	
10	?	Yevgeniy Anikin	Soviet Union	7.55	
11	?	Alberto Solanas	Spain	7.48	
12	?	Liviu Focsaneanu	Romania	7.46	
13	?	Jason Grimes	United States	7.45	
14	?	Hristos Hristosostomu	Greece	7.36	
15	?	Joshua Kio	Nigeria	7.34	
15	?	Ivan Tuparov	Bulgaria	7.34	
15	?	Dimitrios Araouzos	Cyprus	7.34	
18	?	Pierrino Pampuri	Switzerland	7.31	
19	?	Reynaldo Quinóñes	Puerto Rico	7.12	
20	?	Giovanni Evangelisti	Italy	7.06	
21	?	Mohamed Bishty	Libya	7.04	
22	?	Gabi Issa Khouri	Lebanon	6.90	
23	?	Mirihij Mahdi	Iraq	6.46	
24	?	Yukihiro Minami	Mexico	6.41	

=== Final ===
Rank	Athlete	Nationality	Result	Notes
1st place, gold medalist(s)	László Szalma	Hungary	8.23 (w)	
2nd place, silver medalist(s)	Liu Yuhuang	China	8.11	
3rd place, bronze medalist(s)	Ubaldo Duany	Cuba	8.10	
4	Arvydas Sabonis	Soviet Union	8.04	
5	Yevgeniy Anikin	Soviet Union	8.00	
6	Gheorghe Lina	Romania	7.98	
7	László Szenczi	Hungary	7.91	
8	Stanisław Jaskułka	Poland	7.74	
9	Junichi Usui	Japan	7.72	
10	Stanley Holmes	United States	7.72	
11	Alberto Solanas	Spain	7.59	
12	Liviu Focsaneanu	Romania	7.53	
