= 1983 World Championships in Athletics – Men's long jump =

These are the official results of the Men's Long Jump event at the 1983 IAAF World Championships in Helsinki, Finland. There were a total of 34 participating athletes, with two qualifying groups and the final held on 10 August 1983.

== Medalists ==
Gold	Carl Lewis; United States (USA)
Silver	Jason Grimes; United States (USA)
Bronze	Mike Conley; United States (USA)

== Schedule ==
- All times are Eastern European Time (UTC+2)

Qualification Round
Group A	Group B
09.08.1983 – ??:??h	09.08.1983 – ??:??h
Final Round
10.08.1983 – ??:??h

== Abbreviations ==
- All results shown are in metres

Q	automatic qualification
q	qualification by rank
DNS	did not start
NM	no mark
WR	world record
AR	area record
NR	national record
PB	personal best
SB	season best

== Records ==
Standing records prior to the 1983 World Athletics Championships
World Record	Bob Beamon (USA)	8.90 m	October 18, 1968	Mexico City, Mexico
Event Record	New event			

== Qualification ==
=== Group A ===
Rank	Overall	Athlete	Attempts			Distance	Note
Rank	Overall	Athlete	1	2	3	Distance	Note
1	2	Jason Grimes (USA)	8.29	—	—	8.29 m	
2	3	Gary Honey (AUS)	X	8.12	—	8.12 m	
3	5	Antonio Corgos (ESP)	7.32	X	8.05	8.05 m	
4	6	Oganes Stepanyan (URS)	7.82	7.88	8.01	8.01 m	
5	8	Atanas Atanasov (BUL)	7.96	—	—	7.96 m	
6	11	Mike Conley (USA)	7.88	7.89	7.90	7.90 m	
7	12	Nenad Stekić (YUG)	7.88	7.88	7.64	7.88 m	
8	13	Lee Mu-tsai (TPE)	7.44	7.51	7.88	7.88 m	
9	15	Lester Benjamin (ATG)	7.81	7.78	7.41	7.81 m	
10	17	Stephen Walsh (NZL)	X	X	7.75	7.75 m	
11	18	Gyula Pálóczi (HUN)	7.42	7.70	7.40	7.70 m	
12	19	Giovanni Evangelisti (ITA)	X	7.70	X	7.70 m	
13	26	Chan Ka-chiu (HKG)	X	X	7.31	7.31 m	
14	27	Bilanday Bodjona (TOG)	7.15	6.91	6.82	7.15 m	
—	—	Steve Hanna (BAH)				DNS	
—	—	Ian James (CAN)				DNS	
—	—	Vlastimil Mařinec (TCH)				DNS	

=== Group B ===
Rank	Overall	Athlete	Attempts			Distance	Note
Rank	Overall	Athlete	1	2	3	Distance	Note
1	1	Carl Lewis (USA)	8.37	—	—	8.37 m	
2	4	Yusuf Alli (NGR)	8.11	—	—	8.11 m	
3	7	László Szalma (HUN)	7.97	—	—	7.97 m	
4	9	Gheorghe Cojocaru (ROU)	7.92	—	—	7.92 m	
5	10	Jan Leitner (TCH)	7.90	—	—	7.90 m	
6	14	Sergey Rodin (URS)	6.95	X	7.87	7.87 m	
7	16	Liu Yuhuang (CHN)	X	X	7.77	7.77 m	
8	20	Joey Wells (BAH)	6.44	7.69	X	7.69 m	
9	21	René Gloor (SUI)	X	7.68	X	7.68 m	
10	22	Jarmo Karna (FIN)	7.56	7.54	X	7.56 m	
11	23	Marco Piochi (ITA)	7.29	7.42	7.52	7.52 m	
12	24	Björn Johansson (SWE)	5.78	7.51	6.96	7.51 m	
13	25	Wilfredo Almonte (DOM)	7.38	X	7.21	7.38 m	
14	28	Laoui Adnan Abou (JOR)	X	7.06	7.12	7.12 m	
15	29	Mohamed Abdulla Abdelaslam (LBA)	X	6.76	6.54	6.76 m	
16	30	Said Al-Marhubi (OMA)	X	6.20	5.80	6.20 m	
—	—	Atanas Chochev (BUL)	X	X	X	NM	

== Final ==
Rank	Athlete	Attempts						Distance	Note
Rank	Athlete	1	2	3	4	5	6	Distance	Note
1st place, gold medalist(s)	Carl Lewis (USA)	8.55	—	8.42	—	—	—	8.55 m	CR
2nd place, silver medalist(s)	Jason Grimes (USA)	8.29	X	8.23	8.29	X	8.17	8.29 m	
3rd place, bronze medalist(s)	Mike Conley (USA)	X	8.06	X	8.12	8.12	X	8.12 m	
4	László Szalma (HUN)	X	7.93	X	8.09	8.08	8.12	8.12 m	
5	Nenad Stekić (YUG)	7.80	5.54	7.94	5.99	7.76	8.09	8.09 m	
6	Gary Honey (AUS)	7.86	7.93	8.06	X	7.94	7.96	8.06 m	
7	Antonio Corgos (ESP)	7.94	7.79	7.92	7.91	8.06	X	8.06 m	
8	Yusuf Alli (NGR)	7.89	X	7.89	7.85	7.89	7.74	7.89 m	
9	Gheorghe Cojocaru (ROU)	7.81	7.88	7.70				7.88 m	
10	Jan Leitner (TCH)	7.64	7.84	7.80				7.84 m	
11	Oganes Stepanyan (URS)	7.74	X	7.59				7.74 m	
12	Atanas Atanasov (BUL)	7.52	7.69	7.54				7.69 m	
13	Lee Mu-Tsai (TPE)	7.57	6.89	7.09				7.57 m	

== See also ==
- 1980 Men's Olympic Long Jump (Moscow)
- 1982 Men's European Championships Long Jump (Athens)
- 1984 Men's Olympic Long Jump (Los Angeles)
- 1986 Men's European Championships Long Jump (Stuttgart)
- 1987 Men's World Championships Long Jump (Rome)
