= Athletics at the 1979 Summer Universiade – Men's long jump =

The men's long jump event at the 1979 Summer Universiade was held at the Estadio Olimpico Universitario in Mexico City on 8 and 9 September 1979.

== Medalists ==
Gold	Silver	Bronze
Valeriy Pidluzhnyy; Soviet Union	Junichi Usui; Japan	LaMonte King; United States

== Results ==
=== Qualification ===
Rank	Group	Athlete	Nationality	#1	#2	#3	Result	Notes
1	B	Nenad Stekić	Yugoslavia	8.10	8.21	8.00	8.21	
2	B	Ned Armour	United States				7.98	
3	B	Valeriy Pidluzhnyy	Soviet Union				7.90	
4	A	Lutz Franke	East Germany				7.89	
5	A	Stanisław Jaskułka	Poland				7.85	
6	A	Carlos Amador	Cuba				7.77	
7	A	LaMonte King	United States				7.76	
8	B	Włodzimierz Włodarczyk	Poland				7.75	
9	B	Junichi Usui	Japan				7.69	
10	B	Frank Paschek	East Germany				7.62	
11	A	Alberto Solanas	Spain				7.55	
12	A	Liu Yuhuang	China				7.55	
13	A	Viktor Belskiy	Soviet Union				7.53	
14	B	László Szalma	Hungary				7.51	
15	B	Dimitrios Araouzos	Greece				7.43	
16	A	Georgi Doinov	Bulgaria				7.41	
17	B	Jaroslav Priščák	Czechoslovakia				7.35	
18	?	Jesús Aguilasocho	Mexico				7.17	
18	?	Ronald Raborg	Peru				7.17	
20	A	Dimitrios Delifotis	Greece				6.93	
21	A	Pekka Suvitie	Finland				6.92	
22	?	Abdelmajid Ben Cheikh	Morocco				6.83	
23	?	Antoine Kiakouama	Congo				6.55	
24	?	Ricardo Campbell	Costa Rica				6.39	
25	?	Douglas Mandla Mkhonza	Swaziland				5.81	
	?	Jorge García	Mexico				NM	

=== Final ===
Rank	Athlete	Nationality	Result	Notes
1st place, gold medalist(s)	Valeriy Pidluzhnyy	Soviet Union	8.16	
2nd place, silver medalist(s)	Junichi Usui	Japan	8.05	
3rd place, bronze medalist(s)	LaMonte King	United States	7.99	
4	Frank Paschek	East Germany	7.98	
5	Nenad Stekić	Yugoslavia	7.97	
6	Lutz Franke	East Germany	7.90	
7	Alberto Solanas	Spain	7.74	
8	Stanisław Jaskułka	Poland	7.58	
9	Ned Armour	United States	7.48	
10	Liu Yuhuang	China	7.38	
11	Włodzimierz Włodarczyk	Poland	7.28	
12	Carlos Amador	Cuba	7.27	
