= Klocke =

Klocke is a surname of German origin. Notable people with the surname include:

- Arndt Klocke (born 1971), German politician
- Jörg Klocke (born 1960), West German long jumper
- Piet Klocke (born 1957), German musician, cabaret artist, author and actor
