= 1975 European Athletics Indoor Championships – Men's long jump =

The men's long jump event at the 1975 European Athletics Indoor Championships was held on 8 March in Katowice.

== Results ==
Rank	Name	Nationality	#1	#2	#3	#4	#5	#6	Result	Notes
1st place, gold medalist(s)	Jacques Rousseau	France	x	7.47	7.75	7.94	7.94	7.28	7.94	
2nd place, silver medalist(s)	Hans-Jürgen Berger	West Germany							7.87	
3rd place, bronze medalist(s)	Zbigniew Beta	Poland							7.82	
4	Philippe Deroche	France							7.77	
5	Carol Corbu	Romania							7.64	
6	Joachim Busse	West Germany							7.49	
7	Ulf Jarfelt	Sweden							7.42	
8	Jaroslav Prišcák	Czechoslovakia							7.33	
9	Panayiotis Hatzistathis	Greece							5.48	
	Aleksey Pereverzev	Soviet Union	x	x	x				NM	
