= Nenad Stekić =

Yugoslav long jumper (1951–2021)

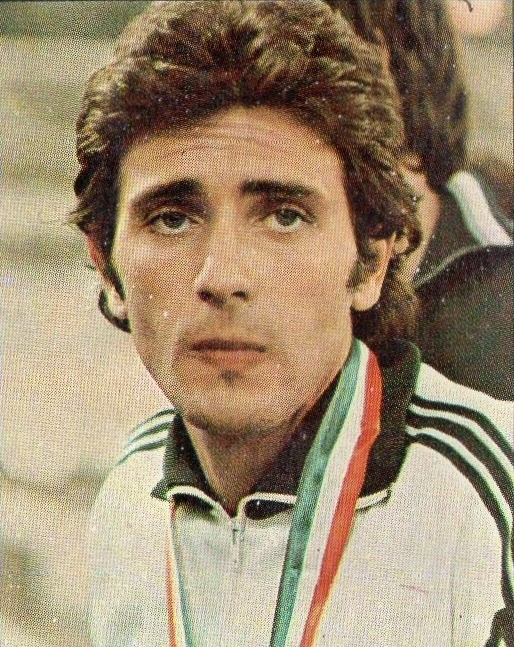
- Nenad Stekic (1976)

Personal information
- Born: 5 March 1951 Belgrade, Yugoslavia
- Died: 18 July 2021 (aged 70) Belgrade, Serbia

Sport
- Sport: Track and field
Medal record
Representing Yugoslavia
European Championship
| Silver medal – second place | 1974 Rome | Long jump |
| Silver medal – second place | 1978 Prague | Long jump |
European Indoor Championship
| Silver medal – second place | 1980 Sindelfingen | Long jump |
Mediterranean Games
| Gold medal – first place | 1975 Algiers | Long jump |
| Gold medal – first place | 1979 Split | Long jump |
Summer Universiade
| Gold medal – first place | 1977 Sofia | Long jump |
| Silver medal – second place | 1975 Rome | Long Jump |
European Junior Championship
| Bronze medal – third place | 1970 Paris | Long jump |

Nenad Stekić (Serbian Cyrillic: Ненад Стекић; 7 March 1951 – 18 July 2021) was a Serbian and Yugoslav long jumper, best known for his European record of 8.45 metres, second only to Bob Beamon's world record at the time.

== Career ==
=== Performances in Europe ===
Nenad Stekić failed on many occasions to determine himself as a major force, but during his 20-year career he won many international medals and setting several national records and one European record. He finished third at the 1970 European Junior Championships in Paris, and improved over the years, capturing his first Yugoslav title in 1972. He retained it the following year with 7.96 m jump and went on to win his first title at the Balkan Games in Athens with a wind-assisted distance of 8.12 m. In 1974 he set a new national record of 8.24 m (second best in the world that year) and retained his national and Balkan titles. Later in the year, he competed at the European Championships in Rome and was the biggest gold medal contender. There he won his first major medal when he produced a leap of 8.04 m to finish in second place, beaten by Soviet competitor Valeriy Podluzhny. Stekic had a phenomenal season in 1975, highlighted by a new European record in the long-jump on 25 July at Montreal, the second best jump of 8.45 m in the history, after Beamon's world record. That same year, he became champion at the Mediterranean Games in Algiers with a wind-aided 8.23 m and came second at the World Student Games in Rome, producing 8.13 m. In 1975 Stekić topped the year's lists for the first time in his career, making him a was strong contender for an Olympic medal in Montreal the following year, and he showed fine form when he jumped 8.39 m on 2 June at Turin prior to the Games. However, he finished 6th in the long-jump final at Montreal, with a best jump of 7.89 m.

=== Second European silver at Prague ===
Coming from the Olympic disappointment, Stekic again had very successful season in 1977, recording his best long-jump of the year of 8.27 m to again top the rest of the world. He won the gold medal at the World Student Games at Sofia and again produced many long-jumps over 8 m, winning the Yugoslav Championships with a leap of 8.14 m. Stekic was chosen to represent Europe at the first World Cup held in Düsseldorf, but there he again showed inconsistency when he reached modest 7.79 m to place him 4th. Stekic topped the world for the third time in previous four years in 1978 when he recorded the long-jump of 8.32 m on 16 September at Rovereto. If he produced it one week earlier, he would be a European champion, but in the long-jump final at the continental Champs in Prague, Stekic managed to jump 8.12 m to earn another silver medal, 6 cm behind the gold medalist, Jaques Rousseau (France). He competed at similar level in 1979 and produced 4th best long-jump of the year when winning his fifth Balkan title at the Games in Athens. Stekic also successfully retained his Mediterranean title when winning on home soil at Split in a championship record of 8.21 m. In his preparation for the 1980 Olympic Games at Moscow, Stekic won his only medal (silver) at the European Indoor Championships at Sindelfingen and his sixth and final gold at the Balkan Games at Sofia with his season's best of 8.11 m. Sadly, Stekic injured himself in his very first jump in qualifying round at the Olympics, but continued to compete for a decade after that despite far from the form from the '70s. He finished 5th at the 1982 European Championships in Athens and had rather solid season in 1983, winning the European B Cup at Prague with 8.04 m and finishing creditable 5th at the inaugural World Championships at Helsinki with a leap of 8.09 m. He did not qualify for another Olympic final in 1984, and won his final Yugoslav title in 1985. Stekic did not compete at the 1986 European Championships in Stuttgart despite producing season's best of 8.19 m and then competed only sparingly until 1991. In the late '80s, Stekić amassed the most jumps over the 8 m mark (later surpassed by Larry Myricks). He is one of the most decorated athletes from former Yugoslavia.

== Achievements ==
| Year | Competition | Venue | Position | Notes |
Representing Yugoslavia
| 1970 | Universiade | Turin, Italy | 4th | 7.67 m |
| 1970 | European Junior Championships | Paris, France | 3rd | 7.75 m |
| 1973 | Universiade | Moscow, Soviet Union | 9th | 7.47 m |
| 1974 | European Championships | Rome, Italy | 2nd | 8.05 m (+1.5 m/s) |
| 1975 | Universiade | Rome, Italy | 2nd | 8.13 m |
| 1975 | Mediterranean Games | Algiers, Algeria | 1st | 8.23 m w |
| 1976 | Olympic Games | Montreal, Canada | 6th | 7.89 m |
| 1977 | Universiade | Sofia, Bulgaria | 1st | 7.97 m |
| 1978 | European Championships | Prague, Czechoslovakia | 2nd | 8.12 m |
| 1979 | Universiade | Mexico City, Mexico | 5th | 7.97 m |
| 1979 | Mediterranean Games | Split, Yugoslavia | 1st | 8.21 m CR |
| 1980 | European Indoor Championships | Sindelfingen, West Germany | 2nd | 7.91 m |
| 1980 | Olympic Games | Moscow, Soviet Union | 30th | 5.75 m |
| 1982 | European Championships | Athens, Greece | 5th | 7.93 m (-0.5 m/s) |
| 1983 | World Championships | Helsinki, Finland | 5th | 8.09 m |
| 1984 | Olympic Games | Los Angeles, United States | 14th | 7.60 m |
| 1986 | European Indoor Championships | Madrid, Spain | 12th | 7.61 m |
| 1990 | European Championships | Split, Yugoslavia | — | NM |

== See also ==
- Serbian records in athletics

Awards
| Preceded by Mate Parlov | (Socialist Federal Republic of Yugoslavia) The Best Athlete of Yugoslavia; 1975 | Succeeded by Matija Ljubek |
| Preceded by Mate Parlov | Yugoslav Sportsman of the Year; 1975 | Succeeded by Matija Ljubek |
Records
| Preceded by (West Germany) Josef Schwarz | Men's Long jump European Record Holder; 25 July 1975 – 5 July 1980 | Succeeded by (East Germany) Lutz Dombrowski |
Sporting positions
| Preceded by (United States) Arnie Robinson | Men's Long Jump Best Year Performance; 1975 | Succeeded by (United States) Arnie Robinson |
| Preceded by (United States) Arnie Robinson | Men's Long Jump Best Year Performance; 1977–1978 | Succeeded by (United States) Larry Myricks |
