= Klepsch =

Klepsch is a German surname. Notable people with this surname include:

- Barbara Klepsch (born 1965), German politician
- Egon Klepsch (1930–2010), German politician
- Winfried Klepsch (born 1956), German long jumper
