= 1977 European Athletics Indoor Championships – Men's long jump =

The men's long jump event at the 1977 European Athletics Indoor Championships was held on 13 March in San Sebastián.

== Results ==
| Rank | Name | Nationality | #1 | #2 | #3 | #4 | #5 | #6 | Result | Notes |
|---|---|---|---|---|---|---|---|---|---|---|
| 1st place, gold medalist(s) | Hans Baumgartner | West Germany | 7.82 | 7.59 | x | 7.96 | x | x | 7.96 | |
| 2nd place, silver medalist(s) | Lutz Franke | East Germany | 7.62 | 7.83 | 7.89 | 7.87 | 7.88 | 7.59 | 7.89 | |
| 3rd place, bronze medalist(s) | László Szalma | Hungary | 7.52 | 7.78 | 7.63 | 7.71 | 7.62 | 7.22 | 7.78 | |
| 4 | Stanisław Jaskułka | Poland | 7.43 | x | 7.65 | x | 7.60 | 7.68 | 7.68 | |
| 5 | Frank Wartenberg | East Germany | x | 7.68 | x | x | 7.43 | x | 7.68 | |
| 6 | Carlo Arrighi | Italy | 7.54 | 7.38 | 7.61 | x | x | x | 7.61 | |
| 7 | Åke Fransson | Sweden | 7.53 | 7.50 | 7.61 | 7.39 | x | 7.42 | 7.61 | |
| 8 | Gilbert Zante | France | 7.60 | 7.47 | 7.58 | 7.59 | x | 7.19 | 7.60 | |
| 9 | Rafael Blanquer | Spain | 7.59 | x | x | | | | 7.59 | |
| 10 | Rolf Bernhard | Switzerland | 7.45 | 7.29 | 7.18 | | | | 7.45 | |
| 11 | Aleksey Pereverzev | Soviet Union | 7.06 | 7.43 | 7.19 | | | | 7.43 | |
| 12 | Panayiotis Hatzistathis | Greece | 7.41 | x | 7.25 | | | | 7.41 | |
| 13 | Helmut Klöck | West Germany | x | 7.23 | 7.36 | | | | 7.36 | |
| 14 | Ronald Desruelles | Belgium | 7.36 | x | 7.12 | | | | 7.36 | |
