= Athletics at the 1989 Summer Universiade – Men's long jump =

The men's long jump event at the 1989 Summer Universiade was held at the Wedaustadion in Duisburg on 25 and 27 August 1989.

== Medalists ==
| Gold | Silver | Bronze |
|---|---|---|
| Jaime Jefferson; Cuba | Vladimir Ratushkov; Soviet Union | Llewellyn Starks; United States |

== Results ==
=== Qualification ===
Qualifying distance: 7.55 metres

| Rank | Group | Athlete | Nationality | Result | Notes |
|---|---|---|---|---|---|
| 1 | B | Redzinaldas Stasaitis | Soviet Union | 7.85 | Q |
| 2 | A | Ma Minggui | China | 7.84 | Q |
| 3 | B | Llewellyn Starks | United States | 7.81 | Q |
| 4 | A | Ángel Hernández | Spain | 7.74 | Q |
| 5 | A | Dimitros Hatzopoulos | Greece | 7.73 | Q |
| 6 | A | Christian Thomas | West Germany | 7.72 | Q |
| 7 | A | Liang Chao | China | 7.70 | Q |
| 8 | A | Csaba Almási | Hungary | 7.69 | Q |
| 9 | B | Nai Hui-fang | Chinese Taipei | 7.68 | Q |
| 10 | B | Mirosław Kopyciński | Poland | 7.67 | Q |
| 11 | B | Jaime Jefferson | Cuba | 7.62 | Q |
| 12 | A | Vladimir Ratushkov | Soviet Union | 7.57 | Q |
| 13 | A | Luis Bueno | Cuba | 7.57 | Q |
| 14 | A | Borut Bilač | Yugoslavia | 7.51 | |
| 15 | B | André Ester | United States | 7.50 | |
| 16 | A | Juha Plosila | Finland | 7.49 | |
| 17 | B | Siniša Ergotić | Yugoslavia | 7.48 | |
| 18 | B | Dario Ruiz | Mexico | 7.45 | |
| 19 | ? | Lotfi Khaïda | Algeria | 7.40 | |
| 20 | A | Björn Johansson | Sweden | 7.38 | |
| 21 | ? | Zsolt Szabó | Hungary | 7.31 | |
| 22 | ? | Cristiano Laurino | Brazil | 7.30 | |
| 23 | ? | Rami Lev-Ran | Israel | 7.18 | |
| 24 | B | Axel Dimmel | West Germany | 7.13 | |
| 25 | ? | Benjamin Koech | Kenya | 7.06 | |
| 26 | ? | Feed Nzuku | Kenya | 7.03 | |
| 27 | ? | Erim May | Turkey | 6.81 | |
| 28 | ? | Murat Ayaydın | Turkey | 6.77 | |
| 29 | ? | Zuong Duc Thuy | Vietnam | 6.56 | |

=== Final ===
| Rank | Athlete | Nationality | Result | Notes |
|---|---|---|---|---|
| 1st place, gold medalist(s) | Jaime Jefferson | Cuba | 7.98 | |
| 2nd place, silver medalist(s) | Vladimir Ratushkov | Soviet Union | 7.96 | |
| 3rd place, bronze medalist(s) | Llewellyn Starks | United States | 7.91 | |
| 4 | Ángel Hernández | Spain | 7.81w | |
| 5 | Redzinaldas Stasaitis | Soviet Union | 7.79w | |
| 6 | Luis Bueno | Cuba | 7.64 | |
| 7 | Csaba Almási | Hungary | 7.63 | |
| 8 | Nai Hui-fang | Chinese Taipei | 7.62w | |
| 9 | Christian Thomas | West Germany | 7.62 | |
| 10 | Dimitros Hatzopoulos | Greece | 7.54 | |
| 11 | Mirosław Kopyciński | Poland | 7.47 | |
| 12 | Ma Minggui | China | 7.46 | |
| 13 | Liang Chao | China | 7.43 | |
