= 1976 European Athletics Indoor Championships – Men's long jump =

The men's long jump event at the 1976 European Athletics Indoor Championships was held on 22 February in Munich.

== Results ==
Rank	Name	Nationality	Result	Notes
1st place, gold medalist(s)	Jacques Rousseau	France	7.90	
2nd place, silver medalist(s)	Valeriy Podluzhniy	Soviet Union	7.79	
3rd place, bronze medalist(s)	Joachim Busse	West Germany	7.72	
4	Roberto Veglia	Italy	7.71	
5	Aleksey Pereverzev	Soviet Union	7.62	
6	Alberto Albero	Italy	7.60	
7	Stefan Lazarescu	Romania	7.57	
8	Dumitru Iordache	Romania	7.41	
9	Saturnino Rodríguez	Spain	7.38	
10	László Szálma	Hungary	7.36	
11	Yevgeniy Shubin	Soviet Union	7.36	
12	Marek Szczepański	Poland	7.31	
