= 1979 European Athletics Indoor Championships – Men's long jump =

The men's long jump event at the 1979 European Athletics Indoor Championships was held on 25 February in Vienna.

== Results ==
Rank	Name	Nationality	Result	Notes
1st place, gold medalist(s)	Vladimir Tsepelyov	Soviet Union	7.88	
2nd place, silver medalist(s)	Valeriy Podluzhniy	Soviet Union	7.86	
3rd place, bronze medalist(s)	Lutz Franke	East Germany	7.80	
4	Ronald Desruelles	Belgium	7.79	
5	Jan Leitner	Czechoslovakia	7.68	
6	Grzegorz Cybulski	Poland	7.63	
7	Marco Piochi	Italy	7.60	
