= 1970 European Athletics Junior Championships =

- Level: Under 20
- Events: 35

The 1970 European Athletics Junior Championships was the inaugural edition of the biennial athletics competition for European athletes aged under twenty. It was held in Colombes, near Paris, France, between 11 and 13 September.

== Men's results ==
| Event | Gold | | Silver | | Bronze | |
|---|---|---|---|---|---|---|
| 100 metres | Franz-Peter Hofmeister (FRG) | 10.61 | Dominique Chauvelot (FRA) | 10.65 | Jean-Paul Dubuisson (FRA) | 10.73 |
| 200 metres | Franz-Peter Hofmeister (FRG) | 21.49 | Aleksandr Zhidkikh (URS) | 21.80 | Sergey Korovin (URS) | 21.80 |
| 400 metres | Peter Beaven (GBR) | 47.11 | Ulrich Reich (FRG) | 47.36 | Andreas Scheibe (GDR) | 47.65 |
| 800 metres | Hans-Henning Ohlert (GDR) | 1:50.96 | Vladimir Zimin (URS) | 1:51.39 | Ulrich Keufner (GDR) | 1:51.41 |
| 1500 metres | Klaus-Peter Justus (GDR) | 3:51.39 | Paul-Heinz Wellmann (FRG) | 3:51.79 | Francisco Morera (ESP) | 3:52.48 |
| 3000 metres | Herman Mignon (BEL) | 8:08.73 | John Boggis (GBR) | 8:10.43 | Yuriy Korchenkov (URS) | 8:11.15 |
| 110 m hurdles | Berwyn Price (GBR) | 14.21 | Mirosław Wodzyński (POL) | 14.22 | Klaus Fiedler (GDR) | 14.22 |
| 400 m hurdles | Dmitriy Stukalov (URS) | 50.30 | Jean-Pierre Perrot (FRA) | 50.45 | Yevgeniy Gavrilenko (URS) | 50.72 |
| 2000 m s'chase | Bronisław Malinowski (POL) | 5:44.00 | Juhani Huhtinen (FIN) | 5:45.48 | Elek Sari (HUN) | 5:45.48 |
| 10,000 m walk | Lutz Lipowski (GDR) | 43:35.6 | Peter Schuster (FRG) | 44:02.0 | Mikhail Alekseyev (URS) | 44:19.4 |
| 4 × 100 m relay | Soviet Union (URS); Valeriy Pidluzhnyy; Aleksandr Zhidkikh; Vladimir Lovetskiy; Sergey Korovin | 40.18 | France (FRA); Michel Limousin; Patrick Deroch; Jean-Paul Dubuisson; Philippe Leroux | 40.27 | West Germany (FRG); Manfred Schumann; Thomas van Wickeren; Michael van Wickeren; Franz-Peter Hofmeister | 40.55 |
| 4 × 400 m relay | Soviet Union (URS); Yevgeniy Gavrilenko; Nikolay Kornyushkin; Dmitriy Stukalov; Semyon Kocher | 3:11.2 | France (FRA); Claude Dumont; Patrick Salvador; Daniel Raoult; Lionel Malingre | 3:11.5 | West Germany (FRG); Ulrich Reich; Johannes Dickhut; Bernd Herrmann; Wolfgang Druschky | 3:11.7 |
| Pole vault | François Tracanelli (FRA) | 5.20 m | Serge Lefevbre (FRA) | 4.80 m | Romuald Murawski (POL) | 4.80 m |
| High jump | Jiří Palkovský (TCH) | 2.18 m | Csaba Dosa (ROM) | 2.16 m | Ferenc Doczi (HUN) | 2.06 m |
| Long jump | Valeriy Pidluzhnyy (URS) | 7.87 m | Jacques Rousseau (FRA) | 7.81 m | Nenad Stekić (YUG) | 7.75 m |
| Triple jump | Valeriy Pidluzhnyy (URS) | 16.25 m | Anatoliy Golubtsov (URS) | 16.05 m | Gábor Katona (HUN) | 16.03 m |
| Shot put | Wolfgang Barthel (FRG) | 18.10 m | Manfred Kaiser (GDR) | 17.40 m | Jan Skoupy (TCH) | 17.11 m |
| Discus throw | Aleksandr Nazhimov (URS) | 54.18 m | Lothar Schlage (GDR) | 53.96 m | Pal Szauer (HUN) | 53.00 m |
| Javelin throw | Aimo Puska (FIN) | 76.98 m | Aleksandr Makarov (URS) | 74.92 m | Wolfgang Hanisch (GDR) | 73..22 m |
| Hammer throw | Todor Manolov (BUL) | 65.16 m | Aleksey Spiridonov (URS) | 64.88 m | Sergey Korobov (URS) | 64.32 m |
| Decathlon | Aleksandr Blinayev (URS) | 7632 pts | Eberhard Stroot (FRG) | 7584 pts | Frank Nusse (NED) | 7129 pts |

== Women's results ==
| Event | Gold | | Silver | | Bronze | |
|---|---|---|---|---|---|---|
| 100 metres | Helena Kerner (POL) | 12.10 | Andrea Lynch (GBR) | 12.19 | Helen Golden (GBR) | 12.23 |
| 200 metres | Helen Golden (GBR) | 24.34 | Annegret Kroniger (FRG) | 24.64 | Véronique Grandrieux (FRA) | 24.72 |
| 400 metres | Monika Zehrt (GDR) | 54.00 | Bozena Zientarska (POL) | 54.61 | Brigitte Rohde (GDR) | 54.07 |
| 800 metres | Waltraud Pöhland (GDR) | 2:05.29 | Sylvia Schenk (FRG) | 2:05.30 | Galina Vaingarten (URS) | 2:06.45 |
| 1500 metres | Katrin Clausnitzer (GDR) | 4:24.17 | Christine Haskett (GBR) | 4:27.16 | Olga Dvirna (URS) | 4:28.17 |
| 100 m hurdles | Grażyna Rabsztyn (POL) | 14.06 | Monika Hys (GDR) | 14.11 | Margarete Leidel (FRG) | 14.51 |
| 4 × 100 m relay | Poland (POL); Aniela Szubert; Elzbieta Nowak; Urszula Soszka; Helena Kerner | 45.26 | West Germany (FRG); Liesel Bömelburg; Annegret Kroniger; Ellen Walter; Elvira Springsguth | 45.27 | East Germany (GDR); Evelin Kaufer; Ellen Stropahl; Marion Wagner; Monika Meyer | 45.47 |
| 4 × 400 m relay | East Germany (GDR); Brigitte Rohde; Renate Marder; Brigitte Ullmann; Monika Zehrt | 3:40.2 | Poland (POL); Aniela Szubert; Krystyna Lech; Danuta Gaska; Bożena Zientarska | 3:44.0 | Sweden (SWE); Ragnhild Skoog; Margaretha Larsson; Gunhild Skoog; Monica Bergendahl | 3:46.7 |
| High jump | Mieke van Doorn (NED) | 1.74 m | Svetlana Gontkovskaya (URS) | 1.74 m | Renate Gärtner (FRG) | 1.74 m |
| Long jump | Jarmila Nygrýnová (TCH) | 6.27 m | Moira Walls (GBR) | 6.26 m | Brigitte Göhrs (FRG) | 6.03 m |
| Shot put | Gabriele Moritz (GDR) | 16.91 m | Birgit Palzkill (FRG) | 16.56 m | Margitta Ludewig (GDR) | 15.98 m |
| Discus throw | Klara Pogyor (HUN) | 48.26 m | Maria Illi (ROM) | 47.76 m | Irina Sapronova (URS) | 47.50 m |
| Javelin throw | Jacqueline Todten (GDR) | 55.20 m | Christine Schmidt (GDR) | 53.08 m | Inara Oshinya (URS) | 52.36 m |
| Pentathlon | Monika Peikert (GDR) | 4578 pts | Irena Vitane (URS) | 4482 pts | Florence Picaut (FRA) | 4422 pts |

== Medal table ==
| Rank | Nation | Gold | Silver | Bronze | Total |
|---|---|---|---|---|---|
| 1 | East Germany | 10 | 4 | 7 | 21 |
| 2 | Soviet Union | 7 | 7 | 9 | 23 |
| 3 | Poland | 4 | 3 | 1 | 8 |
| 4 | West Germany | 3 | 8 | 5 | 16 |
| 5 | Great Britain | 3 | 4 | 1 | 8 |
| 6 | Czechoslovakia | 2 | 0 | 1 | 3 |
| 7 | France | 1 | 6 | 3 | 10 |
| 8 | Finland | 1 | 1 | 0 | 2 |
| 9 | Hungary | 1 | 0 | 4 | 5 |
| 10 | Netherlands | 1 | 0 | 1 | 2 |
| 11 | Belgium | 1 | 0 | 0 | 1 |
| 11 | Bulgaria | 1 | 0 | 0 | 1 |
| 13 | Romania | 0 | 2 | 0 | 2 |
| 14 | Spain | 0 | 0 | 1 | 1 |
| 14 | Sweden | 0 | 0 | 1 | 1 |
| 14 | Yugoslavia | 0 | 0 | 1 | 1 |
| Totals (16 entries) | | 35 | 35 | 35 | 105 |

== Significant participating athletes ==
According to the publication Athletics International who published the list below, it is interesting to underline some of the most significant names who competed in Paris Colombes, most of whom did not immediately make their best result but who definitely achieved distinction in the years afterwards:

- Pietro Mennea ITA: 5th in 200m (22.3), set world record of 19.72A in 1979 and won 1980 Olympic title.
- Fernando Mamede POR: 5th in 800m heat (1:56.3), set world 10,000m record of 27:13.81 in 1984.
- Thomas Wessinghage GER: 8th in 1500m (3:57.5), 1982 European 5000m champion.
- Bronislaw Malinowski POL: 1st in 2000mSC (5:44.0), 1980 Olympic 3000mSC champion; pb 8:09.11 in 1976.
- Jürgen Straub GDR: 6th in 2000mSC heat (5:55.6), 2nd 1980 Olympic 1500m.
- Aleksey Spiridonov URS: 2nd in HT (64.88m), set world record of 78.62m in 1976 and 2nd in that year's Olympics.
- Karl-Hans Riehm FRG: 4th in HT (64.22m), set world records of 78.50 in 1975 and 80.32 in 1978; 2nd 1984 Olympics.
- Aleksandr Makarov URS: 2nd in JT (74.92m), 2nd 1980 Olympics with pb of 89.64 (old model).
- Ferenc Paragi HUN: 8th in JT (65.14), set world record of 96.72 (old model) in 1980.
- Aleksandr Grebenyuk URS: 7th in Dec (6404 points), European champion in 1978; pb of 8400 in 1977.
- Monika Zehrt GDR: 1st in 400m (54.0), Won 1972 Olympic title and set world record of 51.0 that year.
- Grażyna Rabsztyn POL: 1st in 100mH (13.9), set world records of 12.48 in 1978 and 12.36 in 1980.
- Sara Simeoni ITA: 5th in HJ (1.70m), 1980 Olympic champion and set world record of 2.01m twice in 1978.
- Jacqueline Todten GDR: 1st in JT (55.20m), 2nd 1972 Olympics; pb of 63.14m (old model) in 1973.
- Eva Wilms FRG: 5th in Pen (4315 points), 4641 indoors in 1977; 2nd European Indoor SP in 1980; pb of 21.43 in 1977.
