= Mike McRae =

Mike McRae may refer to:

- Mike McRae (long jumper)
- Mike McRae (baseball)

== See also ==
- Mike MacRae, American actor and comedian
