= Athletics at the 1985 Summer Universiade – Men's long jump =

The men's long jump event at the 1985 Summer Universiade was held at the Kobe Universiade Memorial Stadium in Kobe on 30 and 31 August 1985.<ref

== Medalists ==
Gold	Silver	Bronze
Jaime Jefferson; Cuba	Robert Emmiyan; Soviet Union	Stanisław Jaskułka; Poland

== Results ==
=== Qualification ===
Rank	Group	Athlete	Nationality	Result	Notes
1	?	Robert Emmiyan	Soviet Union	7.91	
1	?	Jaime Jefferson	Cuba	7.91	
3	?	Ubaldo Duany	Cuba	7.87	
4	?	Pang Yan	China	7.84	
5	?	Stanisław Jaskułka	Poland	7.81	
6	?	Elmer Williams	Puerto Rico	7.77	
7	?	Nobiyuki Ito	Japan	7.76	
8	?	Paul Emordi	Nigeria	7.75	
9	?	Zsolt Szabó	Hungary	7.74	
10	?	Derrick Brown	Great Britain	7.73	
11	?	Sergey Zaozerskiy	Soviet Union	7.69	
12	?	Koji Umemoto	Japan	7.68	
13	?	Edrick Floréal	Canada	7.66	
14	?	Keith Talley	United States	7.62	
15	?	Giancarlo Biscarini	Italy	7.59	
16	?	Chen Zunrong	China	7.57	
17	?	Gyula Pálóczi	Hungary	7.56	
18	?	Kim Jong-Il	South Korea	7.39	
19	?	Dave Coney	United States	7.38	
20	?	René Mangold	Switzerland	7.34	
21	?	Grégoire Ulrich	Switzerland	7.33	
22	?	Moses Kiayi	Kenya	7.28	
23	?	Simon Shirley	Australia	7.16	
24	?	Nasir Hussain Jassim	Iraq	7.06	
25	?	Mauricio Carranza	El Salvador	6.89	
26	?	Richard Duval	Mauritius	6.70	
27	?	S. Maingi	Kenya	6.52	
28	?	W. Fahs	Lebanon	5.68	

=== Final ===
Rank	Athlete	Nationality	Result	Notes
1st place, gold medalist(s)	Jaime Jefferson	Cuba	8.07	
2nd place, silver medalist(s)	Robert Emmiyan	Soviet Union	8.03	
3rd place, bronze medalist(s)	Stanisław Jaskułka	Poland	7.99 (w)	
4	Elmer Williams	Puerto Rico	7.83	
5	Sergey Zaozerskiy	Soviet Union	7.82	
6	Derrick Brown	Great Britain	7.82	
7	Ubaldo Duany	Cuba	7.80	
8	Zsolt Szabó	Hungary	7.79	
9	Nobiyuki Ito	Japan	7.60	
10	Koji Umemoto	Japan	7.54	
11	Paul Emordi	Nigeria	7.48	
12	Pang Yan	China	7.42	
