= Antonio Corgos =

Spanish long jumper (born 1960)

Medal record

Men's athletics

Representing Spain

European Championships
Silver medal – second place	1982 Athens	Long jump

European Indoor Championships
Silver medal – second place	1981 Grenoble	Long jump

Antonio Corgos Cervantes (born 10 March 1960 in Barcelona, Catalonia) is a retired long jumper from Spain. He won two silver medals at the European Athletics Indoor Championships as well as one at the 1982 European Athletics Championships. He was also a silver medallist at the 1983 Mediterranean Games and the 1983 Ibero-American Championships in Athletics. Corgos was an Olympic finalist on three occasions, his best result being fifth at the 1988 Seoul Olympics.

He set personal bests of 8.23 m (27 ft 0 in) in the long jump and 16.33 m (53 ft 6 3/4 in) in the triple jump (indoors).

== International competitions ==
Year	Competition	Venue	Position	Event	Notes
Representing Spain
1980	European Indoor Championships	Sindelfingen, West Germany	15th	Triple jump	15.46 m
1980	Olympic Games	Moscow, Soviet Union	7th	Long jump	8.09 m (+0.2 m/s)
1981	European Indoor Championships	Grenoble, France	2nd	Long jump	7.97 m
1982	European Indoor Championships	Milan, Italy	10th	Long jump	7.48 m
1982	European Championships	Athens, Greece	2nd	Long jump	8.19 m (+0.4 m/s)
1983	World Championships	Helsinki, Finland	7th	Long jump	8.06 m (+0.3 m/s)
1983	Mediterranean Games	Casablanca, Morocco	2nd	Long jump	7.75 m
1983	Ibero-American Championships	Barcelona, Spain	2nd	Long jump	7.90 m (+0.4 m/s)
1984	Olympic Games	Los Angeles, United States	10th	Long jump	7.69 m (-1.1 m/s)
1985	European Indoor Championships	Piraeus, Greece	6th	Long jump	7.94 m
1986	European Indoor Championships	Madrid, Spain	4th	Long jump	8.12 m
1988	European Indoor Championships	Budapest, Hungary	10th	Long jump	7.64 m
1988	Ibero-American Championships	Mexico City, Mexico	3rd	Long jump	8.08 m (0.0 m/s) A
1988	Olympic Games	Seoul, South Korea	5th	Long jump	8.03 m (+0.5 m/s)
1989	European Indoor Championships	The Hague, Netherlands	2nd	Long jump	8.12 m
1989	World Cup	Barcelona, Spain	7th	Long jump	7.06 m
1990	European Indoor Championships	Glasgow, United Kingdom	11th	Long jump	7.70 m
1992	Ibero-American Championships	Seville, Spain	6th	Long jump	7.69 m w (+2.8 m/s)
