= 1978 European Athletics Indoor Championships – Men's long jump =

The men's long jump event at the 1978 European Athletics Indoor Championships was held on 12 March in Milan.

== Results ==
Rank	Name	Nationality	#1	#2	#3	#4	#5	#6	Result	Notes
1st place, gold medalist(s)	László Szálma	Hungary	7.63	7.71	7.68	7.83	7.47	7.81	7.83	
2nd place, silver medalist(s)	Ronald Desruelles	Belgium							7.75	
3rd place, bronze medalist(s)	Vladimir Tsepelyov	Soviet Union							7.73	
4	Carlo Arrighi	Italy							7.71	
5	Åke Fransson	Sweden							7.68	
6	Gilbert Zante	France							7.64	
7	Ulf Jarfelt	Sweden							7.64	
8	Jens Knipphals	West Germany							7.35	
