= Carlo Arrighi =

Italian long jumper

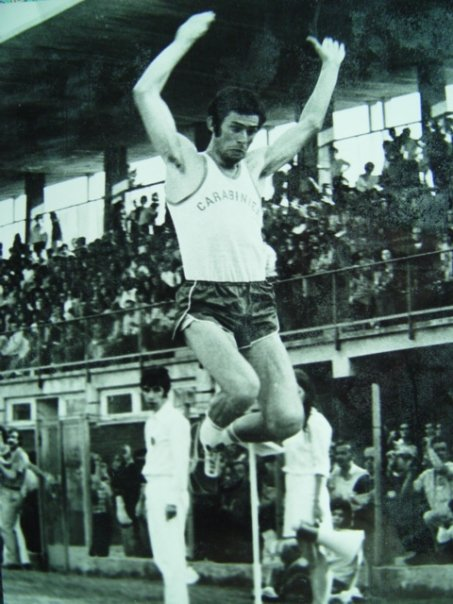
- Arrighi at the Palio della Quercia in 1970s.

Personal information
- National team: Italy: 38 caps (1968–1979)
- Born: 24 September 1947 Carrara, Italy

Sport
- Country: Italy
- Sport: Athletics
- Event: Long jump
- Club: C.S. Carabinieri

Achievements and titles
- Personal best: Long jump: 7.87 m (1972)

Carlo Arrighi (24 September 1947) is an Italian long jumper who was a three-time finalist at the European Championships.

== Career ==
His personal best, 7.87m set in 1972 was the 30th best result in the year world top-lists.

== Achievements ==
| Year | Competition | Venue | Rank | Event | Measure | Notes |
|---|---|---|---|---|---|---|
| 1970 | European Indoor Championships | Vienna | 12th | Long jump | 7.45 m | |
| 1977 | European Indoor Championships | San Sebastián | 6th | Long jump | 7.61 m | |
| 1978 | European Indoor Championships | Milan | 4th | Long jump | 7.71 m | |

== National titles ==
Arrighi won four national championships at individual senior level.

- Italian Athletics Indoor Championships
  - Long jump: 1971, 1973, 1977, 1978 (4)
