= Ghabi Issa Khouri =

Lebanese long jumper (born 1960)

Personal information
- Nationality: Lebanese
- Born: 17 September 1960 (age 65)

Sport
- Sport: Athletics
- Event: Long jump

Ghabi Issa Khouri (born 17 September 1960) is a Lebanese athlete. He competed in the men's long jump at the 1984 Summer Olympics.
