= Ronald Raborg =

Peruvian long jumper

Personal information
- Full name: Ronald Augusto Raborg Pfennig
- Nationality: Peruvian
- Born: 6 November 1957 (age 68)
- Occupation: Architect
- Height: 1.76 m (5 ft 9 in)
- Children: Luciano, Julieta, Katicsa and Margaret Raborg

Sport
- Sport: Athletics

Ronald Raborg (born 6 November 1957) is a Peruvian former athlete. He competed in the men's long jump at the 1980 Summer Olympics.

His personal best in the long jump is 7.39 metres set in 1984.

== International competitions ==
Year	Competition	Venue	Position	Event	Notes
Representing Peru
1974	South American Junior Championships	Lima, Peru	8th	Long jump	6.47 m
1974	South American Junior Championships	Lima, Peru	7th	Triple jump	13.47 m
1975	South American Championships	Rio de Janeiro, Brazil	5th	Long jump	7.04 m
1977	Bolivarian Games	La Paz, Bolivia	2nd	Long jump	7.17 m
1977	Bolivarian Games	La Paz, Bolivia	3rd	Triple jump	14.64 m
1977	South American Championships	Montevideo, Uruguay	3rd	Long jump	7.22 m
1978	Southern Cross Games	La Paz, Bolivia	3rd	Long jump	7.25 m
1979	Universiade	Mexico City, Mexico	18th (q)	Long jump	7.17 m
1979	South American Championships	Bucaramanga, Colombia	6th	Long jump	7.12 m
1980	Olympic Games	Moscow, Soviet Union	28th (q)	Long jump	6.85 m
1981	South American Championships	La Paz, Bolivia	3rd	4 × 100 m relay	40.8 s
1981	South American Championships	La Paz, Bolivia	4th	Long jump	7.14 m
1982	Southern Cross Games	Santa Fe, Argentina	6th	100 m	11.21 s
1982	Southern Cross Games	Santa Fe, Argentina	2nd	4 × 100 m relay	43.00 s
1982	Southern Cross Games	Santa Fe, Argentina	5th	Long jump	6.79 m
1983	South American Championships	Santa Fe, Argentina	10th	100 m	11.2 s
1983	South American Championships	Santa Fe, Argentina	5th	4 × 100 m relay	44.6 s
1983	South American Championships	Santa Fe, Argentina	6th	4 × 400 m relay	3:31.4
1983	South American Championships	Santa Fe, Argentina	9th	Long jump	6.62 m
1985	Universiade	Kobe, Japan	30th (qf)	100 m	11.47 s
