= Claude Morinière =

French long jumper

Claude Morinière (born 10 January 1960) is a retired French long jumper.

His personal best jump was 8.00 metres, achieved in May 1986 in Lisbon.

== International competitions ==
Year	Competition	Venue	Position	Notes
Representing France
1981	European Indoor Championships	Grenoble, France	9th	7.57 m
1985	European Indoor Championships	Piraeus, Greece	8th	7.86 m
1986	European Championships	Stuttgart, West Germany	9th	7.51 m
1988	European Indoor Championships	Budapest, Hungary	11th	7.61 m
