= Vladimir Tsepelyov =

Soviet long jumper

Medal record

Men's athletics

Representing Soviet Union

European Championships
Bronze medal – third place	1978 Prague	Long jump

European Indoor Championships
Gold medal – first place	1979 Vienna	Long jump
Bronze medal – third place	1978 Milan	Long jump

Vladimir Tsepelyov (born 10 October 1956) is a retired long jumper who represented the USSR. He won two medals at the European Indoor Championships as well as a bronze medal at the 1978 European Championships in Athletics.
