= Hans-Jürgen Berger =

German long jumper

Personal information
- Born: 21 September 1951 (age 74) Remscheid, West Germany

Sport
- Sport: Track and field
Medal record
Representing West Germany
European Indoor Championships
Silver medal – second place	1975 Katowice	Long jump

Hans-Jürgen Berger (born 21 September 1951) is a German former long jumper who competed in the 1976 Summer Olympics.
