= Kristján Harðarson =

Icelandic long jumper

Personal information
- Nationality: Icelandic
- Born: 28 July 1964 (age 61)

Sport
- Sport: Athletics
- Event: Long jump

Kristján Harðarson (born 28 July 1964) is an Icelandic former athlete. He competed in the men's long jump at the 1984 Summer Olympics.
