= Viktor Belskiy =

Belarusian long jumper (1955–2021)

Personal information
- Full name: Viktor Mikhaylovich Belskiy
- Nationality: Belarusian
- Born: 22 February 1955 Minsk, Byelorussian SSR
- Died: 18 May 2021 (aged 66)

Sport
- Sport: Athletics
- Event: Long jump
- Club: Trudovye Rezervy Minsk

Viktor Belskiy (22 February 1955 – 18 May 2021) was a Belarusian long jumper who represented the Soviet Union.

He finished fifth at the 1980 European Indoor Championships and sixth at the 1980 Summer Olympics, He also competed at the 1979 Summer Universiade without reaching the final. His personal best jump was 8.20 metres, achieved in 1982.
