= Alberto Albero =

Italian long jumper

Personal information
- National team: Italy: 4 caps (1971-1976)
- Born: 4 February 1952 (age 74) Pisa, Italy

Sport
- Sport: Athletics
- Event: Long jump
- Club: Atletica Cus Pisa (1972-1974); Carabinieri Bologna (1975-1976)
- Retired: 1976

Achievements and titles
- Personal best: Long jump: 7.84 m indoor(1976)

Alberto Albero (born 4 February 1952) is a former Italian long jumper who was 6th at the 1976 European Indoor Championships.

== Career ==
Shortly after doing the minimum to participate in the 1976 Montreal Olympic Games he had to retire athletics due to tendon problems at the age of 24, at his full potential.

== National records ==
- Long jump indoor: 7.84 m ( (Italy) Milan, 10 February 1976) - record holder until 10 March 1982.

== Achievements ==
Year	Competition	Venue	Rank	Event	Time	Notes
1976	European Indoor Championships	(West Germany) Munich	6th	Long jump	7.60 m	

== National titles ==
Albero won three national championships at individual senior level.

- Italian Athletics Indoor Championships
  - Long jump: 1972, 1975, 1976 (3)
