= Stelio Craveirinha =

Mozambican long jumper (1950–2020)

Personal information
- Nationality: Mozambican
- Born: 3 March 1950
- Died: 11 October 2020 (aged 70)

Sport
- Sport: Athletics
- Event: Long jump

Stélio Newton Craveirinha (3 March 1950 – 11 October 2020) was a Mozambican athlete. He competed in the men's long jump at the 1980 Summer Olympics.
