= Mohamed Abdulla Abdelaslam =

Libyan long jumper (born 1954)

Mohamed Abdulla Abdelaslam (born 1954) is a Libyan retired long jumper.

He finished fourth at the 1983 Mediterranean Games and competed at the 1983 World Championships without reaching the final.
