= Wang Shijie (athlete) =

Chinese long jumper

Personal information
- Nationality: Chinese
- Born: 10 November 1963 (age 62)

Sport
- Sport: Athletics
- Event: Long jump
Medal record
Men's athletics
Representing China
Asian Championships
Bronze medal – third place	1987 Singapore	Long jump

Wang Shijie (born 10 November 1963) is a Chinese athlete. He competed in the men's long jump at the 1984 Summer Olympics.
