= Maurizio Maffi =

Italian former long jumper

Personal information
- National team: Italy: 3 (1978)
- Born: 8 May 1956 (age 70) Palazzolo sull'Oglio, Italy

Sport
- Sport: Athletics
- Event: Long jump
- Club: Snia Milano

Achievements and titles
- Personal best: Long jump: 7.69 m (1978)

Maurizio Maffi (born 8 May 1956) is a former Italian long jumper.

== Career ==
Two-time national champion at senior level in long jump in 1978 and 1980.

== Achievements ==
Year	Competition	Venue	Rank	Event	Measure	Notes
1978	European Championships	(Czechoslovakia) Prague	Qual.	Long jump	7.42 m	
