= Stanisław Jaskułka =

Polish long jumper

Personal information
- Born: 25 August 1958 (age 68) Puck, Poland

Sport
- Sport: Track and field
Medal record
Representing Poland
European Indoor Championships
Bronze medal – third place	1980 Sindelfingen	Long jump
European Junior Championships
Gold medal – first place	1977 Donetsk	Long jump
Summer Universiade
Bronze medal – third place	1985 Kobe	Long jump

Stanisław Jaskułka (born 25 August 1958) is a retired Polish long jumper.

He was born in Puck, and represented the sports club AZS Warszawa. He won the gold medal at the 1977 European Junior Championships. He finished fourth at the 1977 European Indoor Championships, and fifth at the 1980 Olympic Games.

He won the bronze medal at the 1980 European Indoor Championships, promoted from fourth place after winner Ronald Desruelles was disqualified for doping. Another bronze medal followed at the 1985 Summer Universiade. He finished fifth at the 1986 European Championships. Participating at the 1987 World Championships, he recorded no valid mark.

He became Polish champion in 1980, 1981 1982, 1984 and 1986, and Polish indoor champion in 1977, 1979, 1981, 1985 and 1989.

His personal best jump was 8.13 metres, achieved at the 1980 Olympic Games.

== International competitions ==
Year	Competition	Venue	Position	Event	Notes
Representing Poland
1975	European Junior Championships	Athens, Greece	9th	Long jump	7.70 m
1977	European Indoor Championships	San Sebastián, Spain	4th	Long jump	7.68 m
1977	European Junior Championships	Donetsk, Soviet Union	1st	Long jump	7.77 m
1978	European Championships	Prague, Czechoslovakia	10th	Long jump	7.60 m
1979	Universiade	Mexico City, Mexico	8th	Long jump	7.58 m
1980	European Indoor Championships	Sindelfingen, West Germany	3rd	Long jump	7.85 m
1980	Olympic Games	Moscow, Soviet Union	5th	Long jump	8.13 m
1981	Universiade	Bucharest, Romania	8th	Long jump	7.74 m
1982	European Championships	Athens, Greece	15th (q)	Long jump	7.74 m
1984	Friendship Games	Moscow, Soviet Union	–	Long jump	NM
1985	Universiade	Kobe, Japan	3rd	Long jump	7.99 m (w)
1986	European Championships	Gothenburg, Sweden	5th	Long jump	7.85 m
1987	World Championships	Rome, Italy	–	Long jump	NM
