= Doudou N'Diaye =

Senegalese athlete

Personal information
- Nationality: Senegalese
- Born: 17 January 1951 (age 75)

Sport
- Sport: Athletics
- Event: Long jump

Amadou "Doudou" N'Diaye (born 17 January 1951) is a Senegalese athlete. He competed in the men's long jump at the 1980 Summer Olympics.
