= Jochen Verschl =

German long jumper

Jochen Verschl (born 18 June 1956) is a retired West German long jumper.

A promising athlete as a junior, Verschl won silver medals at both the 1973 and 1975 European Junior Championships. He became West German champion in 1977 and 1978, representing the sports club VfB Stuttgart.

His personal best jump was 8.04 metres, achieved in June 1979 in Fürth.
