= Zbigniew Beta =

Polish long jumper

Personal information
- Born: 2 July 1953 (age 72) Warsaw, Poland

Sport
- Sport: Track and field
Medal record
Representing Poland
European Indoor Championships
Bronze medal – third place	1975 Katowice	Long jump

Zbigniew Beta (born 2 July 1953) is a retired Polish long jumper.

He won the bronze medal at the 1975 European Indoor Championships. He became Polish champion in 1973, and Polish indoor champion in 1975.

His personal best jump was 7.77 metres, achieved in May 1974 in Warsaw. He had 7.82 metres on the indoor track, achieved in March 1975 in Katowice.
