= Llewellyn Starks =

American long jumper

Personal information
- Born: February 10, 1967 (age 59) Jonesboro, Louisiana, United States

Sport
- Sport: Track and field
Medal record
Representing United States
Pan American Games
| Silver medal – second place | 1991 Havana | Long jump |
Summer Universiade
| Bronze medal – third place | 1989 Duisburg | Long jump |

Llewellyn Starks (born February 10, 1967) is a retired male long jumper who competed for the United States in the 1980s and early 1990s. He was a silver medalist at the Pan American Games in 1991, and a bronze medalist at the US National Championships in 1989 and 1990. He set his personal best of 8.50 metres on July 7, 1991 at a meet in Rhede, Germany. Starks' career came to a shocking end when he suffered a compound fracture to his right leg during a jump at the 1992 New York Games.

Starks won the long jump event at the 1990 NCAA Outdoor Track and Field Championship, setting a school record of 8.24 m for the Louisiana State University Tigers.

Starks is a 1985 graduate of Jonesboro-Hodge High School in Jonesboro, Louisiana. He was also a member of the Louisiana State University track and field team. He had earlier competed for the Northwestern State Demons track and field team.

Starks was coached by Dan Pfaff, who also coached Donovan Bailey and Obadele Thompson among others.

== Achievements ==
| Year | Competition | Venue | Position | Notes |
|---|---|---|---|---|
| 1988 | US National Championships | Tampa, Florida | 6th | 7.90 m |
| 1989 | US National Championships | Houston, Texas | 3rd | 8.48 m |
| 1990 | US National Championships | Norwalk, California | 3rd | 8.09 m |
| 1991 | US National Championships | New York City | 4th | 8.34 m |
| 1991 | Pan American Games | Havana, Cuba | 2nd | 8.01 m |
