= Atanas Atanasov (long jumper) =

Bulgarian long jumper (born 1956)

Personal information
- Full name: Atanas Zapryanov Atanasov
- Born: 7 October 1956 (age 69)

Atanas Zapryanov Atanasov (Bulgarian: Атанас Атанасов; born 7 October 1956) is a retired Bulgarian long jumper.

He won the 1981, 1984 and 1985 Balkan Championships. He finished eighth at the 1982 European Championships, twelfth at the 1983 World Championships, seventh at the 1985 European Indoor Championships, and seventh at the 1986 Goodwill Games.

He became Bulgarian champion in 1990. Domestic rivals were Ivan Tuparov, Atanas Chochev, Vladimir Amidzhinov and Daniel Ivanov. His personal best jump was 8.31 metres, achieved in July 1984 in Sofia.

He has later coached long jumpers such as Nikolay Atanasov (no relation) and Antonia Yordanova.
