= Jaime Jefferson =

Cuban long jumper

Personal information
- Born: January 17, 1962 (age 64) Guantanamo, Cuba
Medal record
Men's Athletics
Representing Cuba
World Athletics Indoor Championships
Silver medal – second place	1991 Seville	Long jump
Bronze medal – third place	1993 Toronto	Long jump
Summer Universiade
Gold medal – first place	1985 Kobe	Long jump
Gold medal – first place	1989 Duisburg	Long jump
Pan American Games
Gold medal – first place	1983 Caracas	Long jump
Gold medal – first place	1991 Havana	Long jump
Silver medal – second place	1995 Mar del Plata	Long jump
Bronze medal – third place	1987 Indianapolis	Long jump
Central American and Caribbean Games
Gold medal – first place	1986 Santiago	Long jump
Silver medal – second place	1990 Mexico City	Long jump
Bronze medal – third place	1993 Ponce	Long jump

Jaime Jefferson Guilarte (Spanish pronunciation: [ˈxajme ˈʝefeɾsoŋ ɡiˈlaɾte]; born 17 January 1962) is a retired Cuban long jumper. A predecessor of the greatest Cuban long jumper, Ivan Pedroso, he was also capable of big jumps, taking more international medals in a career that spanned for over a decade.

== Career ==
His first notable success were 1983 Pan-American Games in Caracas where he won the gold. Jefferson improved his long jump personal best to 8.37m in 1984, but was deprived of competing at the L.A. Olympics through Cuban boycott. Over the next decade and a half, he amassed several medals from Central American Games and Championships, winning the golds at Champs in 1985 and CAC Games in 1986. Jaime also won two golds at World University Games - first in Kobe in 1985, second in Duisburg in 1989. At the Pan-American Games in Indianapolis in 1987, he improved his PB to 8.51m to collect bronze medal behind Carl Lewis and Larry Myricks (both USA), but couldn't reproduce that at the World Championships in Rome finishing 6th with 8.14m.

1988 was again frustrating because of another Olympic Cuban boycott, but Jaime continued to compete with even more success in 90's. He recorded his career best long jump of 8.53m in 1990 and had great season in 1991, winning silver at the World Indoor Championships in Seville and reclaiming Pan-American title he lost in 1987, winning in his home country in Havana with 8.26m. Only disappointment of the season was subpar 9th-place finish in the greatest long jump competition ever, World Championships in Tokyo. Next season finally brought Jefferson's first Olympic appearance and he finished creditable 5th in Barcelona, again behind great Carl Lewis. Jaime added World Indoor bronze in 1993 at Toronto, but his career was obviously on the wane in his thirties as he was unable to qualify for the final in major outings 1993 and 1995 World Championships and 1996 Olympic Games in Atlanta.

Jaime Jefferson won his final international medal at 1997 CAC Championships in San Juan where he finished behind his famous compatriot Ivan Pedroso, by then World's finest long jumper, and retired at the end of the season.

== International competitions ==
Year	Competition	Venue	Position	Event	Notes
Representing Cuba
1983	Central American and Caribbean Championships	Havana, Cuba	3rd	Long jump	8.03 m
1983	Pan American Games	Caracas, Venezuela	1st	Long jump	8.03 m
1983	Ibero-American Championships	Barcelona, Spain	1st	Long jump	7.93 m
1985	Central American and Caribbean Championships	Nassau, Bahamas	1st	Long jump	8.13 m
1985	Universiade	Kobe, Japan	1st	Long jump	8.07 m
1986	Central American and Caribbean Games	Santiago, Dominican Republic	1st	Long jump	8.34 m
1987	World Indoor Championships	Indianapolis, United States	10th	Long jump	7.78 m
1987	Pan American Games	Indianapolis, United States	3rd	Long jump	8.51 m
1987	World Championships	Rome, Italy	6th	Long jump	8.14 m
1988	Ibero-American Championships	Mexico City, Mexico	1st	Long jump	8.37 m
1989	World Indoor Championships	Budapest, Hungary	5th	Long jump	7.96 m
1989	Central American and Caribbean Championships	San Juan, Puerto Rico	2nd	4 × 100 m relay	39.89 s
1989	Central American and Caribbean Championships	San Juan, Puerto Rico	1st	Long jump	7.96 m
1989	Universiade	Duisburg, West Germany	1st	Long jump	7.98 m
1989	World Cup	Barcelona, Spain	8th	Long jump	6.52 m^{1}
1990	Goodwill Games	Seattle, United States	6th	Long jump	7.98 m
1990	Central American and Caribbean Games	Mexico City, Mexico	2nd	Long jump	8.06 m
1991	World Indoor Championships	Seville, Spain	2nd	Long jump	8.04 m
1991	Pan American Games	Havana, Cuba	1st	Long jump	8.26 m
1991	World Championships	Tokyo, Japan	9th	Long jump	7.94 m
1992	Olympic Games	Barcelona, Spain	5th	Long jump	8.08 m
1993	World Indoor Championships	Toronto, Canada	3rd	Long jump	7.98 m
1993	World Championships	Stuttgart, Germany	15th (q)	Long jump	7.86 m
1993	Central American and Caribbean Games	Ponce, Puerto Rico	3rd	Long jump	7.85 m
1994	Ibero-American Championships	Mar del Plata, Argentina	1st	Long jump	7.82 m (w)
1995	Pan American Games	Mar del Plata, Argentina	2nd	Long jump	8.23 m
1995	World Championships	Gothenburg, Sweden	21st (q)	Long jump	7.84 m
1996	Ibero-American Championships	Medellín, Colombia	2nd	Long jump	8.28 m (w)
1996	Olympic Games	Atlanta, United States	31st (q)	Long jump	7.65 m
1997	Central American and Caribbean Championships	San Juan, Puerto Rico	2nd	Long jump	8.01 m (w)

^{1}Representing the Americas
