= Andrzej Klimaszewski (long jumper) =

Polish long jumper

Personal information
- Born: 14 May 1960 (age 66) Ełk, Poland

Sport
- Sport: Track and field

Andrzej Klimaszewski (born 14 May 1960) is a retired Polish long jumper.

He was born in Ełk, and represented the sports club Bałtyk Gdynia. He won the gold medal at the 1979 European Junior Championships. He finished seventh at the 1980 European Indoor Championships, fifth at the 1983 European Indoor Championships, and eleventh at the 1986 European Championships. He also competed at the 1980 Olympic Games without reaching the final.

He became Polish champion in 1985 and 1987, and Polish indoor champion in 1980, 1983, 1984 and 1987.

His personal best jump was 8.20 metres, achieved in July 1980 in Sopot.
