= Ubaldo Duany =

Cuban long jumper (born 1960)

Personal information
- Full name: Ubaldo Duany Lebeque
- Born: 16 May 1960 (age 66)

Sport
- Sport: Athletics
- Event: Long jump
Medal record
Representing Cuba
Central American and Caribbean Games
Bronze medal – third place	1986 Santiago	Long jump
Summer Universiade
Bronze medal – third place	1981 Bucharest	Long jump

Ubaldo Duany Lebeque (born 16 May 1960) is a retired Cuban athlete who specialised in the long jump. He won a bronze medal at the 1981 Summer Universiade. In addition, he represented his country at the 1989 World Indoor Championships and the Americas at two consecutive World Cups.

Later he became an athletics coach coaching, among others, the Colombian triple jump World and Olympic champion, Catherine Ibargüen.

== International competitions ==
Year	Competition	Venue	Position	Event	Notes
Representing Cuba
1979	Central American and Caribbean Championships	Guadalajara, Mexico	3rd	Long jump	7.30 m
1981	Central American and Caribbean Championships	Santo Domingo, Dominican Republic	1st	Long jump	7.76 m
1981	Universiade	Bucharest, Romania	3rd	Long jump	8.10 m
1981	World Cup	Rome, Italy	9th	Long jump	5.37 m^{1}
1982	Central American and Caribbean Games	Havana, Cuba	4th	Long jump	7.78 m
1985	Central American and Caribbean Championships	Nassau, Bahamas	2nd	Long jump	8.07 m
1985	Universiade	Kobe, Japan	7th	Long jump	7.80 m
1985	World Cup	Canberra, Australia	6th	Long jump	7.87 m^{1}
1986	Central American and Caribbean Games	Santiago, Dominican Republic	3rd	Long jump	7.57 m
1987	Central American and Caribbean Championships	Caracas, Venezuela	2nd	Long jump	8.00 m
1988	Ibero-American Championships	Mexico City, Mexico	2nd	Long jump	8.18 m
1989	World Indoor Championships	Budapest, Hungary	7th	Long jump	7.86 m

^{1}Representing the Americas
