= Jörg Klocke =

German long jumper

Jörg Klocke (born 25 January 1960) is a retired West German long jumper.

He finished seventh at the 1980 European Indoor Championships in Sindelfingen. He became West German champion in 1982, representing the sports club TV Wattenscheid.

His personal best jump was 8.09 metres, achieved in July 1982 in München.
