= Yordan Yanev =

Bulgarian long jumper

Yordan Yanev (Bulgarian: Йордан Янев) (born July 29, 1954) is a retired Bulgarian long jumper.

== Achievements ==
Year	Tournament	Venue	Result	Event
1980	Olympic Games	Moscow, Soviet Union	8th	Long jump
1983	European Indoor Championships	Budapest, Hungary	8th	Long jump
