= Roberto Veglia =

Italian long jumper

Personal information
- Nationality: Italian
- Born: 16 April 1957 (age 68) Turin
- Height: 1.83 m (6 ft 0 in)
- Weight: 68 kg (150 lb)

Sport
- Country: Italy
- Sport: Athletics
- Event: Long jump

Roberto Veglia (born 16 April 1957) is a former Italian long jumper who competed at the 1976 Summer Olympics.
