= Jacques Rousseau (athlete) =

French long jumper (1951–2024)

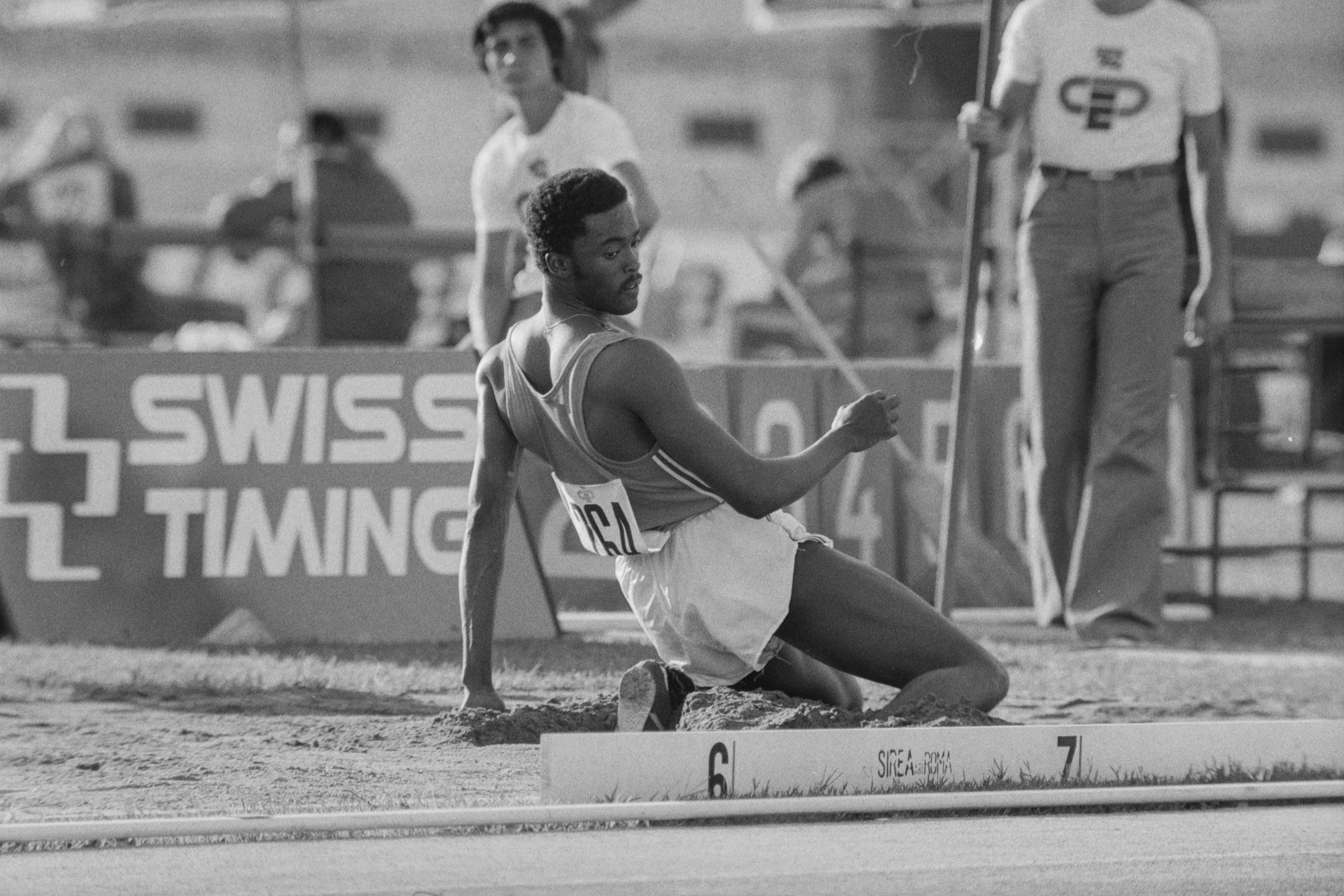
- Rousseau in 1974

Personal information
- Born: 10 March 1951 Saint-Claude, Guadeloupe, France
- Died: 14 February 2024 (aged 72) Saint-Denis, La Reunion, France
- Occupation: Long jumper
Medal record
Men's athletics
Representing France
European Championships
Gold medal – first place	1978 Prague	Long jump
European Indoor Championships
Gold medal – first place	1975 Katowice	Long jump
Gold medal – first place	1976 Munich	Long jump

Jacques Rousseau (10 March 1951 – 14 February 2024) was a French athlete. As of 2006, he resided in Guadeloupe. He died on 14 February 2024, at the age of 72.

== Achievements ==
- Personal best in the long jump: 8.26 meters in 1976 (French record)
- European champion long jumper in 1978
- European indoor long-jump champion in 1975 and 1976
- French champion long jumper in 1975, 1976 and 1977
- French indoor long-jump champion in 1973, 1975 and 1976
- He participated in two Olympics, in 1972 at Munich (tenth) and in 1976 at Montreal (fourth)
- European junior vice-champion of Europe in long jump in 1970
- Selected several times for the junior and senior French teams, he also won a European cup for long jump and 4 by 4 relays. Along with his team, the Racing Club of France, he was French champion of the 4 × 400 m relay.
- A versatile athlete, he also has turned in the following performances:
  - 47.5 in the 400 meters
  - 20.7 in the 200 meters
  - 10.3 in the 100 meters
  - 2 meters in the high jump
