= Yusuf Alli =

Nigerian long jumper (born 1960)

Personal information
- Nationality: Nigerian
- Born: 28 July 1960 (age 65) Lagos, Nigeria
- Occupation: Long jumper
Medal record
Men's athletics
Representing Nigeria
Commonwealth Games
Gold medal – first place	1990 Auckland	Long jump
Summer Universiade
Gold medal – first place	1983 Edmonton	Long jump
African Championships
Gold medal – first place	1988 Annaba	Long jump
Gold medal – first place	1989 Lagos	Long jump
Silver medal – second place	1984 Rabat	Long jump

Yusuf Alli (born 28 July 1960) is a retired Nigerian long jumper, and three-time Olympian. He is best known for his gold medal at the 1990 Commonwealth Games.

His personal best is 8.27 metres, achieved at the 1989 African Championships in Athletics in Lagos, the Nigerian record. He also achieved 8.39 metres at the Commonwealth Games (1990). He jumped in college for the University of Missouri where he still holds the school records for the long jump - both indoor and outdoor (set in 1984 and 1983 respectively).

== Achievements ==
Year	Competition	Venue	Position	Notes
Representing Nigeria
1980	Olympic Games	Moscow, Soviet Union	24th	
1983	Universiade	Edmonton, Canada	1st	
1983	World Championships	Helsinki, Finland	8th	
1984	Olympic Games	Los Angeles, United States	9th	
1984	African Championships	Rabat, Morocco	2nd	
1987	All-Africa Games	Nairobi, Kenya	2nd	
1987	World Championships	Rome, Italy	11th	
1988	Olympic Games	Seoul, South Korea	14th	
1988	African Championships	Annaba, Algeria	1st	
1989	African Championships	Lagos, Nigeria	1st	8.27 m NR
1990	Commonwealth Games	Auckland, New Zealand	1st	
1991	All-Africa Games	Cairo, Egypt	2nd	
