= Jason Grimes =

American long jumper (born 1959)

Personal information
- Born: September 10, 1959 (age 66)
Medal record
Men's athletics
Representing United States
World Championships
Silver medal – second place	1983 Helsinki	Long jump
Summer Universiade
Gold medal – first place	1981 Bucharest	4x100m relay

Jason Grimes (born September 10, 1959) is an American long jumper. Graduate of Overbrook High School in Philadelphia, Pennsylvania. Among his accomplishments, he took a silver medal at the 1983 World Championships in Athletics and was All-American at the University of Tennessee.

Grimes later tried out for the Detroit Lions NFL team despite not having American football experience.
