= Mike McRae (long jumper) =

American long jumper (1955–2023)

Michael Keith McRae (July 9, 1955 – December 16, 2023) was long jumper from the United States who represented his native country at the 1984 Summer Olympics in Los Angeles, California. There he finished in eleventh place. McRae competed for Chabot College in Hayward, California. He was the national champion, winning the TAC Championships at nearby San Jose City College, in 1984. He was born in Pembroke, North Carolina.
