= Valeriy Pidluzhny =

Ukrainian athlete (1952–2021)

Personal information
- Native name: Підлужний Валерій Васильович
- National team: USSR
- Born: 22 August 1952 Stalino, Ukrainian SSR
- Died: 4 October 2021 (aged 69)
- Years active: 1972–1980
Olympic Medal
Men's athletics
Representing Soviet Union
Olympic Games
Bronze medal – third place	1980 Moscow	Long jump
European Championships
Gold medal – first place	1974 Rome	Long jump
European Indoor Championships
Silver medal – second place	1976 Munich	Long jump
Silver medal – second place	1979 Vienna	Long jump
Summer Universiade
Gold medal – first place	1973 Moscow	Long jump
Gold medal – first place	1979 Mexico City	Long jump
- Updated on 14 August 2016

Valeriy Vasylyovych Pidluzhny (Ukrainian: Підлужний Валерій Васильович; 22 August 1952 – 4 October 2021) was a long jumper who represented the Soviet Union. Born in Donetsk, Ukrainian SSR, he trained at the city's Trudovye Rezervy. A three-time Olympian, he won two silver medals at the European Athletics Indoor Championships as well as a gold medal at the 1974 European Athletics Championships and a bronze medal at the 1980 Summer Olympics. His personal best was 8.18 m (26 ft 10 in), set in the 1980 Olympic final in Moscow.

His first international medals of note were three gold medals at the 1970 European Athletics Junior Championships. Senior gold medals followed at the 1973 Summer Universiade and the 1973 European Cup. He achieved his highest international ranking that year, placing third with a best of 8.15 m (26 ft 8 3/4 in).

Pidluzhny won nine national titles in long jump during his career, including five straight wins at the Soviet Athletics Championships from 1973 to 1977 and four titles at the Soviet Indoor Athletics Championships between 1973 and 1980.

== International competitions ==
Year	Competition	Venue	Position	Notes
1970	European Junior Championships	Colombes, France	1st	7.87 m
1971	European Championships	Helsinki, Finland	10th	7.68 m
1972	Olympic Games	Munich, West Germany	9th	7.72 m
1973	Universiade	Moscow, Soviet Union	1st	8.15 m
1973	European Cup	Edinburgh, United Kingdom	1st	8.20 m w
1974	European Indoor Championships	Gothenburg, Sweden	4th	7.97 m
1974	European Championships	Rome, Italy	1st	8.12 m w
1975	European Cup	Nice, France	2nd	7.92 m
1976	European Indoor Championships	Munich, West Germany	2nd	7.79 m
1976	Olympic Games	Montreal, Canada	7th	7.88 m
1977	European Cup	Helsinki, Finland	2nd	7.94 m
1978	European Championships	Prague, Czechoslovakia	6th	7.89 m
1979	European Indoor Championships	Vienna, Austria	2nd	7.86 m
1979	European Cup	Turin, Italy	3rd	7.95 m
1979	Universiade	Mexico City, Mexico	1st	8.16 m
1979	World Cup	Montreal, Canada	4th	7.88 m
1980	Olympic Games	Moscow, Soviet Union	3rd	8.18 m

== National titles ==
- Soviet Athletics Championships
  - Long jump: 1973, 1974, 1975, 1976, 1977
- Soviet Indoor Athletics Championships
  - Long jump: 1973, 1976, 1979, 1980

== See also ==
- Long jump at the Olympics
- List of Olympic medalists in athletics (men)
- List of European Athletics Championships medalists (men)
- List of European Athletics Indoor Championships medalists (men)
