= René Gloor =

Swiss long jumper (born 1956)

René Gloor (born 3 November 1956) is a retired Swiss long jumper.

He finished ninth at the 1982 European Indoor Championships, and ninth at the 1983 European Indoor Championships. He also competed at the 1982 European Championships, the 1983 World Championships, and the 1984 Olympic Games without reaching the final. Gloor also competed in the 4 x 400 metres relay at the 1982 European Championships without reaching the final.

Gloor became Swiss 100 metres champion once, 200 metres champion three times and long jump champion in 1983, 1984, 1985, 1987, 1988 and 1989. He also became indoor long jump champion in 1983, 1985, 1987, 1988 and 1991. His personal best jump was 8.07 metres, achieved in May 1982 in Zofingen. He also had 10.43 seconds in the 100 metres, 20.84 seconds in the 200 metres and 46.55 seconds in the 400 metres.

He became a teacher in Switzerland at Cugy.
