= Atanas Chochev =

Bulgarian athlete

Atanas Chochev (Bulgarian: Атанас Чочев) (born January 17, 1957) is a retired Bulgarian triple jumper and long jumper.

His personal best jump was 8.19 metres, achieved in July 1981 in Sofia. This ranks him seventh among Bulgarian long jumpers, behind Ivaylo Mladenov, Atanas Atanasov, Nikolay Atanasov, Petar Dachev, Nikolay Antonov and Galin Georgiev. In the triple jump he had 16.86 metres from Sofia 1980.

== Achievements ==
Year	Tournament	Venue	Result	Event
1980	European Indoor Championships	Sindelfingen, West Germany	4th	Triple jump
1980	Olympic Games	Moscow, Soviet Union	6th	Triple jump
1981	European Indoor Championships	Grenoble, France	8th	Long jump
1982	European Indoor Championships	Milan, Italy	8th	Long jump
	European Championships	Athens, Greece	7th	Long jump
