= Winfried Klepsch =

German long jumper

Medal record

Men's athletics

Representing West Germany

European Indoor Championships
Gold medal – first place	1980 Sindelfingen	Long jump

Winfried Klepsch (born 22 May 1956) is a retired West German long jumper.

He won the gold medal at the 1980 European Indoor Championships in Sindelfingen.

He won the silver medal at the West German championships in 1978 and 1984, representing the sports club TV Wattenscheid.
