= Ivan Tuparov =

Bulgarian long jumper

Personal information
- Born: 15 November 1959 (age 66) Rakitovo, Bulgaria

Sport
- Sport: Track and field

Ivan Todorov Tuparov (Bulgarian: Иван Тодоров Тупаров, born 15 November 1959) is a retired Bulgarian long jumper.

He was born in Rakitovo. At the 1977 European Junior Championships he won the silver medal in the long jump. He competed at the 1980 Olympic Games without reaching the final. He finished ninth at the 1980 European Indoor Championships, and eighth at the 1981 European Indoor Championships. At the 1982 European Championships he finished twelfth in the long jump final and also eighth in the 4 x 100 metres relay together with Ivaylo Karanyotov, Nikolay Markov and Petar Petrov.

He became Bulgarian champion in 1978, 1980, 1982 and 1984, and Bulgarian indoor champion in 1979, 1980 and 1982.

His personal best jump was 8.07 metres, achieved in June 1984 in Sofia.
