= Joachim Busse =

West German long jumper

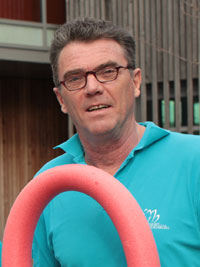
- Joachim Busse

Medal record

Men's athletics

Representing West Germany

European Indoor Championships
Bronze medal – third place	1976 Munich	Long jump

Joachim Busse (born 10 March 1954) is a retired West German long jumper.

He finished sixth at the 1975 European Indoor Championships, won the bronze medal at the 1976 European Indoor Championships, finished fifth at the 1980 European Indoor Championships and also at the 1981 European Indoor Championships .

He became West German champion in 1975, 1981 and 1984, representing the sports clubs Bayer 05 Uerdingen, LG Bayer Leverkusen and ASV Köln.

His personal best jump was 8.12 metres, achieved in July 1981 in Gelsenkirchen.
