= Gyula Pálóczi =

Hungarian long jumper

Personal information
- Born: 13 September 1962 Szamosbecs, Hungary
- Died: 28 January 2009 (aged 46) Budapest, Hungary

Sport
- Sport: Track and field
Medal record
Representing Hungary
World Indoor Championships
Silver medal – second place	1985 Paris	Long jump
European Indoor Championships
Gold medal – first place	1985 Piraeus	Long jump
Silver medal – second place	1983 Budapest	Long jump

Gyula Pálóczi (13 September 1962 – 28 January 2009) was a Hungarian athlete who specialized in the long jump and triple jump. He won two medals at the European Indoor Championships, and due to his versatility the European Athletic Association has called him "the most successful jumper Hungary has ever produced".

== Long jump ==
Pálóczi first made his mark in international athletics at the 1983 European Indoor Championships in Budapest. With a jump of 7.90 metres he won the silver medal, five centimetres behind compatriot László Szalma. Later that year Pálóczi competed at the inaugural World Championships. He leapt 7.70 metres in the qualifying round, which was not enough to reach the final. He missed the 1984 Summer Olympics due to the Soviet-led 1984 Summer Olympics boycott.

In the 1984–85 indoor season, however, Pálóczi won the gold medal at the European Indoor Championships. It was a very tight competition, with Pálóczi being tied by László Szalma but winning on countback; also, he was one centimetre ahead of bronze medalist Sergey Layevskiy and two centimetres ahead of fourth placer Ján Leitner. The mark of 8.15 metres was his personal best indoor result. In the summer of 1985 he leapt a career best of 8.25 metres, achieved in August in Budapest.

Pálóczi later competed at the 1988 European Indoor Championships in Budapest, and this time finished seventh. He became the Hungarian long jump champion in 1984, 1986 and 1990, rivalling with László Szalma and Csaba Almási. He also became Hungarian indoor champion once; in 1985.

== Later career ==
Pálóczi later concentrated on the triple jump. He became the Hungarian triple jump champion in 1988, 1989, 1990, 1993 and 1994; his main rivals were Béla Bakosi, Tibor Ordina and Zsolt Czingler. He also became Hungarian indoor champion in 1989 and 1990. In 1993 he recorded a career best jump of 16.87 metres, achieved in July in Tata. Internationally he competed in the triple jump event at the 1993 World Championships, but with only 15.89 metres he finished near the bottom of the list, and did not reach the final.

Pálóczi also recorded 2.11 metres in the high jump. He stood 1.85 m (6 ft 1 in) tall, and during his active career he weighed 72 kilograms (159 lb). He died in January 2009 at the age of 46.
