= Liu Yuhuang =

Chinese long jumper (born 1959)

Personal information
- Born: 25 July 1959 (age 67) Fujian, China

Sport
- Sport: Track and field
Medal record
Representing China
Asian Games
Silver medal – second place	1982 New Delhi	Long jump
Summer Universiade
Silver medal – second place	1981 Bucharest	Long jump
Asian Championships
Gold medal – first place	1981 Tokyo	Long jump
Gold medal – first place	1983 Kuwait City	Long jump
Gold medal – first place	1985 Jakarta	Long jump
Silver medal – second place	1987 Singapore	Long jump

Liu Yuhuang (simplified Chinese: 刘玉煌; traditional Chinese: 劉玉煌; pinyin: Liú Yùhuáng; born July 25, 1959) is a Chinese retired long jumper, best known for finishing 5th at the 1984 Olympic Games.

== Achievements ==
Year	Competition	Venue	Position	Notes
Representing China
1981	Asian Championships	Tokyo, Japan	1st	8.05m CR
1982	Asian Games	New Delhi, India	2nd	
1983	Asian Championships	Kuwait City, Kuwait	1st	
1984	Olympic Games	Los Angeles, United States	5th	
1985	Asian Championships	Jakarta, Indonesia	1st	
1987	Asian Championships	Singapore	2nd	
