= Dimitrios Delifotis =

Greek long jumper (born 1957)

Personal information
- Born: 20 February 1957 (age 69) Corfu, Greece
Medal record
Men's Athletics
Representing Greece
Mediterranean Games
Gold medal – first place	1983 Casablanca	Long jump

Dimitrios Delifotis (Greek: Δημήτριος Δεληφώτης; born 20 February 1957 in Veria, Imathia) is a retired track and field athlete from Greece, who mainly competed in the men's long jump. He represented his native country at the 1980 Summer Olympics in Moscow, Soviet Union and lives today in Corfu.
