= Rolf Bernhard =

Swiss long jumper

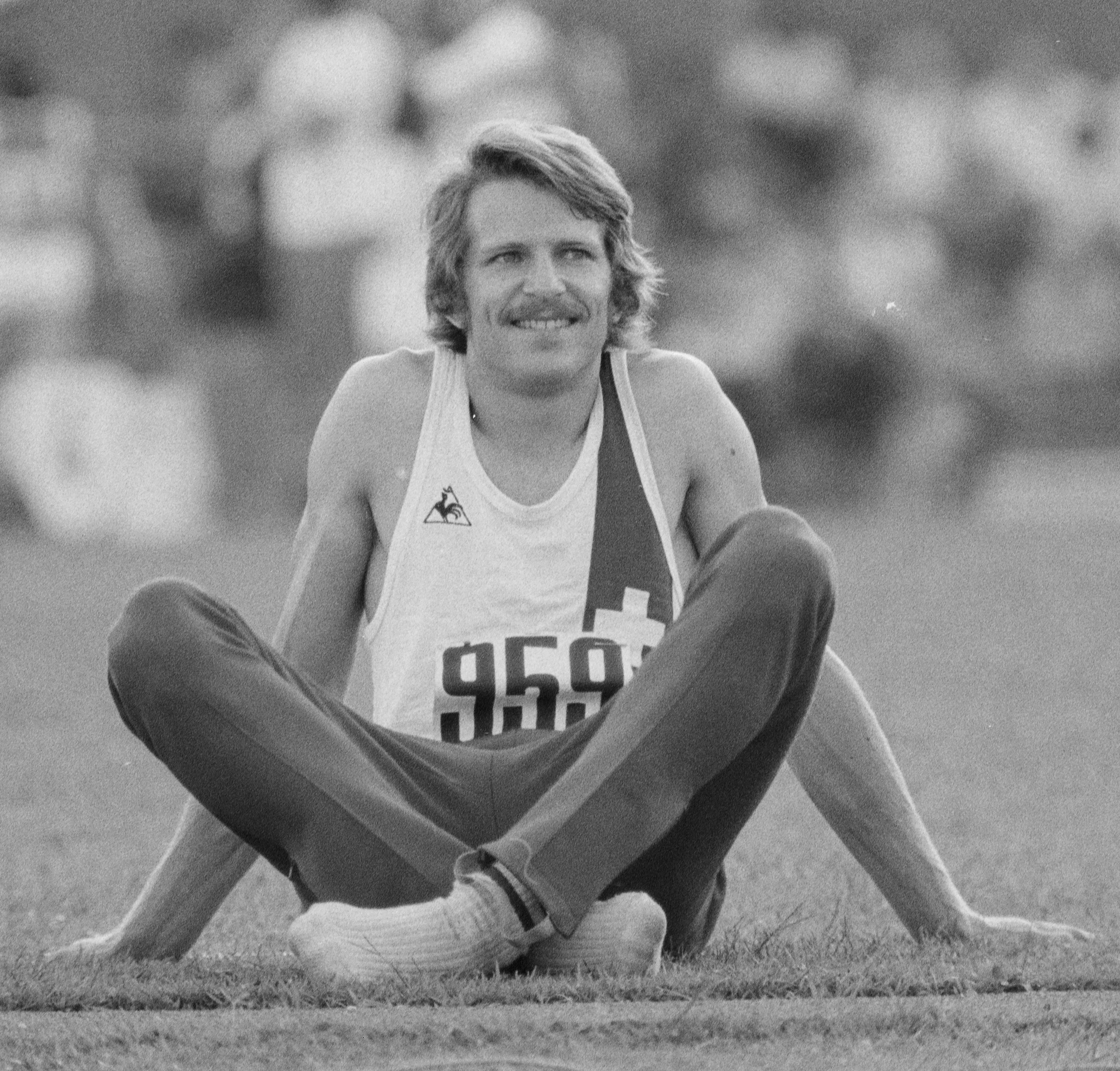
- Bernhard in 1974

Personal information
- Born: 13 December 1949 (age 76) Frauenfeld, Thurgau, Switzerland

Sport
- Country: Switzerland
- Sport: Long jump
Medal record
Men's athletics
Representing Switzerland
European Indoor Championships
Gold medal – first place	1981 Grenoble	Long jump
Silver medal – second place	1982 Milan	Long jump

Rolf Bernhard (born 13 December 1949) is a retired long jumper from Switzerland. A three-time Olympian, he won two medals at the European Indoor Championships. Bernhard competed at the 1972 Summer Olympics, 1976 Summer Olympics, and 1980 Summer Olympics.

== Achievements ==
Year	Competition	Venue	Position	Notes
1972	Olympic Games	Munich, West Germany	16th	
1976	Olympic Games	Montreal, Canada	9th	
1980	Olympic Games	Moscow, Soviet Union	9th	
1981	European Indoor Championships	Grenoble, France	1st	
1982	European Indoor Championships	Milan, Italy	2nd	
1982	European Championships	Athens, Greece	9th	

Awards
Preceded by (Switzerland) Clay Regazzoni	Swiss Sportsman of the Year; 1975	Succeeded by (Switzerland) Heini Hemmi
