= 1980 European Athletics Indoor Championships =

- Dates: 1–2 March 1980
- Host city: Sindelfingen; West Germany
- Venue: Glaspalast
- Events: 19
- Participation: 234 athletes from 26 nations

The 1980 European Athletics Indoor Championships were held in Sindelfingen, a city in West Germany, on 1 and 2 March 1980. The championships were boycotted by East Germany. The middle-distance races were hand-timed.

The host nation topped the medal table with 12 medals, including 5 golds, followed closely by Poland and the Soviet Union.

== Medal summary ==
=== Men ===
Event	Gold		Silver		Bronze	
60 metres	Marian Woronin (POL)	6.62	Christian Haas (FRG)	6.62	Aleksandr Aksinin (URS)	6.63
400 metres	Nikolay Chernetskiy (URS)	46.29	Karel Kolář (TCH)	46.55	Remigijus Valiulis (URS)	46.75
800 metres	Roger Milhau (FRA)	1:50.2a	András Paróczai (HUN)	1:50.3a	Herbert Wursthorn (FRG)	1:50.4a
1500 metres	Thomas Wessinghage (FRG)	3:37.6a CR	Ray Flynn (IRL)	3:38.5a	Pierre Délèze (SUI)	3:38.9a
3000 metres	Karl Fleschen (FRG)	7:57.5a	Klaas Lok (NED)	7:57.9a	Hans-Jürgen Orthmann (FRG)	7:59.9a
60 metres hurdles	Yuriy Chervanyov (URS)	7.54 CR	Romuald Giegiel (POL)	7.73	Javier Moracho (ESP)	7.75
High jump	Dietmar Mögenburg (FRG)	2.31	Jacek Wszoła (POL)	2.29	Adrian Proteasa (ROM)	2.29
Pole vault	Konstantin Volkov (URS)	5.60 CR	Vladimir Polyakov (URS)	5.60	Patrick Abada (FRA)	5.55
Long jump	Winfried Klepsch (FRG)	7.98	Nenad Stekić (YUG)	7.91	Stanisław Jaskułka (POL)	7.85
Triple jump	Béla Bakosi (HUN)	16.86	Jaak Uudmäe (URS)	16.51	Gennadiy Kovtunov (URS)	16.45
Shot put	Zlatan Saracevic (YUG)	20.43	Jaromír Vlk (TCH)	20.19	Ivan Ivančić (YUG)	19.48

=== Women ===
Event	Gold		Silver		Bronze	
60 metres	Sofka Popova (BUL)	7.11	Linda Haglund (SWE)	7.14	Lyudmila Kondratyeva (URS)	7.15
400 metres	Elke Decker (FRG)	52.28	Karoline Käfer (AUT)	52.70	Tatyana Goyshchik (URS)	52.71
800 metres	Jolanta Januchta (POL)	2:00.6a CR	Anne-Marie Van Nuffel (BEL)	2:00.9a	Liz Barnes (GBR)	2:01.5a
1500 metres	Tamara Koba (URS)	4:12.5a	Anna Bukis (POL)	4:13.1a	Mary Purcell (IRL)	4:14.2a
60 metres hurdles	Zofia Bielczyk (POL)	7.77 WR	Grażyna Rabsztyn (POL)	7.89	Natalya Lebedeva (URS)	8.04
High jump	Sara Simeoni (ITA)	1.95 CR	Andrea Mátay (HUN)	1.93	Urszula Kielan (POL)	1.93
Long jump	Anna Włodarczyk (POL)	6.74 CR	Anke Weigt (FRG)	6.68	Sabine Everts (FRG)	6.54
Shot put	Helena Fibingerová (TCH)	19.92	Eva Wilms (FRG)	19.66	Beatrix Philipp (FRG)	17.59

== Medal table ==
Rank	Nation	Gold	Silver	Bronze	Total
1	West Germany (FRG)	5	3	4	12
2	Poland (POL)	4	4	2	10
3	Soviet Union (URS)	4	2	6	12
4	Czechoslovakia (TCH)	1	2	0	3
4	Hungary (HUN)	1	2	0	3
6	Yugoslavia (YUG)	1	1	1	3
7	France (FRA)	1	0	1	2
8	Bulgaria (BUL)	1	0	0	1
8	Italy (ITA)	1	0	0	1
10	Ireland (IRL)	0	1	1	2
11	Austria (AUT)	0	1	0	1
11	Belgium (BEL)	0	1	0	1
11	Netherlands (NED)	0	1	0	1
11	Sweden (SWE)	0	1	0	1
15	Great Britain (GBR)	0	0	1	1
15	Romania (ROU)	0	0	1	1
15	Spain (ESP)	0	0	1	1
15	Switzerland (SUI)	0	0	1	1
Totals (18 entries)		19	19	19	57

== Participating nations ==
- Austria (4)
- Belgium (11)
- Bulgaria (13)
- Cyprus (1)
- Czechoslovakia (9)
- Denmark (1)
- Finland (5)
- France (14)
- Great Britain (4)
- Greece (3)
- Hungary (11)
- Iceland (1)
- Ireland (4)
- Italy (15)
- Netherlands (5)
- Norway (3)
- Poland (21)
- Portugal (1)
- Romania (4)
- Soviet Union (29)
- Spain (10)
- Sweden (6)
- Switzerland (8)
- Turkey (1)
- West Germany (42)
- Yugoslavia (8)
