= Jan Leitner =

Czechoslovak long jumper (born 1953)

Medal record

Men's athletics

Representing Czechoslovakia

European Championships
Bronze medal – third place	1982 Athens	Long jump

Jan Leitner (Czech pronunciation: [ˈjan ˈlajtnɛr]; born 14 September 1953) is a retired long jumper who represented Czechoslovakia.

Leitner was born in Znojmo, Czechoslovakia. His greatest achievements were gold medals at the European Athletics Indoor Championships and IAAF World Indoor Championships in 1984 and 1985. He represented his country at the 1980 Summer Olympics and the 1983 World Championships in Athletics.

== International competitions ==
Year	Competition	Venue	Position	Notes
1980	Olympic Games	Moscow, Soviet Union	18th	
1982	European Championships	Athens, Greece	3rd	
1983	World Championships	Helsinki, Finland	10th	
1984	European Indoor Championships	Gothenburg, Sweden	1st	
1985	World Indoor Championships	Paris, France	1st	
1986	European Indoor Championships	Madrid, Spain	3rd	
