= Group Medal of the Four Day Marches =

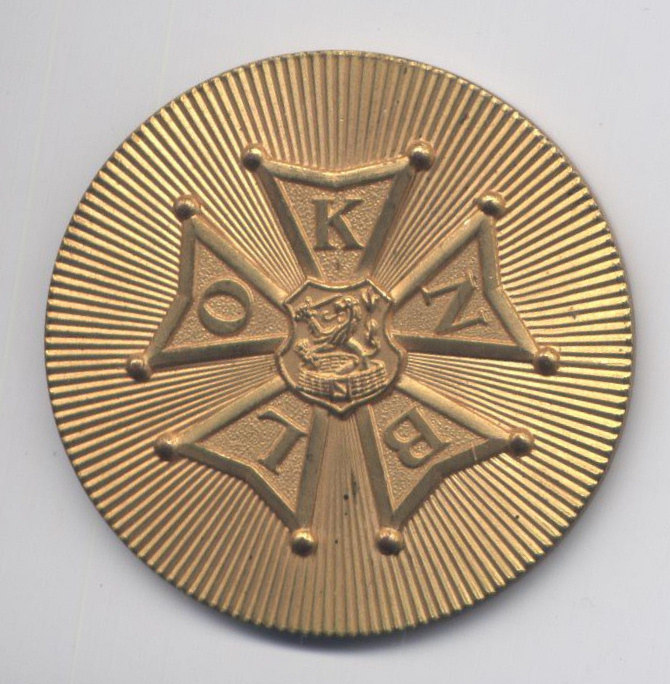
- Obverse of the Group Medal awarded since 1977
- Type: Sports proficiency medal
- Awarded for: Groups finishing The Nijmegen March
- Country: The Netherlands
- Presented by: The Royal Dutch League for Physical Education
- Status: Currently awarded
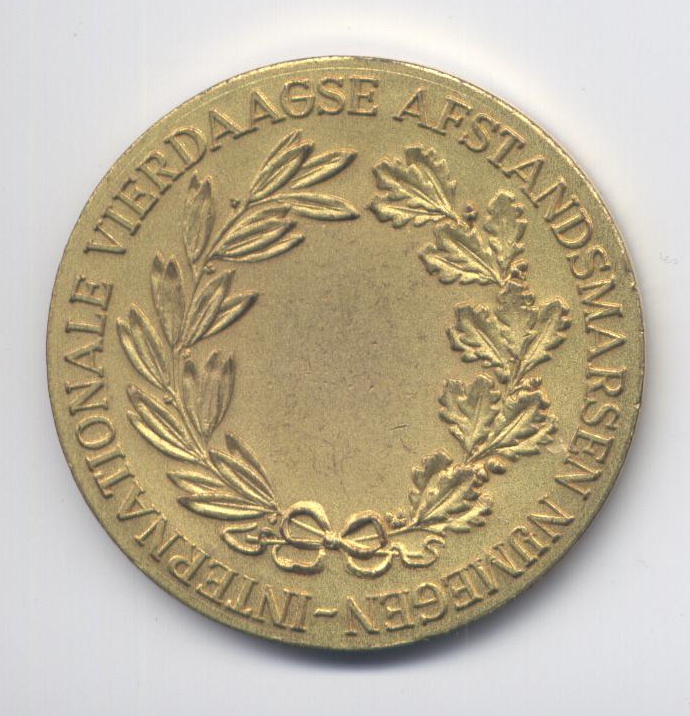
- Reverse of the Group Medal awarded since 1977

The Group Medal of the Four Day Marches (Dutch: Groepsmedaille van der Vierdaagse) is a non wearable bronze presentation medal awarded to each registered group who successfully completes all four days of the International Four Days Marches Nijmegen (Vierdaagse in Dutch) held annually at Nijmegen, Netherlands.

== Qualification ==
The medal is awarded by the KNBLO, (Koninklijke Nederlandsche Bond Voor Lichamelijke Opvoeding, or Royal Dutch League for Physical Education) who organise the March.

Registered groups must consist of at least 11 members (a leader and 10 other walkers). They are required to start together each morning and be together at checkpoints and the finish. Originally, all had to complete the marches for the group to receive the award. Since 1973 a group can qualify if no more than 10% of walkers retire during the march. This 10% is rounded up. For example, if a team has 13 participants at the start, 10% equates to 1.3, and up to two group members can withdraw and the group medal still be awarded. Both civilian groups and military detachments qualify, one medal per group. The Group Medal is awarded in addition to the Cross for the Four Day Marches that is awarded to each successful individual group member.

== History ==
The Group Medal was being awarded as early as 1913 to military detachments and was known as the korpsprijs. Civilian groups were first allowed to register for the Vierdaagse in 1923. They became eligible for the Group Medal on the same terms as military groups, civilian groups out-numbering military ones by the early 1930s.

In 1928 four groups from Great Britain took part for the first time. The four Group Medals they earned were mounted on what was titled the Nijmegen Shield. This is still awarded as a trophy for a 20-mile race organised by the British Race Walking Association.

As well as the Vierdaagse at Nijmegen, the medal was also awarded to groups who took part in the four day marches organised in various locations in the Dutch East Indies between 1935 and 1939.

== Design ==
All medals are of bronze or bronze gilt and have a diameter of 53 mm. Until about 1930 the medal had a top ring, although it was never awarded with a ribbon.

Obverse. Until 1977 the medal bore the image of the reigning Queen, first Wilhelmina then, from 1951 – once a new portrait has been approved – Juliana. After 1977 the design was changed to a representation of the Cross for the Four Day Marches.

Reverse. Until 1977 the wording Nederlandsche Bond Voor Lichamelijke Opvoeding circling a wreath, with Koninklijke added from 1959 when the league received the Koninklijke (Royal) prefix. Since 1977 the inscription has read Internationale Vierdaagse Afstandsmarsen Nijmegen. The medal is sometimes seen with the name of the military unit or walking club engraved within the wreath, along with the year of award.

== Related awards ==
- Cross for the Four Day Marches
- Orderly Medal of the Four Day Marches
