= Firefighters Memorial Walk =

The Firefighters Memorial Walk, formerly known as the Sara Killey Memorial Walk, is organised each year by the Isle of Man Fire and Rescue Service. Proceeds go to The Firefighters Charity, which provides assistance to serving and retired fire service staff and their families.

The first walk, in 2008, was called the Seven Station Challenge and covered a distance of 50.5 miles (81.3 km). In subsequent years the walk has followed the Parish Walk course from Peel Fire Station, via Kirk Michael Fire Station and finishing at Ramsey Fire Station, a distance of exactly 50 kilometres (31.07 mi). Later, the walk was renamed Sara Killey Memorial Walk in memory of former fire service worker Sara Killey who died in 2007. In 2016, the walk was again renamed the Firefighters Memorial Walk, in memory not only of Sara but also other colleagues and friends with a close association to the Isle of Man Fire and Rescue Service.

It is regarded as an ideal warm up for the full 85-mile (137 km) Parish Walk which takes place two months later.

In 2018, the race was won David Mapp in 4 hours, 43 minutes and 45 seconds. The women's race was won by Hannah Hunter in a record time of 5 hours, 11 minutes and 6 seconds by a woman and she finished in 3rd position overall.

== Past winners ==
Year	Men's Winner	Time	Women's Winner	Time	Overall Position
2009	Mark Hempsall	04:58:51	Janice Quirk	05:22:40	9th
2010	Jock Waddington	05.02.32	Shirley Gage	05:58:50	19th=
2011	Michael George	05:03:49	Sally Walker	05:38:54	7th
2012	Michael George	04:52:41	Michelle Turner	05:26:44	9th
2013	Michael George	04:40:30	Sue Biggart & Maureen Moffatt	05:40.25	12th=
2014	Richard Gerrard	04:43:50	Karen Chiarello	05:37:44	9th=
2015	Richard Gerrard	04:46:16	Michelle Turner	05:17:41	4th=
2016	David Walker & Samuel Fletcher	05:02:47	Karen Chiarello	05:21:23	5th
2017	David Walker	05:15:09	Karen Chiarello	05:17:31	2nd
2017	David Mapp	04:43:45	Hannah Hunter	05:11:06	3rd
