= IML Walking Association =

International walking association

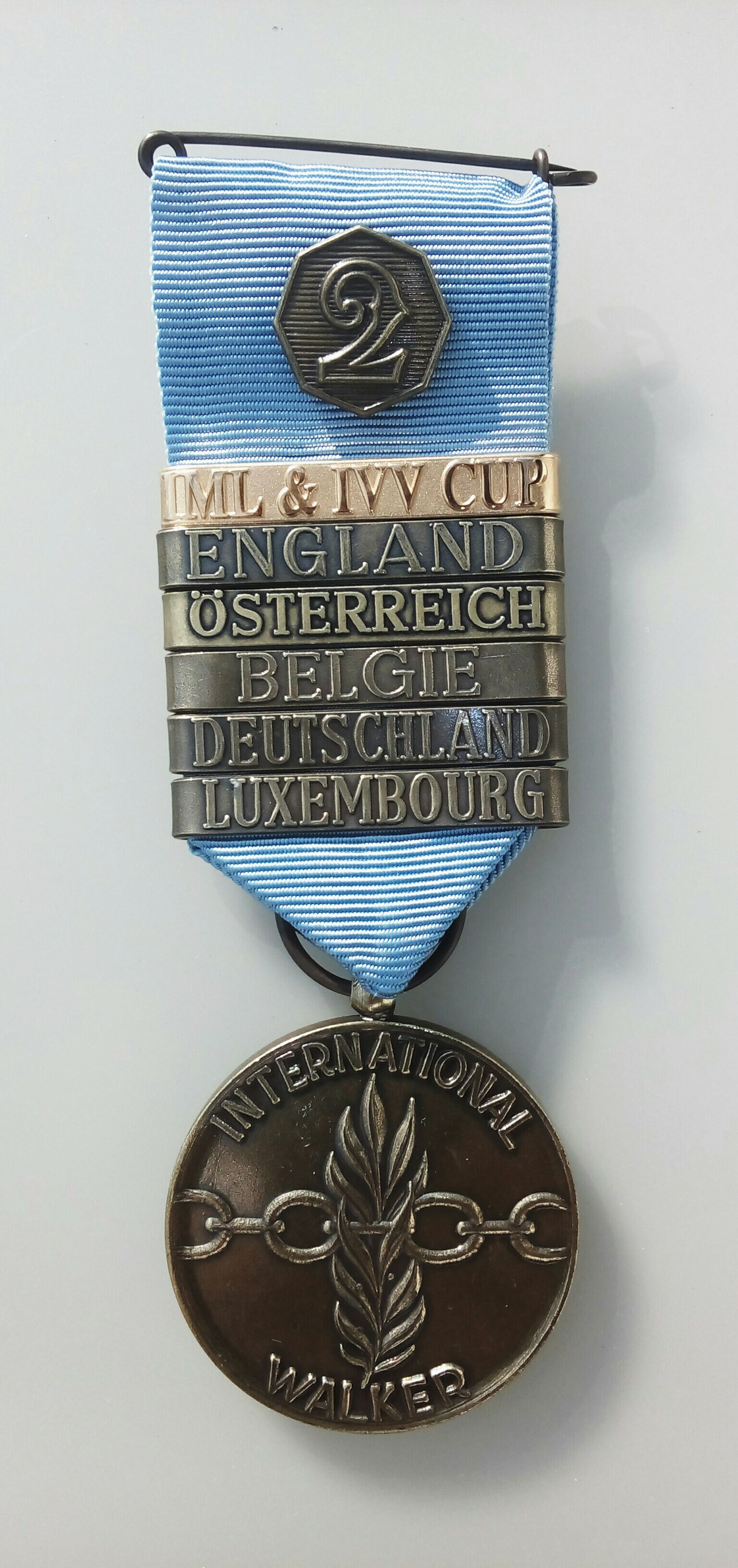
IML Medaille

The IML Walking Association (until 2006 named the International Marching League (IML)) is a non-profit organization that promotes recreational walking in the form of international non-competitive multi-day walking events ("marches") in its member countries. The motto of the organization is Nos iungat ambulare ("May walking bring us together").

== History ==
IML has its origins in the annual International Four Days Marches Nijmegen, Netherlands, organized by the Dutch KNBLO (now the KWBN). The success of this event and the increasing number of foreign walkers led, from the late 1960s, to the KNBLO helping to set up similar annual events in other countries. These include Hærvejsmarchen in Viborg, Denmark; Marche internationale de Diekirch in Diekirch, Luxembourg; the International Four Days Walks in Castlebar, Ireland; and the Two Days March of Bern, Switzerland. In 1977 the Japan Walking Association established the Japan Three Day March, the first annual non-competitive walking event outside Europe. In 1986 the multi-day walking event organizations of Austria, Belgium, Denmark, Ireland, Japan, Luxembourg, the Netherlands and Switzerland agreed to form the International Marching League, which was officially founded in 1987. Since then, membership has steadily increased, with the United Kingdom represented by the International Waendel Walk in Wellingborough since 1990, and new events organised in the Far East, Australia, New Zealand, the United States and Canada.

In 2006, the general meeting of the participating organizations decided to take the current IML Walking Association title.

== Activities ==
The IML Walking Association promotes a series of walking events in 29 countries, subdivided into the European Region (including Israel) and the Pan Pacific Region (including Canada and the USA). Normally, there is only one authorized IML event per member country, but a second can be accepted under certain conditions, in particular if it is held at a sufficient distance from the first and in a different topography. New member events can be admitted if they have been held for three years and offer routes over a minimum distance of 20 km per day. They are first accepted as a candidate event and then as a member event by the IML General Meeting. Some events have been discontinued in the meantime.

Walkers participating in IML affiliated events may buy a "passport" in which successful participation is recorded, and may also obtain medals and certificates based upon the number of completed walks. Each walking event has a minimum duration of two days, with a minimum daily distance of 20 km to count towards IML awards. Most events also offer walks over shorter and longer distances.

In the tradition of the Four Days Marches of Nijmegen which started as a training event for the Dutch military, the IML events are also attended by military units.
