= List of Cypriot records in athletics =

The following are the national records in athletics in Cyprus maintained by its national athletics federation: The Amateur Athletic Association of Cyprus (Greek: Κυπριακή Ομοσπονδία Ερασιτεχνικού Αθλητισμού Στίβου) (ΚΟΕΑΣ).

== Outdoor ==
Key to tables: Awaiting ratification Record not kept by ΚΟΕΑΣ Not ratified or later rescinded by ΚΟΕΑΣ

=== Men ===
Event	Record	Athlete	Date	Meet	Place	Ref.
100 m	10.11 (+1.5 m/s)	Ioannis Zisimides	25 May 1996		Rethymno, Greece	
150 m (bend)	15.77 (±0.0 m/s)	Antonios Katsantonis	16 June 2026	65th Ostrava Golden Spike	Ostrava, Czech Republic	
200 m	20.37 (+1.9 m/s)	Prodromos Katsantonis	19 July 1998		Athens, Greece	
400 m	46.16	Evripides Demosthenous	10 July 1999	Universiade	Palma de Mallorca, Spain	
600 m	1:18.22	Stavros Spyrou	25 March 2023	25 March Open Meeting	Nicosia, Cyprus	
800 m	1:47.17	Spyros Spyrou	15 September 1983		Casablanca, Morocco	
1500 m	3:39.50	Amine Khadiri	3 June 2016	12th Meeting Iberoamericano	Huelva, Spain	
Mile	3:59.33	Amine Khadiri	18 July 2019	Cork City Sports	Cork, Ireland	
3000 m	7:59.11 (Note: indoor mark ratified as absolute record)	Marios Kassianidis	1 September 1982		Athens, Greece	
5000 m	13:34.29	Filippos Filippou	27 August 1983		Riccione, Italy	
5 km (road)	15:13+	Amine Khadiri	19 February 2023	Seville Marathon	Seville, Spain	
10,000 m	28:26.87	Marios Kassianidis	19 June 1981		Prague, Czechoslovakia	
10 km (road)	30:25+	Amine Khadiri	19 February 2023	Seville Marathon	Seville, Spain	
15 km (road)	45:54+	Amine Khadiri	19 February 2023	Seville Marathon	Seville, Spain	
20 km (road)	1:01:12+	Amine Khadiri	19 February 2023	Seville Marathon	Seville, Spain	
Half marathon	1:02:02	Amine Khadiri	29 January 2023		Marrakesh, Morocco	
25 km (road)	1:16:36+	Amine Khadiri	19 February 2023	Seville Marathon	Seville, Spain	
30 km (road)	1:32:01+	Amine Khadiri	19 February 2023	Seville Marathon	Seville, Spain	
Marathon	2:19:51	Marios Kassianidis	8 October 1982	Commonwealth Games	Brisbane, Australia	
Marathon	2:10:20 (Note: official gun time; 2:10:18 chip time by ΚΟΕΑΣ source)	Amine Khadiri	19 February 2023	Seville Marathon	Seville, Spain	
110 m hurdles	13.25 (±0.0 m/s)	Milan Trajkovic	9 July 2017	London Grand Prix	London, United Kingdom	
400 m hurdles	49.5 h	Stavros Tziortzis	28 June 1972		Piraeus, Greece	
400 m hurdles	49.66	Stavros Tziortzis	2 September 1972	Olympic Games	Munich, West Germany	
400 m hurdles	49.21	Minas Alozidis	14 June 2008		Athens, Greece	
3000 m steeplechase	8:24.01	Filippos Filippou	15 September 1983		Casablanca, Morocco	
High jump	2.35 m	Kyriakos Ioannou	29 August 2007	World Championships	Osaka, Japan	
Pole vault	5.56 m (Note: indoor mark ratified as absolute record)	Fotis Stefani	9 June 2000		Minsk, Belarus	
Long jump	7.86 m (+0.8 m/s)	Dimitrios Araouzos	25 March 1982		Nicosia, Cyprus	
Long jump	7.86 m (Note: ratified by ΚΟΕΑΣ but not recognized by World Athletics)	Dimitrios Araouzos	14 April 1984		Boise, United States	
Long jump	7.86 m	Michael Rodosthenous	24 May 1986		Chania, Greece	
Long jump	7.89 m (−0.1 m/s)	Konstantinos Pantazis	12 June 2003		Catania, Italy	
Triple jump	17.13 m (+0.7 m/s)	Marios Hadjiandreou	11 July 1991		Athens, Greece	
Shot put	19.84 m	Lourcas Louca	9 April 1975		Athens, Greece	
Shot put	19.97 m	Michalis Louca	28 June 2000		Athens, Greece	
Discus throw	66.32 m	Apostolos Parellis	30 September 2019	World Championships	Doha, Qatar	
Hammer throw	78.61 m	Iosif Kesidis	26 June 2026	Boris Hanžeković Memorial	Zagreb, Croatia	
Javelin throw	77.65 m	Paraskevas Batzavalis	19 May 2019	Spring National Championships "Matsia"	Nicosia, Cyprus	
Decathlon	7802 pts	Georgios Andréou	11–12 August 2000		Volos, Greece	
Decathlon	100m / Long jump / Shot put / High jump / 400m / 110m H / Discus / Pole vault / Javelin / 1500m; 10.83 / 7.16 m / 15.16 m / 1.96 m / 51.21 / 15.37 / 45.13 m / 4.90 m / 59.31 m / 5:03.03					
20,000 m walk (track)	1:57:48	Yiannis Demetriou	7 October 1978		Piraeus, Greece	
20 km walk (road)	1:47:29	Ioannis Karpasitis	8 March 1959		Athens, Greece	
50 km walk (road)	5:16:59	John Constandinou	29 October 2006	Swiss National Championships	Yverdon-les-Bains, Switzerland	
4 × 100 m relay	39.12	Cyprus; Georgios Skender; Anninos Marcoullides; Prodromos Katsantonis; Yiannis Zisimides	18 June 1997	Mediterranean Games	Bari, Italy	
4 × 400 m relay	3:11.16	Cyprus; Antonios Agiomamitis; G. Afamis; Konstantinos Pochanis; Evripides Demosthenous	7 June 1998		Belgrade, F.R. Yugoslavia	

=== Women ===
Event	Record	Athlete	Date	Meet	Place	Ref.
100 m	11.25 (+1.1 m/s)	Ramona Papaioannou	18 June 2016	Cypriot Championships	Nicosia, Cyprus	
100 m	11.25 (+1.6 m/s)	Olivia Fotopoulou	8 July 2023	Cypriot Championships	Nicosia, Cyprus	
200 m	22.61 (+0.1 m/s)	Eleni Artymata	31 July 2010	European Championships	Barcelona, Spain	
300 m	36.41	Eleni Artymata	20 June 2019	Golden Spike Ostrava	Ostrava, Czech Republic	
400 m	50.80	Eleni Artymata	4 August 2021	Olympic Games	Tokyo, Japan	
800 m	2:01.77	Natalia Evangelidou	12 April 2018	Commonwealth Games	Gold Coast, Australia	
1500 m	4:10.98	Natalia Evangelidou	9 April 2018	Commonwealth Games	Gold Coast, Australia	
Mile	4:53.80	Meropi Panayiotou	3 May 2014	Jace Lacoste Invitational	Starkville, United States	
3000 m	9:02.18	Andri Avraam	23 September 1988	Olympic Games	Seoul, South Korea	
5000 m	16:13.25	Andri Avraam	14 August 1988		Hengelo, Netherlands	
5 km (road)	16:08	Thalia Charalambous	3 October 2021	Österreichischer Frauenlauf	Vienna, Austria	
10,000 m	32:59.30	Andri Avraam	26 September 1988	Olympic Games	Seoul, South Korea	
10 km (road)	35:10+ Wo	Thalia Charalambous	17 October 2020	World Half Marathon Championships	Gdynia, Poland	
15 km (road)	52:57+ Wo	Thalia Charalambous	17 October 2020	World Half Marathon Championships	Gdynia, Poland	
20 km (road)	1:10:57+ Wo	Thalia Charalambous	17 October 2020	World Half Marathon Championships	Gdynia, Poland	
Half marathon	1:14:40 Wo	Thalia Charalambous	17 October 2020	World Half Marathon Championships	Gdynia, Poland	
25 km (road)	1:31:27+	Dagmara Handzlik	7 July 2019	Gold Coast Marathon	Gold Coast, Australia	
30 km (road)	1:49:35+	Dagmara Handzlik	7 July 2019	Gold Coast Marathon	Gold Coast, Australia	
Marathon	2:34:17	Dagmara Handzlik	7 July 2019	Gold Coast Marathon	Gold Coast, Australia	
100 m hurdles	12.84 (−0.1 m/s)	Natalia Christofi	4 June 2023	Janusz Kusociński Memorial	Chorzów, Poland	
400 m hurdles	54.76	Andri Sialou	4 July 2004		Heraklion, Greece	
3000 m steeplechase	10:40.79	Stella Christoforou	23 April 2011	Georgia vs. Missouri	Athens, United States	
High jump	1.93 m	Leontia Kallenou	15 May 2015	SEC Championships	Starkville, United States	
High jump	1.95 m	Elena Kulichenko	11 May 2024	SEC Championships	Gainesville, United States	
High jump	1.97 m	Elena Kulichenko	8 June 2024	NCAA Division I Championships	Eugene, United States	
Pole vault	4.45 m	Marianna Zachariadi	30 June 2009	Mediterranean Games	Pescara, Italy	
Long jump	6.80 m (+1.9 m/s)	Maria Lambrou-Teloni	24 May 1985		Limassol, Cyprus	
Triple jump	13.94 m	Nina Serbezova	5 July 2012		Limassol, Cyprus	
Triple jump	14.03 m (−0.3 m/s)	Nina Serbezova	30 May 2012	Athina Filothei Women Gala	Athens, Greece	
Shot put	16.71 m	Olympia Menelaou	25 March 2001		Limassol, Cyprus	
Discus throw	59.18 m A	Androniki Lada	25 February 2020		Potchefstroom, South Africa	
Hammer throw	69.29 m	Paraskevi Theodorou	17 May 2009		Tripoli, Libya	
Hammer throw	70.22 m	Valentina Savva	18 July 2025	European U23 Championships	Bergen, Norway	
Javelin throw	57.20 m	Alexandra Tsisiou	17 May 2006		Patras, Greece	
Javelin throw	57.20 m (Note: not recognised by federation as she still had Greek citizenship)	Alexandra Tsisiou	27 May 2006		Patras, Greece	
Heptathlon	5319 pts h	Maria Lambrou-Teloni	3–4 September 1984		Nicosia, Cyprus	
Heptathlon	100m H / High jump / Shot put / 200m / Long jump / Javelin / 800m; 14.2 / 1.63 m / 11.33 m / 24.7 / 6.48 m / 33.76 m / 2:40.0					
20 km walk (road)	2:06:29	Sofia Olimpiou	29 March 2015		Megara, Greece	
50 km walk (road)	5:43:20	Sofia Olimpiou	20 January 2019	Panhellenic Championship	Marathon, Greece	
4 × 100 m relay	43.87	Cyprus; Olivia Fotopoulou; Anna Ramona Papaioannou; Filippa Fotopoulou; Eleni Artymata	9 July 2016	European Championships	Amsterdam, Netherlands	
4 × 400 m relay	3:38.46	Cyprus; Thekla Alexandrou; Stavrini Filippou; Kalypso Stavrou; Kalliopi Kountouri	31 May 2025	Games of the Small States of Europe	Andorra la Vella, Andorra	

=== Mixed ===
Event	Record	Athlete	Date	Meet	Place	Ref.
4 × 400 m relay	3:25.49	Cyprus; Markos Antoniades; Thekla Alexandrou; Paisios Dimitriadis; Kalliopi Kountouri	29 June 2025	European Team Championships	Maribor, Slovenia	

== Indoor ==
=== Men ===
Event	Record	Athlete	Date	Meet	Place	Ref.
50 m	5.72	Anninos Marcoullides	5 February 2000		Nyíregyháza, Hungary	
60 m	6.58	Yiannakis Zisimides	3 March 1996		Piraeus, Greece	
100 m	10.45	Anninos Marcoullides	7 February 1998		Budapest, Hungary	
200 m	20.65	Anninos Marcoullides	1 March 1998		Valencia, Spain	
400 m	47.39	Evripides Demosthenous	14 February 1998		Piraeus, Greece	
800 m	1:48.23	Christos Dimitriou	27 January 2018	Indoor Track & Field Vienna	Vienna, Austria	
1500 m	3:42.58	Hristos Papapetrou	1 February 1998		Piraeus, Greece	
Mile	4:11.37	George Loukaidis	17 February 1995		United States	
3000 m	7:54.16	Christos Papapetrou	6 February 1998		Budapest, Hungary	
60 m hurdles	7.51	Milan Trajkovic	4 March 2018	World Championships	Birmingham, United Kingdom	
High jump	2.32 m	Kyriacos Ioannou	7 February 2008		Novi Sad, Serbia	
High jump	2.32 m	Kyriacos Ioannou	13 February 2016		Hustopeče, Czech Republic	
High jump	2.32 m	Dimitrios Chondrokoukis	14 February 2015	Greek Championships	Piraeus, Greece	
Pole vault	5.61 m	Nikandros Stylianou	25 February 2017	Balkan Championships	Belgrade, Serbia	
Long jump	7.68 m	Dimitrios Araouzos	12 February 1983		Moscow, United States	
Triple jump	16.88 m	Marios Hadjiandreou	20 February 1988		Piraeus, Greece	
Shot put	19.43 m	Georgios Arestis	31 January 2009		Athens, Greece	
Weight throw	21.30 m	Alexandros Poursanides	7 January 2016	Doc Hale VT Elite	South Carolina, United States	
Heptathlon	5895 pts	Georgios Andreou	11–12 February 2000		Piraeus, Greece	
Heptathlon	60m / Long jump / Shot put / High jump / 60m H / Pole vault / 1000m; 6.95 / 7.42 m / 15.16 m / 2.08 m / 8.34 / 4.90 m / 3:04.15					
3000 m walk	16:49.42	John Constandinou	19 February 2006	AVIVA Indoor Grand Prix	Birmingham, United Kingdom	
5000 m walk						
4 × 400 m relay	3:34.73	Cyprus; Stefanos Anastasiou; Apostolides; Ioannides; Antoniou	14 March 2009		Athens, Greece	

=== Women ===
Event	Record	Athlete	Date	Meet	Place	Ref.
60 m	7.26	Olivia Fotopoulou	22 February 2023	Madrid Indoor Meeting	Madrid, Spain	
200 m	23.07	Olivia Fotopoulou	14 February 2026	One Day Indoor Match	Athens, Greece	
400 m	52.91	Androula Sialou	7 February 2004		Athens, Greece	
800 m	2:06.52	Natalia Evangelidou	25 February 2017	Balkan Championships	Belgrade, Serbia	
1500 m	4:14.62	Natalia Evangelidou	21 February 2018	AIT International Grand Prix	Athlone, Ireland	
3000 m	9:40.52	Meropi Panagiotou	18 January 2014	Auburn Invitational	Birmingham, United States	
60 m hurdles	7.92	Natalia Christofi	22 January 2023	CMCM Meeting	Kirchberg, Luxembourg	
High jump	1.93 m (Note: outdoor mark ratified as absolute record)	Leontia Kallenou	13 March 2015	NCAA Division I Championships	Fayetteville, United States	
High jump	1.95 m (Note: outdoor mark ratified as absolute record)	Elena Kulichenko	1 March 2025	SEC Championships	College Station, United States	
Pole vault	4.41 m	Marianna Zachariadi	21 February 2009		Piraeus, Greece	
Long jump	6.53 m (1st jump)	Filippa Fotopoulou	20 February 2021	Balkan Championships	Istanbul, Turkey	
Long jump	6.53 m (5th jump)	Filippa Fotopoulou	20 February 2021	Balkan Championships	Istanbul, Turkey	
Long jump	6.53 m	Filippa Fotopoulou	18 January 2025	Sparkassen Meeting	Dortmund, Germany	
Triple jump	13.32 m	Maria Diikiti	13 February 2005		Sofia, Bulgaria	
Shot put	16.19 m	Olympia Menelaou	18 February 2001		Piraeus, Greece	
Weight throw	18.47 m	Emilia Kolokotroni	20 January 2024	TRACK at new balance Collegiate Showdown	Brighton, United States	
Pentathlon	3156 pts	Rafailia Ioannou	14 February 2016		Piraeus, Greece	
Pentathlon	60m H / High jump / Shot put / Long jump / 800m					
3000 m walk						
4 × 400 m relay						
