= Race Walking Record =

UK magazine

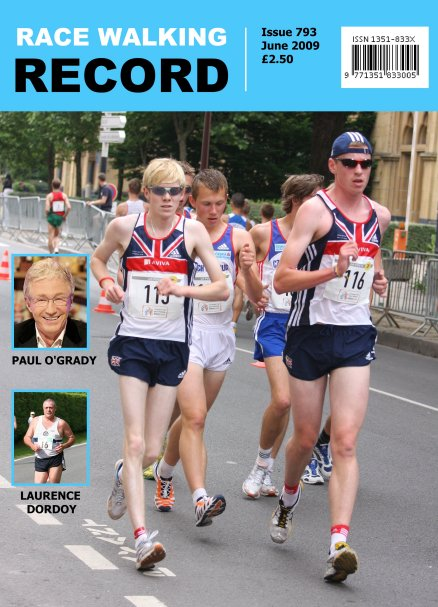
- Race Walking Record cover featuring the British Junior Men's team at the Racewalking European Cup in France.
- Editor: Noel Carmody
- Categories: Sport
- Frequency: Monthly
- Publisher: Race Walking Association
- First issue: November, 1941
- Country: United Kingdom
- Based in: London
- Language: English
- Website: Race Walking Record
- ISSN: 1351-833X

Race Walking Record (abbreviated RWR) is a nonprofit magazine about the sport of race walking, and walking events, primarily aimed at a UK audience. The magazine was founded in London in 1941 by Alf McSweeney in order to keep athletes serving as soldiers in World War II informed about their sport back home. Alf McSweeney was president of the Race Walking Association at the time, and a printer by trade.

Race Walking was a successful Olympic sport for Great Britain at that time. After producing the first issue, the magazine soon became popular. It continues to be produced each month after more than 800 issues in over seventy years.

There have been eleven editors of the magazine since 1941, The current editor is Noel Carmody. Race Walking Record is registered with ISSN 1351-833X.

== Format ==
The magazine started as a monochrome newsletter, later progressing to full colour, and has varied between 8 and 40 pages in length over time. Content includes race reports, results, nutrition advice, technique and coaching advice, photos, letters, editorial, news, international coverage, and upcoming event previews. A digital (pdf) version of the magazine has been available since 2000.

== Distribution ==
The main readership after the UK is Australia, the US, Canada, New Zealand and Russia. Several major athletics organisations around the world are among the subscribers, along with past and current Olympic athletes.

== Special editions ==
In June 2009 the first special edition of the magazine was produced as a way of encouraging people to take part in more walking events and increasing awareness of the sport. The first special edition the 2009 Clerical Medical Parish Walk, an event which saw nearly 2,000 walkers in an 85-mile multi-stage race on the Isle of Man.

The 800th issue was 40 pages, and celebrated the development of racewalking as a sport.

== Full list of editors ==
- Alf McSweeney - 1941–1948, 1953-1962 (Issues 1-81, 116–243)
- Gerald Swan - 1948-1953 (Issues 82–115)
- John Keown - 1962-1968 (Issues 244–305)
- Ken Best - 1968-1970 (Issues 306–335)
- Alan Buchanan - 1970-1981 (Issues 336–468)
- John Hedgethorne - 1981–1985, 1988-2000 (Issues 469–511, 554–687)
- Peter Marlow - 1985-1988 (Issues 512–553)
- Peter Cassidy - 2000 (Issues 687–689)
- Tim Watt - 2000-2009 (Issues 690–791)
- John Constandinou - 2009-2013 (Issues 792–811)
- Catharine Telling - March 2013 to date (Issues 812 to 830)
- Noel Carmody - March 2013 to date (Issues 831 to date)
