= Jogja International Heritage Walk =

Annual walking event in Yogyakarta, Indonesia

Jogja International Heritage Walk (JIHW)
- Status: Active
- Genre: Walking
- Frequency: Annual
- Venue: Yogyakarta
- Country: Indonesia
- Years active: 2008–present
- Previous event: November 18–19, 2017
- Next event: November 17–18, 2018
- Organiser: Jogja Walking Association
- Website: www.jogjaheritagewalk.com

Jogja International Heritage Walk (JIHW) is an international walking event that is held annually at Yogyakarta in the island of Java, Indonesia since 2008. JIHW is usually held in November for two days at Prambanan Temple and Imogiri, covering a distance categories of 5, 10 and 20 kilometers route. Walkers passes through plantation of Karang Tengah, slope of Bantul, and tourists villages of Sleman Regency. The event is organized to promoting the historical and cultural potential of the area, as well as to attract tourist. Many international tourist take part in the event every year. The motto of JIHW walking event is to promote a healthy lifestyle, also to improve communication and interaction between communities of different religions, nationalities, languages and cultural backgrounds.

The event is a member of International Marching League, and Internationaler Volkssportverband (IVV) since 2013. The event is arranged by Jogja Walking Association. Other than the walking competition the event has supporting activities such as Family Fun Walk, Coloring and Umbrella Painting competitions and an educational trip.
