= Athletics at the 1990 Commonwealth Games – Men's long jump =

Men's long jump at the Commonwealth Games

The men's long jump event at the 1990 Commonwealth Games was held on 1 February at the Mount Smart Stadium in Auckland.

== Medalists ==
Gold	Silver	Bronze
Yusuf Alli; Nigeria	Dave Culbert; Australia	Festus Igbinoghene; Nigeria

== Results ==
=== Qualification ===
Rank	Athlete	Nationality	Result	Notes
1	Yusuf Alli	Nigeria	7.92	q
2	Stewart Faulkner	England	7.92	q
3	Festus Igbinoghene	Nigeria	7.89	q
4	Glenroy Gilbert	Canada	7.79	q
5	Will Hinchcliff	New Zealand	7.76	q
6	Barrington Williams	England	7.75	q
7	Jonathan Moyle	New Zealand	7.72	q
8	Gary Honey	Australia	7.69	q
9	John King	England	7.68	q
10	Kareem Streete-Thompson	Cayman Islands	7.65	q
11	Bruny Surin	Canada	7.63	q
12	Dave Culbert	Australia	7.61	q
13	Mark Mason	Guyana	7.53	
13	Michael Morgan	Australia	7.53	
15	Ayo Aladefa	Nigeria	7.51	
16	Mark Forsythe	Northern Ireland	7.46	
17	James Sabulei	Kenya	7.45	
18	Dimitrios Araouzos	Cyprus	7.36	
19	Ian Hilton	Canada	7.27	
20	Laud Codjoe	Ghana	7.23	
21	Ikani Taliai	Tonga	6.60	

=== Final ===
Rank	Name	Nationality	#1	#2	#3	#4	#5	#6	Result	Notes
1st place, gold medalist(s)	Yusuf Alli	Nigeria							8.39w	
2nd place, silver medalist(s)	Dave Culbert	Australia	8.20w	8.00	8.16	7.89	7.97	8.05	8.20w	
3rd place, bronze medalist(s)	Festus Igbinoghene	Nigeria						8.18w	8.18w	
4	Stewart Faulkner	England	7.95	7.97w	x	x	x	?	7.97w	
5	Jonathan Moyle	New Zealand	7.97w						7.97w	
6	Will Hinchcliff	New Zealand							7.97w	
7	Bruny Surin	Canada							7.85w	
8	Glenroy Gilbert	Canada							7.80w	
9	John King	England	x	7.58	7.62w				7.62w	
10	Gary Honey	Australia							7.54w	
11	Kareem Streete-Thompson	Cayman Islands							7.53w	
	Barrington Williams	England	x	x	x				NM	
