= 2011 World Youth Championships in Athletics – Girls' high jump =

Girls' high jump at the 2011 World Youth Championships in Athletics
- Venue: Stadium Lille Métropole
- Dates: 6 July (qualification); 8 July (final)
- Competitors: 31
- Winning height: 1.87 WYL

Medalists
gold medal	Ligia Grozav	Romania
silver medal	Iryna Herashchenko	Ukraine
bronze medal	Chanice Porter	Jamaica

The girls' high jump at the 2011 World Youth Championships in Athletics was held at the Stadium Lille Métropole on 6 and 8 July.

== Medalists ==
Gold	Silver	Bronze
Ligia Grozav; Romania	Iryna Herashchenko; Ukraine	Chanice Porter; Jamaica

== Records ==
Prior to the competition, the following records were as follows.

World Youth Best	Charmaine Gale-Weavers (RSA)	1.96	Bloemfontein, South Africa	4 April 1981
World Youth Best	Olga Turchak (KAZ)	1.96	Donetsk, Ukraine	7 September 1984
Championship Record	Iryna Kovalenko (UKR)	1.92	Sherbrooke, Canada	12 July 2003
World Youth Leading	Iryna Herashchenko (UKR)	1.87	Donetsk, Ukraine	16 June 2011

== Results ==
=== Qualifications ===
Qualification rule: qualification standard 1.80 m or at least best 12 qualified.

==== Group A ====
Rank	Name	Nationality	1,62	1,67	1,72	1,75	Notes
1	Dior Delophont	France	–	o	o	o	q
1	Ligia Grozav	Romania	–	o	o	o	q
3	Iryna Herashchenko	Ukraine	–	o	xo	o	q
4	Lucija Zupžic	Croatia	o	o	o	xo	q
4	Chanice Porter	Jamaica	–	–	–	xo	q
6	Alexandra Plaza	Germany	o	xo	o	xxo	q
7	Nikola Parilová	Czech Republic	o	o	o	xxx	q
7	Ioánna Koltsídou	Greece	o	o	o	xxx	q
9	Leontia Kallenou	Cyprus	–	xo	xo	xxx	
10	Anna Pau	Italy	xxo	o	xxo	xxx	
11	Emily Crutcher	Australia	o	o	xxx		
11	Keeley O'Hagan	New Zealand	o	o	xxx		
13	Dace Dreimane	Latvia	xo	o	xxx		
14	Vivien Baglyos	Hungary	o	xo	xxx		
15	Thea LaFond	Dominica	xo	xxx			

==== Group B ====
Rank	Name	Nationality	1,62	1,67	1,72	1,75	Notes
1	Laura Voss	Germany	o	o	xo	xo	q
2	Réka Czúth	Hungary	xo	o	o	xxo	q
3	Gintarė Nesteckytė	Lithuania	o	xo	xo	xxo	q
4	Undine Dindune	Latvia	–	xo	o	xxx	q
5	Krista-Gay Taylor	Jamaica	–	–	xo	xxx	
6	Daniellys Dutil	Cuba	o	o	xxo	xxx	
10	Kateryna Tabashnyk	Ukraine	–	o	xxx		
10	Kaitlin Morgan	Australia	–	o	xxx		
10	Philipa Rogan	Ireland	o	o	xxx		
10	Desirée Rossit	Italy	o	o	xxx		
11	Vanessa Varjolampi	Finland	xxo	o	xxx		
12	Wai Yee Fung	Hong Kong	–	xo	xxx		
12	Jeanelle Scheper	Saint Lucia	o	xo	xxx		
14	Katharina Mayer	Austria	xo	xo	xxx		
15	Alexandra Zagora	Greece	xxo	xo	xxx		SB
16	Svetlana Proshkina	Uzbekistan	xo	xxx			

=== Final ===
Rank	Name	Nationality	1,65	1,70	1,75	1,79	1,82	1,85	1,87	1, 89	1,89	1,87	1,85	1,83	Notes
1st place, gold medalist(s)	Ligia Grozav	Romania	–	o	o	o	xo	o	xxo	xxx	x	x	x	o	WYL
2nd place, silver medalist(s)	Iryna Herashchenko	Ukraine	–	o	o	o	o	xo	xxo	xxx	x	x	x	x	WYL
3rd place, bronze medalist(s)	Chanice Porter	Jamaica	–	xo	o	xo	xo	xxx							
4	Laura Voss	Germany	o	o	xxo	o	xxo	xxx							PB
5	Undine Dindune	Latvia	o	xo	o	xo	xxx								SB
6	Dior Delophont	France	o	o	o	xxo	xxx								
7	Nikola Parilová	Czech Republic	o	o	o	xxx									
8	Gintarė Nesteckytė	Lithuania	o	o	xo	xxx									
9	Lucija Zupžic	Croatia	o	o	xxx										
10	Réka Czúth	Hungary	o	o	xxx										
11	Alexandra Plaza	Germany	o	xo	xxx										
12	Ioanna Koltsídou	Greece	o	xxx											
