= Orderly Medal of the Four Day Marches =

Orderly Medal of the Four Day Marches Verzorgingsmedaille van der Vierdaagse
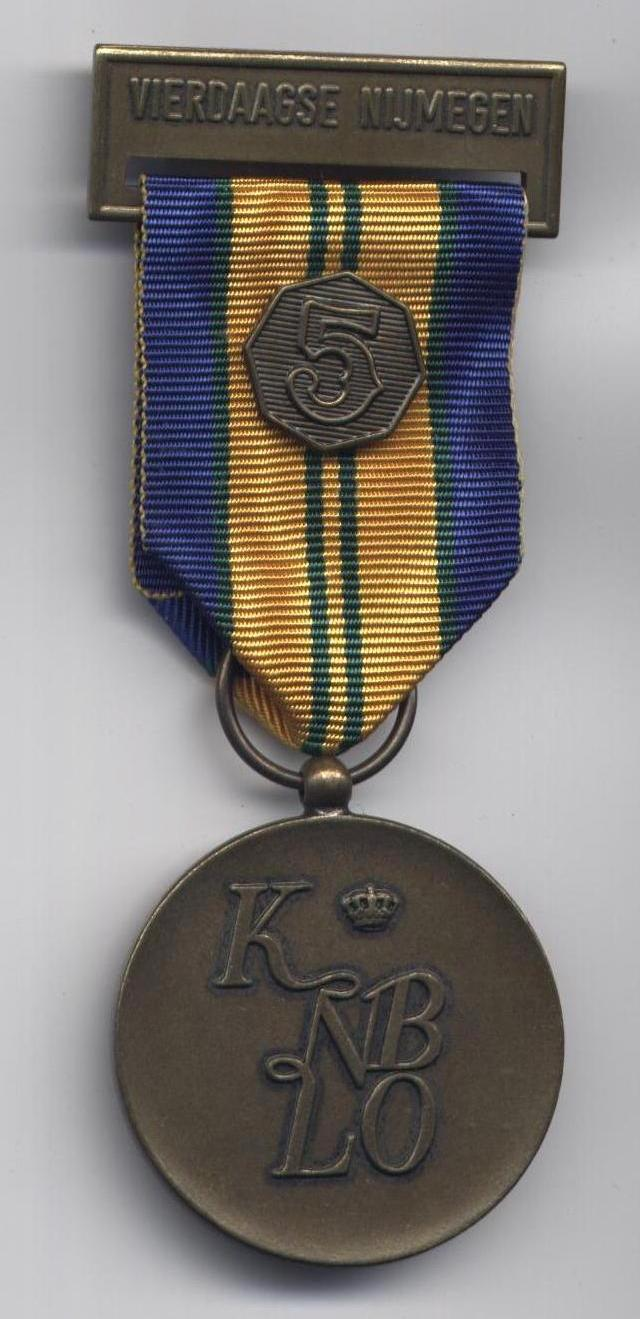
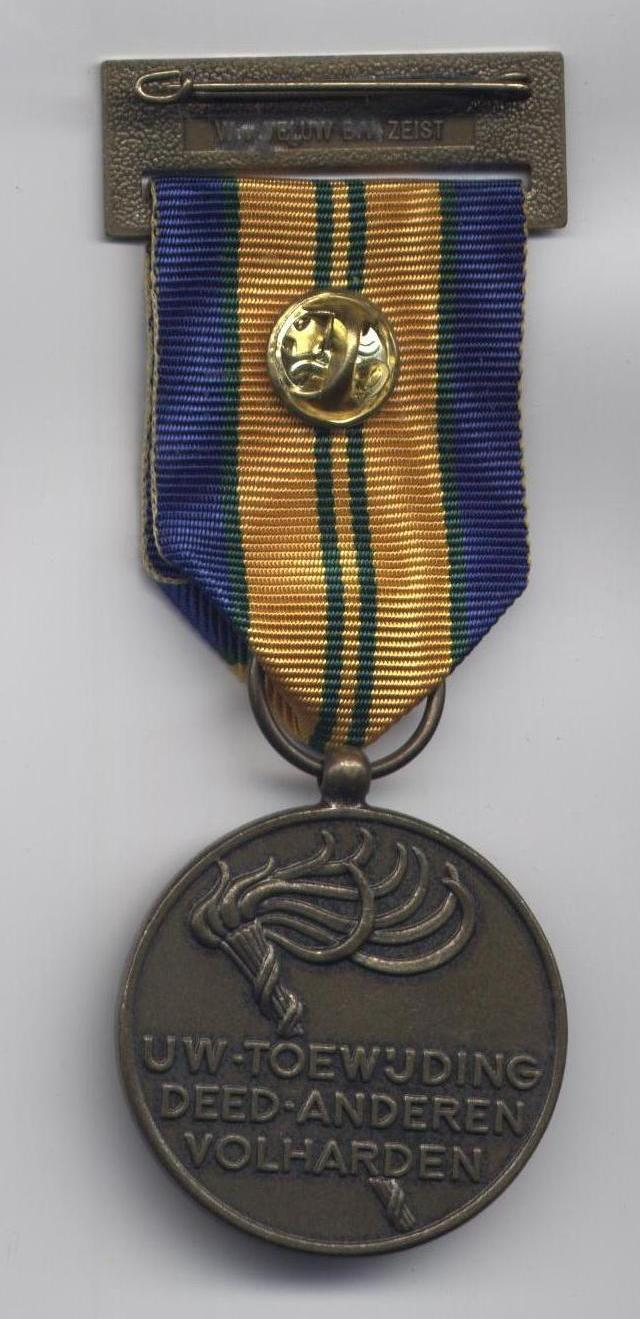
- Orderly Medal, obverse and reverse
- Type: Commemorative medal
- Awarded for: Supporting a registered marching group during the entire International Four Days Marches Nijmegen.
- Description: Uw toewijding deed anderen volharden (Your dedication ensured that others have succeeded)
- Country: The Netherlands
- Presented by: The Royal Dutch League for Physical Education
- Status: Not officially recognised after 2016, but can still be purchased privately.
- Established: 1965
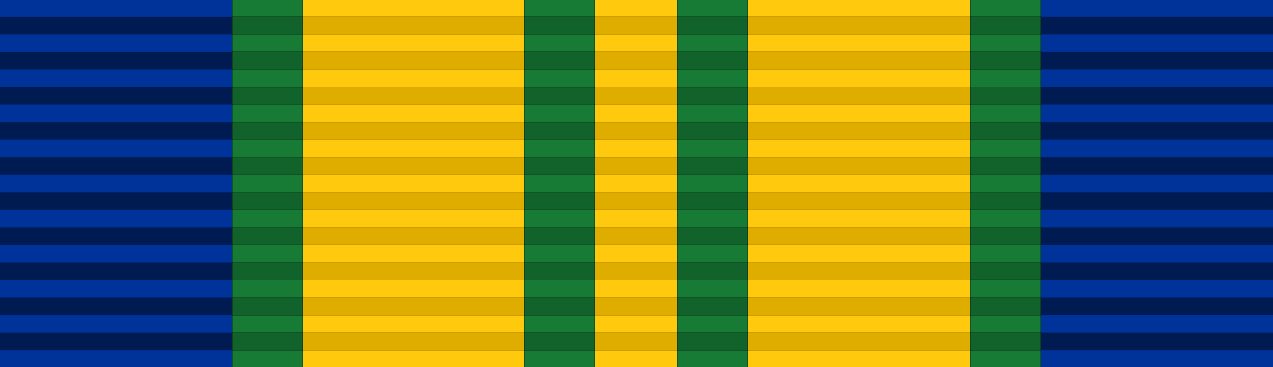
- Ribbon bar of the medal

The Orderly Medal of the Four Day Marches (In Dutch: Verzorgingsmedaille van der Vierdaagse) was awarded between in 1965 and 2016 by the KNBLO, (Koninklijke Nederlandsche Bond Voor Lichamelijke Opvoeding) or Royal Dutch League for Physical Education, to those who gave support to walkers participating in the International Four Days Marches (Vierdaagse in Dutch) held annually at Nijmegen, the Netherlands.

From 2017, the Orderly Medal is no longer mentioned in the March regulations. It is therefore no longer awarded as an official Vierdaagse medal. It can however still be purchased from Praefero, the official Vierdaagse supplier, and worn by those whose support during the event contributes to walkers' success.

== Qualification ==
Orderlies (Verzorgers in Dutch) can receive the medal if they have supported a registered marching group during the entire four day march. They do not qualify for the Vierdaagse Cross. The criteria for orderlies to both civilian groups and military detachments are the same.

Each registered group is allowed an orderly on a bicycle (not motor assisted) to support them during the marches, carrying food, drink and first aid supplies. Groups of between 11–20 participants may register one orderly and groups of 21 or more, a maximum of two.

Being an orderly can be hard work. Groups typically march 40 km per day for the 4 days. The team orderly usually cycles about 60 km per day since there are sections of the walking route where cyclists are not allowed as the path is too narrow and crowded.

If an orderly earns the award again, the relevant number is attached to the ribbon.

The bronze medal has also been awarded to others who provide support to the Vierdaagse walkers. In 1968 it was awarded to KNBLO Board member Wim van der Laaken for meritorious service. This was a unique award of the bronze medal, and all later Orderly Medal awards for merit have been in gold or silver. Between 2008 and 2016, an adult who accompanied a child between 12 and 15 years throughout the march and thereby walked less than their own regulation distance also qualified for the bronze medal, provided they had registered as a companion in advance.

== Design ==
The medal is bronze, with a diameter of 38 mm. It is suspended from a ribbon similar in design to that of the Vierdaagse Cross but with a blue margins on both sides.
Obverse. The letters “KNBLO” and a small crown.
Reverse. A torch above the inscription "Uw toewijding deed anderen volharden" which translates as "Your dedication ensured that others have succeeded".

Until 1976 the medals were made by the company of Koninklijke Begeer, the contract then moved to W. van Veluw.

== Wearing in military uniform ==
The medal has never been recognised by the Netherlands Ministry of Defence and is not approved for wear on Dutch military uniform. The medal and ribbon bar is however sometimes seen mounted with official Dutch medals.

== Gold and silver medals ==
Gold and silver versions of the medal are awarded by the KNBLO to those who have given exceptional service to the Vierdaagse, normally over many years. They are of the same design and size as the bronze medal, and are suspended from the same ribbon. They are made of yellow or white metal and contain no actual gold or silver. Each medal is only awarded once and there is no provision to make further awards.

Fewer than ten gold medals have been awarded to date. These include one in 1999 to Mrs Roos Bos, the wife of the retiring March Leader Chris Bos for ‘support of her husband over a long period’. While the silver medal is more common, fewer than 100 have so far been awarded.

== Related awards ==
- Cross for the Four Day Marches
- Group Medal of the Four Day Marches
