= Alf McSweeney =

British printer

Alf McSweeney was a British printer best known for founding the magazine Race Walking Record in 1941. He was editor of the magazine for sixteen years.

Alf was also elected president of the Race Walking Association in 1953.
