= Dimitrios Araouzos =

Cypriot long jumper (born 1961)

Personal information
- Born: 19 February 1961 (age 65) Nicosia, Cyprus

Sport
- Sport: Track and field

Dimitrios Araouzos (Greek: Δημήτριος Αραούζος, born 19 February 1961) is a retired Cypriot long jumper.

He finished seventeenth at the 1987 World Indoor Championships. He also competed at the 1984 Olympic Games and the 1990 Commonwealth Games without reaching the final.

His personal best jump was 7.86 metres, achieved in March 1982 in Nicosia. This is the Cypriot record, later equalled by Michael Rodosthenous. His 7.68 achieved in February 1983 in Moscow, Idaho is the Cypriot indoor record.
