= Avondvierdaagse =

Dutch and Surinamese walking event

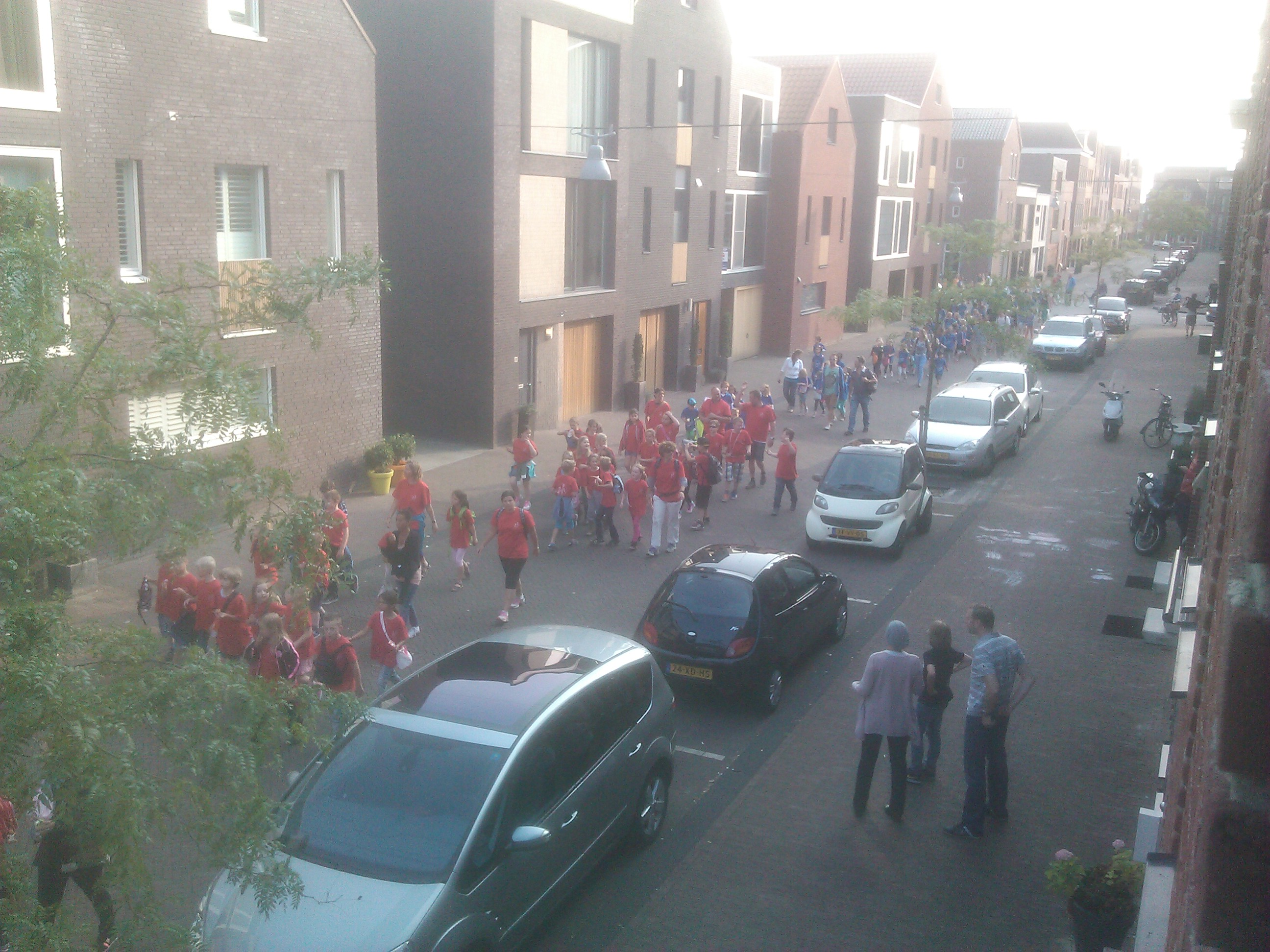
Jeugdavondvierdaagse

The avondvierdaagse (four evenings' walk) is an annual Dutch and Surinamese walking event where the participants walk every evening for four days.

== History ==
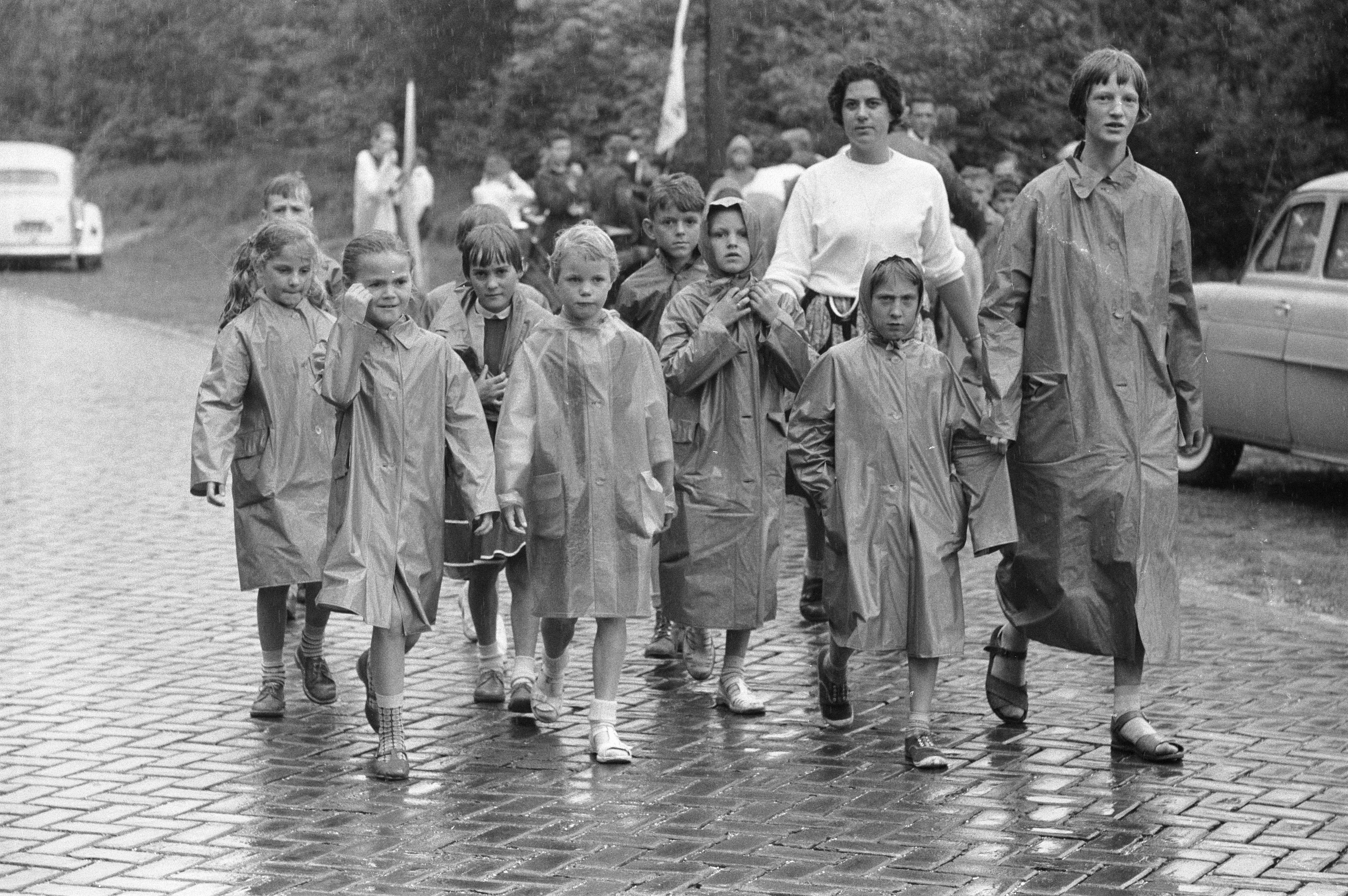
A group of kids being shepherded by two women in the vierdaagse of Breda, 1960

In 1909, the term 'vierdaagse' was introduced for the first time in the Netherlands. The Dutch Association for Physical Education (NBLO) organised walking marches in those days. During the Second World War, these 'walking marches' were prohibited by the occupation forces.

Since there was a demand for a walking event in the Gooi area, walks developed under the term 'wandelvierdaagse'. These walks were first held in 1940, and soon caught on in other places in the Netherlands. When occupation forces found out about this new form of walking, they banned the events as assemblies against the occupiers.

After the Second World War, the avondvierdaagse was re-established by various municipalities and local associations. Within a few years, many avondvierdaagsen were being held again. Currently, almost all cities in the Netherlands have such events, and some of these have grown into major events such as the International Four Days Marches Nijmegen (Nijmeegse Vierdaagse).

Today, overall coordination of these walks is done by the Royal Walkers Union of the Netherlands (Koninklijke Wandelbond Nederland), and the event has its own website.

== Distances ==
Often, avondvierdaagsen are offered in two or three distances: typically five kilometres, ten kilometres, and fifteen kilometres.

Large walking events (such as the International Four Days Marches Nijmegen) have much greater distances, e.g. thirty, forty, or even fifty kilometres.

== See also ==
- International Four Days Marches Nijmegen
