= Barrington Williams =

English sprinter and long jumper (born 1955)

Personal information
- Born: 11 September 1955 (age 70) Jamaica
- Height: 1.77 m (5 ft 10 in)
- Weight: 70 kg (154 lb)

Sport
- Sport: Athletics
- Event(s): long jump, 100 metres
- Club: Cannock Chase & Stafford; Wolverhampton & Bilston AC
- Coached by: Allan Jones (1989)

Barrington Chester Williams (born 11 September 1955) is a now retired English male sprinter and long jumper who competed at the 1988 Summer Olympics.

== Biography ==
Williams represented his country at the 1988 Olympic Games in the 100 metres instead of his preferred long jump because the schedule would force him to compete on a Sunday which was against his religious convictions. He represented England, at the 1990 Commonwealth Games in Auckland, New Zealand and four years later represented England, at the 1994 Commonwealth Games in Victoria, Canada.

Williams finished third behind Linford Christie in the 100 metres event at the 1988 AAA Championships and was twice British long jump champion after winning the British AAA Championships title at the 1991 AAA Championships and 1994 AAA Championships.

== International competitions ==
Year	Competition	Venue	Position	Event	Notes
Representing Great Britain and England
1988	European Indoor Championships	Budapest, Hungary	9th (sf)	60 m	6.68
1988	Olympic Games	Seoul, South Korea	37th (qf)	100 m	10.55
1990	Commonwealth Games	Auckland, New Zealand	6th (q)	Long jump	7.75 m^{1}
1991	World Indoor Championships	Seville, Spain	11th	Long jump	7.67 m
1994	Commonwealth Games	Victoria, Canada	14th (q)	Long jump	7.53 m
1994	European Championships	Helsinki, Finland	19th (q)	Long jump	7.69 m

No mark in the final.

== Personal bests ==
Outdoor

- 100 metres – 10.34 (+1.3 m/s, Birmingham 1988)
- Long jump – 8.01 (-0.2 m/s, Birmingham 1989)

Indoor

- 60 metres – 6.65 (Vittel 1988)
- 200 metres – 21.95 (Birmingham 1998)
- Long jump – 8.05 (Cosford 1989)
