= Leontia Kallenou =

Cypriot high jumper (born 1994)

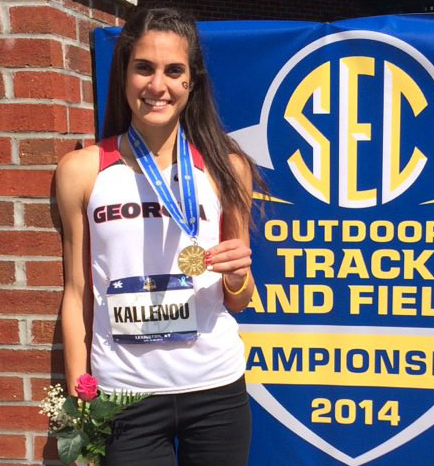
- Leontia after breaking the Cyprus NR (1.92 m)

Personal information
- Nationality: Cypriot
- Born: 5 October 1994 (age 32) Dali, Cyprus
- Height: 180 cm (5 ft 11 in)
- Weight: 64 kg (141 lb)

Sport
- Country: Cyprus
- Sport: Track and field
- Event: High jump
- College team: University of Georgia
- Coached by: Petros Kyprianou

Achievements and titles
- Personal bests: 1.93m. (outdoor) NR; 1.93m. (indoor) NR
Medal record
Women's athletics
NCAA Championships
Gold medal – first place	NCAA Champion 2015	Indoor
Gold medal – first place	NCAA Champion 2014	Outdoor
Gold medal – first place	NCAA Champion 2014	Indoor
European Youth Olympic Festival
Silver medal – second place	Trabzon 2011	High jump
Commonwealth Youth Games
Gold medal – first place	Isle of Man 2011	High jump
Games of the Small States of Europe
Silver medal – second place	Liechtenstein 2011	High jump
European Team Championships
Bronze medal – third place	Third League 2010	High jump
Bronze medal – third place	Third League 2011	High jump

Leontia Kallenou (Greek: Λεοντία Καλλένου, Turkish: Lenotiya Kallenu; born October 5, 1994) is a Cypriot track and field athlete competing in the high jump. She is the current holder of the Cypriot national record in both outdoor (1.93 m) and indoor (1.93 m).

The Cypriot high jumper, who competes for the Georgia Bulldogs, while studying at the University of Georgia, is the reigning American collegiate champion in women's high jump, in both outdoor and indoor.

== Early life ==
Kallenou was born on October 5, 1994, in Dali, Cyprus to a sporting family. Her father George played football while her mother Anna is a physical education teacher and played basketball. Due to sports being a main part of her early life, she initially tried volleyball, swimming and cycling.

She took over track and field when a delegation from the GSP club visited her primary school to recruit talented youngsters. Kallenou went through a try out at GSP stadium and eventually chose high jump, after the coaches noticed that she cleared the bar despite using a wrong technique. Coach Loukas Kalogirou was Kallenou's first coach.

Kallenou graduated in June 2012 from the Private Hellenic School Forum in Nisou and a few months later moved to USA to study at the University of Georgia and compete for the Georgia Bulldogs.

== Cypriot international ==
Kallenou started competing in national track and field events in 2007. In 2008 Kallenou won third place in the age of just 13 at the Pancyprian Athletics Games. Kallenou's first international appearance came in 2009.

=== 2009 ===
The Cypriot high jumper began representing Cyprus in international events in December 2009, at the age of 15. She participated at the World Gymnasiade in Qatar and took fifth position with a jump of 1.78 m.

=== 2010 ===
In May Kallenou took another fifth place, this time in the European Youth Olympic Trials in Moscow. Her first international medal came a month later when she finished 3rd in the European Team Championships in Malta with a jump of 1.80m. Following a 19th position at the World Junior Championship in Moncton, Canada in July, Kallenou had a strong appearance in the inaugural 2010 Youth Olympic Games in Singapore by finishing just shy of the medals in fourth position. With a clearance of 1.79 m, Kallenou recorded the same clearance with the bronze medalist but was ranked fourth on countback due to her failed attempts.

=== 2011 ===
The season was a highly successful year for Kallenou. In June she won silver medal in the Games for Small States of Europe in Liechtenstein and a few days later bronze at the European Team Championships in Iceland. A 15th position in Lille, France at the IAAF World Youth Championships was succeeded by two podium finishes; Silver medal in the European Youth Olympic Festival in Trabzonspor in July and gold medal at the Isle of Man Commonwealth Youth Games in September.

=== 2012 ===
Kallenou didn't participate in many international events in 2012 since she chose to focus on her studies for her last year of high school. The high jumper competed at the World Junior Championship in Barcelona with a 19th position.

=== 2013 ===
Like the previous season, Kallenou once again chose to compete in just a small select of events. In Mersin, Turkey during the Mediterranean Games, Kallenou took 4th position with a then personal best of 1.87m. A month later in Rieti, Italy she finished 5th in the European Athletics Juniors Championships.

=== 2014 ===
Following an exhausting NCAA season, Kallenou chose to compete internationally only in the Glasgow Commonwealth Games. Despite recovering from a fatigue fracture in her foot going into the Games, Kallenou managed to take 4th position with a jump of 1.89m. Although securing qualification to the European Championships at Zurich in August, Kallenou chose not to compete but instead returned to the United States to prepare for the 2015 season.

== University of Georgia ==
In the fall of 2012 Kallenou moved to Athens, Georgia, USA and the University of Georgia on an athletic scholarship, where she is studying business management and marketing. Along with her academic studies, the Cypriot also competes for the Georgia Bulldogs in NCAA Track & Field competition.

=== 2013 ===
For the 2013 indoor season, Kallenou was redshirted for the Lady Bulldogs. She made her first appearance during the outdoor season. Her biggest success came at the NCAA Championships in Eugene, Oregon, where the Cypriot took fourth place with a jump of 1.86 m., at the time an Under-23 national record, earning her a First Team All-American honor.

Kallenou's tenth position in the SEC Championships with a 1.75 m. jump also gave her a spot in the 2013 All-SEC Freshman Team. During the year, Kallenou also won first place at the Georgia Relays UGA Alumni, second place at the Georgia Tech Yellow Jacket Invitational and third spot at the Auburn War Eagle Invitational.

=== 2014 ===
The indoor and outdoor season of 2014 was Kallenou's breakthrough year in the NCAA. Starting with indoor, Kallenou was crowned NCAA Champion at New Mexico when she went over the bar at 1.87m., in an event where she only recorded first attempt clearances.

A few days earlier at the SEC Championships in Texas, Kallenou won first position setting an indoor National Record of 1.90m. The above success granted her various honours. The Cypriot was named in the 2014 First Team All-America, the 2014 All-SEC Freshman Team and the All-SEC First Team. During the indoor season, she also won second position (and top collegiate finisher) with a jump of 1.88m at the Auburn Invitational at Alabama.

After being crowned NCAA champion in indoor, Kallenou set her sights at the outdoor season and sure enough, won top spot at the NCAA Championships in Eugene with a clearance of 1.89m., locking down her seventh consecutive top collegiate finish. She also recorded two consecutive top-five finishes and two First Team All-America certificates at outdoor Nationals.

Earlier in the outdoor season, Kallenou won gold at the SEC Championships by clearing 1.92 m. at Lexington, Kentucky, a jump that is also a Cypriot National Record. In the event, she cleared all five of her attempts on the first try to win her first outdoor high jump title. A week earlier, on May 10, Kallenou cruised to victory at the Georgia Invitational by setting a then-national record (her first) of 1.91 m. Following her very successful outdoor 2014 season (NCAA and SEC champion), she was named in the First Team All-America and the All-SEC First Team.

=== 2015 ===
Following a string of injury problems (what injuries?) at the end of the 2014 season, Kallenou worked intensively during the off-season to be ready for the 2015 Pre-Olympic season. The Cypriot athlete returned strong in competition, by winning gold at the 2015 Indoor SEC Championships in Lexington, Kentucky, with a jump of 1.90m., equaling her indoor PB in the process. Two weeks later, at the NCAA Nationals in Fayetteville, Arkansas, Leontia secured her third consecutive All-American title, by winning gold for the Georgia Bulldogs, improving her own indoor NR by three centimeters.

== High jump progression ==
Outdoor At the age of 15, in 2009, Kallenou cleared the bar at 1.78 m. in Doha, while a year later she managed to overcome 1.80 m. for the first time. Her breakthrough year came in 2013 when at the Mediterranean Games in Turkey, Kallenou took fourth position with 1.87 m, breaking the Cypriot U23 record. In 2014 Kallenou finally managed to break the Cyprus National Record. On May 10, 2014, she set a national record of 1.91 m., passing the 1.90 m. mark for the first time, while a week later, on May 17, she again set a new national record, by clearing 1.92 m at the SEC Championships in Lexington, Kentucky.

Indoor In 2010, she overcame the bar at 1.75 m in Athens, Greece, while two years later she passed the 1.82 m. mark again in the Greek capital. Kallenou became the Cypriot National Record holder in indoor high jump when she passed 1.90 m. on March 1, 2014, at Texas. A year later she improved her PB by three centimeters, passing the bar at 1.93m. in the 2015 NCAA Nationals.

=== National records ===
Kallenou is currently the holder of eight Cypriot national records at women's high jump, both in outdoor and indoor track and field. In December 2009, Kallenou broke her first national record in high jump, setting an Under-15 national record by passing the 1.78 m in Doha, Qatar.

Outdoor:
U15 - 1.78 m set on December 9, 2009, at Doha, Qatar
U20 - 1.87 m set on June 29, 2013, in Mersin, Turkey
U23 - 1.93 m set on May 15, 2015, at Starkville, Mississippi, US
Women's - 1.93 m set on May 15, 2015, at Starkville, Mississippi, US

Indoor:
U18 - 1.75 m set on February 6, 2010, and February 12, 2011, both at Piraeus, Greece
U20 - 1.82 m set on February 22, 2012, at Piraeus, Greece
U23 - 1.93 m set on March 13, 2015, in Arkansas, US
Women's - 1.93 m set on March 13, 2015, in Arkansas, US

== Personal life ==
Kallenou was born and raised in Dali, a suburb town at the south of the capital Nicosia to parents George and Anna. She is the youngest of three siblings, Panayiotis and Irene her older brother and sister respectively.

Kallenou is currently studying at the University of Georgia in the United States, where she is majoring business administration and marketing. Her goal is to become a professional track and field athlete after the completion of her studies.

== See also ==
- Gymnastic Association Pancypria
- Cypriot records in athletics
- Georgia Bulldogs
