= Michael Rodosthenous =

Cypriot long jumper (born 1959)

Michael Rodosthenous (Greek: Μιχάλης Ροδοσθένους, romanized: Michális Rodosthénous; born 15 June 1959) is a retired Cypriot long jumper.

He finished sixteenth at the 1987 European Indoor Championships and competed at the 1986 European Championships without reaching the final.

His personal best jump was 7.86 metres, achieved in May 1986 in Chania. This is the Cypriot record, equalling the former mark by Dimitrios Araouzos.
