= John Constandinou =

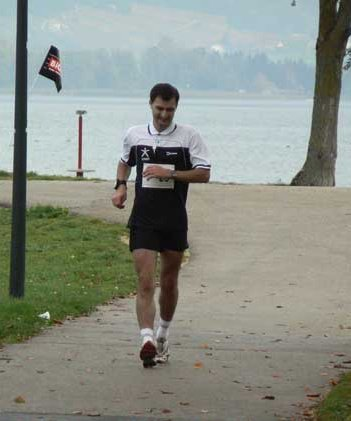
John Constandinou nearing the end of the Swiss National 50km Championships 2006

John Constandinou (Greek: Γιάννης Κωνσταντίνου, romanized: Giánnis Konstantínou; born 16 July 1972) is an athlete who competes internationally for Cyprus in the event of racewalking.

He holds the Cyprus National Records for both the 50 km and 20km walks. * He is also a former ski racer, competing in both Giant slalom and Downhill, and a member of Birchfield Harriers athletics club.

He was editor of the international magazine Race Walking Record from 2009 to 2013.

- Note: A faster Cyprus 20 km walk record exists - the "all-time" record - dating from before Cyprus became a country.

== Personal bests ==
Event	Time	Venue	Date
20km Walk	1:54:54 NR	Lugano, Switzerland	14 March 2010
50 km Walk	5:16:59 NR	Yverdon-les-Bains, Switzerland	29 October 2006
