= Cross for the Four Day Marches =

Dutch decoration

Cross for Marching Proficiency Kruis Voor Betoonde Marsvaardigheid
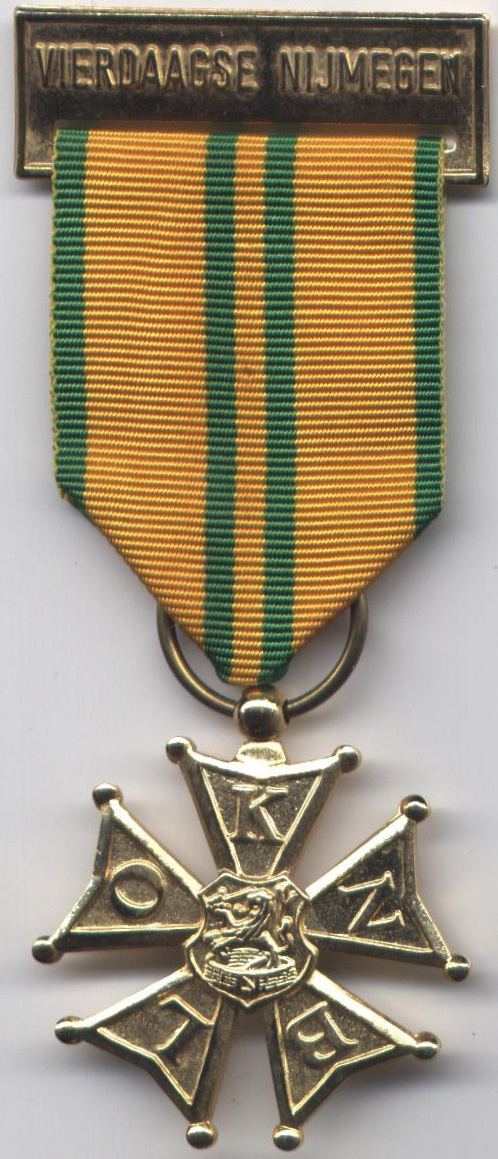
- Bronze cross, awarded for first successful march
- Type: Royal Decoration
- Awarded for: Successful completion of the International Four Days Marches Nijmegen
- Country: The Netherlands
- Presented by: The Royal Dutch League for Physical Education
- Status: Currently awarded
- Ribbon bar of the medal

Precedence
- Next (higher): Order of the Golden Ark
- Equivalent: Awards of Dutch NGO's
- Next (lower): Awards from international organizations

The Cross for the Four Day Marches (Dutch: Vierdaagsekruis) is an official Dutch royal decoration awarded for successful participation in the International Four Days Marches (Vierdaagse in Dutch) held annually at Nijmegen, The Netherlands. The full title of the decoration is Kruis Voor Betoonde Marsvaardigheid (transl. Cross for Marching Proficiency). It is more commonly referred to as the Vierdaagse Cross or Vierdaagsekruis.

== History ==
The cross was established in 1909 at the time of the first march, to award successful military participants of the Vierdaagse. Since 1910 it has been awarded to all participants who successfully complete all four days, both military and civilian. Beginning in 2009 wheelchair users who complete the course have been eligible for the cross.

The Cross is awarded by the Royal Dutch Walking League (KWBN or Koninklijke Wandel Bond Nederland) who organise the Nijmegen Marches. Prior to 2015 the League was known as the Royal Dutch League for Physical Education (KNBLO or Koninklijke Nederlandsche Bond Voor Lichamelijke Opvoeding) and before 1959, when it received the Royal (Koninklijke) prefix, as the NBVLO.

As well as the Vierdaagse at Nijmegen, the cross was also awarded to those who completed the four day marches organised in various locations in the Dutch East Indies between 1935 and 1939.

Normally all four days of the march have to be completed to earn the Cross. However in 2022, when the first day was cancelled due to the predicted extreme heat, the medal was awarded to all those who completed the final three days.

== Wear on military uniforms ==
Although it is awarded by a non-governmental organisation, the Cross has received Royal approval and is therefore an official decoration of the Kingdom of the Netherlands. It can be worn on the uniforms of the Armed forces of the Netherlands and other Dutch uniformed services, including the police, fire brigade and customs services.

This government recognition has extended over the years. Authority to wear in uniform was first granted on 26 October 1909 by Queen Wilhelmina in a Royal Decree to wear to infantry soldiers below officer rank. Other soldiers could accept the decoration, but not wear it. As the March established itself, this authority widened with, for example, sailors of the Royal Netherlands Navy granted permission to wear in 1919, and army and naval officers from 1928.

A number of other nations currently permit the Vierdaagse cross to be worn in military uniform. These include: Denmark, Belgium, Germany, Norway, Sweden (since 1977), Portugal (1980 and resumed since 2024), and South Africa. France previously allowed it, but the Grand Chancery of the Legion of Honour rescinded the authorization in 2016, as foreign decorations are allowed to be worn for French military only if awarded by a sovereign state. Certain United States Armed Forces are authorized to wear the decoration under Army Regulation 600-8-22 or DAFMAN 36-2806 - however, these are not per se authorizations and require that the individual Soldier or Airman gain the appropriate approval(s) prior to wearing the decoration. Countries that do not allow the medal to be worn include Canada, Finland, Ireland, Israel, and the United Kingdom.

== Design ==
The decoration is a five-armed cross, with each arm bearing an initial of the awarding organisation. It has a width of 36 mm at its widest point and is suspended from a green-and-yellow (often orange-yellow) ribbon. Until 1958 the initials on the five arms read: ‘NBVLO’, with ‘KNBLO’ since 1959 to reflect the Koninklijke (Royal) prefix. There have been other minor changes in design over the years. For example, in 1977 the previous silver gilt and silver crosses were replaced by base metal versions, with other design modifications in order to reduce costs.

The reverse is plain except for the name of the manufacturer.

All medals were made by Koninklijke Begeer of the South Holland town of Voorschoten until 1976, when the contract moved to W. van Veluw of Zeist, near Utrecht.

== Award structure ==
Every year a walker successfully completes the march is marked either by a special cross, or a number to be attached to the ribbon of the last cross awarded. A cross is awarded in bronze for the first march, silver for the fifth and gold for the tenth, with a crown added above the cross for the year after each cross is awarded. Appropriate numbers are pinned on the ribbon for intervening years. In recent years further distinct crosses, with crown, have been added for a walker’s fortieth, fiftieth, sixtieth and seventieth successful march. To date the highest ribbon number awarded is 71 to Bert van der Lans, aged 86, in 2018. Annie Berkhout completed her 66th march in 2002 and is the female record holder.

Only one cross, the last one awarded, is worn. For ribbon numbers, only the number most recently received should be worn.

== Numbers awarded ==
Between 1909 and 2022, about 659,800 walkers successfully completed the march 1,729,757 times. Therefore, approximately 659,800 first year crosses have been awarded, with nearly 1,070,000 further awards, including second year crowns, silver and gold crosses and ribbon numbers. Of the awards for the highest number of marches, approximately 851 walkers have been awarded the cross for forty years, about 199 for fifty years and thirteen for sixty years. The cross for seventy years has been awarded only twice, to Bert van der Lans in 2017 and to Dick Koopman in 2019.

== Gallery ==
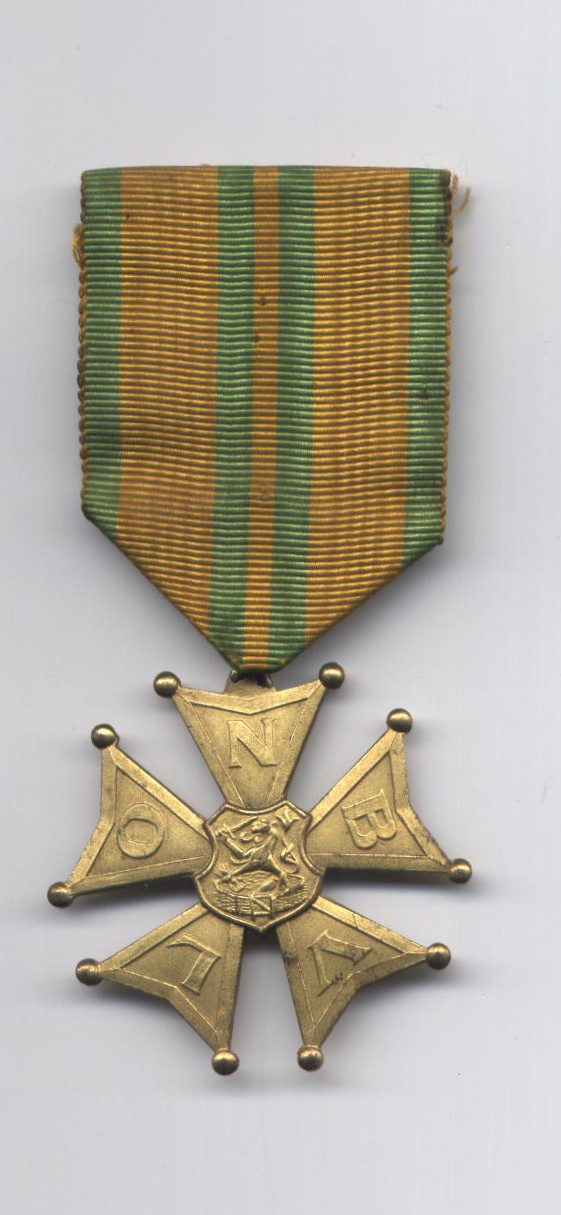
Cross in bronze, 1st year. Pre 1959

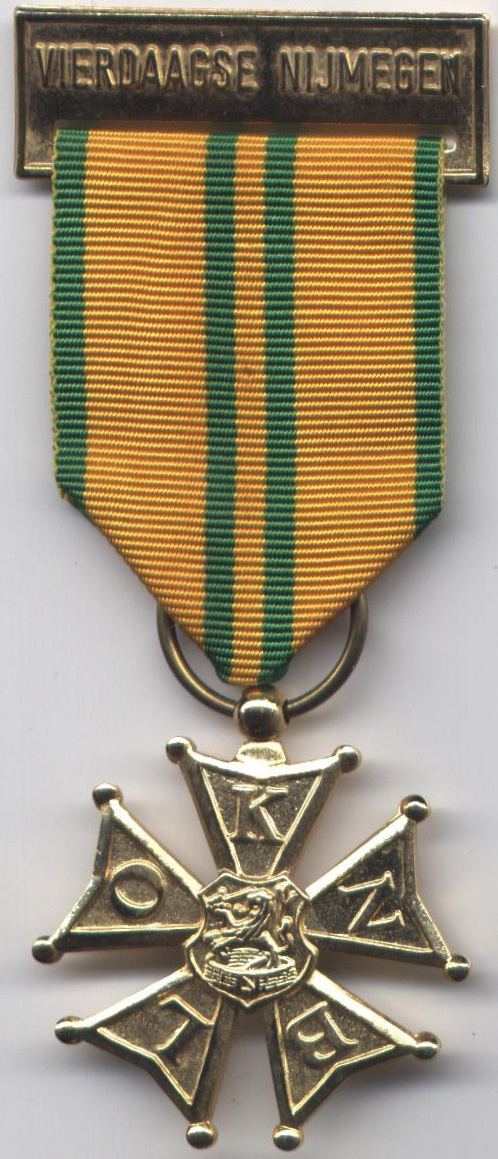
Cross in bronze, 1st year. From 1959

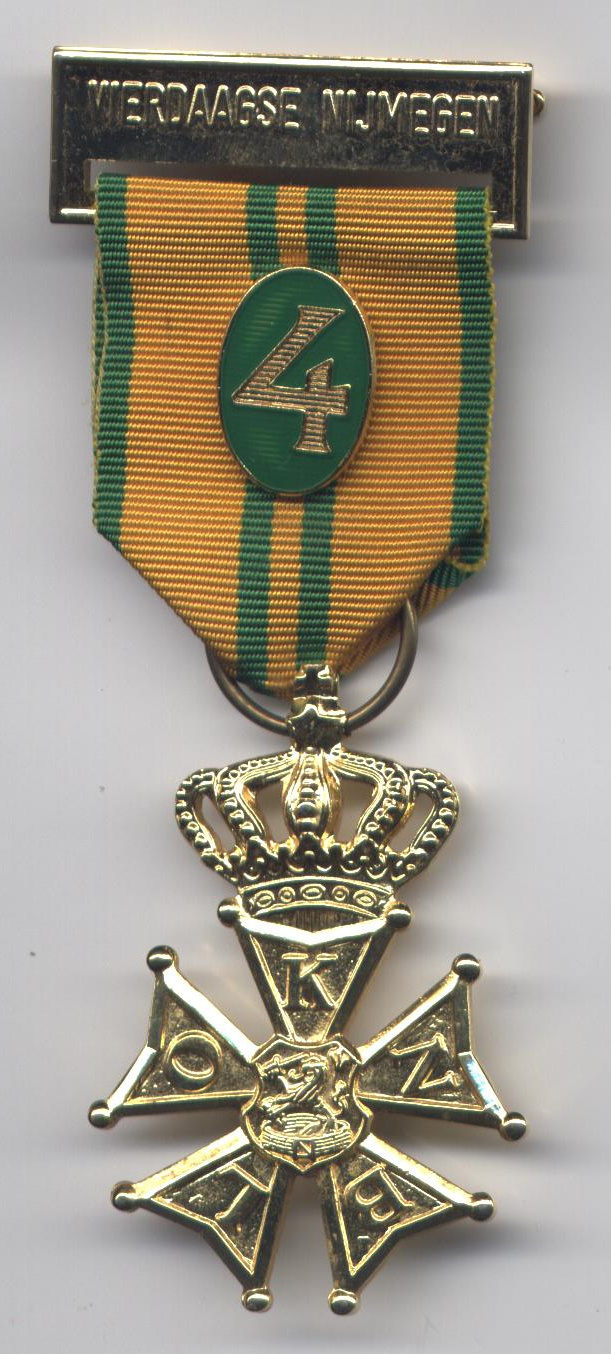
Cross in bronze, 2nd year. 1977–2009

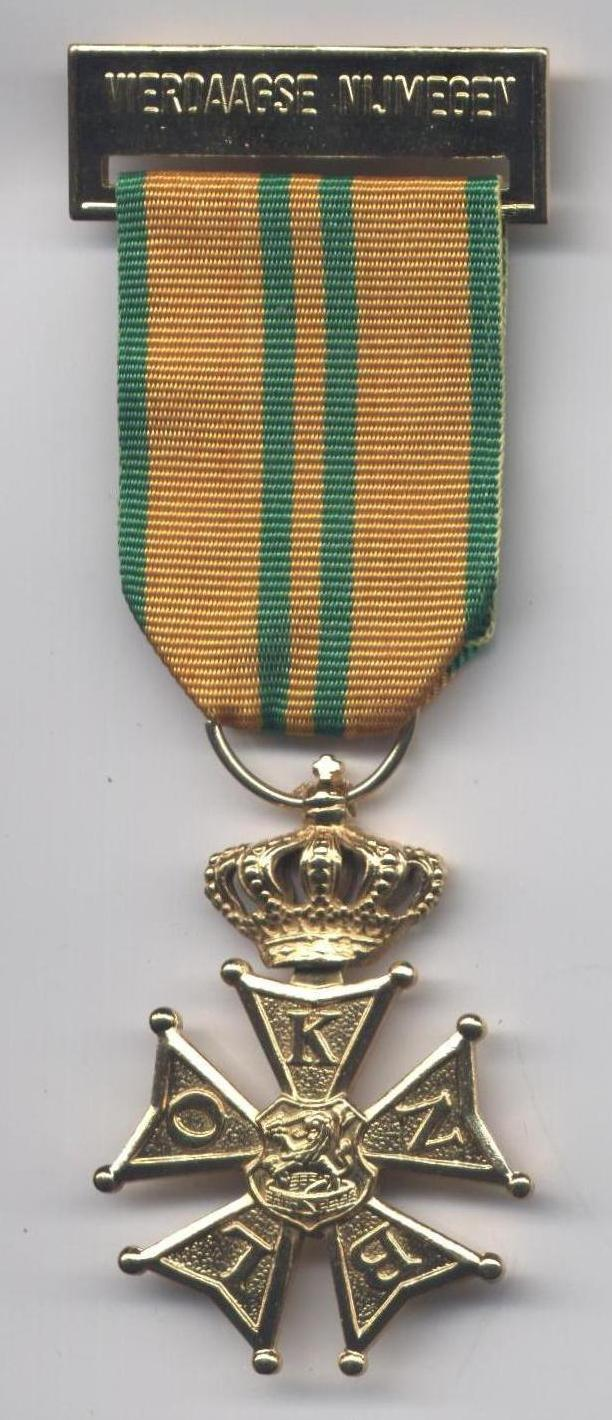
Cross in bronze, 2nd year. From 2010

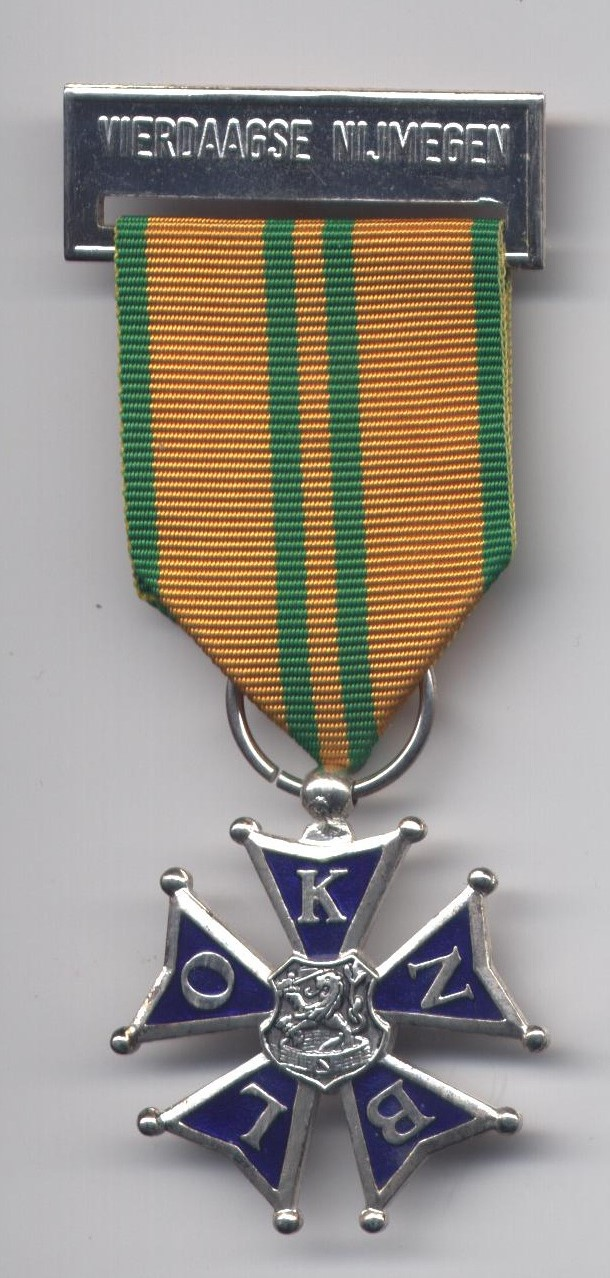
Cross in silver, 5th year. From 1959

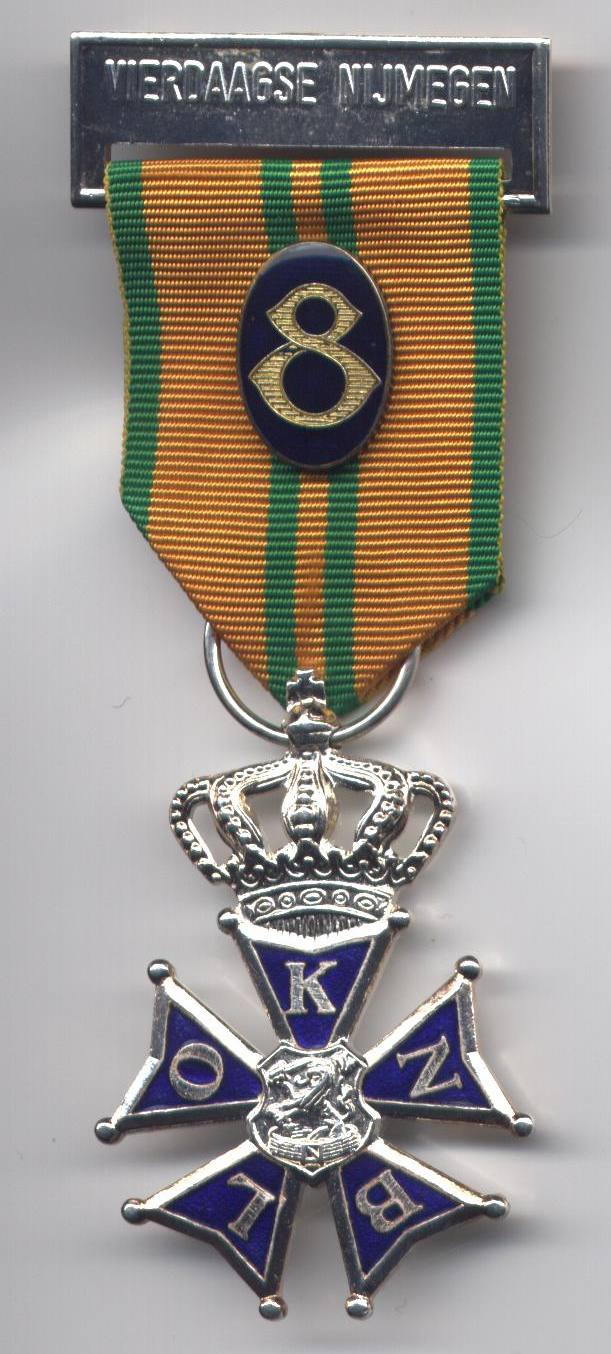
Cross in silver, 6th year. 1977–2009

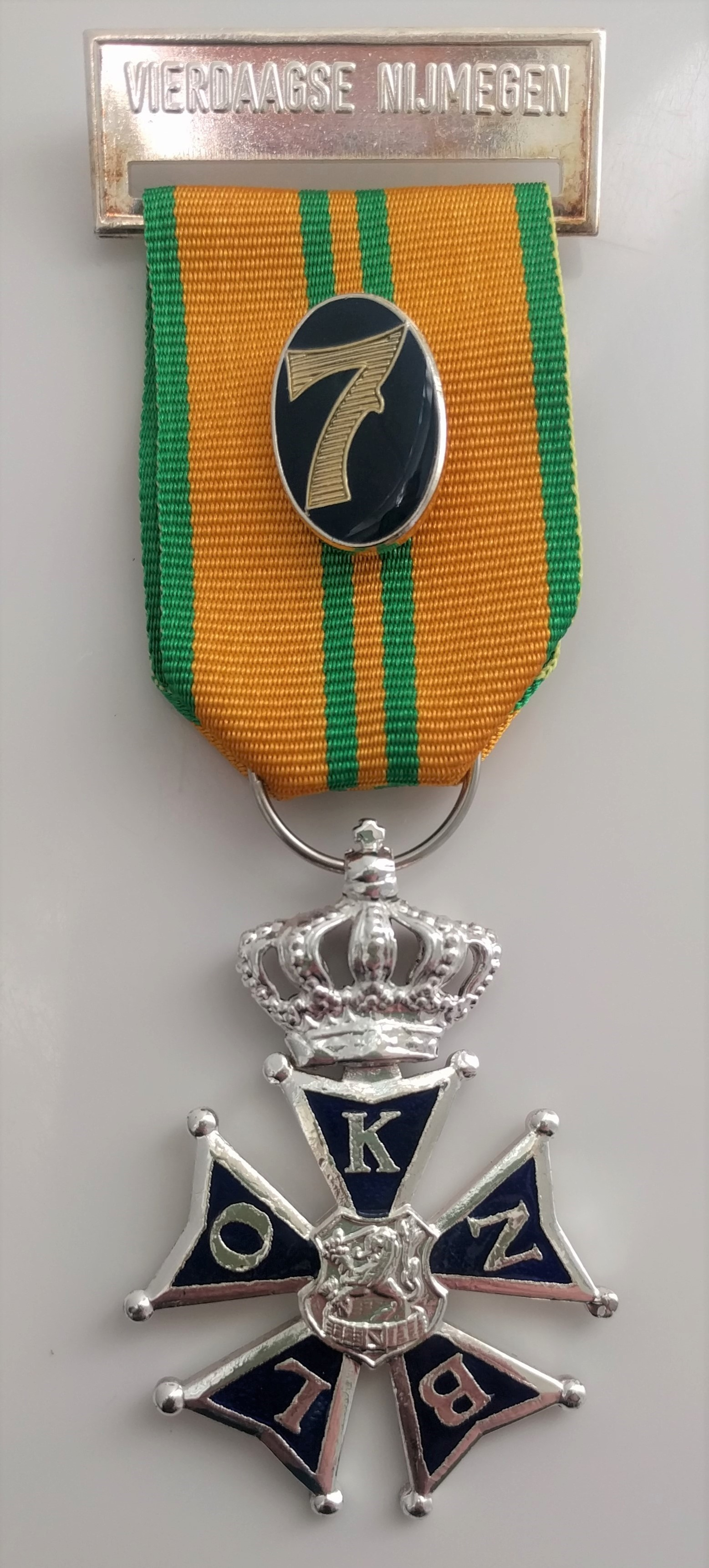
Cross in silver, From 2010

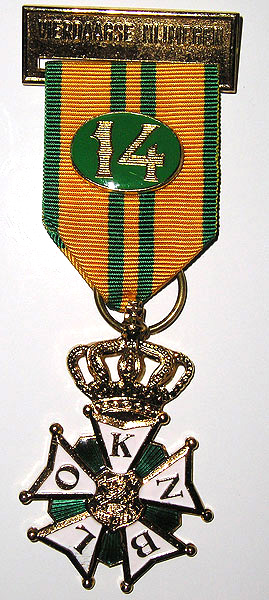
Cross in gold, 11th year. 1977–2009

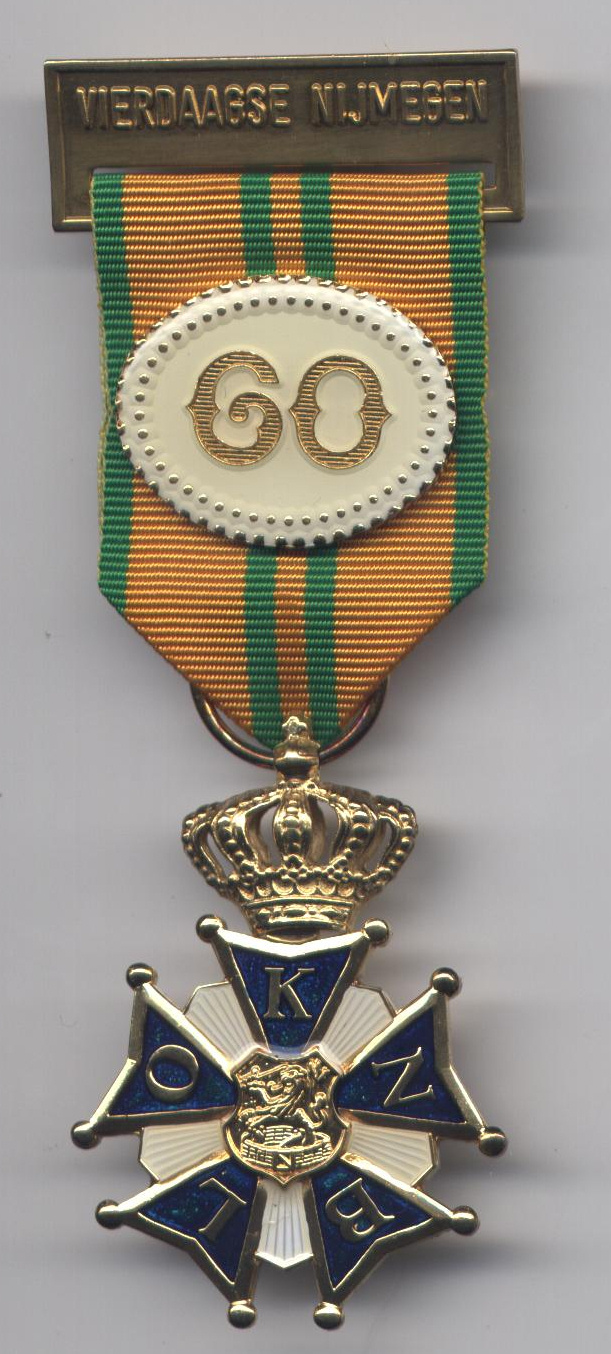
Cross in gold, 60th year. From 2007

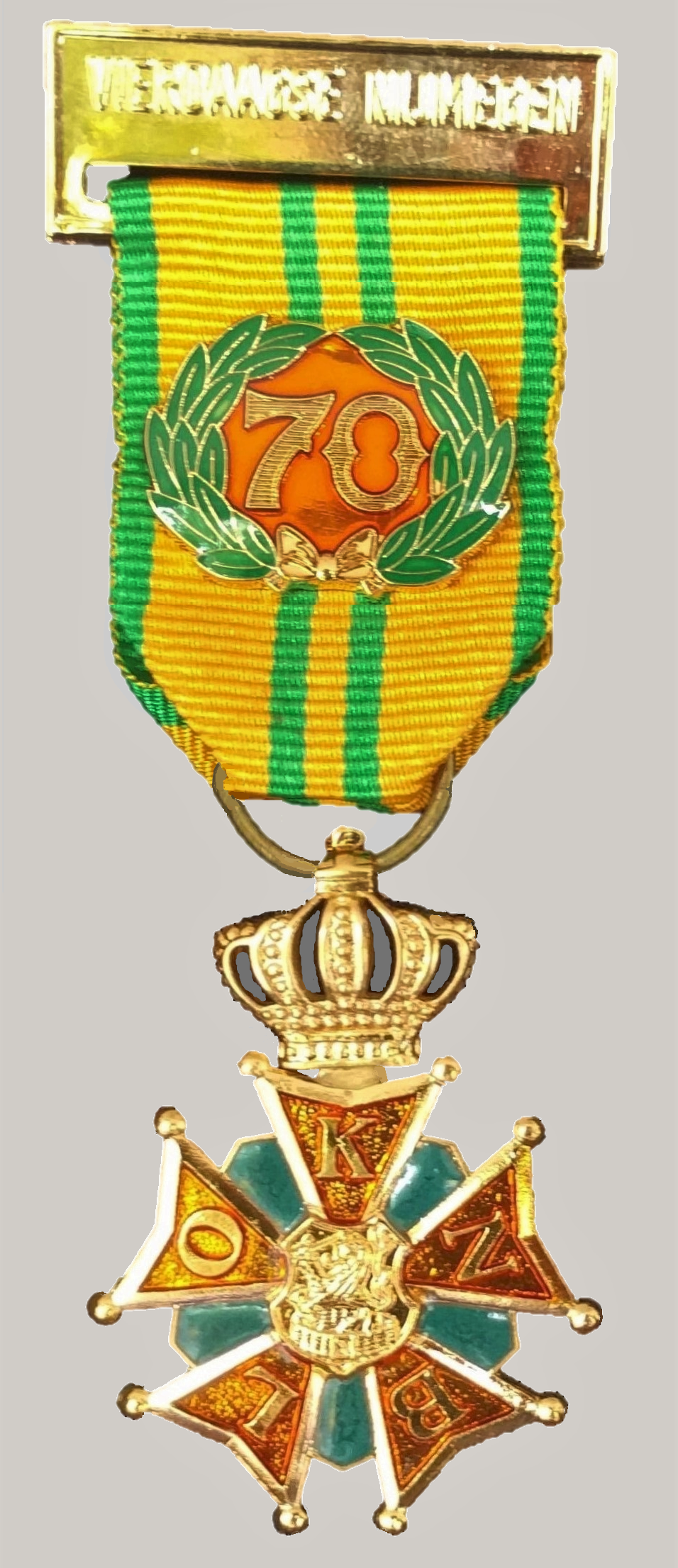
Cross in gold, 70th year. From 2017

== Related awards ==
- Group Medal of the Four Day Marches
- Orderly Medal of the Four Day Marches
