= Will Hinchcliff =

American gridiron football player (born 1969)

Profile
- Position: Wide receiver / kick returner

Personal information
- Born: September 13, 1969 (age 57); Trenton, New Jersey, U.S.
- Listed height: 6 ft 0 in (1.83 m)
- Listed weight: 224 lb (102 kg)

Career history
- BC Lions (1992–1993); Saskatchewan Roughriders (1995); London Monarchs (1996); Ottawa Rough Riders (1996)

Other information
- Sports career
- Country: New Zealand
- Sport: Track and field
- Event: Long jump

Sports achievements and titles
- National finals: New Zealand champion (1989, 1990)

John William Hinchcliff (born September 13, 1969) is an American former football wide receiver in the Canadian Football League and the World League of American Football. A sprinter and a long jumper, Hinchcliff represented New Zealand in the 1990 Commonwealth Games in the long jump. However, he soon tested positive for steroid use and was suspended for two years. In addition to athletics, he also represented New Zealand in international bobsled competition. Hinchcliff is a nephew of former New Zealand Prime Minister Sir Geoffrey Palmer.
