= 2010 Isle of Man Parish Walk =

Racewalking event on the Isle of Man

2010 Isle of Man Parish Walk was held on 26–27 June 2010 starting at 08:00 hours at the National Sports Centre, King George V Park, Douglas, Isle of Man. The race a racewalking event held under IAAF Category B Event rules follows an 85.00 miles (136.79 km) traditional route visiting each of the islands 17 parish churches with a time-limit of 24 hours to complete the course.

The 2010 Parish Walk was won by Jock Waddington in 15 hours, 18 minutes and 6 seconds to complete a hat-trick of wins on the event. The first female finisher was Susan Moore in 12th place in a time of 17 hours, 44 minutes and 13 seconds. The total number of classified finishers for the 85-mile course was 133 walkers from a record total of 1,710 entries.

== Results ==
Rank	Athlete	Time	Notes
1st place, gold medalist(s)	Jock Waddington	15:18:06	Finish
2nd place, silver medalist(s)	Vinny Lynch	15:57:42	Finish
3rd place, bronze medalist(s)	Michael George	16:04:07	Finish
4	Richard Gerrard	16:13:27	Finish
5	Terry Moffat	16:24:52	Finish
6	Richard Spenceley	16:51:34	Finish
7	Tony Okley	16:53:50	Finish
8	Michael Readshaw	17:00:55	Finish
9	Andy Green	17:12:37	Finish
10	Ray Pitts	17:16:51	Finish

PB – Personal Best / SB – Season Best / NR – National Record / DNF – Did Not Finish / DQ – Disqualified / DNS – Did Not Start
