= Ligia Grozav =

Romanian high jumper

Personal information
- Born: 26 January 1994 (age 32)

Sport
- Country: Romania
- Sport: Athletics
- Event: High jump

Achievements and titles
- Personal best: High jump: 1.87 m (2011)

Ligia Grozav married Bara (born 26 January 1994) is a Romanian high jumper, who won an individual gold medal at the Youth World Championships.

== Biography ==
Ligia Damaris (Grozav) married Valentin Bara on 9 August 2014. She lives in Oradea with her husband and her daughter.
