= Thalia Charalambous =

Cypriot long-distance runner (born 1989)

Personal information
- Born: 26 August 1989 (age 36)

Sport
- Country: Cyprus
- Sport: Long-distance running

Thalia Charalambous (born 26 August 1989) is a Cypriot long-distance runner. She competed in the women's half marathon at the 2020 World Athletics Half Marathon Championships held in Gdynia, Poland. She also competed at the 2022 Mediterranean Games held in Oran, Algeria.
