= Royal Dutch League for Physical Education =

Defunct Dutch sports association

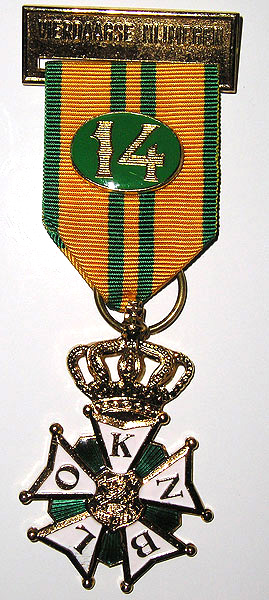
Four Days' March Cross (14th completion) with the initials KNBLO

The Royal Dutch League for Physical Education (Koninklijke Nederlandse Bond voor Lichamelijke Opvoeding or KNBLO-NL) was a Dutch sports association, focused on sporting and recreational walking. It existed from 1908 until 2015. After a merger with the Netherlands Sports-Walking Organisation (Wandelsportorganisatie Nederland) in 2004 it was renamed the KNBLO Wandelsportorganisatie Nederland. On 1 January 2015 it and the Dutch Sports-Walking League (Nederlandse Wandelsport Bond or NWB) merged to form the Royal Walking League of the Netherlands (Koninklijke Wandel Bond Nederland or KWBN). The resulting organisation has 100,000 members and is a major sports association within the NOC*NSF.

The League was established on 3 April 1908 as the Dutch League for Physical Education (Nederlandsche Bond voor Lichamelijke Opvoeding or NBvLO) by baron Frits van Tuyll van Serooskerken, lieutenant-colonel W.F.K. Bischoff van Heemskerck and the sports pioneer W.J.H. (Pim) Mulier. van Serooskerken also served as the League's chairman from 1910 to 1912.

It had about 35,000 members and was a member of the NOC*NSF, which was first formed as a product of it. It was also affiliated to the Stichting Landelijk Wandelplatform-LAW. More than 575 walking clubs were associated with the League. It organised about 1,000 walking events a year, ranging from small-scale long-distance tours under 100 kilometres to large scale events such as the International Four Days Marches Nijmegen, the Red Cross 'Bloesemtocht' and the annual Avondvierdaagse. Its associations and volunteers also maintained a growing number of permanent walking routes.
