= Parish Walk =

Walking event on the Isle of Man

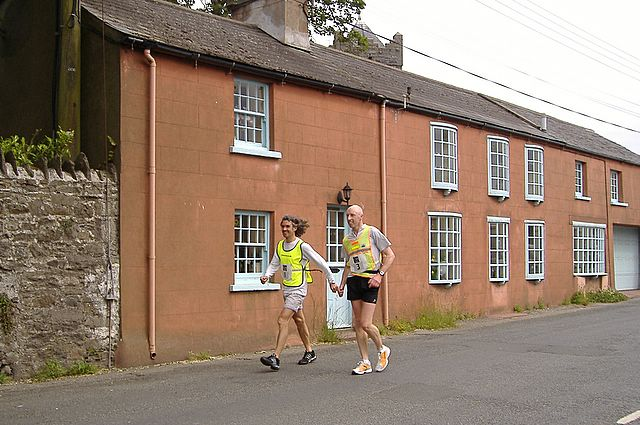
Parish Walk on 2006.

The Parish Walk (sponsored by Manx Telecom since 2012, previously known as the Clerical Medical Parish Walk until 2009, then Scottish Widows Parish walk up to 2011) is a walking race that takes place on the Isle of Man each year usually on the weekend nearest to the Northern Summer solstice. It is the biggest walking event on the island.

The Parish Walk is so called because the route passes through all of the island's seventeen parishes, covering a total distance of 85 miles (137 km). Originally, walkers had to touch the door of each of the seventeen parish churches, which are all still visited but nowadays electronic timing chips are worn. A time limit of 24 hours is given, and there are cut-off times for reaching each stage.

Only a small proportion of walkers are expected to complete the full distance each year. Walkers may drop out at any of the stages, which correspond to each parish, with an official time and distance. The entry fee for the 2018 race was quoted at £40 or less dependent on discounts.

== History ==
The challenge was seeded by a Manx Sun newspaper article in 1852 entitled "A summer's day Journey", recording a journey taken by the then-Coroner, John Cannel, who covered 90 miles in 15 hours on horseback. The following year he followed a similar route, only this time on foot, visiting each of the island's 17 parishes.

It was not until 1913 that the event took its current form when the Parish Walking Match was organised by the Isle of Man Times and the Manx Sporting Club. The outbreak of war interrupted the event, and it was revived in 1923.

== Fundraising ==
It is believed that the Parish Walk may be the largest annual fundraising event in the island. However, as each participant is left to raise money themselves and for a charity of their own choice, no figures have ever been compiled. Participation involves a chargeable entry fee.

== Course ==
The Parish Walk starts at 8am at the National Sports Centre in Douglas. From the start line of the athletics track, competitors must complete one lap of the 400 metre track before leaving through the Marathon gates, negotiating the TT Access Road before doubling back to the first of the Parish Churches (Braddan), proceeding in the following order;

- Braddan Church (2 miles)
- Marown Church (4.5 miles)
- Santon Church (11 miles)
- Malew Church (15 miles)
- Arbory Church (17 miles)
- Rushen Church (19 miles)
- Patrick Church (30.5 miles)
- St German's Church, Peel (32.5 miles)
- Kirk Michael Church (39 miles)
- Ballaugh Church (42 miles)
- Jurby Church (45 miles)
- Bride Church (52.5 miles)
- Andreas Church (55.5 miles)
- Lezayre Church (61.5 miles)
- Maughold Church (67 miles)
- Lonan Church (78.5 miles)
- Onchan Church (83 miles)
- Finish, Douglas (85 miles)

The finishing line is on Douglas promenade by the War Memorial at the bottom of Broadway.

== Past winners ==
| Year | Men's Winner | Time | Women's Winner | Time | Overall Position |
|---|---|---|---|---|---|
| 1960 | Alfred Mcvitie | 14:07:30 | | | |
| 1961 | Henry Harvey | 17:10:17 | | | |
| 1962 | Henry Harvey | 16:25:40 | | | |
| 1963 | Joe Brown | 17:04:09 | | | |
| 1964 | Henry Harvey | 16:21:06 | | | |
| 1965 | No race | | | | |
| 1966 | No race | | | | |
| 1967 | Albert Johnson | 15:54:51 | | | |
| 1968 | Leece Kneale | 16:05:52 | | | |
| 1969 | Ian Hodgkinson | 17:11:25 | | | |
| 1970 | Dudley Seddon | 17:21:49 | | | |
| 1971 | Graham Young | 15:43:12 | | | |
| 1972 | Derek Harrison | 16:19:15 | | | |
| 1973 | Derek Harrison | 16:36:04 | | | |
| 1974 | John Dowling | 16:40:07 | | | |
| 1975 | Ted Warner | 18:49:52 | | | |
| 1976 | John Cannell | 17:28:12 | | | |
| 1977 | Steve Gardner | 19:11:01 | | | |
| 1978 | Murray Lambden | 16:19:37 | | | |
| 1979 | Derek Harrison | 15:20:51 | | | |
| 1980 | Derek Harrison | 16:13:10 | | | |
| 1981 | John Cannell | 16:15:11 | | | |
| 1982 | John Cannell | 15:59:33 | | | |
| 1983 | John Cannell | 16:31:38 | | | |
| 1984 | Derek Harrison | 16:10:17 | | | |
| 1985 | Willie Corkill | 16:29:31 | | | |
| 1986 | Willie Corkill | 17:03:45 | | | |
| 1987 | Willie Corkill | 16:58:33 | | | |
| 1988 | Martin Lambden | 17:12:01 | | | |
| 1989 | Charlie Weston | 18:17:55 | | | |
| 1990 | Gordon Vale | 17:55:10 | | | |
| 1991 | Charlie Weston | 17:46:58 | | | |
| 1992 | Graham Young | 16:38:27 | | | |
| 1993 | John Cannell | 16:11:11 | | | |
| 1994 | John Cannell | 16:13:46 | | | |
| 1995 | Brian Ashwell | 16:37:47 | Jill Green | 20:29:08 | 7th |
| 1996 | Lee Cain | 17:26:29 | Winnie Callister | 22:59:02 | 17th |
| 1997 | Chris Flint | 17:36:40 | Jill Green | 18:39:57 | 4th |
| 1998 | Richard Brown | 15:59:44 | Sandra Brown | 16:16:36 | 2nd |
| 1999 | Chris Flint | 17:07:46 | Karen Marie Brogger | 17:48:40 | 2nd |
| 2000 | Peter Kaneen | 16:59:54 | Karen Marie Brogger | 18:04:35 | 4th |
| 2001 | Robbie Callister | 16:59:27 | Rosemarie Crellin | 20:04:54 | 15th |
| 2002 | Robbie Callister | 16:34:30 | Rosemarie Crellin | 18:34:07 | 5th |
| 2003 | Peter Kaneen | 15:26:07 | Rosemarie Crellin | 17:12:19 | 4th |
| 2004 | Robbie Callister | 15:26:31 | Sue Biggart | 16:48:32 | 3rd |
| 2005 | Robbie Callister | 15:24:24 | Sue Biggart | 16:53:54 | 3rd |
| 2006 | Sean Hands | 14:47:36 | Sue Biggart | 16:23:14 | 4th |
| 2007 | Robbie Callister | 15:36:47 | Sue Biggart | 16:49:46 | 7th |
| 2008 | Jock Waddington | 15:44:43 | Sue Biggart | 16:42:09 | 5th |
| 2009 | Jock Waddington | 15:45:56 | Janice Quirk | 15:58:35 | 2nd |
| 2010 | Jock Waddington | 15:18:06 | Susan Moore | 17:44:13 | 12th |
| 2011 | Jock Waddington | 15:01:48 | Maureen Moffatt | 18:19:21 | 16th |
| 2012 | Vinny Lynch/Richard Gerrard | 14:42:32 | Sue Biggart | 17:03:53 | 8th |
| 2013 | Michael George | 14:44:49 | Janice Quirk | 16:16:39 | 6th |
| 2014 | Richard Gerrard | 15:15:20 | Janette Morgan | 16:48:14 | 6th |
| 2015 | Richard Gerrard | 14:40:08 | Janette Morgan | 16:38:14 | 9th |
| 2016 | Richard Gerrard | 15:31:43 | Karen Chiarello | 16:00:03 | 3rd |
| 2017 | Liam Parker | 15:36:59 | Karen Chiarello | 15:53:44 | 2nd |
| 2018 | Walter Gerrard | 15:25:09 | Bernie Johnson | 17:37:17 | 12th |
| 2019 | Liam Parker | 15:44:06 | Emma Shilling | 17:47:09 | 7th |
| 2020 | No race | | | | |
| 2021 | Greg Rotheram | 15:23:41 | Samantha Bowden | 16:38:51 | 6th |
| 2022 | Paul Atherton | 15:23:39 | Samantha Bowden | 17:20:26 | |
| 2023 | Dean Morgan | 15:27:03 | Lorna Gleave | 17:27:31 | |

== Sponsorship ==
Clerical Medical sponsored the event from 1990 to 2009, until the takeover of HBOS (which owned Clerical Medical) by Lloyds TSB (which owned Scottish Widows) to form the Lloyds Banking Group. As a result of the takeover the event was rebranded as the Scottish Widows Parish Walk. This sponsorship ran up to and including the 2011 event. On 12 October 2011 the organisers announced that Manx Telecom would be taking over sponsorship. Manx Telecom had provided the on-line timing systems for previous years but the 2012 event was their first as title sponsors.

== Organisation ==
The Parish Walk is organised by Manx Harriers, the largest Athletics club in the Isle of Man. A sub-committee of the club organises the event.

== Events ==
There are four main races within the Parish Walk - The Mass race, Ladies Race, Team Race and Under 21 Race.

=== The mass race ===
In 2017, the Mass Race was won by Liam Parker in hot conditions in a time of 15:36:59. At 26, Parker was the youngest winner for two decades. He was followed by Karen Chiarello in second place and Adam Killip was third overall and second man to complete the 85 mile course.

=== Ladies race ===
The Trophy for the Best Lady Finisher went to Karen Chiarello in 2017. She completed the 85 miles in a time of 15:53:44, placing her 2nd overall. She broke the women's course record (set in 2009 by Janice Quirk) by 4 minutes 51 seconds. The second woman to finish, Karen Lawrie was in 4th place overall.

=== U21 race ===
The event is open to anyone with an age of at least 18 and under 21 on the day of the race, and finishes at Peel (32.5 miles).

The 2016 U21 winners were Alex Eaton (Men - 06:16:29) and Rebecca Greatbatch (Ladies - 06:58:40).

=== Team race ===
Teams may consist of up to four walkers but each team may only have two members who have previously completed the full 85 miles. The winning team is that with the highest total mileage. The total time is used as a tie-breaker should more than one team have the same total mileage. In 2016 the overall team winners were Organ Donation Isle of Man (Richard Gerrard 1st, David Walker 2nd, James Quirk 15th, Paul Clark 113th). Family with the hat on (Maureen Moffatt =98th, June Melvin =98th, Jessica Hatton =98th, Rebecca Moffatt =98th) were the quickest of the ladies teams. The 2018 ladies winners were 4SW, made up of Jessica Kitchin, Nikki Taylor, Thenral Anand and Sharon Blackley.
