= International Four Days Marches Nijmegen =

Marching event

International Four Days Marches Nijmegen Internationale Vierdaagse Afstandsmarsen Nijmegen
- Flag of the Four Days Marches

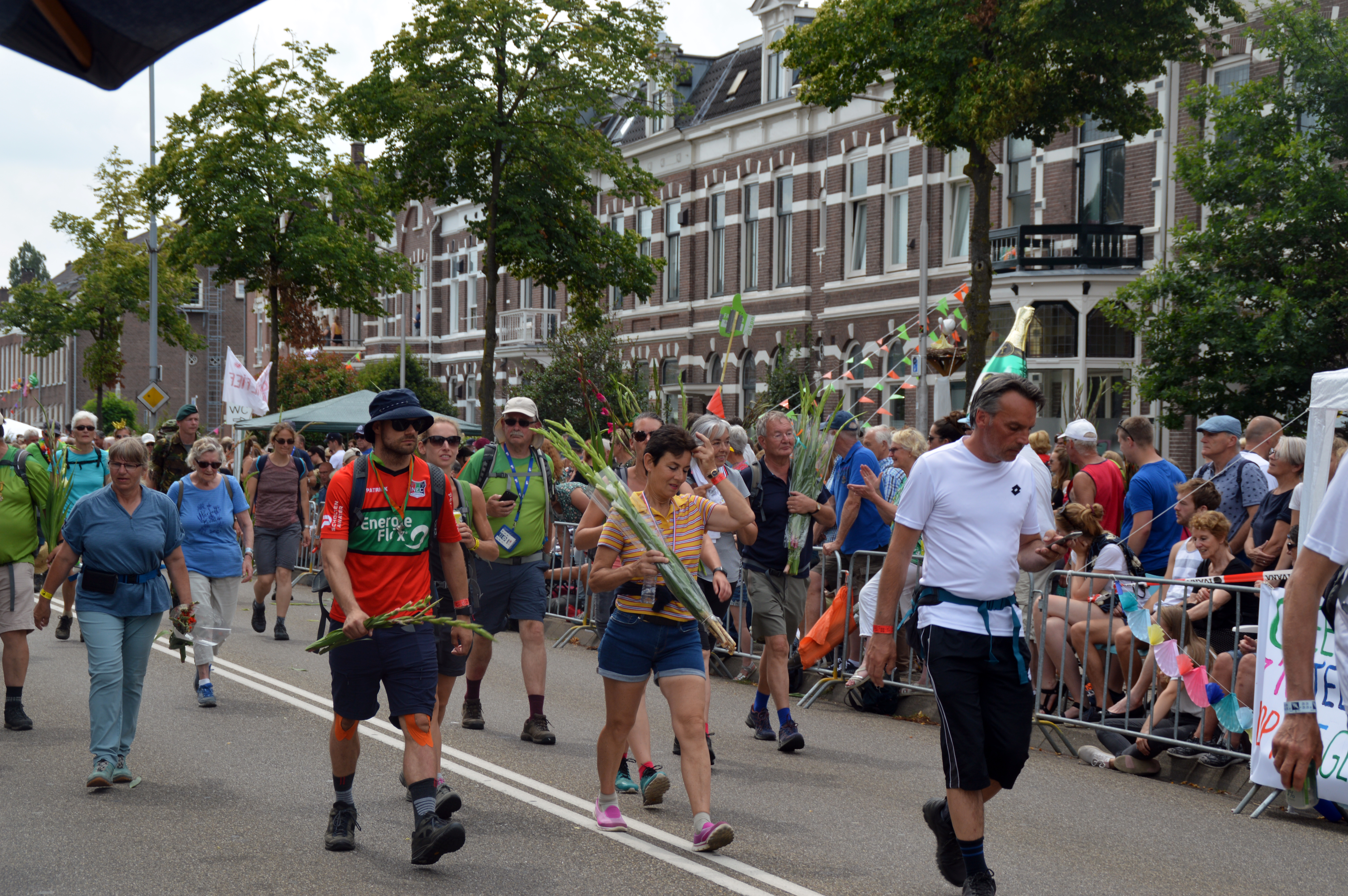
- Arrival of participants in 2019
- Status: Active
- Genre: Marching event
- Frequency: Annually
- Locations: Nijmegen and surroundings
- Country: Netherlands
- Website: www.4daagse.nl

The International Four Day Marches Nijmegen (Dutch: Internationale Vierdaagse Afstandsmarsen Nijmegen, pronounced [ˈɪntərnɑ(t)ɕoːˌnaːlə ˈviːrˌdaːxsə ˈʔɑfstɑntsˌmɑrsə ˈnɛimeːɣə(n)]) is the largest and oldest military sporting event in the world, with tens of thousands of participants from across the worlds militaries. It is organised every year in Nijmegen, Netherlands in mid-July as a means of promoting sport, exercise and a display of military professionalism. Military competitors will pack march 40km in uniform carrying at least 10kg of dead weight. Conversely, civilians participants, who can march although not compete, walk 30 km (19 mi), 40 km (25 mi) or 50 km (31 mi) daily, depending on their age and gender. successful competitors on completion, receive a royally approved medal (Vierdaagsekruis). Although the event is now demographically predominantly civilian, it is still inherently and culturally a military event.

== Summary ==
The Vierdaagse (pronounced [ˌviːrˈdaːxsə], lit. 'four-day event') is an annual walk that has taken place since 1909. Based at Nijmegen since 1925, it now takes place in the third week of July. In 2016 it celebrated the 100th edition (reflecting that the marches were curtailed during the two world wars). Originally a military event with a few civilians, it now is a mainly civilian event. Numbers have risen in recent years, with over 40,000 taking part annually, including about 5,000 military, and is the world's largest walking event and military sporting event. Due to possible congestion on the route, since 2004 the organisers have limited the number of participants. Many take part every year, including several who have taken part in over 60 annual marches. The record is held by Bert van der Lans, who completed his seventy-first march in 2018, at the age of 86.

Each day of the marches is named for the biggest town on the daily route. Tuesday is the day of Elst, Wednesday the day of Wijchen, Thursday the day of Groesbeek and Friday the day of Cuijk. The routes always remain the same unless there is a specific need to change. This happened in 2007 when the walkers went along the Waalkade, beside the River Waal, on Wednesday for the first time due to congestion on the original route. The 2006 march was the first to be cancelled since World War II, after extreme heat caused thousands of drop-outs and two deaths during the first day's march. Following the 2006 cancellation, it was decided that the organising committee would adjust the start time/distance/finish time to manage the event, instead of outright cancellation. The 2016 centenary event responded to unusually hot conditions by adjusting starting times and/or increasing the valid finishing time to reflect the difficulty of the course. Due to the coronavirus pandemic, both the 2020 and 2021 Vierdaagse events were cancelled.

On Wednesdays many of the marchers dress in pink in honor of Roze Woensdag. An LGBTQ+ event to celebrate the freedoms, and to acknowledge that there is still room for improvement when it comes to acceptance and equality of LGBTQ+ people.

On Fridays of the event, as participants near the finish, the public presents walkers with gladioli, a symbol of victory since Roman times, when gladiators were likewise showered with these flowers. The entry into the city and towards the finish, along the St. Annastraat, is for that reason called Via Gladiola during the event. As far as a week ahead of that Friday, people will reserve spaces alongside the Via Gladiola by placing chairs and even couches. The finish is broadcast on Dutch television.

== Awards ==
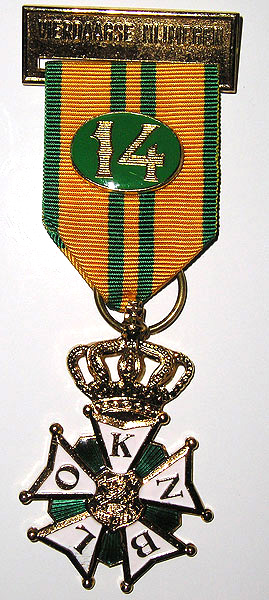
The gold cross with 14 times participation pin

The marching event has three types of awards:

- Cross for the Four Day Marches (Dutch: Vierdaagsekruis): awarded to participants who complete all four days. The medal is an official Dutch decoration that can be worn on a Dutch military uniform. Its full name is "Cross for demonstrated marching skill", defined by Royal Decree on 6 October 1909. Each year a walker receives a specific medal in bronze, silver or gold, with or without a crown, as well as ribbon numbers of varying design, to denote the number of times the event has been completed.
- Group Medal of the Four Day Marches
- Orderly Medal of the Four Day Marches (not an official award since 2017)

== History ==
Canadian participant Xavier talks to a WW II veteran involved in the liberation of Nijmegen (2019)

=== Early years ===
In April 1908 the Dutch League for Physical Education, (Nederlandsche Bond Voor Lichamelijke Opvoeding, or NBVLO) was established to promote participation in physical activities across the Netherlands, including organising sports events. In September 1909 the NBVLO organised the first Vierdaagse. Planned primarily as a military training event, fifteen separate four-day routes were prepared across the country, each route totalling 140–150 km (87–93 mi). Four of the routes were however cancelled at short notice, three due to an outbreak of cholera in Rotterdam and one due to poor road conditions. In total, 306 soldiers and ten civilians took part. Military participants who completed all four days received the newly instituted Vierdaagse Cross.

From 1910 the Vierdaagse became an annual event, based in a different town each year, although mobilisation during World War I meant that no marches took place in 1914 or 1915. In 1919 the first woman completed the route. In 1925 the event was held in Nijmegen, and from then this became the permanent centre for the event.

With Amsterdam hosting the Olympic Games, in 1928 the Four Days Marches became international, with teams taking part from Germany, Great Britain and Norway. Non-Dutch participation continued, with the first Swiss group taking part in 1933. From the 1920s the numbers of walkers increased significantly. In 1920 under 500 had taken part, compared with 1,155 in 1928. In 1931 numbers exceeded 2,000 for the first time, with over 3,000 in 1935 and over 4,000 in 1937. The increase was mainly due to greater civilian participation, civilians outnumbering servicemen in all marches from 1932.

After a successful trial event in 1935, four-day marches were held annually at various locations across the Dutch East Indies between 1936 and 1939. Organised by the Dutch Indies Athletic Union under the auspices of the NBVLO, these events adhered to the same regulations as the Nijmegen event, with successful participants receiving the same awards, including the Vierdaagse Cross, and the Group Medal.

The 1940 Vierdaagse was cancelled after the German invasion, with a local Nijmegen walking club organising an emergency (nood in Dutch) Four-Days March in August 1940. About 1,000 walkers took part each day, rising to over 2,000 on the final day, with many participants attending from across the country. In 1941 the NBVLO planned a vierdaagse based in Nijmegen. Preparation for the July event included publication of the official rules, which forbade any political display, including uniforms and flags. In spite of this, the march was banned by the German authorities. A number of small scale four-day walking events did however take place in 1941, including a number of less formal evening walks. With unauthorised gatherings increasingly restricted, no further events were organised before the end of the war.

=== Since 1945 ===
Despite Nijmegen suffering considerable war damage, the Vierdaagse recommenced in Nijmegen in 1946 with over 4,000 participants.

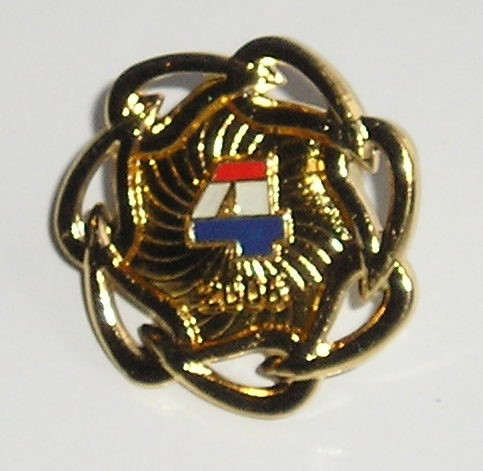
Badge awarded to all who completed the first day of the 2006 event

The popularity of the Four Days Marches continued to increase, breaking the 10,000 barrier in 1954. The participation in 1967 of Prince Claus, husband of heir-apparent Beatrix, helped to boost the event's popularity yet further, with over 20,000 taking part in 1982 and 30,000 by 1988. The number of participants now regularly exceeds 40,000. Due to this growth, since 2004 there has been an upper limit on the number taking part, with a record 48,986 registering for the 100th March in 2016. This increase has been boosted by a rising number attending from across the world. In 2019 6,347 non-Dutch walkers from 73 countries took part.

In 1972 hot weather led to a shortening of the distances by 10 km (6.2 mi) each day. In 2006, the event was again affected by extreme heat, when it was cancelled after the first day after two participants died and many others required medical attention. Given the hot weather forecast for the following days, the organisers decided to cancel the final three days of the walk, with a special badge awarded to participants instead of the cross.

On 17 July 2014, flight MH17 was shot down, with 192 people from the Netherlands onboard. In memory of the crash, no music was played on the last day of the marches, and the festivities were subdued. The 100th Four Days Marches took place in July 2016, celebrated by numerous side events, including an optional daily 55 km (34 mi) route—the maximum official distance until 1967.

Both the 2020 and the 2021 events were cancelled due to the COVID-19 pandemic. In both years, an Alternatieve Vierdaagse was organised, with walkers completing the four days in their local area, thereby avoiding large groups. Even though the full Nijmegen March was organised in 2022, the Alternatieve Vierdaagse continued for those who did not take part in the main march. These walks did not count towards the Vierdaagse Cross, although participants could buy a souvenir medal.

In 2022, due to extreme heat with predicted peaks of 39 degrees Celsius, the first day of the March was cancelled, with the 2022 march becoming a three-day event.

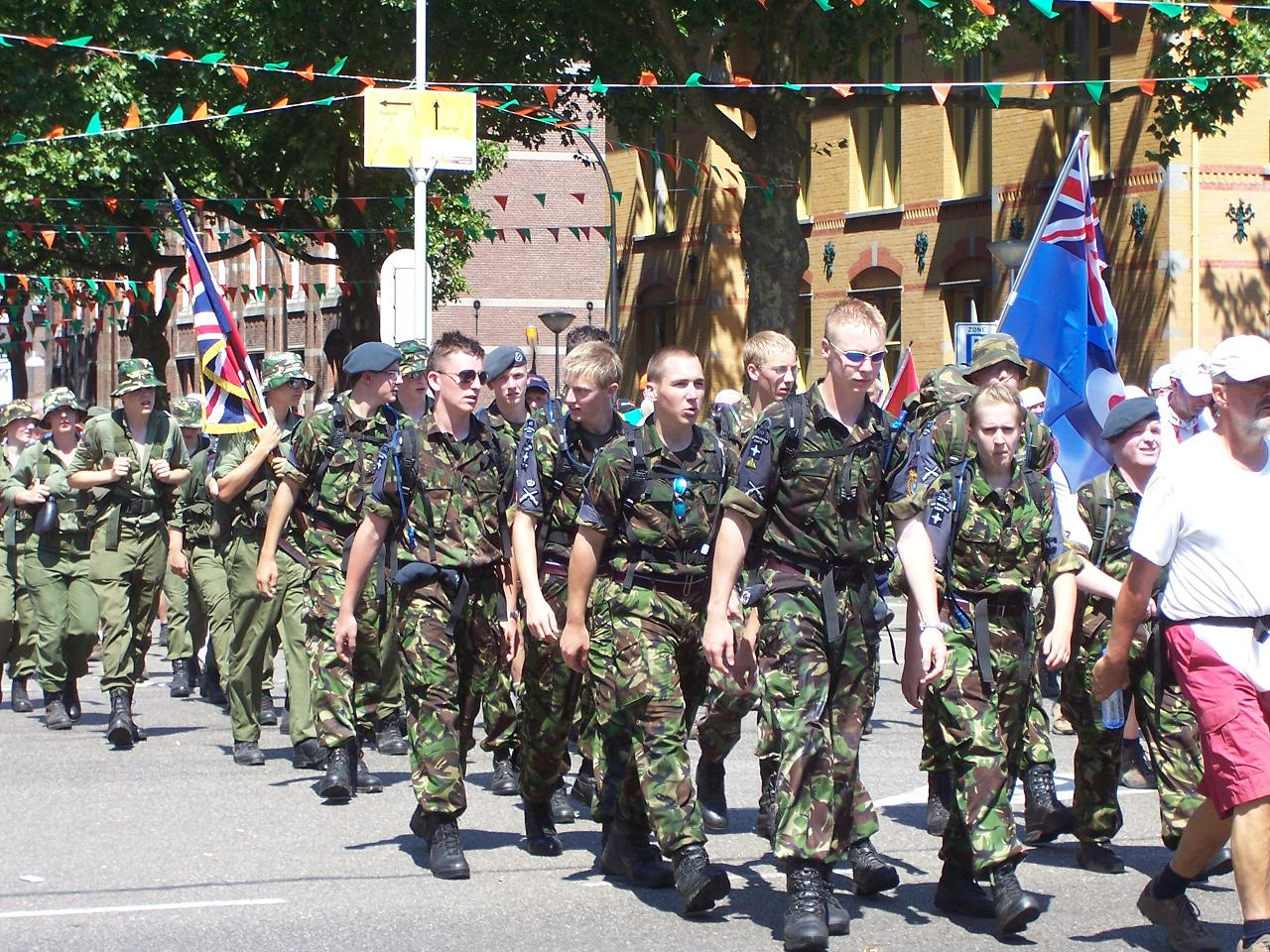
A team from South & East Midlands Wing, Air Training Corps, 2006

=== Organisation ===
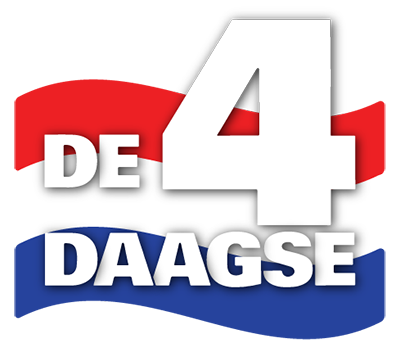
Logo until 2026

Logo from 2027

Following an agreement between the Royal Dutch League for Physical Education and the Tax and Customs Administration, a separate foundation was established on 1 July 2002: the International Four Day Marches Nijmegen Foundation (Stichting DE 4DAAGSE), which has been responsible for organising the event since the 86th edition of the event in 2002.

From 2002 to 2026, a red, white and blue logo was used, featuring the slogan ‘Walk of the World’. Following the 2026 Four Days Marches, a new logo was announced, which will be used from 2027 onwards, and which is based on the colours of the traditional flag of the Four Days Marches.

=== Military competition ===
The event is still formally a military competition. It sees section level teams, known as 'detachments', race each other with the quickest team winning the event. Originally primarily a military training event for the Dutch infantry, since 1928 the Vierdaagse has attracted armed forces personnel from other countries, when Germany and Norway sent army teams. Military teams increased greatly after 1945. The U.S. Army first took part in 1947, the United Kingdom in 1950 and Canada in 1952, with service contingents now also regularly travelling from Germany, Scandinavia, Switzerland and across NATO. In recent years military participants, including Dutch personnel, have numbered approximately five thousand, most marching in section teams. They are required to carry at least 10 kilogrammes of dead weight (if they are over 18 years of age), although this requirement can be waived when temperatures get too high, as happened in 2006 and the last day of the 2014 march. Military teams have their own route, (40 km), starting in the military camp Heumensoord, just south of Nijmegen, which is built for the event every year.

== Vierdaagsefeesten ==
During the week of the Vierdaagse the accompanying festivities (known as the Vierdaagsefeesten) always draw a large crowd. It is known as one of the biggest festivities in the Netherlands, drawing a crowd of nearly 1 million visitors. It starts on the Saturday before the marches, and ends on the Friday. There is free music during the week, and special events on each day, such as a firework display on Sunday night. Amongst the festivities is the annual rock festival, Valkhof Festival, that takes place every day during the Vierdaagsefeesten.

== Recent marches ==
Recent marches
Edition	Date	Participants	Finished	Dropped out	Dropped out percentage of starters
95th	19–22 July 2011	42,812	38,422	4,390	10.3%
96th	17–20 July 2012	41,472	38,144	3,328	8.0%
97th	16–19 July 2013	42,493	39,396	3,097	7.3%
98th	15–18 July 2014	43,013	39,910	3,103	7.2%
99th	21–24 July 2015	42,684	40,092	2,592	6.1%
100th	19–22 July 2016	47,166	42,557	4,609	9.8%
101st	18–21 July 2017	42,036	38,409	3,627	8.6%
102nd	17–20 July 2018	44,480	41,006	3,474	7.8%
103rd	16–19 July 2019	44,702	41,235	3,467	7.8%
—	21–24 July 2020	Cancelled	—	—	—
—	20–23 July 2021	Cancelled	—	—	—
104th	20–22 July 2022*	38,455	34,934	3,521	9.2%
105th	19–21 July 2023	43,363	39,019	4,344	10.0%
106th	16–19 July 2024	45,445	41,552	3,893	8.6%
107th	15–18 July 2025	45,539	42,777	2,762	6,1%
108th	21–24 July 2026	45,761	42,137	3,624	7.9%

* Due to predicted extreme heat on Tuesday 19 July, the first march day was cancelled, with the 2022 march becoming a three-day event.
