= 2012 Haarlem Baseball Week =

International baseball competition

Tournament details
- Country: Netherlands
- City: Haarlem
- Dates: 13–22 July
- Teams: 6

Final positions
- Champions: Cuba (5th title)
- Runners-up: Puerto Rico
- Third place: United States
- Fourth place: Netherlands

Tournament statistics
- Games played: 19
- Attendance: 58,325 (3,070 per game)

Awards
- MVP: (Cuba) Yulieski Gourriel

The 2012 Haarlem Baseball Week was an international baseball competition held at the Pim Mulier Stadium in Haarlem, the Netherlands from July 13–22, 2012. It was the 26th edition of the tournament.

In the final Cuba won over Puerto Rico, becoming champions for the fifth time.

== Teams ==
The following teams competed in the tournament.

Chinese Taipei^{1}	7th appearance
Cuba	13th appearance
Japan	12th appearance
Netherlands	Host nation
Puerto Rico	2nd appearance
United States	7th appearance

^1 Chinese Taipei is the official IBAF designation for the team representing the state officially referred to as the Republic of China, more commonly known as Taiwan. (See also political status of Taiwan for details.)

USA Baseball sent their collegiate national team to the tournament.

== Group stage ==
=== Standings ===
Legend
Qualified for the semifinals
Did not qualify for the semifinals

Teams	W	L	Pct.	GB	R	RA
Puerto Rico	5	0	1.000	—	23	16
United States	4	1	.800	1	14	6
Cuba	3	2	.600	2	22	10
Netherlands	2	3	.400	3	23	12
Japan	1	4	.200	4	14	42
Chinese Taipei	0	5	.000	5	7	17

=== Game results ===
July 13, 2012	Japan	4 – 1	Chinese Taipei	Pim Mulier Stadium, Haarlem; Attendance: 1,750
July 13, 2012		Boxscore		Pim Mulier Stadium, Haarlem; Attendance: 1,750

July 13, 2012	Cuba	2 – 3	Puerto Rico	Pim Mulier Stadium, Haarlem; Attendance: 2,000
July 13, 2012		Boxscore		Pim Mulier Stadium, Haarlem; Attendance: 2,000

July 14, 2012	United States	4 – 1	Japan	Pim Mulier Stadium, Haarlem; Attendance: 3,250
July 14, 2012		Boxscore		Pim Mulier Stadium, Haarlem; Attendance: 3,250

July 14, 2012	Netherlands	2 – 4	Puerto Rico	Pim Mulier Stadium, Haarlem; Attendance: 4,200
July 14, 2012		Boxscore		Pim Mulier Stadium, Haarlem; Attendance: 4,200

July 15, 2012	Chinese Taipei	0 – 3	Netherlands	Pim Mulier Stadium, Haarlem; Attendance: 4,700
July 15, 2012		Boxscore		Pim Mulier Stadium, Haarlem; Attendance: 4,700

July 15, 2012	United States	5 – 2	Cuba	Pim Mulier Stadium, Haarlem; Attendance: 3,000
July 15, 2012		Boxscore		Pim Mulier Stadium, Haarlem; Attendance: 3,000

July 17, 2012	Cuba	2 – 1	Chinese Taipei	Pim Mulier Stadium, Haarlem; Attendance: 1,200
July 17, 2012		Boxscore		Pim Mulier Stadium, Haarlem; Attendance: 1,200

July 17, 2012	Puerto Rico	3 – 2	United States	Pim Mulier Stadium, Haarlem; Attendance: 2,400
July 17, 2012		Boxscore		Pim Mulier Stadium, Haarlem; Attendance: 2,400

July 17, 2012	Japan	3 – 18 (F/7)	Netherlands	Pim Mulier Stadium, Haarlem; Attendance: 3,300
July 17, 2012		Boxscore		Pim Mulier Stadium, Haarlem; Attendance: 3,300

July 18, 2012	Puerto Rico	7 – 5	Japan	Pim Mulier Stadium, Haarlem; Attendance: 825
July 18, 2012		Boxscore		Pim Mulier Stadium, Haarlem; Attendance: 825

July 18, 2012	United States	2 – 0	Chinese Taipei	Pim Mulier Stadium, Haarlem; Attendance: 3,500
July 18, 2012		Boxscore		Pim Mulier Stadium, Haarlem; Attendance: 3,500

July 19, 2012	Cuba	12 – 1 (F/8)	Japan	Pim Mulier Stadium, Haarlem; Attendance: 2,300
July 19, 2012		Boxscore		Pim Mulier Stadium, Haarlem; Attendance: 2,300

July 19, 2012	Netherlands	0 – 1	United States	Pim Mulier Stadium, Haarlem; Attendance: 4,600
July 19, 2012		Boxscore		Pim Mulier Stadium, Haarlem; Attendance: 4,600

July 20, 2012	Chinese Taipei	5 – 6	Puerto Rico	Pim Mulier Stadium, Haarlem; Attendance: 2,300
July 20, 2012		Boxscore		Pim Mulier Stadium, Haarlem; Attendance: 2,300

July 20, 2012	Netherlands	0 – 4	Cuba	Pim Mulier Stadium, Haarlem; Attendance: 4,200
July 20, 2012		Boxscore		Pim Mulier Stadium, Haarlem; Attendance: 4,200

== Final round ==
=== Semi finals ===
July 21, 2012	United States	3 – 5 (F/10)	Cuba	Pim Mulier Stadium, Haarlem; Attendance: 2,700
July 21, 2012		Boxscore		Pim Mulier Stadium, Haarlem; Attendance: 2,700

July 21, 2012	Puerto Rico	1 – 0	Netherlands	Pim Mulier Stadium, Haarlem; Attendance: 2,900
July 21, 2012		Boxscore		Pim Mulier Stadium, Haarlem; Attendance: 2,900

=== Bronze medal game ===
July 22, 2012	United States	4 – 3	Netherlands	Pim Mulier Stadium, Haarlem; Attendance: 4,500
July 22, 2012		Boxscore		Pim Mulier Stadium, Haarlem; Attendance: 4,500

=== Final ===
July 22, 2012	Cuba	4 – 2	Puerto Rico	Pim Mulier Stadium, Haarlem; Attendance: 4,700
July 22, 2012		Boxscore		Pim Mulier Stadium, Haarlem; Attendance: 4,700

== Final standings ==
Rk	Team
1	Cuba
Lost in Final
2	Puerto Rico
Lost in Semifinals
3	United States
4	Netherlands
Failed to qualify for Semifinals
5	Japan
6	Chinese Taipei

2012 Haarlem Baseball Week champions

Cuba
5th title

== Tournament awards ==
Award	Player
Most Valuable Player	(Cuba) Yulieski Gourriel (7 hits, 7 RBIs)
Best Pitcher	(United States) Marco Gonzales (1.20 ERA in 15 innings)
Best Defensive Player	(United States) D. J. Peterson (64 putouts)
Best Hitter	(Netherlands) Michael Duursma (.429)
Homerun King	(Japan) Yoshiki Eto (2)
Most Popular Player	(Chinese Taipei) Hsiao Po Ting
Press Award	(Cuba) Ariel Pestano
