= Dansby Swanson =

American baseball player (born 1994)

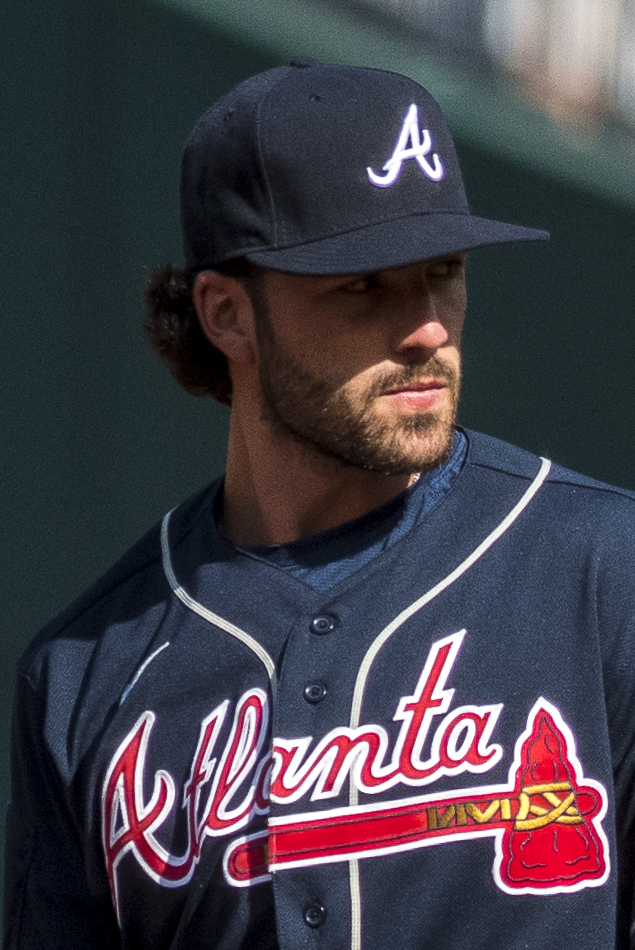
- Swanson with the Atlanta Braves in 2021

Chicago Cubs – No. 7
- Shortstop
- Born: February 11, 1994 (age 32); Kennesaw, Georgia, U.S.
- Bats: Right Throws: Right

MLB debut
- August 17, 2016, for the Atlanta Braves

MLB statistics (through 2026 season)
- Batting average: .247
- Home runs: 183
- Runs batted in: 703
- Stats at Baseball Reference

Teams
- Atlanta Braves (2016–2022); Chicago Cubs (2023–present)

Career highlights and awards
- 2× All-Star (2022, 2023); World Series champion (2021); 2× Gold Glove Award (2022, 2023)
Medals
Men's baseball
Representing United States
Haarlem Baseball Week
Gold medal – first place	2014 Haarlem	Team

James Dansby Swanson (born February 11, 1994) is an American professional baseball shortstop for the Chicago Cubs of Major League Baseball (MLB). He has previously played in MLB for the Atlanta Braves. The Arizona Diamondbacks selected him first overall in the 2015 MLB draft.

Born in Kennesaw, Georgia, to two former college athletes from Troy University, Swanson grew up supporting the Braves. He was a two-sport athlete at Marietta High School, earning the nickname "Three-point Swanson" for his basketball prowess. The Colorado Rockies selected him out of high school in the 38th round of the 2012 MLB draft, but Swanson opted not to sign, instead playing college baseball for the Vanderbilt Commodores. He missed most of his freshman season due to injuries, but had a breakout sophomore season as Vanderbilt's starting second baseman. The Commodores won their first-ever national championship that season, and Swanson was named the 2014 College World Series Most Outstanding Player. He shifted back to shortstop in 2015 and won the Brooks Wallace Award for the best collegiate baseball player at that position.

Swanson left Vanderbilt after the 2015 season to join the Diamondbacks and begin his professional baseball career. After one season in Arizona's farm system, he was traded to the Braves as part of a prospect package sent to Atlanta to acquire Shelby Miller. Swanson made his MLB debut in August 2016 and was the only Atlanta rookie named to the Braves' 2017 Opening Day roster, but he struggled both offensively and defensively and was sent back to Triple-A that July. Swanson's 2018 season was repeatedly derailed by wrist and hand injuries, and he missed a month of the 2019 season with a bruised heel. Healthy in 2020, Swanson set a career-high with a .274 batting average, and his 49 runs scored were third in MLB. He followed this with a championship title in the 2021 World Series, the Braves' first since 1995. He is married to Chicago Red Stars soccer player Mallory Swanson.

== Early life ==
Swanson was born on February 11, 1994, in Kennesaw, Georgia. Both of his parents were college athletes at Troy University: his mother, Nancy, played basketball and tennis, while his father, Cooter, played baseball and served as an assistant coach for the Trojans. Growing up within the Atlanta area, Swanson was a childhood fan of the Atlanta Braves of Major League Baseball (MLB) and often attended games at Turner Field. He was a two-sport varsity athlete at Marietta High School in Georgia, playing for both the school's baseball and basketball teams. During his senior season on the Marietta Blue Devils basketball team, Swanson had a 44 percent three-point field goal shooting rate and averaged 14 points per game. He finished his three-year varsity team basketball career with 165 three-pointers, earning the nickname "Three-point Swanson".

== College career ==
The Colorado Rockies of Major League Baseball (MLB) selected Swanson in the 38th round of the 2012 MLB draft, but he opted not to sign with them, instead honoring his commitment to play college baseball for the Vanderbilt Commodores. Swanson had received recruitment offers from a number of universities, including Troy, Clemson, and Georgia Tech, but he agreed to attend Vanderbilt after a conversation with coach Tim Corbin. A freshman for Vanderbilt's 2013 season, injuries and youth limited Swanson to only 11 games, four of which he started at shortstop. First, a broken bone in his foot kept him on the sidelines for six weeks. When he returned from that injury, he suffered a torn glenoid labrum. During the offseason, Swanson underwent shoulder surgery and exercised to prepare for his sophomore season in 2014.

When Tony Kemp left Vanderbilt after the 2014 season, Corbin asked Swanson to become the Commodores' starting second baseman as a sophomore in 2014. Swanson hit his first collegiate home run on February 28 in the fifth inning of Vanderbilt's 4–1 win over Stanford. By the end of March, Swanson's .430 on-base percentage (OBP) was second to shortstop Vince Conde on the Commodores. Swanson finished the regular Southeastern Conference (SEC) season with a team-leading .366 batting average, 47 runs scored, 21 doubles, and 17 stolen bases, and he was an All-SEC First Team selection. Although Vanderbilt was eliminated early in the 2014 SEC tournament by Ole Miss, Swanson and the rest of the team still clinched a berth in that year's NCAA tournament. Partway through the tournament, Swanson recorded his 27th double of the season during Vanderbilt's 6–4 win over UC Irvine, tying the school record set by Warner Jones 10 years prior. Vanderbilt's postseason run concluded with their first ever national championship when they defeated Virginia 3–2 in the College World Series (CWS) finals. Swanson was named the CWS Most Outstanding Player after batting .323 with five runs scored and two RBI in the tournament, as well as for his defense at second base. He was also named to the All-Tournament team at designated hitter, while Branden Cogswell of Virginia received the honor at second base.

Going into the 2015 college baseball season, Conde's departure and the season-long suspension of third baseman Xavier Turner forced Corbin to move several members of his infield: freshman Will Toffey started at third base, which pushed Tyler Campbell, who had played at third during the CWS, to second, and in turn moved Swanson to shortstop. By the end of March, the Commodores were second in the SEC with a .312 batting average, while Swanson led the conference with 30 runs scored. Between 2014 and 2015, he made 117 consecutive starts for Vanderbilt before missing the Commodores' April 28 game due to illness. After finishing the regular season with a .347 batting average, 50 RBI, 34 extra-base hits, and a conference-leading 60 runs scored, Swanson was both named to the All-SEC Second Team and was a semifinalist for the Dick Howser Trophy, given to the best college baseball player in the United States. He was also a finalist for the Golden Spikes Award, which ultimately went to Andrew Benintendi of Arkansas. Swanson rounded out the 2015 college baseball awards season with the Brooks Wallace Award, given to the best collegiate shortstop in the country.

While facing Missouri in the 2015 SEC tournament, both Swanson's two home runs and the Commodores' four as a team tied SEC Tournament single-game records. Vanderbilt finished second in the SEC Tournament after losing 7–3 to Florida in the conference finals. After hitting the game-winning home run against Indiana in the second game of the 2015 NCAA tournament, Swanson struggled in the tournament. Through the first eight games, he batted .242 with 11 strikeouts, and he was only 1-for-13 with five strikeouts and a defensive error in Vanderbilt's first three CWS games. In a rematch of the previous season's CWS, Virginia defeated Vanderbilt in the finals to win their first-ever national title.

== Professional career ==
=== Arizona Diamondbacks organization (2015) ===
The Arizona Diamondbacks selected Swanson first overall in the 2015 MLB draft. It was the first time a college shortstop had been drafted first overall since the San Diego Padres took Bill Almon in 1974. He signed with the team on July 17, 10 minutes before the 2 p.m. (PT) deadline for that year's draft picks, and accepted a $6.5 million signing bonus. His professional baseball debut was delayed when, during a simulated game before assignment to one of the Diamondbacks' minor league affiliates, Swanson was hit in the face by a fastball from pitching prospect Yoan López. He was diagnosed with a concussion and required 14 stitches on the side of his mouth. After recovering from the hit, Swanson was assigned to the Low–A Hillsboro Hops, making his professional debut on August 13, 2015. He went 0-for-2 at the plate, striking out twice, drawing a walk, and scoring a run. Having missed six weeks with the concussion, Swanson was told that he would finish the season with Hillsboro rather than receive a late-season promotion to push his development. He played in 22 games for the Hops, batting .289 with one home run and 11 RBI in 83 at bats while leading Hillsboro to a Northwest League championship.

=== Atlanta Braves (2016–2022) ===
On December 9, 2015, the Diamondbacks traded Swanson, Ender Inciarte, and Aaron Blair to the Atlanta Braves for Shelby Miller and Gabe Speier. The Braves were in the middle of a rebuild, and president of baseball operations John Hart said the team "wanted to make it painful for [Arizona] with players that we got back" by refusing a Miller trade until they received significant prospects like Swanson. After spending spring training with the Braves, Swanson was sent to the High–A Carolina Mudcats. He played 22 games there, batting .333 with a Carolina League-leading 12 doubles, before receiving a promotion to the Double-A Mississippi Braves at the end of April. Swanson spent the first part of the season in competition with Ozzie Albies for a future starting shortstop role in Atlanta, but in July, Albies, who had been playing in Triple-A, was sent down to Mississippi so that he and Swanson could practice as a second base-shortstop pair. That season, Swanson was selected to appear in both the Southern League All-Star Game and the All-Star Futures Game. He appeared in 84 games for Mississippi, batting .261 with eight home runs and 45 RBI. In 105 games between Carolina and Mississippi, he batted .275 for the minor league season, with nine home runs and 55 RBI in 411 at bats.

==== 2016–2018: Injuries and inconsistency ====
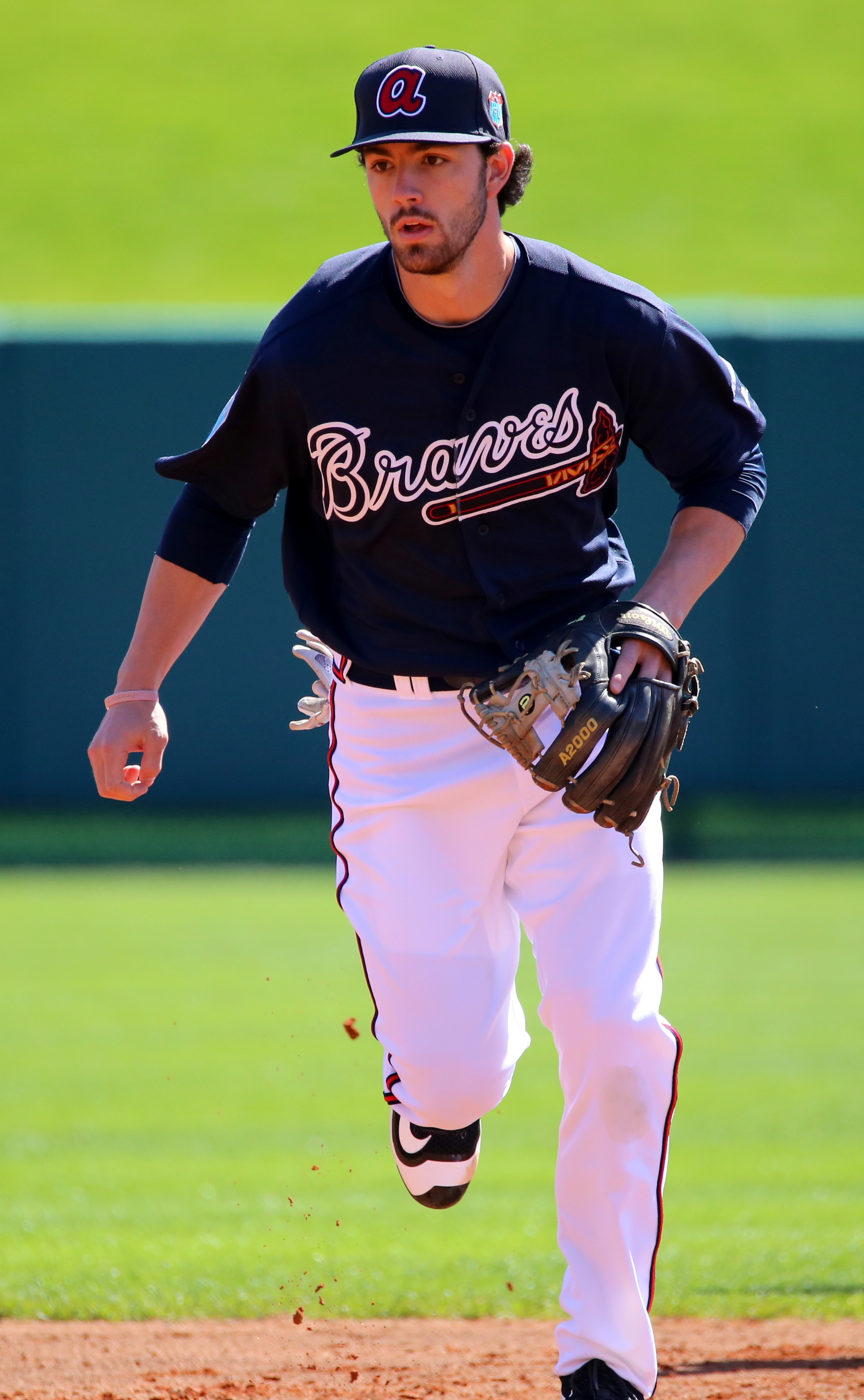
Swanson with the Braves during spring training in 2016

Swanson was called up to Atlanta on August 16, 2016, after the Braves traded shortstop Erick Aybar to the Detroit Tigers to clear the position for him. He made his MLB debut that day, recording his first two major league hits, both singles, in a 10–3 loss to the Minnesota Twins. His first major league home run, coming in the second inning of a 9–7 loss to the Washington Nationals on September 6, was inside-the-park: the hit off of Gio Gonzalez went over Trea Turner and ricocheted off the center field fence, and Swanson beat Bryce Harper's throw home to record the run. It was the first inside-the-park home run for the Braves since Wes Helms in 2001, and Swanson was the first Brave since Paul Runge in 1985 to have his first career home run fall inside the park. He remained with the Braves through the remainder of their 2016 season, finishing the year with a .302 batting average, three home runs, 17 RBI, and 11 extra-base hits. Swanson had at least one hit in 25 of the 38 games in which he played.

Swanson was the only rookie to make the Braves' 2017 Opening Day roster, joining Chase d'Arnaud, Freddie Freeman, Adonis Garcia, Jace Peterson, and Brandon Phillips in the infield. He began the season in a sophomore slump both offensively and defensively: by the end of May, Swanson was batting .185 with a .559 on-base plus slugging (OPS), while he had also committed 11 errors at shortstop. His struggles coincided with the arrival of Johan Camargo and Matt Adams, both of whom provided offensive power to the infield. Camargo, in particular, had taken over the majority of playing time at shortstop, while Ozzie Albies had just received a major league promotion. On July 27, Swanson was demoted to the Triple-A Gwinnett Stripers, where he could receive more regular playing time. At the time, he had been hitting .213 with six home runs and 35 RBI in 95 games. Additionally, he only had three hits in 25 at bats following the All-Star break. In 11 games for Gwinnett, Swanson hit .237 with one home run and five RBI. He was suddenly called back up to the Braves on August 9 after Camargo suffered a knee injury during his pre-game ritual. After returning to Atlanta, Swanson settled back into the shortstop position, batting .337 with a .434 OBP in the month after he replaced Camargo. Defensively, he and Albies, now playing second base, formed a strong middle-infield tandem. Swanson finished his first full season in Atlanta batting .232 with six home runs and 51 RBI in 144 games and 488 at bats.

Swanson began the 2018 season on a hot streak, recording multiple hits in four of the Braves' first six games. He began feeling discomfort in his left wrist at the end of April, and after aggravating the injury during a game against the New York Mets, he was placed on the 10-day disabled list on May 4. The injury seemed to coincide with a sudden drop in offensive power from Swanson: after batting .358 with a .976 OPS in his first 16 games, he dropped to batting .191 with a .468 OPS in the next 12. After a rehabilitation game in Double-A, Swanson returned to the Braves' lineup on May 19. He again struggled through most of the season, batting .234 with a .704 OPS between June 1 and August 21, a stretch that ended with Swanson's first career multi-home run game. After hitting off of Pittsburgh Pirates starting pitcher Ivan Nova in the fifth inning, he hit another home run in the seventh against reliever Michael Feliz, helping the Braves to a 6–1 win. He widened his batting stance in August and showed some improvement, batting .297 with six home runs between August 11 and September 2, but he hit only .161 in September.

On September 25, 2018, Swanson left a game against the New York Mets in the second inning with wrist pain, later revealed to be a partially torn ligament in his left hand that ruled him out for the remainder of the regular season. He continued to feel discomfort afterwards and was prevented from playing in the 2018 National League Division Series (NLDS). Instead, Charlie Culberson filled in at shortstop during the Braves' postseason run. The Braves lost to the Dodgers in the four game NLDS, while Swanson's hand and wrist continued to bother him until November 5, when he underwent surgery to remove a loose piece of cartilage. The cartilage had been moving around his wrist, and Swanson described the experience as "like if you would slam a wedge doorstop into a door". In 136 games, Swanson batted .238 with 14 home runs and 59 RBI, while defensively he improved from −7 Defensive Runs Saved in 2017 to 10 in 2018.

==== 2019–2020: Increasing offensive success ====
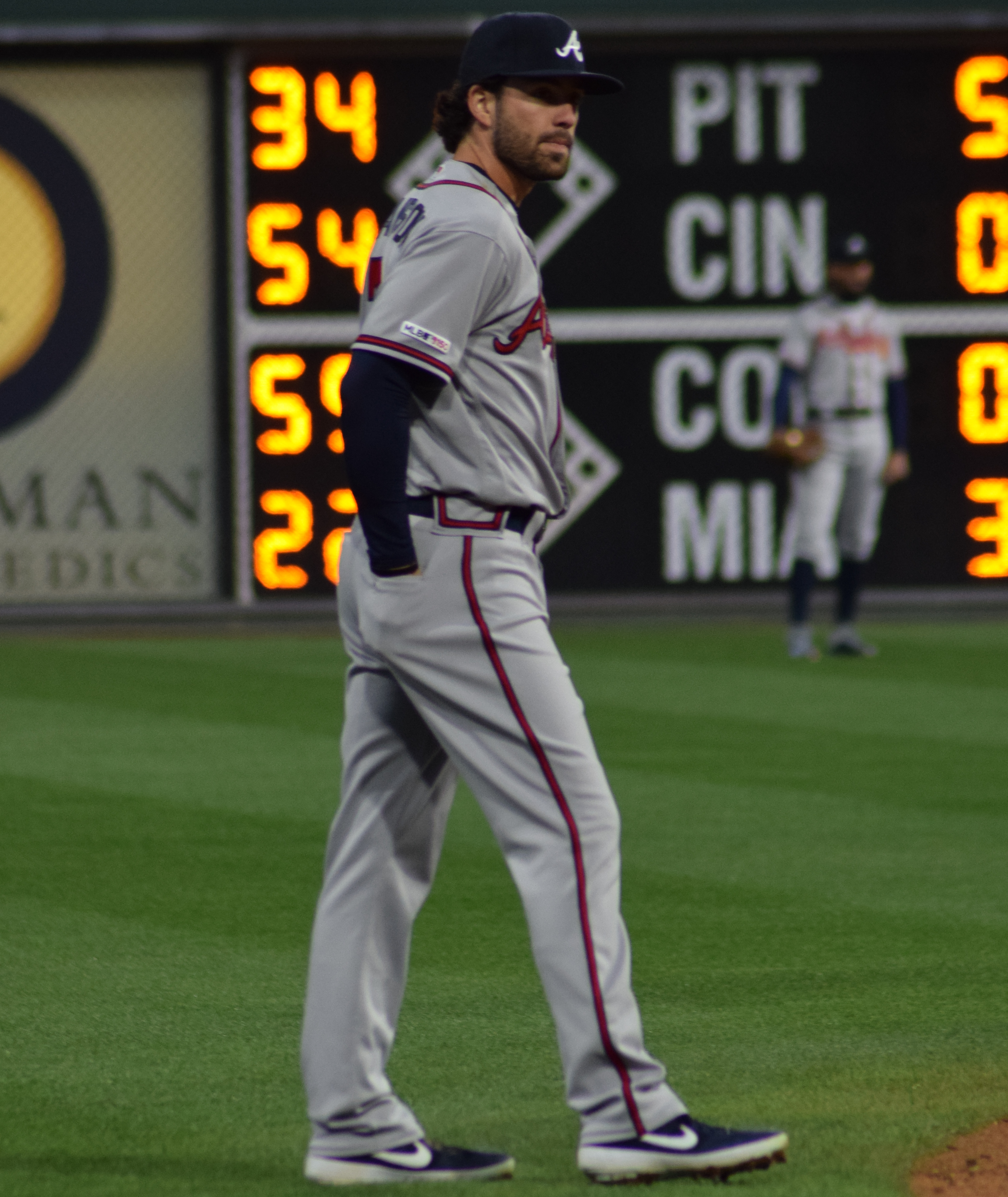
Swanson with the Braves in 2019

With his wrist no longer bothering him, Swanson showed a new offensive power during 2019 spring training, giving manager Brian Snitker hope that his production would increase. He seemed poised for a breakout through the first half of the season: by June 18, Swanson's 13 home runs were one shy of his previous career high, and his exit velocity, launch angle, and hard-hit rate at the plate all showed significant increases from the previous season. By the All-Star break, Swanson was batting .270 with 17 home runs and 57 RBI. On July 23, however, Swanson landed awkwardly on first base while attempting to run out a ground ball in a game against the Kansas City Royals, injuring his left heel in the process. The injury initially seemed minor, but he suffered a setback at the beginning of August, and after three weeks on the injured list, Swanson referred to the heel as "a frustrating injury". He was activated from the injured list on August 26, just over a month after suffering the injury. He struggled to hit after returning from the injury, batting only .141 in his first 23 games back from the injured list, but finished the season with eight hits in four games. In 545 plate appearances during the 2019 regular season, Swanson batted .251 with 17 home runs and 65 RBI.

After missing the previous year's postseason, Swanson was named to the Braves' roster as they faced the St. Louis Cardinals in the 2019 NLDS. In the ninth inning of Game 3, Swanson hit an RBI double off of Cardinals closer Carlos Martínez to tie the game 1–1. Adam Duvall followed this with a two-RBI single, and Mark Melancon held the Cardinals scoreless in the bottom of the ninth to win the game 3–1 for Atlanta. The Cardinals held on to win the series, however, with a 13–1 rout of the Braves in Game 5 to eliminate Atlanta from the playoffs. He went 5-for-18 at the plate during his first postseason run, with two RBI and three runs scored.

On January 10, 2020, Swanson agreed to a one-year, $3.15 million contract extension with the Braves. He had an immediately strong start to the 2020 season, which began in July and was shortened to only 60 games due to the COVID-19 pandemic. The Braves began their abbreviated season with a three-game series against the New York Mets, during which Swanson went 5-for-12 at the plate with a double, a home run, and six RBI. He hit his first walk-off home run on August 17, lifting the Braves to a 7–6 victory over the Washington Nationals. On September 9, Swanson was one of three Braves who scored five runs in the Braves' 29–9 rout of the Miami Marlins, a franchise record for the most runs in one game. Austin Riley and Adam Duvall also scored five runs apiece. Swanson played in all 60 games of the pandemic-shortened 2020 season, setting career highs with a .274 batting average, .345 on-base percentage, and .464 slugging percentage while recording 10 home runs and 35 RBI. His 49 runs scored were the third in MLB, behind teammate Freddie Freeman's 51 and Fernando Tatis Jr.'s 50. After the season, which was played without spectators in attendance due to COVID-19 safety protocols, Swanson said that playing in empty ballparks "felt like backyard baseball a little bit", and the lack of audience distractions led players "to feel comfortable in their own skin".

The Braves faced division rivals the Miami Marlins in the 2020 NLDS. Swanson's five RBI in the three-game series were the most of any Braves shortstop during a Division Series, while Atlanta advanced to the National League Championship Series (NLCS) for the first time since 2001. The Braves lost the 2020 NLCS to the Los Angeles Dodgers in seven games, and Swanson cost the team a potential scoring opportunity on a fourth-inning baserunning error. He broke for home plate on a ground ball from Nick Markakis and was caught in a rundown by third baseman Justin Turner and catcher Will Smith. Smith tagged Swanson out and then threw the ball back to third base, where Dodgers shortstop Corey Seager tagged out Austin Riley, who had tried to advance from second base during Swanson's rundown. The Braves had been leading 3–2 at the time of the double play, but ultimately lost the game 4–3.

==== 2021–2022: World Series championship, Gold Glove Award ====
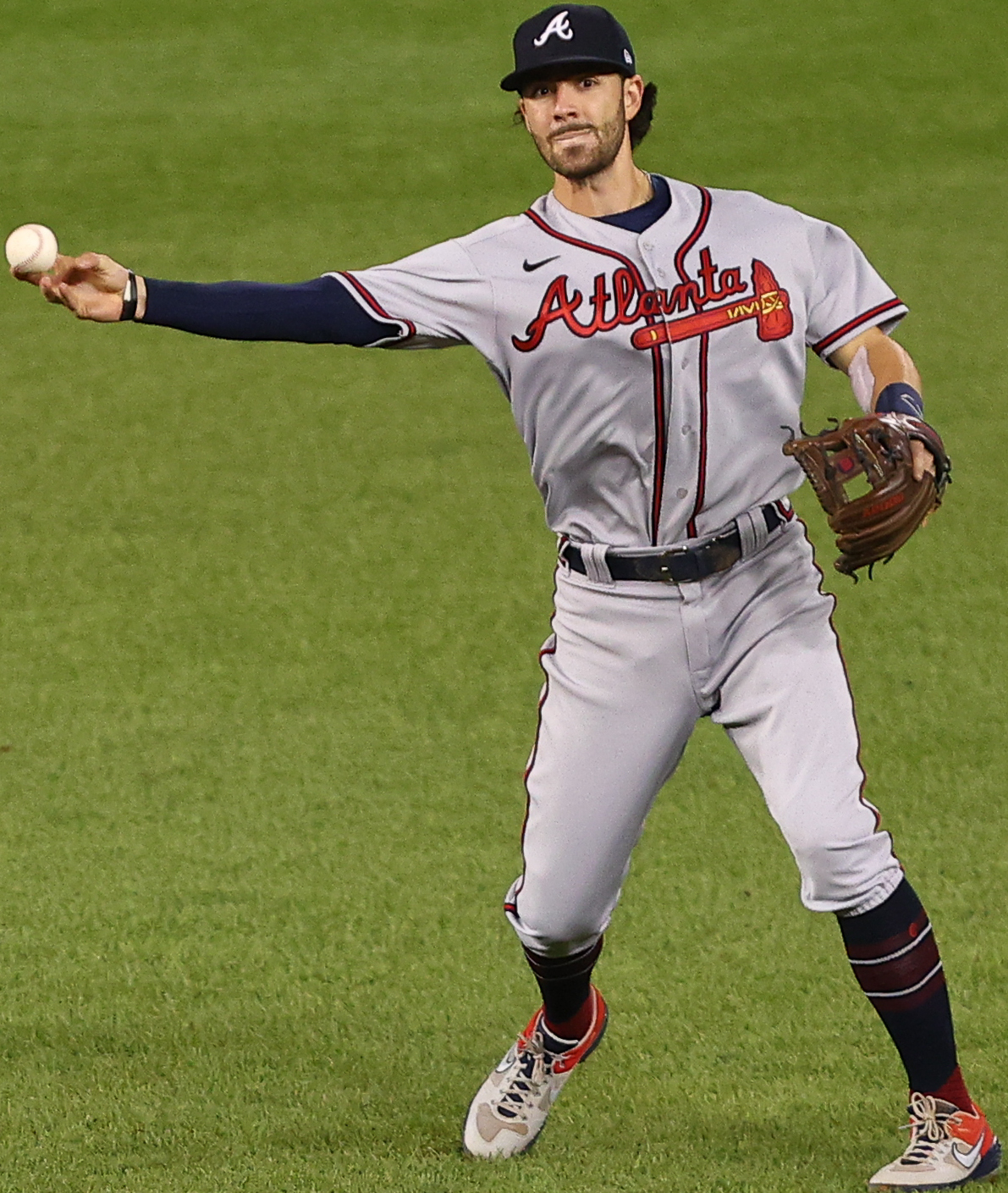
Swanson with the Braves in 2021

Swanson filed for salary arbitration during the 2020–21 offseason, but arbitrators denied his request to make $6.7 million the following year, instead ruling that his salary would be $6 million. He began the 2021 season in a slump, batting only .209 with a .631 OPS and 31.4 percent strikeout rate by May 20, but began to pick up in May, with four home runs in a 13-game stretch. On June 3, both Swanson and his middle infield partner Ozzie Albies recorded the 500th hits of their MLB career. Swanson's came on a home run that traveled 440 feet (130 m), the longest recorded during his time with the Braves. On July 22, Swanson hit his first major league grand slam, hitting against Matt Moore of the Philadelphia Phillies in a 7–2 Atlanta victory. It was his 17th home run of the season, tying Swanson's career high. He recorded another grand slam the following week, against John Curtiss of the Milwaukee Brewers. Swanson had hit a two-run home run earlier in the game, giving him 20 for the season, tying Denis Menke for the most of any Braves shortstop in one season. His next home run, which came against the Washington Nationals on August 13, gave Swanson the single-season home run record for any Braves shortstop. He played in 160 games during the 2021 regular season, the most of anyone in the National League, and batted .248 with 27 home runs and 88 RBI in 588 at bats.

The Braves clinched the NL East for the fourth consecutive season on September 30, 2021, with a 5–3 win over the Phillies. Swanson was instrumental in that process, with two doubles, a home run, and five RBI in the last six games before the Braves clinched the title. Swanson's defensive abilities were on display against the Brewers in the 2021 NLDS: in Game 3, he held Milwaukee scoreless on separate occasions, first by preventing runners from advancing on a groundout from Lorenzo Cain and then by turning an eighth-inning double play to retire Jace Peterson and Willy Adames. He was less adept at the plate, going only 3-for-15 in the four-game series. The Braves faced the Dodgers in the 2021 NLCS, where in Game 1 Swanson tagged out Chris Taylor to prevent Los Angeles from breaking a 2–2 tie in the top of the ninth inning. The Braves won the game 3–2 on a walk-off RBI single from Austin Riley. His offensive troubles continued, however, with only two hits in 23 at bats during the six-game series. By Game 4 of the 2021 World Series, Swanson was only batting .225 in the postseason, and he had mostly gone hitless. In the seventh inning, however, he hit a 95 mph (153 km/h) fastball from Houston Astros reliever Cristian Javier for a game-tying home run. Jorge Soler's home run secured a 3–2 victory for Atlanta, putting them one game within reach of their first championship since 1995. With the Astros down 7–0 in Game 6, Swanson secured the final out of the game to give the Braves the World Series championship title.

Swanson's salary for the 2022 season was decided via the arbitration process. He asked for and received $10 million. Swanson was named to the 2022 Major League Baseball All-Star Game roster. On September 30, 2022, Swanson hit his 100th career home run, off New York Mets pitcher Jacob deGrom. Swanson was the only player in Major League Baseball to start all 162 games of the season. He struggled in the playoffs, batting .176 in the four-game loss to the Phillies in the NLDS. Swanson won his first Gold Glove Award at the end of the season. He became a free agent at the conclusion of the season.

=== Chicago Cubs (2023–present) ===
On December 21, 2022, Swanson signed a seven-year, $177 million contract with the Chicago Cubs. On July 2, 2023, Swanson was named to his second All-Star team. On July 7, he was placed on the 10-day injured list with a heel contusion, and he was replaced by Geraldo Perdomo on the All-Star team. In his first season with the Cubs, Swanson batted .244 with 22 home runs. He won his second consecutive Gold Glove.

In the 2024 season, Swanson hit .242 with 16 home runs. He was a finalist for the Gold Glove award, losing out to Ezequiel Tovar.

In the 2025 season, Swanson hit .244 with 24 home runs and 77 RBI.

On July 1, 2026, Swanson set career–highs with three home runs and eight RBI in a 23–3 win over the San Diego Padres. In a 10-day stretch, Swanson tallied 26 RBI, becoming the first player since 1939 to do so, and joining Mel Ott, Lou Gehrig, Jimmie Foxx, and Joe DiMaggio as the only other players to accomplish this feat. Swanson also surpassed Sammy Sosa's franchise record of 25 RBI in a 10-game span (twice), more recently attained from August 8 to 17, 2002.

== International career ==
In 2014, Swanson represented USA Baseball at Haarlem Baseball Week in the Netherlands. In his first six starts, Swanson led the team with a .458 batting average in 24 at bats. The US team won the gold medal with their 6–3 victory over Japan, and Swanson went on to participate in the team's Cuban tour, in which they were swept by the host team. He had 66 at bats for Team USA, finishing second on the team with a .288 batting average.

== Personal life ==
Swanson married Mallory Pugh of the Chicago Red Stars and the United States women's national soccer team on December 10, 2022. They met through her brother-in-law, Jace Peterson, Swanson's former teammate, and began dating in 2017. In May 2025, the couple announced on social media they were expecting their first child. Their daughter, Josie James Swanson, was born on November 14, 2025.

Swanson is the first MLB player to have "Dansby" in any part of his name. Justin and Leonidas Dansby appeared in Minor League Baseball but did not reach the majors. Swanson's first name is James; Dansby is his mother's maiden name. He is the youngest of three children. Both of his older siblings played college sports: Chase played baseball for the Mercer Bears, while his sister Lindsey played softball at Georgia College.

Swanson has anxiety, which negatively impacted his performance during his first few seasons of professional baseball. A devout Christian, he credits his faith with helping him through his panic attacks.
