= 2018 Haarlem Baseball Week =

Tournament details
- Country: Netherlands
- City: Haarlem
- Dates: 13–22 July
- Teams: 6

Final positions
- Champions: Japan (4th title)
- Runners-up: Chinese Taipei
- Third place: Netherlands
- Fourth place: Cuba

Tournament statistics
- Games played: 21

The 2018 Haarlem Baseball Week was an international baseball competition held at Pim Mulier Stadium in Haarlem, the Netherlands from 13–22 July 2018. It was the 29th edition of the tournament.

Japan became champions for the fourth time, beating Chinese Taipei in the final, which was Chinese Taipei's first finals appeance in the tournament.

== Teams ==
A usual number of six teams were invited to the tournament.

Chinese Taipei^{1}	10th appearance
Cuba	14th appearance
Germany	1st appearance^{2}
Italy	5th appearance
Japan	15th appearance
Netherlands	Host nation

^1 Chinese Taipei is the official IBAF designation for the team representing Taiwan
^2 As national team. 6 non-national teams from West Germany have appeared before.

== Group stage ==
=== Standings ===
Teams	W	L	Pct.	GB	R	RA
Japan	5	0	1.000	—	20	5
Chinese Taipei	4	1	.800	1	30	11
Netherlands	3	2	.600	2	24	12
Italy	2	3	.400	3	13	16
Germany	1	4	.200	4	10	30
Cuba	0	5	.000	5	14	37
Source: "Programma en uitslagen". Honkbalweek Haarlem.

=== Game results ===
13 July 2018	Japan	1 – 0	Italy	Pim Mulier Stadium, Haarlem
13 July 2018		Boxscore		Pim Mulier Stadium, Haarlem

13 July 2018	Germany	0 – 6	Netherlands	Pim Mulier Stadium, Haarlem
13 July 2018		Boxscore		Pim Mulier Stadium, Haarlem

14 July 2018	Chinese Taipei	0 – 1	Japan	Pim Mulier Stadium, Haarlem
14 July 2018		Boxscore		Pim Mulier Stadium, Haarlem

14 July 2018	Italy	0 – 7	Netherlands	Pim Mulier Stadium, Haarlem
14 July 2018		Boxscore		Pim Mulier Stadium, Haarlem

14 July 2018	Germany	5 – 4	Cuba	Pim Mulier Stadium, Haarlem
14 July 2018		Boxscore		Pim Mulier Stadium, Haarlem

15 July 2018	Netherlands	2 – 3	Chinese Taipei	Pim Mulier Stadium, Haarlem
15 July 2018		Boxscore		Pim Mulier Stadium, Haarlem

15 July 2018	Cuba	1 – 7	Japan	Pim Mulier Stadium, Haarlem
15 July 2018		Boxscore		Pim Mulier Stadium, Haarlem

16 July 2018	Italy	7 – 3	Cuba	Pim Mulier Stadium, Haarlem
16 July 2018		Boxscore		Pim Mulier Stadium, Haarlem

16 July 2018	Japan	6 – 1	Germany	Pim Mulier Stadium, Haarlem
16 July 2018		Boxscore		Pim Mulier Stadium, Haarlem

17 July 2018	Chinese Taipei	4 – 3	Italy	Pim Mulier Stadium, Haarlem
17 July 2018		Boxscore		Pim Mulier Stadium, Haarlem

17 July 2018	Netherlands	6 – 4	Cuba	Pim Mulier Stadium, Haarlem
17 July 2018		Boxscore		Pim Mulier Stadium, Haarlem

18 July 2018	Germany	3 – 11	Chinese Taipei	Pim Mulier Stadium, Haarlem
18 July 2018		Boxscore		Pim Mulier Stadium, Haarlem

18 July 2018	Netherlands	3 – 5	Japan	Pim Mulier Stadium, Haarlem
18 July 2018		Boxscore		Pim Mulier Stadium, Haarlem

19 July 2018	Cuba	2 – 12	Chinese Taipei	Pim Mulier Stadium, Haarlem
19 July 2018		Boxscore		Pim Mulier Stadium, Haarlem

19 July 2018	Italy	3 – 1	Germany	Pim Mulier Stadium, Haarlem
19 July 2018		Boxscore		Pim Mulier Stadium, Haarlem

== Play-offs ==
20 July 2018 - Game 16	(5) Germany	1 – 7	Cuba (6)	Pim Mulier Stadium, Haarlem
20 July 2018 - Game 16		Boxscore		Pim Mulier Stadium, Haarlem

20 July 2018 - Game 17	(3) Netherlands	2 – 1	Italy (4)	Pim Mulier Stadium, Haarlem
20 July 2018 - Game 17		Boxscore		Pim Mulier Stadium, Haarlem

20 July 2018 - Game 18	(1) Japan	8 – 1	Chinese Taipei (2)	Pim Mulier Stadium, Haarlem
20 July 2018 - Game 18		Boxscore		Pim Mulier Stadium, Haarlem

21 July 2018 - Game 19	(L17) Italy	5 – 9	Cuba (W16)	Pim Mulier Stadium, Haarlem
21 July 2018 - Game 19		Boxscore		Pim Mulier Stadium, Haarlem

21 July 2018 - Game 20	(L18) Chinese Taipei	7 – 5	Netherlands (W17)	Pim Mulier Stadium, Haarlem
21 July 2018 - Game 20		Boxscore		Pim Mulier Stadium, Haarlem

== Final ==
22 July 2018 - Final	(W18) Japan	5 – 0	Chinese Taipei (W20)	Pim Mulier Stadium, Haarlem
22 July 2018 - Final		Boxscore		Pim Mulier Stadium, Haarlem

== Final standings ==
Rk	Team
1	Japan
2	Chinese Taipei
3	Netherlands
4	Cuba
5	Italy
6	Germany

2018 Haarlem Baseball Week champions

Japan
4th title
