= Vince Conde =

American baseball player (born 1993)

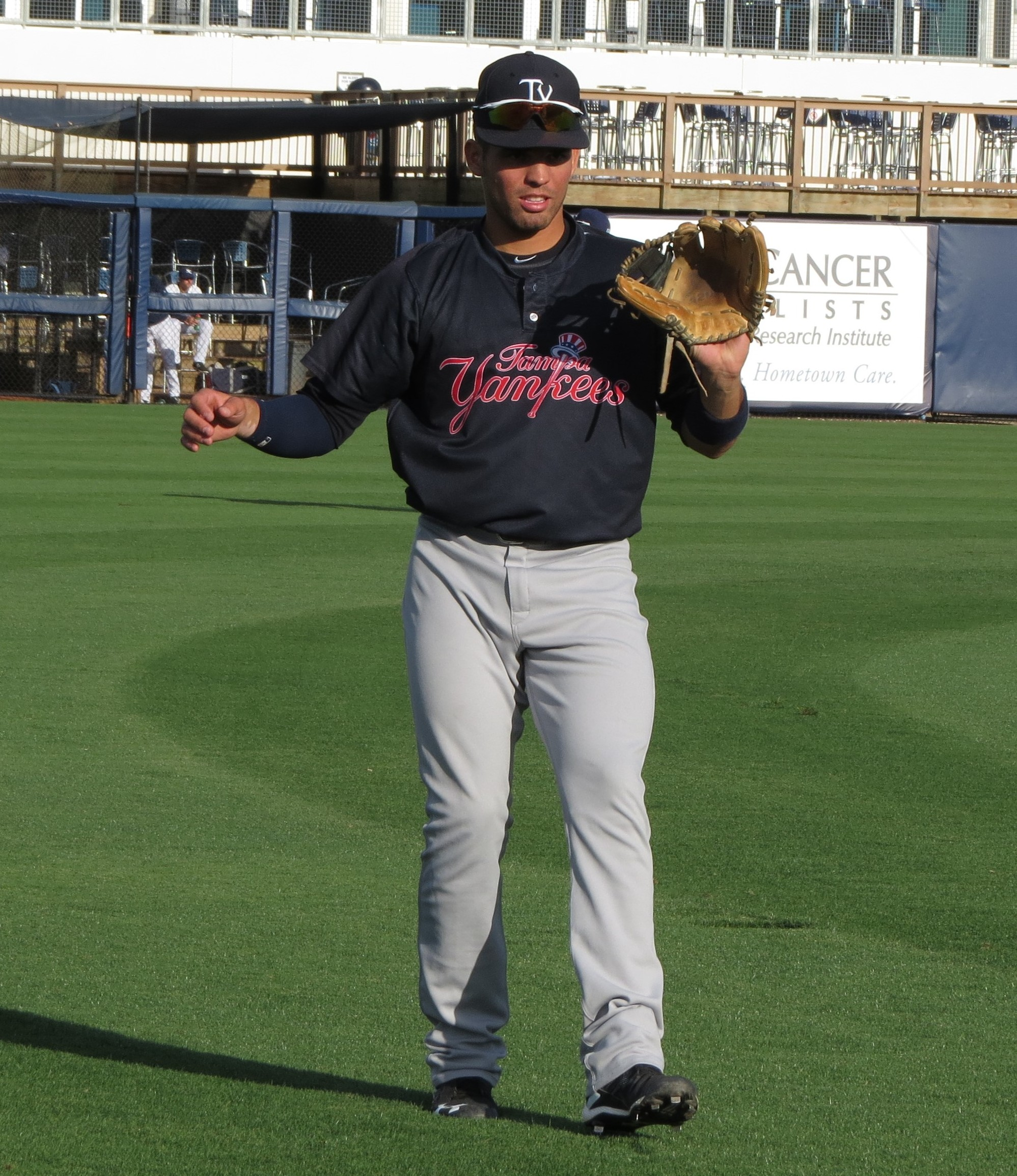
- Infielder
- Born: October 13, 1993 (age 33); San Juan, Puerto Rico
- Bats: Right Throws: Right
- Stats at Baseball Reference

Vicente David Conde (born October 13, 1993) is an American former professional baseball shortstop. He played college baseball for the Vanderbilt Commodores, who won the 2014 College World Series.

== Amateur career ==
=== High school ===
Conde attended Orangewood Christian High School in Maitland, Florida, and played for the school's baseball team. In 2011, his senior year, Orangewood Christian set a Florida state record for home runs.

=== College ===
Conde enrolled at Vanderbilt University, and played college baseball for the Vanderbilt Commodores baseball team. He played as a third baseman as a freshman, but moved to shortstop as a sophomore due to an injury to Dansby Swanson. When Swanson returned from injury, he shifted to second base due to Conde's strong defense at shortstop. In 2013, he played collegiate summer baseball with the Orleans Firebirds of the Cape Cod Baseball League. As a junior in 2014, Conde had a .284 batting average, 50 runs batted in (RBI). He won the Gold Glove award as the nation's best defensive shortstop, as he committed four errors in 223 total chances, good for a .984 fielding percentage. Conde had a RBI during the deciding game of the 2014 College World Series, as Vanderbilt defeated the Virginia Cavaliers.

== Professional career ==
=== New York Yankees ===
The New York Yankees selected Conde in the ninth round, with the 272nd overall selection, of the 2014 Major League Baseball draft. Conde signed with the Yankees, receiving a $155,000 signing bonus. The Yankees assigned him to play for the Staten Island Yankees of the Low-A New York–Penn League, where he batted .224 with 16 RBI in 38 games. In 2015, Conde played for the Single-A Charleston RiverDogs, High-A Trenton Thunder, Double-A Tampa Yankees, and Triple-A Scranton/Wilkes-Barre RailRiders, posting a combined .233 batting average with seven home runs, 35 RBI, and a .683 OPS in 114 combined appearances between the four affiliates.

Conde split the 2016 season between Tampa, Trenton, and Charleston, batting .231 with one home run, 32 RBI, and a .331 OBP in 84 games between the three affiliates. Conde returned to those three affiliates for the 2017 campaign, batting .141 with three home runs and 16 RBI in 56 combined appearances.

Conde was released by the Yankees organization on May 28, 2018.

=== New Britain Bees ===
On June 26, 2018, Conde signed with the New Britain Bees of the Atlantic League of Professional Baseball. In 55 appearances for the Bees, he slashed .165/.281/.229 with two home runs, 20 RBI, and six stolen bases. Conde became a free agent following the season.

=== Sussex County Miners ===
In 2020, after a year of inactivity, Conde signed with the Sussex County Miners of the American Association of Professional Baseball. In 22 appearances for the team, Conde batted .150/.292/.338 with four home runs, nine RBI, and six stolen bases.

== Personal life ==
Conde was born in San Juan, Puerto Rico. He grew up rooting for the Yankees and the Miami Marlins, following Derek Jeter's career closely.
