= 2014 Haarlem Baseball Week =

Tournament details
- Country: Netherlands
- City: Haarlem
- Dates: 11–20 July
- Teams: 4

Final positions
- Champions: United States (5th title)
- Runners-up: Japan
- Third place: Netherlands
- Fourth place: Chinese Taipei

Tournament statistics
- Games played: 15

Awards
- MVP: (United States) Alex Bregman

The 2014 Haarlem Baseball Week was an international baseball competition held at the Pim Mulier Stadium in Haarlem, the Netherlands from July 11–20, 2014. It was the 27th edition of the tournament.

In the final the United States won over Japan, becoming champions for the fifth time as the national team.

== Teams ==
Due to difficult economic times, the organisation had to decide not to invite reigning champions Cuba. This was announced after the first four teams (Chinese Taipei, Japan, Netherlands, United States) had already signed their contracts. Other teams had also canceled their participation for various reasons, including the inability to send an up-to-par team. As a result, only four teams competed in this tournament instead of the usual six.

Chinese Taipei^{1}	8th appearance
Japan	13th appearance
Netherlands	Host nation
United States	8th appearance

^1 Chinese Taipei is the official IBAF designation for the team representing Taiwan.

== Group stage ==
=== Standings ===
Teams	W	L	Pct.	GB	R	RA
United States	5	1	.833	—	24	2
Japan	4	2	.667	1	9	10
Netherlands	3	3	.500	2	15	19
Chinese Taipei	0	6	.000	5	3	20

=== Game results ===
July 11, 2014	United States	0 – 1	Japan	Pim Mulier Stadium, Haarlem
July 11, 2014		Boxscore		Pim Mulier Stadium, Haarlem

July 12, 2014	Japan	2 – 0	Chinese Taipei	Pim Mulier Stadium, Haarlem
July 12, 2014		Boxscore		Pim Mulier Stadium, Haarlem

July 12, 2014	Netherlands	0 – 3	United States	Pim Mulier Stadium, Haarlem; Attendance: 3,000
July 12, 2014		Boxscore		Pim Mulier Stadium, Haarlem; Attendance: 3,000

July 13, 2014	Chinese Taipei	3 – 6	Netherlands	Pim Mulier Stadium, Haarlem
July 13, 2014		Boxscore		Pim Mulier Stadium, Haarlem

July 14, 2014	United States	4 – 0	Chinese Taipei	Pim Mulier Stadium, Haarlem; Attendance: 600
July 14, 2014		Boxscore		Pim Mulier Stadium, Haarlem; Attendance: 600

July 14, 2014	Netherlands	1 – 3	Japan	Pim Mulier Stadium, Haarlem
July 14, 2014		Boxscore		Pim Mulier Stadium, Haarlem

July 15, 2014	Japan	0 – 6	United States	Pim Mulier Stadium, Haarlem
July 15, 2014		Boxscore		Pim Mulier Stadium, Haarlem

July 16, 2014	Chinese Taipei	0 – 1	Japan	Pim Mulier Stadium, Haarlem; Attendance: 1,935
July 16, 2014		Boxscore		Pim Mulier Stadium, Haarlem; Attendance: 1,935

July 16, 2014	United States	8 – 1	Netherlands	Pim Mulier Stadium, Haarlem; Attendance: 3,000
July 16, 2014		Boxscore		Pim Mulier Stadium, Haarlem; Attendance: 3,000

July 17, 2014	Netherlands	4 – 0	Chinese Taipei	Pim Mulier Stadium, Haarlem
July 17, 2014		Boxscore		Pim Mulier Stadium, Haarlem

July 18, 2014	Chinese Taipei	0 – 3	United States	Pim Mulier Stadium, Haarlem; Attendance: 1,024
July 18, 2014		Boxscore		Pim Mulier Stadium, Haarlem; Attendance: 1,024

July 18, 2014	Japan	2 – 3	Netherlands	Pim Mulier Stadium, Haarlem; Attendance: 2,061
July 18, 2014		Boxscore		Pim Mulier Stadium, Haarlem; Attendance: 2,061

== Final round ==
=== Semi finals ===
July 19, 2014	United States	4 – 1	Chinese Taipei	Pim Mulier Stadium, Haarlem
July 19, 2014		Boxscore		Pim Mulier Stadium, Haarlem

July 19, 2014	Japan	2 – 1	Netherlands	Pim Mulier Stadium, Haarlem; Attendance: 1,961
July 19, 2014		Boxscore		Pim Mulier Stadium, Haarlem; Attendance: 1,961

=== Final ===
July 20, 2014	United States	6 – 3	Japan	Pim Mulier Stadium, Haarlem; Attendance: 2,014
July 20, 2014		Boxscore		Pim Mulier Stadium, Haarlem; Attendance: 2,014

== Final standings ==
Rk	Team
1	United States
2	Japan
3	Netherlands
4	Chinese Taipei

2014 Haarlem Baseball Week champions

United States
5th title
