= Marco Gonzales =

American baseball player (born 1992)

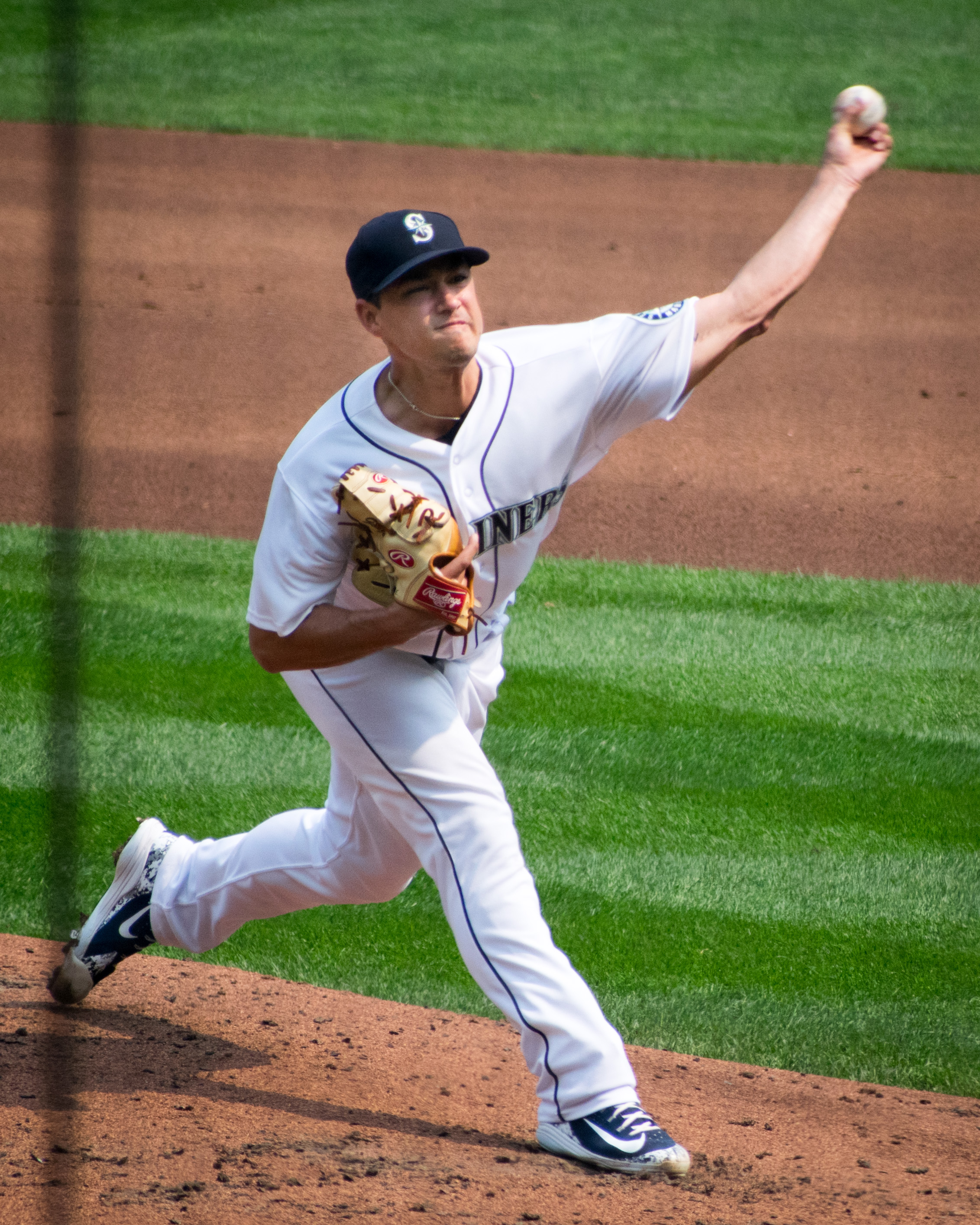
- Gonzales with the Seattle Mariners in 2018

Free agent
- Pitcher
- Born: February 16, 1992 (age 34); Fort Collins, Colorado, U.S.
- Bats: Left Throws: Left

MLB debut
- June 25, 2014, for the St. Louis Cardinals

MLB statistics (through July 30, 2026)
- Win–loss record: 66–50
- Earned run average: 4.14
- Strikeouts: 691
- Stats at Baseball Reference

Teams
- St. Louis Cardinals (2014–2015, 2017); Seattle Mariners (2017–2023); Pittsburgh Pirates (2024); Texas Rangers (2026)
Medals
Men's baseball
Representing the United States
Haarlem Baseball Week
Bronze medal – third place	2012	Team

Marco Elias Gonzales (born February 16, 1992) is an American professional baseball pitcher who is a free agent. He has previously played in Major League Baseball (MLB) for the St. Louis Cardinals, Seattle Mariners, Pittsburgh Pirates, and Texas Rangers.

Gonzales played college baseball for the Gonzaga Bulldogs as a pitcher and first baseman. He won the West Coast Conference Player of the Year, Pitcher of the Year, and Freshman of the Year awards. He was chosen twice as a third-team All-American and won the John Olerud Award in 2013.

The Cardinals selected Gonzales with the 19th overall pick in the first round of the 2013 MLB draft. In the minors in 2014, he was a Texas League midseason All-Star and Pitcher of the Week selection and the Cardinals' Minor League Pitcher of the Year. He made his MLB debut that year, then underwent Tommy John surgery in 2016. The Cardinals traded him to the Mariners in 2017. He started three consecutive Opening Days for the Mariners. He was traded twice after the 2023 season, ending up with Pittsburgh.

== Amateur career ==
Gonzales attended Rocky Mountain High School in Fort Collins, Colorado. He lettered in baseball in all four years. In his sophomore, junior, and senior seasons, he was named All-Colorado and All-Front Range. As a senior, he was named the Colorado High School Baseball Player of the Year after compiling an 11–0 win–loss record with a 2.20 earned run average (ERA) and 87 strikeouts in 54 innings pitched (IP). He also batted .486 with seven home runs and 36 runs batted in (RBI). He started the Class 5A state championship game for Rocky Mountain in all four years of his high school career, winning all four.

The Colorado Rockies selected Gonzales in the 29th round of the 2010 Major League Baseball (MLB) draft. However, the Rockies did not make a "stunning" offer and understood he planned to attend college. Gonzales enrolled at Gonzaga University to play college baseball for the Bulldogs. That summer, he played collegiate summer baseball for the Saskatoon Yellow Jackets of the Western Canadian Baseball League, and the Wenatchee AppleSox of the West Coast League after the WMBL season was over.

As a freshman at Gonzaga, Gonzales finished with an 11–2 record and 2.57 ERA, and shared West Coast Conference (WCC) co-Player of the Year and co-Freshman of the Year honors with Kris Bryant. As a sophomore, Gonzales was 8–2 with a 1.55 ERA and was named WCC Pitcher of the Year and a third-team All-American. That summer, he briefly played collegiate summer baseball with the Falmouth Commodores of the Cape Cod Baseball League, and played for the United States national collegiate baseball team in tournaments in Cuba and the Netherlands, being named the best pitcher of the Dutch Haarlem Baseball Week tournament.

In 2013, his junior year, he had a 7–3 record with a 2.80 ERA and led the team in hitting with a .311 batting average, two home runs, and 26 RBI, earning him co-WCC Player of the Year honors. Gonzales was named a semifinalist for the Golden Spikes Award. He won the John Olerud Award, awarded annually by the College Baseball Foundation to the best two-way player of the season.

== Professional career ==
=== St. Louis Cardinals ===
==== Draft and minor leagues ====
Gonzales was widely considered to be a first-round pick before the 2013 MLB draft. The St. Louis Cardinals selected him 19th overall. He signed on June 19 for $1.85 million.

The Cardinals assigned him to the Gulf Coast League Cardinals in the rookie-level Gulf Coast League, then promoted him to the Palm Beach Cardinals of the High-A Florida State League. He pitched 23 1/3 innings with a 2.70 ERA between the two teams. He allowed 18 hits and eight walks while striking out 23.

==== 2014: MLB debut ====
Gonzales began the 2014 season with Palm Beach and received a promotion to the Springfield Cardinals of the Double-A Texas League in May. After seven starts at Springfield, he had a 3–2 and 2.33 ERA in 38 2/3 innings pitched. He allowed 33 hits, two home runs, and 10 walks while striking out 46. He was rated the #4 prospect in the Cardinals' organization. The Cardinals called him up to the major leagues, and, the day before he made his MLB debut, he was named to the 2014 All-Star Futures Game at Target Field in Minneapolis, Minnesota.

Filling in for the injured Jaime García, Gonzales made his major league debut as the starter against the Colorado Rockies on June 25. Due to his promotion to the major leagues, he was removed from the Futures Game roster. He doubled in his first major league at-bat. Left fielder and former Rockie Matt Holliday singled him home to score his first run. On the mound, he gave up five earned runs and seven hits, with one home run in five innings, walking two, striking out three, facing 24 batters, and received a no-decision. Gonzales began with three scoreless innings, but got into trouble in the fourth by giving up a lead-off home run to Drew Stubbs, two doubles and two singles. The Cardinals eventually won, 9–6. Gonzales became the first Cardinals' starter to make his debut without playing at the Triple A level since Cliff Politte in April 1998.

Gonzales' second MLB start came against the San Francisco Giants at AT&T Park. The outing went similar to his first MLB appearance, he started with three scoreless innings but yielded multiple runs in the fourth. In 4 1/3 innings, he allowed five earned runs, seven hits, four walks and two strikeouts. The Giants won 5–0, giving him his first MLB loss. After posting a 7.07 ERA in first three MLB starts, the Cardinals optioned him to the Triple-A Memphis Redbirds on July 7, where he appeared for the first time.

On August 30, the Cardinals recalled Gonzales, and he gained his first MLB win in a 13–2 romp over the Chicago Cubs. He completed six innings, allowed one run on three hits, two walks, and struck out five. Gonzales' third win of the season came against the Rockies by a score of 4–1 on September 14 as he struck out nine in 5 2/3 innings pitched. The nine strikeouts were the most by a Cardinals left-handed rookie since Rick Ankiel on September 13, 2000. He made 10 total MLB appearances, five as a starter, completing 34 2/3 innings pitched, allowing 32 H, 21 BB, 16 ER and a 4.15 ERA with a 4–2 record. In 31 total games – including 26 starts – between three minor league levels and the major leagues, Gonzales allowed a 2.81 ERA with a 13–7 record and 148 strikeouts in 156 2/3 innings.

Gonzales made his MLB postseason debut, pitching in relief. He recorded three total scoreless innings in the National League Division Series (NLDS) against the Los Angeles Dodgers. He picked up two of the club's three wins, including the series clincher. He pitched another three innings against the Giants in the National League Championship Series (NLCS), giving up three earned runs as the Cardinals were eliminated from the postseason. In December, the Cardinals named him their Minor League Pitcher of the Year.

==== 2015 ====
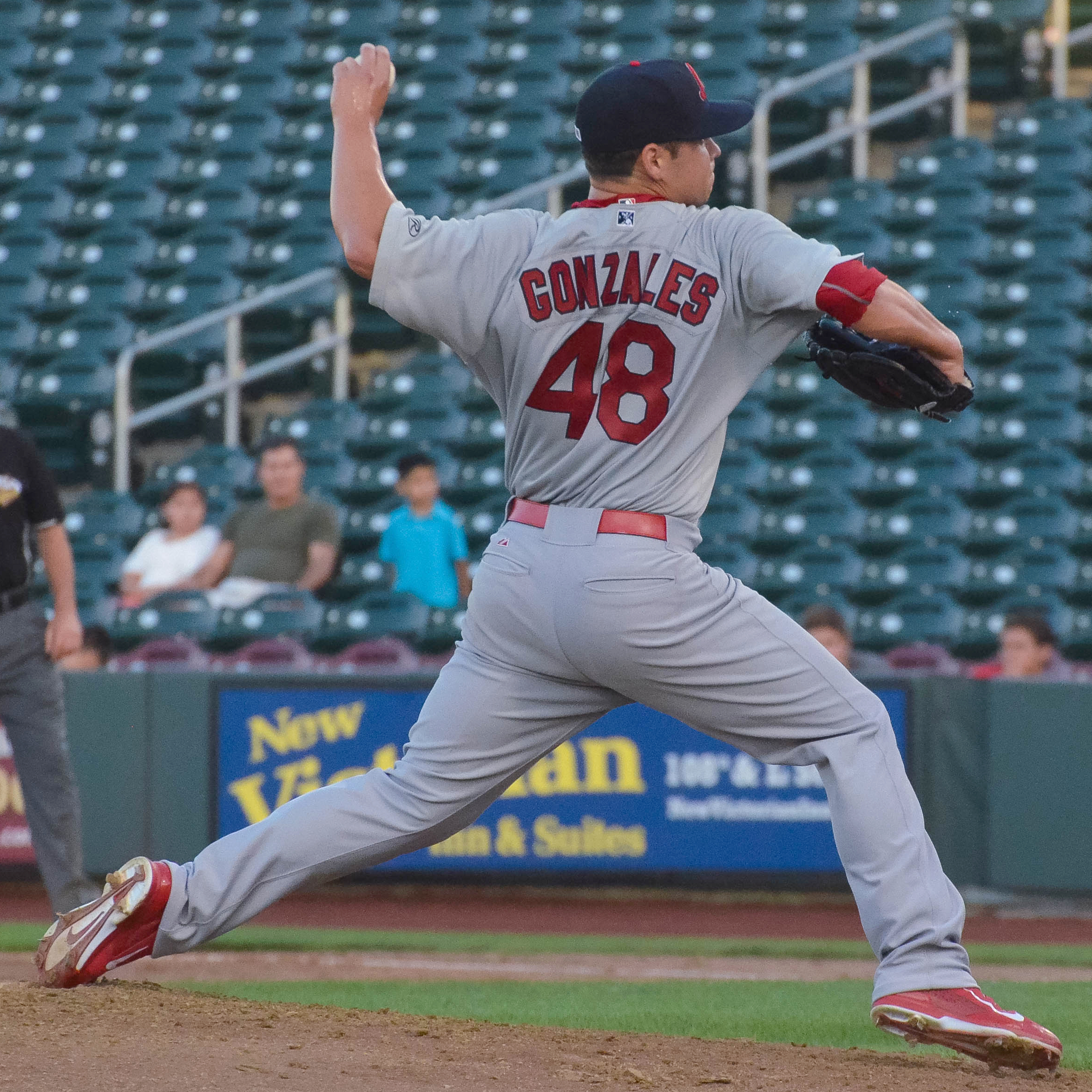
Gonzales in 2015

Having struggled with a shoulder injury for much of the 2015 season, Gonzales totaled 13 starts and 64 innings with Memphis, allowing a 5.20 ERA with 81 hits and a .315 batting average against. His record was 1–4. The Cardinals activated him with the roster expansion on September 1. He made his first major league appearance and start of the season against the Washington Nationals that day, allowing four runs in less than three innings. Prior to the 2016 season, Baseball America ranked him as the fifth-best prospect in the Cardinals' system.

==== 2016–2017 ====
Gonzales was sidelined on April 13, 2016, after a diagnosis on a torn ulnar collateral ligament in his left elbow. The injury required Tommy John surgery later that month, putting Gonzales out for the entire season. He was ranked the seventh-best prospect in the Cardinals' organization.

Gonzales was recalled on June 13, 2017, to start Game 2 of a doubleheader against the Milwaukee Brewers. It was his first start in the majors since September 1, 2015.

=== Seattle Mariners ===
==== 2017–2018 ====
On July 21, 2017, the Cardinals traded Gonzales to the Seattle Mariners for outfielder Tyler O'Neill. Gonzales made his Mariners debut on August 6, 2017 against the Kansas City Royals, pitching 4 innings and allowing 5 earned runs on 7 hits, a walk, and 5 strikeouts. With the Mariners, he made 7 starts (10 appearances total), going 1–1 with a 5.40 ERA (22 earned runs) and 4.28 FIP with 30 strikeouts and 11 walks.

After pitching to a 1–1 record and 2.08 ERA in seven spring training starts, Gonzales was rewarded a spot on the Mariners' 2018 Opening Day roster and was slotted 4th in their starting rotation. On June 29, he threw his first career complete game against Kansas City, limiting them to just 1 run on 6 hits, 7 strikeouts, and no walks. Gonzales finished the first half of the season with a 10–5 record and 3.41 ERA in 19 starts (113 1/3 innings). However, he faltered down the stretch, posting a 3–4 record with 5.23 ERA in 10 starts (53 1/3 innings). Nonetheless, Gonzales managed to stay healthy in his first full season in Seattle, starting a career-high 29 games, leading the team in wins with 13 while striking out 145 batters and compiling a 4.00 ERA and 3.43 FIP over 166 2/3 innings pitched.

==== 2019–2021: Opening Day starter ====
On March 9, 2019, Gonzales was named the Mariners' Opening Day starter for their opening series in Japan. It also marked the first year that Félix Hernández would not be the Mariners' Opening Day starter in 10 years. In his first Opening Day start against the Oakland Athletics on March 20 in Tokyo, Japan, Gonzales earned his first win of the season by throwing 6 innings and allowing 4 runs (3 of which were earned) on 7 hits, 1 walk, and 4 strikeouts. Gonzales was the only consistent Seattle starter in 2019, as he was 16–13 with a 3.99 ERA in 34 starts. In 203 innings, he struck out 147 batters and walked 56.

Prior to the 2020 season, Gonzales and the Mariners signed a four-year contract extension guaranteeing him $30 million, with a club option for 2025. In the pandemic-shortened 2020 season, Gonzales was named the Mariners' Opening Day starter for the second season in a row. On July 23, Gonzales started his first game of the season pitching 4 1/3 innings and giving up 3 earned runs on 73 pitches against the defending AL pennant winners, the Houston Astros. Gonzales's first start would be the shortest outing of his season as he would go on to pitch at least 5 innings per start for the remainder of the season. The 2020 season also included Gonzales's second-ever complete game when he pitched 9 innings, giving up 1 run and striking out 8 batters while throwing 102 pitches against the Los Angeles Angels on August 31.

Gonzales finished the season with a record of 7–2 and a 3.10 ERA in 11 starts. In the 60-game season, Gonzales finished in the top 5 for wins and walks plus hits per inning pitched, and in the top 20 for ERA and opponent batting average in all MLB for the first time in his career. He led the AL in walks per nine innings (0.904) and strikeout-to-walk ratio (9.143).

For the 2021 season, Gonzales was named the club's Opening Day starter for the third consecutive season. He started 25 games for the year, going 10–6 with a 3.96 ERA and 108 strikeouts over 143 1/3 innings.

==== 2022–2023 ====
In 2022, Gonzalez was 10–15 with a 4.15 ERA in 183 innings, in which he struck out 103 batters, as he led the league in losses and was third in home runs allowed (30). His strikeout percentage of 13.2% was the lowest among qualified pitchers in the majors.

After 10 starts for Seattle, Gonzales was placed on the injured list with a left forearm strain on June 3, 2023; an MRI later revealed a flexor strain. A week later, he began a throwing program but was shut down for two weeks at the end of the month after experiencing nerve issues in his elbow. Gonzales was transferred to the 60-day injured list on July 26. On August 13, it was announced that Gonzalez would undergo season-ending surgery to decompress a nerve in his forearm. He finished the year with a 4–1 record and 5.22 ERA with 34 strikeouts across 50 innings of work.

=== Pittsburgh Pirates ===
On December 3, 2023, the Mariners traded Gonzales, Jarred Kelenic, and Evan White to the Atlanta Braves for Jackson Kowar and Cole Phillips. Two days later, the Braves traded him to the Pittsburgh Pirates with cash considerations in exchange for a player to be named later. Gonzales began the 2024 season in Pittsburgh's rotation, making three starts and posting a 2.65 ERA with 11 strikeouts across 17 innings pitched. He was placed on the injured list with a left forearm muscle strain on April 14, 2024, and was transferred to the 60-day injured list on June 3. Gonzales was activated from the injured list on July 12. He returned to the 60-day injured list with a forearm strain on August 12, ending his season. In seven appearances on the season for Pittsburgh, Gonzales logged a 1–1 record and 4.54 ERA with 23 strikeouts over 33 2/3 innings pitched. On August 28, it was announced that Gonzales would undergo flexor surgery to address the injury. On November 4, the Pirates declined his option for 2025, making him a free agent.

=== San Diego Padres ===
After missing the 2025 season due to injury, Gonzales signed a minor league contract with the San Diego Padres on January 29, 2026. He began the season with the Triple-A El Paso Chihuahuas. In 13 games (12 starts), he struggled to a 7.99 ERA with 36 strikeouts in 47 1/3 innings of work. On June 16, Gonzales was released by the Padres.

=== Texas Rangers ===
On June 23, 2026, Gonzales signed a minor league contract with the Texas Rangers. He made four starts for the Triple-A Round Rock Express, posting a 1–0 record and 8.64 ERA with seven strikeouts across 16 2/3 innings pitched. On July 21, the Rangers selected Gonzales' contract, adding him to their active roster. In two appearances for the team, he recorded a 1.50 ERA with three strikeouts and one save across six innings pitched. Gonzales was designated for assignment by Texas on July 31. He cleared waivers and elected free agency on August 2. On August 7, the Rangers re-signed Gonzales on a minor league contract, and on August 9, he was activated by Triple-A Round Rock Express. Gonzales was selected back to the major league roster on August 14. He was designated for assignment the following day. Gonzales cleared waivers and elected free agency on August 18.

== Pitching profile ==
Gonzales throws a fastball between 88 and 91 miles per hour (142–146 km/h). He features a changeup that, as a prospect, was regarded as one of the best in his draft class. His command is above average, and he throws two different breaking pitches with his curveball being better than his slider. After his first MLB stint from June–July 2014, manager Mike Matheny advised him to add a curveball and cut fastball to keep hitters from focusing on his four-seam fastball and changeup.

== Personal life ==
Gonzales' father, Frank, played baseball at La Junta High School in La Junta, Colorado, leading it to a state championship in the 1980s. He went on to pitch at Colorado State University and was drafted in the 16th round by the Detroit Tigers in the 1989 MLB draft. He then played about ten years in the minor leagues, coached high school, and continued as a pitching coach for the Colorado Rockies’ Class A minor-league club, before being named manager of the Northern Colorado Owlz of the independent Pioneer League in 2023. Gonzales' mother is a firefighter. His brother also played baseball for Rocky Mountain High School. Gonzales grew up a Colorado Rockies fan.

Gonzales and his wife married in 2015. They welcomed their first child in June 2021. They live in Seattle year-round.

Gonzales' ancestry includes Mexican, Spanish, Italian, and Native American.

== Awards and honors ==
=== Major leagues ===
Award/honor	Dates (Ranking or event)	Refs
Seattle Mariners Most Valuable Pitcher	2019, 2020	

=== Minor leagues ===
Award/honor	Dates (Ranking or event)	Refs
Major League Baseball All-Star Futures Game	2014	
All-Star	2014 (Texas League midseason)	
Pitcher of the Week	June 15, 2014 (Texas League)	
St. Louis Cardinals Minor League Pitcher of the Year	2014	

=== Amateur ===
Award/honor	Dates (Ranking or event)	Refs
2012 Haarlem Baseball Week Best Pitcher	July 2012	
John Olerud Award	2013	
Third-team All-American	2011, 2012	
West Coast Conference Pitcher of the Year	2012	
West Coast Conference Co-Player of the Year	2011, 2013	
West Coast Conference Freshman of the Year	2011	
