= Pim Mulier =

Dutch sporting executive and versatile athlete

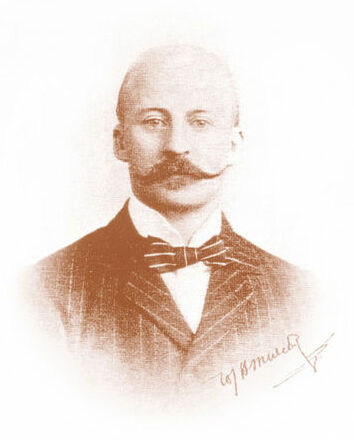
- Pim Mulier
- Born: Willem Johan Herman Mulier; 10 March 1865; Witmarsum, Netherlands
- Died: 12 April 1954 (aged 89); The Hague, Netherlands
- Citizenship: Dutch
- Occupations: Athlete; businessman
- Known for: The pioneer of modern sport in the Netherlands

Willem Johan Herman Mulier, also known as Pim Mulier (10 March 1865 – 12 April 1954) was one of the leading figures in the sporting history of the Netherlands.

He was a co-founder of the oldest football club still in existence in the Netherlands, Koninklijke HFC in 1879, and the founder of the first tennis club in the Netherlands in 1884. He also organized the first athletics competition in 1886 and he was the founder of the Dutch Football and Athletics Association in 1889, which became NVB within a few years when athletics was abandoned, much to his sorrow. In 1890 he ice skated past eleven cities in Friesland, which became a precursor to the Elfstedentocht, and he even designed the medal for participation himself. In 1891, Mulier, with the assistance of Charles Goodman Tebbutt, introduced bandy to the Netherlands and subsequently also introduced hockey, which emerged from that bandy. He was also involved in the founding of the International Skating Union, of which he was President from 1892 until 1895. Mulier was the major pioneer in establishing and promoting cricket and football in the Netherlands as he founded clubs in both sports. He was the first chairman of the Football Association, the Athletics Association, and of Koninklijke HFC, and the first secretary of the Dutch Association for Physical Education. Mulier was also instrumental in organizing events within various sports, such as the Eleven Cities Skating Tour in Friesland and the International Four Days Marches Nijmegen (both in 1909), which are currently among the largest sporting events in the Netherlands. He also played a major role in the founding of the Dutch Olympic Committee in 1912.

Besides being a sports pioneer, he was also known as an expert art collector, skilled draftsman, interior designer, painter, illustrator, journalist, language expert, and expert in the field of inland fishing. The importance of his work and his appreciation for it is evidenced by the numerous awards bestowed on him by governments, organizations, and associations, such as the Order of the Netherlands Lion and the Silver Carnations from the Prins Bernhard Cultuurfonds for the propaganda and related organizational work for many branches of sport.

== Early life ==
Willem Johan Herman Mulier was born on 10 March 1865 in the Frisian town of Witmarsum, and he grew up in a well-to-do, respectable family in Friesland. His father, Tjepke Mulier (1815–1883), was the last grietman (a sort of magistrate) in 1850–51 and a mayor of Wûnseradiel from 1851 until 1867. Although born in Witmarsum, Mulier preferred to pronounce his last name in French (Muljee), since his ancestors, called Oste des Muliers, came from the Roubaix area of France, near Lille in 1570, where they can be traced back as far as in 1319. An ancestor of the family, Jan Mulier, fought alongside Louis I, Prince of Condé, in the French Wars of Religion in the 16th century.

The family lived in his father's office at Aylva State in Tjepke's birthplace of Witmarsum until he was two years old, when they moved to Haarlem after his father failed to be re-elected as the mayor of Wûnseradiel. In 1869, his father founded the IJsclub Haarlem (Haarlem Ice Club) in Omstreken and in that same winter he instructed his servant and housekeeper to put the four-year-old Pim on skates in the ditch in front of the house to train speed skating together with his older brother Pieter and a house boy. From an early age, Pim was passionate about sports. He practiced a lot of them while growing up and thus developed into an all-around athlete who competes in different sports such as football, skating, running, cycling, tennis, cricket, and bandy. He also attended the gymnasium in Haarlem.

After completing primary school, Mulier was sent to England to complete his studies there, doing so in a college at Ramsgate. He later graduated from a trade school (Commercial Institute) in Lübeck and worked for some time in the timber trade in Scandinavia and also traveled through Russia on behalf of a plant bulb grower. During this time he learned several languages, from which he later benefited as a sports official. While studying in Sweden, he learned to hunt with the Sámi and to ski, and he even improved some of their best ski times.

Mulier was the youngest of five children, two of whom died in infancy. All three Mulier children also worked as draftsmen and attended art schools, and likewise, his sister Eldina later became a respected artist and had her very own studio, while Mulier himself trained in painting and drawing under the guidance of Ferdinand Oldewelt. Afterwards, he was engaged in making illustrations for Eigen Haard and Elsevier, among others. The subjects of his paintings and illustrations revolved around landscape, portrait, history, and cityscape.

== Sporting career ==
=== Football ===
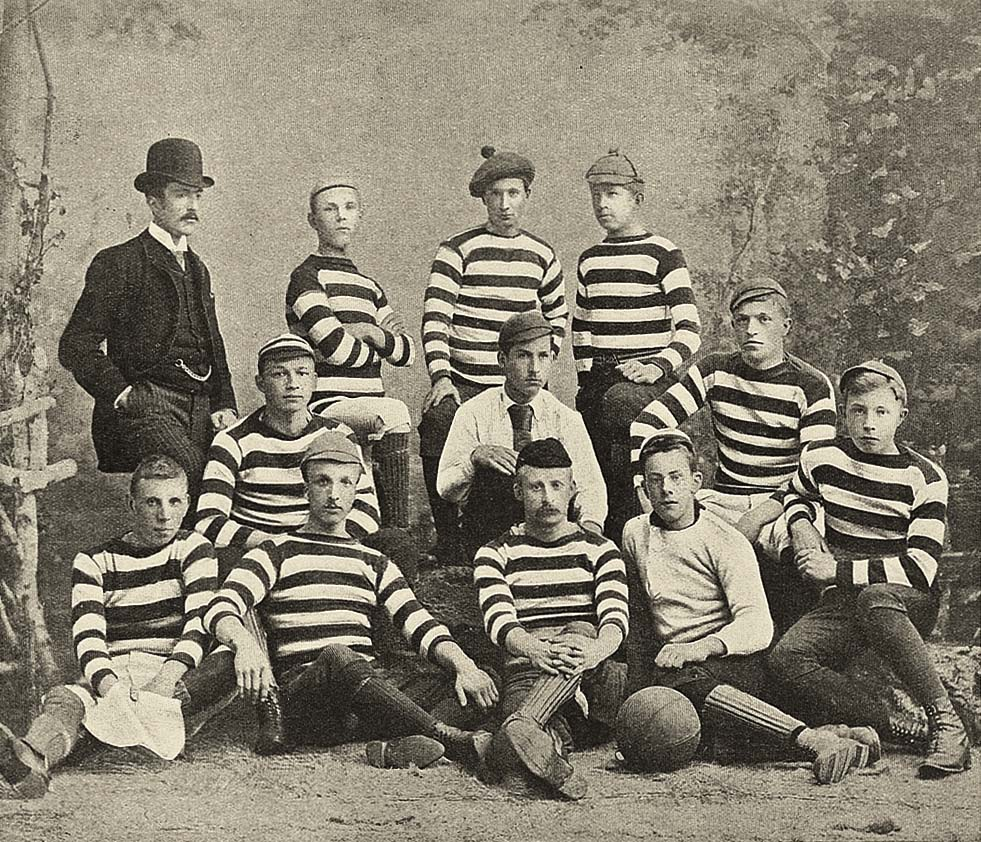
Team photo of the Koninklijke HFC from 1887, with Mulier (front, black cap)

Pim Mulier had his first contact with football while studying at Ramsgate in England, and he quickly developed an interest in the sport as he become one of the best youth players of the college. Mulier became so fascinated by this sport that upon his return to Haarlem in 1879, he taught his friends the rules of football. Later that year, on 15 September, when he was aged just 14 years and 185 days, Mulier initiated the foundation of the oldest football club still in existence in the Netherlands, as he co-founded Haarlemsche Football Club (HFC) with a number of peers, doing it so as a fourteen-year-old schoolboy. (Note: Even though it has long been assumed that Mulier and some friends founded Koninklijke HFC in 1879, the Dutch historians Jan Luitzen and Wim Zonneveld showed evidence that this might be incorrect and that HFC was probably only founded in December 1882, without Muller's presence.) Mulier then found a meadow in the Koekamp that seemed suitable for football and thus he wrote a letter to the mayor of Haarlem to ask permission to use it to play football with his club, an unprecedented initiative in the Netherlands at the time. After negotiations were held, the mayor gave them permission to use it "as a wrestling arena for Pim Mulier and his companions" ("worstelstrijdperk voor Pim Mulier en zijn kornuiten"), and he used the term "wrestling arena" because initially, the members of HFC played football according to the rugby rules of the game, but from 1883 onwards, it was mainly football according to English rules. The surface of the Koekamp, where their "wrestling arena" was located, was uneven and there were a few trees in the middle of the field, but they just got used to it and played around it. In 1886 he organized the first football match within the German borders.

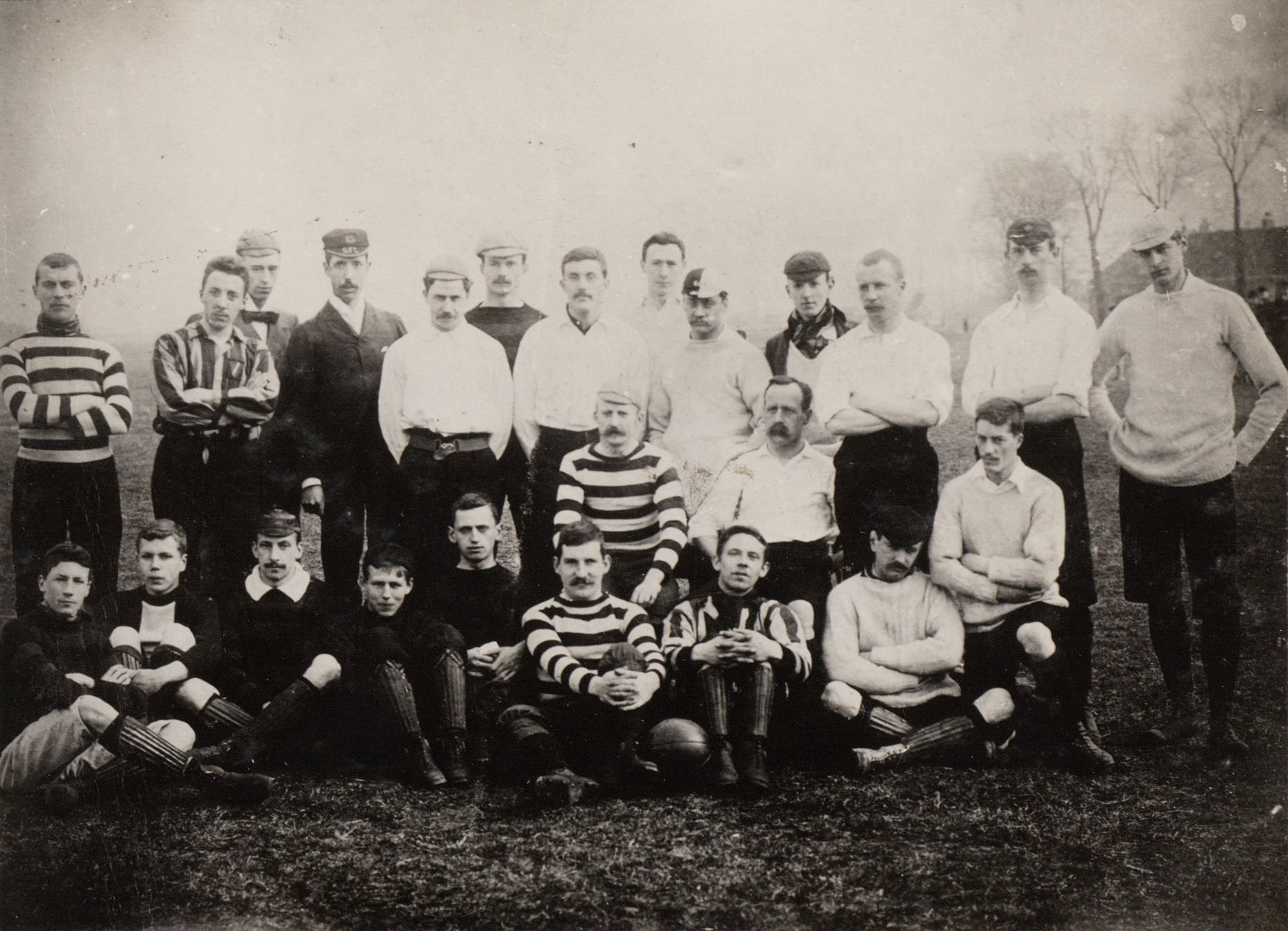
Mulier as captain of the unofficial Dutch national team in a match against Maidstone in 1895.

Mulier became the leader of the club "as a matter of course", and his fellow campaigners called him meneer (sir) Mulier. Mulier would later become HFC's honorary president and patron. On 10 April 1894, he was the first player of Koninklijke HFC to play in the then unofficial Netherlands national football team in a friendly match against a ragtag team called Maidstone FC, scoring twice in a 4–3 win. In 1895 he earned a second cap for bondselftal, as the Dutch national team was called until its official inception in 1905.

In addition to football and speed skating, Mulier also played tennis, track and field, and bandy. He also practiced billiards, cricket, and hunting, and was a lover of fishing.

=== Athletics ===
In 1885, Pim trained until he could cover the distance between the Haarlemmer Poort in Amsterdam and the Amsterdamse Poort in Haarlem (more than 16 kilometers) within an hour. In 1886 Pim was at the basis of the first 'official' athletics competition in the Netherlands, which was just a running race held on the grounds behind the Rijksmuseum on 16 December. It was therefore almost inevitable that he became the first chairman of the Dutch Football and Athletics Association (Nederlandse Atletiek en Voetbal Bond, NVAB), which was co-founded by him on 8 December 1889, and he led NVAB for almost three years. In 1886 he became Dutch champion in the 350 meters and two years later he won the mile event in Ostend. During the first athletics competitions organized by NVAB in 1891, he became the Dutch champion in the quarter mile.

The NVAB kept prospering, but when both branches of sport started to develop, he could no longer keep up with both of them, and thus, the NVAB fell apart in September 1895 and continued only as a football association (NVB), while the Dutch Athletic Association (Nederlandsche Athletiek Bond, NAB) was founded in 1896 at Pim's insistence. By the end of the 19th century, physical education was based on the German model, which emphasized gymnastics and physical exercises. Many people, including Mulier, did not like that, so he set up his own sports clubs, such as the NVAB, NVB, and NAB, which were mostly based on the English model, which he had experienced while studying there. Also in the 1890s, Mulier was regularly asked to act as interim chairman of various sports associations, leaving one chairman position for the other. When the NVB faced organizational difficulties, he took up the chairmanship again, until he found a capable successor in Jasper Warner from Zwolle in 1897.

=== Skating ===
On 26 February 1888, he and his friend Klaas Pander participated in the International Distance Trial for Amateurs, which was held between Haarlem and Leiden on the Leidsche Trekvaart, which means that about thirty kilometers had to be driven. It was the first long-distance skating competition ever held and Mulier was beaten only by Pander, who drove 3 minutes and 15 seconds faster than his friend. Mulier then participated in the very first edition of the World Allround Speed Skating Championships in 1889, and did it again in 1891, with both editions being held in Amsterdam and both having an unofficial status as the first official edition only came in 1893. In 1890, during the long and harsh winter of 1890–91, the 25-year-old Mulier become the first man to ride the so-called Frisian Elfstedentocht, which is completing a skating tour along the eleven Frisian cities, something that he achieved in just 12 hours and 55 minutes, an unofficial record for a long time. This organized tour would eventually become an organized competition in 1909, partly on the initiative of Mulier himself. Remarkably, he was not present in the inaugural tournament in 1909 and was also absent from the roll call in 1912, but he participated in the third edition of the Elfstedentocht, on 27 January 1917, at the age of 51, and he was able to complete it, thus achieving the cross that he himself had designed in 1909. Later that day, he gave a speech during the award ceremony and carried out the kick-off with Janna van der Weg, who was the only woman to complete the tour.

As a great skating enthusiast, Mulier was thus involved in the establishment of the International Skating Union (ISU) in 1892, and was elected as its first chairman, a position he served until 1895, when he was replaced by the Swedish Viktor Balck. During the establishment of the ISU, fixed skating distances were established so that international competition was possible. This is how the 1893 World Allround Speed Skating Championships, which was the first official world speed skating championship (over four distances), was organized in Amsterdam on the ice rink behind the Rijksmuseum, near the exact same grounds where he had helped organize the first 'official' athletics competition in the Netherlands in 1886. The success of the 1893 Skating championships exceeded expectations and more than 125 years later, the World Allround Championships still exist in exactly the same format as in 1893: with a four-Athlon event on the 500, 1500, 5000, and 10,000 meters. This makes it the oldest surviving World Cup of any type in the world.

He was important not because he did things first, but because he had a certain vision of the sport. That vision was that sport can be a social force. This distinguishes him from his contemporaries, who saw sport mainly as a pleasant pastime for themselves and their friends.

— Daniel Rewijk in Mulier's biography

=== Bandy ===
In 1891, Mulier, with the assistance of Charles Goodman Tebbutt, which he had met in 1883 in Ramsgate, introduced bandy (a combination of football and hockey played on ice) to the Netherlands. Bandy quickly became Mulier's favorite game, stating "Bandy is my favorite place to hang out because it is the fastest game in the world, faster than football, baseball or lacrosse, it is spicier than cricket, tennis or golf, so with the bandy agreement, our beloved game is near". After some correspondence back and forth it was the beginning of January 1891. On 3 January, the Bury Fen Bandy Club took the boat from Harwich to the Netherlands. Tebbutt and Mulier wanted to play three demonstration competitions to introduce the Netherlands to bandy. To this end, they added Bandy to the skating clubs of Amsterdam and Haarlem and then recruit members who were willing to go through the schedule of both jobs. On 5 January, the first bandy competition in the Netherlands was held in Haarlem, which was thus also the first international bandy competition. The very first match of bandy in the Netherlands was then played, taking place under the watchful eye of a large audience on a frozen pond, where the Haarlem formation led by Mulier completely trashed Haarlem with a resounding 14–1 win.

=== Hockey, Tennis, and Cricket ===
Hockey would eventually emerge from that bandy. Hockey only started to be played in the Netherlands when the frost-free winters made playing bandy impossible. Mulier himself was not interested in hockey at all as loved Bandy much more. Dutch hockey was born on the grounds near Rijksmuseum, on 7 February 1892, with a match held between the Bandy Club that had been founded by Mulier and Tebbutt, and the Amsterdamsche Hockey, which was just one week old, and who had found twelve people to participate.

In 1884 he founded the first Dutch tennis club in Haarlem, the Haarlemse Lawn-TennisClub. He was also chairman of the Dutch Cricket Association in 1893. Mulier was the major pioneer in establishing and promoting cricket in the Netherlands as he founded clubs in this sport.

=== Recreational walking ===
When the Nederlandse Bond voor Lichamelijke Opvoeding (a grassroots sport organization mainly for hiking) was founded in 1907, Pim Mulier was appointed to represent the sport. On 3 April 1908, Mulier played a crucial role in the founding of the Dutch Association for Physical Education (NBvLO), and Mulier became the first secretary of that union, which was created with the aim of promoting and holding competitions in physical exercise. Although the NBvLO initially profiled itself as a general sports association that initiated and organized various sports activities and physical exercises, the entity ended up focusing mainly on sporting and recreational walking, and as such, it was the cradle of the largest and best-known walking event in the Netherlands, the International Four Days Marches Nijmegen. He also played a major role in the founding of the Dutch Olympic Committee in 1912, through his role as secretary of the NBvLO.

== Other activities ==
Mulier laid at his villa in The Hague an impressive botanical garden, which even students from Wageningen are drawn to come to this day. He was also a fervent collector of antique glass, and he left an extensive collection at the Hague Municipal Museum.

== Journalism ==
Pim Mulier's versatility showed itself not only in sports, but also in other social areas. In 1888 he co-founded the sports magazine Het Sportblad, of which he became the first editor. This was a modern magazine for that time, which was supported by thirty associations. He created this magazine not only to blow his own trumpet, but also to promote organized sport at an administrative level, and in fact, Mulier used the magazine to seek support for the establishment of a new sports association. He was convinced of the need for comprehensive sports organizations so that rules were unified and national and international competitions were possible. That worked as the Dutch Football and Athletics Association was created in the following year in 1889. He also published three influential books on sports at the end of the 19th century: Wintersport (1893), Athletiek en Voetbal (1894), and CricketWinter sports (1897). His second book "Athletics and Football" (Haarlem, 1894) testifies to his love for both sports. The magazine would become the official organ of the NVB.

At the turn of the century, Mulier developed ideas on his own initiative for a new bill on freshwater fisheries. He presented a sketch to Cornelis Jacob Sickesz, Director-General of Agriculture, who incorporated Mulier's thoughts into a new law. Shortly afterwards, he published Vischkweekerij en conservation van den vischstand (Haarlem, 1900).

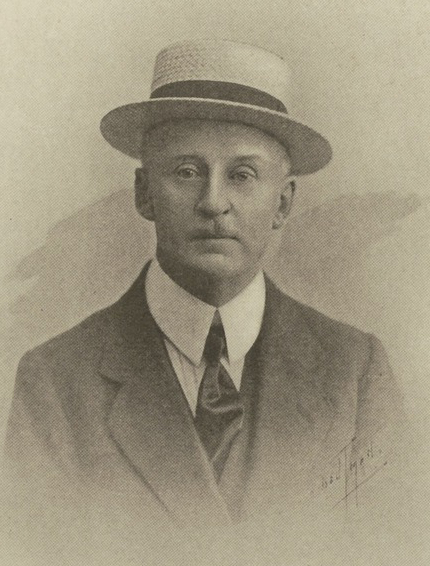
Pim Mulier in the 1920s

Due to his good background, Pim did not have to work to earn a living, and in fact, he only had one paid job throughout his life. In 1899, he moved to the Dutch East Indies where he was editor-in-chief of the Deli Courant for almost six years until 1905. Shortly after his arrival, he founded the soccer club Sportclub Sumatra's Oostkust with two Dutch plantation workers. Contrary to the usual customs in the colony, this association was multicultural. At that time he published on labor conditions in Sumatra and the measures that had to be taken to subjugate and develop that area. In the field of journalism, he had a sharp eye and a skillful pen. He was also skillful in drawing, as evidenced by the many illustrations accompanying his own articles and books. Despite his journalist prowess, he hated interviews all his life, and hence the lack of information about his personal inner workings.

In addition to his journalistic activities, he wrote and published several other books under the pseudonym Pim Pernel, which he had used since 1935 as an alias for Het Vaderland. Under that pseudonym, he wrote travelogues, Belles-lettres, and newspaper columns in Handelsblad and Het Vaderland. In a column to Flaneur, he campaigned against the "absolute dependency of married women". He found it "nonsensical" that "female people" had fewer rights than men in legal matters. He also advocated women's suffrage and admired the women's rights activists Aletta Jacobs and Cornélie Huygens. One of his closest friends was the writer Arij Prins, who was as enthusiastic about sports as Mulier. After having made a study trip through British India from 1905 to 1907, he returned to the Netherlands in the last year and was approached as an editor for Indies affairs at the Algemeen Handelsblad.

== Philosophy ==
Pim Mulier was a practical man. In his own words, he "liked to hammer things together". Thus he pioneered work for various branches of sport, which he has always regarded as a means of good development of body and character and a noble form of leisure. To him, sport was an instrument of nationalism: it contributed towards strength, vitality and character of a "Young Holland". A fit population with a sense of responsibility would be able to preserve the Netherlands as a colonial power.

On 12 March 2015, two days after the 150th anniversary of Mulier's birth, Daniël Rewijk obtained his PhD at the University of Groningen on a dissertation and biography about Pim Mulier. In his biography, Rewijk argues that after 1910 Mulier lost interest in developing sports in the Netherlands because he was disappointed by the rapid changes in society. "He became a reactionary, ranting about the 'excesses' of modernity, such as automobilism and abstract art. He entrenched himself in a lifestyle that emphasized the past, protected from the advance of 'the people', the mass media and rough manners."

Mulier has always been an opponent of mixing professional and amateur sports. In the late 19th and early 20th centuries, it was not uncommon for athletes to receive money or valuables for winning a match. This was especially the case in short-track speed skating and hard sailing. These prices were a welcome addition to their meager income for farmers, workers, and skippers. Mulier believed that sport should be practiced for sport itself and not for profit. The 'true' sport was practiced by amateurs or enthusiasts. Pim Mulier stood firm for the principle of 'fair play'. He believed that the game should be fair by observing the rules and sportsmanship. Later he regularly looked back to the early years of the sport, which, according to him, were characterized by less roughness of the game, more respect, and a sportier attitude on the part of the practitioner.

== Personal life ==
Mulier's departure from the Netherlands in 1899 was preceded by family disputes: at first, his mother, now widowed, had rejected his new marriage in 1895 as she considered it a "mesalliance". His brother Pieter led a "frivolous" life as a single bon vivant and his sister Eldina feared that the family tradition of lucrative marriages would not be continued. His mother died in 1898, after which Pim Mulier and his sister had a falling out, probably because of inheritance disputes.

His wife Cornelia Constance, born von Duin, was a former maid. Mulier's marriage ended in divorce after around 25 years, and one of the reasons for the failure was the lack of children. Mulier married his grandniece Maria Louise Haitsma Mulier in his second marriage, but this marriage also remained without children.

== Death ==
Pim was still in or next to the sports field until old age. Pim Mulier died in The Hague on 12 April 1954, at the age of 89 years old. He was buried on 15 April at The Hague General Cemetery. Numerous sports officials from the associations that Mulier had founded spoke at the funeral, such as Royal Dutch Speed Skating Association (KNSB), chairman Mr. Vliegen, who paid tribute to him. At the head of the funeral procession, he strode stately to his final resting place. In his hands, he carried a velvet cushion bearing all the decorations that Pim Mulier had received in his life.

== Legacy ==
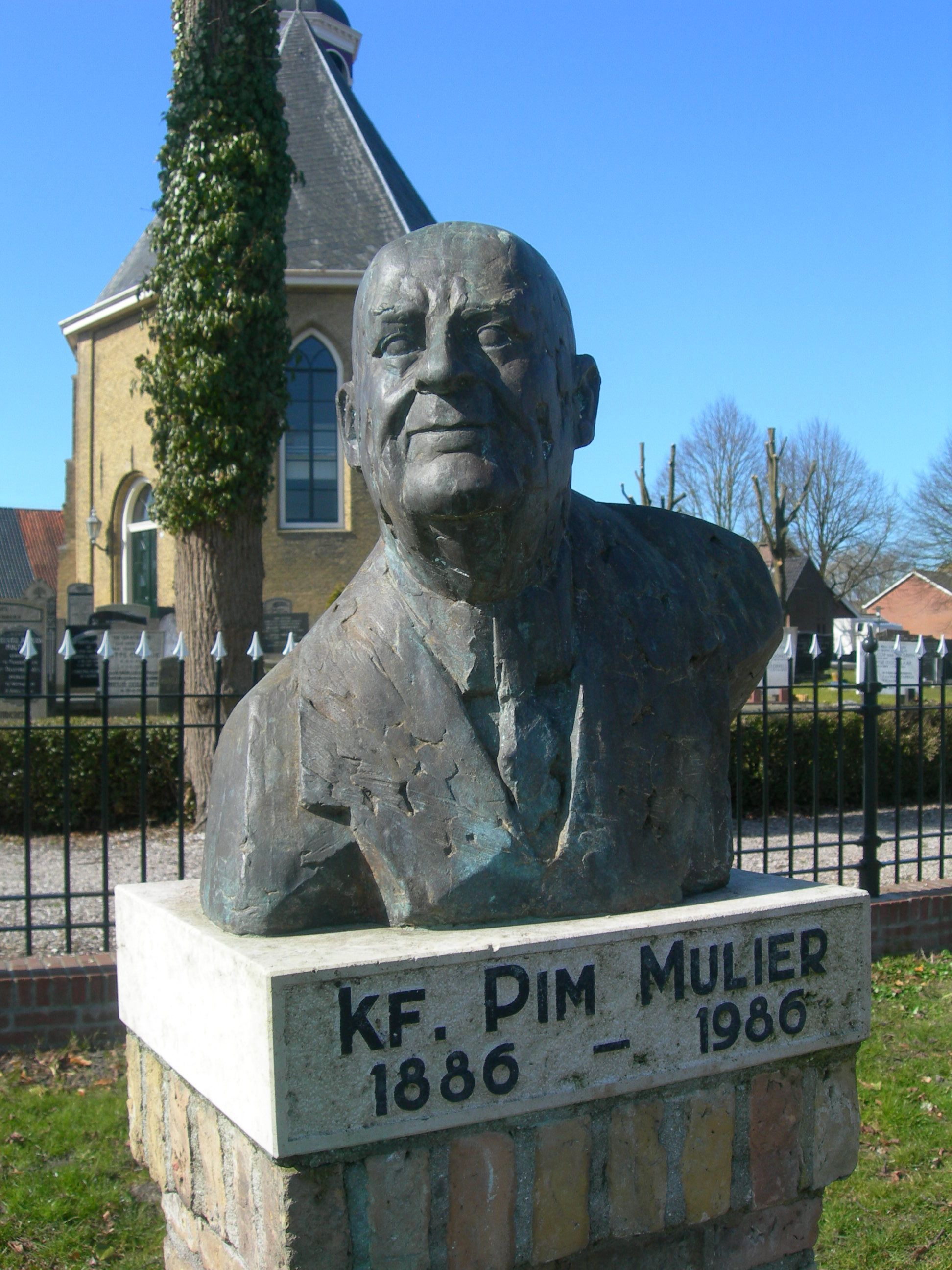
Bust of Mulier in front of the church of Witmarsum (The figures do not refer to his life dates but to the existence of the association KF Pim Mulier.)

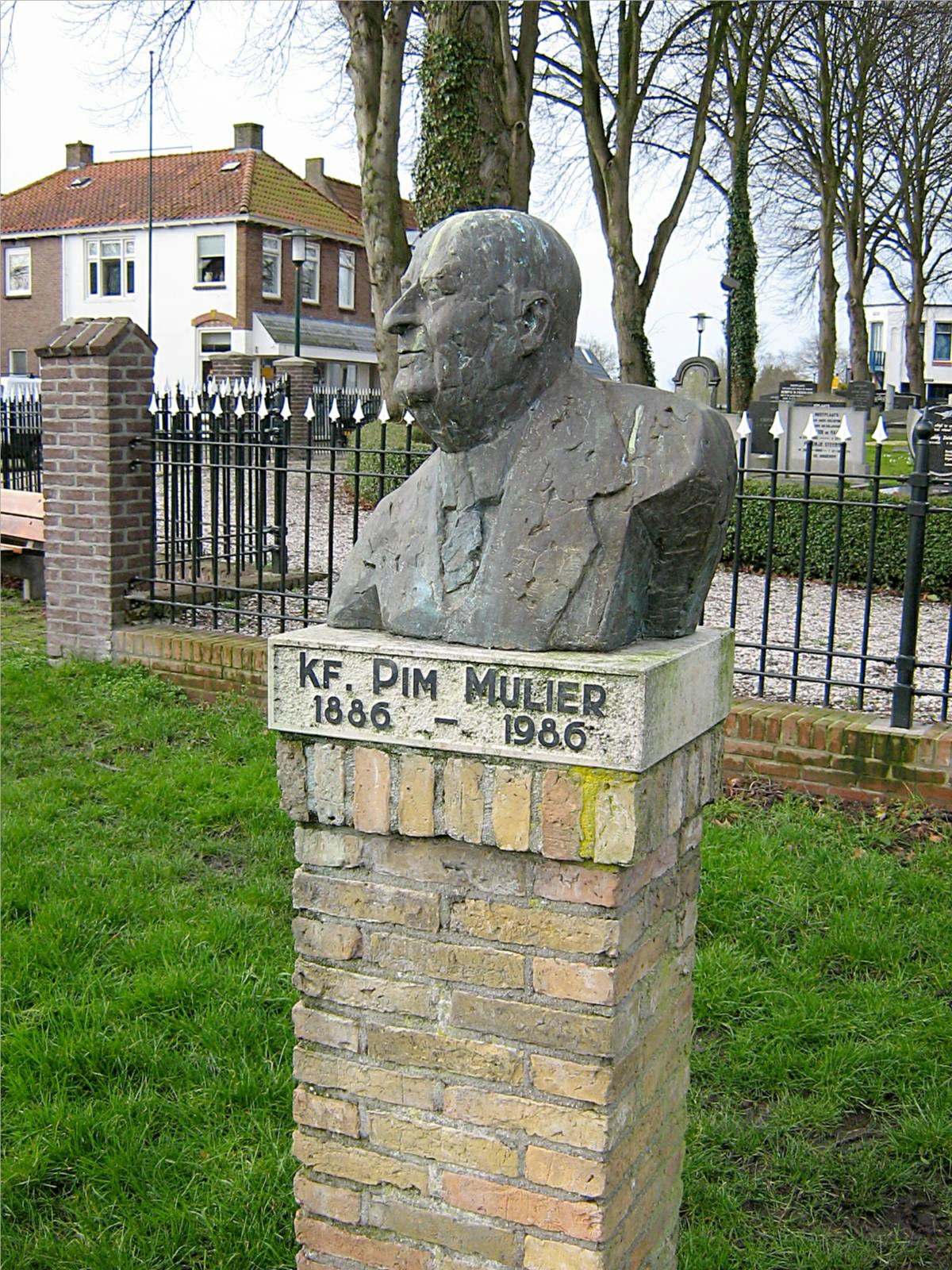
Bust of Mulier in Witmarsum

For his merits in sports, he was awarded various honorary positions since he was appointed honorary member or honorary president of various associations and federations in football, athletics, skating, handball, and cricket. Mulier has often been awarded for his efforts as a director and organizer, being appointed for the Order of the Netherlands Lion in 1940, honorary citizen of the municipality of Wonseradeel in 1950, which includes his birthplace Witmarsum, and received one of the first Silver Carnations from the Prins Bernhard Cultuurfonds for the propaganda and related organizational work for many branches of sport.

A bronze statue with a bust of plaster and painted gold of Pim Mulier stands in Witmarssum, Mulier's native village. The sculpture was made by the artist Frank M. Zeilstra and placed on the occasion of the 100th anniversary of the Keatsferiening Pim Mulier in 1986. In 2015, in celebration of Mulier's 150th birthday, numerous sports activities were organized from 10 March, when the kick-off was given at the Grote Markt in Haarlem, until November.

Nowadays, many organizations in the Netherlands that have something to do with sports are named after Mulier, such as clubs, sports fields, and other sporting institutions. In Haarlem alone, for example, there is a stadium, the street next to it, and the tennis association Pim Mulier. There is also a Pim Mulier Open tennis tournament. In addition, Amsterdam, Zwolle, Stiens, Franeker, and Sneek all have streets named after Mulier; with the Sneek Sport center being located on the Pim Mulierstraat. The winner of the Elfstedentocht receives the Pim Mulier exchange prize. There is even a Hospital health care company based in Arnhem named after him. In 1985, the Pim Mulier Foundation, a national organization in the field of health management, was founded, with the purpose of improving the vitality of employees, teams, and organizations, beginning at the National Sports Centre Papendal. On 12 April 2002, the independent, non-profit Mulier Instituut was opened in Utrecht, which studies sport from a social science perspective.

== Notes ==
Sporting positions
Preceded by Unpreceeded	President of the International Skating Union; 1892–1894	Succeeded by Viktor Balck
