= List of 2016 Summer Olympics medal winners =

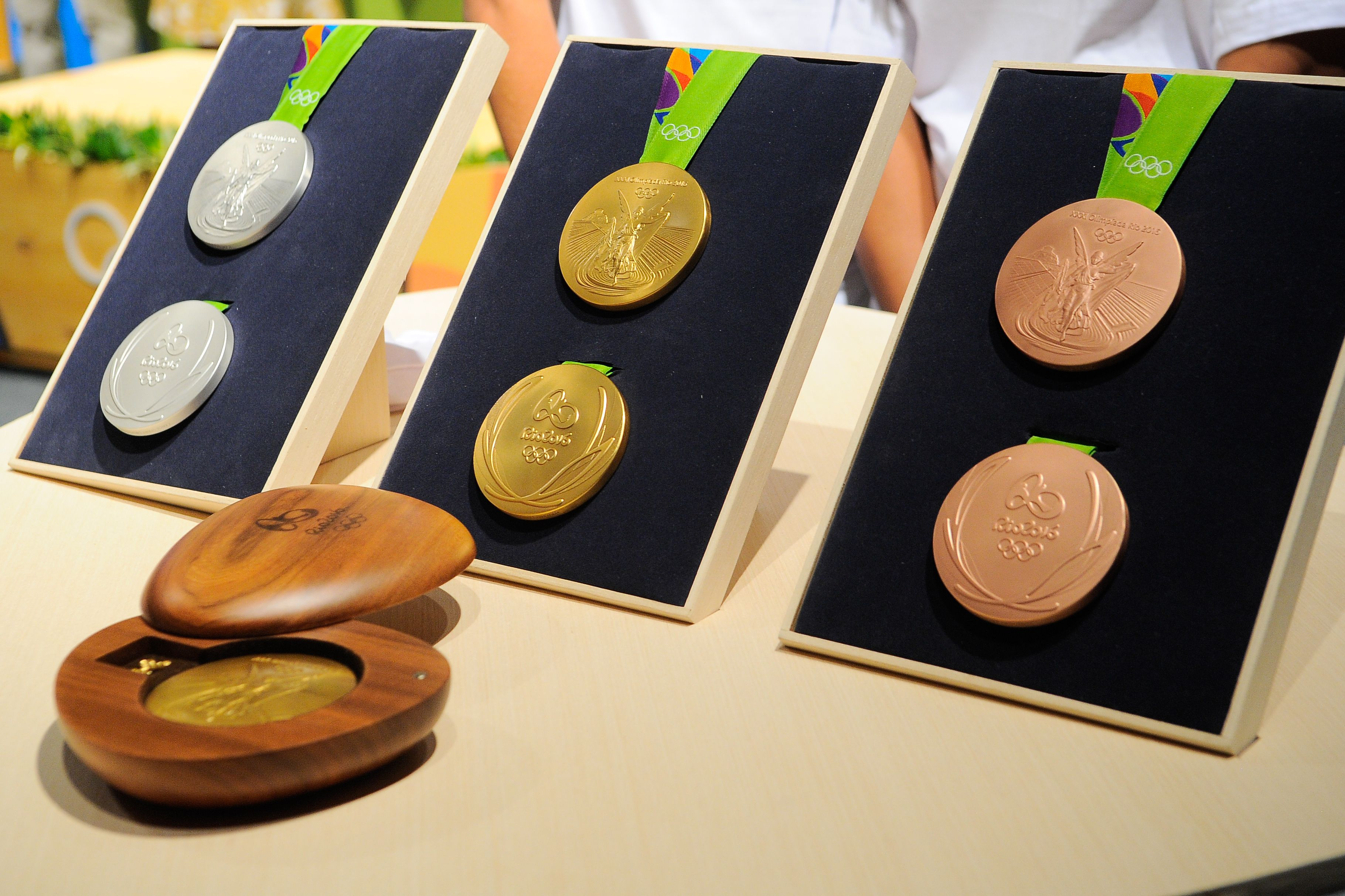
Representative set of the Olympic medals presented

The 2016 Summer Olympics, officially known as the Games of the XXXI Olympiad, were held in Rio de Janeiro, Brazil, from 5 August 2016 to 21 August 2016.

Approximately 11,000 athletes from 206 nations participated in 306 events in 42 Olympic sport disciplines.

== Archery ==
Event	Gold	Silver	Bronze
Men's individual	Ku Bon-chan; South Korea	Jean-Charles Valladont; France	Brady Ellison; United States
Men's team	South Korea; Ku Bon-chan; Lee Seung-yun; Kim Woo-jin	United States; Brady Ellison; Zach Garrett; Jake Kaminski	Australia; Alec Potts; Ryan Tyack; Taylor Worth
Women's individual	Chang Hye-jin; South Korea	Lisa Unruh; Germany	Ki Bo-bae; South Korea
Women's team	South Korea; Chang Hye-jin; Choi Mi-sun; Ki Bo-bae	Russia; Tuyana Dashidorzhieva; Ksenia Perova; Inna Stepanova	Chinese Taipei; Le Chien-ying; Lin Shih-chia; Tan Ya-ting

== Athletics ==
(WR = World Record, OR = Olympic Record)

=== Men ===
Event	Gold		Silver		Bronze	
100 metres	Usain Bolt; Jamaica	9.81	Justin Gatlin; United States	9.89	Andre De Grasse; Canada	9.91
200 metres	Usain Bolt; Jamaica	19.78	Andre De Grasse; Canada	20.02	Christophe Lemaitre; France	20.12
400 metres	Wayde van Niekerk; South Africa	43.03 WR	Kirani James; Grenada	43.76	LaShawn Merritt; United States	43.85
800 metres	David Rudisha; Kenya	1:42.15	Taoufik Makhloufi; Algeria	1:42.61 NR	Clayton Murphy; United States	1:42.85
1500 metres	Matthew Centrowitz Jr. United States	3:50.00	Taoufik Makhloufi; Algeria	3:50.11	Nick Willis; New Zealand	3:50.24
5000 metres	Mo Farah; Great Britain	13:03.30	Paul Kipkemoi Chelimo; United States	13:03.90	Hagos Gebrhiwet; Ethiopia	13:04.35
10,000 metres	Mo Farah; Great Britain	27:05.17	Paul Tanui; Kenya	27:05.64 SB	Tamirat Tola; Ethiopia	27:06.26
110 metres hurdles	Omar McLeod; Jamaica	13.05	Orlando Ortega; Spain	13.17	Dimitri Bascou; France	13.24
400 metres hurdles	Kerron Clement; United States	47.73	Boniface Mucheru Tumuti; Kenya	47.78	Yasmani Copello; Turkey	47.92
3000 metres steeplechase	Conseslus Kipruto; Kenya	8:03.28 OR	Evan Jager; United States	8:04.28	Mahiedine Mekhissi-Benabbad; France	8:11.52
4 × 100 metres relay	Jamaica; Asafa Powell; Yohan Blake; Nickel Ashmeade; Usain Bolt; Jevaughn Minzie*; Kemar Bailey-Cole*	37.27	Japan; Ryota Yamagata; Shota Iizuka; Yoshihide Kiryu; Asuka Cambridge	37.60 AR	Canada; Akeem Haynes; Aaron Brown; Brendon Rodney; Andre De Grasse; Mobolade Ajomale*	37.64 NR
4 × 400 metres relay	United States; Arman Hall; Tony McQuay; Gil Roberts; LaShawn Merritt; Kyle Clemons*; David Verburg*	2:57.30	Jamaica; Peter Matthews; Nathon Allen; Fitzroy Dunkley; Javon Francis; Rusheen McDonald*	2:58.16	Bahamas; Alonzo Russell; Michael Mathieu; Steven Gardiner; Chris Brown; Stephen Newbold*	2:58.49
Marathon	Eliud Kipchoge; Kenya	2:08:44	Feyisa Lilesa; Ethiopia	2:09:54	Galen Rupp; United States	2:10:05
20 kilometres walk	Wang Zhen; China	1:19:14	Cai Zelin; China	1:19:26	Dane Bird-Smith; Australia	1:19:37
50 kilometres walk	Matej Tóth; Slovakia	3:40:58	Jared Tallent; Australia	3:41:16	Hirooki Arai; Japan	3:41:24
High jump	Derek Drouin; Canada	2.38 m	Mutaz Essa Barshim; Qatar	2.36 m	Bohdan Bondarenko; Ukraine	2.33 m
Pole vault	Thiago Braz da Silva; Brazil	6.03 m OR	Renaud Lavillenie; France	5.98 m	Sam Kendricks; United States	5.85 m
Long jump	Jeff Henderson; United States	8.38 m SB	Luvo Manyonga; South Africa	8.37 m PB	Greg Rutherford; Great Britain	8.29 m
Triple jump	Christian Taylor; United States	17.86 m	Will Claye; United States	17.76 m	Dong Bin; China	17.58 m
Shot put	Ryan Crouser; United States	22.52 m OR	Joe Kovacs; United States	21.78 m	Tomas Walsh; New Zealand	21.36 m
Discus throw	Christoph Harting; Germany	68.37 m PB	Piotr Małachowski; Poland	67.55 m	Daniel Jasinski; Germany	67.05 m
Hammer throw	Dilshod Nazarov; Tajikistan	78.68 m	Ivan Tikhon; Belarus	77.79 m	Wojciech Nowicki; Poland	77.73 m
Javelin throw	Thomas Röhler; Germany	90.30 m	Julius Yego; Kenya	88.24 m	Keshorn Walcott; Trinidad and Tobago	85.38 m
Decathlon	Ashton Eaton; United States	8893 pts OR	Kevin Mayer; France	8834 pts NR	Damian Warner; Canada	8666 pts
WR world record | AR area record | CR championship record | GR games record | NR national record | OR Olympic record | PB personal best | SB season best | WL world leading (in a given season)

* Indicates the athlete only competed in the preliminary heats and received medals.

=== Women ===
Event	Gold		Silver		Bronze	
100 metres	Elaine Thompson; Jamaica	10.71	Tori Bowie; United States	10.83	Shelly-Ann Fraser-Pryce; Jamaica	10.86 SB
200 metres	Elaine Thompson; Jamaica	21.78	Dafne Schippers; Netherlands	21.88	Tori Bowie; United States	22.15
400 metres	Shaunae Miller; Bahamas	49.44	Allyson Felix; United States	49.51	Shericka Jackson; Jamaica	49.85
800 metres	Caster Semenya; South Africa	1:55.28 NR	Francine Niyonsaba; Burundi	1:56.49	Margaret Wambui; Kenya	1:56.89
1500 metres	Faith Kipyegon; Kenya	4:08.92	Genzebe Dibaba; Ethiopia	4:10.27	Jennifer Simpson; United States	4:10.53
5000 metres	Vivian Cheruiyot; Kenya	14:26.17 OR	Hellen Onsando Obiri; Kenya	14:29.77	Almaz Ayana; Ethiopia	14:33.59
10,000 metres	Almaz Ayana; Ethiopia	29:17.45 WR	Vivian Cheruiyot; Kenya	29:32.53 NR	Tirunesh Dibaba; Ethiopia	29:42.56
100 metres hurdles	Brianna Rollins; United States	12.48	Nia Ali; United States	12.59	Kristi Castlin; United States	12.61
400 metres hurdles	Dalilah Muhammad; United States	53.13	Sara Petersen; Denmark	53.55 NR	Ashley Spencer; United States	53.72
3000 metres steeplechase	Ruth Jebet; Bahrain	8:59.75 AR	Hyvin Jepkemoi; Kenya	9:07.12	Emma Coburn; United States	9:07.63 AR
4 × 100 metres relay	United States; Tianna Bartoletta; Allyson Felix; English Gardner; Tori Bowie; Morolake Akinosun*	41.02	Jamaica; Christania Williams; Elaine Thompson; Veronica Campbell-Brown; Shelly-Ann Fraser-Pryce; Simone Facey*; Shashalee Forbes*	41.36	Great Britain; Asha Philip; Desirèe Henry; Dina Asher-Smith; Daryll Neita	41.77 NR
4 × 400 metres relay	United States; Allyson Felix; Phyllis Francis; Natasha Hastings; Courtney Okolo; Taylor Ellis-Watson*; Francena McCorory*	3:19.06	Jamaica; Stephenie Ann McPherson; Anneisha McLaughlin-Whilby; Shericka Jackson; Novlene Williams-Mills; Christine Day*; Chrisann Gordon*	3:20.34	Great Britain; Eilidh Doyle; Anyika Onuora; Emily Diamond; Christine Ohuruogu; Kelly Massey*	3:25.88
Marathon	Jemima Sumgong; Kenya	2:24.04	Eunice Kirwa; Bahrain	2:24.13	Mare Dibaba; Ethiopia	2:24.30
20 kilometres walk	Liu Hong; China	1:28:35	María Guadalupe González; Mexico	1:28:37	Lü Xiuzhi; China	1:28:42
High jump	Ruth Beitia; Spain	1.97 m	Mirela Demireva; Bulgaria	1.97 m	Blanka Vlašić; Croatia	1.97 m
Pole vault	Ekaterini Stefanidi; Greece	4.85 m	Sandi Morris; United States	4.85 m	Eliza McCartney; New Zealand	4.80 m =NR
Long jump	Tianna Bartoletta; United States	7.17 m	Brittney Reese; United States	7.15 m	Ivana Španović; Serbia	7.08 m NR
Triple jump	Caterine Ibargüen; Colombia	15.17 m	Yulimar Rojas; Venezuela	14.98 m	Olga Rypakova; Kazakhstan	14.74 m
Shot put	Michelle Carter; United States	20.63 m	Valerie Adams; New Zealand	20.42 m	Anita Márton; Hungary	19.87 m
Discus throw	Sandra Perković; Croatia	69.21 m	Mélina Robert-Michon; France	66.73 m NR	Denia Caballero; Cuba	65.34 m
Hammer throw	Anita Włodarczyk; Poland	82.29 m WR	Zhang Wenxiu; China	76.75 m	Sophie Hitchon; Great Britain	74.54 m NR
Javelin throw	Sara Kolak; Croatia	66.18 m NR	Sunette Viljoen; South Africa	64.92 m	Barbora Špotáková; Czech Republic	64.80 m
Heptathlon	Nafissatou Thiam; Belgium	6810 pts AR	Jessica Ennis-Hill; Great Britain	6775 pts SB	Brianne Theisen-Eaton; Canada	6653 pts
WR world record | AR area record | CR championship record | GR games record | NR national record | OR Olympic record | PB personal best | SB season best | WL world leading (in a given season)

* Indicates the athlete only competed in the preliminary heats and received medals.

== Badminton ==
Event	Gold	Silver	Bronze
Men's singles	Chen Long; China	Lee Chong Wei; Malaysia	Viktor Axelsen; Denmark
Men's doubles	Zhang Nan and Fu Haifeng (CHN)	Goh V Shem and Tan Wee Kiong (MAS)	Chris Langridge and Marcus Ellis (GBR)
Women's singles	Carolina Marín; Spain	P. V. Sindhu; India	Nozomi Okuhara; Japan
Women's doubles	Misaki Matsutomo and Ayaka Takahashi (JPN)	Christinna Pedersen and Kamilla Rytter Juhl (DEN)	Jung Kyung-eun and Shin Seung-chan (KOR)
Mixed doubles	Tontowi Ahmad and Liliyana Natsir (INA)	Chan Peng Soon and Goh Liu Ying (MAS)	Zhang Nan and Zhao Yunlei (CHN)

== Basketball ==
Event	Gold	Silver	Bronze
Men	United States; Jimmy Butler; Kevin Durant; DeAndre Jordan; Kyle Lowry; Harrison Barnes; DeMar DeRozan; Kyrie Irving; Klay Thompson; DeMarcus Cousins; Paul George; Draymond Green; Carmelo Anthony	Serbia; Miloš Teodosić; Marko Simonović; Bogdan Bogdanovic; Stefan Marković; Nikola Kalinic; Nemanja Nedovic; Stefan Bircevic; Miroslav Raduljica; Nikola Jokic; Vladimir Stimac; Stefan Jovic; Milan Mačvan	Spain; Pau Gasol; Rudy Fernández; Sergio Rodríguez; Juan Carlos Navarro; José Manuel Calderón; Felipe Reyes; Víctor Claver; Willy Hernangómez; Álex Abrines; Sergio Llull; Nikola Mirotić; Ricky Rubio
Women	United States; Seimone Augustus; Sue Bird; Tamika Catchings; Tina Charles; Elena Delle Donne; Sylvia Fowles; Brittney Griner; Angel McCoughtry; Maya Moore; Breanna Stewart; Diana Taurasi; Lindsay Whalen	Spain; Leticia Romero; Laura Nicholls; Silvia Domínguez; Alba Torrens; Laia Palau; Marta Xargay; Leonor Rodríguez; Lucila Pascua; Anna Cruz; Laura Quevedo; Laura Gil; Astou Ndour	Serbia; Tamara Radočaj; Sonja Petrović; Saša Čađo; Sara Krnjić; Nevena Jovanović; Jelena Milovanović; Dajana Butulija; Dragana Stanković; Aleksandra Crvendakić; Milica Dabović; Ana Dabović; Danielle Page

== Boxing ==
=== Men ===
Event	Gold	Silver	Bronze
Light flyweight	Hasanboy Dusmatov; Uzbekistan	Yuberjen Martínez; Colombia	Joahnys Argilagos; Cuba
Light flyweight	Hasanboy Dusmatov; Uzbekistan	Yuberjen Martínez; Colombia	Nico Hernández; United States
Flyweight^{[a]}	Shakhobidin Zoirov; Uzbekistan	Yoel Finol; Venezuela	Hu Jianguan; China
Flyweight^{[a]}	Shakhobidin Zoirov; Uzbekistan	Yoel Finol; Venezuela	Vacant
Bantamweight	Robeisy Ramírez; Cuba	Shakur Stevenson; United States	Vladimir Nikitin; Russia
Bantamweight	Robeisy Ramírez; Cuba	Shakur Stevenson; United States	Murodjon Akhmadaliev; Uzbekistan
Lightweight	Robson Conceição; Brazil	Sofiane Oumiha; France	Lázaro Álvarez; Cuba
Lightweight	Robson Conceição; Brazil	Sofiane Oumiha; France	Dorjnyambuugiin Otgondalai; Mongolia
Light welterweight	Fazliddin Gaibnazarov; Uzbekistan	Lorenzo Sotomayor; Azerbaijan	Vitaly Dunaytsev; Russia
Light welterweight	Fazliddin Gaibnazarov; Uzbekistan	Lorenzo Sotomayor; Azerbaijan	Artem Harutyunyan; Germany
Welterweight	Daniyar Yeleussinov; Kazakhstan	Shakhram Giyasov; Uzbekistan	Mohammed Rabii; Morocco
Welterweight	Daniyar Yeleussinov; Kazakhstan	Shakhram Giyasov; Uzbekistan	Souleymane Cissokho; France
Middleweight	Arlen López; Cuba	Bektemir Melikuziev; Uzbekistan	Misael Rodríguez; Mexico
Middleweight	Arlen López; Cuba	Bektemir Melikuziev; Uzbekistan	Kamran Shakhsuvarly; Azerbaijan
Light heavyweight	Julio César La Cruz; Cuba	Adilbek Niyazymbetov; Kazakhstan	Mathieu Bauderlique; France
Light heavyweight	Julio César La Cruz; Cuba	Adilbek Niyazymbetov; Kazakhstan	Joshua Buatsi; Great Britain
Heavyweight	Evgeny Tishchenko; Russia	Vasiliy Levit; Kazakhstan	Rustam Tulaganov; Uzbekistan
Heavyweight	Evgeny Tishchenko; Russia	Vasiliy Levit; Kazakhstan	Erislandy Savón; Cuba
Super heavyweight	Tony Yoka; France	Joe Joyce; Great Britain	Filip Hrgović; Croatia
Super heavyweight	Tony Yoka; France	Joe Joyce; Great Britain	Ivan Dychko; Kazakhstan

^{Men's flyweight} Misha Aloian of Russia originally won the silver medal, but was disqualified after he tested positive for Tuaminoheptane.

=== Women ===
Event	Gold	Silver	Bronze
Flyweight	Nicola Adams; Great Britain	Sarah Ourahmoune; France	Ren Cancan; China
Flyweight	Nicola Adams; Great Britain	Sarah Ourahmoune; France	Ingrit Valencia; Colombia
Lightweight	Estelle Mossely; France	Yin Junhua; China	Mira Potkonen; Finland
Lightweight	Estelle Mossely; France	Yin Junhua; China	Anastasia Belyakova; Russia
Middleweight	Claressa Shields; United States	Nouchka Fontijn; Netherlands	Dariga Shakimova; Kazakhstan
Middleweight	Claressa Shields; United States	Nouchka Fontijn; Netherlands	Li Qian; China

== Canoeing ==
=== Slalom ===
Event	Gold	Silver	Bronze
Men's C-1	Denis Gargaud Chanut; France	Matej Beňuš; Slovakia	Takuya Haneda; Japan
Men's C-2	Ladislav Škantár and Peter Škantár (SVK)	David Florence and Richard Hounslow (GBR)	Gauthier Klauss and Matthieu Péché (FRA)
Men's K-1	Joe Clarke; Great Britain	Peter Kauzer; Slovenia	Jiří Prskavec; Czech Republic
Women's K-1	Maialen Chourraut; Spain	Luuka Jones; New Zealand	Jessica Fox; Australia

=== Sprint ===
==== Men's ====
Games	Gold	Silver	Bronze
C-1 200 m	Yuriy Cheban (UKR)	Valentin Demyanenko (AZE)	Isaquias Queiroz (BRA)
C-1 1000 m	Sebastian Brendel (GER)	Isaquias Queiroz (BRA)	Ilia Shtokalov (RUS)
C-2 1000 m	Sebastian Brendel and Jan Vandrey (GER)	Erlon Silva and Isaquias Queiroz (BRA)	Dmytro Ianchuk and Taras Mishchuk (UKR)
K-1 200 m	Liam Heath (GBR)	Maxime Beaumont (FRA)	Saúl Craviotto (ESP) Ronald Rauhe (GER)
K-1 1000 m	Marcus Walz (ESP)	Josef Dostál (CZE)	Roman Anoshkin (RUS)
K-2 200 m	Saúl Craviotto and Cristian Toro (ESP)	Liam Heath and Jon Schofield (GBR)	Aurimas Lankas and Edvinas Ramanauskas (LTU)
K-2 1000 m	Max Rendschmidt and Marcus Gross (GER)	Marko Tomićević and Milenko Zorić (SRB)	Ken Wallace and Lachlan Tame (AUS)
K-4 1000 m	Germany; Max Rendschmidt; Tom Liebscher; Max Hoff; Marcus Gross	Slovakia; Denis Myšák; Erik Vlček; Juraj Tarr; Tibor Linka	Czech Republic; Daniel Havel; Lukáš Trefil; Josef Dostál; Jan Štěrba

==== Women's ====
Games	Gold	Silver	Bronze
K-1 200 m	Lisa Carrington; New Zealand	Marta Walczykiewicz; Poland	Inna Osypenko-Radomska; Azerbaijan
K-1 500 m	Danuta Kozák; Hungary	Emma Jørgensen; Denmark	Lisa Carrington; New Zealand
K-2 500 m	Gabriella Szabó and Danuta Kozák (HUN)	Franziska Weber and Tina Dietze (GER)	Beata Mikołajczyk and Karolina Naja (POL)
K-4 500 m	Hungary; Gabriella Szabó; Danuta Kozák; Tamara Csipes; Krisztina Fazekas	Germany; Sabrina Hering; Franziska Weber; Steffi Kriegerstein; Tina Dietze	Belarus; Marharyta Makhneva; Nadzeya Liapeshka; Volha Khudzenka; Maryna Litvinchuk

== Cycling ==
=== Road cycling ===
Games	Gold	Silver	Bronze
Men's road race	Greg Van Avermaet; Belgium	Jakob Fuglsang; Denmark	Rafał Majka; Poland
Women's road race	Anna van der Breggen; Netherlands	Emma Johansson; Sweden	Elisa Longo Borghini; Italy
Men's time trial	Fabian Cancellara; Switzerland	Tom Dumoulin; Netherlands	Chris Froome; Great Britain
Women's time trial	Kristin Armstrong; United States	Olga Zabelinskaya; Russia	Anna van der Breggen; Netherlands

=== Track cycling ===
==== Men's ====
Games	Gold	Silver	Bronze
Keirin	Jason Kenny; Great Britain	Matthijs Büchli; Netherlands	Azizulhasni Awang; Malaysia
Omnium	Elia Viviani; Italy	Mark Cavendish; Great Britain	Lasse Norman Hansen; Denmark
Team Pursuit	Great Britain WR; Ed Clancy; Steven Burke; Owain Doull; Bradley Wiggins	Australia; Alexander Edmondson; Jack Bobridge; Michael Hepburn; Sam Welsford; Callum Scotson	Denmark; Lasse Norman Hansen; Niklas Larsen; Frederik Madsen; Casper von Folsach; Rasmus Quaade
Individual Sprint	Jason Kenny; Great Britain	Callum Skinner; Great Britain	Denis Dmitriev; Russia
Team Sprint	Great Britain OR; Philip Hindes; Jason Kenny; Callum Skinner	New Zealand; Eddie Dawkins; Ethan Mitchell; Sam Webster	France; Grégory Baugé; Michaël D'Almeida; François Pervis

==== Women's ====
Games	Gold	Silver	Bronze
Keirin	Elis Ligtlee; Netherlands	Becky James; Great Britain	Anna Meares; Australia
Omnium	Laura Trott; Great Britain	Sarah Hammer; United States	Jolien D'Hoore; Belgium
Team Pursuit	Great Britain WR; Katie Archibald; Laura Trott; Elinor Barker; Joanna Rowsell	United States; Sarah Hammer; Kelly Catlin; Chloé Dygert; Jennifer Valente	Canada; Allison Beveridge; Jasmin Glaesser; Kirsti Lay; Georgia Simmerling; Laura Brown
Individual Sprint	Kristina Vogel; Germany	Becky James; Great Britain	Katy Marchant; Great Britain
Team Sprint	China; Gong Jinjie; Zhong Tianshi	Russia; Daria Shmeleva; Anastasia Voynova	Germany; Miriam Welte; Kristina Vogel

=== Mountain biking ===
Games	Gold	Silver	Bronze
Men's	Nino Schurter; Switzerland	Jaroslav Kulhavý; Czech Republic	Carlos Coloma Nicolas; Spain
Women's	Jenny Rissveds; Sweden	Maja Włoszczowska; Poland	Catharine Pendrel; Canada

=== BMX ===
Games	Gold	Silver	Bronze
Men's	Connor Fields; United States	Jelle van Gorkom; Netherlands	Carlos Ramírez; Colombia
Women's	Mariana Pajón; Colombia	Alise Post; United States	Stefany Hernández; Venezuela

== Diving ==
=== Men ===
Games	Gold	Silver	Bronze
3 m springboard	Cao Yuan; China	Jack Laugher; Great Britain	Patrick Hausding; Germany
10 m platform	Chen Aisen; China	Germán Sánchez; Mexico	David Boudia; United States
Synchronized 3 m springboard	Chris Mears and Jack Laugher (GBR)	Sam Dorman and Michael Hixon (USA)	Cao Yuan and Qin Kai (CHN)
Synchronized 10 m platform	Chen Aisen and Lin Yue (CHN)	David Boudia and Steele Johnson (USA)	Tom Daley and Daniel Goodfellow (GBR)

=== Women ===
Games	Gold	Silver	Bronze
3 m springboard	Shi Tingmao; China	He Zi; China	Tania Cagnotto; Italy
10 m platform	Ren Qian; China	Si Yajie; China	Meaghan Benfeito; Canada
Synchronized 3 m springboard	Shi Tingmao and Wu Minxia (CHN)	Tania Cagnotto and Francesca Dallapé (ITA)	Maddison Keeney and Anabelle Smith (AUS)
Synchronized 10 m platform	Chen Ruolin and Liu Huixia (CHN)	Cheong Jun Hoong and Pandelela Rinong (MAS)	Meaghan Benfeito and Roseline Filion (CAN)

== Equestrian ==
Games	Gold	Silver	Bronze
Individual dressage	Charlotte Dujardin on Valegro (GBR)	Isabell Werth on Weihegold Old (GER)	Kristina Bröring-Sprehe on Desperados FRH (GER)
Team dressage	Germany; Sönke Rothenberger on Cosmo; Dorothee Schneider on Showtime FRH; Kristina Bröring-Sprehe on Desperados FRH; Isabell Werth on Weihegold Old	Great Britain; Spencer Wilton on Super Nova II; Fiona Bigwood on Orthilia; Carl Hester on Nip Tuck; Charlotte Dujardin on Valegro	United States; Allison Brock on Rosevelt; Kasey Perry-Glass on Dublet; Steffen Peters on Legolas 92; Laura Graves on Verdades
Individual eventing	Michael Jung on Sam FBW (GER)	Astier Nicolas on Piaf de B'Neville (FRA)	Phillip Dutton on Mighty Nice (USA)
Team eventing	France; Karim Laghouag on Entebbe; Thibaut Vallette on Qing du Briot; Mathieu Lemoine on Bart L Astier Nicolas on Piaf de B'Neville	Germany; Julia Krajewski on Samourai du Thot; Sandra Auffarth on Opgun Louvo; Ingrid Klimke on Hale-Bob Old; Michael Jung on Sam FBW	Australia; Shane Rose on CP Qualified; Stuart Tinney on Pluto Mio; Sam Griffiths on Paulank Brockagh; Chris Burton on Santano II
Individual jumping	Nick Skelton on Big Star (GBR)	Peder Fredricson on All In (SWE)	Eric Lamaze on Fine Lady 5 (CAN)
Team jumping	France; Philippe Rozier on Rahotep de Toscane; Kevin Staut on Reveur de Hurtebise; Roger-Yves Bost on Sydney une Prince; Pénélope Leprevost on Flora de Mariposa	United States; Kent Farrington on Voyeur; Lucy Davis on Barron; McLain Ward on Azur; Elizabeth Madden on Cortes'C'	Germany; Christian Ahlmann on Taloubet Z Meredith Michaels-Beerbaum on Fibonacci; Daniel Deusser on First Class; Ludger Beerbaum on Casello

== Fencing ==
=== Men's ===
Event	Gold	Silver	Bronze
Individual épée	Park Sang-young; South Korea	Géza Imre; Hungary	Gauthier Grumier; France
Team épée	France; Gauthier Grumier; Yannick Borel; Daniel Jérent; Jean-Michel Lucenay	Italy; Enrico Garozzo; Marco Fichera; Paolo Pizzo; Andrea Santarelli	Hungary; Gábor Boczkó; Géza Imre; András Rédli; Péter Somfai
Individual foil	Daniele Garozzo; Italy	Alexander Massialas; United States	Timur Safin; Russia
Team foil	Russia; Timur Safin; Artur Akhmatkhuzin; Aleksey Cheremisinov	France; Jérémy Cadot; Enzo Lefort; Erwann Le Péchoux	United States; Miles Chamley-Watson; Race Imboden; Alexander Massialas; Gerek Meinhardt
Individual sabre	Áron Szilágyi; Hungary	Daryl Homer; United States	Kim Jung-hwan; South Korea

=== Women's ===
Event	Gold	Silver	Bronze
Individual épée	Emese Szász; Hungary	Rossella Fiamingo; Italy	Sun Yiwen; China
Team épée	Romania; Loredana Dinu; Simona Gherman; Simona Pop; Ana Maria Popescu	China; Hao Jialu; Sun Yiwen; Sun Yujie; Xu Anqi	Russia; Olga Kochneva; Violetta Kolobova; Tatiana Logunova; Lyubov Shutova
Individual foil	Inna Deriglazova; Russia	Elisa Di Francisca; Italy	Inès Boubakri; Tunisia
Individual sabre	Yana Egorian; Russia	Sofya Velikaya; Russia	Olha Kharlan; Ukraine
Team sabre	Russia; Sofya Velikaya; Yana Egorian; Yekaterina Dyachenko; Yuliya Gavrilova	Ukraine; Olha Kharlan; Olena Kravatska; Alina Komashchuk; Olena Voronina	United States; Monica Aksamit; Ibtihaj Muhammad; Dagmara Wozniak; Mariel Zagunis

== Field hockey ==
Event	Gold	Silver	Bronze
Men	Argentina; Juan Manuel Vivaldi; Gonzalo Peillat; Juan Ignacio Gilardi; Facundo Callioni; Lucas Rey; Matías Paredes; Joaquín Menini; Lucas Vila; Ignacio Ortiz; Juan Martín López; Juan Manuel Saladino; Matías Rey; Manuel Brunet; Agustín Mazzilli; Lucas Rossi; Pedro Ibarra	Belgium; Arthur Van Doren; John-John Dohmen; Florent Van Aubel; Sébastien Dockier; Cédric Charlier; Gauthier Boccard; Emmanuel Stockbroekx; Thomas Briels; Félix Denayer; Vincent Vanasch; Simon Gougnard; Loïck Luypaert; Tom Boon; Jérôme Truyens; Elliot Van Strydonck; Tanguy Cosyns	Germany; Nicolas Jacobi; Mathias Müller; Linus Butt; Martin Häner; Moritz Trompertz; Mats Grambusch; Christopher Wesley; Timm Herzbruch; Tobias Hauke; Tom Grambusch; Christopher Rühr; Martin Zwicker; Moritz Fürste; Florian Fuchs; Timur Oruz; Niklas Wellen
Women	Great Britain; Maddie Hinch; Laura Unsworth; Crista Cullen; Hannah Macleod; Georgie Twigg; Helen Richardson-Walsh; Susannah Townsend; Kate Richardson-Walsh; Sam Quek; Alex Danson; Giselle Ansley; Sophie Bray; Hollie Webb; Shona McCallin; Lily Owsley; Nicola White	Netherlands; Joyce Sombroek; Xan de Waard; Kitty van Male; Laurien Leurink; Willemijn Bos; Marloes Keetels; Carlien Dirkse van den Heuvel; Kelly Jonker; Maria Verschoor; Lidewij Welten; Caia van Maasakker; Maartje Paumen; Naomi van As; Ellen Hoog; Margot van Geffen; Eva de Goede	Germany; Nike Lorenz; Selin Oruz; Anne Schröder; Lisa Schütze; Charlotte Stapenhorst; Katharina Otte; Janne Müller-Wieland; Hannah Krüger; Jana Teschke; Lisa Altenburg; Franzisca Hauke; Cécile Pieper; Marie Mävers; Annika Sprink; Julia Müller; Pia-Sophie Oldhafer; Kristina Reynolds

== Football ==
Event	Gold	Silver	Bronze
Men	Brazil; Weverton; Zeca; Rodrigo Caio; Marquinhos; Renato Augusto; Douglas Santos; Luan; Rafinha; Gabriel; Neymar; Gabriel Jesus; Walace; William; Luan Garcia; Rodrigo Dourado; Thiago Maia; Felipe Anderson; Uilson	Germany; Timo Horn; Jeremy Toljan; Lukas Klostermann; Matthias Ginter; Niklas Süle; Sven Bender; Max Meyer; Lars Bender; Davie Selke; Leon Goretzka; Julian Brandt; Jannik Huth; Philipp Max; Robert Bauer; Max Christiansen; Grischa Prömel; Serge Gnabry; Nils Petersen; Eric Oelschlägel	Nigeria; Daniel Akpeyi; Muenfuh Sincere; Kingsley Madu; Shehu Abdullahi; Saturday Erimuya; William Troost-Ekong; Aminu Umar; Oghenekaro Etebo; Imoh Ezekiel; John Obi Mikel; Junior Ajayi; Popoola Saliu; Umar Sadiq; Azubuike Okechukwu; Ndifreke Udo; Stanley Amuzie; Usman Mohammed; Emmanuel Daniel
Women	Germany; Almuth Schult; Josephine Henning; Saskia Bartusiak; Leonie Maier; Annike Krahn; Simone Laudehr; Melanie Behringer; Lena Goeßling; Alexandra Popp; Dzsenifer Marozsán; Anja Mittag; Tabea Kemme; Sara Däbritz; Babett Peter; Mandy Islacker; Melanie Leupolz; Isabel Kerschowski; Laura Benkarth; Svenja Huth	Sweden; Jonna Andersson; Emilia Appelqvist; Kosovare Asllani; Emma Berglund; Stina Blackstenius; Hilda Carlén; Lisa Dahlkvist; Magdalena Ericsson; Nilla Fischer; Pauline Hammarlund; Sofia Jakobsson; Hedvig Lindahl; Fridolina Rolfö; Elin Rubensson; Jessica Samuelsson; Lotta Schelin; Caroline Seger; Linda Sembrant; Olivia Schough	Canada; Stephanie Labbé; Allysha Chapman; Kadeisha Buchanan; Shelina Zadorsky; Quinn (Note: Then known as Rebecca Quinn); Deanne Rose; Rhian Wilkinson; Diana Matheson; Josée Bélanger; Ashley Lawrence; Desiree Scott; Christine Sinclair; Sophie Schmidt; Melissa Tancredi; Nichelle Prince; Janine Beckie; Jessie Fleming; Sabrina D'Angelo

== Golf ==
Event	Gold	Silver	Bronze
Men's individual	Justin Rose; Great Britain	Henrik Stenson; Sweden	Matt Kuchar; United States
Women's individual	Inbee Park; South Korea	Lydia Ko; New Zealand	Shanshan Feng; China

== Gymnastics ==
=== Artistic ===
==== Men's events ====
Games	Gold	Silver	Bronze
Team all-around	Japan (JPN); Kenzō Shirai; Yusuke Tanaka; Koji Yamamuro; Kōhei Uchimura; Ryōhei Katō	Russia (RUS); Denis Ablyazin; David Belyavskiy; Ivan Stretovich; Nikolai Kuksenkov; Nikita Nagornyy	China (CHN); Deng Shudi; Lin Chaopan; Liu Yang; You Hao; Zhang Chenglong
Individual all-around	Kōhei Uchimura; Japan	Oleg Verniaiev; Ukraine	Max Whitlock; Great Britain
Floor exercise	Max Whitlock; Great Britain	Diego Hypólito; Brazil	Arthur Mariano; Brazil
Horizontal bar	Fabian Hambüchen; Germany	Danell Leyva; United States	Nile Wilson; Great Britain
Parallel bars	Oleg Verniaiev; Ukraine	Danell Leyva; United States	David Belyavskiy; Russia
Pommel horse	Max Whitlock; Great Britain	Louis Smith; Great Britain	Alexander Naddour; United States
Rings	Eleftherios Petrounias; Greece	Arthur Zanetti; Brazil	Denis Ablyazin; Russia
Vault	Ri Se-gwang; North Korea	Denis Ablyazin; Russia	Kenzō Shirai; Japan

==== Women's events ====
Games	Gold	Silver	Bronze
Team all-around	United States (USA); Simone Biles; Gabby Douglas; Laurie Hernandez; Madison Kocian; Aly Raisman	Russia (RUS); Angelina Melnikova; Aliya Mustafina; Maria Paseka; Daria Spiridonova; Seda Tutkhalyan	China (CHN); Fan Yilin; Mao Yi; Shang Chunsong; Tan Jiaxin; Wang Yan
Individual all-around	Simone Biles; United States	Aly Raisman; United States	Aliya Mustafina; Russia
Balance beam	Sanne Wevers; Netherlands	Laurie Hernandez; United States	Simone Biles; United States
Floor exercise	Simone Biles; United States	Aly Raisman; United States	Amy Tinkler; Great Britain
Uneven bars	Aliya Mustafina; Russia	Madison Kocian; United States	Sophie Scheder; Germany
Vault	Simone Biles; United States	Maria Paseka; Russia	Giulia Steingruber; Switzerland

=== Rhythmic ===
Games	Gold	Silver	Bronze
Individual all-around	Margarita Mamun; Russia	Yana Kudryavtseva; Russia	Ganna Rizatdinova; Ukraine
Group all-around	Russia (RUS); Vera Biryukova; Anastasia Bliznyuk; Anastasia Maksimova; Anastasiia Tatareva; Maria Tolkacheva	Spain (ESP); Sandra Aguilar; Artemi Gavezou; Elena López; Lourdes Mohedano; Alejandra Quereda	Bulgaria (BUL); Reneta Kamberova; Lyubomira Kazanova; Mihaela Maevska-Velichkova; Tsvetelina Naydenova; Hristiana Todorova

=== Trampoline ===
Games	Gold	Silver	Bronze
Men's individual	Uladzislau Hancharou; Belarus	Dong Dong; China	Gao Lei; China
Women's individual	Rosie MacLennan; Canada	Bryony Page; Great Britain	Li Dan; China

== Handball ==
Event	Gold	Silver	Bronze
Men	Denmark; Niklas Landin Jacobsen; Mads Christiansen; Mads Mensah Larsen; Casper Ulrich Mortensen; Jesper Nøddesbo; Jannick Green; Lasse Svan Hansen; René Toft Hansen; Henrik Møllgaard; Kasper Søndergaard; Henrik Toft Hansen; Mikkel Hansen; Morten Olsen; Michael Damgaard	France; Olivier Nyokas; Daniel Narcisse; Vincent Gérard; Nikola Karabatić; Kentin Mahé; Mathieu Grébille; Thierry Omeyer; Timothey N'Guessan; Luc Abalo; Cédric Sorhaindo; Michaël Guigou; Luka Karabatic; Ludovic Fabregas; Adrien Dipanda; Valentin Porte	Germany; Uwe Gensheimer; Finn Lemke; Patrick Wiencek; Tobias Reichmann; Fabian Wiede; Silvio Heinevetter; Hendrik Pekeler; Steffen Weinhold; Martin Strobel; Patrick Groetzki; Kai Häfner; Andreas Wolff; Julius Kühn; Christian Dissinger; Paul Drux
Women	Russia; Anna Sedoykina; Polina Kuznetsova; Daria Dmitrieva; Anna Sen; Olga Akopyan; Anna Vyakhireva; Marina Sudakova; Vladlena Bobrovnikova; Victoria Zhilinskayte; Yekaterina Marennikova; Irina Bliznova; Ekaterina Ilina; Maya Petrova; Tatyana Yerokhina; Victoriya Kalinina	France; Laura Glauser; Blandine Dancette; Camille Ayglon; Allison Pineau; Laurisa Landre; Grâce Zaadi; Marie Prouvensier; Amandine Leynaud; Manon Houette; Siraba Dembélé; Chloé Bulleux; Béatrice Edwige; Estelle Nze Minko; Gnonsiane Niombla; Alexandra Lacrabère	Norway; Kari Aalvik Grimsbø; Mari Molid; Emilie Hegh Arntzen; Ida Alstad; Veronica Kristiansen; Heidi Løke; Nora Mørk; Stine Bredal Oftedal; Marit Malm Frafjord; Katrine Lunde; Linn-Kristin Riegelhuth Koren; Amanda Kurtović; Camilla Herrem; Sanna Solberg

== Judo ==
=== Men's events ===
Event	Gold	Silver	Bronze
Extra-lightweight (60 kg)	Beslan Mudranov; Russia	Yeldos Smetov; Kazakhstan	Naohisa Takato; Japan
Extra-lightweight (60 kg)	Beslan Mudranov; Russia	Yeldos Smetov; Kazakhstan	Diyorbek Urozboev; Uzbekistan
Half-lightweight (66 kg)	Fabio Basile; Italy	An Ba-ul; South Korea	Rishod Sobirov; Uzbekistan
Half-lightweight (66 kg)	Fabio Basile; Italy	An Ba-ul; South Korea	Masashi Ebinuma; Japan
Lightweight (73 kg)	Shohei Ono; Japan	Rustam Orujov; Azerbaijan	Lasha Shavdatuashvili; Georgia
Lightweight (73 kg)	Shohei Ono; Japan	Rustam Orujov; Azerbaijan	Dirk Van Tichelt; Belgium
Half-middleweight (81 kg)	Khasan Khalmurzaev; Russia	Travis Stevens; United States	Sergiu Toma; United Arab Emirates
Half-middleweight (81 kg)	Khasan Khalmurzaev; Russia	Travis Stevens; United States	Takanori Nagase; Japan
Middleweight (90 kg)	Mashu Baker; Japan	Varlam Liparteliani; Georgia	Gwak Dong-han; South Korea
Middleweight (90 kg)	Mashu Baker; Japan	Varlam Liparteliani; Georgia	Cheng Xunzhao; China
Half-heavyweight (100 kg)	Lukáš Krpálek; Czech Republic	Elmar Gasimov; Azerbaijan	Cyrille Maret; France
Half-heavyweight (100 kg)	Lukáš Krpálek; Czech Republic	Elmar Gasimov; Azerbaijan	Ryunosuke Haga; Japan
Heavyweight (+100 kg)	Teddy Riner; France	Hisayoshi Harasawa; Japan	Rafael Silva; Brazil
Heavyweight (+100 kg)	Teddy Riner; France	Hisayoshi Harasawa; Japan	Or Sasson; Israel

=== Women's events ===
Event	Gold	Silver	Bronze
Extra-lightweight (48 kg)	Paula Pareto; Argentina	Jeong Bo-kyeong; South Korea	Ami Kondo; Japan
Extra-lightweight (48 kg)	Paula Pareto; Argentina	Jeong Bo-kyeong; South Korea	Galbadrakhyn Otgontsetseg; Kazakhstan
Half-lightweight (52 kg)	Majlinda Kelmendi; Kosovo	Odette Giuffrida; Italy	Misato Nakamura; Japan
Half-lightweight (52 kg)	Majlinda Kelmendi; Kosovo	Odette Giuffrida; Italy	Natalia Kuziutina; Russia
Lightweight (57 kg)	Rafaela Silva; Brazil	Dorjsürengiin Sumiyaa; Mongolia	Telma Monteiro; Portugal
Lightweight (57 kg)	Rafaela Silva; Brazil	Dorjsürengiin Sumiyaa; Mongolia	Kaori Matsumoto; Japan
Half-middleweight (63 kg)	Tina Trstenjak; Slovenia	Clarisse Agbegnenou; France	Yarden Gerbi; Israel
Half-middleweight (63 kg)	Tina Trstenjak; Slovenia	Clarisse Agbegnenou; France	Anicka van Emden; Netherlands
Middleweight (70 kg)	Haruka Tachimoto; Japan	Yuri Alvear; Colombia	Sally Conway; Great Britain
Middleweight (70 kg)	Haruka Tachimoto; Japan	Yuri Alvear; Colombia	Laura Vargas Koch; Germany
Half-heavyweight (78 kg)	Kayla Harrison; United States	Audrey Tcheuméo; France	Mayra Aguiar; Brazil
Half-heavyweight (78 kg)	Kayla Harrison; United States	Audrey Tcheuméo; France	Anamari Velenšek; Slovenia
Heavyweight (+78 kg)	Émilie Andéol; France	Idalys Ortiz; Cuba	Kanae Yamabe; Japan
Heavyweight (+78 kg)	Émilie Andéol; France	Idalys Ortiz; Cuba	Yu Song; China

== Modern pentathlon ==
Event	Gold	Silver	Bronze
Men's	Aleksander Lesun; Russia	Pavlo Tymoshchenko; Ukraine	Ismael Marcelo Hernandez Uscanga; Mexico
Women's	Chloe Esposito; Australia	Élodie Clouvel; France	Oktawia Nowacka; Poland

== Rowing ==
=== Men's events ===
Games	Gold	Silver	Bronze
Single sculls	Mahé Drysdale; New Zealand	Damir Martin; Croatia	Ondřej Synek; Czech Republic
Double sculls	Croatia; Martin Sinković; Valent Sinković	Lithuania; Mindaugas Griškonis; Saulius Ritter	Norway; Kjetil Borch; Olaf Tufte
Quadruple sculls	Germany; Philipp Wende; Lauritz Schoof; Karl Schulze; Hans Gruhne	Australia; Karsten Forsterling; Alexander Belonogoff; Cameron Girdlestone; James McRae	Estonia; Andrei Jämsä; Allar Raja; Tõnu Endrekson; Kaspar Taimsoo
Coxless pair	New Zealand; Eric Murray; Hamish Bond	South Africa; Lawrence Brittain; Shaun Keeling	Italy; Marco Di Costanzo; Giovanni Abagnale
Coxless four	Great Britain; Alex Gregory; Moe Sbihi; George Nash; Constantine Louloudis	Australia; William Lockwood; Josh Dunkley-Smith; Josh Booth; Alexander Hill	Italy; Domenico Montrone; Matteo Castaldo; Matteo Lodo; Giuseppe Vicino
Coxed eight	Great Britain; Paul Bennett; Scott Durant; Matt Gotrel; Matt Langridge; Tom Ransley; Pete Reed; Will Satch; Andrew Triggs Hodge; Phelan Hill	Germany; Maximilian Munski; Malte Jakschik; Andreas Kuffner; Eric Johannesen; Maximilian Reinelt; Felix Drahotta; Richard Schmidt; Hannes Ocik; Martin Sauer	Netherlands; Kaj Hendriks; Robert Lücken; Boaz Meylink; Boudewijn Röell; Olivier Siegelaar; Dirk Uittenbogaard; Mechiel Versluis; Tone Wieten; Peter Wiersum
Lightweight double sculls	France; Pierre Houin; Jérémie Azou	Ireland; Gary O'Donovan; Paul O'Donovan	Norway; Kristoffer Brun; Are Strandli
Lightweight coxless four	Switzerland; Lucas Tramèr; Simon Schürch; Simon Niepmann; Mario Gyr	Denmark; Jacob Barsøe; Jacob Larsen; Kasper Winther Jørgensen; Morten Jørgensen	France; Franck Solforosi; Thomas Baroukh; Guillaume Raineau; Thibault Colard

=== Women's events ===
Games	Gold	Silver	Bronze
Single sculls	Kim Brennan; Australia	Genevra Stone; United States	Duan Jingli; China
Double sculls	Poland; Magdalena Fularczyk-Kozłowska; Natalia Madaj	Great Britain; Victoria Thornley; Katherine Grainger	Lithuania; Donata Vištartaitė; Milda Valčiukaitė
Quadruple sculls	Germany; Annekatrin Thiele; Carina Bär; Julia Lier; Lisa Schmidla	Netherlands; Chantal Achterberg; Nicole Beukers; Inge Janssen; Carline Bouw	Poland; Maria Springwald; Joanna Leszczyńska; Agnieszka Kobus; Monika Ciaciuch
Coxless pair	Great Britain; Helen Glover; Heather Stanning	New Zealand; Genevieve Behrent; Rebecca Scown	Denmark; Hedvig Rasmussen; Anne Andersen
Coxed eight	United States; Emily Regan; Kerry Simmonds; Amanda Polk; Lauren Schmetterling; Tessa Gobbo; Meghan Musnicki; Elle Logan; Amanda Elmore; Katelin Snyder	Great Britain; Katie Greves; Melanie Wilson; Frances Houghton; Polly Swann; Jessica Eddie; Olivia Carnegie-Brown; Karen Bennett; Zoe Lee; Zoe de Toledo	Romania; Roxana Cogianu; Ioana Strungaru; Mihaela Petrilă; Iuliana Popa; Mădălina Beres; Laura Oprea; Adelina Boguș; Andreea Boghian; Daniela Druncea
Lightweight double sculls	Netherlands; Ilse Paulis; Maaike Head	Canada; Lindsay Jennerich; Patricia Obee	China; Huang Wenyi; Pan Feihong

== Rugby sevens ==
Event	Gold	Silver	Bronze
Men's	Fiji (FIJ); Masivesi Dakuwaqa; Apisai Domolailai; Osea Kolinisau; Semi Kunatani; Viliame Mata; Leone Nakarawa; Vatemo Ravouvou; Savenaca Rawaca; Kitione Taliga; Josua Tuisova; Jerry Tuwai; Jasa Veremalua; Samisoni Viriviri	Great Britain (GBR); Mark Bennett; Dan Bibby; Phil Burgess; Sam Cross; James Davies; Ollie Lindsay-Hague; Ruaridh McConnochie; Tom Mitchell; Dan Norton; Mark Robertson; James Rodwell; Marcus Watson	South Africa (RSA); Cecil Afrika; Tim Agaba; Kyle Brown; Juan de Jongh; Justin Geduld; François Hougaard; Werner Kok; Cheslin Kolbe; Dylan Sage; Seabelo Senatla; Kwagga Smith; Philip Snyman; Roscko Speckman
Women's	Australia (AUS); Nicole Beck; Charlotte Caslick; Emilee Cherry; Chloe Dalton; Gemma Etheridge; Ellia Green; Shannon Parry; Evania Pelite; Alicia Quirk; Emma Tonegato; Amy Turner; Sharni Williams	New Zealand (NZL); Shakira Baker; Kelly Brazier; Gayle Broughton; Theresa Fitzpatrick; Sarah Goss; Huriana Manuel; Kayla McAlister; Tyla Nathan-Wong; Terina Te Tamaki; Ruby Tui; Niall Williams; Portia Woodman	Canada (CAN); Brittany Benn; Hannah Darling; Bianca Farella; Jen Kish; Ghislaine Landry; Megan Lukan; Kayla Moleschi; Karen Paquin; Kelly Russell; Ashley Steacy; Natasha Watcham-Roy; Charity Williams

== Sailing ==
=== Women's events ===
Event	Gold	Silver	Bronze
RS:X	Charline Picon; France	Chen Peina; China	Stefania Elfutina; Russia
Laser Radial	Marit Bouwmeester; Netherlands	Annalise Murphy; Ireland	Anne-Marie Rindom; Denmark
470	Great Britain; Hannah Mills; Saskia Clark	New Zealand; Jo Aleh; Polly Powrie	France; Camille Lecointre; Hélène Defrance
49erFX	Brazil; Martine Grael; Kahena Kunze	New Zealand; Alex Maloney; Molly Meech	Denmark; Jena Mai Hansen; Katja Salskov-Iversen

=== Men's events ===
Event	Gold	Silver	Bronze
RS:X	Dorian van Rijsselberghe; Netherlands	Nick Dempsey; Great Britain	Pierre Le Coq; France
Laser	Tom Burton; Australia	Tonči Stipanović; Croatia	Sam Meech; New Zealand
Finn	Giles Scott; Great Britain	Vasilij Žbogar; Slovenia	Caleb Paine; United States
470	Croatia; Šime Fantela; Igor Marenić	Australia; Mathew Belcher; William Ryan	Greece; Panagiotis Mantis; Pavlos Kagialis
49er	New Zealand; Peter Burling; Blair Tuke	Australia; Nathan Outteridge; Iain Jensen	Germany; Erik Heil; Thomas Plößel

=== Mixed events ===
Event	Gold	Silver	Bronze
Nacra 17	Argentina; Santiago Lange; Cecilia Carranza Saroli	Australia; Jason Waterhouse; Lisa Darmanin	Austria; Thomas Zajac; Tanja Frank

== Shooting ==
=== Men's events ===
Event	Gold	Silver	Bronze
10 metre air pistol	Hoàng Xuân Vinh; Vietnam OR	Felipe Almeida Wu; Brazil	Pang Wei; China
10 metre air rifle	Niccolò Campriani; Italy OR	Serhiy Kulish; Ukraine	Vladimir Maslennikov; Russia
25 metre rapid fire pistol	Christian Reitz; Germany	Jean Quiquampoix; France	Li Yuehong; China
50 metre pistol	Jin Jong-oh; South Korea OR	Hoàng Xuân Vinh; Vietnam	Kim Song-guk; North Korea
50 metre rifle prone	Henri Junghänel; Germany OR	Kim Jong-hyun; South Korea	Kirill Grigoryan; Russia
50 metre rifle three positions	Niccolò Campriani; Italy	Sergey Kamenskiy; Russia	Alexis Raynaud; France
Skeet	Gabriele Rossetti; Italy	Marcus Svensson; Sweden	Abdullah Al-Rashidi; Independent Olympic Athletes
Trap	Josip Glasnović; Croatia	Giovanni Pellielo; Italy	Edward Ling; Great Britain
Double trap	Fehaid Al-Deehani; Independent Olympic Athletes	Marco Innocenti; Italy	Steven Scott; Great Britain

=== Women's events ===
Event	Gold	Silver	Bronze
10 metre air pistol	Zhang Mengxue; China OR	Vitalina Batsarashkina; Russia	Anna Korakaki; Greece
10 metre air rifle	Virginia Thrasher; United States OR	Du Li; China	Yi Siling; China
25 metre pistol	Anna Korakaki; Greece	Monika Karsch; Germany	Heidi Diethelm Gerber; Switzerland
50 metre rifle three positions	Barbara Engleder; Germany	Zhang Binbin; China	Du Li; China
Skeet	Diana Bacosi; Italy	Chiara Cainero; Italy	Kim Rhode; United States
Trap	Catherine Skinner; Australia	Natalie Rooney; New Zealand	Corey Cogdell; United States

== Swimming ==
=== Men's events ===
Event	Gold		Silver		Bronze	
50 m freestyle	Anthony Ervin; United States	21.40	Florent Manaudou; France	21.41	Nathan Adrian; United States	21.49
100 m freestyle	Kyle Chalmers; Australia	47.58 WJR	Pieter Timmers; Belgium	47.80 NR	Nathan Adrian; United States	47.85
200 m freestyle	Sun Yang; China	1:44.65	Chad le Clos; South Africa	1:45.20 AF	Conor Dwyer; United States	1:45.23
400 m freestyle	Mack Horton; Australia	3:41.55	Sun Yang; China	3:41.68	Gabriele Detti; Italy	3:43.69
1500 m freestyle	Gregorio Paltrinieri; Italy	14:34.57	Connor Jaeger; United States	14:39.48 NR	Gabriele Detti; Italy	14:40.86
100 m backstroke	Ryan Murphy; United States	51.97 OR	Xu Jiayu; China	52.31	David Plummer; United States	52.40
200 m backstroke	Ryan Murphy; United States	1:53.62	Mitch Larkin; Australia	1:53.96	Evgeny Rylov; Russia	1:53.97
100 m breaststroke	Adam Peaty; Great Britain	57.13 WR	Cameron van der Burgh; South Africa	58.69	Cody Miller; United States	58.87 AM
200 m breaststroke	Dmitriy Balandin; Kazakhstan	2.07.46 NR	Josh Prenot; United States	2.07.53	Anton Chupkov; Russia	2.07.70 NR
100 m butterfly	Joseph Schooling; Singapore	50.39 OR, AR	Michael Phelps; United States Chad le Clos; South Africa László Cseh; Hungary	51.14 51.14 51.14	Not awarded as there was a tie for silver.	
200 m butterfly	Michael Phelps; United States	1:53.36	Masato Sakai; Japan	1:53.40	Tamás Kenderesi; Hungary	1:53.62
200 m individual medley	Michael Phelps; United States	1:54.66	Kosuke Hagino; Japan	1:56.61	Wang Shun; China	1:57.05
400 m individual medley	Kosuke Hagino; Japan	4:06.05	Chase Kalisz; United States	4:06.75	Daiya Seto; Japan	4:09.71
4 × 100 m freestyle relay	United States; Caeleb Dressel (48.10); Michael Phelps (47.12); Ryan Held (47.73); Nathan Adrian (46.97); Jimmy Feigen^{[a]} Blake Pieroni^{[a]} Anthony Ervin^{[a]}	3:09.92	France; Mehdy Metella (48.08); Fabien Gilot (48.20); Florent Manaudou (47.14); Jérémy Stravius (47.11); Clément Mignon^{[a]} William Meynard^{[a]}	3:10.53	Australia; James Roberts (48.88); Kyle Chalmers (47.38); James Magnussen (48.11); Cameron McEvoy (47.00); Matthew Abood^{[a]}	3:11.37
4 × 200 m freestyle relay	United States; Conor Dwyer (1:45.23); Townley Haas (1:44.14); Ryan Lochte (1:46.03); Michael Phelps (1:45.26); Clark Smith^{[a]} Jack Conger^{[a]} Gunnar Bentz^{[a]}	7:00.66	Great Britain; Stephen Milne (1:46.97); Duncan Scott (1:45.05); Daniel Wallace (1:46.26); James Guy (1:44.85); Robbie Renwick^{[a]}	7:03.13 NR	Japan; Kosuke Hagino (1:45.34); Naito Ehara (1:46.11); Yuki Kobori (1:45.71); Takeshi Matsuda (1:46.34)	7:03.50
4 × 100 m medley relay	United States; Ryan Murphy (51.85) WR; Cody Miller (59.03); Michael Phelps (50.33); Nathan Adrian (46.74); David Plummer^{[a]} Kevin Cordes^{[a]} Tom Shields^{[a]} Caeleb Dressel^{[a]}	3:27.95 OR	Great Britain; Chris Walker-Hebborn (53.68); Adam Peaty (56.59); James Guy (51.35); Duncan Scott (47.62)	3:29.24 NR	Australia; Mitch Larkin (53.19); Jake Packard (58.84); David Morgan (51.18); Kyle Chalmers (46.72); Cameron McEvoy^{[a]}	3:29.93
10 km open water	Ferry Weertman; Netherlands	1:52:59.8	Spyridon Gianniotis; Greece	1:52:59.8	Marc-Antoine Olivier; France	1:53:02.0
AF African Record | AM Americas Record | SA South American Record | AS Asian Record | ER European Record | OC Oceanian Record | OR Olympic Record | WJR World Junior Record | WR World Record; NR National Record (any World Record is necessarily also an Olympic, area, and national record. Area records (for continental regions) are also national records)

^{a} Swimmers who participated in the heats only and received medals.

=== Women's events ===
Event	Gold		Silver		Bronze	
50 m freestyle	Pernille Blume; Denmark	24.07; NR	Simone Manuel; United States	24.09	Aliaksandra Herasimenia; Belarus	24.11; NR
100 m freestyle	Simone Manuel; United States; Penny Oleksiak; Canada	52.70 OR, AR; 52.70 OR, WJR, AR	Not awarded as there was a tie for gold.		Sarah Sjöström; Sweden	52.90
200 m freestyle	Katie Ledecky; United States	1:53.73	Sarah Sjöström; Sweden	1:54.08; NR	Emma McKeon; Australia	1:54.92
400 m freestyle	Katie Ledecky; United States	3:56.46; WR	Jazmin Carlin; Great Britain	4:01.23	Leah Smith; United States	4:01.92
800 m freestyle	Katie Ledecky; United States	8:04.79; WR	Jazmin Carlin; Great Britain	8:16.17	Boglárka Kapás; Hungary	8:16.37
100 m backstroke	Katinka Hosszú; Hungary	58.45	Kathleen Baker; United States	58.75	Kylie Masse; Canada Fu Yuanhui; China	58.76; NR 58.76; NR
200 m backstroke	Maya DiRado; United States	2:05.99	Katinka Hosszú; Hungary	2:06.05	Hilary Caldwell; Canada	2:07.54
100 m breaststroke	Lilly King; United States	1:04.93; OR	Yuliya Yefimova; Russia	1:05.50	Katie Meili; United States	1:05.69
200 m breaststroke	Rie Kaneto; Japan	2:20.30	Yuliya Yefimova; Russia	2:21.97	Shi Jinglin; China	2:22.28
100 m butterfly	Sarah Sjöström; Sweden	55.48; WR	Penny Oleksiak; Canada	56.46; WJR, NR	Dana Vollmer; United States	56.63
200 m butterfly	Mireia Belmonte García; Spain	2.04.85	Madeline Groves; Australia	2.04.88	Natsumi Hoshi; Japan	2.05.20
200 m individual medley	Katinka Hosszú; Hungary	2:06.58; OR	Siobhan-Marie O'Connor; Great Britain	2:06.88	Maya DiRado; United States	2:08.79
400 m individual medley	Katinka Hosszú; Hungary	4:26.36; WR	Maya DiRado; United States	4:31.15	Mireia Belmonte García; Spain	4:32.39
4 × 100 m freestyle relay	Australia; Emma McKeon (53.41); Brittany Elmslie (53.12); Bronte Campbell (52.15); Cate Campbell (51.97); Madison Wilson^{[b]}	3:30.65; WR	United States; Simone Manuel (53.36); Abbey Weitzeil (52.56); Dana Vollmer (53.18); Katie Ledecky (52.79); Amanda Weir^{[b]} Lia Neal^{[b]} Allison Schmitt^{[b]}	3:31.89 AM	Canada; Sandrine Mainville (53.86); Chantal Van Landeghem (53.12); Taylor Ruck (53.19); Penny Oleksiak (52.72); Michelle Williams^{[b]}	3:32.89 NR
4 × 200 m freestyle relay	United States; Allison Schmitt (1:56.21); Leah Smith (1:56.69); Maya DiRado (1:56.39); Katie Ledecky (1:53.74); Missy Franklin^{[b]} Melanie Margalis^{[b]} Cierra Runge^{[b]}	7:43.03	Australia; Leah Neale (1:57.95); Emma McKeon (1:54.64); Bronte Barratt (1:55.81); Tamsin Cook (1:56.47); Jessica Ashwood^{[b]}	7:44.87	Canada; Katerine Savard (1:57.91); Taylor Ruck (1:56.18); Brittany MacLean (1:56.36); Penny Oleksiak (1:54.94); Kennedy Goss^{[b]} Emily Overholt^{[b]}	7:45.39 NR
4 × 100 m medley relay	United States; Kathleen Baker (59.00); Lilly King (1:05.70); Dana Vollmer (56.00); Simone Manuel (52.43); Olivia Smoliga^{[b]} Katie Meili^{[b]} Kelsi Worrell^{[b]} Abbey Weitzeil^{[b]}	3:53.13	Australia; Emily Seebohm (58.83); Taylor McKeown (1:07.05); Emma McKeon (56.95); Cate Campbell (52.17); Madison Wilson^{[b]} Madeline Groves^{[b]} Brittany Elmslie^{[b]}	3:55.00	Denmark; Mie Nielsen (58.75); Rikke Møller Pedersen (1:06.62); Jeanette Ottesen (56.43); Pernille Blume (53.21)	3:55.01 ER
10 km open water	Sharon van Rouwendaal; Netherlands	1:56:32.1	Rachele Bruni; Italy	1:56:49.5	Poliana Okimoto; Brazil	1:56:51.4
AF African Record | AM Americas Record | SA South American Record | AS Asian Record | ER European Record | OC Oceanian Record | OR Olympic Record | WJR World Junior Record | WR World Record; NR National Record (any World Record is necessarily also an Olympic, area, and national record. Area records (for continental regions) are also national records)

^{b} Swimmers who participated in the heats only and received medals.

== Synchronized swimming ==
Event	Gold	Silver	Bronze
Duet	Russia; Natalia Ishchenko; Svetlana Romashina	China; Huang Xuechen; Sun Wenyan	Japan; Yukiko Inui; Risako Mitsui
Team	Russia; Vlada Chigireva; Natalia Ishchenko; Svetlana Kolesnichenko; Aleksandra Patskevich; Svetlana Romashina; Alla Shishkina; Maria Shurochkina; Gelena Topilina; Elena Prokofyeva	China; Gu Xiao; Guo Li; Li Xiaolu; Liang Xinping; Sun Wenyan; Tang Mengni; Yin Chengxin; Zeng Zhen; Huang Xuechen	Japan; Aika Hakoyama; Yukiko Inui; Kei Marumo; Risako Mitsui; Kanami Nakamaki; Mai Nakamura; Kano Omata; Kurumi Yoshida; Aiko Hayashi

== Table tennis ==
Event	Gold	Silver	Bronze
Men's singles	Ma Long; China	Zhang Jike; China	Jun Mizutani; Japan
Men's team	China; Zhang Jike; Ma Long; Xu Xin	Japan; Koki Niwa; Jun Mizutani; Maharu Yoshimura	Germany; Timo Boll; Dimitrij Ovtcharov; Bastian Steger
Women's singles	Ding Ning; China	Li Xiaoxia; China	Kim Song-i; North Korea
Women's team	China; Liu Shiwen; Ding Ning; Li Xiaoxia	Germany; Han Ying; Petrissa Solja; Shan Xiaona	Japan; Ai Fukuhara; Kasumi Ishikawa; Mima Ito

== Taekwondo ==
=== Men's events ===
Event	Gold	Silver	Bronze
Flyweight (58 kg)	Zhao Shuai; China	Tawin Hanprab; Thailand	Luisito Pie; Dominican Republic
Flyweight (58 kg)	Zhao Shuai; China	Tawin Hanprab; Thailand	Kim Tae-hun; South Korea
Featherweight (68 kg)	Ahmad Abughaush; Jordan	Alexey Denisenko; Russia	Lee Dae-hoon; South Korea
Featherweight (68 kg)	Ahmad Abughaush; Jordan	Alexey Denisenko; Russia	Joel González; Spain
Welterweight (80 kg)	Cheick Sallah Cisse; Ivory Coast	Lutalo Muhammad; Great Britain	Milad Beigi; Azerbaijan
Welterweight (80 kg)	Cheick Sallah Cisse; Ivory Coast	Lutalo Muhammad; Great Britain	Oussama Oueslati; Tunisia
Heavyweight (+80 kg)	Radik Isayev; Azerbaijan	Abdoul Issoufou; Niger	Maicon Siqueira; Brazil
Heavyweight (+80 kg)	Radik Isayev; Azerbaijan	Abdoul Issoufou; Niger	Cha Dong-min; South Korea

=== Women's events ===
Event	Gold	Silver	Bronze
Flyweight (49 kg)	Kim So-hui; South Korea	Tijana Bogdanović; Serbia	Patimat Abakarova; Azerbaijan
Flyweight (49 kg)	Kim So-hui; South Korea	Tijana Bogdanović; Serbia	Panipak Wongpattanakit; Thailand
Featherweight (57 kg)	Jade Jones; Great Britain	Eva Calvo; Spain	Hedaya Malak; Egypt
Featherweight (57 kg)	Jade Jones; Great Britain	Eva Calvo; Spain	Kimia Alizadeh; Iran
Welterweight (67 kg)	Oh Hye-ri; South Korea	Haby Niaré; France	Ruth Gbagbi; Ivory Coast
Welterweight (67 kg)	Oh Hye-ri; South Korea	Haby Niaré; France	Nur Tatar; Turkey
Heavyweight (+67 kg)	Zheng Shuyin; China	María Espinoza; Mexico	Bianca Walkden; Great Britain
Heavyweight (+67 kg)	Zheng Shuyin; China	María Espinoza; Mexico	Jackie Galloway; United States

== Tennis ==
Event	Gold	Silver	Bronze
Men's Singles	Andy Murray; Great Britain	Juan Martín del Potro; Argentina	Kei Nishikori; Japan
Men's Doubles	Spain; Marc López; Rafael Nadal	Romania; Florin Mergea; Horia Tecău	United States; Steve Johnson; Jack Sock
Women's Singles	Monica Puig; Puerto Rico	Angelique Kerber; Germany	Petra Kvitová; Czech Republic
Women's Doubles	Russia; Ekaterina Makarova; Elena Vesnina	Switzerland; Timea Bacsinszky; Martina Hingis	Czech Republic; Lucie Šafářová; Barbora Strýcová
Mixed Doubles	United States; Bethanie Mattek-Sands; Jack Sock	United States; Venus Williams; Rajeev Ram	Czech Republic; Lucie Hradecká; Radek Štěpánek

== Triathlon ==
Event	Gold	Silver	Bronze
Men's individual	Alistair Brownlee; Great Britain	Jonathan Brownlee; Great Britain	Henri Schoeman; South Africa
Women's individual	Gwen Jorgensen; United States	Nicola Spirig Hug; Switzerland	Vicky Holland; Great Britain

== Volleyball ==
=== Indoor volleyball ===
Event	Gold	Silver	Bronze
Men's indoor	Brazil; William Arjona; Éder Carbonera; Wallace de Souza; Luiz Felipe Fonteles; Evandro Guerra; Ricardo Lucarelli Souza; Bruno Rezende; Lucas Saatkamp; Sérgio Santos; Maurício Silva; Douglas Souza; Maurício Souza	Italy; Oleg Antonov; Emanuele Birarelli; Simone Buti; Massimo Colaci; Simone Giannelli; Osmany Juantorena; Filippo Lanza; Matteo Piano; Salvatore Rossini; Pasquale Sottile; Luca Vettori; Ivan Zaytsev	United States; Matthew Anderson; Micah Christenson; Maxwell Holt; Thomas Jaeschke; David Lee; William Priddy; Aaron Russell; Taylor Sander; Erik Shoji; Kawika Shoji; David Smith; Murphy Troy
Women's indoor	China; Ding Xia; Gong Xiangyu; Hui Ruoqi; Lin Li; Liu Xiaotong; Wei Qiuyue; Xu Yunli; Yan Ni; Yang Fangxu; Yuan Xinyue; Zhang Changning; Zhu Ting	Serbia; Tijana Bošković; Jovana Brakočević; Bianka Buša; Tijana Malešević; Brankica Mihajlović; Jelena Nikolić; Maja Ognjenović; Silvija Popović; Milena Rašić; Jovana Stevanović; Stefana Veljković; Bojana Živković	United States; Rachael Adams; Foluke Akinradewo; Kayla Banwarth; Alisha Glass; Christa Harmotto; Kimberly Hill; Jordan Larson; Carli Lloyd; Karsta Lowe; Kelly Murphy; Kelsey Robinson; Courtney Thompson

=== Beach volleyball ===
Event	Gold	Silver	Bronze
Men's beach	Brazil; Alison Cerutti; Bruno Oscar Schmidt	Italy; Daniele Lupo; Paolo Nicolai	Netherlands; Alexander Brouwer; Robert Meeuwsen
Women's beach	Germany; Laura Ludwig; Kira Walkenhorst	Brazil; Ágatha Bednarczuk; Bárbara Seixas	United States; Kerri Walsh Jennings; April Ross

== Water polo ==
Event	Gold	Silver	Bronze
Men	Serbia; Gojko Pijetlović; Dušan Mandić; Živko Gocić; Sava Ranđelović; Miloš Ćuk; Duško Pijetlović; Slobodan Nikić; Milan Aleksić; Nikola Jakšić; Filip Filipović; Andrija Prlainović; Stefan Mitrović; Branislav Mitrović	Croatia; Josip Pavić; Damir Burić; Antonio Petković; Luka Lončar; Maro Joković; Luka Bukić; Xavier García; Andro Bušlje; Sandro Sukno; Ivan Krapić; Anđelo Šetka; Marko Macan; Marko Bijač	Italy; Stefano Tempesti; Francesco Di Fulvio; Niccolò Gitto; Pietro Figlioli; Alessandro Velotto; Michael Bodegas; Andrea Fondelli; Valentino Gallo; Christian Presciutti; Nicholas Presciutti; Matteo Aicardi; Alessandro Nora; Marco Del Lungo
Women	United States; Samantha Hill; Madeline Musselmann; Melissa Seidemann; Rachel Fattal; Aria Fischer; Maggie Steffens; Courtney Mathewson; Kiley Neushul; Caroline Clark; Kaleigh Gilchrist; Makenzie Fischer; Kami Craig; Ashleigh Johnson	Italy; Giulia Gorlero; Chiara Tabani; Arianna Garibotti; Elisa Queirolo; Federica Radicchi; Rosaria Aiello; Tania Di Mario; Roberta Bianconi; Giulia Enrica Emmolo; Francesca Pomeri; Aleksandra Cotti; Teresa Frassinetti; Laura Teani	Russia; Anna Ustyukhina; Maria Borisova; Ekaterina Prokofyeva; Elvina Karimova; Nadezhda Fedotova; Olga Belova; Ekaterina Lisunova; Anastasia Simanovich; Anna Timofeeva; Evgenia Soboleva; Evgeniya Ivanova; Anna Grineva; Anna Karnaukh

== Weightlifting ==
=== Men's events ===
Event	Gold	Silver	Bronze
56 kg	Long Qingquan; China	Om Yun-Chol; North Korea	Sinphet Kruaithong; Thailand
62 kg	Óscar Figueroa; Colombia	Eko Yuli Irawan; Indonesia	Farkhad Kharki; Kazakhstan
69 kg	Shi Zhiyong; China	Daniyar Ismayilov; Turkey	Luis Javier Mosquera; Colombia
77 kg	Lü Xiaojun; China	Mohamed Mahmoud; Egypt	Chatuphum Chinnawong; Thailand
85 kg	Kianoush Rostami; Iran WR	Tian Tao; China	Denis Ulanov; Kazakhstan
94 kg	Sohrab Moradi; Iran	Vadzim Straltsou; Belarus	Aurimas Didžbalis; Lithuania
105 kg	Ruslan Nurudinov; Uzbekistan	Simon Martirosyan; Armenia	Aleksandr Zaychikov; Kazakhstan
+105 kg	Lasha Talakhadze; Georgia WR OR	Gor Minasyan; Armenia	Irakli Turmanidze; Georgia

=== Women's events ===
Event	Gold	Silver	Bronze
48 kg	Sopita Tanasan; Thailand	Sri Wahyuni Agustiani; Indonesia	Hiromi Miyake; Japan
53 kg	Hsu Shu-ching; Chinese Taipei	Hidilyn Diaz; Philippines	Yoon Jin-hee; South Korea
58 kg	Sukanya Srisurat; Thailand	Pimsiri Sirikaew; Thailand	Kuo Hsing-chun; Chinese Taipei
63 kg	Deng Wei; China WR, OR	Choe Hyo-sim; North Korea	Karina Goricheva; Kazakhstan
69 kg	Xiang Yanmei; China	Zhazira Zhapparkul; Kazakhstan	Sara Ahmed; Egypt
75 kg	Rim Jong-sim; North Korea	Darya Naumava; Belarus	Lydia Valentín; Spain
+75 kg	Meng Suping; China	Kim Kuk-hyang; North Korea	Sarah Robles; United States

== Wrestling ==
=== Men's Greco-Roman ===
Event	Gold	Silver	Bronze
59 kg	Ismael Borrero; Cuba	Shinobu Ota; Japan	Elmurat Tasmuradov; Uzbekistan
59 kg	Ismael Borrero; Cuba	Shinobu Ota; Japan	Stig André Berge; Norway
66 kg	Davor Štefanek; Serbia	Migran Arutyunyan; Armenia	Shmagi Bolkvadze; Georgia
66 kg	Davor Štefanek; Serbia	Migran Arutyunyan; Armenia	Rasul Chunayev; Azerbaijan
75 kg	Roman Vlasov; Russia	Mark Madsen; Denmark	Kim Hyeon-woo; South Korea
75 kg	Roman Vlasov; Russia	Mark Madsen; Denmark	Saeid Abdevali; Iran
85 kg	Davit Chakvetadze; Russia	Zhan Beleniuk; Ukraine	Javid Hamzatau; Belarus
85 kg	Davit Chakvetadze; Russia	Zhan Beleniuk; Ukraine	Denis Kudla; Germany
98 kg	Artur Aleksanyan; Armenia	Yasmany Lugo; Cuba	Cenk İldem; Turkey
98 kg	Artur Aleksanyan; Armenia	Yasmany Lugo; Cuba	Ghasem Rezaei; Iran
130 kg	Mijaín López; Cuba	Rıza Kayaalp; Turkey	Sabah Shariati; Azerbaijan
130 kg	Mijaín López; Cuba	Rıza Kayaalp; Turkey	Sergey Semenov; Russia

=== Men's freestyle ===
Event	Gold	Silver	Bronze
57 kg	Vladimer Khinchegashvili; Georgia	Rei Higuchi; Japan	Haji Aliyev; Azerbaijan
57 kg	Vladimer Khinchegashvili; Georgia	Rei Higuchi; Japan	Hassan Rahimi; Iran
65 kg	Soslan Ramonov; Russia	Toghrul Asgarov; Azerbaijan	Frank Chamizo; Italy
65 kg	Soslan Ramonov; Russia	Toghrul Asgarov; Azerbaijan	Ikhtiyor Navruzov; Uzbekistan
74 kg	Hassan Yazdani; Iran	Aniuar Geduev; Russia	Jabrayil Hasanov; Azerbaijan
74 kg	Hassan Yazdani; Iran	Aniuar Geduev; Russia	Soner Demirtaş; Turkey
86 kg	Abdulrashid Sadulaev; Russia	Selim Yaşar; Turkey	Sharif Sharifov; Azerbaijan
86 kg	Abdulrashid Sadulaev; Russia	Selim Yaşar; Turkey	J'den Cox; United States
97 kg	Kyle Snyder; United States	Khetag Gazyumov; Azerbaijan	Albert Saritov; Romania
97 kg	Kyle Snyder; United States	Khetag Gazyumov; Azerbaijan	Magomed Ibragimov; Uzbekistan
125 kg	Taha Akgül; Turkey	Komeil Ghasemi; Iran	Ibrahim Saidau; Belarus
125 kg	Taha Akgül; Turkey	Komeil Ghasemi; Iran	Geno Petriashvili; Georgia

=== Women's freestyle ===
Event	Gold	Silver	Bronze
48 kg	Eri Tosaka; Japan	Mariya Stadnik; Azerbaijan	Sun Yanan; China
48 kg	Eri Tosaka; Japan	Mariya Stadnik; Azerbaijan	Elitsa Yankova; Bulgaria
53 kg	Helen Maroulis; United States	Saori Yoshida; Japan	Nataliya Synyshyn; Azerbaijan
53 kg	Helen Maroulis; United States	Saori Yoshida; Japan	Sofia Mattsson; Sweden
58 kg	Kaori Icho; Japan	Valeria Koblova; Russia	Marwa Amri; Tunisia
58 kg	Kaori Icho; Japan	Valeria Koblova; Russia	Sakshi Malik; India
63 kg	Risako Kawai; Japan	Maryia Mamashuk; Belarus	Yekaterina Larionova; Kazakhstan
63 kg	Risako Kawai; Japan	Maryia Mamashuk; Belarus	Monika Michalik; Poland
69 kg	Sara Dosho; Japan	Nataliya Vorobyova; Russia	Elmira Syzdykova; Kazakhstan
69 kg	Sara Dosho; Japan	Nataliya Vorobyova; Russia	Jenny Fransson; Sweden
75 kg	Erica Wiebe; Canada	Guzel Manyurova; Kazakhstan	Zhang Fengliu; China
75 kg	Erica Wiebe; Canada	Guzel Manyurova; Kazakhstan	Ekaterina Bukina; Russia

== Changes in medals ==
On 18 August 2016, Kyrgyz weightlifter Izzat Artykov was stripped of his bronze medal in the men's 69 kg event after testing positive for strychnine. Luis Javier Mosquera of Colombia, who had been the fourth-place finisher before Artykov's disqualification, was moved into third place.

On 8 December 2016, the CAS disqualified weightlifter Gabriel Sîncrăian of Romania and boxer Misha Aloian of Russia after he tested positive for tuaminoheptane.

== See also ==
- 2016 Summer Olympics medal table
