= Jamaica at the 2016 Summer Olympics =

- IOC code: JAM
- NOC: Jamaica Olympic Association
- Website: www.joa.org.jm

in Rio de Janeiro
- Competitors: 56 in 4 sports
- Flag bearers: Shelly-Ann Fraser-Pryce (opening); Javon Francis (closing)
- Medals Ranked 16th: Gold 6 Silver 3 Bronze 2 Total 11

Summer Olympics appearances (overview)
- 1948; 1952; 1956; 1960; 1964; 1968; 1972; 1976; 1980; 1984; 1988; 1992; 1996; 2000; 2004; 2008; 2012; 2016; 2020; 2024

Other related appearances
- British West Indies (1960 S)

Jamaica competed at the 2016 Summer Olympics in Rio de Janeiro, from August 5 to 21, 2016. This marked its sixteenth Summer Olympic appearance as an independent nation, although it had previously competed in four other editions as a British colony, and as part of the West Indies Federation.

Jamaica Olympic Association sent its largest ever delegation to the Games, with 56 athletes, 25 men and 31 women, competing only in track and field, swimming, diving, and artistic gymnastics, which marked the country's Olympic debut in Rio de Janeiro.

Heading the list of athletes on the Jamaican roster were sprint superstars Usain Bolt, who was looking to successfully defend his 100 m, 200 m, and 4 × 100 m relay titles (referred to as "treble treble"), and Shelly-Ann Fraser-Pryce, who was hunting for her third consecutive title in the women's 100 metres, and eventually acted as the nation's flag bearer in the opening ceremony. Apart from Bolt and Fraser-Pryce, several Jamaican athletes had past Olympic experience, including former champion Veronica Campbell-Brown in the women's 200 metres, Bolt's sprint teammates Asafa Powell and Yohan Blake, and four-time Olympians Novlene Williams-Mills (women's 400 metres) and swimmer Alia Atkinson.

Jamaica left Rio de Janeiro with a total of 11 medals (6 gold, 3 silver, and 2 bronze), matching its overall tally from the 2008 Summer Olympics in Beijing; all of these medals were awarded to the track and field athletes. In his fourth and final Olympics, Bolt successfully completed a set of three consecutive titles across the 100 m, 200 m, and 4 × 100 m relay races, making him one of the most decorated Olympians of all-time in the track and field. Moreover, he joined Carl Lewis and Paavo Nurmi as the only athletes to establish a record of nine gold medals in the sport. Fraser-Pryce witnessed her three-peat bid come to an end, as her compatriot Elaine Thompson beat out the defending champion to run away with a gold in the women's 100 m. Other medalists also included Omar McLeod, who became the first Jamaican to successfully earn the men's 110 m hurdles title, and Williams-Mills, who anchored the Jamaican squad for a runner-up finish in the women's 4 × 400 m relay, adding a silver to her career tally of three bronze medals that she previously collected in three consecutive Olympics.

== Medalists ==
Medal	Name	Sport	Event	Date
Gold	Elaine Thompson	Athletics	Women's 100 m	August 13
Gold	Usain Bolt	Athletics	Men's 100 m	August 14
Gold	Omar McLeod	Athletics	Men's 110 m hurdles	August 16
Gold	Elaine Thompson	Athletics	Women's 200 m	August 17
Gold	Usain Bolt	Athletics	Men's 200 m	August 18
Gold	Asafa Powell; Yohan Blake; Nickel Ashmeade; Usain Bolt; Kemar Bailey-Cole*; Jevaughn Minzie*	Athletics	Men's 4 × 100 m relay	August 19
Silver	Christania Williams; Elaine Thompson; Veronica Campbell-Brown; Shelly-Ann Fraser-Pryce; Simone Facey*; Shashalee Forbes*	Athletics	Women's 4 × 100 m relay	August 19
Silver	Stephenie Ann McPherson; Anneisha McLaughlin-Whilby; Shericka Jackson; Novlene Williams-Mills; Christine Day*; Chrisann Gordon*	Athletics	Women's 4 × 400 m relay	August 20
Silver	Nathon Allen; Fitzroy Dunkley; Javon Francis; Peter Matthews; Rusheen McDonald*	Athletics	4 × 400 m relay	August 20
Bronze	Shelly-Ann Fraser-Pryce	Athletics	Women's 100 m	August 13
Bronze	Shericka Jackson	Athletics	Women's 400 m	August 15

== Athletics (track and field) ==
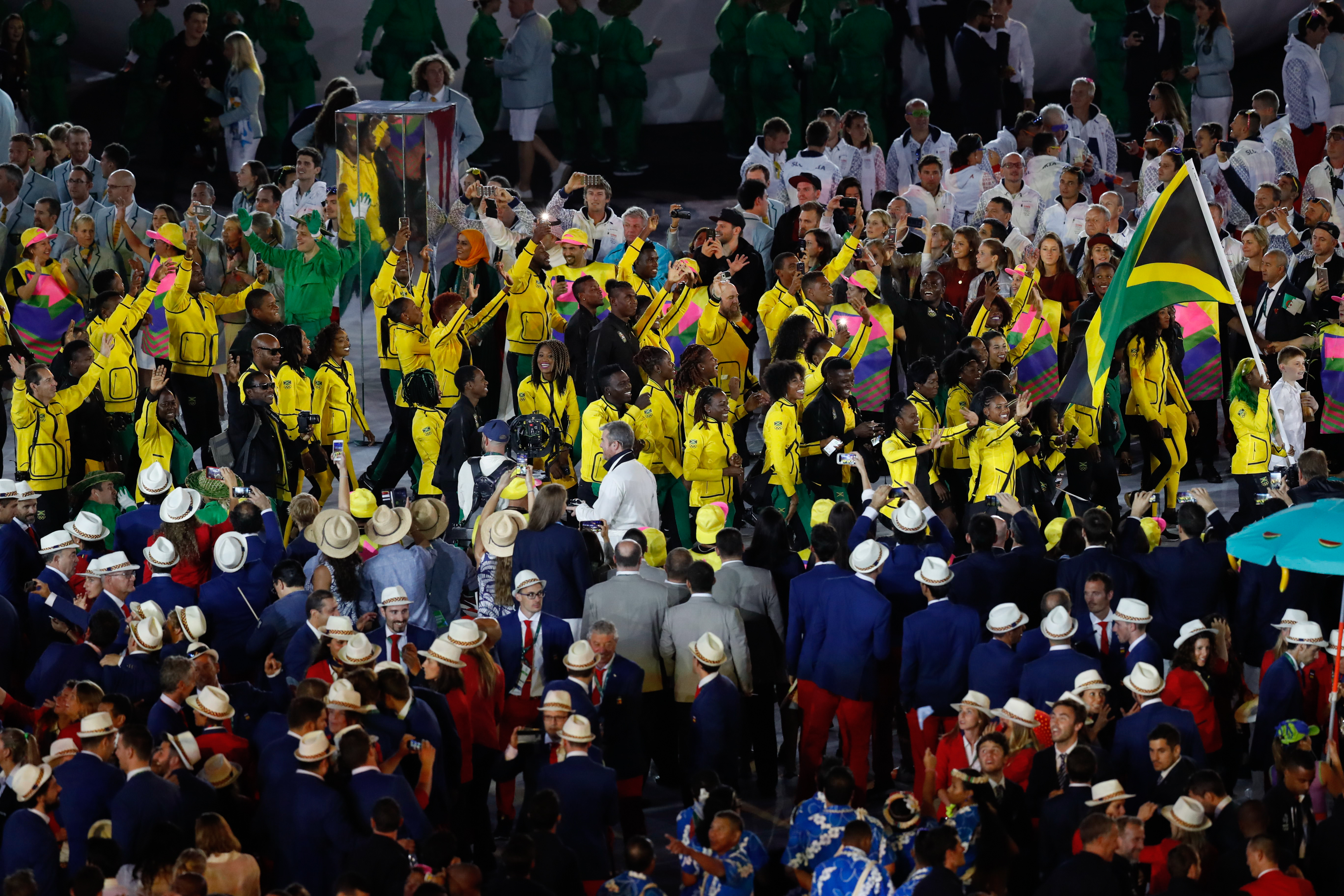
Shelly-Ann Fraser-Pryce carrying the flag on behalf of athletes from Jamaica during the parade of nation within the opening ceremony

Jamaican athletes have so far achieved qualifying standards in the following athletics events (up to a maximum of 3 athletes in each event):

The full Jamaican track and field team was announced on July 11, 2016, including sprinting superstars and defending Olympic champions Usain Bolt (men's 100, 200, and 4 × 100 m relay) and Shelly-Ann Fraser-Pryce (women's 100 m). When the team was named in many events, four athletes were named "including alternates." The ambiguity of the team composition is to accommodate Usain Bolt, perhaps the biggest celebrity in the sport of athletics. Bolt suffered a grade one hamstring tear during the Jamaican Olympic Trials and pulled out of the final 100 metres race. After filing for a medical exemption, Bolt was added to the Olympic team, pending his proof of fitness at a meet later in July. Bolt ran a sub-20 second 200 metres at that meet, the London Grand Prix, so it is presumed he established his fitness and will defend his titles. Also on the list of entrants were London 2012 bronze medalist Hansle Parchment (men's 110 m hurdles), Janieve Russell (women's 400mh) and Elaine Thompson (women's 200 m), even though they did not compete at the trials. Keeping the pattern, several other fourth-place finishers were added to the list.

Key

- Note–Ranks given for track events are within the athlete's heat only
- Q = Qualified for the next round
- q = Qualified for the next round as a fastest loser or, in field events, by position without achieving the qualifying target
- NR = National record
- N/A = Round not applicable for the event
- Bye = Athlete not required to compete in round

Track & road events
Men

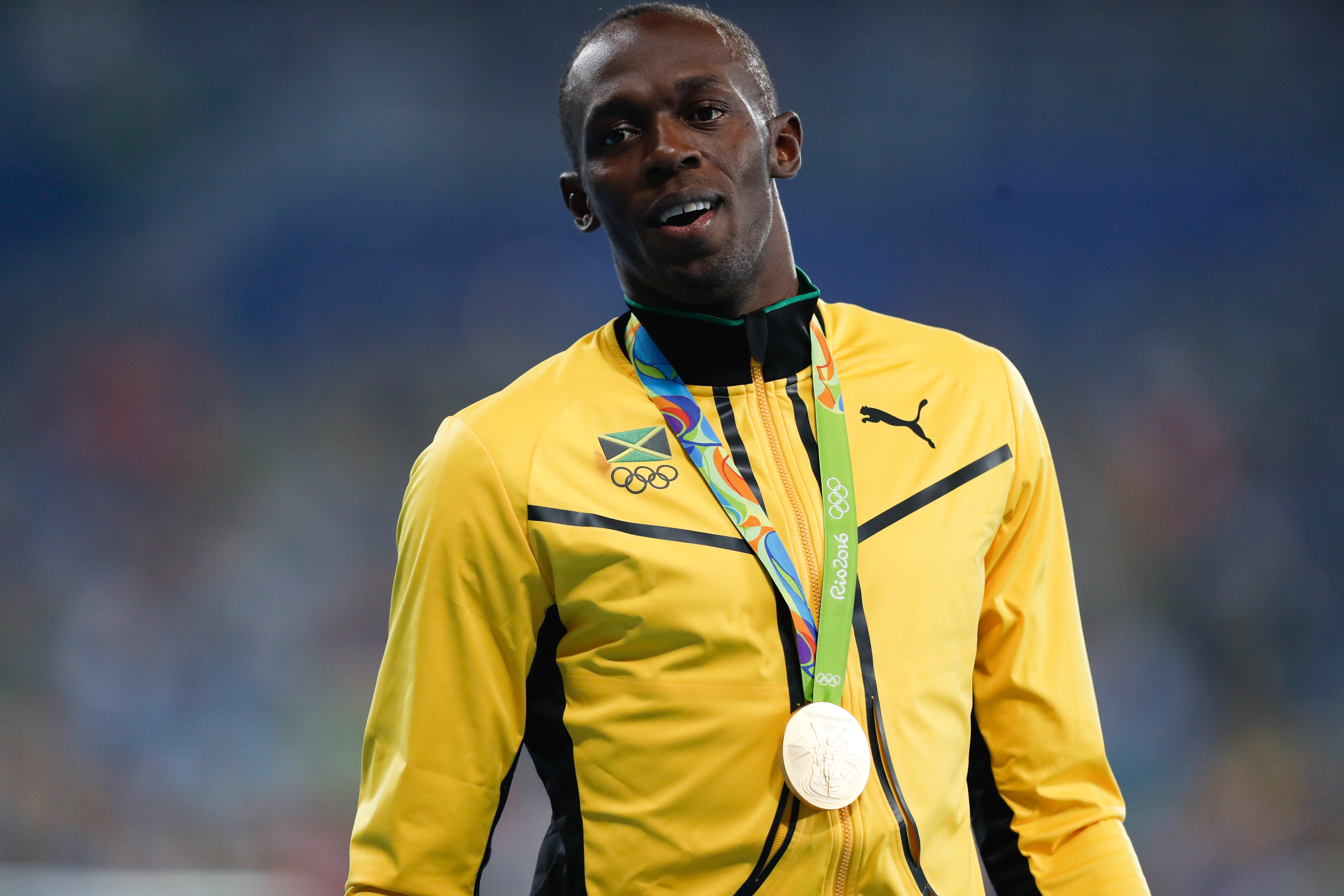
Usain Bolt successfully defend three gold medals

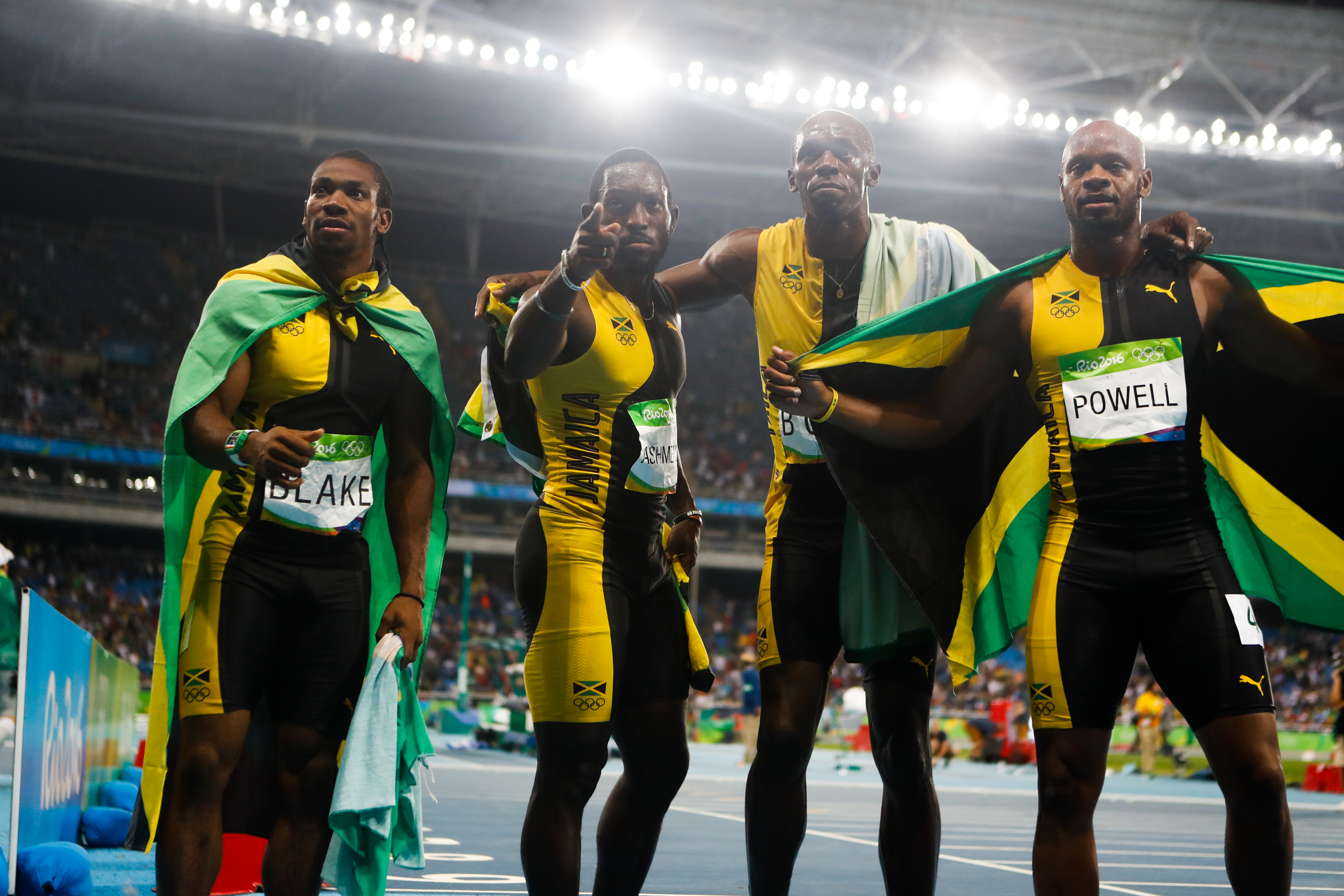
Jamaica wins the men's 4x100 relay

Athlete	Event	Heat		Quarterfinal		Semifinal		Final	
Athlete	Event	Result	Rank	Result	Rank	Result	Rank	Result	Rank
Nickel Ashmeade	100 m	Bye		10.13	2 Q	10.05	5	Did not advance	
Yohan Blake	100 m	Bye		10.11	1 Q	10.01	2 Q	9.93	4
Usain Bolt	100 m	Bye		10.07	1 Q	9.86	1 Q	9.81	1st place, gold medalist(s)
Nickel Ashmeade	200 m	20.15	1 Q	—		20.31	13	Did not advance	
Yohan Blake	200 m	20.13	2 Q	—		20.37	16	Did not advance	
Usain Bolt	200 m	20.28	1 Q	—		19.78	1 Q	19.78	1st place, gold medalist(s)
Fitzroy Dunkley	400 m	45.66	4	—		Did not advance			
Javon Francis	400 m	45.88	3 Q	—		44.96	5	Did not advance	
Rusheen McDonald	400 m	45.22	2 Q	—		46.12	6	Did not advance	
Kemoy Campbell	5000 m	13:30.32	10	—				Did not advance	
Deuce Carter	110 m hurdles	13.51	1 q	—		13.69	6	Did not advance	
Omar McLeod	110 m hurdles	13.27	1 Q	—		13.15	1 Q	13.05	1st place, gold medalist(s)
Andrew Riley	110 m hurdles	13.52	3 Q	—		13.46	4	Did not advance	
Roxroy Cato	400 m hurdles	48.56	4 q	—		DSQ		Did not advance	
Jaheel Hyde	400 m hurdles	49.24	4 q	—		49.17	5	Did not advance	
Annsert Whyte	400 m hurdles	48.37	1 Q	—		48.32	1 Q	48.07	5
Nickel Ashmeade; Yohan Blake; Usain Bolt; Jevaughn Minzie; Asafa Powell; Kemar Bailey-Cole	4 × 100 m relay	37.94	2 Q	—				37.27	1st place, gold medalist(s)
Nathon Allen; Fitzroy Dunkley; Javon Francis; Peter Matthews; Rusheen McDonald	4 × 400 m relay	2:58.29	1 Q	—				2:58.16	2nd place, silver medalist(s)

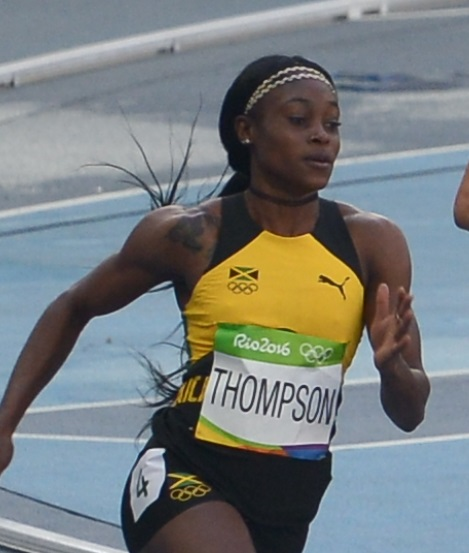
Elaine Thompson became a double Olympic champion with gold medals in the 100 m and 200 m

Women

Athlete	Event	Heat		Quarterfinal		Semifinal		Final	
Athlete	Event	Result	Rank	Result	Rank	Result	Rank	Result	Rank
Shelly-Ann Fraser-Pryce	100 m	Bye		10.96	1 Q	10.88	1 Q	10.86	3rd place, bronze medalist(s)
Elaine Thompson	100 m	Bye		11.21	1 Q	10.88	1 Q	10.71	1st place, gold medalist(s)
Christania Williams	100 m	Bye		11.27	2 Q	10.96	3 Q	11.80	8
Veronica Campbell-Brown	200 m	22.97	3	—		Did not advance			
Simone Facey	200 m	22.78	2 Q	—		22.57 SB	3	Did not advance	
Elaine Thompson	200 m	22.63	2 Q	—		22.13 SB	2 Q	21.78 SB	1st place, gold medalist(s)
Christine Day	400 m	51.54	1 Q	—		51.53	4	Did not advance	
Shericka Jackson	400 m	51.73	1 Q	—		49.83	1 Q	49.85	3rd place, bronze medalist(s)
Stephenie Ann McPherson	400 m	51.36	1 Q	—		50.69	1 Q	50.97	6
Simoya Campbell	800 m	2:02.07	7	—		Did not advance			
Natoya Goule	800 m	2:00.49	3	—		Did not advance			
Kenia Sinclair	800 m	2:03.76	7	—		Did not advance			
Megan Simmonds	100 m hurdles	12.81	2 Q	—		12.95	5	Did not advance	
Shermaine Williams	100 m hurdles	12.95	4 q	—		12.86 SB	5	Did not advance	
Nickiesha Wilson	100 m hurdles	12.89	3 Q	—		13.14	7	Did not advance	
Leah Nugent	400 m hurdles	55.66	2 Q	—		54.98	4 q	54.45	6
Janieve Russell	400 m hurdles	56.13	2 Q	—		54.92	2 Q	54.56	7
Ristananna Tracey	400 m hurdles	54.88	1 Q	—		54.80	2 Q	54.15	5
Aisha Praught	3000 m steeplechase	9:35.79	8 q	—				9:34.20	14
Veronica Campbell-Brown; Simone Facey; Sashalee Forbes; Shelly-Ann Fraser-Pryce; Elaine Thompson; Christania Williams	4 × 100 m relay	41.79	1 Q	—				41.36	2nd place, silver medalist(s)
Christine Day; Chrisann Gordon; Shericka Jackson; Anneisha McLaughlin-Whilby; Stephenie Ann McPherson; Novlene Williams-Mills	4 × 400 m relay	3:22.38	1 Q	—				3:20.34	2nd place, silver medalist(s)

Field events
Men

Athlete	Event	Qualification		Final	
Athlete	Event	Distance	Position	Distance	Position
Damar Forbes	Long jump	7.85	12 q	7.82	12
Aubrey Smith	Long jump	NM	—	Did not advance	
Clive Pullen	Triple jump	16.08	33	Did not advance	
O'Dayne Richards	Shot put	20.40	12 q	20.64	8
Fedrick Dacres	Discus throw	50.69	34	Did not advance	

Women

Athlete	Event	Qualification		Final	
Athlete	Event	Distance	Position	Distance	Position
Shanieka Thomas	Triple jump	14.02	14	Did not advance	
Kimberly Williams	Triple jump	14.22	6 q	14.53	7
Danniel Thomas	Shot put	16.99	25	Did not advance	
Tara-Sue Barnett	Discus throw	58.09	16	Did not advance	
Kellion Knibb	Discus throw	NM	—	Did not advance	
Shadae Lawrence	Discus throw	57.09	22	Did not advance	
Daina Levy	Hammer throw	60.35	30	Did not advance	

== Diving ==
For the first time since the 1972 Summer Olympics, Jamaica has entered one diver into the Olympic competition by virtue of a top 18 finish at the 2016 FINA World Cup.

Athlete	Event	Preliminaries		Semifinals		Final	
Athlete	Event	Points	Rank	Points	Rank	Points	Rank
Yona Knight-Wisdom	Men's 3 m springboard	416.55	11 Q	381.40	14	Did not advance	

== Gymnastics ==
=== Artistic ===
Jamaica has entered one artistic gymnast for the first time into the Olympic competition. Toni-Ann Williams had claimed her Olympic spot in the women's apparatus and all-around events at the Olympic Test Event in Rio de Janeiro.

Women

Athlete	Event	Qualification						Final					
Athlete	Event	Apparatus				Total	Rank	Apparatus				Total	Rank
Athlete	Event	V	UB	BB	F	Total	Rank	V	UB	BB	F	Total	Rank
Toni-Ann Williams	All-around	14.100	11.533	12.133	13.200	50.966	54	Did not advance					

== Swimming ==
Jamaican swimmers have so far achieved qualifying standards in the following events (up to a maximum of 2 swimmers in each event at the Olympic Qualifying Time (OQT), and potentially 1 at the Olympic Selection Time (OST)):

Athlete	Event	Heat		Semifinal		Final	
Athlete	Event	Time	Rank	Time	Rank	Time	Rank
Timothy Wynter	Men's 100 m backstroke	57.20	34	Did not advance			
Alia Atkinson	Women's 100 m breaststroke	1:06.72	7 Q	1:06.52	6 Q	1:08.10	8

== See also ==
- Jamaica at the 2015 Pan American Games
- Jamaica at the 2016 Winter Youth Olympics
