= 2026 African Championships in Athletics – Men's triple jump =

Men's triple jump at the 2026 African Championships in Athletics
- Venue: Legon Sports Stadium
- Location: Accra, Ghana
- Dates: 16 May
- Competitors: 12 from 9 nations
- Winning time: 17.00w

Medalists
gold medal	Amath Faye	Senegal
silver medal	Adel Cupidon	Mauritius
bronze medal	Yoann Awhansou	Benin

The men's triple jump event at the 2026 African Championships in Athletics was held on 16 May in Accra, Ghana.

== Results ==
Rank	Athlete	Nationality	#1	#2	#3	#4	#5	#6	Result	Notes
1st place, gold medalist(s)	Amath Faye	Senegal							17.00w	
2nd place, silver medalist(s)	Adel Cupidon	Mauritius							16.61	
3rd place, bronze medalist(s)	Yoann Awhansou	Benin							16.60w	
4	Albert Kwaku Gyabaah Kontor	Ghana							16.25	
5	Bienvenu Sawadogo	Burkina Faso							15.94w	
6	David Afrikaner	Namibia							15.84w	
7	Philemon Azumah	Ghana							15.83w	
8	Bekele Jilo	Ethiopia							15.75w	
9	Derrick Gama	Cameroon							15.67w	
10	Gilbert Pkemoi	Kenya							15.57w	
11	Amos Musili	Kenya							15.35w	
12	Abdoul Rachid Traore	Burkina Faso							15.01w	
	Raymond Nkewy Tchomfa	Cameroon							DNS	
	Yacouba Loue	Burkina Faso							DNS	
	N'zebou Guy Lebon Attoungbre	Ivory Coast							DNS	
