= Peterson dos Santos =

Brazilian sprinter (born 1991)

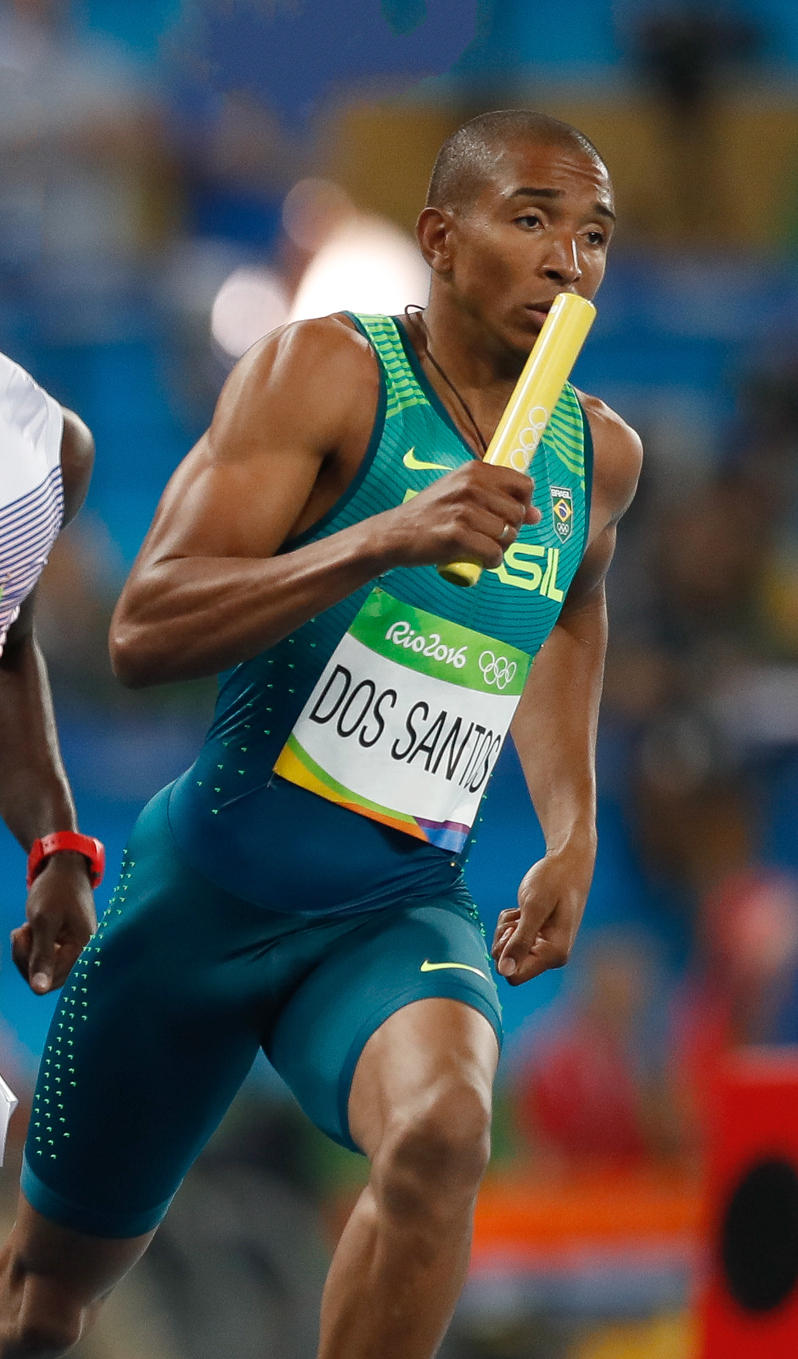
- Dos Santos at the 2016 Olympics

Personal information
- Born: 31 March 1991 (age 35) Santana, Brazil
- Height: 181 cm (5 ft 11 in)
- Weight: 70 kg (154 lb)

Sport
- Sport: Athletics
- Event: 400 m
- Club: Pinheiros
- Coached by: Sanderlei Parrela

Achievements and titles
- Personal best: 400 m – 45.90 (2014)

Peterson dos Santos (born 31 March 1991) is a Brazilian sprinter. He competed in the 4 × 400 m relay at the 2016 Olympics.
