= Yoann Awhansou =

Beninese track and field athlete (1999)

Personal information
- Full name: Yoann Michel Sourou Awhansou
- Born: 6 October 1999 (age 26)

Sport
- Country: Benin
- Sport: Athletics
- Event: Triple jump

Achievements and titles
- Personal best(s): Triple jump: 16.65 m (Carquefou, 2025)
Medal record
Men's athletics
Representing Benin
African Championships
Bronze medal – third place	2026 Accra	Triple jump

Yoann Michel Sourou Awhansou (born 6 October 1999) is a France-based triple jumper who represents Benin internationally.

== Biography ==
He is a member of Saint Denis Émotion athletics club in France. He placed third in the French Indoor Athletics Championships in February 2024 in Miramas with a triple jump of 15.87 metres. He finished fourth overall in the triple jump at the 2024 African Athletics Championships in June 2024, with a best jump of 16.12 metres in Douala, Cameroon.

He jumped 16.25 metres to win at the Championnats de France Nationaux en salle in Nantes in February 2025. He then jumped 16.29 meters for the third best jump at the French Indoor Athletics Championships later that month, behind Melvin Raffin and Thomas Gogois.

He set a new personal best of 16.65 metres (+1.3) to win in France at the Meeting National de Carquefou in June 2025. He jumped 15.73 metres to win the Beninese Championships in August 2025. Having qualified via his world ranking of 36th position, he competed at the 2025 World Championships in Tokyo, Japan, in September 2025.

In May 2026, he won the bronze medal in the triple jump at the 2026 African Championships in Athletics in Accra, Ghana.
