= Athletics at the 2016 Summer Olympics – Men's 4 × 400 metres relay =

Men's 4 × 400 metres relay at the Games of the XXXI Olympiad
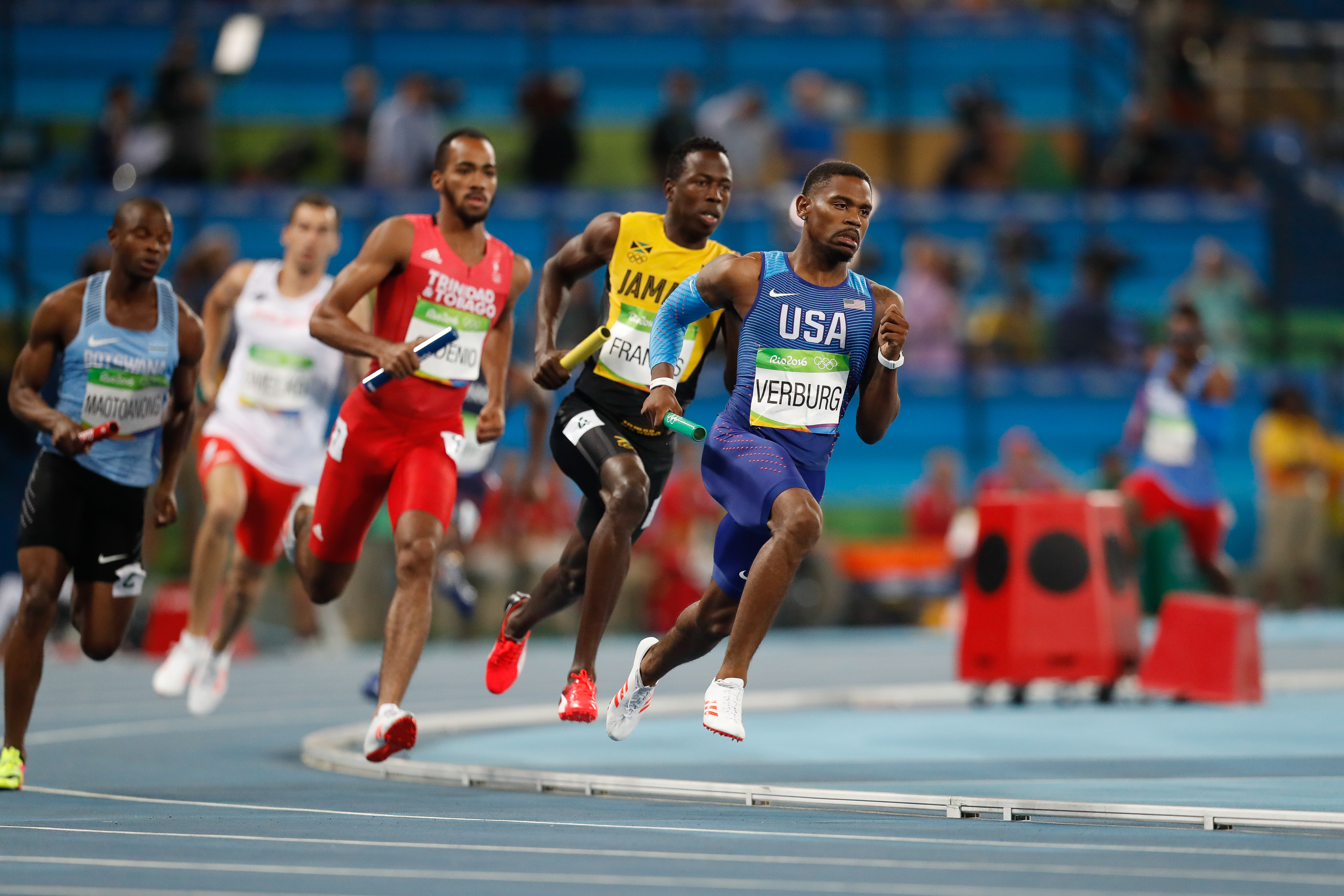
- Verburg (USA) leading from Francis (JAM) during the heats of the men's 4 × 400 metres relay
- Venue: Estádio Olímpico João Havelange
- Date: 19–20 August 2016
- Competitors: from 16 nations
- Teams: 16
- Winning time: 2:57.30

Medalists
1st place, gold medalist(s)		Arman Hall; Tony McQuay; Gil Roberts; LaShawn Merritt; Kyle Clemons*; David Verburg*	United States
2nd place, silver medalist(s)		Peter Matthews; Nathon Allen; Fitzroy Dunkley; Javon Francis; Rusheen McDonald*	Jamaica
3rd place, bronze medalist(s)		Alonzo Russell; Michael Mathieu; Steven Gardiner; Chris Brown; Stephen Newbold*	Bahamas

'Video on YouTube Official Video]

The men's 4 × 400 metres relay competition at the 2016 Summer Olympics in Rio de Janeiro, Brazil was held at the Estádio Olímpico João Havelange on 19–20 August.

== Summary ==
The Bahamas entered as the defending Olympic champions while United States had won both the 2013 and 2015 World Championships since then. Louisiana State University held the world leading time of 3:00.38 minutes prior to the event. The American college team was anchored by Fitzroy Dunkley who ran for Jamaica here. Trinidad and Tobago, medallists at both the last Olympics and World Championships, were the next strongest team. Other teams entering with fast quartets were Jamaica, Great Britain and 2016 European champions Belgium.

As in 2012, the heats produced some drama. During the first handoff, in lanes, Trinidad and Tobago leadoff leg, Jarrin Solomon stepped inside of the lane line. He had already let go of the baton to Lalonde Gordon but the team was disqualified. In the second semi-final both Great Britain and India were disqualified for starting their leg with a foot outside of the passing zone.

The final began with Botswana's Isaac Makwala, the seventh fastest man in history and Jamaica's Peter Matthews taking it out hard. Matthews had passed Belgium's Julien Watrin at the head of the stretch, but Watrin pulled it back as Matthews slowed. Botswana made the handoff first. USA's Arman Hall also pulled back some ground from Matthews as USA exchanged even with Jamaica. Tony McQuay ran the turn hard to get the jump on Botswana's fifth place open sprinter, 18 year old Karabo Sibanda at the break. Michael Mathieu also put Bahamas ahead of Jamaica's Nathon Allen who was in a battle with Jonathan Borlée, the first of three successive Borlée brothers for Belgium.

Coming off the turn, Sibanda put the move on McQuay, putting Botswana into the lead, 5 metres back, Allen put the same move on Mathieu to put Jamaica into third. Because USA had the lead at the half way mark of the lap, Sibanda had to move back out to lane 2 to find his teammate Onkabetse Nkobolo. McQuay used the opening to move back even with Sibanda. After receiving the handoff Nkobolo ran into the back of American Gil Roberts who was still in the process of receiving the baton, Nkobolo lost all forward momentum and Roberts gained the edge coming out of the handoff. A meter down, Nkobolo stuck behind Roberts as if there was a rope between them. Behind them, Jamaica's Fitzroy Dunkley was closing the gap. Coming off the turn, unimpeded, Roberts stumbled and lost his balance, throwing his baton hand high in the air to right himself and avert a disaster by stepping inside of the curb. Dunkley slowed down the stretch, Steven Gardiner pulling Bahamas back even.

The final handoff, Roberts to bronze medalist LaShawn Merritt, Botswana to Leaname Maotoanong was clean. Bahamas' "Fireman" Chris Brown gained the edge over Jamaica's Javon Francis on their handoff three metres up on the Borlée brothers. Down the backstretch and into the final turn, Maotoanong stayed consistently about 2 metres behind Merritt as Brown, Francis and Kevin Borlée crept closer. Francis went for the pass during the turn but Brown held him off to the straightaway. Merritt began to pull away from Maotoanong. Running in lane 2, Francis got past Brown then squeezed him out of running space as he passed Maotoanong. Brown had to move into lane 2. Getting passed, Maotoanong began to struggle, flailing his arms but running backward. Brown went by on the outside, Borlée went by on the inside. Merritt crossed the finish line seven metres up on Francis to give America gold over Jamaica's silver. Three more metres back, Borlée was making a mighty rush at Brown, dipping and diving too late to get the bronze as Bahamas held on while Borlée crashed to the track.

Belgium and Botswana both set national records in the heats and finals. McQuay's leg was timed as 43.2, tied for the fourth fastest relay splits in history.

The medals for the competition were presented by Angela Ruggiero, IOC member, and the gifts were presented by Alberto Juantorena, IAAF Council Member.

== Records ==
Prior to the competition, the existing World and Olympic records were as follows.

World record	United States (Andrew Valmon, Quincy Watts, Butch Reynolds, Michael Johnson)	2:54.29	Stuttgart, Germany	22 August 1993
Olympic record	United States (LaShawn Merritt, Angelo Taylor, David Neville, Jeremy Wariner)	2:55.39	Beijing, China	23 August 2008
2016 World leading	Louisiana State University (LaMar Bruton, Michael Cherry, Cyril Grayson, Fitzroy Dunkley)	3:00.38	Baton Rouge, United States	23 April 2016

The following records were established during the competition:

Date	Event	Competitors	Nation	Time	Record
19 August	Heats	Rusheen McDonald, Peter Matthews, Nathon Allen, Javon Francis	Jamaica	2:58.29	2016 World Leading
20 August	Final	Arman Hall, Tony McQuay, Gil Roberts, LaShawn Merritt	United States	2:57.30	2016 World Leading

The following national records were established during the competition:

Country	Athletes	Round	Time	Notes
Botswana	Isaac Makwala, Karabo Sibanda, Onkabetse Nkobolo, Leaname Maotoanong (BOT)	Heats	2:59.35	
Belgium	Julien Watrin, Jonathan Borlée, Dylan Borlée, Kevin Borlée (BEL)	Heats	2:59.25	
Belgium	Julien Watrin, Jonathan Borlée, Dylan Borlée, Kevin Borlée (BEL)	Final	2:58.52	
Botswana	Isaac Makwala, Karabo Sibanda, Onkabetse Nkobolo, Leaname Maotoanong (BOT)	Final	2:59.06	

== Schedule ==
All times are Brazil time (UTC−3)

Date	Time	Round
Friday, 19 August 2016	21:10	Heats
Saturday, 20 August 2016	22:35	Finals

== Results ==
=== Heats ===
Qualification rule: first 3 of each heat (Q) plus the 2 fastest times (q) qualified.

==== Heat 1 ====
Rank	Nation	Competitors	Time	Notes
1	Jamaica	Rusheen McDonald, Peter Matthews, Nathon Allen, Javon Francis	2:58.29	Q, WL
2	United States	Arman Hall, Tony McQuay, Kyle Clemons, David Verburg	2:58.38	Q, SB
3	Botswana	Isaac Makwala, Karabo Sibanda, Onkabetse Nkobolo, Leaname Maotoanong	2:59.35	Q, NR
4	Poland	Łukasz Krawczuk, Michał Pietrzak, Jakub Krzewina, Rafał Omelko	2:59.58	q, SB
5	France	Mame-Ibra Anne, Teddy Atine-Venel, Mamadou Kassé Hann, Thomas Jordier	3:00.82	SB
6	Colombia	Anthony Zambrano, Diego Palomeque, Carlos Lemos, Jhon Perlaza	3:01.84	
7	Japan	Julian Walsh, Tomoya Tamura, Takamasa Kitagawa, Nobuya Kato	3:02.95	
–	Trinidad and Tobago	Jarrin Solomon, Lalonde Gordon, Deon Lendore, Machel Cedenio	DQ	R 163.3a

==== Heat 2 ====
Rank	Nation	Competitors	Time	Notes
1	Belgium	Julien Watrin, Jonathan Borlée, Dylan Borlée, Kevin Borlée	2:59.25	Q, NR
2	Bahamas	Alonzo Russell, Chris Brown, Steven Gardiner, Stephen Newbold	2:59.64	Q, SB
3	Cuba	William Collazo, Adrian Chacón, Osmaidel Pellicier, Yoandys Lescay	3:00.16	Q, SB
4	Brazil	Pedro Luiz de Oliveira, Alexander Russo, Peterson dos Santos, Hugo de Sousa	3:00.43	q, SB
5	Dominican Republic	Yon Soriano, Luguelín Santos, Luis Charles, Gustavo Cuesta	3:01.76	SB
6	Venezuela	Arturo Ramírez, Omar Longart, Alberth Bravo, Freddy Mezones	3:02.69	
–	Great Britain	Nigel Levine, Delano Williams, Matthew Hudson-Smith, Martyn Rooney	DQ	R 170.19
–	India	Kunhu Muhammed, Muhammad Anas, Ayyasamy Dharun, Arokia Rajiv	DQ	R 170.19

=== Final ===
Rank	Lane	Nation	Competitors	Time	Notes
1st place, gold medalist(s)	5	United States	Arman Hall, Tony McQuay, Gil Roberts, LaShawn Merritt	2:57.30	WL
2nd place, silver medalist(s)	3	Jamaica	Peter Matthews, Nathon Allen, Fitzroy Dunkley, Javon Francis	2:58.16	SB
3rd place, bronze medalist(s)	6	Bahamas	Alonzo Russell, Michael Mathieu, Steven Gardiner, Chris Brown	2:58.49	SB
4	4	Belgium	Julien Watrin, Jonathan Borlée, Dylan Borlée, Kevin Borlée	2:58.52	NR
5	7	Botswana	Isaac Makwala, Karabo Sibanda, Onkabetse Nkobolo, Leaname Maotoanong	2:59.06	NR
6	8	Cuba	William Collazo, Adrian Chacón, Osmaidel Pellicier, Yoandys Lescay	2:59.53	SB
7	2	Poland	Łukasz Krawczuk, Michał Pietrzak, Jakub Krzewina, Rafał Omelko	3:00.50	
8	1	Brazil	Pedro Luiz de Oliveira, Alexander Russo, Peterson dos Santos, Hugo de Sousa	3:03.28	
