= 2026 African Championships in Athletics – Men's long jump =

Men's long jump at the 2026 African Championships in Athletics
- Venue: Legon Sports Stadium
- Location: Accra, Ghana
- Dates: 11–12 May
- Competitors: 19 from 16 nations
- Winning time: 8.15w

Medalists
gold medal	Luvo Manyonga	South Africa
silver medal	Lys Mendy	Senegal
bronze medal	Amath Faye	Senegal

The men's long jump event at the 2026 African Championships in Athletics was held on 11 and 12 May in Accra, Ghana.

== Results ==
=== Final ===
Rank	Group	Athlete	Nationality	#1	#2	#3	Result	Notes
1	A	Amath Faye	Senegal				7.80w	q
2	B	David Berkham Otim	Uganda				7.79w	q
3	A	Romeo N'tia	Benin				7.77w	q
3	B	Luvo Manyonga	South Africa				7.77w	q
5	B	Tarek Hocine	Algeria				7.75	q
6	B	Lys Mendy	Senegal				7.69w	q
7	A	Buli Melaku	Ethiopia				7.61w	q
8	B	Otchere Mensah	Ghana				7.51w	q
9	B	Komi Bernard Konu	Togo				7.41w	q
10	A	Isaac Kimunu	Kenya				7.37w	q
11	A	Appolinaire Yinra	Cameroon				7.36w	q
12	A	Chenoult Coetzee	Namibia				7.29	q
13	A	Bernard Kalale	Zambia				7.17w	
14	A	Romeo Bernard	Nigeria				7.13w	
15	B	Fredy Kevin Oyono	Cameroon				7.08w	
16	B	Moise Musongebanza	Democratic Republic of the Congo				7.07w	
17	A	Ibrahim Sawadogo	Burkina Faso				6.99w	
	B	Raymond Nkwemy Tchomfa	Cameroon				NM	
	B	Josthan Galpani Ntinti	Republic of the Congo				NM	
	A	Riddy Ewolo	Republic of the Congo				DNS	

=== Final ===
Rank	Athlete	Nationality	#1	#2	#3	#4	#5	#6	Result	Notes
1st place, gold medalist(s)	Luvo Manyonga	South Africa							8.15w	
2nd place, silver medalist(s)	Lys Mendy	Senegal							8.09w	
3rd place, bronze medalist(s)	Amath Faye	Senegal							8.00w	
4	Tarek Hocine	Algeria							7.98w	
5	Chenoult Coetzee	Namibia	7.86w	7.75w	7.62w	7.75	7.74	7.95w	7.95w	
6	Buli Melaku	Ethiopia							7.86	
7	Otchere Mensah	Ghana	7.49	7.33w	7.26	x			7.49	
8	Isaac Kimunu	Kenya	7.19	7.48w	7.35	7.36	7.13w	7.35w	7.48w	
9	Komi Bernard Konu	Togo	7.26w	7.33w	7.25				7.33w	
10	Appolinaire Yinra	Cameroon	7.26w	x	7.23w				7.26w	
10	David Berkham Otim	Uganda							7.26w	
12	Romeo N'tia	Benin							5.44w	
