= Amath Faye =

Senegalese athlete (born 1996)

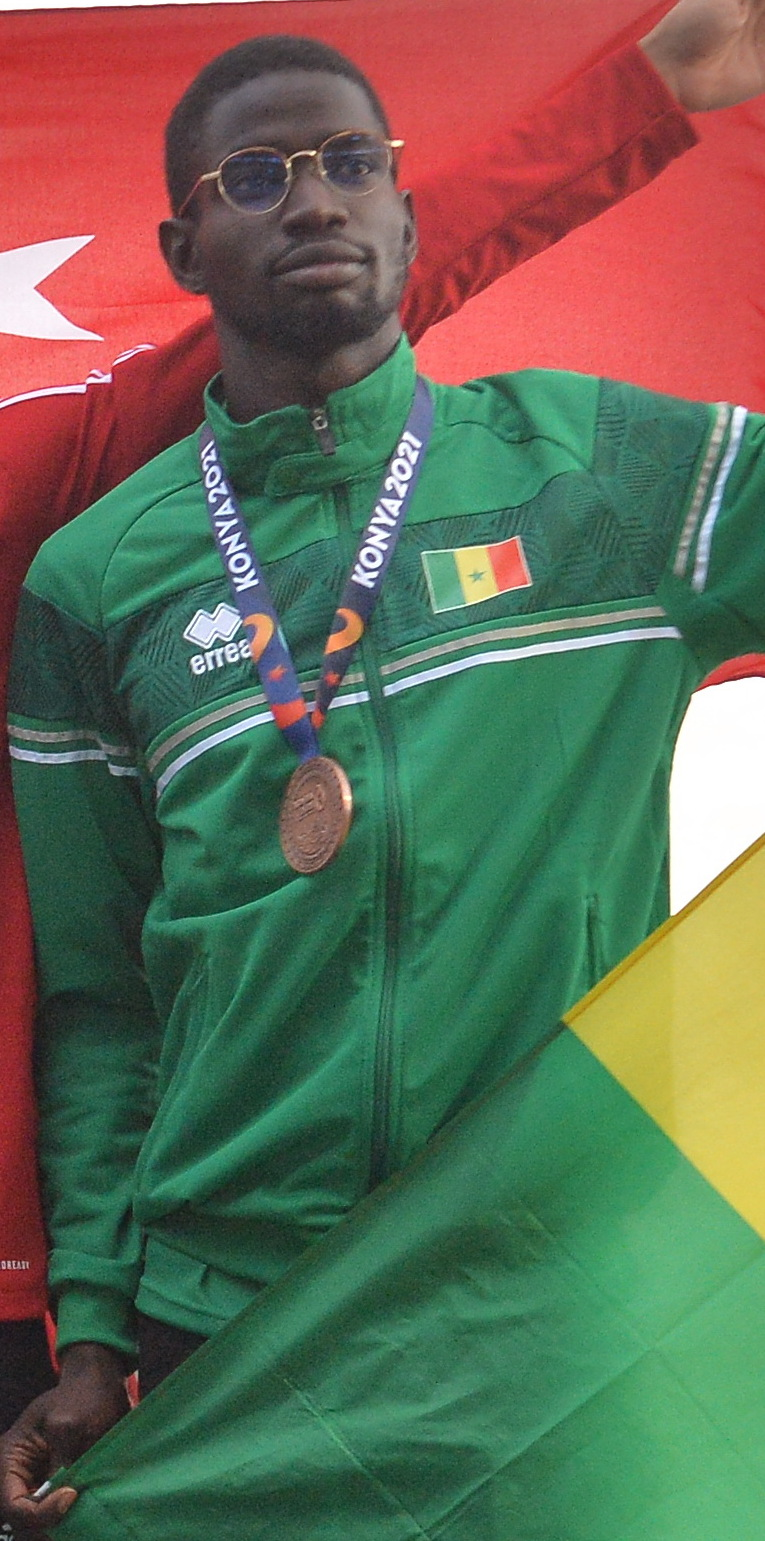
- Faye in 2022

Personal information
- Born: 3 February 1996 (age 30)

Sport
- Sport: Athletics
- Events: Long jump, Triple jump

Achievements and titles
- Personal bests: Triple Jump: 17.00m (2026); Long Jump: 7.88m (2023)
Medal record
Men's athletics
Representing Senegal
African Games
Silver medal – second place	2023 Accra	Triple jump
African Championships
Gold medal – first place	2026 Accra	Triple jump
Bronze medal – third place	2022 Mauritius	Long jump
Bronze medal – third place	2026 Accra	Long jump
Jeux de la Francophonie
Silver medal – second place	2023 Kinshasa	Triple jump

Amath Faye (born 3 February 1996) is a Senegalese athlete who competes in the long jump and triple jump. He has represented Senegal at multiple major championships, winning the gold medal in the triple jump at the 2026 African Championships in Athletics and the silver medal in the triple jump at the 2023 African Games.

== Biography ==
He won a bronze medal in the long jump at the 2022 African Championships in St Pierre, Mauritius. He set a personal best in the long jump of 7.88 metres on 10 June 2023 at the Meeting National de Pierre-Bénite in France.

He won the silver medal in the triple jump with a best jump of 16.61 metres at the 2023 Francophone Games in Kinshasa, Democratic Republic of Congo. He won the silver medal in the triple jump at the delayed 2023 African Games, held in Accra, Ghana, in March 2024 with a jump of 16.24 metres. He had a fifth place finish in the triple jump at the 2024 African Championships in Douala, Cameroon.

He set a new personal best in the triple jump of 16.69 metres in Dakar on 24 May 2025. In September 2025, he competed at the 2025 World Championships in Tokyo, Japan.

On 30 January 2026, Faye increased his triple jump personal best with 16.79m to win the Elite Indoor Miramas Meeting, a World Athletics Indoor Tour silver meeting, in Miramas. He placed eighth at the 2026 World Athletics Indoor Championships in Poland, with a best jump of 16.76 metres. In May 2026, he won the bronze medal in the long jump at the 2026 African Championships in Athletics in Accra. He then won the triple jump gold medal with a personal best jump of 17.00m on his final attempt at the championships.
