= Luvo Manyonga =

South African long jumper

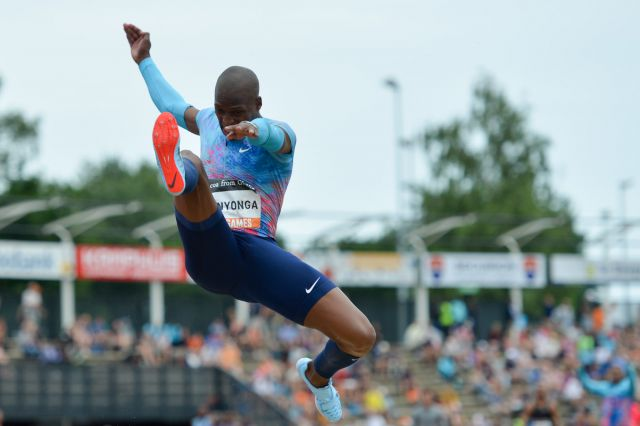

Personal information
- Nationality: South African
- Born: January 8, 1991 (age 35) Mbekweni
- Height: 1.89 m (6 ft 2 in)
- Weight: 82 kg (181 lb)

Sport
- Sport: Men's athletics
- Event: Long jump
- Coached by: Mario Smith (2009 - 2012); Neil Cornelius (2015 - 2018)

Achievements and titles
- Personal best: 8.65 m (28 ft 4 1/2 in) (2017)
Medal record
Men's athletics
Representing South Africa
Olympic Games
Silver medal – second place	2016 Rio de Janeiro	Long jump
World Championships
Gold medal – first place	2017 London	Long jump
World Indoor Championships
Silver medal – second place	2018 Birmingham	Long jump
African Games
Gold medal – first place	2011 Maputo	Long jump
African Championships
Gold medal – first place	2026 Accra	Long jump
Silver medal – second place	2016 Durban	Long jump
Silver medal – second place	2018 Asaba	Long jump
Commonwealth Games
Gold medal – first place	2018 Gold Coast	Long jump
World Junior Championships
Gold medal – first place	2010 Moncton	Long jump

Luvo Manyonga (born 8 January 1991) is a South African track and field athlete who specialises in the long jump. He won the 2017 World Championship in London and the 2018 Commonwealth Games title in the Gold Coast, Australia. He was the Olympic silver medallist in 2016 in Rio de Janeiro.

Manyonga was world junior champion in 2010, and the African Games champion in 2011. He competed at the 2011 World Championships in Athletics, placing fifth. He was the runner-up at the 2016 African Championships in Athletics.

During his career, Manyonga has been served with two doping bans. His second ban was issued in June 2021 when he was given a four-year ban following failure to provide anti-doping officials with sufficient information to complete drug testing. The ban lasted until December 2024.

He holds a personal best of 8.65 m (28 ft 4 1/2 in), set in 2017 in Potchefstroom.

== Career ==
=== Early life and career ===
Born in 1991, Manyonga was raised by his mother in the Mbekweni township of Paarl, South Africa, after his largely absent father left her to care for him and his older brother and sister. His talent for long jump was soon recognized by local coach Mario Smith, who began mentoring him toward a professional career.

Manyonga had his first international success at the 2009 African Junior Athletics Championships. Travelling to Mauritius, he jumped 7.49 m (24 ft 6 3/4 in) for the bronze medal. He ended that year with a long jump best of 7.65 m (25 ft 1 in) as well as a triple jump of 15.54 m (50 ft 11 3/4 in).

A breakthrough came the year after when he jumped 8.19 m (26 ft 10 1/4 in) to win at the Weltklasse in Biberach in Germany. This jump was in the top ten all-time by an under-20 athlete at that point. He delivered on that performance with a gold medal at the 2010 World Junior Championships in Athletics, becoming only the second African to win a horizontal jumps medal at the competition (after fellow South African Godfrey Khotso Mokoena). Seeing his progress, he set himself targets to qualify for the 2010 Commonwealth Games and the 2012 London Olympics.

=== Africa Games champion ===
He arrived on the senior international scene in the 2011 season. Competing in Finland that July, he cleared a personal best of 8.26 m (27 ft 1 in), which ranked him in the top 15 in the world that year. He qualified to represent South Africa at the 2011 World Championships in Athletics. After qualifying for the final, Manyonga's opened the final with a jump of 8.21 m (26 ft 11 in), which was his best of the competition and brought him fifth place at his first major competition.

Two weeks later he appeared at the All-Africa Games and defeated former champions Ignisious Gaisah and Ndiss Kaba Badji to take the gold medal. He was runner-up at the DecaNation in his last top level performance of the year.

=== Tik use and doping suspension ===
In 2012, Manyonga opened his season with an eight-metre jump but struggled with the pressure of managing his prize money, as friends and family became financially dependent on him. This led to debt and increased stress, while his coach Mario Smith stepped in to support his family. Around this time, Manyonga became addicted to tik, a local form of crystal meth, which he had first tried in 2011. He tested positive during a competition in March and admitted to using the drug recreationally, resulting in an 18-month ban from the sport. At his doping hearing, Smith advocated for leniency, citing Manyonga's poor background and lack of doping education.

After serving his suspension, Manyonga attempted a comeback in 2014, but paperwork issues kept him out of the 2014 Commonwealth Games. That same year, Smith died in a car crash on his way to visit Manyonga, who, spiraling again, missed the memorial after relapsing. The head of the National Olympic Committee, Gideon Sam, visited his home and, seeing his condition, arranged support and training at the High Performance Centre in Pretoria. Motivated by the fresh start, Manyonga resumed full-time training in 2015.

=== Return to track and second ban ===
Having missed four outdoor seasons since 2012, Manyonga returned to professional track competition in 2016. His talent had not dimmed and he cleared a world-leading and personal best distance of 8.30 m (27 ft 2 3/4 in) in Pretoria in March. He faltered at the South African Athletics Championships, mistiming his jumps and ending in 13th place. He was back over eight metres on his IAAF Diamond League debut at the Golden Gala, then claimed his first senior medal in almost five years at the 2016 African Championships in Athletics in Durban through a wind-assisted 8.23 m (27 ft 0 in). This made it a South African 1–2 as Manyonga was runner-up to Rushwahl Samaai.

He entered the 2016 Rio Olympics ranked in the world's top ten jumpers. In the Olympics, he was in the top four throughout the competition, leaping into the lead with his fifth round 8.37 m. He was surpassed by Jeff Henderson's final jump of 8.38 m to take the Olympic silver medal.

Manyonga won the gold at the 2017 World Championships in London, jumping 8.48 metres. He went to win the gold medal at the 2018 Commonwealth Games, jumping a games record of 8.41 metres in the final.

Following a decision in June 2021, Manyonga served a four-year competition ban from December 2020 to December 2024 for a second anti-doping violation in relation to three missed tests.

=== 2025 Comeback ===
He returned to competition in 2025, and placed sixth overall at the South African Athletics Championships in April 2025 in Potchefstroom, with a best jump of 7.68 metres. In June 2025 in Potchefstroom he jumped 7.92 metres.

== Personal bests ==
- Long jump – 8.65 m (28 ft 4 1/2 in) (2017)
- Triple jump – 15.71 m (51 ft 6 1/2 in) (2010)

== International competitions ==
Year	Competition	Venue	Position	Event	Notes
2009	African Junior Championships	Bambous, Mauritius	3rd	Long jump	7.49 m
2010	World Junior Championships	Moncton, Canada	1st	Long jump	7.99 m
2011	World Championships	Daegu, South Korea	5th	Long jump	8.21 m
2011	All-Africa Games	Maputo, Mozambique	1st	Long jump	8.02 m
2016	African Championships	Durban, South Africa	2nd	Long jump	8.23 m w
2016	Olympic Games	Rio de Janeiro, Brazil	2nd	Long jump	8.37 m
2017	World Championships	London, United Kingdom	1st	Long jump	8.48 m
2018	World Indoor Championships	Birmingham, United Kingdom	2nd	Long jump	8.44 m
2018	Commonwealth Games	Gold Coast, Australia	1st	Long jump	8.41 m
2018	African Championships	Asaba, Nigeria	2nd	Long jump	8.43 m
2019	World Championships	Doha, Qatar	4th	Long jump	8.28 m
2026	World Indoor Championships	Toruń, Poland	–	Long jump	NM
2026	African Championships	Accra, Ghana	1st	Long jump	8.15 m w
