= Peter Matthews (sprinter) =

Jamaican sprinter (born 1989)

Personal information
- Born: 13 November 1989 (age 36) Manchester Parish, Jamaica
- Height: 1.88 m (6 ft 2 in)
- Weight: 85 kg (187 lb)

Sport
- Sport: Track and field
- Event: 400 metres
Medal record
Men's athletics
Representing Jamaica
Olympic Games
Silver medal – second place	2016 Rio de Janeiro	4×400 m relay
- Updated on 20 August 2016

Peter Matthews (born 13 November 1989) is a Jamaican sprinter specialising in the 400 metres. He is an Olympic silver medalist as a member of the Jamaican 4 × 400 m relay team in Rio. He competed at the 2015 World Championships in Beijing reaching the semifinals. In addition, he won the silver medal at the 2011 Summer Universiade.

His personal best in the event is 44.69 set in the qualifying round at Beijing in 2015. Matthews ran for University of Technology, Jamaica.

== International competitions ==
Year	Competition	Venue	Position	Event	Notes
Representing Jamaica
2011	Universiade	Shenzhen, China	2nd	400 m	45.62
2011	Universiade	Shenzhen, China	–	4 × 100 m relay	DQ
2015	World Championships	Beijing, China	22nd (sf)	400 m	45.42
2015	World Championships	Beijing, China	4th	4 × 400 m relay	2:58.51
2017	IAAF World Relays	Nassau, The Bahamas	3rd	4 × 400 m relay	3:02.84
2017	World Championships	London, United Kingdom	9th (h)	4 × 400 m relay	3:01.98
2018	Commonwealth Games	Gold Coast, Queensland	1st (h)	4 × 400 m relay	3:03.97
