= Fitzroy Dunkley =

Jamaican sprinter (born 1993)

Personal information
- Born: 20 May 1993 (age 33)
- Education: Louisiana State University
- Height: 1.95 m (6 ft 5 in)
- Weight: 79 kg (174 lb)

Sport
- Sport: Athletics
- Event: 400 metres
- College team: LSU Tigers
Medal record
Men's athletics
Representing Jamaica
Olympic Games
Silver medal – second place	2016 Rio de Janeiro	4×400 m relay

Fitzroy Junior Dunkley (born 20 May 1993) is a Jamaican sprinter. He represented his country at the 2016 IAAF World Indoor Championships reaching semifinals individually and finishing fourth in the relay.

His personal bests in the event are 45.06 seconds outdoors (Eugene 2016) and 46.04 seconds indoors (Fayetteville 2016).

== Competition record ==
Year	Competition	Venue	Position	Event	Notes
Representing Jamaica
2015	Universiade	Gwangju, South Korea	11th (h)	400 m	47.32^{1}
2016	World Indoor Championships	Portland, United States	11th (sf)	400 m	47.13
2016	World Indoor Championships	Portland, United States	4th	4 × 400 m relay	3:06.02
2016	Olympic Games	Rio de Janeiro, Brazil	24th (h)	400 m	45.66
2016	Olympic Games	Rio de Janeiro, Brazil	2nd	4 × 400 m relay	2:58.16
2018	NACAC Championships	Toronto, Canada	3rd	400 m	45.76
2018	NACAC Championships	Toronto, Canada	–	4 × 400 m relay	DQ

^{1}Did not start in the semifinals
