= Javon Francis =

Jamaican sprinter (born 1994)

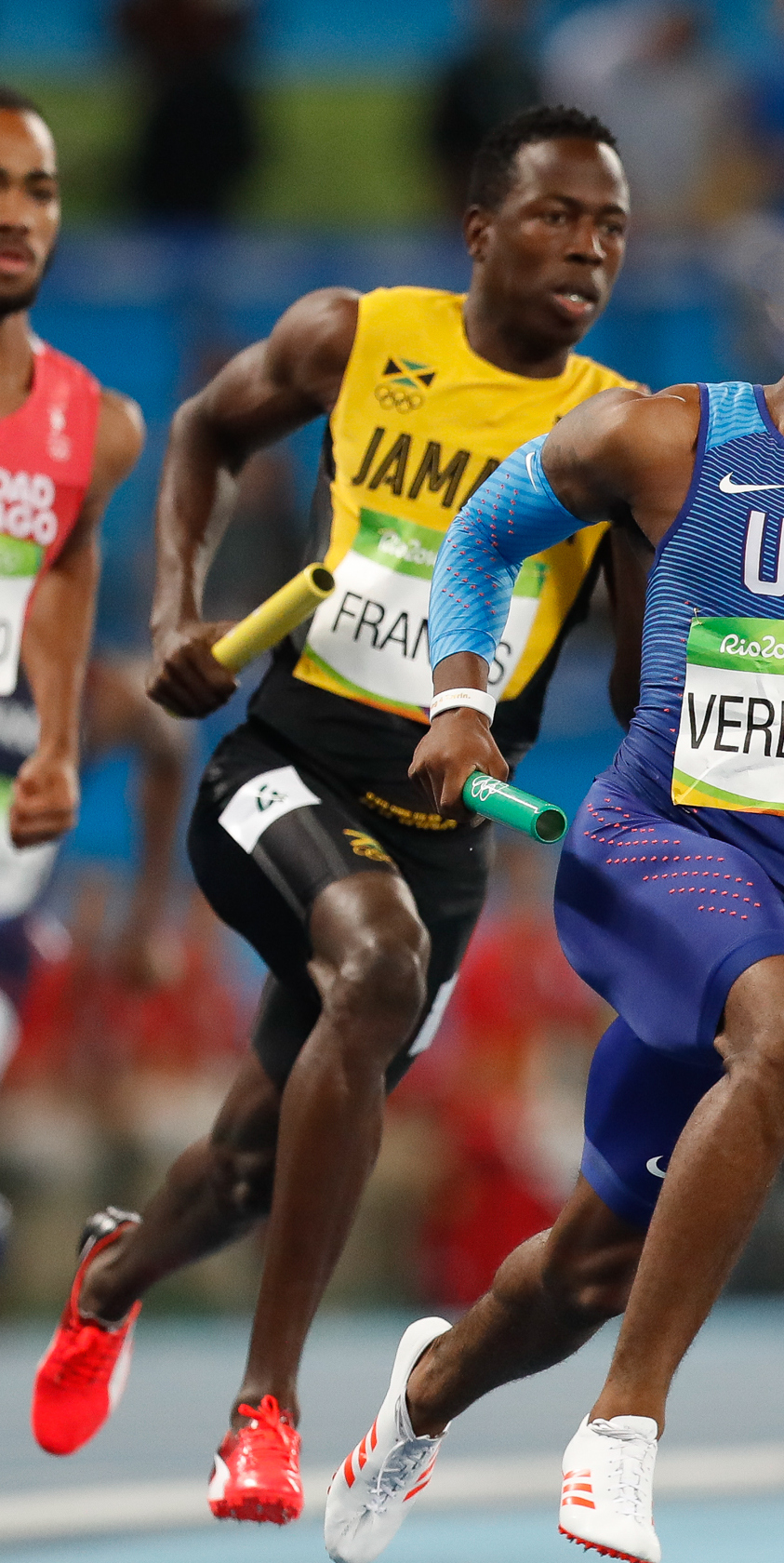
- Francis at the 2016 Olympics

Personal information
- Born: 14 December 1994 (age 31) Kingston, Jamaica
- Height: 1.83 m (6 ft 0 in)
- Weight: 68 kg (150 lb)

Sport
- Country: Jamaica
- Sport: Track and field
- Event: Sprinting
- Club: AKAN Track Club
- Coached by: Michael Clarke; Fitz Coleman

Achievements and titles
- Personal bests: 200 m – 20.54 (2016); 400 m – 44.50 (2015)
Medal record
Representing Jamaica
Olympic Games
Silver medal – second place	2016 Rio de Janeiro	4×400 m relay
World Championships
Silver medal – second place	2013 Moscow	4×400 m relay
Silver medal – second place	2019 Doha	4×400 m relay
Silver medal – second place	2019 Doha	4×400 m mixed
Commonwealth Games
Bronze medal – third place	2018 Gold Coast	400 m
Bronze medal – third place	2018 Gold Coast	4×400 m relay
NACAC Championships
Silver medal – second place	2022 Freeport	4×400 m relay
CAC Junior Championships (U20)
Gold medal – first place	2012 San Salvador	4×400 m relay

Javon Francis (born 14 December 1994) is a Jamaican sprinter specializing in the 400 metres and 4 x 400 metres relay.

== Biography ==
He attended Calabar High School in St. Andrew, Jamaica.

== Career ==
He won silver medals in the 4 × 400 m relay at the 2013 World Championships and 2016 Olympics. At the 2016 Olympics he also took part in the individual 400 m event, but was eliminated in the semifinal. He was the flag bearer for Jamaica during the closing ceremony.

In a 2024 newspaper feature, the article stated he has been hampered by injuries for the past few seasons, which prevented him from performing at the highest level. Javon is known for his skill in relay running.
