= Athletics at the 2003 All-Africa Games – Men's long jump =

The men's long jump event at the 2003 All-Africa Games was held on October 14.

== Results ==
Rank	Name	Nationality	Result	Notes
1st place, gold medalist(s)	Ignisious Gaisah	Ghana	8.30	
2nd place, silver medalist(s)	Ndiss Kaba Badji	Senegal	7.92	
3rd place, bronze medalist(s)	Godfrey Khotso Mokoena	South Africa	7.83	
4	Nabil Adamou	Algeria	7.83	
5	Gable Garenamotse	Botswana	7.82	
6	Robert Martey	Ghana	7.66	
7	Arnaud Casquette	Mauritius	7.56	
8	Alia Soumah	Guinea	6.70	
9	Valdemar Afonso	São Tomé and Príncipe	6.45	
	Sékou Sylla	Guinea	DNS	
	Remmy Limo	Kenya	DNS	
