= Athletics at the 2007 All-Africa Games – Men's long jump =

The men's long jump at the 2007 All-Africa Games was held on July 20–22.

== Medalists ==
Gold	Silver	Bronze
Gable Garenamotse; Botswana	Arnaud Casquette; Mauritius	Khotso Mokoena; South Africa

== Results ==
=== Qualification ===
Qualifying perf. 7.85 (Q) or 12 best performers (q) advanced to the Final.

Rank	Group	Athlete	Nationality	Result	Notes
1	A	Khotso Mokoena	South Africa	8.21w	Q
2	B	Issam Nima	Algeria	8.05	Q
3	B	Ndiss Kaba Badji	Senegal	8.03	Q
4	B	Gable Garenamotse	Botswana	7.90	Q
5	B	Arnaud Casquette	Mauritius	7.86	Q
6	A	Ignisious Gaisah	Ghana	7.80	q
7	A	Keenan Watson	South Africa	7.74w	q
8	A	Ngonidzashe Makusha	Zimbabwe	7.69	q
9	A	Stephan Louw	Namibia	7.68	q
10	B	Mamadou Chérif Dia	Mali	7.67	q
11	B	Tunde Suleiman	Nigeria	7.65	q
12	A	Stanley Gbabeke	Nigeria	7.52	q
13	B	Yah Fosu Amoah	South Africa	7.35	
14	A	Sewa Sourou	Benin	7.17	
15	A	Gui Bertrand Boissy	Senegal	7.09	
16	B	Cadeau Kelley	Liberia	7.00	
17	B	Alia Soumah	Guinea	6.39	
	A	Emeka Okozi	Nigeria	DNS	

=== Final ===
Rank	Athlete	Nationality	Result	Notes
1st place, gold medalist(s)	Gable Garenamotse	Botswana	8.08	
2nd place, silver medalist(s)	Arnaud Casquette	Mauritius	8.03	
3rd place, bronze medalist(s)	Khotso Mokoena	South Africa	7.99	
4	Issam Nima	Algeria	7.98	
5	Ndiss Kaba Badji	Senegal	7.84	
6	Tunde Suleiman	Nigeria	7.76	SB
7	Mamadou Chérif Dia	Mali	7.75	
8	Keenan Watson	South Africa	7.62	
9	Stephan Louw	Namibia	7.62	
10	Stanley Gbabeke	Nigeria	7.43	
	Ignisious Gaisah	Ghana	DNS	
	Ngonidzashe Makusha	Zimbabwe	DNS	
