= 2010 African Championships in Athletics – Men's long jump =

The men's long jump at the 2010 African Championships in Athletics was held on July 28–29.

== Medalists ==
Gold	Silver	Bronze
Khotso Mokoena; South Africa	Ndiss Kaba Badji; Senegal	Stanley Gbagbeke; Nigeria

== Results ==
=== Qualification ===
Qualifying perf. 7.85 (Q) or 12 best performers (q) advanced to the Final.

Rank	Group	Athlete	Nationality	#1	#2	#3	Result	Notes
1	B	Khotso Mokoena	South Africa	8.12			8.12	Q
2	B	Ndiss Kaba Badji	Senegal	8.09			8.09	Q
3	B	Mohammed Deifalla Gawy	Egypt	7.29	7.70	7.80	7.80	q
4	A	Tera Langat	Kenya	7.48	7.72	X	7.72	q
5	B	Mamadou Cherif Dia	Mali	6.77	X	7.72	7.72	q
6	A	Abdelhakim Mlaab	Morocco	7.69	7.50	X	7.69	q
7	A	Issam Nima	Algeria	7.65	7.61	7.53	7.65	q
8	A	Samson Idiata	Nigeria	7.61	7.50	7.65	7.65	q
9	B	Stanley Gbagbeke	Nigeria	7.63	–	X	7.63	q
10	B	Robert Martey	Ghana	7.53	7.54	7.33	7.54	q
11	A	Ignisious Gaisah	Ghana	7.54	–	–	7.54	q
12	A	Elijah Kimitei	Kenya	7.31	7.40	7.46	7.46	q
13	A	Peggy Sita Kihoue	Republic of the Congo	7.25	7.10	X	7.25	SB
14	A	Ala Eddie Ben Hassine	Tunisia	X	7.06	7.23	7.23	
15	B	Paul Koech	Kenya	6.81	7.15	7.02	7.15	
16	A	Jude Sidonie	Seychelles	6.95	7.08	7.13	7.13	
17	B	Derbew Tadesse	Ethiopia	6.66	5.66	6.66	6.66	
	B	Ben Omar Bande	Burkina Faso	X	X	X	NM	
	A	Cadeau Kelley	Liberia				DNS	
	B	Jonathan Chimier	Mauritius				DNS	

=== Final ===
Rank	Athlete	Nationality	#1	#2	#3	#4	#5	#6	Result	Notes
1st place, gold medalist(s)	Khotso Mokoena	South Africa	7.98	8.06	7.96	8.23	–	X	8.23	SB
2nd place, silver medalist(s)	Ndiss Kaba Badji	Senegal	8.10	X	8.10	6.96	7.70	–	8.10	
3rd place, bronze medalist(s)	Stanley Gbagbeke	Nigeria	8.02	8.03	8.03	7.90	8.06	6.71	8.06	
4	Mohammed Deifalla Gawy	Egypt	X	7.80	7.89	7.80	7.50	7.47	7.89	
5	Issam Nima	Algeria	7.72	7.84	7.75	7.74	7.66	X	7.84	
6	Mamadou Cherif Dia	Mali	7.73	X	X	7.70	X	X	7.73	
7	Robert Martey	Ghana	X	7.67	7.36	7.29	7.59	7.37	7.67	
8	Samson Idiata	Nigeria	7.51	5.62	7.20	X	5.42	X	7.51	
9	Elijah Kimitei	Kenya	7.44	7.32	7.49				7.49	
10	Abdelhakim Mlaab	Morocco	7.48	X	7.48				7.48	
11	Tera Langat	Kenya	X	7.36	X				7.36	
	Ignisious Gaisah	Ghana							DNS	
