= Athletics at the 2002 Commonwealth Games – Men's long jump =

2002 Commonwealth games

Men's long jump at the Commonwealth Games

The men's long jump event at the 2002 Commonwealth Games was held on 30 July.

== Medalists ==
Gold	Silver	Bronze
Nathan Morgan; England	Gable Garenamotse; Botswana	Kareem Streete-Thompson; Cayman Islands

== Results ==
=== Qualification ===
Qualification: 7.90 m (Q) or at least 12 best (q) qualified for the final.

Rank	Group	Athlete	Nationality	#1	#2	#3	Result	Notes
1	A	Chris Tomlinson	England	x	7.97		7.97	Q
2	A	Osbourne Moxey	Bahamas	7.75	7.92		7.92	Q
3	B	James Beckford	Jamaica	7.91			7.91	Q
4	B	Kareem Streete-Thompson	Cayman Islands	7.58	7.80	–	7.80	q
5	B	Nathan Morgan	England	7.66	7.64	7.77	7.77	q
6	A	Darren Ritchie	Scotland	x	7.77	7.66	7.77	q
7	A	Jonathan Chimier	Mauritius	7.75	7.46	x	7.75	q, SB
8	B	Gable Garenamotse	Botswana	7.74	x	7.64	7.74	q
9	B	Tim Parravicini	Australia	x	7.74	–	7.74	q
10	B	Arnaud Casquette	Mauritius	6.17	7.37	7.49	7.49	q
11	B	Rashid Chouhal	Malta	7.41	x	7.48	7.48	q, NR
12	A	Randy Lewis	Grenada	7.22	7.23	5.73	7.23	q
13	A	Sherwin James	Dominica	6.80	7.05	6.81	7.05	
14	A	Anthony Ohanmumwem	Nigeria	6.85	x	7.03	7.03	
15	A	Cleavon Dillon	Trinidad and Tobago	6.99	x	7.02	7.02	
16	B	Ralston Henry	British Virgin Islands	6.56	6.88	6.60	6.88	
17	B	Harmon Harmon	Cook Islands	6.63	6.37	6.56	6.63	SB
18	A	Maligie Sillah	Sierra Leone	6.32	6.25	6.22	6.32	
19	B	Karibataake Katimiri	Kiribati	x	x	6.14	6.14	SB
20	B	Nigel Faleuka	Niue	5.72	4.85	5.74	5.74	
	B	Mark Awanah	England	x	x	x	NM	
	A	Kevin Arthurton	Saint Kitts and Nevis				DNS	
	A	David Lightbourne	Turks and Caicos Islands				DNS	
	A	Gaye Talla	Gambia				DNS	

=== Final ===
Rank	Athlete	Nationality	#1	#2	#3	#4	#5	#6	Result	Notes
1st place, gold medalist(s)	Nathan Morgan	England	7.86	8.02	7.75	7.68	7.75	7.75	8.02	
2nd place, silver medalist(s)	Gable Garenamotse	Botswana	7.91	7.44	7.80	7.83	7.49	7.15	7.91	SB
3rd place, bronze medalist(s)	Kareem Streete-Thompson	Cayman Islands	7.61	7.57	7.72	7.82	7.89	7.67	7.89	
4	Darren Ritchie	Scotland	x	7.73	7.88	7.56	7.88	x	7.88	
5	Osbourne Moxey	Bahamas	7.87	x	x	x	7.85	7.76	7.87	
6	Chris Tomlinson	England	7.60	7.74	7.59	7.34	7.66	7.79	7.79	
7	Arnaud Casquette	Mauritius	x	7.64	6.95	7.47	7.35	7.64	7.64	
8	Randy Lewis	Grenada	x	7.62	x	x	7.22	7.63	7.63	
9	Tim Parravicini	Australia	x	7.53	7.60				7.60	
10	Jonathan Chimier	Mauritius	6.95	7.49	–				7.49	
	James Beckford	Jamaica	x	x	–				NM	
	Rashid Chouhal	Malta	x	x	x				NM	
