= Ruswahl Samaai =

South African long jumper

Medal record

Men's athletics

Representing South Africa

World Championships
Bronze medal – third place	2017 London	Long jump

Commonwealth Games
Bronze medal – third place	2014 Glasgow	Long jump
Bronze medal – third place	2018 Gold Coast	Long jump

African Championships
Bronze medal – third place	2014 Marrakesh	Long jump
Gold medal – first place	2016 Durban	Long jump
Gold medal – first place	2018 Asaba	Long jump

Representing Africa

Continental Cup
Gold medal – first place	2018 Ostrava	Long Jump

Ruswahl Samaai (born 25 September 1991) is a South African track and field athlete who competes in the long jump. He was the bronze medallist in the event at the 2014 and the 2018 Commonwealth Games. In 2017 he won the bronze medal in the long jump event at the World Championships held in London.

== Career ==
Samaai grew up in a poor neighbourhood of Paarl, living in a shack with his mother. He was driven to compete in athletics and would regularly walk nearly ten kilometres to the local running track to train. He attended Paarl Gimnasium and went on to study transport management at the University of Johannesburg.

He made his first impact on the national scene as a 19-year-old at the 2011 South African Championships. He placed third, behind Godfrey Khotso Mokoena and Luvo Manyonga, and set a personal best of 7.75 m (25 ft 5 in). He improved in 2012 winning the national under-23 championships in a best of 7.94 m (26 ft 1/2 in) before repeating his third place at the senior championships. He was runner-up at the University Championships and also came fourth in the triple jump with a mark of 15.79 m (51 ft 9 1/2 in). He repeated as universities runner-up in 2013 and added two further centimetres to his best.

Samaai began 2014 with an early world-leading performance of 8.10 m (26 ft 6 3/4 in) – a new personal best and his first leap over eight metres. He cleared 8.13 m (26 ft 8 in) in March, placing second to Irving Saladino in the world rankings. At the South African Championships, he came in second place behind Zarck Visser with a near-eight-metre jump. Samaai began competing on the international track and field circuit that year. He had his first podium finish on the Diamond League circuit shortly after, placing third at the Adidas Grand Prix. After that, he was second at the Folksam Grand Prix in Sweden and won at the Meeting Sport Solidarieta in Italy. Samaai was selected to represent South Africa at the 2014 Commonwealth Games and on his international debut, he cleared 8.08 m (26 ft 6 in) in the long jump final to earn the bronze medal.

== Personal life ==
Samaai married long-term girlfriend Alecha Thops on the 3rd of October 2021.

== Personal bests ==
- Long jump – 8.49 m (27 ft 10 1/4 in) (2017)
- Triple jump – 16.10 m (52 ft 9 3/4 in) (2014)

== International competition record ==
Year	Competition	Venue	Position	Event	Notes
2014	Commonwealth Games	Glasgow, United Kingdom	3rd	Long jump	8.08 m
2014	African Championships	Marrakesh, Morocco	3rd	Long jump	7.84 m (w)
2015	World Championships	Beijing, China	20th (q)	Long jump	7.79 m
2016	World Indoor Championships	Portland, United States	5th	Long jump	8.18 m
2016	African Championships	Durban, South Africa	1st	Long jump	8.40 m (w)
2016	Olympic Games	Rio de Janeiro, Brazil	9th	Long jump	7.97 m
2017	World Championships	London, United Kingdom	3rd	Long jump	8.32 m
2018	World Indoor Championships	Birmingham, United Kingdom	6th	Long jump	8.05 m
2018	Commonwealth Games	Gold Coast, Australia	3rd	Long jump	8.22 m
2018	African Championships	Asaba, Nigeria	1st	Long jump	8.45 m
2018	IAAF Continental Cup	Ostrava, Czech Republic	1st	Long jump	8.16 m
2019	World Championships	Doha, Qatar	5th	Long jump	8.23 m
2021	Olympic Games	Tokyo, Japan	22nd (q)	Long jump	7.74 m
2022	World Championships	Eugene, United States	15th (q)	Long jump	7.86 m
