= 2002 African Championships in Athletics – Men's long jump =

The men's long jump event at the 2002 African Championships in Athletics was held in Radès, Tunisia on August 7.

== Results ==
Rank	Name	Nationality	Result	Notes
1st place, gold medalist(s)	Younès Moudrik	Morocco	8.06w	
2nd place, silver medalist(s)	Hatem Mersal	Egypt	8.02w	
3rd place, bronze medalist(s)	Nabil Adamou	Algeria	7.98w	
4	Issam Nima	Algeria	7.93w	
5	Ndiss Kaba Badji	Senegal	7.90w	
6	Arnaud Casquette	Mauritius	7.88w	
7	Yahya Berrabah	Morocco	7.85w	
8	Gable Garenamotse	Botswana	7.80w	
9	Anis Gallali	Tunisia	7.56w	
10	Thierry Kacou Icouane	Ivory Coast	7.01	
11	Tuan Wreh	Liberia	6.97	
12	Samir Aoun	Tunisia	6.89w	
	Mbuli Atunga	Democratic Republic of the Congo	DNS	
	Abdou Demba Lam	Senegal	DNS	
	Alia Soumah	Guinea	DNS	
