= Athletics at the 2006 Commonwealth Games – Men's long jump =

Men's long jump at the Commonwealth Games

The men's long jump event at the 2006 Commonwealth Games was held on 21–22 March.

== Medalists ==
| Gold | Silver | Bronze |
|---|---|---|
| Ignisious Gaisah; Ghana | Gable Garenamotse; Botswana | Fabrice Lapierre; Australia |

== Results ==
=== Qualification ===
Qualification: 7.90 m (Q) or at least 12 best (q) qualified for the final.

| Rank | Group | Athlete | Nationality | #1 | #2 | #3 | Result | Notes |
|---|---|---|---|---|---|---|---|---|
| 1 | A | Gable Garenamotse | Botswana | 7.62 | 8.15 | | 8.15 | Q, PB |
| 2 | B | Yaw Fosu-Amoah | South Africa | 7.52 | 7.95 | | 7.95 | Q, PB |
| 3 | A | Fabrice Lapierre | Australia | 7.59 | 7.92 | | 7.92 | Q |
| 4 | B | Ignisious Gaisah | Ghana | 7.65 | 7.91 | | 7.91 | Q |
| 5 | A | John Thornell | Australia | 7.71 | x | 7.83 | 7.83 | q |
| 6 | B | Greg Rutherford | England | x | x | 7.83w | 7.83w | q |
| 7 | B | Tim Parravicini | Australia | 7.79 | 7.81 | – | 7.81 | q |
| 8 | B | Martin McClintock | South Africa | 7.31 | 7.66 | 7.81 | 7.81 | q |
| 9 | B | Khotso Mokoena | South Africa | 7.70 | 7.75 | 7.65 | 7.75 | q |
| 10 | A | Chris Tomlinson | England | x | 7.67 | 7.60 | 7.67 | q |
| 11 | B | Osbourne Moxey | Bahamas | 7.64 | 7.38 | x | 7.64 | q |
| 12 | A | Darren Ritchie | Scotland | x | x | 7.53 | 7.53 | q |
| 13 | B | Dane Magloire | Saint Lucia | x | 7.47 | x | 7.47 | |
| 14 | A | LeJuan Simon | Trinidad and Tobago | 7.42 | x | x | 7.42 | |
| 15 | A | Keita Cline | British Virgin Islands | x | x | 7.18 | 7.18 | |
| 16 | B | Robert Martey | Ghana | x | x | 6.92 | 6.92 | |
| 17 | A | Sulayman Bah | Gambia | 6.04 | 6.30 | 6.46 | 6.46 | |
| | B | Willah Gray | Turks and Caicos Islands | x | x | x | NM | |
| | A | James Beckford | Jamaica | | | | DNS | |

=== Final ===
| Rank | Athlete | Nationality | #1 | #2 | #3 | #4 | #5 | #6 | Result | Notes |
|---|---|---|---|---|---|---|---|---|---|---|
| 1st place, gold medalist(s) | Ignisious Gaisah | Ghana | 7.97 | 8.10 | x | 8.20 | 8.08 | x | 8.20 | |
| 2nd place, silver medalist(s) | Gable Garenamotse | Botswana | 8.15 | x | x | 8.17 | x | x | 8.17 | PB |
| 3rd place, bronze medalist(s) | Fabrice Lapierre | Australia | 7.61 | 8.10 | x | x | 7.67 | x | 8.10 | |
| 4 | Khotso Mokoena | South Africa | 8.03 | 8.03 | 8.04 | 7.80 | 7.44 | 7.77 | 8.04 | |
| 5 | John Thornell | Australia | 7.78 | 7.94 | 7.80 | 7.98 | x | x | 7.98 | |
| 6 | Chris Tomlinson | England | 7.60 | 7.87 | 7.96 | 7.69 | x | 7.93 | 7.96 | SB |
| 7 | Tim Parravicini | Australia | 7.82 | 7.84 | 7.90 | 7.91 | 7.84 | 7.87 | 7.91 | |
| 8 | Greg Rutherford | England | 5.46 | 7.85 | x | – | – | – | 7.85 | |
| 9 | Martin McClintock | South Africa | 7.70 | 7.82 | 7.81 | | | | 7.82 | |
| 10 | Yaw Fosu-Amoah | South Africa | 7.71 | 6.73 | – | | | | 7.71 | |
| 11 | Darren Ritchie | Scotland | 7.54 | 7.43 | x | | | | 7.54 | |
| 12 | Osbourne Moxey | Bahamas | x | 7.30 | 7.36 | | | | 7.36 | |
