= 2008 IAAF World Indoor Championships – Men's long jump =

== Medalists ==
Gold
Godfrey Khotso Mokoena	South Africa
Silver
Christopher Tomlinson	United Kingdom
Bronze
Mohamed Salman Al Khuwalidi	Saudi Arabia

== Qualification ==
Qualification rule: qualification standard 7.95m or at least best 8 qualified

Pos	Athlete	Country	Mark	Q	Attempts		
Pos	Athlete	Country	Mark	Q	1	2	3
1	Godfrey Khotso Mokoena	South Africa	8.01 SB	Q	7.81	7.52	8.01
2	Mohamed Salman Al Khuwalidi	Saudi Arabia	8.00	Q	8.00		
3	Christopher Tomlinson	United Kingdom	7.95	Q	7.95		
4	Marcin Starzak	Poland	7.92	q	X	7.92	6.13
5	James Beckford	Jamaica	7.91 SB	q	7.75	7.56	7.91
6	Wilfredo Martínez	Cuba	7.82	q	7.48	7.82	7.76
7	Gable Garenamotse	Botswana	7.82 SB	q	7.66	7.82	7.74
8	Nikolay Atanasov	Bulgaria	7.82	q	7.73	7.82	X
9	Salim Sdiri	France	7.78		7.74	5.72	7.78
10	Louis Tsatoumas	Greece	7.77		7.64	7.77	7.73
11	Rogério Bispo	Brazil	7.77		7.41	7.77	7.35
12	Hussein Taher Al-Sabee	Saudi Arabia	7.74 SB		7.61	7.59	7.74
13	Trevell Quinley	United States	7.60		7.53	7.37	7.60
14	Peter Rapp	Germany	7.59		7.50	7.59	7.49
15	Saleh Abdelaziz Al-Haddad	Kuwait	7.52		X	7.52	7.51
16	Issam Nima	Algeria	7.45 SB		7.34	7.45	7.33
17	Li Runrun	China	7.43 SB		7.30	7.43	X
18	Tyrone Smith	Bermuda	7.38		X	X	7.38
19	Arnaud Casquette	Mauritius	7.36 SB		X	7.31	7.36
20	John Moffitt	United States	7.17		7.17	X	7.09

== Final ==
Pos	Athlete	Country	Mark	Attempts					
Pos	Athlete	Country	Mark	1	2	3	4	5	6
Gold medal	Godfrey Khotso Mokoena	South Africa	8.08 SB	8.05	8.01	8.03	8.03	8.08	X
Silver medal	Christopher Tomlinson	United Kingdom	8.06	8.06	8.04	8.01	X	7.90	7.95
Bronze medal	Mohamed Salman Al Khuwalidi	Saudi Arabia	8.01	7.79	7.23	X	8.01	X	7.96
4	Gable Garenamotse	Botswana	7.93 SB	7.85	7.93	7.85	7.66	7.63	X
5	Nikolay Atanasov	Bulgaria	7.90	X	7.72	7.85	X	7.90	X
6	James Beckford	Jamaica	7.85	7.81	X	7.81	X	7.78	7.85
7	Marcin Starzak	Poland	7.74	7.72	X	X	7.69	7.74	7.57
8	Wilfredo Martínez	Cuba	7.72	X	X	7.72	7.71	X	X
