= 2012 African Championships in Athletics – Men's long jump =

The men's long jump at the 2012 African Championships in Athletics was held at the Stade Charles de Gaulle on 27 and 28 June.

== Medalists ==
Gold	Ndiss Kaba Badji; Senegal
Silver	Zarck Visser; South Africa
Bronze	Ignisious Gaisah; Ghana

== Records ==
Standing records prior to the 2012 African Championships in Athletics
World record	Mike Powell (USA)	8.95	Tokyo, Japan	30 August 1991
African record	Godfrey Khotso Mokoena (RSA)	8.50	Madrid, Spain	4 July 2009
Championship record	Younès Moudrik (MAR)	8.34	Algiers, Algeria	13 July 2000

== Schedule ==
Date	Time	Round
27 June 2012	15:00	Qualification
28 June 2012	16:10	Final

== Results ==
=== Qualification ===
Qualifying perf. 7.60 (Q) or 12 best performers (q) advanced to the Final.

Rank	Group	Athlete	Nationality	#1	#2	#3	Result	Notes
1	B	Ignisious Gaisah	Ghana	7.96w	x	x	7.96w	Q
2	A	Ndiss Kaba Badji	Senegal	7.87			7.87	Q
3	A	Stanley Gbagbeke	Nigeria	7.29	7.26	7.60	7.60	Q
4	A	Robert Martey	South Africa	7.55	7.45	7.56	7.56	q
5	B	Alaeddine Benhssine	Tunisia	7.55w	7.23	x	7.55w	q
6	B	Clive Chafausipo	Zimbabwe	7.33w	7.53w	6.06	7.53w	q
7	A	Mamadou Chérif Dia	Mali	7.40	7.50	7.31	7.50	q
8	B	Zarck Visser	South Africa	7.47	7.16	x	7.47	q
8	B	Fathallah Deifullah	Egypt	7.47w	x	7.16	7.47w	q
10	B	Elijah Kimitei	Kenya	7.18w	7.33	7.21	7.33	q
11	A	Lingo Obanga	Ethiopia	7.02	7.31w	x	7.31w	q
12	B	Ben Bande	Burkina Faso	7.16w	6.91	6.61	7.16w	q
13	A	Abdelhakim Mlaab	Morocco	x	7.01w	6.86	7.01w	
14	B	Sewa Sourou	Benin	6.98w	6.82	5.93	6.98w	
15	A	Roland Djossou	Benin	6.96w	x	–	6.96w	
16	B	Jacouba Mamane	Niger	6.91w	6.86	x	6.91w	
17	A	Jean Kanyangara	Rwanda	6.38w	6.39w	6.15w	6.39w	
18	A	Jon Duschele	Zimbabwe	x	5.75	4.88	5.75	
	A	Abrahams Nikiema	Burkina Faso				DNS	
	A	Herman Sita Kihoue	Republic of the Congo				DNS	

=== Final ===
Rank	Athlete	Nationality	#1	#2	#3	#5	#5	#6	Result	Notes
1st place, gold medalist(s)	Ndiss Kaba Badji	Senegal	7.95	7.89	8.04	7.73	7.82	x	8.04	
2nd place, silver medalist(s)	Zarck Visser	South Africa	7.87	7.98	7.77	7.62	7.80	7.80	7.98	
3rd place, bronze medalist(s)	Ignisious Gaisah	Ghana	7.61	7.72	x	7.73	7.61	7.68	7.73	
4	Clive Chafausipo	Zimbabwe	7.28	7.42	7.61	7.40	7.41	7.68	7.68	
5	Stanley Gbagbeke	Nigeria	7.60	7.41	x	7.65	7.46	7.36	7.65	
6	Elijah Kimitei	Kenya	7.42	7.13	7.47	7.35	7.47	7.31	7.47	
7	Robert Martey	South Africa	7.05	7.37	7.39	x	7.23	7.25	7.39	
8	Mamadou Chérif Dia	Mali	7.23	x	7.35	x	x	7.23	7.35	
9	Alaeddine Benhssine	Tunisia	7.13	7.31	7.21				7.31	
10	Lingo Obanga	Ethiopia	x	7.26	x				7.26	
11	Fathallah Deifullah	Egypt	7.21	3.97	–				7.21	
12	Ben Bande	Burkina Faso	6.88	6.64	6.84				6.88	
