= 2006 African Championships in Athletics – Men's long jump =

The men's long jump event at the 2006 African Championships in Athletics was held at the Stade Germain Comarmond on August 9.

== Results ==
Rank	Name	Nationality	#1	#2	#3	#4	#5	#6	Result	Notes
1st place, gold medalist(s)	Ignatius Gaisah	Ghana	8.24w	8.19	8.41w	8.34w	–	8.51w	8.51w	
2nd place, silver medalist(s)	Godfrey Khotso Mokoena	South Africa	x	8.09	8.18w	8.15w	8.10	8.45w	8.45w	
3rd place, bronze medalist(s)	Issam Nima	Algeria	x	8.04w	8.37w	x	x	8.22w	8.37w	
4	Gable Garenamotse	Botswana	7.94	7.79	x	x	8.00	8.02w	8.02w	
5	Arnaud Casquette	Mauritius	7.43	7.74w	7.74	x	x	7.71	7.74w	
6	Cadeau Kelley	Liberia	7.73w	7.67w	x	7.35w	7.58w	x	7.73w	
7	Younès Moudrik	Morocco	7.64w	7.59	7.51	x	x	–	7.64w	
8	Yahya Berrabah	Morocco	7.64w	7.43	7.55w	x	x	x	7.64w	
9	Yaw Fosu-Amoah	South Africa	x	7.53	7.49				7.53	
10	Hatem Mersal	Egypt	6.93	7.34	7.51w				7.51w	
11	Tunde Suleiman	Nigeria	7.02	7.30	7.39w				7.39w	
12	Stephan Louw	Namibia	7.27	x	7.37w				7.37w	
13	Tarik Bouguetaïb	Morocco	x	x	7.37w				7.37w	
14	Pegguy Sita Kihoue	Republic of the Congo	7.25w	7.17	7.23w				7.25w	
15	Mamadou Chérif Dia	Mali	6.74	6.98w	7.09w				7.09w	
16	Richard Chitambi	Zambia	6.90w	6.14	6.41w				6.90w	
