= Athletics at the 2015 African Games – Men's long jump =

The men's long jump event at the 2015 African Games was held on 17 September.

== Results ==
Rank	Name	Nationality	#1	#2	#3	#4	#5	#6	Result	Notes
~~1~~	Samson Idiata	Nigeria	~~7.83~~	~~7.60~~	~~x~~	~~x~~	~~x~~	~~x~~	~~7.83~~	DQ (doping)
1st place, gold medalist(s)	Ndiss Kaba Badji	Senegal	x	7.65	x	7.62	x	7.74	7.74	
2nd place, silver medalist(s)	Mamadou Gueye	Senegal	7.62	x	x	x	7.69	x	7.69	
3rd place, bronze medalist(s)	Romeo N'tia	Benin	7.44	x	x	7.35	7.39	x	7.44	
4	Mamadou Chérif Dia	Mali	x	7.30	x	7.24	x	7.43	7.43	
5	Kiplagat Ruto	Kenya	7.26	7.37	7.41	x	x	7.31	7.41	
6	Ezekiel Ewulo	Nigeria	x	7.16	7.23	x	x	7.39	7.39	
7	Tera Langat	Kenya	7.28	7.14	7.03	x	x	7.24	7.28	
8	Armand Tsoaoule	Cameroon	7.09	x	7.06				7.09	
9	Armand Bimiakounou	Republic of the Congo	7.07	7.05	7.07				7.07	
10	Tesfaye Nedesa	Ethiopia	6.92	6.86	6.78				6.92	
