= Athletics at the 2003 Afro-Asian Games =

The athletics events at the 2003 Afro-Asian Games were held from 28–30 October 2003, at the GMC Balayogi Athletic Stadium. A total of 42 events were contested at the inaugural edition of the Games.

== Medal summary ==
=== Men ===
Event	Gold		Silver		Bronze	
100 metres	Olusoji Fasuba (NGR)	10.15 s	Tamunosiki Atorudibo (NGR)	10.20 s	Shingo Suetsugu (JPN)	10.36 s
200 metres	Frank Fredericks (NAM)	20.57 s	Gennadiy Chernovol (KAZ)	20.81 s	Oumar Loum (SEN)	20.99 s
400 metres	Ezra Sambu (KEN)	45.04 s	Nagmeldin Ali Abubakr (SUD)	45.44 s	Sugath Tillakaratne (SRI)	45.99 s
800 metres	Ismail Ahmed Ismail (SUD)	1:46.92 min	Peter Roko Ashak (SUD)	1:47.48 min	Samwel Mwera (TAN)	1:47.98 min
1500 metres	Abdalla Abdelgadir (SUD)	3:40.17 min	Peter Roko Ashak (SUD)	3:40.21 min	Benjamin Chediinya (KEN)	3:40.65 min
5000 metres	Hailu Mekonnen (ETH)	13:49.08 min	Markos Geneti (ETH)	13:49.61 min	Dennis Keter (KEN)	13:50.41 min
10,000 metres	Sileshi Sihine (ETH)	27:48.40 min	Gebregziabher Gebremariam (ETH)	28:08.79 min	Boniface Toroitich Kiprop (UGA)	28:12.67 min
110 metre hurdles	Todd Matthews-Jouda (SUD)	13.68 s	Masato Naito (JPN)	13.71 s	Park Tae-Kyong (KOR)	13.83 s
400 metre hurdles	Yevgeniy Meleshenko (KAZ)	49.66 s	Ibou Faye (SEN)	50.08 s	Osita Okagu (NGR)	50.87 s
3000 metre steeplechase	John Kemboi Kibowen (KEN)	8:56.43 min	Arun D'Souza (IND)	9:05.97 min	Joel Kiptanui Chelimo (KEN)	9:24.08 min
4×100 metre relay	Africa	39.07 s	Senegal (SEN)	39.58 s	India (IND)	39.64 s
4×400 metre relay	Africa	3:04.61 min	Nigeria (NGR)	3:05.09 min	Zimbabwe (ZIM)	3:05.35 min
10 km walk	Moussa Aouanouk (ALG)	43:33.58 min	Sitaram Basat (IND)	45:09.40 min	Sakchai Samutkao (THA)	45:54.04 min
High jump	Cui Kai (CHN)	2.18 m	Samson Idiata (NGR)	2.15 m	Jude Sidonie (SYC)	2.10 m
Pole vault	Grigoriy Yegorov (KAZ)	5.25 m	Karim Sène (SEN)	5.05 m	Rafik Mefti (ALG)	4.95 m
Long jump	Nabil Adamou (ALG)	7.93 m	Ndiss Kaba Badji (SEN)	7.86 m	Godfrey Khotso Mokoena (RSA)	7.76 m
Triple jump	Takashi Komatsu (JPN)	16.65 m	Olivier Sanou (BFA)	16.16 m	Godfrey Khotso Mokoena (RSA)	15.92 m
Shot put	Shakti Singh (IND)	19.05 m	Burger Lambrechts (RSA)	18.97 m	Navpreet Singh (IND)	18.81 m
Discus throw	Anil Kumar (IND)	60.68 m	Chima Ugwu (NGR)	59.87 m	Omar Elghazaly (EGY)	59.77 m
Hammer throw	Chris Harmse (RSA)	75.67 m	Dilshod Nazarov (TJK)	69.72 m	Samir Haouam (ALG)	69.37 m
Javelin throw	Gerhardus Pienaar (RSA)	84.50 m PB	Li Rongxiang (CHN)	79.01 m	Jagdish Bishnoi (IND)	75.34 m

=== Women ===
Event	Gold		Silver		Bronze	
100 metres	Endurance Ojokolo (NGR)	11.45 s	Lyubov Perepelova (UZB)	11.49 s	Delphine Atangana (CMR)	11.49 s
200 metres	Delphine Atangana (CMR)	23.37 s	Saraswati Saha (IND)	23.43 s	Geraldine Pillay (RSA)	23.48 s
400 metres	Estie Wittstock (RSA)	52.09 s	Doris Jacob (NGR)	53.08 s	Wassana Winatho (THA)	53.88 s
800 metres	Lwiza John (TAN)	2:01.68 min	Wang Yuanping (CHN)	2:04.36 min	Berhane Herpassa (ETH)	2:05.31 min
1500 metres	Berhane Herpassa (ETH)	4:17.36 min	Kutre Dulecha (ETH)	4:18.14 min	Madhuri Singh (IND)	4:22.32 min
5000 metres	Meseret Defar (ETH)	15:47.69 min	Tirunesh Dibaba (ETH)	15:48.21 min	Dorcus Inzikuru (UGA)	16:33.71 min
10,000 metres	Ejegayehu Dibaba (ETH)	33:01.12 min	Eyerusalem Kuma (ETH)	33:20.19 min	Sujeewa Jayasena (SRI)	35:53.45 min
100 metre hurdles	Angela Atede (NGR)	13.18 s	Feng Yun (CHN)	13.20 s	Damaris Agbugba (NGR)	13.21 s
400 metre hurdles	Natalya Torshina (KAZ)	55.81 s	Yao Yuehua (CHN)	56.29 s	Wassana Winatho (THA)	57.09 s
4×100 metre relay	South Africa (RSA)	43.75 s	Ivory Coast (CIV)	43.75 s	Thailand (THA)	43.90 s
4×400 metre relay	Nigeria (NGR)	3:29.75 min	Africa	3:32.16 min	Kazakhstan (KAZ)	3:32.41 min
10 km walk	Bahia Boussad (ALG)	51:23.70 min	Jasmin Kaur (IND)	51:36.60 min	Estle Viljoen (RSA)	52:01.30 min
High jump	Marina Aitova (KAZ)	1.88 m	Bobby Aloysius (IND)	1.88 m	Marizca Gertenbach (RSA)	1.75 m
Pole vault	Zhang Na (CHN)	4.10 m	Annelie van Wyk (RSA)	4.00 m	Qin Xia (CHN)	3.90 m
Long jump	Anju Bobby George (IND)	6.53 m	Lerma Gabito (PHL)	6.30 m	Esther Aghatise (NGR)	6.30 m
Triple jump	Huang Qiuyan (CHN)	13.50 m	Tatyana Bocharova (KAZ)	13.34 m	Salamatu Alimi (NGR)	13.00 m
Shot put	Li Meiju (CHN)	17.61 m	Li Fengfeng (CHN)	17.21 m	Juthaporn Krasaeyan (THA)	16.63 m
Discus throw	Neelam Jaswant Singh (IND)	61.93 m	Li Yanfeng (CHN)	60.42 m	Song Aimin (CHN)	58.41 m
Hammer throw	Liu Yinghui (CHN)	68.03 m	Zhao Wei (CHN)	65.22 m	Marwa Hussein (EGY)	60.60 m
Javelin throw	Sunette Viljoen (RSA)	55.49 m	Gurmeet Kaur (IND)	53.37 m	Ha Xiaoyan (CHN)	51.96 m
Heptathlon	J. J. Shobha (IND)	5884 pts	Justine Robbeson (RSA)	5587 pts	Soma Biswas (IND)	5532 pts

=== Medal table ===
* Host nation (India)

Rank	Nation	Gold	Silver	Bronze	Total
1	China (CHN)	5	7	3	15
2	India (IND)*	5	6	5	16
3	Ethiopia (ETH)	5	5	1	11
4	South Africa (SAF)	5	3	5	13
5	Nigeria (NGR)	4	4	4	12
6	Kazakhstan (KAZ)	4	2	1	7
7	Sudan (SUD)	3	3	0	6
8	Algeria (ALG)	3	2	0	5
9	African team	2	1	0	3
10	Kenya (KEN)	2	0	3	5
11	Japan (JPN)	1	1	1	3
12	Cameroon (CMR)	1	0	1	2
12	Tanzania (TAN)	1	0	1	2
14	Namibia (NAM)	1	0	0	1
15	Senegal (SEN)	0	4	1	5
16	Burkina Faso (BUR)	0	1	0	1
16	Ivory Coast (CIV)	0	1	0	1
16	Philippines (PHI)	0	1	0	1
16	Uzbekistan (UZB)	0	1	0	1
20	Thailand (THA)	0	0	5	5
21	Sri Lanka (SRI)	0	0	3	3
22	Egypt (EGY)	0	0	2	2
22	Uganda (UGA)	0	0	2	2
24	Seychelles (SEY)	0	0	1	1
24	South Korea (KOR)	0	0	1	1
24	Tajikistan (TJK)	0	0	1	1
24	Zimbabwe (ZIM)	0	0	1	1
Totals (27 entries)		42	42	42	126
