= 2016 African Championships in Athletics – Men's long jump =

The men's long jump event at the 2016 African Championships in Athletics was held on 23 June in Kings Park Stadium.

== Results ==
| Rank | Athlete | Nationality | Result | Notes |
|---|---|---|---|---|
| 1st place, gold medalist(s) | Ruswahl Samaai | South Africa | 8.40w | |
| 2nd place, silver medalist(s) | Luvo Manyonga | South Africa | 8.23w | |
| 3rd place, bronze medalist(s) | Ruri Rammkolodi | Botswana | 7.90w | |
| 4 | Mamadou Gueye | Senegal | 7.78w | |
| 5 | Terra Lagat | Kenya | 7.63w | |
| 6 | Goabaone Mosheleketi | Botswana | 7.59w | |
| 7 | Romeo N'tia | Benin | 7.45w | |
| 8 | Mouhcine Lakhou | Morocco | 7.40w | |
| 9 | Djafar Swedi | Democratic Republic of the Congo | 6.10w | |
| | Joseph Sinkala | Zambia | NM | |
| | Dylon Cotter | South Africa | NM | |
| | Mamadou Chérif Dia | Mali | DNS | |
| | Amr Kaseb | Egypt | DNS | |
| | Andrew Issaka | Republic of the Congo | DNS | |
