= Mamadou Gueye (jumper) =

Senegalese athlete (born 1986)

Personal information
- Born: 15 March 1986 (age 40)
- Height: 1.78 m (5.8 ft)
- Weight: 71 kg (157 lb)

Sport
- Sport: Track and field
- Event(s): Long jump, triple jump
- College team: Monroe College
Medal record
Men's Athletics
Representing Senegal
African Games
Silver medal – second place	2015 Brazzaville	Long jump

Mamadou Gueye (born 15 March 1986) is a Senegalese athlete competing in the long jump and triple jump. He won the bronze medal at the 2015 African Games.

== Competition record ==
Year	Competition	Venue	Position	Event	Notes
Representing Senegal
2009	Universiade	Belgrade, Serbia	23rd (q)	Long jump	7.20 m
2009	Universiade	Belgrade, Serbia	18th (q)	Triple jump	15.72 m
2010	African Championships	Nairobi, Kenya	5th	Triple jump	16.24 m
2011	Universiade	Shenzhen, China	–	Long jump	NM
2011	Universiade	Shenzhen, China	19th (q)	Triple jump	15.51 m
2011	All-Africa Games	Maputo, Mozambique	6th	Triple jump	15.81 m
2013	Universiade	Kazan, Russia	12th	Long jump	7.43 m
2013	Universiade	Kazan, Russia	10th	Triple jump	15.53 m
2013	Jeux de la Francophonie	Nice, France	6th	Long jump	7.61 m
2013	Jeux de la Francophonie	Nice, France	9th	Triple jump	16.03 m
2014	African Championships	Marrakesh, Morocco	5th (h)	4x100 m relay	40.95 s
2014	African Championships	Marrakesh, Morocco	7th	Triple jump	16.11 m
2015	African Games	Brazzaville, Republic of the Congo	2nd	Long jump	7.69 m
2016	African Championships	Durban, South Africa	4th	Long jump	7.78 m (w)
2016	African Championships	Durban, South Africa	10th	Triple jump	15.86 m (w)
2017	Jeux de la Francophonie	Abidjan, Ivory Coast	2nd	Long jump	7.86 m (w)

== Personal bests ==
Outdoor

- Long jump – 7.86 (Saint-Louis, SEN 2015)
- Triple jump – 16.50 (Saint-Louis, SEN 2015)

Indoor

- 60 metres – 7.19
- 200 metres – 23.34
- Long jump – 7.83 (New York 2013)
- Triple jump – 16.17 (New York 2013)
