= 2004 African Championships in Athletics – Men's long jump =

The men's long jump event at the 2004 African Championships in Athletics was held in Brazzaville, Republic of the Congo on July 15.

== Results ==
Rank	Name	Nationality	Result	Notes
1st place, gold medalist(s)	Jonathan Chimier	Mauritius	8.06	
2nd place, silver medalist(s)	Ndiss Kaba Badji	Senegal	7.86	
3rd place, bronze medalist(s)	Nabil Adamou	Algeria	7.72	
4	Hatem Mersal	Egypt	7.68	
5	Arnaud Casquette	Mauritius	7.65	
6	Tarik Bouguetaïb	Morocco	7.62	
7	Robert Martey	Ghana	7.24	
8	Kihoue Sita	Republic of the Congo	7.05	
9	Hugo Mamba-Schlick	Cameroon	6.73	
10	Christopher Sayeh	Liberia	5.87	
