= Keenan Watson =

South African long jumper

Keenan Watson (born 3 March 1988) is a retired South African long jumper.

He finished sixth at the 2006 World Junior Championships, won the gold medal at the 2007 African Junior Championships, finished eighth at the 2007 All-Africa Games and ninth at the 2008 African Championships. He also competed at the 2009 Summer Universiade without reaching the final.

His personal best jump is 8.11 metres, achieved in March 2008 in Stellenbosch.
