= Gable Garenamotse =

Motswana athletics competitor

Personal information
- Nationality: Motswana
- Born: 28 February 1977 (age 49) Gumare, North-West, Botswana
- Height: 183 cm (6 ft 0 in)
- Weight: 75 kg (165 lb)

Sport
- Sport: Athletics
- Event: Long jump
- Club: Cardiff AAC
Medal record
Representing Botswana
Commonwealth Games
Silver medal – second place	2002 Manchester	Long jump
Silver medal – second place	2006 Melbourne	Long jump
Summer Universiade
Bronze medal – third place	2001 Beijing	Long jump

Gable Garenamotse (born 28 February 1977) is a Motswana former long jumper, who has won two silver medals at the Commonwealth Games and competed at two Olympic Games in 2004 and 2008.

== Biography ==
In 1999 Garenamotse won the triple jump at the African Southern Region Championships, and participated in both long jump and triple jump at the World Championships. Having peaked at a 16.66 metres jump that year, a national record, he decided to concentrate on long jump from thereon. His first international medal was a bronze at the 21st Universiade in 2001.

At the 2002 Commonwealth Games in Manchester Garenamotse placed second. He competed at the 2004 Summer Olympics, without reaching the final. He repeated the second place four years later at the 2006 Commonwealth Games, setting a national record of 8.17 metres. In August the same year he improved to 8.27 metres. He won the gold medal at the 2007 All-Africa Games.

Gable Garenamotse did not reach the final at the 2007 World Championships, but finished fourth at the 2008 World Indoor Championships, seventh at the 2008 African Championships and ninth at the 2008 Olympic Games.

== Competition record ==
Year	Competition	Venue	Position	Event	Notes
Representing Botswana
1996	World Junior Championships	Sydney, Australia	30th (q)	Long jump	6.92 m (wind: -0.4 m/s)
1996	World Junior Championships	Sydney, Australia	14th (q)	Triple jump	15.32 m
1998	Commonwealth Games	Kuala Lumpur, Malaysia	6th	Triple jump	16.05 m
1999	World Championships	Seville, Spain	42nd (q)	Long jump	7.28 m
1999	World Championships	Seville, Spain	38th (q)	Triple jump	15.53 m
1999	All-Africa Games	Johannesburg, South Africa	11th	Long jump	7.19 m
1999	All-Africa Games	Johannesburg, South Africa	6th	Triple jump	15.70 m
2001	Universiade	Beijing, China	3rd	Long jump	7.99 m
2002	Commonwealth Games	Manchester, United Kingdom	2nd	Long jump	7.91 m
2002	African Championships	Radès, Tunisia	8th	Long jump	7.80 m (w)
2003	World Championships	Paris, France	29th (q)	Long jump	7.57 m
2003	All-Africa Games	Abuja, Nigeria	5th	Long jump	7.82 m
2004	World Indoor Championships	Budapest, Hungary	18th (q)	Long jump	7.68 m
2004	Olympic Games	Athens, Greece	25th (q)	Long jump	7.78 m
2006	Commonwealth Games	Melbourne, Australia	2nd	Long jump	8.17 m
2006	African Championships	Bambous, Mauritius	6th	4 × 100 m relay	41.20
2006	African Championships	Bambous, Mauritius	4th	Long jump	8.02 m
2007	All-Africa Games	Algiers, Algeria	1st	Long jump	8.08 m
2007	World Championships	Osaka, Japan	20th (q)	Long jump	7.77 m
2008	World Indoor Championships	Valencia, Spain	4th	Long jump	7.93 m
2008	African Championships	Addis Ababa, Ethiopia	7th	Long jump	7.84 m
2008	Olympic Games	Beijing, China	9th	Long jump	7.85 m
2009	World Championships	Berlin, Germany	7th	Long jump	8.06 m
2010	World Indoor Championships	Doha, Qatar	15th (q)	Long jump	7.73 m
