= Athletics at the 2011 Summer Universiade – Men's long jump =

The men's long jump event at the 2011 Summer Universiade was held on 20–21 August.

== Medalists ==
Gold	Silver	Bronze
Su Xiongfeng; China	Marquise Goodwin; United States	Julian Reid; Great Britain

== Results ==
=== Qualification ===
Qualification: 7.85 m (Q) or at least 12 best (q) qualified for the final.

Rank	Group	Athlete	Nationality	#1	#2	#3	Result	Notes
1	A	Marquise Goodwin	United States	7.74	7.72	8.00	8.00	Q
2	B	Su Xiongfeng	China	7.91			7.91	Q
3	B	Supanara Sukhasvasti	Thailand	x	7.90		7.90	Q
4	A	Zarck Visser	South Africa	x	7.85		7.85	Q, =PB
5	A	Julian Reid	Great Britain	x	7.82		7.82	q
6	A	Sergey Mikhailovskiy	Russia	7.76	7.54	7.51	7.76	q
7	B	Stanley Gbagbeke	Nigeria	7.75	x	x	7.75	q
8	B	Jorge McFarlane	Peru	7.15	7.74	7.73	7.74	q
9	A	Yun Zhiming	China	7.73	x	7.62	7.73	q
10	B	Pavel Karavayev	Russia	7.73	x	–	7.73	q
11	B	Darius Aučyna	Lithuania	x	7.49	7.66	7.66	q
12	A	Daniel Pineda	Chile	7.50	7.63	7.52	7.63	q
13	A	Benoît Maxwell	France	5.66	7.60	x	7.60	
14	A	Juho-Matti Pimiä	Finland	7.59	x	7.44	7.59	
15	B	Hugo Chila	Ecuador	7.57	7.49	7.53	7.57	
16	A	Dino Pervan	Croatia	7.56	x	7.56	7.56	
17	B	Alyn Camara	Germany	7.54	7.48	7.37	7.54	
18	A	Povilas Mykolaitis	Lithuania	x	7.53	x	7.53	
18	B	Bence Bánhidi	Hungary	x	x	7.53	7.53	
20	A	Elvijs Misāns	Latvia	x	x	7.49	7.49	
21	A	Reda Megdoud	Algeria	7.37	x	7.46	7.46	
22	B	Leon Hunt	United States Virgin Islands	6.91	7.46	x	7.46	
23	B	Zacharias Arnos	Cyprus	7.45	x	7.30	7.45	
24	B	Rafael Mello	Brazil	7.37	x	x	7.37	
25	B	Kim Donghan	South Korea	7.08	7.34	7.16	7.34	
26	A	Lin Chinghsuan	Chinese Taipei	x	7.14	7.29	7.29	
27	B	Nino Espinosa	Philippines	6.96	7.24	7.01	7.24	
28	A	Luis Rivera	Mexico	7.08	x	7.23	7.23	
29	B	Chan Guo Jen	Malaysia	x	7.23	7.00	7.23	
30	A	Konrad Podgórski	Poland	x	x	7.22	7.22	
30	B	Jonathan Pengel	Netherlands	x	7.22	x	7.22	
32	B	Nabeel Abdillah Almatz	Saudi Arabia	x	7.19	6.75	7.19	
33	B	Hillary Biwot	Kenya	6.61	7.04	6.87	7.04	
34	A	Emmanuel Aggrey	Ghana	x	x	6.99	6.99	
35	B	Thalosang Tshireletso	Botswana	6.90	6.50	5.45	6.90	
36	A	Javier McFarlane	Peru	x	6.89	x	6.89	
37	A	Jason Castro	Honduras	6.18	6.82	x	6.82	
38	A	Rei Toska	Albania	6.74	6.70	x	6.74	
39	B	Hemza Chouikh	Algeria	x	x	6.61	6.61	
40	B	Kebby Malumbe	Zambia	6.30	6.56	6.09	6.56	
41	B	Pule Tantseli	Lesotho	6.53	x	x	6.53	NR
42	A	Iao Taklei	Macau	x	6.51	x	6.51	
43	B	Aude Ndamba Dianana	Republic of the Congo	x	6.14	6.45	6.45	
44	A	Peder Nielsen	Denmark	x	6.25	4.83	6.25	
	A	Marcos Caldeira	Portugal	x	x	x	NM	
	A	Mamadou Gueye	Senegal	x	x	x	NM	
	B	Gregor Areseb	Namibia	x	x	x	NM	
	B	Jānis Leitis	Latvia	x	x	x	NM	
	B	Konstantin Safronov	Kazakhstan	x	x	–	NM	
	A	Dmitrii Ilin	Kyrgyzstan				DNS	
	A	Lee Jaeha	South Korea				DNS	
	A	Hilton Silva	Brazil				DNS	

=== Final ===
Rank	Athlete	Nationality	#1	#2	#3	#4	#5	#6	Result	Notes
1st place, gold medalist(s)	Su Xiongfeng	China	x	8.05	8.03	7.83	x	8.17	8.17	
2nd place, silver medalist(s)	Marquise Goodwin	United States	7.97	x	x	8.00	8.03	8.01	8.03	
3rd place, bronze medalist(s)	Julian Reid	Great Britain	7.84	x	7.79	7.82	x	7.96	7.96	
4	Stanley Gbagbeke	Nigeria	7.75	x	7.96	x	–	x	7.96	
5	Pavel Karavayev	Russia	7.72	7.83	7.93	7.80	x	7.84	7.93	
6	Supanara Sukhasvasti	Thailand	7.74	x	7.89	7.84	x	x	7.89	
7	Zarck Visser	South Africa	7.70	7.81	7.72	7.57	7.28	7.48	7.81	
8	Darius Aučyna	Lithuania	7.76	x	7.60	7.40	7.68	x	7.76	
9	Yun Zhiming	China	7.70	x	7.74				7.74	
10	Sergey Mikhailovskiy	Russia	7.69	7.40	x				7.69	
11	Jorge McFarlane	Peru	7.68	7.66	x				7.68	
12	Daniel Pineda	Chile	x	7.59	7.56				7.59	
