= Athletics at the 2009 Summer Universiade – Men's long jump =

The men's long jump event at the 2009 Summer Universiade was held on 11–12 July.

== Medalists ==
Gold	Silver	Bronze
Kim Deok-Hyeon; South Korea	Ndiss Kaba Badji; Senegal	Marcin Starzak; Poland

== Results ==
=== Qualification ===
Qualification: 7.85 m (Q) or at least 12 best (q) qualified for the final.

Rank	Group	Athlete	Nationality	#1	#2	#3	Result	Notes
1	A	Su Xiongfeng	China	7.98			7.98	Q, SB
2	A	Marcin Starzak	Poland	7.83	x	–	7.83	q
3	A	Kim Deok-Hyeon	South Korea	x	7.50	7.82	7.82	q
4	B	Štěpán Wagner	Czech Republic	x	7.73	7.81	7.81	q
5	B	Ndiss Kaba Badji	Senegal	7.44	7.78	7.74	7.78	q
6	B	Yasuyuki Horiike	Japan	7.40	7.04	7.66	7.66	q
7	A	Sergey Polyanskiy	Russia	6.76	7.19	7.61	7.61	q, SB
8	B	Dimitrios Diamantaras	Greece	7.57	7.28	x	7.57	q
9	A	Shaun Fletcher	Australia	x	7.39	7.56	7.56	q
10	A	Stefano Tremigliozzi	Italy	x	7.50	7.55	7.55	q
11	B	Theerayut Philakong	Thailand	6.88	x	7.53	7.53	q
12	A	Savvas Diakonikolas	Greece	7.22	7.47	7.40	7.47	q
13	B	Adrian Vasile	Romania	7.42	x	7.37	7.42	
14	A	Mantas Dilys	Lithuania	7.23	7.42	7.22	7.42	
15	B	Povilas Mykolaitis	Lithuania	7.39	7.40	7.39	7.40	
16	B	Keenan Watson	South Africa	7.34	x	7.39	7.39	
17	B	Viktor Sirotkin	Russia	7.33	7.32	6.74	7.33	
18	B	John Thornell	Australia	x	7.33	x	7.33	
19	A	Marko Prugovečki	Croatia	6.99	7.13	7.30	7.30	
20	A	Milan Milenković	Serbia	7.11	7.03	7.30	7.30	
21	B	Kim Seong-Ho	South Korea	7.23	x	7.23	7.23	
22	A	Tsai I-Ta	Chinese Taipei	6.92	7.23	7.17	7.23	
23	A	Mamadou Gueye	Senegal	7.00	7.20	7.05	7.20	
24	A	Yaw Fosu-Amoah	South Africa	7.17	x	6.99	7.17	
25	B	Han Jinru	China	7.13	7.02	x	7.13	
26	A	Gregor Areseb	Namibia	7.06	7.12	7.12	7.12	
27	A	Redha Arezki Megdoud	Algeria	6.97	7.05	7.10	7.10	
28	B	Rok Viler	Slovenia	x	x	7.08	7.08	
29	A	Toms Andersons	Latvia	7.04	6.97	x	7.04	
30	A	Ruri Rammokolodi	Botswana	7.03	x	x	7.03	
31	A	Hans Lamas	Sweden	6.69	x	6.96	6.96	
32	B	Zacharias Arnos	Cyprus	x	x	6.89	6.89	
33	A	Kwabena Amponsah Collins	Ghana	x	6.68	x	6.68	
	A	Vladimir Velin	Bulgaria				DNS	
	B	Boris Bozhinov	Bulgaria				DNS	
	B	Stanley Gbagbeke	Nigeria				DNS	
	B	Jean-Paul Masanga-Mekombo	Democratic Republic of the Congo				DNS	
	B	Jorge McFarlane	Peru				DNS	
	B	Dragoje Rajković	Montenegro				DNS	

=== Final ===
Rank	Athlete	Nationality	#1	#2	#3	#4	#5	#6	Result	Notes
1st place, gold medalist(s)	Kim Deok-Hyeon	South Korea	8.12	8.07w	8.41w	8.16	8.20	x	8.41w	
2nd place, silver medalist(s)	Ndiss Kaba Badji	Senegal	x	8.19w	8.07	8.09w	8.13	x	8.19w	
3rd place, bronze medalist(s)	Marcin Starzak	Poland	x	8.08	x	8.10	7.95	7.97w	8.10	SB
4	Su Xiongfeng	China	7.90	7.84	x	x	7.26	x	7.90	
5	Sergey Polyanskiy	Russia	7.79w	7.57	x	x	x	x	7.79w	
6	Shaun Fletcher	Australia	7.22	7.49	7.70w	6.76	7.17	7.70	7.70	
7	Savvas Diakonikolas	Greece	7.42w	7.42	7.60	7.41	7.20w	7.68w	7.68w	
8	Yasuyuki Horiike	Japan	7.50	7.38	x	7.41	–	7.53w	7.53w	
9	Stefano Tremigliozzi	Italy	7.48w	x	x				7.48w	
10	Theerayut Philakong	Thailand	x	7.37	7.38				7.38	
	Dimitrios Diamantaras	Greece	x	x	x				NM	
	Štěpán Wagner	Czech Republic	x	x	x				NM	
