= Anis Gallali =

Tunisian long jumper (born 1972)

Medal record

Men's athletics

Representing Tunisia

African Championships
Gold medal – first place	1996 Yaoundé	Long jump
Silver medal – second place	1998 Dakar	Long jump

Anis Gallali (born 15 July 1972) is a retired Tunisian long jumper.

He won the gold medal at the 1996 African Championships and the silver medal at the 1998 African Championships, the latter in 8.01 metres. This remained his lifetime best jump, and is also the Tunisian record.

He became Tunisian champion in 1993, 1995 and 2002.

== Competition record ==
Year	Competition	Venue	Position	Event	Notes
Representing Tunisia
1996	African Championships	Yaoundé, Cameroon	1st	Long jump	7.81 m
1997	Mediterranean Games	Bari, Italy	8th	Long jump	7.71 m
1998	African Championships	Dakar, Senegal	2nd	Long jump	8.01 m
2001	Mediterranean Games	Radès, Tunisia	12th	Long jump	7.39 m (w)
2002	African Championships	Radès, Tunisia	9th	Long jump	7.56 m (w)
