= 2008 African Championships in Athletics – Men's long jump =

The men's long jump event at the 2008 African Championships in Athletics was held at the Addis Ababa Stadium on May 1.

== Results ==
Rank	Athlete	Nationality	#1	#2	#3	#4	#5	#6	Result	Notes
1st place, gold medalist(s)	Yahya Berrabah	Morocco	8.04	x	7.76	x	7.81	x	8.04	
2nd place, silver medalist(s)	Jonathan Chimier	Mauritius	7.61	7.72	7.61	7.99	7.36	7.65	7.99	
3rd place, bronze medalist(s)	Stephan Louw	Namibia	x	7.46	7.98	x	7.41	x	7.98	
4	Tarik Bouguetaïb	Morocco	7.86	7.59	7.70	7.97	7.41	x	7.97	
5	Issam Nima	Algeria	7.88	7.70	7.92	7.57	7.74	7.84	7.92	
6	Hatem Mersal	Egypt	7.51	7.74	7.67	7.85	7.87	7.64	7.87	
7	Gable Garenamotse	Botswana	7.45	7.71	x	7.47	7.84	7.69	7.84	
8	Robert Martey	Ghana	x	7.71	x	x	x	7.48	7.71	
9	Keenan Watson	South Africa	x	x	7.65				7.65	
10	Yaw Fosu-amoah	South Africa	7.55w	7.63	7.39				7.63	
11	Pegguy Sita Kihoue	Republic of the Congo	7.12	6.99	6.99				7.12	
12	Shola Anota	Nigeria	6.83	x	7.06				7.06	
13	Derebew Tadesse	Ethiopia	7.01	6.79	6.48				7.01	
14	Mama Edao	Ethiopia	x	6.91	6.80				6.91	
15	Galwake Galcote	Ethiopia	6.77	x	x				6.77	
	Larona Koosimile	Botswana							DNS	
