= Ignisious Gaisah =

Ghanaian-Dutch long jumper

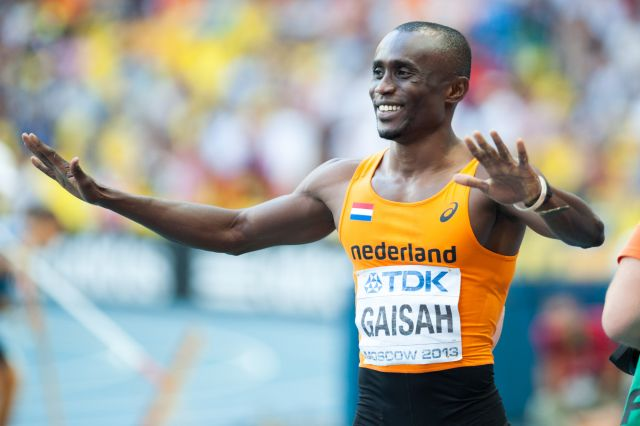
- Gaisah at the 2013 World Championships

Personal information
- Nationality: Dutch
- Born: 20 July 1983 (age 42) Kumasi, Ghana
- Height: 1.85 m (6 ft 1 in)
- Weight: 75 kg (165 lb)

Sport
- Country: Netherlands
- Sport: Track and field
- Event: Long jump
- Club: global sports communications

Achievements and titles
- Highest world ranking: Third
- Personal best: Long jump: 8.43 m NR
Medal record
Men's athletics
Representing Ghana
World Championships
Silver medal – second place	2005 Helsinki	Long jump
World Indoor Championships
Gold medal – first place	2006 Moscow	Long jump
Commonwealth Games
Gold medal – first place	2006 Melbourne	Long jump
Bronze medal – third place	2010 Delhi	Long jump
All-Africa Games
Gold medal – first place	2003 Abuja	Long jump
Silver medal – second place	2011 Maputo	Long jump
African Championships
Gold medal – first place	2006 Bambous	Long jump
Bronze medal – third place	2012 Porto-Novo	Long jump
Representing Netherlands
World Championships
Silver medal – second place	2013 Moscow	Long jump
European Championships
Bronze medal – third place	2016 Amsterdam	Long jump

Ignisious Gaisah (born 20 July 1983) is a Ghanaian-born athlete competing in the long jump for the Netherlands.

== Career ==
Gaisah moved to the Netherlands in 2001 and currently lives and trains in Rotterdam. He competes for P.A.C. Rotterdam.

In 2005 jumped a personal best 8.34 metres to win the silver medal at the World Championships in Helsinki, finishing behind Dwight Phillips. On 2 February 2006, in Stockholm he leaped to an African indoor record that also won him the gold medal in this event by jumping 8.36 metres. He continued his good form to win the 2006 IAAF World Indoor Championships a month later with a jump of 8.30 metres, followed quickly by the 2006 Commonwealth Games gold medal with a jump of 8.20 metres.

At the 2006 African Championships in Athletics Gaisah won the gold medal with an 8.51 m jump, beating Cheikh Touré's African record of 8.46 metres from 1997, but as the tail wind was too strong (+3.7 m/s) the result could not become a new record. Since July 2013 Gaisah officially competes for the Netherlands after gaining his Dutch passport.

== Competition record ==
Year	Competition	Venue	Position	Notes
Representing Ghana
2003	World Championships	Paris, France	4th	8.13 m
2003	All-Africa Games	Abuja, Nigeria	1st	8.30 m
2004	Olympic Games	Athens, Greece	6th	8.24 m
2005	World Championships	Helsinki, Finland	2nd	8.34 m
2006	World Indoor Championships	Moscow, Russia	1st	8.30 m
2006	Commonwealth Games	Melbourne, Australia	1st	8.20 m
2006	African Championships	Bambous, Mauritius	1st	8.51 m (w)
2007	All-Africa Games	Algiers, Algeria	6th (q)	7.80 m
2010	World Indoor Championships	Doha, Qatar	7th	7.81 m
2010	African Championships	Nairobi, Kenya	11th (q)	7.54 m
2010	Commonwealth Games	Delhi, India	3rd	8.12 m
2011	World Championships	Daegu, South Korea	17th (q)	7.92 m
2011	All-Africa Games	Maputo, Mozambique	2nd	7.86 m
2012	World Indoor Championships	Istanbul, Turkey	7th	7.86 m
2012	African Championships	Porto-Novo, Benin	3rd	7.73 m
2012	Olympic Games	London, United Kingdom	18th (q)	7.79 m
Representing Netherlands
2013	World Championships	Moscow, Russia	2nd	8.29 m
2014	World Indoor Championships	Sopot, Poland	10th (q)	7.99 m
2014	European Championships	Zurich, Switzerland	6th	8.08 m
2015	World Championships	Beijing, China	22nd (q)	7.77 m
2016	European Championships	Amsterdam, Netherlands	3rd	7.93 m

Awards
Preceded by Churandy Martina	Men's Dutch Athlete of the Year; 2013	Succeeded by Eelco Sintnicolaas
