= Robert Martey =

Ghanaian long jumper

Robert Martey (born 27 December 1984) is a retired Ghanaian long jumper.

He won the gold medal at the 2003 African Junior Championships, finished sixth at the 2003 All-Africa Games, seventh at the 2004 African Championships, eighth at the 2008 African Championships, seventh at the 2010 African Championships, tenth at the 2011 All-Africa Games, seventh at the 2012 African Championships, fourth at the 2014 African Championships and sixth at the 2014 Continental Cup. He also competed at the 2006 Commonwealth Games without reaching the final.

His personal best jump is 7.92 metres, achieved in July 2011 at Internationales Leichtathletik-Meeting in Rhede (LAZ Rhede).
