= Yaw Fosu-Amoah =

South African long jumper (born 1981)

Yaw Fosu-Amoah (born 8 October 1981 in Ghana) is a retired South African long jumper.

His personal best jump is 7.95 metres, achieved in the qualifying round at the 2006 Commonwealth Games. He is now a Housemaster at St. Andrews College in Makhanda, representing Merriman House. He coaches the second team rugby side ( Dawgs ) and is involved in wellness regarding sport. Married to Refilwe Fosu-Amoah (African Pageant Queen).

== Competition record ==
| Year | Competition | Venue | Position | Event | Notes |
Representing South Africa
| 2005 | Universiade | İzmir, Turkey | 11th | Long jump | 7.10 m |
| 2005 | Universiade | İzmir, Turkey | 9th (h) | 4 × 100 m relay | 40.42 s |
| 2006 | Commonwealth Games | Melbourne, Australia | 10th | Long jump | 7.71 m |
| 2006 | African Championships | Bambous, Mauritius | 9th | Long jump | 7.53 m |
| 2007 | All-Africa Games | Algiers, Algeria | 13th (q) | Long jump | 7.35 m |
| 2008 | African Championships | Addis Ababa, Ethiopia | 10th | Long jump | 7.63 m |
| 2009 | Universiade | Belgrade, Serbia | 24th (q) | Long jump | 7.17 m |
