= Samson Idiata =

Nigerian high and long jumper

Samson Idiata (born 23 January 1988 in Ewu) is a Nigerian high jumper and long jumper.

He took the bronze medal at the 2003 All-Africa Games, and later finished fifth at the 2006 African Championships and tenth at the 2007 All-Africa Games. He later switched to long jump. In this event he has finished eighth at the 2010 African Championships.

His personal best was 2.15 metres, first achieved in October 2003 in Hyderabad and later equalled once. In long jump his personal best is 8.00 metres, achieved in May 2013 in Castellón.

He was the gold medallist in the long jump at the 2015 African Games, but was stripped of this title after failing a drug test for clenbuterol. He was banned for four years, until 15 September 2019.

== Competition record ==
Year	Competition	Venue	Position	Event	Notes
Representing Nigeria
2003	All-Africa Games	Abuja, Nigeria	3rd	High jump	2.10 m
2003	Afro-Asian Games	Hyderabad, India	2nd	High jump	2.15 m
2006	African Championships	Bambous, Mauritius	5th	High jump	2.15 m
2007	All-Africa Games	Algiers, Algeria	10th	High jump	2.10 m
2010	African Championships	Nairobi, Kenya	8th	Long jump	7.51 m
2014	Commonwealth Games	Glasgow, United Kingdom	14th (q)	Long jump	7.57 m
2014	African Championships	Marrakesh, Morocco	5th	Long jump	7.78 m
2015	African Games	Brazzaville, Republic of the Congo	–	Long jump	DQ
