= Hatem Mersal =

Egyptian long jumper (born 1975)

Medal record

Men's athletics

Representing Egypt

African Championships
| Gold medal – first place | 1998 Dakar | Long jump |
| Silver medal – second place | 2000 Algiers | Long jump |
| Silver medal – second place | 2002 Radès | Long jump |

Mohamed Hassine Hatem Mersal (born 20 January 1975) is an Egyptian former long jumper.

His personal best jump is 8.31 metres, achieved in June 1999 in Oslo. This is the current national record.

== Achievements ==
| Year | Competition | Venue | Position | Event | Notes |
Representing Egypt
| 1997 | World Indoor Championships | Paris, France | 29th (q) | Long jump | 7.26 m |
| 1997 | Mediterranean Games | Bari, Italy | 10th | Long jump | 7.66 m |
| 1998 | African Championships | Dakar, Senegal | 1st | Long jump | 8.13 m |
| 1998 | World Cup | Johannesburg, South Africa | 3rd | Long jump | 8.26 m |
| 1999 | World Indoor Championships | Maebashi, Japan | 10th | Long jump | 7.66 m |
| 1999 | All-Africa Games | Johannesburg, South Africa | 1st | Long jump | 8.09 m |
| 2000 | African Championships | Algiers, Algeria | 2nd | Long jump | 7.90 m |
| 2002 | African Championships | Radès, Tunisia | 2nd | Long jump | 8.02 m (w) |
| 2004 | African Championships | Brazzaville, Republic of the Congo | 4th | Long jump | 7.68 m |
| 2005 | Islamic Solidarity Games | Mecca, Saudi Arabia | 6th | Long jump | 7.71 m |
| 2006 | African Championships | Bambous, Mauritius | 10th | Long jump | 7.51 m |
| 2007 | Pan Arab Games | Cairo, Egypt | 4th | 4 × 100 m relay | 40.17 m (NR) |
| 2007 | Pan Arab Games | Cairo, Egypt | 4th | Long jump | 7.83 m |
| 2008 | African Championships | Addis Ababa, Ethiopia | 6th | Long jump | 7.87 m |
