= Athletics at the 2014 Commonwealth Games – Men's long jump =

Men's long jump at the Commonwealth Games

The Men's long jump at the 2014 Commonwealth Games was part of the athletics programme. The two-day event was held at Hampden Park on 29 and 30 July 2014.

== Qualifying round ==
Qualifying rule: qualification standard 7.90m (Q) or at least best 12 qualified (q).

Rank	Group	Name	#1	#2	#3	Result	Notes
1	A	Greg Rutherford (ENG)	8.05			8.05	Q
2	A	Rushwahl Samaai (RSA)	x	8.03		8.03	Q
7	A	Tyrone Smith (BER)	7.60	7.87	–	7.87	q, SB
8	A	Henry Frayne (AUS)	7.85	x	–	7.85	q
9	A	Robert Crowther (AUS)	7.72	x	7.59	7.72	q
12	A	Tera Kiplangat (KEN)	7.42	7.61	7.57	7.61	q
13	A	Raymond Higgs (BAH)	7.61	7.31	7.41	7.61	
17	A	Carlos Morgan (CAY)	7.41	x	x	7.41	
18	A	Nicholas Gordon (JAM)	7.34	7.37	7.26	7.37	
20	A	Brandon Jones (BIZ)	7.09	x	7.02	7.09	
22	A	Boitu Baiteke (KIR)	6.37	6.35	6.26	6.37	PB
3	B	Zarck Visser (RSA)	x	7.99		7.99	Q
4	B	Fabrice Lapierre (AUS)	7.65	7.44	7.95	7.95	Q, SB
5	B	Damar Forbes (JAM)	7.90			7.90	Q
6	B	Chris Tomlinson (ENG)	7.89	–	–	7.89	q
10	B	David Registe (DMA)	x	7.70	x	7.70	q
11	B	JJ Jegede (ENG)	7.31	7.66	7.58	7.66	q
14	B	Samson Idiata (NGR)	x	7.57	7.55	7.57	
15	B	Leevan Sands (BAH)	x	x	7.48	7.48	
16	B	Ifeanyi Otuonye (TCI)	7.16	7.37	7.47	7.47	NR
19	B	Gervais Mpazambe (CMR)	x	6.90	7.26	7.26	
21	B	Carl Morgan (CAY)	x	6.99	x	6.99	
—N/a	B	Elijah Kimitei (KEN)	x	x	x	NM	
—N/a	A	Kyron Blaise (TRI)	x	x	x	NM	
—N/a	A	Hammed Suleman (NGR)	x	x	x	NM	

== Final round ==
Rank	Name	#1	#2	#3	#4	#5	#6	Result	Notes
1st place, gold medalist(s)	Greg Rutherford (ENG)	8.12	x	8.20	x	8.10	x	8.20	
2nd place, silver medalist(s)	Zarck Visser (RSA)	7.99	8.12	x	7.78	8.01	7.94	8.12	
3rd place, bronze medalist(s)	Rushwahl Samaai (RSA)	8.08	7.92	8.00	7.79	7.66	x	8.08	
4	Fabrice Lapierre (AUS)	8.00	–	–	x	x	7.88	8.00	SB
5	Chris Tomlinson (ENG)	7.95	7.99	7.74	7.93	7.88	7.93	7.99	
6	Robert Crowther (AUS)	7.96	x	x	x	–	7.39	7.96	
7	JJ Jegede (ENG)	7.74	7.81	x	7.55	7.35	x	7.81	
8	Tyrone Smith (BER)	7.75	x	7.71	7.42	x	7.79	7.79	
9	Damar Forbes (JAM)	x	7.71	7.57				7.71	
10	David Registe (DMA)	7.52	6.84	7.48				7.52	
11	Tera Kiplangat (KEN)	7.45	x	x				7.45	
—N/a	Henry Frayne (AUS)	x	x	x				NM	
