= Athletics at the 2001 Summer Universiade – Men's long jump =

The men's long jump event at the 2001 Summer Universiade was held at the Workers Stadium in Beijing, China on 27 and 29 August.

== Medalists ==
Gold	Silver	Bronze
Miguel Pate; United States	Stephan Louw; Namibia	Gable Garenamotse; Botswana

== Results ==
=== Qualification ===
Rank	Group	Athlete	Nationality	Result	Notes
1	B	Miguel Pate	United States	8.20	
2	B	Li Dalong	China	8.09	
3	A	Martin McClintock	South Africa	7.95	
4	A	Antonio Adsuar	Spain	7.89	
5	A	Kenta Bell	United States	7.89	
6	B	Stephan Louw	Namibia	7.83w	
7	A	Gable Garenamotse	Botswana	7.84w	
8	A	Volodymyr Zyuskov	Ukraine	7.83	
9	B	Ranko Leskovar	Slovenia	7.79	
10	B	Dmitriy Mitrofanov	Russia	7.73	
11	B	José Miguel Martínez	Spain	7.63	
12	A	Marijo Baković	Croatia	7.50	
13	B	Yann Domenech	France	7.48	
14	A	DeVon Bean	Bermuda	7.46	
15	B	Oliver König	Germany	7.41	
16	B	Wisnu Nugroho	Indonesia	7.00	
17	B	Leisner Aragón	Colombia	6.90	
18	A	Tamba Kortequee	Sierra Leone	6.52	
19	?	Ieong Sao Chun	Macau	6.28	
20	?	Alnobi Al-Kiyumi	Oman	5.75	

=== Final ===
Rank	Athlete	Nationality	Result	Notes
1st place, gold medalist(s)	Miguel Pate	United States	8.07	
2nd place, silver medalist(s)	Stephan Louw	Namibia	8.04	
3rd place, bronze medalist(s)	Gable Garenamotse	Botswana	7.99	
4	Volodymyr Zyuskov	Ukraine	7.92	
5	Antonio Adsuar	Spain	7.87	
6	Kenta Bell	United States	7.87	
7	Martin McClintock	South Africa	7.84	
8	Ranko Leskovar	Slovenia	7.70	
9	José Miguel Martínez	Spain	7.60	
10	Dmitriy Mitrofanov	Russia	7.40w	
11	Marijo Baković	Croatia	7.32	
	Li Dalong	China	DNS	
