= Peggy Sita Kihoue =

Congolese long jumper

Peggy Sita Kihoue is a retired Congolese long jumper.

He finished eighth at the 2004 African Championships, ninth at the 2005 Jeux de la Francophonie, fourteenth at the 2006 African Championships, eleventh at the 2008 African Championships, and sixth at the 2011 All-Africa Games. He also competed at the 2010 and 2014 African Championships without reaching the final.

His personal best jump is 7.44 metres, achieved at the 2011 All-Africa Games.
