= Romeo N'tia =

Beninese long jumper (born 1995)

Romeo N'tia (born 25 February 1995) is a Beninese long jumper.

He finished twelfth (in the triple jump) at the 2012 African Championships and competed at the 2014 African Championships without reaching the final. He then won the bronze medal at the 2015 African Games and finished seventh at the 2016 African Championships, fourth at the 2017 Islamic Solidarity Games and sixth at the 2018 African Championships

His personal best jump is 7.82 metres, achieved at the 2019 French Championships in Saint-Étienne. This is the Beninese record.
