= 2014 African Championships in Athletics – Men's long jump =

The men's long jump event at the 2014 African Championships in Athletics was held August 10–11 on Stade de Marrakech.

== Medalists ==
Gold	Silver	Bronze
Zarck Visser; South Africa	Godfrey Khotso Mokoena; South Africa	Rushwal Samaai; South Africa

== Results ==
=== Qualification ===
Qualifying performance: 7.80 (Q) or 12 best performers (q) advanced to the Final.

Rank	Group	Athlete	Nationality	#1	#2	#3	Result	Notes
1	A	Zarck Visser	South Africa	7.78	7.92		7.92	Q
2	B	Godfrey Khotso Mokoena	South Africa	7.87			7.87	Q
3	B	Rushwal Samaai	South Africa	7.71	7.86		7.86	Q
4	B	Ndiss Kaba Badji	Senegal	7.81			7.81	Q
5	B	Tera Langat	Kenya	7.43	7.40	7.74	7.74	q
6	B	Larona Koosimile	Botswana	7.69	7.49	x	7.69	q
7	A	Robert Martey	Ghana	4.57	7.67	–	7.67	q
8	A	Hammed Suleiman	Nigeria	7.64	7.60	–	7.64	q
9	B	Samson Idiata	Nigeria	5.70	7.60	x	7.57	q
10	B	Abderrahim Zehouani	Morocco	7.30	x	7.46	7.46	q
11	A	Elijah Kimitei	Kenya	7.43	7.14	7.30	7.43	q
12	A	Mamadou Chérif Dia	Mali	7.17	x	7.43	7.43	q
13	B	Hicham Douiri	Morocco	5.66	7.36	7.38	7.38	
14	A	Abdelkrim Mlaab	Morocco	7.38	6.99	7.22	7.38	
15	B	Marouene Mansour	Tunisia	7.07	7.27	7.31	7.31	
16	A	Ojulu Lingo	Ethiopia	6.84	7.30	7.07	7.30	
17	A	Armand Tsoaoule	Cameroon	7.29	7.20	x	7.29	
18	A	Ruri Rammokolodi	Botswana	6.91w	x	7.25	7.25	
19	B	Peggy Sita Kihoue	Republic of the Congo	6.80	7.04	7.15	7.15	
20	A	Romeo N'tia	Benin	6.37	6.64	6.86	6.86	

=== Final ===
Rank	Athlete	Nationality	#1	#2	#3	#4	#5	#6	Result	Notes
1st place, gold medalist(s)	Zarck Visser	South Africa	8.04w	x	8.00	8.08	7.75w	6.70w	8.08	
2nd place, silver medalist(s)	Godfrey Khotso Mokoena	South Africa	7.95	8.02	7.97	7.88w	7.93	7.79	8.02	
3rd place, bronze medalist(s)	Rushwal Samaai	South Africa	7.84w	7.41	7.39	–	–	6.14	7.84w	
4	Robert Martey	Ghana	7.48	x	7.80w	–	x	7.77	7.80w	
5	Samson Idiata	Nigeria	7.68	x	x	x	7.75	7.78	7.78	
6	Tera Langat	Kenya	x	7.61	x	7.63	7.65	x	7.65	
7	Elijah Kimitei	Kenya	7.31	7.50	7.58w	7.63w	7.45w	7.41	7.63w	
8	Ndiss Kaba Badji	Senegal	x	7.35	7.61w	7.39	x	x	7.61w	
9	Hammed Suleiman	Nigeria	x	7.50	7.56				7.56	
10	Abderrahim Zehouani	Morocco	7.50	7.44	x				7.50	
11	Larona Koosimile	Botswana	x	x	7.34w				7.34w	
12	Mamadou Chérif Dia	Mali	x	x	7.11				7.11	
