= Athletics at the 2011 All-Africa Games – Men's long jump =

The men's long jump event at the 2011 All-Africa Games was held on 15 September.

== Results ==
Rank	Athlete	Nationality	#1	#2	#3	#4	#5	#6	Result	Notes
1st place, gold medalist(s)	Luvo Manyonga	South Africa	7.59	x	x	7.83	8.02	7.82	8.02	
2nd place, silver medalist(s)	Ignisious Gaisah	Ghana	7.22	7.82	7.86	7.85	7.76	7.63	7.86	
3rd place, bronze medalist(s)	Ndiss Kaba Badji	Senegal	7.31	7.21	7.45	7.83	7.30	7.59	7.83	
4	Mohamed Fathalla Difallah	Egypt	x	7.74	x	7.77	x	x	7.77	
5	Ojulu Lingo Obang	Ethiopia	7.33	7.45	7.65	x	x	7.42	7.65	
6	Peggy Sita Kihoue	Republic of the Congo	x	7.14	7.44	x	7.12	5.48	7.44	
7	Larona Koosimile	Botswana	7.28	7.11	x	7.43	7.22	7.35	7.43	
8	Shola Anota	Nigeria	x	7.34	x	–	6.60	x	7.34	
9	Kudzanai Alberto	Mozambique	6.75	6.91	7.02				7.02	
10	Robert Martey	Ghana	5.42	x	6.96				6.96	
	Tera Langat	Kenya	x	x	x				NM	
