= Stephan Louw =

Namibian long jumper

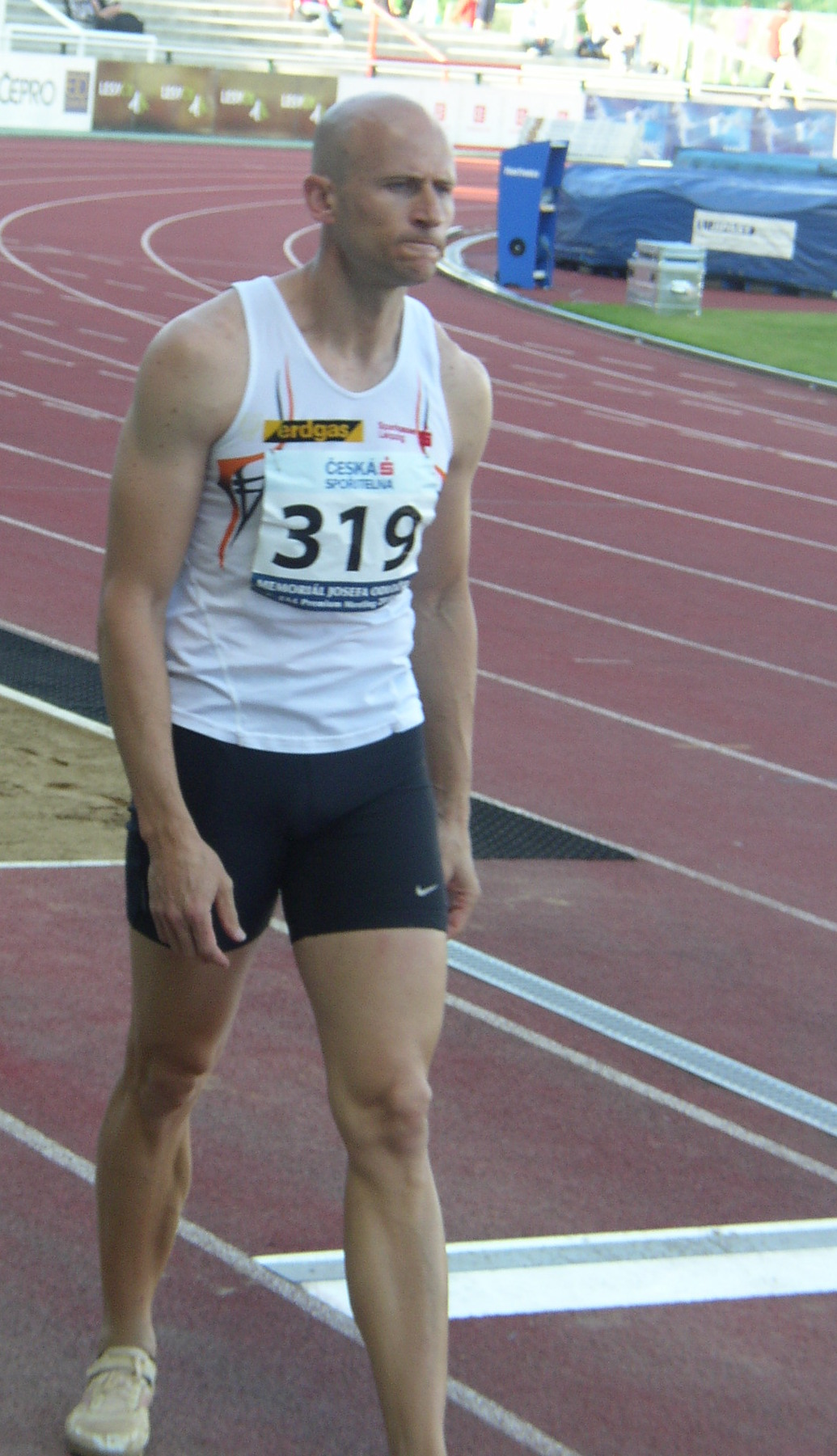
- Stephan Louw at the 2010 Josef Odložil Memorial in Prague

Personal information
- Born: 26 February 1975 (age 51)

Sport
- Sport: Track and field
Medal record
Representing Namibia
Summer Universiade
Silver medal – second place	2001 Beijing	Long jump
African Championships
Bronze medal – third place	2008 Addis Ababa	Long jump

Stephan Louw (born 26 February 1975) is a Namibian long jumper.

At the 2001 Summer Universiade he won the silver medal in long jump and participated in the 4 × 100 metres relay. The Namibian relay team, which consisted of Louw, Sherwin Vries, Thobias Akwenye and Benedictus Botha, finished fourth in a new Namibian record of 39.48 seconds. The same year Louw competed at the World Championships, without reaching the final round. He also competed at the 2000 Summer Olympics, but all his jumps were invalid.

He finished twelfth at the 2006 African Championships, and won the bronze medal at the 2008 African Championships. He competed at the 2008 Olympic Games without reaching the final.

His personal best jump is 8.24 metres, achieved in January 2008 in Johannesburg. This is the former Namibian record.

== Achievements ==
Year	Competition	Venue	Position	Event	Notes
Representing Namibia
1998	Commonwealth Games	Kuala Lumpur, Malaysia	9th	Long jump	7.46 m
2000	Olympic Games	Sydney, Australia	–	Long jump	NM
2001	World Championships	Edmonton, Canada	21st (q)	Long jump	7.62 m
2001	Universiade	Beijing, China	4th	4 × 100 m relay	39.48 s
2001	Universiade	Beijing, China	2nd	Long jump	8.04 m
2006	African Championships	Bambous, Mauritius	12th	Long jump	7.37 m (w)
2008	African Championships	Addis Ababa, Ethiopia	3rd	Long jump	7.98 m
2008	Olympic Games	Berlin, Germany	13th (q)	Long jump	7.93 m
2009	World Championships	Berlin, Germany	30th (q)	Long jump	7.74 m
