= Mamadou Chérif Dia =

Malian athlete (born 1984)

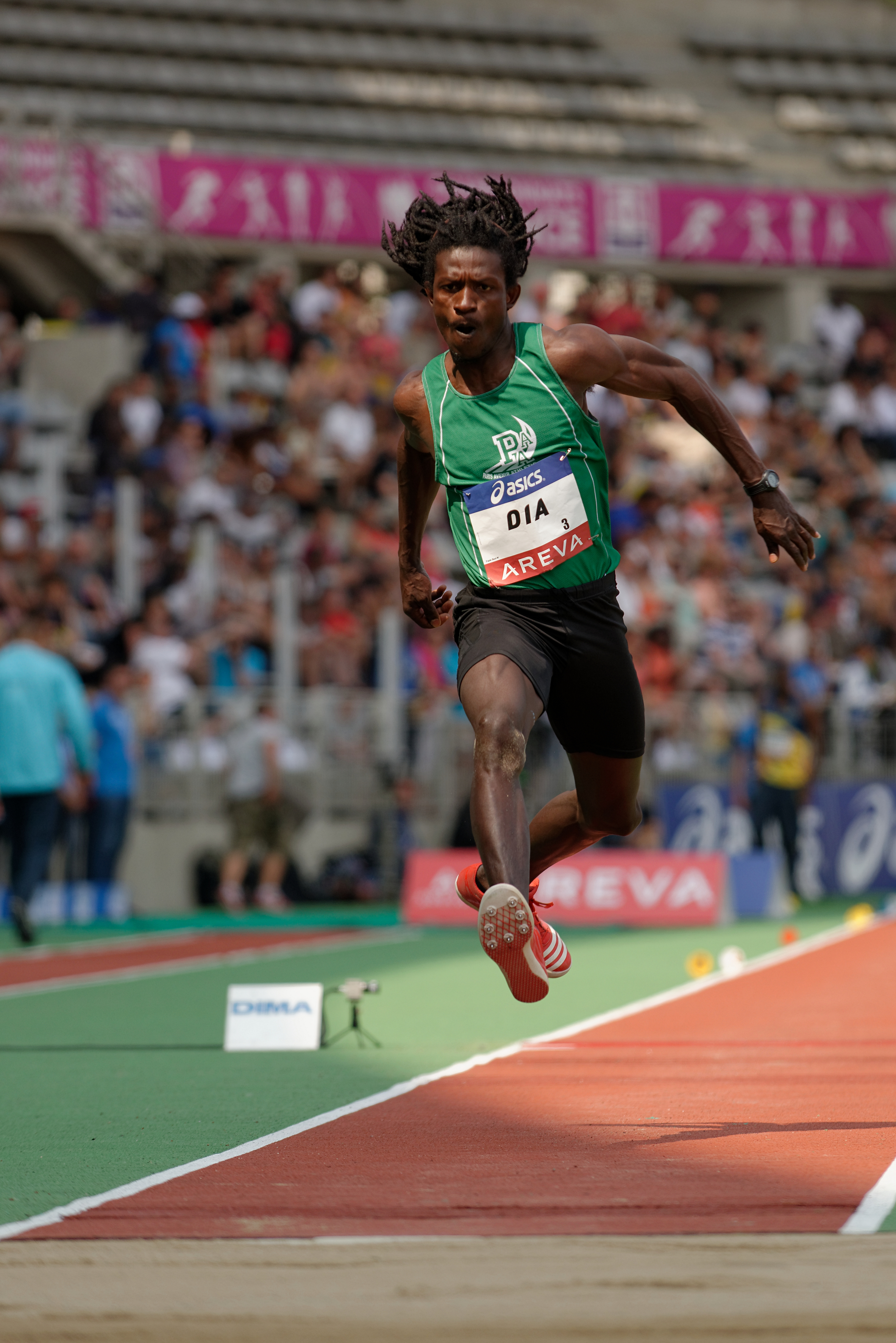
- Men triple jump French Athletics Championships 2013

Personal information
- Nationality: Mali
- Born: 16 October 1984 (age 41)

Sport
- Sport: Athletics
- Events: Long Jump, Triple Jump
Medal record
Men's Athletics
Representing Mali
African Games
Bronze medal – third place	2015 Brazzaville	Triple jump
- Updated on 26 August 2016

Mamadou Chérif Dia (born 16 October 1984) is a Malian athlete specialising in the long jump and triple jump. He won a bronze medal at the 2015 African Games.

His personal bests are 7.82 metres in the long jump (-0.9 m/s, Bamako 2010) and 16.55 metres in the triple jump (+0.3, Brazzaville 2015). Both results are current national records.

== Competition record ==
Year	Competition	Venue	Position	Event	Notes
Representing Mali
2006	African Championships	Bambous, Mauritius	15th	Long jump	7.09 m (w)
2007	All-Africa Games	Algiers, Algeria	7th	Long jump	7.75 m
2007	Universiade	Bangkok, Thailand	–	Long jump	NM
2010	African Championships	Nairobi, Kenya	6th	Long jump	7.73 m
2012	African Championships	Porto-Novo, Benin	8th	Long jump	7.35 m
2012	African Championships	Porto-Novo, Benin	8th	Triple jump	15.69 m
2013	Jeux de la Francophonie	Nice, France	8th	Long jump	7.58 m
2013	Jeux de la Francophonie	Nice, France	11th	Triple jump	15.70 m
2014	African Championships	Marrakesh, Morocco	12th	Long jump	7.11 m
2015	African Games	Brazzaville, Republic of the Congo	4th	Long jump	7.43 m
2015	African Games	Brazzaville, Republic of the Congo	3rd	Triple jump	16.55 m
2016	African Championships	Durban, South Africa	6th	Triple jump	16.29 m
2016	Olympic Games	Rio de Janeiro, Brazil	24th (q)	Triple jump	16.45 m
2017	Islamic Solidarity Games	Baku, Azerbaijan	4th	Triple jump	16.29 m
2017	Jeux de la Francophonie	Abidjan, Ivory Coast	3rd	Triple jump	16.59 m
2018	African Championships	Asaba, Nigeria	4th	Triple jump	16.44 m
2019	African Games	Rabat, Morocco	5th	Triple jump	16.14 m
