= Nabil Adamou =

Algerian long jumper

Personal information
- Born: 8 April 1975 (age 51)

Sport
- Sport: Track and field
Medal record
Representing Algeria
African Championships
Bronze medal – third place	2002 Radès	Long jump
Bronze medal – third place	2004 Brazzaville	Long jump

Nabil Adamou (born 8 April 1975) is a retired Algerian long jumper.

At the 1995 African Junior Championships he won the triple jump and won the silver medal in the long jump. He won bronze medals in the long jump at the 2002 and 2004 African Championships. He became Algerian champion in 1995 and 2002, facing competition from the likes of Lotfi Khaïda, Farid Hassa, Féthi Amira, Rédouane Youcef and Issam Nima.

His personal best jump is 7.96 metres, achieved in July 2002 in Annaba and repeated in April 2004 in Bamako.
