= Zarck Visser =

South African long jumper

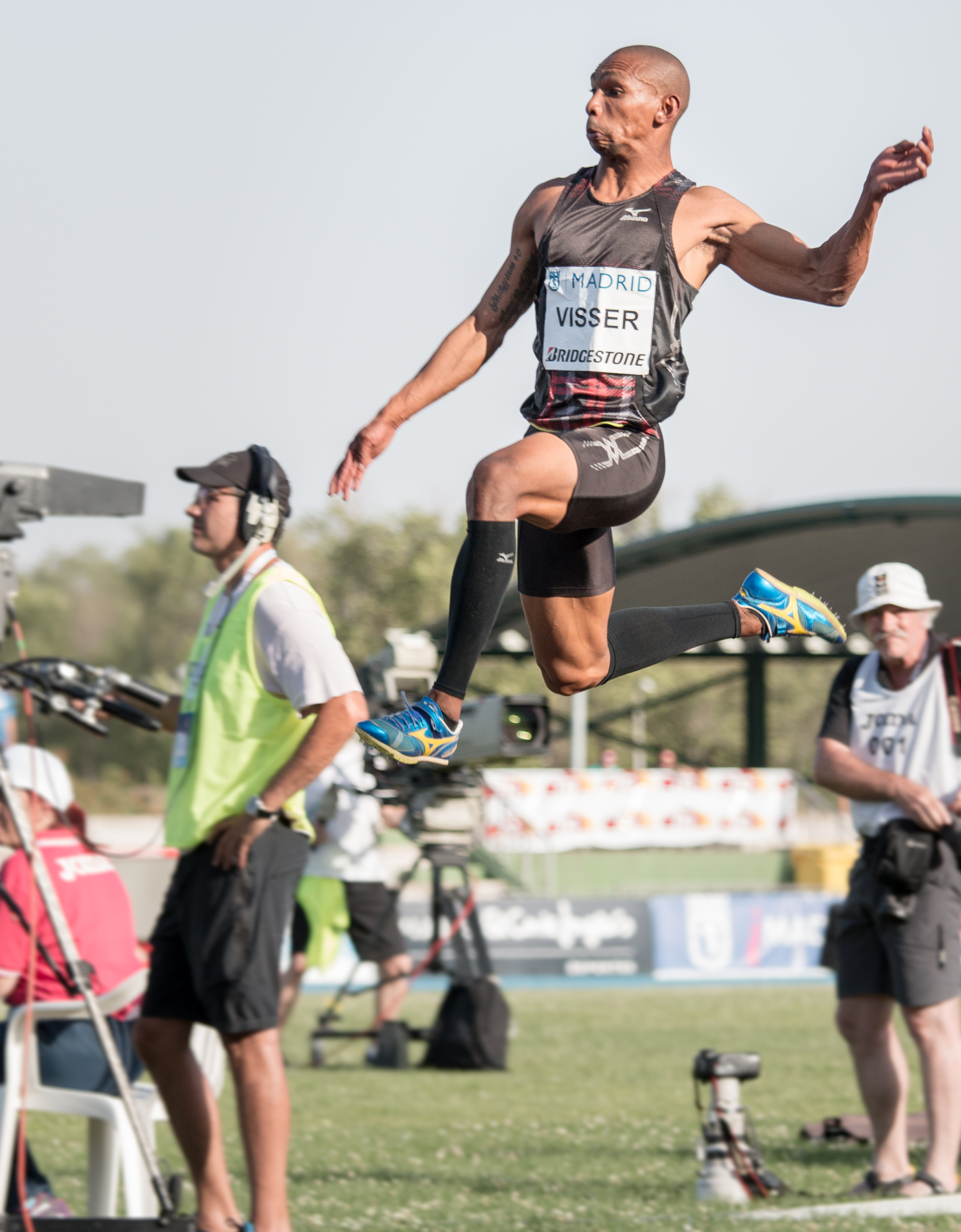
- Zarck Visser in 2017

Medal record

Men's athletics

Representing South Africa

Commonwealth Games
Silver medal – second place	2014 Glasgow	Long jump

African Championships
Gold medal – first place	2014 Marrakesh	Long jump
Silver medal – second place	2012 Porto-Novo	Long jump

Zarck Visser (born 15 September 1989) is a South African athlete specialising in the long jump. He won silver medal at the 2014 Commonwealth Games, as well as two medals at the African Championships.

His personal bests in the event are 8.41 metres outdoors (Bad Langensalza 2015) and 7.93 metres indoors (Sopot 2014).

== Competition record ==
Year	Competition	Venue	Position	Notes
Representing South Africa
2011	Universiade	Shenzhen, China	7th	7.81 m
2012	African Championships	Porto-Novo, Benin	2nd	7.98 m
2013	World Championships	Moscow, Russia	17th (q)	7.79 m
2014	World Indoor Championships	Sopot, Poland	12th (q)	7.93 m
2014	Commonwealth Games	Glasgow, United Kingdom	2nd	8.12 m
2014	African Championships	Marrakesh, Morocco	1st	8.08 m
2015	World Championships	Beijing, China	19th (q)	7.79 m
2017	World Championships	London, United Kingdom	25th (q)	7.66 m
