= Cadeau Kelley =

Liberian long jumper

Cadeau Kelley (born 9 May 1986) is a retired Liberian long jumper.

He finished sixth at the 2006 African Championships. He also competed at the 2007 All-Africa Games without reaching the final.

Kelley was an All-American jumper for the Akron Zips track and field team, finishing 7th in the long jump at the 2008 NCAA Division I Outdoor Track and Field Championships. He attended John Marshall High School in Ohio.

His personal best jump is 8.00 metres, achieved April 2009 in Ypsilanti. This is the Liberian record.
