= Darren Ritchie (long jumper) =

Scottish long jumper (born 1975)

Personal information
- Nationality: British (Scottish)
- Born: 1 February 1975 (age 51) Edinburgh, Scotland

Sport
- Sport: Athletics
- Event: Long jump
- Club: Sale Harriers

Darren Ritchie (born 1 February 1975) is a Scottish former long jumper.

== Biography ==
Ritchie, born in Edinburgh, Scotland, was a six-time Scottish long jump champion, and also won the triple jump in 2004. He also added two Scottish indoor titles in long jump.

He was athree-times British long jump champion after winning the British AAA Championships title in 1996, 2002 and 2003.

He finished fourth at the 2002 Commonwealth Games, missing the bronze medal with a one centimetre margin. He also narrowly missed the qualification standards for the 1996 and 2004 Summer Olympics, although in the latter case he came close with a new Scottish record of 8.01 metres.

He lives in Bo'ness and his club was Sale Harriers. He has also been based in Oslo, Norway.

Ritchie is currently Scottish Athletics National Jumps and Combined Events Manager (September 2008).
