= Stanley Gbagbeke =

Nigerian long jumper

Medal record

Men's athletics

Representing Nigeria

African Championships
Bronze medal – third place	2010 Nairobi	Long jump

Stanley Gbagbeke (born 24 July 1989 in Oginibo, Delta State) is a Nigerian long jumper. He competed in the long jump event at the 2012 Summer Olympics.

Gbagbeke was an All-American jumper for the Middle Tennessee Blue Raiders track and field team, finishing runner-up in the long jump at the 2009 NCAA Division I Outdoor Track and Field Championships and 2010 NCAA Division I Outdoor Track and Field Championships.

== Competition record ==
Year	Competition	Venue	Position	Event	Notes
Representing Nigeria
2009	World Championships	Berlin, Germany	27th (q)	Long jump	7.82 m
2010	African Championships	Nairobi, Kenya	3rd	Long jump	8.06 m
2010	Commonwealth Games	Delhi, India	–	4 × 100 m relay	DQ
2010	Commonwealth Games	Delhi, India	4th	Long jump	7.98 m
2011	Universiade	Shenzhen, China	9th (h)	4 × 100 m relay	40.43 s
2011	Universiade	Shenzhen, China	4th	Long jump	7.96 m
2012	African Championships	Porto-Novo, Benin	5th	Long jump	7.65 m
2012	Olympic Games	London, United Kingdom	27th (q)	Long jump	7.59 m
