= Issam Nima =

Algerian long jumper (born 1979)

Personal information
- Born: April 8, 1979 (age 47) El Biar, Algeria
- Height: 1.87 m (6 ft 1 1/2 in)
- Weight: 75 kg (165 lb)

Sport
- Country: Algeria
- Sport: Athletics
- Events: Triple jump, Long jump

Achievements and titles
- Personal bests: Long jump: 8.26 m Triple jump:16.89 m
Medal record
Men's athletics
Representing Algeria
All-Africa Games
Silver medal – second place	2011 Maputo	Triple jump
African Championships
Silver medal – second place	2012 Porto-Novo	Triple jump
- Updated on 15 August 2012

Issam Nima (Arabic: عصام نيمة; born 8 April 1979) is an Algerian long jumper. His personal best long jump is 8.26 metres, achieved in July 2007 in Zaragoza which stands as the Algerian record as of today. He has also competed in the triple jump, appearing in this event at the 2012 Summer Olympics without reaching the final. His personal best in the triple jump is 16.89 metres achieve in Prague in 2012.

== Competition record ==
Year	Competition	Venue	Position	Event	Notes
Representing Algeria
2002	African Championships	Radès, Tunisia	4th	Long jump	7.93 m
2004	Pan Arab Games	Algiers, Algeria	1st	Long jump	7.81 m
2005	Islamic Solidarity Games	Mecca, Saudi Arabia	2nd	Long jump	8.11 m
2005	Mediterranean Games	Almería, Spain	2nd	Long jump	7.92 m
2005	World Championships	Helsinki, Finland	11th	Long jump	7.73 m
2005	Universiade	İzmir, Turkey	2nd	Long jump	8.02 m
2006	World Indoor Championships	Moscow, Russia	8th	Long jump	7.84 m (iNR)
2006	African Championships	Bambous, Mauritius	3rd	Long jump	8.37 m
2006	World Athletics Final	Stuttgart, Germany	8th	Long jump	7.73 m
2007	All-Africa Games	Algiers, Algeria	4th	Long jump	7.98 m
2007	World Championships	Osaka, Japan	17th (q)	Long jump	7.88 m
2007	Pan Arab Games	Cairo, Egypt	3rd	Long jump	7.98 m
2008	World Indoor Championships	Valencia, Spain	16th (q)	Long jump	7.45 m
2008	African Championships	Addis Ababa, Ethiopia	5th	Long jump	7.92 m
2009	Mediterranean Games	Pescara, Italy	5th	Long jump	7.87 m
2010	World Indoor Championships	Doha, Qatar	9th (q)	Long jump	7.88 m
2011	All-Africa Games	Maputo, Mozambique	2nd	Triple jump	16.54 m
2011	Arab Championships	Al Ain, United Arab Emirates	1st	Triple jump	16.41 m
2011	Pan Arab Games	Doha, Qatar	4th	Long jump	7.56 m
2011	Pan Arab Games	Doha, Qatar	1st	Triple jump	16.59 m
2012	African Championships	Porto-Novo, Benin	2nd	Triple jump	16.69 m
2012	Olympic Games	London, United Kingdom	15th (q)	Triple jump	16.50 m
2013	Arab Championships	Doha, Qatar	1st	Triple jump	17.01 m (w)
2014	African Championships	Marrakesh, Morocco	4th	Triple jump	16.61 m (w)
