= Jonathan Chimier =

Mauritian long jumper

Personal information
- Nationality: Mauritian
- Born: 6 August 1982 (age 44) Mauritius

Sport
- Sport: Track and Field
- Events: Long Jump, 60 metres
Medal record
Men's athletics
Representing Mauritius
African Championships
Gold medal – first place	2004 Brazzaville	Long jump
Silver medal – second place	2008 Addis Ababa	Long jump
Francophone Games
Gold medal – first place	2001 Ottawa	Long Jump
Indian Ocean Island Games
Bronze medal – third place	2003 Reduit	Long Jump

Jonathan James Chimier (born 6 August 1982) is a Mauritian long jumper who won the 2004 African Championships in Athletics.

His personal best jump is 8.28 metres, achieved while competing in the 2004 Summer Olympics. This is the Mauritian record. He is also a sprinter and competes mainly in the 60 metres. He holds the Mauritian record in the event with a time of 6.68 seconds ahead of Stephan Buckland's 6.72.

== Achievements ==
Year	Meeting	Venue	Result	Event	Extra
1999	African Junior Athletics Championships	Tunis, Tunisia	2nd	Long Jump	7.44
2000	Championnats Nationaux de Maurice	Reduit, Mauritius	1st	Long Jump	7.05
2000	24° Trofeo Maurina	Imperia, Italy	1st	Long Jump	7.53
2000	Meeting Pre-Olympic Warmup	Sydney, Australia	2nd	Long Jump	7.16
2001	African Junior Championships	Reduit, Mauritius	1st	Long Jump	7.48
2001	African Junior Championships	Reduit, Mauritius	1st	4 × 100 m	41.50
2001	Meeting Trofeo Atletica Maurina	Imperia, Italy	2nd	Long Jump	7.70
2001	Francophone Games	Ottawa, Canada	4th	Long Jump Qualification	7.65
2001	Francophone Games	Ottawa, Canada	1st	Long Jump Final	7.89
2001	Championnats de France Elite	Saint Etienne, France	3rd	Long Jump Final	8.03
2001	Apres Midi Des Stars	Reduit, Mauritius	4th	400m	49.39
2001	Apres Midi Des Stars	Reduit, Mauritius	2nd	Long Jump	7.48
2002	Championnats de France N2	Sotteville, France	5th	Long Jump Qualification	7.05
2002	Meeting AcrobalenoAtleticaEuropa	Celle Ligure, Italy	5th	Long Jump	7.42
2002	IAAF Permit Meeting Russian Winter	Moscow, Russia	2nd	60m	6.72
2002	IAAF Permit Meeting Russian Winter	Moscow, Russia	1st	Long Jump	7.57
2002	Meeting de Valbonne	Valbonne, France	1st	Long Jump	7.56
2002	Championnats Nationaux Vital	Reduit, Mauritius	2nd	Long Jump	7.59
2002	Air Mauritius International Meeting	Reduit, Mauritius	1st	Long Jump	7.74
2002	Meeting EAP Altetica Geneve	Geneva, Switzerland	3rd	Long Jump	7.70
2002	Commonwealth Games	Manchester, England	4th	Long Jump Qualification	7.75
2002	Commonwealth Games	Manchester, England	10th	Long Jump Final	7.49
2002	Commonwealth Games	Manchester, England	6th	4 × 100 m Semifinal	40.05
2003	Dakar Meeting	Dakar, Senegal	2nd	Long Jump	7.45
2003	Preparation meet, CIAD Dakar	Dakar, Senegal	1st	Long Jump	7.52
2003	Dakar Regional Championships	Dakar, Senegal	2nd	Long Jump	7.60
2003	Intersport Gugl Meeting	Linz, Austria	2nd	Long Jump	7.85
2003	Meeting de Marseille	Marseille, France	1st	Long Jump	8.08
2003	Meeting Internazionale Sestriere	Sestriere, Italy	1st	Long Jump	8.26
2004	IAAF Permit Meeting Russian Winter	Moscow, Russia	5th	Long Jump	7.72
2004	Governor Cup	Samara, Russia	7th	Long Jump	7.77
2004	IAAF World Indoor Championships	Budapest, Hungary	8th	Long Jump Qualification	7.78
2004	Skyline International Meeting	Reduit, Mauritius	3rd	Long Jump	7.67
2004	Rhythm'N'Jump Meeting	Pierrelatte, France	3rd	Long Jump	7.80
2004	Meeting Internazionale Citta di Lugano	Lugano, Switzerland	1st	Long Jump	8.10
2004	Meeting Internazionale Citta di Avellino	Avellino, Italy	1st	Long Jump	7.79
2004	CAA Grand Prix	Algiers, Algeria	1st	Long Jump	8.03
2004	Meeting AcrobalenoAtleticaEuropa	Celle Ligure, Italy	1st	Long Jump	7.89
2004	Meeting Internazionale Citta di Padova	Padova, Italy	1st	Long Jump	7.94
2004	Meeting Internazionale Sestriere	Sestriere, Italy	4th	Long Jump	8.05
2004	Meeting International Rabat	Rabat, Morocco	5th	Long Jump	7.82
2004	Meeting Internationale Resisprint	La Chaux-de-Fonds, Switzerland	5th	Long Jump	7.28
2004	Championnats de France Elite Indoor	Aubiere, France	2nd	Long Jump Qualification	7.54
2004	Championnats de France Elite Indoor	Aubiere, France	1st	Long Jump Final	8.05
2004	African Athletics Championships	Brazzaville, Congo	1st	Long Jump	8.06
2004	Athens Olympic Games	Athens, Greece	1st	Long Jump Qualification	8.28(NR)
2004	Athens Olympic Games	Athens, Greece	10th	Long Jump Final	8.03
2005	Governor Cup	Samara, Russia	4th	Long Jump	7.83
2005	Finnish Elite Games Series	Tampere, Finland	2nd	Long Jump	7.83
2005	Interrégionaux Île-de-France Seniors	Bondoufle, France	1st	Long Jump	7.75
2005	Malser Sommer International Meeting	Mals, Italy	1st	Long Jump	7.93
2005	Skyline International Meeting	Reduit, Mauritius	1st	Long Jump	7.94
2005	Skyline International Meeting	Reduit, Mauritius	6th	100m	10.81
2005	Sparkassen Cup	Stuttgart, Germany	1st	Long Jump	7.97
2005	Critériums Nationaux des Spécialités	Obernai, France	1st	Long Jump	7.73
2005	Chpt de France Interclubs N1A Hommes	Franconville, France	1st	100m	11.13
2005	Chpt de France Interclubs N1A Hommes	Franconville, France	4th	Long Jump	7.29
2005	Meeting IAAF Gaz de France du Pas de Calais	Liévin, France	4th	Long Jump	7.71
2005	Dakar International Meeting	Dakar, Senegal	7th	Long Jump	7.24
2005	Meeting AcrobalenoAtleticaEuropa	Celle Ligure, Italy	3rd	100m	10.64
2005	Memorial Josefa Odlozila	Prague, Czech Republic	4th	Long Jump	7.85
2005	IAAF World Athletics Championships	Helsinki, Finland	7th	Long Jump Qualification	7.65
2006	Championnats Regionaux en Salle	Eaubonne, France	1st	60m	6.88
2006	Championnats 75 Cad, Jun, Esp, Sen	Paris, France	1st	Long Jump	7.17
2006	CAA Grand Prix Algiers	Algiers, Algeria	7th	Long Jump	7.29
2006	Meeting National D1 de Strasbourg	Strasbourg, France	4th	Long Jump	7.42
2006	Sparkassen Cup	Stuttgart, Germany	6th	Long Jump	7.65
2006	Championnats Nationaux Interclubs Elite Finale	Franconville, France	2nd	Long Jump	7.70
2006	Meeting National à Thème de Pierre Bénite	Pierre-Bénite, France	1st	Long Jump	7.90
2006	Meeting Rhythm'N'Jump	Pierrelatte, France	2nd	Long Jump	8.07
2007	Championnats Nationaux Interclubs Elite Finale	Montreuil-sous-Bois, France	2nd	Long Jump	6.99
2007	Championnats Départementaux (92 - 75)	Paris, France	2nd	Long Jump	7.40
2007	Meeting Rhythm'N'Jump	Pierrelatte, France	2nd	Long Jump	7.56
2007	Meeting National à Thème 13e Envol Trophée	Pierre-Bénite, France	2nd	Long Jump	7.68
2007	Championnats de France Elite	Niort, France	2nd	Long Jump	7.74
2007	Championnats Nationaux	Tourlaville, France	3rd	Long Jump Qualification	7.39
2007	Championnats Nationaux	Tourlaville, France	1st	Long Jump Final	7.95
2007	7th Indian Ocean Island Games	Antananarivo, Madagascar	1st	Long Jump Final	7.86
2008	Championnats Nationaux Interclubs Elite Finale	Villeneuve-d'Ascq, Mauritius	2nd	Long Jump	7.37
2008	Championnats Nationaux Interclubs Elite Finale	Villeneuve-d'Ascq, Mauritius	1st	100m	10.68
2008	Mauritius International Meeting	Reduit, Mauritius	4th	100m	10.69
2008	Mauritius International Meeting	Reduit, Mauritius	2nd	Long Jump	7.48
2008	Championnats Regionaux en Salle	Paris, France	1st	Long Jump	7.50
2008	Championnats Île-de-France Senior	Eaubonne, France	1st	Long Jump	7.56
2008	Championnats de France Elite en salle	Bordeaux, France	3rd	Long Jump Qualification	7.49
2008	Championnats de France Elite en salle	Bordeaux, France	3rd	Long Jump Final	7.83
2008	Meeting Gaz de France Clermont Auvergne	Aubière, France	2nd	Long Jump	7.70
2008	Meeting du Conseil General de la Martinique	Fort-de-Frances, France	6th	Long Jump	7.75
2008	Championnats de France Elite	Albi, France	5th	Long Jump	7.74
2008	Meeting International Mohammed VI d'Athlétisme	Rabat, Morocco	3rd	Long Jump	7.67
2008	Internationales Leichtathletik-Meeting Anhalt	Dessau, Germany	6th	Long Jump	7.78
2008	Interclubs Elite/N1/N2 1er tour	Versailles, France	1st	Long Jump	7.55
2008	Meeting qualificatif VDM-UAIN	Nogent-sur-Marne, France	1st	Long Jump	7.94
2008	African Athletics Championships	Addis Ababa, Ethiopia	2nd	Long Jump Final	7.99
2009	Chpt Regionaux en Salle	Paris, France	2nd	Long Jump	7.20
2009	Meeting Indoor de Mondeville	Mondeville, France	7th	Long Jump	7.27
2009	Interclubs 1er Tour : Elite/N1 C/N2	Tremblay-en-France, France	3rd	Long Jump	6.94
2009	Meeting National D1 de Montgeron	Montgeron, France	2nd	Long Jump	7.46
2009	Meeting International Mohammed VI d'Athlétisme	Rabat, Morocco	7th	Long Jump	7.57
2009	Meeting National D1 GDF SUEZ	Hérouville-St-Clair, France	1st	Long Jump	7.54
2009	Meeting National à Thème de Pierre Bénite	Pierre Bénite, France	3rd	Long Jump	7.66
2009	Meeting Aniversario Da Aal Estadio Do Inatel	Lisbon, Portugal	2nd	Long Jump	7.68
2010	Interclubs 1er Tour Brassage N1	Conflans-Ste-Honorine, France	3rd	Triple Jump	14.55
2010	Chpts Nationaux Interclubs Elite Finale	Franconville, France	4th	Long Jump	7.55
2010	Meeting National D1 de Nantes	Nantes, France	8th	Long Jump	6.94
2010	Meeting National D1 d'Albertville	Albertville, France	4th	Long Jump	6.87
2011	Interclubs Départementaux	Franconville, France	1st	Triple Jump	14.49
2011	Interclubs Départementaux	Franconville, France	1st	100m	11.55
2011	Championnats départementaux en salle 75 et 93	Eaubonne, France	1st	Long Jump	7.03

=== Personal Bests ===
Date	Event	Venue	Time/Mark
23 February 2003	60 metres	Moscow, Russia	6.68 (National record)
27 March 2002	100 metres	Bamako, Mali	10.36
24 August 2004	Long Jump	Athens, Greece	8.28m (National record)
22 February 2004	Long Jump Indoor	Aubiere, France	8.05m (National record)
Unknown	Long Jump Juniors Mauritius	Unknown	7.89 (National record)
