= Ndiss Kaba Badji =

Senegalese athlete

Personal information
- Born: 21 September 1983 (age 42)
- Height: 1.9 m (6 ft 3 in)
- Weight: 85 kg (187 lb)

Sport
- Country: Senegal
- Sport: Athletics
- Event: Long jump
Medal record
Men's athletics
Representing Senegal
All-Africa Games
| Gold medal – first place | 2007 Algiers | Triple jump |
| Gold medal – first place | 2015 Brazzaville | Triple jump |
| Silver medal – second place | 2003 Abuja | Long jump |
| Bronze medal – third place | 2011 Maputo | Long jump |
African Championships
| Gold medal – first place | 2008 Addis Ababa | Triple jump |
| Gold medal – first place | 2012 Porto-Novo | Long jump |
| Silver medal – second place | 2004 Brazzaville | Long jump |
| Silver medal – second place | 2010 Nairobi | Long jump |
- Updated on 26 August 2016

Ndiss Kaba Badji (born 21 September 1983) is a Senegalese athlete who competes in the long jump and triple jump. He is the Senegalese record holder for the triple jump, with 17.07 metres, which he achieved when he won the 2008 African Championships. He has a personal best long jump of 8.32 metres, achieved in October 2009 in Beirut, which won him the silver medal at the 2009 Jeux de la Francophonie.

== Early career ==
Badji won a silver medal at the African Junior Championships in 2001. He then competed at the 2002 World Junior Championships in Kingston, Jamaica. Here, he finished ninth in the triple jump. In the long jump competition he exited in the qualification round with a result of 7.37 metres. He missed the final round by only one centimetre. His personal bests at that time were 7.83 metres in the long jump and 16.30 metres in the triple jump, both achieved in Dakar. Later that season he finished fifth at the African Championships in Athletics. He jumped 7.90 m, albeit with a wind assistance of 3.6 m/s.

In 2003 he finished fifth at the Universiade and won the silver medal at the All-Africa Games in Abuja. His distance achieved there—7.92 metres—was a new personal best.

== International career ==
=== Breakthrough and fall ===
In 2004 Badji broke the 8-metre barrier for the first time, jumping 8.00 metres at an indoor meet in February in Moscow. In March he competed at the World Indoor Championships, albeit without reaching the final. However, he capitalized on his 8.00 m result during the outdoor season. He won a silver medal at the African Championships in July, and on 1 August he jumped 8.20 metres at a high altitude in Sestriere. At the Olympic Games three weeks later, however, he failed to reach the final round.

Then, in an IAAF out-of-competition test conducted in March 2005, Badji tested positive for the illegal substance androstenedione. As a result, he was barred from competing in the sport between June 2005 and May 2007.

=== Return ===
Badji returned from his suspension in time for the 2007 season. In June in Algiers he achieved a long jump of 8.11 m. At the All-Africa Games held in the same city one month later he won the triple jump competition, with a new personal best of 16.80 metres. He entered the 2007 World Championships in Osaka, where he finished seventh in the long jump competition. He was the only Senegalese athlete to reach a final at the 2008 Olympic Games. He was also scheduled to enter in the triple jump, but did not actually compete.

In 2008 he improved further. At the African Championships he only competed in triple jump, but won the gold medal with a new national record of 17.07 metres. At the Olympic Games in August he finished sixth in the long jump competition with a season's best of 8.16 metres. Again he also entered in triple jump, but fouled all his jumps. At the 2008 World Athletics Final he finished seventh in the long jump and eighth in the triple jump.

In early 2009 it was announced that Badji had been awarded the Lion d’Or by the newspaper Le Soleil. He was also elected Sportsman of the Year by the Senegalese sports press.

== Competition record ==
| Year | Competition | Venue | Position | Event | Notes |
Representing Senegal
| 2001 | African Junior Championships | Réduit, Mauritius | 4th | Long jump | 7.08 m |
| 2001 | African Junior Championships | Réduit, Mauritius | 2nd | Triple jump | 15.09 m |
| 2002 | World Junior Championships | Kingston, Jamaica | 15th (q) | Long jump | 7.37 m (wind: -1.5 m/s) |
| 2002 | World Junior Championships | Kingston, Jamaica | 9th | Triple jump | 15.29 m (wind: +0.3 m/s) |
| 2002 | African Championships | Radès, Tunisia | 5th | Long jump | 7.90 m |
| 2003 | All-Africa Games | Abuja, Nigeria | 2nd | Long jump | 7.92 m |
| 2003 | Afro-Asian Games | Hyderabad, India | 2nd | Long jump | 7.86 m |
| 2004 | World Indoor Championships | Budapest, Hungary | 22nd (q) | Long jump | 7.54 m |
| 2004 | African Championships | Brazzaville, Republic of the Congo | 2nd | Long jump | 7.86 m |
| 2004 | Olympic Games | Athens, Greece | 27th (q) | Long jump | 7.74 m |
| 2005 | Islamic Solidarity Games | Mecca, Saudi Arabia | 3rd | Long jump | 8.02 m |
| 2005 | Islamic Solidarity Games | Mecca, Saudi Arabia | 2nd | Triple jump | 16.34 m |
| 2007 | World Championships | Osaka, Japan | 7th | Long jump | 8.01 m |
| 2007 | All-Africa Games | Algiers, Algeria | 5th | Long jump | 7.84 m |
| 2007 | All-Africa Games | Algiers, Algeria | 1st | Triple jump | 16.80 m |
| 2008 | African Championships | Addis Ababa, Ethiopia | 1st | Triple jump | 17.07 m (NR) |
| 2008 | Olympic Games | Beijing, China | 6th | Long jump | 8.16 m |
| 2008 | Olympic Games | Beijing, China | – | Triple jump | NM |
| 2009 | Universiade | Belgrade, Serbia | 2nd | Long jump | 8.19 m (w) |
| 2009 | World Championships | Berlin, Germany | 18th (q) | Long jump | 7.98 m |
| 2009 | Jeux de la Francophonie | Beirut, Lebanon | 2nd | Long jump | 8.32 m |
| 2010 | World Indoor Championships | Doha, Qatar | 6th | Long jump | 7.86 m |
| 2010 | African Championships | Nairobi, Kenya | 2nd | Long jump | 8.10 m |
| 2011 | All-Africa Games | Maputo, Mozambique | 3rd | Long jump | 7.83 m |
| 2012 | World Indoor Championships | Istanbul, Turkey | 5th | Long jump | 7.97 m |
| 2012 | African Championships | Porto-Novo, Benin | 1st | Long jump | 8.04 m |
| 2012 | Olympic Games | London, United Kingdom | 24th (q) | Long jump | 7.66 m |
| 2013 | World Championships | Moscow, Russia | 22nd (q) | Long jump | 7.62 m |
| 2014 | African Championships | Marrakesh, Morocco | 8th | Long jump | 7.61 m (w) |

Olympic Games
| Preceded by Leyti Seck | Flagbearer for Senegal; 2012 London | Succeeded by Isabelle Sambou |
