= Godfrey Khotso Mokoena =

South African athlete

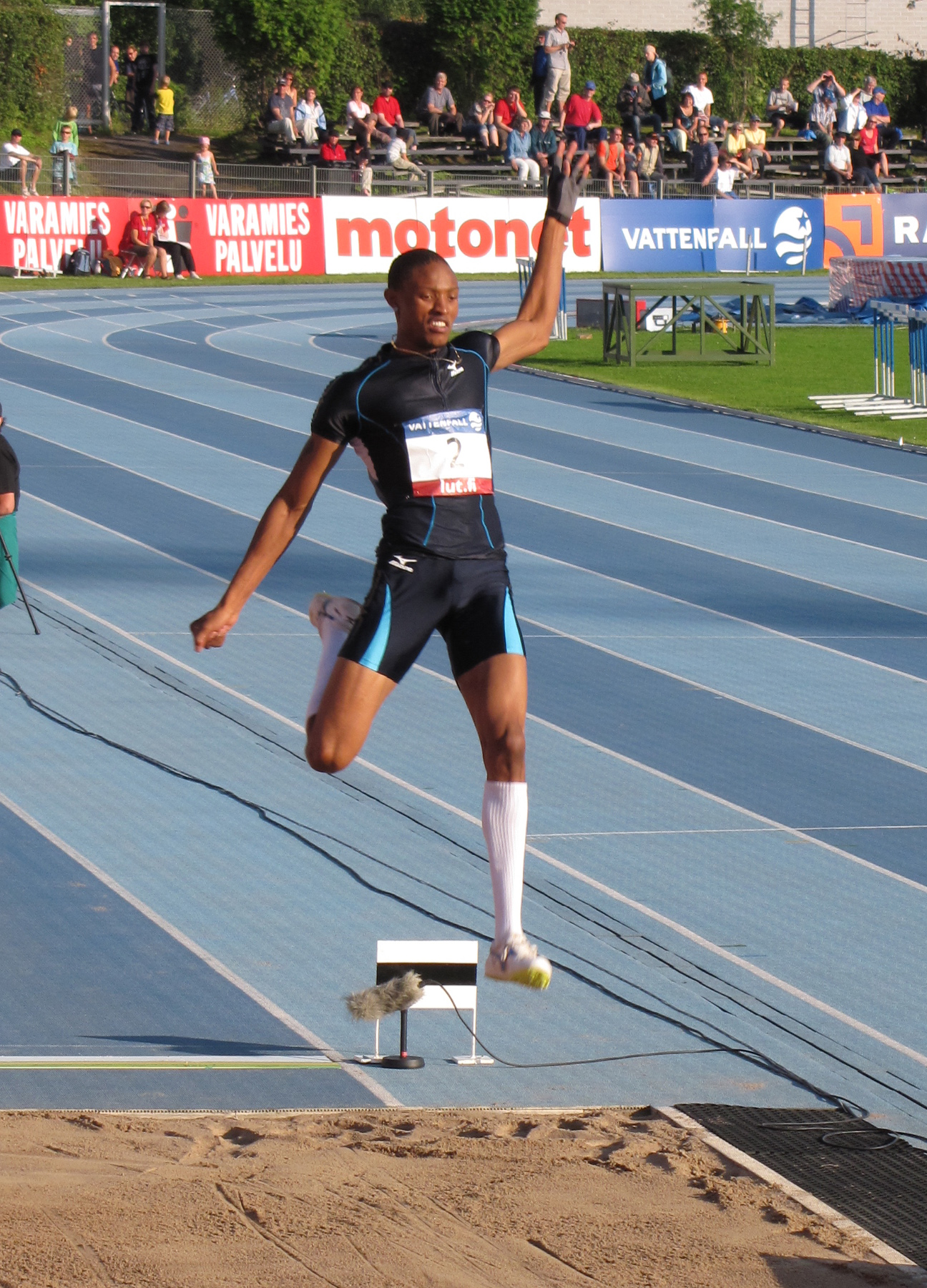
- Mokoena at the 2009 Lappeenranta Games

Personal information
- Born: 6 March 1985 (age 41) Heidelberg, South Africa
- Height: 1.90 m (6 ft 3 in)
- Weight: 73 kg (161 lb)

Sport
- Country: South Africa
- Sport: Athletics
- Event: Long jump
Medal record
Men's athletics
Representing South Africa
Olympic Games
Silver medal – second place	2008 Beijing	Long jump
World Championships
Silver medal – second place	2009 Berlin	Long jump
World Indoor Championships
Gold medal – first place	2008 Valencia	Long jump
Silver medal – second place	2010 Doha	Long jump
World Athletics Final
Bronze medal – third place	2007 Stuttgart	Long Jump
Bronze medal – third place	2009 Thessaloniki	Long Jump
World Indoor Tour
Winner	2017	Long jump
African Championships
Gold medal – first place	2010 Nairobi	Long jump
Gold medal – first place	2014 Marrakesh	Triple jump
Silver medal – second place	2006 Bambous	Long jump
Silver medal – second place	2006 Bambous	Triple jump
Silver medal – second place	2014 Marrakesh	Long jump
Silver medal – second place	2018 Asaba	Triple jump
Bronze medal – third place	2016 Durban	Triple jump
Commonwealth Games
Gold medal – first place	2014 Glasgow	Triple Jump
Silver medal – second place	2006 Melbourne	Triple Jump
All-Africa Games
Silver medal – second place	2003 Abuja	Triple Jump
Bronze medal – third place	2003 Abuja	Long Jump
Bronze medal – third place	2007 Algiers	Long Jump
Afro-Asian Games
Bronze medal – third place	2003 Hyderabad	Long Jump
Bronze medal – third place	2003 Hyderabad	Triple Jump
World Junior Championships
Gold medal – first place	2004 Grosseto	Triple Jump
Silver medal – second place	2004 Grosseto	Long Jump
- Updated on 15 August 2012

Godfrey Khotso Mokoena OIB (born 6 March 1985) is a South African athlete who specializes in the long jump and triple jump.

== Early life and family ==
He started his school education at Shalimar Ridge Primary School in Heidelberg, Gauteng. He excelled at gymnastics at a very early age.

He matriculated at Nigel High School, Nigel. His talent at long jump was discovered by Elna de Beer. He started to compete in athletics at the age of 13.

== Career ==
Originally competing in the triple jump, winning the World Junior title in 2004 (he also came second in the long jump) and the silver medal at the 2006 Commonwealth Games, he switched to long jump in 2007 after an ankle injury. It was a very successful transition. In 2008, he won the long jump at the world indoor championships and silver at the Olympic games.

In July 2009, he set a new African record in long jump, 8.50m in Madrid in an IAAF Super Grand Prix meeting where he finished second behind Fabrice Lapierre. The previous African record, 8.46, was held by Cheikh Toure of Senegal and set in 1997.

For the 2014 Commonwealth Games, he switched back to the triple jump, winning the gold medal.

== Achievements ==
Year	Competition	Venue	Position	Event	Notes
Representing South Africa
2001	World Youth Championships	Debrecen, Hungary	5th	High jump	2.10 m
2002	World Junior Championships	Kingston, Jamaica	12th	Long jump	7.08 m (-0.7 m/s)
2003	All-Africa Games	Abuja, Nigeria	3rd	Long jump	7.83 m
2003	All-Africa Games	Abuja, Nigeria	2nd	Triple jump	16.28 m
2003	Afro-Asian Games	Hyderabad, India	3rd	Long jump	7.76 m
2003	Afro-Asian Games	Hyderabad, India	3rd	Triple jump	15.92 m
2004	World Junior Championships	Grosseto, Italy	2nd	Long jump	8.09 m (+0.7 m/s)
2004	World Junior Championships	Grosseto, Italy	1st	Triple jump	16.77 m (-0.3 m/s)
2006	World Indoor Championships	Moscow, Russia	5th	Long jump	8.01 m
2006	Commonwealth Games	Melbourne, Australia	4th	Long jump	8.04 m
2006	Commonwealth Games	Melbourne, Australia	2nd	Triple jump	16.95 m
2006	African Championships	Bambous, Mauritius	2nd	Long jump	8.45 m w
2006	African Championships	Bambous, Mauritius	2nd	Triple jump	16.67 m w
2007	All-Africa Games	Algiers, Algeria	3rd	Long jump	7.99 m
2007	World Championships	Osaka, Japan	5th	Long jump	8.19 m
2007	World Athletics Final	Stuttgart, Germany	3rd	Long jump	8.12 m
2008	World Indoor Championships	Valencia, Spain	1st	Long jump	8.08 m
2008	Olympic Games	Beijing, China	2nd	Long jump	8.24 m
2009	World Championships	Berlin, Germany	2nd	Long jump	8.47 m
2009	World Athletics Final	Thessaloniki, Greece	3rd	Long jump	8.17 m
2010	World Indoor Championships	Doha, Qatar	2nd	Long jump	8.08 m
2010	African Championships	Nairobi, Kenya	1st	Long jump	8.23 m
2014	Commonwealth Games	Glasgow, United Kingdom	1st	Triple jump	17.20 m
2014	African Championships	Marrakesh, Morocco	2nd	Long jump	8.02 m
2014	African Championships	Marrakesh, Morocco	1st	Triple jump	17.03 m
2015	World Championships	Beijing, China	13th (q)	Long jump	7.98 m
2015	World Championships	Beijing, China	9th	Triple jump	16.81 m
2016	African Championships	Durban, South Africa	3rd	Triple jump	16.77 m
2016	Olympic Games	Rio de Janeiro, Brazil	21st (q)	Triple jump	16.51 m
2018	World Indoor Championships	Birmingham, United Kingdom	14th	Long jump	7.53 m
2018	African Championships	Asaba, Nigeria	2nd	Triple jump	16.83 m

=== Personal bests ===
- Long jump – 8.50 m (2009)
- Triple jump – 17.35 m (2005) NR
- High jump – 2.10 m (2001)
