= Arnaud Casquette =

Mauritian long jumper (born 1978)

Personal information
- Nationality: Mauritian
- Born: 16 April 1978 (age 48) Mauritius

Sport
- Sport: Running
- Events: Long jump, Triple jump
Medal record
Men's athletics
Representing Mauritius
All Africa Games
Silver medal – second place	2007 Algiers	Long jump
African Athletics Championships
Silver medal – second place	2000 Algiers	4×100 m
Bronze medal – third place	2002 Radès	4×100 m
Francophone Games
Gold medal – first place	2001 Ottawa	4×100 m
Silver medal – second place	2001 Ottawa	Long jump
Indian Ocean Island Games
Gold medal – first place	2003 Reduit	Long jump
Gold medal – first place	2003 Reduit	4×100 m
Gold medal – first place	2007 Antananarivo	4×100 m
Silver medal – second place	2007 Antananarivo	Long Jump

Arnaud Casquette (born 16 April 1978) is a Mauritian long jumper.

He finished seventh at the 2002 Commonwealth Games and fifth at the 2006 African Championships. He won the silver medal at the 2007 All-Africa Games. He also competed at the IAAF World Championships in 2001 and 2007 as well as the Olympic Games in 1996 and 2000. He was qualified for the 2008 Olympics, but did not compete because of injury.

Casquette is considered one of the greatest high level sportsman that Mauritius has ever produced thanks to his successful competitive streak at the international level. He has participated in many international athletics competitions around the world and won numerous gold medals for Mauritius. He was trained at the HPTC (CIAD) in Dakar Senegal from 1999 to 2005 and then joined another high performance training centre in Malaysia for a few years before ending his career due to injury.

In 2001, he reached the World Championships semi-finals of the 4x100m relay in Edmonton, Canada and he currently holds the Mauritian record in the 4x100m relay with a time of 38.99 seconds, together with Stephan Buckland, Eric Milazar and Fernando Augustin. He also won a gold medal at the Francophone Games in Ottawa, Canada in the 4x100m relay event with Buckland, Milazar and Augustin. He was the former record holder in the long jump event for Mauritius. His personal best jump is 8.23 metres, achieved in July 2003 in Sestriere. The Mauritian record is currently held by Jonathan Chimier with 8.28 metres.

== Achievements ==
Year	Meeting	Venue	Result	Event	Extra
1998	Championnats Nationaux	Reduit, Mauritius	1st	Long Jump	7.53
1999	African Southern Regional Championships	Harare, Zimbabwe	1st	Long Jump	7.38
1999	AAFI-Salwan International Meeting	Delhi, India	1st	Long Jump	7.44
1999	Raja Bhalendra Singh International Meeting	Delhi, India	2nd	Long Jump	7.67
1999	Championnats Nationaux	Reduit, Mauritius	1st	Long Jump	7.70
1999	Lucozade International Sport Meeting	Reduit, Mauritius	3rd	Long Jump	7.57
1999	All Africa Games Athletics	Johannesburg, South Africa	4th	Long Jump Final	7.76
2000	KBC Night of Athletics	Heusden-Zolder, Belgium	3rd	Long Jump	7.55
2000	Meeting Atletica Citta di Formia	Formia, Italy	2nd	Long Jump	7.59
2000	Meeting Fédéral de Castres	Castres, France	6th	Long Jump	7.60
2000	Meeting de Luminy	Marseilles, France	3rd	Long Jump	7.80
2000	Meeting International Resisprint	La Chaux-de-Fonds, Switzerland	3rd	Long Jump	7.87
2000	Meeting National de Paris Charlety	Paris, Mauritius	1st	Long Jump	7.86
2000	Mauritius International Meeting	Reduit, Mauritius	1st	Long Jump	8.05
2000	Meeting Pre-Olympic Warmup	Sydney, Australia	1st	Long Jump	7.26
2000	Sydney Olympic Games	Sydney, Australia	18th	Long Jump Qualification	7.57
2001	Mauritius International Meeting	Reduit, Mauritius	2nd	Long Jump	7.52
2001	ABSA Series Meeting	Port Elizabeth, South Africa	2nd	Long Jump	7.42
2001	ABSA Series Meeting	Potchefstroom, South Africa	3rd	Long Jump	7.77
2001	Meeting National de Pierre Bénite	Pierre Bénite, France	6th	Long Jump	7.51
2001	Francophone Games	Ottawa, Canada	1st	Long Jump Qualification	7.68
2001	Francophone Games	Ottawa, Canada	2nd	Long Jump Final	7.88
2001	Francophone Games	Ottawa, Canada	1st	4 × 100 m Qualification	39.54
2001	Francophone Games	Ottawa, Canada	1st	4 × 100 m Final	39.04
2001	IAAF World Athletics Championships	Edmonton, Canada	12th	Long Jump Qualification	7.40
2001	Apres Midi Des Stars	Reduit, Mauritius	1st	Long Jump	7.55
2002	Meeting Atletica Maurina Olio Carli	Imperia, Italy	3rd	Long Jump	7.40
2002	Meeting AcrobalenoAtleticaEuropa	Celle Ligure, Italy	4th	Long Jump	7.47
2002	Meeting de Valbonne	Valbonne, France	2nd	Long Jump	7.50
2002	Meeting International Resisprint	La chaux-de-fonds, Switzerland	2nd	Long Jump	7.66
2002	Championnats Nationaux Vital	Reduit, Mauritius	1st	Long Jump	7.69
2002	Meeting EAP Altetica Geneve	Geneva, Switzerland	1st	Long Jump	7.77
2002	African Athletics Championships	Rades, Tunisia	6th	Long Jump Final	7.88
2002	African Athletics Championships	Rades, Tunisia	3rd	4 × 100 m Final	40.27
2002	Commonwealth Games	Manchester, England	6th	Long Jump Qualification	7.49
2002	Commonwealth Games	Manchester, England	7th	Long Jump Final	7.64
2003	Dakar Meeting (March 16)	Dakar, Senegal	1st	Long Jump	7.30
2003	Dakar Meeting (March 22)	Dakar, Senegal	1st	Long Jump	7.46
2003	Dakar Meeting (March 22)	Dakar, Senegal	1st	100m	10.75
2003	Preparation meet, CIAD Dakar	Dakar, Senegal	1st	Triple Jump	15.49
2003	Preparation meet, CIAD Dakar	Dakar, Senegal	2nd	150m	15.90
2003	Interrégionaux Ile de France Seniors	Évry Bondoufle, France	2nd	Long Jump	7.52
2003	Meeting Envol Trophée Pierre Bénite	Pierre Bénite, France	2nd	Long Jump	7.98
2003	Meeting Internazionale Sestriere	Sestriere, Italy	2nd	Long Jump	8.13
2003	Intersport Gugl-Meeting	Linz, Austria	6th	Long Jump	7.68
2003	Air Mauritius International Meeting	Reduit, Mauritius	1st	Long Jump	7.15
2003	Bamako International Meeting	Bamako, Mali	1st	Long Jump	7.70
2003	Meeting International Résisprint	La Chaux-de-Fonds, Switzerland	1st	Long Jump	7.92
2003	Jeux des Iles de L'ocean Indien	Reduit, Mauritius	1st	Long Jump Final	7.85
2003	All Africa Games	Abuja, Nigeria	7th	Long Jump	7.56
2004	Bamako AAC International Meeting	Bamako, Mali	3rd	Long Jump	7.55
2004	Dakar International Meeting	Dakar, Senegal	3rd	Long Jump	7.73
2004	Tunis AAC International Meeting	Rades, Tunisia	3rd	Long Jump Qualification	7.94
2004	Tunis AAC International Meeting	Rades, Tunisia	1st	Long Jump Final	7.70
2004	Algiers AAC Meeting	Algiers, Algeria	6th	Long Jump	7.70
2004	Skyline International Meeting	Reduit, Mauritius	1st	Long Jump	7.99
2004	Rhythm'N'Jump Meeting	Pierrelatte, France	2nd	Long Jump	7.84
2004	Meeting Internazionale Citta di Avellino	Avellino, Italy	2nd	Long Jump	7.73
2004	African Athletics Championships	Brazzaville, Congo	5th	Long Jump	7.65
2004	Meeting AcrobalenoAtleticaEuropa	Celle Ligure, Italy	3rd	Long Jump	7.67
2004	Meeting National à Thème de Pierre Bénite	Pierre Bénite, France	6th	Long Jump	7.62
2004	Critériums Nationaux des Spécialités	Toulouse, France	1st	Long Jump	8.15
2004	Meeting National D1 de Castres	Toulouse, France	1st	Long Jump	7.59
2004	Meeting Internazionale Sestriere	Sestriere, France	5th	Long Jump	7.95
2004	Meeting International Resisprint	La chaux-de-fonds, Switzerland	2nd	Long Jump	7.82
2005	Meeting National de Mondeville	Mondeville, France	3rd	Long Jump	7.40
2005	Governor Cup	Samara, Russia	5th	Long Jump	7.74
2005	Championnat Ile de France Indoor	Eaubonne, France	1st	Long Jump	7.58
2005	Meeting National de Reims	Reims, France	1st	Long Jump	7.47
2005	Interclubs Interregionale	Versailles, France	1st	Long Jump	7.66
2005	Interclubs Interregionale	Versailles, France	1st	100m	10.70
2005	Interclubs Poule Interregionale Classement	Versailles, France	1st	100m	10.86
2005	Interclubs Poule Interregionale Classement	Versailles, France	1st	Long Jump	7.75
2005	Championnats de l'Essonne CJES	Montgeron, France	1st	Long Jump	7.84
2005	Meeting AcrobalenoAtleticaEuropa	Celle Ligure, Italy	1st	Long Jump	7.83
2005	Meeting National D1 de Strasbourg	Strasbourg, France	1st	Long Jump	8.00
2005	Meeting Internazionale Sestriere	Sestriere, Italy	1st	Long Jump Qualification	7.99
2005	Meeting Internazionale Sestriere	Sestriere, Italy	1st	Long Jump Final	8.28
2005	Ouagadougou AAC Meeting	Ouagadougou, Burkina Faso	1st	Long Jump	7.99
2005	Ouagadougou AAC Meeting	Ouagadougou, Burkina Faso	2nd	100m	10.74
2005	Bamako AAC Permit Meeting	Bamako, Mali	2nd	Long Jump	7.85
2005	Dakar AAC Permit Meeting	Dakar, Senegal	2nd	Long Jump	8.08
2005	Championnats de France Elite	Angers, France	2nd	Long Jump	8.25
2005	Meeting National à Thème de Pierre Bénite	Pierre Bénite, France	2nd	Long Jump	8.12
2005	Meeting Vardinoyiannia EAP Permit	Rethymno, Greece	3rd	Long Jump	8.00
2005	Championnats de France Elite en salle	Lievin, France	3rd	Long Jump Qualification	7.60
2005	Championnats de France Elite en salle	Lievin, France	5th	Long Jump Final	7.53
2005	Meeting National D2 de Nantes	Nantes, France	4th	Long Jump	7.35
2005	Mauritius International Meeting	Reduit, Mauritius	4th	Long Jump	7.76
2005	2nd Meeting of Dakar League	Dakar, Senegal	3rd	150m	16.00
2005	Francophone Games	Niamey, Niger	3rd	Long Jump	7.76
2006	Match Reunion-Maurice Seniors D'athletisme	St Denis. Reunion	1st	Long Jump	7.28
2006	Match Reunion-Maurice Seniors D'athletisme	St Denis. Reunion	1st	Triple Jump	15.29
2006	African Athletics Championships	Bambous, Mauritius	5th	Long Jump	7.74
2007	Pahang Open Track & Field Meeting	Temerloh, Malaysia	1st	Long Jump	7.76
2007	Mauritius International Meeting	Reduit, Mauritius	1st	Long Jump	7.79
2007	Meeting de Paris Jean Bouin	Paris, France	2nd	Long Jump	7.81
2007	Jeux des Iles de L'ocean Indien	Antananarivo, Madagascar	2nd	Long Jump Final	7.85
2007	Jeux des Iles de L'ocean Indien	Antannarivo, Madagascar	1st	4 × 100 m Final	39.51
2007	All Africa Games	Algiers, Algeria	4th	Long Jump Qualification	7.86
2007	All Africa Games	Algiers, Algeria	2nd	Long Jump Final	8.03
2007	Algiers International Meeting	Algiers, Algeria	2nd	Long Jump	8.10
2007	IAAF World Athletics Championships	Osaka, Japan	8th	Long Jump Qualification	7.93
2008	IAAF World Indoor Championships	Valencia, Spain	19th	Long Jump Qualification	7.36
2008	Mauritius International Meeting	Reduit, Mauritius	1st	Long Jump	7.71
