= 2012 African Championships in Athletics – Men's triple jump =

The men's triple jump at the 2012 African Championships in Athletics was held at the Stade Charles de Gaulle on 30 June.

== Medalists ==
Gold	Tosin Oke; Nigeria
Silver	Issam Nima; Algeria
Bronze	Hugo Mamba-Schlick; Cameroon

== Records ==
Standing records prior to the 2012 African Championships in Athletics
World record	Jonathan Edwards (GBR)	18.29	Gothenburg, Sweden	7 August 1995
African record	Tarik Bouguetaïb (MAR)	17.37	Khémisset, Morocco	14 July 2007
Championship record	Andrew Owusu (GHA)	17.23	Dakar, Senegal	19 August 1998

== Schedule ==
Date	Time	Round
30 June 2012	16:00	Final

== Results ==
=== Final ===
Rank	Athlete	Nationality	#1	#2	#3	#5	#5	#6	Result	Notes
1st place, gold medalist(s)	Tosin Oke	Nigeria	16.21	15.59	16.54	16.74w	16.98	–	16.98	
2nd place, silver medalist(s)	Issam Nima	Algeria	16.37	15.62	x	16.30	16.69	16.69	16.69	
3rd place, bronze medalist(s)	Hugo Mamba-Schlick	Cameroon	16.25	16.07	14.77	16.01	16.08	16.34	16.34	
4	Tarik Bouguetaïb	Morocco	15.37w	16.19	16.02	15.97	x	16.29	16.29	
5	Elijah Kimitei	Kenya	15.79	15.77	16.04	16.28	15.68	16.26	16.28	
6	Roger Haitengi	Namibia	15.61	x	15.87	x	x	15.64	15.87	
7	Ammr Shouman	Egypt	15.55	15.81	15.58	15.76	15.66	15.73	15.81	
8	Mamadou Chérif Dia	Mali	14.59	15.69	15.64	15.48	15.09	x	15.69	
9	Sewa Sourou	Benin	15.01	15.46	15.50				15.50	
10	Tumelo Thagane	South Africa	14.56	x	15.21				15.21	
11	Jason Sewanyana	Uganda	15.04w	x	x				15.04w	
12	Romeo N'tia	Benin	x	x	14.93				14.93	
13	Ali Hasen	Libya	14.38	14.05	13.93				14.38	
	Diamama Mdamba	Republic of the Congo	x	x	x				NM	
	Tuan Wreh	Liberia							DNS	
