= 2014 African Championships in Athletics – Men's triple jump =

The men's triple jump event at the 2014 African Championships in Athletics was held August 12–13, 2014 on Stade de Marrakech.

== Medalists ==
| Gold | Silver | Bronze |
|---|---|---|
| Godfrey Khotso Mokoena; South Africa | Tosin Oke; Nigeria | Roger Haitengi; Namibia |

== Results ==
=== Qualification ===
Qualifying performance: 16.10 (Q) or 12 best performers (q) advanced to the Final.

| Rank | Group | Athlete | Nationality | #1 | #2 | #3 | Result | Notes |
|---|---|---|---|---|---|---|---|---|
| 1 | B | Issam Nima | Algeria | 16.27w | | | 16.27w | Q |
| 2 | A | Godfrey Khotso Mokoena | South Africa | x | 16.15 | | 16.15 | Q |
| 3 | B | Roger Haitengi | Namibia | 16.13 | | | 16.13 | Q |
| 4 | B | Tosin Oke | Nigeria | 15.94 | – | – | 15.94 | q |
| 5 | B | Mamadou Gueye | Senegal | 15.86 | 14.04 | – | 15.86 | q |
| 6 | A | Elijah Kimitei | Kenya | 15.78 | 15.66 | 15.24 | 15.78 | q |
| 7 | B | Hugo Mamba-Schlick | Cameroon | x | 15.75 | – | 15.75 | q |
| 8 | A | Olu Olamigoke | Nigeria | 15.60 | – | – | 15.60 | q |
| 9 | B | Tarik Bouguetaïb | Morocco | 15.52 | x | 15.20 | 15.52 | q |
| 10 | B | Abderrahim Zehouani | Morocco | 15.50 | 14.41 | 15.36 | 15.50 | q |
| 11 | B | Aude Damba Dianana | Republic of the Congo | 15.19 | 13.67 | 15.30 | 15.30 | q |
| 12 | A | Louahab Kafia | Algeria | 15.22 | x | x | 15.22 | q |
| 13 | A | Armand Tsoaoule | Cameroon | 14.96 | 15.05 | 14.91 | 15.05 | |
| 14 | A | Mohamed Rihani | Libya | 14.60 | 14.82 | 15.03 | 15.03 | |
| 15 | B | Getu Dekeba | Ethiopia | x | 14.60 | x | 14.60 | |
| 16 | B | Luis Dyangani Oko | Equatorial Guinea | 14.06 | 13.96 | 13.89 | 14.06 | |
| | A | Mamadou Cherif Dia | Mali | | | | DNS | |
| | A | Abdelkrim Mlaab | Morocco | | | | DNS | |

=== Final ===
| Rank | Athlete | Nationality | #1 | #2 | #3 | #4 | #5 | #6 | Result | Notes |
|---|---|---|---|---|---|---|---|---|---|---|
| 1st place, gold medalist(s) | Godfrey Khotso Mokoena | South Africa | 17.03 | x | 15.17 | 16.48w | – | 16.90w | 17.03 | |
| 2nd place, silver medalist(s) | Tosin Oke | Nigeria | 16.60 | 16.96 | x | 16.74 | 16.80w | 16.97 | 16.97 | |
| 3rd place, bronze medalist(s) | Roger Haitengi | Namibia | 16.37 | 16.45 | 16.05 | 16.42 | 16.56 | 16.72w | 16.72w | |
| 4 | Issam Nima | Algeria | 15.87 | 16.26w | 16.34 | 16.03 | 16.33 | 16.61w | 16.61w | |
| 5 | Hugo Mamba-Schlick | Cameroon | 16.36w | 16.24w | 16.11 | 14.55 | 16.10 | 16.21 | 16.36w | |
| 6 | Olu Olamigoke | Nigeria | 16.18 | 15.84 | – | 15.86 | – | – | 16.18w | |
| 7 | Mamadou Gueye | Senegal | x | 15.78 | 15.94w | 15.62 | 16.11 | 15.87 | 16.11 | |
| 8 | Tarik Bouguetaïb | Morocco | 15.88 | 14.33w | x | 14.70w | – | x | 15.88 | |
| 9 | Abderrahim Zehouani | Morocco | 14.72 | x | 15.49 | | | | 15.49 | |
| 10 | Louahab Kafia | Algeria | 15.27 | x | 15.36 | | | | 15.36 | |
| 11 | Elijah Kimitei | Kenya | 15.23 | – | – | | | | 15.23 | |
| 12 | Aude Damba Dianana | Republic of the Congo | x | x | 13.87 | | | | 13.87 | |
