= Athletics at the 2018 Commonwealth Games – Men's triple jump =

Men's triple jump at the 2018 Commonwealth Games
- Venue: Carrara Stadium
- Dates: 12 April (qualifying round); 14 April (final)
- Competitors: 20 from 18 nations
- Winning distance: 16.88 m

Medalists
gold medal	Troy Doris	Guyana
silver medal	Yordanys Durañona	Dominica
bronze medal	Marcel Mayack	Cameroon

The men's triple jump at the 2018 Commonwealth Games, part of the athletics programme, took place in the Carrara Stadium on 12 and 14 April 2018.

India's A.V. Rakesh Babu did not start the final as he was removed from the games after a needle was found in his possession, breaking games policy.

== Records ==
Prior to this competition, the existing world and Games records were as follows:

World record	Jonathan Edwards (GBR)	18.29 m	Gothenburg, Sweden	7 August 1995
Games record	Jonathan Edwards (ENG)	17.86 m	Manchester, England	28 July 2002

== Schedule ==
The schedule was as follows:

Date	Time	Round
Thursday 12 April 2018	10:30	Qualification
Saturday 14 April 2018	15:15	Final

All times are Australian Eastern Standard Time (UTC+10)

== Results ==
=== Qualifying round ===
Across two groups, those who jumped ≥16.60 m (Q) or at least the 12 best performers (q) advanced to the final.

Rank	Group	Name	#1	#2	#3	Result	Notes	Qual.
1	A	Yordanys Durañona (DMA)	16.75 -0.2 m/s			16.75		Q
2	B	Arpinder Singh (IND)	16.39 -0.5 m/s	16.16 +0.5 m/s	–	16.39		q
3	B	Roger Haitengi (NAM)	x +0.7 m/s	16.27 -0.1 m/s	16.36 +0.4 m/s	16.36		q
4	B	Muhammad Hakimi Ismail (MAS)	16.18 +0.1 m/s	16.21 -1.0 m/s	16.36 -0.9 m/s	16.36		q
5	A	Troy Doris (GUY)	16.33 -0.6 m/s	–	–	16.33		q
6	A	Marcel Mayack (CMR)	15.07 +0.8 m/s	16.02 +0.1 m/s	16.32 -0.5 m/s	16.32	PB	q
7	A	Nathan Douglas (ENG)	16.27 -0.5 m/s	x -0.5 m/s	–	16.27		q
8	B	Clive Pullen (JAM)	16.05 +1.3 m/s	x +0.9 m/s	16.15 -0.3 m/s	16.15		q
9	B	Jonathan Drack (MRI)	16.14 -1.3 m/s	x -1.1 m/s	15.76 -3.4 m/s	16.14		q
10	B	Jumonne Exeter (SVG)	16.09 -0.1 m/s	15.51 -1.4 m/s	15.51 -2.0 m/s	16.09	NR	q
11	B	Latario Collie-Minns (BAH)	15.83 -0.3 m/s	15.54 +0.6 m/s	15.98 -1.3 m/s	15.98		q
12	A	A.V. Rakesh Babu (IND)	15.98 -0.6 m/s	15.71 -0.3 m/s	x -0.5 m/s	15.98		q
13	A	Elijah Kimitei (KEN)	15.34 -1.2 m/s	15.58 -0.4 m/s	15.75 -0.3 m/s	15.75		
14	A	Goabaone Mosheleketi (BOT)	x +1.4 m/s	15.74 +1.1 m/s	13.86 -0.3 m/s	15.74		
15	A	Emmanuel Fakiye (AUS)	15.70; 0.0 m/s	x -1.2 m/s	x -0.3 m/s	15.70		
16	B	Eugene Vollmer (FIJ)	15.28 -0.9 m/s	15.32 -1.4 m/s	x -0.7 m/s	15.32	=SB	
17	B	Peniel Richard (PNG)	13.36 +0.6 m/s	14.58 -1.0 m/s	15.23 -0.2 m/s	15.23		
18	A	Brandon Jones (BIZ)	x 0.0 m/s	x +0.6 m/s	14.78 -3.5 m/s	14.78		
19	A	Anthony Mwanga (TAN)	13.97 +0.3 m/s	14.08 -2.1 m/s	14.22 +0.4 m/s	14.22		
–	B	Nathan Fox (ENG)				DNS		

=== Final ===
The medals were determined in the final.

Rank	Name	#1	#2	#3	#4	#5	#6	Result	Notes
1st place, gold medalist(s)	Troy Doris (GUY)	16.67 -1.2 m/s	16.88 +0.5 m/s	16.26 +0.4 m/s	x -0.1 m/s	–	x -1.5 m/s	16.88	SB
2nd place, silver medalist(s)	Yordanys Durañona (DMA)	16.86 -2.3 m/s	16.85 +0.3 m/s	16.77; 0.0 m/s	–	–	x -1.3 m/s	16.86	
3rd place, bronze medalist(s)	Marcel Mayack (CMR)	15.71 -2.2 m/s	16.17 -1.2 m/s	16.29 -0.3 m/s	15.69 -1.9 m/s	16.30 -1.1 m/s	16.80 -0.4 m/s	16.80	PB
4	Arpinder Singh (IND)	16.35 -1.1 m/s	x -1.0 m/s	x -2.0 m/s	16.46 -0.1 m/s	16.39 +0.2 m/s	15.98 -0.4 m/s	16.46	
5	Nathan Douglas (ENG)	16.35 -2.1 m/s	16.35 -0.8 m/s	x -0.3 m/s	x -0.4 m/s	x 0.0 m/s	x -1.6 m/s	16.35	
6	Jonathan Drack (MRI)	15.54 -1.5 m/s	16.25 -0.8 m/s	15.95; 0.0 m/s	15.77 -0.6 m/s	x -0.1 m/s	16.28 -0.3 m/s	16.28	
7	Clive Pullen (JAM)	x -1.8 m/s	x -0.6 m/s	16.16 -0.6 m/s	16.20 -0.1 m/s	x -0.8 m/s	16.25 -0.1 m/s	16.25	
8	Roger Haitengi (NAM)	16.24 -0.4 m/s	16.12 -1.1 m/s	x +1.2 m/s	15.85 -0.3 m/s	15.70 -0.9 m/s	15.38 -1.2 m/s	16.24	
9	Muhammad Hakimi Ismail (MAS)	15.77 -0.6 m/s	x 0.0 m/s	15.97 -0.1 m/s	—			15.97	
10	Jumonne Exeter (SVG)	15.22 -1.9 m/s	15.92 -0.5 m/s	x +0.8 m/s	—			15.92	
11	Latario Collie-Minns (BAH)	15.71 -0.7 m/s	x -1.0 m/s	15.90 +0.8 m/s	—			15.90	
–	A.V. Rakesh Babu (IND)				—			DNS	
