= 2024 African Championships in Athletics – Men's triple jump =

Men's triple jump at the 2024 African Championships in Athletics
- Venue: Japoma Stadium
- Location: Douala, Cameroon
- Dates: 25 June
- Competitors: 14 from 10 nations
- Winning distance: 17.18 m

Medalists
gold medal	Hugues Fabrice Zango	Burkina Faso
silver medal	Chengetayi Mapaya	Zimbabwe
bronze medal	Raymond Nkwemy Tchomfa	Cameroon

The men's triple jump event at the 2024 African Championships in Athletics was held on 25 June in Douala, Cameroon.

== Records ==
Records before the 2024 African Athletics Championships
Record	Athlete (nation)	Distance (m)	Location	Date
World record	Jonathan Edwards (GBR)	18.29	Gothenburg, Sweden	7 August 1995
African record	Hugues Fabrice Zango (BUR)	18.07	Aubière, France	16 January 2021
Championship record	Andrew Owusu (GHA)	17.23	Dakar, Senegal	19 August 1998
World leading	Jordan Díaz (ESP)	18.18	Rome, Italy	11 June 2024
African leading	Hugues Fabrice Zango (BUR)	17.53	Glasgow, United Kingdom	2 March 2024

== Results ==
Rank	Athlete	Nationality	#1	#2	#3	#4	#5	#6	Result	Notes
1st place, gold medalist(s)	Hugues Fabrice Zango	Burkina Faso	17.18	x	16.67	16.98	x	16.61	17.18	
2nd place, silver medalist(s)	Chengetayi Mapaya	Zimbabwe	16.87	16.70	16.43	16.30	x	x	16.87	
3rd place, bronze medalist(s)	Raymond Nkwemy Tchomfa	Cameroon	14.92	14.64	15.74	15.64	15.67	16.16	16.16	
4	Yoann Awhansou	Benin	15.11	15.64	16.07	15.70	15.69	16.12	16.12	
5	Amath Faye	Senegal	x	16.00	x	16.12	13.64	x	16.12	
6	Yacouba Loué	Burkina Faso	15.77	15.90	15.74	15.03	15.66	15.69	15.90	
7	Marcel Mayack	Cameroon	15.67	15.67	15.88	x	15.58	15.78	15.88	
8	Roger Haitengi	Namibia	15.56	15.28	15.13	x	15.49	x	15.56	
9	Kitchman Ujulu	Ethiopia	15.55	14.07	15.25				15.55	
10	Derick Gama	Cameroon	15.52	15.48	x				15.52	
11	Goodness Iredia	Nigeria	x	15.50	x				15.50	
12	Gilbert Pkemoi	Kenya	15.32	x	15.38				15.38	
13	Isaac Kirwa Yego	Kenya	14.73	15.23	15.19				15.23	
14	Charles Okello	Uganda	14.84	14.60	x				14.84	

== See also ==
- Athletics at the 2023 African Games – Men's triple jump
