= Athletics at the 2023 African Games – Men's long jump =

Men's long jump at the 2023 African Games
- Venue: Legon Sports Stadium
- Location: Accra, Ghana
- Dates: 21 March (qualification); 22 March (final)
- Competitors: 20 from 16 nations
- Winning distance: 7.86 m

Medalists
gold medal	Asande Mthembu	South Africa
silver medal	Yasser Triki	Algeria
bronze medal	Appolinaire Yinra	Cameroon

The men's long jump event at the 2023 African Games was held on 21 and 22 March 2024 in Accra, Ghana.

== Results ==
=== Qualification ===
Held on 21 March
Qualifying performance 7.80 (Q) or at least 12 best performers (q) advance to the final.

Rank	Group	Name	Nationality	#1	#2	#3	Result	Notes
1	A	Yasser Triki	Algeria	8.09			8.09	Q
2	A	Komi Bernard Konu	Togo	7.07	7.41	7.69	7.69	q
3	A	Edwin Kipmutai Too	Kenya	x	x	7.67	7.67	q
4	B	Appolinaire Yinra	Cameroon	7.64	x	x	7.64	q
5	A	Romeo N'tia	Benin	x	7.62w	7.52	7.62w	q
6	A	Emmanuel Njoku	Nigeria	7.51	7.60	x	7.60	q
7	A	Amath Faye	Senegal	7.56	5.31	x	7.56	q
8	B	Asande Mthembu	South Africa	7.33	7.55	x	7.55	q
9	A	Buli Melaku	Ethiopia	7.36	7.43w	7.52	7.52	q
10	A	Abraham Seaneke	Ghana	x	7.44	7.33	7.44	q
11	B	Yacouba Loue	Burkina Faso	7.20	7.30	x	7.30	q
12	A	Fredy Kevin Oyono	Cameroon	x	7.30w	7.01	7.30w	q
13	B	Thapelo Monaiwa	Botswana	7.10	7.29	7.25	7.29	
14	B	Al-Assane Fofana	Mali	6.90	7.11	7.28	7.28	
15	A	Soumaïla Sabo	Burkina Faso	7.13	6.88w	7.26	7.26	
16	B	Dhiae Boudoumi	Algeria	7.09	7.16	7.10	7.16	
17	A	Khoak Ayup	South Sudan	7.05	7.06w	7.06	7.06w	
18	B	Berhanu Mosisa	Ethiopia	5.64	7.01	6.47	7.01	
19	B	Archel Evrard Biniakounou	Republic of the Congo	x	6.65	x	6.65	
20	B	Braima Indjai	Guinea-Bissau	4.93	4.60	5.45	5.45	
	B	Chenoult Lionel Coetzee	Namibia				DNS	

=== Final ===
Held on 22 March

Rank	Name	Nationality	#1	#2	#3	#4	#5	#6	Result	Notes
1st place, gold medalist(s)	Asande Mthembu	South Africa	x	7.60	7.78	x	7.86	7.85	7.86	
2nd place, silver medalist(s)	Yasser Triki	Algeria	x	x	7.83w	x	x	x	7.83w	
3rd place, bronze medalist(s)	Appolinaire Yinra	Cameroon	7.71	x	5.21w	x	7.09w	7.28	7.71	
4	Edwin Kipmutai Too	Kenya	x	7.71w	x	x	x	x	7.71w	
5	Emmanuel Njoku	Nigeria	7.46w	x	7.66	7.50w	7.65	7.63	7.66	
6	Romeo N'tia	Benin	7.52	7.58	x	x	x	7.62	7.62	
7	Komi Bernard Konu	Togo	7.44	7.61	7.55	7.46w	7.54	7.54	7.61	
8	Buli Melaku	Ethiopia	x	7.23	7.61	7.30	x	7.48	7.61	
9	Amath Faye	Senegal	7.57	x	x				7.57	
10	Fredy Kevin Oyono	Cameroon	x	x	7.05w				7.05w	
11	Abraham Seaneke	Ghana	x	x	6.99				6.99	
	Yacouba Loue	Burkina Faso							DNS	
