= 2014 British Indoor Athletics Championships =

- Dates: 8-9 February
- Host city: Sheffield
- Venue: EIS Sheffield
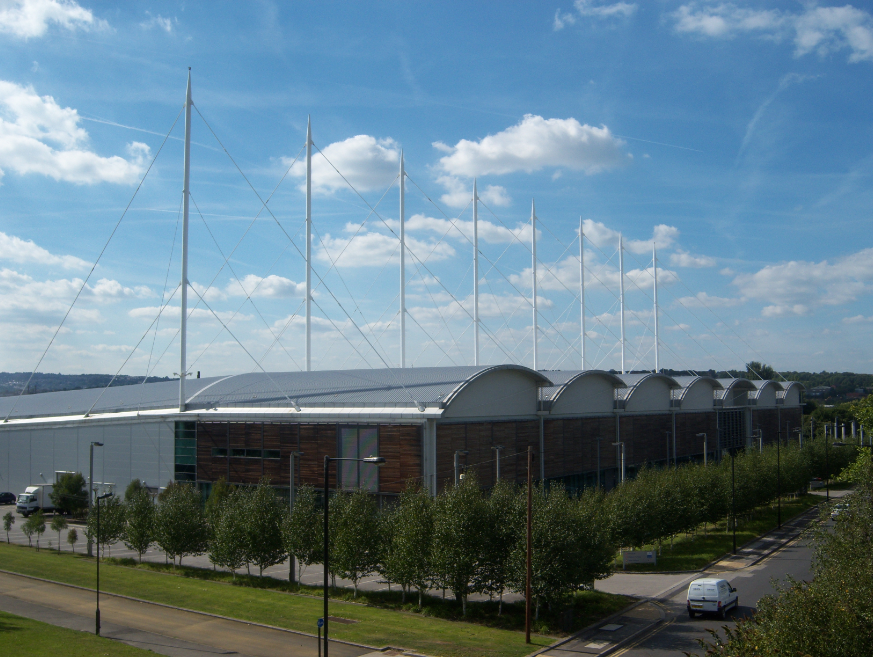
- Level: Senior national
- Type: Indoor
- Events: 24

The 2014 British Indoor Athletics Championships was an indoor track and field competition held from 8–9 February 2014 at the English Institute of Sport, Sheffield, England. A full range of indoor events were held.

At this event, Katarina Johnson-Thompson broke the women's British record in the high jump.

The event acted as the trials for the World Championships that year in Sopot, Poland.

== Medal summary ==
=== Men ===
Event	Gold		Silver		Bronze	
60 metres	James Dasaolu	6.50	Dwain Chambers	6.53	Richard Kilty	6.53
200 metres	Chris Clarke	20.68	Ryan Oswald	21.25	Conrad Williams	21.46
400 metres	Nigel Levine	46.82	Richard Buck	46.88	Daniel Awde	46.90
800 metres	Mukhtar Mohammed	1:51.61	Guy Learmonth	1:51.87	Paul Goodall	1:52.01
1500 metres	Lee Emanuel	3:48.15	Chris O'Hare	3:48.68	Charlie Grice	3:48.69
3000 metres	Andy Vernon	7:56.84	Jonathan Mellor	7:57.08	Tom Farrell	8:01.07
60 metres hurdles	Andrew Pozzi William Sharman	7.64	Not awarded		David Omoregie	7.78
High jump	Robbie Grabarz	2.24	Chris Baker	2.24	Allan Smith	2.24
Pole vault	Luke Cutts	5.60	Max Eaves	5.45	Paul Walker	5.30
Long jump	JJ Jegede	7.85	Dan Bramble	7.80	Felix Maisey-Curtis	7.63
Triple jump	Julian Reid	16.87	Nathan Fox	16.37	Daniel Lewis	16.31
Shot put	Zane Duquemin	18.31	Greg Beard	17.55	Jamie Williamson	16.94

=== Women ===
Event	Gold		Silver		Bronze	
60 metres	Asha Philip	7.09	Dina Asher-Smith	7.25	Montell Douglas	7.30
200 metres	Dina Asher-Smith	23.20	Shannon Hylton	23.24	Joey Duck	23.68
400 metres	Margaret Adeoye	52.77	Laura Wake	53.35	Meghan Beesley	53.38
800 metres	Laura Muir	2:06.04	Shelayna Oskan-Clarke	2:06.66	Katie Kirk	2:06.76
1500 metres	Jemma Simpson	4:14.68	Alison Leonard	4:14.76	Melissa Courtney	4:14.86
3000 metres	Charlene Thomas	9:05.93	Josephine Moultrie	9:09.02	Rosie Clarke	9:10.99
60 metres hurdles	Gemma Bennett	8.20	Serita Solomon	8.24	Sarah Lavin	8.25
High jump	Katarina Johnson-Thompson	1.96	Jayne Nisbet	1.87	Isobel Pooley	1.87
Pole vault	Holly Bradshaw	4.73	Lucy Bryan	4.26	Zoe Brown Sally Peake	4.16
Long jump	Katarina Johnson-Thompson	6.75	Jazmin Sawyers	6.44	Kelly Proper	6.38
Triple jump	Laura Samuel	13.32	Nadia Williams	13.27	Chioma Matthews	13.18
Shot put	Rachel Wallader	16.45	Sophie McKinna	16.13	Kirsty Yates	15.53
