= 2007 Lagos State indecency crackdown =

Nigerian arrests for indecency in personal dress

In the fall of 2007, the government of Lagos State under governor Babatunde Fashola initiated a police crackdown on public indecency in a personal dress based upon the state's dress code. It was carried out by state police commissioner Mohammed Abubakar, and resulted in the arrests of at least 90 women and 3 men. Their cases in court were defended by the Nigerian Bar Association (NBA) and officials of the Rural Women Empowerment and Development Network (RWEDN), and the police institution was criticized for misplacement of priorities, violation of women's rights, and the violation of human rights to expression.

The police responded by stating that the crackdown was initiated to combat female prostitution in the state.
