= Athletics at the 2019 African Games – Men's long jump =

The men's long jump event at the 2019 African Games was held on 28 and 30 August in Rabat.

== Medalists ==
| Gold | Silver | Bronze |
|---|---|---|
| Yasser Triki; Algeria | Marouane Kacimi; Morocco | Romeo N'tia; Benin |

== Results ==
=== Qualification ===
Qualifying performance 7.70 (Q) or 12 best performers (q) advanced to the final.

| Rank | Group | Athlete | Nationality | #1 | #2 | #3 | Result | Notes |
|---|---|---|---|---|---|---|---|---|
| 1 | A | Archel Evrard Biniakounou | Republic of the Congo | x | 7.95 | | 7.95 | Q, NR |
| 2 | A | Mohammed Abubakar | Ghana | 7.35 | x | 7.71 | 7.71 | Q |
| 3 | B | Jeff Hammond | Ghana | 7.66w | 7.65 | 7.63 | 7.66w | q |
| 4 | A | Omod Okugn | Ethiopia | 7.63 | x | 5.81 | 7.63 | q |
| 5 | A | Marouane Kacimi | Morocco | 7.58 | 7.61 | x | 7.61 | q |
| 6 | B | Isaac Kirwa Yego | Kenya | 7.44 | 7.46 | 7.59 | 7.59 | q |
| 7 | B | Chenault Lionel Coetzee | Namibia | 7.11 | 7.35 | 7.59 | 7.59 | q |
| 8 | A | Yasser Triki | Algeria | 7.55 | x | x | 7.55 | q |
| 9 | A | Romeo N'tia | Benin | 7.54 | 7.33 | x | 7.54 | q |
| 10 | A | Basem Mohamed Yehia Mohamed | Egypt | 6.99 | 7.48 | 6.93 | 7.48 | q |
| 11 | B | Raymond Nkwemy Tchomfa | Cameroon | 7.35 | 7.25 | 7.20 | 7.35 | q |
| 12 | A | Appolinaire Yinra | Cameroon | 7.00 | 7.28 | x | 7.28 | q |
| 13 | B | Lazare Simklina | Togo | 7.16 | 7.02 | 7.02w | 7.16 | |
| 14 | A | Bethwel Lagat | Kenya | x | x | 7.10 | 7.10 | |
| 15 | A | Marcel Mayack | Cameroon | 6.89 | 6.94 | – | 6.94 | |
| 16 | B | Beneni Ambese | Ethiopia | x | x | 6.92 | 6.92 | |
| 17 | B | Jonathan Drack | Mauritius | x | 6.71 | 6.68 | 6.71 | |
| 18 | A | Ndong Gregorio | Equatorial Guinea | 6.12 | 4.92 | 5.77 | 6.12 | |
| | B | Mouhcine Khoua | Morocco | x | x | x | NM | |
| | B | Yahya Berrabah | Morocco | | | | DNS | |
| | B | Dúdú Cruz | São Tomé and Príncipe | | | | DNS | |

=== Final ===
| Rank | Name | Nationality | #1 | #2 | #3 | #4 | #5 | #6 | Result | Notes |
|---|---|---|---|---|---|---|---|---|---|---|
| 1st place, gold medalist(s) | Yasser Triki | Algeria | x | x | 7.75 | 8.01 | x | x | 8.01 | |
| 2nd place, silver medalist(s) | Marouane Kacimi | Morocco | 7.47 | 7.71 | 7.79w | 5.76 | x | x | 7.79w | |
| 3rd place, bronze medalist(s) | Romeo N'tia | Benin | 7.72 | 7.72 | 7.59 | x | x | 5.50 | 7.72 | |
| 4 | Archel Evrard Biniakounou | Republic of the Congo | x | 7.60 | x | 7.31 | 7.56 | 7.71 | 7.71 | |
| 5 | Isaac Kirwa Yego | Kenya | 7.44 | 7.39 | 7.58 | 7.55 | 7.68 | 7.46 | 7.68 | |
| 6 | Raymond Nkwemy Tchomfa | Cameroon | 7.59 | 7.15 | 7.52 | 7.52 | 7.39 | 7.67 | 7.67 | |
| 7 | Omod Okugn | Ethiopia | x | 7.52w | 7.56 | 7.38 | 7.55 | x | 7.56 | |
| 8 | Mohammed Abubakar | Ghana | x | 7.44 | x | x | 7.49 | x | 7.49 | |
| 9 | Basem Mohamed Yehia Mohamed | Egypt | 7.26 | 7.33 | x | | | | 7.33 | |
| 10 | Jeff Hammond | Ghana | x | 6.94 | 7.27 | | | | 7.27 | |
| 11 | Chenault Lionel Coetzee | Namibia | 7.21 | 7.14 | 7.20 | | | | 7.21 | |
| 12 | Appolinaire Yinra | Cameroon | 6.81 | 7.02 | – | | | | 7.02 | |
