= 2010 African Championships in Athletics – Men's triple jump =

The men's triple jump at the 2010 African Championships in Athletics was held on July 31.

== Results ==
Rank	Athlete	Nationality	#1	#2	#3	#4	#5	#6	Result	Notes
1st place, gold medalist(s)	Tosin Oke	Nigeria	16.70	16.87	16.87	16.65	17.22	–	17.22	
2nd place, silver medalist(s)	Hugo Mamba-Schlick	Cameroon	16.61	16.58	16.77	16.52	16.78	16.74	16.78	SB
3rd place, bronze medalist(s)	Tumelo Thagane	South Africa	15.98	16.64	16.26	16.56	14.97	16.58	16.64	
4	Issam Nima	Algeria	X	16.50	15.81	16.18	16.13	X	16.50	SB
5	Mamadou Gueye	Senegal	15.80	16.24	X	16.13	16.19	15.79	16.24	SB
6	Tuan Wreh	Liberia	16.17	X	X	X	X	15.67	16.17	SB
7	Amr Salama Aly Shouman	Egypt	15.87	16.02	X	15.85	15.68	15.59	16.02	
8	Tarik Bouguetaïb	Morocco	X	15.93	15.92	X	15.82	14.06	15.93	
9	Tera Langat	Kenya	15.03	15.39	15.87				15.87	
10	Roger Haitengi	Namibia	X	15.27	15.55				15.55	
11	Thiery Adanabou	Burkina Faso	X	15.40	X				15.40	PB
12	Edwin Kimeli	Kenya	14.94	15.15	15.05				15.15	
13	Elijah Kimitei	Kenya	14.78	X	X				14.78	
14	Jude Sidonie	Seychelles	14.24	14.58	X				14.58	
15	Galwak Garkoth	Ethiopia	X	X	13.67				13.67	
	Renny Bijoux	Seychelles	X	X	X				NM	
	Derbew Tadesse	Ethiopia							DNS	
