= Athletics at the 2007 All-Africa Games – Men's triple jump =

The men's triple jump at the 2007 All-Africa Games was held on July 19.

== Results ==
Rank	Athlete	Nationality	Result	Notes
1st place, gold medalist(s)	Ndiss Kaba Badji	Senegal	16.80	
2nd place, silver medalist(s)	Hugo Mamba	Cameroon	16.61	NR
3rd place, bronze medalist(s)	Andrew Owusu	Ghana	16.32	
4	Tuan Wreh	Liberia	16.08	
5	Roger Haitengi	Namibia	15.94	
6	Sewa Sourou	Benin	15.69	
7	Tumelo Thagane	South Africa	15.56	
8	Relwende Kaboré	Burkina Faso	15.55	
9	Mouad Benchiki	Algeria	15.52	
10	Gui Bertrand Boissy	Senegal	14.92	
	Ngonidzashe Makusha	Zimbabwe	DNS	
