= Hugo Mamba-Schlick =

Cameroonian triple jumper

Medal record

Men's athletics

Representing Cameroon

All-Africa Games
Bronze medal – third place	2011 Maputo	Triple jump

African Championships
Silver medal – second place	2008 Addis Ababa	Triple jump
Silver medal – second place	2010 Nairobi	Triple jump
Bronze medal – third place	2012 Porto-Novo	Triple jump

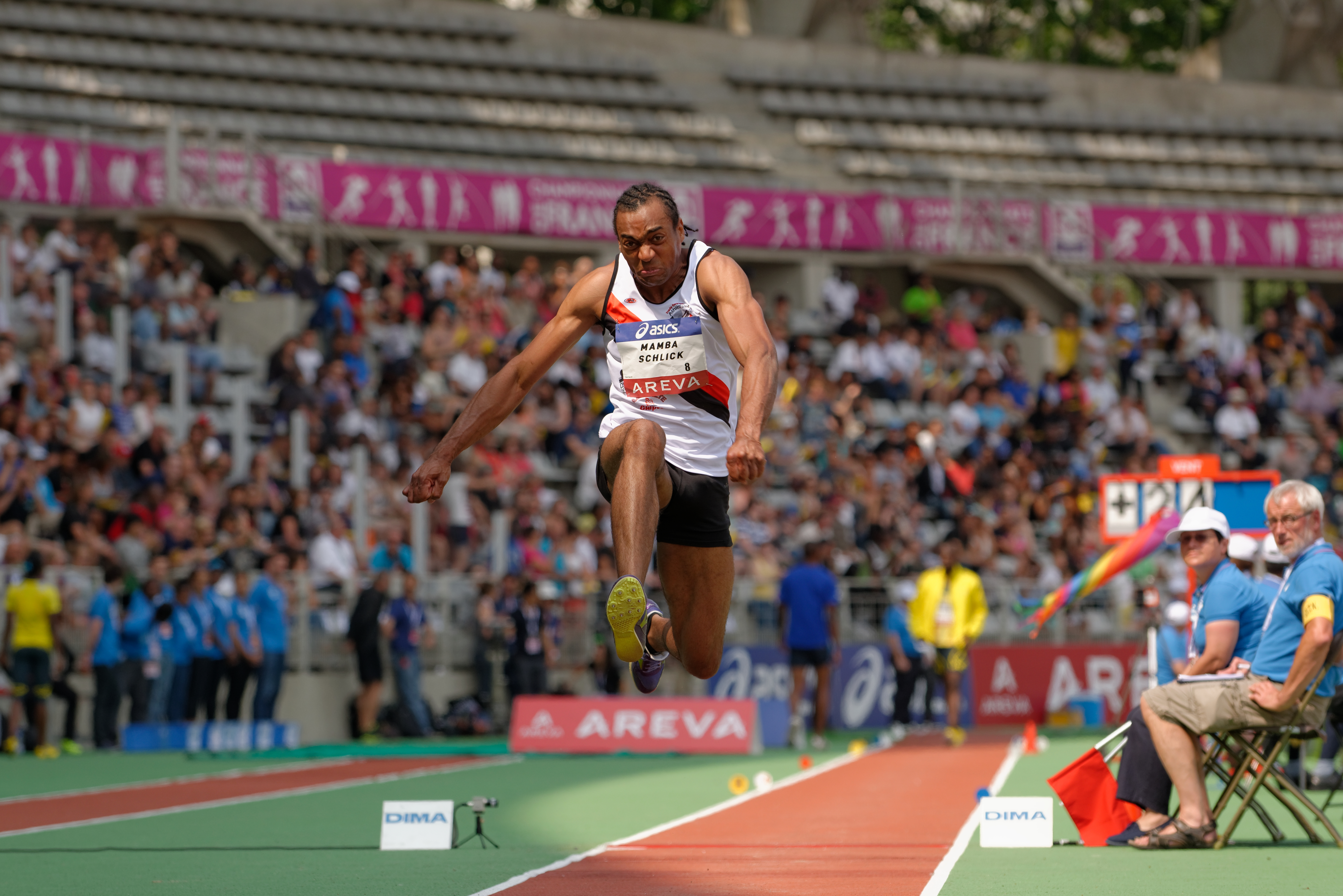
Mamba-Schlick in the men's triple jump final during the French Athletics Championships 2013 in Paris

Hugo Lucien Mamba-Schlick (born 1 February 1982) is a Cameroonian retired triple jumper.

He finished sixth at the 2006 African Championships won the silver medal at the 2007 All-Africa Games and won the silver medal at the 2008 African Championships in Athletics. He also competed at the 2007, 2009 and 2011 World Championships without reaching the final. In 2010 he won the silver medal at the Commonwealth Games in Delhi, in a new personal best jump of 17.14 metres. This is the current Cameroonian record.

== Competition record ==
Year	Competition	Venue	Position	Event	Notes
Representing Cameroon
2004	African Championships	Brazzaville, Republic of the Congo	9th	Long jump	6.73 m
2004	African Championships	Brazzaville, Republic of the Congo	5th	Triple jump	15.75 m
2006	African Championships	Bambous, Mauritius	5th	Triple jump	16.20 m
2007	All-Africa Games	Algiers, Algeria	2nd	Triple jump	16.61 m (NR)
2007	World Championships	Osaka, Japan	29th (q)	Triple jump	16.24 m
2008	African Championships	Addis Ababa, Ethiopia	2nd	Triple jump	16.92 m (NR)
2008	Olympic Games	Beijing, China	32nd (q)	Triple jump	16.01 m
2009	World Championships	Berlin, Germany	21st (q)	Triple jump	16.15 m
2009	Jeux de la Francophonie	Beirut, Lebanon	1st	Triple jump	16.78 m
2010	African Championships	Nairobi, Kenya	2nd	Triple jump	16.78 m
2010	Commonwealth Games	Delhi, India	2nd	Triple jump	17.14 m (NR)
2011	World Championships	Daegu, South Korea	21st (q)	Triple jump	16.15 m
2011	All-Africa Games	Maputo, Mozambique	3rd	Triple jump	16.17 m
2012	African Championships	Porto-Novo, Benin	3rd	Triple jump	16.34 m
2013	Jeux de la Francophonie	Nice, France	8th	Triple jump	16.15 m
2014	African Championships	Marrakesh, Morocco	5th	Triple jump	16.36 m (w)
