= Athletics at the 2017 Summer Universiade – Men's long jump =

The men's long jump event at the 2017 Summer Universiade was held on 27 and 28 August at the Taipei Municipal Stadium.

== Medalists ==
| Gold | Silver | Bronze |
|---|---|---|
| Radek Juška; Czech Republic | Yasser Triki; Algeria | Raihau Maiau; France |

== Results ==
=== Qualification ===
Qualification: 7.90 m (Q) or at least 12 best (q) qualified for the final.

| Rank | Group | Athlete | Nationality | #1 | #2 | #3 | Result | Notes |
|---|---|---|---|---|---|---|---|---|
| 1 | A | Radek Juška | Czech Republic | 7.15 | 7.77 | 8.31 | 8.31 | Q, PB |
| 2 | A | Lucas dos Santos | Brazil | 7.72 | 7.89 | – | 7.89 | q |
| 3 | A | Raihau Maiau | France | 7.52 | 7.62 | 7.72 | 7.72 | q |
| 4 | A | Joo Eun-jae | South Korea | 7.61 | x | 7.71w | 7.71w | q |
| 5 | A | Yasser Triki | Algeria | 7.71 | – | – | 7.71 | q |
| 6 | B | Marcel Mayack II | Cameroon | 7.44 | 7.34 | 7.69 | 7.69 | q, PB |
| 7 | B | Christopher Mitrevski | Australia | x | 7.49 | 7.66 | 7.66 | q |
| 8 | B | Filippo Randazzo | Italy | 7.58 | 7.55 | 7.64w | 7.64w | q |
| 9 | A | Ingar Kiplesund | Norway | 7.64 | 7.51 | x | 7.64 | q |
| 10 | A | Chan Ming Tai | Hong Kong | 7.64 | x | 7.24 | 7.64 | q |
| 11 | B | Tiago da Silva | Brazil | x | 7.55 | 7.63 | 7.63 | q |
| 12 | B | Strahinja Jovančević | Serbia | 7.63 | x | 7.42 | 7.63 | q |
| 13 | B | Kristian Pulli | Finland | 7.34 | 7.60 | 7.61 | 7.61 | |
| 14 | B | Daniel Gardiner | Great Britain | 7.59 | x | 7.58 | 7.59 | |
| 15 | B | Natsuki Yamakawa | Japan | 7.35 | x | 7.53 | 7.53 | |
| 16 | A | Henrik Kutberg | Estonia | x | 7.39 | 7.51 | 7.51 | |
| 17 | A | Kristian Bäck | Finland | 7.47 | 7.46 | 7.43w | 7.47 | |
| 18 | A | Sun Yize | China | 7.39 | x | 7.47 | 7.47 | |
| 19 | B | Lau Kin Hei | Hong Kong | 7.34 | 7.47 | x | 7.47 | |
| 20 | A | Liam Adcock | Australia | 7.45 | 7.15 | 7.43 | 7.45 | |
| 21 | A | Cheswill Johnson | South Africa | x | x | 7.40 | 7.40 | |
| 22 | A | Benjamin Gabrielsen | Denmark | 7.39 | 7.30w | 7.12w | 7.39 | |
| 23 | B | Alper Kulaksız | Turkey | 7.37 | x | 7.21 | 7.37 | |
| 24 | A | Steven Nuytinck | Netherlands | x | 7.14 | 7.36 | 7.36 | |
| 25 | A | Muhammed Anees Yahiya | India | 7.02 | x | 7.34w | 7.34w | |
| 26 | A | Alberto Álvarez | Mexico | x | 7.31 | 7.18 | 7.31 | |
| 27 | B | Ionuţ Andrei Neagoe | Romania | x | x | 7.30w | 7.30w | |
| 28 | B | Christopher Ullmann | Switzerland | x | 7.26 | 7.00 | 7.26 | |
| 29 | B | Oleksandr Rezanov | Ukraine | 7.19 | 7.16 | 6.94 | 7.19 | |
| 30 | A | Noval | Indonesia | x | 6.71 | 7.14w | 7.14w | |
| 31 | A | Corentin Campener | Belgium | 7.11 | x | x | 7.11 | |
| 32 | B | Stevens Dorcelus | Canada | 6.98 | x | 7.09 | 7.09 | |
| 33 | B | Francis Oketayot | Uganda | 7.00 | 6.73 | 6.82 | 7.00 | |
| 34 | B | Camilo Olivares | Chile | x | 6.84 | 6.96 | 6.96 | |
| 35 | B | O'Shea Wilson | United States | 6.84 | 6.90 | 6.93 | 6.93 | |
| 36 | A | Antwan Dickerson | United States | x | 6.90 | x | 6.90 | |
| 37 | B | Rogil Pablo | Philippines | 6.53 | 6.89 | 6.59 | 6.89 | PB |
| 38 | B | Khan Meng Linn | Singapore | 6.88 | 6.53 | 6.62 | 6.88 | |
| 39 | B | Pēteris Vīksne | Latvia | x | x | 6.74 | 6.74 | |
| 40 | A | Aristeo Dela Peña | Philippines | 6.71 | 6.36 | 6.13 | 6.71 | |
| 41 | B | Kaspar Arusalu | Estonia | x | x | 6.67w | 6.67w | |
| 42 | A | Jose Mariolla Ramananjatovo | Madagascar | x | 6.40 | 6.60w | 6.60w | |
| 43 | B | Hussain Al-Khalaf | Saudi Arabia | 6.60 | 6.12 | x | 6.60 | |
| 44 | A | Tam Chon Lok | Macau | 6.28 | 6.39 | 6.58w | 6.58w | |
| 45 | B | Lin Chia-hao | Chinese Taipei | x | 6.53 | 5.34w | 6.53 | |
| 46 | A | Ahmad Younis | Jordan | x | x | 6.51 | 6.51 | |
| 47 | B | Akhila Imantha Nilaweera | Sri Lanka | x | 6.48 | 5.91w | 6.48 | |
| 48 | B | Djafar Swedi | Democratic Republic of the Congo | x | 5.92 | 6.43 | 6.43 | |
| | A | Galolu Kankanamalage | Sri Lanka | x | x | x | NM | |
| | A | Julian Howard | Germany | x | x | x | NM | |
| | A | Lin Hung-min | Chinese Taipei | x | x | x | NM | |
| | B | Salim Saleh Al-Yarabi | Oman | x | x | x | NM | |
| | B | Bruce De Grilla Jr. | Bermuda | x | x | x | NM | |

=== Final ===
| Rank | Name | Nationality | #1 | #2 | #3 | #4 | #5 | #6 | Result | Notes |
|---|---|---|---|---|---|---|---|---|---|---|
| 1st place, gold medalist(s) | Radek Juška | Czech Republic | 7.54 | 7.95 | 8.02 | 7.75 | x | x | 8.02 | |
| 2nd place, silver medalist(s) | Yasser Triki | Algeria | 7.56 | 7.96 | x | 7.68 | 7.71 | x | 7.96 | |
| 3rd place, bronze medalist(s) | Raihau Maiau | France | 7.56 | 7.91 | 7.82 | 7.83 | 6.49 | 3.35 | 7.91 | |
| 4 | Christopher Mitrevski | Australia | 7.47 | 7.44 | 7.78 | 7.53 | 7.59 | 7.61 | 7.78 | |
| 5 | Tiago da Silva | Brazil | 7.64 | x | 7.50 | x | 7.46 | 2.75 | 7.64 | |
| 6 | Joo Eun-jae | South Korea | 7.57 | 7.56 | x | x | x | 7.57 | 7.57 | |
| 7 | Filippo Randazzo | Italy | x | 7.53 | x | x | 6.84 | – | 7.53 | |
| 8 | Strahinja Jovančević | Serbia | 7.52 | 7.41 | 7.28 | 7.30 | 7.52 | 7.28 | 7.52 | |
| 9 | Lucas dos Santos | Brazil | x | x | 7.50 | | | | 7.50 | |
| 10 | Marcel Mayack II | Cameroon | 6.51 | 7.27 | 7.48 | | | | 7.48 | |
| 11 | Chan Ming Tai | Hong Kong | x | 7.44 | 7.28 | | | | 7.44 | |
| 12 | Ingar Kiplesund | Norway | x | x | 7.15 | | | | 7.15 | |
