= Athletics at the 2019 African Games – Men's triple jump =

The men's triple jump event at the 2019 African Games was held on 27 August in Rabat.

== Results ==
Rank	Name	Nationality	#1	#2	#3	#4	#5	#6	Result	Notes
1st place, gold medalist(s)	Hugues Fabrice Zango	Burkina Faso	16.74	16.88	16.88	16.74	16.80w	x	16.88	
2nd place, silver medalist(s)	Yasser Triki	Algeria	16.54	16.57	16.48	x	16.42	16.71	16.71	
3rd place, bronze medalist(s)	Jonathan Drack	Mauritius	16.33	16.37	15.51	x	16.51	16.53	16.53	
4	Roger Haitengi	Namibia	15.78	15.91	16.20	16.30	15.99	16.33	16.33	
5	Mamadou Chérif Dia	Mali	x	16.14	16.05	16.12	x	x	16.14	
6	Raymond Nkwemy Tchomfa	Cameroon	15.10	15.72	15.76	16.03	15.53	15.99	16.03	
7	Marcel Richard Mayack	Cameroon	x	15.65	15.91	15.72	15.99w	15.89w	15.99	
8	Jean Claude Roamba	Burkina Faso	x	15.75	15.72w	x	15.55	15.52	15.75	
9	Isaac Kirwa Yego	Kenya	15.62	15.63	15.59				15.63	
10	Adire Gur	Ethiopia	14.96	15.32	15.32				15.32	
11	Mohamed Lamoni Drabo	Ivory Coast	14.84	14.70	14.72w				14.84	
12	Lazare Simklina	Togo	13.64	–	–				13.64	
	Hamza Mabchour	Morocco	x	x	x				NM	
	Elijah Kimitei	Kenya	x	–	–				NM	
	Thalosang Tshireletso	Botswana							DNS	
