= Ihemeje =

Ihemeje is a Nigerian surname. Notable people with the surname include:

- Emmanuel Ihemeje (born 1998), Italian athlete
