= 2016 African Championships in Athletics – Men's triple jump =

The men's triple jump event at the 2016 African Championships in Athletics was held on 23 June in Kings Park Stadium.

== Results ==
Rank	Athlete	Nationality	Result	Notes
1st place, gold medalist(s)	Tosin Oke	Nigeria	17.13	
2nd place, silver medalist(s)	Hugues Fabrice Zango	Burkina Faso	16.81	
3rd place, bronze medalist(s)	Godfrey Khotso Mokoena	South Africa	16.77	
4	Jonathan Drack	Mauritius	16.61	
5	Olumide Olamigoke	Nigeria	16.53	
6	Mamadou Chérif Dia	Mali	16.29	
7	Elijah Kimitei	Kenya	16.21	
8	Roger Haitengi	Namibia	16.20	
9	Menzi Mthembu	South Africa	15.95	
10	Mamadou Gueye	Senegal	15.86w	
11	Marouane El Aissaoui	Morocco	15.83	
12	Goabaone Mosheleketi	Botswana	15.72	
13	Bethwel Lagat	Kenya	15.66	
14	Bhekisisa Tshuma	Zimbabwe	15.19w	
15	Bienvenu Sawadogo	Burkina Faso	14.78	
