= Daniel Lewis (triple jumper) =

England & Jamaica international track & field athlete (born 1989)

Personal information
- Nationality: Great Britain
- Born: 8 November 1989 (age 36) London, England, United Kingdom
- Height: 1.80 m (5 ft 11 in)
- Weight: 77 kg (12 st 2 lb)

Sport
- Sport: Track and field
- Event: Triple Jump
- Club: Shaftesbury Barnet Harriers

Achievements and titles
- Personal best(s): Triple Jump(outdoor): 16.26 m (Bilbao, Spain 2014); Triple Jump(indoor): 16.31 m (Sheffield, United Kingdom 2014)

Daniel Lewis (born 8 November 1989) is a British athlete who specialises in the triple jump.

He competed at the 2014 Commonwealth Games representing Jamaica where he finished in 7th place with a leap of 16.17m.

As a youth he competed at the English Schools' Athletics Championships in both the long jump and triple jump becoming a 4-time medalist and 2-time Champion. As a senior he received his first England call up in 2014 and again in 2016

== Personal best(s) ==
- Triple Jump (indoor): 16.31m (Sheffield, U.K)
- Triple Jump (outdoor): 16.26m (Bilbao, Spain)

== International competitions ==
Year	Competition	Venue	Position	Event	Notes
Representing Jamaica
2014	Commonwealth Games	Glasgow, United Kingdom	7th	Triple jump	16.17 m

== National competitions ==
Year	Competition	Venue	Position	Event	Notes
Great Britain
2014	British Indoor Athletics Championships	Sheffield, United Kingdom	3rd	Triple jump	16.31 m
Jamaica
2014	Jamaican Senior Championships	Kingston, Jamaica	2nd	Triple jump	16.04 m
