= Olu Olamigoke =

Nigerian triple jumper

Olumide Olamigoke OLY
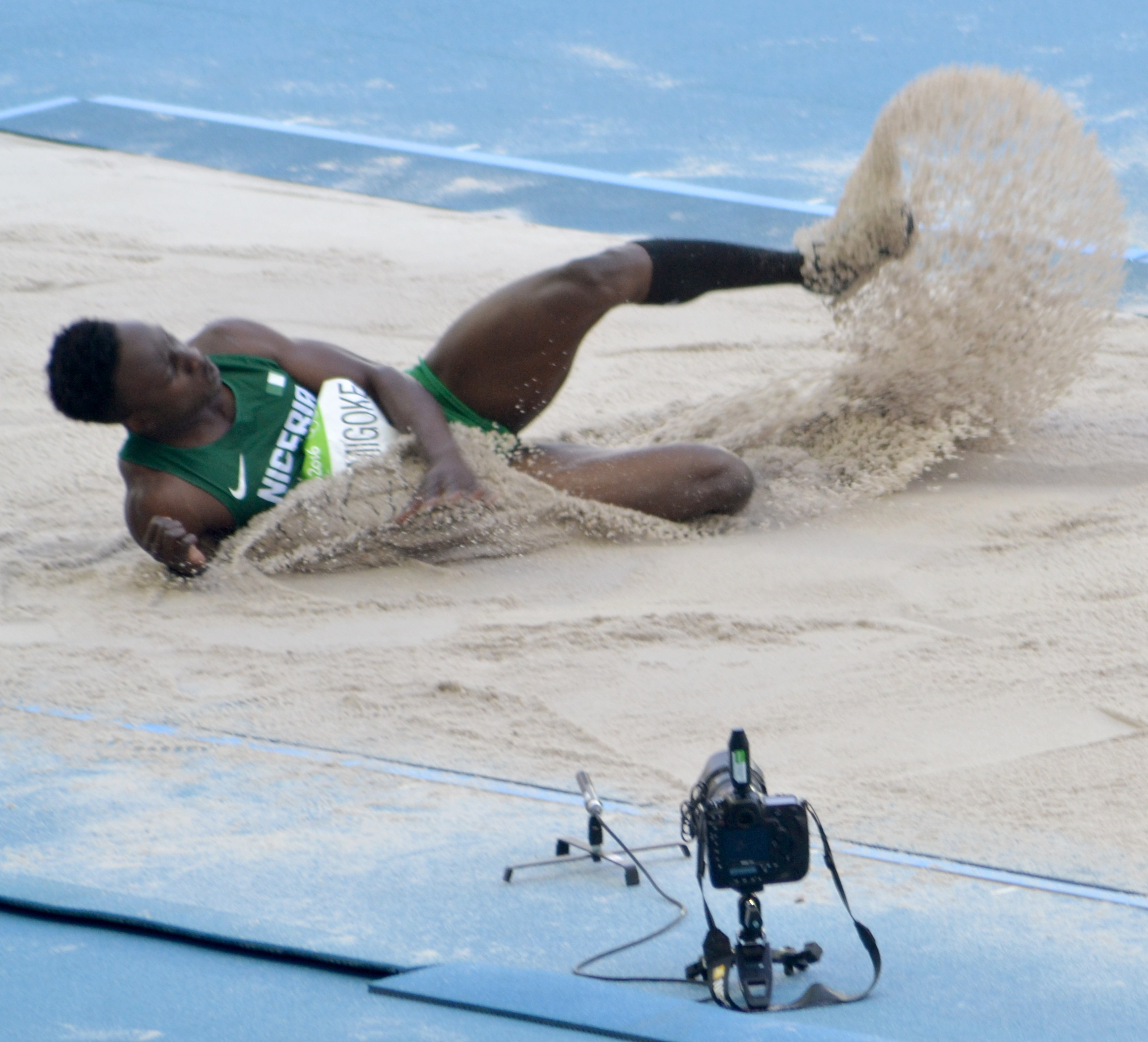
- Olamigoke at the 2016 Olympics

Personal information
- Born: September 19, 1990 (age 35) Stafford, Virginia, U.S.
- Education: Indiana University
- Height: 175 cm (5 ft 9 in)
- Weight: 72 kg (159 lb)

Sport
- Sport: Athletics
- Event: Triple jump
- College team: Indiana Hoosiers
- Coached by: Skeeter Jackson

Achievements and titles
- Personal best: 16.98 m (2015)
Medal record
Representing Nigeria
African Games
| Silver medal – second place | 2015 Brazzaville | Triple jump |

Olumide "Olu" Olamigoke (born September 19, 1990) is a Nigerian-American triple jumper who won a silver medal at the 2015 African Games. He was born in the United States to Nigerian parents, who immigrated there in 1986, and hence holds a dual Nigerian-American citizenship. He has a degree in human movement studies from Indiana University.

== Competition record ==
| Year | Competition | Venue | Position | Event | Notes |
Representing Nigeria
| 2014 | Commonwealth Games | Glasgow, United Kingdom | 4th | Triple jump | 16.56 m |
| 2014 | African Championships | Marrakesh, Morocco | 6th | Triple jump | 16.18 m |
| 2015 | African Games | Brazzaville, Republic of the Congo | 2nd | Triple jump | 16.98 m |
| 2016 | World Indoor Championships | Portland, United States | 14th | Triple jump | 15.94 m |
| 2016 | African Championships | Durban, South Africa | 5th | Triple jump | 16.53 m |
| 2016 | Olympic Games | Rio de Janeiro, Brazil | 32nd (q) | Triple jump | 16.10 m |
