= 2018 African Championships in Athletics – Men's long jump =

The men's long jump event at the 2018 African Championships in Athletics was held on 2 August in Asaba, Nigeria.

== Results ==
Rank	Athlete	Nationality	#1	#2	#3	#4	#5	#6	Result	Notes
1st place, gold medalist(s)	Ruswahl Samaai	South Africa	8.05	8.27	8.31	8.45	8.44	8.27	8.45	CR
2nd place, silver medalist(s)	Luvo Manyonga	South Africa	7.93	8.20	8.25w	8.43	8.42	8.36	8.43	
3rd place, bronze medalist(s)	Yahya Berrabah	Morocco	x	8.14w	8.09	x	x	x	8.14w	
4	Yasser Triki	Algeria	x	8.01	x	x	x	7.93	8.01	
5	Cheswill Johnson	South Africa	x	7.86w	7.49	7.68	5.06	x	7.86w	
6	Romeo N'Tia	Benin	7.65	7.76	x	x	x	x	7.76	
7	Lazare Simklina	Togo	7.71	4.99	x	x	x	x	7.71	
8	Marcel Mayack II	Cameroon	7.69w	7.51	–	–	–	–	7.69w	
9	Thierry Konan	Ivory Coast	7.46w	7.60	x				7.60	
10	Omod Okugn	Ethiopia	x	7.58	7.46				7.58	
11	Kiplagat Cherono	Kenya	7.48	7.51	7.46				7.51	
12	Mohcine Khoua	Morocco	x	7.49	x				7.49	
13	Appolinaire Yinra	Cameroon	7.47	7.32	7.28				7.47	
14	Benjamin Onyekwelu	Nigeria	7.41w	7.41w	7.31				7.41w	
15	Donard Nkwemy	Cameroon	6.38	7.03w	7.40				7.40	
16	Bethwel Lagat	Kenya	7.38	x	x				7.38	
17	Adir Gur	Ethiopia	7.34	x	x				7.34	
18	Archel Biniakounou	Republic of the Congo	6.81	x	7.11				7.11	
	Idrissa Compaore	Burkina Faso							DNS	
	Micheal Gwandu	Tanzania							DNS	
