= 2016 IAAF World Indoor Championships – Men's triple jump =

Men's triple jump at the 2016 IAAF World Indoor Championships
- Venue: Oregon Convention Center
- Dates: March 19
- Competitors: 16 from 12 nations
- Winning distance: 17.33

Medalists
gold medal	Dong Bin	China
silver medal	Max Hess	Germany
bronze medal	Benjamin Compaoré	France

The men's triple jump at the 2016 IAAF World Indoor Championships took place on March 19, 2016.

In the final, Dong Bin hit 17.18 on his first attempt, enough to win the competition. He later improved upon that with 17.29 in the third round and the ultimate winner 17.33 in the fifth. Benjamin Compaoré held down second place with a 16.77 in the first round, which he steadily improved three times. He looked to have enough for silver until Max Hess took his fourth attempt. On his last visit to Oregon, Hess hit a big personal best to get the World Junior silver medal. 20 months later, he hit another big personal best, a 59 cm (almost 2 feet) improvement to 17.14 to grab the silver. Hess jumped another 17.14 in the final round.

== Results ==
The final was started at 17:00.

Rank	Athlete	Nationality	#1	#2	#3	#4	#5	#6	Result	Notes
1st place, gold medalist(s)	Dong Bin	China	17.18	16.20	17.29	16.98	17.33	x	17.33	
2nd place, silver medalist(s)	Max Hess	Germany	16.25	16.37	x	17.14	x	17.14	17.14	PB
3rd place, bronze medalist(s)	Benjamin Compaoré	France	16.77	x	17.00	–	17.04	17.09	17.09	SB
4	Nelson Évora	Portugal	x	16.66	16.63	16.89	16.89	x	16.89	SB
5	Omar Craddock	United States	16.58	16.33	–	16.52	16.87		16.87	
6	Tosin Oke	Nigeria	16.73	16.65	x	x	16.64		16.73	SB
7	Pablo Torrijos	Spain	16.16	16.20	16.51	16.30	16.67		16.67	
8	Nazim Babayev	Azerbaijan	x	16.36	16.07	16.43	16.41		16.43	
9	Harold Correa	France	16.12	16.30	x				16.30	
10	Marian Oprea	Romania	16.05	15.98	16.27				16.27	
11	Chris Benard	United States	16.14	x	16.15				16.15	
12	Alphonso Jordan	United States	16.11	x	15.99				16.11	
13	Jonathan Drack	Mauritius	16.04	x	15.82				16.04	
14	Olu Olamigoke	Nigeria	13.73	15.59	15.94				15.94	SB
15	Roman Valiyev	Kazakhstan	x	15.54	x				15.54	
16	Yordanys Durañona	Dominica	15.27	x	–				15.27	SB
