= Troy Doris =

American triple jumper

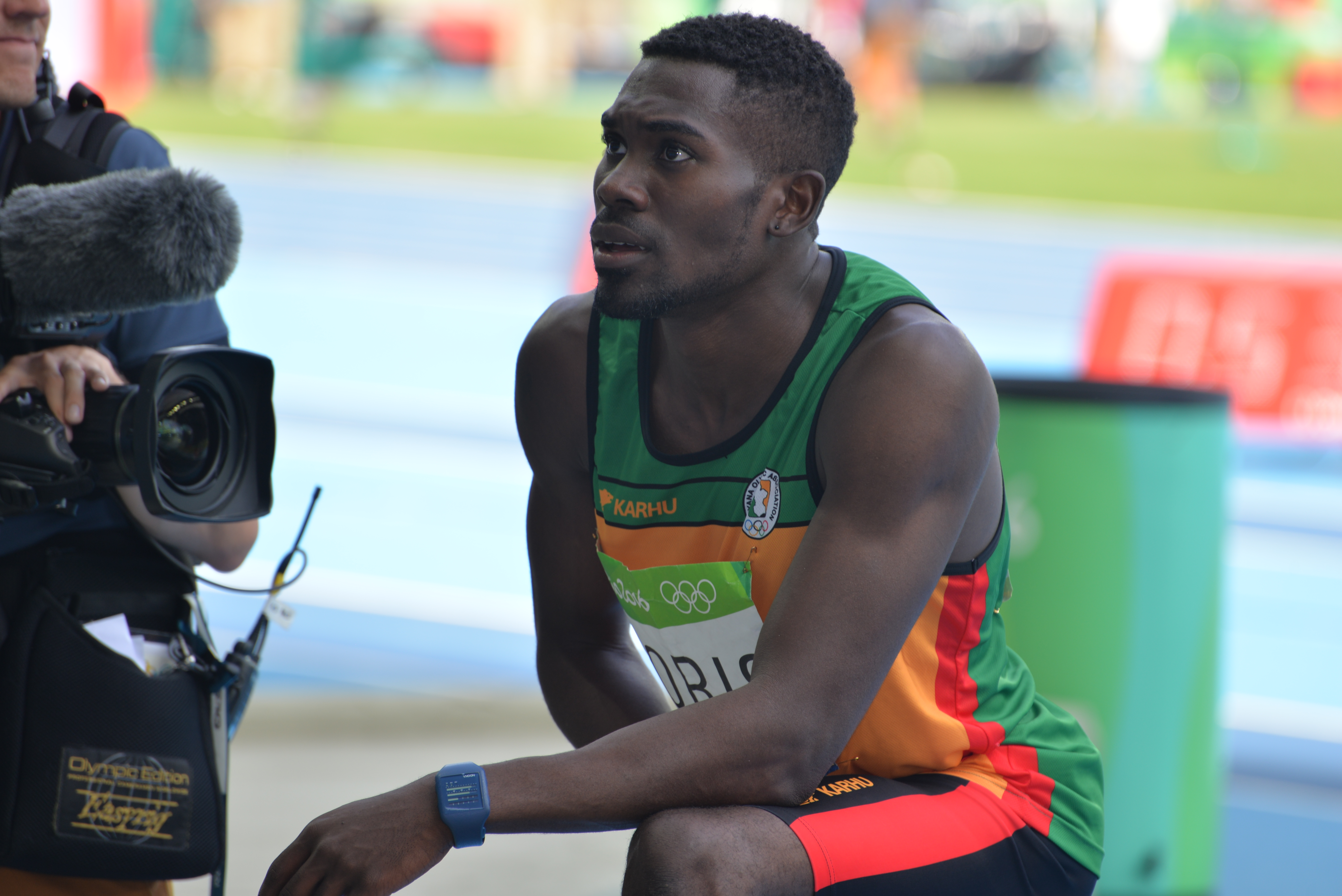
- Doris at the 2016 Summer Olympics

Personal information
- Born: April 12, 1989 (age 37) Chicago, Illinois, United States
- Height: 1.75 m (5 ft 9 in)
- Weight: 77 kg (170 lb)

Sport
- Country: Guyana
- Sport: Athletics
- Event: Triple jump
- College team: College of Dupage; Iowa
Medal record
Men's athletics
Representing Guyana
Commonwealth Games
Gold medal – first place	2018 Gold Coast	Triple jump
- Updated on 20:10, 15 April 2018 (UTC)

Troy Doris is an American triple jumper of Guyanese descent. He competed at the 2016 Rio de Janeiro Olympics. He finished seventh with a mark of 16.90 meters.

He was born in Chicago to Guyanese parents. He graduated from Bolingbrook High School in Bolingbrook, Illinois in 2007. Doris was a two-time junior college national champion at the College of DuPage before transferring to the University of Iowa. Before choosing to compete for Guyana, he placed eighth at the 2012 U.S. Olympic Trials in the triple jump.

Doris was Guyana's flag bearer at the 2016 Summer Olympics closing ceremony.

Doris won gold at the 2018 Commonwealth Games in triple jump.
