= Athletics at the 2011 All-Africa Games – Men's triple jump =

The men's triple jump event at the 2011 All-Africa Games was held on 12 September.

== Results ==
Rank	Athlete	Nationality	#1	#2	#3	#4	#5	#6	Result	Notes
1st place, gold medalist(s)	Tosin Oke	Nigeria	15.31	16.30	16.50	16.40	16.28	16.65	16.65	
2nd place, silver medalist(s)	Issam Nima	Algeria	x	15.94	16.54	16.34	16.54	16.42	16.54	
3rd place, bronze medalist(s)	Hugo Mamba-Schlick	Cameroon	x	15.41	16.17	15.80	15.99	x	16.17	
4	Seif El Islem Temacini	Algeria	15.85	16.10	15.32	x	15.47	15.57	16.10	
5	Tumelo Thagane	South Africa	15.81	15.92	x	15.65	15.67	15.49	15.92	
6	Mamadou Gueye	Senegal	15.81	15.78	15.31	–	15.06	–	15.81	
7	Afonso Zamdamela	Mozambique	15.54	15.72	15.54	15.42	15.60	15.46	15.72	
8	Tera Langat	Kenya	x	15.13	15.12	x	x	–	15.13	
9	Tuan Wreh	Liberia	15.10	x	15.10				15.10	
