= 2018 African Championships in Athletics – Men's triple jump =

The men's triple jump event at the 2018 African Championships in Athletics was held on 4 August in Asaba, Nigeria.

== Results ==
| Rank | Athlete | Nationality | #1 | #2 | #3 | #4 | #5 | #6 | Result | Notes |
|---|---|---|---|---|---|---|---|---|---|---|
| 1st place, gold medalist(s) | Hugues Fabrice Zango | Burkina Faso | 16.92 | 16.82 | x | 16.88 | 17.11 | x | 17.11 | NR |
| 2nd place, silver medalist(s) | Godfrey Khotso Mokoena | South Africa | x | 15.94 | 16.16 | 16.32 | 16.65 | 16.83 | 16.83 | |
| 3rd place, bronze medalist(s) | Yasser Triki | Algeria | 16.35 | 15.70 | 15.96 | 15.14 | 16.69 | 16.78 | 16.78 | |
| 4 | Mamadou Chérif Dia | Mali | 16.10 | x | 15.87 | x | 16.33 | 16.44 | 16.44 | |
| 5 | Jonathan Drack | Mauritius | 15.99 | 16.41 | x | x | x | 16.39 | 16.41 | |
| 6 | Marcel Mayack II | Cameroon | 15.80 | 16.17 | x | x | 16.40 | 16.12 | 16.40 | |
| 7 | Roger Haitengi | Namibia | 16.11 | 15.69 | x | x | x | x | 16.11 | |
| 8 | Ineh Emmanuel | Nigeria | 16.09 | 15.88 | x | – | – | – | 16.09 | |
| 9 | Isaac Kirwa Yego | Kenya | 15.71 | 15.93 | 15.91 | | | | 15.93 | |
| 10 | Adir Gur | Ethiopia | 14.92 | 15.27 | 15.50 | | | | 15.50 | |
| 11 | Amath Faye | Senegal | 15.40 | x | 15.18 | | | | 15.40 | |
| 12 | Menzi Mthembu | South Africa | 15.33 | x | 13.85 | | | | 15.33 | |
| 13 | Lazare Simklina | Togo | 14.60 | 15.02 | 14.59 | | | | 15.02 | |
| 14 | Raymond Nkwemy | Cameroon | 14.26 | 14.28 | 14.56 | | | | 14.56 | |
| 15 | Thierry Konan | Ivory Coast | x | 14.42 | x | | | | 14.42 | |
| | Lormans Mansiantima-Yitu | Democratic Republic of the Congo | | | | | | | DNS | |
| | Appolinaire Yinra | Cameroon | | | | | | | DNS | |
