= Marcel Mayack =

Cameroonian athlete (born 1990)

Personal information
- Full name: Marcel Richard Mayack II
- Nationality: Cameroonian
- Born: 17 November 1990 (age 35) Ebolowa
- Height: 1.80 m (5 ft 11 in)
- Weight: 88 kg (194 lb)

Sport
- Country: Cameroon
- Sport: Athletics
- Event: Triple jump

Achievements and titles
- Personal best: Triple jump: 16.80 m (2018)
Medal record
Representing Cameroon
Men's athletics
Commonwealth Games
Bronze medal – third place	2018 Gold Coast	Triple jump

Marcel Richard Mayack II (born 17 November 1990) is a Cameroonian male track and field athlete who competes in the triple jump. He was the bronze medallist at the 2018 Commonwealth Games, setting a personal best of 16.80 m (55 ft 1 1/4 in).

Born in Ebolowa, he studied science and animation technology at Cameroon's National Institute of Youth and Sports. he took up athletics in 2014 and represented Cameroon in three jumping events at both the 2015 and 2017 Summer Universiade. He placed tenth in the long and triple jump finals in 2017. At the Islamic Solidarity Games that year he was tenth in long jump and eleventh in triple jump. He also managed fifth in the long jump at the 2017 Jeux de la Francophonie.

== International competitions ==
Year	Competition	Venue	Position	Event	Notes
2015	Universaide	Gwangju, South Korea	19th (q)	High jump	2.00 m
2015	Universaide	Gwangju, South Korea	19th (q)	Long jump	7.28 m
2015	Universaide	Gwangju, South Korea	17th (q)	Triple jump	14.69 m
2017	Islamic Solidarity Games	Baku, Azerbaijan	10th	Long jump	7.20 m
2017	Islamic Solidarity Games	Baku, Azerbaijan	11th	Triple jump	15.28 m
2017	Jeux de la Francophonie	Abidjan, Ivory Coast	5th	Long jump	7.57 m
2017	Jeux de la Francophonie	Abidjan, Ivory Coast	9th	Triple jump	15.37 m
2017	Universaide	Taipei, Taiwan	19th (q)	High jump	2.05 m
2017	Universaide	Taipei, Taiwan	10th	Long jump	7.48 m
2017	Universaide	Taipei, Taiwan	10th	Triple jump	15.67 m
2018	Commonwealth Games	Gold Coast, Australia	11th	Long jump	7.70 m
2018	Commonwealth Games	Gold Coast, Australia	3rd	Triple jump	16.80 m
2018	African Championships	Asaba, Nigeria	8th	Long jump	7.69 m (w)
2018	African Championships	Asaba, Nigeria	6th	Triple jump	16.40 m
2019	African Games	Rabat, Morocco	15th (q)	Long jump	6.94 m
2019	African Games	Rabat, Morocco	7th	Triple jump	15.99 m
2023	Jeux de la Francophonie	Kinshasa, DR Congo	5th	High jump	1.95 m
2023	Jeux de la Francophonie	Kinshasa, DR Congo	6th	Triple jump	15.68 m
2024	African Championships	Douala, Cameroon	7th	Triple jump	15.88 m
