= Yasser Triki =

Algerian athlete (born 1997)

Yasser Triki OLY
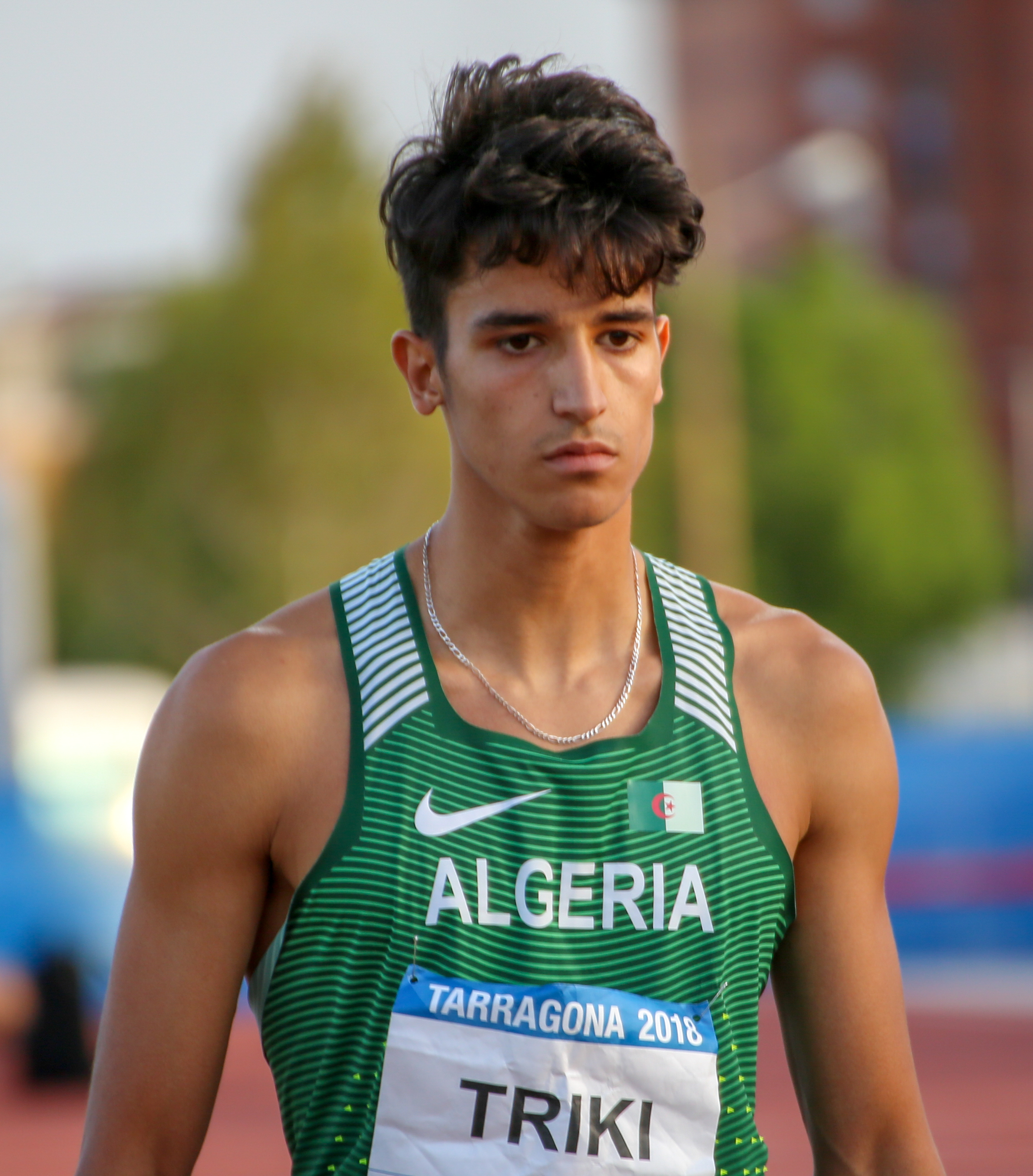
- Yasser Triki in 2018

Personal information
- Full name: Yasser Mohamed Tahar Triki
- Born: 24 March 1997 (age 29) Constantine, Algeria
- Education: University of Algiers 3 Texas A&M University
- Height: 1.93 m (6 ft 4 in)
- Weight: 80 kg (176 lb)

Sport
- Sport: Athletics
- Events: Long jump, Triple jump
- Coached by: Abdelkrim Ould Ahmed

Achievements and titles
- Personal best: Triple jump: 17.43 m NR (2021)
Medal record
Men's athletics
Representing Algeria
World Indoor Championships
Silver medal – second place	2024 Glasgow	Triple jump
Bronze medal – third place	2026 Toruń	Triple jump
Diamond League
Third place	2025	Triple jump
African Games
Gold medal – first place	2019 Rabat	Long jump
Silver medal – second place	2019 Rabat	Triple jump
Silver medal – second place	2023 Accra	Long jump
African Championships
Bronze medal – third place	2018 Asaba	Triple jump
Bronze medal – third place	2022 Saint Pierre	Triple jump
Mediterranean Games
Gold medal – first place	2022 Oran	Triple jump
Gold medal – first place	2026 Taranto	Triple jump
Silver medal – second place	2018 Tarragona	Long jump
Bronze medal – third place	2022 Oran	Long jump

Yasser Mohamed Tahar Triki, OLY (Arabic: ياسر تريكي; born 24 March 1997) is an Algerian athlete competing in the long jump and triple jump. He won the silver medal in the long jump at the 2017 Summer Universiade.

Triki broke the Algerian record in the triple jump with 17.31 meters achieved in Algiers meeting on 4 June 2021, thus qualifying to the 2020 Summer Olympics. In June 2021, he won the gold medals in both long jump and triple jump at the 2021 Arab Athletics Championships held in Tunis with jumps of 7.96 meters and 17.26 meters, respectively. On 7 July 2021, he improved his national record with a jump of 17.33 meters during the Gyulai István Memorial in Budapest

Triki also improved the Algerian indoor record in the triple jump several times. He first broke the existing record held by Lotfi Khaida set in Indianapolis in March 1992 with 16.49 meters before Triki broke this on 25 January 2019 in Texas with a jump of 16.52. This record was improved on 11 February 2019 in Texas with 17.00 meters before a new record was set a few days later in Fayetteville (North Carolina) on 23 February 2019 with a mark of 17.12 meters.

== International competitions ==
Year	Competition	Venue	Position	Event	Notes
Representing Algeria
2013	Arab Youth Championships	Cairo, Egypt	1st	Long jump	7.28 m
2013	Arab Youth Championships	Cairo, Egypt	1st	Triple jump	15.06 m
2013	World Youth Championships	Donetsk, Ukraine	7th	Long jump	7.32 m
2014	African Youth Games	Gaborone, Botswana	1st	Long jump	7.63 m
2014	African Youth Games	Gaborone, Botswana	3rd	Triple jump	15.23 m
2014	World Junior Championships	Eugene, United States	9th (q)	Long jump	7.35 m^{1}
2014	Youth Olympic Games	Nanjing, China	–	Long jump	NM
2015	African Junior Championships	Addis Ababa, Ethiopia	3rd	Long jump	7.39 m
2016	Arab Junior Championships	Tlemcen, Algeria	1st	Long jump	7.43 m
2016	Arab Junior Championships	Tlemcen, Algeria	1st	Triple jump	16.01 m
2016	World U20 Championships	Bydgoszcz, Poland	4th	Long jump	7.81 m
2017	Islamic Solidarity Games	Baku, Azerbaijan	14th	Long jump	6.86 m
2017	Islamic Solidarity Games	Baku, Azerbaijan	5th	Triple jump	16.14 m
2017	Arab Championships	Radès, Tunisia	1st	Long jump	7.83 m
2017	Arab Championships	Radès, Tunisia	1st	Triple jump	16.63 m
2017	Universiade	Taipei, Taiwan	2nd	Long jump	7.96 m
2017	Universiade	Taipei, Taiwan	5th	Triple jump	16.60 m
2018	Mediterranean Games	Tarragona, Spain	2nd	Long jump	8.01 m
2018	African Championships	Asaba, Nigeria	4th	Long jump	8.01 m
2018	African Championships	Asaba, Nigeria	3rd	Triple jump	16.78 m
2019	Arab Championships	Cairo, Egypt	2nd	Long jump	7.97 m
2019	Arab Championships	Cairo, Egypt	1st	Triple jump	16.50 m
2019	African Games	Rabat, Morocco	1st	Long jump	8.01 m
2019	African Games	Rabat, Morocco	2nd	Triple jump	16.71 m
2019	World Championships	Doha, Qatar	20th (q)	Triple jump	16.62 m
2021	Arab Championships	Radès, Tunisia	1st	Long jump	7.96 m
2021	Arab Championships	Radès, Tunisia	1st	Triple jump	17.26 m
2021	Olympic Games	Tokyo, Japan	5th	Triple jump	17.43 m
2022	World Indoor Championships	Belgrade, Serbia	10th	Triple jump	16.42 m
2022	African Championships	Port Louis, Mauritius	3rd	Triple jump	16.58 m (w)
2022	Mediterranean Games	Oran, Algeria	3rd	Long jump	7.80 m
2022	Mediterranean Games	Oran, Algeria	1st	Triple jump	17.07 m
2023	Arab Games	Oran, Algeria	1st	Long jump	7.83 m
2023	Arab Games	Oran, Algeria	1st	Triple jump	17.30 m
2023	World Championships	Budapest, Hungary	5th	Triple jump	17.01 m
2024	World Indoor Championships	Glasgow, United Kingdom	2nd	Triple jump	17.35 m
2024	African Games	Accra, Ghana	2nd	Long jump	7.83 m (w)
2024	Olympic Games	Paris, France	9th	Triple jump	17.22 m
2025	Arab Championships	Oran, Algeria	1st	Triple jump	16.84 m
2025	Diamond League	Zurich, Switzerland	3rd	Triple jump	17.42 m
2025	World Championships	Tokyo, Japan	4th	Triple jump	17.25 m
2026	World Indoor Championships	Toruń, Poland	3rd	Triple jump	17.30 m
2026	Mediterranean Games	Taranto, Italy	1st	Triple jump	16.97 m

^{1}Did not start in the final

== Personal bests ==
Outdoor

- Long jump – 8m09 (+1.6 m/s, University of Ghana Sport Stadium, Accra (GHA) 2019)
- Triple jump – 17m43 (+1.0 m/s, Tokyo Olympic Stadium, Tokyo (JPN, 5 August 2021, a national record)

Indoor

- Long jump – 7.69 (College Station, Texas 2018)
- Triple jump – 17.35 (Glasgow, 2 March 2024, NR)

Olympic Games
Preceded by Amel Melih; Mohamed Flissi	Flag bearer for Algeria; Paris 2024 with Amina Belkadi	Succeeded by Incumbent
