= Athletics at the 2015 African Games – Men's triple jump =

The men's triple jump event at the 2015 African Games was held on 14 September.

== Results ==
Rank	Name	Nationality	#1	#2	#3	#4	#5	#6	Result	Notes
1st place, gold medalist(s)	Tosin Oke	Nigeria	16.44	16.69	17.00	x	x	x	17.00	
2nd place, silver medalist(s)	Olumide Olamigoke	Nigeria	16.73	16.60	16.98	16.54	16.58	x	16.98	
3rd place, bronze medalist(s)	Mamadou Chérif Dia	Mali	x	16.29	16.55	15.96	x	x	16.55	NR
4	Roger Haitengi	Namibia	16.12	16.37	x	16.40	x	16.20	16.40	
5	Fabrice Zango	Burkina Faso	15.81	x	15.95	16.28	16.36	16.12	16.36	
6	Louhab Kafia	Algeria	15.33	16.06	x	14.76	15.85	15.59	16.06	
7	Elijah Kimitei	Kenya	15.49	15.92	15.50	14.83	–	–	15.92	
8	Andrew Issaka	Republic of the Congo	15.91	x	x	x	x	14.68	15.91	NR
9	Vincent Okot	Uganda	15.28	15.47	15.56				15.56	
10	Tera Langat	Kenya	14.67	15.36	14.92				15.36	
11	Aude Damba Diamana	Republic of the Congo	x	14.97	15.29				15.29	
12	Armand Tsoaoule	Cameroon	14.62	15.13	15.21				15.21	
	Kiplagat Ruto	Kenya	x	x	x				NM	
	Tesfaye Nedesa	Ethiopia							DNS	
	Godfrey Khotso Mokoena	South Africa							DNS	
