= Burkina Faso at the 2022 World Athletics Championships =

- Flag of Burkina Faso
- WA code: BUR

in Eugene, United States 15 July 2022 – 24 July 2022
- Competitors: 2 (1 man and 1 woman)
- Medals Ranked 33rd: Gold 0 Silver 1 Bronze 0 Total 1

World Athletics Championships appearances
- 1983; 1987; 1991; 1993; 1995; 1997; 1999; 2001; 2003; 2005; 2007; 2009; 2011; 2013; 2015; 2017; 2019; 2022; 2023

Burkina Faso competed at the 2022 World Athletics Championships in Eugene, United States, from 15 to 24 July 2022.

== Medalists ==
Medal	Athlete	Event	Date
Silver	Hugues Fabrice Zango	Men's triple jump	July 23

== Results ==
Burkina Faso has entered 2 athletes.

Key

- Q = Qualified for the next round
- q = Qualified for the next round as a fastest loser or, in field events, by position without achieving the qualifying target
- NR = National record
- PB = Personal best
- SB = Season best
- N/A = Round not applicable for the event

=== Men ===
Field events

Athlete	Event	Qualification		Final	
Athlete	Event	Distance	Position	Distance	Position
Hugues Fabrice Zango	Triple jump	17.15	2 Q	17.55	2nd place, silver medalist(s)

=== Women ===
Field events

Athlete	Event	Qualification		Final	
Athlete	Event	Distance	Position	Distance	Position
Marthe Koala	Long jump	DNS		Did not qualify	
