= Burkina Faso at the 2023 World Athletics Championships =

- Flag of Burkina Faso
- WA code: BUR

in Budapest, Hungary 19 August 2023 – 27 August 2023
- Competitors: 2 (1 man and 1 woman)
- Medals Ranked 6th: Gold 1 Silver 0 Bronze 0 Total 1

World Athletics Championships appearances
- 1983; 1987; 1991; 1993; 1995; 1997; 1999; 2001; 2003; 2005; 2007; 2009; 2011; 2013; 2015; 2017; 2019; 2022; 2023

Burkina Faso competed at the 2023 World Athletics Championships in Budapest, Hungary, from 19 to 27 August 2023.

== Medalists ==
Medal	Athlete	Event	Date
Gold	Hugues Fabrice Zango	Men's triple jump	August 21

== Results ==
Burkina Faso entered 2 athletes.

Key

- Q = Qualified for the next round
- q = Qualified for the next round as a fastest loser or, in field events, by position without achieving the qualifying target
- NR = National record
- PB = Personal best
- SB = Season best
- N/A = Round not applicable for the event

=== Men ===
Field events

Athlete	Event	Qualification		Final	
Athlete	Event	Distance	Position	Distance	Position
Hugues Fabrice Zango	Triple jump	17.12	4 q	17.64	1st place, gold medalist(s)

=== Women ===
Field events

Athlete	Event	Qualification		Final	
Athlete	Event	Distance	Position	Distance	Position
Marthe Koala	Long jump	6.84	2 Q	6.68	7
