= Athletics at the 2014 Commonwealth Games – Men's triple jump =

Men's triple jump at the Commonwealth Games

The Men's triple jump at the 2014 Commonwealth Games as part of the athletics programme took place at Hampden Park on 1 and 2 August 2014.

== Results ==
=== Qualifying round ===
Rank	Group	Name	#1	#2	#3	Result	Notes
1	A	Tosin Oke (NGR)	16.75			16.75	Q/SB
2	B	Phillips Idowu (ENG)	16.70			16.70	Q
3	B	Khotso Mokoena (RSA)	16.69			16.69	Q/SB
4	A	Arpinder Singh (IND)	x	x	16.51	16.51	Q
5	B	Olu Olamigoke (NGR)	16.46			16.46	Q
6	A	Nathan Fox (ENG)	16.17	16.01	–	16.17	q
7	A	Daniel Lewis (JAM)	16.17	15.85	–	16.17	q
8	B	Jonathan Drack (MRI)	x	16.13	–	16.13	q/=PB
9	B	Nathan Douglas (ENG)	15.88	16.05	–	16.05	q
10	B	Yordanys Durañona (DMA)	15.51	15.67	16.05	16.05	q
11	A	Damon McLean (JAM)	15.90	15.91	15.70	15.91	q
12	A	Elijah Kiplagat Kimitei (KEN)	15.48	15.84	15.56	15.84	q
13	A	Eugene Vollmer (FIJ)	15.52	15.79	x	15.79	SB
14	B	Wayne Northover (JAM)	15.50	15.45	x	15.50	
15	B	Lamar Delaney (BAH)	14.91	15.31	15.43	15.43	
16	A	Brandon Jones (BIZ)	15.23	x	15.37	15.37	
17	A	Lathone Collie-Minns (BAH)	x	x	15.03	15.03	
18	B	Gervais Tsoaoule Mpazambe (CMR)	13.75	14.66	14.93	14.93	
19	A	Boitu Baiteke (KIR)	12.97	12.68	13.21	13.21	
	B	Isaac Yego (KEN)	x	x	x	NM	

=== Final ===
Rank	Name	#1	#2	#3	#4	#5	#6	Result	Notes
1st place, gold medalist(s)	Khotso Mokoena (RSA)	x	17.20	16.99	–	–	x	17.20	SB
2nd place, silver medalist(s)	Tosin Oke (NGR)	x	16.84	x	x	x	x	16.84	SB
3rd place, bronze medalist(s)	Arpinder Singh (IND)	16.63	16.46	16.39	16.09	x	x	16.63	
4	Olu Olamigoke (NGR)	16.56	16.24	x	15.76	16.24	x	16.56	
5	Phillips Idowu (ENG)	x	16.45	x	x	x	x	16.45	
6	Nathan Fox (ENG)	15.56	x	–	15.66	16.26	x	16.26	
7	Daniel Lewis (JAM)	x	16.09	–	15.91	x	15.55	16.09	
8	Yordanys Durañona (DMA)	15.81	15.66	15.08	13.74	–	15.57	15.81	
9	Elijah Kiplagat Kimitei (KEN)	15.45	15.21	13.81				15.45	
10	Damon McLean (JAM)	x	x	15.38				15.38	
11	Nathan Douglas (ENG)	x	14.56	–				14.56	
	Jonathan Drack (MRI)							DNS	
