= Tumelo Thagane =

South African triple jumper

Personal information
- Born: 3 July 1984 (age 41) Ratanda, South Africa

Sport
- Country: South Africa
- Sport: Athletics
- Event: Triple jump
Medal record
Men's athletics
Representing South Africa
African Championships
Bronze medal – third place	2010 Nairobi	Triple jump

Tumelo Thagane (born 3 July 1984) is a South African athlete specialising in the triple jump. He represented his country at the World Championships without recording a valid jump. In addition, he won the bronze at the 2010 African Championships.

His personal best in the event is 17.09 metres (+1.9) set in Durban in 2010.

== Competition record ==
Year	Competition	Venue	Position	Event	Notes
Representing South Africa
2007	Universiade	Bangkok, Thailand	20th (q)	Triple jump	15.54 m
2007	All-Africa Games	Algiers, Algeria	7th	Triple jump	15.56 m
2008	African Championships	Addis Ababa, Ethiopia	6th	Triple jump	15.86 m
2009	Universiade	Belgrade, Serbia	20th (q)	Triple jump	15.68 m
2010	African Championships	Nairobi, Kenya	3rd	Triple jump	16.64 m
2011	Universiade	Shenzhen, China	16th (q)	Triple jump	15.89 m
2011	World Championships	Daegu, South Korea	–	Triple jump	NM
2011	All-Africa Games	Maputo, Mozambique	5th	Triple jump	15.92 m
2012	African Championships	Porto-Novo, Benin	10th	Triple jump	15.21 m
