= Roger Haitengi =

Namibian triple jumper (born 1983)

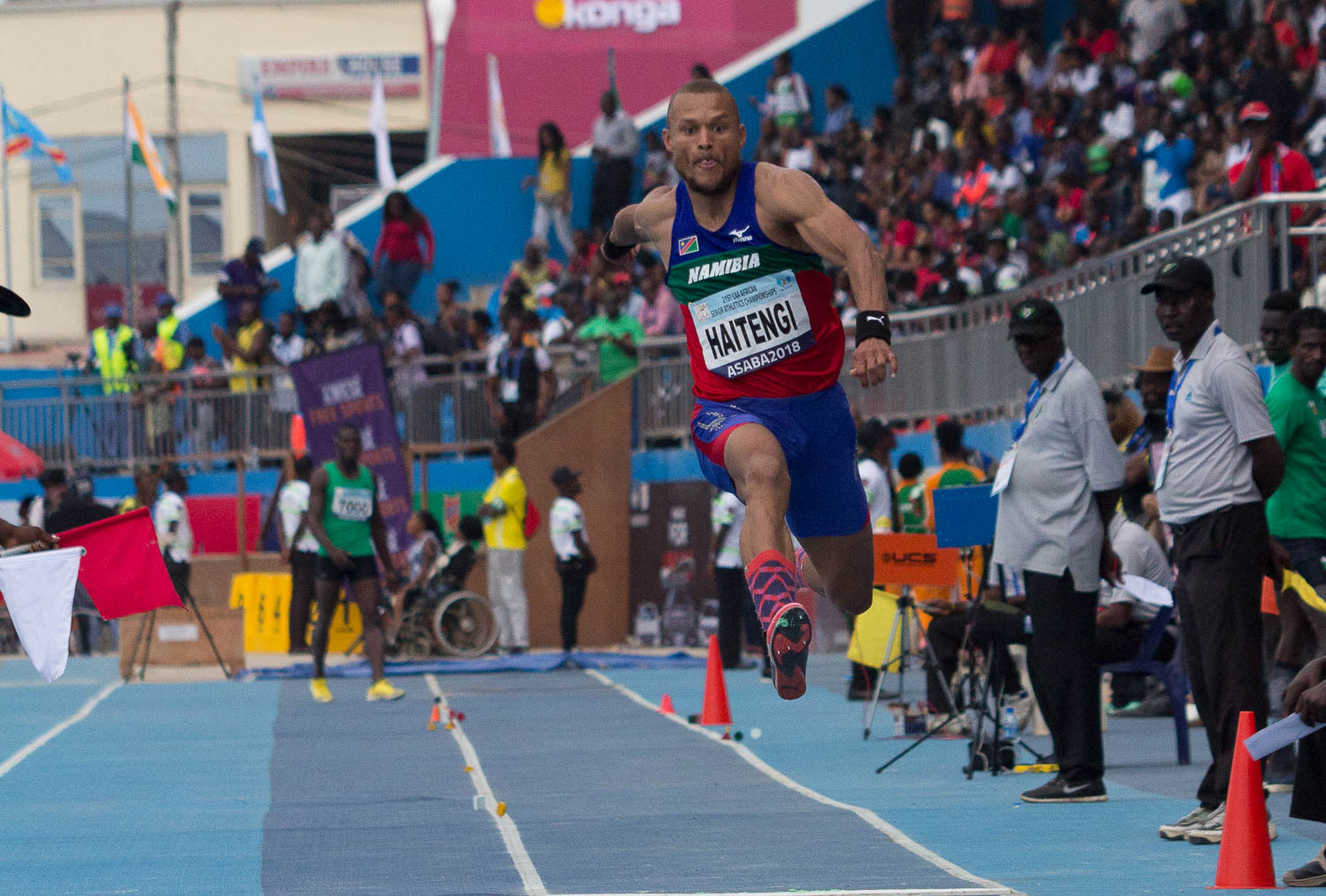
- Roger Haitengi at the 2018 African Athletics Championships

Personal information
- Nationality: Namibia
- Born: 12 September 1983 (age 42)

Sport
- Sport: Athletics
- Event: Triple Jump
Medal record
Men's athletics
Representing Namibia
African Championships
Bronze medal – third place	2014 Marrakesh	Triple jump
- Updated on 27 August 2016

Roger Nikanor Haitengi (born 12 September 1983) is a Namibian athlete specialising in the triple jump. He won his first major medal, a bronze, at the 2014 African Championships.

His personal best in the event is 16.74 metres, set in Windhoek in 2010. This is the current national record.

== Competition record ==
Year	Competition	Venue	Position	Event	Notes
Representing Namibia
2005	Universiade	İzmir, Turkey	13th (h)	4 × 100 m relay	41.18 s
2005	Universiade	İzmir, Turkey	14th	Triple jump	14.84 m
2006	African Championships	Bambous, Mauritius	8th	Triple jump	15.76 m (w)
2007	All-Africa Games	Algiers, Algeria	5th	Triple jump	15.94 m
2007	Universiade	Bangkok, Thailand	9th	Triple jump	15.91 m
2008	African Championships	Addis Ababa, Ethiopia	7th	Triple jump	15.84 m
2009	Universiade	Belgrade, Serbia	16th (q)	Triple jump	15.84 m
2010	African Championships	Nairobi, Kenya	10th	Triple jump	15.55 m
2012	African Championships	Porto-Novo, Benin	6th	Triple jump	15.87 m
2014	African Championships	Marrakesh, Morocco	3rd	Triple jump	16.72 m (w)
2015	African Games	Brazzaville, Republic of the Congo	4th	Triple jump	16.40 m
2016	African Championships	Durban, South Africa	8th	Triple jump	16.20 m
2018	Commonwealth Games	Gold Coast, Australia	8th	Triple jump	16.24 m
2018	African Championships	Asaba, Nigeria	7th	Triple jump	16.11 m
2019	African Games	Rabat, Morocco	4th	Triple jump	16.33 m
2022	African Championships	Port Louis, Mauritius	12th	Triple jump	15.45 m (w)
2024	African Championships	Douala, Cameroon	8th	Triple jump	15.56 m
