= Burkina Faso at the 2019 World Athletics Championships =

- WA code: BUR

in Doha, Qatar 27 September 2019 – 6 October 2019
- Competitors: 3 in 3 events
- Medals Ranked 31st: Gold 0 Silver 0 Bronze 1 Total 1

World Athletics Championships appearances
- 1983; 1987; 1991; 1993; 1995; 1997; 1999; 2001; 2003; 2005; 2007; 2009; 2011; 2013; 2015; 2017; 2019; 2022; 2023

Burkina Faso competed at the 2019 World Athletics Championships in Doha, Qatar, from 27 September to 6 October 2019.

== Medalists ==
| Medal | Name | Event | Date |
|---|---|---|---|
| Bronze | Hugues Fabrice Zango | Men's triple jump | 29 September |

== Results ==
Key

- Q = Qualified for the next round
- q = Qualified for the next round as a fastest loser or, in field events, by position without achieving the qualifying target
- NR = National record
- PB = Personal best
- SB = Season best
- N/A = Round not applicable for the event

=== Men ===
Track and road events

| Athlete | Event | Heat | | Semifinal | | Final | |
| Athlete | Event | Result | Rank | Result | Rank | Result | Rank |
|---|---|---|---|---|---|---|---|
| Bienvenu Sawadogo | 400 metres hurdles | DQ | – | Did not advance | | | |

Field events

| Athlete | Event | Qualification | | Final | |
| Athlete | Event | Distance | Position | Distance | Position |
|---|---|---|---|---|---|
| Hugues Fabrice Zango | Triple jump | 17.17 | 2 Q | 17.66 AR | 3rd place, bronze medalist(s) |

=== Women ===
Combined events – Heptathlon

| Athlete | Event | 100H | HJ | SP | 200 m | LJ | JT | 800 m | Final | Rank |
|---|---|---|---|---|---|---|---|---|---|---|
| Marthe Koala | Result | 13.05 NR | 1.74 | 13.28 SB | 24.29 | 6.44 | 37.59 | DNS | DNF | – |
| Marthe Koala | Points | 1117 | 903 | 746 | 953 | 988 | 621 | – | DNF | – |
