= 2008 African Championships in Athletics – Men's triple jump =

The men's triple jump event at the 2008 African Championships in Athletics was held at the Addis Ababa Stadium on May 1.

== Results ==
| Rank | Athlete | Nationality | #1 | #2 | #3 | #4 | #5 | #6 | Result | Notes |
|---|---|---|---|---|---|---|---|---|---|---|
| 1st place, gold medalist(s) | Ndiss Kaba Badji | Senegal | 17.07 | 16.99 | 16.90 | x | – | 16.46 | 17.07 | NR |
| 2nd place, silver medalist(s) | Hugo Mamba-Schlick | Cameroon | 16.48 | 16.92 | 16.86 | 16.75 | – | 15.28 | 16.92 | NR |
| 3rd place, bronze medalist(s) | Tarik Bouguetaïb | Morocco | 16.82 | x | ? | ? | ? | ? | 16.82 | |
| 4 | Nour Eldinn | Egypt | 16.05 | x | x | x | ? | ? | 16.05 | |
| 5 | Hassan Bazzine | Morocco | 15.71 | 15.99 | x | 15.93 | 16.04 | x | 16.04 | |
| 6 | Tumelo Thagane | South Africa | x | 15.49 | 15.86 | 15.75 | x | – | 15.86 | |
| 7 | Roger Haitengi | Namibia | 15.35 | 15.14 | 15.84 | x | 13.49 | 15.28 | 15.84 | |
| 8 | Silas Katonon | Kenya | 15.76 | 15.63 | 15.39 | 14.84 | 15.37 | 13.73 | 15.76 | |
| 9 | Relwende Kaboré | Burkina Faso | 15.64 | 15.30 | 15.59 | | | | 15.64 | |
| 10 | Galwake Galcote | Ethiopia | 14.82 | 14.74 | x | | | | 14.82 | |
| 11 | Derebew Tadesse | Ethiopia | 13.56 | 13.53 | 13.82 | | | | 13.82 | |
| | Larona Koosimile | Botswana | | | | | | | DNS | |
| | Andrew Owusu | Ghana | | | | | | | DNS | |
