= 2006 African Championships in Athletics – Men's triple jump =

The men's triple jump event at the 2006 African Championships in Athletics was held at the Stade Germain Comarmond on August 12.

== Results ==
Rank	Name	Nationality	#1	#2	#3	#4	#5	#6	Result	Notes
1st place, gold medalist(s)	Tarik Bouguetaïb	Morocco	17.08w	16.83	17.25w	16.83	16.72	–	17.25w	
2nd place, silver medalist(s)	Godfrey Khotso Mokoena	South Africa	16.13	16.67w	14.53	16.58w	16.59w	16.35	16.67w	
3rd place, bronze medalist(s)	Younès Moudrik	Morocco	14.11w	16.34w	16.36w	16.58w	16.28w	15.35w	16.58w	
4	Tuan Wreh	Liberia	16.35w	14.63w	x	x	x	x	16.35w	
5	Hugo Mamba-Schlick	Cameroon	16.14	x	x	16.12	16.20	x	16.20	
6	Akotia Tchalla	Togo	14.90	16.06w	15.49	15.52	–	15.47	16.06w	
7	Yahya Berrabah	Morocco	15.50	x	15.69	–	–	15.85	15.85	
8	Roger Haitengi	Namibia	15.71w	15.76w	x	13.87	x	13.84	15.76w	
