= Tuan Wreh =

Liberian triple jumper

Tuan Wreh (born 23 November 1979) is a retired Liberian triple jumper.

Wreh was an All-American jumper for the Penn Quakers track and field team in the NCAA. He later became an assistant coach for the team.

He finished seventh at the 2002 African Championships, fourth at the 2006 African Championships, fourth at the 2007 All-Africa Games, sixth at the 2010 African Championships and ninth at the 2011 All-Africa Games. In the long jump, he finished eleventh at the 2002 African Championships.

His personal best jump is 16.65 metres, achieved in June 2008 in New York. He holds the Liberian record.
