= Jonathan Drack =

Mauritian athlete (born 1988)

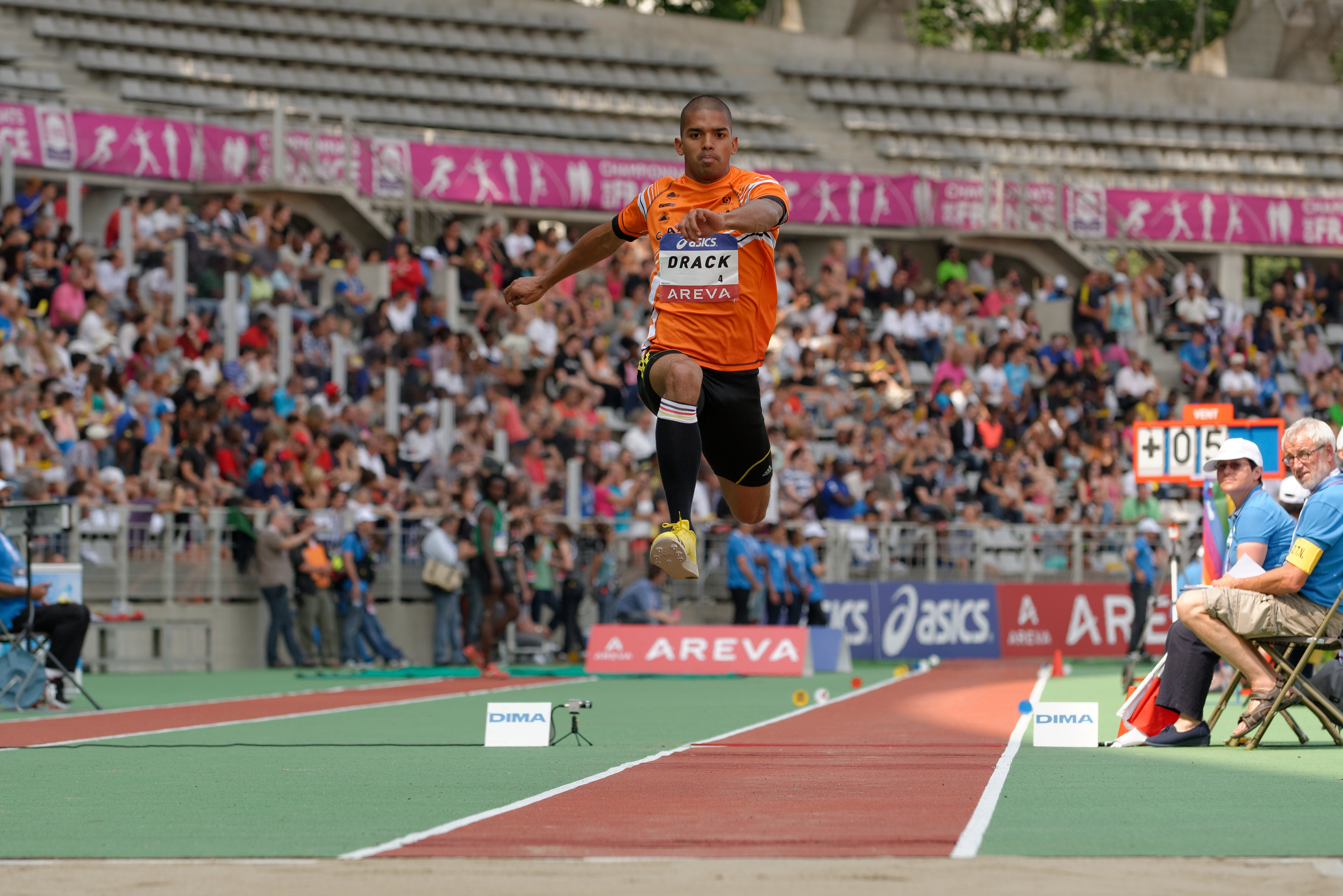
- Jonathan Drack in 2013

Personal information
- Born: 16 November 1988 (age 37) Beau-Bassin Rose-Hill, Mauritius
- Height: 1.84 m (6 ft 0 in)
- Weight: 73 kg (161 lb)

Sport
- Sport: Track and field
- Event: Triple jump

Jean Patrick Jonathan Drack (born 16 November 1988 in Beau-Bassin Rose-Hill) is a Mauritian athlete specialising in the triple jump. He represented his country at the 2015 World Championships in Beijing finishing eleventh. He also competed at the previous edition in Moscow but without qualifying for the final.

His personal bests in the event are 17.05 metres outdoors (2015) and 16.67 metres indoors (Karlsruhe 2016).

He competed for Mauritius at the 2016 Summer Olympics but did not qualify for the final. He was the flag bearer for Mauritius during the closing ceremony.

== Competition record ==
Year	Competition	Venue	Position	Event	Notes
Representing Mauritius
2013	World Championships	Moscow, Russia	20th (q)	Triple jump	15.54 m
2014	Commonwealth Games	Glasgow, United Kingdom	8th (q)	Triple jump	16.13 m
2015	Indian Ocean Island Games	Saint-Denis, Réunion	1st	Triple jump	17.05 m
2015	World Championships	Beijing, China	11th	Triple jump	16.64 m
2016	World Indoor Championships	Portland, United States	13th	Triple jump	16.04 m
2016	African Championships	Durban, South Africa	4th	Triple jump	16.61 m
2016	Olympic Games	Rio de Janeiro, Brazil	28th (q)	Triple jump	16.21 m
2017	Jeux de la Francophonie	Abidjan, Ivory Coast	5th	Triple jump	16.05 m
2018	Commonwealth Games	Gold Coast, Australia	19th (q)	Long jump	7.37 m
2018	Commonwealth Games	Gold Coast, Australia	6th	Triple jump	16.28 m
2018	African Championships	Asaba, Nigeria	5th	Triple jump	16.41 m
2019	African Games	Rabat, Morocco	17th (q)	Long jump	6.71 m
2019	African Games	Rabat, Morocco	3rd	Triple jump	16.53 m
