= Archel Evrard Biniakounou =

Congolese long jumper

Archel Evrard Biniakounou (born 4 April 1994) is a Congolese long jumper.

He finished eighteenth at the 2018 African Championships and fourth at the 2019 African Games. He also competed in the 100 metres at the 2012 World Junior Championships without reaching the final.

His personal best jump is 7.95 metres, achieved in the qualifying round at the 2019 African Games in Rabat. This is the Congolese record.
