= Athletics at the 2023 African Games – Men's triple jump =

Men's triple jump at the 2023 African Games
- Venue: Legon Sports Stadium
- Location: Accra, Ghana
- Dates: 20 March
- Competitors: 9 from 7 nations
- Winning distance: 16.97 m

Medalists
gold medal	Hugues Fabrice Zango	Burkina Faso
silver medal	Amath Faye	Senegal
bronze medal	Yacouba Loue	Burkina Faso

The men's triple jump event at the 2023 African Games was held on 20 March 2024 in Accra, Ghana.

== Results ==
Held on 20 March

Rank	Name	Nationality	#1	#2	#3	#4	#5	#6	Result	Notes
1st place, gold medalist(s)	Hugues Fabrice Zango	Burkina Faso	16.22	16.73	–	x	x	16.97	16.97	
2nd place, silver medalist(s)	Amath Faye	Senegal	16.15w	15.90	16.06	15.64	–	16.24	16.24	
3rd place, bronze medalist(s)	Yacouba Loué	Burkina Faso	15.23	15.84	15.82	15.86	15.66w	15.83	15.86	
4	Gilbert Pkemoi	Kenya	15.82	x	15.20	14.70	x	14.63	15.82	
5	Khoak Ayup	South Sudan	15.61	15.40	15.38	14.92	x	15.53	15.61	
6	Kitchman Ojulu	Ethiopia	15.30	15.45	15.35	15.48	x	x	15.48	
7	Bekele Jilo	Ethiopia	14.73	15.31	15.39	14.78	15.24	15.14	15.39	
8	Al-Assane Fofana	Mali	x	14.90	14.86	x	x	x	14.90	
9	Komi Bernard Konu	Togo	x	14.51	14.71				14.71	
