= Nathan Fox (triple jumper) =

English triple jumper

Personal information
- Born: 21 October 1990 (age 34) London, England
- Education: Brunel University
- Height: 1.90 m (6 ft 3 in)
- Weight: 88 kg (194 lb)

Sport
- Sport: Athletics
- Event: Triple jump
- Club: Shaftesbury Barnet Harriers
- Coached by: Sarah Hunter (–2010); Larry Achike (2011-2012); Frank Attoh (2012-2016); Tosin Oke (2016–)

Nathan Fox (born 21 October 1990) is an English former athlete who specialised in the triple jump.

== Biography ==
After breaking the UK under 15 national record at 14, he became the first British person of that age to jump over 14 metres (14.11m). Representing Great Britain as a schoolboy he placed 5th at the European Youth Olympics in 2007.

He then went on to place 6th at the 2014 Commonwealth Games in Glasgow.

He represented England at the 2014 Commonwealth Games in Glasgow and the 2017 World Championships.

He made the podium of the British Athletics Championships on seven occasions from 2010 to 2019.

His personal bests in the event are 16.81 metres outdoors (-1.4 m/s, Clermont 2017) and 16.53 metres indoors (Sheffield 2017).

== International competitions ==
Year	Competition	Venue	Position	Event	Notes
Representing Great Britain and England
2007	European Youth Olympic Festival	Glasgow, United Kingdom	5th	Triple jump	15.11 m
2014	Commonwealth Games	Glasgow, United Kingdom	6th	Triple jump	16.26 m
2017	World Championships	London, United Kingdom	19th (q)	Triple jump	16.49 m
