= Tosin Oke =

Nigerian triple jumper

Personal information
- Nationality: Nigerian/British
- Born: 1 October 1980 (age 45) London, England
- Height: 1.79 m (5 ft 10 1/2 in)
- Weight: 77 kg (170 lb)

Sport
- Sport: Athletics
- Event: Triple jump
- Club: Cambridge Harriers / Mizuno

Achievements and titles
- Highest world ranking: 7th
- Personal best: 17.23m
Medal record
Men's athletics
Representing Nigeria
All-Africa Games
| Gold medal – first place | 2011 Maputo | Triple jump |
| Gold medal – first place | 2015 Brazzaville | Triple jump |
African Championships in Athletics
| Gold medal – first place | 2010 Nairobi | Triple jump |
| Gold medal – first place | 2012 Porto-Novo | Triple jump |
| Gold medal – first place | 2016 Durban | Triple jump |
| Silver medal – second place | 2014 Marrakesh | Triple jump |
Commonwealth Games
| Gold medal – first place | 2010 New Delhi | Triple jump |
| Silver medal – second place | 2014 Glasgow | Triple jump |

Oluwatosin Bamidele Oke (born 1 October 1980) is a British-Nigerian former track and field athlete, who competed in the triple jump. Born a dual national, he initially competed for Great Britain. He set the current UK junior indoor record and was 1 cm shy of the outdoor junior record. He was the 1999 European Athletics Junior Championships Champion, and came 5th at the 2002 Commonwealth Games. After multiple indoor and outdoor UK titles, he later switched to compete for Nigeria. Since competing for Nigeria he has won back-to-back African Championships in Athletics titles and the Commonwealth Games championship and is the current All-Africa Games Champion. At the 2012 Summer Olympics Oke finished seventh in the triple jump final, the best Nigerian result of the Games.

== Early life ==
Oke was born in Newham, London to Yoruba Nigerian parents, and later moved to Islington, Hackney and Greenwich where he spent his late teens.

== Education ==
Tosin went to Amhurst Primary School, now called Brook Community School, where he left early to attend Secondary School at King's College Lagos. After just under 2 years, he returned to London to attend Christ's College, a private School in Blackheath, followed by A-levels at Thomas Tallis sixth form. From there he went on to study Chemistry at the University of Manchester, and Osteopathy at the British School of Osteopathy.

== Career ==
Oke began competing in 1997 for Cambridge Harriers, South-east London. Within 2 years, at age 18, he won the 1999 European Junior Championships with a jump of 16.57 metres, and in the same year jumped the UK indoor junior record of 16.12m, that still stands today. He also finished fifth at the 2002 Commonwealth Games and twelfth at the 2002 European Championships. In 2003 he came fourth in the European Cup.

His 16.65 metres from the 2002 Commonwealth Games was his personal best for many years. In the 2004–05 season he changed coaches to work with John Herbert, the coach of Phillips Idowu and Jade Johnson at the time. Between 1999 and 2007, Tosin suffered a multitude of injuries, from a Gilmore's groin, to a fractured fat pad in his foot. They severely hampered his progress, whilst his peers went on to win Olympic medals.

=== Osaka 2007 ===
In August 2007 he finally set a new personal best, jumping a World Championships B standard of 16.86 metres at the Crystal Palace National Sports Centre. He was controversially left out of the British World Championships team for Osaka initially by Dave Collins and further backed up by Niels de Vos. Oke described the decision as, 'dysfunction at best, and very sinister at worst'.

=== Returning home ===
In 2008, Tosin declared his interest in competing for his country of origin, Nigeria. He also returned to work with his old coach, but set his own schedules, and assumed full control over his training. In 2009 at the Mobil Nigerian National Championships, Tosin jumped a World Championship B standard of 16.65m, and represented Nigeria for the first time at the 2009 World Championships in Berlin. At the World Championships he did not reach the final, but came 7th in his qualification group achieving a new personal best of 16.87 metres. He finished the year ranked 47th in the world.

=== Championships success ===
In the 2010 season, Tosin jumped a series of personal bests indoors, finishing with 16.89m in Birmingham. Outdoors he opened up with a short approach competition at the Loughborough international, and in his second competition broke the British Athletics League record with 17.05m at Copthall, Hendon. In his finest season so far, he went on to win the 2010 African Championships in Nairobi, Kenya with a personal best jump of 17.22m, 1 cm off the Championship record, and to top it off, became the 2010 Commonwealth Games Champion in New Delhi, India with his second furthest jump ever—17.16m. Oke finished the year ranked 9th in the world.

2011 was an indifferent season for Oke, with many ups and downs. Due to the long 2010 season, Tosin decided to give the indoor circuit a miss. He opened up outdoors in Daegu with a modest 16.74m, and within two Meets jumped 17.14m at the Nigerian National trials, backed up with a 17.20m in Barcelona – where he got injured, and a 17.21m at the Diamond League meeting in London – where he got injured again! Needless to say, with multiple injuries, the World Championships in Daegu was not a happy hunting ground; he jumped 16.60m, came 8th in his qualifying group, but did not make it to the final. Two weeks later, a heavily strapped up Oke, was able to rise to the occasion for his country, and jump a last gasp 16.65m at the 2011 All-Africa Games in Maputo, Mozambique for the gold medal. After the end of season heroics, Oke finished the season ranked 14th in the world.

Tosin opened up the 2012 Olympic season with a bang, a 17.23m personal best at his National trials in Calabar really signalled his intent for the year ahead. A few days later he went to Porto Novo for the 2012 African Championships in Athletics, to defend his title. He did so with a 5th round jump of 16.98m a distance he deemed sufficient to retain his title, and make his countrymen proud once again. His next competition was the Diamond League in London, where he came third to Christian Taylor & Leevan Sands with a jump of 16.93m in the rain and wind of London.

=== London 2012 Olympics ===
Next it was the big one, the 2012 Summer Olympics. Oke was ranked 11th in the world going into this competition, and qualified with relative ease with a jump of 16.83m to come 9th overall in the qualifying round. The final was a different affair, he managed two very different 16.90m+ jumps and was suffering from runway issues due to a recurrence of his hamstring injury from 2011. He came a creditable 7th, but knew the opportunity for an Olympic medal was lost after his great start to the season. In his post event interview, Oke severely criticised the Nigerian team's preparation for the Games, and implicated that his sports administrators were not giving Government released funds to the athletes, something that destroyed the team's chances at the Games. His comments stirred action at the highest level of Nigerian politics; the President Goodluck Jonathan, ordered an immediate overhaul of the sports sector, and the fallout from Team Nigeria's overall performance at the Games is ongoing. In his next competition, Oke jumped 16.76m in round three, and when he tried to push for the big one, strained his hamstring at take-off. According to him, it had been coming for a while – since April, but he was just trying to manage the problem until after the Olympics. He finished the season ranked 8th in the world, and is due to see the world-renowned Dr. Hans-Wilhelm Müller-Wohlfahrt to solve his hamstring problem.

=== Glasgow 2014 Commonwealth Games ===
2013 started off well with a 16.87m jump indoors, but became Tosin's most injury plagued season culminating in a torn adductor tendon at a competition in the Netherlands. He struggled to get back to full health by the World Championships in Moscow, and reaggravated the injury whilst in Moscow.

The 2014 season saw a return to training in London, with his friend long jumper Matthew (Matt) Burton, an athlete Tosin mentored and coached. He opened the season with his first ever win at a World Challenge competition – Marrakesh, and jumped 17.21m in his first round to win his 5th Nigerian national title.

The Commonwealth Games in Glasgow were bittersweet; Tosin aimed to retain his title, but after an hours delay in the start time, and a torrential downpour in round 2, just after the South African Godfrey Mokoena, had taken the lead in calm conditions, a silver medal was the best Tosin could achieve. A few weeks later in Marrakesh for the African Championships, Tosin again came second to the South African, for his second major silver that year.

=== 2015 season ===
A year of positives and not so positives for Tosin. He made his first World Championships final, coming 8th in Beijing, and also retained his All-Africa Games title later on in the year in Brazzaville. On the negative side, his Federation tried their best to scupper his performances by owing him funds, and creating false stories about him in the media. With all of this to contend with, Tosin was still voted the best track and field athlete of 2015 at the Nigerian sports awards.

=== Rio 2016 Olympics ===
Tosin started off the season with a solid performance at the Doha Diamond League meeting, and a second place at the Hengeo World Challenge meeting. He won back his African Champs title from Godfrey Mokoena on home soil with a season's best jump of 17.13m. He later got a viral infection just before the London Anniversary Games, and jumped a below par 16.30m.

Next it was Rio de Janeiro. Tosin's worst major championships performance ever came about from having a viral infection just before the games, and being owed thousands of pounds of flight money until 36hrs before the event. Team morale within the Nigerian team was at an all-time low, despite the bronze medal won by the football team. He fared no better for the post Rio competitions, however seemed to be getting better health wise by the last competition of the year in Berlin.

== Competition record ==
| Year | Competition | Venue | Position | Notes |
Representing Great Britain and England
| 1999 | European Junior Championships | Riga, Latvia | 1st | 16.57 m |
| 2002 | Commonwealth Games | Manchester, United Kingdom | 5th | 16.65 m |
| 2002 | European Championships | Munich, Germany | 12th | NM |
| 2003 | European Cup | Florence, Italy | 4th | 16.45m |
Representing Nigeria
| 2009 | World Championships | Berlin, Germany | 16th (q) | 16.87 m |
| 2010 | African Championships | Nairobi, Kenya | 1st | 17.22 m |
| 2010 | Commonwealth Games | New Delhi, India | 1st | 17.16 m |
| 2011 | World Championships | Daegu, South Korea | 16th (q) | 16.60 m |
| 2011 | All-Africa Games | Maputo, Mozambique | 1st | 16.65 m |
| 2012 | African Championships | Porto-Novo, Benin | 1st | 16.98 m |
| 2012 | Olympic Games | London, United Kingdom | 7th | 16.95 m |
| 2014 | Commonwealth Games | Glasgow, United Kingdom | 2nd | 16.84 m |
| 2014 | African Championships | Marrakesh, Morocco | 2nd | 16.97 m |
| 2014 | Continental Cup | Marrakesh, Morocco | 4th | 16.89 m |
| 2015 | World Championships | Beijing, China | 8th | 16.81 m |
| 2015 | African Games | Brazzaville, Republic of the Congo | 1st | 17.00 m |
| 2016 | World Indoor Championships | Portland, United States | 6th | 16.73 m |
| 2016 | African Championships | Durban, South Africa | 1st | 17.13 m |
| 2016 | Olympic Games | Rio de Janeiro, Brazil | 23rd (q) | 16.47 m |
| 2017 | World Championships | London, United Kingdom | 25th (q) | 16.17 m |
