= Hugues Fabrice Zango =

Burkinabé athlete (born 1993)

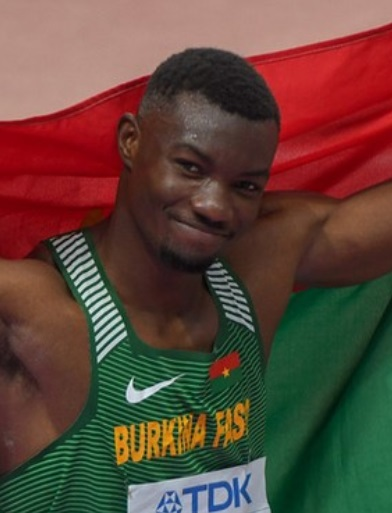
- Zango in 2019

Personal information
- Nationality: Burkinabe
- Born: 25 June 1993 (age 33) Ouagadougou, Burkina Faso
- Education: Artois University (PhD)
- Height: 1.80 m (5 ft 11 in)
- Weight: 78 kg (172 lb)

Sport
- Country: Burkina Faso
- Sport: Athletics
- Event: Triple jump

Achievements and titles
- Highest world ranking: 1st (Triple jump, 2023)
- Personal bests: Triple jump: 18.07 m Long jump: 7.71 m
Medal record
Men's athletics
Representing Burkina Faso
Olympic Games
Bronze medal – third place	2020 Tokyo	Triple jump
World Championships
Gold medal – first place	2023 Budapest	Triple jump
Silver medal – second place	2022 Eugene	Triple jump
Bronze medal – third place	2019 Doha	Triple jump
World Indoor Championships
Gold medal – first place	2024 Glasgow	Triple jump
Bronze medal – third place	2025 Nanjing	Triple jump
African Games
Gold medal – first place	2019 Rabat	Triple jump
Gold medal – first place	2023 Accra	Triple jump
African Championships
Gold medal – first place	2018 Asaba	Triple jump
Gold medal – first place	2022 Mauritius	Triple jump
Gold medal – first place	2024 Douala	Triple jump
Silver medal – second place	2016 Durban	Triple jump
Jeux de la Francophonie
Gold medal – first place	2017 Abidjan	Triple jump
Gold medal – first place	2023 Kinshasa	Triple jump
Summer Universiade
Silver medal – second place	2015 Gwangju	Triple jump
Silver medal – second place	2017 Taipei	Triple jump
Representing Africa
Continental Cup
Silver medal – second place	2018 Ostrava	Triple jump

Hugues Fabrice Zango (born 25 June 1993) is a Burkinabé athlete who specialises in the triple jump. He is the world indoor record holder in the triple jump with a jump of 18.07 m (59 ft 3 1/4 in) set in 2021 and the reigning world champion, winning the gold medal in the triple jump at the 2023 World Championships. Zango competed at the 2016 Summer Olympics in Rio de Janeiro, Brazil, and won the bronze medal at the 2020 Summer Olympics in Tokyo, Japan, in the triple jump event, the first ever Olympic medal for Burkina Faso. He has also competed in World Championships, two African athletics championships, a Jeux de la Francophonie, two Summer Universiades and two African Games. He became Burkina Faso's first-ever Olympic medalist, earning a bronze medal in Tokyo, and set the African triple jump record at the 2019 World Athletics Championships in Doha.

== Competition ==
Zango's debut at an international athletics competition was at the 2013 Summer Universiade, where he competed in the triple jump. In the qualification round his best jump was 15.74 metres, a distance that qualified him for the final. Zango finished sixth with a jump of 15.96 metres in the final. His jump was 1.05 metres smaller than the jump of gold medalist, Ukrainian Viktor Kuznyetsov, and 61 centimetres smaller than the bronze medalist, Kazakhstani Yevgeniy Ektov.

Also in 2013 was the 2013 Jeux de la Francophonie. At the 2013 Jeux de la Francophonie, Zango competed in the triple jump. He jumped 15.97 metres to finish tenth in a twelve-athlete field.

Zango's next major competition was the 2015 Summer Universiade, where he competed in both the long jump and the triple jump. In the long jump, Zango's best jump was 6.73 metres, a distance that placed him 30th in qualification, out of 36 athletes. (Note: Two athletes; Mehakpreet Singh and Sylvester Nakeel; did not record a legal distance.) He did not qualify for the final. In the triple jump, Zango qualified for the final after jumping a distance of 16.59 metres in the qualification round. In the final, Zango jumped 16.76 metres, a distance that won him the silver medal. Zango's jump was 53 centimetres smaller than the gold-medalist's (Russian Dmitriy Sorokin's) jump of 17.29 metres. Zango jumped the same distance as bronze medalist Xu Xiaolong (China) but, as Zango's second best jump was further than Xiaolong's, Zango won the silver medal on count back. Zango was Burkina Faso's only medalist at the 2015 Summer Universiade.

Zango competed at the 2015 World Championships in the triple jump. In the competition, all three of his jumps were fouls and therefore he recorded no mark (NM). Zango then competed in the 2015 African Games. Zango finished fifth in the triple jump with a jump of 16.36 metres. Zango was 19 centimetres behind the bronze medalist, Mamadou Chérif Dia of Mali. At the 2016 African Athletics Championships, Zango won the silver medal in the triple jump. He jumped 16.81 metres, which was 32 centimetres less than the distance jumped by the gold medalist, Nigerian Tosin Oke. Zango jumped four centimetres further than the bronze medalist, Godfrey Khotso Mokoena of South Africa, and 20 centimetres further than the fourth-placed athlete, Mauritian Jonathan Drack.

=== 2016 Summer Olympics ===
At the 2016 Summer Olympics, Zango competed in the triple jump. Zango jumped 15.99 metres in the qualification round. His jump was the 34th best out of 47 athletes. (Note: Eight athletes; Latario Collie-Minns, Yordanys Durañona, Muhammad Halim, Ruslan Kurbanov, Marian Oprea, Şeref Osmanoğlu, Lasha Torgvaidze and Roman Valiyev; did not record a legal distance.) Zango's jump was 62 centimetres less than the shortest jump by an athlete that qualified for the final, Cuban Lázaro Martínez. Therefore, Zango was eliminated from the competition.

=== 2019 World Championships ===
Before the 2019 World Championships in Doha, Burkina Faso's best Athletics World Championship result was 10th place for Franck Zio in the long jump at the 1995 World Championships in Gothenburg. Qualifying for the final in Doha, Zango performed consistently well with 17.46 m in round 2 and 17.56 m in round 5, before setting a new African Record with a distance of 17.66 m in the sixth and final round. With this record, Zango claimed the bronze medal - his (and Burkina Faso's) first at a major championship.

=== 2020 Summer Olympics ===
In the 2020 Summer Olympics, held in 2021, Zango won the bronze medal (and so far the only one for his country in the Olympics) in the men's triple jump with a distance of 17.47 meters. He qualified for the final with a distance of 16.83 meters in the earlier heats. Going into the event, he was ranked fourth in the world and had a personal and season best of 18.07 meters. This was Burkina Faso's first Olympic medal, and Zango earned it on 5 Aug, Burkina's Independence Day.

== Indoor world record ==
On 16 Jan 2021, in his final attempt jumping at a jumps-only indoor meet in Aubière, France, Zango jumped 18.07 m (59 ft 3 1/4 in) to improve his coach, Teddy Tamgho's Indoor World Record by 15 cm. He became the first world record holder from Burkina Faso and the first African to hold a world record in a jumping event. The jump ranks him the 6th performer in history, indoors or outdoors.

== Personal bests ==
Event	Best	Venue	Date	Notes	Citation
Triple jump	18.07 m (indoor); 17.82 m	Aubière, France; Székesfehérvár	16 January 2021; 6 July 2021	WIR AR NR	
Long jump	7.71 m	Pierre-Bénite, France	28 August 2020		
100 metres	10.72 s	Tergnier, France	25 May 2017		
200 metres	23.08 s	Saint-Pol-sur-Ternoise, France	1 May 2017		

- All information taken from IAAF profile.

== Competition record ==
Year	Competition	Venue	Position	Event	Notes
Representing Burkina Faso
2013	Universiade	Kazan, Russia	6th	Triple jump	15.96 m
2013	Jeux de la Francophonie	Nice, France	10th	Triple jump	15.97 m
2015	Universiade	Gwangju, South Korea	30th (q)	Long jump	6.73 m
2015	Universiade	Gwangju, South Korea	2nd	Triple jump	16.76 m
2015	World Championships	Beijing, China	–	Triple jump	NM
2015	African Games	Brazzaville, Republic of the Congo	5th	Triple jump	16.36 m
2016	African Championships	Durban, South Africa	2nd	Triple jump	16.81 m
2016	Olympic Games	Rio de Janeiro, Brazil	34th (q)	Triple jump	15.99 m
2017	Jeux de la Francophonie	Abidjan, Ivory Coast	1st	Triple jump	16.92 m (w)
2017	Universiade	Taipei, Taiwan	2nd	Triple jump	16.97 m
2018	World Indoor Championships	Birmingham, United Kingdom	6th	Triple jump	17.11 m
2018	African Championships	Asaba, Nigeria	8th	4 × 100 m relay	40.96 s
2018	African Championships	Asaba, Nigeria	1st	Triple jump	17.11 m NR
2019	African Games	Rabat, Morocco	1st	Triple jump	16.88 m
2019	World Championships	Doha, Qatar	3rd	Triple jump	17.66 m AR
2021	Olympic Games	Tokyo, Japan	3rd	Triple jump	17.47 m
2022	African Championships	Port Louis, Mauritius	1st	Triple jump	17.34 m (w)
2022	World Championships	Eugene, United States	2nd	Triple jump	17.55 m
2023	Jeux de la Francophonie	Kinshasa, DR Congo	1st	Triple jump	17.11 m
2023	World Championships	Budapest, Hungary	1st	Triple jump	17.64 m
2024	World Indoor Championships	Glasgow, United Kingdom	1st	Triple jump	17.53 m
2024	African Games	Accra, Ghana	1st	Triple jump	16.97 m
2024	African Championships	Douala, Cameroon	1st	Triple jump	17.18 m
2024	Olympic Games	Paris, France	5th	Triple jump	17.50 m
2025	World Indoor Championships	Nanjing, China	3rd	Triple jump	17.15 m
2025	World Championships	Tokyo, Japan	7th	Triple jump	16.92 m

== Personal life ==
Zango graduated with a Master's degree in Electronics, Electrical energy, and Automation from the University of Artois (Hauts-de-France, France) in 2018. Subsequently, he began working on a PhD degree in electrical engineering at the same university. He completed this degree on 22 December 2023.

== See also ==
- Burkina Faso at the Olympics

== Notes ==
Records
Preceded by (Morocco) Tarik Bouguetaïb	Men's Triple jump African Record Holder; 29 September 2019 – present	Incumbent
Preceded by (France) Teddy Tamgho	Men's Triple Jump Indoor World Record Holder; 16 January 2021 – present	Incumbent
Olympic Games
Preceded by Rachid Sidibé	Flagbearer for Burkina Faso; Tokyo 2020 with Angelika Ouedraogo; Paris 2024 with Marthe Koala	Succeeded by Incumbent
