= Mohammed Abubakar =

Ghanaian footballer (born 2000)

Mohammed Abubakar (born 22 May 2000) is a Ghanaian professional footballer who plays as a midfielder or left-back for Ghanaian Premier League side Karela United.

== Career ==
=== Karela United ===
Abubakar joined Karela United in 2017. During the 2019 GFA Normalization Committee Special Competition, he was named on the bench for two matches against Elmina Sharks on 5 May 2019 and on 8 May 2019 against International Allies. He made his professional debut during the 2019–20 Ghana Premier League season, playing the full 90 minutes of a 1–0 loss against Berekum Chelsea on 5 February 2020. He subsequently made two league appearances, against Accra Hearts of Oak and Medeama SC, playing the full 90 minutes in both matches, bringing his total number of matches to three before the league was put on hold and later canceled due to the COVID-19 pandemic.

== Playing style ==
Abubakar can play as a defender, attacking midfielder or defensive midfielder. He has been praised for his vision, passing, and dribbling skills. He cites Mesut Özil as a role model. Abubakar has also received praise for his versatility, being adept at playing in the centre of the pitch as well as out wide.
