= Tarik Bouguetaïb =

Moroccan athlete (born 1981)

Tarik Bouguetaïb طارق بوقطايب
Personal information
- Born: 30 April 1981 (age 45) Casablanca, Morocco
Medal record
Men's Athletics
Representing Morocco
African Championships
Gold medal – first place	2006 Mauritius	Triple Jump
Bronze medal – third place	2008 Addis Ababa	Triple Jump
Mediterranean Games
Silver medal – second place	2005 Almería	Triple Jump

Tarik Bouguetaïb (Arabic: طارق بوقطايب; born 30 April 1981) is a Moroccan long jumper and triple jumper. He was born in Casablanca.

== Career ==
In the long jump he finished thirteenth at the 2006 African Championships. He also competed at the Olympic Games in 2004 and 2008 without reaching the final.

His personal best jump is 8.22 metres, achieved in March 2008 in Meknès.

In the triple jump won the 2006 African Championships, finished sixth at the 2006 World Cup and won the bronze medal at the 2008 African Championships. He also competed at the 2005 World Championships and the 2007 World Championships without reaching the final.

His personal best jump is 17.37 metres, achieved in July 2007 in Khémisset. This is the African record.
