= 300 metres =

Athletics event

Athletics 300 metres

World records
- Men: Letsile Tebogo (BOT) 30.69 A (2024)
- Women: Marita Koch (GDR) 34.14+ (1985)

Short track world records
- Men: Steven Gardiner (BAH) 31.56 (2022)
- Women: Irina Privalova (RUS) 35.45 (1993); Shaunae Miller-Uibo (BAH) 35.45 (2018)

The 300 metres is an uncommon (meaning not on an Olympic or World Championship program) sprinting event in track and field competitions. The race starts on a straight and therefore comprises two straights and one bend.

The imperial distance analogue to the event is the 300 yards (270 m), which is slightly shorter than the 300 m (330 yd) distance and was contested at the USA Indoor Track and Field Championships from 1906 to 1932.

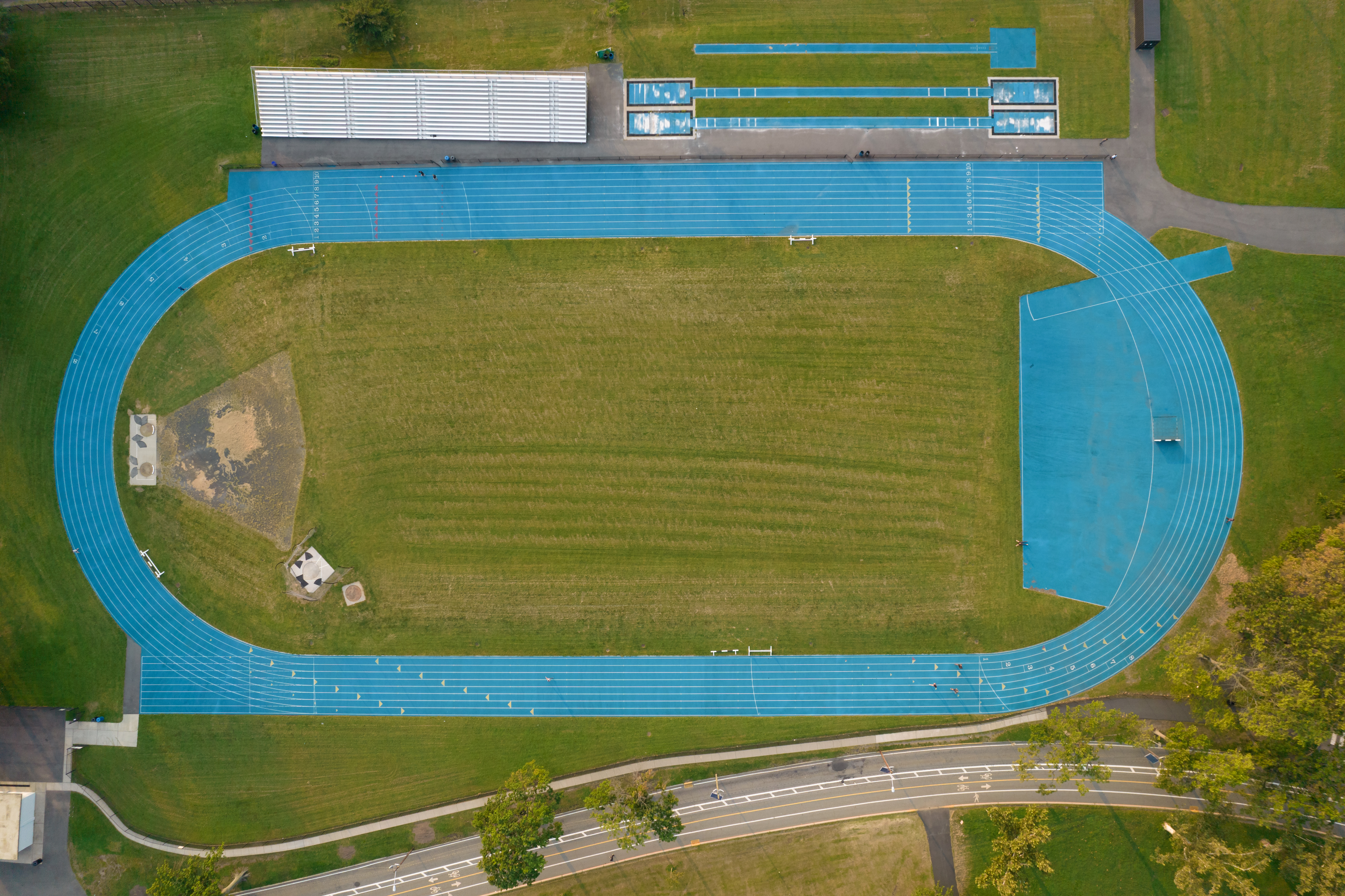
Start (green) and end (red) points of a 300-metre race, marked on a running track.

== All-time top 25 ==
Tables show data for two definitions of "Top 25" - the top 25 300m times and the top 25 athletes:
- denotes top performance for athletes in the top 25 300m times
- denotes lesser performances, still in the top 25 300m times, by repeat athletes
- denotes top performance (only) for other top 25 athletes who fall outside the top 25 300m times

=== Men (outdoor) ===
- Correct as of April 2026.

Ath.#	Perf.#	Time (s)	Athlete	Nation	Date	Place	Ref.
1	1	30.69 A	Letsile Tebogo	Botswana	17 February 2024	Pretoria	
2	2	30.81	Wayde van Niekerk	South Africa	28 June 2017	Ostrava	
3	3	30.85 A	Michael Johnson	United States	24 March 2000	Pretoria	
4	4	30.97	Usain Bolt	Jamaica	27 May 2010	Ostrava	
	5	31.03	van Niekerk #2		11 June 2016	Kingston	
5	6	31.23	LaShawn Merritt	United States	11 June 2016	Kingston	
	7	31.30	Merritt #2		7 June 2009	Eugene	
	8	31.31	Merritt #3		8 August 2006	Eugene	
6	9	31.38	Muzala Samukonga	Zambia	28 April 2026	Pretoria	
7	10	31.44	Isaac Makwala	Botswana	28 June 2017	Ostrava	
8	11	31.48	Roberto Hernández	Cuba	3 September 1990	Jerez de la Frontera	
8	11	31.48	Danny Everett	United States	3 September 1990	Jerez de la Frontera	
10	13	31.52	Steven Gardiner	Bahamas	12 May 2022	Ponce	
	14	31.52 A	Tebogo #2		18 February 2023	Pretoria	
	15	31.53	Merritt #2		1 August 2015	Atlanta	
	16	31.56	Johnson #2		22 July 1994	Salamenca	
11	17	31.56	Douglas Walker	Great Britain	19 July 1998	Gateshead	
12	18	31.58	Lythe Pillay	South Africa	28 April 2026	Pretoria	
	19	31.59	Gardiner #2		17 March 2023	Carolina	
13	20	31.61	Anthuan Maybank	United States	13 July 1996	Durham	
13	20	31.61	Clarence Munyai	South Africa	28 June 2017	Ostrava	
	22	31.63	van Niekerk #3		7 June 2015	Birmingham	
15	23	31.64	Tony McQuay	United States	11 June 2016	Kingston	
16	24	31.67	John Regis	Great Britain	17 July 1992	Gateshead	
	25	31.69	Hernández #2		20 June 1990	Bratislava	
17		31.70	Kirk Baptiste	United States	18 August 1984	London	
18		31.72	Jeremy Wariner	United States	12 June 2008	Ostrava	
19		31.73	Thomas Jefferson	United States	22 August 1987	London	
20		31.74	Gabriel Tiacoh	Ivory Coast	6 August 1986	A Coruña	
21		31.77	Tyler Christopher	Canada	20 May 2004	Sainte Anne	
21		31.77	Gordeo Isaacs	South Africa	28 April 2026	Pretoria	
23		31.80	Pavel Maslák	Czech Republic	28 June 2017	Ostrava	
24		31.81	Gil Roberts	United States	11 June 2016	Kingston	
24		31.81	Vernon Norwood	United States	12 May 2022	Ponce	

=== Men (indoor) ===
- Correct as of January 2026.

Ath.#	Perf.#	Time (s)	Athlete	Nation	Date	Place	Ref.
1	1	31.56	Steven Gardiner	Bahamas	27 January 2022	Columbia	
2	2	31.87 A	Noah Lyles	United States	3 March 2017	Albuquerque	
3	3	31.88	Wallace Spearmon	United States	9 February 2006	Fayetteville	
4	4	31.92 A	Paul Dedewo	United States	3 March 2017	Albuquerque	
5	5	31.94	Kerron Clement	United States	9 February 2006	Fayetteville	
6	6	31.94	LaShawn Merritt	United States	9 February 2006	Fayetteville	
7	7	31.97	Bralon Taplin	Grenada	13 February 2017	Ostrava	
8	8	31.99	Jacory Patterson	United States	14 January 2022	Clemson	
	9	32.06	Gardiner #2		14 January 2022	Birmingham	
9	10	32.10	Jereem Richards	Trinidad and Tobago	9 February 2018	Boston	
9	10	32.10	Sidi Njie	United States	10 January 2026	Clemson	
9	10	32.10	Garrett Kaalund	United States	16 January 2026	Spokane	
	13	32.14	Richards #2		24 January 2026	Boston	
12	14	32.15	Pavel Maslák	Czech Republic	8 February 2014	Gent	
	15	32.15	Lyles #2		24 January 2026	Boston	
	16	32.16	Lyles #3		4 March 2017	Albuquerque	
	17	32.18	Patterson #2		31 January 2025	Clemson	
13	18	32.19	Robson Caetano da Silva	Brazil	23 February 1989	Karlsruhe	
	19	32.19	Maslák #2		14 February 2017	Ostrava	
14	20	32.21	Rai Benjamin	United States	2 February 2025	Boston	
15	21	32.22	Tyson Williams	United States	10 January 2026	Columbia	
	22	32.26	Gardiner #3		16 February 2019	Columbia	
	23	32.28	Patterson #3		17 January 2020	Blacksburg	
16	24	32.32	Torrin Lawrence	United States	21 January 2010	Blacksburg	
17	25	32.34	Auhmad Robinson	United States	10 January 2025	College Station	
18		32.36	Frank Fredericks	Namibia	27 February 2003	Karlsruhe	
18		32.36	Brian Faust	United States	13 January 2024	Clemson	
18		32.36	Josiah Wrice	United States	10 January 2026	Columbia	
21		32.37	Lalonde Gordon	Trinidad and Tobago	3 February 2017	New York	
21		32.37	Judson Lincoln IV	United States	6 December 2024	Clemson	
23		32.38	Greg Nixon	United States	9 February 2009	Liévin	
23		32.38	Takudzwa Chiyangwa	Zimbabwe	25 January 2025	Clemson	
23		32.38	Vernon Norwood	United States	24 January 2026	Boston	

=== Women (outdoor) ===
- Correct as of August 2026.

Ath.#	Perf.#	Time (s)	Athlete	Nation	Date	Place	Ref.
1	1	34.41	Shaunae Miller-Uibo	Bahamas	20 June 2019	Ostrava	
2	2	34.60 A	Beatrice Masilingi	Namibia	18 February 2023	Pretoria	
3	3	35.16	Marileidy Paulino	Dominican Republic	17 March 2023	Carolina	
4	4	35.30 A	Ana Guevara	Mexico	3 May 2003	Mexico City	
5	5	35.46	Kathy Cook	Great Britain	18 August 1984	London	
5	5	35.46	Chandra Cheeseborough	United States	18 August 1984	London	
5	5	35.46	Henriette Jæger	Norway	22 May 2024	Bergen	
	8	35.49	Jæger #2		29 May 2026	Bergen	
	9	35.51	Cook #2		9 September 1983	London	
8	9	35.51	Natalia Bukowiecka	Poland	9 August 2025	Białystok	
	11	35.52	Bukowiecka #2		30 January 2024	Potchefstroom	
	12	35.56	Jæger #2		3 June 2025	Bergen	
9	13	35.70	Irena Szewinska	Poland	4 July 1975	London	
9	13	35.70	Léa Sprunger	Switzerland	25 May 2017	Langenthal	
11	15	35.71	Donna Fraser	Great Britain	28 August 2000	Gateshead	
12	16	35.74	Courtney Okolo	United States	23 July 2016	Houston	
13	17	35.76	Lurdes Gloria Manuel	Czech Republic	23 August 2026	Chorzów	
14	18	35.77 A	Mercy Oketch	Kenya	28 April 2026	Pretoria	
15	19	35.81	Silke-Beate Knoll	West Germany	19 May 1990	Olpe	
15	19	35.81 A	Kenondra Davis	United States	28 April 2026	Pretoria	
17	21	35.82	Cydonie Mothersille	Cayman Islands	14 September 2000	Sydney	
18	22	35.85	Salwa Eid Naser	Bahrain	9 August 2025	Białystok	
19	23	35.89	Shawnti Jackson	United States	27 March 2026	Coral Gables	
20	24	35.91	Brittany Brown	United States	20 June 2019	Ostrava	
	25	35.92	Guevara #2		19 August 2001	Gateshead	
21	25	35.92	Charlotte Henrich	Great Britain	23 August 2026	Chorzów	
22		35.94	Bassant Hemida	Egypt	9 August 2025	Białystok	
23		35.99	Merlene Ottey	Jamaica	18 August 1984	London	
24		36.00	Katharine Merry	Great Britain	28 August 2000	Gateshead	
24		36.00	LaTasha Colander	United States	28 August 2000	Gateshead	

=== Women (indoor) ===
- Correct as of February 2026.

Ath.#	Perf.#	Time (s)	Athlete	Nation	Date	Place	Ref.
1	1	35.45	Irina Privalova	Russia	16 January 1993	Moscow	
1	1	35.45	Shaunae Miller-Uibo	Bahamas	2 February 2018	New York	
3	3	35.54	Abby Steiner	United States	10 February 2023	New York	
4	4	35.69	Patricia Hall-Pritchett	Jamaica	13 February 2012	Liévin	
5	5	35.71	Quanera Hayes	United States	6 January 2017	Clemson	
	6	35.71	Miller-Uibo #2		11 February 2017	New York	
6	7	35.73	Gabby Thomas	United States	12 February 2021	Staten Island	
	8	35.75	Thomas #2		4 February 2024	Boston	
	9	35.79	Miller-Uibo #3		31 January 2026	Clemson	
	10	35.80	Steiner #2		11 December 2021	Louisville	
7	11	35.83 A	Merlene Ottey	Jamaica	13 March 1981	Pocatello	
7	11	35.83	JaMeesia Ford	United States	8 December 2023	Clemson	
	13	35.92	Thomas #3		24 January 2021	Fayetteville	
9	13	35.92	Stacey-Ann Williams	Jamaica	14 February 2026	Fayetteville	
10	15	35.94	Dejanea Oakley	Jamaica	10 January 2026	Clemson	
11	16	35.95	Brittany Brown	United States	22 February 2019	Staten Island	
	17	35.96 A	Ottey #2		13 March 1981	Pocatello	
	18	35.98	Thomas #4		23 February 2019	New York	
12	19	35.99	Lynna Irby-Jackson	United States	12 February 2021	Staten Island	
12	19	35.99	Favour Ofili	Nigeria	4 February 2024	Boston	
	21	36.05	Irby-Jackson #2		4 February 2024	Boston	
14	22	36.08	Talitha Diggs	United States	31 January 2025	Clemson	
	23	36.10	Miller-Uibo #4		15 February 2014	New York	
15	24	36.12	Sydney McLaughlin	United States	7 December 2017	Bloomington	
	24	36.12	Ford #2		30 January 2026	Fayetteville	
16		36.15 A	Phyllis Francis	United States	3 March 2017	Albuquerque	
17		36.16	Julien Alfred	Saint Lucia	2 February 2025	Boston	
18		36.20	Natalia Kaczmarek	Poland	4 February 2022	Spala	
19		36.24	Mariah Maxwell	United States	17 January 2026	Virginia Beach	
20		36.25	Natasha Hastings	United States	13 February 2016	Boston	
21		36.27	Ashley Spencer	United States	10 February 2017	New York	
22		36.30	Olesya Krasnomovets	Russia	6 January 2006	Yekaterinburg	
22		36.30	Elise Cooper	United States	1 March 2025	Philadelphia	
22		36.30	Rhasidat Adeleke	Ireland	14 February 2026	Fayetteville	
25		36.33	Allyson Felix	United States	8 February 2007	Fayetteville	
25		36.33	Amantle Montsho	Botswana	4 March 2010	Liévin	
25		36.33	Madison Whyte	United States	16 January 2026	Spokane	

== Best performances en-route to 400 metres result ==
=== Men (outdoor) ===
Correct as of September 2025.

Rank	Time (s)	Athlete	Nation	Date	Place	Ref.
1	31.04+	Wayde van Niekerk	South Africa	14 August 2016	Rio de Janeiro	
2	31.20+	Kirani James	Grenada	14 August 2016	Rio de Janeiro	
2	31.20+	LaShawn Merritt	United States	14 August 2016	Rio de Janeiro	
4	31.33+	Busang Kebinatshipi	Botswana	18 September 2025	Tokyo	
5	31.35+	Matthew Hudson-Smith	Great Britain	7 August 2024	Saint-Denis	
6	31.42+	Jereem Richards	Trinidad and Tobago	7 August 2024	Saint-Denis	
7	31.55+	Michael Johnson	United States	9 August 1995	Göteborg	
8	31.58+	Jeremy Wariner	United States	31 August 2007	Osaka	
9	31.59+	Zakithi Nene	South Africa	18 September 2025	Tokyo	
10	31.65+	Rusheen McDonald	Jamaica	18 September 2025	Tokyo	
11	31.81+	Quincy Hall	United States	7 August 2024	Saint-Denis	
12	31.88+	Angelo Taylor	United States	31 August 2007	Osaka	
13	31.91+	Chris Brown	Bahamas	31 August 2007	Osaka	
13	31.91+	Muzala Samukonga	Zambia	6 August 2024	Saint-Denis	

=== Men (indoor) ===
Correct as of March 2025.

Rank	Time (s)	Athlete	Nation	Date	Place	Ref.
1	32.50+	Jimy Soudril	France	21 March 2025	Nanjing	
2	32.65+	Attila Molnár	Hungary	8 March 2025	Apeldoorn	
3	32.73+	Karsten Warholm	Norway	2 March 2024	Glasgow	
4	32.75+	Rusheen McDonald	Jamaica	21 March 2025	Nanjing	
5	32.76+	Christopher Bailey	United States	22 March 2025	Nanjing	
6	32.77+	Brian Faust	United States	21 March 2025	Nanjing	
7	32.80+	Jacory Patterson	United States	21 March 2025	Nanjing	
8	32.86+	Maksymilian Szwed	Poland	7 March 2025	Apeldoorn	
9	32.88+	Alexander Doom	Belgium	2 March 2024	Glasgow	
10	32.90+	Matheus Lima	Brazil	21 March 2025	Nanjing	

=== Women (outdoor) ===
Correct as of September 2025.

Rank	Time (s)	Athlete	Nation	Date	Place	Ref.
1	34.14+	Marita Koch	East Germany	6 October 1985	Canberra	
2	34.78+	Marileidy Paulino	Dominican Republic	9 August 2024	Saint-Denis	
3	34.87+	Sydney McLaughlin-Levrone	United States	18 September 2025	Tokyo	
4	34.95+	Jarmila Kratochvílová	Czechoslovakia	18 August 1982	Zürich	
5	35.00+	Marie-José Pérec	France	27 August 1991	Tokyo	
5	35.00+	Salwa Eid Naser	Bahrain	18 September 2025	Tokyo	
7	35.01+	Olga Bryzgina	Ukraine	6 October 1985	Canberra	
8	35.24+	Tatána Kocembová	Czechoslovakia	10 August 1983	Helsinki	
9	35.29+	Nickisha Pryce	Jamaica	20 July 2024	London	
10	35.37+	Lieke Klaver	Netherlands	12 July 2024	Monaco	

=== Women (indoor) ===
Correct as of March 2025.

Rank	Time (s)	Athlete	Nation	Date	Place	Ref.
1	36.04+	Femke Bol	Netherlands	10 February 2024	Liévin	
1	36.04+	Amandine Brossier	France	10 February 2024	Liévin	
3	36.32+	Lieke Klaver	Netherlands	8 March 2025	Apeldoorn	
4	36.38+	Alexis Holmes	United States	22 March 2025	Nanjing	
5	36.42+	Henriette Jæger	Norway	8 March 2025	Apeldoorn	
6	36.54+	Amber Anning	Great Britain	22 March 2025	Nanjing	
7	36.83+	Paula Sevilla	Spain	8 March 2025	Apeldoorn	
8	36.88+	Martina Weil	Chile	22 March 2025	Nanjing	
9	36.93+	Lurdes Gloria Manuel	Czech Republic	8 March 2025	Apeldoorn	
10	37.17+	Rosey Effiong	United States	22 March 2025	Nanjing	
