= 2025 World Athletics Indoor Championships – Men's 400 metres =

Men's 400 metres at the 2025 World Athletics Indoor Championships
- Venue: Nanjing's Cube at Nanjing Youth Olympic Sports Park
- Location: Nanjing, China
- Dates: 21 March (heats & semi-finals); 22 March (final)
- Competitors: 26 from 19 nations
- Winning time: 45.08

Medalists
gold medal	Christopher Bailey	United States
silver medal	Brian Faust	United States
bronze medal	Jacory Patterson	United States

The men's 400 metres at the 2025 World Athletics Indoor Championships took place on the short track of the Nanjing's Cube at Nanjing Youth Olympic Sports Park in Nanjing, China, on 21 and 22 March 2025. This was the 21st time the event was contested at the World Athletics Indoor Championships. Athletes could qualify by achieving the entry standard or by their World Athletics Ranking in the event.

The heats took place on 21 March during the morning session with the semi-finals held in the evening session. The final took place on 22 March during the evening session.

== Background ==
The men's 400 metres was contested 20 times before 2025, at every previous edition of the World Athletics Indoor Championships.

Records before the 2025 World Athletics Indoor Championships
Record	Athlete (nation)	Time (s)	Location	Date
World record	Christopher Morales Williams (CAN)	44.49	Fayetteville, United States	24 February 2024
Championship record	Jereem Richards (TTO)	45.00	Belgrade, Serbia	19 March 2022
World leading	Christopher Bailey (USA)	44.70	Fayetteville, United States	14 February 2025

== Qualification ==
For the men's 400 metres, the qualification period ran from 1 September 2024 until 9 March 2025. Athletes could qualify by achieving the entry standards of 45.20 s. Athletes could also qualify by virtue of their World Athletics Ranking for the event or by virtue of their World Athletics Indoor Tour wildcard. There was a target number of 30 athletes.

== Results ==
=== Heats ===
The heats were held on 21 March, starting at 10:23 (UTC+8) in the morning. First 2 of each heat (Q) plus 2 fastest times (q) qualified to the semi-finals.

==== Heat 1 ====
Place	Athlete	Nation	Time	Notes
1	Brian Faust	United States	46.20	Q
2	Boško Kijanović	Serbia	46.62	Q, SB
3	Rusheen McDonald	Jamaica	46.72	q, SB
4	Matěj Krsek	Czech Republic	46.76	
5	Jimy Soudril	France	47.28	
6	Manuel Guijarro	Spain	47.47	

==== Heat 2 ====
Place	Athlete	Nation	Time	Notes
1	Christopher Bailey	United States	45.70	Q
2	Patrik Simon Enyingi	Hungary	46.23	Q
3	Cooper Sherman	Australia	46.52	q, PB
4	Ryo Yoshikawa	Japan	47.15	
5	Patrik Dömötör	Slovakia	47.47	PB

==== Heat 3 ====
Place	Athlete	Nation	Time	Notes
1	Attila Molnár	Hungary	46.35	Q
2	Fuga Sato	Japan	46.60	Q, PB
3	Wendell Miller	Bahamas	47.33	PB
4	Jadson Erick Soares Lima	Brazil	47.74	PB
5	Iñigo Pérez	Honduras	49.18	
6	Mohammad Jahir Rayhan	Bangladesh	49.84	SB

==== Heat 4 ====
Place	Athlete	Nation	Time	Notes
1	Matheus Lima	Brazil	45.79	Q, AR
2	Lionel Spitz	Switzerland	46.79	Q
3	Matej Baluch	Slovakia	48.14	
4	Rasheeme Griffith	Barbados	48.73	
5	Ailixier Wumaier	China	49.63	
—	Markel Fernández	Spain	DNS	

==== Heat 5 ====
Place	Athlete	Nation	Time	Notes
1	Christopher Morales Williams	Canada	45.85	Q
2	Jacory Patterson	United States	45.94	Q
3	Michal Desenský	Czech Republic	47.84	
4	Ruslan Litovski	Kyrgyzstan	50.10	
—	Malique Smith	United States Virgin Islands	DNS	
—	Kalinga Kumarage	Sri Lanka	DNS	

=== Semi-finals ===
The semi-finals were held on 21 March, starting at 20:47 (UTC+8). First 3 of each heat (Q) qualified to the final.

==== Heat 1 ====
Place	Athlete	Nation	Time	Notes
1	Christopher Bailey	United States	45.91	Q
2	Attila Molnár	Hungary	46.32	Q
3	Christopher Morales Williams	Canada	46.62	Q
4	Boško Kijanović	Serbia	47.20	
5	Rusheen McDonald	Jamaica	47.22	
6	Fuga Sato	Japan	48.31	

==== Heat 2 ====
Place	Athlete	Nation	Time	Notes
1	Brian Faust	United States	45.89	Q
2	Jacory Patterson	United States	45.89	Q
3	Matheus Lima	Brazil	46.22	Q
4	Patrik Simon Enyingi	Hungary	46.93	
5	Cooper Sherman	Australia	47.67	
6	Lionel Spitz	Switzerland	47.72	

=== Final ===
The final was started on 22 March, starting at 20:55 (UTC+8).

Rank	Athlete	Nation	Time	Notes
1st place, gold medalist(s)	Christopher Bailey	United States	45.08	
2nd place, silver medalist(s)	Brian Faust	United States	45.47	=PB
3rd place, bronze medalist(s)	Jacory Patterson	United States	45.54	
4	Attila Molnár	Hungary	45.77	
5	Christopher Morales Williams	Canada	46.71	
6	Matheus Lima	Brazil	46.94	
