= Jacory Patterson =

American sprinter (born 2000)

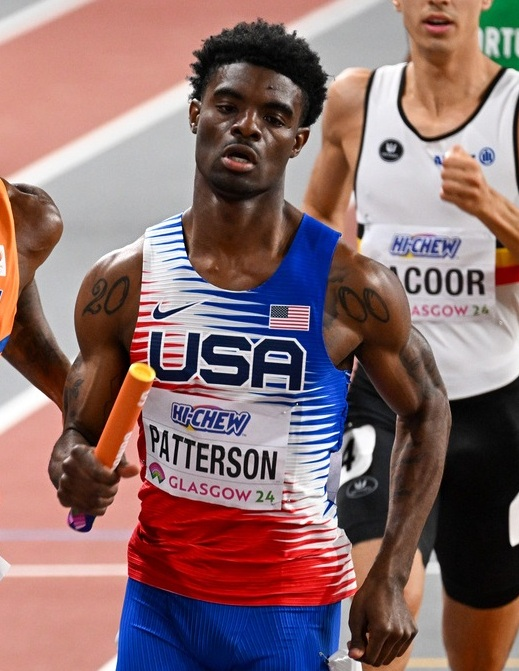
- Patterson running the 4 × 400 m at the 2024 World Athletics Indoor Championships

Personal information
- Nationality: American
- Born: February 2, 2000 (age 26)

Sport
- Country: United States
- Sport: Track and field
- Event: Sprints
- College team: Virginia Tech Hokies (2019–2021); Florida Gators (2022)

Achievements and titles
- Personal bests: Outdoor; 100 m: 10.11 (2022); 200 m: 20.20 (2022); 400 m: 43.78 (2026); Indoor; 60 m: 6.68 (2022); 200 m: 20.29 (2023); 300 m: 31.99 (2022) CR; 400 m: 45.05 (2023)
Medal record
Men's athletics
Representing the United States
World Championships
Silver medal – second place	2025 Tokyo	4 × 400 m relay
World Ultimate Championship
First place	2026 Budapest	4 × 400 m mixed
World Indoor Championships
Gold medal – first place	2025 Nanjing	4 × 400 m relay
Bronze medal – third place	2025 Nanjing	400 m
Diamond League
First place	2025	400 m

Jacory Patterson (born February 2, 2000) is an American track and field athlete specializing in the sprints. A native of Columbia, South Carolina, he won a gold medal at the 2016 USATF Junior Olympics in the long jump before focusing on sprinting events. Patterson attended Dreher High School in Columbia, where he broke the state record in the 200 m and won a state title in the 400 m.

As a freshman at Virginia Tech in 2019, Patterson set the world under-20 record in the indoor 300 m with a time of 32.49 s. After winning six Atlantic Coast Conference championships at Virginia Tech from 2019 to 2021, he transferred to the University of Florida ahead of his senior year. In 2022, Patterson set the collegiate record in the indoor 300 m with a time of 31.99 s to make him the eighth-fastest man in the history of the event.

== Early years ==
A native of Columbia, South Carolina, Patterson was born to Jamey Patterson and Charlene Bolton on February 2, 2000. He began track and field in the sixth grade because he always found himself to be the fastest kid on the playground. He attended Dreher High School, where he competed in track and field and basketball, though he dropped the latter after the tenth grade when he realized he had more potential on the track. Patterson won the long jump competition at the 2016 USATF Junior Olympics, as well as the South Carolina 4A state title in the 400 m as a senior in 2018. He broke the state record in the 200 m, as well as school records in the 100 m, 400 m, long jump and triple jump. Patterson narrowed down his college choices to Virginia Tech, LSU, Iowa, South Carolina and Clemson, ultimately committing to run track for the Virginia Tech Hokies in November 2017.

== College career ==
=== Virginia Tech ===
Patterson competed for the Virginia Tech Hokies in the Atlantic Coast Conference (ACC) from 2019 to 2021, winning six ACC championships.

==== 2019 indoor season ====
Patterson thought that the long jump could be his strongest event, but Virginia Tech sprints, hurdles, and relays coach Tim Vaught convinced him to focus on the sprints ahead of his freshman year. In his collegiate debut at the Virginia Tech Invitational on January 11, Patterson broke the world under-20 record in the indoor 300 m with a time of 32.49 seconds. It was the second fastest time in indoor collegiate history. "I kind of looked at him after that run," said Vaught. "He knew that his jumping career was over." Patterson was named the Division I men's national athlete of the week by the U.S. Track and Field Cross Country Coaches Association (USTFCCCA) for his performance. Two weeks later, he set a school record in the indoor 200 m after clocking 20.84 s at the Bob Pollock Invitational, shaving two-tenths of a second off the previous mark. Patterson broke another school record at the Virginia Tech Elite Meet on February 1, this time taking more than eight-tenths of a second off the indoor 400 m mark with a time of 46.14 s.

Patterson won the 400 m title at the ACC Indoor Championships with a time of 46.04 s, improving on his own school record and becoming the first Virginia Tech athlete to win an indoor conference title in the 400 m distance. He competed at the NCAA Division I Indoor Championships, but was not able to finish his race due to making contact with another runner.

==== 2019 outdoor season ====
In his first outdoor meet, Patterson posted a school record time in the 400 m at the Florida Relays. His official time of 45.76 s took almost a full second off the previous mark of 46.73 s set by Hillard Sumner in 1996. In April, Patterson won the 200 m race at the Tennessee Relays before winning the 400 m race at the War Eagle Invitational.

At the ACC Outdoor Championships, Patterson won the 400 m title and placed second in the 200 m. He also finished second as a member of the 4 × 100 m relay team, recording a school record time of 39.46 s alongside teammates Michael Davenport, Joseph Tay and Cole Beck. Lastly, Patterson anchored the 4 × 400 m relay team that finished fourth. "He went out and did a great job," said coach Vaught of his performance. "I knew the key [to competing in four events] was going to be the recovery in between and telling him what to do and that type of stuff. I knew he was tough enough and strong enough to be able to handle those events." At the NCAA preliminaries, Patterson improved his school record in the 400 m by clocking a time of 45.46 s. He also reset the school record in the 4 × 100 m relay by timing 39.24 s with Davenport, Tay and Beck.

==== 2020 indoor season ====
Patterson opened the season by setting the indoor 300 m collegiate record at the Virginia Tech Invitational with a time of a 32.28 seconds, breaking Torrin Lawrence's time of 32.32 seconds set in 2010. At the same meet, he anchored the 4 × 400 m relay team that recorded a school record time of 3:09.28. In February, Patterson broke his own school record in the indoor 400 m by running 45.75 s at the Texas Tech Shootout. Patterson improved on this mark once again at the ACC Indoor Championships, clocking 45.66 s to capture the 400 m title and qualify for the NCAA Division I Indoor Championships. He also claimed silver with the 4 × 400 m relay team. However, the national championships were cancelled due to the COVID-19 pandemic.

==== 2021 indoor season ====
After the cancellation of the 2020 outdoor season, Patterson took first place in the 300 m at the Virginia Tech Invitational to start the indoor season. His winning time of 32.61 ended up as the top indoor performance by an American in 2021. Patterson set a new school (and conference) record in the 400 m in February, running 45.24 for a second-place finish at the Tiger Paw Invitational. At the same event, he helped set a new school record in the 4 × 400 m relay, recording a time of 3:07.64 alongside teammates Patrick Forrest, Miles Green and Tyreke Sapp.

Patterson won the 200 m and 400 m titles at the ACC Indoor Championships, setting a school record of 20.62 s in the former and a meet record of 45.38 s in the latter. He became just the fourth male sprinter in ACC history to win the 200/400 m double at the conference championships, earning the men's award for Most Outstanding Track performer. Patterson won a bronze medal in the 400 m event at the NCAA Division I Indoor Championships, breaking his own ACC record with a time of 45.14 s. He was named the ACC Men's Indoor Track Performer of the Year at the conclusion of the season.

==== 2021 outdoor season ====
At the Florida Relays on April 3, Patterson became the first Virginia Tech athlete to break the 45-second barrier in the 400 m, clocking 44.81 s for a second-place finish. At the ACC Outdoor Championships, he won gold in the 400 m as well as the 4 × 400 m relay. The team of Patterson, Patrick Forrest, Cameron Rose and Tyreke Sapp became the first 4 × 400 m squad in school history to win an outdoor conference title. Patterson qualified to run in both events at the NCAA Division I Outdoor Championships, but instead announced his decision to transfer to the University of Florida just a few days before he was scheduled to compete.

Patterson competed at the U.S. Olympic Trials in June, reaching the 400 m semifinals before being eliminated.

=== Florida ===
Patterson competed for the Florida Gators in the Southeastern Conference (SEC) as a senior in 2022.

==== 2022 indoor season ====
Patterson won the Clemson Invitational in 31.99 s in his Florida debut, improving on his own 300 m collegiate record. He also set a personal best in the 60 m with a time of 6.68 s. At the Bob Pollock Invitational, Patterson won the 400 m race and ran the leadoff leg on the gold medal-winning 4 × 400 m relay team that set a new NCAA lead of 3:03.21. Two weeks later, he won the 200 m event and anchored the 4 × 400 m relay team to a new world-leading performance of 3:02.09 at the Tyson Invitational. At the SEC Indoor Championships, Patterson finished fourth in the 400 m before anchoring the 4 × 400 m relay team to a silver medal performance. At the NCAA Division I Indoor Championships, he finished fifth in the 400 m and seventh in the 4 × 400 m relay. Patterson was named an indoor first-team All-American in both events by the USTFCCCA.

==== 2022 outdoor season ====
At the season opening Texas Relays, Patterson teamed with Dedrick Vanover, Ryan Willie and Jacob Miley to record the second-fastest 4 × 200 m relay time in school history at 1:21.02. On April 1, he ran a personal best time of 20.20 s to win his 200 m heat at the Florida Relays, tying for the NCAA lead and giving him the seventh-best time in school history. Two weeks later, Patterson set a new 100 m personal best in 10.11 s at the Tom Jones Memorial Invitational. He also anchored the 4 × 400 m relay team that clocked a new collegiate record of 2:58.53 to close out the meet. The team of Patterson, Willie, Miley and Champion Allison became the first collegiate team in history to run under 2:59.00.

== Professional career ==
At the 2025 World Athletics Indoor Championships, he won a bronze medal in the individual 400 metres, finishing behind compatriots Brian Faust and Chris Bailey. The trio then teamed up with Elija Godwin to win the gold medal in the men's 4 × 400 metres relay at the championships. In May 2025, he set a new personal best 43.98 seconds to win the 400 metres in the long sprinter category at the Grand Slam Track event in Miami.

In 2025, Patterson was noted for setting the 2025 world lead over 400 metres while working overnight loading trucks for the United Parcel Service.

At the 2025 USA Outdoor Track and Field Championships, he finished first in the 400 meters in front of Chris Bailey and Khaleb McRae, with a time of 44.16 seconds. This secured his spot in the 2025 World Athletics Championships.

He ran a personal best 43.85 seconds for the 400 metres to win the Diamond League Final in Zurich on 28 August.

== Statistics ==
=== Circuit performances ===
Grand Slam Track results
Slam	Race group	Event	Pl.	Time	Prize money
2025 Miami Slam	Long sprints	200 m	6th	20.55	US$50,000
2025 Miami Slam	Long sprints	400 m	1st	43.98	US$50,000

=== Personal bests ===
All information taken from World Athletics profile.

Type	Event	Time	Date	Place	Notes
Outdoor	100 metres	10.11	April 16, 2022	Gainesville, Florida, U.S.	+1.5 m/s (wind)
Outdoor	200 metres	20.20	April 1, 2022	Gainesville, Florida, U.S.	0.0 m/s (wind)
Outdoor	400 metres	43.78	September 4, 2026	Brussels, Belgium	
Outdoor	4 × 100 m relay	37.93	May 13, 2023	Baton Rouge, Louisiana, U.S.	
Outdoor	4 × 200 m relay	1:21.02	March 26, 2022	Austin, Texas, U.S.	
Outdoor	4 × 400 m relay	2:57.74	June 9, 2023	Austin, Texas, U.S.	CR (Note: Shared with Ryan Willie, Jacob Miley, and Champion Allison for the Florida Gators.)
Indoor	60 metres	6.68	January 24, 2022	Clemson, South Carolina, U.S.	
Indoor	200 metres	20.29	February 25, 2023	Fayetteville, Arkansas, U.S.	
Indoor	300 metres	31.99	January 15, 2022	Clemson, South Carolina, U.S.	CR, #8 all-time
Indoor	400 metres	45.05	February 25, 2023	Fayetteville, Arkansas, U.S.	
Indoor	4 × 400 m relay	3:02.18	February 11, 2023	Fayetteville, Arkansas, U.S.	

=== International championships ===
Year	Competition	Venue	Position	Event	Time	Notes
2025	World Indoor Championships	Nanjing, China	3rd	400 m	45.54	
2025	World Indoor Championships	Nanjing, China	1st	4 × 400 m relay	3:03.13	
2025	World Championships	Tokyo, Japan	7th	400 m	44.70	
2025	World Championships	Tokyo, Japan	2nd	4 × 400 m relay	2:57.83	
2026	World Ultimate Championship	Budapest, Hungary	6th	400 m	44.59	

=== National championships ===
Year	Competition	Venue	Position	Event	Time	Wind (m/s)	Notes
2016	USATF Junior Olympics (U17)	Sacramento, California	4th	100 m	10.98	-1.3	
2016	USATF Junior Olympics (U17)	Sacramento, California	2nd	200 m	21.74	-2.1	
2016	USATF Junior Olympics (U17)	Sacramento, California	1st	Long jump	7.18 m	0.0	
2019	NCAA Division I Indoor Championships	Birmingham, Alabama	DNF (h)	400 m	—	—N/a	—N/a
2021	NCAA Division I Indoor Championships	Fayetteville, Arkansas	2nd	400 m	45.14	—	—N/a
2021	NCAA Division I Championships	Eugene, Oregon	DNS (sf)	400 m	—	—N/a	—N/a
2021	U.S. Olympic Trials	Eugene, Oregon	6th (sf)	400 m	45.68	—	—N/a
2022	NCAA Division I Indoor Championships	Birmingham, Alabama	2nd	400 m	45.97	—	—N/a
2022	NCAA Division I Indoor Championships	Birmingham, Alabama	3rd	4 × 400 m relay	3:06.19	—N/a	—N/a
2025	2025 USA Outdoor Track and Field Championships	Eugene, Oregon	1st	400 m	44.16	—	—N/a

== Notes ==
Records
Preceded by Brian Herron	Men's World Under-20 Record Holder, 300 metres January 11, 2019 – present	Incumbent
Preceded by Torrin Lawrence	Men's Collegiate Record Holder, 300 metres January 17, 2020 – present	Incumbent
