= 2025 World Athletics Indoor Championships – Men's 4 × 400 metres relay =

Men's 4 × 400 metres relay at the 2025 World Athletics Indoor Championships
- Venue: Nanjing's Cube at Nanjing Youth Olympic Sports Park
- Location: Nanjing, China
- Dates: 22 March
- Winning time: 3:03.13

Medalists
gold medal	Elija Godwin; Brian Faust; Jacory Patterson; Christopher Bailey	United States
silver medal	Rusheen McDonald; Jasauna Dennis; Kimar Farquharson; Demar Francis	Jamaica
bronze medal	Patrik Simon Enyingi; Zoltán Wahl; Árpád Kovács; Attila Molnár	Hungary

The men's 4 × 400 metres relay at the 2025 World Athletics Indoor Championships took place on the short track of the Nanjing's Cube at Nanjing Youth Olympic Sports Park in Nanjing, China, on 22 March 2025. This was the 21st time the event was contested at the World Athletics Indoor Championships. Athletes could qualify by achieving the entry standard or by their World Athletics Ranking in the event.

== Background ==
The men's 4 × 400 metres relay was contested 17 times before 2025, at every edition of the World Athletics Indoor Championships since 1991.

Records before the 2025 World Athletics Indoor Championships
Record	Athlete (nation)	Time (s)	Location	Date
World record	Poland	3:01.77	Birmingham, United Kingdom	4 March 2018
Championship record	Poland	3:01.77	Birmingham, United Kingdom	4 March 2018
World leading	Netherlands	3:04.95	Apeldoorn, Netherlands	9 March 2025

== Final ==
The final was started at 21:11 (UTC+8).

Place	Lane	Nation	Athletes	Time	Notes
1st place, gold medalist(s)	6	United States	Elija Godwin, Brian Faust, Jacory Patterson, Christopher Bailey	3:03.13	SB
2nd place, silver medalist(s)	5	Jamaica	Rusheen McDonald, Jasauna Dennis, Kimar Farquharson, Demar Francis	3:05.05	SB
3rd place, bronze medalist(s)	4	Hungary	Patrik Simon Enyingi, Zoltán Wahl, Árpád Kovács, Attila Molnár	3:06.03	NR
4	3	China	Zheng Chiyu, Zhang Qining, Xu Xinlong, Ju Tianqi	3:06.90	NR
5	2	Sri Lanka	Kalinga Kumarage, H.D.R Madushan, J.O. Shashintha Silva, S.M.S.V Rajakaruna	3:10.58	NR
