= 2024 World Athletics Indoor Championships – Men's 400 metres =

Men's 400 metres at the 2024 World Athletics Indoor Championships
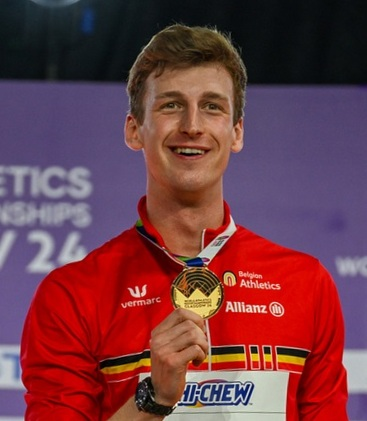
- Venue: Commonwealth Arena
- Dates: 1–2 March
- Competitors: 23 from 19 nations
- Winning time: 45.25 NR

Medalists
gold medal	Alexander Doom	Belgium
silver medal	Karsten Warholm	Norway
bronze medal	Rusheen McDonald	Jamaica

The men's 400 metres at the 2024 World Athletics Indoor Championships took place on 1 and 2 March 2024.

== Results ==
=== Heats ===
Qualification: First 2 in each heat (Q) and the next 4 fastest (q) advance to the Semi-Finals

The heats were started on 1 March at 11:52.

==== Heat 1 ====
Place	Athlete	Nation	Time	Notes
1	Karsten Warholm	Norway	46.68	Q, SB
2	Rok Ferlan	Slovenia	47.04 [.036]	Q
3	Jacory Patterson	United States	47.04 [.038]	
4	Graham Pellegrini	Malta	48.00	
5	Ibrahim Ayorinde	Canada	48.05	
—	Kentaro Sato	Japan	DNS	

==== Heat 2 ====
Place	Athlete	Nation	Time	Notes
1	Matěj Krsek	Czech Republic	46.07	Q
2	Rusheen McDonald	Jamaica	46.25	Q, PB
3	Lucas Carvalho	Brazil	46.82	q, PB
4	FPlaceo Burraj	Albania	46.86	q, SB
5	Tomas Keršulis	Lithuania	47.92	

==== Heat 3 ====
Place	Athlete	Nation	Time	Notes
1	Attila Molnár	Hungary	46.52	Q
2	Dubem Nwachukwu	Nigeria	46.91	Q
3	Omar Elkhatib	Portugal	46.99	q, PB
4	Jereem Richards	Trinidad and Tobago	47.04	q, SB
5	Michal Desenský	Czech Republic	47.48	
6	Rashid Moiwa	Sierra Leone	53.48	NR

==== Heat 4 ====
Place	Athlete	Nation	Time	Notes
1	Alexander Doom	Belgium	46.11	Q
2	João Coelho	Portugal	46.35	Q, NR
3	Brian Faust	United States	47.11	
4	Artūrs Pastors	Latvia	47.53	PB
5	Lucas Vilar	Brazil	47.92	
6	Malique Smith	United States Virgin Islands	49.68	SB

=== Semi-finals ===
Qualification: First 3 in each heat (Q) advance to the final.

The heats were started on 1 March at 21:10.

==== Heat 1 ====
Place	Athlete	Nation	Time	Notes
1	Alexander Doom	Belgium	45.69	Q, PB
2	João Coelho	Portugal	45.98	Q, NR
3	Attila Molnár	Hungary	46.08	Q, NR
4	Jereem Richards	Trinidad and Tobago	46.64	SB
5	Dubem Nwachukwu	Nigeria	46.69	
6	FPlaceo Burraj	Albania	47.78	

==== Heat 2 ====
Place	Athlete	Nation	Time	Notes
1	Karsten Warholm	Norway	45.86	Q, SB
2	Rusheen McDonald	Jamaica	46.02	Q, PB
3	Matěj Krsek	Czech Republic	46.48	Q
4	Rok Ferlan	Slovenia	46.61	PB
5	Lucas Carvalho	Brazil	47.38	
6	Omar Elkhatib	Portugal	47.78	

=== Final ===
The final was started on 2 March at 21:10.

Place	Athlete	Nation	Time	Notes
1st place, gold medalist(s)	Alexander Doom	Belgium	45.25	NR
2nd place, silver medalist(s)	Karsten Warholm	Norway	45.34	SB
3rd place, bronze medalist(s)	Rusheen McDonald	Jamaica	45.65	PB
4	João Coelho	Portugal	45.86	NR
5	Attila Molnár	Hungary	46.11	
6	Matěj Krsek	Czech Republic	46.47	
