= 2025 World Athletics Indoor Championships =

20th World Athletics Indoor Championships
- Edition: 20th
- Dates: 21–23 March 2025
- Host city: Nanjing, China
- Venue: Nanjing's Cube at Nanjing Youth Olympic Sports Park
- Events: 26
- Participation: 517 athletes from 118 nations

The 20th World Athletics Indoor Championships were held from 21 to 23 March 2025 in Nanjing, People's Republic of China, at the newly built Nanjing's Cube gymnasium in the Nanjing Youth Olympic Sports Park.

Nanjing was originally due to host the World Athletics Indoor Championships in 2020, then in 2021, and then again in 2023, but all these dates were cancelled due to COVID-19 pandemic regulations in China. The 2022 edition took place in Belgrade, Serbia, and the 2024 edition in Glasgow, United Kingdom.

== Bidding process ==
On 26 November 2017, delegations from the three candidate cities made their presentations at the 212th IAAF Council Meeting: Nanjing, Serbia's capital Belgrade, and Toruń, Poland. Nanjing won the bid for the 2020 World Athletics Indoor Championships.

== Venue ==
The facility, a brand new purpose-built gymnasium at the Nanjing Youth Olympic Sports Park, known as Nanjing's Cube, was the centrepiece of the event. Construction started in September 2017 and was completed in time for the event. The venue for track and field, along with swimming, were located in Block A of the park, and to the east was the Yangtze River complex. It provided catering and hotels, as well as security work for the event.

== Schedule ==
All times were local (UTC+8).

R1	Round 1	SF	Semi-finals	F	Final
M = morning session, E = evening session

Men
Date →	21 March			22 March			23 March	
Event ↓	M	E		M	E		M	E
60 m	R1	S	F					
400 m	R1	S			F			
800 m	R1			S				F
1500 m		R1						F
3000 m					F			
60 m hurdles				R1	S	F		
4 × 400 m								F
High jump		F						
Pole vault					F			
Long jump								F
Triple jump	F							
Shot put								F
Heptathlon				F				

Women
Date →	21 March		22 March			23 March		
Event ↓	M	E	M	E		M	E	
60 m			R1	S	F			
400 m		S		F				
800 m	R1		S				F	
1500 m		R1					F	
3000 m				F				
60 m hurdles						R1	S	F
4 × 400 m							F	
High jump						F		
Pole vault			F					
Long jump						F		
Triple jump				F				
Shot put		F						
Pentathlon	F							

Event detailed schedule
Day 1 — Friday, 21 March 2025
Time	Event	Gender	Round
10:05	60 metres hurdles	W	Pentathlon
10:23	400 metres	M	Round 1
10:45	High jump	W	Pentathlon
11:05	Triple jump	M	Final
11:15	800 metres	W	Round 1
11:55	800 metres	M	Round 1
12:55	60 metres	M	Round 1
13:15	Shot put	W	Pentathlon
18:30	High jump	M	Final
18:33	1500 metres	W	Round 1
18:42	Long jump	W	Pentathlon
19:18	1500 metres	M	Round 1
19:50	Shot put	W	Final
20:03	60 metres	M	Semi-final
20:26	400 metres	W	Round 1
20:47	400 metres	M	Semi-final
21:15	800 metres	W	Final pentathlon
21:24	60 metres	M	Final
Day 2 — Saturday, 22 March 2025
Time	Event	Gender	Round
10:05	60 metres	M	Heptathlon
10:10	Pole vault	W	Final
10:25	60 metres hurdles	M	Round 1
10:45	Long jump	M	Heptathlon
11:15	60 metres	W	Round 1
12:05	800 metres	W	Semi-final
12:10	Shot put	M	Heptathlon
12:31	800 metres	M	Semi-final
18:34	Pole vault	M	Final
18:37	High jump	M	Heptathlon
19:10	3000 metres	W	Final
19:15	Triple jump	W	Final
19:33	3000 metres	M	Final
19:50	60 metres hurdles	M	Semi-final
20:15	60 metres	W	Semi-final
20:44	400 metres	W	Final
20:55	400 metres	M	Final
21:05	60 metres hurdles	M	Final
21:18	60 metres	W	Final
Day 3 — Sunday, 23 March 2025
Time	Event	Gender	Round
10:05	60 metres hurdles	M	Heptathlon
10:19	Long jump	W	Final
10:25	60 metres hurdles	W	Round 1
11:10	Pole vault	M	Heptathlon
11:35	High jump	W	Final
19:35	60 metres hurdles	W	Semi-final
19:38	Shot put	M	Final
19:40	Long jump	M	Final
20:02	1000 metres	M	Final heptathlon
20:15	1500 metres	M	Final
20:28	1500 metres	W	Final
20:40	800 metres	M	Final
20:54	800 metres	W	Final
21:01	60 metres hurdles	W	Final
21:11	4 x 400 metres relay	M	Final
21:21	4 x 400 metres relay	W	Final

== Medal table ==
* Host nation (China)

Rank	Nation	Gold	Silver	Bronze	Total
1	United States	6	4	6	16
2	Norway	3	0	1	4
3	Ethiopia	2	2	0	4
4	Great Britain	2	1	1	4
5	Italy	2	1	0	3
6	Australia	1	2	4	7
7	Switzerland	1	2	1	4
8	Cuba	1	1	0	2
8	France	1	1	0	2
8	New Zealand	1	1	0	2
11	South Africa	1	0	1	2
12	Bahamas	1	0	0	1
12	Canada	1	0	0	1
12	Finland	1	0	0	1
12	South Korea	1	0	0	1
12	Sweden	1	0	0	1
17	Jamaica	0	2	2	4
18	China*	0	1	1	2
19	Belgium	0	1	0	1
19	Estonia	0	1	0	1
19	Greece	0	1	0	1
19	Ireland	0	1	0	1
19	Netherlands	0	1	0	1
19	Poland	0	1	0	1
19	Slovenia	0	1	0	1
26	Spain	0	0	3	3
27	Burkina Faso	0	0	1	1
27	Germany	0	0	1	1
27	Hungary	0	0	1	1
27	Luxembourg	0	0	1	1
27	Portugal	0	0	1	1
27	Ukraine	0	0	1	1
Totals (32 entries)		26	25	26	77

== Placing table ==
United States won the placing table.

Rank	Country	1st place, gold medalist(s)	2nd place, silver medalist(s)	3rd place, bronze medalist(s)	4	5	6	7	8	Medals	Points
1	United States	6	4	6	4	6	3	4	2	16	175
2	Australia	1	2	4	1	1	0	0	0	7	55
3	Ethiopia	2	3	0	0	1	1	0	0	5	44
3	China	0	1	1	3	2	1	1	3	2	44
5	Italy	2	1	0	2	0	1	2	2	3	42
6	Jamaica	0	2	2	1	1	1	1	1	4	41
7	Great Britain	2	1	1	1	1	0	0	0	4	38
8	Switzerland	1	2	1	1	0	0	0	0	4	33
9	Norway	3	0	1	0	0	0	1	0	4	32
10	Poland	0	1	0	2	2	0	1	0	1	27

== Medal summary ==
=== Men ===
Event	Gold		Silver		Bronze	
60 metres	Jeremiah Azu; Great Britain	6.49 =PB	Lachlan Kennedy; Australia	6.50	Akani Simbine; South Africa	6.54
400 metres	Christopher Bailey; United States	45.08	Brian Faust; United States	45.47 =PB	Jacory Patterson; United States	45.54
800 metres	Josh Hoey; United States	1:44.77	Eliott Crestan; Belgium	1:44.81	Elvin Josué Canales; Spain	1:45.03
1500 metres	Jakob Ingebrigtsen; Norway	3:38.79	Neil Gourley; Great Britain	3:39.07	Luke Houser; United States	3:39.17
3000 metres	Jakob Ingebrigtsen; Norway	7:46.09 SB	Berihu Aregawi; Ethiopia	7:46.25 SB	Ky Robinson; Australia	7:47.09
60 metres hurdles	Grant Holloway; United States	7.42	Wilhem Belocian; France	7.54	Liu Junxi; China	7.55
4 × 400 metres relay	United States; Elija Godwin; Brian Faust; Jacory Patterson; Christopher Bailey	3:03.13 SB	Jamaica; Rusheen McDonald; Jasauna Dennis; Kimar Farquharson; Demar Francis	3:05.05 SB	Hungary; Patrik Simon Enyingi; Zoltán Wahl; Árpád Kovács; Attila Molnár	3:06.03 NR
High jump	Woo Sang-hyeok; South Korea	2.31 m =SB	Hamish Kerr; New Zealand	2.28 m	Raymond Richards; Jamaica	2.28 m
Pole vault	Armand Duplantis; Sweden	6.15 m	Emmanouil Karalis; Greece	6.05 m NR	Sam Kendricks; United States	5.90 m =SB
Long jump	Mattia Furlani; Italy	8.30 m	Wayne Pinnock; Jamaica	8.29 m SB	Liam Adcock; Australia	8.28 m
Triple jump^{[a]}	Andy Díaz; Italy	17.80 m WL	Zhu Yaming; China	17.33 m SB	Hugues Fabrice Zango; Burkina Faso	17.15 m SB
Shot put	Tom Walsh; New Zealand	21.65 m SB	Roger Steen; United States	21.62 m SB	Adrian Piperi; United States	21.48 m
Heptathlon	Sander Skotheim; Norway	6475 pts	Johannes Erm; Estonia	6437 pts NR	Till Steinforth; Germany	6275 pts
WR world record | AR area record | CR championship record | GR games record | NR national record | OR Olympic record | PB personal best | SB season best | WL world leading (in a given season)

- ^{triple jump} Almir dos Santos of Brazil originally won the bronze medal, but was disqualified for wearing non-regulation shoes.

=== Women ===
Event	Gold		Silver		Bronze	
60 metres	Mujinga Kambundji; Switzerland	7.04	Zaynab Dosso; Italy	7.06	Patrizia van der Weken; Luxembourg	7.07
400 metres	Amber Anning; Great Britain	50.60	Alexis Holmes; United States	50.63	Henriette Jæger; Norway	50.92
800 metres	Prudence Sekgodiso; South Africa	1:58.40 WL	Nigist Getachew; Ethiopia	1:59.63 PB	Patricia Silva; Portugal	1:59.80 NR
1500 metres^{[a]}	Gudaf Tsegay; Ethiopia	3:54.86 CR	Vacant		Georgia Hunter Bell; Great Britain	3:59.84 PB
3000 metres	Freweyni Hailu; Ethiopia	8:37.21	Shelby Houlihan; United States	8:38.26	Jessica Hull; Australia	8:38.28
60 metres hurdles	Devynne Charlton; Bahamas	7.72 SB	Ditaji Kambundji; Switzerland	7.73	Ackera Nugent; Jamaica	7.74 SB
4 × 400 metres relay	United States; Quanera Hayes; Bailey Lear; Rosey Effiong; Alexis Holmes	3:27.45	Poland; Justyna Święty-Ersetic; Aleksandra Formella; Anastazja Kuś; Anna Gryc	3:32.05 SB	Australia; Ellie Beer; Ella Connolly; Bella Pasquali; Jemma Pollard	3:32.65 SB
High jump	Nicola Olyslagers; Australia	1.97 m SB	Eleanor Patterson; Australia	1.97 m	Yaroslava Mahuchikh; Ukraine	1.95 m
Pole vault	Marie-Julie Bonnin; France	4.75 m =NR	Tina Šutej; Slovenia	4.70 m	Angelica Moser; Switzerland	4.70 m
Long jump	Claire Bryant; United States	6.96 m PB	Annik Kälin; Switzerland	6.83 m	Fátima Diame; Spain	6.72 m
Triple jump	Leyanis Pérez Hernández; Cuba	14.93 m WL	Liadagmis Povea; Cuba	14.57 m =SB	Ana Peleteiro-Compaoré; Spain	14.29 m
Shot put	Sarah Mitton; Canada	20.48 m	Jessica Schilder; Netherlands	20.07 m	Chase Jackson; United States	20.06 m
Pentathlon	Saga Vanninen; Finland	4821 pts	Kate O'Connor; Ireland	4742 pts	Taliyah Brooks; United States	4669 pts PB
WR world record | AR area record | CR championship record | GR games record | NR national record | OR Olympic record | PB personal best | SB season best | WL world leading (in a given season)

- ^{1500m} Diribe Welteji of Ethiopia originally won the silver medal, but was disqualified due to anti-doping violations.

== Qualification ==
The qualification period for all events ran from 1 September 2024 to 9 March 2025 (midnight Monaco time). Athletes could qualify by achieving the Entry Standard within the qualification period or by World Indoor Tour Wildcard, or by virtue of their position in the World Rankings as of 9 March 2025 to complete, where necessary, the target number of athletes in each event. In total no more than two male and two female athletes from any one Member were invited. The winners of the World Indoor tour received wildcards to the championships, allowing nations with wildcards to enter up to 3 athletes into individual events.

Entry Standards and target numbers of athletes / teams per event
Event	Women		Men		Quota
Event	Indoor	Outdoor	Indoor	Outdoor	Quota
60 metres	7.15	10.90 for 100 m	6.55	9.92 for 100 m	56
400 metres	51.00	51.00	45.20	45.20	30
800 metres	2:00.00	2:00.00	1:45.00	1:45.00	30
1500 metres (Mile)	4:03.00 (4:22.50)	4:03.00 (4:22.50)	3:33.50 (3:50.50)	3:33.50 (3:50.50)	30
3000 metres (5000 metres)	8:33.00	8:33.00 (14:25.00)	7:31.00	7:31.00 (12:45.00)	15
60 m hurdles	7.94	100 mH	7.57	110 mH	48
High jump	1.97 m (6 ft 5 1/2 in)		2.34 m (7 ft 8 in)		12
Pole vault	4.75 m (15 ft 7 in)		5.85 m (19 ft 2 1/4 in)		12
Long jump	6.90 m (22 ft 7 1/2 in)		8.26 m (27 ft 1 in)		16
Triple jump	14.60 m (47 ft 10 3/4 in)		17.40 m (57 ft 1 in)		16
Shot put	19.50 m (63 ft 11 1/2 in)		22.00 m (72 ft 2 in)		16
Combined events	see above				14
Relays	see above				

== Participating nations ==
576 athletes from 127 countries were entered. Of that number 517 athletes from 118 countries actually got to compete.

- Algeria (1)
- Angola (1)
- Antigua and Barbuda (1)
- Argentina (1)
- Armenia (1)
- Australia (20)
- Austria (2)
- Bahamas (5)
- Bangladesh (1)
- Barbados (4)
- Belgium (4)
- Benin (1)
- Bolivia (1)
- Brazil (17)
- British Virgin Islands (2)
- Bulgaria (2)
- Burkina Faso (2)
- Canada (14)
- Chile (2)
- China (32)
- Chinese Taipei (1)
- Cook Islands (1)
- Croatia (2)
- Cuba (3)
- Cyprus (1)
- Czech Republic (10)
- Denmark (2)
- Dominica (1)
- Egypt (3)
- Eritrea (1)
- Estonia (5)
- Eswatini (1)
- Ethiopia (12)
- Federated States of Micronesia (1)
- Fiji (1)
- Finland (5)
- France (9)
- French Polynesia (1)
- Georgia (1)
- Germany (8)
- Great Britain (11)
- Greece (5)
- Guam (1)
- Honduras (1)
- Hong Kong (1)
- Hungary (11)
- Iran (1)
- Ireland (6)
- Israel (2)
- Italy (21)
- Ivory Coast (2)
- Jamaica (20)
- Japan (13)
- Kenya (9)
- Kiribati (1)
- Kuwait (2)
- Kyrgyzstan (1)
- Laos (1)
- Latvia (3)
- Liberia (1)
- Lithuania (2)
- Luxembourg (2)
- Macau (1)
- Madagascar (1)
- Maldives (1)
- Mali (1)
- Malta (1)
- Mauritius (1)
- Morocco (3)
- Mozambique (1)
- Nauru (1)
- Nepal (1)
- Netherlands (6)
- New Zealand (11)
- Niger (1)
- Nigeria (1)
- Norway (4)
- Oman (1)
- Papua New Guinea (1)
- Paraguay (1)
- Peru (1)
- Philippines (1)
- Poland (13)
- Portugal (7)
- Puerto Rico (3)
- Qatar (1)
- Republic of the Congo (1)
- Romania (5)
- Rwanda (1)
- Saint Lucia (1)
- Saint Vincent and the Grenadines (1)
- El Salvador (1)
- Samoa (1)
- Senegal (1)
- Serbia (6)
- Seychelles (1)
- Singapore (1)
- Slovakia (5)
- Slovenia (6)
- Solomon Islands (1)
- South Africa (4)
- South Korea (1)
- Spain (12)
- Sri Lanka (10)
- Sweden (11)
- Switzerland (11)
- Tajikistan (1)
- Tonga (1)
- Trinidad and Tobago (2)
- Turkey (4)
- Turkmenistan (1)
- Uganda (2)
- Ukraine (7)
- United States (50)
- Uruguay (1)
- Uzbekistan (1)
- Vanuatu (1)
- Zimbabwe (1)
