= Boško Kijanović =

Serbian sprinter (born 2000)

Personal information
- Nationality: Serbian
- Born: 21 June 2000 (age 26)

Sport
- Country: Serbia
- Sport: Athletics
- Event: Sprint

Achievements and titles
- Personal bests: 200m: 20.70 (2022) NR; 400m: 45.50 (2023)

Boško Kijanović (born 21 June 2000) is a Serbian sprinter. He has won multiple national titles and is the national record holder over 200 metres and 400 metres indoors. He has competed for Serbia at the World Athletics Championships and World Athletics Indoor Championships.

== Biography ==
He set a Serbian indoor national record of 46.22 seconds for the 400 metres competing in Belgrade in March 2022. He competed at his home-staged 2022 World Athletics Indoor Championships in Belgrade, in the 400 metres. He set a Serbian U23 national record of 45.72 seconds for the 400 metres in May 2022. In June 2022, he won the national title at the Serbian Athletics Championships in Kruševac over 200 metres in a time of 20.70 seconds, breaking the national record which had been held since 1984 by Mladen Nikolić, and winning the race by over a second from his nearest competitor.

He competed at the 2022 World Athletics Championships in Eugene, Oregon over 400 metres. He reached the semi-finals at the 2022 European Athletics Championships in Munich, Germany over 400 metres.

In July 2023, he won the Serbian Athletics Championships in Kraljevo, in over both the 200 metres and 400 metres.

In August 2024, he ran 10.31 seconds for the 100 metres. He won the indoor Serbian national 400 metres title at the Serbian Indoor Athletics Championships in February 2025. He competed at the 2025 European Athletics Indoor Championships in Apeldoorn, Netherlands, but did not qualify for the semi-finals of the 400 metres. Later that month, he competed at the 2025 World Athletics Indoor Championships in Nanjing, China in the 400 metres, where he reached the semi-finals.

In March 2026, he reached the semi-finals of the 400 metres at the 2026 World Athletics Indoor Championships in Toruń, Poland.

== International competitions ==
Year	Competition	Venue	Position	Event	Notes
Representing Serbia
2025	World Indoor Championships	Nanjing, China	8th	400m	46.62

== Personal life ==
His is from Belgrade. His is brother, Aleksa Kijanović, is also a sprinter who has won Serbian national championships.
