= Christopher Bailey (runner) =

American athlete

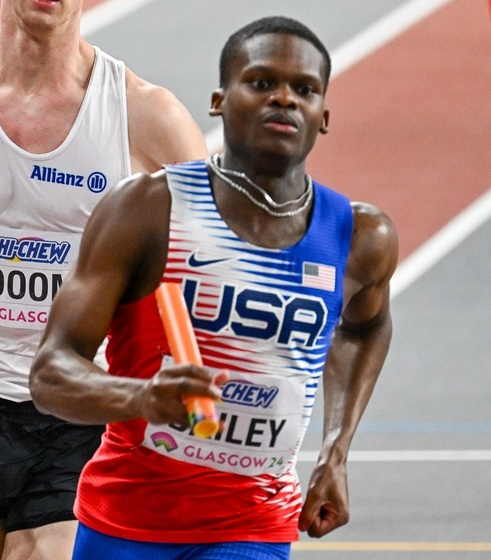
- Bailey in 2024

Personal information
- Nationality: United States
- Born: May 29, 2000 (age 26) Atlanta, Georgia, U.S.
- Education: University of Tennessee '22 BS Kinesiology; University of Arkansas '24 MS Operations Management

Sport
- Sport: Athletics

Achievements and titles
- Personal bests: 200 m: 21.58 (Starkville, 2019); 400 m: 43.97 (Brussels, 2026); 800 m: 1:49.82 (Palo Alto, 2023)
Medal record
Men's athletics
Representing the United States
Olympic Games
Gold medal – first place	2024 Paris	4 × 400 m relay
World Championships
Gold medal – first place	2023 Budapest	4 × 400 m relay
Silver medal – second place	2025 Tokyo	4 × 400 m relay
World Ultimate Championship
First place	2026 Budapest	4 × 400 m mixed
World Indoor Championships
Gold medal – first place	2025 Nanjing	400 m
Gold medal – first place	2025 Nanjing	4 × 400 m relay
Silver medal – second place	2024 Glasgow	4 × 400 m relay

Christopher Bailey (born May 29, 2000) is an American track and field athlete. He has won gold medals at the Olympic Games, the World Athletics Championships and World Athletics Indoors Championships.

== Early life ==
From Atlanta, Georgia he attended Carver High School, Mississippi Valley State University, and the University of Tennessee, before attending the University of Arkansas.

== Career ==
=== 2023: World Championships medalist ===
In January 2023, Bailey set a new Arkansas Razorbacks College record over 400 m of 45:09 to break the previous record of 45:29 set in 2005 by Terry Gatson. Bailey won the NCAA Indoors 4 × 400 m title as part of the Arkansas Razorbacks in March 2023 in Albuquerque, New Mexico.

Competing at the 2023 USA Outdoor Track and Field Championships, Bailey qualified fastest from the 400 m heats. He then reached the final with the fifth fastest time. He was selected for the 2023 World Athletics Championships in Budapest in August 2023, winning a gold medal as part of the men's 4 × 400 metres relay team, running the preliminary round although not the final.

=== 2024: Olympic Games medalist ===
He was a silver medalist running the anchor leg for the American 4 × 400 m relay team at the 2024 World Athletics Indoor Championships in Glasgow in March 2024.

In April 2024, he was selected as part of the American team for the 2024 World Athletics Relays in Nassau, Bahamas. He competed at the 2024 Summer Olympics over 400 metres in August 2024, qualifying for the final and placing sixth overall. He also competed in the men's 4 × 400 m relay at the Games, winning the gold medal with the American relay team.

=== 2025: World Indoor Champion ===
He won the 400 metres at the 2025 USA Indoor Track and Field Championships. He was selected for the 2025 World Athletics Indoor Championships in Nanjing in March 2025, where he led a clean sweep for the USA of the medals in the individual 400 metres, winning the gold ahead of compatriots Brian Faust and Jacory Patterson.

He won the opening Grand Slam Track race in the Long Sprints category at the inaugural slam in Kingston, Jamaica on 4 April 2025, running 44.34 for the 400 metres. He ran a personal best 44.27 seconds to finish second in the 400 metres at the 2025 Xiamen Diamond League event in China, in April 2025. Competing at the 2025 Shanghai Diamond League on 3 May 2025, he won the men's 400 m in 44.17 seconds. He ran a personal best 44.15 seconds at the 2025 Prefontaine Classic on 5 July. On 2 August, he finished second at the 2025 USA Outdoor Track and Field Championships in 44.43 seconds. He placed fifth in the 400 metres at the Diamond League Final in Zurich on 28 August.

In September 2025, he competed at the 2025 World Athletics Championships in Tokyo, Japan, reaching the semi-finals of the men's 400 metres. He later won a silver medal in the men's 4 × 400 metres relay. Initially, his American team had not qualified for the final but the handover between his teammates Bryce Deadmon and Demarius Smith was adjudged to have been impacted by a runner for Zambia, and they were put forward for a run-off with the same team in the same lanes against Kenya, who had also been impacted. He ran as they won the run-off on the morning of the final, with a time of 2:58.48, before a different quartet ran the final later that day, placing second behind Botswana.

=== 2026: American champion ===
Bailey ran 44.70 seconds to place fourth in the 400 metre at the 2026 Xiamen Diamond League. On 6 June, he ran 44.35 seconds to win at the USATF Lone Star Grand Prix in College Station, Texas, before later winning the LA Grand Prix in 44.57 seconds the following week. On 28 June, he placed finished third with 44.06 seconds as Collen Kebinatshipi broke the Diamond League record in the 400 metres at the 2026 Meeting de Paris. On 4 July, Bailey placed third in the 400 m at the 2026 Prefontaine Classic. On 25 July, he won the 400 metres at the 2026 USA Championships in New York, running 44.39 seconds. At the 2026 Diamond League Final in Brussels on 4 September, Bailey broke 44 seconds for the first time, running a new personal best of 43.97 seconds to place fourth. It was just the second 400 m race in which four men ran under 44 seconds, after the 2024 Olympic final. The following week, he ran 44.27 seconds to place fourth at the inaugural World Ultimate Championship in Budapest. On the final day of the championship, Bailey was a member of the American team that won the mixed 4 × 400 metres relay.

== Results ==
Year	Championships	Venue	Event	Place	Time
2021	NCAA Indoor Championships	Randall Tyson Track Center	4 × 400 m	3rd	3:04.10
2021	NCAA Outdoor Championships	Hayward Field	400 m	SF3 5th	46.83
2021	NCAA Outdoor Championships	Hayward Field	4 × 400 m	SF3 4th	3:07.95
2021	US Outdoor Championships	Hayward Field	400 m	H3 7th	46.29
2022	NCAA Indoor Championships	Birmingham CrossPlex	4 × 400 m	5th	3:05.89
2022	NCAA Outdoor Championships	Hayward Field	4 × 400 m	SF3 3rd	3:03.54
2023	NCAA Indoor Championships	Albuquerque Convention Center	400 m	5th	45.32
2023	NCAA Indoor Championships	Albuquerque Convention Center	4 × 400 m	1st	3:02.09
2023	NCAA Outdoor Championships	Mike A. Myers Stadium	400 m	SF1 4th	45.55
2023	NCAA Outdoor Championships	Mike A. Myers Stadium	4 × 400 m	8th	3:03.66
2023	US Outdoor Championships	Hayward Field	400 m	7th	45.25
2023	World Championships	National Athletics Centre	4 × 400 m relay	H1 1st	2:58.47
2024	US Indoor Championships	Albuquerque Convention Center	400 m	3rd	45.76
2024	World Indoor Championships	Commonwealth Arena	4 × 400 m relay	2nd	3:02.60
2024	Olympic Games	Stade de France	4 × 400 m relay	1st	2:54.43 OR
2025	World Indoor Championships	Nanjing's Cube	400 m	1st	45.08
2025	World Indoor Championships	Nanjing's Cube	4 × 400 m relay	1st	3:03.13

=== Circuit performances ===
Grand Slam Track results
Slam	Race group	Event	Pl.	Time	Prize money
2025 Kingston Slam	Long sprints	400 m	1st	44.34	US$50,000
2025 Kingston Slam	Long sprints	200 m	5th	20.93	US$50,000
