= Demar Francis =

Jamaican athlete (born 2001)

Personal information
- Nationality: Jamaican
- Born: 25 January 2001 (age 25)

Sport
- Sport: Athletics
- Event: Sprint

Achievements and titles
- Personal bests: 200m: 20.28 (Waco, 2024)
Medal record
Men's athletics
Representing Jamaica
World Indoor Championships
Silver medal – second place	2025 Nanjing	4x400 m relay
Bronze medal – third place	2026 Toruń	4×400 m relay
NACAC U23 Championships
Silver medal – second place	2023 San Jose	200m

Demar Francis (born 25 January 2001) is a Jamaican sprinter.

== Early life ==
He attended Excelsior High School and the University of South Dakota before transferring to Baylor University.

== Career ==
He won gold in the 200 metres at the 2023 NACAC U23 Championships in Costa Rica.

He became Jamaica's national indoor record holder in the 200m with a run of 20.46 in 2023. He lowered it again to 20.42 at the Big 12 Indoor Championships in February 2024.

He won a silver medal in the men's 4 x 400 metres relay at the 2025 World Athletics Indoor Championships in Nanjing. On 24 April 2025, he was named in the Jamaican team for the 2025 World Athletics Relays in Guangzhou, China in May 2025. He competed in the Men's 4 × 400 metres relay at the event in May 2025. He also competed in the Mixed 4 × 400 metres relay at the event.

On 22 March 2026, he ran in the heats at the 2026 World Athletics Indoor Championships in Toruń, Poland, of the men's 4 x 400 metres with the team later winning the bronze medal. He was named in the Jamaica team for the 2026 Central American and Caribbean Games.
