= Brian Faust =

American athlete

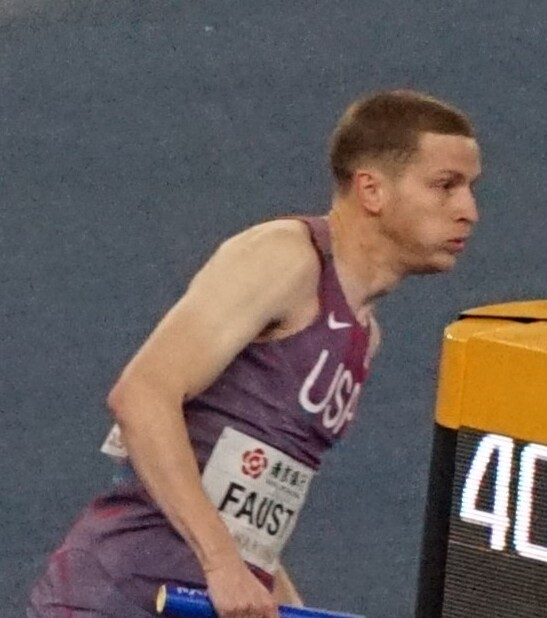
- Faust at the 2025 World Indoor Championships

Personal information
- Nationality: United States
- Born: Brian Faust; January 22, 1999 (age 27) Atlanta, Georgia, U.S.
- Education: Marist School (Georgia) '17; Purdue University '21; University of Kentucky '23

Sport
- Sport: Athletics
- Event: 400 m

Achievements and titles
- Personal bests: 400 m: 45.47 (Albuquerque, 2024)
Medal record
Men's athletics
Representing the United States
World Indoor Championships
Gold medal – first place	2025 Nanjing	4 × 400 m relay
Silver medal – second place	2025 Nanjing	400 m
World Relays
Gold medal – first place	2026 Gaborone	Mixed 4 × 400 m relay

Brian Faust (born January 12, 1999) is an American track and field athlete. He won the 2024 USA Indoor Track and Field Championships, and the silver medal at the 2025 World Athletics Indoor Championships over 400 metres.

== Biography ==
=== Collegiate career ===
Faust competed collegiately for Purdue Boilermakers between 2018 and 2021. He earned All-America and All-Southeastern Conference honors in 2023 while at University of Kentucky.

=== Senior career ===
Faust won the 2024 USA Indoor Track and Field Championships in 2024 over 400 metres. He was subsequently selected for the 2024 World Athletics Indoor Championships in Glasgow, Scotland where he did not qualify from the heats of the men's 400 metres.

Competing in Karlsruhe on 7 February 2025 he won over 400 m in a time of 46.03. He was awarded a wild card place for the 2025 World Athletics Indoor Championships in Nanjing, China, for his performances on the 2025 World Athletics Indoor Tour. At the championships, he won a silver medal in the individual 400 metres, finishing runner-up to compatriot Chris Bailey. The pair teamed up with third placed Jacory Patterson as well as Elija Godwin, to win gold in the men's 4 × 400 metres relay.

Faust was named in the United States team for the 2026 World Athletics Relays in Gaborone, Botswana. He ran as part of the mixed 4 x 400 metres relay team which won their heat on the opening day.
