= Torrin Lawrence =

American sprinter (1989–2014)

Personal information
- Nationality: American
- Born: April 11, 1989
- Died: July 28, 2014 (aged 25) near Cordele, Georgia
- Height: 6 ft 2 in (188 cm)
- Weight: 176 lb (80 kg)

Sport
- Sport: Running
- Events: 100 metres, 200 metres, 400 metres
- College team: University of Georgia

Achievements and titles
- Personal bests: 100m: 10.40 200m: 20.55 (+0.7 m/s): 20.51w (+2.8 m/s); 400m: 45.03
Medal record
Men's athletics
Representing the United States
NCAA Indoor Track and Field Championship
Gold medal – first place	2010	400 m

Torrin Lawrence (April 11, 1989 – July 28, 2014) was an American sprinter who competed in the 400 meters. He ran for the University of Georgia.

== Career ==
Torrin attended Andrew Jackson High School in Jacksonville, Florida, though he did not start competing in track and field until his junior year.

- Lawrence ran the three fastest indoor 400m times in the world in 2010 with his 45.03 clocking at the Tyson Invitational, his 45.10 at the SEC Men's Indoor Championships, and his 45.23 at NCAAs. His 45.03 is the seventh fastest indoor 400m in history.
- Lawrence held the NCAA record in the indoor 300m, having run 32.32 at the 2010 Hokie Invitational, which was the fifth fastest time in history. The record stood until 2020, when Jacory Patterson ran 32.28 at the Hokie Invitational.

At the 2010 NCAA Men's Indoor Track and Field Championships, Lawrence won the 400m title, clocking a 45.23. Lawrence was named the 2010 National Male Track Athlete of the Year by the U.S. Track and Field Cross Country Coaches Association.

== Death ==
Lawrence died after a tractor-trailer collided with his car on I-75 near Cordele, Georgia, early in the morning of July 28, 2014. Lawrence's car suffered a blowout and came to rest in the traffic lane of I-75 south near exit 94. Lawrence was awaiting assistance from a deputy, when the tractor-trailer hit his car. Lawrence was thrown from the vehicle and killed.

== Personal bests ==
Event	Time	Venue	Date
Outdoor
100 m	10.40 NWI	Jacksonville	April 10, 2008
200 m	20.51 (+2.8 m/s)	Gainesville	June 4, 2012
400 m	45.32	Kortrijk	July 12, 2014
Indoor
300 m	32.32	Blacksburg	January 22, 2010
400 m	45.03	Fayetteville	February 12, 2010
