= Jasauna Dennis =

Jamaican athlete (born 2004)

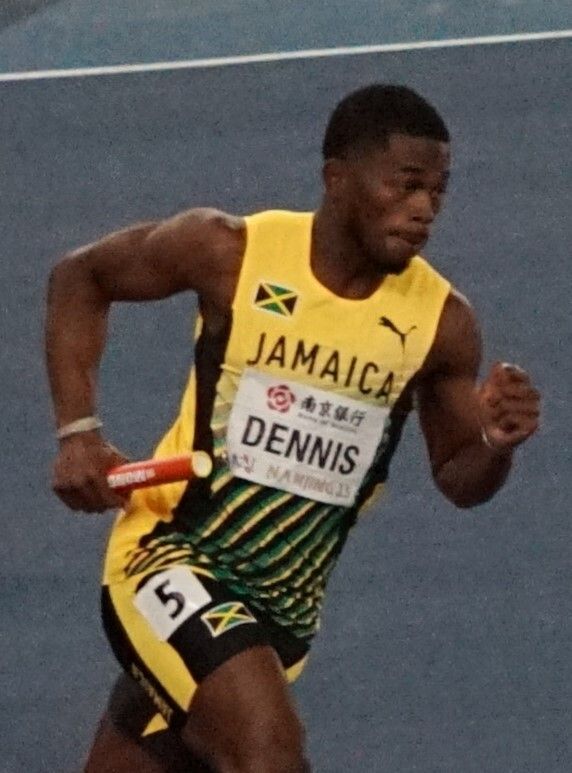
- Dennis at the 2025 World Indoor Championships

Personal information
- Born: 30 December 2004 (age 21)

Sport
- Sport: Athletics
- Event: 400m

Achievements and titles
- Personal best: 400m: 45.38 (2024)
Medal record
Men's athletics
Representing Jamaica
World Indoor Championships
Silver medal – second place	2025 Nanjing	4×400 m relay
World U20 Championships
Silver medal – second place	2022 Cali	4×400 m relay
Bronze medal – third place	2022 Cali	Mixed relay
Junior Pan American Games
Gold medal – first place	2025 Asunción	400 m
Silver medal – second place	2025 Asunción	4×400 m relay
NACAC U23 Championships
Gold medal – first place	2026 Tlaxcala	400 m

Jasauna Dennis (born 30 December 2004) is a Jamaican sprinter.

== Early life ==
He attended St. Elizabeth Technical High School in Saint Elizabeth Parish, Jamaica.

== Career ==
He won a silver medal in the men's 4 x 400 metres relay, and a bronze medal in the mixed 4 x 400 metres relay at the 2022 World Athletics U20 Championships in Cali, Colombia. He won the individual U20 400 metres at the 2023 CARIFTA Games in Nassau, Bahamas in April 2023. In 2024, he ran a personal best outdoors of 45.38 seconds.

Competing for the University of South Carolina, he ran an indoor personal best of 46.32 at the SEC Indoor Championships preliminaries on 1 March 2025. He then lowered it again to 46.02 later-on at the meet.

He won a silver medal in the men's 4 x 400 metres relay at the 2025 World Athletics Indoor Championships in Nanjing. Dennis won the gold medal in the men's 400 meters at the 2025 Junior Pan American Games in Asunción, Paraguay, with a time of 45.56 seconds to set a new junior Pan American record. He was selected for the Jamaican relay team for the 2025 World Athletics Championships in Tokyo, Japan. He ran as the Jamaican team reached the final of the men's 4 x 400 metres relay. That year, he signed an NIL contract with sportswear brand Puma.
