= 2024 World Athletics Indoor Championships =

- Organisers: World Athletics
- Edition: 19th
- Dates: 1–3 March
- Host city: Glasgow, United Kingdom
- Venue: Commonwealth Arena
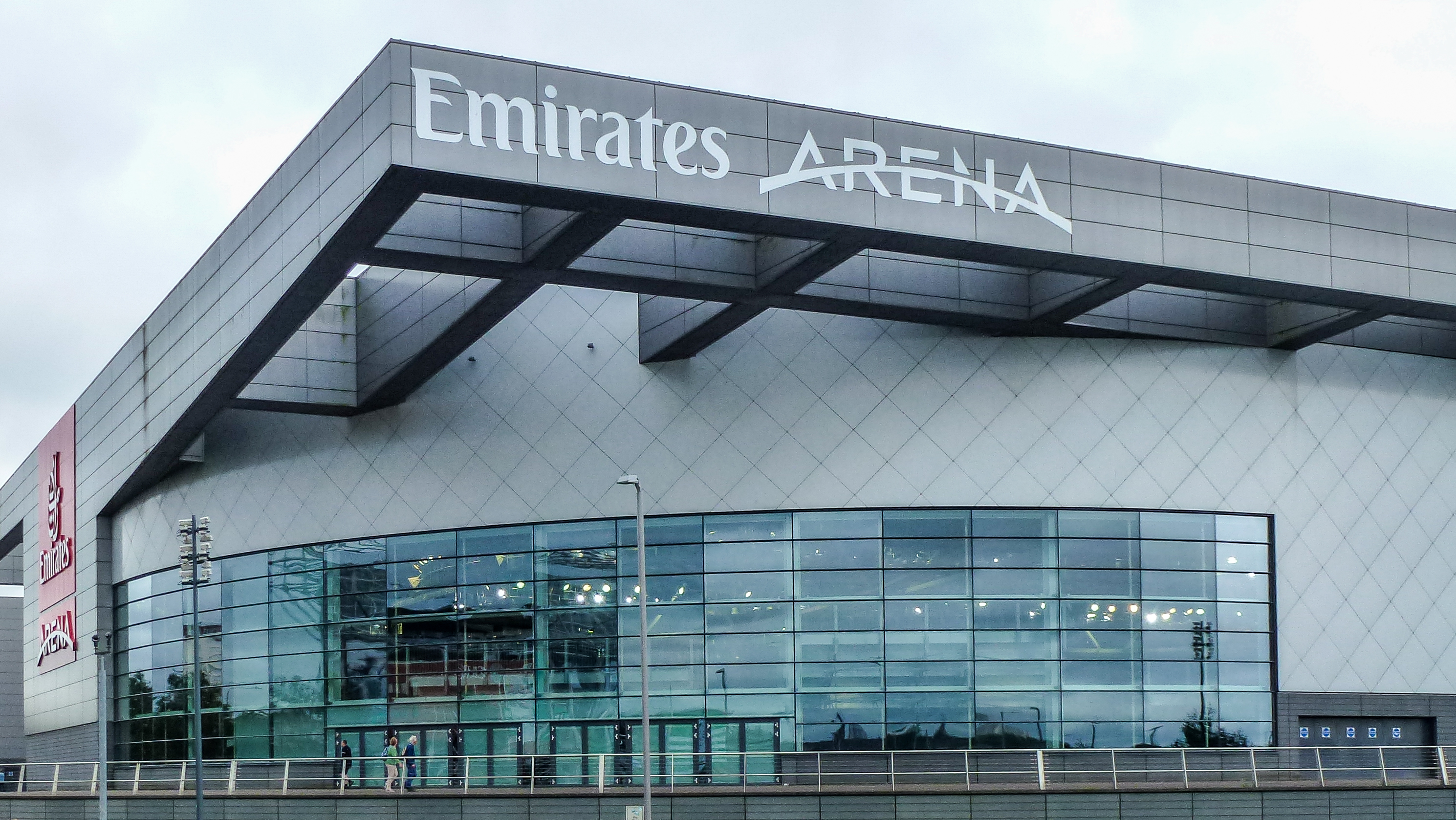
- Level: Senior
- Type: Indoor
- Events: 26
- Participation: 587 athletes from 127 nations
- Official website: Glasgow 2024

The 2024 World Athletics Indoor Championships was the 19th edition of the international indoor track and field competition, organised by the World Athletics. The event was held between 1–3 March at the Commonwealth Arena in Glasgow, United Kingdom.

It was the third time, after Birmingham 2003 and 2018, that the World Indoor Championships were held in the United Kingdom, and the first time in Scotland. Glasgow hosted the European Athletics Indoor Championships in 1990 and 2019, and as in the latter, the competitions again took place at the Commonwealth Arena.

The event was five months before the 2024 Summer Olympics and was a part of the qualification process.

== Bidding process ==
Bidding began in March 2021 with final presentations in the autumn that year. Glasgow, Toruń of Poland and Almaty in Kazakhstan submitted bids to host the 2024 World Athletics Indoor Championships. On 1 December 2021, at their meeting in Monaco, the World Athletics Council chose Glasgow to host the 19th edition of championships.

== Schedule ==
All times are local (UTC±0).

Q	Qualification	H	Heats	R1	Round 1	S	Semi-finals	F	Final
M = morning session, E = evening session

Men
Date →	1 March			2 March			3 March	
Event ↓	M	E		M	E		M	E
60 m	H	S	F					
400 m	H	S			F			
800 m	H			S				F
1500 m		R1						F
3000 m					F			
60 m hurdles				H	S	F		
4 × 400 m							R1	F
High jump							F	
Pole vault								F
Long jump				F				
Triple jump					F			
Shot put		F						
Heptathlon				F				

Women
Date →	1 March		2 March			3 March		
Event ↓	M	E	M	E		M	E	
60 m			H	S	F			
400 m	H	S		F				
800 m	H		S				F	
1500 m		R1					F	
3000 m				F				
60 m hurdles						H	S	F
4 × 400 m						R1	F	
High jump		F						
Pole vault				F				
Long jump							F	
Triple jump						F		
Shot put	F							
Pentathlon	F							

== Medal table ==
* Host nation (Great Britain)

Rank	Nation	Gold	Silver	Bronze	Total
1	United States	6	9	5	20
2	Belgium	3	0	1	4
3	New Zealand	2	2	0	4
4	Netherlands	2	1	2	5
5	Ethiopia	2	1	1	4
5	Great Britain*	2	1	1	4
7	Sweden	1	1	0	2
8	Greece	1	0	1	2
9	Australia	1	0	0	1
9	Bahamas	1	0	0	1
9	Burkina Faso	1	0	0	1
9	Canada	1	0	0	1
9	Dominica	1	0	0	1
9	Saint Lucia	1	0	0	1
9	Switzerland	1	0	0	1
16	Italy	0	2	2	4
17	Norway	0	2	0	2
18	France	0	1	1	2
18	Poland	0	1	1	2
20	Algeria	0	1	0	1
20	Cuba	0	1	0	1
20	Finland	0	1	0	1
20	Germany	0	1	0	1
20	Ukraine	0	1	0	1
25	Jamaica	0	0	3	3
26	Spain	0	0	2	2
27	Benin	0	0	1	1
27	Estonia	0	0	1	1
27	Kenya	0	0	1	1
27	Portugal	0	0	1	1
27	Slovenia	0	0	1	1
27	South Korea	0	0	1	1
Totals (32 entries)		26	26	26	78

== Placing table ==
United States won the placing table.

Rank	Country	1st place, gold medalist(s)	2nd place, silver medalist(s)	3rd place, bronze medalist(s)	4	5	6	7	8	Medals	Points
1	United States	6	9	5	3	6	3	3	0	20	195
2	Great Britain	2	1	1	2	1	2	1	0	4	51
3	Italy	0	2	2	3	1	0	2	1	4	50
4	Ethiopia	2	1	1	1	2	1	2	0	4	49
5	Belgium	3	0	1	1	0	2	1	2	4	45
6	New Zealand	2	2	0	2	1	0	0	0	4	44
7	Netherlands	2	1	2	0	1	0	1	1	5	42
8	Spain	0	0	2	1	1	2	0	0	2	27
9	Jamaica	0	0	3	0	0	2	1	0	3	26
10	France	0	1	1	0	1	1	1	2	2	24

== Medal summary ==
=== Men ===
Event	Gold		Silver		Bronze	
60 metres	Christian Coleman; United States	6.41 WL	Noah Lyles; United States	6.44	Ackeem Blake; Jamaica	6.46
400 metres	Alexander Doom; Belgium	45.25 NR	Karsten Warholm; Norway	45.34	Rusheen McDonald; Jamaica	45.65 PB
800 metres	Bryce Hoppel; United States	1:44.92 WL	Andreas Kramer; Sweden	1:45.27 SB	Eliott Crestan; Belgium	1:45.32
1500 metres	Geordie Beamish; New Zealand	3:36.54 PB	Cole Hocker; United States	3:36.69 PB	Hobbs Kessler; United States	3:36.72
3000 metres	Josh Kerr; Great Britain	7:42.98	Yared Nuguse; United States	7:43.59	Selemon Barega; Ethiopia	7:43.64
60 metres hurdles	Grant Holloway; United States	7.29 =CR	Lorenzo Simonelli; Italy	7.43 NR	Just Kwaou-Mathey; France	7.47
4 × 400 metres relay	Belgium; Jonathan Sacoor; Dylan Borlée; Christian Iguacel; Alexander Doom; Tibo De Smet*	3:02.54 WL	United States; Jacory Patterson; Matthew Boling; Noah Lyles; Christopher Bailey; Paul Dedewo*; Trevor Bassitt*	3:02.60 SB	Netherlands; Liemarvin Bonevacia; Ramsey Angela; Terrence Agard; Tony van Diepen; Taymir Burnet*; Isaya Klein Ikkink*	3:04.25 NR
High jump	Hamish Kerr; New Zealand	2.36 m AR, WL	Shelby McEwen; United States	2.28 m	Woo Sang-hyeok; South Korea	2.28 m
Pole vault	Armand Duplantis; Sweden	6.05 m	Sam Kendricks; United States	5.90 m	Emmanouil Karalis; Greece	5.85 m
Long jump	Miltiadis Tentoglou; Greece	8.22 m	Mattia Furlani; Italy	8.22 m	Carey McLeod; Jamaica	8.21 m
Triple jump	Hugues Fabrice Zango; Burkina Faso	17.53 m	Yasser Triki; Algeria	17.35 m	Tiago Pereira; Portugal	17.08 m
Shot put	Ryan Crouser; United States	22.77 m CR	Tom Walsh; New Zealand	22.07 m	Leonardo Fabbri; Italy	21.96 m
Heptathlon	Simon Ehammer; Switzerland	6418 pts NR, WL	Sander Skotheim; Norway	6407 pts NR	Johannes Erm; Estonia	6340 pts PB
WR world record | AR area record | CR championship record | GR games record | NR national record | OR Olympic record | PB personal best | SB season best | WL world leading (in a given season)

* Indicates the athletes only competed in the preliminary heats and received medals

=== Women ===
Event	Gold		Silver		Bronze	
60 metres	Julien Alfred; Saint Lucia	6.98 =WL	Ewa Swoboda; Poland	7.00	Zaynab Dosso; Italy	7.05
400 metres	Femke Bol; Netherlands	49.17 WR	Lieke Klaver; Netherlands	50.16	Alexis Holmes; United States	50.24 PB
800 metres	Tsige Duguma; Ethiopia	2:01.90	Jemma Reekie; Great Britain	2:02.72	Noélie Yarigo; Benin	2:03.15
1500 metres	Freweyni Hailu; Ethiopia	4:01.46	Nikki Hiltz; United States	4:02.32	Emily Mackay; United States	4:02.69
3000 metres	Elle St. Pierre; United States	8:20.87 CR, AR	Gudaf Tsegay; Ethiopia	8:21.13	Beatrice Chepkoech; Kenya	8:22.68 NR
60 metres hurdles	Devynne Charlton; Bahamas	7.65 WR	Cyrena Samba-Mayela; France	7.74	Pia Skrzyszowska; Poland	7.79
4 × 400 metres relay	Netherlands; Lieke Klaver; Cathelijn Peeters; Lisanne de Witte; Femke Bol; Myrte van der Schoot*; Eveline Saalberg*	3:25.07 NR, WL	United States; Quanera Hayes; Talitha Diggs; Bailey Lear; Alexis Holmes; Jessica Wright*; Na'Asha Robinson*	3:25.34 SB	Great Britain; Laviai Nielsen; Lina Nielsen; Ama Pipi; Jessie Knight; Hannah Kelly*	3:26.36 NR
High jump	Nicola Olyslagers; Australia	1.99 m	Yaroslava Mahuchikh; Ukraine	1.97 m	Lia Apostolovski; Slovenia	1.95 m PB
Pole vault	Molly Caudery; Great Britain	4.80 m	Eliza McCartney; New Zealand	4.80 m	Katie Moon; United States	4.75 m
Long jump	Tara Davis-Woodhall; United States	7.07 m	Monae' Nichols; United States	6.85 m SB	Fátima Diame; Spain	6.78 m SB
Triple jump	Thea Lafond; Dominica	15.01 m NR, WL	Leyanis Pérez; Cuba	14.90 m SB	Ana Peleteiro; Spain	14.75 m NR
Shot put	Sarah Mitton; Canada	20.22 m SB	Yemisi Ogunleye; Germany	20.19 m PB	Chase Jackson; United States	19.67 m
Pentathlon	Noor Vidts; Belgium	4773 pts WL	Saga Vanninen; Finland	4677 pts NR	Sofie Dokter; Netherlands	4571 pts SB
WR world record | AR area record | CR championship record | GR games record | NR national record | OR Olympic record | PB personal best | SB season best | WL world leading (in a given season)

* Indicates the athletes only competed in the preliminary heats and received medals

== Qualification criteria ==
In individual events except Combined Events athletes could qualify by achieving the Entry Standard within the qualification period or by World Indoor Tour Wildcard (2023 or 2024) or by virtue of their position in the World Rankings as of 18 February 2024. The qualification period runs from 1 January 2023 to 18 February 2024. Each Member Federation will be allowed to participate with a maximum of two qualified athletes (three in case of a Wild Card) in each event. Countries who have no male and/or no female qualified athletes (eligible by Entry Standard) in any event may enter one unqualified male athlete or one unqualified female athlete in a running event (except the 800 m). If the host nation does not have a qualified athlete in an event, it may enter one athlete in this event regardless of any Entry Standard (except for the Combined Events). In Combined Events 12 athletes will be invited in the men's heptathlon and women's pentathlon as follows: the winner of the 2023 World Combined Events Tour, the five best athletes from the 2023 Outdoor Lists (maximum one per country), the five best athletes from the 2024 Indoor Lists (as of 11 February 2024) and one athlete at the discretion of World Athletics. In Relays there is no entry standard and each Member Federation will be able to enter one team of up to eight athletes in each event.

All athletes born before and including 2008 (aged at least 16 years on 31 December 2024) are eligible to compete, except for the men's shot put where the limit is 2006 (athletes aged at least 18 years on 31 December 2024).

Entry Standards and target numbers of athletes / teams per event
Event	Women		Men		Quota
Event	Indoor	Outdoor	Indoor	Outdoor	Quota
60 metres	7.19	11.05 for 100 m	6.58	10.00 for 100 m	56
400 metres	51.60	50.50	45.90	44.80	30
800 metres	2:00.80	1:58.00	1:46.00	1:44.00	30
1500 metres (Mile)	4:06.50 (4:26.00)	4:00.00 (4:18.00)	3:36.00 (3:53.50)	3:32.00 (3:48.80)	30
3000 metres (5000 metres)	8:37.00	8:27.00 (14:32.00)	7:34.00	7:29.00 (12:50.00)	15
60 m hurdles	8.02	12.80 for 100 mH	7.62	13.28 for 110 mH	48
High jump	1.98 m (6 ft 5 3/4 in)		2.34 m (7 ft 8 in)		12
Pole vault	4.80 m (15 ft 8 3/4 in)		5.90 m (19 ft 4 1/4 in)		12
Long jump	6.89 m (22 ft 7 1/4 in)		8.28 m (27 ft 1 3/4 in)		16
Triple jump	14.62 m (47 ft 11 1/2 in)		17.25 m (56 ft 7 in)		16
Shot put	19.30 m (63 ft 3 3/4 in)		21.70 m (71 ft 2 1/4 in)		16
Combined events	see above				12
Relays	see above				

== Participating nations ==
In brackets the number of athletes participating.

- Afghanistan (1)
- Albania (1)
- Algeria (3)
- American Samoa (1)
- Andorra (1)
- Argentina (1)
- Armenia (1)
- Australia (6)
- Austria (5)
- Bahamas (6)
- Bangladesh (1)
- Barbados (2)
- Belgium (23)
- Benin (1)
- Bolivia (1)
- Bosnia and Herzegovina (1)
- Botswana (1)
- Brazil (20)
- British Virgin Islands (2)
- Bulgaria (1)
- Burkina Faso (1)
- Cameroon (1)
- Canada (13)
- Cayman Islands (1)
- Chile (3)
- China (7)
- Colombia (2)
- Comoros (1)
- Cook Islands (1)
- Croatia (3)
- Cuba (3)
- Cyprus (2)
- Czech Republic (21)
- Denmark (5)
- Djibouti (1)
- Dominica (1)
- Ecuador (1)
- Egypt (1)
- Estonia (3)
- Eswatini (1)
- Ethiopia (13)
- Federated States of Micronesia (1)
- Fiji (1)
- Finland (8)
- France (13)
- Gambia (1)
- Germany (7)
- Gibraltar (1)
- Great Britain (23) (hosts)
- Greece (9)
- Guam (1)
- Haiti (1)
- Hungary (10)
- Iceland (1)
- India (2)
- Iran (1)
- Iraq (1)
- Ireland (9)
- Italy (21)
- Jamaica (20)
- Japan (7)
- Jordan (1)
- Kazakhstan (2)
- Kenya (12)
- Kyrgyzstan (1)
- Latvia (2)
- Lebanon (1)
- Liberia (1)
- Lithuania (2)
- Luxembourg (4)
- Macau (1)
- Maldives (1)
- Mali (1)
- Malta (1)
- Marshall Islands (1)
- Mauritius (1)
- Mexico (3)
- Moldova (1)
- Monaco (1)
- Montenegro (1)
- Montserrat (1)
- Morocco (2)
- Mozambique (1)
- Nauru (1)
- Netherlands (22)
- New Zealand (10)
- Nigeria (3)
- North Macedonia (1)
- Northern Mariana Islands (1)
- Norway (6)
- Oman (1)
- Pakistan (1)
- Palau (1)
- Papua New Guinea (1)
- Paraguay (1)
- Philippines (3)
- Poland (22)
- Portugal (15)
- Puerto Rico (3)
- Romania (7)
- Rwanda (1)
- Saint Lucia (1)
- San Marino (1)
- Saudi Arabia (1)
- Serbia (4)
- Seychelles (1)
- Sierra Leone (1)
- Singapore (1)
- Slovakia (8)
- Slovenia (6)
- Solomon Islands (1)
- South Africa (3)
- South Korea (1)
- Spain (20)
- Sweden (9)
- Switzerland (11)
- Tanzania (1)
- Tonga (1)
- Trinidad and Tobago (2)
- Turkey (3)
- Turks and Caicos Islands (1)
- Tuvalu (1)
- Uganda (1)
- Ukraine (6)
- United States (54)
- United States Virgin Islands (1)
- Uruguay (2)
- Belarusian and Russian athletes are not allowed to compete at the event after a ban as a result of the Russian invasion of Ukraine.
