= Rusheen McDonald =

Jamaican sprinter (born 1992)

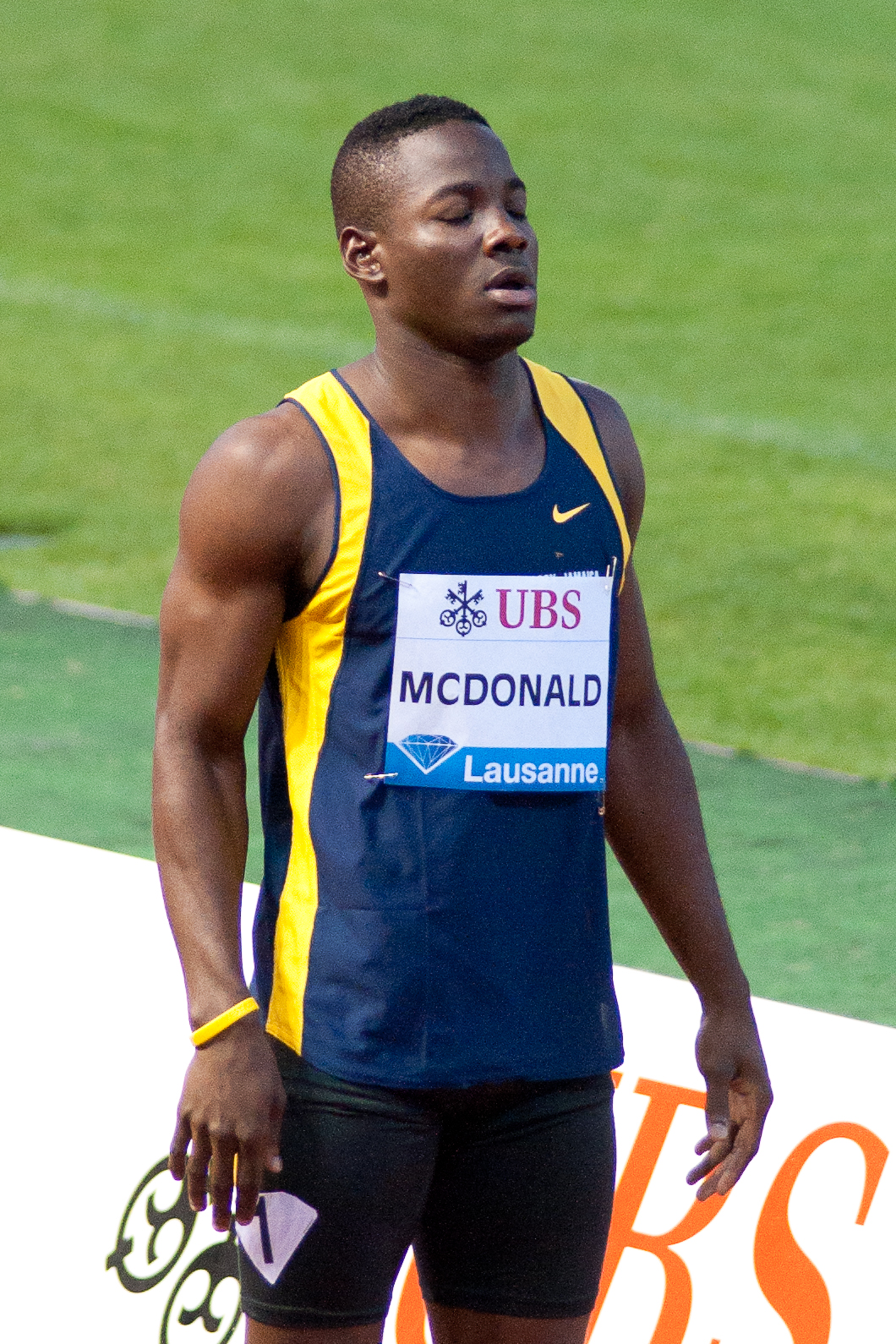
- Rusheen Mc Donald during 2012 Athletissima

Personal information
- Nationality: Jamaican
- Born: 17 August 1992 (age 34)
- Height: 5 ft 7 in (1.70 m)
- Weight: 170 lb (77 kg)

Sport
- Sport: Track and field
- Event: 400 metres
- Club: MVP Track Club
- Coached by: Stephen Francis

Achievements and titles
- Personal bests: 100 m: 10.53; 200 m: 20.57; 300m: 31.94; 400 m: 43.93 NR; Indoor 400m: 45.65
Medal record
Men's athletics
Representing Jamaica
Olympic Games
Silver medal – second place	2016 Rio de Janeiro	4×400 m relay
World Championships
Silver medal – second place	2013 Moscow	4×400 m relay
World Indoor Championships
Silver medal – second place	2025 Nanjing	4×400 m relay
Bronze medal – third place	2024 Glasgow	400 metres
NACAC Championships
Gold medal – first place	2025 Freeport	4 × 400 m relay
Silver medal – second place	2025 Freeport	400 m

Rusheen McDonald (born 17 August 1992) is a Jamaican sprinter who runs the 400 metres. He won a bronze medal in the 400 metres at the 2024 World Athletics Indoor Championships.

== Biography ==
McDonald is from Mandeville Manchester, Jamaica.

== Career ==
Athlete Stats:

2012

Competing at the 2012 Summer Olympics, Rusheen was in the 400 metres and 4 x 400 metres relay.

Rusheen qualified for the 2012 Summer Olympics, after placing second in the 400 metres at the Jamaican Olympic Trials, with a time of 45.1 seconds. In the 400 preliminaries at the Olympics, Rusheen placed fourth in his heat with a time of 46.67 seconds, failing to qualify for the semi-finals.

2013

He left the 2013 IAAF World Championships with a silver medal for the 4 x 400 metres in a 2.59:88 season best.

2015

In 2015, Rusheen qualified for the 15th World Championships in Athletics after placing second in the 400 metres at the Jamaican National Championships, with a time of 44.73 seconds. Two months after, in the 400 heats at the World Championships, Rusheen placed second with a time of 43.93 seconds breaking Jermaine Gonzales's Jamaican record. As of 2018, his time ranks him in the top 15 in history.

2016

At the Summer Olympics, he ran the heats and qualified Jamaica to the finals, where a stellar performance by the anchor Javon Francis earned the team a silver medal.

2023

At the 2023 World Athletics Championships in Budapest, Hungary, he and the Jamaican team finished fourth in 2.59:54 just off the podium.

2024

McDonald won a bronze medal in a 45.65 personal best at the 2024 World Athletics Indoor Championships in Glasgow, Scotland.

2025

At the 2025 World Athletics Indoor Championships, Rusheen claimed silver with the 4 x 400 metres relay squad in 3.05:05, the first medal in this event in a decade.

He got an individual silver medal in 45.04 and a relay gold in 3.02:86 at the 2025 NACAC Championships in Nassau, Bahamas.

For 2025, he won the 400m title at the Jamaican National Championships, then went on to place 4th (44.28) at the 2025 World Athletics Championships in Tokyo, Japan. He was in third down the straight, but was passed a little before the line by Bayapo Ndori (44.20) of Botswana and ended in fourth. A couple days later, he anchored the men's 4 × 400 m relay which placed 7th overall in a time of 3.03:46.
