= Elija Godwin =

American sprinter

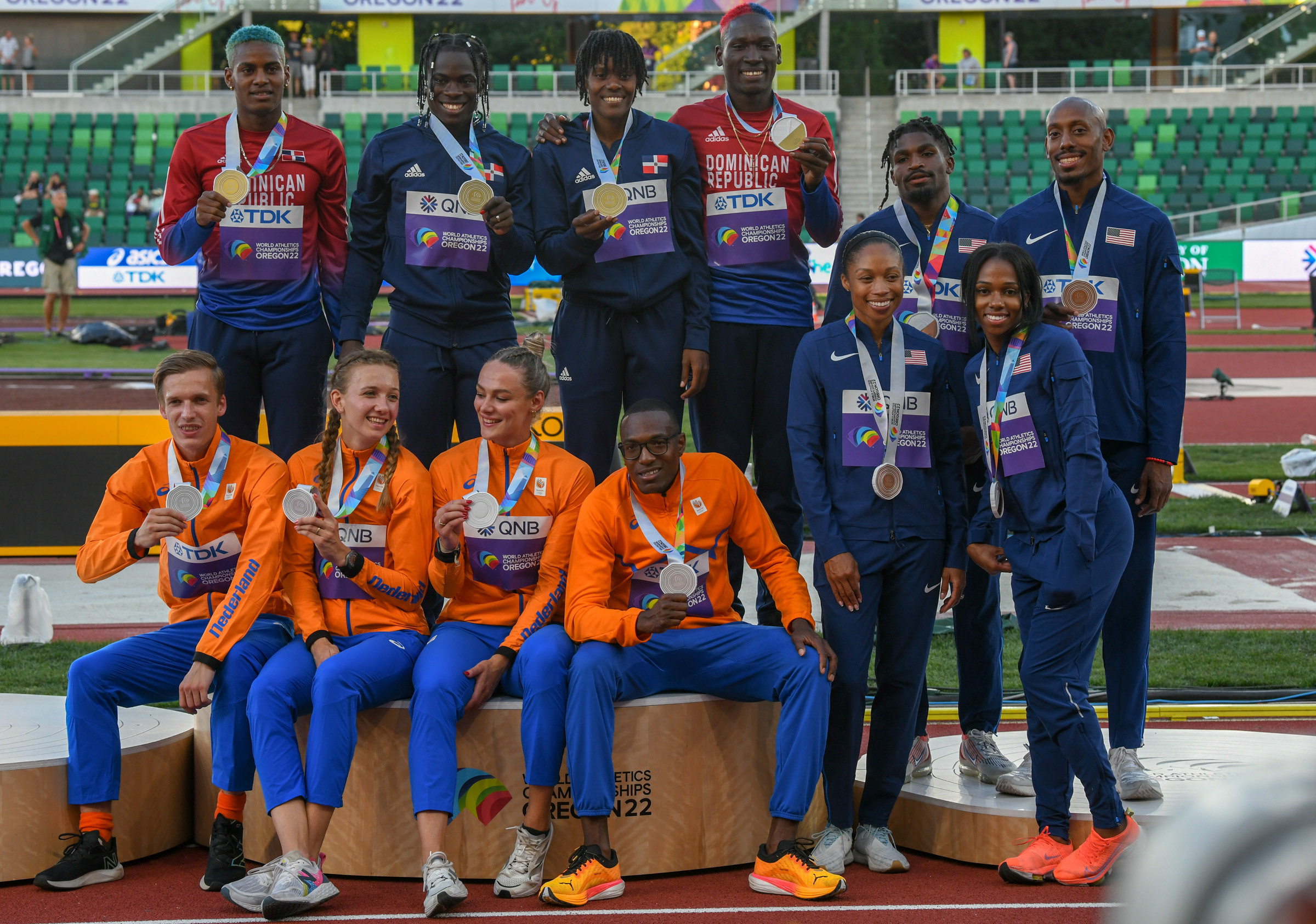
- Godwin at the 2022 World Athletics Championships

Personal information
- Born: July 1, 1999 (age 27) Covington, Georgia, U.S.

Sport
- Country: United States
- Sport: Track and field
- Events: 200 m, 400 m
- College team: Georgia Bulldogs

Achievements and titles
- Personal bests: 100 m: 10.47 (Atlanta 2019); 200 m: 20.32 (Athens, GA 2021); 400 m: 44.61 (College Station 2021)
Medal record
Men's athletics
Representing the United States
Olympic Games
Bronze medal – third place	2020 Tokyo	4 × 400 m mixed
World Championships
Gold medal – first place	2022 Eugene	4 × 400 m relay
Bronze medal – third place	2022 Eugene	4 × 400 m mixed
World Indoor Championships
Gold medal – first place	2025 Nanjing	4 × 400 m relay
Gold medal – first place	2026 Toruń	4 × 400 m relay

Elija Godwin (born July 1, 1999) is an American athlete who specializes in the 400 meters.

== Biography ==
=== Early career ===
Godwin is from Covington, Georgia and is a student at the University of Georgia. Initially, Godwin only ran on the track to condition himself for football. Then, once he began to train more seriously, he would run mostly 100 m and 200 m. This was until his coach, Kevin Barnes, looked at his split times and suggested he run an open 400 m race. Godwin ran 47.40 for the 400 m at his first race.

=== Javelin injury ===
On May 7, 2019, Godwin suffered a severe injury during a training session when he was impaled by a javelin while running backward sprints at Georgia track and field practice prior to the 2019 SEC Outdoor Track and Field Championships. The accident left Godwin with wounds to his back and shoulder and collapsed his left lung. Emergency services attended to him and ground off part of the javelin before he was taken to Piedmont Athens Regional Medical Centre, where the rest of it was removed by surgeons.

=== Senior career ===
On May 15, 2021, he ran a personal best 44.61 at the Cushing stadium in Texas at the SEC Outdoor Championships to meet the Olympic qualifying standard. At the NCAA Outdoor Championships, Hayward Field, Eugene, Oregon he finished fourth in his heat in a time of 46.18.

He qualified for the final of the USA men's Olympic Trials 400 m race, running 44.81 and 45.10 in the heats. In the final he placed sixth and qualified for US men's relay pool for the 4 × 400 m at the 2020 Summer Games. At the Olympics he won a Bronze medal as part of the American Mixed 4 × 400 metres relay team.

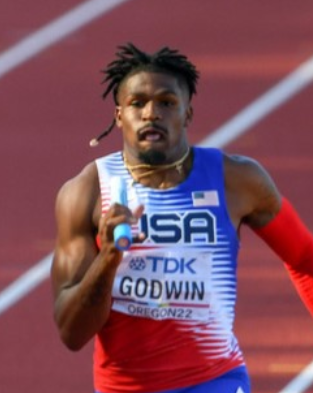
Godwin at the 2022 World Championships

Indoors, Godwin finished 7th in his heat of the 400 m at the SEC Championships and did not make the final, but returned to anchor the University of Georgia's 4 × 400 m team with a winning 44.95 leg. At the NCAA Indoor Championships, he finished 4th in his heat of the 400 m and anchored Georgia to 4th in the 4 × 400 m final. Outdoors, Godwin was the runner-up at the SEC Championship meet in 44.81, behind Champion Allison of Florida who ran 44.74. At the NCAA Championships in Eugene, Oregon, Godwin placed 3rd in a personal-best 44.50 behind Allison (44.41) and defending champion Randolph Ross (44.13) of North Carolina A&T. Competing for the United States at the 2022 World Athletics Championships in Eugene, Oregon Godwin won bronze in the mixed 4 × 400 m relay and then gold in the men's 4 × 400 m relay, completing the first leg in a team also consisting of Michael Norman, Bryce Deadmon and Champion Allison.

He won a gold medal in the men's 4 × 400 metres relay at the 2025 World Athletics Indoor Championships in Nanjing in March 2025. He competed at the 2025 World Athletics Relays in China in the Men's 4 × 400 metres relay in May 2025.

Godwin was finalist in the 400 metres at the 2026 USA Indoor Track and Field Championships in New York, running 47.47 seconds in the final. He was selected for the United States relay teams at the 2026 World Athletics Indoor Championships in Toruń, Poland, and ran in the men's 4 × 400 metres heats with the team later winning the gold medal.

== Personal life ==
His mother, Ginger Luby, was working her job as an administrator in a doctor's office when she received the call that Elija had been injured by the javelin in 2019. Godwin has one brother, Okon Godwin and a sister, Kyaundra Ward. He graduated from Newton High School in Covington, Georgia in 2018. Godwin received special recognition from Covington's city council by way of a proclamation that made 10 September 2022 "Elija Godwin" day.
