= Nanjing Youth Olympic Sports Park =

Sports facility in Nanjing, China

南京青奥体育公园 Nanjing Youth Olympic Sports Park
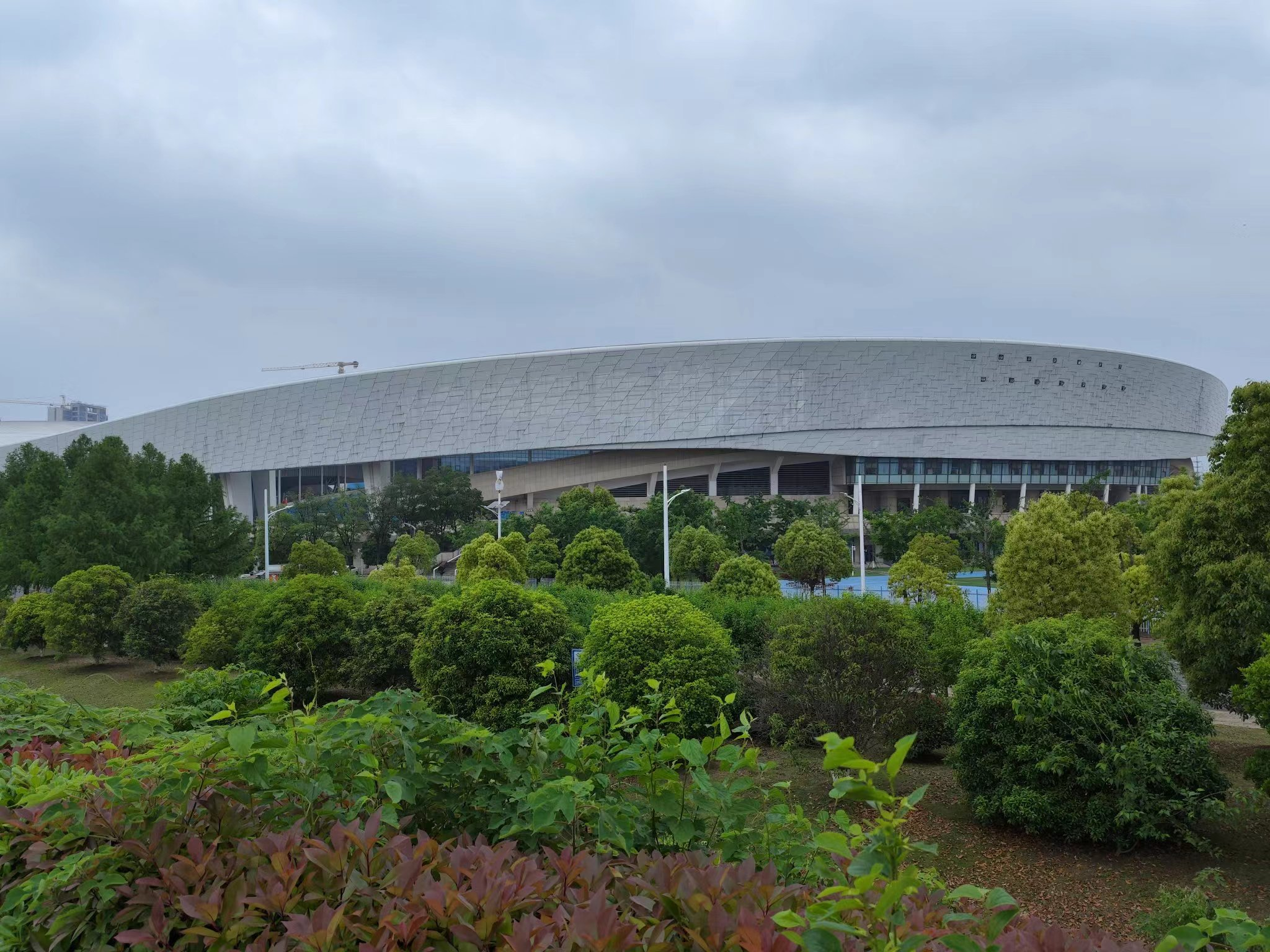
- Interactive map of 南京青奥体育公园; Nanjing Youth Olympic Sports Park
- Location: Qing'ao Blvd, Pukou District, Nanjing, China
- Coordinates: 32.0432°N 118.6624°E
- Owner: City of Nanjing
- Operator: Nanjing Sport Industry Group
- Capacity: 21,000 (indoor arena); 18,000 (stadium)

Construction
- Built: 27 December 2011

Tenant
- Nanjing Monkey Kings (basketball)

The Nanjing Youth Olympic Sports Park (Chinese: 南京青奥体育公园) is a sport complex located in Pukou District, Nanjing, China. Its construction was started in December 2011 as part of the venues used for 2014 Summer Youth Olympics. The complex, which occupies around 1,000,000 m^{2} of land, consists of a main arena with other smaller sport venues.

== Main arena ==
The main arena consists of two parts, the 21,000-seater Nanjing Youth Olympic Sports Park Arena and the 18,000-seater Nanjing Youth Olympic Sports Park Stadium. Unveiled in November 2017, the indoor arena is the largest indoor stadium in China. The indoor arena can host a wide range of sports such as basketball, badminton, ice hockey, and gymnastics competitions.

== Other facilities ==
During the 2014 Summer Youth Olympic Games, some permanent and temporary venues were built such as BMX Park, rugby sevens field, hockey field, modern pentathlon course, and beach volleyball arena. There is also the Nanjing Olympic Museum located in the park.

== Tournaments hosted ==
- 2016 World Roller Speed Skating Championships
- 2018 BWF World Championships
- 2019 FIBA Basketball World Cup

== See also ==
- List of indoor arenas in China
