= 2005 European Athletics Indoor Championships – Men's long jump =

The Men's long jump event at the 2005 European Athletics Indoor Championships was held on March 5–6.

== Medalists ==
Gold	Silver	Bronze
Joan Lino Martínez; Spain	Bogdan Țăruș; Romania	Vladimir Zyuskov; Ukraine

== Results ==
=== Qualification ===
Qualifying perf. 8.05 (Q) or 8 best performers (q) advanced to the Final.

Rank	Group	Athlete	Nationality	#1	#2	#3	Result	Note
1	B	Louis Tsatoumas	Greece	8.09			8.09	Q
2	B	Joan Lino Martínez	Spain	7.94	8.01	–	8.01	q
3	B	Vladimir Zyuskov	Ukraine	7.86	7.99	7.82	7.99	q
4	B	Bogdan Țăruș	Romania	7.78	7.97	X	7.97	q
5	A	Nils Winter	Germany	7.67	7.71	7.96	7.96	q
6	B	Tommi Evilä	Finland	X	7.89	7.93	7.93	q
7	B	Gaspar Araujo	Portugal	7.66	7.77	7.88	7.88	q
8	A	Ivan Pucelj	Croatia	7.75	7.88	X	7.88	q
9	B	Chris Tomlinson	Great Britain	7.85	X	7.78	7.85	
10	A	Salim Sdiri	France	7.56	7.69	7.85	7.85	
11	B	Yann Domenech	France	7.78	7.83	7.80	7.83	
12	A	Vitaliy Shkurlatov	Russia	7.43	7.73	7.83	7.83	
13	A	Povilas Mykolaitis	Lithuania	7.57	7.82	7.73	7.82	
14	B	Olexiy Lukashevych	Ukraine	7.73	7.81	7.69	7.81	
15	A	Stergios Nousios	Greece	7.73	7.79	X	7.79	
16	B	Marcin Starzak	Poland	7.52	X	7.74	7.74	
17	B	Jan Žumer	Slovenia	7.60	7.70	X	7.70	
18	A	Tomasz Mateusiak	Poland	7.68	X	X	7.68	
18	A	Nathan Morgan	Great Britain	7.68	–	–	7.68	
20	A	Valeriy Vasylyev	Ukraine	7.32	7.67	X	7.67	
21	A	Danut Simion	Romania	7.56	X	7.57	7.57	
22	A	Isagani Peychär	Austria	7.39	7.35	7.52	7.52	
23	A	Morten Jensen	Denmark	X	7.51	X	7.51	
24	A	Alberto Sanz	Spain	7.49	7.37	X	7.49	
25	A	Bogdan Tudor	Romania	X	X	7.47	7.47	
26	B	Štepán Wagner	Czech Republic	X	X	7.44	7.44	
27	B	Marko Milinkov	Serbia and Montenegro	7.34	7.12	7.36	7.36	
28	B	Dmitriy Sapinskiy	Russia	7.20	7.36	X	7.36	
29	A	Rachid Chouhal	Malta	X	X	6.80	6.80	

=== Final ===
Rank	Athlete	Nationality	#1	#2	#3	#4	#5	#6	Result	Note
1st place, gold medalist(s)	Joan Lino Martínez	Spain	X	8.04	7.95	8.37	–	X	8.37	WL
2nd place, silver medalist(s)	Bogdan Țăruș	Romania	8.04	8.14	X	7.98	8.10	X	8.14	SB
3rd place, bronze medalist(s)	Vladimir Zyuskov	Ukraine	7.95	7.96	7.99	X	X	7.86	7.99	
4	Tommi Evilä	Finland	X	X	7.85	X	7.97	X	7.97	
5	Gaspar Araujo	Portugal	7.61	7.55	X	7.87	7.84	7.81	7.87	
6	Ivan Pucelj	Croatia	X	X	X	X	7.79	7.84	7.84	
7	Nils Winter	Germany	7.57	7.74	7.78	7.78	7.80	7.80	7.80	
	Louis Tsatoumas	Greece	X	X	X	X	X	X	NM	
