= 2001 European Athletics U23 Championships – Men's long jump =

The men's long jump event at the 2001 European Athletics U23 Championships was held in Amsterdam, Netherlands, at Olympisch Stadion on 13 and 15 July.

== Medalists ==
Gold	Yann Doménech; France
Silver	Volodymyr Zyuskov; Ukraine
Bronze	Schahriar Bigdeli; Germany

== Results ==
=== Final ===
15 July

Rank	Name	Nationality	Attempts						Result	Notes
Rank	Name	Nationality	1	2	3	4	5	6	Result	Notes
1st place, gold medalist(s)	Yann Doménech	France	6.73 (w: -1.2 m/s)	7.58 (w: -0.9 m/s)	7.69 (w: -1.0 m/s)	–	7.44 (w: 0.2 m/s)	8.00 (w: 0.1 m/s)	8.00 (w: 0.1 m/s)	
2nd place, silver medalist(s)	Volodymyr Zyuskov	Ukraine	x	7.71 (w: -0.2 m/s)	7.90 (w: -0.2 m/s)	7.74 (w: -0.1 m/s)	7.90 (w: 1.0 m/s)	x	7.90 (w: -0.2 m/s)	
3rd place, bronze medalist(s)	Schahriar Bigdeli	Germany	7.67 (w: -0.2 m/s)	x	x	7.81 (w: 0.8 m/s)	7.77 (w: -0.5 m/s)	7.62 (w: 0.8 m/s)	7.81 (w: 0.8 m/s)	
4	Leslie Djhone	France	7.72 (w: 0.2 m/s)	7.59 (w: 0.5 m/s)	7.80 (w: 0.2 m/s)	7.55 (w: -0.7 m/s)	x	x	7.80 (w: 0.2 m/s)	
5	Tommi Evilä	Finland	7.57 (w: 0.5 m/s)	7.59 (w: -0.1 m/s)	x	x	7.67 (w: -0.7 m/s)	7.77 (w: 0.6 m/s)	7.77 (w: 0.6 m/s)	
6	Chris Tomlinson	United Kingdom	7.59 (w: 0 m/s)	7.43 (w: -0.9 m/s)	7.70 (w: -0.2 m/s)	7.07 (w: 0.3 m/s)	7.43 (w: 1.1 m/s)	7.12 (w: 0.7 m/s)	7.70 (w: -0.2 m/s)	
7	Asterios Nousios	Greece	x	7.47 (w: -0.6 m/s)	7.59 (w: -0.4 m/s)	x	x	7.68 (w: 0.5 m/s)	7.68 (w: 0.5 m/s)	
8	Luka Aračić	Croatia	7.52 (w: 0 m/s)	7.44 (w: 1.3 m/s)	x	7.21 (w: -0.8 m/s)	7.50 (w: 0.3 m/s)	7.67 (w: -0.9 m/s)	7.67 (w: -0.9 m/s)	
9	Danial Jahić	Yugoslavia	x	7.52 (w: -0.1 m/s)	7.26 (w: -0.7 m/s)				7.52 (w: -0.1 m/s)	
10	Ivan Pucelj	Croatia	7.51 (w: -0.6 m/s)	7.42 (w: -0.6 m/s)	7.42 (w: -0.3 m/s)				7.51 (w: -0.6 m/s)	
11	Nouzalter Abreu	Portugal	7.26 (w: 0.9 m/s)	7.06 (w: 1.8 m/s)	7.39 (w: -0.6 m/s)				7.39 (w: -0.6 m/s)	
12	Boštjan Fridrih	Slovenia	x	7.38 (w: -0.9 m/s)	x				7.38 (w: -0.9 m/s)	

=== Qualifications ===
13 July
Qualifying 7.85 or 12 best to the Final

==== Group A ====
Rank	Name	Nationality	Result	Notes
1	Volodymyr Zyuskov	Ukraine	7.83 (w: 1.1 m/s)	q
2	Leslie Djhone	France	7.76 (w: 0.0 m/s)	q
3	Chris Tomlinson	United Kingdom	7.73 (w: 0.5 m/s)	q
4	Danial Jahić	Yugoslavia	7.71 (w: 0.9 m/s)	q
5	Asterios Nousios	Greece	7.55 (w: 0.4 m/s)	q
6	Ivan Pucelj	Croatia	7.53 (w: 1.1 m/s)	q
7	Stefano Dacastello	Italy	7.51 (w: 0.8 m/s)	
8	Steffen Landgraf	Germany	7.43 (w: 0.9 m/s)	
9	Isagani Peychär	Austria	7.26 (w: 0.7 m/s)	
10	Ilja Tumorin	Estonia	7.11 (w: 0.4 m/s)	
11	Andrei Hodos	Romania	6.84 (w: 0.2 m/s)	

==== Group B ====
Rank	Name	Nationality	Result	Notes
1	Schahriar Bigdeli	Germany	7.62 (w: -0.8 m/s)	q
2	Tommi Evilä	Finland	7.61 (w: -0.1 m/s)	q
3	Luka Aračić	Croatia	7.55 (w: -0.1 m/s)	q
4	Boštjan Fridrih	Slovenia	7.54 (w: -0.6 m/s)	q
5	Yann Doménech	France	7.54 (w: -0.1 m/s)	q
6	Nouzalter Abreu	Portugal	7.53 (w: 0.1 m/s)	q
7	Andreas Pohle	Germany	7.36 (w: -0.3 m/s)	
8	Pál Babicz	Hungary	7.17 (w: 0.3 m/s)	
9	Sergiy Seliverstov	Ukraine	7.04 (w: -0.2 m/s)	
10	Josep Maria Gener	Spain	NM	

== Participation ==
According to an unofficial count, 21 athletes from 16 countries participated in the event.

- Austria (1)
- Croatia (2)
- Estonia (1)
- Finland (1)
- France (2)
- Germany (3)
- Greece (1)
- Hungary (1)
- Italy (1)
- Portugal (1)
- Romania (1)
- Slovenia (1)
- Spain (1)
- Ukraine (2)
- United Kingdom (1)
- Yugoslavia (1)
