= Athletics at the 2005 Summer Universiade – Men's long jump =

The men's long jump event at the 2005 Summer Universiade was held on 17–18 August in İzmir, Turkey.

== Medalists ==
Gold	Silver	Bronze
Volodymyr Zyuskov; Ukraine	Issam Nima; Algeria	Stefano Dacastello; Italy

== Results ==
=== Qualification ===
Rank	Group	Athlete	Nationality	Result	Notes
1	B	Issam Nima	Algeria	7.72	q
2	A	Kafétien Gomis	France	7.66	q
2	A	Yaw Fosu-Amoah	South Africa	7.66	q
2	B	Thierry Adanabou	Burkina Faso	7.66	q
5	A	Ivan Pucelj	Croatia	7.63	q
6	B	Volodymyr Zyuskov	Ukraine	7.61	q
7	B	Boštjan Fridrih	Slovenia	7.55	q
8	B	Gaspar Araújo	Portugal	7.54w	q
9	B	Peter Rapp	Germany	7.53	q
10	A	Stefano Dacastello	Italy	7.52	q
11	A	Štepán Wagner	Czech Republic	7.51	q
11	B	Dmitriy Sapinskiy	Russia	7.51	q
13	B	Marian Oprea	Romania	7.47w	
14	A	Jan Žumer	Slovenia	7.45	
15	B	Hideaki Shikama	Japan	7.43	
16	A	Nils Winter	Germany	7.41	
17	B	Dănuț Simion	Romania	7.40	
18	B	Marijo Baković	Croatia	7.37	
19	B	Isagani Peychär	Austria	7.35	
20	A	Alberto Sanz	Spain	7.28	
21	B	Kittisak Sukon	Thailand	7.27	
22	A	Leong Kin Kuan	Macau	7.22	NR
23	B	Ferhat Çiçek	Turkey	7.20	
24	A	Arsen Sargsyan	Armenia	7.18	
25	A	Therayut Philakong	Thailand	7.12	
26	A	Stanislav Kostadinov	Bulgaria	7.09	
27	A	Pál Babicz	Hungary	7.08	
28	?	Linkela Jasson	Namibia	6.45	
29	?	Lam Chang Fu	Macau	6.43	
30	?	Haykal Moussallem	Lebanon	6.41	
31	A	Henry Linton	Costa Rica	6.37	
32	?	Isaac Nabaasa	Uganda	6.05	
	A	Marc Habib	Lebanon	NM	

=== Final ===
Rank	Athlete	Nationality	#1	#2	#3	#4	#5	#6	Result	Notes
1st place, gold medalist(s)	Volodymyr Zyuskov	Ukraine	7.89	7.73	7.75	8.06	x	7.76	8.06	
2nd place, silver medalist(s)	Issam Nima	Algeria	x	7.89	7.90	8.02	–	8.00	8.02	
3rd place, bronze medalist(s)	Stefano Dacastello	Italy	7.95	x	7.35	7.37	7.52	x	7.95	SB
4	Ivan Pucelj	Croatia	7.72	x	7.79	x	x	x	7.79	
5	Gaspar Araújo	Portugal	7.61	x	x	7.21	x	7.04	7.61	
6	Boštjan Fridrih	Slovenia	x	7.46	4.26	x	x	7.48	7.48	
7	Kafétien Gomis	France	7.47	x	x	7.47	x	x	7.47	
8	Štepán Wagner	Czech Republic	x	7.45	7.38	7.14	7.32	7.11	7.45	
9	Dmitriy Sapinskiy	Russia	7.34	x	x				7.34	
10	Thierry Adanabou	Burkina Faso	x	x	7.27				7.27	
11	Yaw Fosu-Amoah	South Africa	x	x	7.10				7.10	
12	Peter Rapp	Germany	5.34	x	x				5.34	
