= 2005 World Championships in Athletics – Men's long jump =

The Men's Long Jump event at the 2005 World Championships in Athletics was held at the Helsinki Olympic Stadium on August 12 and August 13.

== Medalists ==
Gold	Dwight Phillips; United States (USA)
Silver	Ignisious Gaisah; Ghana (GHA)
Bronze	Tommi Evilä; Finland (FIN)

== Qualification ==
=== Heat 1 ===
1. Godfrey Khotso Mokoena, South Africa 8.22m Q
2. Salim Sdiri, France 8.18m Q
3. Vitaliy Shkurlatov, Russia 7.95m q
4. Christopher Tomlinson, Great Britain 7.83m
5. Ibrahim Camejo, Cuba 7.78m
6. Miguel Pate, United States 7.70m
7. Jonathan Chimier, Mauritius 7.65m
8. Povilas Mykolaitis, Lithuania 7.64m
9. Walter Davis, United States 7.42m
10. Yahya Berrabah, Morocco 7.33m
- Morten Jensen, Denmark NM
- Leevan Sands, Bahamas NM
- Jadel Gregório, Brazil DNS

=== Heat 2 ===
1. Dwight Phillips, United States 8.59m Q
2. Tommi Evilä, Finland 8.18m Q (NR)
3. James Beckford, Jamaica 8.13m Q
4. Issam Nima, Algeria 8.13m Q (NR)
5. Ignisious Gaisah, Ghana 8.11m Q
6. Joan Lino Martínez, Spain 8.10m Q
7. Irving Saladino, Panama 7.98m q
8. Volodymyr Zyuskov, Ukraine 7.97m q
9. Nils Winter, Germany 7.91m q
10. Brian Johnson, United States 7.91m
11. Shinichi Terano, Japan 7.27m
12. Eroni Tuivanuavou, Fiji 7.17m (SB)
- Iván Pedroso, Cuba NM
- Bogdan Tarus, Romania NM

== Final ==
Rank	Athlete	Attempts						Distance	Note
Rank	Athlete	1	2	3	4	5	6	Distance	Note
1st place, gold medalist(s)	Dwight Phillips (USA)	8.60	X	X	X	X	X	8.60 m	SB
2nd place, silver medalist(s)	Ignisious Gaisah (GHA)	7.76	8.11	8.34	8.17	8.05	—	8.34 m	NR
3rd place, bronze medalist(s)	Tommi Evilä (FIN)	X	X	8.16	8.12	8.25	X	8.25 m	
4	Joan Lino Martínez (ESP)	7.85	8.13	8.04	8.24	X	7.98	8.24 m	
5	Salim Sdiri (FRA)	8.20	8.07	7.96	7.97	X	8.21	8.21 m	
6	Irving Saladino (PAN)	8.00	7.91	8.06	8.00	8.20	8.12	8.20 m	
7	Godfrey Khotso Mokoena (RSA)	8.01	8.06	8.11	8.06	6.79	X	8.11 m	
8	Volodymyr Zyuskov (UKR)	7.56	8.06	X	8.01	X	X	8.06 m	
9	James Beckford (JAM)	X	8.02	7.93				8.02 m	
10	Vitaliy Shkurlatov (RUS)	X	7.88	7.66				7.88 m	
11	Issam Nima (ALG)	7.61	7.73	7.42				7.73 m	
12	Nils Winter (GER)	X	X	7.72				7.72 m	
