= 2003 World Championships in Athletics – Men's long jump =

These are the official results of the Men's Long Jump event at the 2003 World Championships in Paris, France. There were a total number of 36 participating athletes, with the final held on Friday 29 August 2003. The qualification standard was set at 8.15 metres (or at least the best twelve qualified).

== Medalists ==
Gold	Dwight Phillips; United States (USA)
Silver	James Beckford; Jamaica (JAM)
Bronze	Yago Lamela; Spain (ESP)

== Schedule ==
- All times are Central European Time (UTC+1)

Qualification Round
Group A	Group B
27.08.2003 – 18:25h	27.08.2003 – 18:25h
Final Round
29.08.2003 – 20:00h

== Abbreviations ==
- All results shown are in metres

Q	automatic qualification
q	qualification by rank
DNS	did not start
NM	no mark
WR	world record
AR	area record
NR	national record
PB	personal best
SB	season best

== Qualification ==
RANK	FINAL	GROUP A
1.	Yago Lamela (ESP)	8.19 m
2.	Dwight Phillips (USA)	8.12 m
3.	Ignisious Gaisah (GHA)	8.01 m
4.	Bogdan Tarus (ROU)	7.98 m
5.	Luis Felipe Méliz (CUB)	7.97 m
6.	Osbourne Moxey (BAH)	7.97 m
7.	Hussein Al-Sabee (KSA)	7.97 m
8.	Salim Sdiri (FRA)	7.94 m
9.	Siniša Ergotic (CRO)	7.87 m
10.	Kareem Streete-Thompson (CAY)	7.87 m
11.	Olexiy Lukashevych (UKR)	7.85 m
12.	Nathan Morgan (GBR)	7.83 m
13.	Nikolay Atanasov (BUL)	7.79 m
14.	Dimitrios Filindras (GRE)	7.72 m
15.	Gable Garenamotse (BOT)	7.57 m
16.	Danil Burkenya (RUS)	7.52 m
17.	Harmon Harmon (COK)	6.40 m
—	Hatem Mohamed Mersal (EGY)	DNS

RANK	FINAL	GROUP B
1.	Christopher Tomlinson (GBR)	8.16 m
2.	Walter Davis (USA)	8.14 m
3.	James Beckford (JAM)	8.01 m
4.	Volodymyr Zyuskov (UKR)	8.01 m
5.	Louis Tsatoumas (GRE)	8.00 m
6.	Nicola Trentin (ITA)	7.85 m
7.	Vitaliy Shkurlatov (RUS)	7.85 m
8.	Savante Stringfellow (USA)	7.83 m
9.	Nils Winter (GER)	7.80 m
10.	Dimitrios Serelis (GRE)	7.75 m
11.	Víctor Castillo (VEN)	7.71 m
12.	Abdulrahman Faraj Al-Nubi (QAT)	7.70 m
13.	Petar Dachev (BUL)	7.69 m
14.	Yahya Berrabah (MAR)	7.62 m
15.	Lao Jianfeng (CHN)	7.43 m
16.	Julien Fivaz (SUI)	7.37 m
—	Jonathan Chimier (MRI)	NM
—	Iván Pedroso (CUB)	NM

== Final ==
Rank	Athlete	Attempts						Distance	Note
Rank	Athlete	1	2	3	4	5	6	Distance	Note
1st place, gold medalist(s)	Dwight Phillips (USA)	8.09	X	8.22	X	8.32	X	8.32 m	
2nd place, silver medalist(s)	James Beckford (JAM)	X	7.99	8.16	8.12	8.28	8.14	8.28 m	
3rd place, bronze medalist(s)	Yago Lamela (ESP)	8.04	X	8.12	8.16	8.22	X	8.22 m	
4	Ignisious Gaisah (GHA)	8.03	8.13	7.90	8.11	7.95	7.88	8.13 m	
5	Hussein Al-Sabee (KSA)	X	7.71	8.09	7.79	8.10	7.70	8.10 m	
6	Volodymyr Zyuskov (UKR)	8.08	7.91	7.76	7.99	8.07	7.39	8.08 m	
7	Walter Davis (USA)	7.96	X	7.90	7.89	7.94	8.02	8.02 m	
8	Osbourne Moxey (BAH)	7.87	7.93	7.89	7.81	7.93	X	7.93 m	
9	Chris Tomlinson (GBR)	X	X	7.93				7.93 m	
10	Bogdan Tarus (ROM)	7.84	X	X				7.84 m	
11	Luis Méliz (CUB)	X	7.51	7.73				7.73 m	
12	Louis Tsatoumas (GRE)	X	X	7.72				7.72 m	

== See also ==
- Athletics at the 2003 Pan American Games – Men's long jump
