= Ivan Pucelj =

Croatian long jumper (born 1981)

Ivan Pucelj (born 11 July 1981) is a Croatian retired long jumper. His personal best jump was 7.92 metres, achieved in July 2003 in Ljubljana.

He was born in Zagreb. He finished tenth at the 2002 European Indoor Championships, eighth at the 2003 Summer Universiade, sixth at the 2005 European Indoor Championships and fourth at the 2005 Summer Universiade.

Pucelj became Croatian long jump champion in 2002, 2005 and 2006, rivalling with Marijo Baković.

He also became indoor champion in 2005 and 2006.

== Competition record ==
Year	Competition	Venue	Position	Notes
Representing Croatia
2000	World Junior Championships	Santiago, Chile	10th	7.38 m (wind: -1.5 m/s)
2001	European U23 Championships	Amsterdam, Netherlands	10th	7.51 m (wind: -0.6 m/s)
2002	European Indoor Championships	Vienna, Austria	24th (q)	7.51 m
2003	European U23 Championships	Bydgoszcz, Poland	6th	7.86 m (wind: 0.6 m/s)
2003	Universiade	Daegu, South Korea	8th	7.77 m
2005	European Indoor Championships	Madrid, Spain	6th	7.84 m
2005	Mediterranean Games	Almería, Spain	5th	7.89 m
2005	Universiade	İzmir, Turkey	4th	7.79 m
2006	European Championships	Gothenburg, Sweden	—	NM
2007	Universiade	Bangkok, Thailand	16th (q)	7.60 m
