= 2003 European Athletics U23 Championships – Men's long jump =

The men's long jump event at the 2003 European Athletics U23 Championships was held in Bydgoszcz, Poland, at Zawisza Stadion on 19 and 20 July.

== Medalists ==
Gold	Louis Tsatoumas; Greece
Silver	Volodymyr Zyuskov; Ukraine
Bronze	Danut Simion; Romania

== Results ==
=== Final ===
20 July

Rank	Name	Nationality	Attempts						Result	Notes
Rank	Name	Nationality	1	2	3	4	5	6	Result	Notes
1st place, gold medalist(s)	Louis Tsatoumas	Greece	7.78 (w: 0.1 m/s)	7.81 (w: 0.1 m/s)	x	7.88 (w: -0.2 m/s)	8.24 (w: -0.5 m/s)	x	8.24 (w: -0.5 m/s)	
2nd place, silver medalist(s)	Volodymyr Zyuskov	Ukraine	8.08 (w: 0.2 m/s)	7.95 (w: 0.3 m/s)	x	8.22 (w: 1.7 m/s)	6.22 (w: 0.6 m/s)	7.99 (w: 1.2 m/s)	8.22 (w: 1.7 m/s)	
3rd place, bronze medalist(s)	Danut Simion	Romania	7.77 (w: 0.3 m/s)	x	8.09 (w: 1.0 m/s)	x	x	8.0 (w: 0.9 m/s)	8.09 (w: 1.0 m/s)	
4	Arvydas Nazarovas	Lithuania	7.61 (w: 0.1 m/s)	x	7.89 (w: -0.7 m/s)	x	7.93 (w: 0.4 m/s)	x	7.93 (w: 0.4 m/s)	
5	Dimitrios Koukourdis	Greece	7.73 (w: 0.1 m/s)	7.40 (w: -0.2 m/s)	7.87 w (w: 2.4 m/s)	7.75 (w: 1.8 m/s)	5.23 w (w: 2.6 m/s)	7.67 (w: 1.2 m/s)	7.87 w (w: 2.4 m/s)	
6	Ivan Pucelj	Croatia	7.73 (w: -0.6 m/s)	7.85 (w: 0.1 m/s)	7.85 (w: 0.0 m/s)	x	7.74 (w: 1.2 m/s)	7.86 (w: 0.6 m/s)	7.86 (w: 0.6 m/s)	
7	Dmitriy Sapinskiy	Russia	7.82 (w: 1.2 m/s)	7.79 (w: 0.5 m/s)	x	x	x	7.82 (w: 1.4 m/s)	7.82 (w: 1.4 m/s)	
8	Morten Jensen	Denmark	7.56 (w: 0.7 m/s)	x	7.81 (w: 2.0 m/s)	7.72 w (w: 2.1 m/s)	7.68 (w: 0.3 m/s)	7.48 w (w: 2.5 m/s)	7.81 (w: 2.0 m/s)	
9	Oleksandr Patselya	Ukraine	7.79 (w: 0.6 m/s)	7.80 (w: -1.6 m/s)	7.53 (w: 0.5 m/s)				7.80 (w: -1.6 m/s)	
10	Luka Aračić	Croatia	7.79 (w: -0.2 m/s)	5.89 (w: 0.7 m/s)	7.24 (w: 0.3 m/s)				7.79 (w: -0.2 m/s)	
11	Jan Žumer	Slovenia	7.49 (w: 0.6 m/s)	7.71 (w: -0.3 m/s)	7.63 (w: 1.1 m/s)				7.71 (w: -0.3 m/s)	
12	Marijo Bakovic	Croatia	7.57 (w: -0.4 m/s)	7.70 (w: -0.7 m/s)	x				7.70 (w: -0.7 m/s)	

=== Qualifications ===
19 July
Qualifying 7.80 or 12 best to the Final

==== Group A ====
Rank	Name	Nationality	Result	Notes
1	Volodymyr Zyuskov	Ukraine	8.11 (w: 1.9 m/s)	Q
2	Morten Jensen	Denmark	7.97 (w: 0.9 m/s)	Q
3	Louis Tsatoumas	Greece	7.89 (w: 0.6 m/s)	Q
4	Arvydas Nazarovas	Lithuania	7.87 (w: 1.1 m/s)	Q
5	Ivan Pucelj	Croatia	7.78 (w: 1.8 m/s)	q
6	Dmitriy Sapinskiy	Russia	7.72 (w: 0.7 m/s)	q
7	Luka Aračić	Croatia	7.72 (w: 0.7 m/s)	q
8	Vytautas Seliukas	Lithuania	7.65 (w: 1.0 m/s)	
9	Atanas Rusenov	Bulgaria	7.42 (w: 1.1 m/s)	
10	Louis Burgess	United Kingdom	7.34 (w: 0.1 m/s)	
11	Admir Bregu	Albania	7.31 (w: -0.1 m/s)	
12	Massimo Marraffa	Italy	7.21 w (w: 3.0 m/s)	
13	Igor Brjuhhov	Estonia	7.10 (w: 1.8 m/s)	
14	Gennadiy Puzikov	Belarus	5.74 (w: 1.3 m/s)	

==== Group B ====
Rank	Name	Nationality	Result	Notes
1	Danut Simion	Romania	7.98 (w: 1.5 m/s)	Q
2	Jan Žumer	Slovenia	7.91 (w: 0.0 m/s)	Q
3	Marijo Baković	Croatia	7.84 (w: 1.1 m/s)	Q
4	Oleksandr Patselya	Ukraine	7.82 (w: 1.7 m/s)	Q
5	Dimitrios Koukourdis	Greece	7.81 (w: 1.8 m/s)	Q
6	Imre Lőrincz	Hungary	7.64 (w: 1.1 m/s)	
7	Jānis Karlivāns	Latvia	7.46 (w: 0.5 m/s)	
8	Povilas Mykolaitis	Lithuania	7.34 (w: -0.7 m/s)	
9	Gaspar Araújo	Portugal	7.25 (w: 1.2 m/s)	
10	Luca Maccapani	San Marino	6.40 (w: 1.3 m/s)	
	Petr Lampart	Czech Republic	NM	
	Paweł Pytlarczyk	Poland	NM	
	Ferhat Çiçek	Turkey	NM	

== Participation ==
According to an unofficial count, 27 athletes from 21 countries participated in the event.

- Albania (1)
- Belarus (1)
- Bulgaria (1)
- Croatia (3)
- Czech Republic (1)
- Denmark (1)
- Estonia (1)
- Greece (2)
- Hungary (1)
- Italy (1)
- Latvia (1)
- Lithuania (3)
- Poland (1)
- Portugal (1)
- Romania (1)
- Russia (1)
- San Marino (1)
- Slovenia (1)
- Turkey (1)
- Ukraine (2)
- United Kingdom (1)
