= 2003 IAAF World Indoor Championships – Men's long jump =

The men's long jump event at the 2003 IAAF World Indoor Championships was held on March 14–15.

== Medalists ==
Gold	Silver	Bronze
Dwight Phillips; United States	Yago Lamela; Spain	Miguel Pate; United States

== Results ==
=== Qualification ===
Qualifying perf. 8.10 (Q) or 8 best performers (q) advanced to the Final.

Rank	Group	Athlete	Nationality	#1	#2	#3	Result	Notes
1	B	Yago Lamela	Spain	8.12			8.12	Q
2	A	Petar Dachev	Bulgaria	7.76	7.98	X	7.98	q
3	B	Volodymyr Zyuskov	Ukraine	7.94	7.92	7.97	7.97	q
4	B	Miguel Pate	United States	7.82	7.96	–	7.96	q
5	B	Dwight Phillips	United States	7.95	7.85	–	7.95	q
6	B	Salim Sdiri	France	7.61	7.93	7.92	7.93	q
7	A	Luis Felipe Méliz	Cuba	7.75	7.84	X	7.84	q, SB
8	A	Siniša Ergotić	Croatia	7.76	7.59	7.83	7.83	
9	A	Raúl Fernández	Spain	X	7.80	7.68	7.80	
10	B	James Beckford	Jamaica	7.40	7.57	7.74	7.74	
11	A	Chris Tomlinson	Great Britain	7.56	7.61	7.73	7.73	
12	A	Yoelmis Pacheco	Cuba	7.48	X	7.71	7.71	PB
13	A	Li Dalong	China	7.57	7.56	X	7.57	
14	B	Valeriy Vasylyev	Ukraine	7.55	–	–	7.55	
15	A	Lao Jianfeng	China	X	7.46	7.36	7.46	
	B	Bogdan Țăruș	Romania				DQ	

=== Final ===
Rank	Athlete	Nationality	#1	#2	#3	#4	#5	#6	Result	Notes
1st place, gold medalist(s)	Dwight Phillips	United States	7.97	8.23	8.14	X	X	8.29	8.29	PB
2nd place, silver medalist(s)	Yago Lamela	Spain	7.99	8.13	X	8.20	8.11	8.28	8.28	
3rd place, bronze medalist(s)	Miguel Pate	United States	X	X	X	8.04	X	8.21	8.21	
4	Luis Felipe Méliz	Cuba	8.01	X	X	X	X	X	8.01	SB
5	Volodymyr Zyuskov	Ukraine	7.93	8.00	X	7.88	7.98	X	8.00	
6	Petar Dachev	Bulgaria	X	X	X	X	7.63	7.79	7.79	
7	Salim Sdiri	France	X	6.33	7.63	X	X	X	7.63	
	Bogdan Țăruș	Romania							DQ	
