= Jan Žumer =

Slovenian athlete (born 1982)

Jan Žumer (born 9 June 1982 in Ljubljana) is a Slovenian athlete who specializes in the 100 metres, 200 metres and the long jump.

In the long jump he competed at the 2002 European Indoor Championships, the 2005 European Indoor Championships and the 2006 European Championships without reaching the final round. In the 100 metres he competed at the 2006 European Championships (semi-final) and the 2007 World Championships (quarter-final) without reaching the final round.

He has a bachelor's degree in mechanical engineering.

== Competition record ==
Year	Competition	Venue	Position	Event	Notes
Representing Slovenia
2001	European Junior Championships	Grosseto, Italy	12th (h)	100 m	11.01 s
2001	European Junior Championships	Grosseto, Italy	13th (h)	200 m	21.62 s
2001	European Junior Championships	Grosseto, Italy	2nd	Long jump	7.72 m
2002	European Indoor Championships	Vienna, Austria	11th (q)	Long jump	7.85 m
2003	European U23 Championships	Bydgoszcz, Poland	11th	Long jump	7.71 m (-0.3 m/s)
2003	Universiade	Daegu, South Korea	5th	4 × 100 m relay	40.63 s
2003	Universiade	Daegu, South Korea	16th (q)	Long jump	7.44 m
2005	European Indoor Championships	Madrid, Spain	17th (q)	Long jump	7.70 m
2005	Mediterranean Games	Almería, Spain	6th	100 m	10.57 s
2005	Mediterranean Games	Almería, Spain	3rd	4 × 100 m relay	39.57 s
2005	Mediterranean Games	Almería, Spain	12th (q)	Long jump	7.48 m
2005	Universiade	İzmir, Turkey	14th (q)	Long jump	7.45 m
2006	European Championships	Gothenburg, Sweden	12th (sf)	100 m	10.43 s
2006	European Championships	Gothenburg, Sweden	–	4 × 100 m relay	DNF
2006	European Championships	Gothenburg, Sweden	26th (q)	Long jump	6.01 m
2007	World Championships	Osaka, Japan	31st (qf)	100 m	10.44 s
2009	Mediterranean Games	Pescara, Italy	9th (h)	200 m	21.25 s
2010	European Championships	Barcelona, Spain	25th (h)	200 m	21.17 s
2010	European Championships	Barcelona, Spain	–	4 × 100 m relay	DQ
2012	European Championships	Helsinki, Finland	28th (h)	200 m	21.50 s
2013	World Championships	Moscow, Russia	42nd (h)	200 m	21.35 s
2014	European Championships	Zurich, Switzerland	27th (h)	200 m	21.47 s

== Personal bests ==
- 60 metres - 6.68 s (2006, indoor)
- 100 metres - 10.21 s (2006)
- 200 metres - 20.59 s (2013)
- Long jump - 8.07 m (2004, indoor), 8.00 (2006, outdoor)
