= Povilas Mykolaitis =

Lithuanian long jumper (born 1983)

Personal information
- Born: 23 February 1983 (age 42)
- Height: 1.87 m (6 ft 1 1/2 in)
- Weight: 81 kg (179 lb)

Sport
- Country: Lithuania
- Sport: Athletics
- Event: Long jump
- Updated on 15 August 2012

Povilas Mykolaitis (born 23 February 1983 in Marijampolė) is a Lithuanian long jumper. His personal record is 8.15 metres, reached at 2011 in Kaunas, which also is national record.

He represented Lithuania in 2005 World Championships in Athletics and 2010 European Championships in Athletics without reaching the final.

== Achievements ==
Year	Competition	Venue	Position	Event	Notes
Representing Lithuania
2002	World Junior Championships	Kingston, Jamaica	11th	Long Jump	7.28 m (wind: 0.0 m/s)
2003	European U23 Championships	Bydgoszcz, Poland	17th (q)	Long jump	7.34 m (wind: -0.7 m/s)
2003	Universiade	Daegu, South Korea	25th (q)	Long Jump	7.34 m
2005	European Indoor Championships	Madrid, Spain	13th (q)	Long Jump	7.82 m
2005	European U23 Championships	Erfurt, Germany	3rd	Long Jump	8.00 m (wind: +1.1 m/s)
2005	World Championships	Helsinki, Finland	18th	Long Jump	7.64 m
2008	Lithuanian Championships	Kaunas, Lithuania	1st	Long Jump	7.86 m
2008	Lithuanian Championships	Kaunas, Lithuania	1st	Triple Jump	16.38 m
2009	Universiade	Belgrade, Serbia	15th (q)	Long Jump	7.40 m
2010	Lithuanian Championships	Kaunas, Lithuania	1st	Long Jump	7.94 m
2010	European Championships	Barcelona, Spain	13th (q)	Long Jump	7.94 m
2011	European Indoor Championships	Paris, France	5th	Long Jump	7.97 m
2011	Universiade	Shenzhen, China	18th (q)	Long Jump	7.53 m
