= Athletics at the 2004 Summer Olympics – Men's long jump =

Men's long jump at the Games of the XXVIII Olympiad
- Pictogram for athletics
- Venue: Athens Olympic Stadium
- Dates: 24–26 August
- Competitors: 40 from 30 nations
- Winning distance: 8.59

Medalists
1st place, gold medalist(s)		Dwight Phillips; United States
2nd place, silver medalist(s)		John Moffitt; United States
3rd place, bronze medalist(s)		Joan Lino Martínez; Spain

The men's long jump competition at the 2004 Summer Olympics in Athens was held at the Olympic Stadium on 24–26 August. Forty athletes from 30 nations competed. The event was won by Dwight Phillips of the United States, the nation's 21st gold medal in the men's long jump.

== Background ==
This was the 25th appearance of the event, which is one of 12 athletics events to have been held at every Summer Olympics. The returning finalists from the 2000 Games were the defending champion Iván Pedroso of Cuba, fourth-place finisher Olexiy Lukashevych of Ukraine, eighth-place finisher Dwight Phillips of the United States, ninth-place finisher Bogdan Tarus of Romania, and eleventh-place finisher Petar Dachev of Bulgaria. Then, Pedroso was at his peak and Phillips had not yet reached his; now, Phillips was at his peak and Pedroso was past his. Pedroso's string of four straight world championships ended in 2003, when Phillips took over.

Botswana and Panama each made their first appearance in the event. The United States appeared for the 24th time, most of any nation, having missed only the boycotted 1980 Games.

== Qualification ==
The qualification period for Athletics was 1 January 2003 to 9 August 2004. For the men's long jump, each National Olympic Committee was permitted to enter up to three athletes that had jumped 8.19 metres or further during the qualification period. The maximum number of athletes per nation had been set at 3 since the 1930 Olympic Congress. If an NOC had no athletes that qualified under that standard, one athlete that had jumped 8.05 metres or further could be entered.

== Competition format ==
The competition consisted of two rounds, qualification and final. In qualification, each athlete jumped three times (stopping early if they made the qualifying distance). At least the top twelve athletes moved on to the final; if more than twelve reached the qualifying distance of 8.10 metres, all who did so advanced. Distances were reset for the final round. Finalists jumped three times, after which the eight best jumped three more times (with the best distance of the six jumps counted).

== Records ==
Prior to the competition, the existing world record, Olympic record, and world leading jump were as follows:

World record	Mike Powell (USA)	8.95	Tokyo, Japan	30 August 1991
Olympic record	Bob Beamon (USA)	8.90	Mexico City, Mexico	18 October 1968
World Leading	Dwight Phillips (USA)	8.60	Linz, Austria	2 August 2004

No new world or Olympic records were set during the competition. The following national record was set during the competition:

Nation	Athlete	Round	Distance
Mauritius	Jonathan Chimier	Qualifying	8.28

== Schedule ==
All times are Greece Standard Time (UTC+2)

Date	Time	Round
Tuesday, 24 August 2004	19:45	Qualifying
Thursday, 26 August 2004	20:00	Final

== Results ==
=== Qualifying ===
Rule: Qualifying standard 8.10 (Q) or at least 12 best qualified (q).

Rank	Group	Athlete	Nation	1	2	3	Distance	Notes
1	A	Dwight Phillips	United States	8.31	—	—	8.31	Q
2	B	Jonathan Chimier	Mauritius	8.28	—	—	8.28	Q, NR
3	B	Chris Tomlinson	Great Britain	7.76	8.23	—	8.23	Q, SB
4	B	James Beckford	Jamaica	8.20	—	—	8.20	Q
5	A	John Moffitt	United States	7.80	8.17	—	8.17	Q
6	A	Joan Lino Martínez	Spain	8.10	—	—	8.10	Q
7	B	Vitaliy Shkurlatov	Russia	8.09	X	X	8.09	q
8	A	Bogdan Ţăruş	Romania	7.95	8.08	—	8.08	q
9	B	Salim Sdiri	France	8.08	X	X	8.08	q
10	B	Yago Lamela	Spain	7.95	8.06	8.06	8.06	q, =SB
11	A	Iván Pedroso	Cuba	8.05	X	8.04	8.05	q
12	A	Ignisious Gaisah	Ghana	X	7.84	8.05	8.05	q
13	B	Petar Dachev	Bulgaria	8.05	X	7.83	8.05	
14	A	Kafétien Gomis	France	X	7.99	X	7.99	
15	B	Víctor Castillo	Venezuela	7.70	7.62	7.98	7.98	
16	A	Kirill Sosunov	Russia	X	7.94	7.76	7.94	
17	A	Nikolay Atanasov	Bulgaria	X	7.88	7.90	7.90	
18	A	Volodymyr Zyuskov	Ukraine	X	7.88	X	7.88	
19	A	Nicola Trentin	Italy	7.86	X	X	7.86	
20	B	Kareem Streete-Thompson	Cayman Islands	X	7.85	7.68	7.85	
21	B	Osbourne Moxey	Bahamas	7.81	7.80	7.66	7.81	
22	B	Louis Tsatoumas	Greece	6.99	7.81	X	7.81	
23	B	Walter Davis	United States	7.37	7.70	7.80	7.80	
24	B	Tarik Bouguetaïb	Morocco	7.79	7.63	X	7.79	
25	A	Gable Garenamotse	Botswana	7.78	7.16	7.45	7.78	
26	A	Siniša Ergotić	Croatia	7.77	7.73	X	7.77	
27	A	Ndiss Kaba Badji	Senegal	7.47	7.65	7.74	7.74	
28	B	Yann Domenech	France	7.56	7.73	X	7.73	
29	A	Shinichi Terano	Japan	7.57	7.58	7.70	7.70	
30	A	Yahya Berrabah	Morocco	7.53	7.62	7.19	7.62	
31	B	Nils Winter	Germany	7.51	7.41	X	7.51	
32	B	Jadel Gregório	Brazil	7.50	X	X	7.50	
33	B	Gaspar Araújo	Portugal	X	7.27	7.49	7.49	
34	A	Zhou Can	China	7.36	7.47	X	7.47	
35	A	Dimitrios Filindras	Greece	X	7.45	7.42	7.45	
36	B	Irving Saladino	Panama	X	7.28	7.42	7.42	
37	B	Abdul Rahman Al-Nubi	Qatar	X	7.41	7.26	7.41	
38	A	Tamás Margl	Hungary	7.38	7.22	X	7.38	
39	A	Gregor Cankar	Slovenia	5.04	X	7.32	7.32	
—	A	Dimítrios Serélis	Greece	X	X	X	No mark	
—	B	Oleksiy Lukashevych	Ukraine	DNS				

=== Final ===
Rank	Athlete	Nation	1	2	3	4	5	6	Distance
1st place, gold medalist(s)	Dwight Phillips	United States	8.59	X	X	—	—	8.35	8.59
2nd place, silver medalist(s)	John Moffitt	United States	8.10	8.28	7.85	8.19	8.47 PB	8.24	8.47
3rd place, bronze medalist(s)	Joan Lino Martínez	Spain	7.79	8.32 PB	8.02	8.06	8.06	X	8.32
4	James Beckford	Jamaica	8.15	8.15	8.31 =SB	8.12	X	X	8.31
5	Chris Tomlinson	Great Britain	8.25	8.04	8.11	8.09	8.05	7.92	8.25
6	Ignisious Gaisah	Ghana	8.01	8.06	8.24	8.12	8.09	X	8.24
7	Iván Pedroso	Cuba	X	8.19	X	8.09	X	8.23 SB	8.23
8	Bogdan Ţăruş	Romania	8.21	X	8.08	X	X	8.16	8.21
9	Vitaliy Shkurlatov	Russia	7.88	8.04	X	Did not advance			8.04
10	Jonathan Chimier	Mauritius	8.03	7.79	6.78	Did not advance			8.03
11	Yago Lamela	Spain	7.98	X	X	Did not advance			7.98
12	Salim Sdiri	France	7.94	X	X	Did not advance			7.94
