= 2000 World Junior Championships in Athletics – Men's long jump =

The men's long jump event at the 2000 World Junior Championships in Athletics was held in Santiago, Chile, at Estadio Nacional Julio Martínez Prádanos on 21 and 22 October.

== Medalists ==
Gold	Cai Peng; China
Silver	Vladimir Zyuskov; Ukraine
Bronze	Yoelmis Pacheco; Cuba

== Results ==
=== Final ===
22 October

Rank	Name	Nationality	Attempts						Result	Notes
Rank	Name	Nationality	1	2	3	4	5	6	Result	Notes
1st place, gold medalist(s)	Cai Peng	China	7.88 (w: -0.5 m/s)	x	x	x	x	x	7.88 (w: -0.5 m/s)	
2nd place, silver medalist(s)	Vladimir Zyuskov	Ukraine	7.41 (w: -0.2 m/s)	7.79 w (w: +2.4 m/s)	7.84 (w: -0.6 m/s)	7.79 (w: +1.1 m/s)	7.57 (w: -1.6 m/s)	x	7.84 (w: -0.6 m/s)	
3rd place, bronze medalist(s)	Yoelmis Pacheco	Cuba	x	7.54 (w: -0.7 m/s)	7.33 (w: +0.1 m/s)	7.50 (w: -0.8 m/s)	7.71 (w: +0.5 m/s)	7.71 (w: 0.0 m/s)	7.71 (w: +0.5 m/s)	
4	Víctor Castillo	Venezuela	7.48 (w: -1.5 m/s)	7.66 (w: +0.6 m/s)	7.40 (w: -0.4 m/s)	7.58 (w: -0.2 m/s)	6.60 (w: 0.0 m/s)	x	7.66 (w: +0.6 m/s)	
5	Tim Parravicini	Australia	7.61 (w: -0.2 m/s)	x	7.65 (w: -2.5 m/s)	7.60 (w: +0.4 m/s)	7.54 (w: -0.6 m/s)	7.54 (w: +0.2 m/s)	7.65 (w: -2.5 m/s)	
6	Imre Lórincz	Hungary	7.65 (w: +0.1 m/s)	x	7.38 (w: +0.5 m/s)	-	7.15 (w: -0.7 m/s)	x	7.65 (w: +0.1 m/s)	
7	Daniel Kaczmarczyk	Poland	7.42 (w: -0.4 m/s)	7.57 (w: +0.7 m/s)	7.34 (w: -0.9 m/s)	x	x	7.42 (w: +0.7 m/s)	7.57 (w: +0.7 m/s)	
8	Luka Aračić	Croatia	7.48 (w: -1.3 m/s)	x	7.42 (w: -1.2 m/s)	7.40 (w: +0.7 m/s)	7.50 (w: -1.4 m/s)	x	7.50 (w: -1.4 m/s)	
9	Paul Thompson	Jamaica	7.43 (w: +0.2 m/s)	7.40 (w: 0.0 m/s)	x				7.43 (w: +0.2 m/s)	
10	Ivan Pucelj	Croatia	7.38 (w: -1.5 m/s)	x	x				7.38 (w: -1.5 m/s)	
11	Kevin Bartlett	Barbados	7.22 (w: +0.6 m/s)	x	7.35 (w: +0.6 m/s)				7.35 (w: +0.6 m/s)	
12	Chris Tomlinson	United Kingdom	7.18 (w: +0.1 m/s)	7.29 (w: +0.7 m/s)	7.24 (w: +1.1 m/s)				7.29 (w: +0.7 m/s)	

=== Qualifications ===
21 October

==== Group A ====
Rank	Name	Nationality	Attempts			Result	Notes
Rank	Name	Nationality	1	2	3	Result	Notes
1	Tim Parravicini	Australia	x	7.49 (w: +0.5 m/s)	7.62 (w: +0.6 m/s)	7.62 (w: +0.6 m/s)	q
2	Chris Tomlinson	United Kingdom	7.45 (w: +0.1 m/s)	7.25 (w: -0.7 m/s)	7.62 (w: +0.3 m/s)	7.62 (w: +0.3 m/s)	q
3	Cai Peng	China	x	7.62 (w: -0.3 m/s)	-	7.62 (w: -0.3 m/s)	q
4	Ivan Pucelj	Croatia	7.48 (w: 0.0 m/s)	7.41 (w: 0.0 m/s)	x	7.48 (w: 0.0 m/s)	q
5	Robert Kennedy	United States	5.05 (w: -0.2 m/s)	7.36 (w: +0.4 m/s)	7.35 (w: -0.3 m/s)	7.36 (w: +0.4 m/s)	
6	Daisuke Arakawa	Japan	7.20 (w: -1.1 m/s)	5.75 (w: 0.0 m/s)	7.31 (w: +0.8 m/s)	7.31 (w: +0.8 m/s)	
7	Isagani Peychär	Austria	x	7.27 (w: 0.0 m/s)	x	7.27 (w: 0.0 m/s)	
8	Morten Jensen	Denmark	x	x	7.25 (w: -0.2 m/s)	7.25 (w: -0.2 m/s)	
9	Daniel Mahlangu	South Africa	x	x	7.01 (w: +0.8 m/s)	7.01 (w: +0.8 m/s)	
10	Thiago Dias	Brazil	x	6.98 (w: 0.0 m/s)	x	6.98 (w: 0.0 m/s)	
11	Márkos Kafoúros	Greece	6.97 (w: +0.4 m/s)	6.66 (w: +0.4 m/s)	5.19 (w: +1.4 m/s)	6.97 (w: +0.4 m/s)	
12	Yahya Berrabah	Morocco	5.06 (w: +0.3 m/s)	6.82 (w: 0.0 m/s)	6.91 (w: -0.3 m/s)	6.91 (w: -0.3 m/s)	
13	Kakou Thierry Kouame	Côte d'Ivoire	6.86 (w: +0.3 m/s)	6.68 (w: +0.8 m/s)	6.46 (w: -0.3 m/s)	6.86 (w: +0.3 m/s)	
14	Eduardo Tagle	Chile	6.67 (w: -0.3 m/s)	6.78 (w: +0.5 m/s)	x	6.78 (w: +0.5 m/s)	
15	Andrius Daunoravicius	Lithuania	6.55 (w: +0.8 m/s)	x	6.76 (w: +0.6 m/s)	6.76 (w: +0.6 m/s)	
16	Thierry Adanabou	Burkina Faso	6.59 (w: +0.1 m/s)	3.93 (w: -1.2 m/s)	6.52 (w: -0.4 m/s)	6.59 (w: +0.1 m/s)	
17	Abdou Lam	Senegal	6.51 (w: NWI)	6.27 (w: -1.0 m/s)	6.21 (w: -1.1 m/s)	6.51 (w: NWI)	
	Jason Edwards	Bahamas	x	x	x	NM	
	Anton Andersson	Sweden	x	x	-	NM	

==== Group B ====
Rank	Name	Nationality	Attempts			Result	Notes
Rank	Name	Nationality	1	2	3	Result	Notes
1	Vladimir Zyuskov	Ukraine	7.44 (w: 0.0 m/s)	7.28 (w: -0.5 m/s)	7.69 (w: -0.5 m/s)	7.69 (w: -0.5 m/s)	Q
2	Daniel Kaczmarczyk	Poland	7.40 (w: +1.1 m/s)	7.42 (w: -0.4 m/s)	7.64 (w: -0.2 m/s)	7.64 (w: -0.2 m/s)	q
3	Luka Aračić	Croatia	x	7.58 (w: +0.6 m/s)	-	7.58 (w: +0.6 m/s)	q
4	Yoelmis Pacheco	Cuba	6.95 (w: -0.8 m/s)	7.53 (w: 0.0 m/s)	7.23 (w: +0.4 m/s)	7.53 (w: 0.0 m/s)	q
5	Imre Lórincz	Hungary	7.52 (w: +0.7 m/s)	7.26 (w: -0.2 m/s)	-	7.52 (w: +0.7 m/s)	q
6	Víctor Castillo	Venezuela	7.45 (w: +0.4 m/s)	7.51 (w: +0.1 m/s)	7.30 (w: -0.2 m/s)	7.51 (w: +0.1 m/s)	q
7	Paul Thompson	Jamaica	7.29 (w: -0.7 m/s)	6.96 (w: -0.5 m/s)	7.47 (w: +0.6 m/s)	7.47 (w: +0.6 m/s)	q
8	Kevin Bartlett	Barbados	7.18 (w: +0.1 m/s)	7.46 (w: +0.4 m/s)	6.96 (w: -0.1 m/s)	7.46 (w: +0.4 m/s)	q
9	Nico Grimbeeck	South Africa	7.39 (w: +0.4 m/s)	7.35 (w: +0.4 m/s)	7.22 (w: +0.1 m/s)	7.39 (w: +0.4 m/s)	
10	Laurent Pernic	France	6.99 (w: +0.4 m/s)	6.90 (w: -0.2 m/s)	7.20 (w: -0.4 m/s)	7.20 (w: -0.4 m/s)	
11	Leevan Sands	Bahamas	6.80 (w: +0.4 m/s)	7.16 (w: 0.0 m/s)	7.19 (w: +0.1 m/s)	7.19 (w: +0.1 m/s)	
12	Vladimir Letnicov	Moldova	x	7.16 (w: -0.3 m/s)	x	7.16 (w: -0.3 m/s)	
13	Loúis Tsátoumas	Greece	7.15 (w: +0.3 m/s)	6.94 (w: -0.7 m/s)	x	7.15 (w: +0.3 m/s)	
14	Abdullah Al-Waleed	Qatar	7.01 (w: +0.2 m/s)	7.09 (w: +0.3 m/s)	6.77 (w: -0.2 m/s)	7.09 (w: +0.3 m/s)	
15	Lars Jacob Woie	Norway	x	x	7.08 (w: -0.5 m/s)	7.08 (w: -0.5 m/s)	
16	Cleavon Dillon	Trinidad and Tobago	7.05 (w: -0.4 m/s)	6.63 (w: -0.2 m/s)	6.93 (w: +0.2 m/s)	7.05 (w: -0.4 m/s)	
17	Atanas Rusenov	Bulgaria	7.04 (w: +0.7 m/s)	x	6.82 (w: -0.1 m/s)	7.04 (w: +0.7 m/s)	
18	Jefferson Sabino	Brazil	6.94 (w: -0.5 m/s)	x	6.81 (w: +0.3 m/s)	6.94 (w: -0.5 m/s)	
19	Robert Etheridge	United States	6.81 (w: +0.6 m/s)	5.39 (w: +0.6 m/s)	6.58 (w: 0.0 m/s)	6.81 (w: +0.6 m/s)	
	Hiroyuki Oishi	Japan	x	-	-	NM	

== Participation ==
According to an unofficial count, 39 athletes from 32 countries participated in the event.

- Australia (1)
- Austria (1)
- Bahamas (2)
- Barbados (1)
- Brazil (2)
- Bulgaria (1)
- Burkina Faso (1)
- Chile (1)
- China (1)
- Côte d'Ivoire (1)
- Croatia (2)
- Cuba (1)
- Denmark (1)
- France (1)
- Greece (2)
- Hungary (1)
- Jamaica (1)
- Japan (2)
- Lithuania (1)
- Moldova (1)
- Morocco (1)
- Norway (1)
- Poland (1)
- Qatar (1)
- Senegal (1)
- South Africa (2)
- Sweden (1)
- Trinidad and Tobago (1)
- Ukraine (1)
- United Kingdom (1)
- United States (2)
- Venezuela (1)
