= Dwight Phillips =

American long jumper

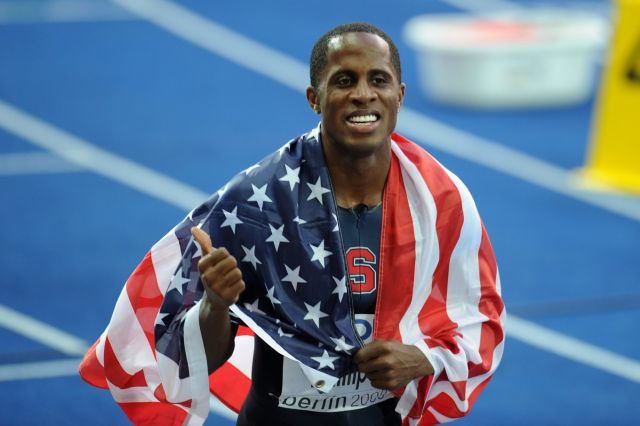

Personal information
- Nationality: American
- Born: October 1, 1977 (age 49) Decatur, Georgia
- Height: 5 ft 11 in (180 cm)
- Weight: 180 lb (82 kg)

Sport
- Country: United States
- Sport: Track and field
Medal record
Men's athletics
Representing the United States
Olympic Games
Gold medal – first place	2004 Athens	Long jump
World Championships
Gold medal – first place	2003 Paris	Long jump
Gold medal – first place	2005 Helsinki	Long jump
Gold medal – first place	2009 Berlin	Long jump
Gold medal – first place	2011 Daegu	Long jump
Bronze medal – third place	2007 Osaka	Long jump
World Indoor Championships
Gold medal – first place	2003 Birmingham	Long jump
Continental Cup
Gold medal – first place	2010 Split	Long jump

Dwight Phillips (born October 1, 1977) is an American former athlete and a four-time world champion in the long jump. He was the 2004 Olympic champion in the event. His personal best of 8.74 meters, set in 2009, makes him the joint fifth best jumper of all time.

Phillips has also competed in the 60 and 100-meter dashes. His personal record for the 100 m is 10.06 seconds and his time of 6.47 seconds over 60 m ranks among the top twenty fastest ever.

He is a now a track and field ambassador at SPIRE Institute and Academy. He will be joining the others such as Elizabeth Beisel and Caeleb Dressel representing the school. The goal of the partnership with SPIRE and the ambassadors is to emphasize the development of peak performance in athletics, academics, character and life.

== Career ==
Phillips was a promising sprinter in his early days, but concentrated on the triple jump while at University of Kentucky, before switching to the long jump after moving to Arizona State University in 2000. He competed at 2000 Sydney Olympics and finished eighth in the long jump with a jump of 8.06 m. He was the best American performer in the event. At his first World Championships he again finished eighth, after sustaining a hamstring tear.

He came to prominence in 2003, when he won both the IAAF indoor and outdoor World Championships. The indoor championship event was a close contest, with Phillips only beating Spain's Yago Lamela by a centimeter. He won the outdoor title with a winning margin of four centimeters over James Beckford of Jamaica.

In the run up to the 2004 Athens Olympics, Phillips was ranked number one in the world, and he won the gold medal by a margin of 12 cm over his compatriot John Moffitt. His winning jump of 8.59 meters was the fourth biggest in Olympic history, after Bob Beamon (1968) and Carl Lewis (1988, 1992).

His success continued at the next two World Championships, taking the gold medal at the 2005 Helsinki event, and winning bronze in Osaka two years later.

Phillips finished fourth in the long jump at the U.S. Olympic Trials, meaning he would not compete at the Beijing Olympics and would not defend his Olympic title.

On June 7, 2009, Phillips won the long jump at the Prefontaine Classic with a personal-best third jump of 8.74 m, defeating 2008 Olympic gold medalist Irving Saladino. A jump that put Phillips in the all-time performers top 10, despite a 1.2 metres/second headwind. He won the US Championships later that month, giving him another chance to reach the podium at the World Championships.

At the 2009 World Athletics Championships, in Berlin, Phillips won the gold in the long jump with a jump of 8.54 m. He repeated the feat in Daegu in 2011 with a leap of 8.45 m. During the championships in Daegu, Phillips was assigned the bib number 1111. After winning, Phillips proudly pointed to the number appropriate for finishing first in four championships.

A car accident just before the start of the 2012 outdoor season left him with back and neck injuries. Further to this, an Achilles tendon injury recurred and instead of preparing for the 2012 London Olympics, Phillips opted to undergo surgery to prolong his career.

At the 2013 World Athletics Championships, in Moscow, Phillips placed 11th in the long jump with a jump of 7.88 m and announced this was his last competition and retirement.

In 2018, Phillips was inducted into the National Track and Field Hall of Fame.

In September 2020, SPIRE Institute and Academy signed Phillips to become an international track and field ambassador.

== Personal life ==
Phillips is currently CEO and partner at Epiq.tv. Phillips is also the founder of The winners circles.

Phillips son, Dwight, is a running back for the Georgia Bulldogs.

== Personal bests ==
Event	Best	Venue	Date
Long jump	8.74 m	Eugene, Oregon, United States	June 7, 2009
Long jump (indoor)	8.29 m	Birmingham, United Kingdom	March 15, 2003
Triple jump	16.41 m	Boise, Idaho, United States	June 5, 1999
50 meters	5.70 s	Liévin, France	February 26, 2005
60 meters	6.47 s	Madrid, Spain	February 24, 2005
100 meters	10.06 s	Athens, Georgia, United States	May 9, 2009
200 meters	20.68 s	Tempe, Arizona, United States	March 30, 2002

- All information from IAAF Profile

== Achievements ==
Year	Competition	Venue	Position	Notes
Representing the United States
2000	Olympic Games	Sydney	8th	8.06 m
2001	World Championships	Edmonton, Canada	8th	7.92 m
2003	World Indoor Championships	Birmingham, England	1st	8.29 m
2003	World Championships	Paris, France	1st	8.32 m
2003	World Athletics Final	Monte Carlo, Monaco	1st	
2004	Olympic Games	Athens, Greece	1st	8.59 m
2004	World Athletics Final	Monte Carlo, Monaco	2nd	8.26 m
2005	World Championships	Helsinki, Finland	1st	8.60 m
2005	World Athletics Final	Monte Carlo, Monaco	1st	
2006	World Athletics Final	Stuttgart, Germany	6th	
2007	World Championships	Osaka, Japan	3rd	8.30 m
2009	World Championships	Berlin, Germany	1st	8.54 m
2011	World Championships	Daegu, South Korea	1st	8.45 m
2013	World Championships	Moscow, Russia	11th	7.88 m

== Awards ==
- Night of Legends Award 2024: USATF Legacy Award

Sporting positions
Preceded by (Spain) Yago Lamela	Men's long jump best year performance 2004–2005	Succeeded by (Panama) Irving Saladino
Preceded by (Panama) Irving Saladino	Men's long jump best year performance 2009	Succeeded by Incumbent
