= Valeriy Vasylyev =

Ukrainian long jumper (born 1976)

Valeriy Vasylyev (born 21 April 1976) is a retired athlete who specialised in the long jump. His biggest success was the gold medal at the 2003 Summer Universiade.

His personal bests in the event are 8.21 metres outdoors (2004) and 8.19 metres indoors (2003).

== Competition record ==
Year	Competition	Venue	Position	Notes
Representing Ukraine
2003	World Indoor Championships	Birmingham, United Kingdom	14th (q)	7.55 m
2003	Universiade	Daegu, South Korea	1st	8.07 m
2004	World Indoor Championships	Budapest, Hungary	20th (q)	7.64 m
2005	European Indoor Championships	Madrid, Spain	20th (q)	7.67 m
2007	European Indoor Championships	Birmingham, United Kingdom	10th (q)	7.75 m
