= Athletics at the 2007 Summer Universiade – Men's long jump =

The men's long jump event at the 2007 Summer Universiade was held on 11–12 August.

== Medalists ==
Gold	Silver	Bronze
Robert Crowther; Australia	Chao Chih-chien; Chinese Taipei	Roman Novotný; Czech Republic

== Results ==
=== Qualification ===
Qualification: 7.85 m (Q) or at least 12 best (q) qualified for the final.

Rank	Group	Athlete	Nationality	#1	#2	#3	Result	Notes
1	B	Konstantin Safronov	Kazakhstan	7.84w	7.93		7.93	Q
2	B	Roman Novotný	Czech Republic	7.63w	7.82	–	7.82	q
3	B	Chao Chih-chien	Chinese Taipei	7.66	7.81w	–	7.81w	q
4	A	Robert Crowther	Australia	7.66	7.80	–	7.80	q
5	B	Volodymyr Zyuskov	Ukraine	7.76	7.66	7.68	7.76	q
6	B	Tim Parravicini	Australia	7.73	–	–	7.73	q
7	A	Ahmed Houmida	Morocco	7.36	7.71	7.27	7.71	q, PB
8	B	Marijo Baković	Croatia	x	x	7.70	7.70	q
9	B	Han Jinru	China	7.40	x	7.64	7.64	q
10	A	Keeratikorm Janmanee	Thailand	7.21	7.64	7.25	7.64	q
11	A	Gerri Parson	Estonia	x	x	7.63	7.63	q
12	A	Dimitrios Diamandaras	Greece	7.50	7.53	7.62	7.62	q
13	B	Andrejs Maškancevs	Latvia	7.50	7.56	7.62	7.62	
14	A	Štepán Wagner	Czech Republic	x	7.62	x	7.62	
15	B	Marcin Starzak	Poland	7.47	7.16	7.60	7.60	
16	A	Ivan Pucelj	Croatia	x	x	7.60	7.60	
17	A	Naohiro Shinada	Japan	7.58	x	7.56	7.58	
18	B	Claudiu Bujin	Romania	7.57	7.38	7.43	7.57	
19	B	Hideaki Suzuki	Japan	7.41	7.55	7.52	7.55	
20	A	Tsai I-ta	Chinese Taipei	7.23	x	7.53	7.53	
21	A	Yochai Halevi	Israel	7.51	7.42	x	7.51	
22	A	Māris Grēniņš	Latvia	7.50	7.42	x	7.50	
23	A	Aleksander Petrov	Russia	7.44	7.48	x	7.48	
24	B	Sergey Slepukhin	Russia	x	7.47	x	7.47	
25	B	Sahk Tonis	Estonia	7.39	7.42	7.43	7.43	
26	A	Hong Seung Nam	South Korea	x	7.17	7.43	7.43	SB
27	B	Ahmed Khairallah	Egypt	x	x	7.42	7.42	
28	B	Kittisak Sukon	Thailand	7.35	7.38	x	7.38	
29	A	Adrian Vasile	Romania	7.35	7.15	x	7.35	
30	B	Jorge McFarlane	Peru	6.11	7.18	5.81	7.18	
31	B	Marc Habib	Lebanon	x	7.16	x	7.16	
32	B	Thomas Flensborg-Madsen	Denmark	7.10	7.00	6.71	7.10	
33	B	Mohd Yah Syahlil	Malaysia	6.91w	6.58	6.83	6.91w	
34	A	Ali Al-Rashdi	Oman	6.88	x	6.84	6.88	
35	A	Federico Gorrieri	San Marino	6.66	x	6.63	6.66	
36	A	Juan Carlos Nájera	Guatemala	6.64	x	x	6.64	
37	A	Wu Liqiang	China	x	x	6.61	6.61	
38	B	Moses Edweu Ejobu	Uganda	6.25	x	6.19	6.25	
39	B	Jermiah Shule	Kenya	6.13	6.23	6.20	6.23	
	A	Alireza Habibi Galankashi	Iran	x	x	x	NM	
	A	Mamadou Chérif Dia	Mali	x	x	x	NM	
	A	Haykal Moussallem	Lebanon				DNS	
	B	Ndiss Kaba Badji	Senegal				DNS	

=== Final ===
Rank	Athlete	Nationality	#1	#2	#3	#4	#5	$6	Result	Notes
1st place, gold medalist(s)	Robert Crowther	Australia	7.90	x	7.99	8.02	x	x	8.02	PB
2nd place, silver medalist(s)	Chao Chih-chien	Chinese Taipei	7.81	7.95	7.90	7.75	–	7.54	7.95	PB
3rd place, bronze medalist(s)	Roman Novotný	Czech Republic	7.61	7.83	7.88	7.77	7.82	7.76	7.88	
4	Han Jinru	China	7.68	7.87	–	x	x	7.55	7.87	PB
5	Volodymyr Zyuskov	Ukraine	x	7.69	7.81	7.86	x	7.73	7.86	
6	Konstantin Safronov	Kazakhstan	7.77	7.78	x	7.86	5.82	7.67	7.86	
7	Marijo Baković	Croatia	7.80	7.75	7.80	x	7.49	7.68	7.80	
8	Tim Parravicini	Australia	7.74	7.68	7.63	7.36	x	–	7.74	
9	Dimitrios Diamandaras	Greece	x	7.71	7.43				7.71	
10	Ahmed Houmida	Morocco	7.49	7.61	7.38				7.61	
11	Keeratikorm Janmanee	Thailand	7.58	7.32	7.25				7.58	
12	Gerri Parson	Estonia	x	7.54	7.46				7.54	
