= 2002 European Athletics Indoor Championships – Men's long jump =

The men's long jump event at the 2002 European Athletics Indoor Championships was held on March 1–2.

== Medalists ==
| Gold | Silver | Bronze |
|---|---|---|
| Raúl Fernández; Spain | Yago Lamela; Spain | Petar Dachev; Bulgaria |

== Results ==
=== Qualification ===
Qualifying perf. 7.95 (Q) or 8 best performers (q) advanced to the Final.

| Rank | Group | Athlete | Nationality | #1 | #2 | #3 | Result | Note |
|---|---|---|---|---|---|---|---|---|
| 1 | A | Petar Dachev | Bulgaria | 7.60 | X | 8.12 | 8.12 | Q |
| 2 | A | Vitaliy Shkurlatov | Russia | 7.84 | X | 8.00 | 8.00 | Q |
| 3 | A | Kader Klouchi | France | 7.77 | 7.89 | 7.98 | 7.98 | Q |
| 4 | A | Raúl Fernández | Spain | X | 7.96 | | 7.96 | Q |
| 5 | A | Olexiy Lukashevych | Ukraine | 7.96 | | | 7.96 | Q |
| 6 | B | Kirill Sosunov | Russia | 7.61 | 7.91 | 7.94 | 7.94 | q |
| 7 | B | Yago Lamela | Spain | 7.93 | X | – | 7.93 | q |
| 8 | B | Volodymyr Zyuskov | Ukraine | 7.91 | X | X | 7.91 | q |
| 9 | B | Gregor Cankar | Slovenia | 7.46 | 7.73 | 7.88 | 7.88 | |
| 10 | B | Grzegorz Marciniszyn | Poland | 7.74 | 7.87 | 7.70 | 7.87 | |
| 11 | A | Jan Žumer | Slovenia | 7.68 | X | 7.85 | 7.85 | |
| 12 | B | Nikolay Atanasov | Bulgaria | 7.83 | 7.69 | 7.57 | 7.83 | |
| 13 | B | Kenneth Kastren | Finland | 5.79 | 7.78 | 7.50 | 7.78 | |
| 14 | A | Kofi Amoah Prah | Germany | X | 7.76 | X | 7.78 | |
| 15 | B | Bostjan Fridrih | Slovenia | 7.64 | X | 7.72 | 7.72 | |
| 16 | B | Anastasios Makrinikolas | Greece | X | 7.72 | 7.41 | 7.72 | |
| 17 | A | Carlos Calado | Portugal | X | 7.67 | X | 7.67 | |
| 18 | B | Ciaran McDonagh | Ireland | X | 7.62 | X | 7.62 | |
| 19 | A | Mickaël Loria | France | 7.61 | X | X | 7.61 | |
| 20 | A | Roman Shchurenko | Ukraine | 7.56 | X | 7.60 | 7.60 | |
| 21 | A | Siniša Ergotić | Croatia | 7.59 | X | 7.59 | 7.59 | |
| 22 | B | Emmanuel Bangue | France | 7.54 | 7.58 | 4.25 | 7.58 | |
| 23 | A | Konstantinos Koukodimos | Greece | 7.56 | 7.33 | X | 7.56 | |
| 24 | B | Ivan Pucelj | Croatia | 7.36 | X | 7.51 | 7.51 | |
| 25 | B | Martin Lobel | Austria | 7.48 | 7.44 | 7.43 | 7.48 | |
| 26 | B | Schahriar Bigdeli | Germany | 7.42 | 7.19 | X | 7.42 | |
| 27 | A | Rachid Chouhal | Malta | 7.35 | 6.97 | X | 7.35 | NR |
| 28 | A | Marijo Baković | Croatia | 7.20 | 7.10 | 7.33 | 7.33 | |
| 29 | A | Bendis Spaho | Albania | 6.79 | 6.70 | 6.82 | 6.82 | |
| 30 | B | Danial Jahić | Yugoslavia | 6.76 | – | – | 6.76 | |

=== Final ===
| Rank | Athlete | Nationality | #1 | #2 | #3 | #4 | #5 | #6 | Result | Note |
|---|---|---|---|---|---|---|---|---|---|---|
| 1st place, gold medalist(s) | Raúl Fernández | Spain | 8.00 | 8.20 | 8.22 | X | X | X | 8.22 | PB |
| 2nd place, silver medalist(s) | Yago Lamela | Spain | X | 8.08 | 8.11 | 8.14 | 8.13 | 8.17 | 8.17 | SB |
| 3rd place, bronze medalist(s) | Petar Dachev | Bulgaria | 8.04 | 8.17 | X | X | 8.09 | 8.13 | 8.17 | |
| 4 | Olexiy Lukashevych | Ukraine | 7.94 | 8.11 | X | X | X | X | 8.11 | |
| 5 | Kirill Sosunov | Russia | 7.96 | 8.02 | X | 7.90 | 7.91 | X | 8.02 | |
| 6 | Volodymyr Zyuskov | Ukraine | 7.91 | X | 7.97 | X | X | 7.57 | 7.97 | |
| 7 | Vitaliy Shkurlatov | Russia | 7.95 | 7.92 | X | 7.64 | X | X | 7.95 | |
| | Kader Klouchi | France | X | X | X | X | X | X | NM | |
