= Tommi Evilä =

Finnish long jumper (born 1980)

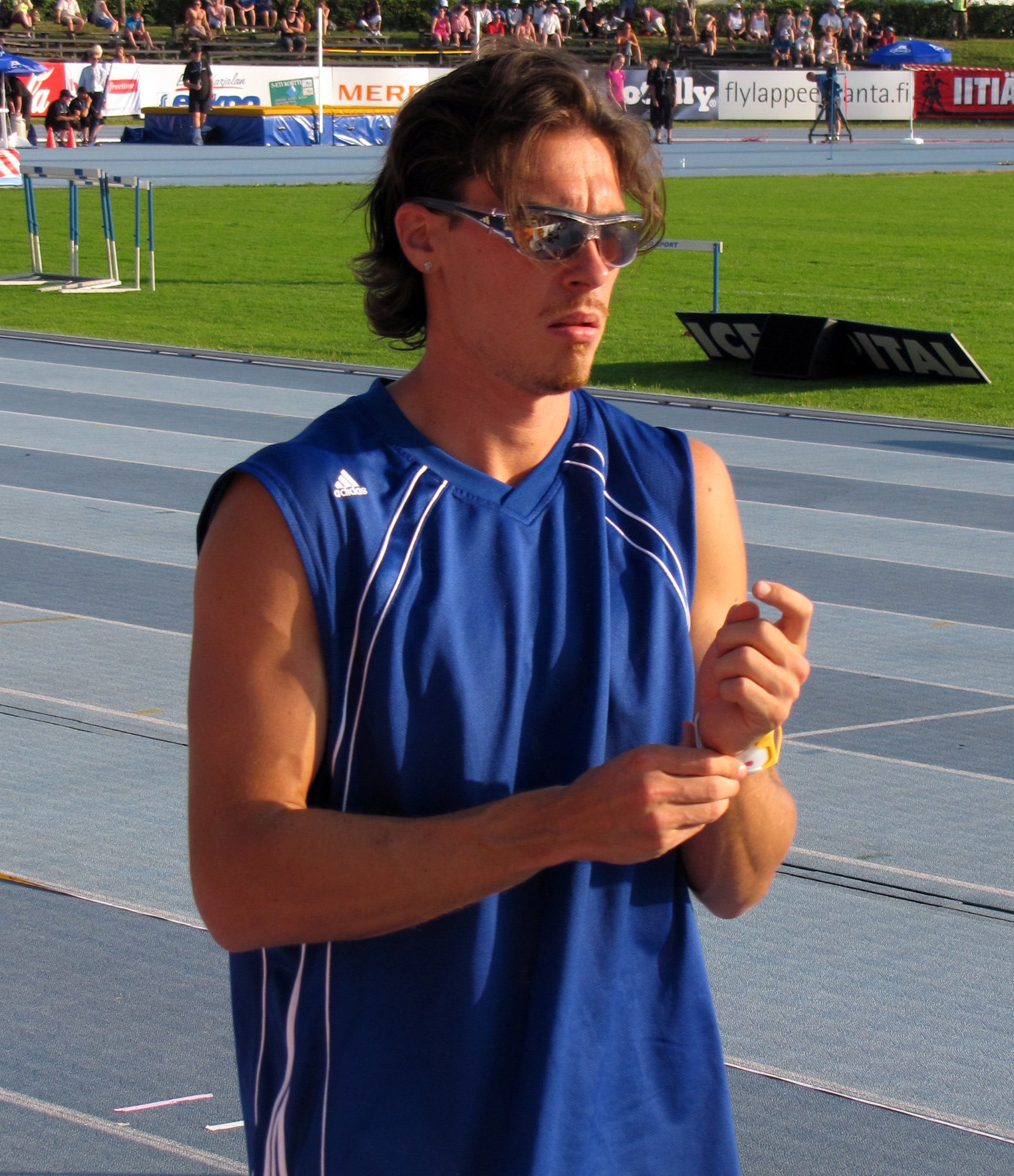
- Tommi Evilä 2010

Medal record

Representing Finland

Men's athletics

World Championships
Bronze medal – third place	2005 Helsinki	Long jump

Jaakko Tommi Kristian Evilä (born 6 April 1980 in Tampere) is a Finnish former long jumper. He gained fame following his surprise bronze in the 2005 Helsinki World Championships, which was Finland's only medal in the championships.

He won the bronze medal in a wind-aided 8.25 metre jump. Before the 2005 World Championships he had finished tenth at the 1998 World Junior Championships and fourth at the 2005 European Indoor Championships. He then improved his personal best jump to 8.19 metres in August, and finished sixth at the 2005 World Athletics Final.

Years troubled by injuries then followed. He did achieve a wind-aided result of 8.41 metres at the 2007 Finland-Sweden international. In June 2008 he set a Finnish national record of 8.22 metres in Gothenburg. He competed at the 2008 Olympic Games, but did not reach the final round. In 2009, Evila rediscovered some of his best form.

He competed in the 2010 Finnish Elite Games and came close to winning the jackpot, having won the long jump at four out of five meetings. It was not to be, however, as he finished third in the final competition. This dropped him into fourth place overall and Levern Spencer of St. Lucia topped the rankings to win the prize.

== Competition record ==
Year	Competition	Venue	Position	Notes
Representing Finland
1998	World Junior Championships	Annecy, France	10th	7.39 m (wind: +0.4 m/s)
2001	European U23 Championships	Amsterdam, Netherlands	5th	7.77 m (wind: 0.6 m/s)
2005	European Indoor Championships	Madrid, Spain	4th	7.97 m
2005	World Championships	Helsinki, Finland	3rd	8.25 m
2008	Olympic Games	Beijing, China	17th (q)	7.88 m
2009	European Indoor Championships	Turin, Italy	7th	7.86 m
2009	World Championships	Berlin, Germany	14th (q)	8.01 m
2010	World Indoor Championships	Doha, Qatar	13th (q)	7.77 m
2010	European Championships	Barcelona, Spain	10th	7.91 m
2012	European Championships	Helsinki, Finland	10th	7.79 m
2013	European Indoor Championships	Gothenburg, Sweden	6th	7.96 m
