= Starzak =

Starzak is a surname. Notable people with the surname include:

- Marcin Starzak (born 1985), Polish long jumper
- Richard Starzak (born 1959), British animator
