= Gaspar Araújo =

Portuguese long jumper

Gaspar Araújo (born 17 December 1981) is a Portuguese long jumper.

His personal best is 8.10 metres, achieved in June 2004 in Istanbul.

== Competition record ==
Year	Competition	Venue	Position	Event	Notes
Representing Portugal
2003	European U23 Championships	Bydgoszcz, Poland	20th (q)	Long jump	7.25 m (wind: 1.2 m/s)
2003	European U23 Championships	Bydgoszcz, Poland	16th (q)	Triple jump	15.41 m (wind: -0.6 m/s)
2004	Ibero-American Championships	Huelva, Spain	6th	Long jump	7.69 m
2004	Olympic Games	Athens, Greece	34th (q)	Long jump	7.49 m
2005	European Indoor Championships	Madrid, Spain	5th	Long jump	7.87 m
2005	Universiade	İzmir, Turkey	5th	Long jump	7.61 m
2008	Ibero-American Championships	Iquique, Chile	1st	Long jump	7.82 m
2009	European Indoor Championships	Turin, Italy	23rd (q)	Long jump	7.44 m
2010	European Championships	Barcelona, Spain	19th (q)	Long jump	7.87 m
