= Dimitrios Filindras =

Greek long jumper (born 1973)

Personal information
- Full name: Dimitrios Filindras
- Nationality: Greece
- Born: 9 February 1973 (age 53) Larissa, Greece
- Height: 1.74 m (5 ft 8 1/2 in)
- Weight: 68 kg (150 lb)

Sport
- Sport: Athletics
- Event: Long jump
- Club: Pelasgos Larissas

Achievements and titles
- Personal best: Long jump: 8.30 (2003)

Dimitrios Filindras (Greek: Δημήτριος Φιλινδράς; born 9 February 1973 in Larissa) is a retired Greek long jumper. He was selected to compete for the host nation Greece's largest Olympic team in the men's long jump at the 2004 Summer Olympics, and also trained throughout his athletics career for the sport club Pelasgos Larissas. In June 2003, Filindras recorded his best jump at 8.30 m from the Venizelia International Athletics Meet in Chania.

Filindras qualified for the Greek squad in the men's long jump at the 2004 Summer Olympics in Athens by successfully jumping an Olympic A-standard of 8.30 m from the Venizelia International Athletics Meet in Chania. Filindras started off abruptly with a foul, until he soared out to a legal leap at 7.45 m on his second attempt. Since his third jump was slightly shorter than his best by three centimetres, Filindras wound only to thirty-fifth spot in a field of forty-one athletes, and did not advance past the qualifying round. 8.30 was the joint ninth best in the world in 2003, and the third best in the Balkans, behind compatriot Louis Tsatoumas (8.34) and Nikolay Atanasov (8.31), and somewhat ahead of the third best Greek jumper, Dimitrios Serelis (8.21, 21st).
