= Joan Lino Martínez =

Spanish long jumper (born 1978)

Personal information
- Full name: Joan Lino Martínez Armenteros
- Nationality: Cuban, Spanish
- Born: 11 January 1978 (age 48) Havana, Cuba

Sport
- Country: Cuba, Spain
Medal record
Athletics
Representing Cuba
CAC Junior Championships (U20)
Gold medal – first place	1996 San Salvador	Long jump
Gold medal – first place	1996 San Salvador	4 × 100 m relay
Representing Spain
Olympic Games
Bronze medal – third place	2004 Athens	Long jump

Joan Lino Martínez Armenteros (born 11 January 1978) is a long jumper. Born in Cuba, he represents Spain internationally. He previously competed for his country of birth.

== Career ==
Martínez was born to a Cuban father and Spanish mother. After his switch from Cuba to Spain, he did not compete internationally until 2004, when he won the bronze medal in the Olympic Games. In 2005, he became European indoor champion, and in the 2005 World Championships, he finished fourth with 8.24, one centimetre short of the bronze medal.

== Achievements ==
Year	Competition	Venue	Position	Event	Notes
Representing Cuba
1996	Central American and Caribbean Junior Championships (U-20)	San Salvador, El Salvador	1st	Long jump	7.46 m
1996	Central American and Caribbean Junior Championships (U-20)	San Salvador, El Salvador	1st	4 × 100 m relay	40.11 s
1996	World Junior Championships	Sydney, Australia	7th	Long jump	7.59 m (wind: +0.1 m/s)
1996	World Junior Championships	Sydney, Australia	9th (h)	4 × 100 m relay	40.31 s
1998	Central American and Caribbean Games	Maracaibo, Venezuela	3rd	Long jump	8.09 m
2000	Ibero-American Championships	Rio de Janeiro, Brazil	3rd	Long jump	7.71 m
Representing Spain
2004	Ibero-American Championships	Huelva, Spain	1st	Long jump	8.26 m
2004	Olympic Games	Athens, Greece	3rd	Long jump	8.32 m (1.3 m/s)
2005	European Indoor Championships	Madrid, Spain	1st	Long jump	8.37 m
2005	World Championships	Helsinki, Finland	4th	Long jump	8.24 m w (2.9 m/s)
2006	European Championships	Gothenburg, Sweden	14th	Long jump	7.83 m w (2.1 m/s)
2010	Ibero-American Championships	San Fernando, Spain	2nd	Long jump	7.68 m
2010	European Championships	Barcelona, Spain	23rd	Long jump	7.63 m
