= Tim Parravicini =

Australian long jumper

Tim Parravicini (born 25 April 1981) is a retired Australian long jumper.

He finished fifth at the 2000 World Junior Championships, ninth at the 2002 Commonwealth Games, eighth at the 2002 World Cup, seventh at the 2006 Commonwealth Games and eighth at the 2007 Summer Universiade.

He became Australian champion in 2002 and 2007. His personal best jump was 8.18 metres, achieved in February 2005 in Canberra. He retired after the 2008 season.
