= Marijo Baković =

Croatian long jumper (born 1982)

Marijo Baković (born 11 April 1982) is a Croatian retired long jumper.

He finished seventh at the 1999 World Youth Championships and eleventh at the 2001 Summer Universiade. He also competed at the 2002 European Indoor Championships and the 2005 Summer Universiade without reaching the final.

Baković became Croatian long jump champion in 2003 and 2004, rivalling with Ivan Pucelj. He also became indoor champion in 2001 and 2004.

His personal best jump was 7.99 metres, achieved in July 2003 in Tarvisio.

== Competition record ==
Year	Competition	Venue	Position	Notes
Representing Croatia
1999	World Youth Championships	Bydgoszcz, Poland	7th	7.25 m
2001	European Junior Championships	Grosseto, Italy	9th	7.27 m (w)
2001	Universiade	Beijing, China	11th	7.32 m
2002	European Indoor Championships	Vienna, Austria	28th (q)	7.33 m
2003	European U23 Championships	Bydgoszcz, Poland	12th	7.70 m (wind: -0.7 m/s)
2003	Universiade	Daegu, South Korea	14th (q)	7.54 m
2005	Mediterranean Games	Almería, Spain	8th	7.79 m
2005	Universiade	İzmir, Turkey	18th (q)	7.37 m
2007	Universiade	Bangkok, Thailand	7th	7.80 m
