= 2005 European Athletics U23 Championships – Men's long jump =

The men's long jump event at the 2005 European Athletics U23 Championships was held in Erfurt, Germany, at Steigerwaldstadion on 15 and 16 July.

== Medalists ==
Gold	Dănuţ Simion; Romania
Silver	Dmitriy Sapinskiy; Russia
Bronze	Povilas Mykolaitis; Lithuania

== Results ==
=== Final ===
16 July

Rank	Name	Nationality	Attempts						Result	Notes
Rank	Name	Nationality	1	2	3	4	5	6	Result	Notes
1st place, gold medalist(s)	Dănuţ Simion	Romania	x	7.68 (w: -0.4 m/s)	x	8.12 (w: 0.8 m/s)	7.91 (w: -0.2 m/s)	x	8.12 (w: 0.8 m/s)	
2nd place, silver medalist(s)	Dmitriy Sapinskiy	Russia	x	7.63 (w: 0.8 m/s)	x	7.84 (w: 0.4 m/s)	8.01 (w: 1.1 m/s)	7.75 (w: 1.3 m/s)	8.01 (w: 1.1 m/s)	
3rd place, bronze medalist(s)	Povilas Mykolaitis	Lithuania	x	7.79 (w: 1.1 m/s)	7.91 (w: 1.5 m/s)	8.00 (w: 1.1 m/s)	7.91 (w: -0.3 m/s)	7.92 w (w: 2.3 m/s)	8.00 (w: 1.1 m/s)	
4	Peter Rapp	Germany	7.59 (w: 0.9 m/s)	x	x	7.52 (w: 0.7 m/s)	7.95 (w: 1.7 m/s)	7.72 (w: 0.1 m/s)	7.95 (w: 1.7 m/s)	
5	Michał Łukasiak	Poland	x	x	7.66 (w: 1.0 m/s)	x	7.78 (w: 0.3 m/s)	7.84 (w: 1.0 m/s)	7.84 (w: 1.0 m/s)	
6	Marcin Starzak	Poland	7.62 (w: 1.2 m/s)	x	x	7.77 (w: 0.0 m/s)	7.72 (w: 0.7 m/s)	7.77 (w: 0.9 m/s)	7.77 (w: 0.9 m/s)	
7	Dimitrios Diamantaras	Greece	7.50 (w: 1.9 m/s)	7.67 (w: 1.5 m/s)	7.68 (w: 0.9 m/s)	7.20 (w: 0.5 m/s)	7.65 (w: 0.4 m/s)	7.76 (w: 1.4 m/s)	7.76 (w: 1.4 m/s)	
8	Tomáš Pour	Czech Republic	x	7.68 (w: 1.2 m/s)	5.33 (w: 2.0 m/s)	7.19 (w: 0.9 m/s)	x	7.07 (w: 1.7 m/s)	7.68 (w: 1.2 m/s)	
9	Oleksandr Patselya	Ukraine	7.48 w (w: 2.6 m/s)	7.48 (w: 0.5 m/s)	7.43 (w: 1.6 m/s)				7.48 (w: 0.5 m/s)	
10	Artūrs Āboliņš	Latvia	x	7.41 (w: 0.0 m/s)	x				7.41 (w: 0.0 m/s)	
11	Jonathan Moore	United Kingdom	7.35 (w: 0.8 m/s)	x	x				7.35 (w: 0.8 m/s)	
12	Dmytro Bilotserkivskyy	Ukraine	x	7.34 (w: -0.4 m/s)	x				7.34 (w: -0.4 m/s)	

=== Qualifications ===
15 July
Qualifying 7.75 or 12 best to the Final

==== Group A ====
Rank	Name	Nationality	Result	Notes
1	Dănuţ Simion	Romania	8.03 (w: -0.5 m/s)	Q
2	Dimitrios Diamantaras	Greece	7.61 (w: 0.8 m/s)	q
3	Dmitriy Sapinskiy	Russia	7.60 (w: -0.7 m/s)	q
5	Dmytro Bilotserkivskyy	Ukraine	7.58 (w: 0.1 m/s)	q
6	Petko Petrov	Bulgaria	7.24 (w: -1.1 m/s)	
7	Petr Lampart	Czech Republic	7.22 (w: -0.5 m/s)	
8	Erdun Mutlu	Turkey	7.17 (w: 0.8 m/s)	
9	Arsen Sargsyan	Armenia	7.16 (w: -1.2 m/s)	
10	Michał Niemyjski	Poland	7.15 (w: 0.1 m/s)	

==== Group B ====
Rank	Name	Nationality	Result	Notes
1	Tomáš Pour	Czech Republic	7.82 (w: 0.2 m/s)	Q
2	Povilas Mykolaitis	Lithuania	7.78 (w: -1.1 m/s)	Q
3	Peter Rapp	Germany	7.69 (w: -0.6 m/s)	q
4	Jonathan Moore	United Kingdom	7.62 (w: 0.4 m/s)	q
5	Oleksandr Patselya	Ukraine	7.57 (w: 0.1 m/s)	q
6	Artūrs Āboliņš	Latvia	7.51 (w: -0.4 m/s)	q
7	Marcin Starzak	Poland	7.50 (w: -0.6 m/s)	q
8	Petros Katsis	Greece	7.50 (w: 0.1 m/s)	
9	Fabien Faucher	France	7.48 (w: 0.8 m/s)	
10	Claudiu Bujin	Romania	7.31 (w: -0.9 m/s)	

== Participation ==
According to an unofficial count, 20 athletes from 14 countries participated in the event.

- Armenia (1)
- Bulgaria (1)
- Czech Republic (2)
- France (1)
- Germany (1)
- Greece (2)
- Latvia (1)
- Lithuania (1)
- Poland (3)
- Romania (2)
- Russia (1)
- Turkey (1)
- Ukraine (2)
- United Kingdom (1)
