= Yoelmis Pacheco =

Cuban long jumper

Yoelmis Pacheco (born 9 June 1982) is a retired Cuban long jumper.

He won the gold medal at the 1998 World Youth Games, the silver medal at the 1999 World Youth Championships and the bronze medal at the 2000 World Junior Championships. At 2003, he also competed at the 2003 World Indoor Championships without reaching the final.

He became Cuban champion in 2001, 2003 and 2004, competing with Iván Pedroso and Ibrahim Camejo among others. His personal best jump was 8.18 metres, achieved in February 2002 in Havana.
