= Marcin Starzak =

Polish long jumper (born 1985)

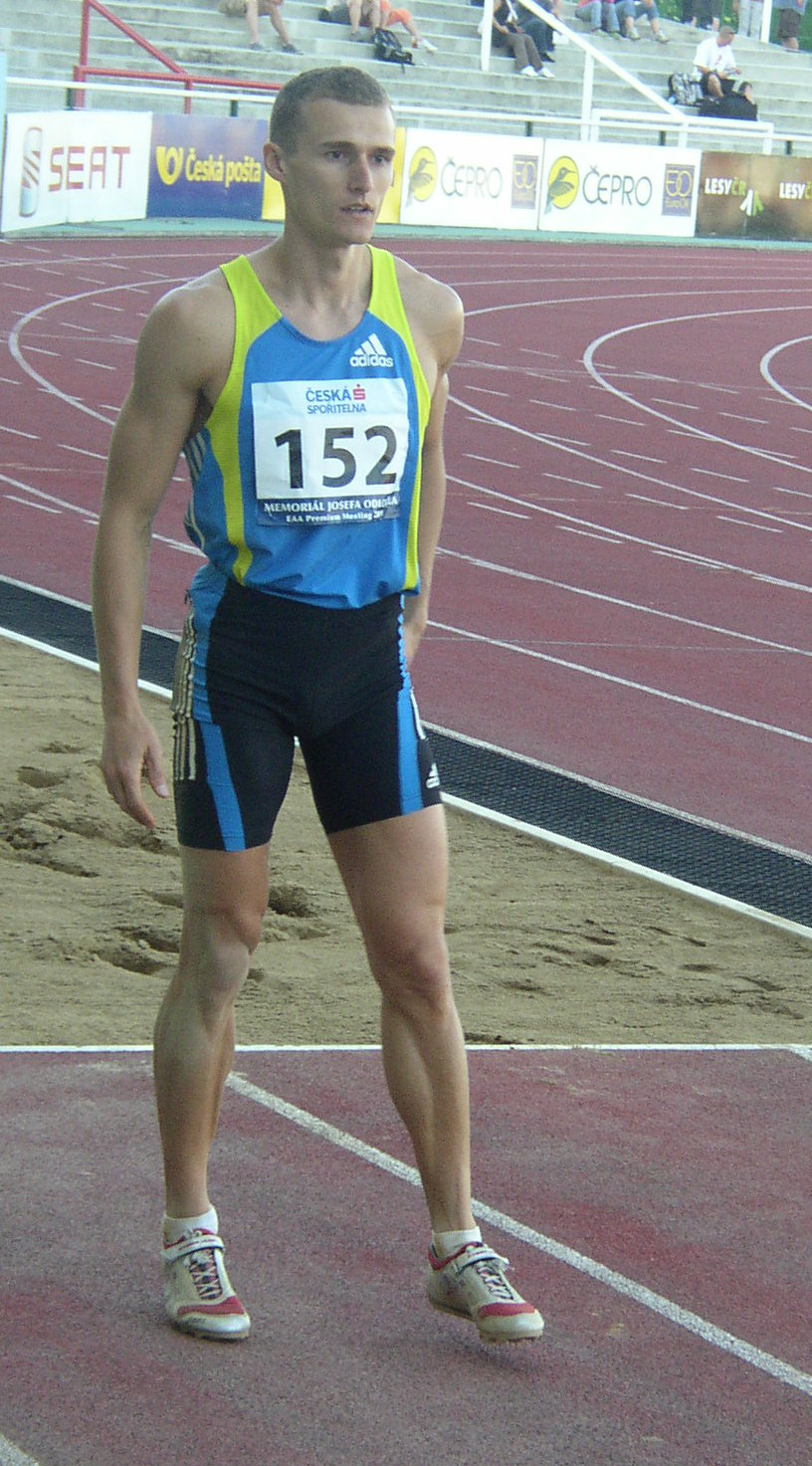
Marcin Starzak at the 2010 Josef Odložil Memorial in Prague

Marcin Starzak (born 20 October 1985 in Kraków) is a Polish long jumper.

He finished sixth at the 2007 European Indoor Championships and seventh at the 2008 World Indoor Championships. He also competed at the 2005 European Indoor Championships, the 2006 European Championships, the 2007 World Championships and the 2008 Olympic Games without reaching the final. However, in 2009 Starzak claimed bronze in the European Indoor Championships, in Turin, Italy.

His personal best jump is 8.21 metres, achieved in July 2007 in Salamanca. His indoor best of 8.18 metres, set in Turin, is the Polish national record.

== Achievements ==
Year	Competition	Venue	Position	Notes
Representing Poland
2005	European Indoor Championships	Madrid, Spain	16th (q)	7.74 m
2005	European U23 Championships	Erfurt, Germany	6th	7.77 m (wind: +0.9 m/s)
2006	European Championships	Gothenburg, Sweden	18th (q)	7.73 m
2006	European Cup	Málaga, Spain	3rd	8.09 m
2007	European Indoor Championships	Birmingham, United Kingdom	6th	7.88 m
2007	Universiade	Bangkok, Thailand	15th (q)	7.60 m
2007	World Championships	Osaka, Japan	14th (q)	7.92 m
2008	World Indoor Championships	Valencia, Spain	7th	7.74 m
2008	Olympic Games	Beijing, China	33rd (q)	7.62 m
2009	European Indoor Championships	Torino, Italy	3rd	8.18 m (iNR)
2009	Universiade	Belgrade, Serbia	3rd	8.10 m
