= Yahya Berrabah =

Moroccan long jumper (born 1981)

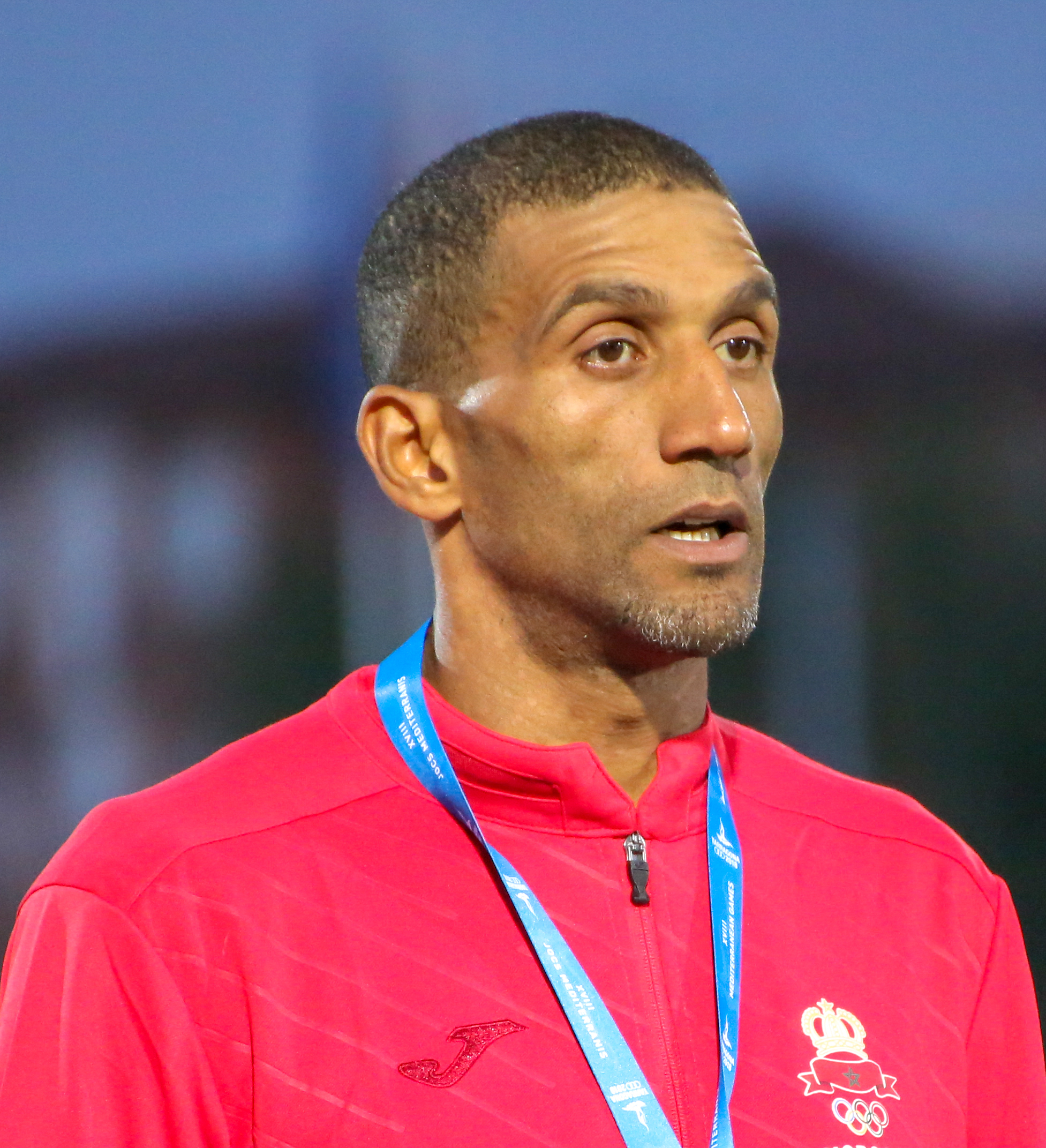
- Yahya Berrabah at the 2018 Mediterranean Games

Personal information
- Native name: يحيى بالرابح
- Born: Yahya Berrabah; 13 October 1981 (age 44) Oujda, Morocco
Medal record
Men's athletics
Representing Morocco
African Championships
Gold medal – first place	2008 Addis Ababa	Long jump
Bronze medal – third place	2018 Asaba	Long jump
Jeux de la Francophonie
Gold medal – first place	2009 Beirut	Long jump
Silver medal – second place	2005 Niamey	Triple jump

Yahya Berrabah (Arabic: يحيى بالرابح, born 13 October 1981 in Oujda) is a Moroccan long jumper. He is a five-time participant at the World Championships in Athletics (2003–2011) and has twice represented his country at the Olympic Games. He was the 2008 African Champion in the long jump. His personal best of 8.40 metres is the Moroccan national record.

He finished seventh at the 2002 African Championships. At the 2006 African Championships he finished eighth in the long jump and seventh in the triple jump. He won the gold medal at the 2008 African Championships. He competed at the World Championships 2003, 2005 and 2007 as well as the Olympic Games in 2004 and 2008 without reaching the final.

He broke the Moroccan national record in Rabat on 23 May 2009: his jump of 8.38 metres at the Meeting Mohammed VI d' Athlétisme beat Younés Moudrik's record which had stood for almost nine years. He improved this to 8.40 m at the 2009 Jeux de la Francophonie in Beirut – a mark which won him the gold medal and a games record. At the IAAF Grand Prix in Zagreb on 31 August 2008 he tested positive for cannabis and was subsequently handed a public reprimand. He performed less well in 2010, failing to pass the eight-metre mark, but cleared 8.37 m in July 2011 in Barcelona. He went on to finish fourth at the 2011 World Championships in Athletics.

Berrabah failed an out-of-competition drug test for EPO in November 2011 and was initially suspended for two years. The ban was later extended to 4 years, ending 5 January 2016.

== Major competition record ==
Year	Competition	Venue	Position	Event	Notes
Representing Morocco
2000	World Junior Championships	Santiago, Chile	30th (q)	Long jump	6.91 m (-0.3 m/s)
2002	African Championships	Radès, Tunisia	7th	Long jump	7.85 m (w)
2003	World Championships	Paris, France	28th (q)	Long jump	7.62 m
2004	World Indoor Championships	Budapest, Hungary	23rd (q)	Long jump	7.53 m
2004	Olympic Games	Athens, Greece	30th (q)	Long jump	7.62 m
2005	World Championships	Helsinki, Finland	20th (q)	Long jump	7.33 m
2005	Jeux de la Francophonie	Niamey, Niger	2nd	Triple jump	16.44 m
2006	African Championships	Bambous, Mauritius	8th	Long jump	7.64 m (w)
2006	African Championships	Bambous, Mauritius	7th	Triple jump	15.85 m
2007	World Championships	Osaka, Japan	24th (q)	Long jump	7.72 m
2007	Pan Arab Games	Cairo, Egypt	6th	Long jump	7.62 m
2008	African Championships	Addis Ababa, Ethiopia	1st	Long jump	8.04 m
2008	Olympic Games	Beijing, China	17th (q)	Long jump	7.88 m
2009	Mediterranean Games	Pescara, Italy	9th	Long jump	7.31 m
2009	World Championships	Berlin, Germany	10th	Long jump	7.83 m
2009	Jeux de la Francophonie	Beirut, Lebanon	1st	Long jump	8.40 m (GR)
2010	World Indoor Championships	Doha, Qatar	23rd (q)	Long jump	7.52 m
2011	World Championships	Daegu, South Korea	4th	Long jump	8.23 m
2017	Islamic Solidarity Games	Baku, Azerbaijan	1st	Long jump	8.07 m
2017	World Championships	London, United Kingdom	28th (q)	Long jump	7.49 m
2018	Mediterranean Games	Tarragona, Spain	1st	Long jump	8.02 m
2018	African Championships	Asaba, Nigeria	3rd	Long jump	8.14 m (w)
2019	Arab Championships	Cairo, Egypt	2nd	Long jump	8.03 m
2019	World Championships	Doha, Qatar	26th (q)	Long jump	7.37 m
