= Bogdan Țăruș =

Romanian long jumper

Personal information
- Born: 1 August 1975 (age 51) Piatra Neamț, Neamț, Romania
- Height: 1.91 m (6 ft 3 in)
- Weight: 78 kg (172 lb)

Sport
- Sport: Track and field
- Event: Long jump
- Club: CS Farul Constanța, CSM PAB Arad
Medal record
Men's athletics
Representing Romania
European Championships
Silver medal – second place	1998 Budapest	Long jump
European Indoor Championships
Silver medal – second place	1996 Stockholm	Long jump
Silver medal – second place	2000 Ghent	Long jump
Silver medal – second place	2005 Madrid	Long jump

Gabriel Bogdan Țăruș (Romanian pronunciation: [ɡabriˈel boɡˈdan tsəˈruʃ]; born 1 August 1975) is a former Romanian athlete who competed in long jump. He has, success in World Championships. His personal best is 8.29 metres, achieved in 1996. He retired in the summer of 2006.

== Competition record ==
Year	Competition	Venue	Position	Notes
Representing Romania
1992	World Junior Championships	Seoul, South Korea	13th (q)	7.41 m (wind: +0.6 m/s)
1993	European Junior Championships	San Sebastián, Spain	7th	7.46 m
1994	World Junior Championships	Lisbon, Portugal	2nd	8.01 m (wind: +2.0 m/s)
1994	European Championships	Helsinki, Finland	15th (q)	7.79 m
1995	World Championships	Gothenburg, Sweden	23rd (q)	7.79 m
1995	Universiade	Fukuoka, Japan	17th (q)	7.67 m
1996	European Indoor Championships	Stockholm, Sweden	2nd	8.03 m
1996	Olympic Games	Atlanta, United States	15th (q)	7.96 m
1997	European U23 Championships	Turku, Finland	4th	7.96 m (wind: +0.2 m/s)
1997	World Championships	Athens, Greece	19th (q)	7.87 m
1997	Universiade	Catania, Italy	8th	7.62 m
1998	European Championships	Budapest, Hungary	2nd	8.21 m
1999	World Indoor Championships	Maebashi, Japan	6th	8.15 m
1999	World Championships	Seville, Spain	26th (q)	7.74 m
2000	European Indoor Championships	Ghent, Belgium	2nd	8.20 m
2000	Olympic Games	Sydney, Australia	9th	8.00 m
2001	World Championships	Edmonton, Canada	27th (q)	4.01 m
2003	World Indoor Championships	Birmingham, United Kingdom	–	DQ
2003	World Championships	Paris, France	10th	7.84 m
2004	World Indoor Championships	Budapest, Hungary	4th	8.26 m
2004	Olympic Games	Athens, Greece	7th	8.21 m
2005	European Indoor Championships	Madrid, Spain	2nd	8.14 m
2005	World Championships	Helsinki, Finland	–	NM
