= 2006 European Athletics Championships – Men's long jump =

Men's long jump at the European Athletics Championships

The final of the Men's Long Jump event at the 2006 European Championships in Gothenburg, Sweden was held on Tuesday August 8, 2006. There were a total number of 28 participating athletes. The qualifying rounds were staged a day earlier, on Monday August 7, with the mark set in 7.95 metres.

== Medalists ==
Gold	Andrew Howe; Italy (ITA)
Silver	(United Kingdom) Greg Rutherford; Great Britain (GBR)
Bronze	Olexiy Lukashevych; Ukraine (UKR)

== Schedule ==
- All times are Central European Time (UTC+1)

Qualification Round
Group A	Group B
07.08.2006 – 19:45h	07.08.2006 – 19:45h
Final Round
08.08.2006 – 17:25h

== Abbreviations ==
- All results shown are in metres

Q	automatic qualification
q	qualification by rank
DNS	did not start
NM	no mark
WR	world record
AR	area record
NR	national record
PB	personal best
SB	season best

== Records ==
Standing records prior to the 2006 European Athletics Championships
World Record	Mike Powell (USA)	8.95 m	August 30, 1991	Tokyo, Japan
Event Record	Robert Emmiyan (URS)	8.41 m	August 29, 1986	Stuttgart, West Germany

== Qualification ==
=== Group A ===
Rank	Overall	Athlete	Attempts			Distance	Note
Rank	Overall	Athlete	1	2	3	Distance	Note
1	2	Viktor Kuznyetsov (UKR)	8.25	—	—	8.25 m	
2	3	Louis Tsatoumas (GRE)	8.09	—	—	8.09 m	
3	4	Greg Rutherford (GBR)	8.07	—	—	8.07 m	
4	10	Nelson Évora (POR)	X	7.88	7.93	7.93 m	
5	11	Salim Sdiri (FRA)	7.54	X	7.87	7.87 m	
6	12	Ruslan Gataullin (RUS)	7.80	X	7.85	7.85 m	
7	14	Dmytro Bilotserkivsky (UKR)	X	X	7.83	7.83 m	
8	16	Arturs Abolins (LAT)	7.77	X	7.38	7.77 m	
9	19	Nicola Trentin (ITA)	7.65	7.61	7.66	7.66 m	
10	21	Vytautas Seliukas (LTU)	7.45	7.58	X	7.58 m	
11	22	Admir Bregu (ALB)	X	7.17	7.53	7.53 m	
12	23	Morten Jensen (DEN)	7.34	7.42	X	7.42 m	
13	24	Oliver Koenig (GER)	X	7.36	7.31	7.36 m	
—	—	Danut Simion (ROM)	—	—	—	DNS	

=== Group B ===
Rank	Overall	Athlete	Attempts			Distance	Note
Rank	Overall	Athlete	1	2	3	Distance	Note
1	1	Andrew Howe (ITA)	7.33	8.33	—	8.33 m	
2	5	Olexiy Lukashevych (UKR)	8.06	—	—	8.06 m	
3	6	Asterios Nousios (GRE)	7.97	—	—	7.97 m	SB
4	7	Chris Tomlinson (GBR)	7.79	7.95	—	7.95 m	
5	8	Nathan Morgan (GBR)	7.94	7.93	—	7.94 m	
6	9	Kafétien Gomis (FRA)	7.89	X	7.94	7.94 m	
7	13	Dmitriy Sapinskiy (RUS)	X	X	7.84	7.84 m	
8	14	Joan Lino Martínez (ESP)	7.65	7.83	X	7.83 m	
9	17	Bogdan Tudor (ROM)	7.76	7.76	7.69	7.76 m	
10	18	Marcin Starzak (POL)	X	7.67	7.73	7.73 m	
11	19	Sebastian Bayer (GER)	X	4.17	7.66	7.66 m	
12	25	Nikolay Atanasov (BUL)	7.24	X	X	7.24 m	
13	26	Jan Žumer (SLO)	X	6.01	—	6.01 m	
—	—	Ivan Pucelj (CRO)	X	X	X	NM	

== Final ==
Rank	Athlete	Attempts						Distance	Note
Rank	Athlete	1	2	3	4	5	6	Distance	Note
1st place, gold medalist(s)	Andrew Howe (ITA)	8.12	8.20	8.04	8.19	X	8.13	8.20 m	
2nd place, silver medalist(s)	Greg Rutherford (GBR)	5.34	8.03	—	X	7.78	8.13	8.13 m	
3rd place, bronze medalist(s)	Olexiy Lukashevych (UKR)	7.73	7.77	8.04	X	8.12	X	8.12 m	
4	Viktor Kuznyetsov (UKR)	7.96	7.60	7.52	7.58	—	—	7.96 m	PB
5	Kafétien Gomis (FRA)	7.50	7.91	7.24	X	7.93	X	7.93 m	
6	Nelson Évora (POR)	7.65	7.74	7.74	7.80	7.91	7.90	7.91 m	
7	Ruslan Gataullin (RUS)	7.74	7.74	7.80	X	X	7.91	7.91 m	
8	Louis Tsatoumas (GRE)	X	X	7.84	X	X	X	7.84 m	
9	Chris Tomlinson (GBR)	X	7.61	7.74				7.74 m	
10	Salim Sdiri (FRA)	7.69	X	7.44				7.69 m	
11	Nathan Morgan (GBR)	7.57	X	7.65				7.65 m	
12	Asterios Nousios (GRE)	7.34	X	X				7.34 m	
