= Volodymyr Zyuskov =

Ukrainian long jumper

Volodymyr Viktorovych Zyuskov (Ukrainian: Володимир Вікторович Зюськов; born 29 August 1981) is a male long jumper from Ukraine. His personal best jump is 8.31 metres, achieved in July 2005 in Kyiv.

== Competition record ==
Year	Competition	Venue	Position	Notes
Representing Ukraine
2000	World Junior Championships	Santiago, Chile	2nd	7.84 m (wind: -0.6 m/s)
2001	European U23 Championships	Amsterdam, Netherlands	2nd	7.90 m (wind: -0.2 m/s)
2001	Universiade	Beijing, China	4th	7.92 m
2002	European Indoor Championships	Vienna, Austria	6th	7.97 m
2003	World Indoor Championships	Birmingham, United Kingdom	5th	8.00 m
2003	European U23 Championships	Bydgoszcz, Poland	2nd	8.22 m (wind: 1.7 m/s)
2003	World Championships	Paris, France	6th	8.08 m
2003	World Athletics Final	Monte Carlo, Monaco	6th	7.94 m
2004	World Indoor Championships	Budapest, Hungary	5th	8.23 m
2004	Olympic Games	Athens, Greece	18th (q)	7.88 m
2005	European Indoor Championships	Madrid, Spain	3rd	7.99 m
2005	Universiade	İzmir, Turkey	1st	8.06 m
2005	World Athletics Final	Monte Carlo, Monaco	6th	7.70 m
2007	Universiade	Bangkok, Thailand	5th	7.86 m
