= Nathan Morgan =

English long jumper (born 1978)

Personal information
- Nationality: British (English)
- Born: 30 June 1978 (age 47) Leicester, England

Sport
- Sport: Athletics
- Event: Long jump
- Club: Birchfield Harriers
Medal record
Representing England
Commonwealth Games
Gold medal – first place	2002 Manchester	Long Jump

Nathan Morgan (born 30 June 1978 in ) is former long jumper from England, with a personal best of 8.26 metres and who won the gold medal at the 2002 Commonwealth Games.

== Biography ==
He is the former British record holder, but is currently third on the British all time long jump list, behind Chris Tomlinson and Greg Rutherford.

At the 2002 Commonwealth Games he was the only athlete to jump over eight meters with a jump of 8.02 m. This clinched him a gold medal.

Morgan was twice British long jump champion after winning the British AAA Championships title at the 1998 AAA Championships and the 2001 AAA Championships.

== International competitions ==
Year	Competition	Venue	Position	Notes
Representing Great Britain and England
1996	World Junior Championships	Sydney, Australia	3rd	7.74 m (wind: +1.0 m/s)
1999	European U23 Championships	Gothenburg, Sweden	3rd	7.99 m (wind: +1.8 m/s)
2002	Commonwealth Games	Manchester, England	1st	8.02 m
2006	European Championships	Gothenburg, Sweden	11th	7.65 m
