= Yann Domenech =

French long jumper

Personal information
- Full name: Yann Domenech
- Nationality: France
- Born: 17 March 1979 (age 47) Valréas, France
- Height: 1.73 m (5 ft 8 in)
- Weight: 61 kg (134 lb)

Sport
- Sport: Athletics
- Event: Long jump
- Club: AC Bourg Saint Andéol; Pierrelate
- Coached by: Christian Branchereau

Achievements and titles
- Personal best: Long jump: 8.28 (2004)

Yann Domenech (born March 17, 1979, in Valréas) is a retired French long jumper. Representing his nation France at the 2004 Summer Olympics, Domenech registered his best jump at 8.28 m from the Lyon-Parilly Athletics Meet in Vénissieux two months before the Games. Throughout his career in track and field, Domenech trained for AC Bourg Saint Andéol in Pierrelatte, under his personal coach Christian Branchereau.

Domenech qualified for the French squad in the men's long jump at the 2004 Summer Olympics in Athens by successfully jumping an Olympic A-standard of 8.28 m from the Lyon-Parilly Athletics Meet in Vénissieux. During the prelims, Domenech spanned his opening legal jump at 7.56 m, until he smoothly extended it to 7.73 m on his second attempt. Since his third leap produced a cautious foul, Domenech finished only in twenty-eighth out of forty-one athletes, and did not advance past the qualifying round.
