= Morten Jensen (long jumper) =

Danish long jumper and sprinter

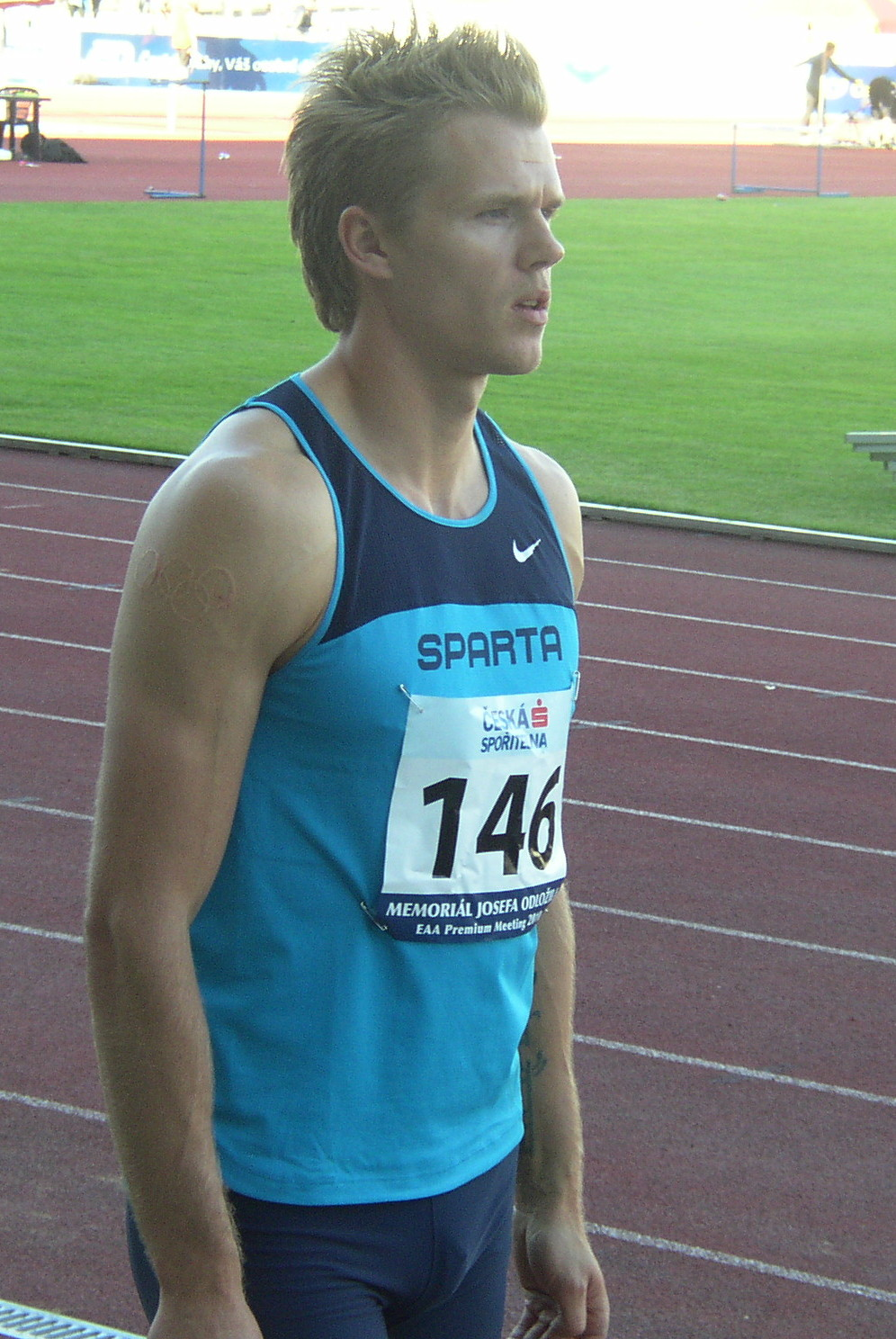
Morten Jensen at the 2010 Josef Odložil Memorial in Prague

Morten Jensen (born 2 December 1982 in Lynge) is a Danish former track and field athlete. He specialised in the long jump and also competed in the 100 metres and 200 metres sprints. He holds the Danish record in the long jump and formerly held the national records in the 100 metres and indoor 200 metres.

He competed at the World Championships in Athletics in 2005 and 2007, the 2006 World Indoor Championships, the 2006 European Championships, the 2007 World Championships, and the 2008 Olympic Games without qualifying for the final round.

He was runner-up in the 2010 Finnish Elite Games rankings, just missing out on Levern Spencer for that year's jackpot.

He has been a part of the Sparta team since 2005, before then he was a part of FIF Hillerød. His coach was Leif Dahlberg after the 2010 European Championships he changed to Lars Nielsen and Anders Møller.

== International competitions ==
- All results regarding long jump, unless stated otherwise

Year	Competition	Venue	Position	Event	Notes
Representing Denmark
2000	World Junior Championships	Santiago, Chile	28th (qf)	100m	10.70 (wind: +0.7 m/s)
2000	World Junior Championships	Santiago, Chile	17th (q)	Long jump	7.25 m (wind: -0.2 m/s)
2003	European U23 Championships	Bydgoszcz, Poland	8th	Long jump	7.81 m (wind: 2.0 m/s)
2006	European Championships	Gothenburg, Sweden	23rd	Long jump	7.42 m
2009	World Championships	Berlin, Germany	29th	Long jump	7.75 m
2011	European Indoor Championships	Paris, France	3rd	Long jump	8.00 m

== Personal bests ==
- 100 metres: 10.29 s (2004) NR
- 200 metres: 20.75 s (2004)
- Long jump: 8.25 m (2005) NR

== See also ==
- List of European Athletics Indoor Championships medalists (men)
- List of 100 metres national champions (men)
- List of 200 metres national champions (men)
