= Chris Tomlinson =

English long jumper

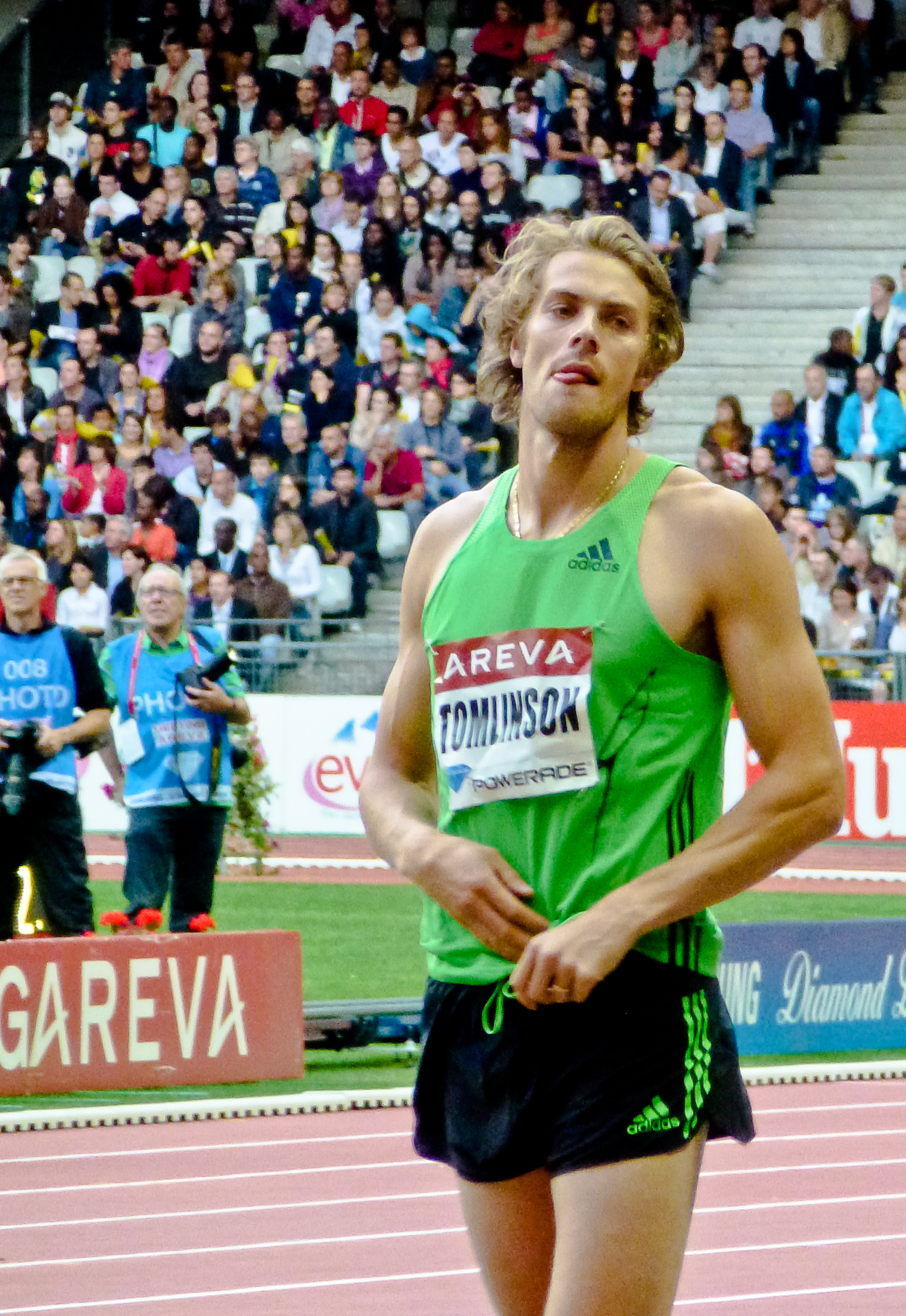

Personal information
- Nationality: British (English)
- Born: 15 September 1981 (age 45) Middlesbrough, England
- Height: 1.97 m (6 ft 5 1/2 in)
- Weight: 84 kg (185 lb)

Sport
- Sport: Athletics
- Event: Long jump
- Club: Newham and Essex Beagles
Medal record
World Indoor Championships
Silver medal – second place	2008 Valencia	Long jump
European Championships
Bronze medal – third place	2010 Barcelona	Long jump
- Updated on 15 August 2012

Christopher George Tomlinson (born 15 September 1981) is a retired English long jumper. He is the former British long jump record holder and competed at the Olympics of 2004, 2008 and 2012.

== Biography ==
Born in Middlesbrough, Tomlinson began competing for Middlesbrough AC (formerly Mandale Harriers) at the age of 10, mostly over 100m and 200m. He attended Nunthorpe Secondary School, where he still holds many of its year group records for triple and long jump, before attending Prior Pursglove College in Guisborough. In his early teens Chris decided to concentrate on long jump. His major breakthrough came in 2002 when, just three months after breaking both wrists in a freak weight-training accident, he jumped 8.27 m to break the British record that had been held by Lynn Davies for 34 years. On 7 July 2007 he increased his record by a further 2 cm, jumping 8.29 metres (27 ft 2.4 in) while competing in Bad Langensalza in Germany.

Tomlinson competed for athletics club Newham and Essex Beagles for some time. He has won seven national titles in various age groups, including one for the triple jump indoors for under 20s in 2000.

In February 2008 he became the world's top long jumper of the year so far with a leap of 8.18m. He won the silver medal at the 2008 World Indoor Championships. He competed at the 2008 Olympic Games without reaching the final. On 20 August 2009, his record was broken by 1 cm by Greg Rutherford in the qualifying for the World Championships long jump final. Both Rutherford and Tomlinson progressed to the final.

Tomlinson regained the British record in July 2011 with a jump of 8.35 m in Paris. Rutherford equalled this distance on 3 May 2012, before surpassing it in 2014.

Tomlinson was a five-times British long jump champion after winning the British AAA Championships title in 2004 and the British Athletics Championships in 2007, 2009, 2010 and 2013.

Tomlinson was conferred with an Honorary doctorate by the University of East London in 2010.

== Achievements ==
Year	Competition	Venue	Position	Notes
Representing Great Britain and England
2000	World Junior Championships	Santiago, Chile	12th	7.29 m (wind: +0.7 m/s)
2001	European U23 Championships	Amsterdam, Netherlands	6th	7.70 m (wind: -0.2 m/s)
2002	Commonwealth Games	Manchester, England	6th	7.79 m
2002	European Championships	Munich, Germany	6th	7.78 m
2003	World Indoor Championships	Birmingham, United Kingdom	11th (q)	7.73 m
2003	World Championships	Paris, France	9th	7.93 m
2004	World Indoor Championships	Budapest, Hungary	6th	8.17 m
2004	Olympic Games	Athens, Greece	5th	8.25 m
2005	European Indoor Championships	Madrid, Spain	9th (q)	7.85 m
2005	World Championships	Helsinki, Finland	14th (q)	7.83 m
2006	Commonwealth Games	Melbourne, Australia	6th	7.96 m
2006	European Championships	Gothenburg, Sweden	9th	7.74 m
2007	European Indoor Championships	Birmingham, United Kingdom	5th	7.89 m
2007	World Championships	Osaka, Japan	16th (q)	7.89 m
2008	World Indoor Championships	Valencia, Spain	2nd	8.06 m
2008	Olympic Games	Beijing, China	27th (q)	7.70 m
2009	World Championships	Berlin, Germany	8th	8.06 m
2010	World Indoor Championships	Doha, Qatar	14th (q)	7.75 m
2010	European Championships	Barcelona, Spain	3rd	8.23 m
2010	Commonwealth Games	New Delhi, India	—	NM
2011	European Team Championships	Stockholm, Sweden	3rd	8.12 m
2011	World Championships	Daegu, South Korea	11th	7.87 m
2012	European Championships	Helsinki, Finland	13th (q)	7.84 m
2012	Olympic Games	London, United Kingdom	6th	8.07 m
2013	European Indoor Championships	Gothenburg, Sweden	7th	7.95 m
2014	Commonwealth Games	Glasgow, United Kingdom	5th	7.99 m
2014	European Championships	Zurich, Switzerland	11th	7.75 m

Note: Results with a q, indicate overall position in qualifying round

== Personal bests ==
Event	Personal Best	Venue	Date
60 metres (indoor)	6.84 seconds	Lee Valley, UK	4 January 2009
100 metres	10.69 seconds	Florida, United States	13 April 2002
200 metres	21.55 seconds	London, UK	8 May 2004
Long Jump	8.35 m	Paris, France	8 July 2011
Long Jump (indoor)	8.18 m	Stuttgart, Germany	2 February 2008
Triple Jump	14.80 m	Sheffield, UK	8 July 2000
Triple Jump (indoor)	15.31 m	Birmingham, UK	5 February 2000

- All information taken from IAAF profile and power of 10 profile.
