= Dimitrios Serelis =

Greek long jumper

Dimitrios Serelis (born 5 May 1980) is a retired Greek athlete who specialised in the long jump. He represented his country at two Olympic Games, in 2000 and 2004, failing to register a valid mark on both occasions.

His personal bests in the event are 8.21 metres outdoor (+1.4 m/s, Athens 2003) and 8.08 metres (Piraeus 2000).

== Competition record ==
Year	Competition	Venue	Position	Event	Notes
Representing Greece
1999	European Junior Championships	Riga, Latvia	14th (q)	Long jump	7.17 m
2000	European Indoor Championships	Ghent, Belgium	16th (q)	Long jump	7.57 m
2000	Olympic Games	Sydney, Australia	–	Long jump	NM
2003	World Championships	Paris, France	23rd (q)	Long jump	7.75 m
2004	World Indoor Championships	Budapest, Hungary	21st (q)	Long jump	7.62 m
2004	Olympic Games	Athens, Greece	–	Long jump	NM
