= Štepán Wagner =

Czech long jumper

Personal information
- Born: October 5, 1981 (age 44)
- Height: 1.87 m (6 ft 2 in)
- Weight: 79 kg (174 lb)

Sport
- Country: Czech Republic
- Sport: Athletics
- Event: Long jump
- Updated on 15 August 2012

Štepán Wagner (born 5 October 1981) is a Czech track and field athlete who specialises in the long jump. He has a personal best of 8.21 metres for the event, and also occasionally competes in sprinting events. He has competed internationally for his country at the World Championships in Athletics in (2009) and is a three-time participant at the Summer Universiade.

Born in the city of Brno, he emerged nationally in 2005 with wins at the Czech indoor and outdoor championships. He cleared eight metres for the first time that year, setting a personal best of 8.11 m in his home city. He also made his international debut for the Czech Republic, competing at the 2005 European Athletics Indoor Championships and placing eighth at the 2005 Summer Universiade. He was third at the 2007 European Cup and reached the Universiade final for a second time.

Wagner twice reached eight metres in 2008, but did not qualify for the 2008 Beijing Olympics. He reached his third student final at the 2009 Universiade and jumps of 8.06 m and 8.15 m led to his selection for the 2009 World Championships in Athletics, where he was eliminated in the qualifying round. He failed to jump over eight metres in the 2010 and 2011 seasons, but represented his country at the 2011 European Athletics Indoor Championships. In 2012, he competed at the European Athletics Championships, getting knocked out in the qualifiers, but a personal best jump of 8.21 m in Brno gained him selection for the Czech Republic at the 2012 Summer Olympics. He did not reach the final.
