= Stefano Dacastello =

Italian long jumper and sprinter

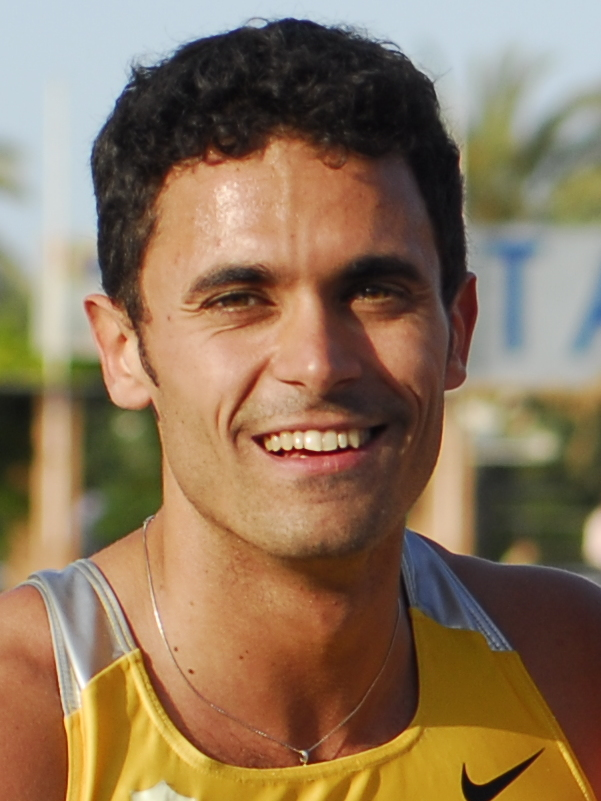
- Dacastello in 2006

Personal information
- Nationality: Italian
- Born: 17 February 1980 (age 46) Bra, Italy
- Height: 1.83 m (6 ft 0 in)
- Weight: 72 kg (159 lb)

Sport
- Country: Italy
- Sport: Athletics
- Event(s): Long jump Sprint
- Club: G.S. Fiamme Gialle

Achievements and titles
- Personal bests: Long jump: 8.17 m (2004); 100 m: 10.41 (2003)
Medal record
Universiade
Bronze medal – third place	2005 Izmir	4x100 metres relay

Stefano Dacastello (born 17 February 1980) is an Italian long jumper and sprinter.

He won one medal at the International athletics competitions.

== Biography ==
He has 9 caps in national team from 2002 to 2006.

== National titles ==
Stefano Dacastello has won 3 times the individual national championship.

- 3 wins in long jump (2004, 2005, 2011)

== See also ==
- Italian all-time lists - Long jump
- Italy national relay team
