= Luka Aračić =

Croatian long jumper (born 1981)

Personal information
- Born: 13 March 1981 (age 44) Zagreb, Croatia

Sport
- Country: Croatia

Luka Aračić (born 13 March 1981) is a Croatian retired long jumper.

Aračić was born in Zagreb. He finished eighth at the 2000 World Junior Championships, and competed at the 2001 World Championships without reaching the final. He also became Croatian long jump champion in 2000 and 2001.

Aračić's personal best jump was 8.12 metres, achieved in June 2001 in Nicosia.
