= Boštjan Fridrih =

Slovenian athlete

Personal information
- Nationality: Slovenian
- Born: 20 September 1979 (age 47) Slovenska Bistrica, Yugoslavia

Sport
- Sport: Sprinting
- Event: 4 × 100 metres relay
Medal record
Representing Slovenia
Mediterranean Games
Bronze medal – third place	2005 Almeria	4x100m relay

Boštjan Fridrih (born 20 September 1979) is a Slovenian sprinter. He competed in the men's 4 × 100 metres relay at the 2000 Summer Olympics.
