= James Beckford (athlete) =

Jamaican athlete (born 1975)

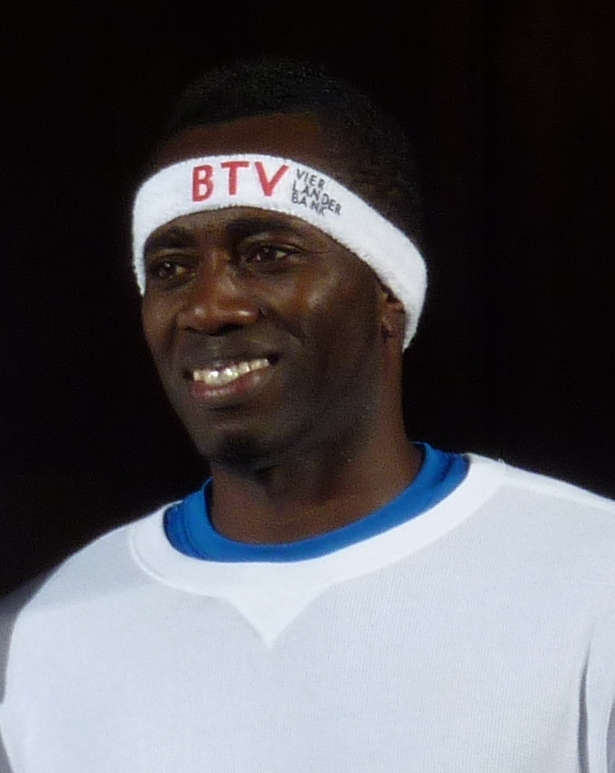
- James Beckford (2012)

Personal information
- Born: 9 January 1975 (age 51) Saint Mary, Jamaica

Sport
- Sport: Track and field
Medal record
Representing Jamaica
Olympic Games
| Silver medal – second place | 1996 Atlanta | Long jump |
World Championships
| Silver medal – second place | 1995 Gothenburg | Long jump |
| Silver medal – second place | 2003 Paris | Long jump |
World Indoor Championships
| Silver medal – second place | 2004 Budapest | Long jump |
Summer Universiade
| Silver medal – second place | 1997 Catania | Long jump |
Central American and Caribbean Games
| Silver medal – second place | 1998 Maracaibo | Long jump |

James Beckford (born 9 January 1975) is a Jamaican track and field athlete competing in the long jump. He represented Jamaica at the Olympic level in 1996, 2000 and 2004. He was the silver medallist in the long jump at the 1996 Olympics and also has two silvers from the World Championships in Athletics (from 1995 and 2003). He was chosen as the Jamaica Sportsman of the Year for 1995, 1996 and 2003. He is the current holder of the Jamaican record for the triple jump with a mark of 17.92 m, and was also the holder of the long jump record at 8.62m until 28 September. 2019 when it was replaced with a mark of 8.69 m by Tajay Gayle at the World Championships in Athletics in Doha, Qatar.

Beckford was educated in the United States and began his athletics career there, specialising in the horizontal jumps. He took the triple jump title at Florida's Class AAAA championship, representing William R. Boone High School. He moved to Texas to study at Blinn College. While there he improved Delroy Poyser's Jamaican record with a jump of 17.29 metres (56 ft 8¾ in) – a mark which was also the world-leading outdoor jump at that point in April 1994.

His personal best of 8.62 m (28 ft 3 1/4 in) is currently ranked 15th on the all-time list. Since he made that jump, 5 April 1997 in Orlando, Florida, only 6 men have jumped farther.

He was banned from competition for three months in 1997 after he failed a drug test for ephedrine, a banned stimulant.

He has competed at the World Championships on five occasions and the IAAF World Indoor Championships on six occasions. Aside from his global performances, he has won medals at the Summer Universiade, the Goodwill Games, the IAAF Grand Prix Final, as well as a silver medal from the 1998 CAC Games.

He remains active, winning the 2018 World Masters Championships.

== Achievements ==
| Year | Competition | Venue | Position | Event | Notes |
|---|---|---|---|---|---|
| 1995 | World Championships | Gothenburg, Sweden | 2nd | Long jump | |
| 1995 | World Championships | Gothenburg, Sweden | 6th | Triple jump | |
| 1995 | Grand Prix Final | Monte Carlo, Monaco | 3rd | Long jump | |
| 1996 | Olympic Games | Atlanta, Georgia, United States | 2nd | Long jump | |
| 1997 | World Indoor Championships | Paris, France | 5th | Long jump | |
| 1997 | World Championships | Athens, Greece | 4th | Long jump | |
| 1997 | Universiade | Catania, Italy | 2nd | Long jump | |
| 1997 | Grand Prix Final | Fukuoka, Japan | 2nd | Long jump | |
| 1998 | Goodwill Games | New York City, United States | 3rd | Long jump | |
| 1998 | CAC Games | Maracaibo, Venezuela | 2nd | Long jump | |
| 1999 | World Indoor Championships | Maebashi, Japan | 5th | Long jump | |
| 2000 | Olympic Games | Sydney, Australia | 14th (qualifiers) | Long jump | |
| 2001 | World Championships | Edmonton, Canada | 7th | Long jump | |
| 2001 | Goodwill Games | Brisbane, Australia | 1st | Long jump | |
| 2001 | Grand Prix Final | Melbourne, Australia | 4th | Long jump | |
| 2003 | World Indoor Championships | Birmingham, England | 6th (qualifiers) | Long jump | |
| 2003 | World Championships | Paris, France | 2nd | Long jump | |
| 2003 | World Athletics Final | Monte Carlo, Monaco | 7th | Long jump | |
| 2004 | World Indoor Championships | Budapest, Hungary | 2nd | Long jump | |
| 2004 | Olympic Games | Athens, Greece | 4th | Long jump | |
| 2004 | World Athletics Final | Monte Carlo, Monaco | 5th | Long jump | |
| 2005 | World Championships | Helsinki, Finland | 9th | Long jump | |
| 2005 | World Athletics Final | Monte Carlo, Monaco | 3rd | Long jump | |
| 2006 | World Indoor Championships | Moscow, Russia | 6th (qualifiers) | Long jump | |
| 2006 | World Athletics Final | Stuttgart, Germany | 7th | Long jump | |
| 2007 | World Championships | Osaka, Japan | 6th | Long jump | |
| 2008 | World Indoor Championships | Valencia, Spain | 6th | Long jump | |

== See also ==
- List of sportspeople sanctioned for doping offences

Sporting positions
| Preceded by (Cuba) Iván Pedroso | Men's Long Jump Best Year Performance; 1998 | Succeeded by (Cuba) Iván Pedroso |
