= 2005 European Athletics Indoor Championships =

- Dates: 4 – 6 March
- Host city: Madrid, Spain
- Venue: Palacio de Deportes
- Events: 28
- Participation: 563 athletes from 41 nations

The 2005 European Athletics Indoor Championships were held at the Palacio de Deportes in Madrid, the capital city of Spain, from Friday, 4 March to Sunday, 6 March 2005. This was the first edition to be held in an odd year since switching to the biennial format, so as not to occur in the same as the outdoor European Athletics Championships and also recently moved IAAF World Indoor Championships. To accommodate this change, there was a two-year gap since the previous edition. It also marked the last time that the 200 metres were contested at the event.

Russia finished on top of the medal table with 17 medals including 9 gold and a clear lead over Sweden and France. The host nation Spain lost only to Russia on the number of medals but won only one gold and finished fifth overall.

== Medal summary ==
=== Men ===
Games	Gold		Silver		Bronze	
60 m	(United Kingdom) Jason Gardener (GBR)	6.55	(France) Ronald Pognon (FRA)	6.62	(Ukraine) Kostyantyn Vasyukov (UKR)	6.62
200 m	(Germany) Tobias Unger (GER)	20.53	(United Kingdom) Chris Lambert (GBR)	20.69	(Poland) Marcin Urbaś (POL)	21.04
400 m	(Republic of Ireland) David Gillick (IRL)	46.30	(Spain) David Canal (ESP)	46.64	(Germany) Sebastian Gatzka (GER)	46.88
800 m	(Russia) Dmitriy Bogdanov (RUS)	1:48.61	(Spain) Antonio Manuel Reina (ESP)	1:48.76	(Spain) Juan de Dios Jurado (ESP)	1:49.11
1500 m	(Ukraine) Ivan Heshko (UKR)	3:36.70 (CR)	(Spain) Juan Carlos Higuero (ESP)	3:37.98	(Spain) Reyes Estévez (ESP)	3:38.90
3000 m	(Republic of Ireland) Alistair Cragg (IRL)	7:46.32	(United Kingdom) John Mayock (GBR)	7:51.46	(Spain) Reyes Estévez (ESP)	7:51.65
60 m hurdles	(France) Ladji Doucouré (FRA)	7.50	(Spain) Felipe Vivancos (ESP)	7.61	(Sweden) Robert Kronberg (SWE)	7.65
4 × 400 m relay	France; Richard Maunier; Remi Wallard; Brice Panel; Marc Raquil	3:07.90	Great Britain; Dale Garland; Daniel Cossins; Richard Davenport; Gareth Warburton	3:09.53	Russia; Andrey Polukeyev; Aleksandr Usov; Dmitriy Forshev; Aleksandr Broshchenko	3:09.63
High jump	(Sweden) Stefan Holm (SWE)	2.40 m (CR)	(Russia) Yaroslav Rybakov (RUS)	2.38 m	(Russia) Pavel Fomenko (RUS)	2.32 m
Pole vault	(Russia) Igor Pavlov (RUS)	5.90 m (CR)	(Ukraine) Denys Yurchenko (UKR)	5.85 m	(Germany) Tim Lobinger (GER)	5.80 m
Long jump	(Spain) Joan Lino Martínez (ESP)	8.37 m	(Romania) Bogdan Tarus (ROU)	8.14 m	(Ukraine) Volodymyr Zyuskov (UKR)	7.99 m
Triple jump	(Russia) Igor Spasovkhodskiy (RUS)	17.20 m	(Ukraine) Mykola Savolainen (UKR)	17.01 m	(Russia) Aleksandr Petrenko (RUS)	16.98 m
Shot put	(Denmark) Joachim Olsen (DEN)	21.19 m	(Netherlands) Rutger Smith (NED)	20.79 m	(Spain) Manuel Martinez (ESP)	20.51 m
Heptathlon	(Czech Republic) Roman Šebrle (CZE)	6232 pts	(Russia) Aleksandr Pogorelov (RUS)	6111 pts	(Austria) Roland Schwarzl (AUT)	6064 pts

- Note: Britain's Mark Lewis-Francis, second in men's 60 m (6.59), was later disqualified for doping offence (tetrahydrocannabinol).

=== Women ===
Games	Gold		Silver		Bronze	
60 m	Kim Gevaert (BEL)	7.16	Yeoryia Kokloni (GRE)	7.18	Maria Karastamati (GRE)	7.25
200 m	Ivet Lalova (BUL)	22.91 (NR)	Karin Mayr-Krifka (AUT)	22.94	Jacqueline Poelman (NED)	23.42
400 m	Svetlana Pospelova (RUS)	50.41	Sviatlana Usovich (BLR)	50.55	Irina Rosikhina (RUS)	52.05
800 m	Larisa Chzhao (RUS)	1:59.97	Mayte Martínez (ESP)	2:00.52	Natalya Tsyganova (RUS)	2:01.62
1500 m	Elena Iagăr (ROM)	4:03.09	Corina Dumbravean (ROM)	4:05.88	Hind Dehiba (FRA)	4:07.20
3000 m	Lidia Chojecka (POL)	8:43.76	Susanne Pumper (AUT)	8:47.74 (*)	Sabrina Mockenhaupt (GER)	8:47.76
60 m hurdles	Susanna Kallur (SWE)	7.80	Jenny Kallur (SWE)	7.99	Kirsten Bolm (GER)	8.00
4 × 400 m	Russia; Tatyana Levina; Yuliya Pechonkina; Irina Rosikhina; Svetlana Pospelova	3:28.00 (CR)	Poland; Anna Pacholak; Monika Bejnar; Marta Chrust-Rożej; Małgorzata Pskit	3:29.37	United Kingdom; Melanie Purkiss; Donna Fraser; Catherine Murphy; Lee McConnell	3:29.81
High jump	Anna Chicherova (RUS)	2.01 m	Ruth Beitia (ESP)	1.99 m	Venelina Veneva (BUL)	1.97 m
Pole vault	Yelena Isinbayeva (RUS)	4.90 m (WR)	Anna Rogowska (POL)	4.75 m	Monika Pyrek (POL)	4.70 m
Long jump	Naide Gomes (POR)	6.70 m	Stiliani Pilatou (GRE)	6.64 m	Adina Anton (ROM); Bianca Kappler (GER)	6.59 m 6.53 (**)
Triple jump	Viktoriya Gurova (RUS)	14.74 m	Magdelín Martínez (ITA)	14.54 m	Carlota Castrejana (ESP)	14.45 m
Shot put	Nadzeya Astapchuk (BLR)	19.37 m	Krystyna Zabawska (POL)	18.96 m	Olga Ryabinkina (RUS)	18.83 m
Pentathlon	Carolina Klüft (SWE)	4948 pts	Kelly Sotherton (GBR)	4733 pts	Natalya Dobrynska (UKR)	4667 pts

- Notes:
  - (*) Turkey's Tezeta Desalegn-Dengersa originally won the 3,000 m silver medal in 8:46.65, but was later disqualified for doping offence (metenolone). This was announced on April 6, 2006.
  - (**) Bianca Kappler was awarded joint bronze medal as final jump was incorrectly measured. The jump was misread, putting her in first place, but she pointed out the mistake and was awarded the medal for fair play.

== Medal table ==
Rank	Nation	Gold	Silver	Bronze	Total
1	Russia (RUS)	9	2	6	17
2	Sweden (SWE)	3	1	1	5
3	France (FRA)	2	1	1	4
4	Ireland (IRL)	2	0	0	2
5	Spain (ESP)	1	6	5	12
6	Great Britain (GBR)	1	4	1	6
7	Poland (POL)	1	3	2	6
8	Ukraine (UKR)	1	2	3	6
9	Romania (ROM)	1	2	1	4
10	Belarus (BLR)	1	1	0	2
11	Germany (GER)	1	0	5	6
12	Bulgaria (BUL)	1	0	1	2
13	Belgium (BEL)	1	0	0	1
13	Czech Republic (CZE)	1	0	0	1
13	Denmark (DEN)	1	0	0	1
13	Portugal (POR)	1	0	0	1
17	Austria (AUT)	0	2	1	3
17	Greece (GRE)	0	2	1	3
19	Netherlands (NED)	0	1	1	2
20	Italy (ITA)	0	1	0	1
Totals (20 entries)		28	28	29	85

== Participating nations ==
- Albania (2)
- Armenia (1)
- Austria (8)
- Belarus (11)
- Belgium (9)
- Bulgaria (8)
- Croatia (6)
- Cyprus (3)
- Czech Republic (16)
- Denmark (5)
- Estonia (10)
- Finland (13)
- France (44)
- Georgia (2)
- Germany (36)
- Great Britain (44)
- Greece (24)
- Hungary (6)
- Iceland (1)
- Ireland (16)
- Israel (2)
- Italy (21)
- Latvia (5)
- Liechtenstein (1)
- Lithuania (3)
- Luxembourg (1)
- Malta (3)
- Moldova (2)
- Netherlands (12)
- Poland (31)
- Portugal (13)
- Romania (18)
- Russia (64)
- Serbia and Montenegro (4)
- Slovakia (6)
- Slovenia (17)
- Spain (46)
- Sweden (20)
- Switzerland (6)
- Turkey (2)
- Ukraine (21)

== See also ==
- 2005 in athletics (track and field)
