= 1992 European Athletics Indoor Championships – Men's long jump =

The men's long jump event at the 1992 European Athletics Indoor Championships was held in Palasport di Genova on 29 February.

== Results ==
Rank	Name	Nationality	#1	#2	#3	#4	#5	#6	Result	Notes
1st place, gold medalist(s)	Dmitriy Bagryanov	Unified Team	7.78	x	7.59	7.75	8.12	x	8.12	
2nd place, silver medalist(s)	Konstantin Krause	Germany	7.81	x	7.80	7.87	x	8.04	8.04	
3rd place, bronze medalist(s)	Jarmo Kärnä	Finland	7.93	7.96	x	x	7.64	7.79	7.96	
4	Giovanni Evangelisti	Italy	7.81	x	7.94	x	x	7.93	7.94	
5	Bogdan Tudor	Romania	x	7.76	7.76	7.80	7.81	7.92	7.92	
6	Emiel Mellaard	Netherlands	7.67	7.72	7.76	7.84	7.89	7.77	7.89	
7	Franck Lestage	France	7.66	7.72	7.77	x	7.74	x	7.77	
8	Mark Forsythe	Great Britain	7.76	x	7.52	x	x	x	7.76	
9	Vitaliy Kirilenko	Unified Team	7.49	7.74	x				7.74	
10	Galin Georgiev	Bulgaria	7.73	7.70	7.69				7.73	
11	Mattias Sunneborn	Sweden	7.70	7.23	7.68				7.70	
12	Konstandinos Koukodimos	Greece	x	7.58	7.70				7.70	
13	Dietmar Haaf	Germany	7.42	7.69	7.67				7.69	
14	Ivo Krsek	Czechoslovakia	7.42	7.66	7.68				7.68	
15	Jesús Oliván	Spain	7.68	7.60	7.57				7.68	
16	Volker Goedicke	Germany	7.51	7.61	7.52				7.61	
17	Ángel Hernández	Spain	7.50	x	7.61				7.61	
18	Catalin Sonel	Romania	7.41	7.53	6.30				7.53	
19	Siniša Ergotić	Croatia	7.44	7.52	7.45				7.52	
20	Milan Gombala	Czechoslovakia	7.36	7.46	7.46				7.46	
21	Tibor Ordina	Hungary	6.98	7.42	7.43				7.43	
22	Spyridon Vasdekis	Greece	7.43	x	x				7.43	
23	Frans Maas	Netherlands							7.36	
24	Mark Malisov	Israel							7.23	
	Serge Hélan	France							NM	
