= 1993 IAAF World Indoor Championships – Men's long jump =

The men's long jump event at the 1993 IAAF World Indoor Championships was held on 13 March.

== Medalists ==
Gold	Silver	Bronze
Iván Pedroso; Cuba	Joe Greene; United States	Jaime Jefferson; Cuba

Note: Daniel Ivanov of Bulgaria had originally won the bronze but he was later disqualified for doping.

== Results ==
=== Qualification ===
Qualification: 7.80 (Q) or at least 12 best performers (q) qualified for the final.

Rank	Group	Name	Nationality	#1	#2	#3	Result	Notes
1	B	Iván Pedroso	Cuba	8.00			8.00	Q
2	A	Frans Maas	Netherlands	x	7.96		7.96	Q
~~3~~	A	Daniel Ivanov	Bulgaria	~~7.74~~	~~7.95~~		~~7.95~~	DQ
3	B	Bogdan Tudor	Romania				7.93	Q
4	A	Ivailo Mladenov	Bulgaria	7.79	x	7.90	7.90	Q
5	B	Zhou Ming	China				7.88	Q
6	B	Ángel Hernández	Spain				7.85	Q
7	A	Joe Greene	United States	7.67	7.56	7.80	7.80	Q
8	A	Emiel Mellaard	Netherlands	x	7.56	7.78	7.78	q
8	B	Nai Hui-fang	Chinese Taipei				7.78	q, NR
10	B	Jaime Jefferson	Cuba				7.77	q
11	A	Spyridon Vasdekis	Greece	7.73	x	x	7.73	q
12	B	Milan Gombala	Czech Republic	7.59	7.56	7.69	7.69	
13	B	Dietmar Haaf	Germany	x	7.67	x	7.67	
14	B	François Fouché	South Africa	x	7.43	7.64	7.64	
15	B	Stanislav Tarasenko	Russia	x	7.58	7.62	7.62	
16	A	Ian James	Canada	7.57	7.61	x	7.61	
17	B	Mattias Sunneborn	Sweden	x	5.79	7.61	7.61	
18	B	Christian Thomas	Germany	x	x	7.57	7.57	
19	B	Xu Bin	China	7.53	7.10	x	7.53	
20	A	Gordon McKee	United States	x	x	7.46	7.46	
21	A	Tibor Ordina	Hungary	7.34	x	x	7.34	
	A	Fred Salle	Great Britain	x	x	x	NM	
	A	Robert Emmiyan	Armenia				DNS	
	A	Obinna Eregbu	Nigeria				DNS	
	A	Franck Zio	Burkina Faso				DNS	
	A	Mark Mason	Guyana				DNS	
	B	Armen Martirosyan	Armenia				DNS	

=== Final ===
Rank	Name	Nationality	#1	#2	#3	#4	#5	#6	Result	Notes
1st place, gold medalist(s)	Iván Pedroso	Cuba	7.25	7.94	7.43	8.18	8.23	x	8.23	NR
2nd place, silver medalist(s)	Joe Greene	United States	7.42	8.13	8.00	x	x	8.07	8.13	
3rd place, bronze medalist(s)	Jaime Jefferson	Cuba	7.85	x	x	x	7.65	7.98	7.98	
4	Frans Maas	Netherlands	7.69	x	7.96	x	x	x	7.96	
5	Bogdan Tudor	Romania	x	7.78	7.91	7.89	x	x	7.91	
6	Ivailo Mladenov	Bulgaria	6.05	7.86	7.78	x	x	x	7.86	
7	Zhou Ming	China	7.66	7.75	7.84	7.80	7.53	x	7.84	
8	Nai Hui-fang	Chinese Taipei	x	x	7.70				7.70	
9	Ángel Hernández	Spain	x	x	7.66				7.66	
10	Emiel Mellaard	Netherlands	x	x	6.77				6.77	
~~3~~	Daniel Ivanov	Bulgaria	~~7.98~~	~~7.87~~	~~x~~	~~x~~	~~x~~	~~7.92~~	~~7.98~~	DQ
	Spyridon Vasdekis	Greece							DNS	
