= 1991 IAAF World Indoor Championships – Men's long jump =

The men's long jump event at the 1991 IAAF World Indoor Championships was held on 8 and 9 March.

== Medalists ==
Gold	Silver	Bronze
Dietmar Haaf; Germany	Jaime Jefferson; Cuba	Giovanni Evangelisti; Italy

== Results ==
=== Qualification ===
Qualification: 7.80 (Q) or at least 12 best performers (q) qualified for the final.

Rank	Group	Name	Nationality	Result	Notes
1	B	Jaime Jefferson	Cuba	8.10	Q
1	B	Dietmar Haaf	Germany	8.10	Q
3	B	Bogdan Tudor	Romania	7.95	Q
4	A	Giovanni Evangelisti	Italy	7.93	Q
5	B	Konstandinos Koukodimos	Greece	7.92	Q
6	A	Dmitriy Bagryanov	Soviet Union	7.90	Q
7	A	Barrington Williams	Great Britain	7.87	Q
8	B	Vladimir Ochkan	Soviet Union	7.84	Q
9	B	Robert Změlík	Czechoslovakia	7.83	Q
10	A	André Müller	Germany	7.76	q
11	A	Ángel Hernández	Spain	7.75	q
11	A	Keith Talley	United States	7.75	q
13	A	Juan Felipe Ortiz	Cuba	7.74	
14	A	Csaba Almási	Hungary	7.71	
15	B	Jesús Oliván	Spain	7.69	
16	B	Llewellyn Starks	United States	7.65	
17	B	Chen Zunrong	China	7.57	
17	A	Huang Geng	China	7.57	
19	A	Dimitrios Hatzopoulos	Greece	7.56	
20	B	Ayodele Aladefa	Nigeria	7.47	
21	A	Frans Maas	Netherlands	7.45	
22	B	Fred Salle	Cameroon	7.12	
23	A	Sizwe Mdluli	Swaziland	7.07	NR
24	A	Ricardo Valiente	Peru	6.83	NR
	B	Ian James	Canada	NM	
	A	Elmer Williams	Puerto Rico	DNS	
	B	Lai Cheng-chuan	Chinese Taipei	DNS	
	B	António Santos	Angola	DNS	

=== Final ===
Rank	Name	Nationality	#1	#2	#3	#4	#5	#6	Result	Notes
1st place, gold medalist(s)	Dietmar Haaf	Germany	8.02	8.03	7.78	8.15	8.15	x	8.15	
2nd place, silver medalist(s)	Jaime Jefferson	Cuba	8.02	7.87	7.99	8.00	7.99	8.04	8.04	
3rd place, bronze medalist(s)	Giovanni Evangelisti	Italy	x	7.86	7.93	x	7.80	7.48	7.93	
4	Konstandinos Koukodimos	Greece	7.92	7.71	7.92	7.91	x	7.83	7.92	
5	Bogdan Tudor	Romania	x	7.82	7.82	7.88	7.71	x	7.88	
6	Robert Změlík	Czechoslovakia	x	7.83	x	x	x	x	7.83	
7	Dmitriy Bagryanov	Soviet Union	7.80	7.82	7.69	7.64	x	x	7.82	
8	André Müller	Germany	7.68	7.65	7.74	7.75	x	7.49	7.75	
9	Keith Talley	United States	7.73	7.43	7.72				7.73	
10	Ángel Hernández	Spain	7.70	x	x				7.70	
11	Barrington Williams	Great Britain	x	7.65	7.67				7.67	
	Vladimir Ochkan	Soviet Union	x	x	x				NM	
