= 1990 European Athletics Indoor Championships – Men's long jump =

The men's long jump event at the 1990 European Athletics Indoor Championships was held in Kelvin Hall on 3 March.

== Results ==
Rank	Name	Nationality	#1	#2	#3	#4	#5	#6	Result	Notes
1st place, gold medalist(s)	Dietmar Haaf	West Germany	7.86	7.72	x	8.03	–	8.11	8.11	
2nd place, silver medalist(s)	Emiel Mellaard	Netherlands	7.65	7.95	7.68	7.95	7.93	8.08	8.08	
3rd place, bronze medalist(s)	Robert Emmiyan	Soviet Union	7.52	7.83	8.00	7.95	x	8.06	8.06	
4	Christian Thomas	West Germany							7.88	
5	Karsten Embach	East Germany							7.83	
6	Jarmo Kärnä	Finland	7.83	7.77	7.78	7.56	7.44		7.83	
7	Giovanni Evangelisti	Italy							7.79	
8	Stewart Faulkner	Great Britain							7.77	
9	Robert Změlík	Czechoslovakia							7.76	
10	Ángel Hernández	Spain							7.76	
11	Antonio Corgos	Spain							7.70	
12	Frans Maas	Netherlands							7.65	
13	Milan Gombala	Czechoslovakia							7.63	
14	Giuseppe Bertozzi	Italy							7.60	
15	László Szálma	Hungary							7.56	
16	Teddy Steinmayr	Austria							7.52	
17	Spiridon Vasdekis	Greece							7.50	
18	Paul Johnson	Great Britain							7.46	
19	Borut Bilač	Yugoslavia							7.42	
20	Konstadinos Koukodimos	Greece							7.33	
21	Daniel Ivanov	Bulgaria							7.30	
22	Ralf Jaros	West Germany							7.16	
23	Erim May	Turkey							6.94	
