= 1994 European Athletics Indoor Championships – Men's long jump =

The men's long jump event at the 1994 European Athletics Indoor Championships was held in Palais Omnisports de Paris-Bercy on 12 and 13 March.

== Medalists ==
Gold	Silver	Bronze
Dietmar Haaf; Germany	Konstandinos Koukodimos; Greece	Bogdan Tudor; Romania

== Results ==
=== Qualification ===
Qualification performance: 7.75 (Q) or at least 12 best performers (q) advanced to the final.

Rank	Athlete	Nationality	#1	#2	#3	Result	Notes
1	Ivaylo Mladenov	Bulgaria	7.67	8.09		8.09	Q
2	Konstandinos Koukodimos	Greece	8.00			8.00	Q
3	Mattias Sunneborn	Sweden	x	7.94		7.94	Q
4	Roman Orlík	Czech Republic	x	x	7.91	7.91	Q
5	Giovanni Evangelisti	Italy	x	7.86		7.86	Q
6	Dietmar Haaf	Germany	7.63	7.84		7.84	Q
7	Tibor Ordina	Hungary	7.54	7.57	7.83	7.83	Q
8	Stanislav Tarasenko	Russia	7.82			7.82	Q
9	Bogdan Tudor	Romania	7.28	7.81		7.81	Q
10	Robert Emmiyan	Armenia	7.78			7.78	Q
11	Dmitriy Bagryanov	Russia	7.57	7.76		7.76	Q
12	Erik Nijs	Belgium	7.45	7.76		7.76	Q
13	Frans Maas	Netherlands	7.60	7.74	7.75	7.75	Q
14	Georg Ackermann	Germany	7.42	7.62	7.75	7.75	Q
15	Daniel Bărbulescu	Romania	5.93	7.58	7.75	7.75	Q
16	Marco Delonge	Germany	7.73	7.70	7.62	7.73	
17	Aleksandr Glavatskiy	Belarus	7.67	7.72	7.53	7.72	
18	Serge Hélan	France	7.60	7.66	7.72	7.72	
19	Jesús Oliván	Spain	x	7.52	7.72	7.72	
20	Olivier Borderan	France	x	x	7.72	7.72	
21	Vitaliy Kirilenko	Ukraine	7.44	7.65	7.48	7.65	
22	Milan Gombala	Czech Republic	x	x	7.65	7.65	
22	Ángel Hernández	Spain	x	7.65	x	7.65	
24	Róbert Michalík	Czech Republic	7.63	7.52	x	7.63	
25	Mark Malisov	Israel	7.57	7.08	x	7.57	
26	György Makó	Hungary	7.53	7.48	7.40	7.53	
27	Spyridon Vasdekis	Greece	6.99	7.38	7.50	7.50	
28	Armen Martirosyan	Armenia	7.47	x	x	7.47	
29	Alexandr Gliznutsa	Moldova	7.44	x	x	7.44	
	Mika Kahma	Finland	x	x	x	NM	

=== Final ===
Rank	Name	Nationality	#1	#2	#3	#4	#5	#6	Result	Notes
1st place, gold medalist(s)	Dietmar Haaf	Germany	7.95	8.03	7.95	8.15	8.04	x	8.15	
2nd place, silver medalist(s)	Konstandinos Koukodimos	Greece	8.04	7.85	8.06	8.09	x	x	8.09	NR
3rd place, bronze medalist(s)	Bogdan Tudor	Romania	7.90	7.99	8.07	8.01	8.01	x	8.07	
4	Ivaylo Mladenov	Bulgaria	7.91	8.00	8.07	x	x	–	8.07	
5	Stanislav Tarasenko	Russia	7.80	7.82	7.63	7.91	8.00	8.02	8.02	
6	Dmitriy Bagryanov	Russia	8.01	x	x	7.58	x	7.76	8.01	
7	Mattias Sunneborn	Sweden	7.68	7.92	7.72	7.70	7.96	x	7.96	
8	Georg Ackermann	Germany	7.84	7.72	x	x	x	7.71	7.84	
9	Giovanni Evangelisti	Italy	x	7.81	x				7.81	
10	Roman Orlík	Czech Republic	x	7.52	7.75				7.75	
11	Tibor Ordina	Hungary	x	7.66	x				7.66	
12	Daniel Bărbulescu	Romania	x	x	7.51				7.51	
13	Erik Nijs	Belgium	7.47	x	5.36				7.47	
14	Frans Maas	Netherlands	x	x	7.46				7.46	
15	Robert Emmiyan	Armenia	x	7.31	7.38				7.38	
