= 1995 IAAF World Indoor Championships – Men's long jump =

The men's long jump event at the 1995 IAAF World Indoor Championships was held on 10–11 March.

== Medalists ==
Gold	Silver	Bronze
Iván Pedroso; Cuba	Mattias Sunneborn; Sweden	Erick Walder; United States

== Results ==
=== Qualification ===
Qualification: 7.85 (Q) or at least 12 best performers (q) qualified for the final.

Rank	Group	Name	Nationality	#1	#2	#3	Result	Notes
1	B	Iván Pedroso	Cuba	8.12			8.12	Q
2	B	Erick Walder	United States	8.03			8.03	Q
3	B	Mattias Sunneborn	Sweden	7.64	7.91		7.91	Q
4	B	Milan Gombala	Czech Republic	7.90			7.90	Q
5	B	Bogdan Tudor	Romania	7.61	7.89		7.89	Q
6	B	Cheikh Touré	Senegal	7.60	7.86		7.86	Q
7	B	Robert Emmiyan	Armenia	7.69	7.77	7.84	7.84	q
8	B	Erik Nijs	Belgium	7.75	7.74	7.84	7.84	q
9	B	Joe Greene	United States	7.84	7.67	–	7.84	q
10	A	Spyridon Vasdekis	Greece	x	7.84	x	7.84	q
11	B	Huang Geng	China	7.71	7.75	7.82	7.82	q
12	A	Galin Georgiev	Bulgaria	7.71	7.72	7.79	7.79	q
13	B	Konstantin Sarnatskiy	Uzbekistan	7.56	7.79	6.05	7.79	q
14	B	Konstadinos Koukodimos	Greece	7.75	x	x	7.75	
15	A	Frans Maas	Netherlands	x	7.70	7.65	7.70	
16	B	Yevgeniy Tretyak	Russia	7.69	7.55	7.34	7.69	
17	A	Fred Salle	Great Britain	7.69	7.47	x	7.69	
18	A	Konstantin Krause	Germany	7.69	x	x	7.69	
19	A	Gregor Cankar	Slovenia	x	7.31	7.65	7.65	
20	A	Vladimir Malyavin	Turkmenistan	x	7.51	7.63	7.63	
21	B	Ivaylo Mladenov	Bulgaria	7.62	7.37	7.45	7.62	
22	B	Ángel Hernández	Spain	x	7.60	x	7.60	
23	A	Ahmed Al-Moamari	Oman	6.94	7.51	7.29	7.51	
24	A	Chao Chih-Kuo	Chinese Taipei	7.46	x	7.34	7.46	
25	A	Viktor Popko	Ukraine	6.93	7.16	7.38	7.38	
26	A	Robert Michalík	Czech Republic	7.02	6.96	7.36	7.36	
27	A	Shirak Pogosyan	Armenia	7.28	7.19	7.34	7.34	
28	A	Jón Arnar Magnússon	Iceland	7.32	x	x	7.32	
29	A	Lamin Drammeh	Gambia	6.38	6.43	6.28	6.43	
30	A	Biliaminou Alao	Benin	6.32	x	x	6.32	
	A	Ellsworth Manuel	Netherlands Antilles	x	x	x	NM	
	A	Andreja Marinković	Yugoslavia	x	x	x	NM	
	B	Yuriy Naumkin	Russia	x	x	x	NM	

=== Final ===
Rank	Name	Nationality	#1	#2	#3	#4	#5	#6	Results	Notes
1st place, gold medalist(s)	Iván Pedroso	Cuba	7.97	8.00	8.51	x	x	8.15	8.51	CR
2nd place, silver medalist(s)	Mattias Sunneborn	Sweden	8.00	x	8.06	x	8.20	8.15	8.20	NR
3rd place, bronze medalist(s)	Erick Walder	United States	7.95	8.05	7.95	8.02	8.00	8.14	8.14	
4	Joe Greene	United States	7.96	x	8.00	8.06	x	8.12	8.12	
5	Bogdan Tudor	Romania	7.61	8.01	8.00	8.08	7.99	8.11	8.11	
6	Milan Gombala	Czech Republic	x	7.70	7.88	7.95	x	x	7.95	
7	Erik Nijs	Belgium	7.88	7.80	7.70	7.72	7.57	x	7.88	
8	Huang Geng	China	7.83	7.59	x	7.80	7.77	7.78	7.83	
9	Galin Georgiev	Bulgaria	7.62	7.81	x				7.81	
10	Robert Emmiyan	Armenia	7.67	7.74	x				7.74	
11	Konstantin Sarnatskiy	Uzbekistan	7.42	7.67	x				7.67	
	Cheikh Touré	Senegal	x	x	x				NM	
	Spyridon Vasdekis	Greece	x	x	x				NM	
