= 1996 European Athletics Indoor Championships – Men's long jump =

The men's long jump event at the 1996 European Athletics Indoor Championships was held in Stockholm Globe Arena on 8 March.

== Medalists ==
Gold	Silver	Bronze
Mattias Sunneborn; Sweden	Bogdan Țăruș; Romania	Spyridon Vasdekis; Greece

== Results ==
=== Qualification ===
Qualification performance: 7.85 (Q) or at least 12 best performers (q) advanced to the final.

Rank	Athlete	Nationality	#1	#2	#3	Result	Notes
1	Yuriy Naumkin	Russia	7.24	7.97		7.97	Q
2	Aleksandr Glavatskiy	Belarus	7.66	7.70	7.96	7.96	Q
3	Kirill Sosunov	Russia	7.96			7.96	Q
3	Spyridon Vasdekis	Greece	7.96			7.96	Q
5	Mattias Sunneborn	Sweden	7.94			7.94	Q
6	Bogdan Tudor	Romania	7.81	7.82	7.93	7.93	Q
7	Milan Gombala	Czech Republic	x	7.89		7.89	Q
8	Bruno Frinolli	Italy	7.72	7.75	7.88	7.88	Q
9	Bogdan Țăruș	Romania	7.85			7.85	Q
9	Gregor Cankar	Slovenia	7.85			7.85	Q
11	Galin Georgiev	Bulgaria	7.81	7.84	–	7.84	q
12	Ivaylo Mladenov	Bulgaria	x	7.83	–	7.83	q
13	Emmanuel Bangué	France	7.82	x	x	7.82	
14	Konstadinos Koukodimos	Greece	7.62	7.77	7.75	7.77	
15	Erik Nys	Belgium	7.77	7.71	x	7.77	
16	Romuald Ducros	France	x	7.66	7.74	7.74	
17	Dariusz Bontruk	Poland	7.71	x	x	7.71	
18	Ciaran McDonagh	Ireland	x	7.59	7.58	7.59	
19	Simon Schranz	Switzerland	6.66	7.44	7.55	7.55	
20	Alexandr Gliznutsa	Moldova	7.30	7.16	7.52	7.52	
21	Georgios Zampetakis	Greece	7.25	7.21	7.52	7.52	
22	Peter Oldin	Sweden	x	7.50	7.52	7.51	
23	Jesús Oliván	Spain	7.49	x	7.51	7.51	
24	Ranko Leskovar	Slovenia	7.08	x	7.35	7.35	
25	Carlos Calado	Portugal	5.78	7.26	7.20	7.26	
26	Toni Damceski	Macedonia	6.74	6.65	6.71	6.74	
27	Andris Strikis	Latvia	6.40	–	–	6.40	
	Robert Emmiyan	Armenia	x	x	x	NM	
	Justin Nkoumazok	France	x	x	x	NM	
	Jonathan Kron	Ireland	x	x	x	NM	

=== Final ===
Rank	Name	Nationality	#1	#2	#3	#4	#5	#6	Result	Notes
1st place, gold medalist(s)	Mattias Sunneborn	Sweden	7.95	7.84	7.90	8.06	–	x	8.06	
2nd place, silver medalist(s)	Bogdan Țăruș	Romania	x	x	7.91	7.94	7.97	8.03	8.03	
3rd place, bronze medalist(s)	Spyridon Vasdekis	Greece	7.85	8.03	7.93	x	x	7.93	8.03	
4	Gregor Cankar	Slovenia	x	x	7.91	8.01	x	8.01	8.01	
5	Aleksandr Glavatskiy	Belarus	x	7.91	7.97	7.87	x	7.86	7.97	
6	Bogdan Tudor	Romania	7.87	7.83	7.80	7.83	7.86	7.88	7.88	
7	Kirill Sosunov	Russia	x	x	7.80	7.87	7.73	x	7.87	
8	Yuriy Naumkin	Russia	7.85	x	x	x	x	7.75	7.85	
9	Galin Georgiev	Bulgaria	x	7.64	x				7.64	
10	Bruno Frinolli	Italy	x	x	7.63				7.63	
	Milan Gombala	Czech Republic	x	x	x				NM	
	Ivaylo Mladenov	Bulgaria							DNS	
