= 1995 World Championships in Athletics – Men's long jump =

These are the official results of the Men's Long Jump event at the 1995 IAAF World Championships in Gothenburg, Sweden. There were a total number of 50 participating athletes, with two qualifying groups. The final was held on Saturday, August 12, 1995. The qualification mark was set at 8.05 metres.

== Medalists ==
Gold	Iván Pedroso; Cuba (CUB)
Silver	James Beckford; Jamaica (JAM)
Bronze	Mike Powell; United States (USA)

== Schedule ==
- All times are Central European Time (UTC+1)

Qualification Round
Group A	Group B
11.08.1995 – 18:05h	11.08.1995 – 18:05h
Final Round
12.08.1995 – 17:40h

== Abbreviations ==
- All results shown are in metres

Q	automatic qualification
q	qualification by rank
DNS	did not start
NM	no mark
WR	world record
AR	area record
NR	national record
PB	personal best
SB	season best

== Records ==
Standing records prior to the 1995 World Athletics Championships
World Record	Mike Powell (USA)	8.95 m	August 30, 1991	Tokyo, Japan
Event Record	Mike Powell (USA)	8.95 m	August 30, 1991	Tokyo, Japan

== Qualifying round ==
RANK	GROUP A	DISTANCE
1.	Mike Powell (USA)	8.25 m
2.	Ivaylo Mladenov (BUL)	8.16 m
3.	Georg Ackermann (GER)	8.13 m
4.	Bogdan Tudor (ROM)	8.06 m
5.	Geng Huang (CHN)	7.98 m
6.	Galin Georgiev (BUL)	7.93 m
7.	Vitaliy Kyrylenko (UKR)	7.87 m
8.	Nelson Ferreira (BRA)	7.87 m
9.	Sinisa Ergotic (CRO)	7.85 m
10.	Jaime Jefferson (CUB)	7.84 m
11.	Mattias Sunneborn (SWE)	7.67 m
12.	Roberto Coltri (ITA)	7.65 m
13.	Konstantin Sarnatskiy (UZB)	7.52 m
14.	Elmer Williams (PUR)	7.37 m
15.	Biliaminou Alao (BEN)	7.35 m (NR)
16.	Stanislav Tarasenko (RUS)	7.29 m
17.	Ellsworth Manuel (AHO)	2.38 m
—	Andreja Marinković (YUG)	NM
—	Roland McGhee (USA)	NM
—	Roman Orlik (CZE)	NM
—	Musabbah Ali Saeed (UAE)	NM
—	Spyridon Vasdekis (GRE)	NM
—	Kirill Sosunov (RUS)	NM
—	Armen Martirosyan (ARM)	NM
—	Fred Salle (GBR)	NM

RANK	GROUP B	DISTANCE
1.	Iván Pedroso (CUB)	8.45m
2.	James Beckford (JAM)	8.24m
3.	Nobuharu Asahara (JPN)	8.08 m
4.	Andrey Ignatov (RUS)	8.04 m
5.	Franck Zio (BUR)	7.92 m
6.	Robert Emmiyan (ARM)	7.91 m
7.	Konstandinos Koukodimos (GRE)	7.91 m
7.	Kareem Streete-Thompson (USA)	7.91 m
9.	Milan Gombala (CZE)	7.88 m
10.	Cheikh Tidiane Toure (SEN)	7.85 m
10.	Andrew Owusu (GHA)	7.85 m
12.	Aleksandr Glavatskiy (BLR)	7.81 m
13.	Bogdan Tarus (ROM)	7.79 m
14.	Konstantin Krause (GER)	7.68 m
15.	Douglas de Souza (BRA)	7.63 m
16.	Vladimir Malyavin (TKM)	7.38 m
17.	Nikolay Antonov (BUL)	7.36 m
18.	Ricardo Valiente (PER)	7.31 m
19.	Baoting Huang (CHN)	7.29 m
20.	Modou Gai Pa (GAM)	2.17 m
—	Gregor Cankar (SLO)	NM
—	Chih-Kuo Chao (TPE)	NM
—	Rogelio Sainz (MEX)	NM
—	Keita Cline (IVB)	NM
—	Obinna Eregbu (NGR)	DNS

== Final ==
Rank	Athlete	Attempts						Distance	Note
Rank	Athlete	1	2	3	4	5	6	Distance	Note
1st place, gold medalist(s)	Iván Pedroso (CUB)	7.82	8.70	x	x	8.28	8.23	8.70 m	
2nd place, silver medalist(s)	James Beckford (JAM)	7.86	x	8.02	x	8.12	8.30	8.30 m	
3rd place, bronze medalist(s)	Mike Powell (USA)	8.18	x	8.29	8.18	x	x	8.29 m	
4	Georg Ackermann (GER)	7.91	7.95	x	8.14	x		8.14 m	
5	Bogdan Tudor (ROM)							8.01 m	
6	Konstandinos Koukodimos (GRE)	x	8.00	x	x			8.00 m	
7	Huang Geng (CHN)							7.94 m	
8	Ivaylo Mladenov (BUL)							7.93 m	
9	Andrey Ignatov (RUS)	x	7.93					7.93 m	
10	Franck Zio (BUR)							7.87 m	
11	Robert Emmiyan (ARM)							7.77 m	
12	Nobuharu Asahara (JPN)							7.77 m	
13	Galin Georgiev (BUL)							7.72 m	
14	Kareem Streete-Thompson (USA)	x	x	7.43				7.43 m	

== See also ==
- 1994 Men's European Championships Long Jump
- 1996 Men's Olympic Long Jump
- 1998 Men's European Championships Long Jump
