= 1991 World Championships in Athletics – Men's long jump =

Video on YouTube Official video

These are the official results of the Men's Long Jump event at the 1991 IAAF World Championships in Tokyo, Japan. There were a total number of 43 participating athletes, with two qualifying groups and the final held on Friday August 30, 1991. The winning margin was 4 cm (1.57 in).

== Medalists ==
Gold	Mike Powell; United States (USA)
Silver	Carl Lewis; United States (USA)
Bronze	Larry Myricks; United States (USA)

== Analysis ==
This was perhaps the greatest long jump competition ever, as both of the top two athletes achieved distances beyond the then world record which had stood for almost 23 years (though one was over the wind-legal limit of 2.0 m/s). Both made the best wind-legal jumps of their careers in this competition; the still best and still third best wind-legal jumps in history; and the best two long jumps not aided by altitude.

Carl Lewis' record at the time was: two-time Olympic gold medalist, two-time world champion (in the era when it was also still a once-every-four-year event) and, having been undefeated in ten years, he was deservedly considered the best long jumper in the world. Lewis had set the world record in the 100 metres sprint five days earlier. Lewis was in the lead through four rounds: his first round jump of 8.68 m (28 ft 5.73 in) set a new championship record, then his third round jump set his then personal record, albeit wind assisted at 8.83 m (28 ft 11.64 in).

Mike Powell's fourth round jump looked like it was in the range of Lewis, but was ruled a foul. The closeness of the call upset Powell: he went down to his knees at the board trying to see the microscopic indentation into the plasticine indicating it was a foul. Lewis' fourth round jump was wind-aided, but, at 8.91 m (29 ft 2.79 in) it was the longest ever competition long jump in history, beating the existing wind-legal world record set by Bob Beamon at altitude at the 1968 Summer Olympics. Powell's wind-legal fifth round jump topped both, setting the world record at 8.95 m (29 ft 4.36 in). But the competition was not over. Moments later, Lewis answered with his lifetime wind-legal personal record of 8.87 m (29 ft 1.21 in) (into a slight head-wind: -0.2 m/s). Both athletes still had one jump remaining. Powell fouled, and Lewis made his second best wind-legal jump of 8.84 m (29 ft 0.03 in).

Thus the competition included three of the five best wind-legal long-jumps ever; two of them by Carl Lewis, plus a wind-aided jump by Lewis beyond the then world record (a record he had been chasing for ten years), yet Lewis still finished in second place. Since this competition, no athlete, including Powell and Lewis, has 'legally' jumped within 20 cm (7.87 in) of Powell's world record (though some had in the previous decade or so).

== Coverage ==
This momentous event achieved another unique occurrence. It was the only time American network television, in this case NBC, devoted over 20 minutes to a single field event competition. See the video in four parts, primarily narrated by Dwight Stones: Part 1 the introduction, Part 2, Part 3, Part 4.

== Schedule ==
- All times are Japan Standard Time (UTC+9)

Qualification Round
Group A	Group B
29.08.1991 – 16:10h	29.08.1991 – 15:10h
Final Round
30.08.1991 – 17:30h

== Records ==
Prior to this competition, the existing world and Championship records were as follows.

World Record	Bob Beamon (USA)	8.90	Mexico City, Mexico	18 October 1968
Championship Record	Carl Lewis (USA)	8.67	Rome, Italy	5 September 1987

== Qualifying round ==
- Held on Thursday 1991-08-29

RANK	GROUP A	DISTANCE
1.	Carl Lewis (USA)	8.56 m
2.	Chen Zunrong (CHN)	8.05 m
3.	André Müller (GER)	8.04 m
4.	Jaime Jefferson (CUB)	8.04 m
5.	Giovanni Evangelisti (ITA)	8.03 m
6.	George Ogbeide (NGR)	8.02 m
7.	Vladimir Ochkan (URS)	8.01 m
8.	Dave Culbert (AUS)	8.01 m
9.	Edrick Floreal (CAN)	7.95 m
10.	Mark Forsythe (GBR)	7.95 m
11.	Jesús Oliván (ESP)	7.94 m
12.	Milan Gombala (TCH)	7.89 m
13.	James Sabulei (KEN)	7.86 m
14.	Paulo de Oliveira (BRA)	7.78 m
15.	Badara Mbengue (SEN)	7.75 m
16.	Ivan Stoyanov (BUL)	7.73 m
17.	Frans Maas (NED)	7.71 m
18.	Lotfi Khaida (ALG)	7.68 m
19.	Jonathan Moyle (NZL)	7.52 m
20.	François Reteno (GAB)	7.15 m
21.	Khalid Ahmed Mousa (SUD)	6.58 m
—	Hitoshi Shimo (JPN)	NM

RANK	GROUP B	DISTANCE
1.	Dietmar Haaf (GER)	8.21 m
2.	Larry Myricks (USA)	8.20 m
3.	Mike Powell (USA)	8.19 m
4.	Konstandinos Koukodimos (GRE)	8.12 m
5.	Bogdan Tudor (ROM)	8.05 m
6.	Robert Emmiyan (URS)	8.00 m
7.	Ian James (CAN)	7.94 m
8.	Fausto Frigerio (ITA)	7.88 m
9.	Jarmo Kärnä (FIN)	7.79 m
10.	Ángel Hernández (ESP)	7.75 m
11.	Huang Geng (CHN)	7.69 m
12.	Krasimir Minchev (BUL)	7.62 m
13.	Csaba Almási (HUN)	7.62 m
14.	Mattias Sunneborn (SWE)	7.61 m
15.	Murat Ayaydin (TUR)	7.57 m
16.	Franck Zio (BUR)	7.50 m
17.	Saeed Musabbah Ali (UAE)	7.05 m
18.	Kareem Streete-Thompson (CAY)	6.99 m
—	Dmitriy Bagryanov (URS)	NM
—	Borut Bilač (YUG)	NM
—	Craig Hepburn (BAH)	NM

== Final ==
Rank	Athlete	Attempts						Distance	Note
Rank	Athlete	1	2	3	4	5	6	Distance	Note
1st place, gold medalist(s)	Mike Powell (USA)	7.85	8.54	8.29	X	8.95	X	8.95 m	WR
2nd place, silver medalist(s)	Carl Lewis (USA)	8.68	X	8.83w	8.91w	8.87	8.84	8.91 m	PB (8.87)
3rd place, bronze medalist(s)	Larry Myricks (USA)	X	8.20	X	8.41	8.42	X	8.42 m	
4	Dietmar Haaf (GER)	8.01	X	8.22w	8.05w	X	X	8.22 m	
5	Bogdan Tudor (ROM)	7.85	8.00	X	X	8.06	X	8.06 m	
6	Dave Culbert (AUS)	X	7.53	8.02	7.27	X	7.60	8.02 m	
7	Giovanni Evangelisti (ITA)	7.97	7.96	X	X	8.01	7.99	8.01 m	
8	Vladimir Ochkan (URS)	7.99w	X	X	X	5.89	X	7.99 m	
9	Jaime Jefferson (CUB)							7.94 m	
10	André Müller (GER)							7.94 m	
11	Chen Zunrong (CHN)							7.92 m	
12	Konstandinos Koukodimos (GRE)							7.92 m	
13	George Ogbeide (NGR)							7.78 m	

== See also ==
- 1988 Men's Olympic Long Jump (Seoul)
- 1990 Men's European Championships Long Jump
- 1992 Men's Olympic Long Jump
- 1993 Men's World Championships Long Jump
