= 1994 European Athletics Championships – Men's long jump =

Men's long jump at the European Athletics Championships

These are the official results of the Men's Long Jump event at the 1994 European Championships in Helsinki, Finland, held at Helsinki Olympic Stadium on 9 and 10 August 1994. There were a total number of 34 participating athletes, with two qualifying groups.

== Medalists ==
Gold	Ivaylo Mladenov; Bulgaria
Silver	Milan Gombala; Czech Republic
Bronze	Konstadínos Koukodímos; Greece

== Results ==
=== Final ===
- Held on 10 August

Rank	Name	Nationality	Attempts						Result	Notes
Rank	Name	Nationality	1	2	3	4	5	6	Result	Notes
1st place, gold medalist(s)	Ivaylo Mladenov	Bulgaria							8.09 (w: -0.5 m/s)	
2nd place, silver medalist(s)	Milan Gombala	Czech Republic							8.04 (w: 1.4 m/s)	
3rd place, bronze medalist(s)	Konstadínos Koukodímos	Greece							8.01 (w: 0.2 m/s)	
4	Bogdan Tudor	Romania							7.99 (w: 1.7 m/s)	
5	Dmitriy Bagryanov	Russia							7.96 (w: -0.2 m/s)	
6	Stanislav Tarasenko	Russia							7.93 (w: -0.1 m/s)	
7	Vitaliy Kirilenko	Ukraine							7.92 (w: -0.6 m/s)	
8	Erik Nijs	Belgium							7.89 (w: -1.2 m/s)	
9	Mattias Sunneborn	Sweden							7.85 (w: 0.8 m/s)	
10	Aleksandr Glavatskiy	Belarus							7.82 (w: 0.8 m/s)	
11	Milko Campus	Italy							7.76 (w: 1.0 m/s)	
12	Georg Ackermann	Germany							7.70 (w: -0.8 m/s)	

=== Qualification ===
- Held on 9 August

==== Group A ====
Rank	Name	Nationality	Result	Notes
1	Vitaliy Kirilenko	Ukraine	8.11 (w: 1.5 m/s)	Q
2	Stanislav Tarasenko	Russia	8.04 (w: 1.5 m/s)	Q
3	Milan Gombala	Czech Republic	7.95 (w: 0.1 m/s)	q
4	Milko Campus	Italy	7.90 (w: 1.6 m/s)	q
5	Georg Ackermann	Germany	7.89 w (w: 2.1 m/s)	q
6	Aleksandr Glavatskiy	Belarus	7.88 (w: 0.8 m/s)	q
7	Ivaylo Mladenov	Bulgaria	7.83 (w: 0.7 m/s)	q
8	Giovanni Evangelisti	Italy	7.80 (w: -0.8 m/s)	
9	Bogdan Țăruș	Romania	7.79 (w: 1.6 m/s)	
10	Dimitrios Chatzopoulos	Greece	7.73 (w: 1 m/s)	
11	Christian Thomas	Germany	7.66 (w: 0.5 m/s)	
12	Juha Kivi	Finland	7.65 (w: 0.2 m/s)	
13	Gregor Cankar	Slovenia	7.62 (w: 0.6 m/s)	
14	Frans Maas	Netherlands	7.53 (w: 0.2 m/s)	
15	Csaba Almási	Hungary	7.13 (w: 0.6 m/s)	
16	János Uzsoki	Hungary	7.11 (w: 0.8 m/s)	
	Armen Martirosyan	Armenia	DNS	

==== Group B ====
Rank	Name	Nationality	Result	Notes
1	Erik Nijs	Belgium	8.03 (w: 1.1 m/s)	Q
2	Konstadínos Koukodímos	Greece	8.00 (w: 1.7 m/s)	Q
3	Mattias Sunneborn	Sweden	7.98 (w: 0.8 m/s)	q
4	Dmitriy Bagryanov	Russia	7.95 (w: 1.4 m/s)	q
5	Bogdan Tudor	Romania	7.88 (w: 1 m/s)	q
6	Simone Bianchi	Italy	7.80 (w: 0.1 m/s)	
7	Ángel Hernández	Spain	7.73 (w: 1 m/s)	
8	Robert Emmiyan	Armenia	7.69 (w: 0.8 m/s)	
9	Barrington Williams	United Kingdom	7.69 (w: 1.1 m/s)	
10	Nikolay Antonov	Bulgaria	7.63 (w: 0 m/s)	
11	Dietmar Haaf	Germany	7.55 (w: 0.3 m/s)	
12	Jarmo Kärnä	Finland	7.55 (w: 0.9 m/s)	
13	Siniša Ergotić	Croatia	7.55 (w: 0.1 m/s)	
14	Tibor Ordina	Hungary	7.52 (w: 0.1 m/s)	
15	Roman Orlík	Czech Republic	7.50 (w: 0.7 m/s)	
16	Andrey Ignatov	Russia	7.42 (w: 0.8 m/s)	
	Kenneth Kastrén	Finland	NM	

== Participation ==
According to an unofficial count, 33 athletes from 19 countries participated in the event.

- Armenia (1)
- Belarus (1)
- Belgium (1)
- Bulgaria (2)
- Croatia (1)
- Czech Republic (2)
- Finland (3)
- Germany (3)
- Greece (2)
- Hungary (3)
- Italy (3)
- Netherlands (1)
- Romania (2)
- Russia (3)
- Slovenia (1)
- Spain (1)
- Sweden (1)
- Ukraine (1)
- United Kingdom (1)

== See also ==
- 1990 Men's European Championships Long Jump (Split)
- 1991 Men's World Championships Long Jump (Tokyo)
- 1992 Men's Olympic Long Jump (Barcelona)
- 1993 Men's World Championships Long Jump (Stuttgart)
- 1995 Men's World Championships Long Jump (Gothenburg)
- 1996 Men's Olympic Long Jump (Atlanta)
- 1997 Men's World Championships Long Jump (Athens)
- 1998 Men's European Championships Long Jump (Budapest)
