= Athletics at the 1992 Summer Olympics – Men's long jump =

Men's Long jump at the Games of the XXV Olympiad
- Pictogram for Athletics
- Venue: Estadi Olímpic de Montjuïc
- Dates: 5 August (qualifying); 6 August (final)
- Competitors: 50 from 37 nations
- Winning distance: 8.67

Medalists
| 1st place, gold medalist(s) | | Carl Lewis; United States |
| 2nd place, silver medalist(s) | | Mike Powell; United States |
| 3rd place, bronze medalist(s) | | Joe Greene; United States |

Official Video Highlights @ 7:32

The men's long jump was an event at the 1992 Summer Olympics in Barcelona, Spain. There were 50 participating athletes from 37 nations, with two qualifying groups. The maximum number of athletes per nation had been set at three since the 1930 Olympic Congress. The event was won by 3 cm by Carl Lewis of the United States, the nation's third consecutive and 19th overall gold medal in the men's long jump. Lewis became the second man to win three medals in the event (after Ralph Boston) and the first to win three golds. His winning margin of 3 cm would prove to be his narrowest of his four Olympic titles. Mike Powell repeated his silver medal performance from 1988, becoming the eighth two-medal winner in the event. Joe Greene took bronze, completing the United States' second consecutive and fourth overall (1896, 1904, 1988) medal sweep in the men's long jump.

== Background ==
This was the 22nd appearance of the event, which is one of 12 athletics events to have been held at every Summer Olympics. The returning finalists from the 1988 Games were two-time gold medalist Carl Lewis and silver medalist Mike Powell of the United States, fourth-place finisher (and 1984 bronze medalist) Giovanni Evangelisti of Italy, sixth-place finisher László Szalma of Hungary, and twelfth-place finisher Mark Forsythe of Great Britain. Lewis was looking for a third gold, but Powell had beaten him at the 1991 world championships (finally breaking Bob Beamon's 1968 world record of 8.90 metres with an 8.95 metre jump, as well as snapping Lewis's streak of 65 straight victories in the long jump) and the U.S. Olympic trials.

Burkina Faso, the Cayman Islands, El Salvador, Grenada, Guinea, the Seychelles, Slovenia, Sudan, and Zimbabwe each made their first appearance in the event; some former Soviet republics appeared as the Unified Team. The United States appeared for the 21st time, most of any nation, having missed only the boycotted 1980 Games.

== Competition format ==
The 1992 competition used the two-round format with divided final introduced in 1952. The qualifying round gave each competitor three jumps to achieve a distance of 8.05 metres; if fewer than 12 men did so, the top 12 (including all those tied) would advance. The final provided each jumper with three jumps; the top eight jumpers received an additional three jumps for a total of six, with the best to count (qualifying round jumps were not considered for the final).

== Records ==
The standing world and Olympic records prior to the event were as follows.

| World record | Mike Powell (USA) | 8.95 | Tokyo, Japan | 30 August 1991 |
| Olympic record | Bob Beamon (USA) | 8.90 | Mexico City, Mexico | 18 October 1968 |

No new world or Olympic records were set during the competition.

== Schedule ==
All times are Central European Summer Time (UTC+2)

| Date | Time | Round |
|---|---|---|
| Wednesday, 5 August 1992 | | Qualifying |
| Thursday, 6 August 1992 | 18:50 | Final |

== Results ==
=== Qualifying ===
| Rank | Athlete | Nation | 1 | 2 | 3 | Distance | Notes |
|---|---|---|---|---|---|---|---|
| 1 | Carl Lewis | United States | 8.68 | — | — | 8.68 | Q |
| 2 | Geng Huang | China | 7.90 | 8.22 | — | 8.22 | Q |
| 3 | Konstantinos Koukodimos | Greece | 8.22 | — | — | 8.22 | Q |
| 4 | Mike Powell | United States | 8.14 | — | — | 8.14 | Q |
| 5 | Jaime Jefferson | Cuba | 7.96 | 7.97 | 8.09 | 8.09 | Q |
| 6 | Dmitriy Bagryanov | Unified Team | 7.95 | 8.09 | — | 8.09 | Q |
| 7 | Iván Pedroso | Cuba | 7.83 | 8.07 | — | 8.07 | Q |
| 8 | Bogdan Tudor | Romania | 7.51 | 7.60 | 8.07 | 8.07 | Q |
| 9 | David Culbert | Australia | 8.00 | 7.59 | X | 8.00 | q |
| 10 | Borut Bilač | Slovenia | X | 8.00 | X | 8.00 | q |
| 11 | Chen Zunrong | China | 7.93 | X | 7.90 | 7.93 | q |
| 12 | Joe Greene | United States | 7.69 | X | 7.90 | 7.90 | q |
| 13 | Craig Hepburn | Bahamas | X | 7.89 | 7.81 | 7.89 | |
| 14 | Dietmar Haaf | Germany | X | 7.74 | 7.85 | 7.85 | |
| 15 | Mark Mason | Guyana | 7.42 | 7.83 | X | 7.83 | |
| 16 | Spyridon Vasdekis | Greece | 7.67 | 7.82 | 7.71 | 7.82 | |
| 17 | Masaki Morinaga | Japan | 7.74 | 7.78 | 7.79 | 7.79 | |
| 18 | Jesus Olivan | Spain | X | 7.78 | X | 7.78 | |
| 19 | Galin Georgiev | Bulgaria | 7.37 | X | 7.75 | 7.75 | |
| 20 | Ian James | Canada | X | 7.74 | X | 7.74 | |
| 21 | Franck Lestage | France | 7.72 | 7.65 | 7.66 | 7.72 | |
| 22 | Mark Forsythe | Great Britain | 7.71 | X | X | 7.71 | |
| 23 | Elmer Williams | Puerto Rico | 7.63 | 7.56 | 7.70 | 7.70 | |
| 24 | Franck Zio | Burkina Faso | 7.47 | 7.63 | 7.70 | 7.70 | |
| 25 | Milan Gombala | Czechoslovakia | 7.54 | X | 7.69 | 7.69 | |
| 26 | Csaba Almási | Hungary | X | X | 7.69 | 7.69 | |
| 27 | Thomas Ganda | Sierra Leone | 7.67 | 7.40 | 7.43 | 7.67 | |
| 28 | Edrick Floreal | Canada | 7.62 | 7.54 | 7.62 | 7.62 | |
| 29 | Roman Golanowski | Poland | X | X | 7.61 | 7.61 | |
| 30 | Eugene Licorish | Grenada | 7.57 | 7.60 | 7.54 | 7.60 | |
| 31 | Serge Helan | France | 7.60 | X | 7.48 | 7.60 | |
| 32 | Konstantin Krause | Germany | X | X | 7.54 | 7.54 | |
| 33 | James Sabulei | Kenya | 7.50 | 7.37 | 7.38 | 7.50 | |
| 34 | László Szalma | Hungary | 7.47 | 7.40 | 7.36 | 7.47 | |
| 35 | Michael Francis | Puerto Rico | X | X | 7.46 | 7.46 | |
| 36 | Benjamin Koech | Kenya | 7.43 | 7.44 | 7.32 | 7.44 | |
| 37 | Danny Beauchamp | Seychelles | X | X | 7.44 | 7.44 | |
| 38 | Kareem Streete-Thompson | Cayman Islands | 7.39 | X | X | 7.39 | |
| 39 | Angelo Iannuzzelli | El Salvador | X | 7.31 | X | 7.31 | |
| 40 | Abdullah Mohamed Al-Sheib | Qatar | X | 7.27 | X | 7.27 | |
| 41 | Gabrieli Qoro | Fiji | 7.22 | X | 5.19 | 7.22 | |
| 41 | Khaled Ahmed Musa | Sudan | 7.03 | 7.02 | 6.54 | 7.03 | |
| 43 | Ndabazinhle Mdhlongwa | Zimbabwe | 6.96 | 6.95 | 6.96 | 6.96 | |
| 44 | Elston Shaw | Belize | 6.29 | 6.38 | 6.57 | 6.57 | |
| 45 | Vadim Ivanov | Unified Team | X | X | 5.97 | 5.97 | |
| 46 | Abdelkader Klouchi | Algeria | 5.33 | X | X | 5.33 | |
| — | Giovanni Evangelisti | Italy | X | X | X | No mark | |
| — | Ángel Hernández | Spain | X | X | X | No mark | |
| — | Sydney Mdluli | Swaziland | X | X | X | No mark | |
| — | Soryba Diakite | Guinea | X | — | — | No mark | |
| — | Musabeh Al-Hadhrami | United Arab Emirates | DNS | | | | |
| — | Afonso Ferraz | Angola | DNS | | | | |
| — | Badara Mbengue | Senegal | DNS | | | | |

=== Final ===
| Rank | Athlete | Nation | 1 | 2 | 3 | 4 | 5 | 6 | Distance |
|---|---|---|---|---|---|---|---|---|---|
| 1st place, gold medalist(s) | Carl Lewis | United States | 8.67 | 8.33 | X | X | 8.50 | 8.50 | 8.67 |
| 2nd place, silver medalist(s) | Mike Powell | United States | 7.95 | 8.22 | 8.33 | X | 8.53 | 8.64 | 8.64 |
| 3rd place, bronze medalist(s) | Joe Greene | United States | X | X | 7.88 | 8.34 | 8.14 | X | 8.34 |
| 4 | Iván Pedroso | Cuba | 7.79 | 8.11 | 8.01 | 7.98 | 8.11 | 7.51 | 8.11 |
| 5 | Jaime Jefferson | Cuba | 7.30 | 7.69 | 8.08 | 7.93 | 8.00 | X | 8.08 |
| 6 | Konstantinos Koukodimos | Greece | 7.30 | 7.99 | 7.92 | 8.04 | 7.88 | 7.50 | 8.04 |
| 7 | Dmitriy Bagryanov | Unified Team | 7.79 | 5.74 | X | 7.98 | 7.88 | 7.84 | 7.98 |
| 8 | Geng Huang | China | 7.33 | 7.58 | 7.87 | 7.79 | 7.55 | 7.65 | 7.87 |
| 9 | Borut Bilač | Slovenia | X | 7.60 | 7.76 | Did not advance | | | 7.76 |
| 10 | Chen Zunrong | China | 7.71 | 7.47 | 7.75 | Did not advance | | | 7.75 |
| 11 | David Culbert | Australia | 7.36 | 7.30 | 7.73 | Did not advance | | | 7.73 |
| 12 | Bogdan Tudor | Romania | 7.26 | 7.37 | 7.61 | Did not advance | | | 7.61 |

== See also ==
- 1990 Men's European Championships Long Jump
- 1991 Men's World Championships Long Jump
- 1993 Men's World Championships Long Jump
