= 1987 IAAF World Indoor Championships – Men's long jump =

The men's long jump event at the 1987 IAAF World Indoor Championships was held at the Hoosier Dome in Indianapolis on 6 March. There was no qualification round, only a final round.

== Results ==
Rank	Name	Nationality	#1	#2	#3	#4	#5	#6	Result	Notes
1st place, gold medalist(s)	Larry Myricks	United States	8.00	8.18	8.15	8.06	8.10	8.23	8.23	CR
2nd place, silver medalist(s)	Paul Emordi	Nigeria	7.74	7.72	7.92	7.84	8.01	x	8.01	
3rd place, bronze medalist(s)	Giovanni Evangelisti	Italy	7.57	7.91	8.01	7.86	x	x	8.01	
4	Robert Emmiyan	Soviet Union	x	7.92	x	8.00	x	8.00	8.00	
5	Brian Cooper	United States	7.37	7.82	7.91	7.61	x	7.72	7.91	
6	Laszlo Szalma	Hungary	7.47	7.69	7.87	x	–	–	7.87	
7	Dimitrios Hadzopoulos	Greece	x	7.85	x	x	7.54	x	7.85	
8	Frans Maas	Netherlands	x	7.84	x	5.43	7.67	7.50	7.84	
9	Yusuf Alli	Nigeria	7.67	7.78	6.42				7.78	
10	Jaime Jefferson	Cuba	7.42	7.66	7.78				7.78	
11	Junichi Usui	Japan	x	x	7.75				7.75	
12	Norbert Brige	France	7.62	x	7.69				7.69	
13	Chen Zunrong	China	x	x	7.67				7.67	
14	Lester Benjamin	Antigua and Barbuda	x	7.48	7.48				7.48	
15	Christian Thomas	West Germany	7.43	7.48	x				7.48	
16	Michael Morgan	Australia	7.18	x	7.38				7.38	
17	Demetrios Araouzos	Cyprus	7.20	7.34	x				7.34	
18	John Albertie	Saint Lucia	6.95	6.59	7.12				7.12	NR
	Orde Ballantyne	Saint Vincent and the Grenadines	x	x	x				NM	
	Jesús Oliván	Spain							DNS	
