= 1988 European Athletics Indoor Championships – Men's long jump =

The men's long jump event at the 1988 European Athletics Indoor Championships was held on 5 March.

== Results ==
Rank	Name	Nationality	#1	#2	#3	#4	#5	#6	Result	Notes
1st place, gold medalist(s)	Frans Maas	Netherlands	7.83	x	7.95	x	x	8.06	8.06	
2nd place, silver medalist(s)	László Szálma	Hungary	7.86	7.63	8.00	7.80	7.79	8.03	8.03	
3rd place, bronze medalist(s)	Giovanni Evangelisti	Italy	7.91	x	x	x	x	8.00	8.00	
4	Emiel Mellaard	Netherlands	7.67	7.79	x	7.67	7.71	7.84	7.84	
5	Dietmar Haaf	West Germany	x	7.77	x	x	7.79	x	7.79	
6	Jarmo Kärnä	Finland	7.72	7.67	7.54	7.52			7.72	
7	Gyula Pálóczi	Hungary	7.47	7.70	7.62	x	7.71	7.40	7.71	
8	Mirosław Hydel	Poland	7.64	x	7.70	7.34	x	7.48	7.70	
9	Michael Becker	West Germany	7.20	7.55	7.66				7.66	
10	Antonio Corgos	Spain	x	7.64	7.37				7.64	
11	Claude Morinière	France	7.61	x	7.50				7.61	
12	Juha Plosila	Finland	7.45	7.56	7.55				7.56	
13	Vladimir Amidzhinov	Bulgaria	7.43	7.41	7.54				7.54	
14	Krzysztof Kaniecki	Poland	7.35	7.41	x				7.41	
15	Teddy Steinmayr	Austria	x	7.31	7.37				7.37	
16	Giuseppe Bertozzi	Italy	7.12	6.99	6.96				7.12	
	Konstantinos Koukodimos	Greece	x	x	x				NM	
	René Zeman	Austria							DNS	
	Giancarlo Biscarini	Italy							DNS	
	Ron Beer	East Germany							DNS	
