= Athletics at the 1987 Summer Universiade – Men's long jump =

The men's long jump event at the 1987 Summer Universiade was held at the Stadion Maksimir in Zagreb on 14 and 16 July 1987.

== Medalists ==
Gold	Silver	Bronze
Mike Powell; United States	Paul Emordi; Nigeria	Sergey Zaozerskiy; Soviet Union

== Results ==
=== Qualification ===
Qualification distance: 7.75 metres

Rank	Group	Athlete	Nationality	Result	Notes
1	?	Brian Cooper	United States	8.00	Q
2	?	Mike Powell	United States	7.97	Q
3	?	Elmer Williams	Puerto Rico	7.89	Q
4	?	Kim Won-Jin	South Korea	7.83	Q
5	?	Dave Culbert	Australia	7.82	Q
6	?	Paul Emordi	Nigeria	7.81	Q
7	?	Bruny Surin	Canada	7.79	Q
8	?	Krasimir Minchev	Bulgaria	7.74	
9	?	Pang Yan	China	7.74	
10	?	Sergey Zaozerskiy	Soviet Union	7.73	
11	?	Claudio Cherubini	Italy	7.68	
12	?	Andrzej Klimaszewski	Poland	7.65	
13	?	Sergey Kirillov	Soviet Union	7.60	
14	?	Ivo Krsek	Czechoslovakia	7.59	
15	?	Theodoros Tantanozis	Greece	7.51	
16	?	Li Tong	China	7.45	
17	?	Christian Thomas	West Germany	7.42	
18	?	Ian James	Canada	7.41	
19	?	Giancarlo Biscarini	Italy	7.38	
19	?	Peter Fossey	Australia	7.38	
21	?	Hartmut Eifler	West Germany	7.32	
22	?	José Leitão	Portugal	7.28	
23	?	Andreas Steiner	Austria	7.27	
24	?	Badara Mbengué	Senegal	7.25	
25	?	Fernando Valiente	Peru	7.22	
26	?	Ángel Hernández	Spain	7.17	
27	?	Ricardo Valiente	Peru	7.16	
28	?	Jovica Petrović	Yugoslavia	7.03	
29	?	Jean-Marie Mouanda	Republic of the Congo	6.98	
30	?	Marvin Reid	Jamaica	6.96	
31	?	Billy Oakes	Ireland	6.66	
32	?	Barney Bonne	Seychelles	6.62	
33	?	Hassan Ghazala	Morocco	6.61	
34	?	Viasi Narukutabua	Fiji	6.23	
35	?	Filipe da Conceição	São Tomé and Príncipe	6.22	
36	?	Jone Marayawa	Fiji	6.14	

=== Final ===
Rank	Athlete	Nationality	Result	Notes
1st place, gold medalist(s)	Mike Powell	United States	8.19	
2nd place, silver medalist(s)	Paul Emordi	Nigeria	8.11	
3rd place, bronze medalist(s)	Sergey Zaozerskiy	Soviet Union	8.06	
4	Andrzej Klimaszewski	Poland	8.04	
5	Brian Cooper	United States	7.97	
6	Krasimir Minchev	Bulgaria	7.89	
7	Pang Yan	China	7.84	
8	Kim Won-Jin	South Korea	7.83	
9	Dave Culbert	Australia	7.76	
10	Bruny Surin	Canada	7.72	
11	Elmer Williams	Puerto Rico	7.65	
12	Claudio Cherubini	Italy	7.56	
