= 1986 World Junior Championships in Athletics – Men's long jump =

The men's long jump event at the 1986 World Junior Championships in Athletics was held in Athens, Greece, at Olympic Stadium on 17 and 18 July.

== Medalists ==
Gold	Dietmar Haaf; West Germany
Silver	Ivo Krsek; Czechoslovakia
Bronze	Thomas Wolf; East Germany

== Results ==
=== Final ===
18 July

Rank	Name	Nationality	Result	Notes
1st place, gold medalist(s)	Dietmar Haaf	West Germany	7.93	
2nd place, silver medalist(s)	Ivo Krsek	Czechoslovakia	7.87	
3rd place, bronze medalist(s)	Thomas Wolf	East Germany	7.77	
4	David Culbert	Australia	7.71	
5	Lahor Marinović	Yugoslavia	7.69	
6	Kim Won-Jin	South Korea	7.64	
7	Li Tong	China	7.59	
8	Kostas Koukodimos	Greece	7.58	
9	Oleg Kurbatov	Soviet Union	7.51	
10	Dimítrios Hatzopoulos	Greece	7.49	
11	Lisandro Milhet	Cuba	7.46 w	
12	Rod Tolbert	United States	7.42	

=== Qualifications ===
17 Jul

==== Group A ====
Rank	Name	Nationality	Result	Notes
1	Thomas Wolf	East Germany	7.73	Q
2	Lahor Marinović	Yugoslavia	7.71	Q
3	Kostas Koukodimos	Greece	7.47	q
4	Kim Won-Jin	South Korea	7.43	q
5	Scott Sanders	United States	7.34	
6	Edward Manderson	Cayman Islands	7.21	
	Oleg Konovalenko	Soviet Union	7.21	
8	Jonathon Moyle	New Zealand	7.19	
9	René Zeman	Austria	7.13	
	Bernhard Kelm	West Germany	7.13	
11	Rami Lev-Ram	Israel	7.08	
12	Pascal Pierrot	France	7.00	
13	Milan Gombala	Czechoslovakia	6.99	
14	Roland Waibel	Switzerland	6.81	
15	Glenroy Gilbert	Canada	6.78	
16	Yousef Awad	Egypt	6.47	
17	William Akanoa	Cook Islands	6.45	
18	Allen Wheatley	British Virgin Islands	6.22	
19	Francisco Colorado	El Salvador	5.91	
20	Richard Dolmetsch	Colombia	5.87	
	Lotfi Khaïda	Algeria	NM	
	Javier San Adrian	Spain	NM	
	Andy St. Remy	U.S. Virgin Islands	NM	

==== Group B ====
Rank	Name	Nationality	Result	Notes
1	Dietmar Haaf	West Germany	7.91	Q
2	Ivo Krsek	Czechoslovakia	7.75	Q
3	David Culbert	Australia	7.67	Q
4	Dimítrios Hatzopoulos	Greece	7.63	Q
5	Oleg Kurbatov	Soviet Union	7.62	Q
6	Lisandro Milhet	Cuba	7.60	Q
7	Li Tong	China	7.45	q
8	Rod Tolbert	United States	7.43	q
9	Jesús Oliván	Spain	7.41	
10	Babou Saine	Gambia	7.33	
11	Attila Szekeres	Hungary	7.30	
12	Paulo de Oliveira	Brazil	7.25	
13	Yoshimi Hirota	Japan	7.24	
14	Stoyan Stanchev	Bulgaria	7.20	
	Pär-Ola Gustafsson	Sweden	7.20	
16	J. Augustine	India	7.06	
17	Richard Duval	Mauritius	6.95	
18	Hugh Hamilton	Canada	6.89	
19	Toyi Simklima	Togo	6.32	
20	Mauricio Vel Domínguez	Colombia	6.00	
21	Ahmed Mohamed	Comoros	5.67	

== Participation ==
According to an unofficial count, 44 athletes from 36 countries participated in the event.

- Algeria (1)
- Australia (1)
- Austria (1)
- Brazil (1)
- British Virgin Islands (1)
- Bulgaria (1)
- Canada (2)
- Cayman Islands (1)
- China (1)
- Colombia (2)
- Comoros (1)
- Cook Islands (1)
- Cuba (1)
- Czechoslovakia (2)
- East Germany (1)
- Egypt (1)
- El Salvador (1)
- France (1)
- Gambia (1)
- Greece (2)
- Hungary (1)
- India (1)
- Israel (1)
- Japan (1)
- Mauritius (1)
- New Zealand (1)
- South Korea (1)
- Soviet Union (2)
- Spain (2)
- Sweden (1)
- Switzerland (1)
- Togo (1)
- United States (2)
- U.S. Virgin Islands (1)
- West Germany (2)
- Yugoslavia (1)
