= 1989 European Athletics Indoor Championships – Men's long jump =

The men's long jump event at the 1989 European Athletics Indoor Championships was held on 19 February.

== Results ==
Rank	Name	Nationality	#1	#2	#3	#4	#5	#6	Result	Notes
1st place, gold medalist(s)	Emiel Mellaard	Netherlands	7.99	7.89	8.10	8.14	?	?	8.14	
2nd place, silver medalist(s)	Antonio Corgos	Spain	7.97	8.12	7.91	8.12	?	?	8.12	=NR
3rd place, bronze medalist(s)	Frans Maas	Netherlands							8.11	
4	László Szálma	Hungary							8.06	
5	Dietmar Haaf	West Germany							7.96	
6	Jarmo Kärnä	Finland							7.94	
7	Norbert Brige	France							7.80	
8	Juha Kivi	Finland							7.78	
9	Christian Thomas	West Germany							7.75	
10	Paul Johnson	Great Britain							7.61	
11	Juha Plosila	Finland							7.61	
12	Stewart Faulkner	Great Britain							7.59	
13	Robert Zmelík	Czechoslovakia							7.48	
14	Vasiliy Sokov	Soviet Union							7.45	
15	Csaba Almási	Hungary							7.40	
	Michael Arnold	Austria							NM	
