= Norbert Brige =

French long jumper

Norbert Brige (born 9 January 1964) is a retired French long jumper.

His personal best jump was 8.22 metres, achieved in September 1988 in Nîmes. This ranks him eighth on the French all-time list, behind Kader Klouchi, Jacques Rousseau, Emmanuel Bangué, Ronald Servius, Mickaël Loria, Cheikh Touré and Salim Sdiri.

== International competitions ==
Year	Competition	Venue	Position	Notes
Representing France
1983	European Indoor Championships	Budapest, Hungary	12th	7.18 m
1983	European Junior Championships	Schwechat, Austria	4th	7.83 m
1986	European Indoor Championships	Madrid, Spain	10th	7.81 m
1986	European Championships	Stuttgart, West Germany	6th	7.72 m
1987	European Indoor Championships	Liévin, France	5th	8.05 m
1987	World Indoor Championships	Indianapolis, United States	12th	7.69 m
1987	World Championships	Rome, Italy	15th	7.82 m
1988	Olympic Games	Seoul, South Korea	7th	7.97 m
1989	European Indoor Championships	The Hague, Netherlands	7th	7.80 m
1989	World Indoor Championships	Budapest, Hungary	6th	7.91 m
1989	Jeux de la Francophonie	Casablanca, Morocco	3rd	7.75 m
