= Vadim Ivanov =

Vadim Ivanov may refer to:

- Vadim Ivanov (footballer) (1943–96), Soviet Russian footballer and manager
- Vadim Ivanov (figure skater) (born 1994), Russian figure skater
- Vadim Ivanov (long jumper) (born 1968), Soviet Russian long jumper
