= 1989 IAAF World Indoor Championships – Men's long jump =

The men's long jump event at the 1989 IAAF World Indoor Championships was held at the Budapest Sportcsarnok in Budapest on 4 and 5 March.

== Medallists ==
Gold	Silver	Bronze
Larry Myricks; United States	Dietmar Haaf; West Germany	Mike Conley Sr. United States

== Results ==
=== Qualification ===
Qualification: 7.70 (Q) or at least 12 best performers (q) qualified for the final.

Rank	Name	Nationality	Result	Notes
1	Mike Conley, Sr.	United States	8.02	Q
2	Dietmar Haaf	West Germany	7.84	Q
3	Larry Myricks	United States	7.79	Q
4	László Szalma	Hungary	7.77	Q
5	Norbert Brige	France	7.74	Q
6	Jarmo Kärnä	Finland	7.71	Q
7	Frans Maas	Netherlands	7.71	Q
8	Ubaldo Duany	Cuba	7.67	q
9	Juha Kivi	Finland	7.64	q
10	Jaime Jefferson	Cuba	7.63	q
11	Hiroyuki Shibata	Japan	7.61	q
12	Csaba Almási	Hungary	7.59	q
13	Bruny Surin	Canada	7.57	
14	Pang Yan	China	7.56	
15	Kim Won-jin	South Korea	7.53	
16	Emiel Mellaard	Netherlands	7.42	
17	Nai Hui-Fang	Chinese Taipei	7.38	
18	Glenroy Gilbert	Canada	7.33	
19	Fred Salle	Cameroon	7.31	

=== Final ===
Rank	Name	Nationality	#1	#2	#3	#4	#5	#6	Result	Notes
1st place, gold medalist(s)	Larry Myricks	United States	x	8.04	8.04	8.26	8.37	8.32	8.37	CR
2nd place, silver medalist(s)	Dietmar Haaf	West Germany	8.06	8.07	x	6.29	x	8.17	8.17	
3rd place, bronze medalist(s)	Mike Conley Sr.	United States	x	8.05	x	8.11	8.00	x	8.11	
4	László Szalma	Hungary	7.88	7.75	7.83	8.01	?	?	8.10	
5	Jaime Jefferson	Cuba							7.96	
6	Norbert Brige	France							7.91	
7	Ubaldo Duany	Cuba	7.66	7.86	7.58	7.67	x		7.86	
8	Frans Maas	Netherlands							7.83	
9	Jarmo Kärnä	Finland							7.78	
10	Juha Kivi	Finland							7.54	
11	Hiroyuki Shibata	Japan							7.50	
12	Csaba Almási	Hungary							7.47	
