= 1986 European Athletics Championships – Men's long jump =

Men's long jump at the European Athletics Championships

These are the official results of the Men's long jump event at the 1986 European Championships in Stuttgart, West Germany, held at Neckarstadion on 28 and 29 August 1986.

== Medalists ==
Gold	Robert Emmiyan; Soviet Union
Silver	Sergey Layevskiy; Soviet Union
Bronze	Giovanni Evangelisti; Italy

== Results ==
=== Final ===
29 August

Rank	Name	Nationality	Result	Notes
1st place, gold medalist(s)	Robert Emmiyan	Soviet Union	8.41 (w: 0.0 m/s)	CR
2nd place, silver medalist(s)	Sergey Layevskiy	Soviet Union	8.01 (w: 0.0 m/s)	
3rd place, bronze medalist(s)	Giovanni Evangelisti	Italy	7.92 (w: 0.2 m/s)	
4	Emiel Mellaard	Netherlands	7.91	
5	Stanisław Jaskułka	Poland	7.85 (w: 0.0 m/s)	
6	Norbert Brige	France	7.72 (w: -0.3 m/s)	
7	Ivo Krsek	Czechoslovakia	7.69 (w: 0.0 m/s)	
8	Zdeněk Hanáček	Czechoslovakia	7.59 (w: 0.0 m/s)	
9	Claude Morinière	France	7.51 (w: 0.1 m/s)	
10	Dietmar Haaf	West Germany	7.48 (w: -1.1 m/s)	
11	Andrzej Klimaszewski	Poland	7.39 (w: -0.1 m/s)	
12	Fabrizio Secchi	Italy	7.35 (w: -0.7 m/s)	

=== Qualification ===
28 August

Rank	Name	Nationality	Result	Notes
1	Robert Emmiyan	Soviet Union	8.24 (w: 1.9 m/s)	Q
2	Emiel Mellaard	Netherlands	7.90 (w: 0.8 m/s)	Q
3	Giovanni Evangelisti	Italy	7.87 (w: 0.3 m/s)	Q
4	Sergey Layevskiy	Soviet Union	7.85 (w: 1.4 m/s)	Q
5	Stanisław Jaskułka	Poland	7.85 (w: 1.5 m/s)	Q
6	Norbert Brige	France	7.81 (w: 1.9 m/s)	Q
7	Claude Morinière	France	7.80 (w: 1.1 m/s)	Q
8	Ivo Krsek	Czechoslovakia	7.79 (w: 1.2 m/s)	Q
9	Andrzej Klimaszewski	Poland	7.75 (w: 1.8 m/s)	Q
10	Dietmar Haaf	West Germany	7.74 (w: 0 m/s)	Q
11	Fabrizio Secchi	Italy	7.73 (w: 1.1 m/s)	Q
12	Zdeněk Hanáček	Czechoslovakia	7.70 (w: 1 m/s)	Q
13	Teddy Steinmayr	Austria	7.68 w (w: 2.3 m/s)	
14	Antonio Corgos	Spain	7.67 (w: 0.5 m/s)	
15	Atanas Chochev	Bulgaria	7.59 (w: 0.8 m/s)	
16	Gyula Pálóczi	Hungary	7.49 (w: 1.4 m/s)	
17	Michael Rodosthenous	Cyprus	7.46 (w: 1.3 m/s)	
18	Fred Salle	United Kingdom	7.40 (w: 1.0 m/s)	

== Participation ==
According to an unofficial count, 18 athletes from 13 countries participated in the event.

- Austria (1)
- Bulgaria (1)
- Cyprus (1)
- Czechoslovakia (2)
- France (2)
- Hungary (1)
- Italy (2)
- Netherlands (1)
- Poland (2)
- Soviet Union (2)
- Spain (1)
- United Kingdom (1)
- West Germany (1)

== See also ==
- 1982 Men's European Championships Long Jump (Athens)
- 1983 Men's World Championships Long Jump (Helsinki)
- 1984 Men's Olympic Long Jump (Los Angeles)
- 1987 Men's World Championships Long Jump (Rome)
- 1988 Men's Olympic Long Jump (Seoul)
- 1990 Men's European Championships Long Jump (Split)
