= Bagryanov =

Bagryanov (Bulgarian: Багрянов, Russian: Багрянов) is a Slavic masculine surname, its feminine counterpart is Bagryanova. Notable people with the surname include:

- Ivan Ivanov Bagryanov (1891–1945), Prime Minister of Bulgaria
- Dmitry Bagryanov (born 1967), Russian long jumper
