= Milko Campus =

Italian long jumper

Personal information
- Nationality: Italian
- Born: 2 April 1969 (age 57) Oristano, Italy
- Height: 1.75 m (5 ft 9 in)
- Weight: 62 kg (137 lb)

Sport
- Country: Italy
- Sport: Athletics
- Event: Long jump
- Club: G.S. Fiamme Azzurre

Achievements and titles
- Personal best: Long jump: 8.13 m (1994)
Medal record
Event / 1st / 2nd / 3rd; Military World Games / 1 / 0 / 0
World Military Championships
Gold medal – first place	1995 Rome	4x100 metres relay

Milko Campus (born 2 April 1969) is a retired Italian long jumper.

He won one medal at the International athletics competitions.

== Biography ==
He finished eleventh at the 1994 European Championships. He also competed at the 1990 European Championships without reaching the final. He became Italian champion in 1988, 1989, 1994 and 1995.

His personal best jump was 8.13 metres, achieved in June 1994 in Formia, he has 18 caps in national team from 1988 to 2000.

== National titles ==
Milko Campus has won 6 times the individual national championship.

- 4 wins in long jump (1988, 1989, 1994, 1995)
- 2 wins in long jump indoor (1996, 2005)

== See also ==
- Italian all-time lists - Long jump
