= Bogdan Tudor =

Romanian long jumper

Personal information
- Born: 1 February 1970 (age 56) Bucharest, Romania
- Height: 1.86 m (6 ft 1 in)
- Weight: 76 kg (168 lb)

Sport
- Sport: Track and field
- Event: Long jump
- Club: Steaua București
Medal record
Representing Romania
European Indoor Championships
Bronze medal – third place	1994 Paris	Long jump
Summer Universiade
Bronze medal – third place	1991 Sheffield	Long jump

Bogdan Tudor (born 1 February 1970) is a Romanian long jumper, best known for his bronze medal at the 1994 European Indoor Championships. His personal best and Romanian record is 8.37 metres, achieved in July 1995 in Bad Cannstatt. He has the indoor world record at +35 years category with 7.98 meters, achieved in February 2005.

== Achievements ==
Year	Competition	Venue	Position	Notes
Representing Romania
1989	European Junior Championships	Varaždin, Yugoslavia	5th	7.67 m
1990	European Championships	Split, Yugoslavia	7th	7.86 m
1991	World Indoor Championships	Seville, Spain	5th	7.88 m
1991	Universiade	Sheffield, United Kingdom	3rd	8.01 m
1991	World Championships	Tokyo, Japan	5th	8.06 m
1992	European Indoor Championships	Genoa, Italy	5th	7.92 m
1992	Olympic Games	Barcelona, Spain	12th	7.61 m
1993	World Indoor Championships	Toronto, Canada	5th	7.91 m
1993	Universiade	Buffalo, United States	4th	7.93 m
1994	European Indoor Championships	Paris, France	3rd	8.07 m
1994	European Championships	Helsinki, Finland	4th	7.99 m
1995	World Indoor Championships	Barcelona, Spain	5th	8.11 m
1995	World Championships	Gothenburg, Sweden	5th	8.01 m
1995	Universiade	Fukuoka, Japan	4th	8.11 m
1995	Military World Games	Rome, Italy	1st	8.05 m
1996	European Indoor Championships	Stockholm, Sweden	6th	7.88 m
1996	Olympic Games	Atlanta, United States	19th (q)	7.88 m
1997	World Indoor Championships	Paris, France	10th	7.94 m
1997	World Championships	Athens, Greece	11th	7.66 m
1997	Universiade	Catania, Italy	12th	7.47 m
1998	European Championships	Budapest, Hungary	25th (q)	7.66 m
1999	World Indoor Championships	Maebashi, Japan	8th	7.88 m
2000	European Indoor Championships	Ghent, Belgium	7th	7.80 m
2005	European Indoor Championships	Madrid, Spain	25th (q)	7.47 m
2006	European Championships	Gothenburg, Sweden	17th (q)	7.76 m
2014	World Masters Indoor Championships	Budapest, Hungary	1st	6.83 m
2016	European Masters Indoor Championships	Ancona, Italy	1st	6.62 m
2019	European Masters Championships	Jesolo, Italy	2nd	6.38 m
