= Angelo Iannuzzelli =

Salvadoran long jumper

Personal information
- Born: 10 April 1970 (age 56) San Salvador, El Salvador

Sport
- Sport: Athletics
- Event: Long jump

Angelo Iannuzzelli (born 10 April 1970) is a Salvadoran athlete. He competed in the men's long jump at the 1992 Summer Olympics.
