= Milan Gombala =

Czech long jumper

Medal record

Men's athletics

Representing Czech Republic

European Championships
Silver medal – second place	1994 Helsinki	Long jump

Milan Gombala (born 29 January 1968 in Lučenec) is a retired Czech long jumper, best known for his silver medal at the 1994 European Championships. His personal best is 8.04 metres, achieved in August 1995 in Linz.

== International competitions ==
Year	Competition	Venue	Position	Notes
Representing Czechoslovakia
1986	World Junior Championships	Athens, Greece	29th (q)	6.99 m
1987	European Junior Championships	Birmingham, United Kingdom	3rd	7.63 m
1990	European Indoor Championships	Glasgow, United Kingdom	13th	7.63 m
1991	World Championships	Tokyo, Japan	19th (q)	7.89 m
1992	European Indoor Championships	Genoa, Italy	20th	7.46 m
1992	Olympic Games	Barcelona, Spain	25th (q)	7.69 m
Representing the Czech Republic
1993	World Indoor Championships	Toronto, Canada	13th (q)	7.69 m
1993	World Championships	Stuttgart, Germany	11th	7.77 m
1994	European Indoor Championships	Paris, France	22nd (q)	7.65 m
1994	European Championships	Helsinki, Finland	2nd	8.04 m
1995	World Indoor Championships	Barcelona, Spain	6th	7.95 m
1995	World Championships	Gothenburg, Sweden	13th (q)	7.88 m
1996	European Indoor Championships	Barcelona, Spain	7th (q)	7.89 m^{1}
1996	Olympic Games	Atlanta, United States	20th (q)	7.88 m

^{1}No mark in the final
