= Erik Nys =

Belgian long jumper

Personal information
- Born: 27 July 1973 (age 53) Bree, Belgium

Sport
- Sport: Track and field
Medal record
Representing Belgium
Summer Universiade
Bronze medal – third place	1999 Palma de Mallorca	Long jump

Erik Nys (born 27 July 1973) is a retired Belgian long jumper.

His personal best jump is 8.25 metres, achieved in July 1996 in Hechtel. This is the current Belgian record.

== Achievements ==
Year	Competition	Venue	Position	Event	Notes
Representing Belgium
1992	World Junior Championships	Seoul, South Korea	27th (q)	High jump	2.05 m
1992	World Junior Championships	Seoul, South Korea	10th	Long jump	7.36 m (+0.2 m/s)
1993	Universiade	Buffalo, United States	10th	Long jump	7.51 m
1994	European Indoor Championships	Paris, France	13th	Long jump	7.47 m
1994	European Championships	Helsinki, Finland	8th	Long jump	7.89 m (-1.2 m/s)
1995	World Indoor Championships	Barcelona, Spain	7th	Long jump	7.88 m
1996	European Indoor Championships	Stockholm, Sweden	15th (q)	Long jump	7.77 m
1996	Olympic Games	Atlanta, United States	13th	Long jump	7.72 m
1997	Universiade	Catania, Italy	–	Long jump	NM
1999	Universiade	Palma de Mallorca, Spain	3rd	Long jump	7.99 m
1999	World Championships	Seville, Spain	11th	Long jump	7.83 m
2000	European Indoor Championships	Ghent, Belgium	14th (q)	Long jump	7.68 m
2000	Olympic Games	Sydney, Australia	37th (q)	Long jump	7.52 m
