= Nai Hui-fang =

Taiwanese long jumper and triple jumper

Personal information
- Born: 26 February 1969 (age 57)

Sport
- Sport: Track and field
Medal record
Representing Chinese Taipei
Asian Championships
Gold medal – first place	1989 New Delhi	Long jump
Bronze medal – third place	1989 New Delhi	Triple jump
Bronze medal – third place	1991 Kuala Lumpur	Long jump
Bronze medal – third place	1993 Manila	Long jump

Nai Hui-fang (Chinese: 乃慧芳; pinyin: Nǎi Huì-fāng; born 26 February 1969) is a Taiwanese former long jumper and triple jumper.

== Career ==
In age-specific competitions, Nai Hui-fang notably won the silver medal in long jump at the 1986 Asian Junior Championships and gold medals in both long and triple jump at the 1988 Asian Junior Championships. He competed in the high jump at the 1986 World Junior Championships without reaching the final, followed by three events at the 1988 World Junior Championships: He won the bronze medal in the long jump, finished fourth in the triple jump and competed in the 4 × 100 metres relay without reaching the final.

He competed in the same three events at the 1988 Olympic Games without reaching the final in neither. 1989 saw Nai Hui-fang compete in the 1989 World Indoor Championships without reaching the final, before taking his first Asian title. At the 1989 Asian Championships, he won the long jump event and took the triple jump bronze. Lastly, he finished eighth in the long jump at the 1989 Summer Universiade as well as eighth in the 4 × 100 metres relay.

He followed up with consecutive long jump bronzes at the 1991 and 1993 Asian Championships, an eighth place at the 1993 World Indoor Championships and a gold medal at the 1993 East Asian Games in Shanghai, jumping 8.34 metres. He also competed at the 1993 World Championships without reaching the final, finished sixth at both the 1994 Goodwill Games, 1994 Asian Games and the 1997 East Asian Games and competed at the 1996 Olympic Games, the 1997 World Indoor Championships and the 1997 World Championships without reaching the final.

Nai holds the Taiwanese long jump (8.34m) and triple jump (16.65m) records.
