= Ivan Stoyanov (long jumper) =

Bulgarian long jumper

Ivan Stoyanov (Bulgarian: Иван Стоянов, born 16 November 1969) is a retired Bulgarian long jumper.

He competed at the 1991 World Championships without reaching the final. He became Bulgarian champion in the same year.

His personal best jump was 8.03 metres, achieved in June 1991 in Plovdiv.
