= Emiel Mellaard =

Dutch long jumper

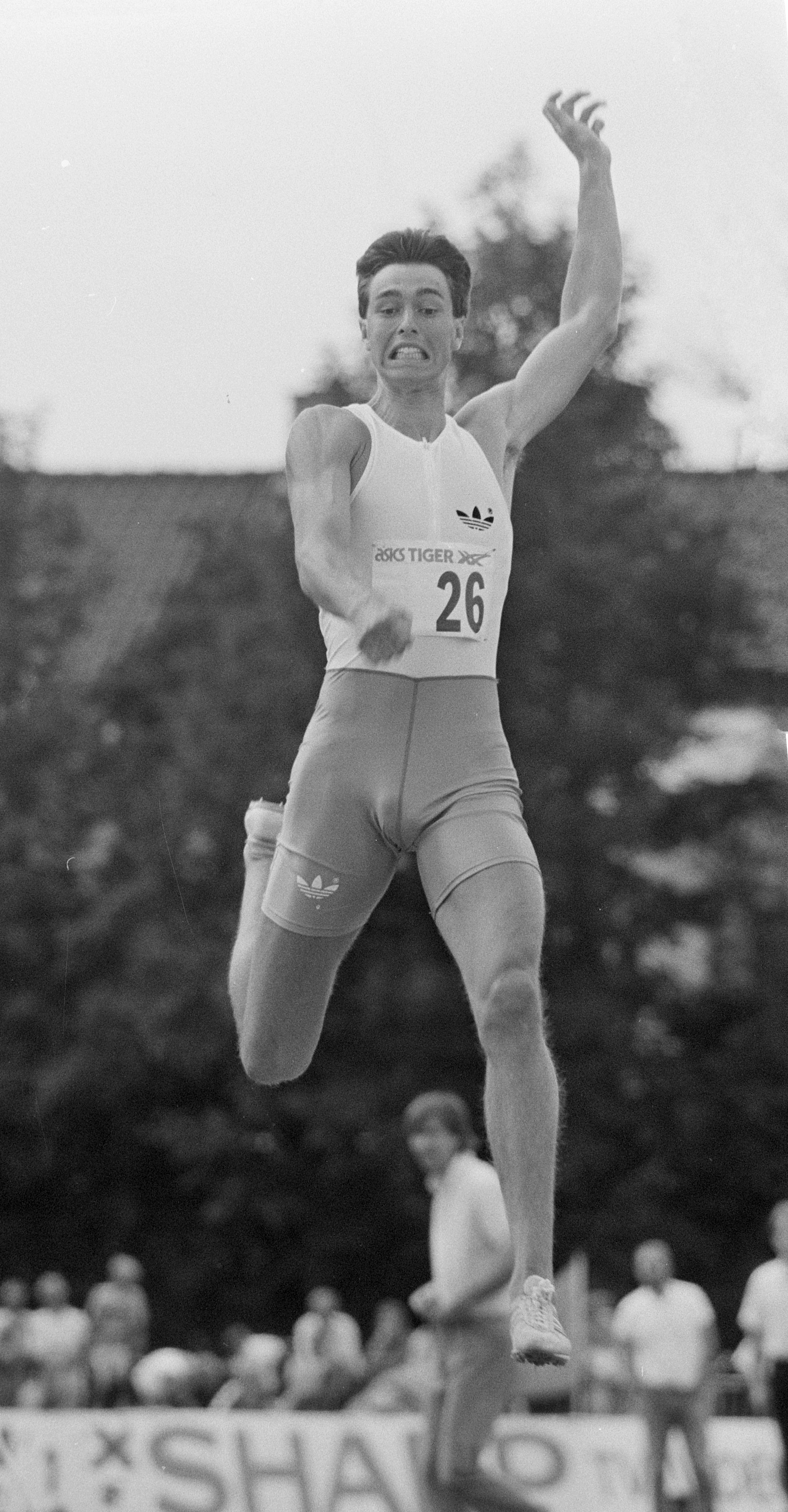
- Emiel Mellaard in 1987

Personal information
- Born: 21 March 1966 (age 60) Spijkenisse, Netherlands
- Height: 1.89 m (6 ft 2 in)
- Weight: 74 kg (163 lb)

Sport
- Sport: Long jump
- Club: Vlug en Lenig, Den Haag

Emiel Remco Mellaard (born 21 March 1966) is a retired Dutch long jumper, best known for winning the 1989 European Indoor Championships.

Mellaard was the first Dutch long jumper to break the 8-metre barrier, when in 1987 he jumped 8.02. With this achievement he took over Henk Visser's legendary Dutch record of 7.98, set in 1956.

His personal best was 8.19 metres, achieved in July 1988 in Groningen. This is the current Dutch record on outdoor tracks. However, Emiel Mellaard is one of the few athletes who produced his very best performance on an indoor track. In 1989 he jumped 8.23 metres in The Hague, a few weeks before he would become European Indoor Champion. This achievement remains the current Dutch indoor record.

== International competitions ==
Year	Competition	Venue	Position	Notes
Representing the Netherlands
1985	World Indoor Games	Paris, France	5th	7.78 m
1985	European Junior Championships	Cottbus, East Germany	3rd	7.79 m
1986	European Championships	Stuttgart, West Germany	4th	7.91 m
1987	European Indoor Championships	Liévin, France	12th	7.62 m
1987	World Championships	Rome, Italy	18th (q)	7.93 m
1988	European Indoor Championships	Budapest, Hungary	4th	7.84 m
1988	Olympic Games	Seoul, South Korea	11th	7.71 m
1989	European Indoor Championships	The Hague, Netherlands	1st	8.14 m
1989	World Indoor Championships	Budapest, Hungary	16th (q)	7.42 m
1989	World Cup	Barcelona, Spain	4th	7.82 m^{1}
1990	European Indoor Championships	Glasgow, United Kingdom	2nd	8.08 m
1992	European Indoor Championships	Genoa, Italy	6th	7.89 m
1993	World Indoor Championships	Toronto, Canada	10th	6.77 m

^{1}Representing Europe

Awards
Preceded by Robert de Wit	Herman van Leeuwen Cup; 1989	Succeeded by Erik de Bruin
