= Frans Maas =

Dutch long jumper

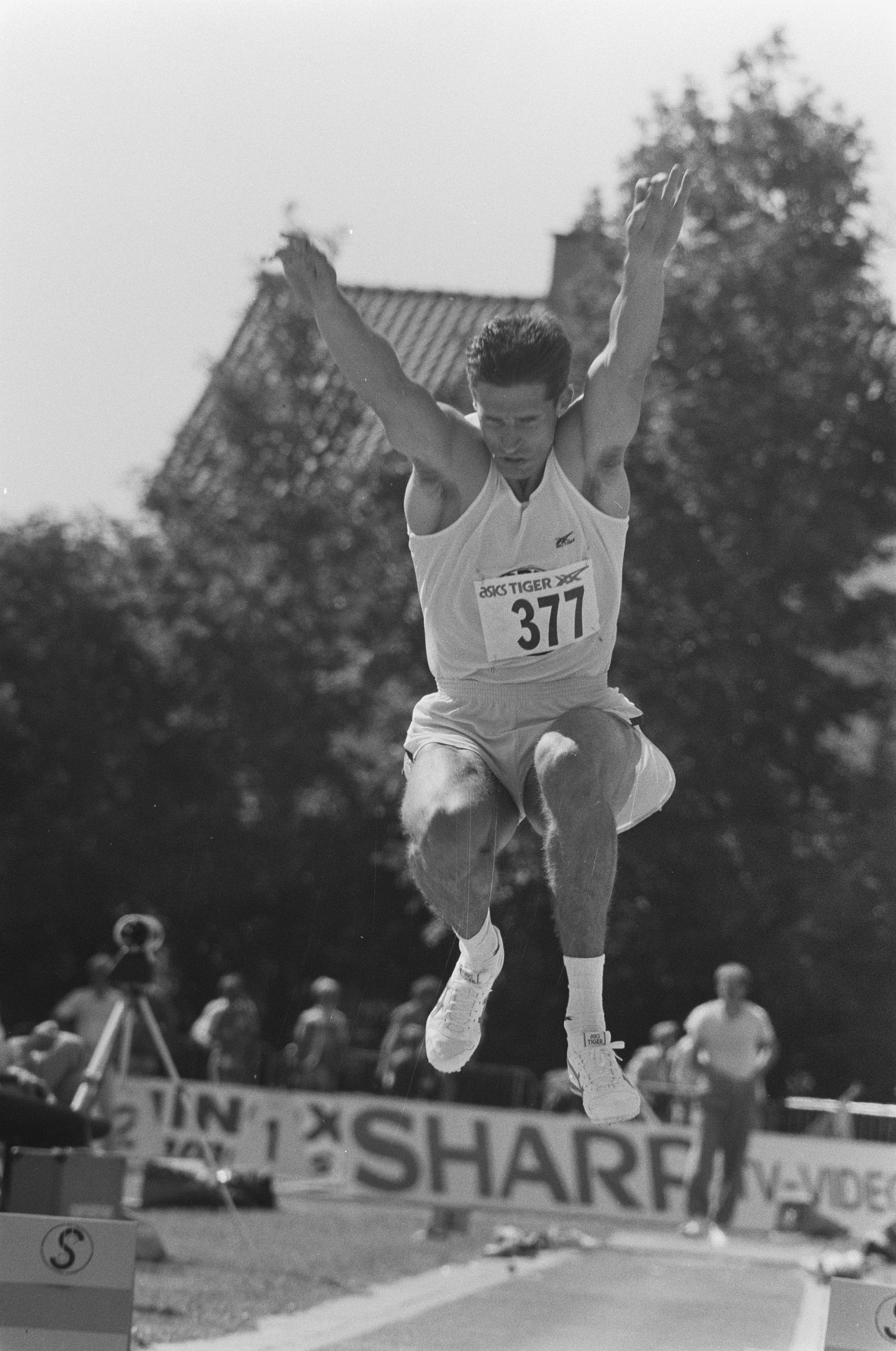
Frans Maas in 1987

Frans Maas (born 13 July 1964, in Bergen op Zoom) is a retired Dutch long jumper, best known for his gold medal at the 1988 European Indoor Championships.

Maas attended the University of Texas at El Paso where he studied marketing. He was an All-American jumper for the UTEP Miners track and field team, placing 5th in the long jump at the 1986 NCAA Division I Indoor Track and Field Championships.

== International competitions ==
| Year | Competition | Venue | Position | Notes |
Representing the Netherlands
| 1983 | European Junior Championships | Schwechat, Austria | 13th (q) | 7.21 m |
| 1987 | World Indoor Championships | Indianapolis, United States | 8th | 7.84 m |
| 1987 | World Championships | Rome, Italy | 21st (q) | 7.78 m |
| 1988 | European Indoor Championships | Budapest, Hungary | 1st | 8.06 m |
| 1989 | European Indoor Championships | The Hague, Netherlands | 3rd | 8.11 m |
| 1989 | World Indoor Championships | Budapest, Hungary | 8th | 7.83 m |
| 1990 | European Indoor Championships | Glasgow, United Kingdom | 12th | 7.65 m |
| 1990 | European Championships | Split, Yugoslavia | 4th | 8.00 m |
| 1991 | World Indoor Championships | Seville, Spain | 21st (q) | 7.45 m |
| 1991 | World Championships | Tokyo, Japan | 27th (q) | 7.71 m |
| 1992 | European Indoor Championships | Genoa, Italy | 23rd | 7.36 m |
| 1993 | World Indoor Championships | Toronto, Canada | 4th | 7.96 m |
| 1993 | World Championships | Stuttgart, Germany | 41st (q) | 7.26 m |
| 1994 | European Indoor Championships | Paris, France | 14th | 7.46 m |
| 1994 | European Championships | Helsinki, Finland | 27th (q) | 7.53 m |
| 1995 | World Indoor Championships | Barcelona, Spain | 15th (q) | 7.70 m |
