= Andrey Ignatov =

Russian long jumper

Andrey Ignatov (Russian: Андрей Игнатов; born 3 February 1968) is a retired Russian long jumper. His personal best jump was 8.34 metres, achieved in June 1995 in Moscow.

== International competitions ==
Representing Russia
Year	Competition	Venue	Position	Event	Notes
1994	European Championships	Helsinki, Finland	30th (q)	Long jump	7.42 m (wind: +0.8 m/s)
1995	Military World Games	Rome, Italy	2nd	Long jump	8.00 m
1995	World Championships	Gothenburg, Sweden	9th	Long jump	7.93 m
1996	Olympic Games	Atlanta, United States	11th	Long jump	7.83 m
