= Galin Georgiev =

Bulgarian triple jumper

Galin Georgiev (Bulgarian: Галин Георгиев; born 23 March 1970) is a retired Bulgarian triple jumper, best known for placing seventh at the 1996 Summer Olympics.

His personal best triple jump was 17.14 metres, achieved in May 1998 in Sofia. This ranks him fifth among Bulgarian triple jumpers, behind Khristo Markov, Rostislav Dimitrov, Momchil Karailiev and Nikolay Raev. His personal best long jump was 8.20 metres, achieved in June 1992 in Sofia. This ranks him sixth among Bulgarian long jumpers, behind Ivaylo Mladenov, Atanas Atanasov, Nikolay Atanasov, Petar Dachev and Nikolay Antonov.

== Achievements ==
| Year | Competition | Venue | Position | Event | Notes |
Representing Bulgaria
| 1988 | World Junior Championships | Sudbury, Canada | 2nd | Triple jump | 16.18 m (wind: +1.8 m/s) |
| 1992 | European Indoor Championships | Genoa, Italy | 7th | Triple jump | 16.62 m |
| 1992 | Olympic Games | Barcelona, Spain | — | Triple jump | DNF |
| 1995 | World Indoor Championships | Barcelona, Spain | 9th | Long jump | 7.81 m |
| 1995 | World Championships | Gothenburg, Sweden | 13th | Long jump | 7.72 m |
| 1995 | World Championships | Gothenburg, Sweden | 8th | Triple jump | 16.93 m |
| 1996 | European Indoor Championships | Stockholm, Sweden | 9th | Long jump | 7.64 m |
| 1996 | European Indoor Championships | Stockholm, Sweden | 11th | Triple jump | 16.18 m |
| 1996 | Olympic Games | Atlanta, United States | 7th | Triple jump | 16.92 m |
| 1998 | European Championships | Budapest, Hungary | — | Triple jump | NM |
