= Vadim Ivanov (long jumper) =

Soviet athlete

Personal information
- Nationality: Soviet
- Born: 8 October 1968 (age 57)

Sport
- Sport: Athletics
- Event: Long jump

Vadim Ivanov (born 8 October 1968) is a Soviet athlete. He competed in the men's long jump at the 1992 Summer Olympics.
