= Badara Mbengue =

Senegalese long jumper (born 1966)

Medal record

Men's athletics

Representing Senegal

African Championships
Silver medal – second place	1990 Cairo	Long jump
Bronze medal – third place	1989 Lagos	Long jump

Badara Mbengue (born 3 February 1966) is a retired Senegalese long jumper.

He finished fifth at the 1989 Jeux de la Francophonie, won the bronze medal at the 1989 African Championships and silver medal at the 1990 African Championships. He also competed at the 1987 and 1991 World Championships without reaching the final.

His personal best jump was 8.04 metres.
