= Cheikh Touré =

Senegal-born French athlete

Medal record

Men's athletics

Representing Senegal

African Championships
Silver medal – second place	1996 Yaoundé	Long jump

Cheikhou Tidiane Touré (born January 25, 1970) is a Senegal-born French athlete who specialised in the long jump. He retired after the 2003 season.

His best international performance came in the 1997 World Championships, where he finished 7th.

His personal best jump was 8.46 m, a result he achieved in Bad Langensalza on June 15, 1997. As this happened before he became a French national, the result was an African record which stood for over twelve years. Ignisious Gaisah of Ghana jumped 8.51 m at the 2006 African Championships in Athletics, but as the tail wind was too strong (+3.7 m/s) the result could not become a new record. On July 4, 2009, Godfrey Khotso Mokoena of South Africa jumped 8.50 m in Madrid, setting a new record.

== Competition record ==
Year	Competition	Venue	Position	Event	Notes
Representing Senegal
1988	World Junior Championships	Sudbury, Canada	33rd (q)	Long jump	6.49 m
1989	Jeux de la Francophonie	Casablanca, Morocco	7th	Long jump	7.48 m
1994	Jeux de la Francophonie	Bondoufle, France	6th	4 × 100 m relay	40.69 s
1994	Jeux de la Francophonie	Bondoufle, France	1st	Long jump	8.06 m
1995	World Indoor Championships	Barcelona, Spain	6th (q)	Long jump	7.86 m^{1}
1995	World Championships	Gothenburg, Sweden	18th (q)	Long jump	7.85 m
1995	All-Africa Games	Harare, Zimbabwe	1st	Long jump	8.10 m
1996	African Championships	Yaoundé, Cameroon	2nd	Long jump	7.79 m
1996	Olympic Games	Atlanta, United States	16th (q)	Long jump	7.91 m
1997	World Indoor Championships	Paris, France	13th (q)	Long jump	7.84 m
1997	World Championships	Athens, Greece	7th	Long jump	7.98 m
1997	Jeux de la Francophonie	Antananarivo, Madagascar	1st	Long jump	8.19 m
Representing France
1999	World Championships	Seville, Spain	23rd (q)	Long jump	7.76 m
2000	Olympic Games	Sydney, Australia	20th (q)	Long jump	7.87 m
2001	Mediterranean Games	Radès, Tunisia	6th	Long jump	7.76 m

^{1}No mark in the final
