= Dmitry Bagryanov =

Russian long jumper (1967–2015)

Dmitriy Bagryanov (Russian: Дмитрий Багрянов; 18 December 1967 – 4 February 2015) was a Russian long jumper, best known for his gold medal at the 1992 European Athletics Indoor Championships.

== International competitions ==
| Year | Competition | Venue | Position | Notes |
Representing the Soviet Union
| 1991 | World Indoor Championships | Seville, Spain | 7th | 7.82 m |
| 1991 | World Championships | Tokyo, Japan | – | NM |
Representing the Unified Team
| 1992 | European Indoor Championships | Genoa, Italy | 1st | 8.12 m |
| 1992 | Olympic Games | Barcelona, Spain | 7th | 7.98 m |
Representing Russia
| 1994 | European Indoor Championships | Paris, France | 6th | 8.01 m |
| 1994 | European Championships | Helsinki, Finland | 5th | 7.96 m (wind: -0.2 m/s) |
