= Sergey Layevskiy =

Medal record

Men's athletics

Representing Soviet Union

European Championships
| Silver medal – second place | 1986 Stuttgart | Long jump |

Sergey Layevskiy (Ukrainian: Сергіӣ Лаєвський; born 3 March 1959) is a retired long jumper who represented the USSR and later Ukraine. He won a bronze medal at the 1985 European Indoor Championships and a silver medal at the 1986 European Championships.

== Achievements ==
| Year | Competition | Venue | Position | Event | Notes |
Representing Soviet Union
| 1984 | Friendship Games | Moscow, Soviet Union | 3rd | Long jump | 8.22 m |
| 1985 | European Indoor Championships | Athens, Greece | 3rd | Long jump | 8.14 m |
| 1986 | European Championships | Stuttgart, West Germany | 2nd | Long jump | 8.01 m |
| 1987 | World Championships | Rome, Italy | 9th | Long jump | 8.08 m |
