= Ángel Hernández (long jumper) =

Spanish long jumper (born 1966)

Personal information
- Born: April 15, 1966 (age 60) Ávila, Spain

Sport
- Sport: Track and field
Medal record
Representing Spain
European Championships
Silver medal – second place	1990 Split	Long jump

Ángel Hernández Yáñez (born April 15, 1966) is a retired Spanish long jumper who won a silver medal at the 1990 European Championships, jumping 8.15 metres (26 feet 9 inches).

Hernández won the Spanish national championship in 1989, 1990, 1993 and 1994.

== Competition record ==
Year	Competition	Venue	Position	Notes
Representing Spain
1987	Universiade	Zagreb, Yugoslavia	26th (q)	7.17 m
1989	Universiade	Duisburg, West Germany	4th	7.82 m
1990	European Indoor Championships	Glasgow, United Kingdom	10th	7.76 m
1990	European Championships	Split, Yugoslavia	2nd	8.15 m
1990	Ibero-American Championships	Manaus, Brazil	2nd	7.75 m
1991	World Indoor Championships	Seville, Spain	10th	7.70 m
1991	World Championships	Tokyo, Japan	24th (q)	7.75 m
1992	European Indoor Championships	Genoa, Italy	17th	7.61 m
1992	Olympic Games	Barcelona, Spain	–	NM
1993	World Indoor Championships	Toronto, Canada	10th	7.66 m
1993	World Championships	Stuttgart, Germany	14th (q)	7.86 m
1994	European Indoor Championships	Paris, France	22nd (q)	7.65 m
1994	European Championships	Helsinki, Finland	16th (q)	7.73 m
1995	World Indoor Championships	Barcelona, Spain	22nd (q)	7.60 m
