= Dietmar Haaf =

German long jumper (born 1967)

Personal information
- Born: 6 March 1967 (age 59) Bad Cannstatt, West Germany
Medal record
Men's athletics
Representing West Germany
World Indoor Championships
Silver medal – second place	1989 Budapest	Long jump
European Championships
Gold medal – first place	1990 Split	Long jump
European Indoor Championships
Gold medal – first place	1990 Glasgow	Long jump
Representing Germany
World Indoor Championships
Gold medal – first place	1991 Sevilla	Long jump
European Indoor Championships
Gold medal – first place	1994 Paris	Long jump

Dietmar Haaf (born 6 March 1967 in Bad Cannstatt) is a former (West) German long jumper.

== Career ==
He won the gold medal at the 1990 European Championships in Split in a personal best jump of 8.25 metres. The following year he won the gold medal at the World Indoor Championships in Seville. He finished fourth at the 1991 World Championships in Athletics in Tokyo.

His personal best jump of 8.25 metres ranks him seventh among German long jumpers, behind Lutz Dombrowski, Frank Paschek, Josef Schwarz, Henry Lauterbach, Marco Delonge and Konstantin Krause.

Haaf retired in 1997.

== International competitions ==
Year	Competition	Venue	Position	Notes
Representing West Germany
1986	European Indoor Championships	Madrid, Spain	15th	7.48 m
1986	World Junior Championships	Athens, Greece	1st	7.93 m (wind: +0.7 m/s)
1986	European Championships	Stuttgart, West Germany	10th	7.48 m (wind: -1.1 m/s)
1987	World Championships	Rome, Italy	26th (q)	7.51 m
1988	European Indoor Championships	Budapest, Hungary	5th	7.79 m
1989	European Indoor Championships	The Hague, Netherlands	5th	7.96 m
1989	World Indoor Championships	Budapest, Hungary	2nd	8.17 m
1990	European Indoor Championships	Glasgow, United Kingdom	1st	8.11 m
1990	European Championships	Split, Yugoslavia	1st	8.25 m (wind: 0.0 m/s) PB
Representing Germany
1991	World Indoor Championships	Seville, Spain	1st	8.15 m
1991	World Championships	Tokyo, Japan	4th	8.22 m
1992	European Indoor Championships	Genoa, Italy	13th	7.69 m
1992	Olympic Games	Barcelona, Spain	14th (q)	7.85 m
1994	European Indoor Championships	Paris, France	1st	8.15 m
1994	European Championships	Helsinki, Finland	23rd (q)	7.55 m (wind: +0.3 m/s)

Note: Results with a Q, indicate overall position in qualifying round.
