= Christos Zachopoulos =

Greek politician

Christos Zachopoulos is the former general-secretary of the Ministry of Culture in Greece.

In December 2007, Zachopoulos made a suicide attempt after being forced to resign as a result of an alleged affair with a female archaeologist on his staff. The woman was charged with complicity in the attempted suicide.
