= 1990 European Athletics Championships – Men's long jump =

Men's long jump at the European Athletics Championships

These are the official results of the Men's long jump event at the 1990 European Championships in Split, Yugoslavia, held at Stadion Poljud on 29 and 30 August 1990. There were a total number of 22 participating athletes.

== Medalists ==
Gold	Dietmar Haaf; West Germany (FRG)
Silver	Ángel Hernández; Spain (ESP)
Bronze	(Socialist Federal Republic of Yugoslavia) Borut Bilač; Yugoslavia (YUG)

== Results ==
=== Final ===
30 August

Rank	Name	Nationality	Result	Notes
1st place, gold medalist(s)	Dietmar Haaf	West Germany	8.25 (w: 0.0 m/s)	
2nd place, silver medalist(s)	Ángel Hernández	Spain	8.15 (w: 0.0 m/s)	
3rd place, bronze medalist(s)	Borut Bilač^{†}	Yugoslavia	8.09 (w: 0.0 m/s)	
4	Frans Maas	Netherlands	8.00 (w: 0.0 m/s)	
5	Vladimir Ratushkov	Soviet Union	7.99 (w: 0.0 m/s)	
6	Jarmo Kärnä	Finland	7.95 (w: 0.0 m/s)	
7	Giovanni Evangelisti	Italy	7.93 (w: 0.0 m/s)	
8	Bogdan Tudor	Romania	7.86 (w: 0.0 m/s)	
9	Siniša Ergotić	Yugoslavia	7.83 (w: 0.0 m/s)	
10	Konstadinos Koukodimos	Greece	7.79 (w: -0.4 m/s)	
11	Mark Forsythe	United Kingdom	7.79 (w: 0.0 m/s)	
12	Christian Thomas	West Germany	7.74 (w: 0.0 m/s)	

^{†}: Bronze medalist Borut Bilač from Yugoslavia was initially disqualified for a suspected infringement of IAAF doping rules, but was later cleared of the charges and reinstated.

=== Qualification ===
29 August

==== Group A ====
Rank	Name	Nationality	Result	Notes
1	Siniša Ergotić	Yugoslavia	7.99 w (w: 2.4 m/s)	Q
2	Mark Forsythe	United Kingdom	7.91 (w: 1.4 m/s)	Q
3	Christian Thomas	West Germany	7.90 (w: 1.5 m/s)	Q
4	Konstadinos Koukodimos	Greece	7.90 w (w: 2.2 m/s)	Q
5	André Müller	East Germany	7.85 (w: 1.4 m/s)	
6	Juha Kivi	Finland	7.70 (w: -1.8 m/s)	
7	Jean-Louis Rapnouil	France	7.68 (w: 1.7 m/s)	
8	Fausto Frigerio	Italy	7.62 (w: 1.3 m/s)	
9	Milko Campus	Italy	7.57 (w: 1.8 m/s)	
	Robert Emmiyan	Soviet Union	NM	
	Nenad Stekić	Yugoslavia	NM	

==== Group B ====
Rank	Name	Nationality	Result	Notes
1	Jarmo Kärnä	Finland	8.13 (w: 1.6 m/s)	Q
2	Frans Maas	Netherlands	8.04 (w: 1.3 m/s)	Q
3	Dietmar Haaf	West Germany	8.04 (w: 0.6 m/s)	Q
4	Borut Bilač	Yugoslavia	8.02 (w: 1.1 m/s)	Q
5	Bogdan Tudor	Romania	8.02 (w: 1.8 m/s)	Q
6	Ángel Hernández	Spain	8.00 (w: 1.5 m/s)	Q
7	Vladimir Ratushkov	Soviet Union	7.93 (w: 1.1 m/s)	Q
8	Giovanni Evangelisti	Italy	7.91 (w: 0.9 m/s)	Q
9	Stewart Faulkner	United Kingdom	7.48 w (w: 2.4 m/s)	
10	Daniel Ivanov	Bulgaria	7.41 (w: 1.5 m/s)	
11	Carlos Castelbranco	Portugal	6.96 (w: -0.3 m/s)	

== Participation ==
According to an unofficial count, 22 athletes from 14 countries participated in the event.

- Bulgaria (1)
- East Germany (1)
- Finland (2)
- France (1)
- Greece (1)
- Italy (3)
- Netherlands (1)
- Portugal (1)
- Romania (1)
- Soviet Union (2)
- Spain (1)
- United Kingdom (2)
- West Germany (2)
- Yugoslavia (3)

== See also ==
- 1988 Men's Olympic Long Jump (Seoul)
- 1991 Men's World Championships Long Jump (Tokyo)
- 1992 Men's Olympic Long Jump (Barcelona)
- 1994 Men's European Championships Long Jump (Helsinki)
