= Franck Lestage =

French long jumper

Personal information
- Nationality: French
- Born: 20 April 1968 (age 58) Saint-Germain-en-Laye, France

Sport
- Sport: Athletics
- Event: Long jump

Franck Lestage (born 20 April 1968) is a French athlete. He competed in the men's long jump at the 1992 Summer Olympics.
