= Mike Powell (long jumper) =

Athletics competitor, long jumper

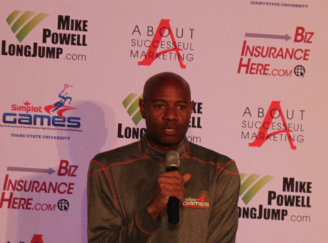
- Powell announces at a press conference that he will attempt to break the World Masters record

Personal information
- Full name: Michael Anthony Powell
- Born: November 10, 1963 (age 63) Philadelphia, Pennsylvania, U.S.
- Home town: West Covina, California, U.S.
- Height: 6 ft 2 in (188 cm)
- Weight: 170 lb (77 kg)

Sport
- Country: United States
- Sport: Track and field
- Event: Long jump
- Coached by: Randy Huntington

Achievements and titles
- Personal best: 8.95 m WR (Tokyo 1991)
Medal record
International athletics competitions
Event	1st	2nd	3rd
Olympic Games	0	2	0
World Championships	2	0	1
Total	2	2	1
Men's athletics
Representing the United States
Olympic Games
Silver medal – second place	1988 Seoul	Long jump
Silver medal – second place	1992 Barcelona	Long jump
World Championships
Gold medal – first place	1991 Tokyo	Long jump
Gold medal – first place	1993 Stuttgart	Long jump
Bronze medal – third place	1995 Gothenburg	Long jump
Goodwill Games
Gold medal – first place	1994 St. Petersburg	Long jump
Silver medal – second place	1990 Seattle	Long jump
Summer Universiade
Gold medal – first place	1987 Zagreb	Long jump
- Updated on August 6, 2012

Michael Anthony Powell (born November 10, 1963) is an American former track and field athlete and holds the world record in the long jump. He set his world record of 8.95 m (29 ft 4 1/4 in) on August 30, 1991, to win the world championship. He is a two-time world champion as well as two-time Olympic silver medalist in the event.

== Biography ==
=== Background ===
Powell was born in Philadelphia, Pennsylvania. He attended Edgewood High School in West Covina, California. In high school, he cleared a height of 7 feet (2.13 m) in the high jump at the CIF California State Meet in 1981. He went to the University of California, Irvine and transferred to the University of California, Los Angeles. Since then, he is a member of the Alpha Phi Alpha fraternity.

=== Athletics career ===
Powell won the British AAA Championships title at the 1987 AAA Championships.

In 1988, Powell won the long jump silver medal at the Olympics in Seoul, South Korea.

At the 1991 World Championships in Athletics in Tokyo, Japan, on August 30, 1991, Powell broke Bob Beamon's almost 23-year-old long jump world record by 5 cm (2 in), leaping 8.95 m (29 ft 4 1/4 in). The world record stands, making it the longest-standing long jump world record since records have been kept. The feat earned him the James E. Sullivan Award and BBC Overseas Sports Personality of the Year Award in 1991.

He also holds the longest wind-assisted jump at 8.99 m (29 ft 5 3/4 in) (+4.4 m/s), set at high altitude in 1992 in Sestriere, Italy. He again won the long jump silver at the 1992 Olympics in Barcelona, Spain. At the 1993 World Championships in Stuttgart, Germany, he won the long jump for the second time, and was third at the 1995 World Championships in Gothenburg, Sweden.

After placing fifth in the long jump at the 1996 Olympics, Powell retired. He returned in 2001 with a goal of competing in the 2004 Olympics, but was not able to make the American team.

=== Other sports ===
During his professional career, Powell competed in the 1992–93 Foot Locker Slam Fest trying to dunk from the free throw line but failed. Mike Conley made a dunk from the free throw line and won the competition. Powell won the 1992 Superstars competition.

=== After retirement ===
Powell became an analyst for Yahoo! Sports Olympic Track & Field coverage. In July 2009, he announced that he would return to competition and planned to break Tapani Taavitsainen's Masters over-45 world record in the long jump.

At the Simplot Games in Pocatello, Idaho on February 20, 2015, in an official announcement Powell said that he would jump again in competition. On March 7, 2015, Powell entered the Athletics New Zealand Track and Field Championships in Wellington, New Zealand in an attempt to break the World Masters record. However, Powell sustained an injury in warm-ups and did not compete.

In July 2016, his daughter Micha Powell was named as an alternate to Canada's Olympic team for the Summer Olympic Games in Rio de Janeiro, Brazil. Her mother, Rosey Edeh, ran in the 400 meters hurdles final at the 1996 Olympics.

Powell had coached long jump at the Azusa Pacific University in California during the 2023 season. However, in 2025 he was suspended indefinitely by the Athletics Integrity Unit after a safeguarding concern, and is barred from all activities sanctioned by World Athletics.

Records
Preceded by (United States) Bob Beamon	Men's Long Jump World Record Holder; August 30, 1991 – present	Incumbent
Achievements
Preceded by (United States) Larry Myricks	Men's Long Jump Best Year Performance; 1990–1991	Succeeded by (United States) Carl Lewis
Preceded by (United States) Carl Lewis	Men's Long Jump Best Year Performance; 1993	Succeeded by (United States) Erick Walder
Awards
Preceded by (Australia) Mal Meninga	BBC Overseas Sports Personality of the Year; 1991	Succeeded by (United States) Andre Agassi
