= Joe Greene (long jumper) =

American track and field athlete

Personal information
- Full name: Joseph Tilford Lee Greene
- Born: February 17, 1967 (age 59) Dayton, Ohio, U.S.

Sport
- Coached by: Randy Huntington
Medal record
Men's athletics
Representing United States
Olympic Games
Bronze medal – third place	1992 Barcelona	Long jump
Bronze medal – third place	1996 Atlanta	Long jump
World Indoor Championships
Silver medal – second place	1993 Toronto	Long jump
Bronze medal – third place	1997 Paris	Long jump

Joseph Tilford Lee Greene (born February 17, 1967, at Wright-Patterson Air Base, Dayton, Ohio) is an American track and field athlete who competed mainly in the long jump.

Greene attended Stebbins High School in Riverside, a suburb of Dayton, and Ohio State University.

He competed for the United States in the 1992 Summer Olympics held in Barcelona, Spain in the long jump where he won the bronze medal. He repeated this performance four years later winning a second bronze in the Men's long jump at the 1996 Summer Olympics held in Atlanta, United States. Both competitions were won by Carl Lewis.

In August 2008, Greene's 1996 Olympic bronze medal was available for auction on eBay. Both the 1996 Atlanta and 1992 Barcelona bronze medals were also briefly seen on the History Channel show Pawn Stars.
