= Borut Bilač =

Slovenian long jumper

Personal information
- Nationality: Slovenian
- Born: 14 April 1965 (age 61) Postojna, Yugoslavia

Sport
- Country: Slovenia
- Sport: athletics
- Event: long jump
Medal record
Men's athletics
Representing Yugoslavia
European Championships
Bronze medal – third place	1990 Split	Long jump

Borut Bilač (born 14 April 1965) is a retired Slovenian long jumper. Bilač won the bronze medal at the 1990 European Athletics Championships, representing Yugoslavia, and finished ninth at the 1992 Olympic Games representing Slovenia.

His personal best is 8.24 metres, achieved on 5 July 1990 in Cagliari, Italy.

Bilač began competing in athletics in primary school. He jumped 6.94 metres in the long jump and 2.02 metres in the high jump as a youth (U-18) athlete in 1982, that year's best U-18 performances in Yugoslavia. He won the Yugoslav national U18 title in the long jump that year with a jump of 6.87 metres. He won his first international medal at the 1984 Junior Balkan Games in Maribor, taking bronze with a jump of 7.24 metres. He broke the Slovenian record for the first time at an international meeting in Nova Gorica in 1988 with a jump of 7.66 metres. In 1989 he won his first Yugoslav Cup title with a 7.95 metres jump in Split.

He began the 1990 season with a 7.42 metres performance at the European Indoor Championships in Glasgow, where he didn't qualify for the final, but his finest season outdoors followed. He jumped beyond the eight-metre barrier for the first time and collected victories at international meetings in Caorle, Italy (8.03 metres), Verona, Italy (8.12 metres) and Cagliari, Italy, where he jumped 8.24 metres, the last of his six Slovenian records. He capped the season with a third-place finish at the European Athletics Championships in Split, Croatia, with a jump of 8.09 metres.

He represented Yugoslavia for the final time at the 1991 World Athletics Championships in Tokyo but did qualify for the final. He competed for now-independent Slovenia at the 1992 Olympic Games in Barcelona, qualifying for the final with a leap of 8.00 metres. He finished ninth in the final with a best leap of 7.76 metres.

Struggles with injuries followed until his retirement in 1998. His Slovenian national record in the long jump stood until 18 May 1997, when Gregor Cankar jumped 8.40 metres in Celje, Slovenia.

== Personal ==
Bilač and high jumper Britta Vörös, the 1994 European champion in the high jump, were married in 1990 and divorced in 2010.
