= Daniel Ivanov (long jumper) =

Bulgarian long jumper

Daniel Ivanov (Bulgarian: Даниел Иванов; born 4 November 1965) is a retired Bulgarian long jumper.

He became Bulgarian champion in 1989, and Bulgarian indoor champion in 1989, 1990 and 1993. He competed at the 1990 European Championships without reaching the final.
