= Mark Forsythe =

Northern Irish athlete (born 1965)

Personal information
- Nationality: Northern Irish
- Born: 10 August 1965 (age 60) Belfast, Northern Ireland
- Height: 183 cm (6 ft 0 in)
- Weight: 77 kg (170 lb)

Sport
- Sport: Athletics
- Event: Long Jump
- Club: Ballymena & Antrim

Mark Clifford Forsythe (born 10 August 1965) is a Northern Irish former athlete who competed in the men's long jump event during his career. He twice represented Great Britain at the Summer Olympics: 1988 and 1992.

== Biography ==
Forsythe who was born in Belfast, was affiliated with Ballymena & Antrim.

Forsythe finished third behind David Culbert and Thomas Ganda at the 1992 AAA Championships but by virtue of being the highest placed British athlete was considered the British long jump champion.

Following his athletics career, Forsythe worked for BBC Northern Ireland as a presenter and reporter. He went on to join Sky in 1995, and worked for Sky Sports as an executive producer, and later as production workflow manager.

== International competitions ==
Year	Competition	Venue	Position	Notes
Great Britain / Northern Ireland
1988	Olympic Games	Seoul, South Korea	12th	7.54 m (7.77)
1990	Commonwealth Games	Auckland, New Zealand	16th	7.46 m
1990	European Championships	Split, Yugoslavia	11th	7.79 m (7.91)
1991	World Championships	Tokyo, Japan	16th (q)	7.95 m
1992	European Indoor Championships	Genoa, Italy	8th	7.76 m
1992	Olympic Games	Barcelona, Spain	22nd (q)	7.71 m

- (#) Results in parentheses indicate distance achieved in qualifying round.
- (q) Indicates overall position achieved in qualifying round.
