= Csaba Almási =

Hungarian long jumper (born 1966)

Personal information
- Born: 4 July 1966 (age 60) Miskolc, Hungary

Sport
- Sport: Track and field

Csaba Almási (born 4 July 1966) is a retired Hungarian long jumper.

He was born in Miskolc. He finished fifteenth at the 1989 European Indoor Championships and twelfth at the 1989 World Indoor Championships. He also competed at the 1991 World Indoor Championships, the 1991 World Championships, the 1992 Olympic Games and the 1994 European Championships without reaching the final. He became Hungarian long jump champion in 1989, 1991 and 1992. He also became indoor champion in 1991 and 1992.

His personal best jump was 8.14 metres, achieved in August 1989 in West Berlin.

Csaba Almási stands 1.76 m (5 ft 9 in) tall, and during his active career he weighed 68 kilograms (150 lb).
