= Chen Zunrong =

Chinese long jumper

Personal information
- Born: October 20, 1962 (age 63) Quanzhou, China

Sport
- Sport: Track and field
Medal record
Representing China
Asian Games
Gold medal – first place	1990 Beijing	Long jump
Bronze medal – third place	1986 Seoul	Long jump
Asian Championships
Gold medal – first place	1991 Kuala Lumpur	Long jump
Silver medal – second place	1989 New Delhi	Long jump

Chen Zunrong (simplified Chinese: 陈尊荣; traditional Chinese: 陳尊榮; pinyin: Chén Zūnróng; born October 20, 1962) is a retired Chinese long jumper, best known for finishing tenth at the 1992 Olympic Games. His personal best is 8.36 metres, achieved in May 1992 in Shizuoka.

== Achievements ==
Year	Competition	Venue	Result	Notes
1986	Asian Games	Seoul, South Korea	3rd	
1989	Asian Championships	New Delhi, India	2nd	
1990	Asian Games	Beijing, China	1st	
1991	World Championships	Tokyo, Japan	11th	
1991	Asian Championships	Kuala Lumpur, Malaysia	1st	8.10m CR
1992	Olympic Games	Barcelona, Spain	10th	
