= Elmer Williams =

Puerto Rican long jumper

Personal information
- Nationality: Puerto Rican
- Born: October 8, 1964 (age 61) Naguabo, Puerto Rico
- Height: 6 ft 3 in (191 cm)
- Weight: 185 lb (84 kg)

Sport
- Sport: Athletics
- Event: Long jump
Medal record
Representing Puerto Rico
Pan American Games
| Bronze medal – third place | 1995 Mar del Plata | Long jump |
Central American and Caribbean Games
| Silver medal – second place | 1986 Santiago | Long jump |
| Silver medal – second place | 1990 Mexico City | Long jump |

Elmer Williams González (born October 8, 1964 in Naguabo, Puerto Rico) is a retired Puerto Rican long jumper.

He won the silver medal at the 1986 Central American and Caribbean Games and the bronze medal at the 1995 Pan American Games. At the Central American and Caribbean Championships he won bronze medals in 1985 and 1989, and then three consecutive gold medals in 1991, 1993 and 1995. Williams was the first Puerto Rican athlete to jump over 26 feet in Puerto Rico.

He competed in the 1992 Olympic Games as well as the World Championships in 1993 and 1995, without reaching the final. He also finished fourth in the 1985 World University Games in Kobe, Japan. He won the silver medal at the Americas Cup in 1989, which is when he set the Puerto Rico National Long Jump record. In 1992 he won the bronze medal in Ibero-American Championships in Athletics in Seville, Spain. He was inducted into the Puerto Rican Sports Hall of fame in October 2011. His personal best jump was 8.19 metres, achieved in August 1989 in Bogotá. Elmer William has a Master’s Degree Physical Education from Universidad Metropolitana. Hes also been a Physical Education Professor and the Athletic Director in the University of Puerto Rico at Humacao. He was a representative of the public interest within the Puerto Rico Athletics Federation.
