= Stanislav Tarasenko =

Russian long jumper

Personal information
- Full name: Stanislav Vasilyevich Tarasenko
- Born: July 23, 1966 (age 59) Taganrog, Soviet Union

Sport
- Country: Russia
- Sport: Men's athletics
Medal record
World Championships
Silver medal – second place	1993 Stuttgart	Long Jump

Stanislav Vasilyevich Tarasenko (Russian: Станисла́в Васи́льевич Тарасе́нко; born July 23, 1966, in Zhukov, Rostov-na-Donu) is a retired long jumper from Russia, best known for winning the silver medal in the men's long jump event at the 1993 World Championships in Stuttgart, Germany.
