= Robert Emmiyan =

Soviet long jumper from Armenia

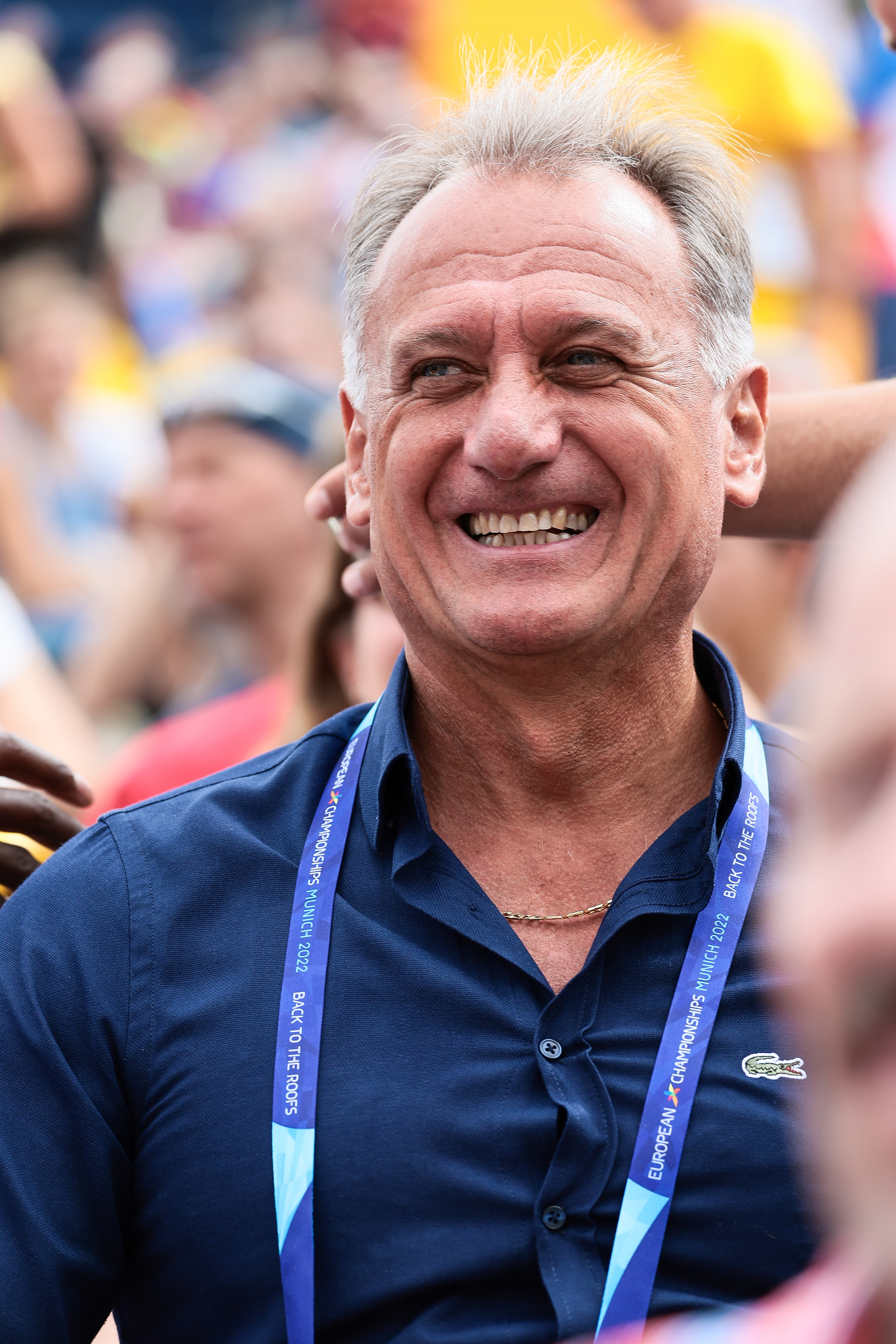
- Robert Emmiyan in 2022

Personal information
- Born: 15 February 1965 (age 61) Leninakan (Gyumri), Armenian SSR, Soviet Union
- Height: 1.78 m (5 ft 10 in)
- Weight: 69 kg (152 lb)

Sport
- Sport: Long jump
- Club: Spartak Gyumri
Medal record
Representing Soviet Union
World Championships
Silver medal – second place	1987 Rome	Long jump
European Championships
Gold medal – first place	1986 Stuttgart	Long jump
European Indoor Championships
Gold medal – first place	1986 Madrid	Long jump
Gold medal – first place	1987 Liévin	Long jump
Bronze medal – third place	1984 Göteborg	Long jump
Bronze medal – third place	1990 Glasgow	Long jump
World Cup
Silver medal – second place	1985 Canberra	Long jump
European Cup
Gold medal – first place	1987 Prague	Long jump
Silver medal – second place	1991 Frankfurt	Long jump
Universiade
Silver medal – second place	1985 Kobe	Long jump
Goodwill Games
Gold medal – first place	1986 Moscow	Long jump
Bronze medal – third place	1990 Seattle	Long jump

Robert Emmiyan (Armenian: Ռոբերտ Էմմիյան; born 15 February 1965) is a retired long jumper who represented the USSR and Armenia. He is the fourth best long jumper in history. His personal best jump of 8.86 metres, which he achieved in Tsaghkadzor in May 1987, is the current European record.

Emmiyan received the Honoured Master of Sports of the USSR award in 1987.

An annual track and field meeting in Artashat, Armenia, has been held in his honour since 2001 – the Emmiyan Cup.

== Biography ==
At age 16, Robert Emmiyan jumped 7.77 meters, the best jump in the world for his age group.

Emmiyan started competing for the Soviet Union in athletics on an international level in 1981.

At the 1985 IAAF World Cup, Emmiyan came in second place.

In 1986, Emmiyan won the 1986 European Athletics Indoor Championships in Madrid with a jump of 8.32 meters.

Emmiyan won the gold medal at the 1986 European Championships with a jump of 8.41 metres, setting a new championship record. Teammate Sergey Layevskiy was the only other man to jump over eight metres, jumping 8.01m, in a dominant victory by Emmiyan.

The inaugural politically contested 1986 Goodwill Games in Moscow saw Emmiyan win the gold medal in the long jump and set a new European record – 8.61 meters.

Emmiyan had the longest jump of 1986.

In 1987, Emmiyan won the 1987 European Athletics Indoor Championships again, making it his second consecutive gold medal at the championships, and set a European record for the long jump indoors – 8.49 meters.

Emmiyan participated at the 1987 European Cup and came in first place. Emmiyan set the Cup's long jump record at 8.38 meters. This record was never surpassed and remained when the Cup became defunct in 2006.

On 22 May 1987, in the high land of Tsaghkadzor (1840 meters above sea level) Emmiyan jumped 8.86 meters. At that time, it was the second best jump ever, after a record jump of Bob Beamon (8.90 meters) in Mexico City in 1968. Later, only Michael Powell (8.95 meters) and Carl Lewis (8.87 meters) jumped farther than Emmiyan. Thus, Emmiyan's jump of 8.86 meters from 1988 is currently the fourth best jump of all time, the first 29-foot jump since Bob Beamon's 1968 world record, and is also the current European record.

Emmiyan won a silver medal with a score of 8.53 meters, finishing second behind Carl Lewis (8.67 meters) at the 1987 World Championships in Athletics in Rome.

Emmiyan was a big medal favorite for the 1988 Olympic Games in Seoul. However, he got injured in the qualifying rounds and was unable to continue.

At the end of that year in December, Emmiyan's hometown of Gyumri was hit by an earthquake that destroyed much of the city and claimed the lives of many people, including Emmiyan's father.

Emmiyan was still able to train and remain in good shape. He continued to jump over 8.20 and 8.30 meters. But the mental toll caused by the earthquake remained. Long jumping requires a great deal of focus and concentration. Emmiyan began to decline athletically and his goal of breaking the world record was fading. He claimed his life and career had "changed from what it had been before."

At the 1990 European Athletics Indoor Championships in Glasgow, Emmiyan won the bronze medal with a score of 8.06 meters.

Emmiyan's last major success came at the 1991 European Cup, where he came in second place.

In 1991, Emmiyan started competing for his now independent country of Armenia. At the 1996 Summer Olympics in Atlanta, with a jump of 7.76 meters he failed to qualify for the finals, finishing in 28th place. Emmiyan soon retired from competitions.

Emmiyan is now the President of the Armenian Athletic Federation as of April 2010. He also works as a coach at INSEP, where he coaches French athletes Jules Pommery and Erwan Konaté.

== Personal life ==
When the 1988 Armenian earthquake occurred on 7 December, Emmiyan's home in the town of Gyumri was heavily damaged. His father was killed and other members of his family also perished. Emmiyan suffered psychological problems following the earthquake which weakened his mentality for long jumping.

Some time after his career ended, Emmiyan moved to Paris, France. Emmiyan married a woman from the Armenian community and with her has two daughters, Fiona and Lauren. His family speak Armenian at home and one day, Emmiyan hopes to return to Armenia. It is difficult for him to live away from his homeland, but he has more time to contribute to the development of athletics in Armenia from afar.

== Achievements ==
Year	Competition	Venue	Position	Notes
Representing the Soviet Union
1984	European Indoor Championships	Gothenburg, Sweden	3rd	7.89
1985	Summer Universiade	Kobe, Japan	2nd	8.03
1985	World Cup	Canberra, Australia	2nd	8.09
1986	European Indoor Championships	Madrid, Spain	1st	8.32 CR
1986	Goodwill Games	Moscow, Soviet Union	1st	8.61 CR
1986	European Championships	Stuttgart, West Germany	1st	8.41 m (wind: 0.0 m/s) CR
1987	European Indoor Championships	Liévin, France	1st	8.49 CR
1987	World Indoor Championships	Indianapolis, United States	4th	8.00
1987	World Championships	Rome, Italy	2nd	8.53
1987	European Cup	Prague, Czechoslovakia	1st	8.38 CR
1988	Summer Olympics	Seoul, South Korea	–	DNF
1990	European Indoor Championships	Glasgow, Scotland	3rd	8.06
1990	European Championships	Split, Yugoslavia	—	NM
1990	Goodwill Games	Seattle, United States	3rd	8.23
1991	European Cup	Frankfurt, Germany	2nd	8.01
1991	World Championships	Tokyo, Japan	14th	8.00
Representing Armenia
1993	World Championships	Stuttgart, Germany	23rd	7.66
1994	European Championships	Helsinki, Finland	18th	7.69 m (wind: +0.8 m/s)
1995	World Championships	Gothenburg, Sweden	11th	7.77
1996	Summer Olympics	Atlanta, United States	28th	7.76

== See also ==
- Armenian records in athletics

Records
Preceded by (East Germany) Lutz Dombrowski	Men's Long jump European Record Holder; 22 May 1981 –	Succeeded by Incumbent
