= Vitaliy Kyrylenko =

Ukrainian long jumper

Personal information
- Born: April 25, 1968 (age 58) Kharkiv, Soviet Union
Medal record
Men's Athletics
Representing Ukraine
World Championships
Bronze medal – third place	1993 Stuttgart	Long jump
Summer Universiade
Bronze medal – third place	1993 Buffalo	Long jump

Vitaliy Kyrylenko (Ukrainian: Віталій Кириленко, also known as Russian: Виталий Кириленко, Vitaliy Kirilenko; April 25, 1968) is a retired long jumper from Ukraine, best known for winning the bronze medal in the men's long jump event at the 1993 World Championships in Stuttgart, Germany.
