= Dave Culbert =

Australian long jumper

David Culbert
Personal information
- Nationality: Australian
- Born: 17 March 1967 (age 59)

Sport
- Sport: Track and field
- Event: Long jump
Medal record
Men's athletics
Representing Australia
Commonwealth Games
Silver medal – second place	1990 Auckland	Men's long jump
Silver medal – second place	1994 Victoria BC	Men's long jump

David Thomas Culbert (born 17 March 1967 in Sydney) is a former international track and field athlete. In an international long jump career that spanned ten years, he won two Commonwealth Games silver medals in 1990 and 1994 and also made finals at the 1992 Olympics.

Culbert won the British AAA Championships title at the 1992 AAA Championships.

Since his retirement, he has established himself as Australia's track and field commentator working with Channel 7 and SBS as well as various radio stations. In 2004 and 2005 he hosted a Sunday morning discussion show, The Insiders on Melbourne station SEN 1116.

In his role as a commentator, he has called Athletics at the 2000, 2004 and 2008 Olympic Games, 1998 and 2002 and 2006 Commonwealth Games and the past five World Athletics Championships.

He has also held the role of reporter/producer on Channel Seven programs Talking Footy, The Olympic Show and Sportsworld.

Culbert runs a sports media, promotion and marketing firm called Jump Media and has clients including Athletics Australia and the Australian Commonwealth Games Association.

He has worked on projects for Hockey Australia, the International Triathlon Union and Gymnastics Australia.
