= Ian James (athlete) =

Canadian long jumper (born 1963)

Personal information
- Born: July 17, 1963 (age 62) Port of Spain, Trinidad and Tobago

Sport
- Sport: Track and field
Medal record
Representing Canada
Commonwealth Games
Bronze medal – third place	1994 Victoria	Long jump

Ian Hugh James (born July 17, 1963) is a former long jumper, born in Port of Spain, Trinidad and Tobago, who represented Canada in two consecutive Summer Olympics, starting in 1988 in Seoul, South Korea. A resident of Mississauga, Ontario, he won the bronze medal in the men's long jump at the 1994 Commonwealth Games.

James competed for the Texas A&M Aggies track and field team in the NCAA. He later became director of community services in Williams Lake, British Columbia.
