= Ivaylo Mladenov =

Bulgarian long jumper

Medal record

Men's athletics

Representing Bulgaria

European Championships
Gold medal – first place	1994 Helsinki	Long jump

Ivaylo Petkov Mladenov (Bulgarian: Ивайло Петков Младенов; born 6 October 1973) is a retired Bulgarian long jumper, best known for his gold medal at the 1994 European Championships.

He was born in Vratsa and represented the club CSKA Sofia. He finished sixth at the 1991 European Junior Championships and wn the bronze medal at the 1992 World Junior Championships. He finished sixth at the 1993 World Indoor Championships, fifth at the 1993 World Championships, and second at the 1993 Grand Prix Final. In 1994 he finished fourth at the European Indoor Championships and won the European Championships.

He then finished eighth at both the 1995 World Championships and the 1995 Grand Prix Final. At the 1995 Military World Games he took a bronze medal. He did not reach the final at the 1995 World Indoor Championships or the 1996 Olympic Games. At the 1996 European Indoor Championships he qualified for the final, but did not start that. He competed at the 1999 World Championships without reaching the final.

He became Bulgarian champion in 1993 and 1994. His personal best jump was 8.33 metres, achieved in June 1995 in Seville. This is the Bulgarian record.
