= Jesús Oliván =

Spanish long jumper

Personal information
- Born: 5 July 1968 (age 58) Aranjuez, Spain

Sport
- Sport: Track and field

Jesús Oliván Mallén (born 5 July 1968) is a retired Spanish long jumper.

He was born in Aranjuez. He finished eighth at the 1986 European Indoor Championships and fifteenth at the 1992 European Indoor Championships He also competed at the 1991 World Indoor Championships, the 1991 World Championships, the 1992 Olympic Games and the 1996 Olympic Games without reaching the final.

He became Spanish long jump champion in 1991, 1995 and 1996, rivalling with Antonio Corgos and Ángel Hernández. He also became indoor champion in 1991, 1994 and 1996. His personal best jump was 8.12 metres, achieved in August 1991 in Vigo.

Oliván stands 1.90 m (6 ft 3 in) tall, and during his active career he weighed 78 kilograms (172 lb).
