= Konstandinos Koukodimos =

Greek long jumper-politician

Konstandinos Koukodimos Κώστας Κουκοδήμος
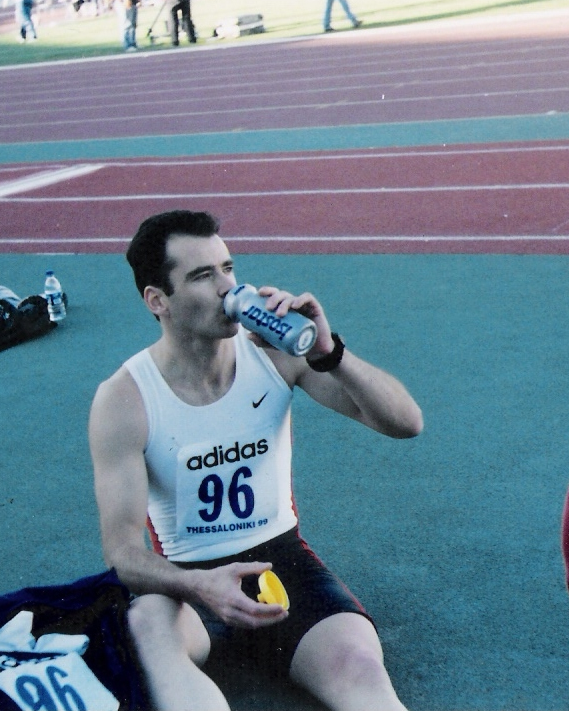
- Kostas Koukodimos as an athlete (1999)

Mayor of Katerini
- In office 1 September 2019 – 31 December 2023
- Preceded by: Savvas Chionidis
- Succeeded by: Ioannis Ntoumos

Personal details
- Born: 14 September 1969 (age 56) Melbourne, Australia
- Party: New Democracy
- Sports career
Medal record
Men's athletics
Representing Greece
European Athletics Championships
Bronze medal – third place	1994 Helsinki	Long jump
European Athletics Indoor Championships
Silver medal – second place	1994 Paris	Long jump
Mediterranean Games
Gold medal – first place	1991 Athens	Long jump

Konstandinos "Kostas" Koukodimos (Greek: Κωνσταντίνος "Κώστας" Κουκοδήμος, born 14 September 1969 in Melbourne) is a retired Greek long jumper and New Democracy politician, who served as the mayor of Katerini, Macedonia from 2019 to 2023. He was named the 1991 Greek Male Athlete of the Year. His family has hails from Agios Dimitrios, Pieria.

Koukodimos, who was raised in Pieria, Central Macedonia, is best known for his bronze medal at the 1994 European Championships. His personal best is 8.36 metres, achieved in June 1994 in Khania.

He is also a politician and former member of the Hellenic Parliament, elected for New Democracy in the Pieria constituency in 2007. In January 2008, the journalist Makis Triantafyllopoulos revealed that Koukodimos was calling him and other journalists of the Proto Thema newspaper to cover the Christos Zachopoulos scandal. As a result, Koukodimos was forced to leave New Democracy's parliamentary group and participate in parliament as an independent. He returned to New Democracy's parliamentary team after six months.

He was re-elected to parliament in the elections of 2009, May 2012, June 2012, January 2015 and September 2015.

On 2 June 2019, he was elected mayor of Katerini, defeating the incumbent Savvas Chionidis with a majority of 54.44% in the second round of voting. He was sworn in on 31 August and his term, like that of all other Greek mayors, officially commenced on 1 September.

== International competitions ==
Year	Competition	Venue	Position	Notes
Representing Greece
1986	World Junior Championships	Athens, Greece	8th	7.58 m
1988	World Junior Championships	Sudbury, Canada	8th	7.42 m (wind: +1.2 m/s)
1990	European Championships	Split, Yugoslavia	9th	7.79 m (wind: -0.4 m/s)
1991	World Indoor Championships	Seville, Spain	4th	7.92 m
1991	World Championships	Tokyo, Japan	12th	7.92 m
1991	Mediterranean Games	Athens, Greece	1st	8.26 m
1992	European Indoor Championships	Genoa, Italy	12th	7.70 m
1992	Olympic Games	Barcelona, Spain	6th	8.04 m
1994	European Indoor Championships	Paris, France	2nd	8.09 m
1994	European Championships	Helsinki, Finland	3rd	8.01 m (wind: +0.2 m/s)
1995	World Championships	Gothenburg, Sweden	6th	8.00 m
1997	Mediterranean Games	Bari, Italy	2nd	7.95 m
1998	European Indoor Championships	Valencia, Spain	8th	7.74 m
