= Jarmo Kärnä =

Finnish long jumper

Jarmo Kalevi Kärnä (born 4 August 1958 in Valtimo) is a retired Finnish long jumper, best known for his bronze medal at the 1992 European Indoor Championships. His personal best was 8.16 metres, achieved in June 1989 in Riga. This mark tied (with Rainer Stenius) for the Finnish record until 2005, when it was eclipsed in the qualification round of the World Championships long jump by Tommi Evilä.

== Achievements ==
Year	Competition	Venue	Position	Notes
Representing Finland
1982	European Championships	Athens, Greece	16th (q)	7.70 m (wind: +0.7 m/s)
1987	World Championships	Rome, Italy	14th	7.83 m
1988	Olympic Games	Seoul, South Korea	10th	7.82 m
1990	European Championships	Split, Yugoslavia	5th	7.95 m (wind: 0.0 m/s)
1992	European Indoor Championships	Genoa, Italy	3rd	7.96 m
1994	European Championships	Helsinki, Finland	25th (q)	7.55 m (wind: +0.9 m/s)
