= Spyridon Vasdekis =

Greek long jumper (born 1970)

Personal information
- Born: 23 January 1970 (age 56) Volos, Greece
Medal record
Men's Athletics
Representing Greece
European Indoor Championships
Bronze medal – third place	1996 Stockholm	Long Jump
Mediterranean Games
Gold medal – first place	1993 Narbonne	Long jump

Spyridon "Spyros" Vasdekis (Greek: Σπυρίδων "Σπύρος" Βασδέκης, born 23 January 1970) is a retired Greek long jumper.

He won the gold medal at the 1993 Mediterranean Games, finished tenth at the 1993 World Championships, third at the 1996 European Indoor Championships and eighth at the 1997 IAAF World Indoor Championships.

His personal best jump is 8.19 metres (26 ft 10.4 in), achieved in July 1995 in Budapest. This ranks him seventh among Greek long jumpers of all time, behind Louis Tsatoumas, Miltiadis Tentoglou, Konstantinos Koukodimos, Dimitrios Filindras, Georgios Tsakonas & Dimitrios Serelis.

Spyros Vasdekis is the older brother of Olga Vasdeki.
