= Giovanni Evangelisti =

Italian long jumper

Personal information
- National team: Italy
- Born: 11 September 1961 (age 65) Rimini, Italy
- Height: 1.80 m (5 ft 11 in)
- Weight: 75 kg (165 lb)

Sport
- Sport: Athletics
- Event: Long jumper
- Club: G.S. Fiamme Oro
- Retired: 1994

Achievements and titles
- Personal best: Long jump: 8.43 m (1987)
Medal record
Men's athletics
Representing Italy
Event	1st	2nd	3rd
Olympic Games	0	0	1
World Indoor Championships	0	0	3
European Championships	0	0	1
European Indoor Championships	0	1	2
Mediterranean Games	0	0	1
European Cup	1	0	1
Total	1	1	9
European Championships
Bronze medal – third place	1986 Stuttgart	Long jump
European Indoor Championships
Bronze medal – third place	1982 Milan	Long jump

Giovanni Evangelisti (born 11 September 1961 in Rimini) is a retired long jumper from Italy. His greatest achievements were the Olympic bronze medal in 1984 and three World Indoor bronze medals. He finished fourth at the 1988 Olympics.

== Biography ==
Despite his records, he is best remembered for the scandal that occurred during the 1987 World Championships. In the long jump final, home officials gave a forged measurement for one of Evangelisti's jumps - recording it as 8.37m instead of 7.85m - which resulted in him winning the bronze medal.

Though initially successful, the scam was eventually exposed by Sandro Donati and others, resulting in Evangelisti relinquishing his medal. Larry Myricks of the United States was instated as the rightful bronze medalist nine months later.

He won 11 medals (nine of them bronze), at the International athletics competitions. His personal best jump was 8.43 metres, achieved in San Giovanni Valdarno on 16 May 1987. This stood as the Italian record until 2007, when Andrew Howe jumped 8.47. He has 59 caps in national team from 1982 to 1994.

== Achievements ==
Year	Competition	Venue	Position	Notes
Representing Italy
1982	European Indoor Championships	Milan, Italy	3rd	7.83 m
1982	European Championships	Athens, Greece	6th	7.89 m (wind: +0.7 m/s)
1983	World Championships	Helsinki, Finland	18th	7.70 m
1984	Olympic Games	Los Angeles, United States	3rd	8.24 m
1985	World Indoor Championships	Paris, France	3rd	7.88 m
1986	European Championships	Stuttgart, West Germany	3rd	7.92 m (wind: +0.2 m/s)
1987	World Indoor Championships	Indianapolis, United States	3rd	8.01 m
1987	European Indoor Championships	Liévin, France	2nd	8.26 m
1987	World Championships	Rome, Italy	4th	8.19 m
1988	European Indoor Championships	Budapest, Hungary	3rd	8.00 m
1988	Olympic Games	Seoul, South Korea	4th	8.08 m w
1990	European Championships	Split, Yugoslavia	7th	7.93 m (wind: 0.0 m/s)
1991	World Indoor Championships	Seville, Spain	3rd	7.93 m
1991	European Cup	Frankfurt, Germany	3rd	7.76 m
1991	World Championships	Tokyo, Japan	7th	8.01 m
1991	Mediterranean Games	Athens, Greece	3rd	7.89 m
1993	European Cup	Rome, Italy	1st	8.04 m w
1994	European Championships	Helsinki, Finland	13th	7.80 m (wind: -0.8 m/s)

== National titles ==
He has won 9 times the individual national championship.

- 4 wins in the long jump (1981, 1982, 1986, 1992)
- 5 wins in the long jump indoor (1982, 1984, 1987, 1992, 1994)

== See also ==
- Italy national athletics team - More caps
- Men's long jump Italian record progression
- Italian all-time lists - Long jump
