= National records in long jump =

The following table is an overview of national records in the long jump.

== Outdoor ==
=== Men ===
Country	Mark	Athlete	Date	Place	Ref.
United States	8.95 m (29 ft 4 1/4 in)	Mike Powell	30 August 1991	Tokyo	
Armenia	8.86 m (29 ft 3/4 in) A	Robert Emmiyan	22 May 1987	Tsaghkadzor	
Panama	8.73 m (28 ft 7 1/2 in)	Irving Saladino	24 May 2008	Hengelo	
Cuba	8.71 m (28 ft 6 3/4 in)	Iván Pedroso	18 July 1995	Salamanca	
Jamaica	8.69 m (28 ft 6 in)	Tajay Gayle	28 September 2019	Doha	
Greece	8.66 m (28 ft 4 3/4 in)	Louis Tsatoumas	2 June 2007	Kalamata	
Greece	8.66 m (28 ft 4 3/4 in)	Miltiadis Tentoglou	26 July 2026	Volos	
South Africa	8.65 m (28 ft 4 1/2 in) A	Luvo Manyonga	22 April 2017	Potchefstroom	
Spain	8.56 m (28 ft 1 in)	Yago Lamela	24 June 1999	Turin	
Russia	8.56 m (28 ft 1 in)	Aleksandr Menkov	16 August 2013	Moscow	
Germany	8.54 m (28 ft 0 in)	Lutz Dombrowski	28 July 1980	Moscow	
Australia	8.54 m (28 ft 0 in)	Mitchell Watt	29 July 2011	Stockholm	
Great Britain	8.51 m (27 ft 11 in)	Greg Rutherford	24 April 2014	Chula Vista	
Switzerland	8.51 m (27 ft 11 in) (+1.0 m/s)	Simon Ehammer	30 May 2026	Götzis	
Bulgaria	8.49 m (27 ft 10 1/4 in) (+1.3 m/s)	Bozhidar Sarâboyukov	14 July 2026	Plovdiv	
Saudi Arabia	8.48 m (27 ft 9 3/4 in)	Mohamed Al-Khuwalidi	2 July 2006	Sotteville-lès-Rouen	
Italy	8.47 m (27 ft 9 1/4 in)	Andrew Howe	30 August 2007	Osaka	
China	8.47 m (27 ft 9 1/4 in)	Li Jinzhe	29 June 2014	Bad Langensalza	
China	8.47 m (27 ft 9 1/4 in) A	Wang Jianan	16 June 2018	Guiyang	
Senegal	8.46 m (27 ft 9 in)	Cheikh Touré	15 June 1997	Bad Langensalza	
Mexico	8.46 m (27 ft 9 in)	Luis Rivera	12 July 2013	Kazan	
Serbia	8.45 m (27 ft 8 1/2 in)	Nenad Stekić	25 July 1975	Montreal	
Sweden	8.44 m (27 ft 8 1/4 in) A (+1.8 m/s)	Michel Tornéus	10 July 2016	Monachil	
Ghana	8.43 m (27 ft 7 3/4 in)	Ignisious Gaisah	14 July 2006	Rome	
France	8.42 m (27 ft 7 1/4 in)	Salim Sdiri	12 June 2009	Pierre-Bénite	
India	8.42 m (27 ft 7 1/4 in)	Jeswin Aldrin	2 March 2023	Ballari	
Bahamas	8.41 m (27 ft 7 in)	Craig Hepburn	17 June 1993	Nassau	
Brazil	8.40 m (27 ft 6 1/2 in)	Douglas de Souza	15 February 1995	São Paulo	
Slovenia	8.40 m (27 ft 6 1/2 in)	Gregor Cankar	18 May 1997	Celje	
Morocco	8.40 m (27 ft 6 1/2 in)	Yahya Berrabah	2 October 2009	Beirut	
Zimbabwe	8.40 m (27 ft 6 1/2 in)	Ngonidzashe Makusha	9 June 2011	Des Moines	
Japan	8.40 m (27 ft 6 1/2 in)	Shotaro Shiroyama	17 August 2019	Fukui	
Chinese Taipei	8.40 m (27 ft 6 1/2 in)	Lin Yu-tang	15 July 2023	Bangkok	
Romania	8.37 m (27 ft 5 1/2 in)	Bogdan Tudor	9 July 1995	Bad Cannstatt	
Portugal	8.36 m (27 ft 5 in)	Carlos Calado	20 June 1997	Lisbon	
Ukraine	8.35 m (27 ft 4 1/2 in)	Sergey Layevskiy	16 July 1988	Dnipropetrovsk	
Ukraine	8.35 m (27 ft 4 1/2 in)	Roman Shchurenko	25 July 2000	Kyiv	
Croatia	8.35 m (27 ft 4 1/2 in)	Filip Pravdica	11 May 2024	Kranj	
Venezuela	8.34 m (27 ft 4 1/4 in) A	Víctor Castillo	30 May 2004	Cochabamba	
Bermuda	8.34 m (27 ft 4 1/4 in)	Tyrone Smith	5 May 2017	Houston	
Belarus	8.33 m (27 ft 3 3/4 in) A	Aliaksandar Hlavatski	7 August 1996	Sestriere	
Egypt	8.31 m (27 ft 3 in)	Hatem Mersal	30 June 1999	Oslo	
Cayman Islands	8.31 m (27 ft 3 in)	Kareem Streete-Thompson	1 July 2000	Bad Langensalza	
Czech Republic	8.31 m (27 ft 3 in)	Radek Juška	27 August 2017	Taipei City	
Hungary	8.30 m (27 ft 2 3/4 in)	László Szalma	7 July 1985	Budapest	
Austria	8.30 m (27 ft 2 3/4 in)	Andreas Steiner	4 June 1988	Innsbruck	
Netherlands	8.29 m (27 ft 2 1/4 in)	Ignisious Gaisah	16 August 2013	Moscow	
Uzbekistan	8.29 m (27 ft 2 1/4 in) (+0.7 m/s)	Anvar Anvarov	26 June 2026	Zagreb	
Poland	8.28 m (27 ft 1 3/4 in) A	Grzegorz Marciniszyn	14 July 2001	Mals	
Mauritius	8.28 m (27 ft 1 3/4 in)	Jonathan Chimier	24 August 2004	Athens	
Canada	8.28 m (27 ft 1 3/4 in)	Damian Warner	29 May 2021	Götzis	
Uruguay	8.28 m (27 ft 1 3/4 in)	Emiliano Lasa	1 May 2022	São Paulo	
Nigeria	8.27 m (27 ft 1 1/2 in)	Yusuf Alli	8 August 1989	Lagos	
Botswana	8.27 m (27 ft 1 1/2 in)	Gable Garenamotse	20 August 2006	Rhede	
Finland	8.27 m (27 ft 1 1/2 in)	Kristian Pulli	11 June 2020	Espoo	
Namibia	8.27 m (27 ft 1 1/2 in) A	Chenault Lionel Coetzee	15 April 2023	Windhoek	
Algeria	8.26 m (27 ft 1 in)	Issam Nima	28 July 2007	Zaragoza	
Moldova	8.25 m (27 ft 3/4 in)	Sergey Podgainiy	18 August 1990	Chișinău	
Belgium	8.25 m (27 ft 3/4 in)	Erik Nys	6 July 1996	Hechtel	
Denmark	8.25 m (27 ft 3/4 in)	Morten Jensen	3 July 2005	Gothenburg	
Trinidad and Tobago	8.25 m (27 ft 3/4 in) A	Andwuelle Wright	5 July 2019	Querétaro	
Georgia	8.24 m (27 ft 1/4 in)	Bachana Khorava	29 May 2021	Tbilisi	
South Korea	8.22 m (26 ft 11 1/2 in)	Kim Deok-hyeon	10 June 2016	Ried im Innkreis	
Guyana	8.22 m (26 ft 11 1/2 in)	Emanuel Archibald	17 May 2025	Atlanta	
Norway	8.21 m (26 ft 11 in) A	Ingar Bratseth-Kiplesund	29 April 2023	Gaborone	
Iceland	8.21 m (26 ft 11 in)	Daníel Ingi Egilsson	19 May 2024	Malmö	
Colombia	8.20 m (26 ft 10 3/4 in) A	Arnovis Dalmero	5 August 2023	Bogotá	
Puerto Rico	8.19 m (26 ft 10 1/4 in) A	Elmer Williams	11 August 1989	Bogotá	
Tajikistan	8.18 m (26 ft 10 in)	Vasiliy Sokov	5 July 1988	Tallinn	
Iran	8.17 m (26 ft 9 1/2 in)	Mohammad Arzandeh	7 July 2012	Tehran	
Kyrgyzstan	8.16 m (26 ft 9 1/4 in)	Shamil Abbyasov	2 August 1981	Leningrad	
Kazakhstan	8.16 m (26 ft 9 1/4 in)	Sergey Vasilenko	18 June 1988	Alma Ata	
Ecuador	8.16 m (26 ft 9 1/4 in) A	Hugo Chila	23 November 2009	Sucre	
Albania	8.16 m (26 ft 9 1/4 in) NWI	Izmir Smajlaj	8 May 2021	Tirana	
Lithuania	8.15 m (26 ft 8 3/4 in)	Povilas Mykolaitis	4 June 2011	Kaunas	
Sri Lanka	8.15 m (26 ft 8 3/4 in)	W. P. Amila Jayasiri	16 August 2016	Diyagama	
Qatar	8.13 m (26 ft 8 in)	Abdulrahman Al-Nubi	21 September 2003	Manila	
Ethiopia	8.13 m (26 ft 8 in) A NWI	Buli Melaku	10 May 2025	Addis Ababa	
Kenya	8.12 m (26 ft 7 1/2 in) A	Jacob Katonon	23 September 1995	Johannesburg	
Hong Kong	8.12 m (26 ft 7 1/2 in)	Chan Ming Tai	7 May 2016	Hong Kong	
U.S. Virgin Islands	8.11 m (26 ft 7 1/4 in)	Leon Hunt	18 June 2011	Tallahassee	
Peru	8.11 m (26 ft 7 1/4 in)	José Luis Mandros	30 May 2025	Castellón de la Plana	
Estonia	8.10 m (26 ft 6 3/4 in)	Erki Nool	27 May 1995	Götzis	
Grenada	8.09 m (26 ft 6 1/2 in)	Eugene Licorish	5 May 1989	Port of Spain	
Indonesia	8.09 m (26 ft 6 1/2 in)	Sapwaturrahman	26 August 2018	Jakarta	
Turkey	8.08 m (26 ft 6 in)	Mesut Yavaş	24 June 2000	Istanbul	
Saint Vincent and the Grenadines	8.08 m (26 ft 6 in)	Clayton Latham	29 July 2008	Hamburg	
Chile	8.08 m (26 ft 6 in)	Daniel Pineda	21 April 2012	Santiago	
Latvia	8.08 m (26 ft 6 in)	Elvijs Misāns	12 July 2016	Saldus	
Dominica	8.08 m (26 ft 6 in)	Tristan James	29 May 2022	Chula Vista	
Philippines	8.08 m (26 ft 6 in)	Janry Ubas	8 May 2023	Phnom Penh	
Ireland	8.07 m (26 ft 5 1/2 in)	Ciaran McDonagh	21 August 2005	La Chaux-de-Fonds	
Turks and Caicos Islands	8.06 m (26 ft 5 1/4 in)	Ifeanyichukwu Otuonye	9 June 2018	Chula Vista	
New Zealand	8.05 m (26 ft 4 3/4 in)	Bob Thomas	20 January 1968	Whangārei	
Slovakia	8.05 m (26 ft 4 3/4 in)	Róbert Széli	6 July 1988	Budapest	
Thailand	8.05 m (26 ft 4 3/4 in)	Supanara Sukhasvasti	10 July 2011	Kobe	
Azerbaijan	8.03 m (26 ft 4 in)	Vladimir Tsepelyov	17 September 1978	Tbilisi	
Libya	8.03 m (26 ft 4 in)	Mohamed Bishty	25 May 1985	Chania	
Cameroon	8.03 m (26 ft 4 in) A NWI	Marcel Mayack	2 March 2019	Bafoussam	
Antigua and Barbuda	8.02 m (26 ft 3 1/2 in)	Lester Benjamin	12 May 1984	Baton Rouge	
Kuwait	8.02 m (26 ft 3 1/2 in)	Saleh Al-Haddad	5 May 2009	Kuwait City	
Malaysia	8.02 m (26 ft 3 1/2 in)	Andre Anura	7 December 2019	New Clark City	
Tunisia	8.01 m (26 ft 3 1/4 in)	Anis Gallali	22 August 1998	Dakar	
French Polynesia	8.01 m (26 ft 3 1/4 in)	Raihau Maiau	9 August 2025	Artashat	
Burkina Faso	8.00 m (26 ft 2 3/4 in)	Franck Zio	21 June 1998	Viry-Châtillon	
Togo	8.00 m (26 ft 2 3/4 in) A	Téko Folligan	15 September 1999	Johannesburg	
Liberia	8.00 m (26 ft 2 3/4 in)	Cadeau Kelley	18 April 2009	Ypsilanti	
Sri Lanka	7.71 m (25 ft 3 1/2 in) (+1.7 m/s)	Xaidavahn Vongsavanh	15 July 2023	Bangkok	

=== Women ===
Country	Mark	Athlete	Date	Place	Ref.
Russia	7.52 m (24 ft 8 in)	Galina Chistyakova	11 June 1988	Leningrad	
United States	7.49 m (24 ft 6 3/4 in)	Jackie Joyner-Kersee	22 May 1994	New York City	
United States	7.49 m (24 ft 6 3/4 in) A	Jackie Joyner-Kersee	31 July 1994	Sestriere	
Germany	7.48 m (24 ft 6 1/4 in)	Heike Drechsler	9 July 1988	Neubrandenburg	
Germany	7.48 m (24 ft 6 1/4 in)	Heike Drechsler	8 July 1992	Lausanne	
Romania	7.43 m (24 ft 4 1/2 in)	Anișoara Cușmir	4 June 1983	Bucharest	
Belarus	7.39 m (24 ft 2 3/4 in)	Yelena Belevskaya	18 July 1987	Bryansk	
Kazakhstan	7.31 m (23 ft 11 3/4 in)	Olena Khlopotnova	12 September 1985	Alma Ata	
Brazil	7.26 m (23 ft 9 3/4 in) A	Maurren Maggi	26 July 1999	Bogotá	
Ukraine	7.24 m (23 ft 9 in)	Larysa Berezhna	25 May 1991	Granada	
Lithuania	7.20 m (23 ft 7 1/4 in)	Irena Oženko	12 September 1986	Budapest	
Nigeria	7.17 m (23 ft 6 1/4 in)	Ese Brume	29 May 2021	Chula Vista	
Jamaica	7.16 m (23 ft 5 3/4 in) A	Elva Goulbourne	22 May 2004	Mexico City	
Serbia	7.14 m (23 ft 5 in)	Ivana Vuleta	20 August 2023	Budapest	
Australia	7.13 m (23 ft 4 1/2 in)	Brooke Buschkuehl	9 July 2022	Chula Vista	
Portugal	7.12 m (23 ft 4 1/4 in)	Naide Gomes	29 July 2008	Monaco	
Italy	7.12 m (23 ft 4 1/4 in) (+1.8 m/s)	Larissa Iapichino	4 July 2026	Eugene	
Austria	7.09 m (23 ft 3 in)	Ludmila Ninova	5 June 1994	Seville	
British Virgin Islands	7.08 m (23 ft 2 1/2 in)	Chantel Malone	27 March 2021	Miramar	
Great Britain	7.07 m (23 ft 2 1/4 in)	Shara Proctor	28 August 2015	Beijing	
Kyrgyzstan	7.06 m (23 ft 1 3/4 in)	Tatyana Kolpakova	31 July 1980	Moscow	
Spain	7.06 m (23 ft 1 3/4 in)	Niurka Montalvo	23 August 1999	Seville	
France	7.05 m (23 ft 1 1/2 in)	Eunice Barber	14 September 2003	Monaco	
Greece	7.03 m (23 ft 3/4 in)	Niki Xanthou	18 August 1997	Bellinzona	
São Tomé and Príncipe	7.03 m (23 ft 3/4 in)	Agate de Sousa	27 May 2023	Weinheim	
Slovakia	7.01 m (22 ft 11 3/4 in)	Eva Murková	26 May 1984	Leningrad	
China	7.01 m (22 ft 11 3/4 in)	Yao Weili	4 June 1993	Jinan	
Bulgaria	7.00 m (22 ft 11 1/2 in)	Silvia Khristova-Moneva	3 August 1986	Sofia	
Cuba	6.99 m (22 ft 11 in)	Lissette Cuza	3 June 2000	Jena	
Sweden	6.99 m (22 ft 11 in) (+1.9 m/s)	Erica Johansson	5 July 2000	Lausanne	
Canada	6.99 m (22 ft 11 in)	Christabel Nettey	29 May 2015	Eugene	
Poland	6.97 m (22 ft 10 1/4 in)	Agata Karczmarek	6 August 1988	Lublin	
Japan	6.97 m (22 ft 10 1/4 in)	Sumire Hata	14 July 2023	Bangkok	
Puerto Rico	6.96 m (22 ft 10 in) A	Madeline de Jesús	24 July 1988	Mexico City	
Denmark	6.96 m (22 ft 10 in)	Renata Nielsen	5 June 1994	Seville	
Trinidad and Tobago	6.96 m (22 ft 10 in)	Tyra Gittens	14 May 2021	College Station	
Colombia	6.95 m (22 ft 9 1/2 in)	Natalia Linares	1 December 2025	Lima	
Ghana	6.94 m (22 ft 9 in)	Deborah Acquah	7 August 2022	Birmingham	
Burkina Faso	6.94 m (22 ft 9 in)	Marthe Koala	2 August 2023	Kinshasa	
South Africa	6.93 m (22 ft 8 3/4 in)	Karin Melis Mey	7 July 2007	Bad Langensalza	
South Africa	6.93 m (22 ft 8 3/4 in)	Karin Melis Mey	7 June 2008	Bad Langensalza	
Latvia	6.92 m (22 ft 8 1/4 in)	Ineta Radēviča	28 July 2010	Barcelona	
Netherlands	6.91 m (22 ft 8 in)	Pauline Hondema	12 July 2025	Kortrijk	
Czech Republic	6.89 m (22 ft 7 1/4 in)	Jarmila Strejčková	18 September 1982	Prague	
Venezuela	6.88 m (22 ft 6 3/4 in)	Yulimar Rojas	13 June 2021	La Nucia	
India	6.88 m (22 ft 6 3/4 in) (+0.7 m/s)	Ancy Sojan	27 June 2026	Bhubaneswar	
Turkey	6.87 m (22 ft 6 1/4 in)	Karin Melis Mey	31 July 2009	Leverkusen	
Estonia	6.87 m (22 ft 6 1/4 in)	Ksenija Balta	8 August 2010	Tallinn	
Hungary	6.86 m (22 ft 6 in)	Tünde Vaszi	7 August 2001	Edmonton	
Belgium	6.86 m (22 ft 6 in)	Nafissatou Thiam	18 August 2019	Birmingham	
Finland	6.85 m (22 ft 5 1/2 in)	Ringa Ropo-Junnila	11 August 1990	Lahti	
Uzbekistan	6.85 m (22 ft 5 1/2 in)	Darya Reznichenko	28 June 2021	Tashkent	
Switzerland	6.84 m (22 ft 5 1/4 in)	Irène Pusterla	20 August 2011	Chiasso	
Switzerland	6.84 m (22 ft 5 1/4 in)	Annik Kälin	8 June 2024	Rome	
Bahamas	6.83 m (22 ft 4 3/4 in)	Bianca Stuart	26 June 2015	Nassau	
Bahamas	6.83 m (22 ft 4 3/4 in)	Anthaya Charlton	17 April 2026	Gainesville	
Guyana	6.81 m (22 ft 4 in)	Jennifer Inniss	18 June 1983	Indianapolis	
Cyprus	6.80 m (22 ft 3 1/2 in)	Maroula Lambrou	25 March 1985	Limassol	
Barbados	6.80 m (22 ft 3 1/2 in)	Akela Jones	29 May 2021	Chula Vista	
Slovenia	6.78 m (22 ft 2 3/4 in)	Nina Kolarič	29 June 2008	Ptuj	
Syria	6.77 m (22 ft 2 1/2 in)	Ghada Shouaa	26 May 1996	Götzis	
South Korea	6.76 m (22 ft 2 in)	Jung Soon-ok	4 June 2009	Daegu	
Sierra Leone	6.75 m (22 ft 1 1/2 in)	Eunice Barber	5 June 1998	Lyon	
Norway	6.68 m (21 ft 10 3/4 in)	Margrethe Renstrøm	27 July 2010	Barcelona	
Dominica	6.64 m (21 ft 9 1/4 in) (+0.4 m/s)	Thea LaFond	1 May 2022	São Paulo	
Dominican Republic	6.63 m (21 ft 9 in) (±0.0 m/s)	Evelina Minaya	21 March 2026	Bayaguana	
Morocco	6.55 m (21 ft 5 3/4 in) (+0.9 m/s)	Yousra Lajdoud	2 August 2023	Kinshasa	
Bahrain	6.09 m (19 ft 11 3/4 in) (+0.2 m/s)	Fatima Moubarak	4 July 2023	Oran	
Mauritius	6.03 m (19 ft 9 1/4 in) NWI	Machella Février	31 May 2025	Réduit	
Saudi Arabia	5.27 m (17 ft 3 1/4 in) (+0.1 m/s)	Khadijah Aamer	19 December 2025	Qatif	
Turks and Caicos Islands	4.98 m (16 ft 4 in) NWI	Tashy Forbes	2004	Kew	
Turks and Caicos Islands	4.98 m (16 ft 4 in) (−2.4 m/s)	Lynn Antoine	10 April 2023	Nassau	

== Indoor ==
=== Men ===
Country	Mark	Athlete	Date	Place	Ref.
United States	8.79 m (28 ft 10 in)	Carl Lewis	27 January 1984	New York City	
Germany	8.71 m (28 ft 6 3/4 in)	Sebastian Bayer	8 March 2009	Turin	
Cuba	8.62 m (28 ft 3 1/4 in)	Iván Pedroso	7 March 1999	Maebashi	
Spain	8.56 m (28 ft 1 in)	Yago Lamela	7 March 1999	Maebashi	
Greece	8.55 m (28 ft 1/2 in)	Miltiadis Tentoglou	18 March 2022	Belgrade	
Armenia	8.49 m (27 ft 10 1/4 in)	Robert Emmiyan	21 February 1987	Liévin	
Portugal	8.46 m (27 ft 9 in)	Gerson Baldé	22 March 2026	Toruń	
Bulgaria	8.45 m (27 ft 8 1/2 in)	Bozhidar Sarâboyukov	11 February 2026	Belgrade	
South Africa	8.44 m (27 ft 8 1/4 in)	Luvo Manyonga	2 March 2018	Birmingham	
Russia	8.43 m (27 ft 7 3/4 in)	Stanislav Tarasenko	26 January 1994	Moscow	
Panama	8.42 m (27 ft 7 1/4 in)	Irving Saladino	13 February 2008	Athens	
Jamaica	8.40 m (27 ft 6 1/2 in)	James Beckford	9 February 1996	Madrid	
Jamaica	8.40 m (27 ft 6 1/2 in) A	Carey McLeod	10 March 2023	Albuquerque	
Jamaica	8.40 m (27 ft 6 1/2 in)	Wayne Pinnock	8 March 2024	Boston	
Italy	8.39 m (27 ft 6 1/4 in)	Mattia Furlani	8 February 2026	Metz	
Italy	8.39 m (27 ft 6 1/4 in)	Mattia Furlani	22 March 2026	Toruń	
Sweden	8.38 m (27 ft 5 3/4 in)	Thobias Montler	18 March 2022	Belgrade	
Ghana	8.36 m (27 ft 5 in)	Ignisious Gaisah	2 February 2006	Stockholm	
Ukraine	8.33 m (27 ft 3 3/4 in)	Roman Shchurenko	16 February 2002	Brovary	
Romania	8.30 m (27 ft 2 3/4 in)	Bogdan Țăruș	29 January 2000	Bucharest	
Slovenia	8.28 m (27 ft 1 3/4 in)	Gregor Cankar	7 March 1999	Maebashi	
Brazil	8.28 m (27 ft 1 3/4 in)	Mauro Vinícius da Silva	9 March 2012	Istanbul	
Brazil	8.28 m (27 ft 1 3/4 in)	Mauro Vinícius da Silva	8 March 2014	Sopot	
France	8.27 m (27 ft 1 1/2 in)	Salim Sdiri	28 January 2006	Mondeville	
China	8.27 m (27 ft 1 1/2 in)	Su Xiongfeng	11 March 2010	Nanjing	
Nigeria	8.26 m (27 ft 1 in)	Charlton Ehizuelen	7 March 1975	Bloomington	
Great Britain	8.26 m (27 ft 1 in) A	Greg Rutherford	5 February 2016	Albuquerque	
Switzerland	8.26 m (27 ft 1 in)	Simon Ehammer	29 January 2022	Aubière	
Georgia	8.25 m (27 ft 3/4 in)	Bachana Khorava	7 February 2016	Tbilisi	
Australia	8.25 m (27 ft 3/4 in)	Fabrice Lapierre	20 March 2016	Portland	
Hungary	8.24 m (27 ft 1/4 in)	László Szalma	22 February 1986	Madrid	
Saudi Arabia	8.24 m (27 ft 1/4 in)	Mohammed Al-Khuwalidi	16 February 2008	Doha	
Finland	8.24 m (27 ft 1/4 in)	Kristian Pulli	5 March 2021	Toruń	
Netherlands	8.23 m (27 ft 0 in)	Emiel Mellaard	5 February 1989	The Hague	
Zimbabwe	8.21 m (26 ft 11 in)	Ngonidzashe Makusha	27 February 2009	Blacksburg	
Japan	8.21 m (26 ft 11 in)	Shunsuke Izumiya	23 March 2025	Nanjing	
Trinidad and Tobago	8.21 m (26 ft 11 in)	Kelsey Daniel	26 February 2026	College Station	
India	8.21 m (26 ft 11 in)	Lokesh Sathyanathan	13 March 2026	Fayetteville	
Norway	8.19 m (26 ft 10 1/4 in)	Sander Skotheim	1 February 2025	Tallinn	
Czech Republic	8.18 m (26 ft 10 in)	Milan Gombala	16 February 1992	Prague	
Denmark	8.18 m (26 ft 10 in)	Morten Jensen	8 February 2006	Gothenburg	
Poland	8.18 m (26 ft 10 in)	Marcin Starzak	8 March 2009	Turin	
Poland	8.18 m (26 ft 10 in)	Adrian Strzałkowski	7 March 2014	Sopot	
Bahamas	8.18 m (26 ft 10 in)	LaQuan Nairn	18 February 2022	Fayetteville	
Senegal	8.17 m (26 ft 9 1/2 in)	Cheikh Touré	15 February 1998	Bordeaux	
Peru	8.17 m (26 ft 9 1/2 in) A	José Luis Mandros	20 February 2022	Cochabamba	
Cayman Islands	8.16 m (26 ft 9 1/4 in)	Kareem Streete-Thompson	11 March 2001	Lisbon	
Colombia	8.16 m (26 ft 9 1/4 in) A	Arnovis Dalmero	25 January 2024	Cochabamba	
Lithuania	8.13 m (26 ft 8 in)	Povilas Mykolaitis	11 February 2005	Kaunas	
Puerto Rico	8.12 m (26 ft 7 1/2 in)	Mike Francis	6 March 1992	Manhattan	
Latvia	8.11 m (26 ft 7 1/4 in)	Artūrs Āboliņš	10 March 2006	Fayetteville	
Belarus	8.10 m (26 ft 6 3/4 in)	Aleksandr Glavatskiy	15 January 1994	Gomel	
Uruguay	8.10 m (26 ft 6 3/4 in) A	Emiliano Lasa	20 February 2022	Cochabamba	
Kyrgyzstan	8.09 m (26 ft 6 1/2 in)	Shamil Abbyasov	8 February 1985	Moscow	
Turkey	8.09 m (26 ft 6 1/2 in)	Mesut Yavaş	3 March 2000	Ames	
Moldova	8.09 m (26 ft 6 1/2 in)	Alexandru Cuharenco	3 February 2012	Chișinău	
Belgium	8.08 m (26 ft 6 in)	Erik Nys	12 February 1995	Ghent	
Croatia	8.08 m (26 ft 6 in)	Siniša Ergotić	8 February 2003	Budapest	
Albania	8.08 m (26 ft 6 in)	Izmir Smajlaj	4 March 2017	Belgrade	
Burkina Faso	8.06 m (26 ft 5 1/4 in)	Franck Zio	3 February 1996	Liévin	
Estonia	8.05 m (26 ft 4 3/4 in)	Tõnu Lepik	15 March 1970	Vienna	
Guyana	8.05 m (26 ft 4 3/4 in)	Mark Mason	25 January 1991	Johnson City	
Mauritius	8.05 m (26 ft 4 3/4 in)	Jonathan Chimier	22 February 2004	Aubière	
Canada	8.05 m (26 ft 4 3/4 in)	Damian Warner	18 March 2022	Belgrade	
Saint Vincent and the Grenadines	8.04 m (26 ft 4 1/2 in)	Uroy Ryan	13 March 2026	Fayetteville	
Serbia	8.03 m (26 ft 4 in)	Strahinja Jovančević	3 March 2019	Glasgow	
Tajikistan	8.02 m (26 ft 3 1/2 in)	Vasiliy Sokov	4 February 1989	Gomel	
Morocco	8.02 m (26 ft 3 1/2 in)	Younés Moudrik	2 February 2001	Erfurt	
Morocco	8.02 m (26 ft 3 1/2 in)	Younés Moudrik	14 March 2001	Madrid	
Morocco	8.02 m (26 ft 3 1/2 in)	Younés Moudrik	1 February 2002	Erfurt	
Morocco	8.02 m (26 ft 3 1/2 in)	Yahya Berrabah	13 February 2010	Valencia	
French Polynesia	8.02 m (26 ft 3 1/2 in)	Raihau Maiau	4 February 2016	Nantes	
Chinese Taipei	8.02 m (26 ft 3 1/2 in)	Lin Yu-tang	12 February 2023	Astana	
Botswana	8.01 m (26 ft 3 1/4 in)	Gable Garenamotse	3 February 2002	Cardiff	
Mexico	8.01 m (26 ft 3 1/4 in)	Luis Rivera	7 March 2014	Sopot	
Azerbaijan	8.00 m (26 ft 2 3/4 in)	Vladimir Tsepelyov	6 February 1983	Vilnius	
Venezuela	8.00 m (26 ft 2 3/4 in) A	Victor Castillo	5 February 2005	Flagstaff	
Ireland	8.00 m (26 ft 2 3/4 in)	Ciaran McDonagh	14 January 2006	Blacksburg	

=== Women ===
Country	Time	Athlete	Date	Place	Ref.
Germany	7.37 m (24 ft 2 in)	Heike Drechsler	13 February 1988	Vienna	
Russia	7.30 m (23 ft 11 1/4 in)	Galina Chistyakova	28 January 1989	Lipetsk	
Serbia	7.24 m (23 ft 9 in)	Ivana Španović	5 March 2017	Belgrade	
United States	7.23 m (23 ft 8 1/2 in)	Brittney Reese	11 March 2012	Istanbul	
Ukraine	7.20 m (23 ft 7 1/4 in)	Larysa Berezhna	4 February 1989	Gomel	
Kazakhstan	7.17 m (23 ft 6 1/4 in)	Olena Khlopotnova	16 February 1985	Kishinev	
Lithuania	7.01 m (22 ft 11 3/4 in)	Nijolė Medvedeva	25 January 1987	Vilnius	
Belarus	7.01 m (22 ft 11 3/4 in)	Yelena Belevskaya	14 February 1987	Moscow	
Portugal	7.00 m (22 ft 11 1/2 in)	Naide Gomes	9 March 2008	Valencia	
Great Britain	7.00 m (22 ft 11 1/2 in)	Jazmin Sawyers	5 March 2023	Istanbul	
Slovakia	6.99 m (22 ft 11 in)	Eva Murková	2 March 1985	Piraeus	
Romania	6.99 m (22 ft 11 in)	Mirela Dulgheru	23 January 1993	Bacău	
Canada	6.99 m (22 ft 11 in)	Christabel Nettey	19 February 2015	Stockholm	
Bahamas	6.98 m (22 ft 10 3/4 in)	Anthaya Charlton	31 January 2025	Fayetteville	
Nigeria	6.97 m (22 ft 10 1/4 in)	Chioma Ajunwa	5 February 1997	Erfurt	
Italy	6.97 m (22 ft 10 1/4 in)	Larissa Iapichino	5 March 2023	Istanbul	
Sweden	6.92 m (22 ft 8 1/4 in)	Carolina Klüft	7 March 2004	Budapest	
Sweden	6.92 m (22 ft 8 1/4 in)	Khaddi Sagnia	25 February 2018	Glasgow	
Greece	6.91 m (22 ft 8 in)	Niki Xanthou	16 February 1997	Liévin	
Bulgaria	6.91 m (22 ft 8 in)	Magdalena Khristova	19 February 1998	Stockholm	
Jamaica	6.91 m (22 ft 8 in)	Elva Goulbourne	23 February 2002	Fayetteville	
France	6.90 m (22 ft 7 1/2 in)	Éloyse Lesueur	2 March 2013	Gothenburg	
Switzerland	6.90 m (22 ft 7 1/2 in)	Annik Kälin	8 March 2025	Apeldoorn	
Brazil	6.89 m (22 ft 7 1/4 in)	Maurren Maggi	9 March 2008	Valencia	
Spain	6.88 m (22 ft 6 3/4 in)	Niurka Montalvo	10 March 2001	Lisbon	
Estonia	6.87 m (22 ft 6 1/4 in)	Ksenija Balta	7 March 2009	Turin	
Sierra Leone	6.86 m (22 ft 6 in)	Eunice Barber	15 February 1998	Bordeaux	
South Africa	6.85 m (22 ft 5 1/2 in)	Karin Melis Mey	21 February 2008	Stockholm	
Trinidad and Tobago	6.83 m (22 ft 4 3/4 in)	Tyra Gittens	30 January 2026	Manhattan	
China	6.82 m (22 ft 4 1/2 in)	Yang Juan	13 March 1992	Beijing	
Hungary	6.82 m (22 ft 4 1/2 in)	Tünde Vaszi	29 January 1999	Chemnitz	
Latvia	6.82 m (22 ft 4 1/2 in)	Aiga Grabuste	8 February 2015	Tbilisi	
Australia	6.81 m (22 ft 4 in)	Nicole Boegman	12 March 1995	Barcelona	
Austria	6.81 m (22 ft 4 in)	Ludmila Ninova	14 February 1996	Moscow	
Venezuela	6.81 m (22 ft 4 in)	Yulimar Rojas	17 February 2022	Liévin	
Barbados	6.80 m (22 ft 3 1/2 in)	Akela Jones	11 March 2016	Birmingham	
Barbados	6.80 m (22 ft 3 1/2 in)	Akela Jones	11 February 2022	Clemson	
Colombia	6.80 m (22 ft 3 1/2 in)	Natalia Linares	22 March 2026	Toruń	
Cuba	6.79 m (22 ft 3 1/4 in)	Yargelis Savigne	3 February 2007	Stuttgart	
Belgium	6.79 m (22 ft 3 1/4 in)	Nafissatou Thiam	1 March 2020	Liévin	
Finland	6.78 m (22 ft 2 3/4 in)	Ringa Ropo-Junnila	19 February 1991	Stockholm	
Denmark	6.77 m (22 ft 2 1/2 in)	Renata Nielsen	12 March 1995	Barcelona	
Poland	6.77 m (22 ft 2 1/2 in)	Anna Matuszewicz	31 January 2026	Gorzów Wielkopolski	
Sri Lanka	6.11 m (20 ft 1/2 in)	Madushani Herath	8 February 2026	Tianjin	
Argentina	6.00 m (19 ft 8 in) A	Milagros D'Amico	28 February 2026	Cochabamba	
Singapore	5.96 m (19 ft 6 1/2 in)	Tia Rozario	8 February 2026	Tianjin	
