= Athletics at the 1999 Summer Universiade – Men's long jump =

University Sporting Event

The men's long jump event at the 1999 Summer Universiade was held at the Estadio Son Moix in Palma de Mallorca, Spain on 11 and 12 July.

== Medalists ==
Gold	Silver	Bronze
Olexiy Lukashevych; Ukraine	Luis Felipe Méliz; Cuba	Erik Nys; Belgium

== Results ==
=== Qualification ===
Qualification: 7.85 (Q) or at least 12 best performers (q) advance to the final

Rank	Group	Athlete	Nationality	Result	Notes
1	B	Luis Felipe Méliz	Cuba	7.96	Q
2	B	Olexiy Lukashevych	Ukraine	7.93	Q
3	B	Andrey Bragin	Russia	7.81	q
4	B	Ranko Leskovar	Slovenia	7.73	q
5	A	Erik Nys	Belgium	7.72	q
6	A	Dejan Vojnović	Croatia	7.71	q
6	B	Frankie Young	United States	7.71	q
8	A	Hsu Chih-hsiung	Chinese Taipei	7.68	q
9	A	Roman Shchurenko	Ukraine	7.68	q
10	A	Denis Savelyev	Russia	7.66	q
11	B	Nélson Carlos Ferreira	Brazil	7.62	q
12	B	Krzysztof Łuczak	Poland	7.57	q
13	A	Peter Häggström	Sweden	7.54	
14	A	Shinichi Terano	Japan	7.52	
15	A	Richard Duncan	Canada	7.52	
16	B	Kenneth Kastrén	Finland	7.51	
17	A	Luis Quiñones	Puerto Rico	7.40	
18	A	Jirí Kuntoš	Czech Republic	7.33	
19	B	Tamás Margl	Hungary	7.30	
20	B	Chiu Chun-ching	Chinese Taipei	7.22	
21	A	Shaun Babo	Papua New Guinea	6.85	
22	B	Nguyen Thanh De	Vietnam	6.22	
23	A	Karl Jallad	Lebanon	6.15	
24	B	Leong Kin Kuan	Macau	5.15	
25	B	Alvin Rentería	Colombia	5.08	
	A	Chris Davidson	Great Britain	NM	
	A	Melvin Lister	United States	NM	
	B	Kim Hyuk	South Korea	DNS	

=== Final ===
Rank	Athlete	Nationality	#1	#2	#3	#4	#5	#6	Result	Notes
1st place, gold medalist(s)	Olexiy Lukashevych	Ukraine	7.99	8.16	x	x	7.76	–	8.16	
2nd place, silver medalist(s)	Luis Felipe Méliz	Cuba	7.77	8.05	7.93	7.64	x	7.84	8.05	
3rd place, bronze medalist(s)	Erik Nys	Belgium	7.67	7.84	x	7.84	x	7.99	7.99	
4	Roman Shchurenko	Ukraine							7.96	
5	Nélson Carlos Ferreira	Brazil							7.83	
6	Denis Savelyev	Russia							7.82	
7	Krzysztof Łuczak	Poland							7.80	
8	Andrey Bragin	Russia							7.73	
9	Hsu Chih-hsiung	Chinese Taipei							7.70	
10	Frankie Young	United States							7.61	
11	Dejan Vojnović	Croatia							7.58	
12	Ranko Leskovar	Slovenia							7.53	
