= Athletics at the 2000 Summer Olympics – Men's long jump =

Men's long jump at the Games of the XXVII Olympiad
- Pictogram for athletics
- Venue: Stadium Australia
- Dates: 25 September 2000 (qualifying); 28 September 2000 (final)
- Competitors: 53 from 38 nations
- Winning distance: 8.55

Medalists
1st place, gold medalist(s)		Iván Pedroso	Cuba
2nd place, silver medalist(s)		Jai Taurima	Australia
3rd place, bronze medalist(s)		Roman Shchurenko	Ukraine

The men's long jump event at the 2000 Summer Olympics took place on Monday, 25 September, and Thursday, 28 September 2000, in Sydney, Australia. Fifty-three athletes from 38 nations competed. The maximum number of athletes per nation had been set at 3 since the 1930 Olympic Congress. The event was won by Iván Pedroso of Cuba, the nation's first medal and title in the men's long jump; it snapped a four-Games streak of American (and, specifically, Carl Lewis) victories. Jai Taurima took silver, Australia's third silver in the event (1948 and 1984). Roman Shchurenko earned Ukraine's first medal in the men's long jump with his bronze. It was the first time the United States had competed in the event and not won at least a silver medal; the Americans had previously failed to place in the top two only at the boycotted 1980 Games.

== Background ==
This was the 24th appearance of the event, which is one of 12 athletics events to have been held at every Summer Olympics. The returning finalists from the 1996 Games were silver medalist James Beckford of Jamaica, sixth-place finisher Gregor Cankar of Slovenia, eighth-place finisher Mattias Sunneborn of Sweden, and twelfth-place finisher Iván Pedroso of Cuba. Pedroso had been the best long jumper in the world since 1995, winning the 1995, 1997, and 1999 world championships (he would later win again in 2001); he had struggled with a hamstring injury in 1996, hampering his Olympic medal hopes in Atlanta. The American team of Carl Lewis, Mike Powell, and Joe Greene which had competed together the last two Games, sweeping the 1992 medals and taking gold, bronze, and 5th in 1996, had completely turned over. The United States had no particularly strong replacements; the nation's top jumper, Dwight Phillips, would later be dominant in the event but was not there yet in 2000. Jai Taurima, of the host Australia, was Pedroso's strongest challenger.

Lithuania, Mauritius, Morocco, Namibia, and Uzbekistan each made their first appearance in the event. The United States appeared for the 23rd time, most of any nation, having missed only the boycotted 1980 Games.

== Qualification ==
Each National Olympic Committee was permitted to enter up to three athletes that had jumped 8.05 metres or further during the qualification period. The maximum number of athletes per nation had been set at 3 since the 1930 Olympic Congress. If an NOC had no athletes that qualified under that standard, one athlete that had jumped 7.95 metres or further could be entered.

== Competition format ==
The 2000 competition used the two-round format with divided final introduced in 1952. The qualifying round gave each competitor three jumps to achieve a distance of 8.15 metres; if fewer than 12 men did so, the top 12 (including all those tied) would advance. The final provided each jumper with three jumps; the top eight jumpers received an additional three jumps for a total of six, with the best to count (qualifying round jumps were not considered for the final).

== Records ==
The standing world and Olympic records prior to the event were as follows.

World record	Mike Powell (USA)	8.95	Tokyo, Japan	30 August 1991
Olympic record	Bob Beamon (USA)	8.90	Mexico City, Mexico	18 October 1968

No new world or Olympic records were set during the competition.

== Schedule ==
All times are Australian Eastern Standard Time (UTC+10)

Date	Time	Round
Monday, 25 September 2000	10:45	Qualifying
Thursday, 28 September 2000	18:45	Final

== Results ==
=== Qualifying ===
The qualifying round was held on 25 September 2000. The qualifying distance was 8.15m. For all qualifiers who did not achieve the standard, the remaining spaces in the final were filled by the longest jumps until a total of 12 qualifiers.

Rank	Athlete	Nation	Group	1	2	3	Distance	Notes
1	Iván Pedroso	Cuba	A	7.70	7.99	8.32	8.32	Q
2	Luis Méliz	Cuba	B	7.87	8.21	—	8.21	Q
3	Dwight Phillips	United States	B	7.84	7.83	8.13	8.13	q
4	Jai Taurima	Australia	A	7.99	7.77	8.09	8.09	q
5	Peter Burge	Australia	B	7.62	7.96	8.06	8.06	q
6	Carlos Calado	Portugal	B	8.04	7.98	7.96	8.04	q
7	Vladimir Malyavin	Russia	B	X	7.96	8.03	8.03	q
8	Petar Dachev	Bulgaria	B	8.03	X	7.85	8.03	q
9	Kofi Amoah Prah	Germany	A	7.86	7.92	8.01	8.01	q
10	Olexiy Lukashevych	Ukraine	A	7.86	X	8.01	8.01	q
11	Roman Shchurenko	Ukraine	B	8.01	X	X	8.01	q
12	Bogdan Tarus	Romania	B	7.60	8.00	X	8.00	q
13	Kareem Streete-Thompson	Cayman Islands	A	7.99	7.76	X	7.99	
14	James Beckford	Jamaica	B	7.87	7.87	7.98	7.98	
15	Gregor Cankar	Slovenia	A	7.71	5.96	7.98	7.98	
16	Kirill Sosunov	Russia	B	7.97	X	7.93	7.97	
17	Younés Moudrik	Morocco	A	7.95	7.83	X	7.95	
18	Hussein Taher Al-Sabee	Saudi Arabia	B	X	5.92	7.94	7.94	
19	Yago Lamela	Spain	B	7.68	7.74	7.89	7.89	
20	Cheikh Tidiane Touré	France	B	7.87	X	X	7.87	
21	Danijal Jahić	FR Yugoslavia	B	7.85	7.70	X	7.85	
22	Savante Stringfellow	United States	A	7.32	7.70	7.84	7.84	
23	Masaki Morinaga	Japan	A	X	7.84	X	7.84	
24	Peter Häggström	Sweden	A	X	7.80	7.83	7.83	
25	Melvin Lister	United States	A	7.57	7.82	7.76	7.82	
26	Danil Burkenya	Russia	A	7.75	7.79	X	7.79	
27	Tomas Bardauskas	Lithuania	A	7.18	7.70	6.95	7.70	
28	Ronald Servius	France	B	X	X	7.66	7.66	
29	Mattias Sunneborn	Sweden	B	7.45	7.58	7.63	7.63	
30	Nikolay Atanasov	Bulgaria	A	X	X	7.62	7.62	
31	El Mehdi El Rhazouani	Morocco	B	7.49	7.60	7.58	7.60	
32	Richard Duncan	Canada	A	7.33	X	7.60	7.60	
33	Hatem Mersal	Egypt	A	7.59	X	X	7.59	
34	Mark Anthony Awere	Ghana	B	7.16	7.36	7.57	7.57	
35	Arnaud Casquette	Mauritius	B	X	7.21	7.57	7.57	
36	Siniša Ergotic	Croatia	B	7.34	X	7.53	7.53	
37	Erik Nijs	Belgium	A	7.33	7.52	X	7.52	
38	Ian Lowe	Canada	B	7.51	7.48	7.36	7.51	
39	Konstantinos Koukodimos	Greece	B	X	7.44	X	7.44	
40	Lao Jianfeng	China	B	7.26	7.41	7.33	7.41	
41	Georges Téko Folligan	Togo	B	X	7.40	X	7.40	
42	Mesut Yavas	Turkey	B	7.34	7.35	6.03	7.35	
43	Nélson Carlos Ferreira	Brazil	B	5.81	X	7.32	7.32	
44	Shirak Poghosyan	Armenia	B	7.24	7.10	X	7.24	
45	Rustam Khusnutdinov	Uzbekistan	A	7.24	X	X	7.24	
46	Wendell Williams	Trinidad and Tobago	A	X	X	7.22	7.22	
—	Rai Sanjay Khumar	India	A	X	—	—	No mark	
—	Daisuke Watanabe	Japan	B	X	X	X	No mark	
—	Sung Hee-Jun	South Korea	A	X	X	X	No mark	
—	Abdul Rahman Al-Nubi	Qatar	A	X	X	X	No mark	
—	Stephan Louw	Namibia	A	X	X	X	No mark	
—	Dimítrios Serélis	Greece	A	X	X	X	No mark	
—	Liu Honglin	China	A	X	X	X	No mark	

=== Final ===
The final was held on 28 September 2000.

Rank	Athlete	Nation	1	2	3	4	5	6	Distance
1st place, gold medalist(s)	Iván Pedroso	Cuba	X	8.34	X	8.41	X	8.55	8.55
2nd place, silver medalist(s)	Jai Taurima	Australia	X	8.18	8.34	8.40	8.49 AR	8.28	8.49
3rd place, bronze medalist(s)	Roman Shchurenko	Ukraine	7.76	X	8.14	X	X	8.31	8.31
4	Olexiy Lukashevych	Ukraine	8.08	X	X	8.22	8.26	X	8.26
5	Kofi Amoah Prah	Germany	7.84	X	8.19	7.95	X	7.86	8.19
6	Peter Burge	Australia	7.80	8.06	7.93	7.96	8.15	8.11	8.15
7	Luis Méliz	Cuba	7.97	7.94	8.08	X	7.82	X	8.08
8	Dwight Phillips	United States	X	7.90	8.06	X	X	X	8.06
9	Bogdan Tarus	Romania	8.00	7.93	X	Did not advance			8.00
10	Carlos Calado	Portugal	7.94	7.85	7.77	Did not advance			7.94
11	Petar Dachev	Bulgaria	7.80	X	7.70	Did not advance			7.80
12	Vladimir Malyavin	Russia	X	X	7.67	Did not advance			7.67
