= 1997 European Athletics U23 Championships – Men's long jump =

The men's long jump event at the 1997 European Athletics U23 Championships was held in Turku, Finland, on 12 and 13 July 1997.

== Medalists ==
| Gold | Carlos Calado; Portugal |
| Silver | Kiril Sosunov; Russia |
| Bronze | Aleksey Lukasevich; Ukraine |

== Results ==
=== Final ===
13 July

| Rank | Name | Nationality | Attempts | | | | | | Result | Notes |
| Rank | Name | Nationality | 1 | 2 | 3 | 4 | 5 | 6 | Result | Notes |
|---|---|---|---|---|---|---|---|---|---|---|
| 1st place, gold medalist(s) | Carlos Calado | Portugal | x | 7.85 (w: 0.3 m/s) | 8.32 w (w: 2.3 m/s) | 8.30 (w: 1.0 m/s) | 7.78 (w: -0.5 m/s) | 8.12 (w: -0.7 m/s) | 8.32 w (w: 2.3 m/s) | |
| 2nd place, silver medalist(s) | Kiril Sosunov | Russia | 8.30 (w: 1.0 m/s) | x | x | x | 5.96 (w: 1.4 m/s) | x | 8.30 (w: 1.0 m/s) | |
| 3rd place, bronze medalist(s) | Aleksey Lukasevich | Ukraine | 7.95 (w: 1.2 m/s) | 8.09 w (w: 2.5 m/s) | 7.75 (w: 0.4 m/s) | x | x | 7.93 w (w: 2.1 m/s) | 8.09 w (w: 2.5 m/s) | |
| 4 | Bogdan Țăruș | Romania | 7.93 (w: 1.5 m/s) | 7.96 (w: 0.2 m/s) | x | 7.92 (w: 1.1 m/s) | 7.92 (w: 0.9 m/s) | 7.88 (w: 0.4 m/s) | 7.96 (w: 0.2 m/s) | |
| 5 | Roman Shchurenko | Ukraine | 7.94 (w: 0.9 m/s) | x | x | x | 7.57 (w: 0.7 m/s) | x | 7.94 (w: 0.9 m/s) | |
| 6 | Diego Boschiero | Italy | 7.61 (w: 1.6 m/s) | 7.54 w (w: 2.7 m/s) | 7.50 (w: -0.6 m/s) | 7.52 (w: 1.4 m/s) | 7.55 (w: 1.2 m/s) | 7.53 (w: 0.3 m/s) | 7.61 (w: 1.6 m/s) | |
| 7 | Anastasios Makrynikolas | Greece | 7.54 (w: 1.5 m/s) | 7.54 (w: 1.9 m/s) | x | 7.41 (w: 0.8 m/s) | x | 7.15 (w: 0.6 m/s) | 7.54 (w: 1.5 m/s) | |
| 8 | Marko Rajić | Yugoslavia | 7.52 w (w: 3.0 m/s) | 6.96 (w: 0.2 m/s) | 5.70 (w: 1.4 m/s) | x | 7.23 (w: -0.3 m/s) | 7.49 (w: 0.9 m/s) | 7.52 w (w: 3.0 m/s) | |
| 9 | Grzegorz Marciniszyn | Poland | 7.51 (w: 0.4 m/s) | 5.62 (w: 1.1 m/s) | 7.50 (w: 1.0 m/s) | | | | 7.51 (w: 0.4 m/s) | |
| 10 | Niels Kruller | Netherlands | 5.83 w (w: 2.8 m/s) | 7.50 (w: 1.4 m/s) | x | | | | 7.50 (w: 1.4 m/s) | |
| 11 | Michael Hessek | Germany | 7.10 (w: -0.8 m/s) | 7.47 (w: 1.9 m/s) | x | | | | 7.47 (w: 1.9 m/s) | |
| | Tomas Bardauskas | Lithuania | x | x | x | | | | NM | |

=== Qualifications ===
12 July
Qualify: first to 12 to the Final

==== Group A ====
| Rank | Name | Nationality | Result | Notes |
|---|---|---|---|---|
| 1 | Carlos Calado | Portugal | 7.75 (w: -0.6 m/s) | Q |
| 2 | Tomas Bardauskas | Lithuania | 7.64 (w: -1.9 m/s) | Q |
| 3 | Anastasios Makrynikolas | Greece | 7.61 (w: -0.2 m/s) | Q |
| 4 | Roman Shchurenko | Ukraine | 7.59 (w: -1.3 m/s) | Q |
| 5 | Grzegorz Marciniszyn | Poland | 7.48 (w: -1.7 m/s) | Q |
| 6 | Michael Hessek | Germany | 7.48 (w: -1.2 m/s) | Q |
| 7 | Diego Boschiero | Italy | 7.46 (w: -1.0 m/s) | Q |
| 8 | Sergey Zinovyev | Russia | 7.22 (w: -1.0 m/s) | |
| | Laurent Sbeghen | France | NM | |
| | Renos Kolokotronis | Cyprus | NM | |

==== Group B ====
| Rank | Name | Nationality | Result | Notes |
|---|---|---|---|---|
| 1 | Kiril Sosunov | Russia | 7.95 (w: -0.6 m/s) | Q |
| 2 | Bogdan Țăruș | Romania | 7.66 (w: 0.3 m/s) | Q |
| 3 | Niels Kruller | Netherlands | 7.55 (w: 0.3 m/s) | Q |
| 4 | Aleksey Lukasevich | Ukraine | 7.51 (w: -0.8 m/s) | Q |
| 5 | Marko Rajić | Yugoslavia | 7.46 (w: -1.2 m/s) | Q |
| 6 | Krzysztof Łuczak | Poland | 7.45 (w: -1.3 m/s) | |
| 7 | Martin Löbel | Austria | 7.34 (w: -1.0 m/s) | |
| 8 | Peter Häggström | Sweden | 7.31 (w: -1.5 m/s) | |
| 9 | Meruzhan Sargisyan | Armenia | 7.00 (w: -2.1 m/s) | |
| 10 | Justin N'Koumazok | France | 6.96 (w: -2.1 m/s) | |
| 11 | Kaloyan Lidanski | Bulgaria | 6.79 (w: -1.1 m/s) | |

== Participation ==
According to an unofficial count, 21 athletes from 17 countries participated in the event.

- Armenia (1)
- Austria (1)
- Bulgaria (1)
- Cyprus (1)
- France (2)
- Germany (1)
- Greece (1)
- Italy (1)
- Lithuania (1)
- Netherlands (1)
- Poland (2)
- Portugal (1)
- Romania (1)
- Russia (2)
- Sweden (1)
- Ukraine (2)
- Yugoslavia (1)
