= 1997 World Championships in Athletics – Men's long jump =

These are the official results of the Men's Long Jump event at the 1997 IAAF World Championships in Athens, Greece. There were a total number of 39 participating athletes, with two qualifying groups and the final held on Tuesday August 5, 1997.

== Medalists ==
Gold	Iván Pedroso; Cuba (CUB)
Silver	Erick Walder; United States (USA)
Bronze	Kirill Sosunov; Russia (RUS)

== Qualifying round ==
- Held on Sunday 1997-08-03

RANK	GROUP A	DISTANCE
1.	Maurice Wignall (JAM)	8.09 m
2.	Erick Walder (USA)	8.05 m
3.	Nelson Ferreira (BRA)	8.00 m
4.	Lao Jianfeng (CHN)	7.99 m
5.	Bogdan Tudor (ROM)	7.98 m
6.	Kirill Sosunov (RUS)	7.96 m
7.	Masaki Morinaga (JPN)	7.93 m
8.	Carlos Calado (POR)	7.92 m
9.	Olexiy Lukashevych (UKR)	7.90 m
10.	Konstantinos Koukodimos (GRE)	7.87 m
11.	Tomas Bardauskas (LTU)	7.75 m
12.	Grzegorz Marciniszyn (POL)	7.69 m
13.	Raúl Fernández (ESP)	7.62 m
14.	Elston Shaw (BLZ)	7.21 m
15.	Victor Shabangu (SWZ)	7.18 m
16.	Richard Duncan (CAN)	7.17 m
17.	Joe Greene (USA)	7.15 m
—	Gregor Cankar (SLO)	NM
—	Kader Klouchi (FRA)	NM

RANK	GROUP B	DISTANCE
1.	Iván Pedroso (CUB)	8.11 m
2.	Cheikh Tidiane Touré (SEN)	8.09 m
3.	James Beckford (JAM)	8.03 m
4.	Kevin Dilworth (USA)	7.96 m
5.	Aleksandr Glavatskiy (BLR)	7.94 m
6.	Emmanuel Bangué (FRA)	7.93 m
7.	Tan Zhengze (CHN)	7.92 m
8.	Nobuharu Asahara (JPN)	7.88 m
9.	Bogdan Tarus (ROM)	7.87 m
10.	Mattias Sunneborn (SWE)	7.72 m
11.	Marko Rajić (YUG)	7.70 m
12.	Younes Moudrik (MAR)	7.66 m
13.	Robert Emmiyan (ARM)	7.65 m
14.	Andrey Ignatov (RUS)	7.64 m
15.	Dimitrios Filindras (GRE)	7.63 m
16.	Hee-Jun SUNG (KOR)	7.63 m
17.	Keita Cline (IVB)	7.23 m
18.	Hui-Fang Nai (TPE)	7.05 m
—	Dimitrios Chatzopoulos (GRE)	NM
—	Krzysztof Łuczak (POL)	NM

== Final ==
Rank	Athlete	Attempts						Distance	Note
Rank	Athlete	1	2	3	4	5	6	Distance	Note
1st place, gold medalist(s)	Iván Pedroso (CUB)	8.42	X	X	X	X	7.60	8.42 m	SB
Silver medal	Erick Walder (USA)	8.29	8.15	8.29	8.36	8.30	8.38	8.38 m	SB
Bronze medal	Kirill Sosunov (RUS)	8.04	7.89	8.05	8.12	7.83	8.18	8.18 m	SB
4	James Beckford (JAM)	X	8.07	7.92	8.14	6.62	7.85	8.14 m	SB
5	Nelson Ferreira (BRA)	7.97	X	8.04	X	6.63	X	8.04 m	SB
6	Aleksandr Glavatskiy (BLR)	7.98	6.99	7.90	8.03	X	X	8.03 m	SB
7	Cheikh Tidiane Touré (SEN)	7.81	7.98	7.92	7.98	7.98	7.91	7.98 m	
8	Kevin Dilworth (USA)	7.88	X	X	X	X	X	7.88 m	
9	Masaki Morinaga (JPN)	7.70	7.72	7.86				7.86 m	
10	Lao Jianfeng (CHN)	7.76	X	7.59				7.76 m	
11	Bogdan Tudor (ROM)	7.66	7.51	7.65				7.66 m	
—	Maurice Wignall (JAM)	X	X	X				NM	

== See also ==
- 1994 Men's European Championships Long Jump
- 1996 Men's Olympic Long Jump
- 1998 Men's European Championships Long Jump
