= 1998 European Athletics Indoor Championships – Men's long jump =

The men's long jump event at the 1998 European Athletics Indoor Championships was held on 27–28 February.

== Medalists ==
Gold	Silver	Bronze
Olexiy Lukashevych; Ukraine	Carlos Calado; Portugal	Emmanuel Bangué; France

== Results ==
=== Qualification ===
Qualification performance: 7.80 (Q) or at least 12 best performers (q) advanced to the final.

Rank	Group	Athlete	Nationality	#1	#2	#3	Result	Notes
1	B	Kader Klouchi	France	7.92			7.92	Q
2	A	Olexiy Lukashevych	Ukraine	7.89			7.89	Q
3	B	Milan Kovar	Czech Republic	7.55	7.85		7.85	Q
4	A	Emmanuel Bangué	France	7.71	7.76	–	7.76	q
5	B	Konstantinos Koukodimos	Greece	7.40	7.43	7.65	7.65	q
6	B	Yago Lamela	Spain	x	7.61	7.63	7.63	q
7	A	Carlos Calado	Portugal	7.61	7.59	x	7.61	q
8	A	Mattias Sunneborn	Sweden	7.61	–	–	7.61	q
9	A	Romuald Ducros	France	7.58	7.56	x	7.58	q
10	A	Kofi Amoah Prah	Germany	7.55	7.50	7.43	7.55	q
11	A	Robert Emmiyan	Armenia	7.30	7.50	7.55	7.55	q
12	B	Aleksey Musikhin	Russia	7.52	7.44	7.40	7.52	q
13	B	Peter Haggström	Sweden	7.24	x	7.42	7.42	
14	A	Raúl Fernández	Spain	x	7.10	7.41	7.41	
15	B	Esteve Martín	Andorra	7.15	x	7.07	7.15	

=== Final ===
Rank	Athlete	Nationality	#1	#2	#3	#4	#5	#6	Result	Notes
1st place, gold medalist(s)	Olexiy Lukashevych	Ukraine	7.78	x	8.06	x	x	x	8.06	
2nd place, silver medalist(s)	Carlos Calado	Portugal	x	8.05	7.97	8.04	7.98	8.01	8.05	
3rd place, bronze medalist(s)	Emmanuel Bangué	France	8.05	x	7.87	x	6.92	7.92	8.05	
4	Aleksey Musikhin	Russia	7.60	7.80	8.00	x	6.97	x	8.00	
5	Yago Lamela	Spain	7.78	7.76	7.86	7.87	7.68	7.95	7.95	
6	Romuald Ducros	France	x	7.70	7.72	7.79	7.77	7.84	7.84	
7	Kader Klouchi	France	x	x	7.84	x	x	x	7.84	
8	Konstantinos Koukodimos	Greece	7.74	7.68	7.66	x	7.63	–	7.74	
9	Mattias Sunneborn	Sweden	7.38	7.64	7.68				7.68	
10	Milan Kovar	Czech Republic	x	7.66	x				7.66	
11	Kofi Amoah Prah	Germany	x	7.49	7.56				7.56	
12	Robert Emmiyan	Armenia	7.53	7.47	x				7.53	
