= 1998 European Athletics Championships – Men's long jump =

Men's long jump at the European Athletics Championships

The men's long jump at the 1998 European Athletics Championships was held at the Népstadion on 18 and 19 August.

== Medalists ==
Gold	Kirill Sosunov; Russia
Silver	Bogdan Țăruș; Romania
Bronze	Petar Dachev; Bulgaria

== Results ==
KEY:	q	Fastest non-qualifiers	Q	Qualified	NR	National record	PB	Personal best	SB	Seasonal best

=== Qualification ===
Qualification: Qualification Performance 8.05 (Q) or at least 12 best performers advance to the final.

Rank	Group	Athlete	Nationality	#1	#2	#3	Result	Notes
1	A	Kirill Sosunov	Russia				8.14	Q
2	B	Gregor Cankar	Slovenia				8.07	Q
3	A	Kofi Amoah Prah	Germany				7.95	q, PB
4	B	Simone Bianchi	Italy				7.91	q
5	A	Paolo Camossi	Italy				7.90	q
6	B	Emmanuel Bangué	France				7.88	q
7	B	Kader Klouchi	France				7.86	q
8	B	Mattias Sunneborn	Sweden				7.84	q
9	A	Petar Dachev	Bulgaria				7.83	q
10	A	Konstadinos Koukodimos	Greece				7.82	q
11	B	Bogdan Țăruș	Romania				7.81	q
12	B	Yago Lamela	Spain	7.74	7.67	7.77	7.77	q
13	B	Aleksandr Glavatskiy	Belarus				7.76	
13	B	Stanislav Tarasenko	Russia	7.76			7.76	
15	B	Roman Shchurenko	Ukraine				7.75	
16	A	Tomas Bardauskas	Lithuania	x			7.74	
16	B	Milan Kovar	Czech Republic				7.74	
16	B	Konstantin Krause	Germany				7.74	
19	A	Olexiy Lukashevych	Ukraine				7.72	
19	B	Dimitrios Chatzopoulos	Greece	7.72			7.72	
21	A	Aleksey Musikhin	Russia				7.69	
22	A	Thorsten Heide	Germany				7.68	
22	A	Michael Loria	France	7.16			7.68	
24	A	Nathan Morgan	Great Britain	x	7.67		7.67	
25	A	Bogdan Tudor	Romania				7.66	
26	A	Danial Jahić	Yugoslavia				7.63	
27	A	Martin Lobel	Austria				7.62	
28	A	Peter Häggström	Sweden				7.59	
29	A	Siniša Ergotić	Croatia				7.57	
30	A	Raúl Fernández	Spain	7.56	x	7.52	7.56	
30	B	Grzegorz Marciniszyn	Poland				7.56	
32	B	Steven Phillips	Great Britain	x	7.46	7.51	7.51	
33	A	Otto Karki	Finland				7.51	
34	B	Robert Emmiyan	Armenia	7.43			7.43	
35	B	Galin Georgiev	Bulgaria				7.30	
36	B	Dimitros Filidras	Greece				7.29	
37	A	Carlos Castelbranco	Portugal				6.68	

=== Final ===
Rank	Athlete	Nationality	#1	#2	#3	#4	#5	#6	Result	Notes
1st place, gold medalist(s)	Kirill Sosunov	Russia	8.14	8.12	8.28	7.98	8.03	7.79	8.28	
2nd place, silver medalist(s)	Bogdan Țăruș	Romania	7.96	7.85	8.21	8.14	8.13	8.04	8.21	SB
3rd place, bronze medalist(s)	Petar Dachev	Bulgaria	8.06	x	x	7.95	x	5.32	8.06	
4	Simone Bianchi	Italy	7.67	7.92	x	x	7.97	8.02	8.02	SB
5	Mattias Sunneborn	Sweden	7.75	7.72	8.01	7.73	7.88	7.83	8.01	SB
6	Gregor Cankar	Slovenia	7.83	7.64	8.00	7.90	7.90	x	8.00	
7	Paolo Camossi	Italy	7.71	7.66	7.82	x	7.98	x	7.98	
8	Yago Lamela	Spain	7.92	x	7.89	7.68	7.93	x	7.93	
9	Emmanuel Bangué	France	x	7.79	x				7.79	
10	Konstadinos Koukodimos	Greece	7.77	x	x				7.77	
11	Kofi Amoah Prah	Germany	x	x	7.76				7.76	
12	Kader Klouchi	France	x	7.61	x				7.61	
