= 1994 World Junior Championships in Athletics – Men's triple jump =

The men's triple jump event at the 1994 World Junior Championships in Athletics was held in Lisbon, Portugal, at Estádio Universitário de Lisboa on 23 and 24 July.

== Medalists ==
Gold	Larry Achike; United Kingdom
Silver	Lenard Cobb; United States
Bronze	Ronald Servius; France

== Results ==
=== Final ===
24 July

Rank	Name	Nationality	Attempts						Result	Notes
Rank	Name	Nationality	1	2	3	4	5	6	Result	Notes
1st place, gold medalist(s)	Larry Achike	United Kingdom	16.53 (w: +0.7 m/s)	x	-	16.67 w (w: +2.4 m/s)	-	x	16.67 w (w: +2.4 m/s)	
2nd place, silver medalist(s)	Lenard Cobb	United States	15.49 (w: +0.4 m/s)	16.01 (w: +1.4 m/s)	x	16.65 (w: +1.0 m/s)	16.27 (w: +1.6 m/s)	16.12 (w: +0.6 m/s)	16.65 (w: +1.0 m/s)	
3rd place, bronze medalist(s)	Ronald Servius	France	15.57 (w: +1.4 m/s)	15.68 (w: +1.2 m/s)	15.65 (w: +1.1 m/s)	16.55 w (w: +2.3 m/s)	15.95 (w: +1.6 m/s)	15.58 w (w: +4.0 m/s)	16.55 w (w: +2.3 m/s)	
4	Sergey Izmaylov	Ukraine	16.40 (w: +1.2 m/s)	15.90 (w: +0.5 m/s)	16.42 w (w: +3.5 m/s)	16.13 (w: +1.9 m/s)	15.83 (w: +1.9 m/s)	16.11 (w: +1.4 m/s)	16.42 w (w: +3.5 m/s)	
5	César Ríos	Cuba	15.62 w (w: +2.1 m/s)	x	16.24 (w: +1.7 m/s)	14.51 (w: +0.7 m/s)	15.98 (w: +1.5 m/s)	x	16.24 (w: +1.7 m/s)	
6	Carlos Calado	Portugal	16.09 (w: +1.0 m/s)	15.82 (w: +1.2 m/s)	15.67 (w: +1.6 m/s)	16.14 w (w: +3.2 m/s)	15.55 (w: +1.8 m/s)	x	16.14 w (w: +3.2 m/s)	
7	Vyacheslav Taranov	Russia	15.96 (w: +0.9 m/s)	15.78 (w: +2.0 m/s)	15.65 w (w: +2.5 m/s)	15.76 (w: +1.5 m/s)	15.73 w (w: +2.2 m/s)	16.05 (w: +1.9 m/s)	16.05 (w: +1.9 m/s)	
8	Jason Wight	Australia	15.33 (w: +1.2 m/s)	15.70 w (w: +2.2 m/s)	15.64 (w: +0.3 m/s)	x	15.70 (w: +1.1 m/s)	15.96 (w: +0.6 m/s)	15.96 (w: +0.6 m/s)	
9	Paweł Zdrajkowski	Poland	15.59 (w: +0.1 m/s)	15.46 (w: +1.4 m/s)	15.48 w (w: +2.7 m/s)				15.59 (w: +0.1 m/s)	
10	Marat Safiullin	Russia	14.24 (w: +1.3 m/s)	15.23 (w: -0.4 m/s)	15.56 w (w: +2.4 m/s)				15.56 w (w: +2.4 m/s)	
	Sérgio dos Santos	Brazil	x	x	-				NM	
	Allan Mortimer	Bahamas							DNS	

=== Qualifications ===
23 Jul

==== Group A ====
Rank	Name	Nationality	Attempts			Result	Notes
Rank	Name	Nationality	1	2	3	Result	Notes
1	Ronald Servius	France	15.76 (w: +1.0 m/s)	15.47 (w: -0.8 m/s)	16.38 (w: +1.0 m/s)	16.38 (w: +1.0 m/s)	Q
2	César Ríos	Cuba	x	15.77 (w: +0.7 m/s)	16.02 (w: +0.8 m/s)	16.02 (w: +0.8 m/s)	Q
3	Lenard Cobb	United States	15.97 (w: +1.3 m/s)	-	-	15.97 (w: +1.3 m/s)	Q
4	Jason Wight	Australia	15.93 (w: +0.7 m/s)	-	-	15.93 (w: +0.7 m/s)	Q
5	Carlos Calado	Portugal	15.88 (w: +1.8 m/s)	-	-	15.88 (w: +1.8 m/s)	Q
6	Sérgio dos Santos	Brazil	15.75 (w: -1.7 m/s)	x	15.81 (w: +0.7 m/s)	15.81 (w: +0.7 m/s)	Q
7	Marat Safiullin	Russia	15.37 (w: +1.3 m/s)	15.58 w (w: +2.7 m/s)	x	15.58 w (w: +2.7 m/s)	q
8	Álvaro Bartolomé	Spain	15.22 (w: +1.3 m/s)	15.34 (w: +1.3 m/s)	15.49 (w: -0.6 m/s)	15.49 (w: -0.6 m/s)	
9	Vance Clarke	Saint Kitts and Nevis	x	15.26 (w: +0.8 m/s)	15.42 (w: +0.5 m/s)	15.42 (w: +0.5 m/s)	
10	Aleksandr Tumanov	Turkmenistan	14.81 (w: +1.2 m/s)	x	15.17 (w: +1.3 m/s)	15.17 (w: +1.3 m/s)	
11	Chen Chung-Chien	Chinese Taipei	14.87 w (w: +2.2 m/s)	x	13.62 (w: +0.6 m/s)	14.87 w (w: +2.2 m/s)	
12	Krzysztof Łuczak	Poland	x	14.74 (w: +0.6 m/s)	14.82 (w: +1.6 m/s)	14.82 (w: +1.6 m/s)	
13	Khaled Farhan	Kuwait	x	14.80 (w: +2.0 m/s)	x	14.80 (w: +2.0 m/s)	

==== Group B ====
Rank	Name	Nationality	Attempts			Result	Notes
Rank	Name	Nationality	1	2	3	Result	Notes
1	Allen Mortimer	Bahamas	16.37 (w: +1.1 m/s)	16.35 (w: +1.4 m/s)	x	16.37 (w: +1.4 m/s)	Q
2	Vyacheslav Taranov	Russia	15.93 (w: +1.4 m/s)	-	-	15.93 (w: +1.4 m/s)	Q
3	Paweł Zdrajkowski	Poland	15.88 w (w: +2.1 m/s)	-	-	15.88 w (w: +2.1 m/s)	Q
4	Larry Achike	United Kingdom	15.86 (w: +1.2 m/s)	-	-	15.86 (w: +1.2 m/s)	Q
5	victor Sonovk	Ukraine	15.53 w (w: +2.8 m/s)	x	x	15.53 w (w: +2.8 m/s)	q
6	Yago Lamela	Spain	15.34 (w: +0.4 m/s)	15.46 (w: +1.5 m/s)	15.47 (w: +0.1 m/s)	15.47 (w: +0.1 m/s)	
7	Walter Landry	United States	15.45 (w: +1.1 m/s)	15.28 (w: +0.8 m/s)	15.18 (w: +0.7 m/s)	15.45 (w: +1.1 m/s)	
8	Djeke Mambo	Zaire	15.37 (w: +0.6 m/s)	x	x	15.37 (w: +0.6 m/s)	
9	Nabil Adamou	Algeria	14.77 (w: +0.9 m/s)	15.15 w (w: +2.1 m/s)	15.22 (w: +1.1 m/s)	15.22 (w: +1.1 m/s)	
10	Gustavo Pinto	Brazil	15.17 (w: +0.7 m/s)	14.95 (w: +1.0 m/s)	-	15.17 (w: +0.7 m/s)	
11	Li Wanlong	China	14.84 w (w: +2.1 m/s)	14.95 (w: +1.3 m/s)	-	14.95 (w: +1.3 m/s)	
12	Vladimir Rogov	Turkmenistan	14.92 (w: +0.7 m/s)	14.27 (w: +1.1 m/s)	x	14.92 (w: +0.7 m/s)	
13	Ivan Vuković	Croatia	13.76 (w: +0.8 m/s)	x	-	13.76 (w: +0.8 m/s)	

== Participation ==
According to an unofficial count, 26 athletes from 20 countries participated in the event.

- Algeria (1)
- Australia (1)
- Bahamas (1)
- Brazil (2)
- China (1)
- Chinese Taipei (1)
- Croatia (1)
- Cuba (1)
- France (1)
- Kuwait (1)
- Poland (2)
- Portugal (1)
- Russia (2)
- Saint Kitts and Nevis (1)
- Spain (2)
- Turkmenistan (2)
- Ukraine (1)
- United Kingdom (1)
- United States (2)
- Zaire (1)
