= 1999 World Championships in Athletics – Men's long jump =

These are the official results of the Men's Long Jump event at the 1999 World Championships in Seville, Spain. There were a total number of 45 participating athletes, with the final held on Saturday 28 August 1999.

== Medalists ==
Gold	Iván Pedroso; Cuba (CUB)
Silver	Yago Lamela; Spain (ESP)
Bronze	Gregor Cankar; Slovenia (SLO)

== Schedule ==
- All times are Central European Time (UTC+1)

Qualification Round
Group A	Group B
26.08.1999 – 18:50h	26.08.1999 – 18:50h
Final Round
28.08.1999 – 19:05h

== Abbreviations ==
- All results shown are in metres

Q	automatic qualification
q	qualification by rank
DNS	did not start
NM	no mark
WR	world record
AR	area record
NR	national record
PB	personal best
SB	season best

== Qualification ==
- Held on Thursday 26 August 1999

RANK	GROUP A	DISTANCE
1.	Gregor Cankar (SLO)	8.23 m
2.	Yago Lamela (ESP)	8.15 m
3.	Kevin Dilworth (USA)	8.09 m
4.	Hussein Taher Al-Sabee (KSA)	8.06 m
5.	Ciaran McDonagh (IRL)	8.00 m
6.	Emmanuel Bangué (FRA)	7.92 m
7.	Younés Moudrik (MAR)	7.91 m
8.	Shane Hair (AUS)	7.90 m
9.	Konstantinos Koukodimos (GRE)	7.90 m
10.	Roman Shchurenko (UKR)	7.89 m
11.	Kofi Amoah Prah (GER)	7.86 m
12.	Luis Méliz (CUB)	7.85 m
13.	Ivaylo Mladenov (BUL)	7.83 m
14.	Erick Walder (USA)	7.80 m
15.	Nelson Carlos Ferreira Jr. (BRA)	7.71 m
16.	Danial Jahac (YUG)	7.68 m
17.	Richard Duncan (CAN)	7.65 m
18.	Sung Hee-Jun (KOR)	7.62 m
19.	Chen Jing (CHN)	7.61 m
20.	Mark Anthony Awere (GHA)	7.60 m
21.	Daisuke Watanabe (JPN)	7.41 m
22.	Nathan Morgan (GBR)	7.31 m

RANK	GROUP B	DISTANCE
1.	Iván Pedroso (CUB)	8.16 m
2.	Huang Le (CHN)	7.94 m
3.	Erik Nijs (BEL)	7.93 m
4.	Jai Taurima (AUS)	7.92 m
5.	Hatem Mohamed Mersal (EGY)	7.90 m
6.	Nikolay Atanasov (BUL)	7.86 m
7.	Shigeru Tagawa (JPN)	7.78 m
8.	Aleksey Lukashevich (UKR)	7.77 m
9.	Cheikh Tidiane Touré (FRA)	7.76 m
10.	Kareem Streete-Thompson (CAY)	7.75 m
11.	Carlos Calado (POR)	7.75 m
12.	Bogdan Tarus (ROM)	7.74 m
13.	Ian Lowe (CAN)	7.72 m
14.	Nicola Trentin (ITA)	7.70 m
15.	Andrey Ignatov (RUS)	7.66 m
16.	Konstantin Krause (GER)	7.61 m
17.	Kader Klouchi (FRA)	7.57 m
18.	Savante Stringfellow (USA)	7.39 m
19.	Gable Garenamotse (BOT)	7.28 m
20.	Abdurahman Al-Nubi (QAT)	7.15 m
—	Mattias Sunneborn (SWE)	DNS
—	Armen Martirosyan (ARM)	DNS
—	Masaki Morinaga (JPN)	DNS

== Final ==
Rank	Athlete	Attempts						Distance	Note
Rank	Athlete	1	2	3	4	5	6	Distance	Note
1st place, gold medalist(s)	Iván Pedroso (CUB)	8.19	8.33	8.56	—	5.74	—	8.56 m	
2nd place, silver medalist(s)	Yago Lamela (ESP)	8.34	X	X	8.40	8.09	8.39	8.40 m	
3rd place, bronze medalist(s)	Gregor Cankar (SLO)	8.20	8.32	8.09	8.36	8.07	X	8.36 m	SB
4	Jai Taurima (AUS)	X	8.12	X	X	X	8.35	8.35 m	AR
5	Shane Hair (AUS)	X	7.89	7.99	8.24	8.11	6.10	8.24 m	PB
6	Huang Le (CHN)	7.95	7.70	8.01	7.96	—	—	8.01 m	SB
7	Kevin Dilworth (USA)	7.99	8.00	7.88	7.75	7.98	7.87	8.00 m	
8	Younés Moudrik (MAR)	7.68	7.99	7.71	7.71	X	7.76	7.99 m	
9	Emmanuel Bangué (FRA)	7.94	7.84	X				7.94 m	
10	Ciaran McDonagh (IRL)	7.90	7.72	X				7.90 m	
11	Erik Nijs (BEL)	7.81	X	7.83				7.83 m	
12	Hussein Al-Sabee (KSA)	7.62	X	6.67				7.62 m	
