= 2002 European Athletics Championships – Men's long jump =

Men's long jump at the European Athletics Championships

The men's long jump at the 2002 European Athletics Championships were held at the Olympic Stadium on August 9–11.

== Medalists ==
Gold	Silver	Bronze
Olexiy Lukashevych; Ukraine	Siniša Ergotić; Croatia	Yago Lamela; Spain

== Results ==
=== Qualification ===
Qualification: Qualification Performance 7.95 (Q) or at least 12 best performers advance to the final.

Rank	Group	Athlete	Nationality	#1	#2	#3	Result	Notes
1	B	Yago Lamela	Spain	8.03			8.03	Q
2	B	Olexiy Lukashevych	Ukraine				7.97	Q
3	B	Danila Burkenya	Russia				7.95	Q
4	B	Vladimir Malyavin	Russia				7.93	q
5	A	Roman Shchurenko	Ukraine				7.89	q
6	A	Raúl Fernández	Spain	7.72	7.87	X	7.87	q
7	A	Thomas Mellin-Olsen	Norway				7.86	q
8	A	Salim Sdiri	France				7.85	q
9	A	Siniša Ergotić	Croatia				7.85	q
10	B	Chris Tomlinson	Great Britain				7.81	q
11	B	Yann Doménech	France				7.80	q
12	B	Andreas Pohle	Germany				7.73	q
13	A	Schahrlar Bigdeli	Germany				7.72	
14	B	Nicola Trentin	Italy				7.66	
15	A	Gregor Cankar	Slovenia				7.64	
16	A	Andrejs Tolstiks	Latvia				7.57	
17	A	Dmitriy Mitrofanov	Russia				7.53	
17	B	Peter Häggström	Sweden				7.53	
19	A	Anastassios Makrynikolas	Greece				7.41	
20	B	John Steffen	Denmark				7.03	
	A	Konstantinos Koukodimos	Greece	X	X	X	NM	
	A	Niklas Rorarius	Finland	X	X	X	NM	
	A	Volodimir Zyuskov	Ukraine	X	X	X	NM	
	B	Rashid Chouhal	Malta	X	X	X	NM	
	B	Petar Dachev	Bulgaria	X	X	X	NM	
	B	Louis Tsatoumas	Greece				DNS	

=== Final ===
Rank	Athlete	Nationality	#1	#2	#3	#4	#5	#6	Result	Notes
1st place, gold medalist(s)	Olexiy Lukashevych	Ukraine	X	7.96	8.08	X	X	7.68	8.08	
2nd place, silver medalist(s)	Siniša Ergotić	Croatia	7.93	X	8.00	7.93	6.13	7.84	8.00	
3rd place, bronze medalist(s)	Yago Lamela	Spain	7.93	X	7.97	X	7.55	7.99	7.99	
4	Roman Shchurenko	Ukraine	7.84	7.80	7.74	7.96	X	X	7.96	
5	Danila Burkenya	Russia	7.14	7.83	X	7.81	7.68	7.90	7.90	
6	Chris Tomlinson	Great Britain	7.78	7.27	7.70	7.38	7.59	7.74	7.78	
7	Salim Sdiri	France	7.62	7.78	X	7.55	7.61	7.65	7.78	
8	Vladimir Malyavin	Russia	7.43	X	7.73	7.36	X	7.20	7.73	
9	Raúl Fernández	Spain	X	7.69	X				7.69	
10	Yann Doménech	France	6.63	7.68	X				7.68	
11	Andreas Pohle	Germany	X	7.03	7.65				7.65	
12	Thomas Mellin-Olsen	Norway	7.30	6.89	7.57				7.57	
