= 1996 World Junior Championships in Athletics – Men's long jump =

The men's long jump event at the 1996 World Junior Championships in Athletics was held in Sydney, Australia, at International Athletic Centre on 21 and 22 August.

== Medalists ==
Gold	Aleksey Lukashevich; Ukraine
Silver	Raúl Fernández; Spain
Bronze	Nathan Morgan; United Kingdom

== Results ==
=== Final ===
22 August

Rank	Name	Nationality	Attempts						Result	Notes
Rank	Name	Nationality	1	2	3	4	5	6	Result	Notes
1st place, gold medalist(s)	Aleksey Lukashevich	Ukraine	7.57 (w: +0.4 m/s)	x	7.76 (w: -0.1 m/s)	7.53 (w: +0.1 m/s)	7.91 (w: +0.6 m/s)	x	7.91 (w: +0.6 m/s)	
2nd place, silver medalist(s)	Raúl Fernández	Spain	7.59 (w: -0.2 m/s)	7.48 (w: +0.1 m/s)	x	7.45 (w: +0.4 m/s)	x	7.75 (w: 0.0 m/s)	7.75 (w: 0.0 m/s)	
3rd place, bronze medalist(s)	Nathan Morgan	United Kingdom	7.74 (w: +1.0 m/s)	7.60 (w: +0.3 m/s)	7.38 (w: +0.5 m/s)	7.52 (w: +0.7 m/s)	x	7.47 (w: +0.4 m/s)	7.74 (w: +1.0 m/s)	
4	Yago Lamela	Spain	7.55 (w: +0.4 m/s)	7.69 (w: +0.6 m/s)	x	7.59 (w: +0.7 m/s)	7.67 (w: +0.8 m/s)	7.73 (w: +0.4 m/s)	7.73 (w: +0.4 m/s)	
5	Ranko Leskovar	Slovenia	7.68 (w: +0.6 m/s)	x	7.22 (w: -0.2 m/s)	x	7.61 (w: +0.2 m/s)	7.61 (w: +0.2 m/s)	7.68 (w: +0.6 m/s)	
6	Yann Doménech	France	7.51 (w: -0.2 m/s)	7.31 (w: +0.2 m/s)	7.68 (w: -0.1 m/s)	7.32 (w: +0.5 m/s)	7.38 (w: +0.5 m/s)	7.57 (w: +0.3 m/s)	7.68 (w: -0.1 m/s)	
7	Joan Lino Martínez	Cuba	7.59 (w: +0.1 m/s)	x	7.37 (w: +0.5 m/s)	7.39 (w: +0.9 m/s)	x	-	7.59 (w: +0.1 m/s)	
8	Younès Moudrik	Morocco	7.49 (w: +1.0 m/s)	7.48 (w: +0.2 m/s)	7.44 (w: +0.9 m/s)	7.37 (w: +0.6 m/s)	7.50 (w: +0.3 m/s)	7.51 (w: +0.6 m/s)	7.51 (w: +0.6 m/s)	
9	Vasil Gergov	Bulgaria	7.43 (w: +0.7 m/s)	7.35 (w: +0.4 m/s)	7.39 (w: +0.7 m/s)				7.43 (w: +0.7 m/s)	
10	Áron Szmuda	Slovakia	7.23 (w: +0.2 m/s)	x	7.42 (w: +0.5 m/s)				7.42 (w: +0.5 m/s)	
11	Melvin Lister	United States	x	7.12 (w: +0.2 m/s)	7.19 (w: +0.5 m/s)				7.19 (w: +0.5 m/s)	
12	Aleksey Shchukin	Kazakhstan	7.13 (w: +0.9 m/s)	x	6.91 (w: -0.3 m/s)				7.13 (w: +0.9 m/s)	

=== Qualifications ===
21 Aug

==== Group A ====
Rank	Name	Nationality	Attempts			Result	Notes
Rank	Name	Nationality	1	2	3	Result	Notes
1	Yann Doménech	France	7.03 (w: -0.5 m/s)	7.39 (w: -0.1 m/s)	x	7.69	Q
2	Yago Lamela	Spain	7.34 (w: +0.1 m/s)	7.53 (w: -0.1 m/s)	7.67 (w: -0.5 m/s)	7.67 (w: -0.5 m/s)	Q
3	Vasil Gergov	Bulgaria	7.14 (w: +0.4 m/s)	7.43 (w: +0.4 m/s)	7.67 (w: +0.9 m/s)	7.67 (w: +0.9 m/s)	Q
4	Ranko Leskovar	Slovenia	7.56 (w: 0.0 m/s)	7.13 (w: -0.4 m/s)	-	7.56 (w: 0.0 m/s)	q
5	Nathan Morgan	United Kingdom	7.51 (w: +0.5 m/s)	7.13 (w: -0.3 m/s)	-	7.51 (w: +0.5 m/s)	q
6	Áron Szmuda	Slovakia	x	7.48 (w: -0.1 m/s)	7.44 (w: 0.0 m/s)	7.48 (w: -0.1 m/s)	q
7	Younès Moudrik	Morocco	7.35 (w: -0.5 m/s)	7.35 (w: 0.0 m/s)	7.48 (w: +0.5 m/s)	7.48 (w: +0.5 m/s)	q
8	Aleksey Lukashevich	Ukraine	7.44 (w: +0.1 m/s)	7.30 (w: +0.4 m/s)	x	7.44 (w: +0.1 m/s)	q
9	Adam Connelly	Australia	7.31 (w: -0.2 m/s)	5.46 (w: -0.6 m/s)	7.39 (w: +0.9 m/s)	7.39 (w: +0.9 m/s)	
10	Bashir Yamini	United States	7.03 (w: -0.5 m/s)	7.39 (w: -0.1 m/s)	x	7.39 (w: -0.1 m/s)	
11	Luis Soto Caballero	Puerto Rico	7.11 (w: 0.0 m/s)	6.83 (w: -0.4 m/s)	7.06 (w: +0.6 m/s)	7.11 (w: 0.0 m/s)	
12	Konstadínos Vasiliádis	Greece	6.99 (w: -0.7 m/s)	7.02 (w: 0.0 m/s)	7.07 (w: +1.0 m/s)	7.07 (w: +1.0 m/s)	
13	Patrick Weimer	Germany	6.91 (w: +0.2 m/s)	7.01 (w: -0.6 m/s)	x	7.01 (w: -0.6 m/s)	
14	Juan Pedro Toledo	Mexico	6.90 (w: +0.2 m/s)	6.94 (w: -0.3 m/s)	6.62 (w: -0.6 m/s)	6.94 (w: -0.3 m/s)	
15	Gable Garenamotse	Botswana	6.60 (w: 0.0 m/s)	6.92 (w: -0.4 m/s)	6.90 (w: +1.5 m/s)	6.92 (w: -0.4 m/s)	
16	David Zhishonaya	Georgia	x	6.47 (w: +0.1 m/s)	x	6.47 (w: +0.1 m/s)	

==== Group B ====
Rank	Name	Nationality	Attempts			Result	Notes
Rank	Name	Nationality	1	2	3	Result	Notes
1	Aleksey Shchukin	Kazakhstan	7.06 (w: -0.9 m/s)	6.97 (w: -0.2 m/s)	7.59 w (w: +3.3 m/s)	7.59 w (w: +3.3 m/s)	q
2	Joan Lino Martínez	Cuba	x	7.59 (w: -0.7 m/s)	x	7.59 (w: -0.7 m/s)	q
3	Raúl Fernández	Spain	x	7.53 (w: +0.6 m/s)	7.31 (w: -0.2 m/s)	7.53 (w: +0.6 m/s)	q
4	Melvin Lister	United States	6.66 (w: -0.8 m/s)	6.98 (w: -0.6 m/s)	7.50 w (w: +2.5 m/s)	7.50 w (w: +2.5 m/s)	q
5	Dean Stevens	Australia	7.42 (w: +1.3 m/s)	7.09 (w: -0.4 m/s)	7.43 w (w: +2.6 m/s)	7.43 w (w: +2.6 m/s)	
6	Grzegorz Marciniszyn	Poland	7.18 (w: -1.2 m/s)	7.22 (w: +0.9 m/s)	7.43 w (w: +3.2 m/s)	7.43 w (w: +3.2 m/s)	
7	Huang Le	China	x	7.07 (w: -0.6 m/s)	7.43 (w: +0.1 m/s)	7.43 (w: +0.1 m/s)	
8	Abdul Rahman Al-Nubi	Qatar	7.33 (w: 0.0 m/s)	-	-	7.33 (w: 0.0 m/s)	
9	Sergey Kubyshkin	Russia	7.28 (w: +0.3 m/s)	7.23 (w: -0.2 m/s)	7.18 (w: +1.6 m/s)	7.28 (w: +0.3 m/s)	
10	Anastasios Makrinikólas	Greece	7.24 (w: -0.2 m/s)	7.23 (w: -0.4 m/s)	7.19 (w: +0.9 m/s)	7.24 (w: -0.2 m/s)	
11	Paris Meletiou	Cyprus	7.21 (w: -0.1 m/s)	6.79 (w: +0.6 m/s)	x	7.21 (w: -0.1 m/s)	
12	Staņislavs Olijars	Latvia	5.95 (w: -0.3 m/s)	7.06 (w: +0.3 m/s)	7.19 (w: +1.3 m/s)	7.19 (w: +1.3 m/s)	
13	Dan Bibi	Seychelles	x	6.76 (w: -1.2 m/s)	7.17 (w: +1.3 m/s)	7.17 (w: +1.3 m/s)	
14	Ban Ki-Hoon	South Korea	6.95 (w: -1.8 m/s)	7.04 (w: 0.0 m/s)	7.14 w (w: +2.4 m/s)	7.14 w (w: +2.4 m/s)	
15	Danial Jahic	FR Yugoslavia	x	x	7.10 (w: -1.2 m/s)	7.10 (w: -1.2 m/s)	
16	Mervyn Swaby	Jamaica	x	6.78 (w: -1.4 m/s)	x	6.78 (w: -1.4 m/s)	
17	Noam Rabinovitch	Israel	6.66 (w: +0.7 m/s)	x	6.68 w (w: +2.5 m/s)	6.68 w (w: +2.5 m/s)	
18	Pierre Doutau	France	6.09 (w: +0.7 m/s)	x	x	6.09 (w: +0.7 m/s)	
	Primoz Oberauner	Slovenia	x	x	x	NM	

== Participation ==
According to an unofficial count, 35 athletes from 29 countries participated in the event.

- Australia (2)
- Botswana (1)
- Bulgaria (1)
- China (1)
- Cuba (1)
- Cyprus (1)
- France (2)
- Georgia (1)
- Germany (1)
- Greece (2)
- Israel (1)
- Jamaica (1)
- Kazakhstan (1)
- Latvia (1)
- Mexico (1)
- Morocco (1)
- Poland (1)
- Puerto Rico (1)
- Qatar (1)
- Russia (1)
- Seychelles (1)
- Slovakia (1)
- Slovenia (2)
- South Korea (1)
- Spain (2)
- Ukraine (1)
- United Kingdom (1)
- United States (2)
- FR Yugoslavia (1)
