= 1997 European Athletics U23 Championships – Men's triple jump =

The men's triple jump event at the 1997 European Athletics U23 Championships was held in Turku, Finland, on 11 July 1997.

== Medalists ==
Gold	Vyacheslav Taranov; Russia
Silver	Marat Safiullin; Russia
Bronze	Tayo Erogbogbo; Great Britain

== Results ==
=== Final ===
11 July

Rank	Name	Nationality	Attempts						Result	Notes
Rank	Name	Nationality	1	2	3	4	5	6	Result	Notes
1st place, gold medalist(s)	Vyacheslav Taranov	Russia	16.53 (w: -2.8 m/s)	16.95 (w: -1.6 m/s)	x	16.85 (w: -1.0 m/s)	x	16.34 (w: -1.0 m/s)	16.95 (w: -1.6 m/s)	
2nd place, silver medalist(s)	Marat Safiullin	Russia	16.00 (w: -2.3 m/s)	15.83 (w: -1.0 m/s)	15.84 (w: -3.1 m/s)	16.00 (w: -1.5 m/s)	15.94 (w: -2.3 m/s)	16.29 (w: 1.4 m/s)	16.29 (w: 1.4 m/s)	
3rd place, bronze medalist(s)	Tayo Erogbogbo	Great Britain	15.86 (w: -1.8 m/s)	x	15.19 (w: -2.3 m/s)	15.98 (w: -2.3 m/s)	x	16.28 (w: -1.1 m/s)	16.28 (w: -1.1 m/s)	
4	Dmitriy Vasilyev	Belarus	15.09 (w: -2.8 m/s)	16.21 (w: -0.8 m/s)	x	x	x	16.06 (w: -1.9 m/s)	16.21 (w: -0.8 m/s)	
5	Ronald Servius	France	15.81 (w: -2.0 m/s)	15.52 (w: -1.9 m/s)	15.86 (w: -1.0 m/s)	15.50 (w: -2.4 m/s)	15.89 (w: -1.0 m/s)	16.17 (w: -0.9 m/s)	16.17 (w: -0.9 m/s)	
6	Álvaro Bartolomé	Spain	x	15.27 (w: -1.6 m/s)	15.93 (w: -1.2 m/s)	16.16 (w: -1.3 m/s)	x	15.93 (w: -1.6 m/s)	16.16 (w: -1.3 m/s)	
7	Sergey Izmaylov	Ukraine	15.74 (w: -2.5 m/s)	x	16.02 (w: -2.8 m/s)	15.99 (w: -3.0 m/s)	x	x	16.02 (w: -2.8 m/s)	
8	Colomba Fofana	France	15.46 (w: -3.8 m/s)	15.83 (w: -1.1 m/s)	14.65 (w: -1.8 m/s)	15.74 (w: -1.1 m/s)	15.72 (w: -1.2 m/s)	x	15.83 (w: -1.1 m/s)	
9	Conny Malm	Sweden	15.58 (w: -1.6 m/s)	x	15.82 (w: -0.5 m/s)				15.82 (w: -0.5 m/s)	
10	Paweł Zdrajkowski	Poland	15.68 (w: -2.8 m/s)	x	15.49 (w: -0.6 m/s)				15.68 (w: -2.8 m/s)	
11	Fabrizio Donato	Italy	15.03 (w: -2.8 m/s)	x	15.55 (w: -2.0 m/s)				15.55 (w: -2.0 m/s)	
12	Marco Canino	Italy	15.51 (w: -1.9 m/s)	15.28 (w: -1.3 m/s)	15.24 (w: -1.3 m/s)				15.51 (w: -1.9 m/s)	
13	Tobias Pöss	Germany	15.35 (w: -2.0 m/s)	14.94 (w: -1.3 m/s)	14.96 (w: -0.6 m/s)				15.35 (w: -2.0 m/s)	
14	Alen Topolovčan	Slovenia	15.15 (w: 0.4 m/s)	15.14 (w: -1.9 m/s)	14.64 (w: -2.1 m/s)				15.15 (w: 0.4 m/s)	
15	Ionut Esanu	Romania	x	13.92 (w: -1.8 m/s)	x				13.92 (w: -1.8 m/s)	

== Participation ==
According to an unofficial count, 15 athletes from 12 countries participated in the event.

- Belarus (1)
- France (2)
- Germany (1)
- Great Britain (1)
- Italy (2)
- Poland (1)
- Romania (1)
- Russia (2)
- Slovenia (1)
- Spain (1)
- Sweden (1)
- Ukraine (1)
