= Raúl Fernández (long jumper) =

Spanish long jumper

Personal information
- Nationality: Spanish
- Born: 8 March 1978 (age 48) Brenes, Spain
- Height: 1.77 m (5 ft 10 in)
- Weight: 71 kg (157 lb)

Sport
- Sport: Athletics
- Event: long jump
Medal record
Representing Spain
Men's Athletics
European Indoor Championships
Gold medal – first place	2002 Vienna	Long jump

Raúl Fernández Pavón (born 8 March 1978 in Brenes) is a former Spanish athlete specializing in the long jump. His biggest success is winning the gold medal during the 2002 European Indoor Championships in Vienna.

== Competition record ==
Year	Competition	Venue	Position	Notes
Representing Spain
1996	World Junior Championships	Sydney, Australia	2nd	7.75 m (wind: 0.0 m/s)
1997	World Indoor Championships	Paris, France	31st (q)	7.18 m
1997	European Junior Championships	Ljubljana, Slovenia	2nd	7.90 m
1997	World Championships	Athens, Greece	29th (q)	7.62 m
1998	European Indoor Championships	Valencia, Spain	14th (q)	7.41 m
1998	Ibero-American Championships	Lisbon, Portugal	2nd	8.05 m
1998	European Championships	Budapest, Hungary	30th (q)	7.56 m
2001	World Championships	Edmonton, Canada	23rd (q)	7.47 m
2001	Mediterranean Games	Radès, Tunisia	9th	7.61 m (w)
2002	European Indoor Championships	Vienna, Austria	1st	8.22 m
2002	European Championships	Munich, Germany	9th	7.69 m
2003	World Indoor Championships	Birmingham, United Kingdom	9th (q)	7.80 m

== Personal bests ==
- Long jump (outdoor) - 8.26 m (Monachil, 2002)
- Long jump (indoor) - 8.22 m (Vienna, 2002)
