= Liu Honglin =

Chinese long jumper

Personal information
- Nationality: Chinese
- Born: 13 October 1976 (age 49)

Sport
- Sport: Athletics
- Event: Long jump

Liu Honglin (born 13 October 1976) is a Chinese athlete. He competed in the men's long jump at the 2000 Summer Olympics.
