= Emmanuel Bangué =

French long jumper

Emmanuel Bangué (born 21 July 1971 in Saint-Maur-des-Fosses) is a French long jumper, best known for finishing fourth at the 1996 Olympic Games. His personal best is 8.25 metres, achieved in September 1996 in Tomblaine.

== Achievements ==
Year	Competition	Venue	Position	Event	Notes
Representing France
1996	European Indoor Championships	Stockholm, Sweden	13th (q)	Long jump	7.82 m
1996	Olympic Games	Atlanta, United States	4th	Long jump	8.19 m
1997	Mediterranean Games	Bari, Italy	9th	Long jump	7.70 m
1997	World Championships	Athens, Greece	8th (sf)	4x100 m relay	38.71 s
1997	World Championships	Athens, Greece	13th (q)	Long jump	7.93 m
1998	European Indoor Championships	Valencia, Spain	3rd	Long jump	8.05 m
1998	European Championships	Budapest, Hungary	9th	Long jump	7.79 m
1999	World Championships	Seville, Spain	9th	Long jump	7.94 m
2000	European Indoor Championships	Ghent, Belgium	6th	Long jump	7.82 m
2002	European Indoor Championships	Vienna, Austria	22nd (q)	Long jump	7.58 m
