= Shirak Poghosyan =

Armenian long jumper

Personal information
- Born: 24 September 1969 (age 57) Yerevan, Armenian SSR, Soviet Union

Sport
- Sport: Track and field

Shirak Poghosyan (Armenian: Շիրակ Պողոսյան, born 24 September 1969) is an Armenian long jumper. He competed at the 2000 Summer Olympics in the men's long jump. Poghosyan's best jump is 8.08 meters, achieved in 2000.
