= Athletics at the 1997 Summer Universiade – Men's long jump =

The men's long jump event at the 1997 Summer Universiade was held at the Stadio Cibali in Catania, Italy, on 30 and 31 August.

== Medalists ==
Gold	Silver	Bronze
Iván Pedroso; Cuba	James Beckford; Jamaica	Gregor Cankar; Slovenia

== Results ==
=== Qualification ===
Rank	Group	Athlete	Nationality	Result	Notes
1	?	Iván Pedroso	Cuba	7.91	
2	?	Brian Bowers	United States	7.88	
3	?	Gregor Cankar	Slovenia	7.87	
4	?	James Beckford	Jamaica	7.86	
4	?	Yevgeniy Tretyak	Russia	7.86	
6	?	Kevin Dilworth	United States	7.84	
7	?	Nélson Carlos Ferreira	Brazil	7.82	
7	?	Bogdan Tudor	Romania	7.82	
9	?	Bogdan Țăruș	Romania	7.79	
10	?	Oleksy Lukashevych	Ukraine	7.69	
11	?	Douglas de Souza	Brazil	7.65	
12	?	Diego Boschiero	Italy	7.64	
13	?	Aleksandr Glavatskiy	Belarus	7.61	
14	?	Sung Hee-jun	South Korea	7.60	
14	?	Xu Bin	China	7.60	
16	?	Roman Shchurenko	Ukraine	7.58	
16	?	Dejan Vojnović	Croatia	7.58	
18	?	János Uzsoki	Hungary	7.56	
19	?	Bakri Darouèche	France	7.53	
20	?	Aleksey Zhukov	Russia	7.51	
21	?	Marko Rajić	Yugoslavia	7.44	
22	?	Takanori Sugibayashi	Japan	7.38	
23	?	Wilfried Dorombo	Central African Republic	7.35	
24	?	Trevino Betty	Canada	7.32	
25	?	Danijel Mišić	Yugoslavia	7.30	
26	?	András Hegedüs	Hungary	7.27	
27	?	Merujan Sarkisyan	Armenia	7.24	
27	?	Niels Kruller	Netherlands	7.24	
29	?	Wisnu Nugroho	Indonesia	7.07	
30	?	Vachik Sahakyan	Armenia	6.99	
31	?	Mohamed Abdelbaki	Jordan	6.81	
32	?	Michael Sharapoff	New Zealand	6.74	
33	?	Ancel Luis Daniel Flores	Honduras	6.73	
34	?	Wong Chi Fai	Macau	6.67	
35	?	Fathi Youssif	Sudan	6.64	
36	?	Maziko Phiri	Zambia	6.58	
37	?	An Dang Hoai	Vietnam	6.57	
38	?	Omar Al-Monani	Jordan	6.08	
?	?	Carlos Castelbranco	Portugal	2.38	
	?	Erik Nys	Belgium	NM	

=== Final ===
Rank	Athlete	Nationality	Result	Notes
1st place, gold medalist(s)	Iván Pedroso	Cuba	8.40	
2nd place, silver medalist(s)	James Beckford	Jamaica	8.35	
3rd place, bronze medalist(s)	Gregor Cankar	Slovenia	8.11	
4	Nélson Carlos Ferreira	Brazil	8.01	
5	Kevin Dilworth	United States	7.92	
6	Brian Bowers	United States	7.85	
7	Olexiy Lukashevych	Ukraine	7.79	
8	Bogdan Țăruș	Romania	7.62	
9	Yevgeniy Tretyak	Russia	7.61	
10	Diego Boschiero	Italy	7.60	
11	Douglas de Souza	Brazil	7.55	
12	Bogdan Tudor	Romania	7.47	
