= Oleksy Lukashevych =

Ukrainian long jumper (born 1977)

Personal information
- Born: 11 January 1977 (age 49) Dnipropetrovsk, Soviet Union

Sport
- Sport: Track and field
Medal record
Representing Ukraine
European Championships
| Gold medal – first place | 2002 Munich | Long jump |
| Bronze medal – third place | 2006 Göteborg | Long jump |
European Indoor Championships
| Gold medal – first place | 1998 Valencia | Long jump |
Summer Universiade
| Gold medal – first place | 1999 Palma de Mallorca | Long jump |
European U23 Championships
| Bronze medal – third place | 1997 Turku | Long jump |
World Junior Championships
| Gold medal – first place | 1996 Sydney | Long jump |

Olexiy Lukashevych (Ukrainian: Олексій Лукашевич; born 11 January 1977) is a Ukrainian long jumper, best known for winning the 2002 European Championships. His personal best is 8.27 metres, achieved in June 2000 in Tartu.

== Achievements ==
| Year | Competition | Venue | Position | Notes |
Representing Ukraine
| 1996 | World Junior Championships | Sydney, Australia | 1st | 7.91 m |
| 1997 | European U23 Championships | Turku, Finland | 3rd | 8.09 m |
| 1997 | World Championships | Athens, Greece | 16th (q) | 7.90 m |
| 1997 | Universiade | Catania, Italy | 7th | 7.79 m |
| 1998 | European Indoor Championships | Valencia, Spain | 1st | 8.06 m |
| 1998 | European Championships | Budapest, Hungary | 18th (q) | 7.72 m |
| 1999 | Universiade | Palma de Mallorca, Spain | 1st | 8.16 m |
| 1999 | World Championships | Seville, Spain | 22nd (q) | 7.77 m |
| 2000 | European Indoor Championships | Ghent, Belgium | 4th | 8.02 m |
| 2000 | Olympic Games | Sydney, Australia | 4th | 8.26 m |
| 2001 | World Championships | Edmonton, Canada | 6th | 8.10 m |
| 2001 | Goodwill Games | Brisbane, Australia | 6th | 7.87 m |
| 2002 | European Indoor Championships | Vienna, Austria | 4th | 8.11 m |
| 2002 | European Championships | Munich, Germany | 1st | 8.08 m |
| 2002 | World Cup | Madrid, Spain | 7th | 7.83 m |
| 2003 | World Championships | Paris, France | 17th (q) | 7.85 m |
| 2005 | European Indoor Championships | Madrid, Spain | 14th (q) | 7.81 m |
| 2006 | European Championships | Göteborg, Sweden | 3rd | 8.12 m |
| 2007 | European Indoor Championships | Birmingham, United Kingdom | 13th (q) | 7.64 m |
| 2007 | World Championships | Osaka, Japan | 4th | 8.25 m |
| 2009 | World Championships | Berlin, Germany | 24th (q) | 7.87 m |
