= 1999 IAAF World Indoor Championships – Men's long jump =

The men's long jump event at the 1999 IAAF World Indoor Championships was held on March 7.

== Results ==
Rank	Athlete	Nationality	#1	#2	#3	#4	#5	#6	Result	Notes
1st place, gold medalist(s)	Iván Pedroso	Cuba	8.46	7.78	x	7.20	x	8.62	8.62	CR
2nd place, silver medalist(s)	Yago Lamela	Spain	8.10	x	8.29	8.42	8.26	8.56	8.56	AR
3rd place, bronze medalist(s)	Erick Walder	United States	8.13	8.14	x	7.94	8.21	8.30	8.30	
4	Gregor Cankar	Slovenia	7.94	8.12	7.90	8.09	8.09	8.28	8.28	NR
5	James Beckford	Jamaica	7.85	7.92	7.90	7.96	8.16	8.05	8.16	
6	Bogdan Țăruș	Romania	7.91	8.02	x	8.07	8.15	7.94	8.15	
7	Masaki Morinaga	Japan	x	x	8.07	6.65	7.56	x	8.07	NR
8	Bogdan Tudor	Romania	7.56	7.74	7.85	7.57	7.84	7.88	7.88	
9	Roland McGhee	United States	7.66	7.84	7.57				7.84	
10	Hatem Mersal	Egypt	7.66	7.49	7.15				7.66	
