= Kirill Sosunov =

Russian athletics and bobsled competitor

Personal information
- Born: 1 November 1975 (age 50) Ryazan, Soviet Union

Sport
- Sport: Track and field
Medal record
Representing Russia
World Championships
Bronze medal – third place	1997 Athens	Long jump
European Championships
Gold medal – first place	1998 Budapest	Long jump
Summer Universiade
Gold medal – first place	1995 Fukuoka	Long jump

Kirill Olegovich Sosunov (Russian: Кири́лл Оле́гович Сосуно́в; born 1 November 1975) is a Russian long jumper and bobsledder. He is the 1998 European champion, and that year he also set his personal best jump with 8.38 metres. The previous year he had won World Championships medals both indoor and outdoor. He switched to bobsled in 2005. Sosunov is married to high jumper Olga Kaliturina.

== Competition record ==
Year	Competition	Venue	Position	Event	Notes
Representing Russia
1994	World Junior Championships	Lisbon, Portugal	28th (q)	Long jump	7.12 m (wind: +1.1 m/s)
1995	World Championships	Gothenburg, Sweden	–	Long jump	NM
1995	Universiade	Fukuoka, Japan	1st	Long jump	8.21 m
1996	European Indoor Championships	Stockholm, Sweden	7th	Long jump	7.87 m
1997	World Indoor Championships	Paris, France	2nd	Long jump	8.41 m
1997	European U23 Championships	Turku, Finland	2nd	Long jump	8.30 m (wind: +1.0 m/s)
1997	World Championships	Athens, Greece	3rd	Long jump	8.18 m
1998	Goodwill Games	Uniondale, United States	7th	Long jump	7.30 m
1998	European Championships	Budapest, Hungary	1st	Long jump	8.28 m
2000	Olympic Games	Sydney, Australia	16th (q)	Long jump	7.97 m
2002	European Indoor Championships	Vienna, Austria	5th	Long jump	8.02 m
2004	World Indoor Championships	Budapest, Hungary	7th	Long jump	8.16 m
2004	Olympic Games	Athens, Greece	16th (q)	Long jump	7.94 m
