= Ian Lowe (long jumper) =

Canadian athlete

Personal information
- Nationality: Canadian
- Born: 23 February 1973 (age 52) Bridgetown, Barbados

Sport
- Sport: Athletics
- Event: Long jump

Ian Lowe (born 23 February 1973) is a Canadian athlete. He competed in the men's long jump at the 2000 Summer Olympics.
