= Mesut Yavaş =

Turkish long jumper

Personal information
- Nationality: Turkish
- Born: 14 April 1978 (age 47)

Sport
- Sport: Athletics
- Event: Long jump

Mesut Yavaş (born 14 April 1978) is a Turkish athlete.

He competed in the men's long jump at the 2000 Summer Olympics.

He achieved the Turkish indoor record in the long jump in March 2000, jumping 8.09 metres in Ames, Iowa. That summer, he jumped 8.08 metres in Istanbul, setting a Turkish outdoor record. In the same year he finished second at the Balkan Championships, and took his sole Turkish championship.

Yavaş won the Balkan Championships in 2001. He was able to compete in the ISTAF meet and also competed at the 2001 World Championships without reaching the final. In 2003 he finished fourth at the Balkan Championships, and competed at the Summer Universiade without reaching the final. He subsequently ceased competing.

Competing in the US college system for Arkansas State University, he graduated with a bachelor's degree in engineering in late 2005.
