= Carlos Calado =

Portuguese long jumper (born 1975)

Carlos Nuno Tavares Calado (born 5 October 1975, in Alcanena, Médio Tejo) is an athlete from Portugal, Sporting CP and S.L. Benfica, who specialises in the long jump.

He was at his peak in 2001 when he won bronze medals at both the World Indoor and Outdoor Championships and set the indoor national record of 8.22 metres. His outdoor personal best of 8.36 metres, set in 1997, is also the national record.

His last major competition was in triple jump at the European Indoor Championships in early 2005, where he was knocked out in the qualifying round.

== Achievements ==
Year	Competition	Venue	Position	Event	Notes
Representing Portugal
1993	European Junior Championships	San Sebastián, Spain	12th	Triple jump	15.30 m
1994	World Junior Championships	Lisbon, Portugal	8th	Long jump	7.56 m w (wind: +3.0 m/s)
1994	World Junior Championships	Lisbon, Portugal	6th	Triple jump	16.14 m w (wind: +3.2 m/s)
1994	Ibero-American Championships	Mar del Plata, Argentina	5th	Long jump	7.14 m w (wind: +2.2 m/s)
1996	European Indoor Championships	Stockholm, Sweden	25th (q)	Long jump	7.26 m
1996	European Indoor Championships	Stockholm, Sweden	14th (q)	Triple jump	15.63 m
1996	Ibero-American Championships	Medellín, Colombia	3rd	Long jump	8.06 m
1996	Ibero-American Championships	Medellín, Colombia	2nd	Triple jump	16.82 m
1996	Olympic Games	Atlanta, United States	24th (q)	Long jump	7.81 m
1996	Olympic Games	Atlanta, United States	19th (q)	Triple jump	16.65 m
1997	World Indoor Championships	Paris, France	11th	Long jump	7.50 m
1997	World Indoor Championships	Paris, France	–	Triple jump	DNF
1997	European U23 Championships	Turku, Finland	2nd	100 m	10.29 s w (wind: +2.8 m/s)
1997	European U23 Championships	Turku, Finland	1st	Long jump	8.32 m w (wind: +2.3 m/s)
1997	World Championships	Seville, Spain	43rd (qf)	100 m	10.41 s
1997	World Championships	Seville, Spain	17th (h)	4 × 100 m relay	39.37 s
1997	World Championships	Seville, Spain	14th (q)	Long jump	7.92 m
1998	European Indoor Championships	Valencia, Spain	2nd	Long jump	8.05 m
1998	Ibero-American Championships	Lisbon, Portugal	4th	Long jump	7.81 m
1999	World Championships	Seville, Spain	25th (qf)	100 m	10.24 s
1999	World Championships	Seville, Spain	25th (q)	Long jump	7.75 m
2000	European Indoor Championships	Ghent, Belgium	11th (q)	Long jump	7.81 m
2000	Olympic Games	Sydney, Australia	10th	Long jump	7.94 m
2001	World Indoor Championships	Lisbon, Portugal	3rd	Long jump	8.16 m (iNR)
2001	World Championships	Edmonton, Canada	3rd	Long jump	8.21 m
2002	European Indoor Championships	Vienna, Austria	17th (q)	Long jump	7.67 m
2004	Ibero-American Championships	Huelva, Spain	4th	Long jump	7.74 m
2005	European Indoor Championships	Madrid, Spain	18th (q)	Triple jump	15.63 m

=== Personal bests ===
- Long jump - 8.36 m (1997)
- Triple jump - 17.08 m (1996)
- 100 metres - 10.11 s (1999)
- 200 metres - 20.90 s (1997)
