= Brenes =

Brenes, Spain
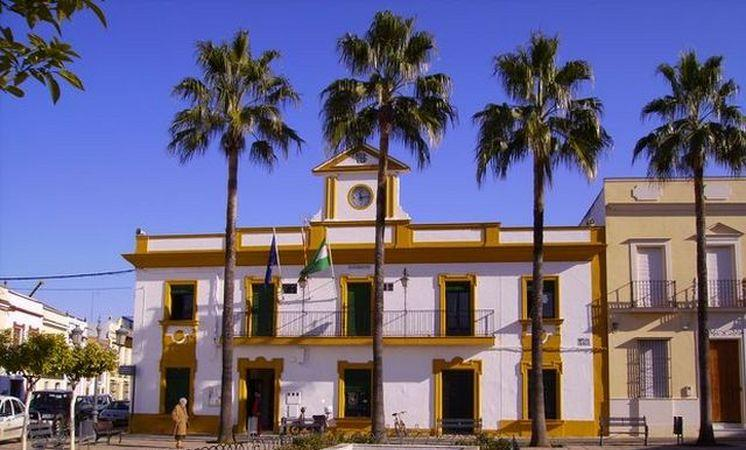

- Flag Coat of arms
- Interactive map of Brenes, Spain
- Coordinates: 37°33′N 5°52′W
- Country: Spain
- Province: Seville
- Municipality: Brenes

Area
  - Total: 22 km^{2} (8.5 sq mi)
- Elevation: 18 m (59 ft)

Population (2025-01-01)
  - Total: 12,975
  - Density: 590/km^{2} (1,500/sq mi)
- Time zone: UTC+1 (CET)
  - Summer (DST): UTC+2 (CEST)
- Website: www.brenes.es

Brenes is a city located in the province of Seville, Spain. According to the 2014 census (INE), the city has a population of 12,737 inhabitants. It covers an area of 22 km^{2} with a density of 598,46 inhabitants/km^{2}. Their geo-coordinates are: 37º 33' N, 5º 52' O and it is 18 m above sea level. The provincial capital, Seville, is 22 km away.

The city is mainly connected by A-462 towards Carmona, and by A-8008 connecting San José de la Rinconada and Seville.

== Geography ==
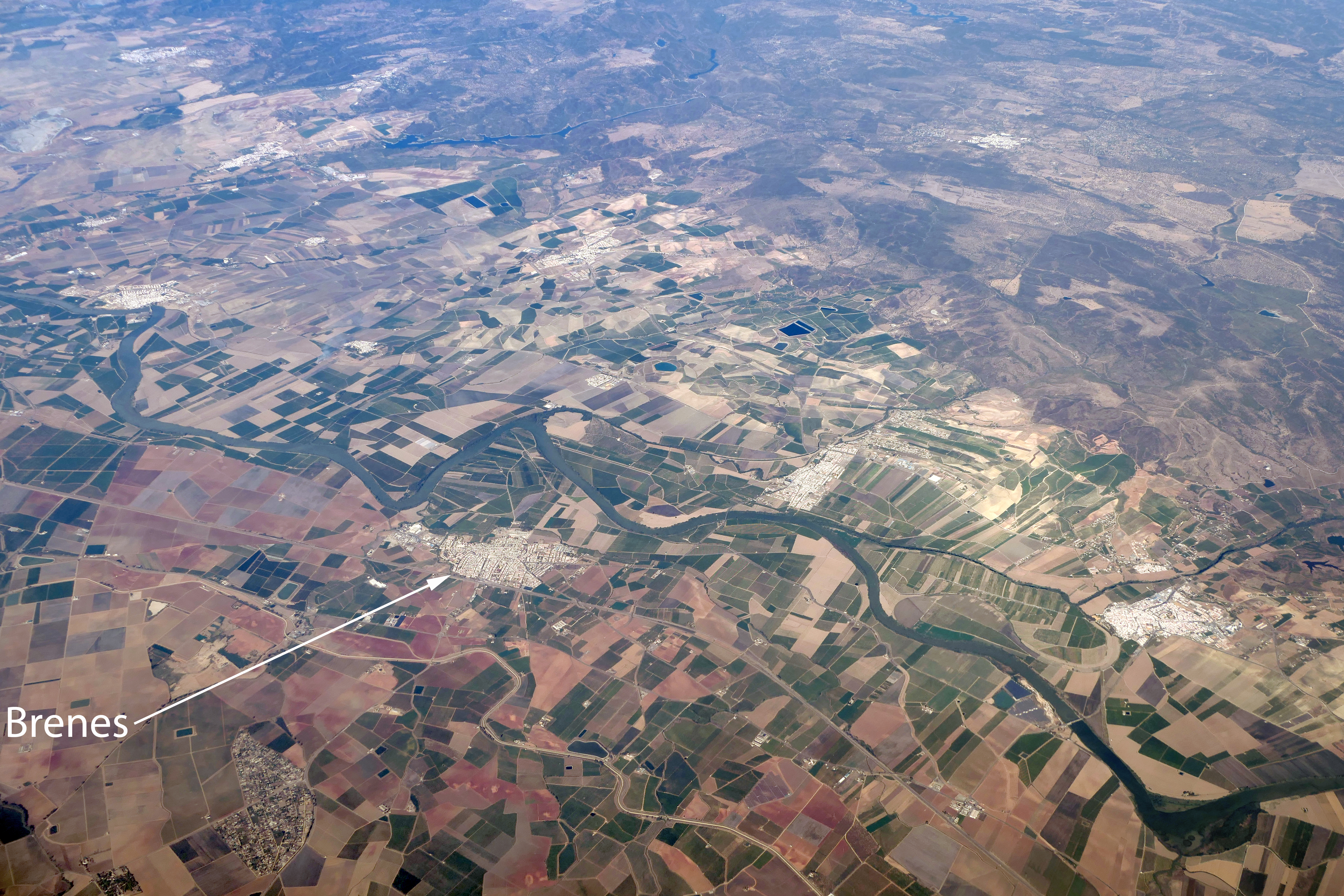
Aerial view of Brenes and the Guadalquivir river.

Brenes is close to the Guadalquivir river.

== See also ==
- List of municipalities in Seville
