= Gregor Cankar =

Slovenian long jumper (born 1975)

Personal information
- Born: 25 January 1975 (age 51) Celje, Yugoslavia

Sport
- Sport: Track and field
Medal record
Representing Slovenia
World Championships
Bronze medal – third place	1999 Seville	Long jump
Summer Universiade
Bronze medal – third place	1995 Fukuoka	Long jump
Bronze medal – third place	1997 Catania	Long jump
Mediterranean Games
Gold medal – first place	1997 Bari	Long jump

Gregor Cankar (born 25 January 1975) is a Slovenian track and field athlete competing in long jump who won the bronze medal at the 1999 World Championships in Athletics. He finished sixth at the 1996 Summer Olympics.

His personal best jump is Slovene record, 8.40 metres, achieved in 1997 in his hometown Celje.

== Achievements ==
Year	Competition	Venue	Position	Notes
Representing Slovenia
1992	World Junior Championships	Seoul, South Korea	20th (q)	7.28 m (wind: +0.2 m/s)
1993	European Junior Championships	San Sebastián, Spain	16th (q)	7.01 m
1994	World Junior Championships	Lisbon, Portugal	1st	8.04 m w (wind: +3.1 m/s)
1994	European Championships	Helsinki, Finland	23rd (q)	7.62 m
1995	World Indoor Championships	Barcelona, Spain	19th (q)	7.65 m
1995	World Championships	Gothenburg, Sweden	–	NM
1995	Universiade	Fukuoka, Japan	3rd	8.18 m (w)
1996	European Indoor Championships	Stockholm, Sweden	4th	8.01 m
1996	Olympic Games	Atlanta, United States	6th	8.11 m
1997	World Indoor Championships	Paris, France	7th	8.02 m
1997	Mediterranean Games	Bari, Italy	1st	8.00 m
1997	World Championships	Athens, Greece	–	NM
1997	Universiade	Catania, Italy	3rd	8.11 m
1998	European Championships	Budapest, Hungary	6th	8.00 m
1999	World Indoor Championships	Maebashi, Japan	4th	8.28 m
1999	World Championships	Sevilla, Spain	3rd	8.36 m
2000	European Indoor Championships	Ghent, Belgium	5th	7.94 m
2000	Olympic Games	Sydney, Australia	15th (q)	7.98 m
2001	World Championships	Edmonton, Canada	–	NM
2001	Mediterranean Games	Radès, Tunisia	–	NM
2002	European Indoor Championships	Vienna, Austria	9th (q)	7.88 m
2002	European Championships	Munich, Germany	15th (q)	7.64 m
2004	Olympic Games	Athens, Greece	39th (q)	7.32 m
