= Yago Lamela =

Spanish long jumper (1977–2014)

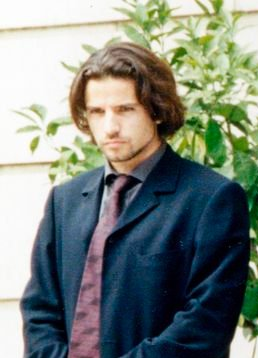

Medal record

Men's Athletics

Representing Spain

World Championships
| Silver medal – second place | 1999 Seville | Long jump |
| Bronze medal – third place | 2003 Paris | Long jump |

World Indoor Championships
| Silver medal – second place | 1999 Maebashi | Long jump |
| Silver medal – second place | 2003 Birmingham | Long jump |

European Championships
| Bronze medal – third place | 2002 Munich | Long jump |

European Indoor Championships
| Silver medal – second place | 2002 Vienna | Long jump |

Santiago "Yago" Lamela Tobío (July 24, 1977 – May 8, 2014) was a Spanish athlete competing in the long jump.

Lamela competed for the Iowa State Cyclones track and field team in the NCAA.

His greatest year was 1999, when he jumped 8.56 during the indoor season to win the silver medal at the 1999 World Indoor Championships. Later that year he set a new outdoors personal best with 8.56, and won another silver medal at the World Championships. His 8.56 m jump stayed as European indoor long jump record for ten years.

He was the number one ranked long jumper in the world in the year 2003, with a best jump of 8.53 m. His career was marked by multiple injuries, including two Achiles tears in 2004 and 2006. He retired in 2009.

In June, 2011, the ex-athlete was admitted to the psychiatric ward of the San Agustin de Avilés hospital. He suffered from chronic depression.

On May 8, 2014, Lamela was found dead at his parents' house. The coroner announced a heart attack as the cause of death. Lamela was 36.

== Personal bests ==
- Long jump - 8.56 (1999)
- Triple jump - 16.72 (1998)

== Competition record ==
| Year | Competition | Venue | Position | Event | Notes |
Representing Spain
| 1994 | World Junior Championships | Lisbon, Portugal | 14th (q) | Triple jump | 15.47 m (wind: +0.1 m/s) |
| 1995 | European Junior Championships | Nyíregyháza, Hungary | 12th | Triple jump | 14.79 m |
| 1996 | World Junior Championships | Sydney, Australia | 4th | Long jump | 7.73 m (wind: +0.4 m/s) |
| 1998 | European Indoor Championships | Valencia, Spain | 5th | Long jump | 7.95 m |
| 1998 | Ibero-American Championships | Lisbon, Portugal | 1st | Long jump | 8.12 m |
| 1998 | European Championships | Budapest, Hungary | 8th | Long jump | 7.93 m |
| 1999 | World Indoor Championships | Maebashi, Japan | 2nd | Long jump | 8.56 m (iAR) |
| 1999 | European U23 Championships | Gothenburg, Sweden | 1st | Long jump | 8.36 m (wind: +0.7 m/s) |
| 1999 | World Championships | Seville, Spain | 2nd | Long jump | 8.40 m |
| 2000 | Olympic Games | Sydney, Australia | 19th (q) | Long jump | 7.89 m |
| 2002 | European Indoor Championships | Vienna, Austria | 2nd | Long jump | 8.17 m |
| 2002 | European Championships | Munich, Germany | 3rd | Long jump | 7.99 m |
| 2003 | World Indoor Championships | Birmingham, United Kingdom | 2nd | Long jump | 8.28 m |
| 2003 | World Championships | Paris, France | 3rd | Long jump | 8.22 m |
| 2004 | World Indoor Championships | Budapest, Hungary | 9th (q) | Long jump | 7.95 m |
| 2004 | Olympic Games | Athens, Greece | 11th | Long jump | 7.98 m |

Sporting positions
| Preceded by Savanté Stringfellow | Men's Long Jump Best Year Performance; 2003 | Succeeded by Dwight Phillips |
