= Siniša Ergotić =

Croatian long jumper

Personal information
- Born: 14 September 1968 (age 57) Osijek, SR Croatia, SFR Yugoslavia
- Height: 178 cm (5 ft 10 in)
- Weight: 70 kg (154 lb)
Medal record
Men's Athletics
Representing Croatia
European Athletics Championships
Silver medal – second place	2002 Munich	Long Jump
Mediterranean Games
Gold medal – first place	2001 Radès	Long Jump

Siniša Ergotić (born 14 September 1968) is a Croatian long jumper.

He won the gold medal the 2001 Mediterranean Games in Tunis and the silver medal at the 2002 European Championships in Athletics in Munich. He has competed at three consecutive Summer Olympics, starting in 1996, without reaching the finals.

His personal best jump is 8.23 metres, achieved in June 2002 in Zagreb.

As of 2011, Ergotić is the director of the Croatia national athletics team and is also the president of the Croatian Athletics Federation.

== Competition record ==
Year	Competition	Venue	Position	Event	Notes
Representing Yugoslavia
1987	European Junior Championships	Birmingham, United Kingdom	13th	Long jump	7.31 m
1989	Universiade	Duisburg, West Germany	17th (q)	Long jump	7.48 m
1990	European Championships	Split, Yugoslavia	9th	Long jump	7.83 m (0.0 m/s)
1991	Universiade	Sheffield, United Kingdom	15th (q)	Long jump	7.58 m
Representing Croatia
1992	European Indoor Championships	Genoa, Italy	19th	Long jump	7.52 m
1993	Universiade	Buffalo, United States	19th (q)	Long jump	7.49 m
1994	European Championships	Helsinki, Finland	40th (h)	100 m	10.80 (+0.3 m/s)
1994	European Championships	Helsinki, Finland	26th (q)	Long jump	7.55 m (+0.1 m/s)
1995	World Championships	Gothenburg, Sweden	19th (q)	Long jump	7.85 m
1995	Universiade	Fukuoka, Japan	15th	Long jump	7.61 m
1996	Olympic Games	Atlanta, United States	–	Long jump	NM
1997	Mediterranean Games	Bari, Italy	6th	Long jump	7.74 m
1998	European Championships	Budapest, Hungary	29th (q)	Long jump	7.57 m
2000	Olympic Games	Sydney, Australia	29th (h)	4 × 100 m relay	39.87 s
2000	Olympic Games	Sydney, Australia	36th (q)	Long jump	7.53 m
2001	Mediterranean Games	Radès, Tunisia	1st	Long jump	8.08 m
2002	European Indoor Championships	Vienna, Austria	21st (q)	Long jump	7.59 m
2002	European Championships	Munich, Germany	2nd	Long jump	8.00 m
2003	World Indoor Championships	Birmingham, United Kingdom	8th (q)	Long jump	7.83 m
2003	World Championships	Paris, France	14th (q)	Long jump	7.87 m
2004	World Indoor Championships	Budapest, Hungary	24th (q)	Long jump	7.45 m
2004	Olympic Games	Athens, Greece	26th (q)	Long jump	7.77 m
