= Roman Shchurenko =

Ukrainian long jumper

Personal information
- Born: 14 September 1976 (age 50) Nikopol, Soviet Union

Sport
- Sport: Track and field
Medal record
Representing Ukraine
Olympic Games
Bronze medal – third place	2000 Sydney	Long jump
European Junior Championships
Gold medal – first place	1995 Nyíregyháza	Long jump
European Youth Olympic Festival
Silver medal – second place	1993 Valkenswaard	Long jump

Roman Anatoliyovych Shchurenko (Ukrainian: Роман Анатолійович Щуренко; born 14 September 1976) is a male athlete from Ukraine specializing in long jump. His personal best jump, which he achieved in July 2000, is 8.35 metres. The same year he won a surprising bronze medal at the Olympic Games with a 8.31 metre jump. He was born in Nikopol, Soviet Ukraine.

== Competition record ==
Year	Competition	Venue	Position	Notes
Representing Ukraine
1995	European Junior Championships	Nyíregyháza, Hungary	1st	7.78 m
1997	European U23 Championships	Turku, Finland	5th	7.94 m (+0.9 m/s)
1997	Universiade	Catania, Italy	16th (q)	7.58 m
1998	European Championships	Budapest, Hungary	15th (q)	7.75 m
1999	Universiade	Palma de Mallorca, Spain	4th	7.96 m
1999	World Championships	Seville, Spain	15th (q)	7.89 m
2000	European Indoor Championships	Ghent, Belgium	12th (q)	7.73 m
2000	Olympic Games	Sydney, Australia	3rd	8.31 m
2001	World Championships	Edmonton, Canada	15th (q)	7.74 m
2001	Goodwill Games	Brisbane, Australia	7th	7.76 m
2002	European Indoor Championships	Vienna, Austria	20th (q)	7.60 m
2002	European Championships	Munich, Germany	4th	7.96 m
