= Melvin Lister =

American long jumper and triple jumper

Personal information
- Born: August 29, 1977 (age 49) New York City, United States

Sport
- Sport: Track and field

Melvin "Mel" Lister (born August 29, 1977, in New York City, New York) is an American long jumper and triple jumper.

He finished fifth in long jump at the 2001 World Indoor Championships. He also competed at the 2000 and 2004 Olympic Games without reaching the final.

His personal best long jump is 8.49 metres, achieved in May 2000 in Baton Rouge. His personal best triple jump is 17.78 metres, achieved in July 2004 in Sacramento. He also had 20.51 seconds in the 200 metres.

Lister competed collegiately at track and field powerhouse University of Arkansas.
