= Tomas Bardauskas =

Lithuanian long jumper (born 1975)

Personal information
- Nationality: Lithuanian
- Born: 22 March 1975 (age 51)

Sport
- Sport: Athletics
- Event: Long jump

Tomas Bardauskas (born 22 March 1975) is a Lithuanian athlete. He competed in the men's long jump at the 2000 Summer Olympics.
