= Ronald Servius =

French long jumper

Ronald Servius (born February 21, 1976, in Thionville, France) is a French athlete who specializes in the long jump. Servius competed at the 2000 Summer Olympics.
