= Krzysztof Łuczak =

Polish long jumper

Personal information
- Nationality: Polish
- Born: January 13, 1975 (age 51) Poland

Sport
- Sport: Athletics
- Event: Long jump

Achievements and titles
- Personal best: 8.16 m (1997)

Krzysztof Łuczak (born 13 January 1975) is a retired Polish long jumper.

He competed at the 1997 World Indoor Championships without reaching the final, and competed at the 1997 World Championships without recording a valid mark. He became Polish champion in 1996 and 1997, and Polish indoor champion in 1995, 1997 and 1998.

His personal best jump was 8.16 metres, achieved in June 1997 in Bydgoszcz.
