= Mattias Sunneborn =

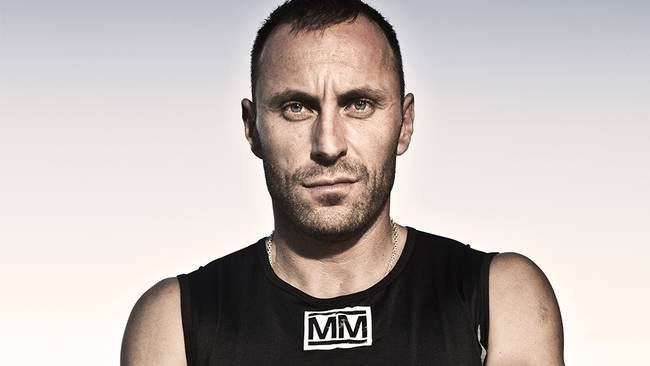
- Mattias Sunneborn in 2014

Personal information
- Nationality: Swedish
- Born: September 27, 1970 (age 55) Bunge, Gotland, Sweden
- Height: 1.87 m (6 ft 2 in)
- Weight: 85 kg (187 lb)

Sport
- Sport: Athletics
- Events: Long jump, sprint

Achievements and titles
- Personal best: Long jump: 8.21 m

Mattias Sunneborn (born 27 September 1970 in Bunge, Gotland) is a Swedish track and field athlete who has competed internationally in the long jump and sprint events. He has represented Sweden at Olympic level and has also competed in masters athletics at international level.

He won the silver medal in the long jump at the 1995 IAAF World Indoor Championships in Barcelona, and finished eighth in the long jump at the 1996 Summer Olympics in Atlanta, and competing at the 2000 Summer Olympics in Sydney.

Sunneborn has continued to compete in masters athletics at international level across multiple age categories.

Beyond his athletic career, Sunneborn has been active in public health initiatives in Sweden and serves as an ambassador for Suicide Zero, an organisation focused on suicide prevention and mental health awareness.

== Early life and background ==
Sunneborn was born in Bunge, Gotland. His father was a school principal. At the age of 15, his father died by suicide, an event that had a lasting impact on his personal development.

He has stated in interviews that he did not speak publicly about the circumstances of his father’s death for many years, and that sport became an important stabilising factor during his adolescence.

In later years, he has spoken publicly about this experience in interviews and public lectures, and has taken part in suicide prevention initiatives in Sweden, including serving as an ambassador for Suicide Zero.

== Athletic career ==
Sunneborn became the first Swedish athlete to surpass the 8-metre mark in the long jump, establishing himself as one of the country’s leading athletes in the discipline.

At the 1995 IAAF World Indoor Championships in Barcelona, he won the silver medal in the long jump with 8.20 metres.

He finished eighth in the long jump at the 1996 Summer Olympics in Atlanta and competed at the 2000 Summer Olympics in Sydney.

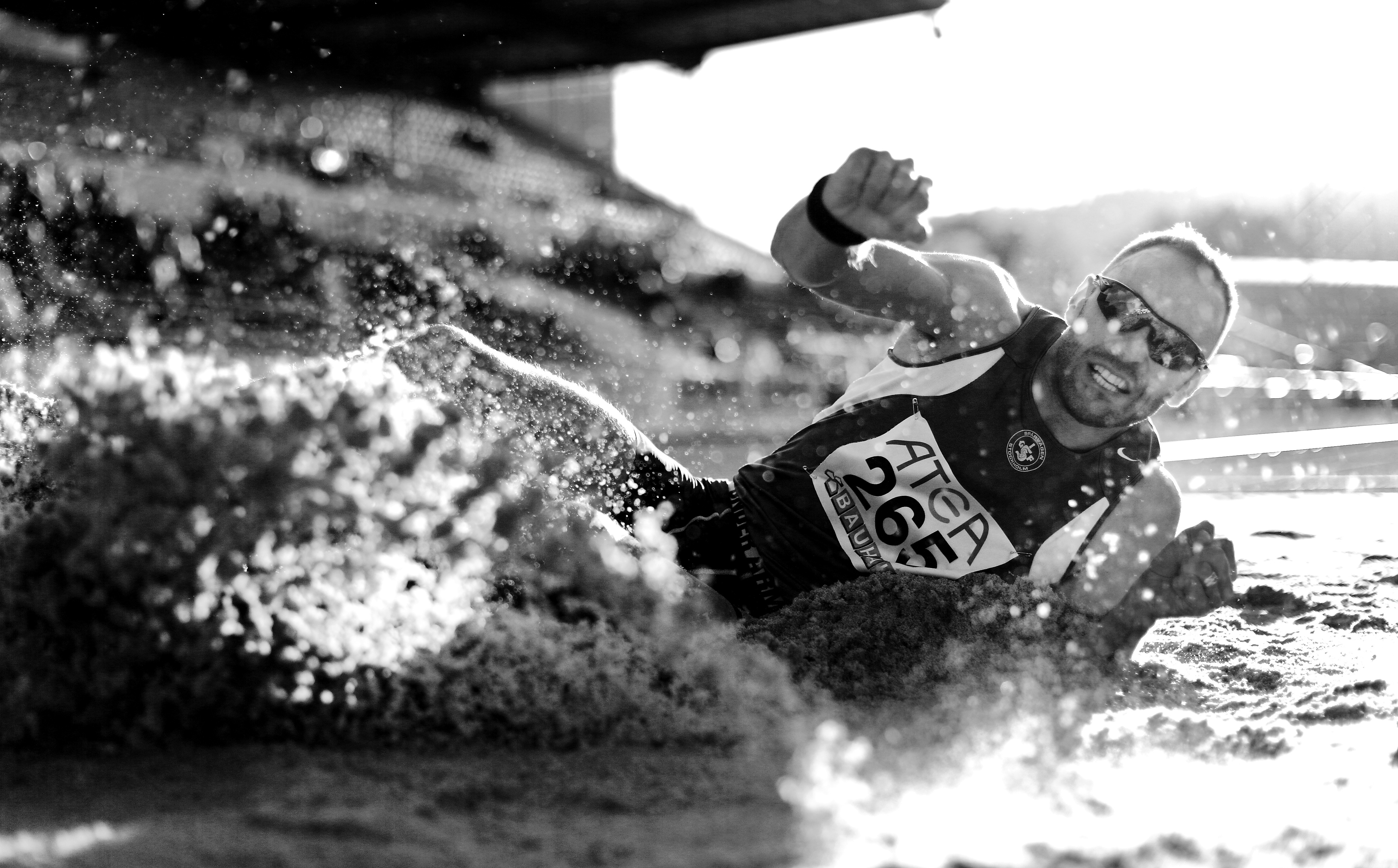
Sunneborn during a long jump attempt

=== International competitions ===
| Year | Competition | Venue | Event | Result | Position | Notes |
|---|---|---|---|---|---|---|
| 1995 | IAAF World Indoor Championships | Barcelona | Long jump | 8.20 m | 2nd | Silver medal |
| 1996 | Summer Olympics | Atlanta | Long jump | 8.06 m | 8th | Finalist |
| 2000 | Summer Olympics | Sydney | Long jump | — | Qualification | Did not advance |

== Psychological approach ==
Sunneborn was known in Swedish sports media for his strong focus on goal-setting and competitive psychology. He used explicit performance targets as motivational tools and was described as an athlete with a high-pressure competitive mindset.

== Masters athletics ==
Following his elite-level athletics career, Sunneborn continued competing in masters athletics at international level.

He recorded a 7.59-metre long jump in the M40 category, recognised as a European masters best performance.

At the 2016 World Masters Athletics Championships in Perth, he won the gold medal in the M45 long jump with 6.48 metres.

At the 2024 World Masters Athletics Championships in Gothenburg, he won the silver medal in the M50 category with 6.00 metres.<

=== Masters results ===
| Year | Competition | Venue | Category | Event | Result | Position | Notes |
|---|---|---|---|---|---|---|---|
| — | European masters performance | — | M40 | Long jump | 7.59 m | — | Best performance |
| 2016 | World Masters Athletics Championships | Perth | M45 | Long jump | 6.48 m | 1st | Gold medal |
| 2024 | World Masters Athletics Championships | Gothenburg | M50 | Long jump | 6.00 m | 2nd | Silver medal |

== Public activity ==
Sunneborn is involved in public health and youth mental health initiatives in Sweden. Since 2014, he has served as an ambassador for Suicide Zero.

His involvement is closely linked to personal experience, as his father died by suicide when Sunneborn was 15 years old.

He has spoken publicly about this experience in interviews and lectures, describing its long-term impact on his life and outlook.

He has participated in school programmes, sports clubs, and awareness campaigns aimed at reducing stigma around mental health issues.
