= Peter Häggström =

Swedish athlete (born 1976)

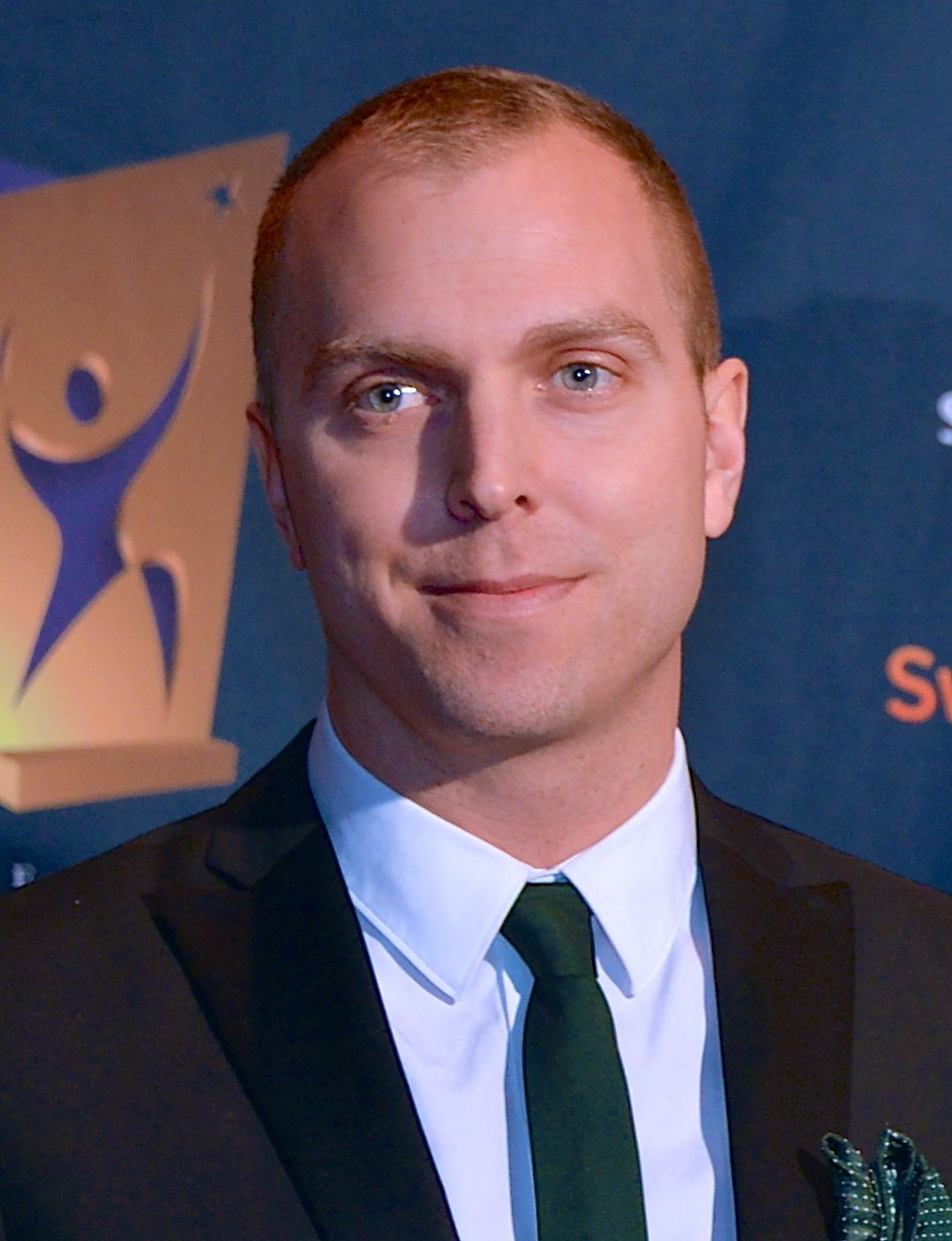

Personal information
- Full name: Erik Peter Häggström
- Nationality: Swedish
- Born: January 27, 1976 (age 50) Malmö, Sweden

Sport
- Country: Sweden
- Sport: Long jump
- Club: IK Ymer, Borås

Erik Peter Häggström (born January 27, 1976) is a Swedish athlete who competed in the long jump. He represented Sweden at the 2000 Summer Olympics, where he placed 11th in his heat and 24th overall in the qualifying round. Following his retirement from competition, he began working for Swedish Television.

He came out as gay in November, 2009.

== See also ==
- Homosexuality in sports
- Principle 6 campaign
