= 2001 IAAF Golden League =

Athletics competition series

The 2001 IAAF Golden League was the fourth edition of the annual international track and field meeting series, held from 29 June to 31 August. It was contested at seven European meetings: the Golden Gala, Meeting Gaz de France, Bislett Games, Herculis, Weltklasse Zürich, Memorial Van Damme and the Internationales Stadionfest (ISTAF).

The Golden League jackpot consisted of one million US dollars' worth of gold bars. The jackpot was available to athletes who won at least five of the seven competitions of the series in one of the fourteen specified events (8 for men, 6 for women). The jackpot events for 2001 were:

- Men: 100 m, 800 m, 1500 m, 3000 m, 3000 m steeplechase, 110 m hurdles, long jump, javelin throw
- Women: 100 m, 800 m, 1500 m, 3000 m, 400 m hurdles, high jump

The jackpot winners were Hicham El Guerrouj of Morocco, Switzerland's André Bucher, Americans Allen Johnson and Marion Jones, Romania's Violeta Szekely and Olga Yegorova of Russia. Szekely won all seven of the 1,500-metre races, while the other athletes won the minimum of five. Marion Jones's results were later annulled after she admitted to doping.

== Results ==
Event	Golden Gala 29 June	Meeting Gaz de France 6 July	Bislett Games 13 July	Herculis 20 July	Weltklasse Zürich 17 August	Memorial Van Damme 24 August	ISTAF 31 August
Men
100 m	Maurice Greene (USA)	Maurice Greene (USA)	Tim Montgomery (USA)	Bernard Williams (USA)	Tim Montgomery (USA)	Tim Montgomery (USA)	Francis Obikwelu (NGR)
200 m	—	—	—	—	Bernard Williams (USA)	J. J. Johnson (USA)	—
800 m	André Bucher (SUI)	André Bucher (SUI)	Wilfred Bungei (KEN)	André Bucher (SUI)	André Bucher (SUI)	Yuriy Borzakovskiy (RUS)	André Bucher (SUI)
1500 m Mile run 2000 m	Hicham El Guerrouj (MAR)	Hicham El Guerrouj (MAR)	Ali Saïdi-Sief (ALG)	Rui Silva (POR)	Hicham El Guerrouj (MAR)	Hicham El Guerrouj (MAR)	Hicham El Guerrouj (MAR)
3000 m 5000 m	Hailu Mekonnen (ETH)	Luke Kipkosgei (KEN)	Paul Bitok (KEN)	Paul Bitok (KEN)	Richard Limo (KEN)	Hailu Mekonnen (ETH)	Paul Bitok (KEN)
10,000 m	—	—	—	—	—	Mark Bett (KEN)	—
3000 m s'chase	Reuben Kosgei (KEN)	Wilson Boit Kipketer (KEN)	Wilson Boit Kipketer (KEN)	Wilson Boit Kipketer (KEN)	Brahim Boulami (MAR)	Brahim Boulami (MAR)	Stephen Cherono (KEN)
110 m hurdles	Colin Jackson (GBR)	Allen Johnson (USA)	Allen Johnson (USA)	Allen Johnson (USA)	Allen Johnson (USA)	Anier García (CUB)	Allen Johnson (USA)
400 m hurdles	James Carter (USA)	Angelo Taylor (USA)	—	Felix Sánchez (DOM)	Felix Sánchez (DOM)	—	—
Pole vault	—	Viktor Chistyakov (AUS)	—	Dmitriy Markov (AUS)	Jeff Hartwig (USA)	Jeff Hartwig (USA)	—
Long jump	Kevin Dilworth (USA)	Ivan Pedroso (CUB)	Kevin Dilworth (USA)	Danila Burkenya (RUS)	Kevin Dilworth (USA)	Savante Stringfellow (USA)	Ivan Pedroso (CUB)
Shot put	—	—	Bradley Snyder (CAN)	—	—	—	—
Discus throw	—	—	—	—	Virgilijus Alekna (LTU)	—	Lars Riedel (GER)
Javelin throw	Konstadinós Gatsioúdis (GRE)	Konstadinós Gatsioúdis (GRE)	Peter Blank (GER)	Pål Arne Fagernes (NOR)	Raymond Hecht (GER)	Jan Železný (CZE)	Jan Železný (CZE)
Hammer throw	Koji Murofushi (JPN)	—	—	—	—	—	—
Women
100 m	Marion Jones (USA)	Marion Jones (USA)	Marion Jones (USA)	Chryste Gaines (USA)	Marion Jones (USA)	Marion Jones (USA)	Myriam Léonie Mani (CMR)
200 m	—	—	—	—	—	Beverly McDonald (JAM)	—
400 m	—	—	—	Ana Guevara (MEX)	—	—	Grit Breuer (GER)
800 m	Stephanie Graf (AUT)	Stephanie Graf (AUT)	Stephanie Graf (AUT)	Maria Mutola (MOZ)	Maria Mutola (MOZ)	Stephanie Graf (AUT)	Maria Mutola (MOZ)
1500 m	Violeta Szekely (ROM)	Violeta Szekely (ROM)	Violeta Szekely (ROM)	Violeta Szekely (ROM)	Violeta Szekely (ROM)	Violeta Szekely (ROM)	Violeta Szekely (ROM)
3000 m 5000 m	Olga Yegorova (RUS)	Olga Yegorova (RUS)	Edith Masai (KEN)	Edith Masai (KEN)	Olga Yegorova (RUS)	Olga Yegorova (RUS)	Olga Yegorova (RUS)
100 m hurdles	—	Jenny Adams (USA)	—	Olga Shishigina (KAZ)	Gail Devers (USA)	—	—
400 m hurdles	Nezha Bidouane (MAR)	Tetiana Tereshchuk-Antipova (UKR)	Tetiana Tereshchuk-Antipova (UKR)	Daimí Pernía (CUB)	Nezha Bidouane (MAR)	Nezha Bidouane (MAR)	Yuliya Nosova (RUS)
Pole vault	—	—	—	—	—	—	Svetlana Feofanova (RUS)
High jump	Kajsa Bergqvist (SWE)	Venelina Veneva (BUL)	Inha Babakova (UKR)	Kajsa Bergqvist (SWE)	Hestrie Cloete (RSA)	Vita Palamar (UKR)	Kajsa Bergqvist (SWE)
Long jump	Tatyana Kotova (RUS)	—	—	—	Eunice Barber (FRA)	—	—
Hammer throw	—	Dawn Ellerbe (USA)	—	—	—	—	—
