= 1999 IAAF World Indoor Championships – Men's 4 × 400 metres relay =

The men's 4 × 400 metres relay event at the 1999 IAAF World Indoor Championships was held on March 6–7.

== Medalists ==
| Gold | Silver | Bronze |
|---|---|---|
| United States; Andre Morris; Dameon Johnson; Deon Minor; Milton Campbell; Khadevis Robinson* | Poland; Piotr Haczek; Jacek Bocian; Piotr Rysiukiewicz; Robert Maćkowiak | Great Britain; Allyn Condon; Solomon Wariso; Adrian Patrick; Jamie Baulch; Sean Baldock* |

* Runners who participated in the heats only and received medals.

== Results ==
=== Heats ===
Qualification: First 2 teams of each heat (Q) and the next 2 fastest (q) advance to the final.

| Rank | Heat | Nation | Athletes | Time | Notes |
|---|---|---|---|---|---|
| 1 | 1 | Poland | Piotr Rysiukiewicz, Piotr Haczek, Jacek Bocian, Robert Maćkowiak | 3:04.25 | Q, NR |
| 2 | 1 | Japan | Kazuhiro Takahashi, Jun Osakada, Masayoshi Kan, Shunji Karube | 3:05.90 | Q, AR |
| 3 | 1 | Great Britain | Allyn Condon, Sean Baldock, Adrian Patrick, Solomon Wariso | 3:06.34 | q, NR |
| 4 | 2 | United States | Andre Morris, Dameon Johnson, Deon Minor, Khadevis Robinson | 3:08.41 | Q |
| 5 | 2 | Jamaica | Michael McDonald, Linval Laird, Sanjay Ayre, Danny McFarlane | 3:08.90 | Q |
| 6 | 2 | France | Marc Foucan, Emmanuel Front, Christophe Cheval, Bruno Wavelet | 3:09.27 | q |
| 7 | 2 | Austria | Martin Lachkovics, Andreas Rechbauer, Hans-Peter Welz, Christoph Pöstinger | 3:09.30 | |
| 8 | 1 | Spain | Andrés Martinez, Antonio Andres, Juan Vicente Trull, David Canal | 3:15.94 | |

=== Final ===
| Rank | Nation | Competitors | Time | Notes |
|---|---|---|---|---|
| 1st place, gold medalist(s) | United States | Andre Morris, Dameon Johnson, Deon Minor, Milton Campbell | 3:02.83 | WR |
| 2nd place, silver medalist(s) | Poland | Piotr Haczek, Jacek Bocian, Piotr Rysiukiewicz, Robert Maćkowiak | 3:03.01 | AR |
| 3rd place, bronze medalist(s) | Great Britain | Allyn Condon, Solomon Wariso, Adrian Patrick, Jamie Baulch | 3:03.20 | NR |
| 4 | Jamaica | Michael McDonald, Danny McFarlane, Linval Laird, Roxbert Martin | 3:05.13 | NR |
| 5 | Japan | Kazuhiro Takahashi, Jun Osakada, Masayoshi Kan, Shunji Karube | 3:06.22 | |
| 6 | France | Marc Foucan, Emmanuel Front, Bruno Wavelet, Fred Mango | 3:06.37 | NR |
