= 1997 IAAF World Indoor Championships – Men's 4 × 400 metres relay =

The men's 4 × 400 metres relay event at the 1997 IAAF World Indoor Championships was held on March 8–9.

== Medalists ==
Gold	Silver	Bronze
United States; Jason Rouser; Mark Everett; Sean Maye; Deon Minor	Jamaica; Linval Laird; Michael McDonald; Dinsdale Morgan; Greg Haughton; Garth Robinson*	France; Pierre-Marie Hilaire; Rodrigue Nordin; Loic Lerouge; Fred Mango

* Runners who participated in the heats only and received medals.

== Results ==
=== Heats ===
First 2 teams of each heat (Q) and the next 2 fastest (q) qualified for the final.

Rank	Heat	Nation	Athletes	Time	Notes
1	2	Jamaica	Garth Robinson, Michael McDonald, Dinsdale Morgan, Greg Haughton	3:06.87	Q, WL
2	1	United States	Jason Rouser, Sean Maye, Mark Everett, Deon Minor	3:08.03	Q
3	1	Austria	Martin Lachkovics, Rafik Elouardi, Andreas Rechbauer, Thomas Griesser	3:08.37	Q
4	1	Japan	Shunji Karube, Dai Tamesue, Masayoshi Kan, Shigekazu Ōmori	3:08.58	q
5	1	Russia	Dmitriy Bey, Dmitriy Kosov, Dmitriy Guzov, Dmitriy Golovastov	3:08.85	q
6	2	France	Pierre-Marie Hilaire, Rodrigue Nordin, Loic Lerouge, Fred Mango	3:09.50	Q
7	2	Italy	Andrea Nuti, Alessandro Aimar, Ashraf Saber, Marco Vaccari	3:09.98	
8	1	Brazil	Claudinei da Silva, Osmar dos Santos, Flávio Godoy, Geraldo Maranhão Jr.	3:10.50	
9	2	Mexico	Alejandro Cárdenas, Juan Vallín, Alberto Araujo, Juan Pedro Toledo	3:11.41	
10	2	Great Britain	Guy Bullock, Richard Knowles, Sean Baldock, Adrian Patrick	3:14.55	

=== Final ===
Rank	Nation	Athletes	Time	Notes
1st place, gold medalist(s)	United States	Jason Rouser, Mark Everett, Sean Maye, Deon Minor	3:04.93	WL
2nd place, silver medalist(s)	Jamaica	Linval Laird, Michael McDonald, Dinsdale Morgan, Greg Haughton	3:08.11	
3rd place, bronze medalist(s)	France	Pierre-Marie Hilaire, Rodrigue Nordin, Loic Lerouge, Fred Mango	3:09.68	
4	Russia	Dmitriy Bey, Ruslan Mashchenko, Dmitriy Kosov, Dmitriy Golovastov	3:09.75	
5	Austria	Martin Lachkovics, Rafik Elouardi, Andreas Rechbauer, Thomas Griesser	3:11.47	
6	Japan	Shunji Karube, Dai Tamesue, Shigekazu Ōmori, Masayoshi Kan	3:20.18	
