= 1997 IAAF World Indoor Championships – Men's long jump =

The men's long jump event at the 1997 IAAF World Indoor Championships was held on March 7–8.

== Medalists ==
| Gold | Silver | Bronze |
|---|---|---|
| Iván Pedroso; Cuba | Kirill Sosunov; Russia | Joe Greene; United States |

== Results ==
=== Qualification ===
Qualification: 7.95 (Q) or at least 12 best performers (q) qualified for the final.

| Rank | Group | Athlete | Nationality | #1 | #2 | #3 | Result | Notes |
|---|---|---|---|---|---|---|---|---|
| 1 | A | Kirill Sosunov | Russia | 7.38 | 7.78 | 8.30 | 8.30 | Q, PB |
| 2 | B | Joe Greene | United States | x | 7.78 | 8.17 | 8.17 | Q, SB |
| 3 | B | Yevgeniy Tretyak | Russia | 7.57 | 7.80 | 8.13 | 8.13 | Q |
| 4 | B | Iván Pedroso | Cuba | 8.12 | | | 8.12 | Q |
| 5 | B | Gregor Cankar | Slovenia | x | x | 8.04 | 8.04 | Q |
| 6 | A | Romuald Ducros | France | x | 7.98 | x | 7.98 | Q, PB |
| 7 | B | Bogdan Tudor | Romania | 7.71 | 7.87 | 7.95 | 7.95 | Q |
| 8 | B | Aleksandr Glavatskiy | Belarus | 7.85 | 7.95 | | 7.95 | Q |
| 9 | B | James Beckford | Jamaica | 7.95 | | | 7.95 | Q |
| 10 | B | Spyros Vasdekis | Greece | 7.75 | 7.68 | 7.92 | 7.92 | q |
| 11 | A | Erick Walder | United States | 7.88 | 7.92 | x | 7.92 | q |
| 12 | B | Carlos Calado | Portugal | 7.47 | 7.80 | 7.85 | 7.85 | q, NR |
| 13 | A | Cheikh Touré | Senegal | 7.54 | 7.73 | 7.84 | 7.84 | |
| 14 | A | Nobuharu Asahara | Japan | 7.41 | 7.83 | 7.80 | 7.83 | |
| 15 | A | Mattias Sunneborn | Sweden | 7.62 | 7.81 | 7.81 | 7.81 | |
| 16 | A | Bogdan Țăruș | Romania | 7.63 | 7.75 | 7.70 | 7.75 | |
| 17 | A | Dimitrios Chatzopoulos | Greece | 7.71 | x | 7.71 | 7.71 | |
| 18 | A | Yevgeniy Semenyuk | Ukraine | 7.41 | 7.69 | 7.54 | 7.69 | |
| 19 | A | Krzysztof Łuczak | Poland | 7.60 | x | 7.64 | 7.64 | |
| 20 | B | Huang Geng | China | 7.35 | 7.59 | x | 7.59 | |
| 21 | A | Nélson Carlos Ferreira | Brazil | 7.48 | x | 7.58 | 7.58 | |
| 22 | A | Yang Chao | China | 7.57 | 7.57 | x | 7.57 | |
| 23 | A | Konstantin Krause | Germany | 7.27 | 7.56 | x | 7.56 | |
| 24 | B | Younès Moudrik | Morocco | 5.21 | 7.49 | x | 7.49 | NR |
| 25 | A | Franck Zio | Burkina Faso | x | 7.49 | x | 7.49 | |
| 25 | B | Olivier Borderan | France | x | x | 7.49 | 7.49 | |
| 27 | B | Robert Emmiyan | Armenia | 7.42 | x | 7.44 | 7.44 | |
| 28 | A | Pedro García | Cuba | 7.34 | x | x | 7.34 | |
| 29 | A | Hatem Mersal | Egypt | 6.70 | 6.95 | 7.26 | 7.26 | |
| 30 | A | Shirak Poghosyan | Armenia | 7.21 | x | x | 7.21 | |
| 31 | B | Raúl Fernández | Spain | 7.14 | 7.18 | x | 7.18 | |
| 32 | A | Pa Modou Gai | Gambia | 6.94 | 7.16 | 6.83 | 7.16 | |
| 33 | B | Josue M'Bon | Republic of the Congo | 6.98 | 6.96 | 6.97 | 6.98 | |
| 34 | A | Ellsworth Manuel | Netherlands Antilles | 6.67 | x | 6.94 | 6.94 | |
| 35 | B | Esteve Martín | Andorra | 6.85 | x | x | 6.85 | |
| 36 | B | Nai Hui-fang | Chinese Taipei | 6.83 | x | x | 6.83 | |
| 37 | B | Norberto Nsue Ondo | Equatorial Guinea | x | x | 5.77 | 5.77 | NR |
| 38 | B | Igor Streltsov | Ukraine | 5.29 | – | – | 5.29 | |

=== Final ===
| Rank | Name | Nationality | #1 | #2 | #3 | #4 | #5 | #6 | Result | Notes |
|---|---|---|---|---|---|---|---|---|---|---|
| 1st place, gold medalist(s) | Iván Pedroso | Cuba | 8.48 | – | – | – | 8.51 | 8.46 | 8.51 | =CR |
| 2nd place, silver medalist(s) | Kirill Sosunov | Russia | 8.23 | – | – | 8.00 | – | 8.41 | 8.41 | PB |
| 3rd place, bronze medalist(s) | Joe Greene | United States | 7.95 | – | 7.99 | 8.13 | 8.22 | 8.41 | 8.41 | PB |
| 4 | Erick Walder | United States | 7.97 | 8.01 | 8.16 | 8.17 | 8.24 | 8.14 | 8.24 | SB |
| 5 | James Beckford | Jamaica | 8.17 | – | 8.13 | – | – | 8.11 | 8.17 | SB |
| 6 | Yevgeniy Tretyak | Russia | 8.12 | – | 7.98 | 8.10 | – | 8.11 | 8.12 | |
| 7 | Gregor Cankar | Slovenia | – | 8.02 | – | 7.83 | 7.90 | – | 8.02 | |
| 8 | Spyros Vasdekis | Greece | – | 7.99 | 7.79 | – | 7.88 | 7.95 | 7.99 | |
| 9 | Aleksandr Glavatskiy | Belarus | – | 7.89 | 7.98 | | | | 7.98 | |
| 10 | Bogdan Tudor | Romania | 7.91 | – | 7.94 | | | | 7.94 | |
| 11 | Carlos Calado | Portugal | 7.50 | – | 7.45 | | | | 7.50 | |
| 12 | Romuald Ducros | France | 7.31 | – | – | | | | 7.31 | |
