= Rodrigue Nordin =

French sprinter (born 1971)

Rodrigue Nordin (born 22 March 1971 in Saint-Denis) is a retired French sprinter who specialized in the 200 metres.

He finished fifth at the 1998 European Championships. At the 1997 World Indoor Championships he won a bronze medal in 4 × 400 metres relay with teammates Pierre Marie Hilaire, Loïc Lerouge and Fred Mango.
