= 2001 World Championships in Athletics – Men's long jump =

These are the results of the Men's Long Jump event at the 2001 World Championships in Athletics in Edmonton, Alberta, Canada.

== Medalists ==
Gold	Iván Pedroso; Cuba (CUB)
Silver	Savante Stringfellow; United States (USA)
Bronze	Carlos Calado; Portugal (POR)

== Schedule ==
- All times are Mountain Standard Time (UTC-7)

Qualification Round
Group A	Group B
09.08.2001 – 21:10	09.08.2001 – 21:10
Final Round
11.08.2001 – 14:30

== Results ==
=== Qualification ===
Qualification: Qualifying Performance 8.15 (Q) or at least 12 best performers (q) advance to the final.

Rank	Group	Athlete	Nationality	#1	#2	#3	Result	Notes
1	B	Savante Stringfellow	United States	8.33			8.33	Q
2	B	James Beckford	Jamaica	8.05	8.19		8.19	Q
3	A	Olexiy Lukashevych	Ukraine	8.10	x		8.10	q
4	B	Kareem Streete-Thompson	Cayman Islands	8.08	7.93		8.08	q
5	A	Iván Pedroso	Cuba	8.00	7.92	x	8.00	q
6	A	Dwight Phillips	United States	7.78	7.72	7.95	7.95	q
7	A	Miguel Pate	United States	7.79	7.89	x	7.89	q
8	B	Vitaliy Shkurlatov	Russia	7.75	7.74	7.89	7.89	q
9	A	Grzegorz Marciniszyn	Poland	7.74	7.88	7.73	7.88	q
10	A	Carlos Calado	Portugal	7.73	7.88	7.67	7.88	q
11	B	Abdulrahman Al-Nubi	Qatar	7.85	x	x	7.85	q
12	A	Hussein Taher Al-Sabee	Saudi Arabia	7.65	7.83	7.73	7.83	q
13	B	Richard Duncan	Canada	7.79	x	x	7.79	
14	B	Mesut Yavas	Turkey	7.71	7.76	7.76	7.76	
15	B	Roman Shchurenko	Ukraine	7.74	x	7.62	7.74	
16	A	Kader Klouchi	France	7.09	7.54	7.70	7.70	
17	B	Luis Felipe Méliz	Cuba	7.61	7.69	7.24	7.69	
18	B	Luka Aračić	Croatia	7.51	7.61	7.68	7.68	
19	A	Danila Burkenya	Russia	7.63	7.59	7.61	7.63	
20	B	Mattias Sunneborn	Sweden	7.50	7.63	7.43	7.63	
21	B	Stephan Louw	Namibia	7.62	x	x	7.62	
22	A	Schahriar Bigdeli	Germany	7.51	7.33	7.46	7.51	
23	A	Raúl Fernández	Spain	x	x	7.47	7.47	
24	A	Arnaud Casquette	Mauritius	7.29	7.40	7.11	7.40	
25	B	Daisuke Watanabe	Japan	7.32	7.37	x	7.37	
26	A	Sanjay Kumar Raj	India	7.12	7.24	x	7.24	
27	A	Bogdan Țăruș	Romania	4.01	x	x	4.01	
	B	Gregor Cankar	Slovenia	x	x	x	NM	

=== Final ===
Rank	Athlete	Nationality	#1	#2	#3	#4	#5	#6	Result	Notes
1st place, gold medalist(s)	Iván Pedroso	Cuba	x	8.23	8.35	6.18	8.40	x	8.40	
2nd place, silver medalist(s)	Savante Stringfellow	United States	x	x	8.22	8.24	x	x	8.24	
3rd place, bronze medalist(s)	Carlos Calado	Portugal	x	8.21	x	7.92	8.18	8.01	8.21	SB
4	Miguel Pate	United States	x	8.09	7.83	7.89	8.21	7.94	8.21	
5	Kareem Streete-Thompson	Cayman Islands	7.74	8.09	8.08	8.03	8.10	8.04	8.10	
6	Olexiy Lukashevych	Ukraine	x	8.10	7.19	x	8.01	7.97	8.10	
7	James Beckford	Jamaica	7.94	x	7.97	x	x	8.08	8.08	
8	Dwight Phillips	United States	7.90	x	7.92	-			7.92	
9	Grzegorz Marciniszyn	Poland	7.32	7.92	7.78				7.92	
10	Hussein Taher Al-Sabee	Saudi Arabia	x	7.90	7.73				7.90	
11	Abdulrahman Al-Nubi	Qatar	7.63	x	x				7.63	
12	Vitaliy Shkurlatov	Russia	x	7.35	7.61				7.61	
