= 2004 IAAF World Indoor Championships – Men's long jump =

The Men's long jump event at the 2004 IAAF World Indoor Championships was held on March 5–6.

== Medalists ==
Gold	Silver	Bronze
Savanté Stringfellow; United States	James Beckford; Jamaica	Vitaliy Shkurlatov; Russia

== Results ==
=== Qualification ===
Qualifying perf. 8.00 (Q) or 8 best performers (q) advanced to the Final.

Rank	Group	Athlete	Nationality	#1	#2	#3	Result	Notes
1	A	Savanté Stringfellow	United States	8.31			8.31	Q
2	A	James Beckford	Jamaica	8.22			8.22	Q, SB
3	B	Vitaliy Shkurlatov	Russia	7.93	8.07		8.07	Q
4	A	Bogdan Țăruș	Romania	7.96	8.06		8.06	Q
5	B	Iván Pedroso	Cuba	X	8.02		8.02	Q, SB
6	A	Volodymyr Zyuskov	Ukraine	8.00			8.00	Q
7	B	Chris Tomlinson	Great Britain	7.79	7.84	7.96	7.96	q
8	A	Kirill Sosunov	Russia	7.83	7.96	X	7.96	q
9	B	Yago Lamela	Spain	7.90	7.95	7.87	7.95	
10	B	Nils Winter	Germany	7.74	7.33	7.95	7.95	
11	B	Petar Dachev	Bulgaria	7.89	7.86	7.88	7.89	SB
12	A	Zhou Can	China	7.69	7.87	X	7.87	SB
13	B	Nicola Trentin	Italy	7.84	X	X	7.84	
14	A	Mohamed Salman Al Khuwalidi	Saudi Arabia	7.80	X	X	7.80	
15	B	Yann Doménech	France	X	7.66	7.79	7.79	
16	A	Jonathan Chimier	Mauritius	7.57	7.78	7.60	7.78	
17	A	Luis Felipe Méliz	Cuba	X	X	7.71	7.71	
18	A	Gable Garenamotse	Botswana	7.45	7.68	7.53	7.68	
19	B	Brian Johnson	United States	X	7.65	5.85	7.65	
20	B	Valeriy Vasylyev	Ukraine	X	7.61	7.64	7.64	
21	B	Dimitrios Serelis	Greece	7.62	X	X	7.62	
22	B	Ndiss Kaba Badji	Senegal	7.54	7.44	7.33	7.54	
23	B	Yahya Berrabah	Morocco	X	X	7.53	7.53	SB
24	A	Siniša Ergotić	Croatia	7.44	7.45	X	7.45	
25	A	Louis Tsatoumas	Greece	X	7.34	X	7.34	
	A	Ignisious Gaisah	Ghana				DNS	

=== Final ===
Rank	Athlete	Nationality	#1	#2	#3	#4	#5	#6	Result	Notes
1st place, gold medalist(s)	Savanté Stringfellow	United States	8.07	8.08	8.40	–	–	7.70	8.40	
2nd place, silver medalist(s)	James Beckford	Jamaica	8.12	8.23	8.30	8.02	X	8.31	8.31	SB
3rd place, bronze medalist(s)	Vitaliy Shkurlatov	Russia	X	8.28	X	X	X	7.74	8.28	SB
4	Bogdan Țăruș	Romania	8.03	8.18	8.23	8.25	8.26	8.19	8.26	SB
5	Volodymyr Zyuskov	Ukraine	8.14	8.10	8.23	7.95	X	8.03	8.23	PB
6	Chris Tomlinson	Great Britain	7.97	X	8.03	7.96	8.01	8.17	8.17	NR
7	Kirill Sosunov	Russia	X	8.16	8.03	–	–	5.35	8.16	SB
8	Iván Pedroso	Cuba	X	7.96	X	X	8.09	8.00	8.09	SB
