= Marciniszyn =

Marciniszyn is a Polish surname. Notable people with the surname include:

- Grzegorz Marciniszyn (born 1977), Polish long jumper
- Marcin Marciniszyn (born 1982), Polish sprinter
