= Deon Minor =

American track and field athlete (born 1973)

Personal information
- Born: January 22, 1973 (age 53) Paris, Texas, United States

Sport
- Sport: Track and field
Medal record
Men's athletics
Representing the United States
World Indoor Championships
Gold medal – first place	1997 Paris	4 × 400 m relay
Gold medal – first place	1999 Maebashi	4 × 400 m relay
Pan American Games
Bronze medal – third place	1999 Winnipeg	4x400m relay
Pan American Junior Athletics Championships
Gold medal – first place	1991 Kingston	400 m

Deon Minor (born January 22, 1973) is an American former track and field athlete who specialized in the 400 meter dash. He won two consecutive gold medals in the relay at the IAAF World Indoor Championships from 1997 to 1999, setting a world record mark of 3:02.83 minutes in the latter competition.

== Career ==
Minor grew up in Paris, Texas and his first international success came in 1991 when he won the 400 m title at the Pan American Junior Athletics Championships. He chose to attend Baylor University in 1992 on an athletic scholarship in the knowledge of the athletic program's strength in the 400 m under coach Clyde Hart. During his time at the college he earned 14 All-American honours and won four NCAA titles.

He was the 400 m NCAA Indoor champion in 1992 and 1995. He twice shared in the NCAA 4 × 400-meter relay title with his Baylor teammates, winning indoors in 1992 and outdoors in 1995. He set a personal record of 44.75 seconds in Austin, Texas in June 1992 and went on to take the world junior title in Seoul later that year, winning the 400 m at the 1992 World Junior Championships in Athletics.

After graduating in 1995, he continued to focus on track and aimed to qualify for the 1996 Atlanta Olympics. However, at the United States Olympic Trials he was eliminated in the semi-finals. He finished in the top three at the 1997 USA Indoor Track and Field Championships and was selected for the 1997 IAAF World Indoor Championships. He came fourth in his 400 m semi-final at the worlds, being eliminated before the final, but anchored the US men's relay team (with Jason Rouser, Mark Everett, and Sean Maye) to the gold medal in a time of 3:04.93 minutes.

He came third at the 1999 national indoor championships behind Angelo Taylor and Milton Campbell, again earning qualification to the global championships. At the 1999 IAAF World Indoor Championships, he was again eliminated in the 400 m semi-finals. The American relay team (Andre Morris, Dameon Johnson, Minor and Campbell) repeated their gold medal of two years earlier but this time set a world record for the relay, taking the victory in a time of 3:02.83 minutes. Minor competed at the USA Outdoor Track and Field Championships in the summer and took sixth place in the 400 m final. In his final year at the top level of track and field, he ran at the 2000 Olympic Track Trials, but he finished sixth in the heats stage.

His world record relay mark was beaten in 2006 by a team of Kerron Clement, Wallace Spearmon, Darold Williamson and Jeremy Wariner. However, their mark of 3:01.96 minutes was never ratified as an official world record as no post-race EPO test was conducted, meaning that Minor's time remained the official world record.

== Personal life ==
He joined the Kappa Alpha Psi fraternity while at Baylor. He now works as the Client Manager for Ultimate Performance, an athlete representation company founded by Michael Johnson. He has a son and a daughter with his wife.
