= Andre Morris =

American sprinter

Personal information
- Born: October 26, 1972 (age 53)
- Height: 179 cm (5 ft 10 in)

Sport
- Sport: Athletics
- Event: Sprint

Achievements and titles
- Personal bests: 200 m – 20.48 (1999); 400 m – 44.89 (1995)
Medal record
Representing United States
World Indoor Championships
Gold medal – first place	1999 Maebashi	4 × 400 m
Universiade
Gold medal – first place	1995 Fukuoka	4 × 400 m

Andre Morris (born October 26, 1972) is an American former sprint runner. He was part of American 4 × 400 m relay teams that won gold medals at the 1995 Summer Universiade and 1999 IAAF World Indoor Championships, setting a world indoor record in 1999.

== Early life and family ==
Morris was one of five children born to Frankie Morris. He has one sister and three brothers. He also has six children.

Morris attended Russellville High School in Russellville, Kentucky. At 5 ft 10 1/2 in (1.79 m), he was told he was too small to play football, but he began earning playing time as a sophomore following an injury to another player. He was named a Blue Chip All-American in football three times. Playing tailback, he was the scoring leader on Russellville's 1990 team that won the Class A state championship. He also competed on the track and field team, winning state titles in the 400 m and the 4 × 400 m relay.

== College career ==
Morris graduated from high school in 1991. Despite being recruited by traditional football powerhouses Michigan and Penn State, he followed a high school teammate to Hutchinson Community College in Hutchinson, Kansas. In his second week at the school, he suffered an ankle injury. Soon after, his friend left Hutchinson, and Morris never played in a game for the school. He continued running track and was named a Junior College All-American, earning him a scholarship to the University of Iowa.

Attracted by the fact that the school's head track coach and one assistant coach were both African-Americans like himself, Morris enrolled at Iowa in the spring 1994 semester. Although he considered trying out for the football team, he decided to stick with track and twice won the 200 m at the Big Ten outdoor championships. He also won the 400 m once and was twice a member of the championship 4 × 400 m relay team. One year, he won the 400 m, but was disqualified. At the 1995 World University Games, Morris and his teammates broke the Games record in the 4 × 400 m relay with a time of 3:00.40.

In 1994 and 1996, Morris was named an NCAA Division I All-American in the 4 × 400 m relay and in 1995, he was an All-American in the 400 m. At the team's awards banquet in 1995, Morris was named most valuable team member, most outstanding sprinter, most improved member, and shared the most inspirational award with his relay teammates. He graduated in summer 1996 with a bachelor's degree in art history.

== International career ==
After graduation, Morris moved to Iowa City, Iowa, where he worked as a cook and a janitor while training for a career as a professional athlete. He did not hire a coach, but in 2001, he was reported to run the 40-yard dash in 4.1 seconds and bench press 365 pounds (166 kg). He qualified to compete at both the indoor and outdoor U.S. National Championships eight times. In 1996 and 2000, he participated in the United States Olympic Trials. At the 1999 World Indoor Championships, he, Dameon Johnson, Deon Minor, and Milton Campbell formed a 4 × 400 m relay team that set a world record, completing the race in 3:02.83. The team received $60,000 for the feat. The record was broken in 2015.

Despite his success, Morris told The Gazette in 1999, "I hate track. I'm doing it because I can do it. I love football more than anything." That year, he joined the semi-professional Iowa Tractors for their inaugural season in the South Central Football League, playing wide receiver, running back and returning punts and kickoffs. After a successful stint with the Tractors, he tried out for the National Football League's Carolina Panthers, but was hampered by a knee injury.
