= Milton Campbell =

American sprinter

Personal information
- Born: May 15, 1976 (age 50)
Medal record
Men's athletics
Representing United States
World Indoor Championships
Silver medal – second place	1999 Maebashi	400 m
Gold medal – first place	1999 Maebashi	4 × 400 m relay
Silver medal – second place	2001 Lisbon	400 m
Gold medal – first place	2006 Moscow	4 × 400 m relay

Milton Campbell (born May 15, 1976) is a former track and field athlete from the United States who mainly competed in the 400 metres.

His success comes during the indoor season. At the 1999 IAAF World Indoor Championships he set a world record of 3:02.83m over 4 × 400 metres relay together with Andre Morris, Dameon Johnson and Deon Minor.

Campbell won the American Indoor Championships over 400 metres in 2004 and 2006.

Campbell is originally from Atlanta, Georgia. He was a junior state, regional, and national champion runner with Quicksilver Track Club from Atlanta. In junior track, Campbell was as dominant in the 1500 meters as he was in the 800 and 400 meters. In college, he competed for the North Carolina Tar Heels track and field team.

Campbell was a state champion in the 400 and 800 meters for Douglass High School of northwest Atlanta in Georgia's then-largest division, 4A.

== Personal bests ==
- 200 metres – 20.47 (2002) – Atlanta, United States
- 400 metres – 44.67 (1997) – Stuttgart, Germany
- 800 metres – 1:50.96 (2004) – Atlanta, United States
- 4 × 400 meters relay – 3:02.83 (1999) – Maebashi, Japan

== Achievements ==
Year	Competition	Venue	Position	Event	Notes
Representing the United States
1994	World Junior Championships	Lisbon, Portugal	1st	4 × 400 m relay	3:03.32
1999	World Indoor Championships	Maebashi, Japan	2nd	400 metres	45.99
1999	World Indoor Championships	Maebashi, Japan	1st	4 × 400 m relay	3:02.83 WR
2001	World Indoor Championships	Lisbon, Portugal	2nd	400 metres	46.45
2003	World Indoor Championships	Birmingham, United Kingdom	—	4 × 400 m relay	DQ
2004	World Indoor Championships	Budapest, Hungary	5th	400 metres	46.74
2006	World Indoor Championships	Moscow, Russia	5th	400 metres	46.15
2006	World Indoor Championships	Moscow, Russia	1st	4 × 400 m relay	3:03.24
