= 2001 IAAF World Indoor Championships – Men's long jump =

The men's long jump event at the 2001 IAAF World Indoor Championships was held on March 11.

== Results ==
Rank	Athlete	Nationality	#1	#2	#3	#4	#5	#6	Result	Notes
1st place, gold medalist(s)	Iván Pedroso	Cuba	7.95	X	8.43	X	X	–	8.43	WL
2nd place, silver medalist(s)	Kareem Streete-Thompson	Cayman Islands	8.16	8.16	6.27	X	–	–	8.16	NR
3rd place, bronze medalist(s)	Carlos Calado	Portugal	8.11	8.16	X	8.12	X	7.98	8.16	NR
4	Peter Burge	Australia	7.67	7.90	X	X	8.11	X	8.11	=AR
5	Melvin Lister	United States	8.10	X	–	–	–	X	8.10	SB
6	Kevin Dilworth	United States	7.79	7.69	7.76	7.95	7.85	7.97	7.97	SB
7	Vladimir Malyavin	Russia	7.12	X	7.80	X	7.93	7.94	7.94	
8	Vitaliy Shkurlatov	Russia	X	7.76	7.80	X	X	7.77	7.80	
9	Luis Méliz	Cuba	7.62	7.59	7.69				7.69	
10	Younés Moudrik	Morocco	X	X	7.68				7.68	
11	Hussein Taher Al-Sabee	Saudi Arabia	6.40	X	7.53				7.53	
12	Petar Dachev	Bulgaria	7.45	7.45	5.55				7.45	
