= Danial Jahić =

Serbian long jumper (1979–2021)

Personal information
- Nationality: Serbian
- Born: 1 July 1979
- Died: 19 January 2021 (aged 41) Lelić, Serbia
- Height: 1.91 m (6 ft 3 in)

Sport
- Sport: Athletics
- Event: Long jump

Danial Jahić (Serbian Cyrillic: Даниал Јахић; 1 July 1979 – 19 January 2021) was a Serbian long jumper. He competed at the 2000 Summer Olympics. He was national indoor record holder for 20 years.

== Career ==
He finished fifth at the 1998 World Junior Championships, tenth at the 1999 European U23 Championships, eighth at the 2000 European Indoor Championships, ninth at the 2001 European U23 Championships and fourth at the 2001 Mediterranean Games. He also competed at the 1996 World Junior Championships, the 1998 European Championships, the 1999 World Championships, the men's long jump and the 2002 European Indoor Championships without reaching the final.

In regional Balkan meets, he won the 1998 Balkan Indoor Championships, the 1998 Balkan Games, the 1999 Balkan Indoor Championships and won the silver medal at the 2000 Balkan Indoor Championships. He also became national champion in 1999, 2000, 2001, 2003 and 2005.

His personal best jump was 8.18 metres, achieved in May 1999 in Rethymno. He was national indoor record holder for 20 years with 8.02m until 2019 when Strahinja Jovančević surpassed him.

== Death ==
Jahić died on 19 January 2021, at the age of 41, after COVID-19-related complications during the pandemic in Serbia.
