= Vitaliy Shkurlatov =

Russian long jumper (born 1979)

Vitaliy Shkurlatov (Russian: Вита́лий Шкурла́тов; born 25 May 1979, in Volgograd) is a Russian long jumper. His personal best is 8.23 metres, achieved in August 2003 in Tula.

== International competitions ==
Representing Russia
Year	Competition	Venue	Position	Event	Result	Notes
1998	World Junior Championships	Annecy, France	8th	Long jump	7.61 m	wind: +0.8 m/s
1999	European U23 Championships	Gothenburg, Sweden	2nd	Long jump	8.02 m	wind: +1.7 m/s
2000	European Indoor Championships	Ghent, Belgium	3rd	Long jump	8.10 m	
2001	World Indoor Championships	Lisbon, Portugal	8th	Long jump	7.80 m	
2001	World Championships	Edmonton, Canada	12th	Long jump	7.61 m	
2002	European Indoor Championships	Vienna, Austria	7th	Long jump	7.95 m	
2004	World Indoor Championships	Budapest, Hungary	3rd	Long jump	8.28 m	
2004	Olympic Games	Athens, Greece	9th	Long jump	8.04 m	
2004	World Athletics Final	Monte Carlo, Monaco	8th	Long jump	7.60 m	
2005	World Championships	Helsinki, Finland	10th	Long jump	7.88 m	

== National titles ==
- Russian Athletics Championships
  - Long jump: 2003, 2004, 2005, 2009
