= Miguel Pate =

American track and field athlete

Personal information
- Born: June 13, 1979 (age 47) St. Francisville, Louisiana, United States

Sport
- Sport: Track and field
Medal record
Representing United States
World Indoor Championships
Bronze medal – third place	2003 Birmingham	Long jump
Summer Universiade
Gold medal – first place	2001 Beijing	Long jump

Miguel Pate (born June 13, 1979) is an American track and field athlete. His speciality is the long jump, although during his high school and collegiate career he also competed in the triple jump, high jump, 100 m, 200 m, 4 × 100 m relay, and 4 × 400 m.

== Biography ==
Miguel "Stay out them boxes" Pate attended West Feliciana High School in Louisiana from 1994 to 1997. After graduating West Feliciana High School he attended Meridian Community College from 1997 until 1999 where he excelled in the triple jump and long jump and addition to playing on the basketball team his freshman year. His first year he had a personal best of 50 ft 7 1/4 in (15.42 m) in the triple jump and 25 ft 2 1/2 in (7.68 m) in the long jump. Pate finished fourth at the National Junior College Athletic Association (NJCAA) Track and Field Championships in the long jump. The following year he won the NJCAA Championship in the triple jump and had a wind aided personal best of 52 ft 7 in (16.03 m).

The following year Pate transferred to the University of Alabama. At the University of Alabama Pate continued to improve under the tutelage of Rod Tiffin. At the University of Alabama Pate won the 2001 Summer Universiade and was an All American several times while competing for the Alabama Crimson Tide. However, Miguel had not yet won an NCAA Championship.

In 2002 Pate had his breakout season. Pate turned down the opportunity to sign a professional track and field contract in order to finish his eligibility. Because Pate played basketball in the winter of his freshman year at Meridian Junior College he had eligibility to compete during the NCAA indoor track and field season. Miguel began his season with a jump of 27 ft 4 in (8.33 m) and remained undefeated all season going into the USA Indoor Track and Field Championships. At the meet Pate jumped 28 ft 2 1/4 in (8.592 m) and won the competition by nearly two feet; with this jump, Pate also became the NCAA Indoor Long Jump record holder. Only two people have ever jumped farther indoors in human history. Pate went on to win the NCAA Championship in the long jump and was runner up in the triple jump. In the spring Pate signed a professional contract with Nike.

As a professional Pate has had a rocky career. He began the spring of 2002 with several jumps over 27 feet (8.2 m). He was second at the USATF Outdoor Championships and finished the year ranked 2nd in the world. In 2003 Pate continued his success by winning the USATF Indoor Championship in the long jump. However, at a meet in Oregon in the spring Pate injured his knee, tearing his ACL, MCL as well as other ligaments, ending his season and putting his career in jeopardy. Pate tried to return to form in 2004 but only managed to jump 26 ft 1 1/2 in (7.96 m) that year in limited action. In 2005 Pate showed the form he had before the injury by winning the USATF Outdoor Championship in the long jump over 2004 Olympic Gold Medalist Dwight Phillips with a leap of 27 ft 4 1/2 in (8.34 m). In 2006, Pate finished 3rd at the USATF Outdoor Championships with a jump of (7.96m/26-1.5) and had a season best jump at the Nike Prefontaine Classic (8.27m/27-1.75). Pate finished the year ranked 7th in the world (#2 in the U.S.) by T&FN. In 2007, Pate finished 2nd at the USATF Outdoor Championships (8.24m/27-0.5) and qualified for the World Outdoor Championships in Osaka, Japan where he placed 10th (7.94m/26-0.75). Pate finished the 2007 season ranked #3 in the U.S. by T&FN. In 2008, Pate finished 3rd at the USATF Outdoor Championships/Olympic Trials with a jump of (8.22/26-11.75) which qualified him for the 2008 Olympic Games in Beijing.

== Achievements ==
Year	Competition	Venue	Position	Notes
Representing the United States
2000	NACAC U25 Championships	Monterrey, Mexico	1st	7.68 m (wind: +0.4 m/s)
2001	World Championships	Edmonton, Canada	4th	8.21 m
2001	Universiade	Beijing, China	1st	8.07 m
2003	World Indoor Championships	Birmingham, United Kingdom	3rd	8.21 m
2005	World Championships	Helsinki, Finland	16th (q)	7.70 m
2007	World Championships	Osaka, Japan	10th	7.94 m
2008	Olympic Games	Beijing, China	38th (q)	7.34 m
2009	World Championships	Berlin, Germany	38th (q)	7.61 m

== Personal bests ==
- Long Jump - 28 ft 2 1/4 in (8.592 m)
- Triple Jump - 54 ft 6 1/2 in (16.6 m)

Sporting positions
Preceded by Iván Pedroso	Men's Long Jump Best Year Performance; 2002	Succeeded by Yago Lamela
