= 2000 European Athletics Indoor Championships – Men's long jump =

The men's long jump event at the 2000 European Athletics Indoor Championships was held on February 25–26.

== Medalists ==
Gold	Silver	Bronze
Petar Dachev; Bulgaria	Bogdan Țăruș; Romania	Vitaliy Shkurlatov; Russia

== Results ==
=== Qualification ===
Qualifying perf. 7.95 (Q) or 8 best performers (q) advanced to the Final.

Rank	Athlete	Nationality	#1	#2	#3	Result	Note
1	Petar Dachev	Bulgaria	7.70	8.04		8.04	Q
2	Olexiy Lukashevych	Ukraine	8.01			8.01	Q
3	Bogdan Țăruș	Romania	7.65	7.80	7.98	7.98	Q
4	Gregor Cankar	Slovenia	7.35	7.70	7.92	7.92	q
5	Bogdan Tudor	Romania	X	7.70	7.90	7.90	q
6	Emmanuel Bangué	France	X	7.69	7.89	7.89	q
7	Vitaliy Shkurlatov	Russia	7.64	7.74	7.88	7.88	q
8	Danial Jahić	Yugoslavia	7.84	7.64	7.62	7.84	q
9	Konstadinos Koukodimos	Greece	7.74	7.73	7.83	7.83	
10	Grzegorz Marciniszyn	Poland	7.81	7.63	7.73	7.81	
11	Carlos Calado	Portugal	7.81	7.68	X	7.81	
12	Roman Shchurenko	Ukraine	7.72	X	7.73	7.73	
13	Sergej Rozman	Slovenia	7.63	X	7.70	7.70	
14	Erik Nys	Belgium	7.58	7.68	7.49	7.68	
15	Konstantin Krause	Germany	7.65	7.61	–	7.65	
16	Dimitrios Serelis	Greece	X	7.57	7.41	7.57	
17	Romuald Ducros	France	5.87	X	7.56	7.56	
18	Mattias Sunneborn	Sweden	7.54	7.54	7.49	7.54	
19	Tamas Margi	Hungary	7.32	7.54	7.45	7.54	
20	Diego Boschiero	Italy	X	7.49	X	7.49	
21	Dimitrios Filindras	Greece	7.44	X	X	7.44	
22	Esteve Martín	Andorra	7.14	7.04	7.12	7.14	
23	Rashid Chouhal	Malta	X	7.10	X	7.10	

=== Final ===
Rank	Athlete	Nationality	#1	#2	#3	#4	#5	#6	Result	Note
1st place, gold medalist(s)	Petar Dachev	Bulgaria	7.97	8.24	8.11	–	7.92	8.26	8.26	PB
2nd place, silver medalist(s)	Bogdan Țăruș	Romania	8.02	8.05	8.03	7.88	8.19	8.20	8.20	
3rd place, bronze medalist(s)	Vitaliy Shkurlatov	Russia	7.95	X	7.92	X	8.10	8.03	8.10	
4	Olexiy Lukashevych	Ukraine	X	8.02	X	7.93	X	X	8.02	
5	Gregor Cankar	Slovenia	X	7.75	7.85	7.75	7.88	7.94	7.94	
6	Emmanuel Bangué	France	7.65	7.82	X	X	7.79	X	7.82	
7	Bogdan Tudor	Romania	X	X	X	7.42	7.57	7.80	7.80	
8	Danial Jahić	Yugoslavia	7.72	7.53	X	X	7.69	7.49	7.72	
