= Erick Walder =

American long jumper (born 1971)

Personal information
- Born: November 5, 1971 (age 54) Mobile, Alabama, U.S.
Medal record
Men's athletics
Representing United States
World Championships
Silver medal – second place	1997 Athens	Long jump

Erick Walder (born November 5, 1971, in Mobile, Alabama) is an American former long jumper. He was a silver medalist at the 1997 World Championships in Athletics and twice bronze medallist at the IAAF World Indoor Championships (1995, 1999). He also took two silver medals at the Goodwill Games (1994, 1998).

His personal best was 8.74 meters, achieved in April 1994 in El Paso. He ranked number one in the world on performance in the 1994 and 1996 seasons.

== Collegiate career ==
Walder competed collegiately for the long jump/triple jump juggernaut University of Arkansas where he won 10 NCAA long jump and triple jump titles, indoor and outdoor. He still holds the collegiate outdoor long jump record with a leap of 28 feet 8.25 inches (8.7440 meters). Walder was inducted into The University of Arkansas Hall of Fame in 2010.

Walder claimed the NCAA outdoor and indoor long jumps and the indoor triple jump titles in 1992, 1993 and 1994, and added the outdoor triple jump win to sweep the 1994 NCAA meets:

Event	Years won
NCAA Indoor Triple Jump	1992, 1993, 1994
NCAA Indoor Long Jump	1992, 1993, 1994
NCAA Outdoor Triple Jump	1994
NCAA Outdoor Long Jump	1992, 1993, 1994

Walder finished 3rd in the triple jump at the 1993 NCAA Outdoor Championships.

== International competitions ==
Year	Competition	Venue	Position	Event	Notes
Representing the United States
1990	World Junior Championships	Plovdiv, Bulgaria	15th	Triple jump	15.00 m (wind: -0.8 m/s)
1993	World Championships	Stuttgart, Germany	4th	Long jump	8.05 m
1994	Goodwill Games	St. Petersburg, Russia	2nd	Long jump	8.39 m
1995	World Indoor Championships	Barcelona, Spain	3rd	Long jump	8.14 m
1997	World Indoor Championships	Paris, France	4th	Long jump	8.24 m
1997	World Championships	Athens, Greece	2nd	Long jump	8.38 m
1997	IAAF Grand Prix Final	Fukuoka, Japan	3rd	Long jump	8.40 m w
1998	Goodwill Games	Uniondale, United States	2nd	Long jump	8.38 m
1999	World Indoor Championships	Maebashi, Japan	3rd	Long jump	8.30 m

== Rankings ==
Walder was ranked in the top ten long jumpers in the world by Track and Field News for eight consecutive years and as the best long jumper in the US three times.

Year	LJ world rank	LJ US rank	TJ US rank
1992	6th	4th	-
1993	3rd	2nd	5th
1994	3rd	3rd	3rd
1995	8th	6th	-
1996	6th	4th	6th
1997	3rd	1st	-
1998	2nd	1st	-
1999	4th	1st	-
2000	-	6th	-

== Drug issues ==
In 2004, Walder tested positive for a legal medication that is banned by USATF. The sample was delivered on June 5, 2004, at the IAAF Adidas Oregon Track Classic. He received an IAAF suspension from October 2004 to October 2006. Walder was reinstated in 2007. He competed professionally for two years before his retirement in 2010.

== Personal life ==
In April 2014, Walder married Denise Chandler, a chiropractor. They reside with their son, EJ in Fayetteville. He has another son, Trenton Walder, who resides in Conway, Arkansas. They divorced in February 2018.

Sporting positions
Preceded by Mike Powell; Iván Pedroso	Men's Long Jump Best Year Performance; 1994; 1996	Succeeded by Iván Pedroso; Iván Pedroso
