= 2003 USA Indoor Track and Field Championships =

- Dates: February 28–March 2
- Host city: Boston, Massachusetts, United States
- Venue: Reggie Lewis Track and Athletic Center
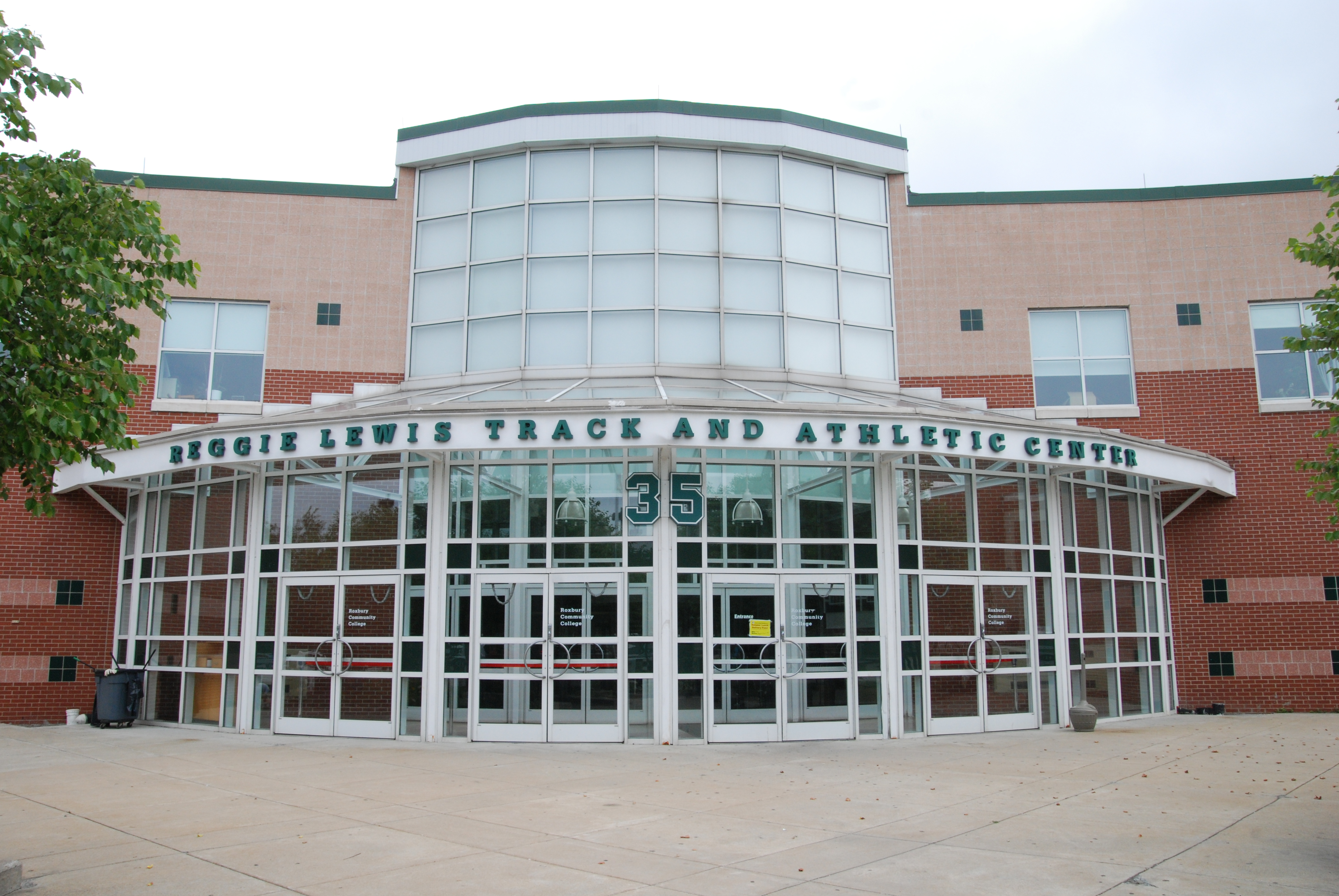
- Level: Senior
- Type: Indoor
- Events: 30 (15 men's + 15 women's)

The 2003 USA Indoor Track and Field Championships were held at the Reggie Lewis Track and Athletic Center in Boston, Massachusetts. Organized by USA Track and Field (USATF), the two-day competition took place February 28–March 2 and served as the national championships in indoor track and field for the United States. The championships in combined track and field events were held at a different time.

The competition served as a qualifying event for the U.S. team at the 2003 World Indoor Championships in Athletics. The meeting was highlighted by Gail Devers breaking the American record in the 60 m hurdles.

== Medal summary ==
=== Men ===
| Event | Gold | | Silver | Bronze |
|---|---|---|---|---|
| 60 m | Justin Gatlin | 6.45 | | |
| 200 m | John Capel | 20.69 | | |
| 400 m | Tyree Washington | 46.43 | | |
| 800 m | David Krummenacker | 1:50.59 | | |
| 1500 m | Jason Lunn | 3:42.23 | | |
| 3000 m | Jonathon Riley | 7:49.79 | | |
| 60 m hurdles | Allen Johnson | 7.39 | | |
| High jump | Charles Austin | 2.30 m | | |
| Pole vault | Derek Miles | 5.75 m | | |
| Long jump | Miguel Pate | 8.25 m | | |
| Triple jump | Tim Rusan | 17.45 m | | |
| Shot put | Kevin Toth | 21.30 m | | |
| Weight throw | A.G. Kruger | 22.25 m | | |
| Heptathlon | Paul Terek | 5870 pts | | |
| 5000 m walk | Tim Seaman | 19:21.56 | | |

=== Women ===
| Event | Gold | | Silver | Bronze |
|---|---|---|---|---|
| 60 m | Angela Williams | 7.16 | | |
| 200 m | Allyson Felix | 23.14 | | |
| 400 m | Monique Hennagan | 52.54 | | |
| 800 m | Nicole Teter | 2:00.09 | | |
| 1500 m | Regina Jacobs | 4:15.81 | | |
| 3000 m | Regina Jacobs | 8:52.57 | | |
| 60 m hurdles | Gail Devers | 7.85 | | |
| High jump | Tisha Waller | 1.97 m | | |
| Pole vault | Stacy Dragila | 4.78 m | | |
| Long jump | Kiamesha Otey | 6.33 m | | |
| Triple jump | Vanitta Kinard | 13.72 m | | |
| Shot put | Kristin Heaston | 18.03 m | | |
| Weight throw | Anna Mahon | 22.85 m | | |
| Pentathlon | Tiffany Lott-Hogan | 4317 pts | | |
| 3000 m walk | Joanne Dow | 13:07.68 | | |
