= 1997 IAAF World Indoor Championships =

6th IAAF World Indoor Championships
- Official competition logo
- Dates: 7 March–9 March
- Host city: Paris, France
- Venue: Palais Omnisports de Paris-Bercy
- Events: 28
- Participation: 712 athletes from 118 nations

The 6th IAAF World Indoor Championships in Athletics were held at the Palais Omnisports de Paris-Bercy in Paris, France from March 7 to March 9, 1997. It was the first athletic championships to introduce women's pole vault. There were a total number of 712 participating athletes from 118 countries.

== Results ==
=== Men ===
1993 | 1995 | 1997 | 1999 | 2001

Event	Gold		Silver		Bronze	
60 metres	Haralabos Papadias; Greece	6.50 (NR)	Michael Green; Jamaica	6.51	Davidson Ezinwa; Nigeria	6.52 (PB)
200 metres	Kevin Little; United States	20.40 (CR)	Iván García; Cuba	20.46 (PB)	Francis Obikwelu; Nigeria	21.10
400 metres	Sunday Bada; Nigeria	45.51 (AR)	Jamie Baulch; Great Britain	45.62	Shunji Karube; Japan	45.76 (AR)
800 metres	Wilson Kipketer; Denmark	1:42.67 (WR)	Mahjoub Haida; Morocco	1:45.76 (NR)	Rich Kenah; United States	1:46.16 (PB)
1500 metres	Hicham El Guerrouj; Morocco	3:35.31 (CR)	Rüdiger Stenzel; Germany	3:37.24	William Tanui; Kenya	3:37.48
3000 metres	Haile Gebrselassie; Ethiopia	7:34.71 (CR)	Paul Bitok; Kenya	7:38.84	Ismaïl Sghyr; Morocco	7:40.01
60 metres hurdles	Anier García; Cuba	7.48 (NR)	Colin Jackson; Great Britain	7.49	Tony Dees; United States	7.50
4 × 400 metres relay	United States; Jason Rouser; Mark Everett; Sean Maye; Deon Minor	3:04.93	Jamaica; Linval Laird; Michael McDonald; Dinsdale Morgan; Gregory Haughton	3:08.11	France; Pierre-Marie Hilaire; Rodrigue Nordin; Loïc Lerouge; Fred Mango	3:09.68
High jump	Charles Austin; United States	2.35	Lambros Papakostas; Greece	2.32	Dragutin Topić; Yugoslavia	2.32
Pole vault	Igor Potapovich; Kazakhstan	5.90 (AR)	Lawrence Johnson; United States	5.85	Maksim Tarasov; Russia	5.80
Long jump	Iván Pedroso; Cuba	8.51 (CR)	Kirill Sosunov; Russia	8.41 (PB)	Joe Greene; United States	8.41 (PB)
Triple jump	Yoel García; Cuba	17.30	Aliecer Urrutia; Cuba	17.27	Aleksandr Aseledchenko; Russia	17.22 (PB)
Shot put	Yuriy Bilonog; Ukraine	21.02	Aleksandr Bagach; Ukraine	20.94	John Godina; United States	20.87
Heptathlon	Robert Změlík; Czech Republic	6228	Erki Nool; Estonia	6213 (PB)	Jón Magnússon; Iceland	6145 (NR)

=== Women ===
1993 | 1995 | 1997 | 1999 | 2001

Event	Gold		Silver		Bronze	
60 metres	Gail Devers; United States	7.06	Chandra Sturrup; Bahamas	7.15	Frederique Bangue; France	7.17
200 metres	Ekaterini Koffa; Greece	22.76 (NR)	Juliet Cuthbert; Jamaica	22.77	Svetlana Goncharenko; Russia	22.85
400 metres	Jearl Miles Clark; United States	50.96 (WL)	Sandie Richards; Jamaica	51.17 (PB)	Helena Fuchsová; Czech Republic	52.04 (PB)
800 metres	Maria Mutola; Mozambique	1:58.96	Natalya Dukhnova; Belarus	1:59.31 (NR)	Joetta Clark; United States	1:59.82 (PB)
1500 metres	Yekaterina Podkopayeva; Russia	4:05.19 (PB)	Patricia Djaté-Taillard; France	4:06.16 (NR)	Lidia Chojecka; Poland	4:06.25 (NR)
3000 metres	Gabriela Szabo; Romania	8:45.75	Sonia O'Sullivan; Ireland	8:46.19 (NR)	Fernanda Ribeiro; Portugal	8:49.79
60 metres hurdles	Michelle Freeman; Jamaica	7.82 (=CR)	Gillian Russell; Jamaica	7.84 (PB)	Cheryl Dickey; United States	7.84 (PB)
60 metres hurdles	Michelle Freeman; Jamaica	7.82 (=CR)	Gillian Russell; Jamaica	7.84 (PB)	Patricia Girard; France	7.84 (SB)
4 × 400 metres relay	Russia; Tatyana Chebykina; Svetlana Goncharenko; Olga Kotlyarova; Tatyana Alekseyeva	3:26.84 (WR)	United States; Shanelle Porter; Natasha Kaiser-Brown; Anita Howard; Jearl Miles Clark	3:27.66 (AR)	Germany; Anja Rücker; Anke Feller; Heike Meissner; Grit Breuer	3:28.39
High jump	Stefka Kostadinova; Bulgaria	2.02	Inga Babakova; Ukraine	2.00 (NR)	Hanne Haugland; Norway	2.00 (NR)
Pole vault	Stacy Dragila; United States	4.40 (WR)	Emma George; Australia	4.35	Cai Weiyan; China	4.35 (AR)
Long jump	Fiona May; Italy	6.86 (NR)	Chioma Ajunwa; Nigeria	6.80	Agata Karczmarek; Poland	6.71 (PB)
Triple jump	Inna Lasovskaya; Russia	15.01 (WL)	Ashia Hansen; Great Britain	14.70 (NR)	Šárka Kašpárková; Czech Republic	14.66 (NR)
Shot put	Vita Pavlysh; Ukraine	20.00	Astrid Kumbernuss; Germany	19.92	Irina Korzhanenko; Russia	19.49 (PB)
Pentathlon	Sabine Braun; Germany	4780	Mona Steigauf; Germany	4681 (PB)	Kym Carter; United States	4627

- Mary Slaney of USA originally came second in the 1500 metre and was awarded the silver medal, but was later disqualified for doping.

== Medal table ==
Rank	Nation	Gold	Silver	Bronze	Total
1	United States (USA)	6	2	7	15
2	Cuba (CUB)	3	2	0	5
3	Russia (RUS)	3	1	4	8
4	Ukraine (UKR)	2	2	0	4
5	Greece (GRE)	2	1	0	3
6	Jamaica (JAM)	1	5	0	6
7	Germany (GER)	1	3	1	5
8	Nigeria (NGA)	1	1	2	4
9	Morocco (MAR)	1	1	1	3
10	Czech Republic (CZE)	1	0	2	3
11	Bulgaria (BGR)	1	0	0	1
11	Denmark (DEN)	1	0	0	1
11	Ethiopia (ETH)	1	0	0	1
11	Italy (ITA)	1	0	0	1
11	Kazakhstan (KAZ)	1	0	0	1
11	Mozambique (MOZ)	1	0	0	1
11	Romania (ROM)	1	0	0	1
18	Great Britain (GBR)	0	3	0	3
19	France (FRA)	0	1	3	4
20	Kenya (KEN)	0	1	1	2
21	Australia (AUS)	0	1	0	1
21	Bahamas (BAH)	0	1	0	1
21	Belarus (BLR)	0	1	0	1
21	Estonia (EST)	0	1	0	1
21	Ireland (IRL)	0	1	0	1
26	Poland (POL)	0	0	2	2
27	China (CHN)	0	0	1	1
27	Iceland (ISL)	0	0	1	1
27	Japan (JPN)	0	0	1	1
27	Norway (NOR)	0	0	1	1
27	Portugal (POR)	0	0	1	1
27	Yugoslavia (FR Yugoslavia)	0	0	1	1
Totals (32 entries)		28	28	29	85

== Participating nations ==
- Algeria (1)
- Andorra (1)
- Antigua and Barbuda (1)
- Argentina (4)
- Armenia (2)
- Aruba (1)
- Australia (6)
- Austria (10)
- Azerbaijan (1)
- Bahamas (7)
- Belarus (4)
- Belgium (10)
- Benin (2)
- Bermuda (2)
- Bolivia (1)
- Bosnia and Herzegovina (1)
- Brazil (16)
- Bulgaria (4)
- Burkina Faso (1)
- Burundi (1)
- Cameroon (2)
- Canada (8)
- Central African Republic (1)
- Chad (1)
- Chile (1)
- China (18)
- Chinese Taipei (2)
- Croatia (1)
- Cuba (10)
- Cyprus (2)
- Czech Republic (18)
- Denmark (7)
- Dominica (2)
- Egypt (1)
- Equatorial Guinea (1)
- Estonia (2)
- Ethiopia (4)
- Finland (6)
- France (44)
- Gabon (1)
- Gambia (1)
- Germany (34)
- Ghana (4)
- Great Britain (40)
- Greece (14)
- Guinea (1)
- Haiti (1)
- Hungary (14)
- Iceland (3)
- Ireland (8)
- Israel (5)
- Italy (25)
- Ivory Coast (3)
- Jamaica (17)
- Japan (10)
- Kazakhstan (4)
- Kenya (5)
- Kyrgyzstan (2)
- Kuwait (1)
- Latvia (4)
- Lebanon (2)
- Liberia (1)
- Lithuania (3)
- Luxembourg (1)
- Madagascar (2)
- Malaysia (1)
- Mali (2)
- Malta (2)
- Mauritania (1)
- Mauritius (1)
- Mexico (4)
- Moldova (2)
- Mongolia (1)
- Mozambique (2)
- Morocco (8)
- Netherlands (5)
- Netherlands Antilles (1)
- New Zealand (4)
- Nigeria (9)
- Norway (10)
- Pakistan (1)
- Papua New Guinea (1)
- Paraguay (1)
- Peru (1)
- Philippines (1)
- Poland (12)
- Portugal (7)
- Puerto Rico (1)
- Qatar (3)
- Republic of the Congo (1)
- Romania (11)
- Russia (42)
- Rwanda (2)
- Saint Vincent and the Grenadines (1)
- El Salvador (1)
- Senegal (1)
- Saudi Arabia (1)
- Sierra Leone (2)
- Slovakia (3)
- Slovenia (7)
- South Africa (3)
- South Korea (1)
- Spain (23)
- Suriname (1)
- Sweden (10)
- Switzerland (5)
- Tajikistan (1)
- Tanzania (1)
- Trinidad and Tobago (3)
- Tunisia (1)
- Turkey (2)
- Uganda (1)
- Ukraine (27)
- United States (54)
- United States Virgin Islands (2)
- Yugoslavia (4)
- Zaire (1)
- Zambia (1)
- Zimbabwe (2)

== See also ==
- 1997 in athletics (track and field)
