= 1999 European Athletics U23 Championships – Men's long jump =

The men's long jump event at the 1999 European Athletics U23 Championships was held in Gothenburg, Sweden, at Ullevi on 1 August 1999.

== Medalists ==
Gold	Yago Lamela; Spain
Silver	Vitaliy Shkurlatov; Russia
Bronze	Nathan Morgan; Great Britain

== Results ==
=== Final ===
1 August

Rank	Name	Nationality	Attempts						Result	Notes
Rank	Name	Nationality	1	2	3	4	5	6	Result	Notes
1st place, gold medalist(s)	Yago Lamela	Spain	x	x	8.01 (w: 0.3 m/s)	8.13 (w: 0.3 m/s)	8.36 (w: 0.7 m/s)	8.33 (w: 1.8 m/s)	8.36 (w: 0.7 m/s)	CR
2nd place, silver medalist(s)	Vitaliy Shkurlatov	Russia	8.02 (w: 1.7 m/s)	7.81 (w: 0.8 m/s)	7.90 (w: 1.5 m/s)	7.68 (w: 0.8 m/s)	x	x	8.02 (w: 1.7 m/s)	
3rd place, bronze medalist(s)	Nathan Morgan	Great Britain	x	7.69 w (w: 2.6 m/s)	x	x	7.99 (w: 1.8 m/s)	7.93 (w: 1.6 m/s)	7.99 (w: 1.8 m/s)	
4	Grzegorz Marciniszyn	Poland	7.67 (w: 0.9 m/s)	7.79 (w: 1.0 m/s)	7.87 (w: 1.2 m/s)	7.75 (w: 2.0 m/s)	7.97 (w: 1.3 m/s)	7.91 (w: 1.8 m/s)	7.97 (w: 1.3 m/s)	
5	Ranko Leskovar	Slovenia	x	x	7.81 (w: -0.4 m/s)	7.71 (w: 2.0 m/s)	x	7.90 (w: 0.5 m/s)	7.90 (w: 0.5 m/s)	
6	Niklas Rorarius	Finland	x	7.65 (w: 0.4 m/s)	7.84 (w: 1.1 m/s)	x	x	7.58 (w: 1.5 m/s)	7.84 (w: 1.1 m/s)	
7	Danila Burkenya	Russia	7.81 (w: 1.1 m/s)	7.74 (w: 0.6 m/s)	4.48 (w: 0.2 m/s)	7.55 (w: 0.6 m/s)	x	x	7.81 (w: 1.1 m/s)	
8	Yann Domenech	France	x	x	7.68 (w: 0.4 m/s)	x	7.72 (w: 0.0 m/s)	x	7.72 (w: 0.0 m/s)	
9	Vasil Gergov	Bulgaria	7.43 (w: 2.0 m/s)	7.61 (w: 2.0 m/s)	7.38 (w: -0.5 m/s)				7.61 (w: 2.0 m/s)	
10	Danial Jahić	Yugoslavia	7.59 (w: 0.7 m/s)	7.59 w (w: 2.5 m/s)	7.60 (w: 1.3 m/s)				7.60 (w: 1.3 m/s)	
11	Christos Kiritsis	Greece	x	7.55 (w: 0.3 m/s)	x				7.55 (w: 0.3 m/s)	
12	Francesco Agresti	Italy	7.50 (w: 1.1 m/s)	x	x				7.50 (w: 1.1 m/s)	
13	Renos Kolokotronis	Cyprus	7.40 (w: 1.8 m/s)	7.10 (w: 0.3 m/s)	x				7.40 (w: 1.8 m/s)	
14	Antonio Adsuar	Spain	x	7.15 (w: 0.2 m/s)	7.11 w (w: 2.8 m/s)				7.15 (w: 0.2 m/s)	

== Participation ==
According to an unofficial count, 14 athletes from 12 countries participated in the event.

- Bulgaria (1)
- Cyprus (1)
- Finland (1)
- France (1)
- Great Britain (1)
- Greece (1)
- Italy (1)
- Poland (1)
- Russia (2)
- Slovenia (1)
- Spain (2)
- Yugoslavia (1)
