= 1998 World Junior Championships in Athletics – Men's long jump =

The men's long jump event at the 1998 World Junior Championships in Athletics was held in Annecy, France, at Parc des Sports on 29 and 30 July.

== Medalists ==
Gold	Petar Dachev; Bulgaria
Silver	Abdul Rahman Al-Nubi; Qatar
Bronze	Luis Felipe Méliz; Cuba

== Results ==
=== Final ===
30 July

Rank	Name	Nationality	Attempts						Result	Notes
Rank	Name	Nationality	1	2	3	4	5	6	Result	Notes
1st place, gold medalist(s)	Petar Dachev	Bulgaria	8.11 (w: +0.9 m/s)	8.11 (w: +0.7 m/s)	x	7.69 (w: 0.0 m/s)	8.14 (w: +0.3 m/s)	x	8.14 (w: +0.3 m/s)	
2nd place, silver medalist(s)	Abdul Rahman Al-Nubi	Qatar	7.83 (w: -1.5 m/s)	8.11 (w: -0.1 m/s)	7.90 (w: -1.0 m/s)	7.93 w (w: +2.1 m/s)	x	7.86 (w: +1.2 m/s)	8.11 (w: -0.1 m/s)	
3rd place, bronze medalist(s)	Luis Felipe Méliz	Cuba	7.59 (w: +0.4 m/s)	7.91 (w: +0.6 m/s)	x	7.59 (w: +1.1 m/s)	7.62 (w: -0.8 m/s)	x	7.91 (w: +0.6 m/s)	
4	Krasimir Argirov	Bulgaria	7.79 (w: +0.4 m/s)	7.87 w (w: +2.7 m/s)	7.72 (w: +1.4 m/s)	6.62 (w: +0.6 m/s)	7.60 (w: +0.6 m/s)	7.39 (w: +0.3 m/s)	7.87 w (w: +2.7 m/s)	
5	Danial Jahic	Yugoslavia	7.71 (w: +0.2 m/s)	x	x	7.83 (w: +0.1 m/s)	7.71 (w: +0.2 m/s)	x	7.83 (w: +0.1 m/s)	
6	Wang Cheng	China	7.69 (w: -0.3 m/s)	7.75 (w: -3.0 m/s)	7.70 (w: +0.8 m/s)	x	x	x	7.75 (w: -3.0 m/s)	
7	Schahriar Bigdeli	Germany	7.37 (w: -1.2 m/s)	7.65 (w: -0.2 m/s)	7.60 (w: -0.2 m/s)	7.71 (w: -0.8 m/s)	7.63 (w: -0.1 m/s)	x	7.71 (w: -0.8 m/s)	
8	Vitaliy Shkurlatov	Russia	7.22 (w: +0.3 m/s)	7.57 (w: +0.6 m/s)	x	7.41 (w: -0.9 m/s)	7.61 (w: +0.8 m/s)	7.52 (w: -0.5 m/s)	7.61 (w: +0.8 m/s)	
9	Chris Hercules	United States	7.48 (w: +1.8 m/s)	x	7.44 (w: -0.1 m/s)				7.48 (w: +1.8 m/s)	
10	Tommi Evilä	Finland	x	7.39 (w: +0.4 m/s)	x				7.39 (w: +0.4 m/s)	
11	Yann Doménech	France	x	7.11 (w: +0.4 m/s)	x				7.11 (w: +0.4 m/s)	
	Chris Stafford	United States	x	x	x				NM	

=== Qualifications ===
29 Jul

==== Group A ====
Rank	Name	Nationality	Attempts			Result	Notes
Rank	Name	Nationality	1	2	3	Result	Notes
1	Petar Dachev	Bulgaria	7.98 (w: +0.4 m/s)	-	-	7.98 (w: +0.4 m/s)	Q
2	Schahriar Bigdeli	Germany	7.88 w (w: +2.5 m/s)	-	-	7.88 w (w: +2.5 m/s)	Q
3	Abdul Rahman Al-Nubi	Qatar	7.86 (w: +1.0 m/s)	-	-	7.86 (w: +1.0 m/s)	Q
4	Wang Cheng	China	x	x	7.81 (w: +0.5 m/s)	7.81 (w: +0.5 m/s)	Q
5	Danial Jahic	Yugoslavia	7.35 (w: -1.5 m/s)	x	7.69 (w: +1.7 m/s)	7.69 (w: +1.7 m/s)	q
6	Vitaliy Shkurlatov	Russia	7.57 (w: -0.1 m/s)	7.47 (w: +0.3 m/s)	7.46 (w: -1.1 m/s)	7.57 (w: -0.1 m/s)	q
7	Chris Hercules	United States	7.29 (w: -0.8 m/s)	x	7.56 (w: +0.4 m/s)	7.56 (w: +0.4 m/s)	q
8	Janne Harju	Finland	7.46 (w: +0.3 m/s)	7.30 (w: +1.0 m/s)	7.39 (w: +0.4 m/s)	7.46 (w: +0.3 m/s)	
9	Leslie Djhone	France	7.46 (w: -0.3 m/s)	x	x	7.46 (w: -0.3 m/s)	
10	Masashi Watanabe	Japan	7.45 (w: +0.7 m/s)	x	7.38 (w: +0.2 m/s)	7.45 (w: +0.7 m/s)	
11	Ferdinando Iucolane	Italy	7.35 (w: +1.1 m/s)	x	x	7.35 (w: +1.1 m/s)	
12	DeWayne Barrett	Jamaica	x	x	7.26 (w: -0.1 m/s)	7.26 (w: -0.1 m/s)	
13	Santiago Sánchez	Spain	x	7.25 (w: +0.2 m/s)	7.08 (w: +0.3 m/s)	7.25 (w: +0.2 m/s)	
14	Tomasz Mateusiak	Poland	7.06 (w: +0.3 m/s)	7.19 (w: +0.4 m/s)	6.92 (w: +0.9 m/s)	7.19 (w: +0.4 m/s)	
15	Sanjay Kumar Rai	India	6.85 (w: -1.0 m/s)	6.98 (w: 0.0 m/s)	x	6.98 (w: 0.0 m/s)	
16	Huang Chia-Yung	Chinese Taipei	6.82 (w: -1.2 m/s)	x	x	6.82 (w: -1.2 m/s)	
17	Darren Thompson	United Kingdom	6.50 (w: +0.6 m/s)	x	x	6.50 (w: +0.6 m/s)	

==== Group B ====
Rank	Name	Nationality	Attempts			Result	Notes
Rank	Name	Nationality	1	2	3	Result	Notes
1	Luis Felipe Méliz	Cuba	7.49 (w: -0.3 m/s)	7.67 (w: +1.0 m/s)	7.59 w (w: +2.6 m/s)	7.67 (w: +1.0 m/s)	q
2	Yann Doménech	France	x	7.19 (w: +1.2 m/s)	7.59 w (w: +2.2 m/s)	7.59 w (w: +2.2 m/s)	q
3	Krasimir Argirov	Bulgaria	7.32 (w: +0.9 m/s)	7.04 (w: +1.5 m/s)	7.57 (w: +1.6 m/s)	7.57 (w: +1.6 m/s)	q
4	Tommi Evilä	Finland	x	7.04 (w: -2.0 m/s)	7.51 w (w: +3.4 m/s)	7.51 w (w: +3.4 m/s)	q
5	Chris Stafford	United States	7.49 (w: -0.1 m/s)	x	6.99 (w: +0.6 m/s)	7.49 (w: -0.1 m/s)	q
6	Andrzej Masiak	Poland	x	7.48 (w: -1.0 m/s)	7.41 (w: +0.7 m/s)	7.48 (w: -1.0 m/s)	
7	Esteban Copland	Venezuela	x	7.33 (w: +0.8 m/s)	7.41 (w: -1.0 m/s)	7.41 (w: -1.0 m/s)	
8	Zhou Can	China	7.00 (w: -1.2 m/s)	7.39 (w: +1.9 m/s)	6.99 (w: +0.5 m/s)	7.39 (w: +1.9 m/s)	
9	Idika Uduma	Nigeria	x	7.07 (w: -0.4 m/s)	7.36 (w: -0.7 m/s)	7.36 (w: -0.7 m/s)	
10	Chiu Chin-Ching	Chinese Taipei	7.34 (w: +0.4 m/s)	x	6.26 (w: -0.2 m/s)	7.34 (w: +0.4 m/s)	
11	Aundre Edwards	Jamaica	7.30 (w: +0.6 m/s)	7.17 (w: +0.9 m/s)	7.13 (w: +0.3 m/s)	7.30 (w: +0.6 m/s)	
12	Shinichi Terano	Japan	x	x	7.25 (w: -0.8 m/s)	7.25 (w: -0.8 m/s)	
13	Sergey Pavlov	Russia	7.13 (w: -1.1 m/s)	6.89 (w: -1.1 m/s)	x	7.13 (w: -1.1 m/s)	
14	Vahagn Javakhyan	Armenia	x	6.98 (w: +0.4 m/s)	x	6.98 (w: +0.4 m/s)	
15	Jerome Abraham	Germany	x	x	6.95 (w: -0.4 m/s)	6.95 (w: -0.4 m/s)	
	Alejandro Olivan	Spain	x	x	x	NM	
	Boštjan Fridrih	Slovenia	x	x	x	NM	

== Participation ==
According to an unofficial count, 34 athletes from 22 countries participated in the event.

- Armenia (1)
- Bulgaria (2)
- China (2)
- Chinese Taipei (2)
- Cuba (1)
- Finland (2)
- France (2)
- Germany (2)
- India (1)
- Italy (1)
- Jamaica (2)
- Japan (2)
- Nigeria (1)
- Poland (2)
- Qatar (1)
- Russia (2)
- Slovenia (1)
- Spain (2)
- United Kingdom (1)
- United States (2)
- Venezuela (1)
- Yugoslavia (1)
