= Loïc Lerouge =

French sprinter (born 1977)

Personal information
- Born: 21 January 1977 (age 49) Nantes, France

Sport
- Country: France
- Sport: Sport of athletics
- Event: 400 metres

Achievements and titles
- National finals: 1998 French U23s; • 400m, 2nd (silver); 2002 French Indoors; • 400m, 3rd (bronze)
- Personal bests: 200m: 21.96 sh (1999); 400m: 46.60 (1998); 800m: 1:53.97 sh (2003)
Medal record
Men's athletics
Representing France
World Indoor Championships
Bronze medal – third place	1997 Paris	4 × 400 m relay
European Indoor Championships
Silver medal – second place	2002 Vienna	4 × 400 m relay
European U20 Championships
Silver medal – second place	1995 Nyíregyháza	4 × 400 m relay
- Updated on November 2024

Loïc Lerouge (born 21 January 1977) is a French former sprinter specializing in the 400 metres and the 4th World Athletics Indoor Championships bronze medallist in the 4 × 400 m relay. Lerouge won the relay silver medal at the 1995 European Athletics Junior Championships before winning bronze at the 1997 World Indoor Championships 4 × 400 m. In 2002, Lerouge won his first European medal at the 2002 European Indoor Championships relay before coming a research director focusing on sport at the French National Centre for Scientific Research.

== Career ==
Lerouge won his first international medal at the 1995 European Athletics Junior Championships, where he contributed to the French team's runner-up performance in the 4 × 400 m by virtue of running in the heats. He ran the 3rd leg to win his heat and was replaced by Ruddy Zami in the finals.

Lerouge achieved his highest international success at the 1997 IAAF World Indoor Championships, where he ran the 3rd leg on the 4 × 400 m relay. Despite his team being the slowest of 6 qualifiers into the finals with a 3:09.50 seed, a similar 3:09.68 performance in the finals was enough for the French team to win the bronze medal, behind only the United States and Jamaica.

At the 1999 European Athletics U23 Championships, Lerouge competed in both the individual 400 m and relay. Though he was the first athlete not to qualify for the semifinals from his 400 m heat, Lerouge was able to qualify the French 4 × 400 m team to the finals where they finished 4th.

Lerouge placed 3rd in the 400 m individually at the 2002 French Indoor Championships, qualifying him to represent France in the relay at the 2002 European Athletics Indoor Championships in Vienna. Lerouge again ran the 3rd leg on the French relay team, winning the silver medal in the 4 × 400 m final. Their time of 3:06.42 was only beaten by a championship record 3:05.50 clocking from Poland.

== Personal life ==
Lerouge was born 21 January 1977 in Nantes, France. After his athletics career, Lerouge became a research director at the French National Centre for Scientific Research focusing on occupational health laws. He wrote a paper about the peculiarities of the legal regime of professional sport in France that has been cited in overviews of Portuguese sport law. He retired from professional sprinting in 2004.

== Statistics ==
=== Personal best progression ===
400m progression
#	Mark	Pl.	Competition	Venue	Date	Ref.
1	47.36			Narbonne, France	31 May 1997	
2	46.60	2nd place, silver medalist(s)	French U23 Athletics Championships	Dreux, France	10 Jul 1998	
