= Iván Pedroso =

Cuban long jumper

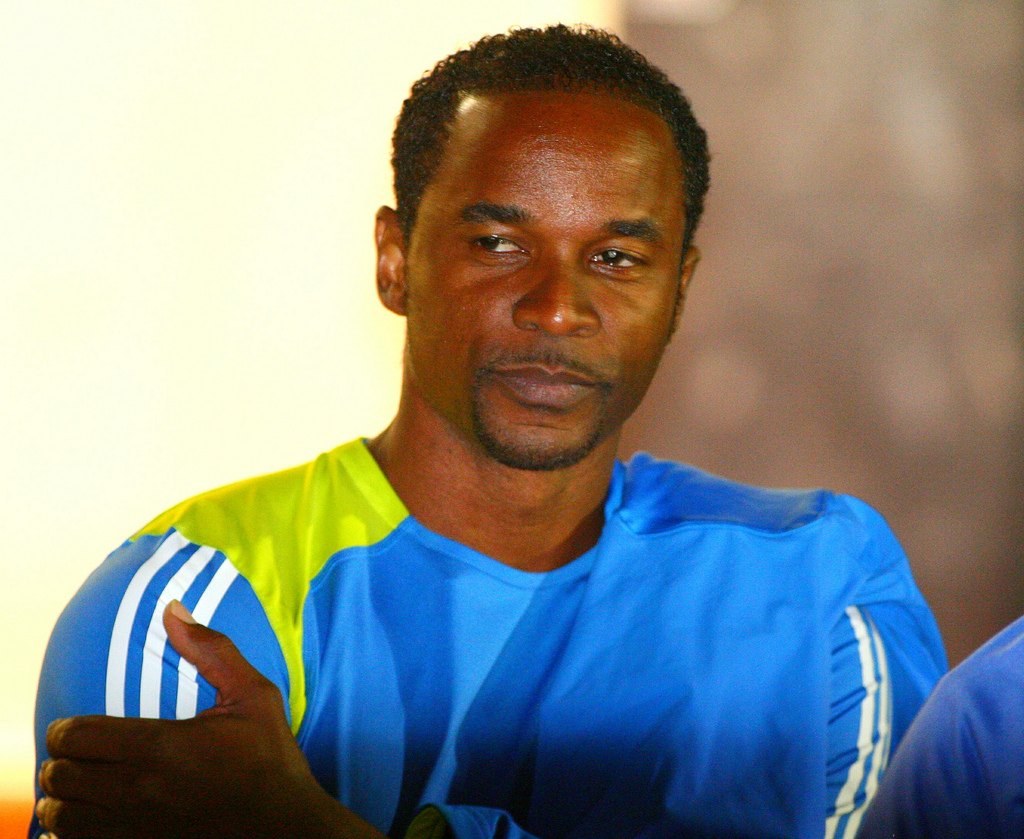
- Pedroso

Personal information
- Full name: Iván Lázaro Pedroso Soler
- Born: 17 December 1972 (age 53) Havana, Cuba
- Height: 1.76 m (5 ft 9 in)
- Weight: 66 kg (146 lb)

Sport
- Country: Cuba
- Sport: Athletics
- Event: Long jump
- Retired: 2007

Achievements and titles
- Personal best: 8.71 m (Salamanca, 1995) NR
Medal record
Representing Cuba
Olympic Games
Gold medal – first place	2000 Sydney	Long jump
World Championships
Gold medal – first place	1995 Gothenburg	Long jump
Gold medal – first place	1997 Athens	Long jump
Gold medal – first place	1999 Sevilla	Long jump
Gold medal – first place	2001 Edmonton	Long jump
World Indoor Championships
Gold medal – first place	1993 Toronto	Long jump
Gold medal – first place	1995 Barcelona	Long jump
Gold medal – first place	1997 Paris	Long jump
Gold medal – first place	1999 Maebashi	Long jump
Gold medal – first place	2001 Lisbon	Long jump
Pan American Games
Gold medal – first place	1995 Mar del Plata	Long jump
Gold medal – first place	1999 Winnipeg	Long jump
Gold medal – first place	2003 Santo Domingo	Long jump
Bronze medal – third place	1991 Havana	Long jump
Central American and Caribbean Games
Gold medal – first place	1998 Maracaibo	Long jump
Silver medal – second place	2006 Cartagena	Long jump
Summer Universiade
Gold medal – first place	1997 Catania	Long jump

Iván Lázaro Pedroso Soler (Spanish pronunciation: [iˈβam peˈðɾoso]; born 17 December 1972) is a retired Cuban athlete, who specialized in the long jump, and is the current coach of Yulimar Rojas and Jordan Díaz.

== Career ==
Pedroso was born in Havana, Cuba. In July 1990, aged just 17, Pedroso jumped more than 8 metres for the first time. Facing tough competition from Carl Lewis, Mike Powell and others, he still won numerous gold medals in international competitions in the early nineties. He almost never finished in less than first place. When Powell and Lewis retired, Pedroso became the dominant athlete, winning numerous indoor and outdoor World Championships. In fact he won all major championships from 1997 to 2001, including an Olympic gold medal in Sydney.

On 29 July 1995, Iván Pedroso jumped 8.96 metres at high altitude in Sestriere. The wind reading was +1.2 metres per second, therefore the jump would have been eligible for records and top lists, beating Mike Powell's existing world record by one centimetre. However, the Italian Athletics Federation did not forward the result to the IAAF for ratification, since the wind reading was declared invalid, because a person stood in front of the anemometer, probably intercepting the correct wind measurement.

Despite his great success in the World Championships, due to injuries, he did not make a great impact on the Olympic Games like former rival Carl Lewis. He did finish fourth at the age of 19 in Barcelona 1992, but in Atlanta 1996 he had injury troubles and could only finish 12th in the final. At the 2000 Olympics in Sydney, Pedroso spectacularly won the gold medal with his final attempt. In a tough contest in Athens 2004, he finished 7th. Pedroso has not entered in any major championships since, although he still had several jumps over 8 metres.

On 26 September 2007, Pedroso announced his retirement.

His official personal best is 8.71 metres, which he jumped in Salamanca in 1995. The mark still stands as the Cuban record.

He is the former coach of 2008 triple jump Olympic champion Nelson Évora and 2013 world champion Teddy Tamgho. As of 2026, he is the coach of 2020 Olympic champion Yulimar Rojas and 2024 Olympic champion Jordan Díaz. Pedroso is a cousin of the hurdler Aliuska López.

== Achievements ==
Year	Competition	Venue	Position	Notes
Representing Cuba
1990	Central American and Caribbean Junior Championships (U-20)	Havana, Cuba	2nd	7.74 m (+0.3 m/s)
1990	World Junior Championships	Plovdiv, Bulgaria	4th	7.81 m (-0.2 m/s)
1991	Pan American Junior Championships	Kingston, Jamaica	1st	8.08 m
1991	Pan American Games	Havana, Cuba	3rd	7.96 m
1992	Ibero-American Championships	Seville, Spain	1st	8.53 m CR (+1.6 m/s)
1992	Olympic Games	Barcelona, Spain	4th	8.11 m (-0.8 m/s)
1992	World Cup	Havana, Cuba	1st	7.97 m
1993	World Indoor Championships	Toronto, Canada	1st	8.23 m
1993	World Championships	Stuttgart, Germany	NM	—
1995	World Indoor Championships	Barcelona, Spain	1st	8.51 m CR
1995	World Championships	Gothenburg, Sweden	1st	8.70 m (+1.6 m/s)
1995	Pan American Games	Mar del Plata, Argentina	1st	8.50 m
1995	IAAF Grand Prix Final	Monte Carlo, Monaco	1st	8.49 m
1996	Olympic Games	Atlanta, United States	12th	7.75 m
1997	World Indoor Championships	Paris, France	1st	8.51 m CR
1997	Central American and Caribbean Championships	San Juan, Puerto Rico	1st	8.54 m w
1997	World Championships	Athens, Greece	1st	8.42 m (+0.1 m/s)
1997	Universiade	Catania, Italy	1st	8.40 m GR
1997	IAAF Grand Prix Final	Fukuoka, Japan	1st	8.53 m
1998	Goodwill Games	Uniondale, United States	1st	8.54 m
1998	Central American and Caribbean Games	Maracaibo, Venezuela	1st	8.45 m CR
1998	World Cup	Johannesburg, South Africa	1st	8.37 m
1999	World Indoor Championships	Maebashi, Japan	1st	8.62 m CR
1999	World Championships	Seville, Spain	1st	8.56 m (+1.1 m/s)
1999	Pan American Games	Winnipeg, Canada	1st	8.52 m
1999	IAAF Grand Prix Final	Munich, Germany	1st	8.43 m
2000	Summer Olympics	Sydney, Australia	1st	8.55 m (+0.4 m/s)
2001	World Indoor Championships	Lisbon, Portugal	1st	8.43 m
2001	World Championships	Edmonton, Canada	1st	8.55 m (+1.2 m/s)
2001	Goodwill Games	Brisbane, Australia	1st	8.16 m
2002	World Cup	Madrid, Spain	2nd	8.19 m (+0.6 m/s)
2003	Pan American Games	Santo Domingo, Dominican Republic	1st	8.23 m
2003	World Championships	Paris, France	NM (q)	—
2004	World Indoor Championships	Budapest, Hungary	8th	8.09 m
2004	Ibero-American Championships	Huelva, Spain	3rd	7.78 m
2004	Olympic Games	Athens, Greece	7th	8.23 m (+0.7 m/s)
2006	Central American and Caribbean Games	Cartagena, Colombia	2nd	7.92 m
2007	Pan American Games	Rio de Janeiro, Brazil	4th	7.86 m

Sporting positions
Preceded by Erick Walder; Erick Walder; James Beckford	Men's long jump season's best 1995; 1997; 1999–2001	Succeeded by Erick Walder; James Beckford; Miguel Pate
Olympic Games
Preceded by Félix Savón	Flagbearer for Cuba; Athens 2004	Succeeded by Mijaín López
