= Jason Rouser =

American sprinter

Personal information
- Born: March 22, 1970 (age 56) Tucson, Arizona, U.S.
Medal record
Men's athletics
Representing the United States
Olympic Games
Gold medal – first place	1996 Atlanta	4 × 400 m relay
World Indoor Championships
Gold medal – first place	1993 Toronto	4 × 400 m relay
Gold medal – first place	1997 Paris	4 × 400 m relay

Jason Rouser (born March 22, 1970, in Tucson, Arizona) is a retired American sprinter who specialized in the 400 metres.

At the 1993 World Indoor Championships he finished sixth in the 400 metres and won a gold medal in 4 × 400 metres relay. He won another relay gold medal at the 1997 World Indoor Championships.

At the 1996 Olympic Games he ran the 2nd leg for the American relay team that won a gold medal.
