= Grzegorz Marciniszyn =

Polish long jumper (born 1977)

Grzegorz Marciniszyn (born 22 May 1977) is a retired Polish long jumper.

He finished ninth at the 2001 World Championships. He also competed in the 1997 World Championships, the 1998 European Championships. the 2000 European Indoor Championships, and the 2002 European Indoor Championships without reaching the final. He became Polish champion in 1998, 2000 and 2001, and Polish indoor champion in 1999, 2000, 2001, 2002 and 2003.

His personal best jump was 8.28 metres, achieved in July 2001 in Mals. This is the Polish record.

== Competition record ==
Year	Competition	Venue	Position	Notes
Representing Poland
1995	European Junior Championships	Nyíregyháza, Hungary	16th (q)	7.27 m
1996	World Junior Championships	Sydney, Australia	14th (q)	7.43 m w (wind: +3.2 m/s)
1997	European U23 Championships	Turku, Finland	9th	7.51 m (wind: +0.4 m/s)
1997	World Championships	Athens, Greece	23rd (q)	7.69 m
1998	European Championships	Budapest, Hungary	30th (q)	7.56 m
1999	European U23 Championships	Gothenburg, Sweden	4th	7.97 m (wind: +1.3 m/s)
2000	European Indoor Championships	Ghent, Belgium	10th (q)	7.81 m
2001	World Championships	Edmonton, Canada	9th	7.92 m
2002	European Indoor Championships	Vienna, Austria	10th (q)	7.87 m
