= 1999 IAAF World Indoor Championships =

7th IAAF World Indoor Championships
- Dates: 5 March–7 March
- Host city: Maebashi, Japan
- Venue: Green Dome Maebashi
- Events: 28
- Participation: 451 athletes from 115 nations

The 7th IAAF World Indoor Championships in Athletics were held in the Green Dome Maebashi stadium in Maebashi, Japan from March 5 to March 7, 1999. It was the first time the Championships were staged outside Europe or North America. Primo Nebiolo, president of the IAAF, characterized the championships as "the greatest ever". There were a total number of 487 participating athletes from 115 countries.

== Doping disqualifications ==
Four medalists were disqualified for doping; Rostislav Dimitrov of Bulgaria was stripped of the triple jump silver, Inger Miller of the USA was stripped of the 60 metre bronze, Vita Pavlysh of Ukraine was stripped of the shot put gold and Irina Korzhanenko of Russia was stripped of the shot put silver.

== Results ==
=== Men ===
Event	Gold		Silver		Bronze	
60 m	Maurice Greene; United States	6.42 (CR)	Tim Harden; United States	6.43 (PB)	Jason Gardener; Great Britain	6.46 (AR)
200 m	Frankie Fredericks; Namibia	20.10 (CR)	Obadele Thompson; Barbados	20.26 (AR)	Kevin Little; United States	20.48
400 m	Jamie Baulch; Great Britain	45.73	Milton Campbell; United States	45.99	Alejandro Cárdenas; Mexico	46.02 (NR)
800 m	Johan Botha; South Africa	1:45.47	Wilson Kipketer; Denmark	1:45.49	Nico Motchebon; Germany	1:45.74
1500 m	Haile Gebrselassie; Ethiopia	3:33.77 (CR)	Laban Rotich; Kenya	3:33.98	Andrés Manuel Díaz; Spain	3:34.46
3000 m	Haile Gebrselassie; Ethiopia	7:53.57	Paul Bitok; Kenya	7:53.79	Million Wolde; Ethiopia	7:53.85
60 m hurdles	Colin Jackson; Great Britain	7.38 (CR)	Reggie Torian; United States	7.40	Falk Balzer; Germany	7.44
4 × 400 m relay	United States (USA); Andre Morris; Dameon Johnson; Deon Minor; Milton Campbell	3:02.83 (WR)	Poland (POL); Piotr Haczek; Jacek Bocian; Piotr Rysiukiewicz; Robert Maćkowiak	3:03.01 (AR)	Great Britain (GBR); Allyn Condon; Solomon Wariso; Adrian Patrick; Jamie Baulch	3:03.20 (NR)
High jump	Javier Sotomayor; Cuba	2.36	Vyacheslav Voronin; Russia	2.36	Charles Austin; United States	2.33
Pole vault	Jean Galfione; France	6.00 (CR)	Jeff Hartwig; United States	5.95 (AR)	Danny Ecker; Germany	5.85
Long jump	Iván Pedroso; Cuba	8.62 (CR)	Yago Lamela; Spain	8.56 (AR)	Erick Walder; United States	8.30
Triple jump	Charles Friedek; Germany	17.18 (PB)	LaMark Carter; United States^{1}	16.98	Zsolt Czingler; Hungary	16.98
Shot put	Aleksandr Bagach; Ukraine	21.41	John Godina; United States	21.06	Yuriy Bilonog; Ukraine	20.89
Heptathlon	Sebastian Chmara; Poland	6386 (WL)	Erki Nool; Estonia	6374 (NR)	Roman Šebrle; Czech Republic	6319 (NR)

^{1} Rostislav Dimitrov of Bulgaria originally won the silver medal, but was disqualified for doping.

=== Women ===
Event	Gold		Silver		Bronze	
60 m *	Ekaterini Thanou; Greece	6.96	Gail Devers; United States	7.02	Philomena Mensah; Canada	7.07
200 m	Ionela Târlea; Romania	22.39	Svetlana Goncharenko; Russia	22.69	Pauline Davis; Bahamas	22.70
400 m	Grit Breuer; Germany	50.80	Falilat Ogunkoya; Nigeria	51.25	Jearl Miles Clark; United States	51.45
800 m	Ludmila Formanová; Czech Republic	1:56.90 (CR)	Maria Mutola; Mozambique	1:57.17	Natalya Tsyganova; Russia	1:57.47 (NR)
1500 m	Gabriela Szabo; Romania	4:03.23 (CR)	Violeta Beclea; Romania	4:03.53 (PB)	Lidia Chojecka; Poland	4:05.86 (NR)
3000 m	Gabriela Szabo; Romania	8:36.42	Zahra Ouaziz; Morocco	8:38.43 (AR)	Regina Jacobs; United States	8:39.14 (AR)
60 m hurdles	Olga Shishigina; Kazakhstan	7.86	Glory Alozie; Nigeria	7.87	Keturah Anderson; Canada	7.90
4 × 400 m relay	Russia (RUS); Tatyana Chebykina; Svetlana Goncharenko; Olga Kotlyarova; Natalya Nazarova	3:24.25 (WR)	Australia (AUS); Susan Andrews; Tania Van Heer; Tamsyn Lewis; Cathy Freeman	3:26.87 (AR)	United States (USA); Monique Hennagan; Michelle Collins; Zundra Feagin; Shanelle Porter	3:27.59 (AR)
High jump	Khristina Kalcheva; Bulgaria	1.99	Zuzana Hlavoňová; Czech Republic	1.96	Tisha Waller; United States	1.96
Pole vault	Nastja Ryjikh; Germany	4.50 (CR)	Vala Flosadóttir; Iceland	4.45 (NR)	Nicole Rieger; Germany	4.35
Pole vault	Nastja Ryjikh; Germany	4.50 (CR)	Vala Flosadóttir; Iceland	4.45 (NR)	Zsuzsanna Szabó; Hungary	4.35
Long jump	Tatyana Kotova; Russia	6.86 (PB)	Shana Williams; United States	6.82 (PB)	Iva Prandzheva; Bulgaria	6.78
Triple jump	Ashia Hansen; Great Britain	15.02 (WL)	Iva Prandzheva; Bulgaria	14.94 (NR)	Šárka Kašpárková; Czech Republic	14.87 (NR)
Shot put *	Svetlana Krivelyova; Russia	19.08	Krystyna Danilczyk; Poland	19.00	Teri Steer; United States	18.86
Pentathlon	Le Shundra Nathan; United States	4753	Irina Belova; Russia	4691	Urszula Włodarczyk; Poland	4596

- American sprinter Inger Miller won the bronze but failed a post-race drug test (excessive caffeine) and was stripped of the medal.
- Vita Pavlysh of Ukraine failed a drug test and was stripped of her shot put gold medal.
- Irina Korzhanenko of Russia was stripped of the shot put silver.

== Medal table ==
Rank	Nation	Gold	Silver	Bronze	Total
1	United States (USA)	3	8	8	19
2	Russia (RUS)	3	3	1	7
3	Romania (ROM)	3	1	0	4
4	Germany (GER)	3	0	4	7
5	Great Britain (GBR)	3	0	2	5
6	Ethiopia (ETH)	2	0	1	3
7	Cuba (CUB)	2	0	0	2
8	Poland (POL)	1	2	2	5
9	Czech Republic (CZE)	1	1	2	4
10	Bulgaria (BGR)	1	1	1	3
11	Ukraine (UKR)	1	0	1	2
12	France (FRA)	1	0	0	1
12	Greece	1	0	0	1
12	Kazakhstan (KAZ)	1	0	0	1
12	Namibia (NAM)	1	0	0	1
12	South Africa (RSA)	1	0	0	1
17	Kenya (KEN)	0	2	0	2
17	Nigeria (NGA)	0	2	0	2
19	Spain (ESP)	0	1	1	2
20	Australia (AUS)	0	1	0	1
20	Barbados (BRB)	0	1	0	1
20	Denmark (DEN)	0	1	0	1
20	Estonia (EST)	0	1	0	1
20	Iceland (ISL)	0	1	0	1
20	Morocco (MAR)	0	1	0	1
20	Mozambique (MOZ)	0	1	0	1
27	Canada (CAN)	0	0	2	2
27	Hungary (HUN)	0	0	2	2
29	Bahamas (BAH)	0	0	1	1
29	Mexico (MEX)	0	0	1	1
Totals (30 entries)		28	28	29	85

== Participating nations ==
- Algeria (4)
- Andorra (1)
- Anguilla (1)
- Antigua and Barbuda (1)
- Argentina (1)
- Armenia (1)
- Australia (12)
- Austria (6)
- Bahamas (5)
- Bahrain (1)
- Barbados (1)
- Belarus (2)
- Belgium (2)
- Benin (1)
- Bermuda (1)
- Bhutan (1)
- Bolivia (1)
- Bosnia and Herzegovina (1)
- Botswana (1)
- Brazil (1)
- Bulgaria (10)
- Burundi (2)
- Canada (4)
- Central African Republic (1)
- Chad (2)
- China (10)
- Chinese Taipei (1)
- Ivory Coast (1)
- Croatia (1)
- Cuba (9)
- Cyprus (1)
- Czech Republic (10)
- Democratic Republic of the Congo (1)
- Denmark (1)
- Dominica (1)
- Dominican Republic (1)
- Egypt (1)
- Equatorial Guinea (1)
- Eritrea (1)
- Estonia (1)
- Ethiopia (2)
- Finland (1)
- France (17)
- Gabon (1)
- Georgia (1)
- Germany (24)
- Ghana (1)
- Great Britain (24)
- Greece (8)
- Guatemala (1)
- Guinea (1)
- Guyana (1)
- Haiti (1)
- Hong Kong (1)
- Hungary (7)
- Iceland (3)
- Ireland (3)
- Israel (2)
- Italy (7)
- Jamaica (15)
- Japan (30)
- Kazakhstan (4)
- Kenya (5)
- Kyrgyzstan (1)
- Laos (1)
- Latvia (1)
- Lesotho (1)
- Liberia (1)
- Lithuania (2)
- Madagascar (1)
- Malawi (1)
- Malaysia (1)
- Maldives (1)
- Mauritius (1)
- Mexico (4)
- Montserrat (1)
- Morocco (3)
- Mozambique (2)
- Namibia (1)
- Netherlands (3)
- New Zealand (3)
- Nigeria (8)
- Oman (1)
- Papua New Guinea (1)
- Philippines (1)
- Poland (20)
- Portugal (1)
- Republic of the Congo (1)
- Romania (10)
- Russia (26)
- Rwanda (1)
- El Salvador (1)
- Sierra Leone (1)
- Singapore (1)
- Slovakia (2)
- Slovenia (8)
- Solomon Islands (1)
- South Africa (2)
- Spain (18)
- Suriname (1)
- Swaziland (1)
- Sweden (4)
- Switzerland (4)
- Tanzania (1)
- Togo (1)
- Trinidad and Tobago (1)
- Tunisia (1)
- Turkmenistan (1)
- Uganda (1)
- Ukraine (7)
- United States (46)
- Uzbekistan (1)
- Yugoslavia (1)
- Zambia (1)
- Zimbabwe (1)

== See also ==
- 1999 in athletics (track and field)
