= Kevin Dilworth =

American long jumper

Personal information
- Born: February 14, 1974 (age 52) Jacksonville, Texas, United States

Sport
- Sport: Track and field

Kevin Dilworth (born February 14, 1974) is an American retired track and field athlete who specialized in the long jump. He represented his country at the 1997 and 1999 World Championships.

== Competition record ==
Year	Competition	Venue	Position	Event	Notes
Representing the United States
1997	World Championships	Athens, Greece	8th	Long jump	7.88 m
1997	Universiade	Catania, Italy	5th	Long jump	7.92 m
1998	Goodwill Games	Uniondale, United States	5th	Long jump	8.13 m
1999	World Championships	Seville, Spain	7th	Long jump	8.00 m
2001	World Indoor Championships	Lisbon, Portugal	6th	Long jump	7.97 m
2001	Goodwill Games	Brisbane, Australia	4th	Long jump	7.97 m
2003	Pan American Games	Santo Domingo, Dominican Republic	6th	Long jump	7.86 m

== Personal bests ==
Outdoor

- 200 metres – 20.98 (1996)
- Long jump – 8.47 (+1.9 m/s) (Abilene 1996)

Indoor

- 55 metres – 6.35 (Lubbock 2001)
- Long jump – 8.20 (Joplin 2002)
