= Fred Mango =

French sprinter

Fred Mango (born 26 June 1973) is a retired French sprinter who specialized in the 400 metres.

He competed at the 1998 European Indoor Championships, the 1998 European Championships and the 1999 World Indoor Championships without reaching the final. He became French indoor champion in 1997 and 1999. Competitors included Pierre-Marie Hilaire, Bruno Wavelet and Marc Raquil.

In the 4 x 400 metres relay he won a bronze medal at the 1997 World Indoor Championships and a silver medal at the 1997 Mediterranean Games. The French team also finished sixth at the 1997 World Championships, did not start the final at the 1998 Athletics Championships, finished sixth at the 1999 World Indoor Championships and fifth at the 1999 World Championships.

His personal best time was 45.73 seconds, achieved in August 1999 in Niort.
