= Sean Maye =

American former sprinter (born 1970)

Sean Maye (born June 24, 1970) is an American former sprinter. He won a gold medal at the 1997 IAAF World Indoor Championships on the American 4 × 400 relay team.

Maye was educated at high school in Atlanta and Brigham Young University where he obtained a master's degree in System Management. While at Brigham Young University, he was a six Western Athletic Conference champion. In 1997, he finished fourth in the U.S. indoor championships and qualified for the U.S. team at the World Indoor Championships in Paris where he won a gold medal on the American 4 × 400 relay team.
