= Savanté Stringfellow =

American long jumper

Personal information
- Born: November 6, 1978 (age 47) Jackson, Mississippi, United States

Sport
- Sport: Track and field
Medal record
Representing the United States
Men's athletics
World Championships
Silver medal – second place	2001 Edmonton	Long jump
World Indoor Championships
Gold medal – first place	2004 Budapest	Long jump

Savanté Stringfellow (born November 6, 1978, in Jackson, Mississippi) is an American long jumper. A student at the University of Mississippi, he was selected for the United States 2000 Olympic team.
