= Petar Dachev =

Bulgarian long jumper

Medal record

Men's athletics

Representing Bulgaria

European Championships
Bronze medal – third place	1998 Budapest	Long jump

Petar Dachev (Bulgarian: Петър Дачев, born 15 June 1979, Troyan) is a retired Bulgarian long jumper, best known for his gold medal at the 2000 European Indoor Championships.

His personal best was 8.30 metres, achieved in June 2000 in Nicosia. This ranks him fourth among Bulgarian long jumpers, behind Ivaylo Mladenov, Atanas Atanasov and Nikolay Atanasov.

== Achievements ==
Year	Competition	Venue	Position	Notes
Representing Bulgaria
1998	European Championships	Budapest, Hungary	3rd	8.06 m
1998	World Junior Championships	Annecy, France	1st	8.14 m (wind: +0.3 m/s)
2000	European Indoor Championships	Ghent, Belgium	1st	8.26 m
2000	Olympic Games	Sydney, Australia	11th	7.80 m
2001	World Indoor Championships	Lisbon, Portugal	12th	7.45 m
2002	European Indoor Championships	Vienna, Austria	3rd	8.17 m
2003	World Indoor Championships	Birmingham, England	6th	7.79 m
