= Dameon Johnson =

American sprinter (born 1976)

Dameon Johnson (born October 29, 1976, in Baltimore) is an American former sprinter.
