= 2012 European Athletics Championships – Men's long jump =

Men's long jump at the European Athletics Championships

The men's long jump at the 2012 European Athletics Championships was held at the Helsinki Olympic Stadium on 29 June and 1 July.

== Medalists ==
Gold	Sebastian Bayer; Germany
Silver	Luis Méliz; Spain
Bronze	Michel Tornéus; Sweden

== Records ==
Standing records prior to the 2012 European Athletics Championships
World record	Mike Powell (USA)	8.95	Tokyo, Japan	30 August 1991
European record	Robert Emmiyan (URS)	8.86	Tsaghkadzor, Soviet Union	22 May 1987
Championship record	Christian Reif (GER)	8.47	Barcelona, Spain	1 August 2010
World Leading	Greg Rutherford (GBR)	8.35	Chula Vista, United States	3 May 2012
World Leading	Sergey Morgunov (RUS)	8.35	Cheboksary, Russia	20 June 2012
European Leading	Greg Rutherford (GBR)	8.35	Chula Vista, United States	3 May 2012
European Leading	Sergey Morgunov (RUS)	8.35	Cheboksary, Russia	20 June 2012

== Schedule ==
Date	Time	Round
29 June 2012	13:50	Qualification
1 July 2012	17:45	Final

== Results ==
=== Qualification ===
Qualification: Qualification Performance 8.05 (Q) or at least 12 best performers advance to the final

Rank	Group	Athlete	Nationality	#1	#2	#3	Result	Notes
1	A	Sebastian Bayer	Germany	8.34			8.34	Q
2	B	Michel Tornéus	Sweden	8.07			8.07	Q, =SB
3	A	Luis Méliz	Spain	7.80	8.06		8.06	Q, SB
4	A	Morten Jensen	Denmark	x	x	8.06	8.06	Q, SB
5	A	Jj Jegede	Great Britain	7.77	x	8.01	8.01	q, SB
6	A	Tommi Evilä	Finland	x	7.69	8.01	8.01	q, =SB
7	A	Roni Ollikainen	Finland	8.00	7.90	7.76	8.00	q
8	B	Marcos Chuva	Portugal	7.79	7.81	7.96	7.96	q, SB
9	A	Salim Sdiri	France	7.80	7.71	7.96	7.96	q
10	A	Tomasz Jaszczuk	Poland	7.80	7.94	x	7.94	q
11	B	Eusebio Cáceres	Spain	7.92	7.84	7.66	7.92	q
12	B	Kafétien Gomis	France	7.44	7.24	7.89	7.89	q
13	B	Chris Tomlinson	Great Britain	7.84	7.12	7.61	7.84	
14	B	Dimítrios Diamantáras	Greece	7.81	7.80	7.79	7.81	
15	B	Pavel Shalin	Russia	7.81	7.72	7.70	7.81	
16	A	Aleksandr Petrov	Russia	x	x	7.81	7.81	
17	B	Alyn Camara	Germany	7.80	7.79	x	7.80	
18	B	Štěpán Wagner	Czech Republic	7.80	7.72	7.75	7.80	
19	A	Roman Novotný	Czech Republic	7.80	x	x	7.80	
20	B	Alexandru Cuharenco	Moldova	7.79	7.68	7.75	7.79	SB
21	B	Julian Reid	Great Britain	7.37	7.73	7.40	7.73	SB
22	B	Nils Winter	Germany	x	7.71	7.61	7.71	
23	B	Mikko Kivinen	Finland	7.63	7.65	7.69	7.69	
24	A	Vardan Pahlevanyan	Armenia	x	7.44	7.67	7.67	
25	A	Yeóryios Tsákonas	Greece	7.64	7.62	7.63	7.64	
26	A	Frédéric Erin	France	7.35	7.53	6.75	7.53	
27	A	Rain Kask	Estonia	7.28	7.50	x	7.50	=PB
28	A	Kristinn Torfason	Iceland	7.49	7.41	7.44	7.49	
29	B	Arsen Sargsyan	Armenia	7.28	7.47	7.44	7.47	
30	B	Boleslav Skhirtladze	Georgia	x	x	7.23	7.23	
31	A	Dragoje Rajković	Montenegro	x	6.34	x	6.34	
32	B	Jānis Leitis	Latvia	x	x	5.88	5.88	
	A	Povilas Mykolaitis	Lithuania	x	–	–	NM	
	B	Nikolay Atanasov	Bulgaria	x	x	–	NM	
	B	Dino Pervan	Croatia	x	x	x	NM	
	A	Andreas Otterling	Sweden	x	x	x	NM	
	A	Marko Prugovečki	Croatia	x	x	x	NM	

=== Final ===
Rank	Athlete	Nationality	#1	#2	#3	#4	#5	#6	Result	Notes
1st place, gold medalist(s)	Sebastian Bayer	Germany	x	x	8.03	8.09	8.33	8.34	8.34	SB
2nd place, silver medalist(s)	Luis Méliz	Spain	7.97	8.21	8.05	7.87	x	7.60	8.21	SB
3rd place, bronze medalist(s)	Michel Tornéus	Sweden	8.17	x	8.14	x	x	–	8.17	SB
4	Jj Jegede	Great Britain	7.80	8.10	7.47	x	x	7.62	8.10	
5	Eusebio Cáceres	Spain	7.62	x	7.92	7.65	7.99	8.06	8.06	SB
6	Roni Ollikainen	Finland	x	8.05	7.88	7.67	7.74	x	8.05	=NUR
7	Marcos Chuva	Portugal	x	7.90	7.92	7.44	7.84	x	7.92	
8	Tomasz Jaszczuk	Poland	x	7.90	x	7.65	x	7.71	7.90	
9	Kafétien Gomis	France	7.66	x	7.88				7.88	
10	Tommi Evilä	Finland	x	7.79	x				7.79	
11	Morten Jensen	Denmark	x	7.56	x				7.56	
12	Salim Sdiri	France	7.48	x	x				7.48	
