= 2009 World Championships in Athletics – Men's long jump =

The men's long jump at the 2009 World Championships in Athletics was held at the Olympic Stadium on 20 and 22 August. The season had seen a number of athletes performing to a high level before the championships, with reigning World and Olympic champion Irving Saladino. The other athlete to jump that distance was Dwight Phillips, who is the world leader with a jump of 8.74 meters. Dwight Phillips took bronze in 2007 and is looking for his first win over Irving Saladino at an international level. Italy's Andrew Howe, the 2007 world silver medalist, withdrew from the Championships. Other expected to medal content are Olympic silver medalist Godfrey Khotso Mokoena and Olympic Bronze Medalist Ibrahim Camejo.

== Medalists ==
Gold	Dwight Phillips; United States (USA)
Silver	Godfrey Khotso Mokoena; South Africa (RSA)
Bronze	Mitchell Watt; Australia (AUS)

== Records ==
Prior to the competition, the following records were as follows.

World record	Mike Powell (USA)	8.95	Tokyo, Japan	30 August 1991
Championship record	Mike Powell (USA)	8.95	Tokyo, Japan	30 August 1991
World leading	Dwight Phillips (USA)	8.74	Eugene, United States	7 June 2009
African record	Godfrey Khotso Mokoena (RSA)	8.50	Madrid, Spain	4 July 2009
Asian Record	Mohamed Salman Al-Khuwalidi (KSA)	8.48	Sotteville, France	2 July 2006
North American record	Mike Powell (USA)	8.95	Tokyo, Japan	30 August 1991
South American record	Irving Saladino (PAN)	8.73	Hengelo, Netherlands	24 May 2008
European record	Robert Emmiyan (URS)	8.86	Tsaghkadzor, Soviet Union	22 May 1987
Oceanian record	Jai Taurima (AUS)	8.49	Sydney, Australia	28 September 2000

No new records was set during this competition.

== Qualification standards ==
A standard	B standard
8.15m	8.05m

== Schedule ==
Date	Time	Round
20 August 2009	18:10	Qualification
22 August 2009	18:05	Final

== Results ==
=== Qualification ===
Qualification: Qualifying Performance 8.15 (Q) or at least 12 best performers (q) advance to the final.

Rank	Group	Athlete	Nationality	#1	#2	#3	Result	Notes
1	A	Dwight Phillips	United States	8.44			8.44	Q
2	B	Greg Rutherford	Great Britain & N.I.	8.30			8.30	Q, NR
3	B	Godfrey Khotso Mokoena	South Africa	x	8.29		8.29	Q
4	B	Irving Saladino	Panama	8.00	8.16		8.16	Q
5	A	Mitchell Watt	Australia	8.14	x	-	8.14	q
6	B	Fabrice Lapierre	Australia	8.14	-	-	8.14	q
7	B	Brian Johnson	United States	x	7.94	8.09	8.09	q
8	B	Yahya Berrabah	Morocco	8.08	x	x	8.08	q
9	A	Chris Tomlinson	Great Britain & N.I.	8.06	8.02	8.00	8.06	q
10	B	Salim Sdiri	France	7.88	x	8.04	8.04	q
11	B	Gable Garenamotse	Botswana	7.81	8.03	8.01	8.03	q
12	A	Louis Tsatoumas	Greece	8.01	7.98	7.86	8.01	q
13	A	Li Jinzhe	China	8.01	7.92	7.90	8.01	
14	A	Tommi Evilä	Finland	x	7.84	8.01	8.01	
15	A	Kim Deok-Hyeon	South Korea	7.62	7.89	7.99	7.99	
16	B	Hussein Taher Al-Sabee	Saudi Arabia	7.89	7.99	x	7.99	
17	A	Viktor Kuznyetsov	Ukraine	7.98	7.87	7.95	7.98	
18	B	Ndiss Kaba Badji	Senegal	7.95	7.98	7.61	7.98	
19	A	Sebastian Bayer	Germany	7.98	x	x	7.98	
20	B	Nicholas Gordon	Jamaica	x	7.72	7.92	7.92	
21	A	Kafétien Gomis	France	7.82	7.90	7.68	7.90	
22	A	Alain Bailey	Jamaica	7.63	7.70	7.88	7.88	
23	A	Andriy Makarchev	Ukraine	x	7.68	7.87	7.87	
24	B	Olexiy Lukashevych	Ukraine	x	7.87	6.18	7.87	
25	A	Luis Méliz	Spain	7.87	x	x	7.87	SB
26	B	Roman Novotný	Czech Republic	x	7.86	x	7.86	
27	B	Stanley Gbagbeke	Nigeria	7.82	x	x	7.82	
28	B	Michel Tornéus	Sweden	7.78	7.63	7.78	7.78	
29	B	Morten Jensen	Denmark	7.69	7.75	7.71	7.75	
30	A	Stephan Louw	Namibia	x	7.74	7.69	7.74	
31	B	Tyrone Smith	Bermuda	7.62	7.72	7.71	7.72	
32	A	Aleksandr Menkov	Russia	7.72	x	x	7.72	
33	A	Ibrahim Camejo	Cuba	7.69	7.71	7.57	7.71	
34	B	Nils Winter	Germany	x	x	7.69	7.69	
35	A	Štepán Wagner	Czech Republic	7.52	7.68	7.49	7.68	
36	A	Mohamed Salman Al-Khuwalidi	Saudi Arabia	x	7.37	7.66	7.66	SB
37	A	Nikolay Atanasov	Bulgaria	7.63	x	x	7.63	
38	B	Miguel Pate	United States	x	x	7.61	7.61	
39	A	Hugo Chila	Ecuador	7.29	7.54	-	7.54	
39	A	Konstantin Safronov	Kazakhstan	x	7.54	7.29	7.54	
41	A	Daisuke Arakawa	Japan	7.39	7.50	7.53	7.53	
42	B	Yochai Halevi	Israel	7.42	7.39	x	7.42	SB
	A	Henry Dagmil	Philippines	x	x	x	NM	
	B	Carlos Jorge	Dominican Republic	x	x	x	NM	
	B	Clayton Latham	Saint Vincent and the Grenadines	x	x	x	NM	

Key: NR = National record, NM = No mark, Q = qualification by place in heat, q = qualification by overall place, SB = Seasonal best

=== Final ===
Rank	Athlete	Nationality	#1	#2	#3	#4	#5	#6	Result	Notes
1st place, gold medalist(s)	Dwight Phillips	United States	8.40	8.54	8.37	8.25	-	x	8.54	
2nd place, silver medalist(s)	Godfrey Khotso Mokoena	South Africa	x	8.47	8.31	8.19	x	x	8.47	
3rd place, bronze medalist(s)	Mitchell Watt	Australia	8.28	x	x	x	8.37	x	8.37	
4	Fabrice Lapierre	Australia	8.21	7.77	8.19	x	8.21	8.20	8.21	
5	Greg Rutherford	Great Britain & N.I.	7.83	7.96	x	8.05	8.15	8.17	8.17	
6	Salim Sdiri	France	7.78	x	7.99	8.07	7.92	7.83	8.07	
7	Gable Garenamotse	Botswana	8.06	8.04	x	7.77	7.83	7.69	8.06	
8	Chris Tomlinson	Great Britain & N.I.	8.02	7.93	7.93	7.66	8.06	8.02	8.06	
9	Brian Johnson	United States	6.30	x	7.86				7.86	
10	Yahya Berrabah	Morocco	5.91	x	7.83				7.83	
11	Louis Tsatoumas	Greece	x	7.59	x				7.59	
12	Irving Saladino	Panama	x	x	x				NM	

Key: NM = No mark
