= Athletics at the 2008 Summer Olympics – Men's long jump =

Men's long jump at the Games of the XXIX Olympiad
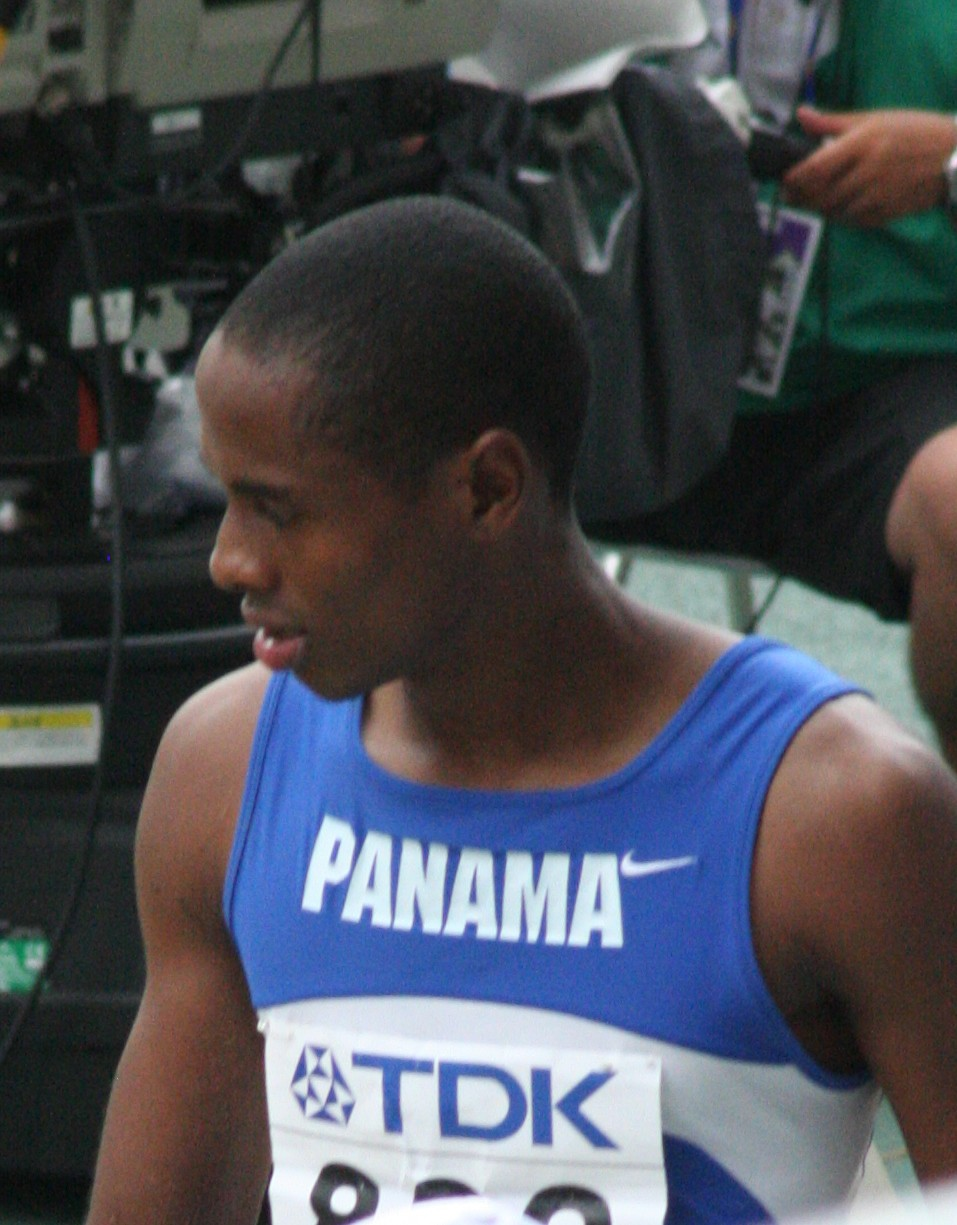
- Irving Saladino (2007 world championships)
- Venue: Beijing Olympic Stadium
- Dates: 16 August 2008 (qualifying); 18 August 2008 (final)
- Competitors: 38 from 32 nations
- Winning distance: 8.34

Medalists
| 1st place, gold medalist(s) | | Irving Saladino; Panama |
| 2nd place, silver medalist(s) | | Khotso Mokoena; South Africa |
| 3rd place, bronze medalist(s) | | Ibrahim Camejo; Cuba |

The men's long jump at the 2008 Olympic Games took place on 16 and 18 August at the Beijing Olympic Stadium. Thirty-eight athletes from 32 nations competed. The event was won by Irving Saladino of Panama, the nation's first Olympic gold medal in any event and its first medal the men's long jump. South Africa also won its first men's long jump medal, with Khotso Mokoena's silver. Ibrahim Camejo's bronze was Cuba's first medal in the event since 2000. This event marked the first time that an American did not classify to the final phase in a non-boycotted Olympic competition.

== Background ==
This was the 26th appearance of the event, which is one of 12 athletics events to have been held at every Summer Olympics. The returning finalists from the 2004 Games were fifth-place finisher Chris Tomlinson of Great Britain and twelfth-place finisher Salim Sdiri of France. Dwight Phillips, the reigning gold medalist who had won two world championships (2003, 2005) and would win two more later (2009, 2011) and finished third at the most recent championships, placed fourth in the U.S. Olympic trials and missed the team. The reigning world champion, Irving Saladino of Panama, was the favorite in Beijing.

Bermuda made its first appearance in the event. The United States appeared for the 25th time, most of any nation, having missed only the boycotted 1980 Games.

== Qualification ==
The qualifying standards were 8.20 m (26.9 ft) (A standard) and 8.05 m (26.41 ft) (B standard). Each National Olympic Committee (NOC) was able to enter up to three entrants providing they had met the A qualifying standard in the qualifying period (1 January 2007 to 23 July 2008). NOCs were also permitted to enter one athlete providing he had met the B standard in the same qualifying period. The maximum number of athletes per nation had been set at 3 since the 1930 Olympic Congress.

== Competition format ==
The 2008 competition used the two-round format with divided final introduced in 1952. The qualifying round gave each competitor three jumps to achieve a distance of 8.15 metres; if fewer than 12 men did so, the top 12 (including all those tied) would advance. The final provided each jumper with three jumps; the top eight jumpers received an additional three jumps for a total of six, with the best to count (qualifying round jumps were not considered for the final).

== Records ==
Prior to this competition, the existing world record, Olympic record, and world leading jump were as follows:

| World record | Mike Powell (USA) | 8.95 | Tokyo, Japan | 30 August 1991 |
| Olympic record | Bob Beamon (USA) | 8.90 | Mexico City, Mexico | 18 October 1968 |
| World Leading | Irving Saladino (PAN) | 8.73 | Hengelo, Netherlands | 24 May 2008 |

No new world or Olympic records were set for this event.

== Schedule ==
All times are China Standard Time (UTC+8)

| Date | Time | Round |
|---|---|---|
| Saturday, 16 August 2008 | 20:00 | Qualifying |
| Monday, 18 August 2008 | 20:10 | Final |

== Results ==
=== Qualifying ===
Qualifying Performance 8.15 (Q) or at least 12 best performers (q) advance to the Final.

| Rank | Group | Athlete | Nation | 1 | 2 | 3 | Distance | Notes |
|---|---|---|---|---|---|---|---|---|
| 1 | A | Louis Tsatoumas | Greece | 8.27 (+0.1) | — | — | 8.27 | Q |
| 2 | A | Ibrahim Camejo | Cuba | 8.23 (+0.5) | — | — | 8.23 | Q |
| 3 | A | Greg Rutherford | Great Britain | 8.16 (-0.1) | — | — | 8.16 | Q |
| 4 | A | Khotso Mokoena | South Africa | 8.03 (-0.1) | X | 8.14 (-0.1) | 8.14 | q |
| 5 | B | Ngonidzashe Makusha | Zimbabwe | 8.14 (0.0) | 7.94 (0.0) | — | 8.14 | q |
| 6 | B | Wilfredo Martínez | Cuba | 7.92 (+0.4) | 7.80 (+0.4) | 8.07 (+0.1) | ~~8.07~~ | q, DPG |
| 7 | B | Ndiss Kaba Badji | Senegal | 7.65 (-0.1) | 7.79 (-0.1) | 8.07 (-0.5) | 8.07 | q, SB |
| 8 | A | Hussein Taher Al-Sabee | Saudi Arabia | 5.47 (+0.3) | 8.04 ( -0.4) | X | 8.04 | q |
| 9 | B | Irving Saladino | Panama | X | X | 8.01 (+0.2) | 8.01 | q |
| 10 | A | Luis Felipe Méliz | Spain | X | 7.77 (-0.1) | 7.95 (+0.1) | 7.95 | q |
| 11 | A | Gable Garenamotse | Botswana | 7.58 (+0.3) | X | 7.95 (+0.4) | 7.95 | q |
| 12 | B | Roman Novotný | Czech Republic | 7.75 (+0.3) | 7.81 (-0.1) | 7.94 (-0.2) | 7.94 | q |
| 13 | A | Stephan Louw | Namibia | 7.73 (+0.1) | X | 7.93 (+0.6) | 7.93 | |
| 14 | B | Mohamed Salman Al-Khuwalidi | Saudi Arabia | X | X | 7.93 (+0.4) | 7.93 | |
| 15 | B | Tyrone Smith | Bermuda | 6.95 (+0.1) | 7.63 (-0.6) | 7.91 (-0.1) | 7.91 | |
| 16 | B | Fabrice Lapierre | Australia | 7.90 (+0.1) | X | X | 7.90 | |
| 17 | A | Yahya Berrabah | Morocco | 7.88 (+0.1) | X | X | 7.88 | |
| 17 | A | Tommi Evilä | Finland | X | X | 7.88 (+0.2) | 7.88 | |
| 19 | B | Trevell Quinley | United States | X | X | 7.87 (-0.2) | 7.87 | |
| 20 | B | Andrew Howe | Italy | 7.73 (+0.1) | 7.81 ( -0.2) | X | 7.81 | |
| 21 | A | Salim Sdiri | France | X | X | 7.81 (+0.3) | 7.81 | |
| 22 | B | Brian Johnson | United States | X | 7.79 (-0.1) | X | 7.79 | |
| 23 | A | Sebastien Bayer | Germany | X | 7.43 (+0.1) | 7.77 (0.0) | 7.77 | |
| 24 | A | Hugo Chila | Ecuador | 7.77 (+0.2) | X | X | 7.77 | |
| 24 | B | Andriy Makarchev | Ukraine | 7.77 (+0.3) | X | X | 7.77 | |
| 26 | A | Mauro da Silva | Brazil | X | 7.75 (-0.1) | X | 7.75 | |
| 27 | B | Chris Tomlinson | Great Britain | 7.52 (+0.4) | 7.62 (0.0) | 7.70 (+0.2) | 7.70 | |
| 28 | A | Li Runrun | China | 7.70 (+0.2) | X | 7.56 (+0.1) | 7.70 | SB |
| 29 | B | Tarik Bouguetaib | Morocco | 7.69 (-0.1) | X | X | 7.69 | |
| 30 | B | Herbert McGregor | Jamaica | 7.64 (0.0) | 7.46 (+0.3) | 7.36 (0.0) | 7.64 | |
| 31 | A | Morten Jensen | Denmark | X | 7.58 (+0.3) | 7.63 (-0.1) | 7.63 | |
| 32 | B | Louis Tristán | Peru | 7.58 (+0.1) | 7.62 (+0.3) | X | 7.62 | |
| 33 | A | Marcin Starzak | Poland | X | X | 7.62 (-0.2) | 7.62 | |
| 34 | A | Henry Dagmil | Philippines | 7.58 (0.0) | X | X | 7.58 | |
| 35 | A | Nikolai Atanasov | Bulgaria | X | X | 7.54 (-0.5) | 7.54 | |
| 36 | B | Julien Fivaz | Switzerland | 7.53 (0.0) | X | X | 7.53 | |
| 37 | A | Vladimir Malyavin | Russia | 7.32 (-0.2) | 7.35 (-0.1) | X | 7.35 | |
| 38 | B | Miguel Pate | United States | X | 7.34 (+0.4) | X | 7.34 | |
| — | B | Zhou Can | China | DNS | | | | |
| — | B | Arnaud Casquette | Mauritius | DNS | | | | |
| — | A | Issam Nima | Algeria | DNS | | | | |

=== Final ===
The final was held on 18 August 2008. Martínez was disqualified.

| Rank | Athlete | Nation | 1 | 2 | 3 | 4 | 5 | 6 | Distance |
|---|---|---|---|---|---|---|---|---|---|
| 1st place, gold medalist(s) | Irving Saladino | Panama | X (+0.1) | 8.17 (-0.1) | 8.21 (+0.1) | 8.34 (-0.3) | X (-0.2) | X (-0.5) | 8.34 |
| 2nd place, silver medalist(s) | Khotso Mokoena | South Africa | 7.86 (+0.1) | X (0.0) | 8.02 (+0.2) | 8.24 (0.0) | X (-0.2) | X (-0.4) | 8.24 |
| 3rd place, bronze medalist(s) | Ibrahim Camejo | Cuba | 7.94 | 8.09 | 8.08 | 7.88 | 7.93 | 8.20 | 8.20 |
| 4 | Ngonidzashe Makusha | Zimbabwe | 8.19 | 8.06 | 8.05 | 8.10 | 8.05 | 6.48 | 8.19 |
| 5 | Ndiss Kaba Badji | Senegal | 8.03 | X | 8.02 | 8.16 SB | 8.03 | 7.92 | 8.16 |
| 6 | Luis Felipe Méliz | Spain | X | 8.02 | X | X | 7.98 | 8.07 | 8.07 |
| 7 | Roman Novotný | Czech Republic | 7.87 | 7.75 | 8.00 | X | 7.82 | 7.94 | 8.00 |
| 8 | Gable Garenamotse | Botswana | X | 7.85 | — | Did not advance | | | 7.85 |
| 9 | Greg Rutherford | Great Britain | X | 5.20 | 7.84 | Did not advance | | | 7.84 |
| 10 | Hussein Taher Al-Sabee | Saudi Arabia | 7.80 | X | X | Did not advance | | | 7.80 |
| — | Louis Tsatoumas | Greece | X | X | X | Did not advance | | | No mark |
| ~~5~~ DSQ | Wilfredo Martínez | Cuba | ~~7.60~~ | ~~7.90~~ | X | ~~8.04~~ | X | ~~8.19~~ | ~~8.19~~ |
