= 2014 European Athletics Championships – Men's long jump =

Men's long jump at the European Athletics Championships

The men's long jump at the 2014 European Athletics Championships took place at the Letzigrund on 15 and 17 August.

== Medalists ==
Gold	Greg Rutherford; Great Britain
Silver	Louis Tsatoumas; Greece
Bronze	Kafétien Gomis; France

== Records ==
Standing records prior to the 2014 European Athletics Championships
World record	Mike Powell (USA)	8.95	Tokyo, Japan	30 August 1991
European record	Robert Emmiyan (URS)	8.86	Tsaghkadzor, Soviet Union	22 May 1987
Championship record	Christian Reif (GER)	8.47	Barcelona, Spain	1 August 2010
World Leading	Greg Rutherford (GBR)	8.51	Chula Vista, United States	24 April 2014
European Leading	Greg Rutherford (GBR)	8.51	Chula Vista, United States	24 April 2014

== Schedule ==
Date	Time	Round
15 August 2014	21:30	Qualification
17 August 2014	18:00	Final

== Results ==
=== Qualification ===
Qualification: Qualification Performance 8.00 (Q) or at least 12 best performers advance to the final

Rank	Group	Athlete	Nationality	#1	#2	#3	Result	Notes
1	B	Louis Tsatoumas	Greece	7.94	8.19		8.19	Q
2	B	Eusebio Cáceres	Spain	7.64	8.05		8.05	Q
3	B	Greg Rutherford	Great Britain	7.95	8.03		8.03	Q
4	A	Christian Reif	Germany	7.52	8.02		8.02	Q
5	A	Chris Tomlinson	Great Britain	7.68	7.27	7.89	7.89	q
6	A	Tomasz Jaszczuk	Poland	x	7.83	7.58	7.83	q
7	B	Kafétien Gomis	France	7.83	x	x	7.83	q
8	A	JJ Jegede	Great Britain	7.64	7.76	7.81	7.81	q
9	B	Michel Tornéus	Sweden	7.81	7.69	–	7.81	q
10	B	Adrian Strzałkowski	Poland	7.70	7.71	7.80	7.80	q
11	A	Elvijs Misāns	Latvia	7.54	7.79	7.71	7.79	q
12	B	Ignisious Gaisah	Netherlands	7.78	x	7.72	7.78	q
13	A	Aleksandr Menkov	Russia	7.63	x	7.78	7.78	
14	B	Aleksandr Petrov	Russia	x	5.29	7.75	7.75	
15	A	Salim Sdiri	France	7.53	x	7.74	7.74	
16	A	Tomas Vitonis	Lithuania	7.68	5.41	5.26	7.68	
17	B	Povilas Mykolaitis	Lithuania	x	7.61	7.66	7.66	
18	B	Yves Zellweger	Switzerland	7.64	7.04	7.63	7.64	
19	A	Yeóryios Tsákonas	Greece	7.64	x	7.44	7.64	
20	B	Jean Marie Okutu	Spain	7.64	x	7.39	7.64	
21	A	Julian Howard	Germany	7.61	x	7.63	7.63	
22	B	Izmir Smajlaj	Albania	7.56	7.42	7.29	7.56	
23	B	Sebastian Bayer	Germany	x	7.33	7.56	7.56	
24	B	Dino Pervan	Croatia	x	7.53	x	7.53	
25	A	Mathias Broothaerts	Belgium	7.48	x	7.41	7.48	
26	B	Emanuele Catania	Italy	x	7.25	7.31	7.31	
27	A	Nikolaos Xenikakis	Greece	6.99	7.12	7.06	7.12	
28	A	Luis Méliz	Spain	6.85	4.34	–	6.85	
29	A	Stefano Tremigliozzi	Italy	x	x	4.77	4.77	
	A	Gor Nerkararyan	Armenia	–	r		NM	

=== Final ===
Rank	Athlete	Nationality	#1	#2	#3	#4	#5	#6	Result	Notes
1st place, gold medalist(s)	Greg Rutherford	Great Britain	7.95	8.27	8.18	8.29	–	–	8.29	
2nd place, silver medalist(s)	Louis Tsatoumas	Greece	8.15	7.82	x	7.83	7.86	7.72	8.15	
3rd place, bronze medalist(s)	Kafétien Gomis	France	x	x	8.13	x	7.81	8.14	8.14	
4	Eusebio Cáceres	Spain	x	8.11	x	–	r		8.11	SB
5	Michel Tornéus	Sweden	x	x	8.00	x	8.05	8.09	8.09	SB
6	Ignisious Gaisah	Netherlands	8.03	8.08	7.85	7.80	7.94	7.94	8.08	
7	Tomasz Jaszczuk	Poland	7.69	x	7.96	x	x	8.07	8.07	
8	Christian Reif	Germany	x	7.95	7.91	7.88	x	7.66	7.95	
9	JJ Jegede	Great Britain	7.88	x	7.65				7.88	
10	Elvijs Misāns	Latvia	x	7.76	7.69				7.76	
11	Chris Tomlinson	Great Britain	7.26	7.73	7.75				7.75	
12	Adrian Strzałkowski	Poland	7.63	7.62	7.59				7.63	
