= 2009 European Athletics Indoor Championships – Men's long jump =

The Men's long jump event at the 2009 European Athletics Indoor Championships was held on March 7–8.

== Medalists ==
Gold	Silver	Bronze
Sebastian Bayer; Germany	Nils Winter; Germany	Marcin Starzak; Poland

== Results ==
=== Qualification ===
Qualifying perf. 8.00 (Q) or 8 best performers (q) advanced to the Final.

Rank	Group	Athlete	Nationality	#1	#2	#3	Result	Note
1	A	Sebastian Bayer	Germany	x	7.99	8.12	8.12	Q
2	A	Nils Winter	Germany	7.98	8.04		8.04	Q
3	B	Nikolai Atanasov	Bulgaria	7.88	8.00		8.00	Q, =SB
4	B	Tommi Evilä	Finland	7.58	7.85	7.99	7.99	q, SB
5	B	Kafetien Gomis	France	7.76	7.79	7.99	7.99	q
6	A	Greg Rutherford	Great Britain	7.99	–	x	7.99	q
7	B	Marcin Starzak	Poland	7.85	7.73	7.97	7.97	q
8	B	Juho-Matti Pimiä	Finland	7.94	7.87	x	7.94	q, PB
9	A	Petteri Lax	Finland	x	7.92	x	7.92	
10	A	Salim Sdiri	France	7.91	7.84	7.74	7.92	
11	B	Morten Jensen	Denmark	x	7.56	7.82	7.82	
12	B	Louis Tsatoumas	Greece	7.79	7.76	7.60	7.79	
13	A	Roman Novotný	Czech Republic	7.69	x	7.77	7.77	
14	A	Ruslan Gataullin	Russia	7.69	7.61	7.67	7.69	
15	A	Darius Aučyna	Lithuania	7.67	7.18	x	7.67	
16	A	Jaroslav Dobrovodský	Slovakia	7.59	7.54	7.48	7.59	
17	A	Michel Tornéus	Sweden	7.58	7.56	7.48	7.58	
18	A	Maris Greninš	Latvia	7.58	7.36	7.56	7.58	
19	B	Admir Bregu	Albania	7.54	x	7.30	7.54	
20	B	Arsen Sargsyan	Armenia	7.40	7.47	7.53	7.53	
21	B	Povilas Mykolaitis	Lithuania	x	7.48	7.42	7.48	
22	B	Boris Bojinov	Bulgaria	7.48	x	x	7.48	
23	A	Gaspar Araújo	Portugal	x	7.44	x	7.44	
24	A	Stefano Tremigliozzi	Italy	7.29	x	7.43	7.43	
25	B	Aleksandr Petrov	Russia	x	x	7.43	7.43	
26	B	Adrian Vasile	Romania	7.27	7.42	7.38	7.42	
27	A	Luca Maccapani	San Marino	x	6.91	6.77	6.91	
27	A	Atanas Rusenov	Bulgaria	x	5.51	x	5.51	
	B	Jaanus Uudmäe	Estonia	x	–	–	NM	
	B	Christoph Stolz	Germany	x	x	x	NM	

=== Final ===
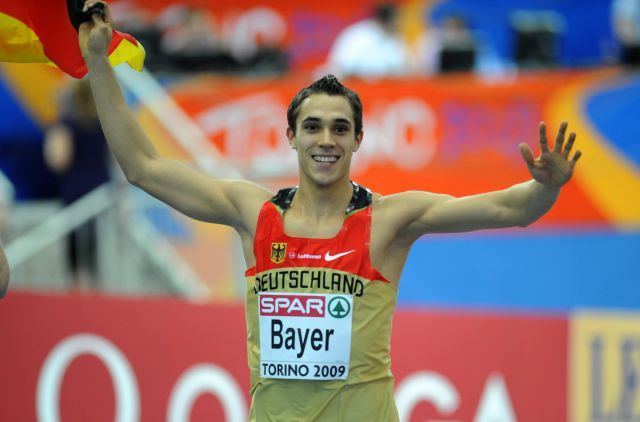
Sebastian Bayer of Germany won the gold medal breaking the European indoor record.

Rank	Athlete	Nationality	#1	#2	#3	#4	#5	#6	Result	Note
1st place, gold medalist(s)	Sebastian Bayer	Germany	8.29	–	–	–	x	8.71	8.71	AR
2nd place, silver medalist(s)	Nils Winter	Germany	x	8.18	7.98	x	8.22	x	8.22	PB
3rd place, bronze medalist(s)	Marcin Starzak	Poland	8.01	8.10	8.04	8.03	8.18	x	8.18	NR
4	Kafetien Gomis	France	7.71	x	8.12	x	x	7.91	8.12	PB
5	Nikolai Atanasov	Bulgaria	8.02	7.92	x	x	8.04	8.11	8.11	PB
6	Greg Rutherford	Great Britain	7.92	7.99	8.00	x	x	7.99	8.00	PB
7	Tommi Evilä	Finland	7.78	x	x	7.85	7.86	7.76	7.86	
8	Juho-Matti Pimiä	Finland	x	x	7.84	x	7.77	7.70	7.84	
