= Sdiri =

Sdiri (Arabic: سديري) is a Tunisian surname. It may refer to:

- Hayfa Sdiri (born 1997), Tunisian entrepreneur
- Salim Sdiri (born 1978), French long jumper
