= 2007 European Athletics Indoor Championships – Men's long jump =

The Men's long jump event at the 2007 European Athletics Indoor Championships was held on March 3–4.

== Medalists ==
Gold	Silver	Bronze
Andrew Howe; Italy	Louis Tsatoumas; Greece	Salim Sdiri; France

== Results ==
=== Qualification ===
Qualifying perf. 8.00 (Q) or 8 best performers (q) advanced to the Final.

Rank	Group	Athlete	Nationality	#1	#2	#3	Result	Note
1	B	Louis Tsatoumas	Greece	8.09			8.09	Q
2	A	Salim Sdiri	France	8.09			8.00	Q
3	B	Chris Tomlinson	Great Britain	7.96	X	–	7.96	q, SB
4	B	Nils Winter	Germany	7.68	7.76	7.94	7.94	q, SB
5	B	Kafetien Gomis	France	7.84	7.87	X	7.87	q
6	A	Oleksandr Patselya	Ukraine	7.87	7.82	7.75	7.87	q
7	A	Marcin Starzak	Poland	7.51	7.84	7.86	7.86	q
8	A	Andrew Howe	Italy	X	7.81	7.58	7.81	q
9	B	Morten Jensen	Denmark	X	7.48	7.75	7.75	
10	B	Valeriy Vasylyev	Ukraine	7.36	7.38	7.74	7.75	
11	A	Andrejs Maškancevs	Latvia	7.57	7.59	7.73	7.73	
12	A	Petteri Lax	Finland	7.63	7.64	7.70	7.70	
13	A	Oleksiy Lukashevych	Ukraine	7.64	X	7.62	7.64	
14	A	Christian Reif	Germany	7.41	7.58	–	7.58	
15	B	Jaanus Uudmäe	Estonia	7.33	7.48	X	7.48	
16	B	Julien Fivaz	Switzerland	X	X	7.47	7.47	
17	B	Admir Bregu	Albania	X	7.26	5.47	7.26	
18	B	Denis Sinyavskiy	Russia	7.02	7.14	7.05	7.14	
19	A	Federico Gorrieri	San Marino	6.70	–	6.66	6.70	
	A	Dmitriy Sapinskiy	Russia	X	X	X	NM	
	A	Vitaliy Shkurlatov	Russia	X	–	–	NM	
	B	Asterios Nousios	Greece	X	X	X	NM	

=== Final ===
Rank	Athlete	Nationality	#1	#2	#3	#4	#5	#6	Result	Note
1st place, gold medalist(s)	Andrew Howe	Italy	7.89	7.90	7.87	7.79	8.30	7.93	8.30	NR
2nd place, silver medalist(s)	Louis Tsatoumas	Greece	X	7.96	X	8.02	X	X	8.02	
3rd place, bronze medalist(s)	Salim Sdiri	France	7.71	7.71	X	7.98	8.00	7.96	8.00	
4	Kafetien Gomis	France	7.72	X	7.93	7.80	X	X	7.93	
5	Chris Tomlinson	Great Britain	7.82	7.88	7.89	X	7.52	7.82	7.89	
6	Marcin Starzak	Poland	7.84	7.88	7.85	X	X	X	7.88	
7	Nils Winter	Germany	7.52	X	X	7.76	X	7.88	7.88	
	Oleksandr Patselya	Ukraine	X	–	–	–	–	–	NM	
