= 2010 European Athletics Championships – Men's long jump =

Men's long jump at the European Athletics Championships

The men's long jump at the 2010 European Athletics Championships was held at the Estadi Olímpic Lluís Companys on 30 July and 1 August.

== Medalists ==
Gold	Christian Reif; Germany (GER)
Silver	Kafétien Gomis; France (FRA)
Bronze	(United Kingdom) Chris Tomlinson; Great Britain (GBR)

== Records ==
Standing records prior to the 2010 European Athletics Championships
World record	Mike Powell (USA)	8.95	Tokyo, Japan	30 August 1991
European record	Robert Emmiyan (URS)	8.86	Tsaghkadzor, Soviet Union	22 May 1987
Championship record	Robert Emmiyan (URS)	8.41	Stuttgart, West Germany	29 August 1986
World Leading	Dwight Phillips (USA)	8.46	Monaco	22 July 2010
European Leading	Christian Reif (GER)	8.27	Hengelo, Netherlands	30 May 2010
Broken records during the 2010 European Athletics Championships
Championship record	Christian Reif (GER)	8.47	Barcelona, Spain	1 August 2010
World Leading	Christian Reif (GER)	8.47	Barcelona, Spain	1 August 2010
European Leading	Christian Reif (GER)	8.47	Barcelona, Spain	1 August 2010

== Schedule ==
Date	Time	Round
30 July 2010	18:35	Qualification
1 August 2010	20:10	Final

== Results ==
=== Qualification ===
Qualification: Qualification Performance a total of 8.00 (Q) or at least 12 best performers advance to the final

Rank	Group	Athlete	Nationality	#1	#2	#3	Result	Notes
1	B	Eusebio Cáceres	Spain	7.73	7.90	8.27	8.27	Q, =EL
2	A	Christian Reif	Germany	x	7.79	8.27	8.27	Q, =EL
3	B	Chris Tomlinson	Great Britain & N.I.	7.98	8.20		8.20	Q, SB
4	A	Louis Tsatoumas	Greece	8.17			8.17	Q
5	B	Andrew Howe	Italy	8.15			8.15	Q
6	B	Michel Tornéus	Sweden	8.12			8.12	Q, PB
7	B	Salim Sdiri	France	8.09			8.09	Q
8	A	Luis Felipe Méliz	Spain	7.94	8.06		8.06	Q, =SB
9	A	Kafétien Gomis	France	x	8.04		8.04	Q
10	A	Tommi Evilä	Finland	7.91	7.90	8.01	8.01	Q
11	B	Roman Novotný	Czech Republic	7.86	x	8.00	8.00	Q
12	B	Petteri Lax	Finland	7.48	7.98	x	7.98	q, SB
13	B	Povilas Mykolaitis	Lithuania	x	7.85	7.94	7.94	SB
14	B	Pavel Shalin	Russia	7.81	7.66	7.94	7.94	
15	A	Dmitriy Plotnikov	Russia	x	7.92	7.37	7.92	
16	A	Emanuele Formichetti	Italy	x	7.91	7.80	7.91	
17	A	Otto Kilpi	Finland	7.81	7.90	7.78	7.90	
18	A	Yochai Halevi	Israel	x	7.78	7.90	7.90	
19	A	Gaspar Araújo	Portugal	x	7.83	7.87	7.87	
20	B	Jānis Leitis	Latvia	6.30	7.87	x	7.87	SB
21	A	Stefano Tremigliozzi	Italy	7.41	7.80	x	7.80	
22	B	Oleksandr Soldatkin	Ukraine	x	7.66	7.32	7.66	
23	A	Joan Lino Martínez	Spain	7.62	7.63	x	7.63	
24	B	Zacharias Arnos	Cyprus	x	7.37	7.61	7.61	
25	B	Arsen Sargsyan	Armenia	7.60	x	7.59	7.60	
26	A	Thorsteinn Ingvarsson	Iceland	7.44	x	7.59	7.59	
27	B	Mihaíl Mertzanídis-Despotéris	Greece	x	x	7.58	7.58	
28	A	Tõnis Sahk	Estonia	7.46	7.41	7.34	7.46	
29	B	Sávvas Diakonikólas	Greece	x	7.22	7.46	7.46	
	A	Morten Jensen	Denmark	x	x	x	NM	
	A	Admir Bregu	Albania	x	x	x	NM	
	B	Nikolay Atanasov	Bulgaria	x	x	–	NM	

=== Final ===
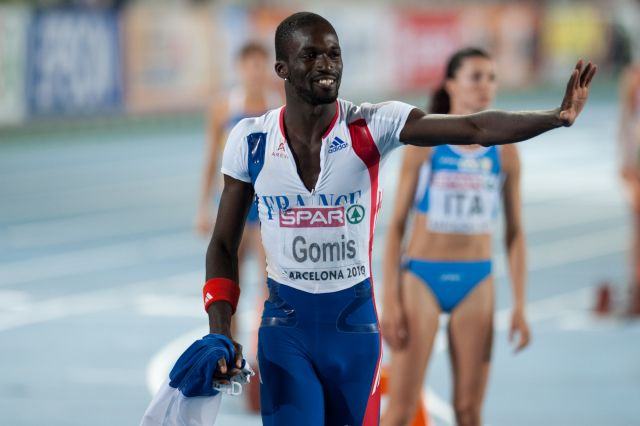
Gomis of France took the silver – his first major international medal.

Rank	Athlete	Nationality	#1	#2	#3	#4	#5	#6	Result	Notes
1st place, gold medalist(s)	Christian Reif	Germany	x	7.87	8.47	–	–	8.00	8.47	WL, CR, PB
2nd place, silver medalist(s)	Kafétien Gomis	France	8.00	x	x	x	x	8.24	8.24	PB
3rd place, bronze medalist(s)	Chris Tomlinson	Great Britain & N.I.	8.18	7.97	8.05	8.23	8.20	7.57	8.23	SB
4	Salim Sdiri	France	8.20	x	x	x	x	8.12	8.20	
5	Andrew Howe	Italy	7.96	8.12	8.00	7.74	8.08	7.97	8.12	
6	Louis Tsatoumas	Greece	x	8.09	x	x	7.66	x	8.09	SB
7	Petteri Lax	Finland	7.96	x	x	x	x	x	7.96	
8	Eusebio Cáceres	Spain	7.92	x	7.93	–	x	x	7.93	
9	Michel Tornéus	Sweden	7.77	7.92	7.88				7.92	
10	Tommi Evilä	Finland	7.56	7.62	7.91				7.91	
11	Luis Felipe Méliz	Spain	x	7.90	7.90				7.90	
12	Roman Novotný	Czech Republic	x	7.65	x				7.65	
