= Nikolay Atanasov =

Bulgarian long jumper

Personal information
- Born: 11 December 1974 (age 51) Sofia, Bulgaria
- Parent: Atanas Atanasov (runner) (father)

Sport
- Coached by: Atanas Atanasov (long jumper)
- Now coaching: Denis Dimitrov

Nikolay Atanasov-Joko (Bulgarian: Николай Атанасов-Джоко; born 11 December 1974 in Sofia), also spelled Nikolai Atanasov, is a Bulgarian long jumper. His personal best jump is 8.31 metres, achieved in July 2003 in Pirgos.

He competed at the World Championships in 1999, 2003 and 2007, the Olympic Games in 2000, 2004 and 2008, the 2002 European Indoor Championships and the 2006 European Championships. On neither occasion he reached the final. He finally reached the final at the 2008 World Indoor Championships, finishing fifth.

On national and regional level, Atanasov won the Bulgarian Championships nine times, the Bulgarian Indoor Championships eight times, the Balkan Championships once and the Balkan Indoor Championships three times.

== Career ==
He competed representing the SCLA "Lokomotiv" Plovdiv athletics club. Atanasov was coached by Atanas Atanasov. He was considered one of the most eccentric personalities in the sport, which made him appreciated by some but disliked by others.

Atanasov won his first Bulgarian indoor championship in 1996. His winning result of 7.22 metres was significantly shorter than the previous years when Galin Georgiev had dominated the sport, but Atanasov would later jump on par with Georgiev's results, while maintaining a several-year-long rivalry with Petar Dachev. At the Bulgarian championships, Atanasov won his first title in 1998 before spending the next year alternating with Petar Dachev as national champion; in addition, Atanas Rusenov entered the rivalry to win the title in 2005. Nikolay Atanasov also competed in sprints in his early career, winning the silver medal in the 100 metres at the 1998 Bulgarian championships, and competing in the 200 metres and long jump at the 1998 Balkan Games.

In 1999 he concentrated on the long jump, winning the silver medal at the Balkan Indoor Athletics Championships, winning the national championships and the European Cup Second League Group B meet, and competing at the 1999 World Championships. Jumping 7.86 metres at the World Championships, he fell a few centimetres short of a place in the final. Atanasov had surpassed 8 metres for the first time that year, jumping 8.09 metres in February in Sofia.

In 2000 Atanasov improved to 8.20 metres, achieved in July 2000 in Dimitrovgrad, Serbia. He became Bulgarian indoor champion and finished second at the Bulgarian championships as well as meets including Memorial Josefa Odlozila and Golden Spike. At the Olympic Games however, he only managed 7.62 metres and was knocked out in the qualification. This translated into a less eventful 2001, where he won silver at the national indoor championship and bronze at the 2001 Balkan Games. His only competition over 8 metres was the Bulgarian championships, which he won in 8.07 metres. Following another silver medal at the 2002 Bulgarian indoor championships, he was knocked out of the 2002 European Indoor Championships in qualifying before missing most of the outdoor meets including the nationals.

Atanasov would achieve his lifetime best in 2003. Following a string of second places, first at the Bulgarian indoor championships and then in meets on foreign soil such as the Cezmi Or Memorial, the 2002 Balkan Championships and the Sonatrach Meeting in Algiers, Atanasov jumped 8.31 metres on 27 July in Pyrgos. He won that meeting as well as the Thessaloniki International in August, before competing at the 2003 World Championships. 8.31 was the joint seventh best in the world in 2003, and the second best in the Balkans, wedged in between the Greek jumpers Louis Tsatoumas (8.34) and Dimitrios Filindras (8.30).

2004 saw Atanasov win both the Bulgarian indoor championships, the Balkan Indoor Championships and the Bulgarian championships. At the latter, he jumped 8.14 metres, his best to date on Bulgarian soil. Abroad, Atanasov also won the IAAF Grand Prix in Zagreb, but placed slightly lower at the Athletissima, Madrid Meeting and Gugl-Meeting, before bowing out once again in the Olympic Games qualifying round. Despite jumping 8.16 metres in September 2004 and becoming Bulgarian indoor champion once again in February 2005, he did not compete in any major international competitions in 2005. Domestically, he finished second at the 2005 Bulgarian championships and the 2006 Bulgarian indoor championships, before winning the Balkan Indoor Championships and the Bulgarian championships in 2006. He barely managed to surpass the 8-metre mark during the season and finished lowly at the 2006 European Championships.

In 2007 Atanasov won four titles; the national and Balkan titles both indoor and outdoor, notably jumping 8.16 metres to win the 2007 Balkan Championships in Sofia, his best ever jump on home soil. The 2007 World Championships yet again proved too hard, before he finally reached an international final at the 2008 World Indoor Championships. Atanasov jumped 7.90 to finish fifth. He competed rather sparingly during the summer, and did not manage to top his 7.90 result a single time. He came closest at the Bulgarian championships where he won the silver medal in 7.87, but trailed far behind at the 2008 Olympic Games. Much of the same happened in 2009, when a fifth place at the 2009 European Indoor Championships in 8.11 metres was followed by another Bulgarian championship title, before failing to reach the final round at the 2009 World Championships. His 2009 Bulgarian Athletics Championships title was his seventh. He followed that up by performing the best of all Bulgarian athletes at the 2009 European Indoor Athletics Championships, earning him a special award from the Bulgarian Athletics Federation. By now, Atanasov had reached the age of 35 and was considered a masters athlete.

Atanasov would never surpass 8 metres again, despite coming close in 2010. He won the Bulgarian championship title in 7.98 metres, and also won the Bulgarian indoor championships yet again. He repeated the same double in 2011, when he also won a silver medal at the Balkan Championships. On higher international level, he did not fare as well, being knocked out in the qualification at the 2010 World Indoor Championships, the 2010 European Championships, the 2011 European Indoor Championships and the 2012 European Championships. At the 2010 European Championships, he failed to register a valid result. His last domestic title was the 2012 Bulgarian indoor championships.

In 2011, Atansov left Lokomotiv Plovdiv and joined Beroe Stara Zagora due to financial reasons. Part of the conditions of his club change were to keep his same coach, Atanas Atanasov. In 2012 at the age of 38, Atanasov announced he was retiring from professional athletics, but that he would still compete recreationally. He also started a business selling clothing modeled by Bulgarian athletes. His last outings in domestic competition were a 4th place at the 2013 Bulgarian indoor championships and a 6th place at the 2013 Bulgarian championships.

He is now a coach for Lokomotiv Plovdiv. Atanasov-Joko is the coach and mentor of Bulgarian sprinter Denis Dimitrov.

== Personal life ==
Atanasov's right leg is 2 cm shorter than his left. Although this would normally be considered a hindrance in the long jump, Atanasaov used it to his advantage by crouching before stepping on the board for takeoff.

Atanasov is the son of Atanas Atanasov, the former Bulgarian record-holder in the 800 m and 1500 m. Coincidentally, his father has the same first and last name as his coach Atanas Zapryanov Atanasov, who he is not related to. His nickname "Joko" comes from the fact that his father liked to drink lemonade, and a movie titled "Lemonade Joe" was playing in cinemas at the time. Combining his father's name with the film's main character name, the "Joko" moniker was created.

Atanasov was a talented 100 metres sprinter as well, having an unofficial personal best of 10.56 seconds.
