= Eusebio Cáceres =

Spanish long jumper (born 1991)

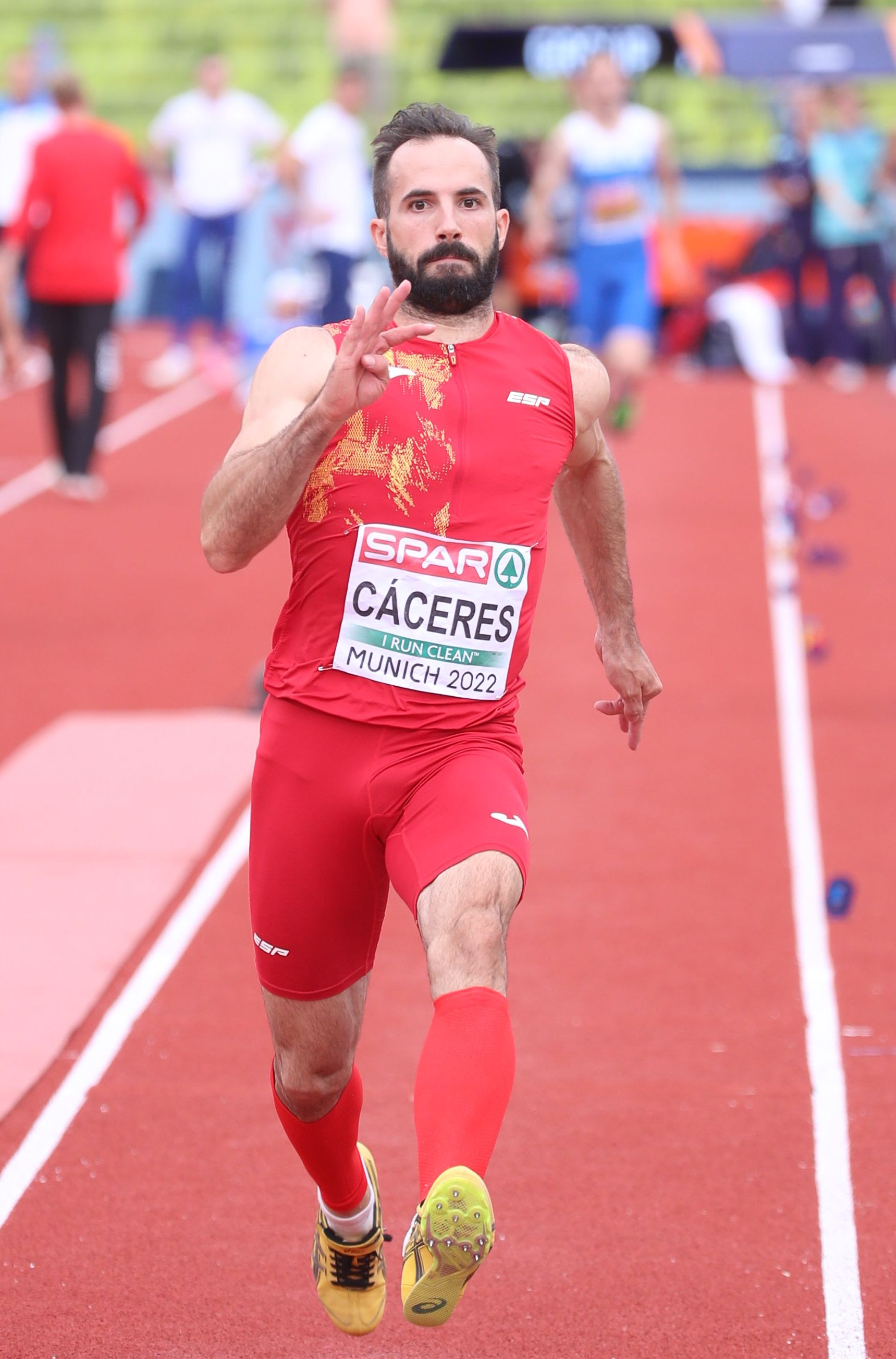
- Cáceres in 2022

Personal information
- Full name: Eusebio Cáceres López
- Born: 10 September 1991 (age 34) Onil, Spain
- Height: 1.74 m (5 ft 9 in)
- Weight: 69 kg (152 lb)

Sport
- Country: Spain
- Sport: Athletics
- Event: Long jump

Achievements and titles
- Personal bests: Long jump: 8.37 (2013); 100m dash: 10.37 (2012)

Eusebio Cáceres López (born 10 September 1991 in Onil) is a Spanish track and field athlete who specialises in the long jump.

== Career ==
He began competing in a wide variety of events at the start of his junior career, including the decathlon. He won the long jump bronze medal at the 2008 World Junior Championships in Athletics. His first senior gold medal in the event soon followed at the 2009 European Team Championships, where he jumped a personal best of eight metres, and he also reached the semi-finals of the 100 metres at the 2009 European Athletics Junior Championships. He helped the Spanish 4×100 metres relay team to sixth in the event final in a national junior record time of 40.03 seconds. Cáceres set the world junior best mark of 5984 points in the indoor heptathlon at the 2010 Spanish junior championships. He chose to compete in his speciality at the 2010 World Junior Championships in Athletics and won the long jump silver medal, finishing behind Luvo Manyonga.

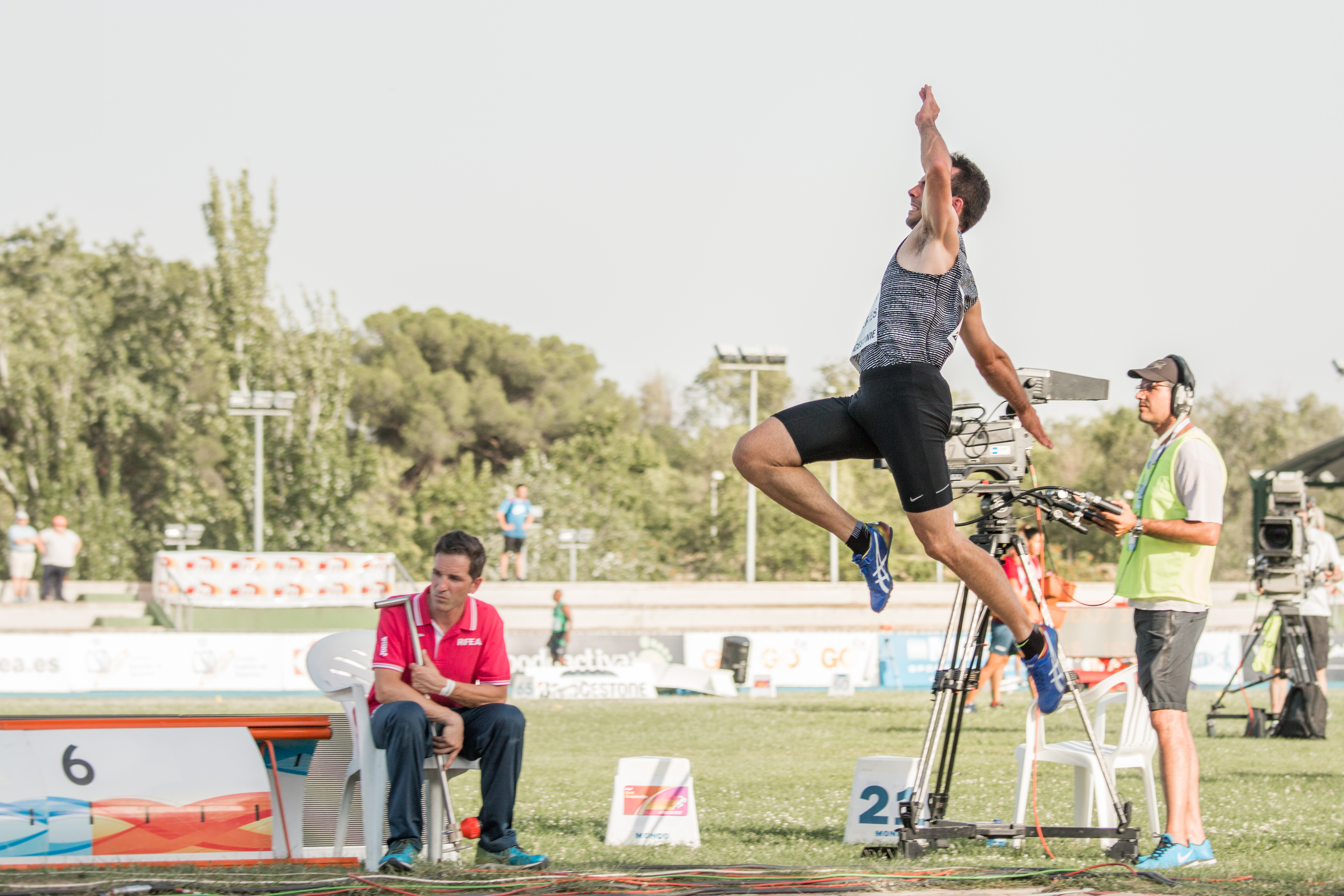
Eusebio Cáceres jumping during the IAAF World Challenge Meeting Madrid 2017.

In the long jump qualifying rounds at the 2010 European Athletics Championships, he cleared a European junior record distance of 8.27 m to top the rankings. He failed to repeat that form in the final round, finishing eighth, but his jump remained the best of that year's tournament with the sole exception of Christian Reif's championship record effort of 8.47 m. It was also the second best mark by any European athlete that year, ranking him in the top eight of the discipline worldwide in 2010.

He competed at the 2012 Olympics, but did not reach the final.

He reached the final of the 2013 World Championships, finishing in 4th. A year later, he also finished in 4th place at the 2014 European Championships.

At the 2020 Olympics, he finished 4th in the men's long jump, having finished 4th in the 2019 European Indoor Championships.

== Competition record ==
Year	Competition	Venue	Position	Event	Notes
Representing Spain
2007	World Youth Championships	Ostrava, Czech Republic	6th	Octathlon	6.144 pts
2008	World Junior Championships	Bydgoszcz, Poland	3rd	Long jump	7.59 m (-0.2 m/s)
2008	World Junior Championships	Bydgoszcz, Poland	—	4 × 100 m relay	DNF
2009	European Junior Championships	Novi Sad, Serbia	5th (h)	100 m	10.66
2009	European Junior Championships	Novi Sad, Serbia	6th	Long jump	7.64 m
2009	European Junior Championships	Novi Sad, Serbia	6th	4 x 100 m relay	40.03
2010	World Junior Championships	Moncton, New Brunswick, Canada	2nd	Long jump	7.90 m (-1.2 m/s)
2010	World Junior Championships	Moncton, New Brunswick, Canada	16th (h)	4 × 100 m relay	40.82
2010	European Championships	Barcelona, Spain	8th	Long jump	7.93 m
2011	European Indoor Championships	Paris, France	11th (q)	Long jump	7.83 m
2011	European U23 Championships	Ostrava, Czech Republic	8th	Long jump	7.64 m (+1.1 m/s)
2011	European U23 Championships	Ostrava, Czech Republic	—	4 × 100 m relay	DNF
2011	World Championships	Daegu, South Korea	18th (q)	Long jump	7.91 m
2012	World Indoor Championships	Istanbul, Turkey	11th (q)	Long jump	7.71 m
2012	European Championships	Helsinki, Finland	5th	Long jump	8.06 m
2012	Olympic Games	London, United Kingdom	14th (q)	Long jump	7.92 m
2013	European U23 Championships	Tampere, Finland	1st	Long jump	8.37 m (+1.1 m/s)
2013	European U23 Championships	Tampere, Finland	3rd	4 × 100 m relay	38.87 s
2013	World Championships	Moscow, Russia	4th	Long jump	8.26 m
2014	European Championships	Zürich, Switzerland	4th	Long jump	8.11 m
2016	European Championships	Amsterdam, Netherlands	11th (q)	Long jump	7.91 m (w)^{1}
2017	European Indoor Championships	Belgrade, Serbia	9th (q)	Long jump	7.72 m
2017	World Championships	London, United Kingdom	—	Long jump	NM
2018	World Indoor Championships	Birmingham, United Kingdom	8th	Long jump	7.91 m
2019	European Indoor Championships	Glasgow, United Kingdom	4th	Long jump	7.98 m
2019	World Championships	Doha, Qatar	7th	Long jump	8.01 m
2021	Olympic Games	Tokyo, Japan	4th	Long jump	8.18 m
2022	Ibero-American Championships	La Nucía, Spain	1st	Long jump	8.05 m
2022	World Championships	Eugene, United States	8th	Long jump	7.93 m
2022	European Championships	Munich, Germany	4th	Long jump	7.98 m
2024	European Championships	Rome, Italy	11th	Long jump	7.54 m
2026	World Indoor Championships	Toruń, Poland	8th	Long jump	8.04 m
2026	European Championships	Birmingham, United Kingdom	7th	Long jump	7.92 m

^{1}No mark in the final
