= Athletics at the 2012 Summer Olympics – Men's long jump =

Men's long jump at the Games of the XXX Olympiad
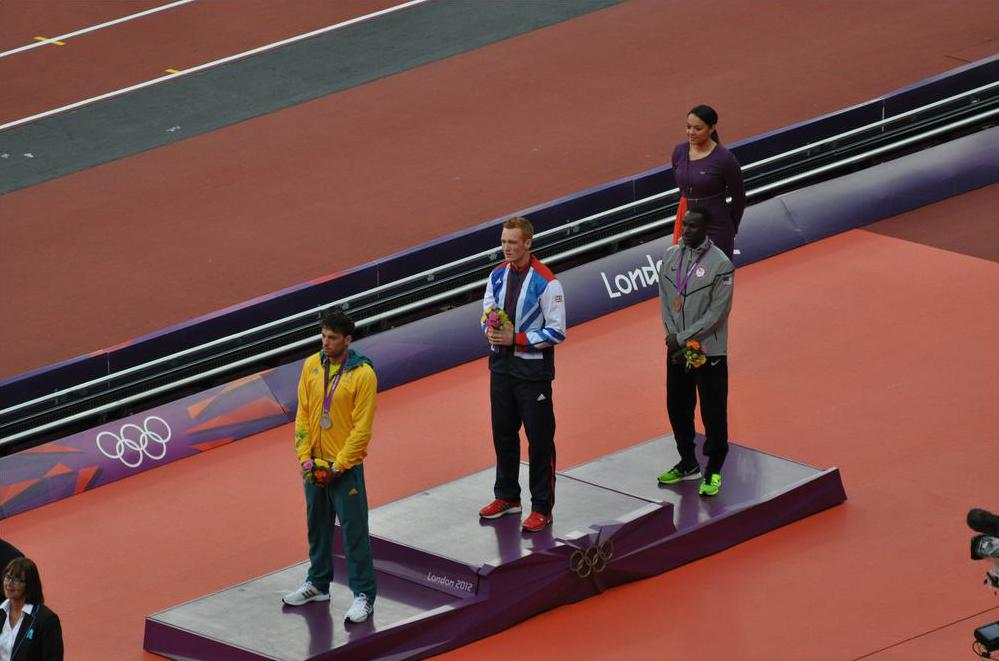
- Podium
- Venue: Olympic Stadium
- Date: 3–4 August
- Competitors: 42 from 30 nations
- Winning distance: 8.31

Medalists
1st place, gold medalist(s)		Greg Rutherford	Great Britain
2nd place, silver medalist(s)		Mitchell Watt	Australia
3rd place, bronze medalist(s)		Will Claye	United States

Official Video Highlights

The men's long jump competition at the 2012 Summer Olympics in London, United Kingdom was held at the Olympic Stadium on 3–4 August. Forty-two athletes from 30 nations competed. The event was won by 15 cm by Greg Rutherford of Great Britain, the nation's second gold medal in the men's long jump and first medal in the event since winning gold in 1964. Mitchell Watt won Australia's fourth silver in the event; Australia had never won gold. Will Claye returned the United States to the podium after a 2008 Games with no American finalists; it was still only the first time that the American team had failed to win the event in two consecutive Games.

== Summary ==
Only two athletes achieved automatic qualifying marks, both of those by Marquise Goodwin and Mauro Vinicius da Silva just one centimeter over the minimum at 8.11. The tight field was spread over less than 20 cm. It took a better second jump at 7.92 to make the final, leaving Russian junior and co-world leader Sergey Morgunov on the outside. Defending champion Irving Saladino was unable to get a legal jump in, failing to advance.

In the final, none of the top 3 qualifiers were to play a factor. Christopher Tomlinson took the lead in the first round with an 8.06 with Will Claye in second. In the second round, Greg Rutherford took the lead with an 8.21, while Claye jumped a centimeter better than Tomlinson, to hold on to second. Claye's mark was equaled by Michel Tornéus in the third round. The fourth round was when all but two of the finalists hit their best mark, Claye with 8.12 and Rutherford extending his lead to 8.31. Languishing in seventh to that point, Mitchell Watt did Claye one centimeter better in the fifth round, then improving another three centimeters on his final jump to solidify his hold on the silver medal.

Rutherford's gold medal was the second of three gold medals in one evening for the host country, their most successful day in Olympic history. Rutherford's winning jump of 8.31 was the shortest jump to win the Olympics men's long jump competition since the 1972 Summer Olympics.

== Background ==
This was the 27th appearance of the event, which is one of 12 athletics events to have been held at every Summer Olympics. The returning finalists from the 2008 Games were gold medalist Irving Saladino of Panama, silver medalist Khotso Mokoena of South Africa, fifth-place finisher Ndiss Kaba Badji of Senegal, sixth-place finisher Luis Felipe Méliz of Spain, seventh-place finisher Roman Novotný of the Czech Republic, eighth-place finisher Greg Rutherford of Great Britain, and Louis Tsatoumas of Greece, who had not made a legal mark in the final. Saladino had not had much success since Beijing, however. The two-time defending (and four-time overall) world champion, Dwight Phillips of the United States, had been injured in a car accident and did not compete. Mitchell Watt of Australia had come in second at the 2011 world championships, and in Phillips's absence Watt was a slight favorite over Rutherford.

Georgia and Iran each made their first appearance in the event. The United States appeared for the 26th time, most of any nation, having missed only the boycotted 1980 Games.

== Qualification ==
A National Olympic Committee (NOC) could enter up to 3 qualified athletes in the men's long jump event if all athletes met the A standard, or 1 athlete if they met the B standard. The maximum number of athletes per nation had been set at 3 since the 1930 Olympic Congress. The qualifying distance standards could be obtained in various meets during the qualifying period that had the approval of the IAAF. Both outdoor and indoor meets were eligible. The A standard for the 2012 men's long jump was 8.20 metres; the B standard was 8.10 metres. The qualifying period for was from 1 May 2011 to 8 July 2012. NOCs could also have an athlete enter the long jump through a universality place. NOCs could enter one male athlete in an athletics event, regardless of time, if they had no male athletes meeting the qualifying A or B standards in any men's athletic event.

== Competition format ==
The competition consisted of two rounds, qualification and final. In qualification, each athlete jumped three times (stopping early if they made the qualifying distance of 8.10 metres). At least the top twelve athletes moved on to the final; if more than twelve reached the qualifying distance, all who did so advanced. Distances were reset for the final round. Finalists jumped three times, after which the eight best jumped three more times (with the best distance of the six jumps counted).

== Records ==
Prior to the competition, the existing world and Olympic records, and season leading time, were as follows.

World record	Mike Powell (USA)	8.95	Tokyo, Japan	30 August 1991
Olympic record	Bob Beamon (USA)	8.90	Mexico City, Mexico	18 October 1968

2012 World leading	Greg Rutherford (GBR)	8.35	Chula Vista, United States	3 May 2012
2012 World leading	Sergey Morgunov (RUS)	8.35	Cheboksary, Russia	20 June 2012

No new world or Olympic records were set for this event.

== Schedule ==
All times are British Summer Time (UTC+1)

Date	Time	Round
Friday, 3 August 2012	19:50	Qualifying
Saturday, 4 August 2012	19:55	Final

== Results ==
=== Qualifying ===
Qualification rule: qualification standard 8.10m (Q) or at least best 12 qualified (q).

Rank	Group	Athlete	Nation	1	2	3	Result	Notes
1	B	Mauro Vinicius da Silva	Brazil	8.07	8.11	—	8.11	Q
2	A	Marquise Goodwin	United States	8.11	—	—	8.11	Q
3	A	Aleksandr Menkov	Russia	7.87	X	8.09	8.09	q
4	A	Greg Rutherford	Great Britain	8.08	8.06	—	8.08	q
5	B	Christopher Tomlinson	Great Britain	7.62	8.06	—	8.06	q
6	A	Michel Tornéus	Sweden	8.03	7.49	—	8.03	q
7	A	Godfrey Khotso Mokoena	South Africa	X	7.81	8.02	8.02	q
8	A	Will Claye	United States	7.99	X	7.86	7.99	q
9	B	Mitchell Watt	Australia	X	7.99	—	7.99	q
10	A	Tyrone Smith	Bermuda	7.73	7.75	7.97	7.97	q, SB
11	A	Henry Frayne	Australia	7.82	X	7.95	7.95	q
12	B	Sebastian Bayer	Germany	7.92	7.88	3.96	7.92	q
13	A	Christian Reif	Germany	7.81	X	7.92	7.92	
14	A	Eusebio Cáceres	Spain	7.25	7.92	6.95	7.92	
15	B	Aleksandr Petrov	Russia	7.67	7.57	7.89	7.89	
16	B	Sergey Morgunov	Russia	X	7.87	X	7.87	
17	A	Mohammad Arzandeh	Iran	7.77	7.75	7.84	7.84	
18	B	Ignisious Gaisah	Ghana	7.72	7.79	7.50	7.79	
19	A	Damar Forbes	Jamaica	7.79	X	7.48	7.79	
20	B	Li Jinzhe	China	7.59	7.67	7.77	7.77	
21	B	Raymond Higgs	Bahamas	X	7.76	X	7.76	
22	A	Alyn Camara	Germany	7.72	X	7.69	7.72	
23	A	Salim Sdiri	France	7.71	7.58	5.75	7.71	
24	B	Ndiss Kaba Badji	Senegal	7.66	X	7.64	7.66	
25	B	Arsen Sargsyan	Armenia	7.38	7.62	7.60	7.62	
26	B	Povilas Mykolaitis	Lithuania	X	X	7.61	7.61	
27	B	Stanley Gbagbeke	Nigeria	X	5.71	7.59	7.59	
28	B	Marcos Chuva	Portugal	X	7.55	7.06	7.55	
29	A	Loúis Tsátoumas	Greece	7.53	7.48	X	7.53	
30	A	Štepán Wagner	Czech Republic	7.39	7.50	7.47	7.50	
31	B	Viktor Kuznyetsov	Ukraine	7.43	X	7.50	7.50	
32	B	Luis Rivera	Mexico	7.42	X	7.29	7.42	
33	A	Lin Ching-hsuan	Chinese Taipei	7.38	7.35	X	7.38	
33	A	Supanara Sukhasvasti	Thailand	7.38	X	7.35	7.38	
35	A	Boleslav Skhirtladze	Georgia	7.26	6.95	6.90	7.26	
36	A	Zhang Xiaoyi	China	7.25	X	X	7.25	
37	B	Mohamed Fathalla Difallah	Egypt	X	7.08	X	7.08	
38	B	Roman Novotný	Czech Republic	X	6.96	X	6.96	
39	B	George Kitchens	United States	X	X	6.84	6.84	
40	A	Vardan Pahlevanyan	Armenia	X	6.55	X	6.55	
—	B	Luis Felipe Méliz	Spain	X	—	—	No mark	
—	B	Irving Saladino	Panama	X	X	X	No mark	

=== Final ===
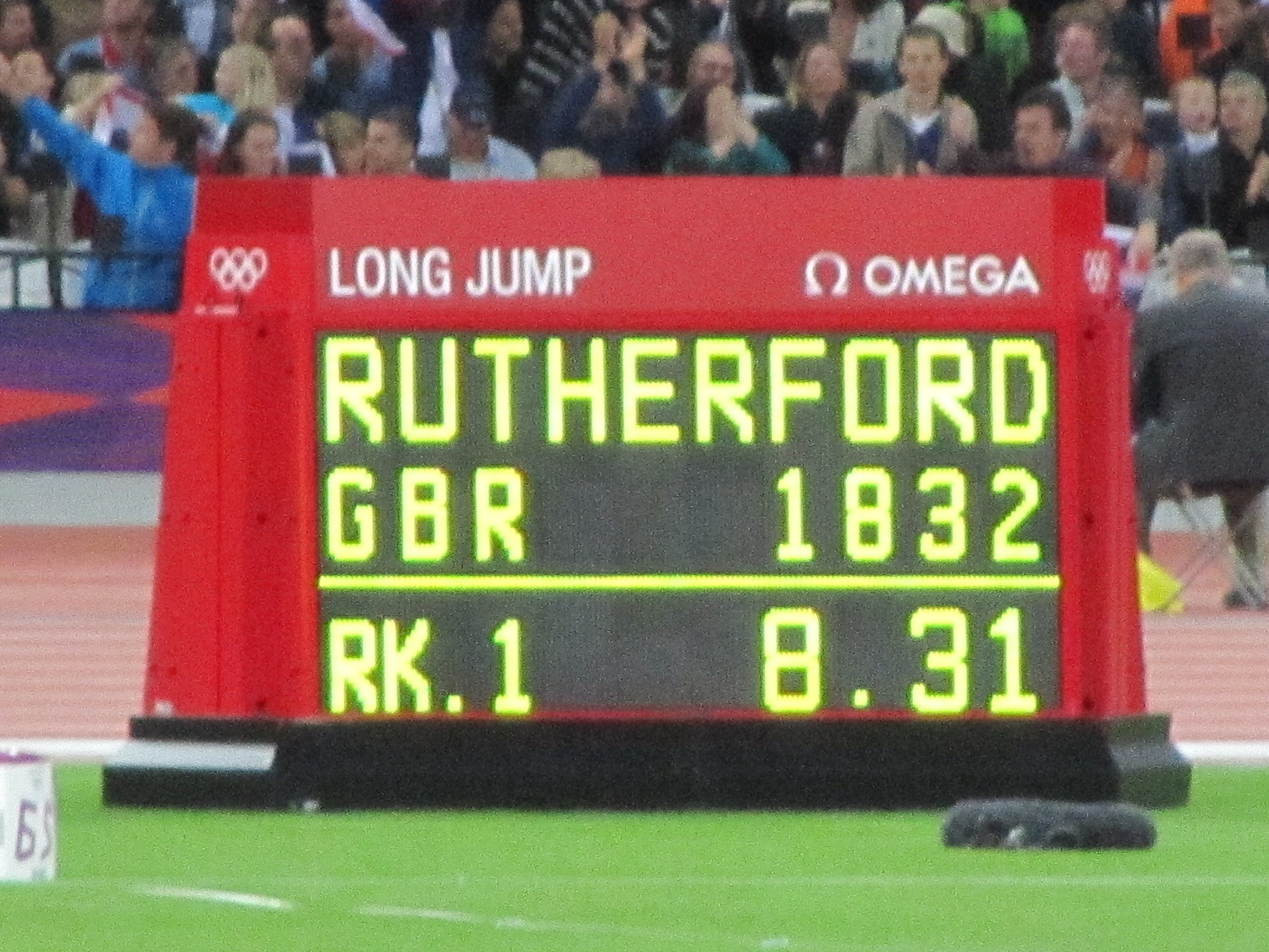

Rank	Athlete	Nation	1	2	3	4	5	6	Result
1st place, gold medalist(s)	Greg Rutherford	Great Britain	6.28	8.21	8.14	8.31	X	6.33	8.31
2nd place, silver medalist(s)	Mitchell Watt	Australia	X	7.97	X	X	8.13	8.16	8.16
3rd place, bronze medalist(s)	Will Claye	United States	7.98	8.07	7.93	8.12	7.96	X	8.12
4	Michel Tornéus	Sweden	7.63	7.80	8.07	8.11	8.07	7.98	8.11
5	Sebastian Bayer	Germany	7.87	X	7.96	8.10	7.96	7.98	8.10
6	Christopher Tomlinson	Great Britain	8.06	7.87	7.83	8.07	7.74	7.76	8.07
7	Mauro Vinicius da Silva	Brazil	X	X	7.96	8.01	X	X	8.01
8	Godfrey Khotso Mokoena	South Africa	7.93	X	7.62	X	X	X	7.93
9	Henry Frayne	Australia	7.85	X	7.63	Did not advance			7.85
10	Marquise Goodwin	United States	X	7.80	7.76	Did not advance			7.80
11	Aleksandr Menkov	Russia	X	X	7.78	Did not advance			7.78
12	Tyrone Smith	Bermuda	7.70	X	X	Did not advance			7.70
