= Aleksandr Petrov (long jumper) =

Russian long jumper

Aleksandr Petrov (born 9 August 1986 in Bryansk) is a Russian long jumper. He competed in the long jump event at the 2012 Summer Olympics.

== Competition record ==
Year	Competition	Venue	Position	Notes
Representing Russia
2007	European U23 Championships	Debrecen, Hungary	6th	7.77 m (wind: 0.7 m/s)
2007	Universiade	Bangkok, Thailand	23rd (q)	7.48 m
2009	European Indoor Championships	Turin, Italy	25th (q)	7.43 m
2012	European Championships	Helsinki, Finland	16th (q)	7.81 m
2012	Olympic Games	London, United Kingdom	15th (q)	7.89 m
2014	European Championships	Zürich, Switzerland	14th (q)	7.75 m
