= Andriy Makarchev =

Ukrainian long jumper

Andriy Makarchev (born 15 November 1985) is a Ukrainian long jumper.

He competed at the 2008 Olympic Games without reaching the final.

His personal best jump is 8.13 metres, achieved in June 2008 in Istanbul.

== Achievements ==
Year	Competition	Venue	Position	Notes
Representing Ukraine
2007	European U23 Championships	Debrecen, Hungary	5th	7.78 m (wind: 0.7 m/s)
2009	World Championships	Berlin, Germany	23rd	7.87 m
