= Julien Fivaz =

Swiss long jumper

Julien Fivaz (born 9 January 1979) is a Swiss long jumper. His personal best jump is 8.27 metres (NR), achieved in August 2003 in Ebensee.

He competed at the 2003 World Championships and the 2008 Olympic Games without reaching the final.

== Competition record ==
Year	Competition	Venue	Position	Notes
Representing Switzerland
2003	World Championships	Paris, France	32nd (q)	7.37 m
2005	Jeux de la Francophonie	Niamey, Niger	7th	7.32 m
2007	European Indoor Championships	Birmingham, United Kingdom	16th (q)	7.47 m
2008	Olympic Games	Beijing, China	36th (q)	7.53 m
2009	Jeux de la Francophonie	Beirut, Lebanon	3rd	7.76 m
