= Tõnis Sahk =

Estonian long jumper

Personal information
- Full name: Tõnis Sahk
- Born: 1 June 1983 (age 43)

Tõnis Sahk (born 1 June 1983) is an Estonian long jumper.

== Achievements ==
Year	Tournament	Venue	Position	Mark	Event
2010	European Championships	Barcelona, Spain	28th	7.46 m	Long jump
