= Roman Novotný =

Czech long jumper

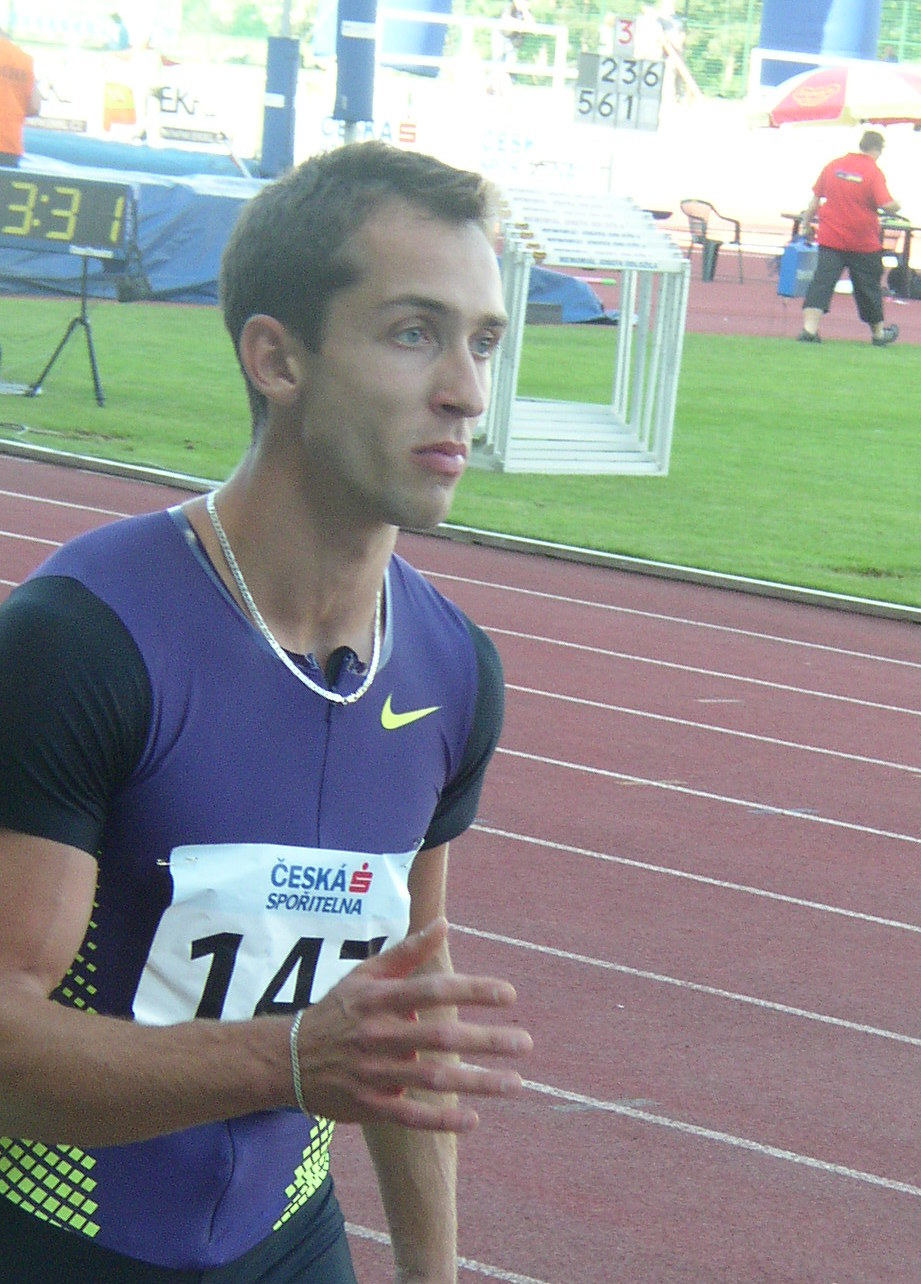
- Roman Novotný at the 2010 Josef Odložil Memorial in Prague

Personal information
- Born: January 5, 1986 (age 40)
- Height: 1.81 m (5 ft 11 1/2 in)
- Weight: 77 kg (170 lb)

Sport
- Country: Czech Republic
- Sport: Athletics
- Event: Long jump
- Updated on 15 August 2012

Roman Novotný (Czech pronunciation: [ˈroman ˈnovotniː]; born 5 January 1986) is a Czech long jumper.

He finished seventh at the 2003 World Youth Championships, won the silver medal at the 2007 Summer Universiade and finished eighth at the 2008 Olympic Games.

His personal best jump is 8.21 metres, achieved in July 2008 in Brno.

== Competition record ==
Year	Competition	Venue	Position	Notes
Representing Czech Republic
2007	European U23 Championships	Debrecen, Hungary	3rd	7.87 m (wind: 0.4 m/s)
2007	Universiade	Bangkok, Thailand	3rd	7.88 m
2008	Olympic Games	Beijing, China	8th	8.00 m
2009	European Indoor Championships	Turin, Italy	13th (q)	7.77 m
2009	World Championships	Berlin, Germany	26th	7.86 m
2010	European Championships	Barcelona, Spain	12th	7.65 m
2011	European Indoor Championships	Paris, France	8th	7.66 m
2012	European Championships	Helsinki, Finland	19th (q)	7.80 m
2012	Olympic Games	London, United Kingdom	38th (q)	6.96 m
