= Sebastian Bayer =

German long jumper (born 1986)

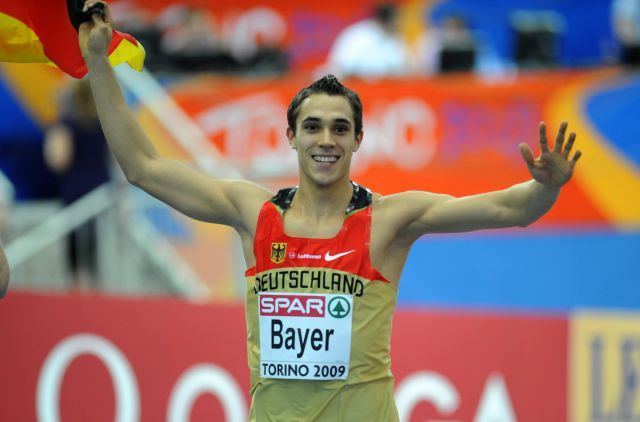

Personal information
- Born: 11 June 1986 (age 40) Aachen, West Germany
- Height: 1.89 m (6 ft 2 in)
- Weight: 79 kg (174 lb)

Sport
- Country: Germany
- Sport: Athletics
- Event: Long jump
Medal record
European Championships
Gold medal – first place	2012 Helsinki	Long jump
European Indoor Championships
Gold medal – first place	2009 Turin	Long jump
Gold medal – first place	2011 Paris	Long jump
European Junior Championships
Silver medal – second place	2005 Kaunas	Long jump
- Updated on 15 August 2012

Sebastian Bayer (born 11 June 1986) is a German long jumper best known for having history's second longest indoor long jump.

== Biography ==
Bayer was born on 11 June 1986 in Aachen, West Germany. He won the silver medal at the 2005 European Junior Championships. He also competed at the 2006 European Championships and the 2008 Olympic Games without reaching the final.

On 8 March 2009 at the European Indoor Track and Field Championships in Turin, Italy, Bayer long jumped 8.71 m (28 ft 7 in) to win the gold medal. This is the second longest indoor long jump in history, behind Carl Lewis' 8.79 m (28 ft 10 in) world indoor record set on 27 January 1984 at the Millrose Games in New York City, United States. Bayer's jump also bested the European indoor record, formerly held by Yago Lamela from Spain, by 15 centimetres (6 in). His result is the best by any German, as it is further than the German national outdoor record of 8.54 m (28 ft 1/4 in) set at the 1980 Summer Olympic games in Moscow by Lutz Dombrowski. Prior to this meet Bayer's personal record was 8.17 m (26 ft 9 3/4 in).

== Competition record ==
Year	Competition	Venue	Position	Notes
Representing Germany
2004	World Junior Championships	Grosseto, Italy	17th (q)	7.27 m (wind: +0.1 m/s)
2005	European Junior Championships	Kaunas, Lithuania	2nd	7.73 m
2006	European Championships	Gothenburg, Sweden	20th (q)	7.66 m
2008	Olympic Games	Beijing, China	23rd (q)	7.77 m
2009	European Indoor Championships	Turin, Italy	1st	8.71 m (AR)
2009	World Championships	Berlin, Germany	19th (q)	7.98 m
2011	European Indoor Championships	Paris, France	1st	8.16 m
2011	World Championships	Daegu, South Korea	8th	8.17 m
2012	European Championships	Helsinki, Finland	1st	8.34 m
2012	Olympic Games	London, United Kingdom	5th	8.10 m
2013	European Indoor Championships	Gothenburg, Sweden	9th (q)	7.91 m
2013	World Championships	Moscow, Russia	9th	7.98 m
2014	European Championships	Zurich, Switzerland	23rd (q)	7.56 m

== Personal bests ==
Event	Best (m)	Wind	Venue	Date	Note(s)
Long jump (outdoor)	8.49 m	1.6 m/s	Ulm, Germany	4 July 2009	
Long jump (indoor)	8.71 m	N/A	Turin, Italy	8 March 2009	ER, NR

Key: ER = European record, NR = National record

Last updated 15 September 2010.

== See also ==
- List of European records in athletics

Records
Preceded by Yago Lamela	Men's Long Jump European Indoor Record Holder; 8 March 2009 –	Succeeded by Incumbent
