= Kafétien Gomis =

French long jumper (born 1980)

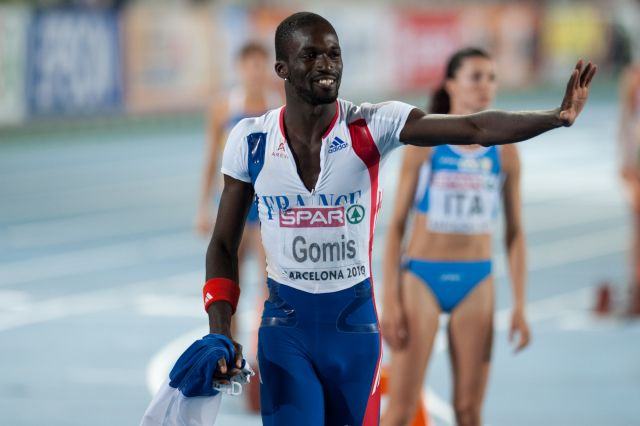
- Gomis at the 2010 European Championships

Personal information
- Born: 23 March 1980 (age 46) Saint-Quentin, Aisne, France
- Height: 185 cm (6 ft 1 in)
- Weight: 70 kg (154 lb)

Sport
- Country: France
- Sport: Athletics
- Club: Lille Métropole Athlétisme
- Coached by: Renaud Longuèvre
Medal record
Men's athletics
Representing France
European Championships
Silver medal – second place	2010 Barcelona	Long jump
Bronze medal – third place	2014 Zürich	Long jump
European Indoor Championships
Silver medal – second place	2011 Paris	Long jump
Continental Cup
Silver medal – second place	2010 Split	Long jump

Kafétien Gomis (born 23 March 1980 in Saint-Quentin, Aisne) is a French long jumper. His personal best jump is 8.24 metres, achieved in August 2010.

He finished ninth at the 2003 Summer Universiade, seventh at the 2005 Summer Universiade, fifth at the 2006 European Athletics Championships and fourth at the 2007 European Athletics Indoor Championships. He also competed in the 2004 Olympics, but failed to qualify from his qualification pool.

He came fourth at the 2009 European Athletics Indoor Championships with an indoor personal best of 8.12 metres and he represented France later that year at the 2009 World Championships in Athletics (although he did not make the final). He was knocked out in the qualification round at the 2010 IAAF World Indoor Championships but he excelled outdoors that season, jumping a best of 8.24 m to win the silver medal at the 2010 European Athletics Championships – his first major medal.

== Personal bests ==
Event	Best (m)	Venue	Date
Long jump (outdoor)	8.24	Barcelona, Spain	1 August 2010
Long jump (indoor)	8.21	Paris, France	27 February 2010

- All information taken from IAAF profile.

== Achievements ==
Year	Competition	Venue	Position	Notes
Representing France
2003	Universiade	Daegu, South Korea	9th	7.74 m
2004	Olympic Games	Athens, Greece	14th (q)	7.99 m
2005	Mediterranean Games	Almería, Spain	6th	7.88 m
2005	Universiade	İzmir, Turkey	7th	7.47 m
2006	European Championships	Gothenburg, Sweden	5th	7.93 m
2007	European Indoor Championships	Birmingham, United Kingdom	4th	7.93 m
2009	European Indoor Championships	Turin, Italy	4th	8.12 m
2009	Mediterranean Games	Pescara, Italy	4th	7.96 m
2009	World Championships	Berlin, Germany	21st (q)	7.90 m
2010	World Indoor Championships	Doha, Qatar	10th (q)	7.84 m
2010	European Championships	Barcelona, Spain	2nd	8.24 m
2011	European Indoor Championships	Paris, France	2nd	8.03 m
2012	European Championships	Helsinki, Finland	9th	7.88 m
2013	Jeux de la Francophonie	Nice, France	2nd	7.81 m
2014	European Championships	Zürich, Switzerland	3rd	8.14 m
2015	European Indoor Championships	Prague, Czech Republic	14th (q)	7.65 m
2015	World Championships	Beijing, China	7th	8.02 m
2016	World Indoor Championships	Portland, United States	9th	7.88 m
2016	European Championships	Amsterdam, Netherlands	7th	7.84 m
2016	Olympic Games	Rio de Janeiro, Brazil	8th	8.05 m
2018	European Championships	Berlin, Germany	9th	7.84 m
