= Luis Felipe Méliz =

Spanish long jumper (born 1979)

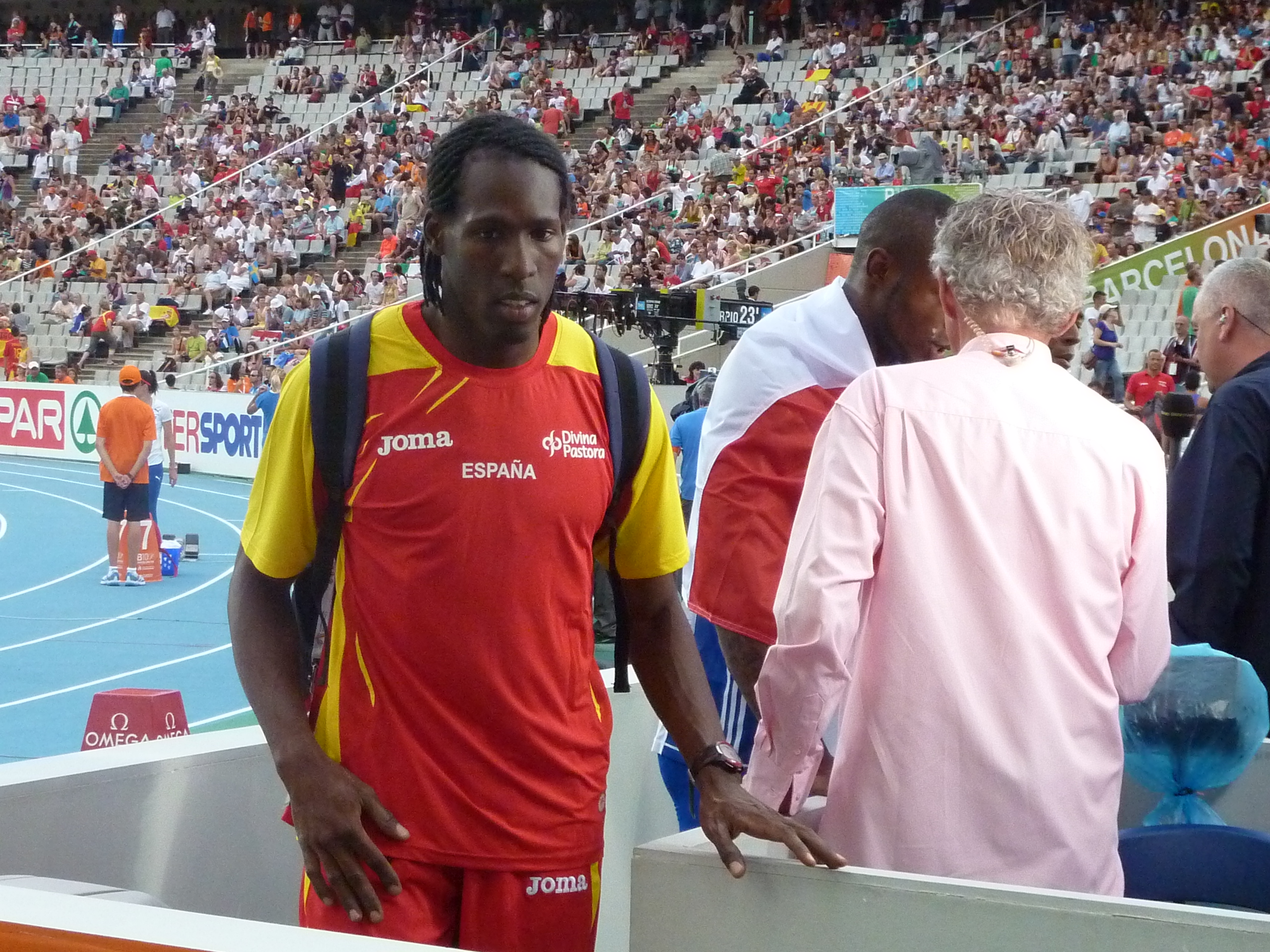
- Méliz in 2010

Personal information
- Full name: Luis Felipe Méliz Linares
- Nationality: Cuban, Spanish
- Born: 11 August 1979 (age 47) Santa Clara, Villa Clara, Cuba
- Height: 1.82 m (6 ft 0 in)
- Weight: 78 kg (172 lb)

Sport
- Country: Cuba, Spain
- Sport: Athletics
- Event: Long jump
Medal record
Representing Spain
European Championships
Silver medal – second place	2012 Helsinki	Long jump
Representing Cuba
Summer Universiade
Silver medal – second place	1999 Palma de Mallorca	Long jump
Pan American Games
Silver medal – second place	2003 Santo Domingo	Long jump
Bronze medal – third place	1999 Winnipeg	Long jump
World Junior Championships
Bronze medal – third place	1998 Annecy	Long jump
- Updated on 15 August 2012

Luis Felipe Méliz Linares (born 11 August 1979) is a long jumper. Born in Cuba, he represents Spain internationally. He previously competed for his country of birth.

Méliz 's personal best is 8.43 metres, achieved in June 2000 in Jena.

== Achievements ==
Year	Competition	Venue	Position	Notes
Representing Cuba
1998	Ibero-American Championships	Lisbon, Portugal	5th	7.73 m
1998	World Junior Championships	Annecy, France	3rd	7.91 m (wind: +0.6 m/s)
1999	Universiade	Palma de Mallorca, Spain	2nd	8.05 m
1999	Pan American Games	Winnipeg, Canada	3rd	8.06 m
1999	World Championships	Seville, Spain	18th (q)	7.85 m
2000	Olympic Games	Sydney, Australia	7th	8.08 m
2001	World Indoor Championships	Lisbon, Portugal	9th	7.69 m
2001	World Championships	Edmonton, Canada	17th (q)	7.69 m
2001	Goodwill Games	Brisbane, Australia	5th	7.88 m
2003	World Indoor Championships	Birmingham, United Kingdom	4th	8.01 m
2003	Pan American Games	Santo Domingo, Dominican Republic	2nd	8.20 m
2003	World Championships	Paris, France	11th	7.73 m
2004	World Indoor Championships	Budapest, Hungary	17th (q)	7.71 m
2004	Ibero-American Championships	Huelva, Spain	11th	6.60 m
Representing Spain
2008	Olympic Games	Beijing, China	7th	8.07 m
2009	World Championships	Berlin, Germany	25th (q)	7.87 m
2010	European Championships	Barcelona, Spain	11th	7.90 m
2011	European Indoor Championships	Paris, France	6th	7.90 m
2011	World Championships	Daegu, South Korea	23rd (q)	7.82 m
2012	World Indoor Championships	Istanbul, Turkey	8th	7.50 m
2012	European Championships	Helsinki, Finland	2nd	8.21 m
2012	Olympic Games	London, United Kingdom	–	NM
2014	Ibero-American Championships	São Paulo, Brazil	3rd	7.76 m
2014	European Championships	Zürich, Switzerland	28th (q)	6.85 m
