= 2007 European Athletics U23 Championships – Men's long jump =

The men's long jump event at the 2007 European Athletics U23 Championships was held in Debrecen, Hungary, at Gyulai István Atlétikai Stadion on 12 and 13 July.

== Medalists ==
Gold	Michał Rosiak; Poland
Silver	Petteri Lax; Finland
Bronze	Roman Novotný; Czech Republic

== Results ==
=== Final ===
13 July

Rank	Name	Nationality	Attempts						Result	Notes
Rank	Name	Nationality	1	2	3	4	5	6	Result	Notes
1st place, gold medalist(s)	Michał Rosiak	Poland	7.67 (w: 1.3 m/s)	7.59 (w: 1.0 m/s)	7.94 (w: 0.8 m/s)	7.71 (w: -0.2 m/s)	7.67 (w: -0.2 m/s)	x	7.94 (w: 0.8 m/s)	
2nd place, silver medalist(s)	Petteri Lax	Finland	x	7.49 (w: +0.8 m/s)	7.89 (w: 0.2 m/s)	x	x	7.72 (w: -0.1 m/s)	7.89 (w: 0.2 m/s)	
3rd place, bronze medalist(s)	Roman Novotný	Czech Republic	7.34 (w: 1.2 m/s)	7.77 (w: 0.6 m/s)	7.87 (w: 0.4 m/s)	7.87 (w: -0.3 m/s)	7.70 (w: 0.0 m/s)	7.72 (w: -0.2 m/s)	7.87 (w: 0.4 m/s)	
4	Andrejs Maškancevs	Latvia	7.62 (w: 1.2 m/s)	7.27 (w: 0.3 m/s)	7.85 (w: 1.0 m/s)	7.81 (w: -0.3 m/s)	7.80 (w: -0.2 m/s)	7.86 (w: -0.1 m/s)	7.86 (w: -0.1 m/s)	
5	Andriy Makarchev	Ukraine	x	7.78 (w: 0.7 m/s)	x	7.30 (w: -0.6 m/s)	x	7.25 (w: -0.2 m/s)	7.78 (w: 0.7 m/s)	
6	Aleksandr Petrov	Russia	7.50 (w: 0.7 m/s)	7.75 (w: 1.3 m/s)	7.77 (w: 0.7 m/s)	7.68 (w: -0.5 m/s)	x	7.55 (w: -0.3 m/s)	7.77 (w: 0.7 m/s)	
7	Dmytro Bilotserkivskyy	Ukraine	x	7.72 (w: 1.6 m/s)	7.65 (w: 0.6 m/s)	7.20 (w: -0.3 m/s)	7.25 (w: -0.3 m/s)	x	7.72 (w: 1.6 m/s)	
8	Lucas Jakubczyk	Germany	7.47 (w: 1.0 m/s)	7.50 (w: 0.3 m/s)	7.69 (w: 0.8 m/s)	7.52 (w: 0.1 m/s)	7.24 (w: 0.0 m/s)	7.53 (w: -0.1 m/s)	7.69 (w: 0.8 m/s)	
9	Nikolaos Filandarakis	Greece	x	7.49 (w: 0.6 m/s)	7.58 (w: 0.4 m/s)				7.58 (w: 0.4 m/s)	
10	Michel Tornéus	Sweden	7.53 (w: 1.6 m/s)	x	7.51 (w: 1.2 m/s)				7.53 (w: 1.6 m/s)	
11	Claudiu Bujin	Romania	7.48 (w: 0.6 m/s)	7.48 (w: 0.7 m/s)	7.52 (w: 0.5 m/s)				7.52 (w: 0.5 m/s)	
	Jonathan Martínez	Spain	x	x	x				NM	

=== Qualifications ===
12 July
Qualifying perf. 7.65 or 12 best to the Final

Rank	Name	Nationality	Result	Notes
1	Petteri Lax	Finland	7.69 (w: 0.9 m/s)	Q
2	Roman Novotný	Czech Republic	7.69 (w: -0.6 m/s)	Q
3	Andrejs Maškancevs	Latvia	7.66 (w: 0.0 m/s)	Q
4	Andriy Makarchev	Ukraine	7.60 (w: 0.1 m/s)	q
5	Michał Rosiak	Poland	7.59 (w: 0.6 m/s)	q
6	Aleksandr Petrov	Russia	7.58 (w: 0.0 m/s)	q
7	Lucas Jakubczyk	Germany	7.57 (w: 0.2 m/s)	q
8	Claudiu Bujin	Romania	7.55 (w: -0.3 m/s)	q
9	Jonathan Martínez	Spain	7.52 (w: -1.2 m/s)	q
10	Dmytro Bilotserkivskyy	Ukraine	7.51 (w: -1.0 m/s)	q
11	Michel Tornéus	Sweden	7.51 (w: -0.3 m/s)	q
12	Nikolaos Filandarakis	Greece	7.46 (w: 0.8 m/s)	q
13	JJ Jegede	United Kingdom	7.42 (w: 0.2 m/s)	
14	Adrian Vasile	Romania	7.28 (w: 0.5 m/s)	
15	Anatoliy Minenko	Israel	7.18 (w: 0.4 m/s)	
16	Chris Kirk	United Kingdom	7.08 (w: 0.3 m/s)	
17	Marek Mikita	Poland	7.03 (w: -0.4 m/s)	
18	Remigius Roskosch	Germany	7.00 (w: 0.4 m/s)	
19	Stefano Tremigliozzi	Italy	6.71 (w: -0.6 m/s)	
20	Federico Gorrieri	San Marino	6.49 (w: 0.7 m/s)	

== Participation ==
According to an unofficial count, 20 athletes from 15 countries participated in the event.

- Czech Republic (1)
- Finland (1)
- Germany (2)
- Greece (1)
- Israel (1)
- Italy (1)
- Latvia (1)
- Poland (2)
- Romania (2)
- Russia (1)
- San Marino (1)
- Spain (1)
- Sweden (1)
- Ukraine (2)
- United Kingdom (2)
