= Michel Tornéus =

Swedish long jumper

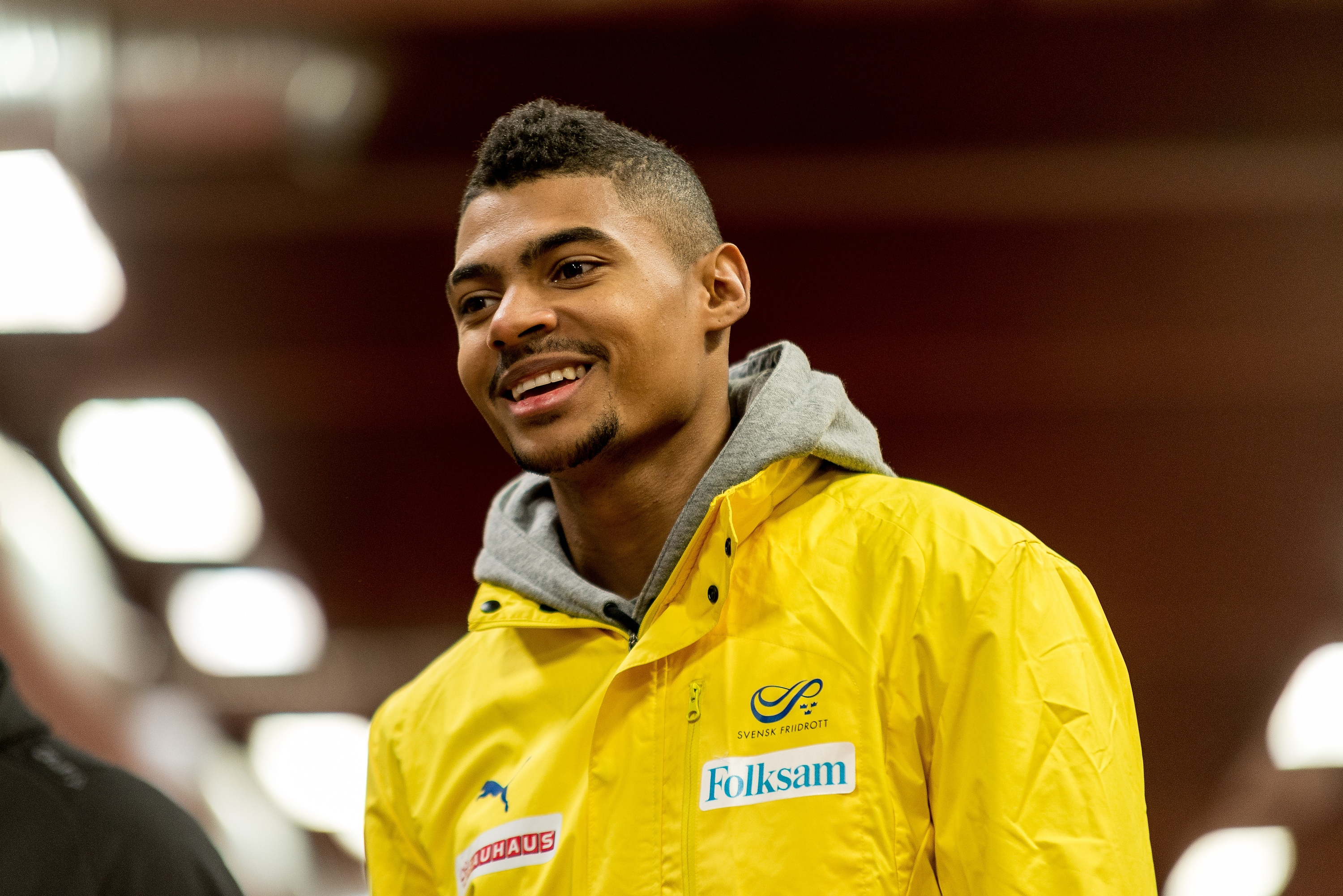
- Tornéus in 2013

Personal information
- Nationality: Swedish
- Born: 26 May 1986 (age 40) Botkyrka, Sweden
- Height: 1.84 m (6 ft 0 in)
- Weight: 72 kg (159 lb)

Sport
- Event: Long jump
- Club: Hammarby IF Friidrott
- Coached by: Oscar Gidewall

Achievements and titles
- Personal bests: 8.44 m NR; 8.30 m (indoors)
Medal record
Men's athletics
Representing Sweden
World Indoor Championships
Bronze medal – third place	2014 Sopot	Long jump
European Championships
Silver medal – second place	2016 Amsterdam	Long jump
Bronze medal – third place	2012 Helsinki	Long jump
European Indoor Championships
Gold medal – first place	2015 Prague	Long jump
Silver medal – second place	2013 Gothenburg	Long jump
Silver medal – second place	2017 Belgrade	Long jump

Michel Tresor Komesha Tornéus (born 26 May 1986) is a Swedish former long jumper.

== Biography ==
He competed at the 2009 European Indoor Championships, the 2009 World Championships and the 2010 World Indoor Championships without reaching the final.

He made a name for himself in 2005 at 19 years of age when he jumped 7.94 meters, just 1 cm short of the Swedish junior record. He set a personal best jump of 8.11 metres in June 2009 at Ullevi.

He was first in the long jump for Sweden in the 2010 European Team Championships First League section and went on to finish ninth in the event final at the 2010 European Athletics Championships. He started his 2011 indoor season in strong form, taking four straight wins, including a personal best of 8.13 m to win in front of a home crowd at the XL Galan.

He won his first senior medal in 2012, a bronze at the 2012 European Athletics Championships in Helsinki. He then finished one centimetre behind a medal in the long jump at the 2012 Summer Olympics.

He began 2013 in fine form breaking the Swedish indoor long jump record. He competed at the 2013 European Athletics Indoor Championships on home soil in Gothenburg, jumping a new national record of 8.27 metres in the first round, before jumping 8.29 metres in the final round, only two centimetres behind winner Aleksandr Menkov.

At the 2015 European Athletics Indoor Championships Tornéus won his first international gold medal, after beating the Swedish indoor record in the final.

At the 2017 World Championships in Athletics held in London, he obtained the 8th place in the men's long jump event, clearing 8.18 metres.

Tornéus retired in 2019.

== Personal life ==
His father was born in Democratic Republic of Congo and his mother is from the Finnish (Meänkieli) speaking region of Torne Valley in Sweden. Tornéus' original athletics club is the Tullinge-Tumba finska förening (Finnish association of Tullinge-Tumba) track and field program.

== Achievements ==
Year	Competition	Venue	Position	Notes
Representing Sweden
2005	European Junior Championships	Kaunas, Lithuania	4th	7.63 m
2007	European U23 Championships	Debrecen, Hungary	10th	7.53 m
2009	European Indoor Championships	Turin, Italy	17th (q)	7.58 m
2009	World Championships	Berlin, Germany	28th (q)	7.78 m
2010	World Indoor Championships	Doha, Qatar	16th (q)	7.71 m
2010	European Championships	Barcelona, Spain	9th	7.92 m
2011	European Indoor Championships	Paris, France	7th	7.84 m
2011	European Team Championships	Stockholm, Sweden	2nd	8.19 m
2011	World Championships	Daegu, South Korea	27th (q)	7.65 m
2012	World Indoor Championships	Istanbul, Turkey	9th (q)	7.85 m
2012	European Championships	Helsinki, Finland	3rd	8.17 m
2012	Olympic Games	London, United Kingdom	4th	8.11 m
2013	European Indoor Championships	Gothenburg, Sweden	2nd	8.29 m
2013	World Championships	Moscow, Russia	19th (q)	7.75 m
2014	World Indoor Championships	Sopot, Poland	3rd	8.21 m
2014	European Championships	Zurich, Switzerland	5th	8.09 m
2015	European Indoor Championships	Prague, Czech Republic	1st	8.30 m
2015	World Championships	Beijing, China	—	NM
2016	European Championships	Amsterdam, Netherlands	2nd	8.21 m (w)
2016	Olympic Games	Rio de Janeiro, Brazil	26th (q)	7.65 m
2017	European Indoor Championships	Belgrade, Serbia	2nd	8.08 m
2017	World Championships	London, United Kingdom	8th	8.18 m
2018	European Championships	Berlin, Germany	7th	7.86 m
