= Andrew Howe =

Italian long jumper

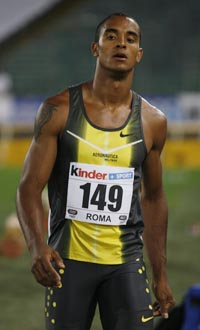
- Howe in 2007 at 22.

Personal information
- National team: Italy: 17 caps (2005-2020)
- Born: May 12, 1985 (age 41) Los Angeles, United States
- Height: 1.84 m (6 ft 0 in)
- Weight: 73 kg (161 lb)

Sport
- Sport: Athletics
- Event(s): Sprint; Long jump
- Club: C.S. Aeronautica Militare
- Coached by: René Felton (2005-2014); Yannick Tregaro (2015-2016); Fabrizio Donato (2017-2018); Maria Chiara Milardi (2019-2020); Stefano Serranò (2021- )

Achievements and titles
- Personal bests: 100 m: 10.27 (2006); 200 m: 20.28 (2004); 400 m: 45.70 (2011); Long jump: 8.47 m (2007)
Medal record
Men's athletics
Representing Italy
Senior level
Event	1st	2nd	3rd
World Championships	0	1	0
World Indoor Championships	0	0	1
European Championships	1	0	0
European Indoor Championships	1	0	0
Continental Cup	0	1	0
European Cup (Super League)	1	0	1
Total	3	2	2
World Championships
Silver medal – second place	2007 Osaka	Long jump
World Indoor Championships
Bronze medal – third place	2006 Moscow	Long jump
European Championships
Gold medal – first place	2006 Gothenburg	Long jump
European Indoor Championships
Gold medal – first place	2007 Birmingham	Long jump
Youth level
Event	1st	2nd	3rd
World U20 Championships	2	0	0
World U18 Championships	0	0	1
Gymnasiade	2	0	0
Total	4	0	1

Andrew Howe (born 12 May 1985) is an American-born Italian athlete who specializes in the long jump and sprinting. He won this event as well as the 200 metres at the 2004 World Junior Championships. He was successful at senior level at a young age, winning a long jump bronze at the 2006 IAAF World Indoor Championships before becoming the European Champion later that year. In 2007 he became the European Indoor Champion and won the silver medal at the 2007 World Championships in Athletics.

A combination of injuries ruled him out for most of the 2008 and 2009 seasons. He returned to action in 2010 and became the Italian champion, representing his country at the 2010 European Athletics Championships.

== Biography ==
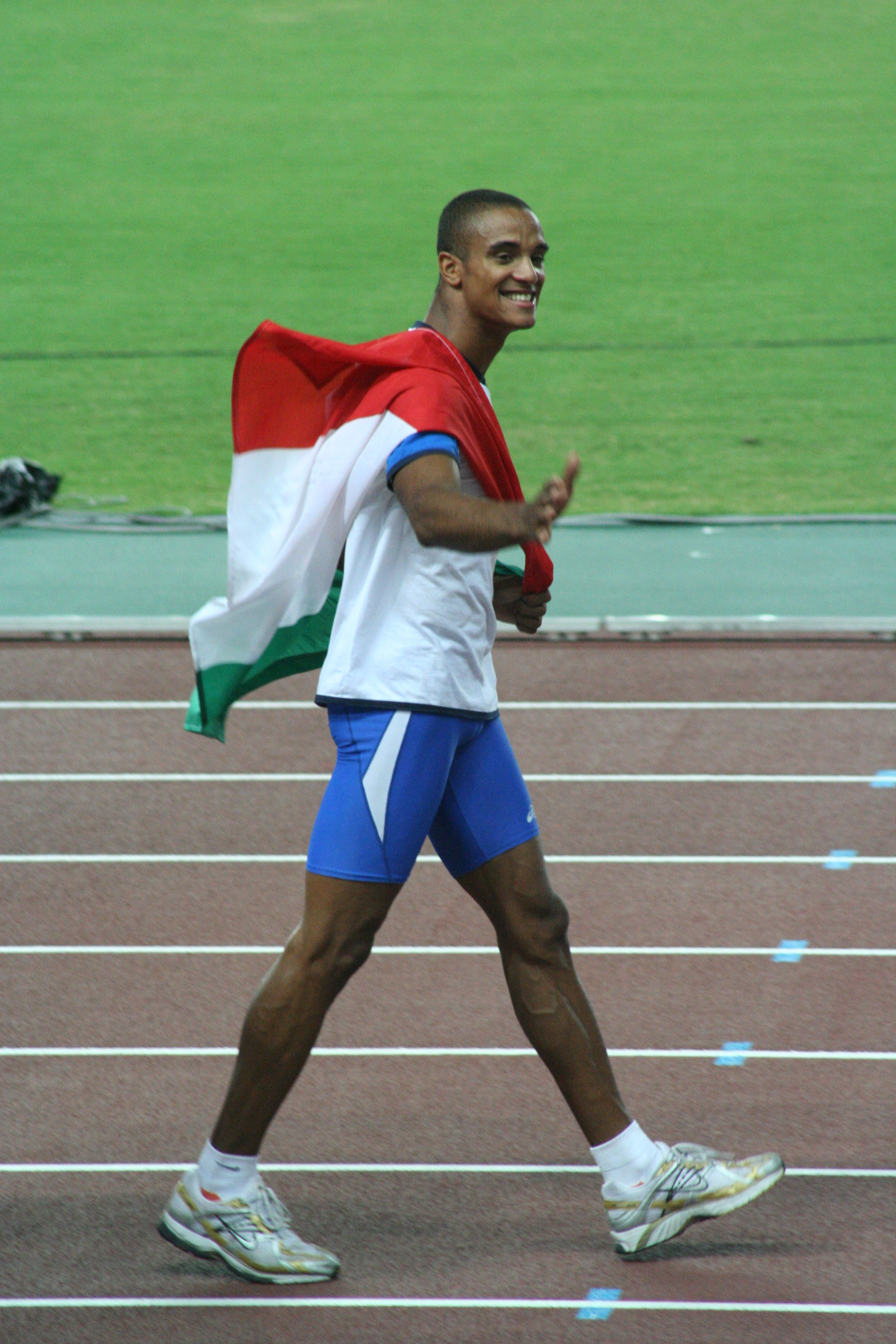
Howe celebrating his silver medal at the 2007 World Athletics Championships.

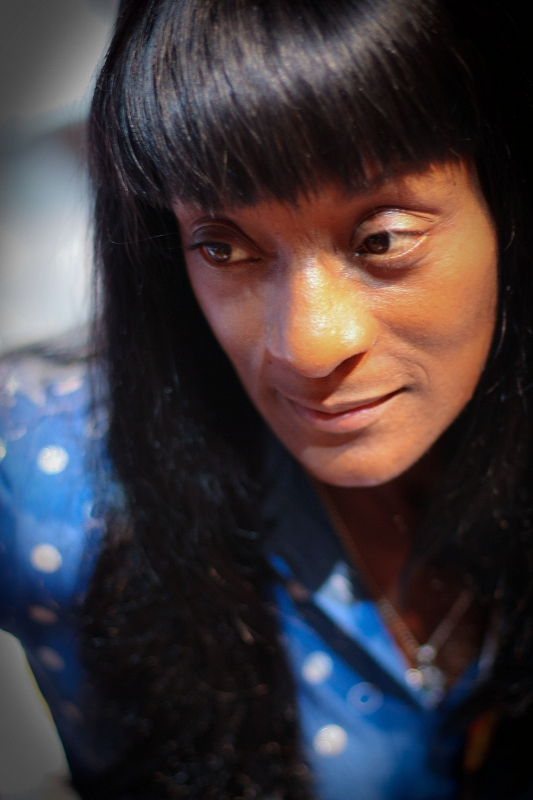
Howe's mother René Felton coached her son from youth level to 2014.

Howe was born in Los Angeles, United States, to Andrew Howe Sr and René Felton, an American hurdler who is a former United States Junior College National Record in the 100 meter hurdles in Europe and continued participating in Athletics at the Master Level winning Silver Medal 2001 European Indoor Championships 60 Meter hurdles. In 1992, Howe moved to Rieti, Italy with his mother after she divorced Howe Sr and remarried Italian Ugo Besozzi.

Coached by his mother, his international breakthrough came with the double gold medal in the men's long jump and 200 Meters at 2004 IAAF Junior World Championship in Grosseto, Italy 2006 World Indoor Championships, where he finished third. Later the same year he won the gold medal at the European Championships.

In the 2007 European Athletics Indoor Championships, he won gold with a fifth round leap of 8.30, after trailing his Greek competitor, and eventual silver medalist, Loúis Tsátoumas in the first four jumps.

In the 2007 World Championships, he won the silver medal with a sixth jump of 8.47, achieving the Italian national record and his personal best. He was only surpassed by Irving Saladino at his last jump with 8.57 m. He brought the year to a close with a win at the 2007 IAAF World Athletics Final, becoming the first Italian to win at the competition and only the second to win an event at an IAAF season-end contest. He was given the first European Athletics Rising Star Award in recognition of his achievements that season.

Following this, his 2008 season was blighted by a shoulder injury and then hamstring problems, and he did not make it past the qualifiers of the long jump at the 2008 Summer Olympics. The next season held further physical problems for the Italian and surgery on his Achilles tendon ruled him out for the year.

He returned to action in July 2010 with a win in the long jump at the Italian Athletics Championships. He attempted to defend his continental title at the 2010 European Athletics Championships, but his jump of 8.12 m brought him fifth place and Christian Reif succeeded him to the European title. Nearing the end of the season, Howe ran in the 200 m at the Notturna di Milano – marking a return to an event in which he had competed sparely. In a return to form, he won the race and although he eased up in the final metres he recorded a time of 20.30 seconds – two hundredths away from his long-standing personal best.

He completed his winter training in Qatar and at the University of California, Los Angeles. At the start of the outdoor season he ran a personal best and European-leading time of 45.70 seconds over 400 metres and then took a surprise win over 200 m at the Golden Gala in Rome with a run of 20.31 seconds (also a season's best for Europe).

Italian Olympic gold medal sprinter Lamont Marcell Jacobs said that when he was growing up, Howe, who is also mixed-race and half-American, was his idol.

== National records ==
- Long jump: 8.47 m (Osaka, 30 August 2007) - Current holder
- Long jump indoor: 8.30 m (Birmingham, 4 March 2007) - Current holder
- Mixed 4 × 400 metres relay: 3:16.15 (Yokohama, 11 May 2019) with Re, Trevisan, Lukudo - Current holder

== Achievements ==
Youth

Year	Competition	Venue	Rank	Event	Performance	Notes
2001	World Youth Championships	(Hungary) Debrecen	3rd	Long jump	7.61 m	
2002	World Junior Championships	(Jamaica) Kingston	5th	4 × 100 m relay	39.86	
2004	World Junior Championships	(Italy) Grosseto	1st	200 m	20.28 s	(+0.1 m/s)
2004	World Junior Championships	(Italy) Grosseto	1st	Long jump	8.11 m	(+0.9 m/s)

Senior

Year	Competition	Venue	Rank	Event	Performance	Notes
2006	World Indoor Championships	(Russia) Moscow	3rd	Long jump	8.19 m	
2006	European Championships	(Sweden) Gothenburg	1st	Long jump	8.20 m	
2007	European Indoor Championships	(United Kingdom) Birmingham	1st	Long jump	8.30 m	
2007	World Championships	(Japan) Osaka	2nd	Long jump	8.47 m	
2010	European Championships	(Colombia) Barcelona	5th	Long jump	8.12 m	
2017	European Indoor Championships	(Serbia) Belgrade	10th (q)	Long jump	7.71 m	
2018	European Championships	(Germany) Berlin	17th (sf)	200 m	20.78	
2019	World Athletics Relays	(Japan) Yokohama	4th	4 × 400 m relay	3:16.12	NR (heat)

== National titles ==
Howe won seven national championships at individual senior level.

- Italian Athletics Championships
  - 200 m: 2007, 2011, 2012 (3)
  - Long jump: 2007, 2010 (2)
- Italian Indoor Athletics Championships
  - Long jump: 2006, 2007 (2)

== See also ==
- FIDAL Hall of Fame
- Men's long jump Italian record progression
- Italian all-time lists - Long jump
- Italian all-time lists - 200 metres
- Italy national relay team
