= Vardan Pahlevanyan =

Armenian long jumper

Personal information
- Born: 27 February 1988 (age 38)
- Height: 1.92 m (6 ft 3 1/2 in)
- Weight: 82 kg (181 lb)

Sport
- Country: Armenia
- Sport: Athletics
- Event: Long jump
- Updated on 9 August 2012

Vardan Pahlevanyan (Armenian: Վարդան Փահլևանյան, born 27 February 1988 in Yerevan, Armenian SSR) is an Armenian long jumper. He competed at the 2012 Summer Olympics in the men's long jump.
