= Louis Tsatoumas =

Greek long jumper (born 1982)

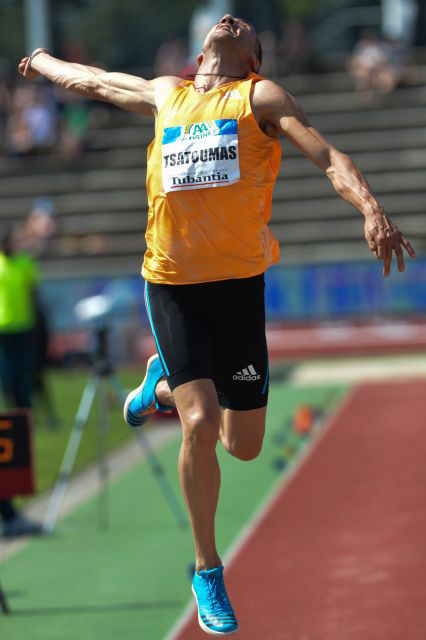
- Loúis Tsátoumas in action at the FBK Games in The Netherlands, 2014

Personal information
- Born: February 12, 1982 (age 44) Messene, Greece
- Height: 1.86 m (6 ft 1 in)
- Weight: 77 kg (170 lb)

Sport
- Country: Greece
- Sport: Athletics
- Event: Long jump
Medal record
European Championships
Silver medal – second place	2014 Zürich	Long jump
European Indoor Championships
Silver medal – second place	2007 Birmingham	Long jump
Mediterranean Games
Gold medal – first place	2013 Mersin	Long jump
Bronze medal – third place	2009 Pescara	Long jump

Louis Tsatoumas (Greek: Λούης Τσάτουμας, born 12 February 1982) is a Greek long jumper.

== Biography ==
He won his first major senior medal in 2007 at the European Indoor Athletics Championships, where he claimed the silver medal ending in second place after the Italian record-breaking Andrew Howe. On 2 June 2007 in Kalamata Tsatoumas jumped 8.66metres, achieving a personal best and a Greek record for the event. The performance was the best in the world since Iván Pedroso leaped 8.70m to win the gold medal at the 1995 World Championships. Tsatoumas ranks as the eighth best long jumper in history and holds the European record in the event at low altitude.

At the 2008 Olympics he had the longest qualifying jump with 8.27m, but after three consecutive fouls in the final he finished in last place. He was the bronze medallist at both the 2009 Mediterranean Games and 2009 European Team Championships. He represented Greece at the 2009 World Championships in Athletics, reaching the final round, but finished only eleventh overall. At the 2010 European Athletics Championships he was sixth.

In 2014 Tsatoumas set a Greek indoor record of 8.23m to win the national indoor title.

== Personal bests ==
Event	Performance	Date	Venue
Long jump	8.66 m (28 ft 4 3/4 in) (NR)	2 June 2007	Kalamata, Greece
Long jump (indoor)	8.23 m (27 ft 0 in)	February 2014	Pireas, Greece

== International competitions ==
Year	Competition	Venue	Position	Notes
Representing Greece
1999	World Youth Championships	Bydgoszcz, Poland	4th	7.54 m
2000	World Junior Championships	Santiago, Chile	21st (q)	7.15 m (wind: +0.3 m/s)
2001	European Junior Championships	Grosseto, Italy	1st	7.98 m (w)
2003	European U23 Championships	Bydgoszcz, Poland	1st	8.24 m (wind: -0.5 m/s)
2003	World Championships	Paris, France	12th	7.72 m
2003	World Athletics Final	Monte Carlo, Monaco	8th	7.22 m
2004	World Indoor Championships	Budapest, Hungary	25th (q)	7.34 m
2004	Olympic Games	Athens, Greece	22nd (q)	7.81 m
2005	European Indoor Championships	Madrid, Spain	final	NM
2006	World Indoor Championships	Moscow, Russia	4th	8.10 m
2006	European Championships	Gothenburg, Sweden	8th	7.84 m
2006	World Athletics Final	Stuttgart, Germany	3rd	8.29 m
2007	European Indoor Championships	Birmingham, United Kingdom	2nd	8.02 m
2008	World Indoor Championships	Valencia, Spain	10th (q)	7.77 m
2008	Olympic Games	Beijing, China	final	NM
2009	European Indoor Championships	Turin, Italy	12th (q)	7.79 m
2009	Mediterranean Games	Pescara, Italy	3rd	8.20 m
2009	World Championships	Berlin, Germany	11th	7.59 m
2010	European Championships	Barcelona, Spain	6th	8.09 m
2011	European Indoor Championships	Paris, France	13th (q)	7.81 m
2011	World Championships	Daegu, South Korea	14th (q)	8.01 m
2012	World Indoor Championships	Istanbul, Turkey	6th	7.88 m
2012	Olympic Games	London, United Kingdom	29th (q)	7.53 m
2013	European Indoor Championships	Gothenburg, Sweden	5th	8.00 m
2013	Mediterranean Games	Mersin, Turkey	1st	8.14 m
2013	World Championships	Moscow, Russia	10th	7.98 m
2014	World Indoor Championships	Sopot, Poland	4th	8.13 m
2014	European Championships	Zurich, Switzerland	2nd	8.15 m
2015	European Indoor Championships	Prague, Czech Republic	4th	7.98 m

Sporting positions
Preceded by Irving Saladino	Men's Long Jump Best Year Performance; 2007	Succeeded by Irving Saladino
