= Hayfa Sdiri =

Tunisian activist

- Born: 1997 (age 28–29)
- Citizenship: Tunisian
- Occupations: Entrepreneur, activist and ablogger
- Known for: Founder of Entr@crush
- Awards: BBC's 100 Women (2019)

Hayfa Sdiri (Arabic: هيفاء سديري Hayfā’ Sdīrī, born 1997) is a Tunisian entrepreneur, activist and blogger.

In 2016, she founded Entr@crush, an online platform for future entrepreneurs.

In 2019, she was listed among the BBC's 100 Women, a list of 100 inspiring and influential women.
