= Stefano Tremigliozzi =

Italian long jumper

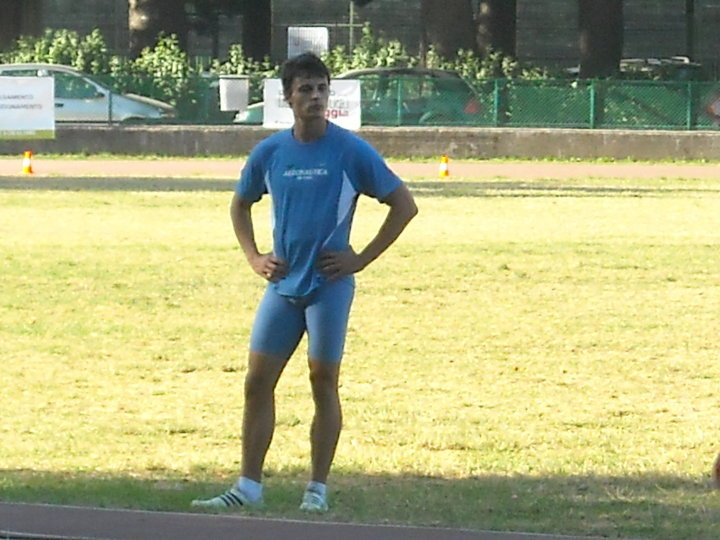

Personal information
- Nationality: Italian
- Born: May 7, 1985 (age 41) Benevento, Italy
- Height: 1.78 m (5 ft 10 in)
- Weight: 78 kg (172 lb)

Sport
- Country: Italy
- Sport: Athletics
- Event: Long jump
- Club: C.S. Aeronautica Militare

Achievements and titles
- Personal bests: Long jump: 8.01 m (2010); Long jump indoor: 8.06 m (2014)

Stefano Tremigliozzi (born 7 May 1985 in Benevento) is an Italian long jumper.

== Biography ==
He was the Italian champion in the long jump in 2008, with a jump of 7.85 metres. He was also the Italian indoor champion in 2009 (Ancona) and 2010 (Turin). His brother, Marco Tremigliozzi, was the Italian indoor champion in 2000.

In 2010 he established his personal best jump with 8.01 metres, which met the entry standard for the 2010 European Athletics Championships and was the 13th best European jump in 2010.

== Achievements ==
Year	Competition	Venue	Position	Event	Measure	Notes
2007	European U23 Championships	(Hungary) Debrecen	19th (q)	Long jump	6.71 m (wind: -0.6 m/s)	
2009	European Indoor Championships	(Italy) Turin	Qual.	Long jump	7.43 m	
2009	Mediterranean Games	(Italy) Pescara	8th	Long jump	7.62 m	
2009	Summer Universiade	(Serbia) Belgrade	9th	Long jump	7.48 m	
2010	European Championships	(Spain) Barcelona	Qual.	Long jump	7.80 m	

== National titles ==
He has won the individual national championship 6 times.

- 1 win in the long jump (2008)
- 5 wins in the long jump indoor (2009, 2010, 2013, 2014, 2016)

== See also ==
- Long jump winners of Italian Athletics Championships
