= Boleslav Skhirtladze =

Georgian long jumper (born 1987)

Boleslav Skhirtladze (Georgian: ბოლესლავ სხირტლაძე; born 14 June 1987 in Tbilisi) is a Georgian long jumper. He competed in the long jump event at the 2012 Summer Olympics.
