= Brian Johnson (long jumper) =

American long jumper (born 1980)

Personal information
- Nationality: United States
- Born: March 5, 1980 (age 46) Iowa, Louisiana, U.S.
- Home town: Baton Rouge, Louisiana, U.S.
- Height: 6 ft 5 in (1.96 m)
- Weight: 201 lb (91 kg)

Sport
- Sport: Athletics
- Event: Long jump
- Club: Holifield International
- Coached by: Johnny Thomas

Achievements and titles
- Personal bests: Outdoor: 8.52 m (2006); Indoor: 8.28 m (2003)

Brian Johnson (born March 5, 1980, in Iowa, Louisiana) is an American long jumper.

Johnson is a 2003 NCAA indoor champion, a 2006 U.S. outdoor long jump champion, and a two-time U.S. indoor champion (2005 and 2006). He posted a personal best of 8.33 metres by placing second in the men's long jump at an international meet in Fort-de-France, Martinique. Johnson also won a silver medal for his category at the 2007 IAAF World Athletics Final in Stuttgart, Germany, with a best jump of 8.16 metres.

Johnson earned a spot on the U.S. team for the 2008 Summer Olympics in Beijing, by placing second at the U.S. Olympic Trials in Eugene, Oregon, with a best jump of 8.30 metres (27–2.75 ft). He competed as a member of U.S. track and field team in the men's long jump, along with his teammates Miguel Pate and Trevell Quinley. Johnson performed the best jump at 7.79 metres from his second attempt, but fell short in his bid for the final, as he placed twenty-second overall in the qualifying rounds.

Johnson currently resides in Baton Rouge, Louisiana, where he works as an assistant track and field coach at Southern University. Johnson was also an athlete for the Southern Jaguars track and field team, where he won the 2003 long jump at the NCAA Division I Indoor Track and Field Championships with a jump of 8.28 meters.

Johnson was also an All-American sprinter in college, finishing 5th in the 100 meters at the 2002 NCAA Division I Outdoor Track and Field Championships.
