= Petteri Lax =

Finnish long jumper (born 1985)

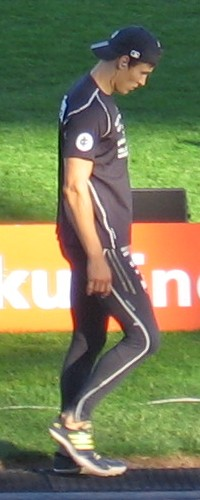
Petteri Lax at the Paavo Nurmi Games, Paavo Nurmi Stadium, Turku, June 24, 2009

Petteri Lax (born 12 October 1985 in Huittinen) is a Finnish long jumper.

== Achievements ==
Year	Competition	Venue	Position	Event	Notes
Representing Finland
2007	European U23 Championships	Debrecen, Hungary	2nd	Long jump	7.89 m (wind: 0.2 m/s)
2010	European Championships	Barcelona, Spain	7th	Long jump	7.96
