= Christian Reif =

German long jumper (born 1984)

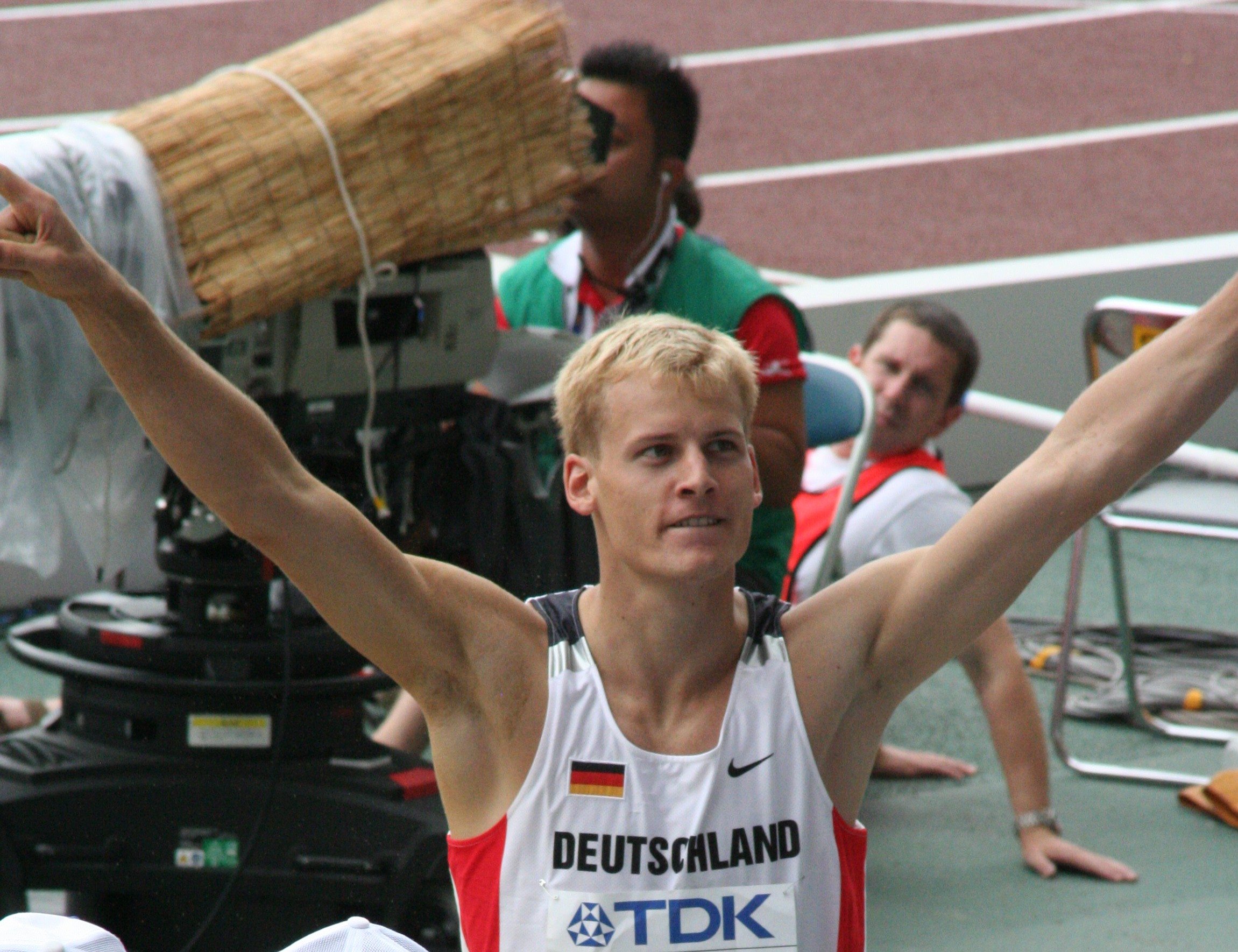

Personal information
- Born: October 24, 1984 (age 41) Speyer, West Germany
- Height: 1.96 m (6 ft 5 in)
- Weight: 85 kg (187 lb)

Sport
- Country: Germany
- Sport: Athletics
- Event: Long jump
Medal record
European Championships
Gold medal – first place	2010 Barcelona	Long jump
European Indoor Championships
Bronze medal – third place	2013 Gothenburg	Long jump
Continental Cup
Bronze medal – third place	2010 Split	Long jump
- Updated on 15 August 2012

Christian Reif (born 24 October 1984 in Speyer) is a retired German long jumper.

He finished ninth at the 2007 World Championships. He had previously competed at the 2007 European Indoor Championships without reaching the final.

His then personal best jump is 8.47 metres, achieved during the 2010 European Championships, in which he won the gold medal. In 2014 he extended his personal best to 8.49 metres.

== Competition record ==
Year	Competition	Venue	Position	Notes
Representing Germany
2007	European Indoor Championships	Birmingham, United Kingdom	14th (q)	7.58 m
2007	World Championships	Osaka, Japan	9th	7.95 m
2009	DécaNation	Paris, France	1st	8.18 m
2010	World Indoor Championships	Doha, Qatar	5th	7.86 m
2010	European Championships	Barcelona, Spain	1st	8.47 m
2011	World Championships	Daegu, South Korea	7th	8.19 m
2012	Olympic Games	London, United Kingdom	13th (q)	7.92 m
2013	European Indoor Championships	Gothenburg, Sweden	3rd	8.07 m
2013	World Championships	Moscow, Russia	6th	8.22 m
2014	World Indoor Championships	Sopot, Poland	8th	7.75 m
2014	European Championships	Zürich, Switzerland	8th	7.95 m
