= Salim Sdiri =

French long jumper

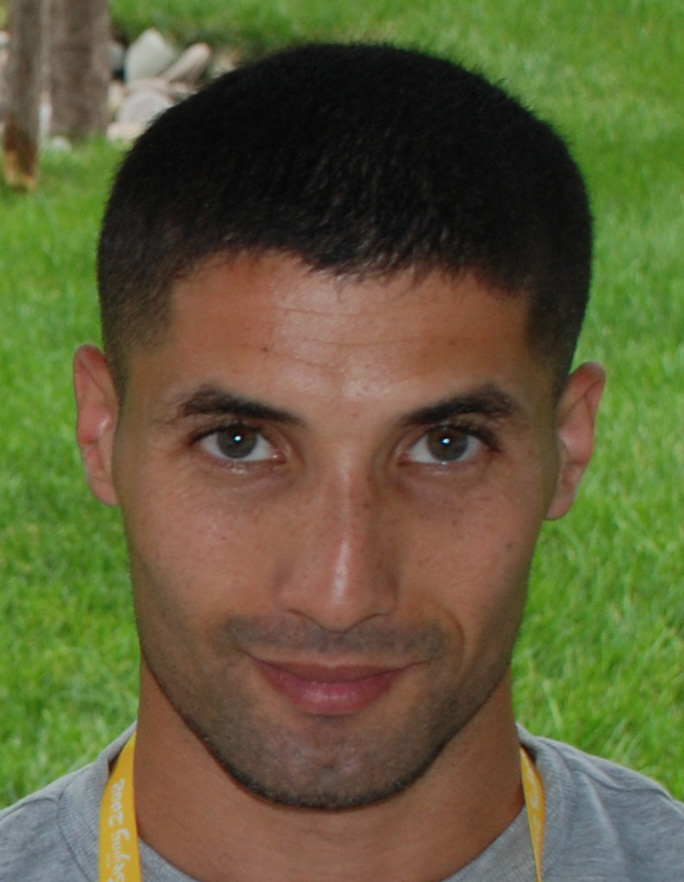
- Salim Sdiri in 2008.

Personal information
- Born: 26 October 1978 (age 47) Ajaccio, France
- Height: 1.85 m (6 ft 1 in)
- Weight: 78 kg (172 lb)

Sport
- Country: France
- Sport: Athletics
- Event: Long jump
- Club: USM Montargis
- Coached by: Danielle Desmier
Medal record
Mediterranean Games
Gold medal – first place	2005 Almería	Long jump
Gold medal – first place	2009 Pescara	Long jump
European Indoor Championships
Bronze medal – third place	2007 Birmingham	Long jump
- Updated on 15 August 2012

Salim Sdiri (born 26 October 1978) is a French long jumper of Tunisian descent. His personal best is 8.42 metres, achieved in June 2009 at Pierre-Bénite, which is the current French national record. He is also the French national record holder for indoor long jump with an 8.27 m jump in 2006. He has jumped eight meters or more every season since 2002 and has a bronze medallion from the 2007 European Indoor Athletics Championships.

== Career ==
=== Rome javelin accident ===
On Friday 13 July 2007, during the IAAF Golden League at Rome's Olimpico Stadium, Sdiri was hit in the scapula by a stray javelin thrown by the Finnish athlete Tero Pitkämäki. The javelin thrower slipped and threw the javelin towards the area where the jumpers were warming up.

Sdiri was rushed to a local hospital in Rome with non life-threatening injuries. The doctors believed, at the time, that the javelin had missed any vital organs by 4 centimetres. However, two days later, Sdiri was rushed back to the ER as the prognosis was incorrect. The javelin had actually torn a hole in his liver and torn and punctured the right kidney slightly. Sdiri responded to the many interviewers by saying:

The javelin touched the right kidney and there is a slight tear at the top of the kidney....the liver was also touched leaving a hole in it. The javelin penetrated over ten centimetres and not four as we initially thought.

=== Return to competition ===
After months of rehabilitation and questioning, he decided to prepare himself to return to competition for the Beijing Olympics in early 2008. However, he did not make the final round.

On 12 June 2009, Sdiri beat the former French record holder for long jump, Kader Klouchi (8.30 m in 1998) with an 8.43 m jump. Sdiri was selected to compete in the World Championships in Berlin in August 2009. He finished 6th, with an 8.07 m jump.

On 27 February 2012, in Paris-Bercy, Sdiri became the French champion in the indoor long jump by setting the best performance of the year worldwide with a jump of 8.24 m, just missing his French record by 3 centimetres. On 12 March 2012, he qualified for the finals in the long jump at the World Indoor Championships with a 7.94 m jump. He came second with an 8.01 m jump versus the 8.17 m jump of Fabrice Lapierre.

== Achievements ==
Games	2002	2003	2004	2005	2006	2007	2008	2009	2010	2011	2012
Olympic Games			12th				21st				23rd
World Indoor Championships		7th		5th				6th		16th	
European Athletics Championships	7th				10th				4th		12th
French Athletics Championships Outdoor			1st	1st	1st		1st	1st	1st	2nd	3rd
World Indoor Championships		7th							4th		
European Indoor Athletics Championships						3rd					
French Athletics Championships Indoor											
IAAF World Cup				5th	5th						

- Mediterranean Games
  - (gold) Sdiri holds the record for the games with an 8.29 m jump in 2009.

He is also the recipient of the trophy awarded to athletes that are selected for competition over 20 times internationally by the International Sports Federation in 2010.
