= Latvia at the 2018 European Athletics Championships =

- WA code: LAT
- National federation: LVS

in Berlin
- Competitors: 18

European Athletics Championships appearances
- 1934; 1938; 1946–1990; 1994; 1998; 2002; 2006; 2010; 2012; 2014; 2016; 2018; 2022; 2024

Other related appearances
- Soviet Union (1946–1990)

Latvia competed at the 2018 European Athletics Championships in Berlin, Germany, from 6–12 August 2018. A delegation of 18 athletes were sent to represent the country.

The following athletes were selected to compete by the Latvian Athletics Association.

Men
Track and road

| Athletes | Event | Heats | | Semifinal | | Final | |
| Athletes | Event | Result | Rank | Result | Rank | Result | Rank |
|---|---|---|---|---|---|---|---|
| Jānis Leitis | 400 metres | 45.56 (NR) | 5 (Q) | 45.53 (NR) | 15 | did not advance | |
| Jānis Višķers | Marathon | — | | | | 2:25:28 | 49 |
| Maksims Sinčukovs | 400 metres hurdles | 50.39 (SB) | 5 (Q) | 50.33 (NU23R) | 20 | did not advance | |
| Arnis Rumbenieks | 50 km walk | — | | | | DNF | DNF |

Field events

| Athletes | Event | Qualification | | Final | |
| Athletes | Event | Distance | Position | Distance | Position |
|---|---|---|---|---|---|
| Mareks Ārents | Pole vault | 5.36 | 22 | did not advance | |
| Elvijs Misāns | Triple jump | 16.26 | 17 | did not advance | |
| Gatis Čakšs | Javelin throw | 78.13 | 13 | did not advance | |
| Patriks Gailums | Javelin throw | 78.10 (SB) | 14 | did not advance | |
| Zigismunds Sirmais | Javelin throw | DNS | DNS | did not advance | |
| Rolands Štrobinders | Javelin throw | 81.93 | 7 (Q) | 76.59 | 11 |

Women
Track and road

| Athletes | Event | Heats | | Semifinal | | Final | |
| Athletes | Event | Result | Rank | Result | Rank | Result | Rank |
|---|---|---|---|---|---|---|---|
| Sindija Bukša | 100 metres | DNS | DNS | did not advance | | | |
| Sindija Bukša | 200 metres | 23.36 | 6 (Q) | DNS | DNS | did not advance | |
| Gunta Latiševa-Čudare | 400 metres | 51.98 | 6 (q) | 51.60 (SB) | 10 | did not advance | |
| Līga Velvere | 800 metres | 2:05.13 | 29 | did not advance | | | |
| Ilona Marhele | Marathon | — | | | | DNF | DNF |

Field events

| Athletes | Event | Qualification | | Final | |
| Athletes | Event | Distance | Position | Distance | Position |
|---|---|---|---|---|---|
| Lauma Grīva | Long jump | 6.47 | 18 | did not advance | |
| Anete Kociņa | Javelin throw | 57.48 | 17 | did not advance | |
| Līna Mūze | Javelin throw | 53.95 | 19 | did not advance | |
| Madara Palameika | Javelin throw | 60.21 | 6 (q) | 57.98 | 9 |
