= Latvia at the 2016 European Athletics Championships =

- WA code: LAT
- National federation: LVS
- Website: lat-athletics.lv/lv

in Amsterdam
- Competitors: 16 (8 men and 8 women) in 13 events
- Medals Ranked =17th: Gold 1 Silver 0 Bronze 0 Total 1

European Athletics Championships appearances
- 1934; 1938; 1946–1990; 1994; 1998; 2002; 2006; 2010; 2012; 2014; 2016; 2018; 2022; 2024

Other related appearances
- Soviet Union (1946–1990)

Latvia competed at the 2016 European Athletics Championships in Amsterdam, Netherlands, between 6 and 10 July 2016.

== Medals ==
Medal	Name	Event	Date
Gold	Zigismunds Sirmais	Men's javelin throw	7 July

== Results ==
Men

Track & road events

Athlete	Event	Heat		Semifinal		Final	
Athlete	Event	Result	Rank	Result	Rank	Result	Rank
Dmitrijs Jurkēvičs	1500 m	3:43.44	21	—		did not advance	
Jānis Baltušs	400 m hurdles	51.26	=14	did not advance			
Jānis Višķers	Half marathon	—				1:07:40	55

Field Events

Athlete	Event	Qualification		Final	
Athlete	Event	Distance	Rank	Distance	Rank
Mareks Ārents	Pole vault	5.50	=2 Q	5.50	6
Elvijs Misāns	Long jump	7.61w	20	did not advance	
Elvijs Misāns	Triple jump	16.50	11 q	16.32	9
Jānis Svens Grīva	Javelin throw	73.38	28	did not advance	
Zigismunds Sirmais	Javelin throw	82.96	5 Q	86.66 PB	1st place, gold medalist(s)
Rolands Štrobinders	Javelin throw	NM		did not advance	

Women

Track & road events

Athlete	Event	Heat		Semifinal		Final	
Athlete	Event	Result	Rank	Result	Rank	Result	Rank
Gunta Latiševa-Čudare	400 m	53.36 SB	7 Q	53.11 SB	20	did not advance	
Laura Ikauniece-Admidiņa	100 m hurdles	13.51	=23	did not advance			
Līga Velvere	400 m hurdles	57.38	8 Q	57.11	17	did not advance	
Agata Strausa	Half marathon	—				1:21:42	80

Field Events

Athlete	Event	Qualification		Final	
Athlete	Event	Distance	Rank	Distance	Rank
Aiga Grabuste	Long jump	NM		did not advance	
Līna Mūze	Javelin throw	NM		did not advance	
Sinta Ozoliņa	Javelin throw	57.58	14	did not advance	
Madara Palameika	Javelin throw	59.71	6 q	60.39	7
