= Latvia at the 2022 European Athletics Championships =

- Flag of Latvia
- WA code: LAT
- National federation: Latvian Athletics Association

in Munich, Germany 15 August 2022 – 21 August 2022
- Competitors: 8 (4 men and 4 women) in 5 events
- Medals: Gold 0 Silver 0 Bronze 0 Total 0

European Athletics Championships appearances
- 1934; 1938; 1946–1990; 1994; 1998; 2002; 2006; 2010; 2012; 2014; 2016; 2018; 2022; 2024

Other related appearances
- Soviet Union (1946–1990)

Latvia competed at the 2022 European Athletics Championships in Munich, Germany, between 15 and 21 August 2022

== Results ==
Latvia entered the following athletes.

Key

- Q = Qualified for the next round
- q = Qualified for the next round as a fastest loser or, in field events, by position without achieving the qualifying target
- NR = National record
- PB = Personal best
- SB = Season best
- N/A = Round not applicable for the event

=== Men ===
Track and road events

| Athlete | Event | Final | |
| Athlete | Event | Result | Rank |
|---|---|---|---|
| Raivo Saulgriezis | 20 km walk | 1:29:24 | 23 |

Field events

| Athlete | Event | Qualification | | Final | |
| Athlete | Event | Distance | Position | Distance | Position |
|---|---|---|---|---|---|
| Patriks Gailums | Javelin throw | 77.55 | 8 q | 78.82 | 6 |
| Rolands Štrobinders | Javelin throw | 77.33 | 10 q | 77.10 | 8 |
| Gatis Čakšs | Javelin throw | 74.63 | 17 | Did not advance | |

=== Women ===
Track and road events

| Athlete | Event | Heat | | Semifinal | | Final | |
| Athlete | Event | Result | Rank | Result | Rank | Result | Rank |
|---|---|---|---|---|---|---|---|
| Gunta Vaičule | 400 m | 52.26 | 9 Q | 51.25 PB | 10 | Did not advance | |

Field events

| Athlete | Event | Qualification | | Final | |
| Athlete | Event | Distance | Position | Distance | Position |
|---|---|---|---|---|---|
| Rūta Kate Lasmane | Triple jump | 13.49 | 17 | Did not advance | |
| Madara Palameika | Javelin throw | 60.56 SB | 4 q | 56.55 | 9 |
| Līna Mūze | Javelin throw | 57.69 | 10 q | 58.11 | 7 |
