= Latvia at the 2024 European Athletics Championships =

- Flag of Latvia
- WA code: LAT

in Rome, Italy 7 June 2024 – 12 June 2022
- Competitors: 12 (8 men and 4 women)

European Athletics Championships appearances
- 1934; 1938; 1946–1990; 1994; 1998; 2002; 2006; 2010; 2012; 2014; 2016; 2018; 2022; 2024

Other related appearances
- Soviet Union (1946–1990)

Latvia competed at the 2024 European Athletics Championships in Rome, Italy from 7–12 June 2024.

== Results ==
Latvia entered the following athletes.

Key

- Q = Qualified for the next round
- q = Qualified for the next round as a fastest loser or, in field events, by position without achieving the qualifying target
- NR = National record
- PB = Personal best
- SB = Season best
- N/A = Round not applicable for the event

=== Men ===
Track and road events

Athlete	Event	Heat		Semifinal		Final	
Athlete	Event	Result	Rank	Result	Rank	Result	Rank
Oskars Grava	200 metres	20.78 PB	7 q	20.79	13	Did not advance	
Artūrs Niklāvs Medveds	10,000 metres	—				29:09.03	34
Raivo Saulgriezis	20 kilometres walk	—				1:24:18	24

Field events

Athlete	Event	Qualification		Final	
Athlete	Event	Distance	Position	Distance	Position
Valters Kreišs	Pole vault	5.45	14	Did not advance	
Sandis Dzenītis	Triple jump	15.45 SB	26	Did not advance	
Gatis Čakšs	Javelin throw	79.22	14	Did not advance	
Patriks Gailums	Javelin throw	82.39 SB	6 Q	82.28	7
Rolands Štrobinders	Javelin throw	NM		Did not advance	

=== Women ===
Track and road events

Athlete	Event	Heat		Semifinal		Final	
Athlete	Event	Result	Rank	Result	Rank	Result	Rank
Gunta Vaičule	200 metres	23.23 SB	9 q	23.48	24	Did not advance	
Agata Caune	5000 metres	—				15:28.04	16

Field events

Athlete	Event	Qualification		Final	
Athlete	Event	Distance	Position	Distance	Position
Līna Mūze-Sirmā	Javelin throw	58.42	8 q	58.58	8
Anete Sietiņa	Javelin throw	57.71	12 q	59.34	7
