= List of Latvian records in athletics =

The following are the national records in athletics in Latvia maintained by its national athletics federation: Latvijas Vieglatlētikas Savienība (LVS).

== Outdoor ==
Key to tables: Awaiting ratification Record not kept by LVS Not ratified or later rescinded by LVS

# = not recognised by federation

=== Men ===
Event	Record	Athlete	Date	Meet	Place	Ref.
100 m	10.18 (+1.4 m/s)	Ronalds Arājs	3 July 2011	16th Meeting Via col... Vento	Donnas, Italy	
200 m	20.41 (+1.3 m/s)	Sergejs Inšakovs	31 July 1996	Olympic Games	Atlanta, United States	
400 m	45.53	Jānis Leitis	8 August 2018	European Championships	Berlin, Germany	
800 m	1:43.67	Dmitrijs Miļkevičs	3 July 2006		Athens, Greece	
1000 m	2:18.03	Einārs Tupurītis	16 July 1997		Nice, France	
1500 m	3:37.35	Dmitrijs Jurkevičs	28 June 2011	Folksam Grand Prix	Sollentuna, Sweden	
Mile	4:01.05	Dmitrijs Jurkevičs	28 May 2013	Gustav Sule Memorial	Tartu, Estonia	
Mile (road)	3:59.00	Artūrs Niklāvs Medveds	6 September 2026	New Balance Kö Meile	Düsseldorf, Germany	
2000 m	5:05.45	Dmitrijs Jurkevičs	1 July 2014		Viljandi, Estonia	
3000 m	7:49.51	Dmitrijs Jurkēvičs	8 June 2014	Fanny Blankers-Koen Games	Hengelo, Netherlands	
5000 m	13:34.2	Juris Grustiņš	18 July 1971		Moscow, Soviet Union	
5 km (road)	13:30	Artūrs Niklāvs Medveds	19 September 2026	World Road Running Championships	Copenhagen, Denmark	
10,000 m	28:25.8	Genādijs Hlistovs	3 June 1973		Moscow, Soviet Union	
10 km (road)	28:27	Artūrs Niklāvs Medveds	11 November 2025	Bieg Niepodległości	Warsaw, Poland	
20,000 m	1:00:00	Pēteris Krūmiņš	30 April 1978		Vilnius, Soviet Union	
20 km (road)	58:53	Pēteris Krūmiņš	30 April 1976		Vilnius, Soviet Union	
One hour	20000 m	Pēteris Krūmiņš	30 April 1978		Vilnius, Soviet Union	
Half marathon	1:04:23	Dmitrijs Serjogins	5 February 2023	Almería Half Marathon	Almería, Spain	
25 km (road)	1:19:36+	Valērijs Žolnerovičs	27 October 2013	Frankfurt Marathon	Frankfurt, Germany	
30 km (road)	1:35:44+	Valērijs Žolnerovičs	27 October 2013	Frankfurt Marathon	Frankfurt, Germany	
Marathon	2:14:24	Valērijs Žolnerovičs	14 May 2017	Riga Marathon	Riga, Latvia	
3000 m steeplechase	8:31.35	Gatis Deksnis	4 September 1988		Moscow, Soviet Union	
110 m hurdles	13.08 (±0.0 m/s)	Staņislavs Olijars	1 July 2003	Athletissima	Lausanne, Switzerland	
400 m hurdles	49.60	Viktors Lācis	1 June 2001	Prefontaine Classic	Eugene, United States	
High jump	2.30 m	Normunds Sietiņš	20 July 1992		Nurmijärvi, Finland	
Pole vault	5.80 m	Aleksandrs Obižajevs	17 July 1987		Brjansk, Soviet Union	
Long jump	8.08 m (+1.0 m/s)	Elvijs Misāns	12 July 2016		Saldus, Latvia	
Triple jump	17.56 m (+1.9 m/s)	Māris Bružiks	3 September 1988		Riga, Soviet Union	
Shot put	21.74 m	Jānis Bojārs	14 July 1984		Riga, Soviet Union	
Discus throw	62.00 m	Staņislavs Skruļs	6 August 1975		Gomel, Soviet Union	
Hammer throw	80.14 m	Igors Sokolovs	30 May 2009		Riga, Latvia	
Javelin throw	90.73 m	Vadims Vasiļevskis	22 July 2007		Tallinn, Estonia	
Decathlon	8312 pts	Edgars Eriņš	4–5 June 2011	Latvian Championships	Valmiera, Latvia	
Decathlon	100m (wind) / Long jump (wind) / Shot put / High jump / 400m / 110m H (wind) / Discus / Pole vault / Javelin / 1500m; 10.79 (+2.1 m/s) / 7.67 m (+0.2 m/s) / 14.19 m / 1.90 m / 48.65 / 14.56 (+1.2 m/s) / 49.94 m / 4.50 m / 58.30 m / 4:14.25					
5000 m walk (track)	18:48.3	Aigars Fadejevs	21 June 1998		Lapinlahti, Finland	
10,000 m walk (track)	38:56.3	Ingus Janevics	26 April 2008		Valga, Estonia	
10 km walk (road)	38:46	Aigars Fadejevs	10 September 1995		Druskininkai, Lithuania	
15,000 m walk (track)	1:03:55.0	Aivars Rumbenieks	30 September 1979		Poltava, Ukraine	
15 km walk (road)	58:23	Aigars Fadejevs	7 September 1997		Druskininkai, Lithuania	
Hour walk (track)	13883 m	Aivars Rumbenieks	29 September 1976		Ogre, Soviet Union	
20,000 m walk (track)	1:20:56.5	Aigars Fadejevs	25 May 1996		Södertälje, Sweden	
20 km walk (road)	1:19:25	Aigars Fadejevs	25 August 2002		Hildesheim, Germany	
Two hours walk (track)	26374 m	Modris Liepiņš	5 November 1994		Valmiera, Latvia	
30 km walk (road)	2:06:13	Aigars Fadejevs	1 May 2002		Sesto San Giovanni, Italy	
50,000 m walk (track)	3:59:48.4	Modris Liepiņš	7 May 1994		Fana, Norway	
50 km walk (road)	3:43:18	Aigars Fadejevs	6 June 1998		Ogre, Latvia	
4 × 100 m relay	39.32	Latvian SSR; Genādijs Murašovs; Ronalds Razmuss; Juris Tone; Āris Āboliņš	18 June 1983		Moscow, Soviet Union	
4 × 200 m relay	1:25.4a	Latvian SSR; Valerijs Radēvičs; Jānis Balodis; Juris Silovs; Anatolijs Mackevičs	29 July 1979		Moscow, Soviet Union	
4 × 400 m relay	3:04.30	Latvia; Sergejs Inšakovs; Egīls Tēbelis; Einārs Tupurītis; Inguns Svikliņš	9 August 1997	World Championships	Athens, Greece	
4 × 800 m relay	7:23.3 h	Latvian SSR; Sergejs Varša; Viktors Fedotovs; Olegs Stepanovs; Ēriks Barkovskis	30 May 1981		Riga, Soviet Union	
4 × 1500 m relay	15:14.0	Latvian SSR; Mārtiņš Paukšens; Valdis Šangelis; Vladimis Pehotko; Uldis Rubezis	16 October 1969		Uzhhorod, Soviet Union	

=== Women ===
Event	Record	Athlete	Date	Meet	Place	Ref.
100 m	11.29 (+1.1 m/s)	Sindija Bukša	29 May 2018	Rīgas kausi	Riga, Latvia	
200 m	22.49	Vineta Ikauniece	23 May 1987		Tsaghkadzor, Soviet Union	
300 m	36.36	Gunta Vaičule	20 June 2019	Golden Spike Ostrava	Ostrava, Czech Republic	
400 m	50.71	Vineta Ikauniece	4 September 1988		Moscow, Soviet Union	
500 m (road)	1:08.29	Līga Velvere	8 September 2018	GreatCity Games	Gateshead, United Kingdom	
800 m	1:58.64	Marita Ārente	19 July 1984		Moscow, Soviet Union	
1000 m	2:39.3 h	Marita Ārente	12 August 1984		Riga, Soviet Union	
1500 m	4:09.8 h	Rita Vilciņa	8 June 1979		Sochi, Soviet Union	
Mile (road)	4:52.00	Austra Ošiņa	14 May 2022		Riga, Latvia	
3000 m	8:39.78	Agate Caune	16 July 2023	Kamila Skolimowska Memorial	Chorzów, Poland	
5000 m	14:47.71	Jeļena Prokopčuka	11 August 2000	DN Galan	Stockholm, Sweden	
5 km (road)	15:23	Agate Caune	7 May 2023		Riga, Latvia	
10,000 m	30:38.78	Jeļena Prokopčuka	7 August 2006	European Championships	Gothenburg, Sweden	
10 km (road)	31:33	Jeļena Prokopčuka	21 May 2006	Great Manchester Run	Manchester, United Kingdom	
20 km (road)	1:06:44	Jeļena Prokopčuka	13 October 2002		Paris, France	
Half marathon	1:08:43	Jeļena Prokopčuka	7 October 2001		Bristol, United Kingdom	
Marathon	2:22:56	Jeļena Prokopčuka	30 January 2005	Osaka International Ladies Marathon	Osaka, Japan	
100 m hurdles	12.90	Ludmila Olijare	8 September 1989		Brjansk, Soviet Union	
100 m hurdles	12.6 h	Ludmila Olijare	5 August 1989		Vilnius, Soviet Union	
400 m hurdles	55.46	Lana Jēkabsone	9 June 1996		Tallinn, Estonia	
2000 m steeplechase	6:19.8 h	Inna Poluškina	10 August 2003		Kaunas, Lithuania	
3000 m steeplechase	9:27.21	Poļina Jeļizarova	4 August 2012	Olympic Games	London, United Kingdom	
High jump	1.97 m	Valentīna Gotovska	4 August 1990		Vilnius, Lithuania	
Pole vault	4.27 m	Alisona Neidere	1 July 2021 (Note: by World Athletics source; 30 June 2021 by federation source)	NSAF The Outdoor Nationals	Eugene, United States	
Long jump	6.92 m (+0.7 m/s)	Ineta Radēviča	28 July 2010	European Championships	Barcelona, Spain	
Triple jump	14.76 m (+1.1 m/s)	Gundega Sproģe	29 June 1997		Sheffield, United Kingdom	
Shot put	18.75 m	Skaidrīte Baikova	2 April 1984		Riga, Soviet Union	
Discus throw	65.06 m	Malda Lange	11 September 1988		Valmiera, Soviet Union	
Hammer throw	73.56 m	Laura Igaune	10 May 2019	Mount Olive First Chance and Multi	Mount Olive, United States	
Javelin throw	66.18 m	Madara Palameika	9 September 2016	Memorial Van Damme	Brussels, United States	
Heptathlon	6815 pts	Laura Ikauniece-Admidiņa	27–28 May 2017	Hypo Meeting	Götzis, Austria	
Heptathlon	100m H (wind) / High jump / Shot put / 200m (wind) / Long jump (wind) / Javelin / 800m; 13.10 (+1.0 m/s) / 1.77 m / 13.53 m / 23.49 (−2.9 m/s) / 6.64 m (+0.8 m/s) / 56.17 m / 2:11.76					
3000 m walk (track)	12:27.0	Anita Liepiņa	16 August 1997		Ventspils, Latvia	
5000 m walk (track)	21:07.7	Jolanta Dukure	28 April 2007		Murjāņi, Latvia	
5 km walk (road)	21:22	Jolanta Dukure	7 September 1999		Druskininkai, Lithuania	
10,000 m walk (track)	44:07.88	Anita Liepiņa	4 August 1997	World Championships	Athens, Greece	
10 km walk (road)	42:59	Jolanta Dukure	21 July 2000		Aizpute, Latvia	
20 km walk (road)	1:31:02	Jolanta Dukure	9 August 2006	European Championships	Gothenburg, Sweden	
Half marathon walk (road)	1:48:58	Modra Liepina	15 August 2026	European Championships	Birmingham, United Kingdom	
30 km walk (road)	2:39:45	Jolanta Dukure	30 September 2006		Ogre, Latvia	
50 km walk (road)	4:16:27	Jolanta Dukure	9 September 2006		Paralepa, Estonia	
4 × 100 m relay	44.41	Latvian SSR; Irina Grigorjeva; Vineta Ikauniece; Lilija Ždanovska; Ludmila Olijare	20 June 1983		Moscow, Soviet Union	
4 × 200 m relay	1:33.8 h	Latvian SSR; Alla Kozlovska; Inta Drēviņa; Irina Grigorjeva; Ingrida Barkāne	29 July 1979		Moscow, Soviet Union	
4 × 400 m relay	3:30.2 h	Latvian SSR; Anna Dundere; Sarmīte Štūla; Ingrīda Barkāne; Inta Kļimoviča-Drēviņa	30 July 1975		Moscow, Soviet Union	
4 × 800 m relay	8:33.6 h	Latvian SSR; Klavdija Mihailova; Zenta Ezerniece; Skaidrite Velberga; Rita Vilciņa	30 July 1975		Moscow, Soviet Union	

=== Mixed ===
Event	Record	Athlete	Date	Meet	Place	Ref.
4 × 400 m relay	3:22.71	Latvia; Iļja Petrušenko; Katrīna Kamarūte; Artūrs Pastors; Gunta Vaičule	22 June 2023	European Team Championships	Chorzów, Poland	

=== U23 Men ===
Event	Record	Athlete	Date	Meet	Place	Ref.
100 m	10.51	Genadijs Murasovs	17 September 1981		Moscow, Soviet Union	
200 m	20.75 A (+1.9 m/s)	Ronalds Arājs	3 May 2008		Albuquerque, United States	
400 m	46.44	Dmitrijs Miļkevičs	18 July 2003	European U23 Championships	Bydgoszcz, Poland	
800 m	1:46.07	Viktors Lacis	19 July 1997		Riga, Latvia	
1500 m	3:39.69	Dmitrijs Jurkevičs	25 August 2009		Tallinn, Estonia	
5000 m	13:47.4 h	Genadijs Hlistovs	2 July 1966		Odessa, Soviet Union	
10,000 m	28:49.4 h	Genadijs Hlistovs	17 June 1966		London, United Kingdom	
3000 m steeplechase	8:34.4 h	Arnolds Beinarovics	4 August 1973		Leningrad, Soviet Union	
110 m hurdles	13.25 (+0.2 m/s)	Staņislavs Olijars	18 August 2000	Herculis	Fontvieille, Monaco	
400 m hurdles	50.33	Maksims Sincukovs	7 August 2018	European Championships	Berlin, Germany	
High jump	2.28 m	Normunds Pūpols	8 July 2006		Riga, Latvia	
Pole vault	5.62 m	Aleksandrs Obižajevs	4 June 1981		Riga, Soviet Union	
Long jump	8.07 m	Juris Tone	21 June 1983		Moscow, Soviet Union	
Triple jump	17.15 m	Māris Bružiks	17 June 1984		Riga, Soviet Union	
Shot put	20.02 m	Aigars Dronka	2 May 1983		Riga, Soviet Union	
Discus throw	58.50 m	Uldis Meijers	22 August 1984		Riga, Soviet Union	
Hammer throw	69.56 m	Vilnis Sudars	3 September 1985		Riga, Soviet Union	
Javelin throw	84.95 m	Vadims Vasiļevskis	28 August 2004	Olympic Games	Athens, Greece	
Decathlon	7961 pts	Edgars Eriņš	15–16 June 2007		Valmiera, Latvia	
Decathlon	100m (wind) / Long jump (wind) / Shot put / High jump / 400m / 110m H (wind) / Discus / Pole vault / Javelin / 1500m; 10.81 / 7.04 m / 13.95 m / 1.91 m / 48.08 / 14.80 / 48.17 m / 4.30 m / 52.97 m / 4:15.74					
20 km walk (road)	1.19:36	Aigars Fadejevs	25 May 1997		Naumburg, Germany	
4 × 100 m relay	41.49	Latvia; Konstantins Germanovics; Sandis Sabajevs; Henrijs Arajs; Janis Mezitis	18 August 2006		Valmiera, Latvia	

=== Junior Men ===
Event	Record	Athlete	Date	Meet	Place	Ref.
100 m	10.40	Ronalds Arājs	1 April 2006		El Paso, United States	
200 m	21.07	Staņislavs Olijars	30 January 1998		Bloemfontein, South Africa	
400 m	46.83	Jānis Leitis	15 June 2008		Ventspils, Latvia	
800 m	1:47.61	Dmitrijs Jurkevičs	8 July 2006		Mannheim, Germany	
1500 m	3:46.1 h	Aldis Purvins	7 August 1983		Krasnodar, Soviet Union	
5000 m	14:14.8 h	Juris Grauds	3 June 1971		Riga, Soviet Union	
10,000 m	30:35.11	Martins Alksnis	11 June 1994		Ljubljana, Slovenia	
Half marathon	1:06:26	Viktors Slesarenoks	21 September 2003		Tallinn, Estonia	
Marathon	2:22:08	Viktors Slesarenoks	18 September 2004	Warsaw Marathon	Warsaw, Poland	
3000 m steeplechase	8:51.4 h	Janis Iesalnieks	27 August 1974		Moscow, Soviet Union	
110 m hurdles	13.49 (+0.6 m/s)	Staņislavs Olijars	11 July 1998		Valmiera, Latvia	
400 m hurdles	51.66	Marians Zigmunds	5 July 1996		Valmiera, Latvia	
High jump	2.26 m	Normunds Sietiņš	19 June 1986		Murjani, Soviet Union	
Pole vault	5.30 m	Aleksandrs Matusevics	19 June 1992		Keuru, Finland	
Long jump	7.83 m (+1.6 m/s)	Andrejs Maškancevs	21 July 2005		Kaunas, Lithuania	
Triple jump	16.16 m (+0.1 m/s)	Elvijs Misans	18 July 2008		Valmiera, Latvia	
Shot put	19.06 m	Aleksejs Lukasenko	9 August 1986		Karl-Marx-Stadt, East Germany	
Discus throw	56.84 m	Andris Smocs	2 May 1987		Riga, Soviet Union	
Hammer throw	66.94 m	Jānis Radziņš	12 May 1975		Riga, Soviet Union	
Javelin throw	84.69 m	Zigismunds Sirmais	22 June 2011		Bauska, Latvia	
Decathlon	7665 pts	Jānis Karlivāns	30 June – 1 July 2001		Ried, Austria	
Decathlon	100m (wind) / Long jump (wind) / Shot put / High jump / 400m / 110m H (wind) / Discus / Pole vault / Javelin / 1500m; 11.31 / 7.01 m / 12.93 m / 2.10 m / 49.70 / 14.96 / 44.86 m / 4.30 m / 57.04 m / 4:46.25					

== Indoor ==
=== Men ===
Event	Record	Athlete	Date	Meet	Place	Ref.
50 m	5.82	Ronalds Arājs	11 February 2011		Saskatoon, Canada	
60 m	6.65	Juris Silovs	9 March 1974	European Championships	Gothenburg, Sweden	
60 m	6.4 h	Juris Silovs	4 February 1971		Moscow, Soviet Union	
60 m	6.4 h	Genadijs Murasovs	30 January 1981		Riga, Soviet Union	
100 m	10.66	Juris Silovs	1 March 1978		Moscow, Soviet Union	
100 m	10.66	Genadijs Murasovs	3 February 1979		Leningrad, Soviet Union	
100 m	10.3 h	Āris Āboliņš	24 February 1980		Moscow, Soviet Union	
200 m	21.19	Oskars Grava	18 February 2024	Latvian Championships	Valmiera, Latvia	
300 m	33.64	Iļja Petrušenko	19 January 2023	Estonian Indoor Cup	Tallinn, Estonia	
400 m	46.71	Jānis Leitis	26 January 2013	Razorback Invitational	Fayetteville, United States	
500 m	1:05.0 h	Aivars Krisans	18 January 1987		Klaipėda, Soviet Union	
600 m	1:15.60	Dmitrijs Miļkevičs	5 February 2005		Lincoln, United States	
800 m	1:45.72	Dmitrijs Miļkevičs	9 March 2008	World Championships	Valencia, Spain	
1000 m	2:22.82	Dmitrijs Miļkevičs	22 January 2005		Lincoln, United States	
1500 m	3:42.84	Dmitrijs Jurkevičs	7 March 2015	European Championships	Prague, Czech Republic	
Mile	4:03.51	Uģis Jocis	26 January 2019	Indiana University Relays	Bloomington, United States	
2000 m	5:17.23	Uģis Jocis	30 November 2019	Kuldīga Region Open Championships	Kuldīga, Latvia	
3000 m	7:57.78	Uģis Jocis	27 January 2018	BU John Thomas Terrier Classic	Boston, United States	
5000 m	13:54.8	Juris Grustins	2 March 1966		Leningrad, Soviet Union	
50 m hurdles	6.46	Staņislavs Olijars	23 February 2003		Liévin, France	
55 m hurdles	7.18	Stanislavs Olijars	30 January 1999		Gainesville, United States	
60 m hurdles	7.42	Igors Kazanovs	25 February 1989		Moscow, Soviet Union	
110 m hurdles	13.66	Igors Kazanovs	23 February 1992		Saint Petersburg, Russia	
High jump	2.28 m	Normunds Sietiņš	15 February 1992		Panevėžys, Lithuania	
Pole vault	5.82 m	Valters Kreiss	15 February 2025	Perche en Or pole vault meeting	Roubaix, France	
Long jump	8.11 m (Note: outdoor mark ratified as absolute record)	Artūrs Āboliņš	10 March 2006	NCAA Division I Championships	Fayetteville, United States	
Triple jump	17.54 m	Māris Bružiks	23 February 1986		Madrid, Spain	
Shot put	21.25 m	Jānis Bojārs	17 February 1984		Moscow, Soviet Union	
Shot put	21.25 m	Māris Petrasko	8 January 1989		Vilnius, Soviet Union	
Heptathlon	5787 pts	Edgars Eriņš	22–23 February 2008		Riga, Latvia	
Heptathlon	60m / Long jump / Shot put / High jump / 60m H / Pole vault / 1000m; 7.04 / 7.35 m / 15.18 m / 1.97 m / 8.16 / 4.00 m / 2:38.92					
5000 m walk	18:56.9	Aigars Fadejevs	19 February 1995		Riga, Latvia	
10,000 m walk	39:34.6	Aivars Rumbenieks	17 February 1980		Moscow, Soviet Union	
4 × 200 m relay	1:27.84	Latvia; Sandis Sabajevs; Dmitrijs Hadakovs; Māris Grēniņš; Dmitrijs Jurkevičs	20 February 2002		Tallinn, Estonia	
4 × 400 m relay						

=== Women ===
Event	Record	Athlete	Date	Meet	Place	Ref.
60 m	7.32	Vineta Ikauniece	20 February 1988		Moscow, Soviet Union	
60 m	7.0 h	Vineta Ikauniece	19 January 1986		Minsk, Soviet Union	
100 m	11.5 h	Vineta Ikauniece	26 January 1986		Riga, Soviet Union	
200 m	23.44	Vineta Ikauniece	21 February 1988		Moscow, Soviet Union	
200 m	23.15 #	Marina Krivosheina-Trandenkova	5 March 1988		Minsk, Soviet Union	
300 m	36.96	Gunta Latiševa-Čudare	13 February 2018	Meeting Pas de Calais	Liévin, France	
400 m	52.66	Gunta Vaičule	1 March 2019	European Championships	Glasgow, United Kingdom	
500 m	1:14.4 h	Anna Anfinogentova	14 February 2004		Riga, Latvia	
600 m	1:28.34	Līga Velvere	14 January 2017		Kuldīga, Latvia	
800 m	2:01.10	Līga Velvere	12 February 2019	Meeting Elite du Val d'Oise	Eaubonne, France	
1000 m	2:42.30	Līga Velvere	19 January 2019	Catherine's Cup	Kuldīga, Latvia	
1500 m	4:15.10	Poļina Jeļizarova	1 March 2013	European Championships	Gothenburg, Sweden	
3000 m	8:44.66	Jeļena Prokopčuka	27 February 2000	European Championships	Ghent, Belgium	
60 m hurdles	8.06	Ludmila Olijare	17 February 1985		Kishinev, Soviet Union	
100 m hurdles	13.1	Ludmila Olijara	19 February 1984		Moscow, Soviet Union	
2000 m steeplechase	7:16.26	Anna Marija Petrakova	27 February 2020		Kyiv, Ukraine	
High jump	1.92 m	Valentīna Gotovska	8 January 1989		Vilnius, Soviet Union	
Pole vault	4.19 m	Krista Obižajeva	5 February 2013		Tartu, Estonia	
Long jump	6.82 m	Aiga Grabuste	8 February 2015	Georgian Winter Championships	Tbilisi, Georgia	
Triple jump	14.15 m	Rūta Lasmane	13 March 2021	NCAA Division I Championships	Fayetteville, United States	
Shot put	18.29 m	Skaidrite Baikova	5 February 1985		Moscow, Soviet Union	
Weight throw	20.02 m	Laura Igaune	18 January 2014	Otterbein Invitational	Westerville, United States	
Pentathlon	4701 pts	Laura Ikauniece	1 March 2019	European Championships	Glasgow, United Kingdom	
Pentathlon	60m H / High jump / Shot put / Long jump / 800m; 8.29 / 1.84 m / 13.31 m / 6.33 m / 2:14.01					
3000 m walk	12:32.9	Jolanta Dukure	6 February 1999		Riga, Latvia	
5000 m walk	22:17.2	Jolanta Dukure	19 January 2008		Kuldīga, Latvia	
4 × 200 m relay	1:42.60	Latvia; Jelena Savilova; Inese Petruna; Jūlija Tolmačova; Irena Žauna	16 February 2000		Tallinn, Estonia	
4 × 400 m relay						

== See also ==
- List of Baltic records in athletics
