= Riga Marathon =

Annual race in Latvia held since 1991

Coordinates: 56.9478°N 24.1028°E

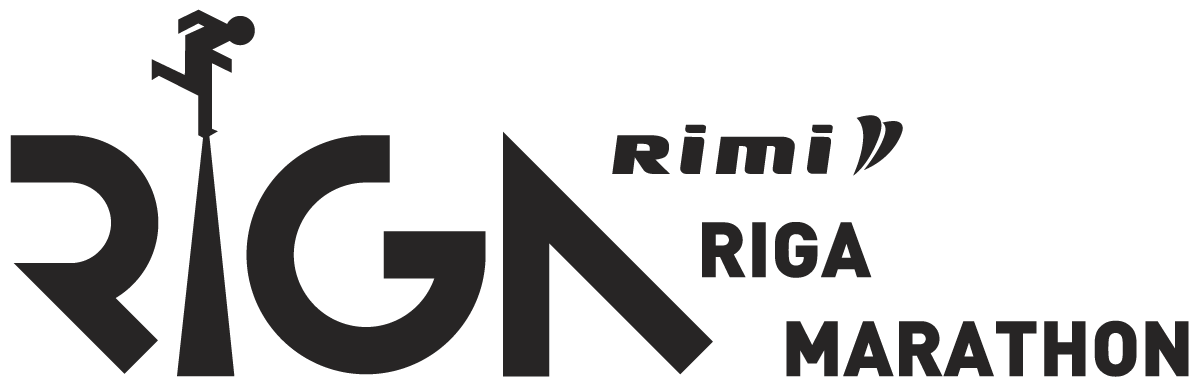
- Date: 18–19 May 2024
- Location: Riga, Latvia
- Event type: Road
- Distance: Marathon, Half marathon, 10k, 5k, Mile
- Primary sponsor: Rimi Baltic
- Established: 1991 (35 years ago)
- Course records: Marathon: Men's: 2:08:51 (2019) (Ethiopia) Andualem Shiferaw; Women's: 2:26:18 (2019) (Ethiopia) Birke Debele; Half Marathon: Men's: 1:00:21 (2024) (Kenya) Samwel Mailu; Women's: 1:07:13 (2024) (Kenya) Judy Kemboi
- Website: Riga Marathon
- Participants: 4,350 marathon runners (2025); 40,122 (all races, 2025)

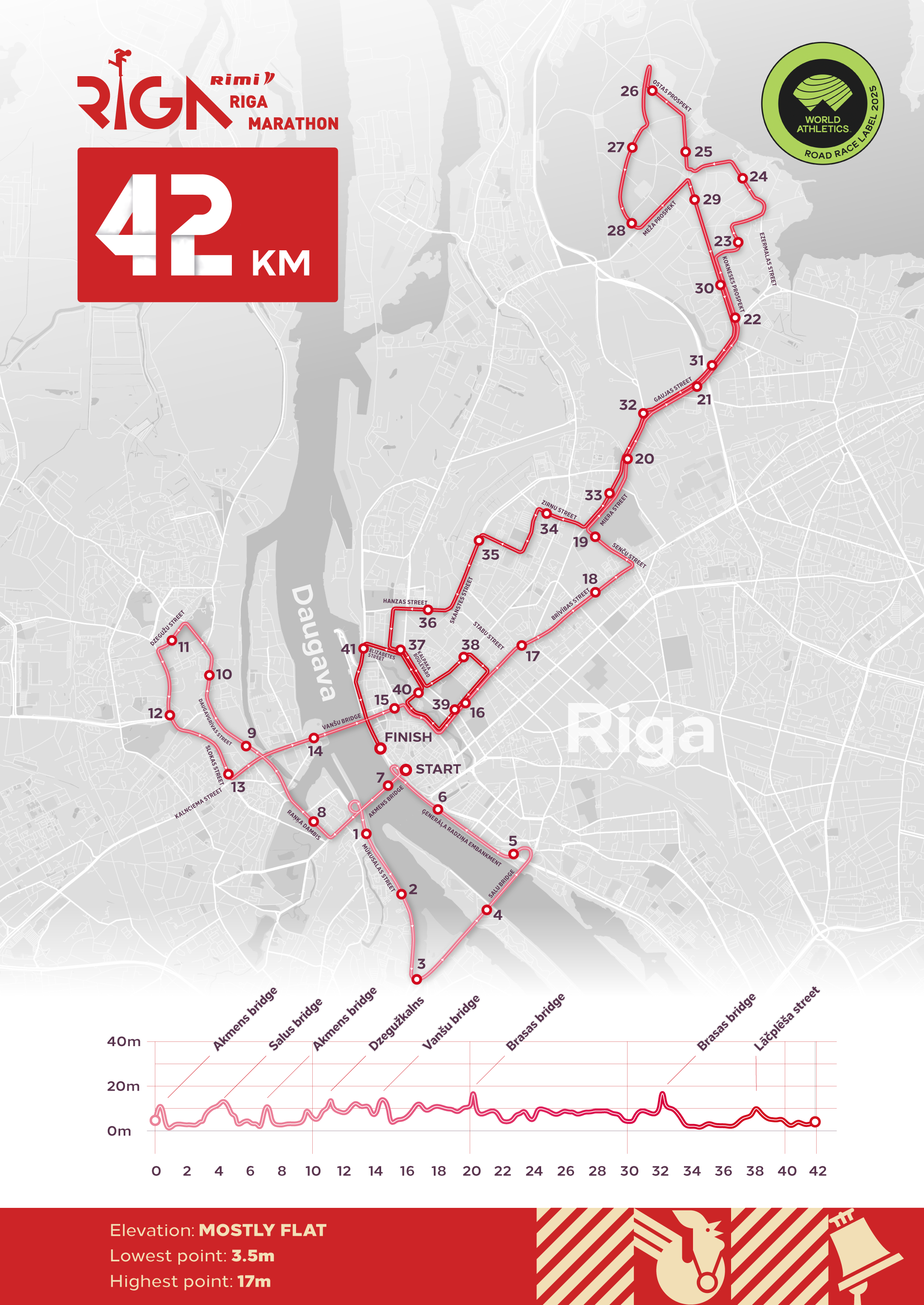
Map of Rimi Riga Marathon 2026 42,195km course with elevation changes.

The Riga Marathon (also known as the Rimi Riga Marathon) is an annual road marathon held in Riga, Latvia, since 1991. A flat, single-lap marathon course in the Baltics' largest city. The marathon course has been measured and certified by AIMS, the Association of International Marathons and Distance Races and is categorized as a Gold Label Road Race by World Athletics. All courses are traffic-free. Rimi Riga Marathon is one of the fastest-growing marathons in Northern Europe. In 2025, there were 40,122 participants across all distances from 109 countries.

The marathon starts and finishes near Riga Castle, and runs through Old Riga as well as across the Daugava River. In the marathon weekend it is possible to run a 42,195 kilometer marathon distance, 21,095 kilometer half marathon, 10 kilometer, 6 kilometer and mile course distances.

== History ==
For the first time, Latvian athletes competed in the marathon distance at the 1912 Olympic Games in Stockholm, but the first marathon competition in Latvia took place 15 years later in Liepāja. The popularity of marathon running continued to grow in the 1970s, reaching its heyday in the late 1980s. The Folk Song Marathon (1988–1990) gathered several thousand runners during the revival, of which 250–300 finished at a distance of 42 km.

=== The start of Riga Marathon history ===
The first start shot of the Riga Marathon was fired at the Freedom Monument on 27 July 1991, shortly after the time of the barricades, when the capital city was shaken by OMON shots. Then this marathon was called the Riga International Marathon. The participants of this marathon were provided with both grand cash prizes (1000 German Marks for the first-place winners), a pennant, and the then exotic fruit – banana – at the finish line.

The track was measured according to the international standards of the time, using a 50 m-long measuring tape and pegs. 735 participants took part in the first Riga Marathon, a third of which were local runners, around 30 representatives of Western countries, and the rest from the USSR.

However, in the next few years after the successful start, the number of participants in the Riga Marathon rapidly decreased. Runners from the Eastern Bloc were deterred from participating by the new visa regime, while Westerners might find the trip to Latvia too risky. Serious difficulties were caused by hyperinflation and repeated changes in the national currency. In 1993, it was possible to pay for participation in the marathon in three currencies – locals could pay both in Latvian rubles and newly issued lats, and foreigners – in Deutsche Marks.

The organizers lacked the sponsors and funds to be included in the AIMS international marathon calendar (at the time it would cost $1,000 per year) to attract western marathon tourists. During this time, local runners also became fewer and fewer, and the running culture and, consequently, the interest of sponsors gradually decreased, reaching the lowest point in 1999, when only 53 Latvian runners finished the 42 km distance.

=== Certified course and new organizers ===
In 2007, the track was officially certified and recognized for the first time according to the standards of the International Marathon Association (Association of International Marathons and Distance Races, AIMS).

To increase the number of participants, the Riga Marathon was moved to the spring, attracting school youth to the 5 km distance, however, there were still relatively few runners in the marathon distance and the results could not surpass the performance of the first year.

In 2007, the Riga Marathon got its second wind. After 16 years of work, the original organizer of the marathon, Jānis Karavačiks, entrusted the organization to Aigars Nords, who was full of ambition to turn Riga into a running megalopolis with an ambitious city marathon.

The Riga City Council has entrusted the organization of the marathon to NECom or Nords Event Communications, the new organizers already achieved ambitious growth of the event in the first year. With the help of the new title sponsor Nordea and the slogan "This time for real!" the track was officially certified for the first time following the standards of the International Marathon Association (AIMS). The marathon was included in the international calendar, the usual marathon and 5 km satellite distances were supplemented by a new half-marathon, and the Kenyan Johnston Changwoni broke the Riga Marathon record set in 1991.

Under the auspices of the new organizers, the marathon became one of the fastest-growing and most prestigious running festivals in Northern Europe – from 1300 participants in 2007 to Gold Label gold status and more than 38 thousand participants from 82 countries of the world in 2019.

=== Global pandemic ===
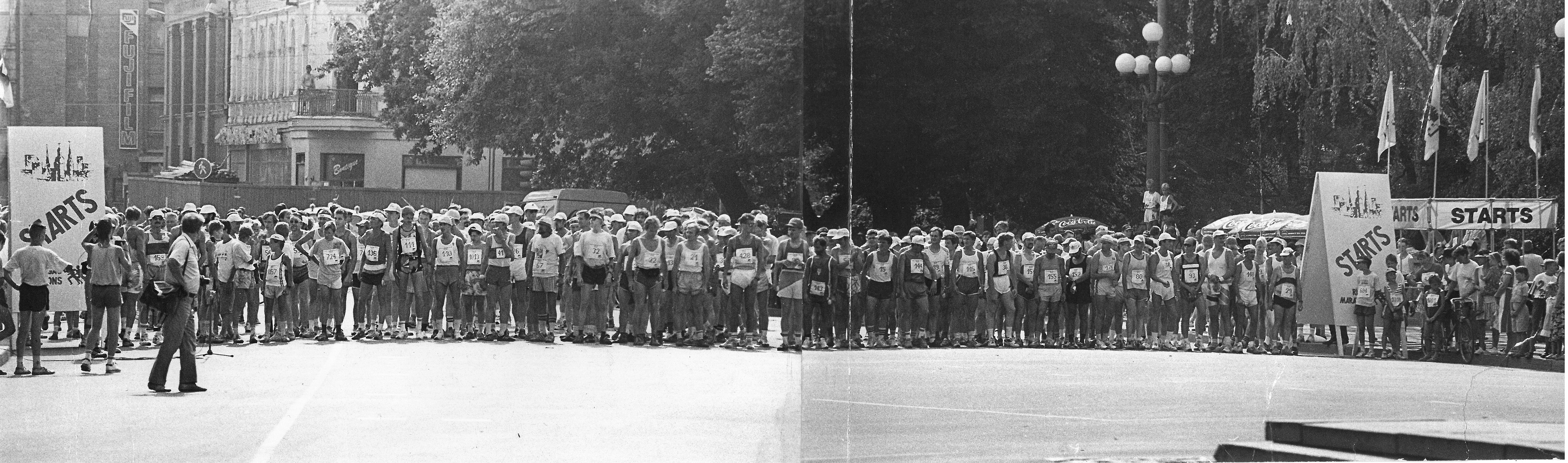
The start of the first Riga International Marathon, on 27 July 1991, at 6:00 p.m., at the Freedom Monument

The long-term partner of the marathon, Rimi, took on the title sponsor duties in 2019, providing support to the Virtual Running Club established during the COVID-19 pandemic, which kept the audience of the event active during the pandemic.

In 2020, due to the coronavirus pandemic, the Latvian Cabinet of Ministers canceled the in-person competition the day before the marathon weekend and moved the marathon to a virtual mode. (Note: It had initially been postponed to 2020.10.11 before being cancelled, with registrants also having the option of transferring their entry to another runner or to 2021.)

Similarly, the 2021 edition of the race was postponed from the weekend of 16 May to the weekend of 29 August due to the pandemic.

=== World Capital of Road Running in 2023 ===
But the organizers reached a new peak after the end of the coronavirus pandemic, winning the right to hold the first World Athletics Road Running Championships in Riga (World Athletics Road Running Championships Riga 23) on 30 September – 1 October 2023.

2023 Rimi Riga Marathon was a track rehearsal for the World Championships, allowing recreational runners to try out the World Championship courses.

By hosting the inaugural World Athletics Road Running Championships, Riga is to become a symbolic World Capital of Road Running in 2023.

— Sebastian Coe, President of World Athletics

The World Athletics Road Running Championships and the Rimi Riga Marathon, the two biggest running events in the Baltics, had a combined economic impact of €11,803,000 on Latvia in 2023, according to a study that examined their effects on the country's economy.

For the first time since the epidemic, the two major running competitions, the Rimi Riga Marathon and the World Athletics Road Running Championships, brought together a record-breaking 38,660 participants from more than 100 nations in the capital of Latvia.

=== 35th Anniversary Marathon (2025) ===
The 2025 Rimi Riga Marathon marked the 35th edition of the event and set a new participation record with 40,122 runners, including 6,017 international participants from 109 countries. Jeļena Prokopčuka completed her final elite marathon, finishing second among Latvian women (2:51:00).

According to a study, the 2025 Rimi Riga Marathon had an economic impact of €16,759,900 on Riga, including €7,460,700 directed to the accommodation and catering sectors and €2,481,800 in tax revenues from foreign visitors.

== Course ==
The start and finish line of the marathon is set on the 11 November Embankment next to Riga Castle. The marathon course crosses over the Daugava river via the Vanšu, Stone, and also includes a section that runs next to the Old Riga.

All of the courses are single-lap courses and are fairly flat and mostly features the center of the city.

The 33rd edition of Riga Marathon was a rehearsal for the first World Athletics Road Running Championships, which took place in Riga in 30 September – 1 October. On that occasion, the marathon was held over two laps of the official World Championships half marathon course. The 35th edition in 2025 returned to a single-loop course.

== Winners ==
Key: Course record (in bold)

=== Marathon ===
Ed.	Year	Men's winner	Nationality	Time	Women's winner	Nationality	Time
1	1991	Vladimir Kalenkovich	Soviet Union	2:28:27	Alla Doudayeva	Soviet Union	2:43:53
2	1992	Gusman Abdulin	Kazakhstan	2:21:29	Olga Youdenkova	Belarus	2:47:28
3	1993	Aleksandrs Prokopčuks	Latvia	2:26:41	Svetlana Șepelev-Tcaci	Moldova	2:55:07
4	1994	Normunds Ivzāns	Latvia	2:43:09	Laila Ceika	Latvia	3:19:56
5	1995	Ziedonis Zaļkalns	Latvia	2:32:44	Galina Bernat	Estonia	3:02:11
6	1996	Aleksandrs Prokopčuks	Latvia	2:31:46	Inita Drēziņa	Latvia	3:30:42
7	1997	Normunds Fedotovskis	Latvia	2:33:05	Kaja Mulla	Estonia	3:12:26
8	1998	Ziedonis Zaļkalns	Latvia	2:33:41	Laila Ceika	Latvia	3:27:49
9	1999	Arūnas Balčunas	Lithuania	2:37:10	Laila Ceika	Latvia	3:37:21
10	2000	Ziedonis Zaļkalns	Latvia	2:30:59	Aušra Kavalauskiene	Lithuania	3:12:11
11	2001	Ziedonis Zaļkalns	Latvia	2:27:25	Laila Ceika	Latvia	3:11:45
12	2002	Arūnas Balčunas	Lithuania	2:31:25	Anita Liepiņa	Latvia	3:12:16
13	2003	Arūnas Balčunas	Lithuania	2:28:07	Aušra Kavalauskiene	Lithuania	3:05:26
14	2004	Dmitrijs Sļesarenoks	Latvia	2:27:09	Modesta Drungiliene	Lithuania	2:58:29
15	2005	Vjačeslavs Bambāns	Latvia	2:45:58	Kaja Mulla	Estonia	3:11:09
16	2006	Yuri Vinogradov	Russia	2:41:57	Laura Zariņa	Latvia	3:04:31
17	2007	Johnstone Changwony	Kenya	2:18:30	Ludmila Rodina	Russia	2:50:07
18	2008	Sammy Rotich	Kenya	2:16:42	Kaja Vals	Estonia	3:13:54
19	2009	Oleg Gur	Belarus	2:18:35	Katsiaryna Dziamidava	Belarus	2:47:30
20	2010	Slimani Benazzouz	Morocco	2:17:33	Maryna Damantsevich	Belarus	2:38:16
21	2011	Julius Kuto	Kenya	2:15:48	Desta Tadesse	Ethiopia	2:37:14
22	2012	Titus Kurgat	Kenya	2:16:53	Iraida Aleksandrova	Russia	2:37:37
23	2013	Duncan Koech	Kenya	2:15:34	Aberash Nesga	Ethiopia	2:40:30
24	2014	Yu Chiba	Japan	2:13:44	Tigist Teshome	Ethiopia	2:36:51
25	2015	Haile Tolossa	Ethiopia	2:12:28	Meseret Eshetu	Ethiopia	2:37:03
26	2016	Dominic Kangor	Kenya	2:11:45	Shitaye Gemechu	Ethiopia	2:38:40
27	2017	Joseph Munywoki	Kenya	2:12:14	Bekelech Bedada	Ethiopia	2:31:22
28	2018	Tsedat Ayana	Ethiopia	2:11:00	Georgina Rono	Kenya	2:28:22
29	2019	Andualem Shiferaw	Ethiopia	**2:08:51**	Birke Debele	Ethiopia	**2:26:18**
30	2020	The marathon was held virtually due to the global pandemic. No comparisons with previous years have been made due to the results' dubious legitimacy.					
31	2021	Kristaps Bērziņš	Latvia	2:38:36	Amanda Krūmiņa	Latvia	3:07:17
32	2022	Deribe Robi	Ethiopia	2:12:07	Aberu Mekuria	Ethiopia	2:30:53
33	2023	Aleksandrs Rascevskis	Latvia	2:25:42	Amanda Krūmiņa	Latvia	2:49:59
34	2024	Daviti Kharazishvili	Georgia	2:21:46	Jaana Strandvall	Finland	2:55:08
35	2025	Melikhaya Frans	South Africa	2:13:20	Ayantu Kumela Tadesse	Ethiopia	2:28:24

=== Half marathon ===
Year	Men's winner	Nationality	Time	Women's winner	Nationality	Time
2006	Viktors Sļesarenoks	Latvia	1:15:20	Anita Liepiņa	Latvia	1:33:43
2007	Dainius Saucikovas	Lithuania	1:09:17	Ilona Marhele	Latvia	1:22:21
2008	Pavel Loskutov	Estonia	1:05:52	Helen Decker	United Kingdom	1:20:00
2009	Joel Komen	Kenya	1:06:49	Daniela Fetcere	Latvia	1:23:05
2010	Valērijs Žolnerovičs	Latvia	1:05:40	Irene Chepkirui	Kenya	1:14:04
2011	Sergei Lukin	Russia	1:06:28	Lyubov Morgunova	Russia	1:15:01
2012	Valērijs Žolnerovičs	Latvia	1:06:04	Jeļena Prokopčuka	Latvia	1:10:27
2013	Jānis Girgensons	Latvia	1:07:24	Jeļena Prokopčuka	Latvia	1:14:39
2014	Ibrahim Mukunga	Kenya	1:05:56	Jeļena Prokopčuka	Latvia	1:14:52
2015	Jānis Girgensons	Latvia	1:06:20	Jeļena Prokopčuka	Latvia	1:13:24
2016	Ibrahim Mukunga	Kenya	1:05:26	Jeļena Prokopčuka	Latvia	1:16:06
2017	Robert Kimaru Magut	Kenya	1:05:04	Inga Zālīte	Latvia	1:23:45
2018	Aleksandr Matviychuk	Ukraine	1:05:14	Milda Vilčinskaite	Lithuania	1:14:38
2019	Jānis Višķers	Latvia	1:05:59	Beatie Deutsch	Israel	1:17:34
2020	The marathon was held virtually due to the global pandemic. No comparisons with previous years have been made due to the results' dubious legitimacy.					
2021	Jānis Višķers	Latvia	1:07:10	Kadi Kõiv	Estonia	1:20:11
2022	Sikiyas Misganaw	Ethiopia	1:00:30	Beatrice Mutai	Kenya	1:09:12
2023	Dmitrijs Serjogins	Latvia	1:05:02	Ilona Marhele	Latvia	1:20:56
2024	Samwel Mailu	Kenya	**1:00:21**	Judy Kemboi	Kenya	**1:07:13**
2025	Abera Mamo	Ethiopia	**1:01:42**	Domenika Mayer	Germany	**1:09:50**

=== By country ===
Note: Marathon and Half Marathon statistics only

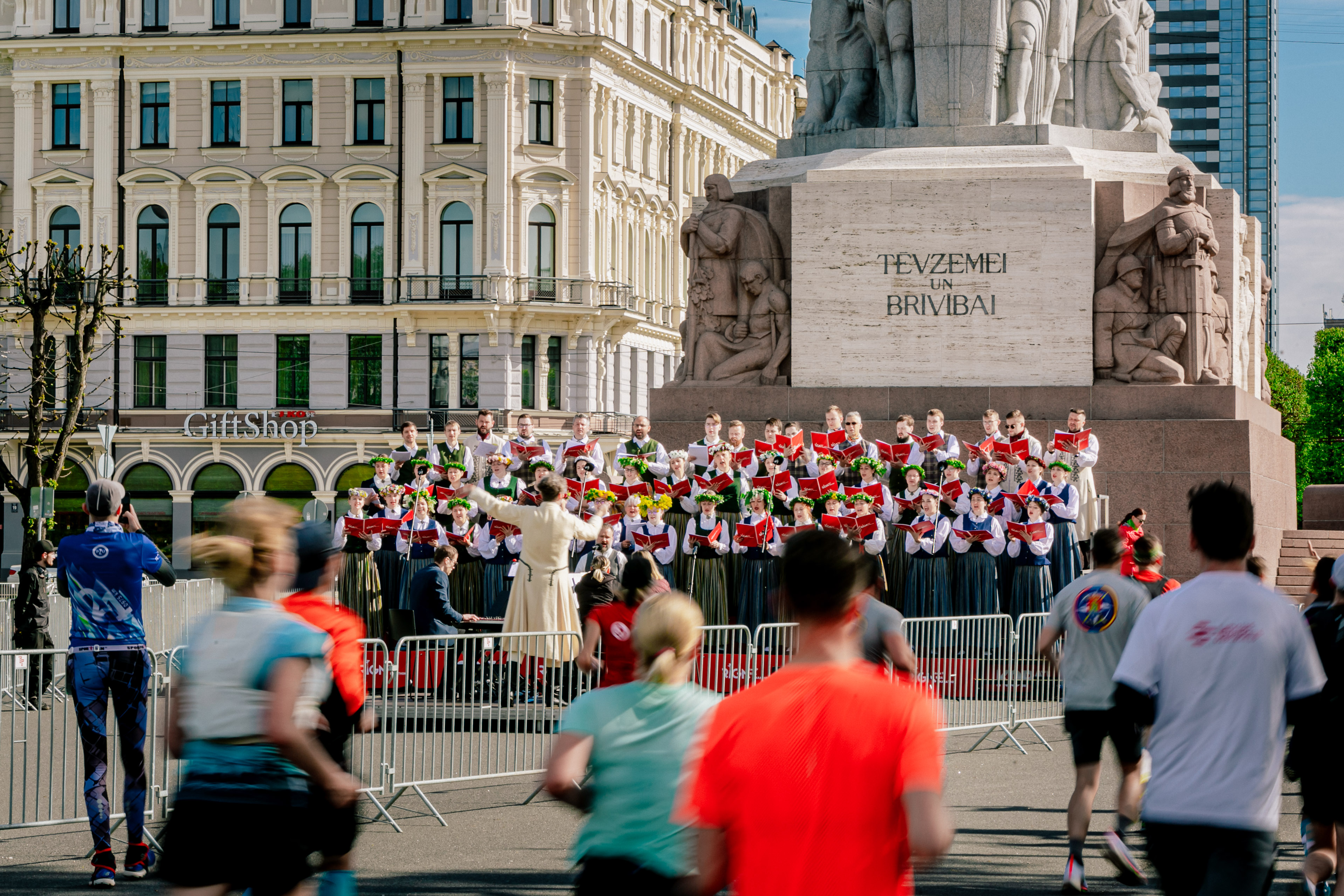
Latvian folk music choir singing for the marathons participants at Freedom monument, 2022.

Country	Total	Marathon (men's)	Marathon (women's)	Half Marathon (men's)	Half Marathon (women's)
Latvia	43	13	10	9	11
Kenya	21	8	2	7	4
Ethiopia	19	7	10	2	0
Lithuania	7	3	2	1	1
Estonia	6	0	3	1	2
Russia	5	1	2	1	1
Belarus	5	2	3	0	0
South Africa	1	1	0	0	0
Georgia	1	1	0	0	0
Finland	1	0	1	0	0
Great Britain	1	0	0	0	1
Israel	1	0	0	0	1
Japan	1	1	0	0	0
Kazakhstan	1	1	0	0	0
Moldova	1	0	1	0	0
Morocco	1	1	0	0	0
Ukraine	1	0	0	1	0
Germany	1	0	0	0	1

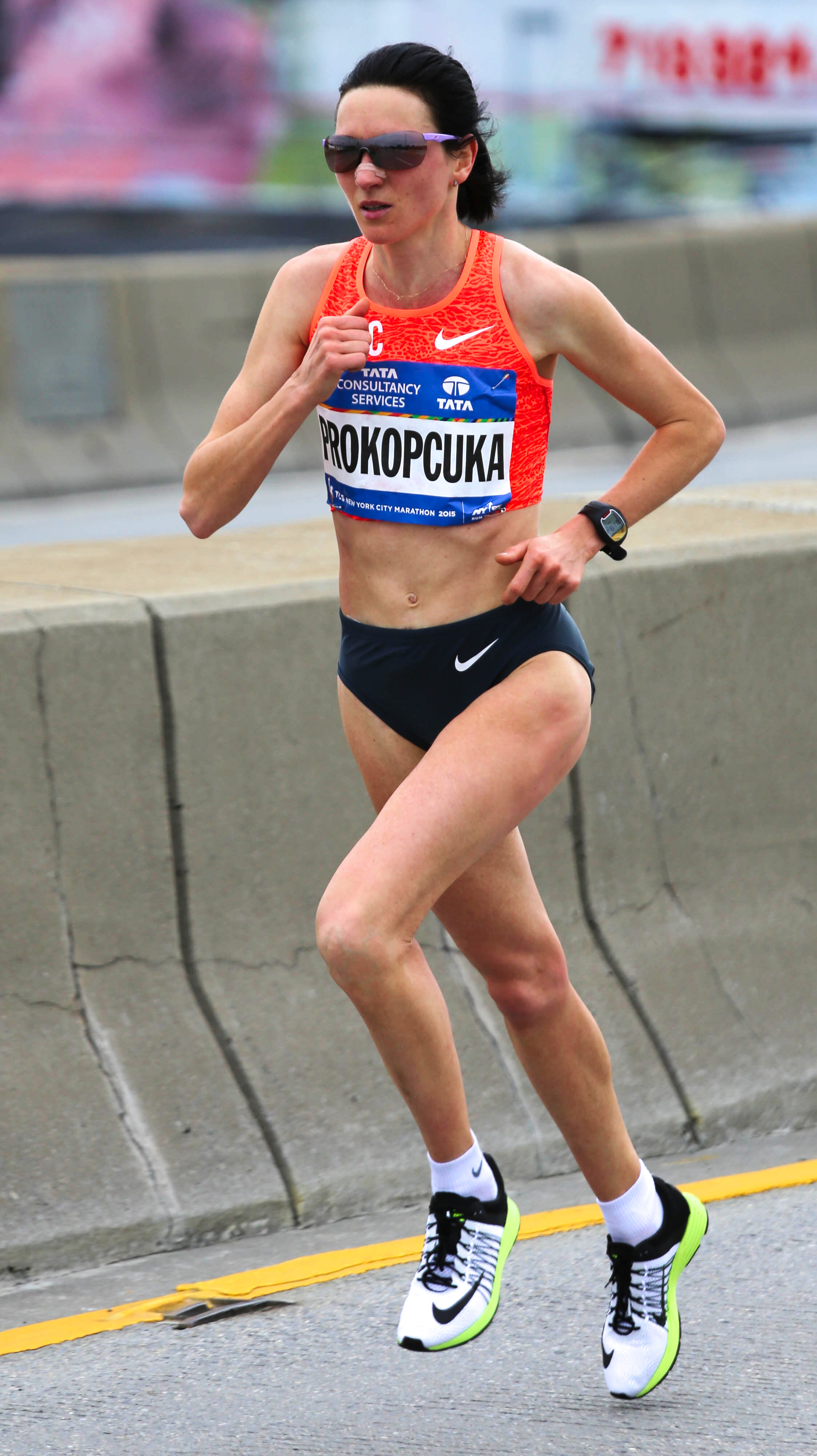
Five time Riga Half Maraton winner Jeļena Prokopčuka, running New York City Marathon, 2015.

=== Multiple wins ===
Note: Marathon and Half Marathon statistics only

Athlete	Country	Wins	Years	Distance
Jeļena Prokopčuka	Latvia	5	2012, 2013, 2014, 2015, 2016	Half Marathon
Laila Ceika	Latvia	4	1994, 1998, 1999, 2001	Marathon
Ziedonis Zaļkalns	Latvia	4	1995, 1998, 2000, 2001	Marathon
Arūnas Balčunas	Lithuania	3	1999, 2002, 2003	Marathon
Aleksandrs Prokopčuks	Latvia	2	1993, 1996	Marathon
Aušra Kavalauskiene	Lithuania	2	2000, 2003	Marathon
Valērijs Žolnerovičs	Latvia	2	2010, 2012	Half Marathon
Jānis Girgensons	Latvia	2	2013, 2015	Half Marathon
Jānis Višķers	Latvia	2	2019, 2021	Half Marathon
Amanda Krūmiņa	Latvia	2	2021, 2023	Marathon
Ilona Marhele	Latvia	2	2007, 2023	Half Marathon
Ibrahim Mukunga	Kenya	2	2014, 2016	Half Marathon

== Official marathon shirts and medals ==
The official shirts of the marathon have been created since the 2008 Riga marathon. Each year, one of Latvia's well-known artists is entrusted with creating a different design for the marathon's official running shirts and medals.

Artists who have created designs for Riga Marathon shirts – Andris Vītoliņš, Ieva Iltnere, Ritums Ivanovs, Elita Patmalniece, Ella Kruļanska, Krišs Salmanis, Ilmārs Blumbergs, Raimonds Staprāns, Anna Heinrihsone, Maija Kurševa, Gustavs Klucis (the 2018 shirt design used the artwork of G. Klucis, which was bought at an auction on 18 November 2017, specially for the Latvian centenary marathon shirt), MARE&ROLS and Jānis Šneiders.

In 2019, the design of the marathon medals was created by Artūrs Analts, the recipient of the main award "Best Design" at the London Design Biennale. The design of the 30th anniversary medals of the marathon was created by the Japanese artist Junichi Kawanishi, who is also the author of the Tokyo Olympic Games medals.

The designs of the 2022 Riga Marathon shirts and medals were created by the head of the painting department of the Art Academy of Latvia, associate professor Kristiāns Brekte. In 2023 all finishers received medals designed by Latvia's most famous graphic artist, Paulis Liepa.

For the 34th edition of the Riga Marathon the artist crafting both the marathon's medals and the official running shirt is the globally recognized talent, Latvian artist Germans Ermičs.

== Historical titles ==
During the valuable history of the Riga Marathon, it has been supported by many different Latvian-based and international companies. Until 2006, the name of the marathon was the International Riga Marathon, when the organizational leadership changed, the word "International" was removed from the name.

- 1994 – 1996: International Radio SWH Riga Marathon
- 2000: International Riga Samsung Marathon
- 2003 – 2004: Riga Maxima International Marathon
- 2006: Riga Parex marathon
- 2007 – 2013: Nordea Riga Marathon
- 2014 – 2018: Lattelecom Riga Marathon
- 2019: Tet Riga Marathon
- since 2020: Rimi Riga Marathon

== Organizers ==
Since 2007, the Riga Marathon has been organized by the agency "Nords Event Communications" ("NECom") in cooperation with the Riga City Council.

In addition to the Rimi Riga Marathon, the same organizing team was in charge of the inaugural World Athletics Road Running Championships in Riga on October 1.
