= Kuldīga Half Marathon =

Latvian athletics competition

- Date: August
- Location: Kuldīga, Latvia
- Event type: road
- Distance: Half marathon
- Established: 2006
- Course records: Half marathon (Latvia) V. Žolnerovičs 1:06:17 (M; 2011) (Latvia) J. Prokopčuka 1:12:52 (F; 2013)
- Website: http://www.kuldigas-pusmaratons.lv/

Kuldīga Half Marathon is an annual road marathon, held in Kuldīga, Latvia. The main sponsor of the marathon is SEB. It is also the Latvian championship in half marathon.

It is known as a tough half marathon - usually the weather in the old city's streets is rather hot, the track has many curves and most of the streets in the city are cobblestoned.

== Winners ==
Key: Course record

Year	Men's winner	Nationality	Time (h:m:s)	Women's winner	Nationality	Time (h:m:s)
2017	Valērijs Žolnerovičs	Latvia	1:09:23	Anita Kažemāka	Latvia	1:24:13
2016	Dmitrijs Serjogins	Latvia	1:08:02	Jolanta Liepiņa	Latvia	1:23:32
2015	Jānis Višķers	Latvia	1:07:13	Ilona Marhele	Latvia	1:19:00
2014	Dmitrijs Serjogins	Latvia	1:10:28	Anita Kažemāka	Latvia	1:20:05
2013	Valērijs Žolnerovičs	Latvia	1:06:53	Jeļena Prokopčuka	Latvia	1:12:52
2012	Marius Diliunas	Lithuania	1:09:23	Jeļena Prokopčuka	Latvia	1:14:29
2011	Valērijs Žolnerovičs	Latvia	1:06:17	Diana Lobačevskė	Lithuania	1:15:08
2010	Stsiapan Rahautsou	Belarus	1:09:02	Jeļena Prokopčuka	Latvia	1:19:30
2009	Stsiapan Rahautsou	Belarus	1:06:58	Jeļena Ābele	Latvia	1:19:53
2008	Mareks Florošeks	Latvia	1:09:08	Jeļena Prokopčuka	Latvia	1:15:57
2007	Dainius Saucikovas	Lithuania	1:12:57	Živilė Balčiūnaitė	Lithuania	1:18:26
2006	Viktors Slesarenoks	Latvia	1:08:22	Jeļena Prokopčuka	Latvia	1:13:36
