= Vilnius Marathon =

Annual road marathon event in Lithuania

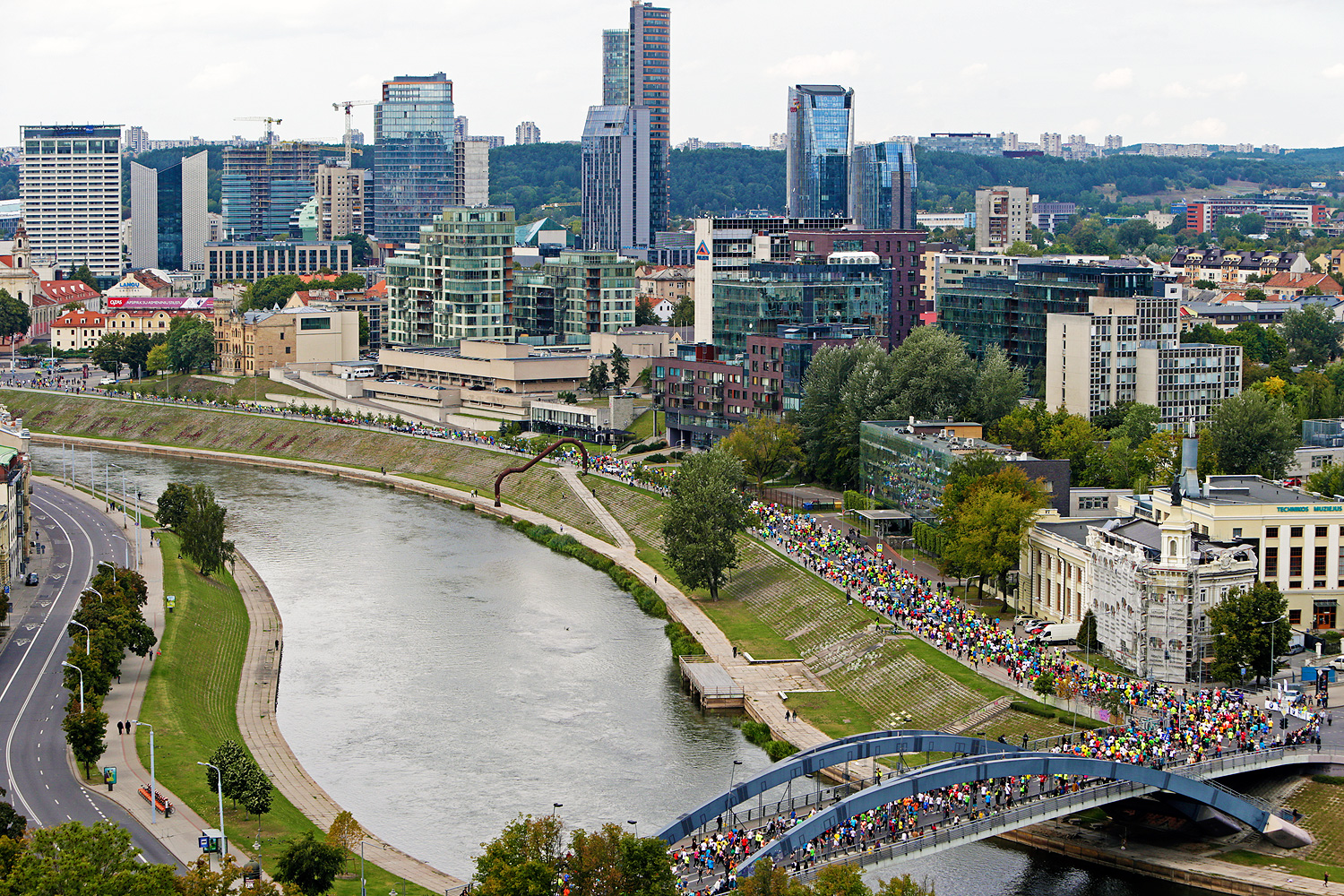
- Date: 2025 September 14th
- Location: Vilnius
- Event type: Road
- Distance: Marathon, Half marathon, 10k, 5k, Kids run
- Primary sponsor: Rimi
- Established: 2004 (Marathon); 2006 (Half marathon)
- Course records: Marathon: Men: (Latvia) Dmitrijs Serjogins 2:19:49; Women: (Lithuania) Diana Lobačevskė 2:39:40; Half Marathon: Men: (Latvia) Dmitrijs Serjogins 1:05:13; Women: (Lithuania) Diana Lobačevskė 1:13:59
- Website: Official website
- Participants: 1,684 finishers (2021); 6,659 (2020)

The Swedbank Vilnius Marathon is an annual road marathon event, held in Vilnius, Lithuania. The main sponsor of the marathon is Swedbank. Race offers marathon, half marathon, 10k, 5k and children run experience.

The course includes beautiful places in Vilnius: Vilnius Old Town, Vingis Park, riverbank of Neris, and even forest in Valakampiai. The start and finish line is near the Cathedral Square in the very heart of Vilnius.

The event is organized by the Public Institution "Tarptautinis Maratonas". This institution also organizes other endurance sports events – Trakai triathlon, Vilnius Women Run, and Vilnius Christmas run.

== History ==
The first Vilnius Marathon was launched in 1990. After few pauses and difficulties, it reached 2001, when the Lithuanian Athletic Federation organised the first mass run (Maxima Cup), which became the predecessor of the Vilnius Marathon. Longest distance in 2001 was 10 kilometers.

Full distance of the full marathon (42 km 195 metres) was launched on September 11, 2004. This day started new history of Vilnius, when more than 200 professional and non-professional runners from 10 countries participated in the event.

Half Marathon distance was added to the programme in 2006. Quarter marathon was introduced in 2012.

In 2007, Vilnius Marathon became a member of AIMS. From that moment full marathon course was always certified.

This event tripled the number of participants between 2012 and 2015. In 2012 there were over 5000 runners, while 16424 runners ran the marathon event in 2015.

The Vilnius marathon course record of 2:19:49 was set by Dmitrijs Serjogins from Latvia in 2020. The women's record of 2:39:40 was set by Diana Lobačevskė during the 2020 Vilnius marathon.

== Results ==
Year	Event	Prizewinners					
Year	Event	Gold	Result	Silver	Result	Bronze	Result
2025	Men's marathon	(Lithuania) Lukas Tarasevičius	2:28:33	(Lithuania) Modestas Dirsė	2:28:50	(Lithuania) Andrej Jegorov	2:31:45
2025	Women's marathon	(Lithuania) Modesta Bužerytė	2:55:23	(Lithuania) Milda Eimontė	2:57:37	(Lithuania) Monika Bytautienė	2:57:37
2025	Men's half marathon	(Lithuania) Remigijus Kančys	1:11:02	(Lithuania) Aleliūnas Vilius	1:11:06	(Lithuania) Žūsinaitė-Nekrošienė Vaida	1:16:02
2025	Women's half marathon	(Lithuania) Vaida Žūsinaitė-Nekriošienė	1:16:02	(Lithuania) Jegelevičiūtė Laura	1:20:52	(Lithuania) Varnagirytė Viktorija	1:23:48
2024	Men's marathon	(Lithuania) Lukas Tarasevičius	2:25:02	(Lithuania) Andrius Jakševičius	2:26:39	(Lithuania) Modestas Dirsė	2:31:24
2024	Women's marathon	(Lithuania) Milda Eimontė	2:47:20	(Lithuania) Lina Vasiljevienė	2:50:15	(Lithuania) Laura Jegelevičiūtė	2:51:03
2024	Men's half marathon	(Morocco) Ayoub Bouras	1:07:41	(Lithuania) Egidijus Adomkaitis	1:10:15	(Lithuania) Marius Ignotas	1:11:19
2024	Women's half marathon	(Lithuania) Kamilė Vaidžiulytė	1:20:37	(Lithuania) Vaida Nakrošiūtė	1:22:44	(Lithuania) Monika Naskauskė	1:23:13
2023	Men's marathon	(Poland) Dawid Garski	2:25:42	(Lithuania) Andrius Preibys	2:31:21	(Lithuania) Tomas Bizimavičius	2:33:58
2023	Women's marathon	(Lithuania) Inga Bartkė	2:58:02	(Lithuania) Gitana Akmanavičiūtė	3:04:10	(Norway) Synnøve Aune	2:51:03
2023	Men's half marathon	(Latvia) Dmitrijs Serjogins	1:06:31	(Lithuania) Lukas Tarasevičius	1:09:19	(Lithuania) Aurimas Rimkus	1:10:09
2023	Women's half marathon	(Lithuania) Loreta Kančytė	1:21:39	(Ukraine) Veronika Kalashnikova	1:22:46	(Lithuania) Laura Vaitkevičienė	1:24:13
2022	Men's marathon	(Lithuania) Modestas Dirsė	2:27:28	(Lithuania) Justinas Čekanauskas	2:37:12	(Lithuania) Darius Škarnulis	2:39:09
2022	Women's marathon	(Lithuania) Neringa Songailaitė-Kovarskienė	2:57:12	(Lithuania) Gitana Akmanavičiūtė	3:00:57	(Lithuania) Zita Kosač	3:02:01
2022	Men's half marathon	(Latvia) Dmitrijs Serjogins	1:08:12	(Lithuania) Egidijus Adomkaitis	1:08:15	(Lithuania) Lukas Tarasevičius	1:09:48
2022	Women's half marathon	(Lithuania) Vaida Žūsinaitė-Nekriošienė	1:16:48	(Ukraine) Diana Banienė	1:19:19	(Lithuania) Lina Kiriliuk	1:19:43
2021	Men's marathon	(Lithuania) Lukas Tarasevičius	2:27:50	(Lithuania) Aurimas Rimkus	2:34:41	(Lithuania) Remigijus Šnioka	2:35:23
2021	Women's marathon	(Lithuania) Gitana Akmanavičiūtė	2:54:40	(Lithuania) Neringa Songailaitė-Kovarskienė	3:02:59	(Lithuania) Vilmantė Stašauskaitė	3:12:30
2021	Men's half marathon	(Latvia) Dmitrijs Serjogins	1:06:30	(Lithuania) Modestas Dirsė	1:11:01	(Lithuania) Lukas Budavičius	1:14:37
2021	Women's half marathon	(Lithuania) Loreta Kančytė	1:15:14	(Lithuania) Vaida Žūsinaitė-Nekrošienė	1:17:56	(Lithuania) Diana Banienė	1:21:22
2020	Men's marathon	(Latvia) Dmitrijs Serjogins	2:19:49	(Lithuania) Andrius Jakševičius	2:26:00	(Lithuania) Jonas Vytautas Gvildys	2:27:07
2020	Women's marathon	(Lithuania) Diana Lobačevskė	2:39:40	(Lithuania) Lina Kiriliuk	2:51:25	(Lithuania) Gitana Akmanavičiūtė	2:58:00
2020	Men's half marathon	(Lithuania) Remigijus Kančys	1:05:47	(Lithuania) Ignas Brasevičius	1:05:55	(Lithuania) Lukas Tarasevičius	1:11:19
2020	Women's half marathon	(Lithuania) Vaida Žūsinaitė-Nekrošienė	1:15:58	(Lithuania) Loreta Kančytė	1:16:16	(Lithuania) Viktorija Varnagirytė	1:18:26
2019	Men's marathon	(Ukraine) Bohdan Semenovych	2:22:02	(Lithuania) Andrius Jakševičius	2:26:36	(Lithuania) Aurimas Rimkus	2:30:17
2019	Women's marathon	(Ukraine) Nataliya Semenovych	2:49:50	(Belarus) Alena Shumik	3:01:22	(Belarus) Yuliya Skiruk	3:05:59
2019	Men's half marathon	(Latvia) Dmitrijs Serjogins	1:05:13	(Lithuania) Remigijus Kančys	1:05:27	(Lithuania) Ignas Brasevičius	1:05:58
2019	Women's half marathon	(Lithuania) Loreta Kančytė	1:15:31	(Lithuania) Diana Lobačevskė	1:16:01	(Lithuania) Monika Bytautienė	1:16:34
2018	Men's marathon	(Ukraine) Bohdan Semenovych	2:24:23	(Ukraine) Taras Salo	2:25:14	(Belarus) Dzmitry Hryhoryeu	2:25:30
2018	Women's marathon	(Ukraine) Nataliia Semenovych	2:47:56	(Latvia) Lina Kiriliuk	2:50:28	(Belarus) Alena Shumik	2:59:15
2018	Men's half marathon	(Lithuania) Valdas Dopolskas	1:07:32	(Latvia) Dmitrijs Serjogins	1:08:30	(Lithuania) Lukas Tarasevičius	1:12:12
2018	Women's half marathon	(Ukraine) Oksana Raita	1:17:22	(Lithuania) Loreta Kančytė	1:18:08	(Lithuania) Remalda Kergytė-Dauskurdienė	1:21:13
2017	Men's marathon	(Belarus) Dzmitry Hryhoryeu	02:26:58	(Russia) Vaislij Leminskij	02:28:55	(Lithuania) Andrius Jaksevičius	02:35:21
2017	Women's marathon	(Ukraine) Maria Hudak	02:48:58	(Russia) Elizaveta Pogudo	02:52:26	(Belarus) Alena Shumik	3:02:42
2017	Men's half marathon	(Lithuania) Remigijus Kančys	01:08:10	(Lithuania) Ignas Brasevičius	01:10:51	(Russia) Jurij Vinogradov	01:11:59
2017	Women's half marathon	(Ukraine) Oksana Raita	01:18:56	(Lithuania) Loreta Kančytė	01:20:36	(Lithuania) Vaida Žūsinaitė	01:23:07
2016	Men's marathon	(United States) Christopher Zablocki	02:25:55	(Belarus) Dzmitry Hryhoryeu	02:26:09	(Lithuania) Vilius Aleliūnas	02:33:09
2016	Women's marathon	(Lithuania) Loreta Petkevičienė	03:02:31	(Lithuania) Alionka Kornijenko	03:08:20	(Belarus) Alena Shumik	03:10:38
2016	Men's half marathon	(Lithuania) Valdas Dopolskas	01:07:40	(Lithuania) Artūras Meška	01:14:29	(Lithuania) Jonas Gvildys	01:14:54
2016	Women's half marathon	(Lithuania) Diana Lobačevskė	01:14:57	(Lithuania) Milda Vilčinskaitė	01:17:08	(Lithuania) Lina Batulevičiūtė	01:26:01
2015	Men's marathon	(Ethiopia) Teklu Metaferia	2:26:40	(Lithuania) Andrej Jegorov	2:31:20	(Lithuania) Ruslanas Seitkalijevas	2:35:56
2015	Women's marathon	(Lithuania) Loreta Bliujienė	3:06:08	(Lithuania) Alionka Kornijenko	3:12:15	(Lithuania) Jolita Kurtinaitienė	3:13:15
2015	Men's half marathon	(Lithuania) Valdas Dopolskas	1:07:26	(Lithuania) Ignas Brasevičius	1:07:57	(Belarus) Dzmitry Hryhoryeu	1:09:04
2015	Women's half marathon	(Lithuania) Milda Vilčinskaitė	1:16:44	(Lithuania) Monika Vilčinskaitė	1:19:23	(Lithuania) Božena Gruzd	1:22:43
2014	Men's marathon	(Lithuania) Remigijus Kančys	2:23:41	(Poland) Artur Kern	2:25:46	(Lithuania) Ignas Brasevičius	2:30:51
2014	Women's marathon	(Lithuania) Vaida Žūsinaitė	2:43:13	(Ukraine) Nataliya Hryhoryeva	3:59:33	(Lithuania) Austėja Miežytė	3:07:41
2014	Men's half marathon	(Lithuania) Darius Sadeckas	1:09:13	(Lithuania) Vilius Aleliūnas	1:12:14	(Ukraine) Serhii Popov	1:12:45
2014	Women's half marathon	(Lithuania) Rasa Drazdauskaitė	1:17:29	(Lithuania) Milda Vilčinskaitė	1:20:57	(Lithuania) Monika Gotcaitytė	1:31:20
2013	Men's marathon	(Lithuania) Tomas Venckūnas	2:27:01	(Lithuania) Aurimas Skinulis	2:29:17	(Poland) Lukasz Panfil	2:33:38
2013	Women's marathon	(Norway) Margrethe Løgavlen	2:55:45	(Ukraine) Anastasia Bulavintceva	3:10:26	(Lithuania) Renata Siliuk	3:11:05
2013	Men's half marathon	(Kenya) Wachira Ibrahim Mukunga	1:05:50	(Lithuania) Marius Diliūnas	1:08:21	(Lithuania) Nerijus Markauskas	1:13:52
2013	Women's half marathon	(Lithuania) Diana Lobačevskė	1:13:59	(Lithuania) Vaida Žūsinaitė	1:15:51	(Lithuania) Monika Vilčinskaitė	1:20:45
2012	Men's marathon	(Lithuania) Tomas Venckūnas	2:26:55	(Poland) Krzysztof Bartkiewicz	2:31:22	(Belarus) Dzmitry Hryhoryeu	2:33:49
2012	Women's marathon	(Ukraine) Anastasia Bulavintceva	3:06:06	(Lithuania) Modesta Kaminskienė	3:15:53	(Lithuania) Renata Siliuk	3:16:37
2012	Men's half marathon	(Lithuania) Remigijus Kančys	1:10:02	(Italy) Massimiliano Brigo	1:10:31	(Lithuania) Vaidas Žlabys	1:15:41
2012	Women's half marathon	(Lithuania) Diana Lobačevskė	1:15:23	(Lithuania) Milda Vilčinskaitė	1:22:53	(Poland) Diana Golek	1:30:38
2011	Men's marathon	(Belarus) Dzmitry Hryhoryeu	2:34:40	(Lithuania) Saulius Valaitis	2:35:09	(Lithuania) Tomas Venckūnas	2:37:34
2011	Women's marathon	(Lithuania) Modesta Kaminskienė	3:07:28	(Lithuania) Sada Bukšnienė	3:18:11	(Lithuania) Renata Siliuk	3:20:51
2011	Men's half marathon	(Lithuania) Darius Sadeckas	1:09:34	(Lithuania) Aurimas Skinulis	1:09:49	(Lithuania) Jonas Vytaustas Gvildys	1:11:20
2011	Women's half marathon	(Lithuania) Gailutė Keliuotienė	1:31:25	(Lithuania) Olga Ziuganova	1:34:06	(Lithuania) Giedrė Kazlauskaitė	1:34:45
2010	Men's marathon	(Lithuania) Tomas Venckūnas	2:37:27	(Lithuania) Antanas Žukauskas	2:35:09	(Lithuania) Tadas Kavaliauskas	2:41:24
2010	Women's marathon	(Lithuania) Modesta Kaminskienė	3:14:36	(Lithuania) Sada Bukšnienė	3:18:11	(United Kingdom) Ausrine Ward	3:40:48
2010	Men's half marathon	(Lithuania) Aurimas Skinulis	1:08:28	(Lithuania) Darius Sadeckas	1:09:49	(Lithuania) Konstantinas Tichonovas	1:14:55
2010	Women's half marathon	(Lithuania) Diana Lobačevskė	1:14:09	(Lithuania) Monika Vilčinskaitė	1:34:06	(Lithuania) Renata Siliuk	1:36:04
2009	Men's marathon	(Lithuania) Darius Škarnulis	2:33:16	(Lithuania) Tomas Venckūnas	2:36:05	(Latvia) Ivar Valtass	2:41:54
2009	Women's marathon	(Lithuania) Vilija Damašickienė	3:13:53	(Australia) Anna Beattie	3:30:45	(Lithuania) Karina Onufrijeva	3:31:30
2009	Men's half marathon	(Belarus) Stsiapan Rahautsou	1:06:11	(Lithuania) Tomas Matijošius	1:08:49	(Lithuania) Aurimas Skinulis	1:09:57
2009	Women's half marathon	(Lithuania) Diana Lobačevskė	1:17:01	(Germany) Nicole Böhm	1:26:25	(Lithuania) Olga Ziuganova	1:32:47
2008	Men's marathon	(Lithuania) Kęstutis Jankūnas	2:28:42	(Poland) Marek Dzilgielewski	2:35:28	(Lithuania) Darius Škarnulis	2:37:22
2008	Women's marathon	(Lithuania) Diana Lobačevskė	2:45:31	(Lithuania) Justina Jasutytė	2:46:45	(Estonia) Kaja Vals	3:17:00
2008	Men's half marathon	(Lithuania) Mindaugas Viršilas	1:11:26	(Lithuania) Andrius Ramonas	1:11:41	(Lithuania) Petras Pranckūnas	1:13:16
2008	Women's half marathon	(Lithuania) Živilė Balčiūnaitė	1:14:53	(Lithuania) Regina Čistiakova	1:29:08	(Lithuania) Renata Siliuk	1:31:39
2007	Men's marathon	(Kenya) Richard Rotich	2:21:15	(Kenya) Reuben Kwambai	2:21:27	(Belarus) Pavel Mashei	2:26:25
2007	Women's marathon	(Belarus) Natalija Chatkina	2:51:19	(Belarus) Volha Yudzinkova	2:51:29	(Lithuania) Modesta Kaminskienė	3:06:52
2007	Men's half marathon	(Lithuania) Nerijus Markauskas	1:10:59	(Lithuania) Mindaugas Viršilas	1:11:49	(Lithuania) Kęstutis Jankūnas	1:12:15
2007	Women's half marathon	(Lithuania) Remalda Kergytė	1:19:13	(Lithuania) Gailutė Keliuotienė	1:27:15	(Lithuania) Regina Čistiakova	1:30:26
2006	Men's marathon	(Belarus) Aleksandr Labuchenko	2:25:17	(Lithuania) Dainius Šaučikovas	2:28:43	(Lithuania) Tomas Venckūnas	2:32:29
2006	Women's marathon	(Lithuania) Modesta Drungilienė	2:55:16	(Belarus) Ala Zadorozhnaja	2:58:32	(Lithuania) Sonata Milušauskaitė	3:02:30
2006	Men's half marathon	(Lithuania) Justinas Križinauskas	1:13:07	(Latvia) Mareks Floroseks	1:14:05	(Latvia) Kaspars Briška	1:14:37
2006	Women's half marathon	(Lithuania) Rasa Drazdauskaitė	1:21:23	(Lithuania) Remalda Kergytė	1:24:23	(Lithuania) Gailutė Keliuotienė	1:29:00
2005	Men's marathon	(Belarus) Aleksandr Labuchenko	2:28:46	(Lithuania) Tomas Venckūnas	2:30:47	(Lithuania) Dainius Šaučikovas	2:31:43
2005	Women's marathon	(Belarus) Alena Vinitskaja	2:46:59	(Lithuania) Modesta Drungilienė	3:02:57	(Belarus) Ylia Bubenko	3:07:43
2004	Men's marathon	(Latvia) Dmitrijs Slesarenoks	2:23:35	(Belarus) Aleksandr Labuchenko	2:24:02	(Lithuania) Česlovas Kundrotas	2:34:20
2004	Women's marathon	(Lithuania) Kristina Saltanovič	2:59:10	(Lithuania) Giedrė Voverienė	3:08:06	(Belarus) Julia Bubenko	3:08:38

Last updated: 2020–01–29.
