= Andualem =

Andualem (Amharic: ዓንዱኣለም) can be both a masculine given name and a surname. Notable people with the name include:

- Andualem Aragie, Ethiopian politician and activist
- Andualem Negusse (born 1985), Ethiopian football midfielder
- Andualem Belay Shiferaw (born 1992), Ethiopian long-distance runner
- Binalf Andualem, Ethiopian ambassador to the United States
