= Juris Grustiņš =

Latvian long-distance runner

Medal record

Men's athletics

Representing Soviet Union

European Indoor Championships
Gold medal – first place	1972 Grenoble	3000 m

Juris Grustiņš (born 22 July 1947) is a Latvian former long-distance runner who competed in track events for the Soviet Union. He is the Latvian national record holder in the 5000 metres with his career best of 13:34.2 minutes.

His greatest achievement was winning a gold medal in the 3000 metres at the 1972 European Athletics Indoor Championships. He was also twice national champion in that event, winning the Soviet Indoor Athletics Championships in 1972 and 1973.

== International competitions ==
Year	Competition	Venue	Position	Event	Notes
1972	European Indoor Championships	Grenoble, France	1st	3000 m	8:02.85

== National titles ==
- Soviet Indoor Athletics Championships
  - 3000 m: 1972, 1973
