= Jeļena Prokopčuka =

Latvian long-distance runner

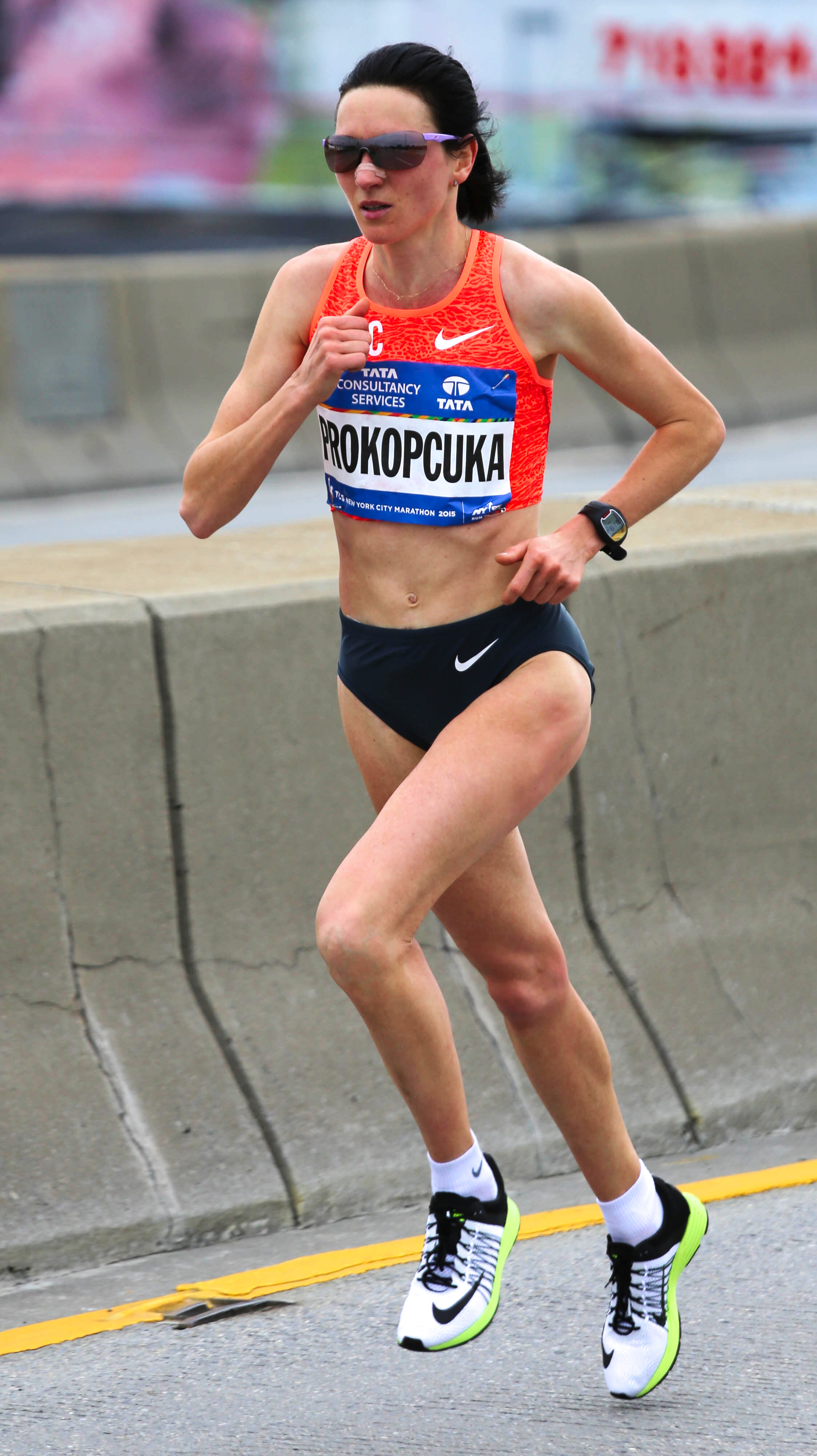
- Prokopčuka at the 2015 New York City Marathon

Personal information
- Born: 21 September 1976 (age 49) Riga, Latvian SSR, Soviet Union
- Height: 168 cm (5 ft 6 in)
- Weight: 52 kg (115 lb)

Sport
- Sport: Athletics

Jeļena Prokopčuka (née Čelnova; born 21 September 1976) is a retired Latvian long-distance runner, best known for winning the New York City Marathon in 2005 and 2006.

== Biography ==
She holds six outdoor and one indoor Latvian record, ranging from 3000 metres to the marathon distance. Her husband, Aleksandrs Prokopčuks, holds the men's Latvian marathon record with 2:15:56 hours. She is a three-time participant at the Summer Olympics, having represented Latvia in track events in 1996, 2000 and 2004.

Prokopčuka won the 2001 Tallinn Marathon. She won the Paris Half Marathon in 2002, 2003 and 2009. She was the 2003 champion at the World Military Cross Country Championships. She won the Great Edinburgh Run three times consecutively from 2005 to 2007. She is also a five-time winner of the Kuldīga Half Marathon, and a two-time winner of the Almond Blossom Cross Country. Elsewhere, she won the 2002 20 Kilomètres de Paris, the Osaka International Ladies Marathon in 2005 (where she ran her national record time of 2:22:56 hours), and the San Silvestre Vallecana in 2006.

She was the top-performing European at the 2012 Lisbon Half Marathon, coming fifth overall. She was tenth at the 2012 London Marathon and won the Riga Half Marathon. She surprised at the Great North Run, leading out the elite women, and although she fell to fourth she ran a national record of 68:09 minutes. Her final outing of the year came at the Yokohama Marathon, where her season's best time of 2:26:55 hours brought her fourth place.

A strong finish at the 2013 Nagoya Marathon saw her climb from 16th to fourth and record a time of 2:25:46 hours – her fastest in six years. She was runner-up to Tirunesh Dibaba at the Great Manchester Run in May.

== Achievements ==
Year	Competition	Venue	Position	Event	Notes
Representing Latvia
1994	World Junior Championships	Lisbon, Portugal	14th (h)	3000m	9:33.67
1994	World Junior Championships	Lisbon, Portugal	13th	10,000m	36:21.59
1997	European U23 Championships	Turku, Finland	5th	5000m	15:55.74
1997	European U23 Championships	Turku, Finland	6th	10,000m	33:41.51
2000	Olympic Games	Sydney, Australia	9th	5000 m	14:55.46
2000	Olympic Games	Sydney, Australia	19th	10,000 m	32:17.72
2001	World Half Marathon Championships	Bristol, England	5th	Half marathon	1:08:43
2002	Paris Half Marathon	Paris, France	1st	Half marathon	1:11:08
2002	European Championships	Munich, Germany	5th	10,000 m	31:17.72
2002	World Half Marathon Championships	Brussels, Belgium	3rd	Half marathon	1:09:15
2003	Paris Half Marathon	Paris, France	1st	Half marathon	1:09:42
2003	World Championships	Paris, France	10th	10,000 m	31:06.14
2004	Boston Marathon	Boston, United States	4th	Marathon	2:30:16
2004	Olympic Games	Athens, Greece	7th	10,000 m	31:04.10
2005	World Championships	Helsinki, Finland	12th	10,000 m	31:04.55
2005	New York City Marathon	New York City, United States	1st	Marathon	2:24:41
2005	Osaka International Ladies Marathon	Osaka, Japan	1st	Marathon	2:22:56
2006	Boston Marathon	Boston, United States	2nd	Marathon	2:23:48
2006	European Championships	Gothenburg, Sweden	6th	10,000 m	30:38.78
2006	New York City Marathon	New York City, United States	1st	Marathon	2:25:05
2006	Kuldīga Half Marathon	Kuldīga, Latvia	1st	Half marathon	1:13:36
2007	Boston Marathon	Boston, United States	2nd	Marathon	2:29:58
2007	New York City Marathon	New York City, United States	3rd	Marathon	2:26:13
2008	Boston Marathon	Boston, United States	4th	Marathon	2:28:12
2008	Kuldīga Half Marathon	Kuldīga, Latvia	1st	Half marathon	1:15:57
2009	Paris Half Marathon	Paris, France	1st	Half marathon	1:10:43
2010	Kuldīga Half Marathon	Kuldīga, Latvia	1st	Half marathon	1:19:30
2012	Riga Marathon	Rīga, Latvia	1st	Half marathon	1:10:27
2013	New York City Marathon	New York City, United States	3rd	Marathon	2:27:47
2013	Riga Marathon	Rīga, Latvia	1st	Half marathon	1:14:39
2014	New York City Marathon	New York City, United States	4th	Marathon	2:26:15
2014	Riga Marathon	Rīga, Latvia	1st	Half marathon	1:14:52
2015	Osaka International Ladies Marathon	Osaka, Japan	1st	Marathon	2:24:07
2015	New York City Marathon	New York City, United States	8th	Marathon	2:28:46
2015	Riga Marathon	Rīga, Latvia	1st	Half marathon	1:13:24
2016	Riga Marathon	Rīga, Latvia	1st	Half marathon	1:16:06

Awards
Preceded by None	Latvian Women's Sportspersonality of the Year; 2005–2007	Succeeded by Anete Jēkabsone-Žogota
