= Valērijs Žolnerovičs =

Latvian athlete

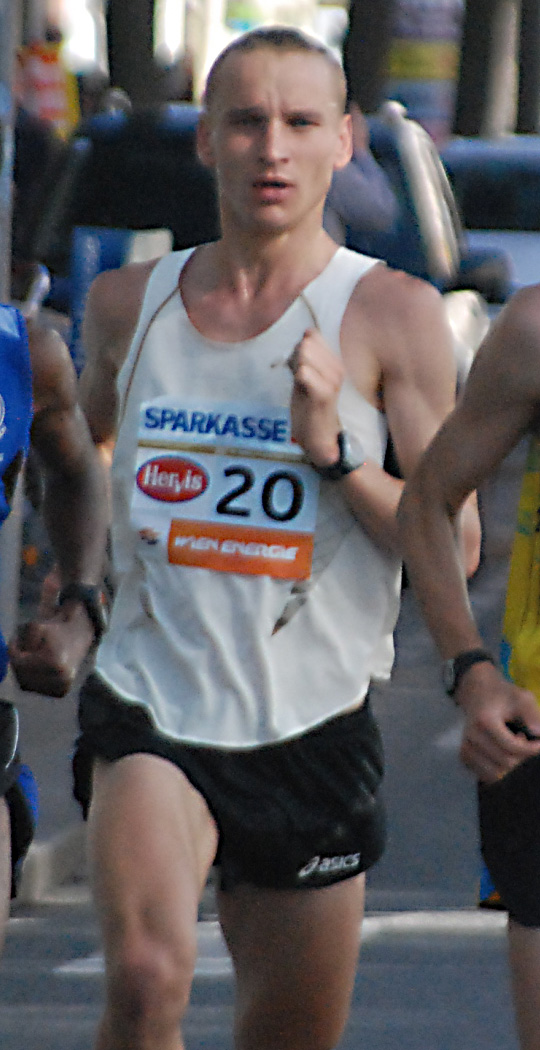

Personal information
- Born: April 19, 1985 (age 41)
- Height: 1.80 m (5 ft 11 in)
- Weight: 66 kg (146 lb)

Sport
- Country: Latvia
- Sport: Athletics
- Event: Marathon

Valērijs Žolnerovičs (born April 19, 1985 in Ventspils) is a Latvian Olympic athlete. He is the current holder of the Latvian record both in marathon and half marathon.

Trained by Dainis Lodiņš, Žolnerovičs finished the 3000m steeplechase at the 2008 Summer Olympics in Beijing with a time of 8:37.65 (32nd overall). In 2010 he won the half marathon distance of Riga Marathon, finishing after 1:05:40 and beating the event record, set by Pavel Loskutov in 2008, by 12 seconds. At the 2011 Lisbon Half Marathon Žolnerovičs broke the Latvian record in half marathon, finishing after 1:04:43.

At the 2013 Frankfurt Marathon Žolnerovičs broke the Latvian record in marathon for the second time, finishing after 2:14:33.

== Achievements ==
Year	Competition	Venue	Position	Event	Notes
Representing Latvia
2004	World Junior Championships	Grosseto, Italy	17th (h)	3000m steeplechase	8:59.58
2005	European U23 Championships	Erfurt, Germany	10th	3000m steeplechase	8:52.34
2007	European U23 Championships	Debrecen, Hungary	10th	3000m steeplechase	9:08.39
2008	Latvian Championships	Valmiera, Latvia	1st	3000 m	8:14.82
2008	Summer Olympics	Beijing, China	32nd	3000 m steeplechase	8:37.65
2010	Riga Marathon	Riga, Latvia	1st	Half marathon	1:05.40
2011	Kuldīga Half Marathon	Kuldīga, Latvia	1st	Half marathon	1:06.17
2012	Riga Marathon	Riga, Latvia	1st	Half marathon	1:06.04
2014	European Athletics Championships	Zurich, Switzerland	12th	Marathon	2:15.56
