= Julius Kuto =

Kenyan long-distance runner

Julius Kipruto Kuto (born 1984) is a male long-distance runner from Kenya. His personal best is 2:12:23 achieved at 2010 Hannover Marathon.

== Achievements ==
| Year | Competition | Venue | Position | Event | Notes |
Representing Kenya
| 2006 | Utrecht Marathon | Utrecht, Netherlands | 7th | Marathon | 2:16:21 |
| 2008 | Leiden Marathon | Leiden, Netherlands | 1st | Half Marathon | 1:03.19 |
| 2010 | Hannover Marathon | Hannover, Germany | 8th | Marathon | 2:12:23 |
| 2011 | Riga Marathon | Riga, Latvia | 1st | Marathon | 2:15:48 |
