= Vilnius Women Run =

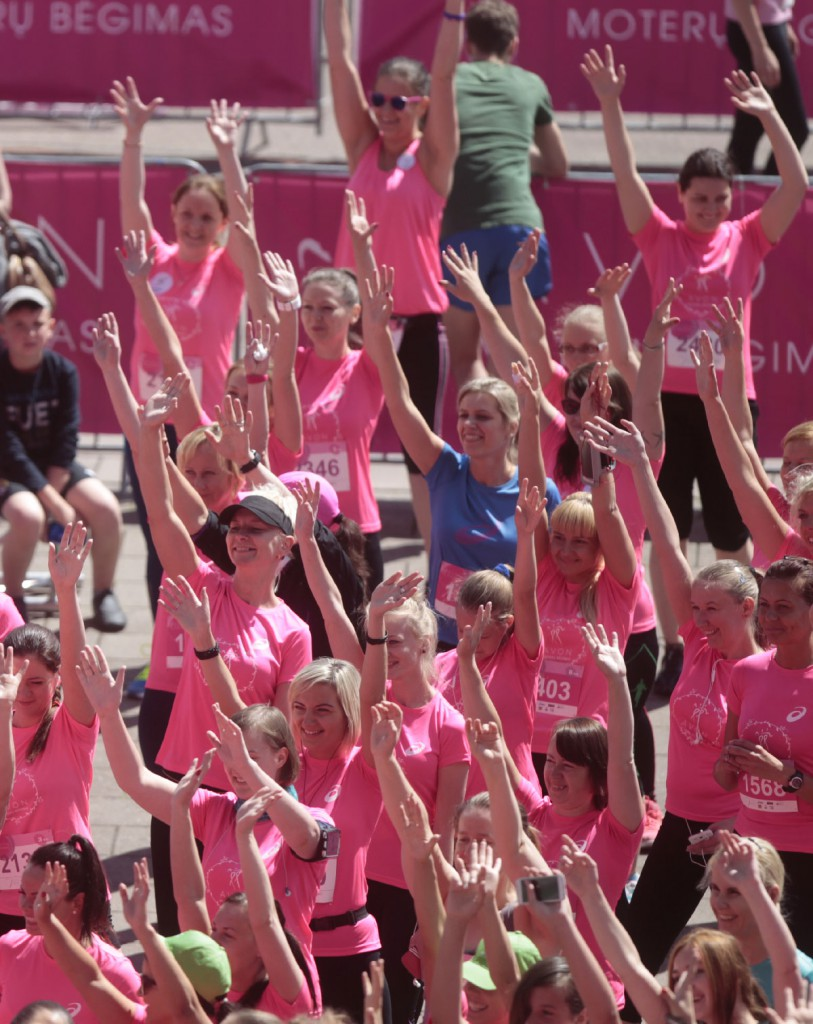
- Date: 2021 June 12th
- Location: Vilnius
- Event type: Road
- Distance: 5k, Kids run
- Established: 2013
- Website: Women run
- Participants: 501 (2020); 917 (2019)

The Vilnius Women Run is an annual road running event in Vilnius, Lithuania. It offers a 5K race and a running experience for children. It is usually held on a Saturday in June, and travels through some of the most beautiful places in Vilnius Old Town.

The event is organized Tarptautinis Maratonas, a public institution that organizes other endurance sports events including the Vilnius Marathon, Trakai Triathlon and Vilnius Christmas Run.

== History ==
The first women's run in Vilnius Vingis Park took place in 2013 June 16.

The main goals of the very first Women Run were to remind them of the importance of self-screening and prevention of breast cancer in every woman's life and to promote a healthy lifestyle.

In 2013 participants were able to compete in distances of 7 and 3.5 kilometers. 650 runners crossed the finish line. The winners of the first run were Lina Batulevičiūtė and Bronė Lenkevičiūtė. In 2014 the distances changed a bit - the participants chose between 6 and 3 kilometers courses. The winners this time were Rasa Drazdauskaitė and Austėja Miežytė.

In 2017 the two women's runs merged (AVON and Nike She Runs, hosted by Nike since 2013) into one. In this renewed run, the participants had to overcome a different (5k) length of track starting from Vilnius White Bridge. In 2020 the traditional run was scheduled to run on June 13, but it had to be moved to August 8. This decision was made due to the difficult situation in the country caused by COVID-19. As with almost all other similar sporting events, the number of people taking part has fallen this year - from 501 in the main 5 kilometer distance - almost twice as low as in 2019. In 2021 The women's run will be held for the 9th time.

== Prizininkai ==
Year	Event	Prizininkai					
Year	Event	Gold	Result	Silver	Result	Bronze	Result
2020	5k	(Lithuania) Gitana Akmanavičiūtė	0:18:34	(Lithuania) Inga Cimarmanaitė	0:19:09	(Lithuania) Rūta Šimkūnaitė	0:19:34
2019	5k	(Lithuania) Loreta Kančytė	0:17:23	(Lithuania) Evelina Miltenė	0:18:04	(Lithuania) Viktorija Varnagirytė	0:18:15
2018	5k	(Lithuania) Gitana Akmanavičiūtė	0:18:51	(Lithuania) Kristina Mickuvienė	0:19:32	(Lithuania) Eglė Sakalaitė	0:19:51
2017	5k	(Lithuania) Loreta Kančytė	0:18:36	(Lithuania) Gitana Akmanavičiūtė	0:19:03	(Lithuania) Agnė Krupinskaitė	0:19:21
2016	6k	(Lithuania) Evelina Miltenė	0:22:04	(Lithuania) Rūta Šimkūnaitė	0:24:59	(Lithuania) Renata Siliuk	0:26:03
2016	3k	(Lithuania) Agnė Krupinskaitė	0:11:58	(Lithuania) Neringa Norkutė	0:12:29	(Lithuania) Vaida Priedininkaitė	0:12:55
2015	6k	(Lithuania) Rasa Drazdauskaitė	0:22:46	(Lithuania) Inga Mastianica	0:22:59	(Lithuania) Loreta Bliujienė	0:23:13
2015	3k	(Lithuania) Evelina Uševaitė	0:10:39	(Lithuania) Migle Šaltenytė	0:11:10	(Lithuania) Brigita Virbalytė	0:11:14
2014	6k	(Lithuania) Rasa Drazdauskaitė	0:22:51	(Lithuania) Lina Batulevičiūtė	0:23:00	(Lithuania) Nadežda Roždestvenskaja	0:24:00
2014	3k	(Lithuania) Austėja Miežytė	0:11:00	(Lithuania) Jurgita Levertavičiūtė	0:11:25	(Lithuania) Ignė Grigaitytė	0:11:59
2013	7k	(Lithuania) Lina Batulevičiūtė	0:29:04	(Lithuania) Olga Ziuganova	0:29:27	(Lithuania) Loreta Bliujienė	0:29:59
2013	3.5k	(Lithuania) Bronė Lenkevičiūtė	0:13:42	(Lithuania) Jurgita Levertavičiūtė	0:13:46	(Lithuania) Simona Janavičiūtė	0:14:09
