= Vilnius Christmas run =

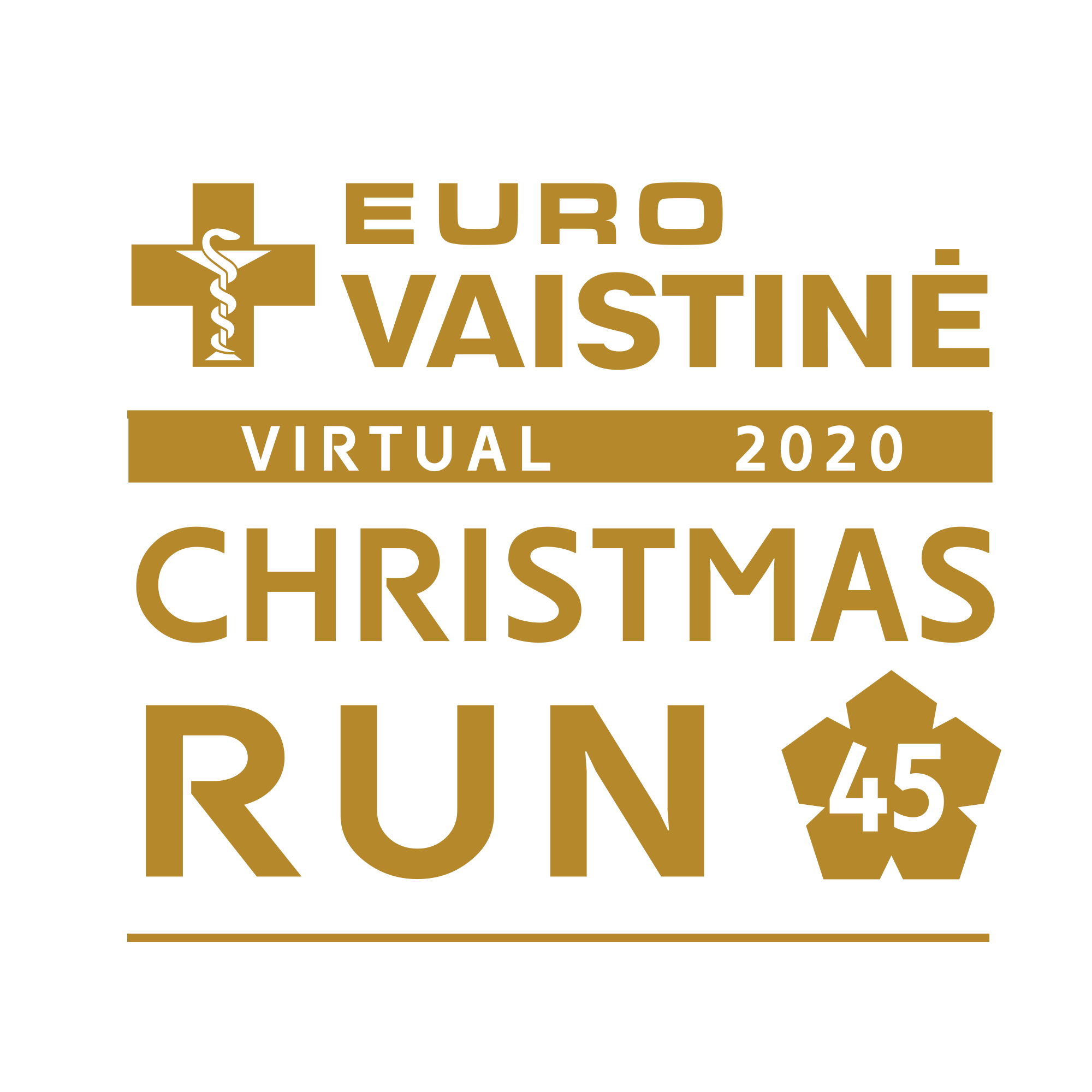
- Date: 2021 February 1 - 15th
- Location: Vilnius
- Event type: Road
- Distance: 12km, 6km, 3km, 300m Kids run
- Primary sponsor: Eurovaistinė
- Established: 1975
- Website: Vilnius Christmas run
- Participants: 3868 (2019); 3553 (2018); 3263 (2017)

Vilnius Christmas run is the oldest Christmas run in Lithuania with the biggest number of participants. Race has distances of 12km, 6km or 3km. Biggest part of the track is in Vilnius Old Town. Children has their own distance of 300 metres Kids run. The sporting event with deep traditions is also considered to be the most fun running event in the country. The participants are running dressed in Christmas-themed, movie heroes or well-known characters costumes.

The event is organized by the Public Institution "Tarptautinis Maratonas". This institution also organizes other endurance sports events - "Vilnius Marathon", "Trakai Triathlon", "Vilnius Women Run".

== History ==
The first race in 1975 was organized to celebrate the New Year in a group of 77 like-minded enthusiasts. Idea stemmed from the enthusiasm and desire of running-minded people to actively celebrate the New Year. For this reason firstly this event was known as the New Year's run, but after Lithuanian independence event often in calendar was closer to Christmas, so another name emerged Christmas run.

Pranas Baublys became the first winner of this run. Meanwhile, Bronė Šablevičiūtė overcame the 6.5k distance for women at the fastest pace.

Vytautas Stanevičius, a physical education teacher, can be considered the most important participant in the Christmas run. He has not missed a single race since 1975, and last year (2019) this veteran covered 6 kilometers again.

A particularly large number of runners took part in competitions between 1985 and 1988. As many as 2,000 running enthusiasts ran into the streets, which was extremely impressive figures at the time.

Oldest veteran Vlad Levickis was 87 years at the start. The youngest participant (excluding "Kids run" participants) can be considered three year old Tadas Gerulskis, who covered the 5k track next to his mother.

The main organizer and initiator of the competition until 2010 was Jonas Grigas. He was also known as a former famous athlete and director of Žalgiris Stadium. Therefore, the start and finish of the Christmas (earlier New Year's) run was given at the Žalgiris stadium. Later, the start and the track were moved to the streets of Vilnius Old Town.

Since 2011, the organization of this run has been transferred to the hands of the public institution "Tarptautinis maratonas", which also creates the largest running festival in Lithuania - Rimi Vilnius Marathon.

The main distance of the competition is a bit of non-standard length - 12 kilometers. This number symbolizes a year of 12 months. Respectively, participants who want shorter distances can choose half - 6 kilometers, or a quarter of the main distance - 3 kilometers. In recent years, even the smallest runners have found a suitable distance of 300 meters in "Kids Run".

Today this run count almost 4000 runners. Majority of them runs with Santa Claus, Snow White or any other costume.

At 2020 Christmas Run was supposed to start on December 20, Sunday, but because of the difficult pandemic situation and the restrictions for big events the format of the run was transformed to virtual. In virtual run running format participants run individually and the results (time and distance) are tracked with app or sports watch.

== Results ==
Year	Event	Prizewinners					
Year	Event	Gold	Result	Silver	Result	Bronze	Result
2019	Men's 12k	(Lithuania) Valdas Dopolskas	0:38:18	(Lithuania) Ignas Brasevičius	0:38:23	(Lithuania) Jaunius Strazdas	0:41:14
2019	Women's 12k	(Belarus) Anastasiya Dashkevich	0:43:46	(Lithuania) Monika Bytautiene	0:44:20	(Lithuania) Viktorija Varnagirytė	0:46:13
2019	Men's 6k	(Lithuania) Egidijus Adomkaitis	0:18:52	(Lithuania) Lukas Tarasevicius	0:18:59	(Lithuania) Mantas Martinkus	0:20:12
2019	Women's 6k	(Lithuania) Gitana Akmanavičiūtė	0:23:31	(Lithuania) Dovilė Nakvosaitė	0:23:46	(Lithuania) Elzbieta Guoda Adomaitytė	0:24:27
2019	Men's 3k	(Lithuania) Dalius Pavliukovičius	0:09:22	(Lithuania) Aivaras Čekanavičius	0:09:31	(Lithuania) Jevgenijus Galuška	0:09:35
2019	Women's 3k	(Lithuania) Vilija Gvildienė	0:12:06	(Lithuania) Virginija Višinskienė	0:12:14	(Lithuania) Daiva Bielevičiūtė	0:12:19
