= Ulrich Brugger =

German long-distance runner (born 1947)

Personal information
- Born: 1 April 1947 (age 79) Stuttgart, West Germany

Sport
- Sport: Track and field
Medal record
Representing West Germany
European Indoor Championships
Bronze medal – third place	1972 Grenoble	3000 m

Ulrich Brugger (born 1 April 1947) is a retired West German long-distance runner who specialized in the 5000 metres.

== Biography ==
He won the bronze medal in the 3000 metres at the 1972 European Indoor Championships.

In domestic competitions, he represented the sports club Stuttgarter Kickers. He won the silver medal at the 1970 West German championships and another silver medal at the 1972 West German indoor championships.
