= Trakai triathlon =

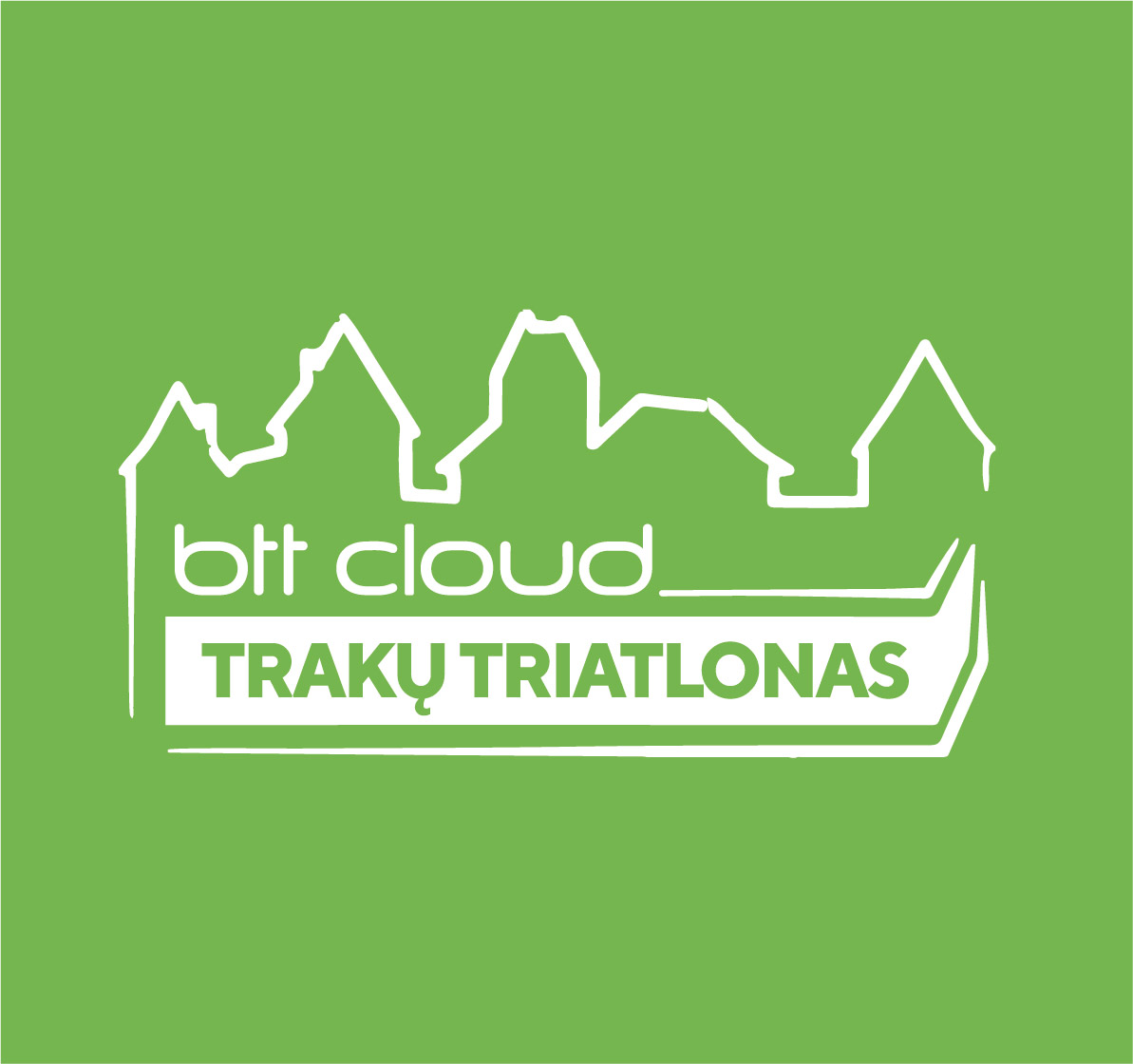
- Date: 2021 July 4th
- Location: Trakai
- Distance: Olympic distance, Sprint distance, Super sprint distance
- Primary sponsor: BTT Cloud
- Established: 2013
- Website: trakutriatlonas.lt/en/
- Participants: up to 400

“Trakai triathlon” is the biggest triathlon event in Lithuania taking place near Galvės lake, in Trakai.

Olympic (1.5 km swimming, 40 km cycling and 10 km running) and Sprint (0.75 km swimming, 20 km cycling and 5 km running) triathlon and latter distance relay competitions are organized. In addition to the classics there is shorter super sprint distance(0.4 km of swimming, 10 km of cycling and 2.5 km of running).

The Trakai triathlon is competed individually or by forming a team of 3 people, whose members take turns performing one of three competitions: swimming, cycling and running. After overcoming them all, the total result of all matches is added up.

The event is organized by the Public Institution "Tarptautinis Maratonas". This institution also organizes other endurance sports events - "Vilnius Marathon", "Vilnius Women run", "Vilnius Christmas Run".

== History ==
The very first Trakai triathlon was launched in 2013 with 117 participants. In 2016–2017, total number rose to 400.

Since 2018, the Lithuanian Triathlon Championship has been taking place in Trakai Triathlon.

In 2019, the Trakai Triathlon had addition with a shorter distance - super sprint (0.4 km of swimming, 10 km of cycling and 2.5 km of running).

This event will be held for the 9th time this summer in Trakai.

== Results ==
Year	Event	Prizininkai					
Year	Event	Gold	Result	Silver	Result	Bronze	Result
2020	Men olympic distance	(Lithuania) Lukas Prokopavičius	2:04:31	(Lithuania) Jaunius Strazdas	2:04:57	(Lithuania) Igor Kozlovskij	2:05:05
2020	Women olympic distance	(Lithuania) Inga Paplauskė	2:23:53	(Lithuania) Viktorija Kalvelytė	2:32:53	(Lithuania) Ieva Urbonavičiūtė	2:33:04
2020	Men sprint distance	(Lithuania) Jokūbas Tijūnonis	1:04:40	(Lithuania) Robertas Gegužis	1:05:49	(Lithuania) Džiugas Karklelis	1:06:06
2020	Women sprint distance	(Lithuania) Ugnė Paurytė	1:13:55	(Lithuania) Rugilė Girštautaitė	1:15:08	(Lithuania) Emilė Steponėnaitė	1:17:42
2020	Men super sprint distance	(Lithuania) Zigmas Reisas	0:35:03	(Lithuania) Kajus Marozas	0:35:53	(Lithuania) Jonas Gabalis	0:37:27
2020	Women super sprint distance	(Lithuania) Jomilė Pribušauskaitė	0:40:55	(Lithuania) Orinta Mauraitė	0:43:27	(Lithuania) Milda Ažusienytė	0:44:55
2019	Men olympic distance	(Lithuania) Lukas Prokopavičius	2:01:27	(Spain) Alberto Casillas	2:02:47	(Lithuania) Marijus Butrimavičius	2:04:58
2019	Women olympic distance	(Lithuania) Inga Paplauskė	2:29:20	(Belarus) Natalija Barkun	2:32:29	(Lithuania) Unė Narkūnaitė	2:35:18
2019	Men sprint distance	(Latvia) Artjoms Gajevskis	1:01:15	(Lithuania) Mykolas Banys	1:05:29	(Lithuania) Kasparas Apkievičius	1:05:44
2019	Women sprint distance	(Lithuania) Rugilė Girštautaitė	1:14:30	(Lithuania) Beatričė Vinciūnaitė	1:15:26	(Lithuania) Sigita Šidlauskienė	1:20:03
2019	Men super sprint distance	(Lithuania) Robertas Gegužis	0:35:20	(Lithuania) Zigmas Reisas	0:36:31	(Lithuania) Augustas Ganelinas	0:38:10
2019	Women super sprint distance	(Lithuania) Ugnė Paurytė	0:37:47	(Lithuania) Emilė Steponėnaitė	0:40:09	(Lithuania) Brigita Šniukštaitė	0:40:12
2018	Men olympic distance	(Lithuania) Tautvydas Kopūstas	2:00:09	(Spain) Ricardo Alcalde Perez	2:01:05	(Lithuania) Jaunius Strazdas	2:02:31
2018	Women olympic distance	(Lithuania) Inga Aukselytė	2:19:47	(Belarus) Valiantsina Zeliankevich	2:23:29	(Lithuania) Asta Zaborskytė	2:32:31
2018	Men sprint distance	(Lithuania) Andrius Dapkevičius	1:05:59	(Lithuania) Andrej Gerasimov	1:06:53	(Lithuania) Aleksandras Kazanskij	1:07:19
2018	Women sprint distance	(Lithuania) Antonina Faustova	1:17:09	(Lithuania) Lina Nikitinaitė	1:24:36	(Lithuania) Liudmila Iniakina	1:29:43
