= 1972 European Athletics Indoor Championships – Men's 3000 metres =

The men's 3000 metres event at the 1972 European Athletics Indoor Championships was held on 12 March in Grenoble.

== Results ==
Rank	Name	Nationality	Time	Notes
1st place, gold medalist(s)	Juris Grustiņš	Soviet Union	8:02.85	
2nd place, silver medalist(s)	Yuriy Aleksashin	Soviet Union	8:03.20	
3rd place, bronze medalist(s)	Ulrich Brugger	West Germany	8:05.07	
4	André Ornelis	Belgium	8:11.43	
5	Per Halle	Norway	8:15.49	
6	Renzo Finelli	Italy	8:18.74	
7	Michel Géraudie	France	8:24.48	
