= Laura Igaune =

Latvian athletics competitor

Laura Igaune (10 February 1988) is a Latvian athlete who specializes in the discus throw and hammer throw. Igaune achieved her best result in hammer throw of 71.61 m on April 19, 2019, in Durham, NC United States, which is the Latvian national record. Her personal record in discus throw is 51.17 m.

Igaune was an All-American thrower for the Western Kentucky Lady Toppers track and field team, finishing 7th in the hammer throw at the 2011 NCAA Division I Outdoor Track and Field Championships.

Igaune qualified for the Olympics while working as an assistant coach for the Elon Phoenix track and field team.
