= Aleksandrs Prokopčuks =

Latvian long-distance runner

Personal information
- Born: 2 May 1967 (age 59) Riga, Latvian SSR, Soviet Union

Sport
- Country: Latvia
- Sport: Track and field
- Event: Marathon

Aleksandrs Prokopčuks (born 2 May 1967) is a Latvian long-distance runner. He competed in the men's marathon at the 1996 Summer Olympics, finishing in 51st place in 2:21:50. He won the Riga Marathon in 1993 and 1996 and the Baden-Karlsruhe Marathon in Germany where he set his marathon P.R of 2.15:56 in 1995.
