= Edgars Eriņš =

Latvian decathlete and bobsledder

Personal information
- Nationality: Latvian
- Born: 18 June 1986 (age 40) Varakļāni, Latvian SSR, Soviet Union
- Height: 1.91 m (6 ft 3 in)
- Weight: 86 kg (190 lb)

Sport
- Country: Latvia
- Sport: Track and field
- Event: Decathlon

Achievements and titles
- Personal best: Decathlon: 8312 points

Edgars Eriņš (born 18 June 1986) is a Latvian decathlete and bobsledder.

He is the holder of the Latvian record in decathlon, which is 8312 points. Eriņš reached it in the 2011 Latvian Championships, which he won. He was qualified for 2011 World Championships in Daegu, South Korea and appeared on the entry list, but didn't compete due to injury.

He made his bobsleigh Europa Cup debut in November 2013 in a four-man race at Altenberg where his crew finished sixth. He made his first appearance in the Bobsleigh World Cup in the four-man event at St. Moritz in January 2014, where his sleigh scored an 18th place.
