= Latvia at the 2010 European Athletics Championships =

Latvia was represented by 21 athletes at the 2010 European Athletics Championships in Barcelona, Spain, including also the defending European champion in 110 metres hurdles Staņislavs Olijars.

Due to lack of funds, the Latvian Athletics Union was unable to fund Latvian delegation's participation in the event. Initially, also Dmitrijs Miļkevičs and Edgars Eriņš were among the competitors, but they decided not to participate, once they acknowledged the situation.

== Results ==
At the 2010 European Athletics Championships Latvia won a total of 2 medals: 1 bronze and 1 gold.

=== Medal table ===
2010 Barcelona	Gold	Silver	Bronze	Total
Latvia (LAT)	1	0	1	2

=== Medalists ===
Medal	Name	Event	Date
Gold	Ineta Radēviča	Women's long jump	28 July
Bronze	Māris Urtāns	Men's shot put	31 July

=== Men ===
Track and road events

Event	Athletes	Heats		Semifinal		Final	
Event	Athletes	Result	Rank	Result	Rank	Result	Rank
100 m	Ronalds Arājs	10.52	21st Q	10.47	15th	DNQ	
800 m	Dmitrijs Jurkevičs	DNS					
1500 m	Dmitrijs Jurkevičs	3:45.21	24th			DNQ	
110 m hurdles	Staņislavs Olijars	DSQ	–	DNQ			
20 km walk	Arnis Rumbenieks					1:30:50 (SB)	23rd

Field events

Event	Athletes	Qualification		Final	
Event	Athletes	Result	Rank	Result	Rank
Long jump	Jānis Leitis	6.30 - 7.87 - X	20th	DNQ	
High jump	Normunds Pūpols	2.19	18th	DNQ	
Shot put	Māris Urtāns	18.55 - 19.17 - 20.19	6th Q	19.81 - 20.12 - X - 20.56 - 20.72 - 20.64	3rd place, bronze medalist(s)
Hammer throw	Igors Sokolovs	71.24 - 73.29 - 70.69	14th	DNQ	
Hammer throw	Ainārs Vaičulēns	65.43 - X - X	25th	DNQ	
Javelin throw	Vadims Vasiļevskis	X - X - 67.56	23rd	DNQ	
Javelin throw	Ēriks Rags	X - X - 78.45	7th q	X - 76.93 - 76.08	11th
Javelin throw	Ainārs Kovals	78.58 - 78.22 - 79.32	4th q	81.19 - X - X - X - 75.19 - 80.55	6th
Decathlon	Atis Vaisjūns			7524	19th

=== Women ===
Track and road events

Event	Athletes	Heats		Semifinal		Final	
Event	Athletes	Result	Rank	Result	Rank	Result	Rank
400 m hurdles	Ieva Zunda	56.02 (SB)	13th Q	56.37 (SB)	12th	DNQ	
4x100 m relay	Marlēna Reimane; Ieva Zunda; Sandra Krūma; Jekaterina Čekele	44.92	16th			DNQ	

Field events

Event	Athletes	Qualification		Final	
Event	Athletes	Result	Rank	Result	Rank
Long jump	Ineta Radēviča	6.72 - -	4th Q	6.73 - 6.87 - 6.79 - 6.92 - X - X (NR)	1st
Long jump	Lauma Grīva	6.23 - 6.41 - 6.60 (PB)	15th	DNQ	
Triple jump	Ineta Radēviča	DNS			
Javelin throw	Madara Palameika	58.85	6th q	55.22 - 53.44 - 59.70 - 57.76 - 60.78 - X	8th
Javelin throw	Sinta Ozoliņa-Kovala	56.11	13th	DNQ	
