= Andualem Belay Shiferaw =

Ethiopian long-distance runner

Personal information
- Nationality: Ethiopian
- Born: Andualem Belay Shiferaw; 5 April 1992 (age 34) Ethiopia
- Occupation: long-distance runner
- Years active: 2012–present

Sport
- Country: Ethiopia
- Sport: Athletics
- Event(s): Marathon, Half marathon, 10K road

Achievements and titles
- Personal bests: Marathon: 2:04:44 (2023); Half marathon: 1:00:10 (2012); 10 km road: 28:20 (2015)

Andualem Belay Shiferaw (born 5 April 1992) is an Ethiopian long-distance runner specializing in marathon and half marathon events. He has achieved multiple victories in international road races.

== Career ==
Andualem Belay Shiferaw has been a consistent competitor in road running since 2012. His personal best in the half marathon is 1:00:10, set in Lille, France, in September 2012. He also holds a personal best of 28:20 for the 10-kilometer road race from March 2015.

Shiferaw's marathon personal best is 2:04:44, which he set at the Berlin Marathon on September 24, 2023, finishing in sixth place.

He won the Lisbon Marathon multiple times (2019, 2021, 2022). In 2022, he broke his own course record at the EDP Lisbon Marathon, finishing in 2:05:45. He also won the Ottawa Marathon in 2022.

Other notable marathon results include:

- Winning the Riga Marathon in 2019 with a time of 2:08:51.
- Winning the Castellón Marathon in 2019 (2:08:16) and previously in 2013 (2:11:59).
- A second-place finish at the Riyadh Marathon in 2022.
- A third-place finish at the Lanzhou Marathon in May 2024.
- Finishing 15th at the Boston Marathon in 2023.
- A performance of 2:09:35 at the ORLEN Prague Marathon in May 2025, where he finished fourth.

== Achievements ==
Year	Race	City	Position	Time
2019	Lisbon Marathon	Lisbon	1st	2:05:59
2019	Riga Marathon	Riga	1st	2:08:51
2021	Lisbon Marathon	Lisbon	1st	2:05:52
2022	Riyadh Marathon	Riyadh	2nd	2:06:28
2022	Ottawa Marathon	Ottawa	1st	2:06:24
2022	Lisbon Marathon	Lisbon	1st	2:05:45
2023	Berlin Marathon	Berlin	6th	2:04:44 (PB)
2024	Lanzhou Marathon	Lanzhou	3rd	2:09:47
2025	ORLEN Prague Marathon	Prague	4th	2:09:35
