= Latvia at the 2006 European Athletics Championships =

Latvia, at the 2006 European Athletics Championships held in Sweden. It won 1 gold medal. In this European Championship will start 16 athletes who will represent Latvia.

== Results ==
2006 Gothenburg	Gold	Silver	Bronze	Total
Latvia (LAT)	1	0	0	1

Place	Athlete	Event	Results
1	Staņislavs Olijars	110 m hurdles	13.24
4	Dmitrijs Miļkevičs	800 m	1:46.70
4	Vadims Vasiļevskis	Javelin	83.21
5	Ainārs Kovals	Javelin	81.65
6	Jeļena Prokopčuka	10000 m	30:38.78 (NR)
9	Ēriks Rags	Javelin	79.51
9	Jolanta Dukure	20 km walk	1:31.02 (NR)
13	Ingus Janevics	50 km walk	3:56.32 (PB)
13	Inga Kožarenoka	Javelin	58.25
14	Jesenija Volžankina	Heptathlon	5979
15/16	Normunds Pūpols	High jump	2.23
16	Artūrs Āboliņš	Long jump	7.77
18	Uģis Brūvelis	50 km walk	4:02.03
20	Ilze Gribule	Javelin	54.48
22	Jesenija Volžankina	Long jump	6.22
26	Māris Urtāns	Shot put	18.40
DNS	Ineta Radēviča	Long jump	-

== Competitors ==
=== Men ===
800 m: Dmitrijs Miļkevičs
110 m Hurdles: Staņislavs Olijars
50 km Walk: Ingus Janevics, Uģis Brūvelis
High jump: Normunds Pūpols
Long jump: Artūrs Āboliņš
Shot put: Māris Urtāns
Javelin: Vadims Vasiļevskis, Ēriks Rags, Ainārs Kovals

=== Women ===
10,000 m: Jeļena Prokopčuka
20 km Walk: Jolanta Dukure
Long jump: Ineta Radēviča, Jesenija Volžankina
Javelin: Inga Kožarenoka, Linda Gribule
Heptathlon: Jesenija Volžankina
