= Dmitrijs Miļkevičs =

Latvian athlete

Personal information
- Born: 6 December 1981 (age 44) Riga, Latvian SSR, Soviet Union
- Height: 182 cm (6 ft 0 in)
- Weight: 72 kg (159 lb)

Sport
- Sport: Track running
- Events: 400 metres * 800 metres

Dmitrijs Miļkevičs (born 6 December 1981) is a former Latvian track athlete who competed in 400 metres and 800 metres.

== Biography ==
Miļkevičs ran a career-best 46.44 in the 400 metres at the 2003 European Athletics U23 Championships in Bydgoszcz, Poland. He has won an NCAA championship while competing for the University of Nebraska–Lincoln. In the 2004 Summer Olympics, he was 14th in the 800 metres. In 2006, he set the Latvian record in the 800 metres with a time of 1:43.67, a record which still stands.

After Miļkevičs found out that, due to lack of funds, the Latvian Athletics Union wouldn't able to pay for Latvian delegation's start at the 2010 European Athletics Championships, he decided not to compete.

== Personal bests ==
- 400 m
  - Indoor - 47.61 (2002)
  - Outdoor - 46.44 (2003)
- 600 y
  - Indoor - 1:08.67 (2004)
- 600 m
  - Indoor - 1:15.60 (2005)
- 800 m
  - Indoor - 1:45.72 (2008)
  - Outdoor - 1:43.67 (2006)
- 1000 m
  - Indoor - 2:22.82 (2005)

== Achievements ==
- 2002
  - European Indoor Championships - Vienna, Austria
    - 400 m, 19th, (47.61 seconds), PB
  - European Championships in Athletics - Munich, Germany
    - 400 m, 23rd, (46.87 seconds)
- 2003
  - European Athletics U23 Championships - Bydgoszcz, Poland
    - 400 m, (46.44 seconds) PB
- 2004
  - Big 12 Conference Indoor championships - United States
    - 800 m, 1st, (1:48.82)
  - NCAA Indoor Championships - United States
    - 800 m, 6th, (1:48.97)
  - Big 12 Conference Outdoor Championships - United States
    - 800 m, 2nd, (1:48.07)
  - NCAA Outdoor Championships - United States
    - 800 m, 6th, (1:47.51)
  - Summer Olympic Games - Athens, Greece
    - 800 m, 14th, (1:46.62)
- 2005
  - European Indoor Championships - Madrid, Spain
    - 800 m, 14th, (1:51.61)
  - Big 12 Conference Outdoor Championships - United States
    - 800 m, 2nd, (1:45.10)
  - NCAA Outdoor Championships - United States
    - 800 m, 1st, (1:44.74) PB
  - World Championships in Athletics - Helsinki, Finland
    - 800 m, 42nd, (1:50.44)
- 2006
  - World Indoor Championships - Moscow, Russia
    - 800 m 4th, (1:48.01)
  - European Athletics Championships - Gothenburg, Sweden
    - 800 m, 4th, (1:46.70)
