= Ilona Marhele =

Latvian long-distance runner

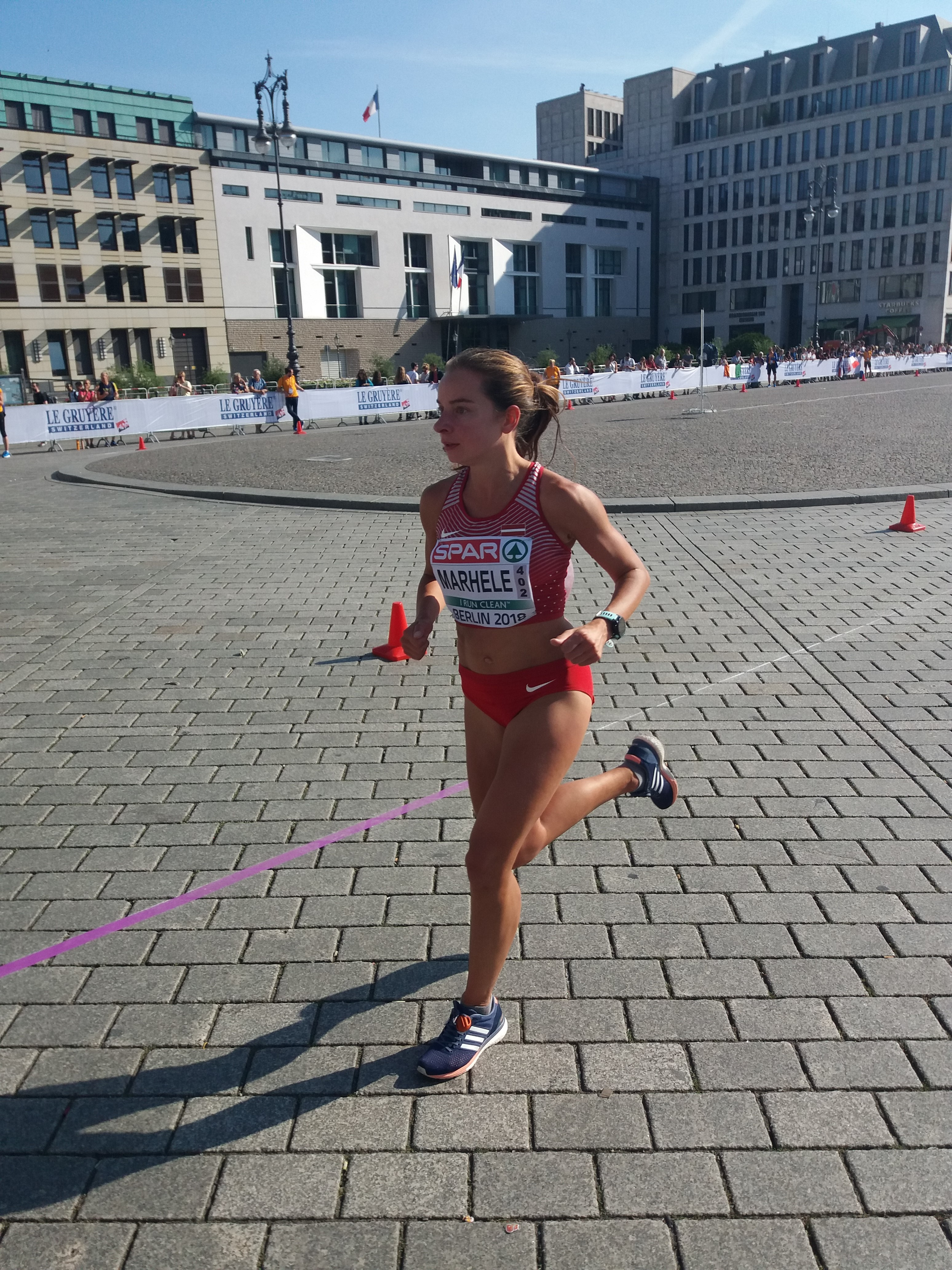
- Ilona Marhele running the marathon at the 2018 European Athletics Championships

Personal information
- Born: 5 April 1986 (age 40) Alūksne, Latvian SSR, Soviet Union

Sport
- Sport: Track and field
- Event: Marathon

Ilona Marhele (born 5 April 1986) is a Latvian long-distance runner who specialises in the marathon. She competed in the women's marathon event at the 2016 Summer Olympics in Brazil, finishing in 61st place with a time of 2:41:02. Her P.R. for the event is 2.37:29, a time she accomplished in the year 2019.
