= Latvia at the 2012 European Athletics Championships =

Latvia is represented by 22 athletes at the 2012 European Athletics Championships held in Helsinki, Finland.

== Participants ==
Event	Men	Women
100 m	Ronalds Arājs	
800 m	Dmitrijs Jurkevičs	
1500 m	Dmitrijs Jurkevičs	
3000 m steeplechase		Poļina Jeļizarova
Pole Vault	Pauls Pujāts	
Long Jump	Jānis Leitis	Ineta Radēviča; Lauma Grīva; Māra Grīva
Shot Put	Māris Urtāns	
Discus Throw	Oskars Vaisjūns	
Hammer Throw	Igors Sokolovs	
Javelin	Vadims Vasiļevskis; Zigismunds Sirmais; Ainārs Kovals	Madara Palameika; Sinta Ozoliņa-Kovala; Līna Mūze
Heptathlon		Aiga Grabuste; Laura Ikauniece
4 x 100 m relay	Jānis Leitis; Sandis Sabajevs; Ņikita Paņkins; Jānis Mezītis	

== Broadcasting ==
- LTV
