= Dmitrijs Serjogins =

Latvian long-distance runner

Personal information
- Born: 23 February 1993 (age 33)

Sport
- Country: Latvia
- Sport: Long-distance running

Dmitrijs Serjogins (born 23 February 1993) is a Latvian long-distance runner who specializes in endurance events such as the marathon. He has represented Latvia in international athletics competitions, showcasing his abilities on the global stage.

One of the most notable moments in his career came in 2019, when he competed in the men’s marathon at the World Athletics Championships in Doha, Qatar. This event featured some of the world’s top long-distance runners and was held under particularly challenging conditions, including extreme heat and humidity, which tested the endurance and resilience of all participants.

Serjogins completed the race and finished in 48th place, demonstrating determination and perseverance in a highly competitive field. Simply finishing a World Championship marathon is considered an achievement due to the level of competition and the physical demands of the race.

As a long-distance athlete, Serjogins has contributed to Latvia’s presence in international athletics, representing his country with dedication and consistency. His participation in events of this scale reflects both his personal commitment to the sport and his role in promoting long-distance running within Latvia.

== Career ==
In 2018, he competed in the men's half marathon at the 2018 IAAF World Half Marathon Championships held in Valencia, Spain. He finished in 101st place.

In 2019, he competed in the men's event at the 2019 European 10,000m Cup held in London, United Kingdom.

== Competition record ==
Year	Competition	Venue	Position	Event	Notes
Representing Latvia
2019	World Championships	Doha, Qatar	48th	Marathon	2:24:00
