= Latvian Athletics Association =

Latvian athletics governing body

- Latvijas Vieglatlētikas savienība
- Sport: Athletics
- Abbreviation: LVS
- Founded: 1921
- Affiliation: World Athletics
- Regional affiliation: EAA
- Headquarters: Riga
- President: Dmitrijs Miļkevičs
- Secretary: Lauris Madžuls

Official website
- athletics.lv
- (Latvia)

The Latvian Athletic Association (Latvian: Latvijas Vieglatlētikas savienība) is the governing body for the sport of athletics in Latvia.

== Affiliations ==
- World Athletics
- European Athletic Association (EAA)
- Latvian Olympic Committee

== National records ==
LVS maintains the Latvian records in athletics.
