= List of Men's Track & Field/Cross Country Academic All-America Team Members of the Year =

Student athlete award

Men's Track & Field/Cross Country Academic All-America Team Members of the Year
- Awarded for: The yearly outstanding track & field/cross country Academic All-America team member
- Country: United States & Canada
- Presented by: College Sports Communicators

History
- First award: 2002
- Most recent: Tito Alofe, Harvard University, Owen Fraser, Missouri University of Science and Technology, Aryan Shrivastava, University of Chicago, Luca Madeo, University of the Cumberlands
- Next ceremony: July 2027

The Men's Track & Field/Cross Country Academic All-America Team Member of the Year is the annual most outstanding singular athletics competitor of the set of male athletes selected for the Academic All-America Teams in a given year.

== Tables of winners ==
Overall Team Members of the Year

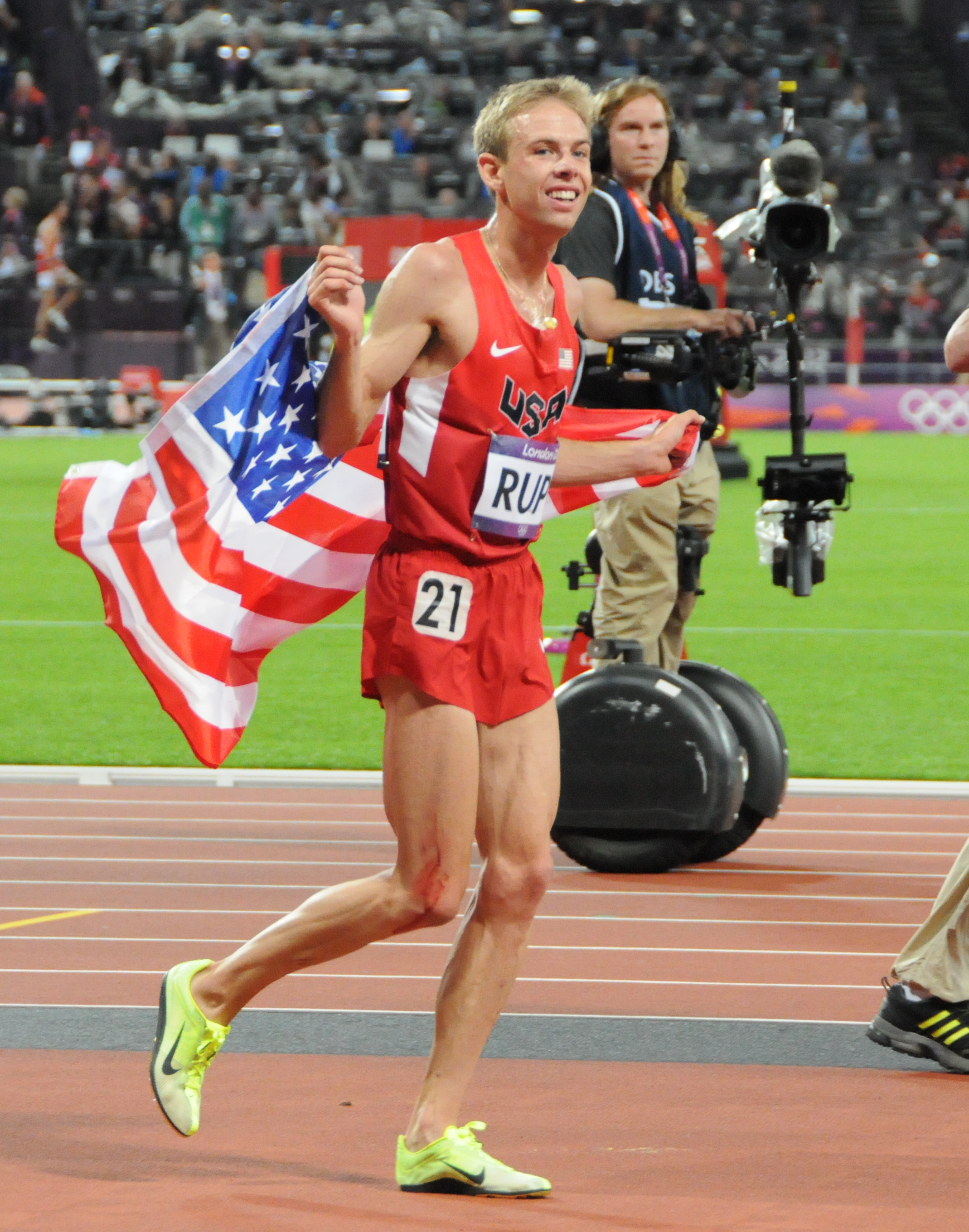
Galen Rupp in 2012
2009 overall winner

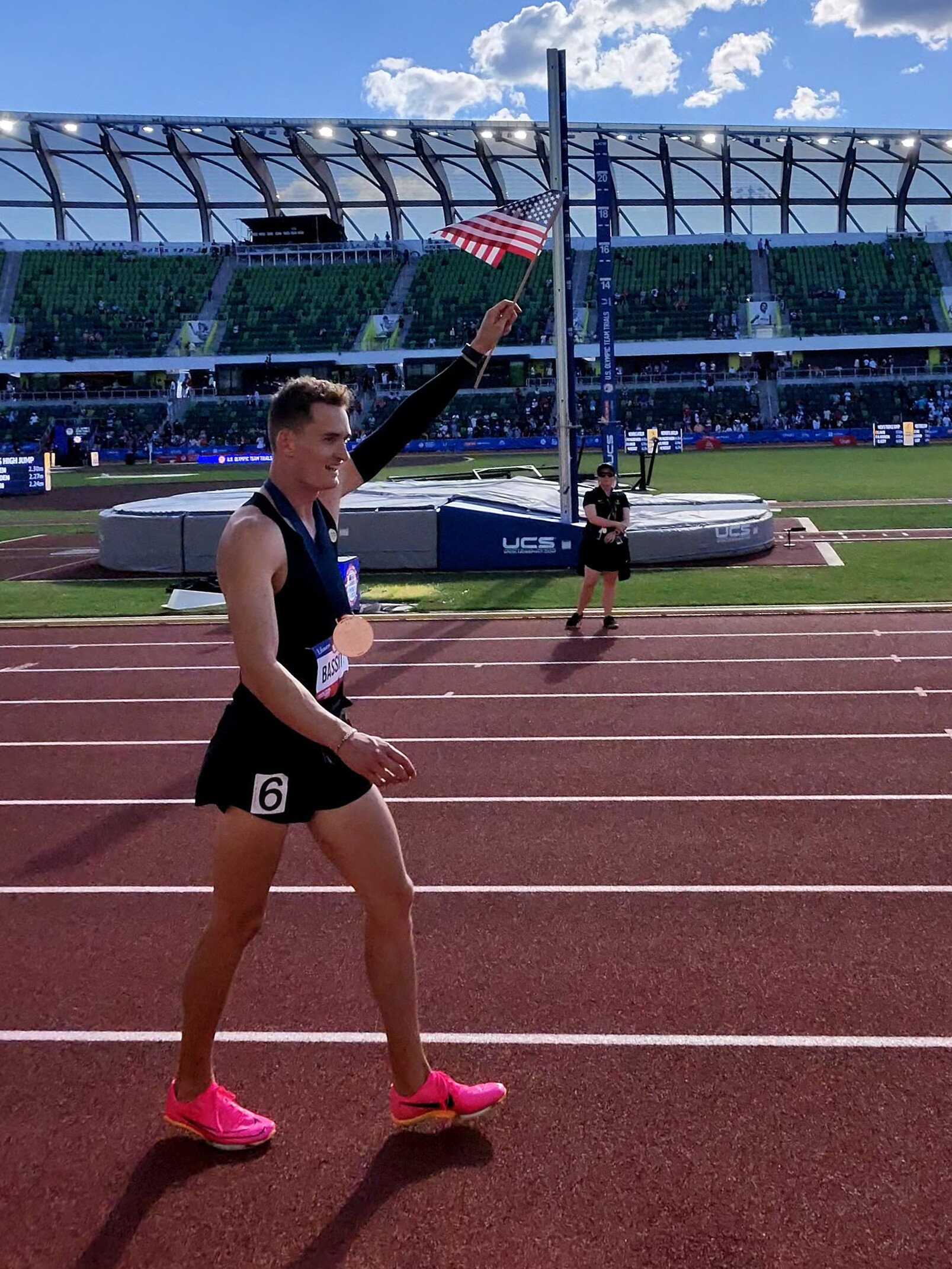
Trevor Bassitt in 2024
2021 winner and 2022 overall winner

Other Winners

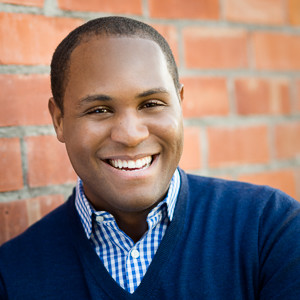
Garrett Johnson (pictured in 2016), 2006 winner

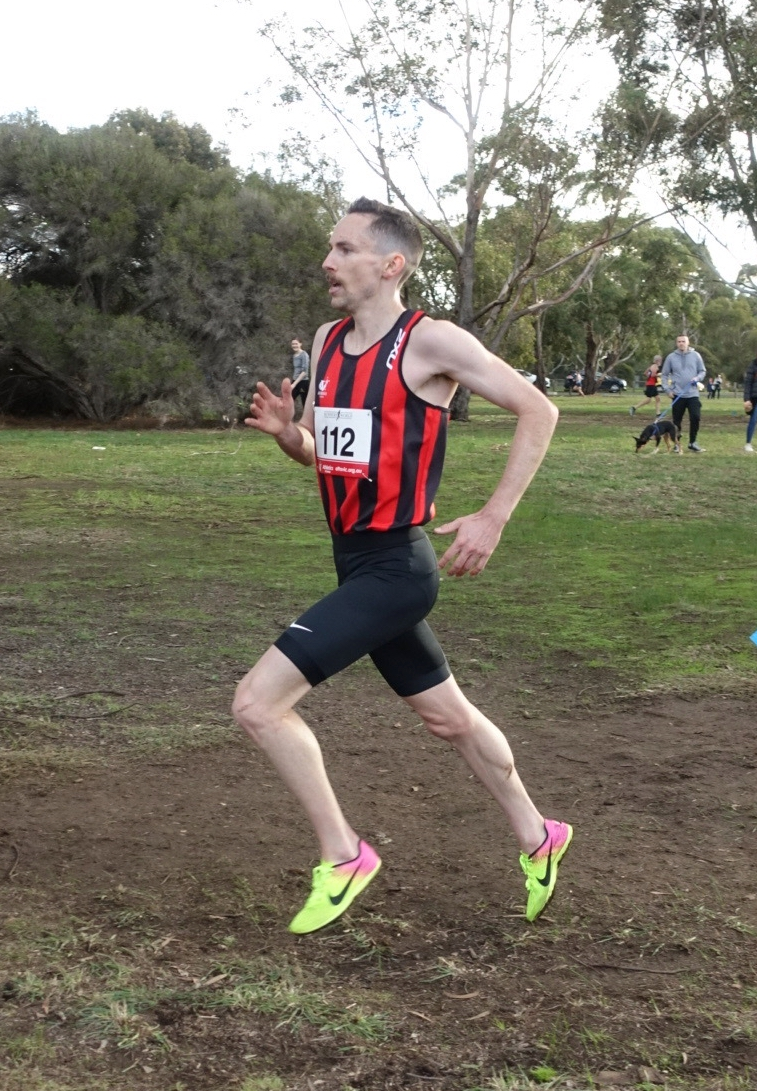
David McNeill (pictured in 2019), 2010 winner

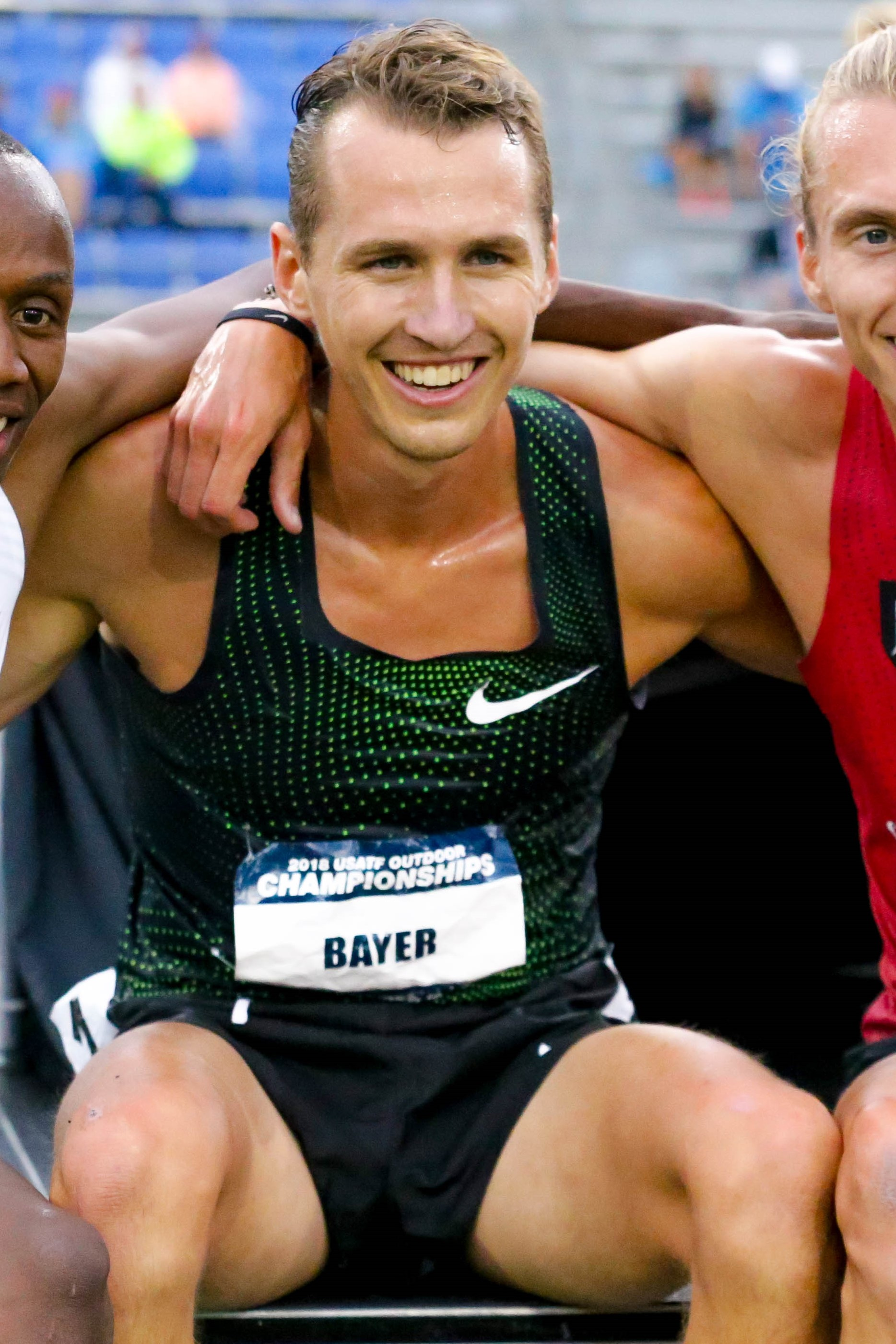
Andrew Bayer (pictured in 2018), 2013 winner

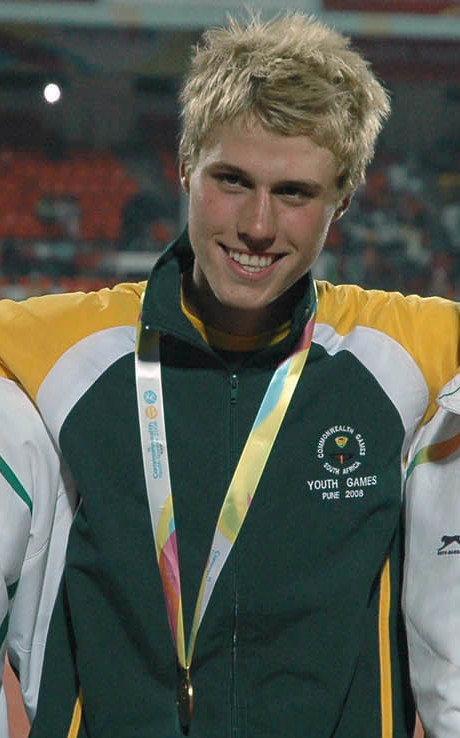
Stefan Brits (pictured in 2008), 2016 winner

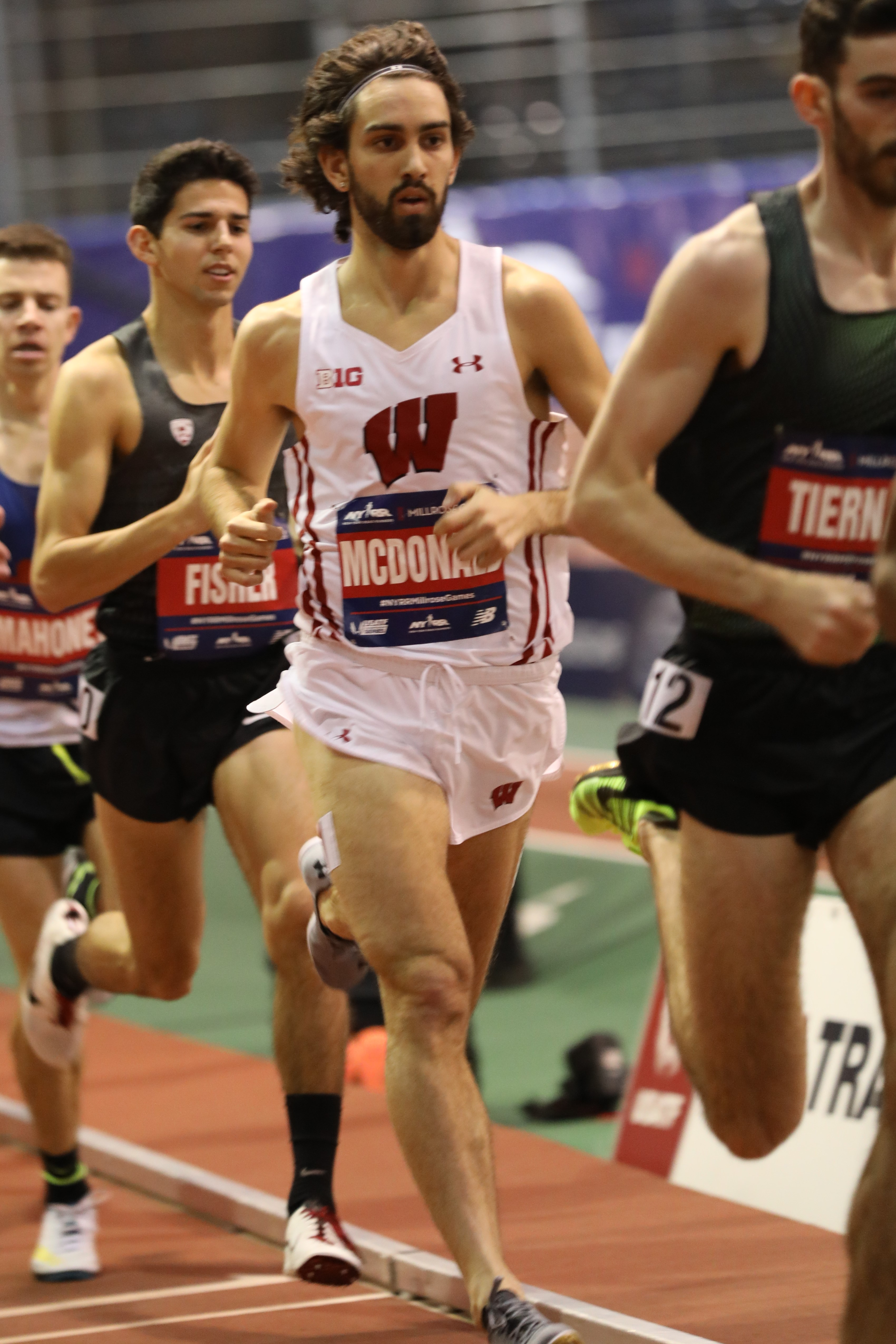
Morgan McDonald (pictured in 2019), 2019 winner

Key
†	Indicates winners of the all-sports Academic All-America award.

All winners are American unless indicated otherwise.

=== Two-division era (2002–2011) ===
Men's Track & Field/Cross Country Academic All-America Team Members of the Year (2002–2011)
Year	University Division		College Division	
Year	Winner	School	Winner	School
2002	Teren Jamison	Utah	Joel Klooster	Calvin
2003	Eric Dudley	Washington State	Andrew Hilliard	St. Thomas (FL)
2004	Adam Davis	Rice	Adam Copeland	Sewanee
2005	Mark Steckler	North Dakota State	Ryan Koch	St. Cloud State
2006	Garrett Johnson	Florida State	Uzoma Orji	MIT
2007	Nathan Brown	Wisconsin	Fritz Nugent	Redlands
2008	Donovan Kilmartin	Texas	Fritz Nugent	Redlands
2009	Galen Rupp†	Oregon	Aaron Braun	Adams State
2010	(Australia) David McNeill	Northern Arizona	Mark Husted	Colorado Mines
2011	Miles Batty	BYU	Bobby Torphy	Muhlenberg

=== Four-division era (2012–present) ===
Men's Track & Field/Cross Country Academic All-America Team Members of the Year (2012–present)
Year	Division I		Division II		Division III		College/NAIA (Note: College Division, 2011–19; NAIA, 2018–present)	
Year	Winner	School	Winner	School	Winner	School	Winner	School
2012	Miles Batty	BYU	Shawn Boss	Central Missouri	Tim Nelson	Wisconsin–Stout	Monte Larsen	Morningside
2013	Andrew Bayer	Indiana	Brent Vogel	Central Missouri	Tim Nelson	Wisconsin–Stout	Monte Larsen	Morningside
2014	(England) Luke Caldwell	New Mexico	William Shell	Southwest Baptist	Michael LeDuc	Connecticut College	Andy Reidsma	Trinity
2015	John Welk	Nebraska	Aaron Dinzeo	California (PA)	Daniel Bonthius	Wartburg	Hans Roelle	Eastern Oregon
2016	(South Africa) Stefan Brits	Florida State	Alex Hampel	Indiana (PA)	Mitchell Black	Tufts	Dixon Cooney	McPherson
2017	Drew Wiseman	Nebraska	Alejandro Garcia	Chadron State	Arinze Okeke	MIT	Matt Hall	Taylor (IN)
2018	Trey Culver	Texas Tech	Dustin Nading	Western Colorado	Tobias Muellers	Williams	Jason Kenny	Morningside
2019	(Australia) Morgan McDonald	Wisconsin	Derrick Williams	CSU Pueblo	Will Daniels	Central (IA)	Josiah McAllister	Concordia (NE)
2020	Tyler Day	Northern Arizona	Levi Wyrick	Pittsburg State	Nick Matteucci	Washington (MO)	Alex Martin	Idaho
2021	Turner Washington	Arizona State	Trevor Bassitt	Ashland	Yorai Shaoul	MIT	Dylan Kucera	Midland
2022	Turner Washington	Arizona State	Trevor Bassitt†	Ashland	Steven Hermsen	Carroll	Jordan Crawford	Missouri Baptist
2023	Turner Washington	Arizona State	Nathan Swadley	Missouri S&T	Matthew Kearney	MIT	Zach Bennetts	Concordia (NE)
2024	Dylan Targgart	South Carolina	Hunter Potrykus	Colorado Mines	James Settles	Colorado College	Carson Johnson	Cumberlands
2025	Simen Guttormsen	Duke	Loic Scomparin	Colorado Mines	Basheer Alramahi	John Carroll	Luca Madeo	Cumberlands
2026	Tito Alofe	Harvard	Owen Fraser†	Missouri S&T	Aryan Shrivastava	Chicago	Luca Madeo	Cumberlands
