= Luis Rivera (long jumper) =

Mexican long jumper (born 1987)

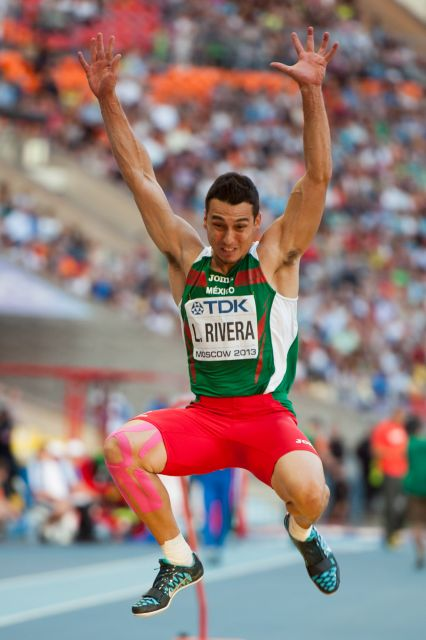
- Rivera at the 2013 World Championships

Personal information
- Born: June 21, 1987 (age 39) Agua Prieta, Sonora, Mexico
- Height: 1.83 m (6 ft 0 in)
- Weight: 79 kg (174 lb)

Sport
- Country: Mexico
- Sport: Athletics
- Event: Long jump
Medal record
World Championships
Bronze medal – third place	2013 Moscow	Long jump
Summer Universiade
Gold medal – first place	2013 Kazan	Long jump

Luis Alberto Rivera Morales (born 21 June 1987 in Agua Prieta) is a Mexican long jumper. He won a bronze medal at the 2013 World Championships and a gold medal at the 2013 Summer Universiade. He also competed at the 2012 Summer Olympics. His personal best is 8.46 metres, achieved in July 2013.

His brother, Edgar Rivera, competes in the high jump.

== Early life ==
A native of Agua Prieta, Sonora, Rivera was oldest of four children born to Luis Rivera Pompa and Alejandra Morales. His father had excelled in athletics while his maternal grandfather, León Morales Amézquita, was a marathon runner and played professional football for Unión de Curtidores.

Rivera played football before he began practicing the long jump at the age of 17.

He attended Central Arizona College, where he learned English. He won the junior college national championship in both the triple jump and the long jump. After finishing his General Studies degree, he transferred to the University of Arizona, where he was named all-American in long jump. He also won the indoor and outdoor conference titles in both the long jump and triple jump.

== Career ==
In 2013, Rivera competed at the Summer Universiade held in Kazan, Russia, where he jumped 8.46 meters to take the gold medal in a head-to-head battle with Russian national favorite Aleksandr Menkov, who finished 4 cm behind. Rivera's winning jump became the Mexican national record, and the University Games record.

Just over a month later, at the World Championships in Moscow, Russia, Menkov was again in the competition. This time Menkov took the gold with the Russian National record of 8.56 m while Rivera took the bronze medal with a jump of 8.27 m.

Rivera was given the National Sports Award in 2013 for his performances.

== Personal life ==
Rivera earned his bachelor's degree in industrial engineering from Arizona before earning his master's degree in electrical engineering from the Monterrey Institute of Technology and Higher Education (ITESM). He subsequently earned his PhD in industrial engineering from ITESM.

His brother, Edgar Rivera, competes in the high jump. Two other brothers, Adrián and Jorge, also compete in athletics. A documentary about the Rivera quartet, called El gran salto, was released in 2021.

In May 2021, Rivera announced his candidacy for the municipal president of Agua Prieta, challenging incumbent Jesús Alfonso Montaño Durazo, cousin of Governor Alfonso Durazo.

== Teaching Careerer ==
After earning his PhD, Rivera soon began to teach pre-calculus, AP and standard geometry at Douglas High School in Douglas, Arizona, a town closely linked as the sister city of Agua Prieta, Sonora.

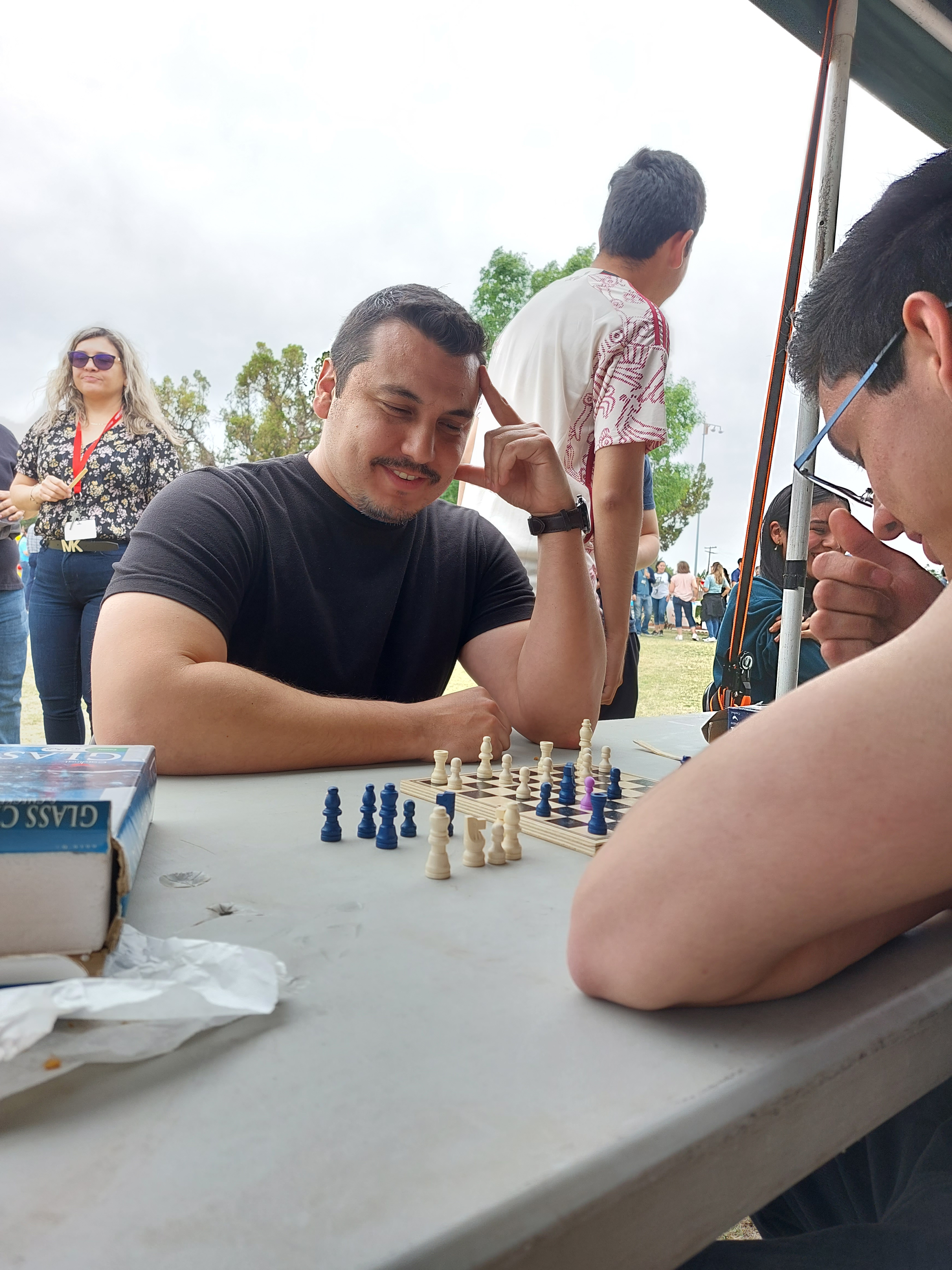
Rivera playing chess against a student during Teacher Appreciation Week

"I don't have this class, i'm just here because my boyfriend is" - Girlfriend of a student of Rivera

"O te toca un profe que sabe enseñar o con el que sacas curas, y en la clase del Rivera las curas nunca faltaron." - Former student of Rivera

== Competition record ==
Year	Competition	Venue	Position	Event	Notes
Representing Mexico
2004	Central American and Caribbean Junior Championships	Coatzacoalcos, Mexico	3rd	Triple jump	14.56 m
2007	NACAC Championships	San Salvador, El Salvador	6th	Long jump	7.43 m
2010	Ibero-American Championships	San Fernando, Spain	8th	Long jump	7.48 m
2010	Central American and Caribbean Games	Mayagüez, Puerto Rico	7th	Long jump	7.43 m
2011	Central American and Caribbean Championships	Mayagüez, Puerto Rico	8th	Long jump	7.32 m
2011	Universiade	Shenzhen, China	28th (q)	Long jump	7.23 m
2012	Olympic Games	London, United Kingdom	32nd (q)	Long jump	7.42 m
2013	Universiade	Kazan, Russia	1st	Long jump	8.46 m
2013	World Championships	Moscow, Russia	3rd	Long jump	8.27 m
2014	World Indoor Championships	Sopot, Poland	7th	Long jump	7.93 m
2014	Ibero-American Championships	São Paulo, Brazil	1st	Long jump	8.24 m
2015	Pan American Games	Toronto, Canada	9th	Long jump	7.63 m (w)
