= 2008 World Junior Championships in Athletics – Men's long jump =

The men's long jump event at the 2008 World Junior Championships in Athletics was held in Bydgoszcz, Poland, at Zawisza Stadium on 8 and 9 July.

== Medalists ==
Gold	Marquise Goodwin; United States
Silver	Dzmitry Astrouski; Belarus
Bronze	Eusebio Cáceres; Spain

== Results ==
=== Final ===
9 July

Rank	Name	Nationality	Attempts						Result	Notes
Rank	Name	Nationality	1	2	3	4	5	6	Result	Notes
1st place, gold medalist(s)	Marquise Goodwin	United States	7.74 (w: -1.0 m/s)	x	7.62 (w: -0.2 m/s)	7.51 (w: -0.3 m/s)	x	7.48 (w: -0.4 m/s)	7.74 (w: -1.0 m/s)	
2nd place, silver medalist(s)	Dzmitry Astrouski	Belarus	7.64 (w: -1.4 m/s)	5.50 (w: -0.3 m/s)	5.55 (w: -0.3 m/s)	7.27 (w: -0.5 m/s)	7.27 (w: -0.1 m/s)	6.98 (w: -0.3 m/s)	7.64 (w: -1.4 m/s)	
3rd place, bronze medalist(s)	Eusebio Cáceres	Spain	7.41 (w: -0.3 m/s)	x	7.45 (w: -0.5 m/s)	x	7.38 (w: -0.4 m/s)	7.59 (w: -0.2 m/s)	7.59 (w: -0.2 m/s)	
4	Mubarak Al-Jaseer	Saudi Arabia	7.40 (w: -0.8 m/s)	7.57 (w: -1.1 m/s)	7.20 (w: -0.4 m/s)	7.35 (w: 0.0 m/s)	7.41 (w: -0.1 m/s)	7.13 (w: 0.0 m/s)	7.57 (w: -1.1 m/s)	
5	Roni Ollikainen	Finland	7.43 (w: -1.2 m/s)	x	7.46 (w: -0.1 m/s)	7.24 (w: -0.5 m/s)	7.31 (w: 0.0 m/s)	7.43 (w: -0.5 m/s)	7.46 (w: -0.1 m/s)	
6	Stefan Brits	South Africa	7.29 (w: -1.6 m/s)	7.24 (w: -0.3 m/s)	7.42 (w: -0.5 m/s)	7.17 (w: -0.8 m/s)	7.18 (w: -0.1 m/s)	7.07 (w: -0.8 m/s)	7.42 (w: -0.5 m/s)	
7	Christian Taylor	United States	7.37 (w: -0.7 m/s)	x	7.41 (w: -0.1 m/s)	7.22 (w: -0.3 m/s)	7.02 (w: -0.6 m/s)	7.22 (w: -0.2 m/s)	7.41 (w: -0.1 m/s)	
8	Julian Howard	Germany	6.99 (w: -0.9 m/s)	7.40 (w: -0.3 m/s)	7.38 (w: 0.0 m/s)	7.27 (w: -0.2 m/s)	7.38 (w: -0.3 m/s)	7.30 (w: -0.2 m/s)	7.40 (w: -0.3 m/s)	
9	Jhamal Bowen	Panama	x	7.14 (w: -0.2 m/s)	7.35 (w: -0.4 m/s)				7.35 (w: -0.4 m/s)	
10	Dániel Ecseki	Hungary	7.16 (w: -1.1 m/s)	7.21 (w: -0.1 m/s)	7.08 (w: -0.4 m/s)				7.21 (w: -0.1 m/s)	
11	Tarik Batchelor	Jamaica	x	6.93 (w: -0.3 m/s)	7.02 (w: -0.4 m/s)				7.02 (w: -0.4 m/s)	
12	Marcos Chuva	Portugal	x	x	6.73 (w: -0.5 m/s)				6.73 (w: -0.5 m/s)	

=== Qualifications ===
8 July

==== Group A ====
Rank	Name	Nationality	Attempts			Result	Notes
Rank	Name	Nationality	1	2	3	Result	Notes
1	Marquise Goodwin	United States	7.60 (w: -1.8 m/s)	7.07 (w: -0.4 m/s)	7.59 (w: -0.5 m/s)	7.60 (w: -1.8 m/s)	q
2	Roni Ollikainen	Finland	7.38 (w: -2.6 m/s)	6.85 (w: -0.2 m/s)	7.12 (w: -0.1 m/s)	7.38 (w: -2.6 m/s)	q
3	Tarik Batchelor	Jamaica	7.14 (w: -0.5 m/s)	x	7.36 (w: -2.2 m/s)	7.36 (w: -2.2 m/s)	q
4	Stefan Brits	South Africa	7.07 (w: -0.3 m/s)	7.32 (w: -0.6 m/s)	x	7.32 (w: -0.6 m/s)	q
5	Julian Howard	Germany	6.99 (w: -0.6 m/s)	7.25 (w: -2.4 m/s)	7.30 (w: -1.5 m/s)	7.30 (w: -1.5 m/s)	q
6	Youn Il	South Korea	7.01 (w: -1.8 m/s)	7.23 (w: -2.1 m/s)	6.90 (w: -0.2 m/s)	7.23 (w: -2.1 m/s)	
7	Eddy Florián	Dominican Republic	7.18 (w: -0.4 m/s)	x	7.22 (w: -1.5 m/s)	7.22 (w: -1.5 m/s)	
8	Soshi Arita	Japan	7.19 (w: -0.1 m/s)	6.91 (w: -0.9 m/s)	x	7.19 (w: -0.1 m/s)	
9	Álvaro Munguía	Spain	x	5.41 (w: -0.7 m/s)	7.17 (w: -0.5 m/s)	7.17 (w: -0.5 m/s)	
10	Willian Barrionuevo	Brazil	7.15 (w: -2.6 m/s)	6.88 (w: -0.3 m/s)	6.78 (w: -0.5 m/s)	7.15 (w: -2.6 m/s)	
11	Guillaume Victorin	France	7.01 (w: -0.9 m/s)	x	7.08 (w: -0.8 m/s)	7.08 (w: -0.8 m/s)	
12	Gregory Bianchi	Switzerland	6.99 (w: -2.1 m/s)	7.02 (w: -0.8 m/s)	6.77 (w: -0.5 m/s)	7.02 (w: -0.8 m/s)	
13	Gadi Ohayon	Israel	6.93 (w: -0.1 m/s)	6.43 (w: -2.1 m/s)	6.90 (w: -1.1 m/s)	6.93 (w: -0.1 m/s)	
14	Zachariasz Dereziński	Poland	x	x	6.87 (w: -0.4 m/s)	6.87 (w: -0.4 m/s)	
15	Wang Ming-En	Chinese Taipei	6.74 (w: -0.5 m/s)	6.85 (w: -1.3 m/s)	6.57 (w: -1.2 m/s)	6.85 (w: -1.3 m/s)	
	Lenyn Leonce	Saint Lucia	x	x	x	NM	

==== Group B ====
Rank	Name	Nationality	Attempts			Result	Notes
Rank	Name	Nationality	1	2	3	Result	Notes
1	Eusebio Cáceres	Spain	7.27 (w: -0.8 m/s)	x	7.77 (w: -1.8 m/s)	7.77 (w: -1.8 m/s)	Q
2	Christian Taylor	United States	7.53 (w: -1.9 m/s)	6.97 (w: -0.7 m/s)	7.68 (w: -1.8 m/s)	7.68 (w: -1.8 m/s)	q
3	Dzmitry Astrouski	Belarus	7.56 (w: -1.3 m/s)	-	-	7.56 (w: -1.3 m/s)	q
4	Dániel Ecseki	Hungary	7.27 (w: 0.0 m/s)	7.55 (w: -1.6 m/s)	7.32 (w: -0.1 m/s)	7.55 (w: -1.6 m/s)	q
5	Jhamal Bowen	Panama	7.48 (w: -1.7 m/s)	7.44 (w: -2.2 m/s)	7.33 (w: -0.9 m/s)	7.48 (w: -1.7 m/s)	q
6	Mubarak Al-Jaseer	Saudi Arabia	7.48 (w: -1.6 m/s)	x	7.33 (w: -1.7 m/s)	7.48 (w: -1.6 m/s)	q
7	Marcos Chuva	Portugal	7.39 (w: -1.2 m/s)	x	x	7.39 (w: -1.2 m/s)	q
8	Dino Pervan	Croatia	6.96 (w: -0.7 m/s)	7.25 (w: -1.8 m/s)	7.13 (w: -1.2 m/s)	7.25 (w: -1.8 m/s)	
9	Artak Hambardzumyan	Armenia	x	x	7.15 (w: -2.2 m/s)	7.15 (w: -2.2 m/s)	
10	Carlos de Moraes Jr.	Brazil	7.11 (w: 0.0 m/s)	x	x	7.11 (w: 0.0 m/s)	
11	Riaan Arends	South Africa	6.89 (w: -0.2 m/s)	6.99 (w: -1.5 m/s)	6.80 (w: -0.3 m/s)	6.99 (w: -1.5 m/s)	
12	Yinon Israeli	Israel	6.60 (w: -2.4 m/s)	x	6.99 (w: -0.4 m/s)	6.99 (w: -0.4 m/s)	
13	Sheryf El-Sheryf	Ukraine	6.94 (w: -0.4 m/s)	6.81 (w: NWI)	6.58 (w: -1.1 m/s)	6.94 (w: -0.4 m/s)	
14	Tomasz Dula	Poland	6.74 (w: -1.3 m/s)	6.89 (w: -2.3 m/s)	6.84 (w: 0.0 m/s)	6.89 (w: -2.3 m/s)	

== Participation ==
According to an unofficial count, 30 athletes from 24 countries participated in the event.

- Armenia (1)
- Belarus (1)
- Brazil (2)
- Chinese Taipei (1)
- Croatia (1)
- Dominican Republic (1)
- Finland (1)
- France (1)
- Germany (1)
- Hungary (1)
- Israel (2)
- Jamaica (1)
- Japan (1)
- Panama (1)
- Poland (2)
- Portugal (1)
- Saint Lucia (1)
- Saudi Arabia (1)
- South Africa (2)
- South Korea (1)
- Spain (2)
- Switzerland (1)
- Ukraine (1)
- United States (2)
