= 2010 Latvian Athletics Championships =

- Edition: 20th
- Dates: 9–10 July
- Host city: Jēkabpils, Latvia

The 2010 Latvian Athletics Championships were held in Jēkabpils, Latvia on July 9–10, 2010.

== Men ==
Event	Gold		Silver		Bronze	
100 m	Ronalds Arājs	10.45	Jānis Mezītis	10.79	Gatis Zālītis	10.82
200 m	Elvijs Misāns	21.87	Jānis Mezītis	22.57	Edgars Miļus	22.65
400 m	Dmitrijs Miļkevičs	48.07	Andris Ūdris	49.52	Renārs Stepiņš	50.01
800 m	Kristaps Valters	1:51.71	Oskars Bormanis	1:55.30	Deivids Bandars	1:55.45
1 500 m	Konstantīns Savčuks	3:55.47	Jānis Višķers	3:56.45	Jaroslavs Halimoškins	4:07.54
3 000 m	Mareks Florošeks	8:37.89	Jānis Girgensons	8:45.45	Andrejs Domanins	8:51.00
5 000 m	Mareks Florošeks	14:50.52	Andrejs Domanins	15:18.59	Edgars Brigmanis	15:25.54
4 × 100 m	Juris Kožeurovs; Henrijs Arājs; Ēvalds Zunda; Ronalds Arājs	42.18	Elvijs Misāns; Sandis Džiguns; Māris Grēniņš; Armands Avens	42.44	Jānis Mezītis; Guntis Bērziņš; Gatis Zālītis; Roberts Vidžus	42.83
4 × 400 m	Deivids Banders; Oskars Bormanis; Kristaps Valters; Jānis Leitis	3:24.80	Maksims Semjonovs; Ēriks Laugalis; Jānis Dejus; Edgars Miļus	3:30.05	Arturs Onzuls; Kārlis Dermaks; Edgars Čeporjus; Igors Saveiko	3:40.16
110 m hurdles	Kārlis Daube	13.97	Māris Grēniņš	14.72	Sandris Metlovs	15.19
400 m hurdles	Andrejs Romaņivs	54.23	Andris Ūdris	54.35	Pauls Leikarts	55.57
3 000 m steeplechase	Konstantīns Savčuks	9:26.83	Kaspars Gulbis	9:38.09	Aigars Matisons	9:49.06
Triple Jump	Elvijs Misāns	15.78	Guntis Bērziņš	14.30	Edijs Leveika	14.09
Long Jump	Jānis Leitis	7.43	Guntis Bērziņš	7.03	Roberts Auzāns	6.77
High Jump	Toms Andersons	2.12	Mārtiņš Karabeško	2.06	Jānis Vaivods	2.03
Pole Vault	Pauls Pujāts	5.20	Kārlis Pujāts	5.10	Mareks Ārents	5.10
Shot Put	Māris Urtāns	17.36	Oskars Vaisjūns	16.11	Arnis Žviriņš	15.81
Hammer Throw	Igors Sokolovs	77.21	Ainārs Vaičulēns	66.59	Edgars Gailis	59.80
Discus Throw	Oskars Vaisjūns	56.30	Daniils Merkulovs	47.30	Atis Vaisjūns	44.32
Javelin Throw	Ēriks Rags	80.08	Kārlis Alainis	79.00	Zigismunds Sirmais	70.14

== Women ==
Event	Gold		Silver		Bronze	
100 m	Jekaterina Čekele	11.54	Sandra Krūma	11.75	Marlēna Reimane	11.99
200 m	Sandra Krūma	24.21	Marlēna Reimane	24.76	Ieva Vītola	25.19
400 m	Ieva Zunda	54.61	Līga Velvere	56.18	Ieva Vītola	57.83
800 m	Anna Titova	2:09.06	Jeļena Ābele	2:12.78	Gunita Šale	2:17.35
1 500 m	Anete Midrijāne	4:46.96	Linda Batņa	4:47.94	Baiba Medne	4:50.96
3 000 m	Anete Midrijāne	10:31.42	Baiba Medne	10:37.79	Jekaterina Medvedeva	10:40.20
5 000 m	Inna Poluškina	17:09.51	Liene Pūķe	18:55.85		
4 × 100 m	Ieva Vītola; Silva Silkalne; Linda Cepurīte; Laura Orlovska	49.29	Lelde Krūmiņa; Nikija Pujāte; Elfa Misāne; Jūlija Gapaka	49.35	Elīna Romonovska; Ilva Janīte; Sindija Virse; Zanda Marta Grava	49.86
4 × 400 m	Paula Rozenvalde; Ieva Kalniņa; Ilze Rūtenberga; Zanda Marta Grava	4:10.59	Lelde Krūmiņa; Jekaterina Medvedeva; Elfa Misāne; Marlēna Reimane	4:10.76	Ieva Vītola; Silva Silkalne; Lāsma Grīnberga; Gunta Meijere	4:25.67
100 m hurdles	Laura Ikauniece	14.48	Ilona Dramačonoka	15.59	Zanda Marta Grava	15.66
400 m hurdles	Inese Nagle	1:04.34	Paula Rozenvalde	1:07.26	Ilona Dramačonoka	1:07.64
3 000 m steeplechase	Lāsma Grīnberga	11:18.71	Irīna Pankoka Štūla	11:29.65	Gunta Meijere	12:40.49
Triple Jump	Santa Matule	13.18	Māra Grīva	13.16	Elfa Misāne	12.11
Long Jump	Māra Grīva	6.26	Nikija Pujāte	5.72	Elfa Misāne	5.65
High Jump	Laura Ikauniece	1.78	Jeļena Feņuka	1.69	Māra Kesnere	1.66
Pole Vault	Ilze Bortašķenoka	3.80	Maira Blūma	3.50		
Shot Put	Aiga Grabuste	13.82	Linda Ozola	12.60	Dace Šteinerte	12.49
Hammer Throw	Laura Igaune	58.23				
Discus Throw	Dace Šteinerte	44.85	Inga Miķelsone	43.73	Diāna Ozoliņa	40.93
Javelin Throw	Madara Palameika	59.41	Sinta Ozoliņa-Kovala	57.58	Kristīne Buša	49.48
