= Andreas Otterling =

Swedish long jumper

Medal record

Men's athletics

Representing Sweden

European Indoor Championships
Bronze medal – third place	2015 Prague	Long jump

Andreas Otterling (born 25 May 1986) is a Swedish athlete who competes in long jump. At the 2015 athletic championships in Prague Otterling won bronze after an 8,06 meter jump.

== Competition record ==
Year	Competition	Venue	Position	Event	Notes
Representing Sweden
2011	European Indoor Championships	Paris, France	18th (q)	Long jump	7.63 m
2012	European Championships	Helsinki, Finland	–	Long jump	NM
2013	European Indoor Championships	Gothenburg, Sweden	22nd (q)	Long jump	7.39 m
2015	European Indoor Championships	Prague, Czech Republic	3rd	Long jump	8.06 m
