= Arsen Sargsyan =

Armenian long jumper

Personal information
- Born: December 13, 1984 (age 41) Vanadzor, Armenian SSR
- Height: 1.89 m (6 ft 2 1/2 in)
- Weight: 76 kg (168 lb)

Sport
- Country: Armenia
- Sport: Athletics
- Event: Long jump
- Updated on 15 August 2012

Arsen Sargsyan (Armenian: Արսեն Սարգսյան, born 13 December 1984) is an Armenian long jumper.

He competed at the 2001 World Youth Championships and the 2009 European Indoor Championships without reaching the final. He competed at the 2012 Summer Olympics in the men's long jump. Sargsyan took 20th place in qualifying round at the 2013 European Athletics Indoor Championships with a jump of 7.44 meters. His personal best jump is 8.02 metres, achieved in May 2008 in Artashat.

== Competition record ==
| Year | Competition | Venue | Position | Event | Notes |
Representing Armenia
| 2001 | World Youth Championships | Debrecen, Hungary | 32nd (q) | Long jump | 6.43 m |
| 2003 | European Junior Championships | Tampere, Finland | 11th | Long jump | 7.09 m |
| 2005 | European U23 Championships | Erfurt, Germany | 19th (q) | Long jump | 7.16 m (wind: -1.2 m/s) |
| 2005 | Universiade | İzmir, Turkey | 24th (q) | Long jump | 7.18 m |
| 2005 | Universiade | İzmir, Turkey | 16th | Triple jump | 14.45 m |
| 2009 | European Indoor Championships | Turin, Italy | 20th (q) | Long jump | 7.53 m |
| 2010 | World Indoor Championships | Doha, Qatar | 26th (q) | Long jump | 7.45 m |
| 2010 | European Championships | Barcelona, Spain | 25th (q) | Long jump | 7.60 m |
| 2012 | European Championships | Helsinki, Finland | 29th (q) | Long jump | 7.47 m |
| 2012 | Olympic Games | London, United Kingdom | 25th (q) | Long jump | 7.62 m |
| 2013 | European Indoor Championships | Gothenburg, Sweden | 20th (q) | Long jump | 7.44 m |
| 2013 | Jeux de la Francophonie | Nice, France | 5th | Long jump | 7.76 m (w) |
| 2014 | World Indoor Championships | Sopot, Poland | 17th (q) | Long jump | 7.39 m |
