= 2013 World Championships in Athletics – Men's long jump =

Men's long jump at the 2013 World Championships in Athletics

Men's long jump at the 2013 World Championships
- Venue: Luzhniki Stadium
- Dates: 14 August (qualification); 16 August (final)
- Competitors: 29 from 22 nations
- Winning distance: 8.56 m (28 ft 1 in)

Medalists
gold medal	Aleksandr Menkov; Russia
silver medal	Ignisious Gaisah; Netherlands
bronze medal	Luis Rivera; Mexico

The men's long jump at the 2013 World Championships in Athletics was held at the Luzhniki Stadium on 14–16 August.

== Records ==
Prior to the competition, the records were as follows:

World record	Mike Powell (USA)	8.95	Tokyo, Japan	30 August 1991
Championship record	Mike Powell (USA)	8.95	Tokyo, Japan	30 August 1991
World leading	Luis Alberto Rivera (MEX)	8.46	Kazan, Russia	12 July 2013
African record	Godfrey Khotso Mokoena (RSA)	8.50	Madrid, Spain	4 July 2009
Asian record	Mohamed Salman Al Khuwalidi (KSA)	8.48	Sotteville, France	2 July 2006
North, Central American and Caribbean record	Mike Powell (USA)	8.95	Tokyo, Japan	30 August 1991
South American record	Irving Saladino (PAN)	8.73	Hengelo, Netherlands	24 May 2008
European record	Robert Emmiyan (URS)	8.86	Tsaghkadzor, Soviet Union	22 May 1987
Oceanian record	Mitchell Watt (AUS)	8.54	Stockholm, Sweden	29 July 2011

== Qualification standards ==
A result	B result
8.25	8.10

== Schedule ==
Date	Time	Round
14 August 2013	10:25	Qualification
16 August 2013	19:30	Final

All times are local times (UTC+4)

== Results ==
KEY:	Q	Qualified	q	12 best performers	NR	National record	PB	Personal best	SB	Seasonal best

=== Qualification ===
Qualification: Qualifying performance 8.10 (Q) or at least 12 best performers (q).

Rank	Group	Name	Nationality	No. 1	No. 2	No. 3	Mark	Notes
1	B	Eusebio Cáceres	Spain	8.25			8.25	Q
2	B	Godfrey Khotso Mokoena	South Africa	7.68	7.96	8.16	8.16	Q
3	B	Aleksandr Menkov	Russia	7.95	x	8.11	8.11	Q
4	A	Christian Reif	Germany	8.09			8.09	q
5	A	Luis Rivera	Mexico	7.78	x	8.04	8.04	q
6	B	Louis Tsatoumas	Greece	x	x	8.00	8.00	q
7	A	Damar Forbes	Jamaica	7.77	x	7.96	7.96	q
8	A	Li Jinzhe	China	x	7.70	7.96	7.96	q
9	B	Dwight Phillips	United States	7.95	7.73	7.73	7.95	q, SB
10	A	Sebastian Bayer	Germany	7.95	x	x	7.95	q
11	A	Mauro Vinícius da Silva	Brazil	7.81	7.92	x	7.92	q
12	B	Ignisious Gaisah	Netherlands	7.89	7.85	7.78	7.89	q
13	A	Tyrone Smith	Bermuda	7.89	7.72	7.41	7.89	
14	A	Greg Rutherford	Great Britain & N.I.	7.81	7.57	7.87	7.87	
15	A	Sergey Polyanskiy	Russia	7.82	6.86	x	7.82	
16	B	Marcos Chuva	Portugal	x	x	7.82	7.82	
17	A	Zarck Visser	South Africa	7.78	x	7.79	7.79	
18	B	Alyn Camara	Germany	7.77	x	x	7.77	
19	A	Michel Tornéus	Sweden	7.75	7.71	x	7.75	
20	A	George Kitchens	United States	7.75	7.56	7.63	7.75	
21	B	Salim Sdiri	France	7.64	7.55	6.36	7.64	
22	B	Ndiss Kaba Badji	Senegal	7.59	7.62	7.61	7.62	
23	B	Wang Jianan	China	7.59	7.57	7.57	7.59	
24	A	Izmir Smajlaj	Albania	7.55	x	7.25	7.55	
25	B	Adrian Vasile	Romania	7.32	7.52	7.21	7.52	
26	A	Konstantin Safronov	Kazakhstan	7.47	7.34	x	7.47	
27	B	Marquis Dendy	United States	6.43	7.21	7.36	7.36	
28	A	Quincy Breell	Aruba	7.10	x	x	7.10	
	B	Fabrice Lapierre	Australia	x	x	x	NM	

=== Final ===
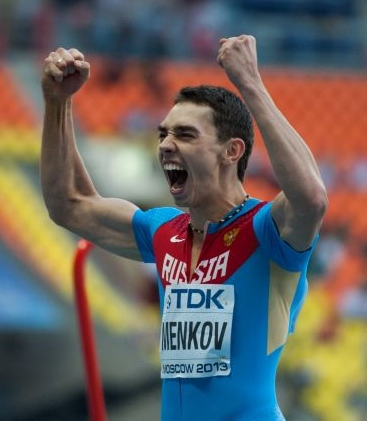
Gold medalist Aleksandr Menkov from Russia

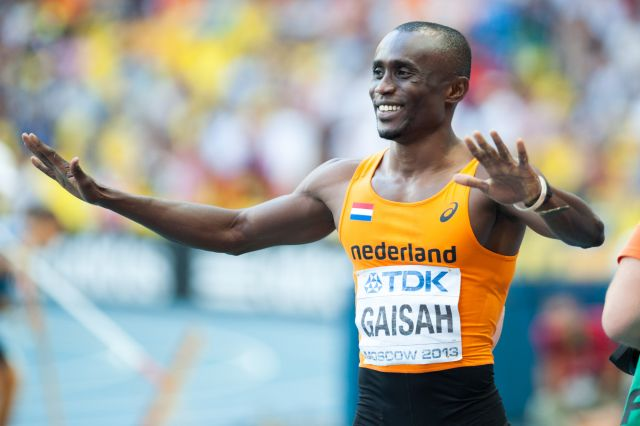
Silver medalist Ignisious Gaisah from the Netherlands

The final was started at 19:30.

Rank	Name	Nationality	No. 1	No. 2	No. 3	No. 4	No. 5	No. 6	Mark	Note
1st place, gold medalist(s)	Aleksandr Menkov	Russia	8.14	7.96	8.52	8.43	8.56	x	8.56	WL, NR
2nd place, silver medalist(s)	Ignisious Gaisah	Netherlands	8.09	8.15	8.17	8.29	x	8.16	8.29	NR
3rd place, bronze medalist(s)	Luis Rivera	Mexico	7.92	8.16	8.17	8.03	8.27	x	8.27	
4	Eusebio Cáceres	Spain	8.09	8.25	8.17	x	8.26	8.20	8.26	
5	Mauro Vinícius da Silva	Brazil	x	x	8.09	8.05	8.23	8.24	8.24	
6	Christian Reif	Germany	8.18	x	8.22	8.12	8.12	7.96	8.22	
7	Godfrey Khotso Mokoena	South Africa	8.00	7.91	7.87	7.93	8.01	8.10	8.10	
8	Damar Forbes	Jamaica	8.02	7.89	x	x	8.00	x	8.02	
9	Sebastian Bayer	Germany	7.98	x	7.92				7.98	
10	Louis Tsatoumas	Greece	x	x	7.98				7.98	
11	Dwight Phillips	United States	x	7.87	7.88				7.88	
12	Li Jinzhe	China	7.79	7.70	7.86				7.86	
