= Elvijs Misāns =

Latvian athlete

Personal information
- Born: April 8, 1989 (age 37) Sigulda, Latvian SSR
- Height: 1.90 m (6 ft 3 in)
- Weight: 72 kg (159 lb)

Sport
- Country: Latvia
- Sport: Athletics
- Event(s): Long jump Triple jump Sprint

Elvijs Misāns (born 8 April 1989 in Sigulda) is a Latvian athlete usually competing in long jump and triple jump. His personal bests are 8.08 metres in long jump and 17.02 metres in triple jump.

== International competitions ==
Year	Competition	Venue	Position	Event	Notes
Representing Latvia
2006	World Junior Championships	Beijing, China	42nd (h)	200 m	22.05 s (-0.6 m/s)
2009	European U23 Championships	Kaunas, Lithuania	15th (q)	Triple jump	15.56 m (-1.0 m/s)
2009	Latvian Championships	Ventspils, Latvia	3rd	Triple jump	15.28 m
2010	Latvian Championships	Jēkabpils, Latvia	1st	200 m	21.87 s
2010	Latvian Championships	Jēkabpils, Latvia	1st	Triple jump	15.78 m
2011	European Indoor Championships	Paris, France	10th	Long jump	7.86 m
2011	European U23 Championships	Ostrava, Czech Republic	6th	100m	10.63 s (-1.5 m/s)
2011	European U23 Championships	Ostrava, Czech Republic	5th	Long jump	7.72 m (+0.4 m/s)
2011	Summer Universiade	Shenzhen, China	6th	Triple jump	16.58 m
2013	European Indoor Championships	Gothenburg, Sweden	8th	Long jump	7.92 m
2014	European Championships	Zürich, Switzerland	10th	Long jump	7.76 m
2015	European Indoor Championships	Prague, Czech Republic	–	Long jump	NM
2015	Summer Universiade	Gwangju, South Korea	34th (q)	Long jump	5.41 m
2016	European Championships	Amsterdam, Netherlands	9th	Triple jump	16.32 m
2017	European Indoor Championships	Belgrade, Serbia	8th (q)	Long jump	7.72 m^{1}
2017	European Indoor Championships	Belgrade, Serbia	4th	Triple jump	17.02 m
2017	World Championships	London, United Kingdom	10th	Triple jump	16.55 m
2018	European Championships	Berlin, Germany	17th (q)	Triple jump	16.26 m
2019	European Indoor Championships	Glasgow, United Kingdom	16th (q)	Triple jump	16.16 m

^{1}No mark in the final

== Personal bests ==
Event	Record	Venue	Year
100 metres	10.37 s	Riga, Latvia	2011
200 metres	20.91 s	Valmiera, Latvia	2011
Long jump	8.08 m	Saldus, Latvia	2016
Triple jump	17.02 m (i)	Belgrade, Serbia	2017
