= Kevin Ojiaku =

Nigerian and Italian long jumper

Personal information
- Nationality: Nigerian and Italian
- Born: 20 April 1989 (age 37) Ivrea
- Height: 1.95 m (6 ft 5 in)
- Weight: 75 kg (165 lb)

Sport
- Country: Italy
- Sport: Athletics
- Event: Long jump
- Club: G.S. Fiamme Gialle

Achievements and titles
- Personal bests: Long j. outdoor: 8.20 m (2017); Long j. indoor: 7.93 m (2017); High jump: 2.10 m (2007)

Kevin Ojiaku (born 20 April 1989) is a Nigerian and Italian male long jumper. Born in Italy by an Italian mother and Nigerian father.

== Biography ==
Of Nigerian and Italian citizenship, he obtained the IAAF qualification standard, on 27 July 2017 he is selected by Italy national athletics team's technic commissioner, Elio Locatelli, to participate in the 2017 World Championships in Athletics.

His Personal Best of 8.20 m, set in 2017, is the 4th best ever Italian performance and 21h in the 2017 world season list until the beginning of the 2017 World Championships in Athletics.

== Personal best ==
- Long jump outdoor: 8.20 m - (Italy) Turin, 21 May 2017
- Long jump indoor: 7.93 m - (Italy) Ancona, 18 February 2017

== Achievements ==
Year	Competition	Venue	Position	Event	Performance	Notes
2013	European Indoor Championships	(Sweden) Gothenburg	17th (q)	Long jump	7.56 m	
2017	European Team Championships	(France) Lille	7th	Long jump	7.54 m	
2017	World Championships	(United Kingdom) London	18th (q)	Long jump	7.82 m	

== See also ==
- Italian all-time lists - long jump
- Naturalized athletes of Italy
