= Darius Aučyna =

Lithuanian long jumper (born 1989)

Personal information
- Born: May 7, 1989

Sport
- Sport: Athletics
- Event: Long jump

Darius Aučyna (born 7 May 1989) is a retired Lithuanian long jumper.

He finished eleventh at the 2009 European U23 Championships, fourth at the 2011 European U23 Championships, eighth at the 2011 Summer Universiade and tenth at the 2013 Summer Universiade. He also competed at the 2009, 2011 and 2013 European Indoor Championships without reaching the final.

In the triple jump he finished eighth at the 2011 European U23 Championships. He competed at the 2013 European Indoor Championships without reaching the final.

His personal best jump is 8.11 metres, achieved in September 2012 in Artashat. He also had 16.84 metres in the triple jump, achieved in July 2012 in Kaunas.
