= Sergey Polyanskiy =

Russian long jumper (born 1989)

Sergey Polyanskiy (born 29 October 1989) is a Russian athlete who specialises in the long jump. His best result to date is the 8th place at the 2015 World Championships and the fourth place at the 2013 Summer Universiade in Kazan. He also competed at the 2013 World Championships in Moscow without reaching the final.

He has personal bests of 8.16 metres outdoors (2013) and 7.92 metres indoors (2011).

== Competition record ==
Representing Russia
Year	Competition	Venue	Position	Event	Notes
2009	Universiade	Belgrade, Serbia	5th	Long jump	7.79 m (w)
2011	European Indoor Championships	Paris, France	14th (q)	Long jump	7.81 m
2013	Universiade	Kazan, Russia	4th	Long jump	8.14 m
2013	World Championships	Moscow, Russia	15th (q)	Long jump	7.82 m
2015	World Championships	Beijing, China	8th	Long jump	7.97 m
