= Athletics at the 2013 Summer Universiade – Men's long jump =

The men's long jump event at the 2013 Summer Universiade was held on 11–12 July.

== Medalists ==
Gold	Silver	Bronze
Luis Rivera; Mexico	Aleksandr Menkov; Russia	Marcos Chuva; Portugal

== Results ==
=== Qualification ===
Qualification: 7.85 m (Q) or at least 12 best (q) qualified for the final.

Rank	Group	Athlete	Nationality	#1	#2	#3	Result	Notes
1	A	Sergey Polyanskiy	Russia	8.12			8.12	Q
2	A	Larona Koosimile	Botswana	7.79	7.93		7.93	Q, PB
3	A	Luis Rivera	Mexico	7.90			7.90	Q
4	A	Marcos Chuva	Portugal	7.85			7.85	Q, SB
5	B	Aleksandr Menkov	Russia	7.83	–	–	7.83	q
6	A	Darius Aučyna	Lithuania	x	x	7.78w	7.78w	q
7	B	Mamadou Gueye	Senegal	7.35	7.57	7.75w	7.75w	q
8	A	Kirill Agoyev	Kazakhstan	7.68	x	7.68w	7.68	q
9	B	Taylor Stewart	Canada	x	7.62	x	7.62	q
10	B	Julian Howard	Germany	7.50	7.50	7.60	7.60	q
11	B	Marius Vadeikis	Lithuania	7.60	7.41	x	7.60	q
12	B	Alper Kulaksız	Turkey	x	x	7.58	7.58	q
13	A	Daniel Pineda	Chile	7.29	7.41w	7.56w	7.56w	
14	B	Ruri Rammokolodi	Botswana	x	x	7.54w	7.54w	
15	B	Collister Fahie	United States Virgin Islands	7.19	7.46	7.48	7.48	
16	B	Marcos Caldeira	Portugal	7.37	7.41	x	7.41	
17	A	Leon Hunt	United States Virgin Islands	7.41	x	x	7.41	
18	B	Mihkel Kase	Estonia	7.32	7.11	6.92	7.32	
19	A	Andy Grech	Malta	7.10	x	x	7.10	PB
20	B	Emmanuel Aggrey	Ghana	7.05	6.59	6.50	7.05	
21	A	Lahiru Dilankara	Sri Lanka	x	6.92w	x	6.92w	
22	B	Jonathan Pengel	Netherlands	x	6.91	x	6.91	SB
23	A	Muhammad Jahangeer	Pakistan	6.77	x	6.39w	6.77	
24	A	Kevin Philbert	Curaçao	6.77	6.31	–	6.77	
25	A	Dhanunjaya Pulugu	India	x	6.71w	x	6.71w	
26	B	Jethro Kwenani	Namibia	5.64	x	–	5.64	
	A	Andreas Jeppesen	Denmark	x	x	x	NM	
	A	Yoeri Stieglis	Netherlands	x	x	x	NM	
	A	David Conteh	Sierra Leone				DNS	
	B	Stanley Gbagbeke	Nigeria				DNS	
	B	Julian Kellerer	Austria				DNS	
	B	Su Xiongfeng	China				DNS	

=== Final ===
Rank	Athlete	Nationality	#1	#2	#3	#4	#5	#6	Result	Notes
1st place, gold medalist(s)	Luis Rivera	Mexico	x	8.08	x	8.46	8.12	x	8.46	WL, UR, NR
2nd place, silver medalist(s)	Aleksandr Menkov	Russia	7.90	8.03	x	8.16	8.42	8.34	8.42	PB
3rd place, bronze medalist(s)	Marcos Chuva	Portugal	7.77	8.07	x	7.69	x	8.15	8.15	SB
4	Sergey Polyanskiy	Russia	x	8.14	x	8.04	x	8.06w	8.14	
5	Julian Howard	Germany	x	7.71	7.75	8.00	x	7.86	8.00	
6	Taylor Stewart	Canada	x	7.80	x	x	x	x	7.80	PB
7	Alper Kulaksız	Turkey	x	7.68	x	x	x	7.53	7.68	SB
8	Larona Koosimile	Botswana	7.67	x	7.12	x	7.45	7.19	7.67	
9	Kirill Agoyev	Kazakhstan	x	x	7.57				7.57	
10	Darius Aučyna	Lithuania	7.49	7.38	7.24				7.49	
11	Marius Vadeikis	Lithuania	7.44	x	7.44				7.44	
12	Mamadou Gueye	Senegal	7.43	x	x				7.43	
