= 2011 European Athletics Indoor Championships – Men's long jump =

The Men's long jump event at the 2011 European Athletics Indoor Championships was held on March 4, 2011, at 10:50 (qualification) and March 5, 16:25 (final) local time.

== Records ==
Standing records prior to the 2011 European Athletics Indoor Championships
World record	Carl Lewis (USA)	8.79	New York City, United States	27 January 1984
European record	Sebastian Bayer (GER)	8.71	Turin, Italy	8 March 2009
Championship record	Sebastian Bayer (GER)	8.71	Turin, Italy	8 March 2009
World Leading	Loúis Tsátoumas (GRE)	8.21	Peanía, Greece	19 February 2011
European Leading	Loúis Tsátoumas (GRE)	8.21	Peanía, Greece	19 February 2011

== Results ==
=== Qualification ===
Qualifying perf. 8.05 (Q) or 8 best performers (q) advanced to the Final The qualification was held at 10:50.

Rank	Group	Athlete	Nationality	#1	#2	#3	Result	Note
1	B	Teddy Tamgho	France	7.82	X	7.97	7.97	q
2	A	Morten Jensen	Denmark	7.96	X	X	7.96	q, =SB
3	B	Luis Méliz	Spain	7.94	7.85	7.91	7.94	q
4	A	Kafétien Gomis	France	7.88	7.85	7.91	7.91	q
5	A	Sebastian Bayer	Germany	7.91	7.73	7.84	7.91	q
6	B	Povilas Mykolaitis	Lithuania	7.90	X	7.82	7.90	q
7	A	Roman Novotný	Czech Republic	7.90	7.72	X	7.90	q
8	A	Michel Tornéus	Sweden	7.84	7.73	7.88	7.88	q
9	B	Salim Sdiri	France	7.62	7.88	X	7.88	
10	B	Elvijs Misāns	Latvia	7.86	X	7.75	7.86	
11	A	Eusebio Cáceres	Spain	X	7.81	7.83	7.83	
12	A	Andriy Makarchev	Ukraine	7.82	X	X	7.82	
13	B	Louis Tsatoumas	Greece	7.66	7.81	-	7.81	
14	B	Sergey Polyanskiy	Russia	X	7.81	X	7.81	
15	B	Kristinn Torfason	Iceland	7.72	7.73	7.73	7.73	
16	B	Štepán Wagner	Czech Republic	X	7.63	7.67	7.67	
17	A	Marcos Chuva	Portugal	7.65	7.35	7.62	7.65	
18	B	Andreas Otterling	Sweden	7.17	7.63	7.48	7.63	
19	B	Nils Winter	Germany	7.51	7.61	X	7.61	
20	A	Nikolay Atanasov	Bulgaria	7.57	7.51	X	7.57	
21	B	Vardan Pahlevanyan	Armenia	7.25	7.43	X	7.43	
22	A	Petteri Lax	Finland	7.20	7.43	7.19	7.43	
23	B	Jaroslav Dobrovodský	Slovakia	7.40	7.22	7.33	7.40	
24	A	Yeóryios Tsákonas	Greece	X	X	7.35	7.35	
25	B	Otto Kilpi	Finland	5.05	7.27	X	7.27	
26	A	Zacharias Arnos	Cyprus	7.02	7.16	7.20	7.20	
27	A	Adrian Vasile	Romania	7.19	–	–	7.19	
28	A	Alexandr Cuharenco	Moldova	7.06	7.13	7.04	7.13	
29	A	Admir Bregu	Albania	7.06	X	6.97	7.06	
30	B	Darius Aučyna	Lithuania	6.89	7.02	X	7.02	

=== Final ===
The final was held on March 5 at 16:25.

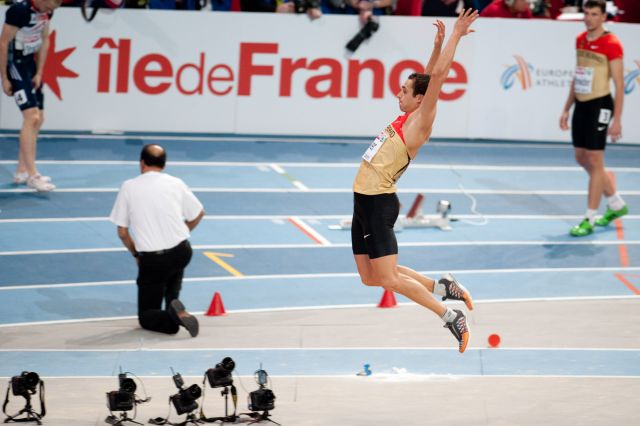
Sebastian Bayer won the gold for Germany.

Rank	Athlete	Nationality	#1	#2	#3	#4	#5	#6	Result	Note
1st place, gold medalist(s)	Sebastian Bayer	Germany	X	8.10	–	8.16	X	X	8.16	SB
2nd place, silver medalist(s)	Kafétien Gomis	France	8.02	X	7.93	X	8.03	8.00	8.03	SB
3rd place, bronze medalist(s)	Morten Jensen	Denmark	X	X	8.00	X	X	7.88	8.00	SB
4	Teddy Tamgho	France	X	7.78	X	7.83	7.94	7.98	7.98	
5	Povilas Mykolaitis	Lithuania	X	7.85	7.87	X	7.77	7.97	7.97	
6	Luis Méliz	Spain	X	7.78	7.66	7.90	7.85	7.64	7.90	
7	Michel Tornéus	Sweden	7.53	7.84	7.78	7.68	X	X	7.84	
8	Roman Novotný	Czech Republic	7.66	X	X	X	X	X	7.66	
