= Guillaume Victorin =

French long jumper

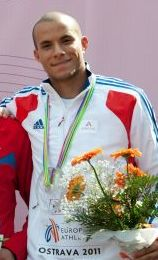
- Guillaume Victorin in 2011

Personal information
- Born: 26 May 1990 (age 36) Montpellier, France
- Height: 1.85 m (6 ft 1 in)
- Weight: 84 kg (185 lb)

Sport
- Sport: Athletics
- Event: Long jump
- Club: Club athlétique de Montreuil 93
- Coached by: Jocelyn Piat; Marisa De Aniceto

Guillaume Victorin (born 26 May 1990) is a French athlete specialising in the long jump. He won a bronze medal at the 2011 European U23 Championships. He also finished eighth at the 2018 European Championships.

His personal bests in the event are 8.00 metres outdoors (+1.7 m/s, Albi 2018) and 7.91 metres indoors (New York 2014).

== International competitions ==
Year	Competition	Venue	Position	Event	Notes
Representing France
2008	World Junior Championships	Bydgoszcz, Poland	21st (q)	Long jump	7.08 m
2009	European Junior Championships	Novi Sad, Serbia	15th (q)	Triple jump	7.30 m
2011	European U23 Championships	Ostrava, Czech Republic	3rd	Long jump	7.86 m
2018	European Championships	Berlin, Germany	8th	Long jump	7.84 m
