= Adrian Strzałkowski =

Polish track and field athlete (born 1990)

Medal record

Men's athletics

Representing Poland

Jeux de la Francophonie
Gold medal – first place	2013 Nice	Long jump

Adrian Strzałkowski (born 20 March 1990) is a Polish track and field athlete who competes in the long jump. His personal best of 8.18 m (26 ft 10 in) is the Polish indoor record for the event.

He represented Poland at the 2013 European Athletics Indoor Championships and the 2014 IAAF World Indoor Championships. He was the gold medallist at the 2013 Jeux de la Francophonie.

== Career ==
Born in Szczecin, he was raised in Stalowa Wola, joined up with a local athletics club there and began working with coach Kazimierz Luchowski. Initially he competed in the triple jump but soon focused on the long jump instead. He returned to his native Szczecin in 2009 and turned to Mieczyslaw Komorowski as a coach. It was during this period that he competed internationally for the first time. His debut for Poland came at the 2011 European Athletics U23 Championships, though he did not get past the qualifying round. He placed fourth at the Polish Athletics Championships that year and also set a personal best mark of 7.88 m (25 ft 10 in).

Strzałkowski began to study computer science in Łódź and struggled to find a new jumping coach. He eventually found one in Leszek Lipiński at nearby Aleksandrów Łódzki. He regarded this new arrangement as a breakthrough for his career as his performances began to improve. In 2012 he was runner-up at the Polish Indoor Championships and won the under-23 national title. At the start of 2013 he matched his personal best to win his first national title indoors and made his senior international debut at the 2013 European Athletics Indoor Championships, where he came tenth overall. A new best of 7.90 m (25 ft 11 in) in Anhalt-Dessau preceded his victory at the 2013 Polish Championships and a gold medal at the Jeux de la Francophonie – won in a wind-assisted 7.99 m (26 ft 2 1/2 in). He won his first indoor Polish title in 2014 with another improvement of 7.96 m (26 ft 1 1/4 in). This earned him a place on the team for the 2014 IAAF World Indoor Championships held in Sopot, Poland. He surprised with a big personal best in his first jump at the competition, clearing a Polish indoor record of 8.11 m (26 ft 7 1/4 in) to finish top of the qualifying round. He produced the joint second-best mark of his career in the final round and this placed him sixth.

== Personal bests ==
- Long jump outdoor – 7.90 m (25 ft 11 in) (2013)
- Long jump indoor – 8.18 m (26 ft 10 in) (2014) NR
- Triple jump outdoor – 13.97 m (45 ft 10 in) (2008)

== Competition record ==
Year	Competition	Venue	Position	Event	Notes
2011	European U23 Championships	Ostrava, Czech Republic	18th (q)	Long jump	7.26 m (w: +0.1 m/s)
2013	European Indoor Championships	Gothenburg, Sweden	10th (q)	Long jump	7.87 m
2013	Jeux de la Francophonie	Nice, France	1st	Long jump	7.99 m (w)
2014	World Indoor Championships	Sopot, Poland	6th	Long jump	7.96 m
2014	European Championships	Zürich, Switzerland	12th	Long jump	7.63 m
2015	European Indoor Championships	Prague, Czech Republic	12th (q)	Long jump	7.70 m
