= 2011 European Athletics U23 Championships – Men's long jump =

The Men's long jump event at the 2011 European Athletics U23 Championships was held in Ostrava, Czech Republic, at Městský stadion on 14 and 15 July.

== Medalists ==
Gold	Aleksandr Menkov; Russia
Silver	Marcos Chuva; Portugal
Bronze	Guillaume Victorin; France

== Results ==
=== Final ===
15 July 2011 / 18:20

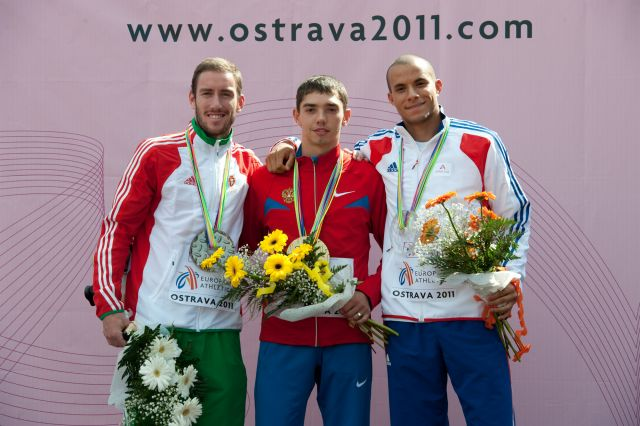
The podium (left to right): Marcos Chuva, Aleksandr Menkov, Guillaume Victorin

Rank	Name	Nationality	Attempts						Result	Notes
Rank	Name	Nationality	1	2	3	4	5	6	Result	Notes
1st place, gold medalist(s)	Aleksandr Menkov	Russia	7.36 (w: +0.2 m/s)	7.90 (w: +1.5 m/s)	7.96 (w: +0.7 m/s)	8.08 (w: +0.1 m/s)	x (w: +0.4 m/s)	x (w: 0.0 m/s)	8.08 (w: +0.1 m/s)	
2nd place, silver medalist(s)	Marcos Chuva	Portugal	7.60 (w: +1.2 m/s)	7.94 (w: +0.6 m/s)	x (w: +1.7 m/s)	7.53 (w: +0.2 m/s)	7.66 (w: +0.7 m/s)	7.67 (w: +0.3 m/s)	7.94 (w: +0.6 m/s)	
3rd place, bronze medalist(s)	Guillaume Victorin	France	x (w: +1.8 m/s)	7.86 (w: +1.0 m/s)	x (w: +0.6 m/s)	7.45 (w: +0.8 m/s)	7.59 (w: +0.8 m/s)	6.96 (w: m/s)	7.86 (w: +1.0 m/s)	PB
4	Darius Aučyna	Lithuania	7.77 (w: +1.7 m/s)	7.81 (w: +1.0 m/s)	7.80 (w: +1.6 m/s)	7.25 (w: +0.6 m/s)	x (w: +0.1 m/s)	x (w: +0.4 m/s)	7.81 (w: +1.0 m/s)	
5	Elvijs Misāns	Latvia	x (w: +0.8 m/s)	x (w: +0.2 m/s)	7.62 (w: +0.1 m/s)	7.72 (w: +0.4 m/s)	x (w: +0.6 m/s)	7.69 (w: m/s)	7.72 (w: +0.4 m/s)	
6	Roni Ollikainen	Finland	7.62 (w: +0.9 m/s)	7.60 (w: 0.0 m/s)	7.23 (w: +0.4 m/s)	7.71 (w: +0.6 m/s)	7.58 (w: +0.4 m/s)	7.52 (w: -0.1 m/s)	7.71 (w: +0.6 m/s)	
7	Alyn Camara	Germany	x (w: +0.6 m/s)	x (w: +0.5 m/s)	7.71 (w: +0.6 m/s)	5.06 (w: +0.3 m/s)	4.26 (w: +0.2 m/s)	x (w: 0.0 m/s)	7.71 (w: +0.6 m/s)	
8	Eusebio Cáceres	Spain	x (w: +0.3 m/s)	7.64 (w: +1.1 m/s)	x (w: +0.1 m/s)	x (w: 0.0 m/s)	x (w: +0.5 m/s)	x (w: +0.2 m/s)	7.64 (w: +1.1 m/s)	
9	Olivier Huet	France	7.55 (w: +0.2 m/s)	x (w: +1.2 m/s)	7.57 (w: +0.2 m/s)				7.57 (w: +0.2 m/s)	
10	Nicolas Stempnick	Belgium	7.54 (w: +0.6 m/s)	x (w: +1.2 m/s)	7.49 (w: +0.2 m/s)				7.54 (w: +0.6 m/s)	
11	Konrad Podgórski	Poland	x (w: +1.1 m/s)	7.47 (w: +0.8 m/s)	x (w: +0.2 m/s)				7.47 (w: +0.8 m/s)	
12	Marius Vadeikis	Lithuania	7.43 (w: +1.4 m/s)	x (w: +0.4 m/s)	7.44 (w: +0.9 m/s)				7.44 (w: +0.9 m/s)	

=== Qualifications ===
Qualified: qualifying perf. 7.85 (Q) or 12 best performers (q) to the advance to the Final

==== Summary ====
Rank	Name	Nationality	Result	Notes
1	Elvijs Misāns	Latvia	7.81	q PB
2	Roni Ollikainen	Finland	7.76	q SB
3	Nicolas Stempnick	Belgium	7.71	q
4	Aleksandr Menkov	Russia	7.69	q
5	Olivier Huet	France	7.65	q
6	Darius Aučyna	Lithuania	7.64	q
7	Eusebio Cáceres	Spain	7.64	q
8	Marcos Chuva	Portugal	7.57	q
9	Alyn Camara	Germany	7.52	q
10	Guillaume Victorin	France	7.51	q
11	Konrad Podgórski	Poland	7.51	q
12	Marius Vadeikis	Lithuania	7.47	q
13	Denis Bogdanov	Russia	7.45	
14	Bence Bánhidi	Hungary	7.43	
15	Mario Kral	Germany	7.35	
16	Dániel Ecseki	Hungary	7.28	
17	Adam McMullen	Ireland	7.27	
18	Adrian Strzałkowski	Poland	7.26	
19	Grégory Bianchi	Italy	7.24	
20	Jonas Mögenburg	Norway	7.20	
21	Julian Howard	Germany	7.13	
22	Ivan Lihachov	Ukraine	7.02	
23	Gadi Okhayon	Israel	6.80	
24	Dzmitry Astrouski	Belarus	6.78	
25	Petros Poupas	Cyprus	6.67	
26	Dino Pervan	Croatia	4.68	
	Adam Pašiak	Czech Republic	DNS	

==== Details ====
===== Group A =====
14 July 2011 / 16:15

Rank	Name	Nationality	Attempts			Result	Notes
Rank	Name	Nationality	1	2	3	Result	Notes
1	Elvijs Misāns	Latvia	7.53 (w: +0.1 m/s)	7.59 (w: 0.0 m/s)	7.81 (w: -0.2 m/s)	7.81 (w: -0.2 m/s)	q PB
2	Aleksandr Menkov	Russia	x (w: +0.2 m/s)	7.69 (w: +0.7 m/s)	-	7.69 (w: +0.7 m/s)	q
3	Olivier Huet	France	7.52 (w: -0.1 m/s)	7.65 (w: -0.1 m/s)	x (w: +0.4 m/s)	7.65 (w: -0.1 m/s)	q
4	Marcos Chuva	Portugal	7.16 (w: -0.5 m/s)	7.26 (w: -0.8 m/s)	7.57 (w: -0.2 m/s)	7.57 (w: -0.2 m/s)	q
5	Konrad Podgórski	Poland	x (w: -0.2 m/s)	7.51 (w: +0.3 m/s)	x (w: -0.4 m/s)	7.51 (w: +0.3 m/s)	q
6	Marius Vadeikis	Lithuania	7.12 (w: +0.3 m/s)	7.42 (w: -0.1 m/s)	7.47 (w: +0.7 m/s)	7.47 (w: +0.7 m/s)	q
7	Dániel Ecseki	Hungary	7.19 (w: +0.6 m/s)	x (w: -0.2 m/s)	7.28 (w: -0.1 m/s)	7.28 (w: -0.1 m/s)	
8	Adam McMullen	Ireland	7.27 (w: -0.5 m/s)	6.84 (w: -0.7 m/s)	5.54 (w: -0.3 m/s)	7.27 (w: -0.5 m/s)	
9	Adrian Strzałkowski	Poland	7.26 (w: +0.1 m/s)	x (w: +0.1 m/s)	-	7.26 (w: +0.1 m/s)	
10	Julian Howard	Germany	x (w: -0.1 m/s)	x (w: -0.4 m/s)	7.13 (w: -0.4 m/s)	7.13 (w: -0.4 m/s)	
11	Ivan Lihachov	Ukraine	6.89 (w: -0.3 m/s)	7.02 (w: -0.1 m/s)	x (w: +0.6 m/s)	7.02 (w: -0.1 m/s)	
12	Dzmitry Astrouski	Belarus	x (w: +0.6 m/s)	x (w: 0.0 m/s)	6.78 (w: -0.4 m/s)	6.78 (w: -0.4 m/s)	
13	Dino Pervan	Croatia	x (w: +0.5 m/s)	x (w: +0.3 m/s)	4.68 (w: -0.3 m/s)	4.68 (w: -0.3 m/s)	

===== Group B =====
14 July 2011 / 16:15

Rank	Name	Nationality	Attempts			Result	Notes
Rank	Name	Nationality	1	2	3	Result	Notes
1	Roni Ollikainen	Finland	7.76 (w: +0.4 m/s)	7.73 (w: +0.2 m/s)	-	7.76 (w: +0.4 m/s)	q SB
2	Nicolas Stempnick	Belgium	7.46 (w: -0.2 m/s)	7.71 (w: +0.2 m/s)	7.24 (w: +0.3 m/s)	7.71 (w: +0.2 m/s)	q
3	Darius Aučyna	Lithuania	7.54 (w: +0.4 m/s)	7.47 (w: +0.4 m/s)	7.64 (w: 0.0 m/s)	7.64 (w: 0.0 m/s)	q
4	Eusebio Cáceres	Spain	7.64 (w: +0.1 m/s)	7.46 (w: -0.4 m/s)	x (w: -0.6 m/s)	7.64 (w: +0.1 m/s)	q
5	Alyn Camara	Germany	x (w: +0.4 m/s)	7.52 (w: +0.3 m/s)	7.44 (w: +0.3 m/s)	7.52 (w: +0.3 m/s)	q
6	Guillaume Victorin	France	6.93 (w: 0.0 m/s)	7.45 (w: -0.4 m/s)	7.51 (w: +0.2 m/s)	7.51 (w: +0.2 m/s)	q
7	Denis Bogdanov	Russia	x (w: +0.6 m/s)	7.45 (w: -0.4 m/s)	x (w: +0.1 m/s)	7.45 (w: -0.4 m/s)	
8	Bence Bánhidi	Hungary	7.25 (w: -0.1 m/s)	7.31 (w: -0.1 m/s)	7.43 (w: -0.1 m/s)	7.43 (w: -0.1 m/s)	
9	Mario Kral	Germany	7.28 (w: +0.1 m/s)	7.35 (w: -0.1 m/s)	7.35 (w: +0.2 m/s)	7.35 (w: -0.1 m/s)	
10	Grégory Bianchi	Italy	x (w: +0.6 m/s)	x (w: -0.3 m/s)	7.24 (w: 0.0 m/s)	7.24 (w: 0.0 m/s)	
11	Jonas Mögenburg	Norway	6.85 (w: +0.1 m/s)	7.17 (w: +0.6 m/s)	7.20 (w: +0.2 m/s)	7.20 (w: +0.2 m/s)	
12	Gadi Okhayon	Israel	6.80 (w: -0.2 m/s)	5.15 (w: -0.4 m/s)	6.78 (w: -0.4 m/s)	6.80 (w: -0.2 m/s)	
13	Petros Poupas	Cyprus	6.67 (w: -0.2 m/s)	x (w: -0.1 m/s)	x (w: +0.1 m/s)	6.67 (w: -0.2 m/s)	
	Adam Pašiak	Czech Republic				DNS	

== Participation ==
According to an unofficial count, 26 athletes from 19 countries participated in the event.

- Belarus (1)
- Belgium (1)
- Croatia (1)
- Cyprus (1)
- Finland (1)
- France (2)
- Germany (3)
- Hungary (2)
- Ireland (1)
- Israel (1)
- Italy (1)
- Latvia (1)
- Lithuania (2)
- Norway (1)
- Poland (2)
- Portugal (1)
- Russia (2)
- Spain (1)
- Ukraine (1)
