= 2015 European Athletics Indoor Championships – Men's long jump =

The men's long jump event at the 2015 European Athletics Indoor Championships was held on 5 March 2015 at 17:00 (qualification) and 6 March, 17:55 (final) local time.

== Medalists ==
Gold	Silver	Bronze
Michel Tornéus; Sweden	Radek Juška; Czech Republic	Andreas Otterling; Sweden

== Records ==
Standing records prior to the 2013 European Athletics Indoor Championships
World record	Carl Lewis (USA)	8.79	New York City, United States	27 January 1984
European record	Sebastian Bayer (GER)	8.71	Turin, Italy	8 March 2009
Championship record	Sebastian Bayer (GER)	8.71	Turin, Italy	8 March 2009
World Leading	Kafétien Gomis (FRA)	8.18	Aubière, France	22 February 2015
European Leading	Kafétien Gomis (FRA)			

== Results ==
=== Qualification ===
Qualification: Qualification Performance 8.00 (Q) or at least 8 best performers advanced to the final.

Rank	Athlete	Nationality	#1	#2	#3	Result	Note
1	Michel Tornéus	Sweden	7.97	–	–	7.97	q
2	Andreas Otterling	Sweden	x	7.62	7.96	7.96	q, PB
3	Pavel Shalin	Russia	x	7.94	–	7.94	q
4	Louis Tsatoumas	Greece	7.62	7.90	–	7.90	q
5	Jean Marie Okutu	Spain	7.44	7.77	7.86	7.86	q
6	Rain Kask	Estonia	7.82	x	–	7.82	q, PB
7	Alyn Camara	Germany	7.79	x	7.79	7.79	q
8	Radek Juška	Czech Republic	7.79	7.30	7.59	7.79	q
9	Cedric Nolf	Belgium	7.78	x	x	7.78	
10	Kanstantsin Barycheuski	Belarus	x	7.74	7.77	7.77	
11	Max Heß	Germany	7.71	7.66	5.22	7.71	
12	Adrian Strzałkowski	Poland	7.70	7.46	7.47	7.70	
13	Julian Howard	Germany	7.65	6.40	7.64	7.65	
14	Kafétien Gomis	France	x	x	7.65	7.65	
15	Bachana Khorava	Georgia	7.63	7.45	6.77	7.63	
16	Benjamin Gabrielsen	Denmark	7.49	7.62	7.47	7.62	
17	Adam McMullen	Ireland	7.50	7.19	7.53	7.53	
18	Valentin Toboc	Romania	x	x	7.49	7.49	
19	Sergiu Caciuriac	Romania	7.03	7.17	7.47	7.47	
20	Georgi Tsonov	Bulgaria	7.40	x	–	7.40	
21	Thobias Nilsson Montler	Sweden	5.71	7.32	7.38	7.38	
22	Tomáš Veszelka	Slovakia	x	7.24	x	7.24	
23	Gledis Halluni	Albania	x	x	6.42	6.42	
—N/a	Elvijs Misāns	Latvia	x	x	x	NM	

=== Final ===
Rank	Athlete	Nationality	#1	#2	#3	#4	#5	#6	Result	Note
1st place, gold medalist(s)	Michel Tornéus	Sweden	x	8.30	8.03	–	–	–	8.30	WL, NR
2nd place, silver medalist(s)	Radek Juška	Czech Republic	8.10	x	7.49	x	x	7.89	8.10	PB
3rd place, bronze medalist(s)	Andreas Otterling	Sweden	7.70	x	x	7.87	7.97	8.06	8.06	PB
4	Louis Tsatoumas	Greece	7.72	7.90	7.95	x	7.98	7.71	7.98	
5	Jean Marie Okutu	Spain	7.85	x	7.93	x	x	6.07	7.93	
6	Pavel Shalin	Russia	7.74	x	x	7.80	x	x	7.80	
7	Alyn Camara	Germany	7.51	7.57	x	7.40	x	7.70	7.70	
8	Rain Kask	Estonia	x	x	x	7.24	x	–	7.24	
