= Stefan Brits =

South African track and field athlete

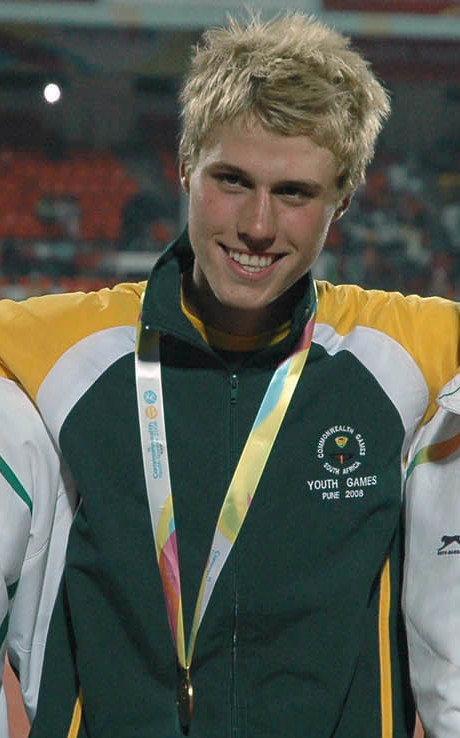
- Brits at the 2008 Commonwealth Youth Games

Personal information
- Nationality: South African
- Born: January 19, 1992 (age 34) Cape Town, South Africa
- Height: 1.83 m (6 ft 0 in)
- Weight: 72 kg (159 lb)

Sport
- Sport: Track and field
- Event: Long jump
- College team: Florida State University

Achievements and titles
- Personal best: Long jump: 8.22 m (2016)

Stefan Brits (born 19 January 1992) is a South African track and field athlete who competes in the long jump. Brits represented his country at the 2016 Summer Olympics. He holds a personal best of 8.22 m (26 ft 11 1/2 in), set in 2016.

== Career ==
Born in Cape Town, he attended Paul Roos Gymnasium. Brits competed in the long jump from a young age and was twice a participant at both the World Youth Championships in Athletics (2007, 2009) and the World Junior Championships in Athletics (2008, 2010). He was a silver medallist in the long jump at the 2009 World Youth Championships in Athletics and took gold at the 2008 Commonwealth Youth Games.

Brits enrolled at Florida State University as a chemistry doctoral student and was unusual as a post-graduate in that he also competed as a student-athlete for the Florida State Seminoles track team. In his first major college meet, he was runner-up at the 2012 Atlantic Coast Conference (ACC) indoor championship and was 20th at the NCAA Men's Division I Outdoor Track and Field Championships later that year. He set a meet record of 8.05 m (26 ft 4 3/4 in) in winning the 2013 ACC Outdoor title and was a three-time NCAA All-American, coming sixth at the NCAA Men's Division I Indoor Track and Field Championships and placing in the long jump and 4 × 100 metres relay at the 2013 NCAA Outdoor Championships.

He missed much of 2014 and 2015 due to an injury but returned to ACC and NCAA competition in mid-2015. In his final year of eligibility he ACC Indoor runner-up, won the ACC Outdoor title with a best of 8.22 m (26 ft 11 1/2 in) and was third at the NCAA Indoor Championships. He qualified for the NCAA Outdoor Championships, but did not compete due to an injury. Brits performed well academically during his college athletic career and was a four-time Academic All-American. This culminated with him being named the 2016 Academic All-American of the Year by the College Sports Information Directors of America, making him the second Florida State athlete ever to receive that honour, after shot putter and Rhodes Scholar Garrett Johnson.

His jump of 8.22 m earned him selection for South Africa at the 2016 Summer Olympics, where he competed in the qualifying round only.

== Personal bests ==
- 100 metres – 10.88w (2010)
- 200 metres – 21.31 (2008)
- Long jump – 8.22 m (2016)

- Indoor – 7.82 m (2016)

== International competitions ==
Year	Competition	Venue	Position	Event	Notes
2007	World Youth Championships	Ostrava, Czech Republic	7th (q)	Long jump	7.02 m
2008	World Junior Championships	Bydgoszcz, Poland	6th	Long jump	7.42 m
2008	Commonwealth Youth Games	Pune, India	1st	Long jump	7.38 m
2009	World Youth Championships	Brixen, Italy	2nd	Long jump	7.57 m
2010	World Junior Championships	Moncton, Canada	13th (q)	Long jump	7.18 m
2016	Olympic Games	Rio de Janeiro, Brazil	10th (q)	Long jump	7.71 m
