= Jānis Leitis =

Latvian athlete

Personal information
- Born: April 13, 1989 (age 37)
- Height: 1.9 m (6 ft 3 in)
- Weight: 75 kg (165 lb)

Sport
- Country: Latvia
- Sport: Athletics
- Events: 400m and long jump

Jānis Leitis (born 13 April 1989 in Riga) is a Latvian athlete who usually competes in 400m and long jump.

Leitis is the 2009 European U23 champion in long jump. He is the national record holder in the 400 m (45.53, 2018).

Leitis competed for the Nebraska Cornhuskers track and field team in the NCAA.

== Achievements ==
Year	Tournament	Venue	Result	Discipline	Details
Representing Latvia
2008	World Junior Championships	Bydgoszcz, Poland	14th	400 m	47.51 s
2008	Latvian Championships	Valmiera, Latvia	2nd	200 m	21.90 s
2009	European U23 Championships	Kaunas, Lithuania	1st	Long jump	7.90 m (wind: 0.2 m/s)
2009	Latvian Championships	Ventspils, Latvia	1st	200 m	21.57 s
2009	Latvian Championships	Ventspils, Latvia	1st	Long jump	7.58 m
2010	Latvian Championships	Jēkabpils, Latvia	1st	Long jump	7.43 m
2010	European Championships	Barcelona, Spain	20th	Long jump	7.87 m
2011	European U23 Championships	Ostrava, Czech Republic	7th	4 × 400 m relay	3:08.42
2012	European Championships	Helsinki, Finland	9th	400 m	45.88 s
2012	European Championships	Helsinki, Finland	32nd	Long jump	5.88 m
2012	European Championships	Helsinki, Finland	12th	4 × 100 m relay	40.46 s
2012	Summer Olympics	London, Great Britain	35th	400 m	46.41 s
2018	European Championships	Berlin, Germany	14th	400 m	45.53 s
2019	European Indoor Championships	Glasgow, United Kingdom	9th (sf)	400 m	47.36 s

== Personal bests ==
Event	Record	Venue	Year
100 metres	10.71 s	Riga, Latvia	2011
200 metres	21.13 s	Valmiera, Latvia	2017
400 metres	45.53 s	Berlin, Germany	2018
Long jump	7.98 m	Liepāja, Latvia	2011
Triple jump	16.12 m	Lincoln, US (indoor)	2013
