= 2009 European Athletics U23 Championships – Men's long jump =

The men's long jump event at the 2009 European Athletics U23 Championships was held in Kaunas, Lithuania, at S. Dariaus ir S. Girėno stadionas (Darius and Girėnas Stadium) on 16 and 17 July.

== Medalists ==
Gold	Jānis Leitis; Latvia
Silver	Pavel Karavayev; Russia
Bronze	Mikko Kivinen; Finland

== Results ==
=== Final ===
17 July

Rank	Name	Nationality	Attempts						Result	Notes
Rank	Name	Nationality	1	2	3	4	5	6	Result	Notes
1st place, gold medalist(s)	Jānis Leitis	Latvia	7.46 (w: -0.8 m/s)	7.69 (w: 0.2 m/s)	7.67 (w: -0.1 m/s)	x	7.75 (w: 0.1 m/s)	7.90 (w: 0.2 m/s)	7.90 (w: 0.2 m/s)	
2nd place, silver medalist(s)	Pavel Karavayev	Russia	x	x	7.81 (w: 0.3 m/s)	x	7.86 (w: 0.0 m/s)	x	7.86 (w: 0.0 m/s)	
3rd place, bronze medalist(s)	Mikko Kivinen	Finland	7.62 (w: 0.2 m/s)	7.47 (w: -0.8 m/s)	7.62 (w: -0.3 m/s)	7.74 (w: 0.5 m/s)	x	7.85 (w: -0.1 m/s)	7.85 (w: -0.1 m/s)	
4	Dániel Ecseki	Hungary	7.55 (w: 0.2 m/s)	7.80 (w: 0.0 m/s)	7.65 (w: -0.2 m/s)	7.72 (w: -0.2 m/s)	7.78 (w: 0.0 m/s)	x	7.80 (w: 0.0 m/s)	
5	Mario Kral	Germany	7.79 (w: 0.3 m/s)	7.67 (w: -0.6 m/s)	x	x	x	7.66 (w: 0.2 m/s)	7.79 (w: 0.3 m/s)	
6	Sergey Slepukhin	Russia	7.60 (w: 0.7 m/s)	7.62 (w: 0.4 m/s)	7.79 (w: -0.2 m/s)	7.47 (w: 0.7 m/s)	7.55 (w: -0.2 m/s)	7.48 (w: 0.2 m/s)	7.79 (w: -0.2 m/s)	
7	Jean Marie Okutu	Spain	7.53 (w: 0.3 m/s)	7.65 (w: 0.2 m/s)	7.78 (w: 0.0 m/s)	x	7.70 (w: 0.0 m/s)	7.76 (w: 0.2 m/s)	7.78 (w: 0.0 m/s)	
8	Marcos Chuva	Portugal	7.29 (w: -0.6 m/s)	6.41 (w: -0.6 m/s)	7.67 (w: -0.1 m/s)	7.51 (w: 0.2 m/s)	7.62 (w: 0.1 m/s)	5.25 (w: +0.2 m/s)	7.67 (w: -0.1 m/s)	
9	Dzmitry Astrouski	Belarus	7.61 (w: 0.4 m/s)	7.43 (w: 0.0 m/s)	6.84 (w: -0.3 m/s)				7.61 (w: 0.4 m/s)	
10	Emmanuel Biron	France	7.54 (w: -0.5 m/s)	x	7.54 (w: 0.3 m/s)				7.54 (w: -0.5 m/s)	
11	Darius Aučyna	Lithuania	7.39 (w: 0.3 m/s)	x	x				7.39 (w: 0.3 m/s)	
	Mihail Mertzanidis-Despoteris	Greece	x	x	x				NM	

=== Qualifications ===
16 July
Qualifying 7.65 or 12 best to the Final

==== Group A ====
Rank	Name	Nationality	Result	Notes
1	Emmanuel Biron	France	7.73 (w: 1.1 m/s)	Q
2	Mihail Mertzanidis-Despoteris	Greece	7.71 (w: 1.7 m/s)	Q
3	Sergey Slepukhin	Russia	7.70 w (w: 2.3 m/s)	Q
4	Dzmitry Astrouski	Belarus	7.69 (w: 0.8 m/s)	Q
5	Otto Kilpi	Finland	7.64 (w: -1.2 m/s)	
6	Marcos Caldeira	Portugal	7.63 (w: 1.0 m/s)	
7	Timo Kirchenberger	Germany	7.53 w (w: 2.4 m/s)	
8	Tomasz Dula	Poland	7.50 (w: 1.7 m/s)	
9	Marko Prugovečki	Croatia	7.43 (w: 0.9 m/s)	
10	Sergey Mikhailovskiy	Russia	7.23 (w: 2.0 m/s)	

==== Group B ====
Rank	Name	Nationality	Result	Notes
1	Pavel Karavayev	Russia	7.97 (w: 1.3 m/s)	Q
2	Mario Kral	Germany	7.80 (w: 1.7 m/s)	Q
3	Darius Aučyna	Lithuania	7.78 (w: 1.9 m/s)	Q
4	Dániel Ecseki	Hungary	7.76 (w: 1.2 m/s)	Q
5	Marcos Chuva	Portugal	7.76 (w: 1.2 m/s)	Q
6	Mikko Kivinen	Finland	7.75 (w: 1.3 m/s)	Q
7	Jean Marie Okutu	Spain	7.68 (w: 0.8 m/s)	Q
8	Jānis Leitis	Latvia	7.67 (w: 0.7 m/s)	Q
9	Benoît Maxwell	France	7.43 (w: 1.7 m/s)	
10	Łukasz Mateusiak	Poland	7.31 (w: 0.8 m/s)	
11	Mattheos Volou	Cyprus	7.13 (w: -2.0 m/s)	

== Participation ==
According to an unofficial count, 21 athletes from 14 countries participated in the event.

- Belarus (1)
- Croatia (1)
- Cyprus (1)
- Finland (2)
- France (2)
- Germany (2)
- Greece (1)
- Hungary (1)
- Latvia (1)
- Lithuania (1)
- Poland (2)
- Portugal (2)
- Russia (3)
- Spain (1)
