= Alyn Camara =

German long jumper (born 1989)

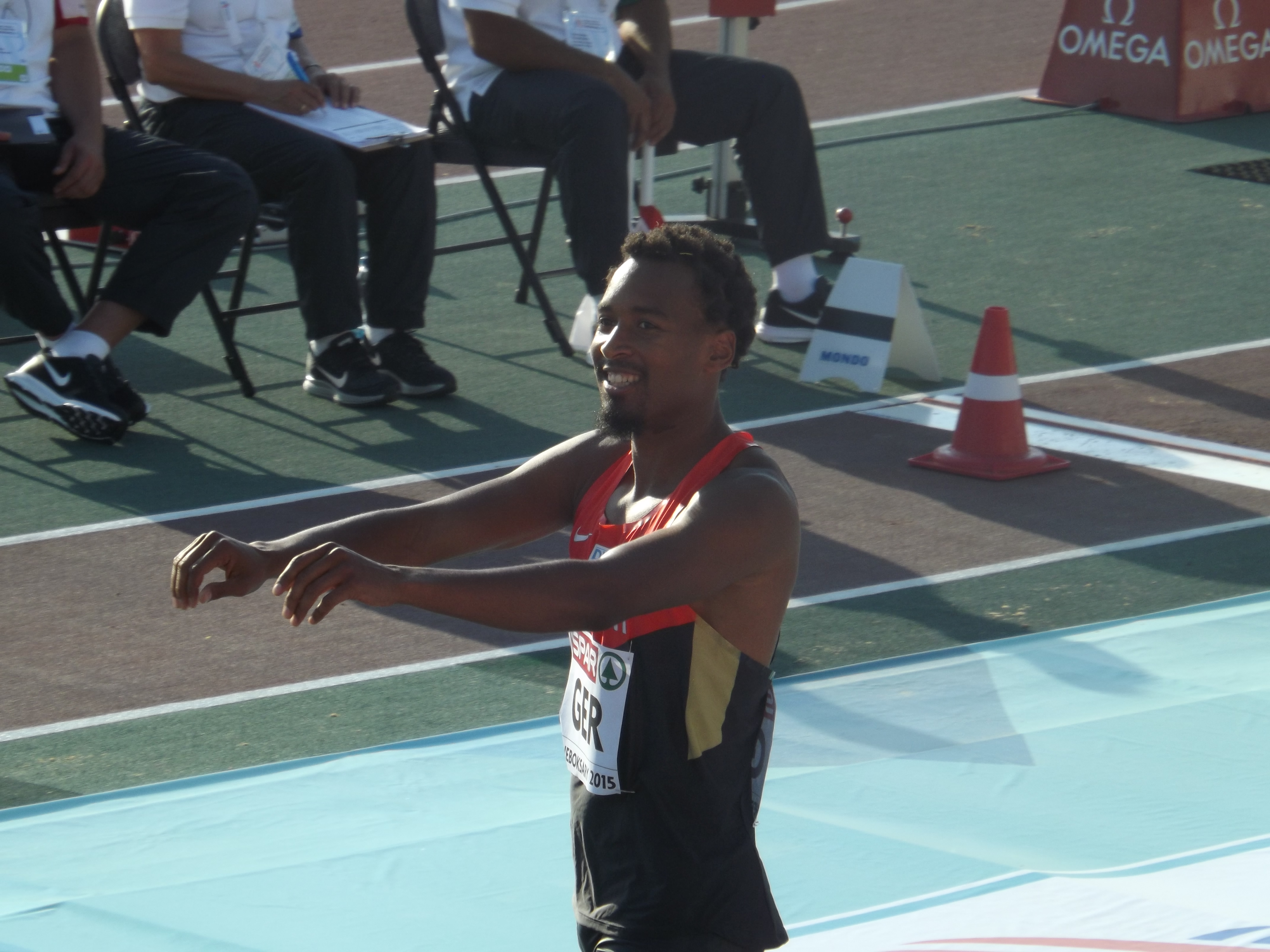
- Camara at the 2015 European Team Championships

Personal information
- Born: 31 March 1989 (age 37) Bergisch Gladbach, West Germany
- Height: 196 cm (6 ft 5 in)
- Weight: 84 kg (185 lb)

Sport
- Country: Germany
- Sport: Athletics
- Event: Long jump
- Club: ASV Köln

Achievements and titles
- Personal best: 8.29 m

Alyn Camara (born 31 March 1989 in Bergisch Gladbach) is a German long jumper of Senegalese descent. He competed at the 2012 Summer Olympics in London and the 2016 Summer Olympics in Rio, but failed to qualify for the final.

== Competition record ==
Year	Competition	Venue	Position	Event	Notes
Representing Germany
2008	World Junior Championships	Bydgoszcz, Poland	36th (h)	110m hurdles (99.0 cm)	14.37 s (wind: -1.4 m/s)
2011	European U23 Championships	Ostrava, Czech Republic	7th	Long jump	7.71 m (wind: +0.6 m/s)
2012	European Championships	Helsinki, Finland	17th (q)	Long jump	7.80 m
2012	Olympic Games	London, United Kingdom	22nd (q)	Long jump	7.72 m
2013	World Championships	Moscow, Russia	18th (q)	Long jump	7.77 m
2015	European Indoor Championships	Prague, Czech Republic	7th	Long jump	7.70 m
2015	World Championships	Beijing, China	24th (q)	Long jump	7.66 m
2016	Olympic Games	Rio de Janeiro, Brazil	30th (q)	Long jump	5.16 m
