= Marcos Chuva =

Portuguese long jumper (born 1989)

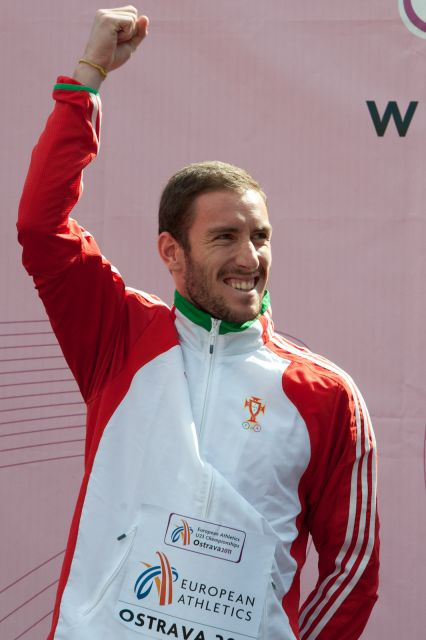

Personal information
- Born: August 8, 1989 (age 36) Oeiras, Portugal
- Height: 1.82 m (5 ft 11 1/2 in)
- Weight: 75 kg (165 lb)

Sport
- Country: Portugal
- Sport: Athletics
- Event: Long jump
- College team: Universidade Nova de Lisboa
- Updated on 15 August 2012

Marcos António Quintino Chuva (born 8 August 1989) is a Portuguese long jumper who competed for Portugal at the 2012 Summer Olympics in London. He was born in Oeiras.

== Competition record ==
Year	Competition	Venue	Position	Event	Notes
Representing Portugal
2008	World Junior Championships	Bydgoszcz, Poland	17th (sf)	110m hurdles (99 cm)	13.99 s (-1.0 m/s)
2008	World Junior Championships	Bydgoszcz, Poland	12th	Long jump	6.73 m (-0.5 m/s)
2009	Lusophony Games	Lisbon, Portugal	1st	Long jump	8.09 m (w)
2009	European U23 Championships	Kaunas, Lithuania	8th	4 × 100 m relay	40.36 s
2009	European U23 Championships	Kaunas, Lithuania	8th	Long jump	7.67 m (-0.1 m/s)
2010	Ibero-American Championships	San Fernando, Spain	5th	Long jump	7.58 m
2011	European Indoor Championships	Paris, France	17th (q)	Long jump	7.65 m
2011	European U23 Championships	Ostrava, Czech Republic	2nd	Long jump	7.94 m (+0.6 m/s)
2011	World Championships	Daegu, South Korea	10th	Long jump	8.05 m
2012	European Championships	Helsinki, Finland	7th	Long jump	7.92 m
2012	Olympic Games	London, United Kingdom	28th (q)	Long jump	7.55 m
2013	Universiade	Kazan, Russia	3rd	Long jump	8.15 m
2013	World Championships	Moscow, Russia	16th (q)	Long jump	7.82 m
2016	Ibero-American Championships	Rio de Janeiro, Brazil	4th	Long jump	7.64 m
2017	European Indoor Championships	Belgrade, Serbia	–	Long jump	NM
