= Jean Marie Okutu =

Spanish long jumper (born 1988)

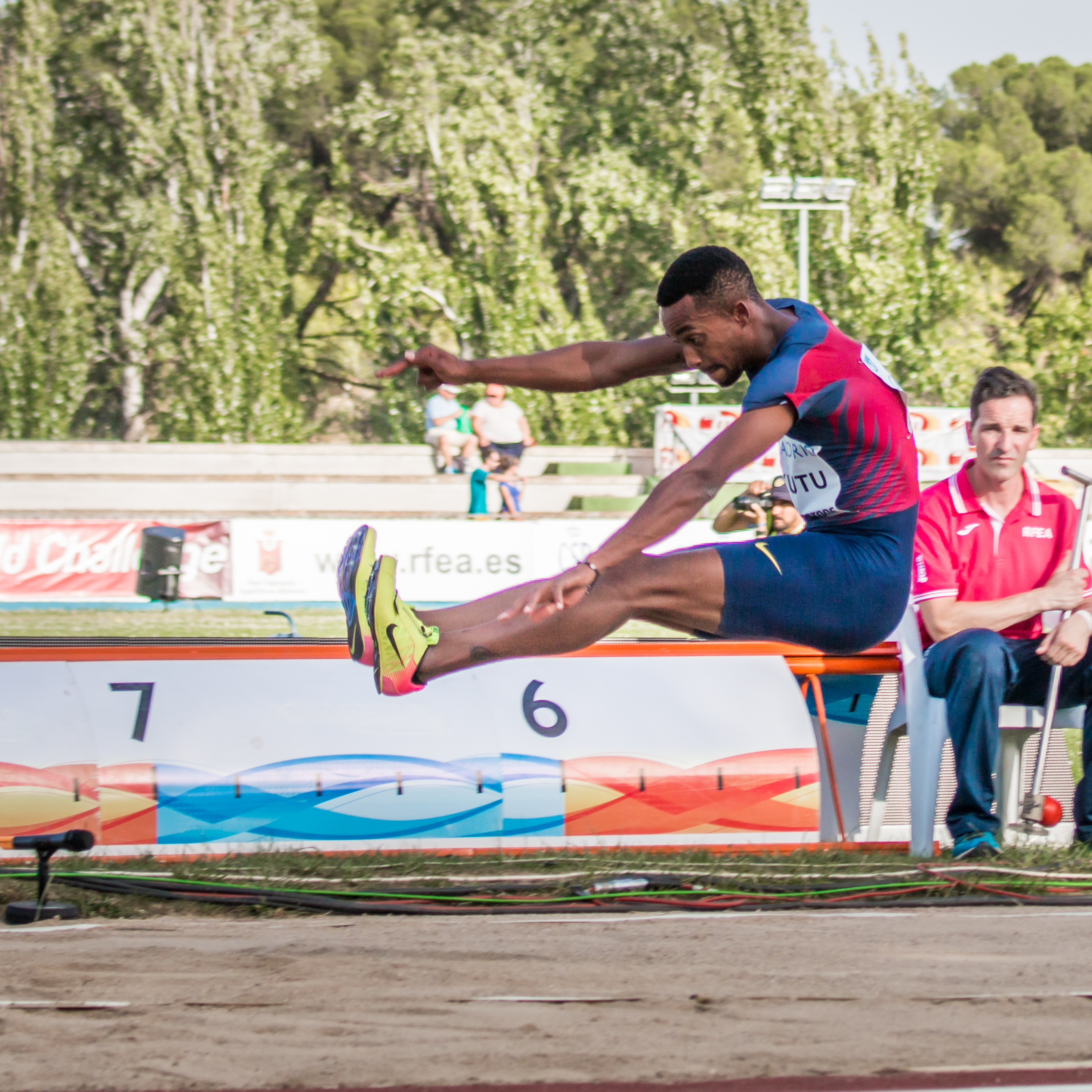
- Jean Marie Okutu jumping during the IAAF World Challenge Meeting Madrid 2017.

Personal information
- Nationality: Spanish
- Born: 4 August 1988 (age 37) Cotonou, Benin
- Height: 1.79 m (5 ft 10 in)
- Weight: 70 kg (150 lb)

Sport
- Sport: Track and field
- Event: Long jump
- Club: SG Pontevedra, FC Barcelona
- Coached by: Javier Medrano

Jean Marie Okutu Kouletio (born 4 August 1988) is an athlete specialising in the long jump. Born to Ghanaian parents in Benin, he represents Spain internationally. He made the final at the 2015 European Indoor Championships, finishing fifth. In addition he won the silver medal at the 2012 Ibero-American Championships.

Although Okutu was born in Benin, his family comes from Ghana; his father, a sailor was working in a port in Cotonou. At the age of six, Jean Marie moved with his family to Marín, Spain.

His personal bests in the event are 8.01 metres outdoors (+1.7 m/s; Pontevedra 2014) and 7.96 metres indoors (Antequera 2015).

== Competition record ==
Year	Competition	Venue	Position	Event	Notes
Representing Spain
2009	European U23 Championships	Kaunas, Lithuania	7th	Long jump	7.78 m
2012	Ibero-American Championships	Barquisimeto, Venezuela	2nd	Long jump	7.87 m
2013	European Indoor Championships	Gothenburg, Sweden	14th (q)	Long jump	7.65 m
2014	European Championships	Zürich, Switzerland	20th (q)	Long jump	7.64 m
2015	European Indoor Championships	Prague, Czech Republic	5th	Long jump	7.93 m
2016	Ibero-American Championships	Rio de Janeiro, Brazil	2nd	Long jump	7.84 m
2016	European Championships	Amsterdam, Netherlands	13th (q)	Long jump	7.80 m
2016	Olympic Games	Rio de Janeiro, Brazil	20th (q)	Long jump	7.75 m
2018	Mediterranean Games	Tarragona, Spain	6th	Long jump	7.78 m
2018	European Championships	Berlin, Germany	17th (q)	Long jump	7.66 m
2018	Ibero-American Championships	Trujillo, Peru	4th	Long jump	7.75 m
