= 2013 European Athletics Indoor Championships – Men's long jump =

The Men's long jump event at the 2013 European Athletics Indoor Championships was held at March 2, 2013 at 11:00 & 12:30 (qualification) and March 3, 17:00 (final) local time.

== Records ==
Standing records prior to the 2013 European Athletics Indoor Championships
World record	Carl Lewis (USA)	8.79	New York City, United States	27 January 1984
European record	Sebastian Bayer (GER)	8.71	Turin, Italy	8 March 2009
Championship record	Sebastian Bayer (GER)	8.71	Turin, Italy	8 March 2009
World Leading	Marquis Dendy (USA)	8.25	Fayetteville, United States	23 February 2013
European Leading	Aleksandr Menkov (RUS)	8.22	Irkutsk, Russia	25 January 2013

== Results ==
=== Qualification ===
Qualification: Qualification Performance 8.05 (Q) or at least 8 best performers advanced to the final.

Rank	Group	Athlete	Nationality	#1	#2	#3	Result	Notes
1	A	Aleksandr Menkov	Russia	7.72	7.98	8.22	8.22	Q, =EL
2	B	Christian Reif	Germany	x	8.15		8.15	Q, PB
3	B	Michel Tornéus	Sweden	8.07			8.07	Q
4	A	Louis Tsatoumas	Greece	8.01	7.94	x	8.01	q
5	B	Chris Tomlinson	Great Britain	7.73	7.80	7.98	7.98	q, SB
6	A	Eero Haapala	Finland	7.75	7.76	7.95	7.95	q
7	B	Tommi Evilä	Finland	7.75	7.95	—	7.95	q, SB
8	A	Elvijs Misāns	Latvia	7.48	7.77	7.92	7.92	q, SB
9	A	Sebastian Bayer	Germany	7.76	7.91	7.75	7.91	
10	A	Adrian Strzałkowski	Poland	7.87	7.83	7.57	7.87	
11	B	Yeoryios Tsakonas	Greece	7.58	7.72	7.79	7.79	
12	B	Emanuele Catania	Italy	x	7.78	7.77	7.78	
13	B	Daniel Dobrev	Bulgaria	x	x	7.70	7.70	
14	B	Jean Marie Okutu	Spain	7.27	x	7.65	7.65	
15	B	Morten Jensen	Denmark	x	7.64	x	7.64	
16	B	Márk Szabó	Hungary	7.62	7.39	7.26	7.62	
17	A	Kevin Ojiaku	Italy	7.35	7.56	7.48	7.56	
18	A	Tomas Vitonis	Lithuania	x	3.35	7.56	7.56	
19	A	Oleksiy Kasyanov	Ukraine	7.50	x	7.55	7.55	
20	A	Arsen Sargsyan	Armenia	x	7.44	7.38	7.44	
21	A	Rain Kask	Estonia	7.40	x	x	7.40	
22	A	Andreas Otterling	Sweden	7.39	x	x	7.39	
23	B	Darius Aučyna	Lithuania	7.38	7.30	x	7.38	
24	B	Valentin Toboc	Romania	7.20	7.33	x	7.33	
25	A	Stefano Tremigliozzi	Italy	7.26	x	x	7.26	

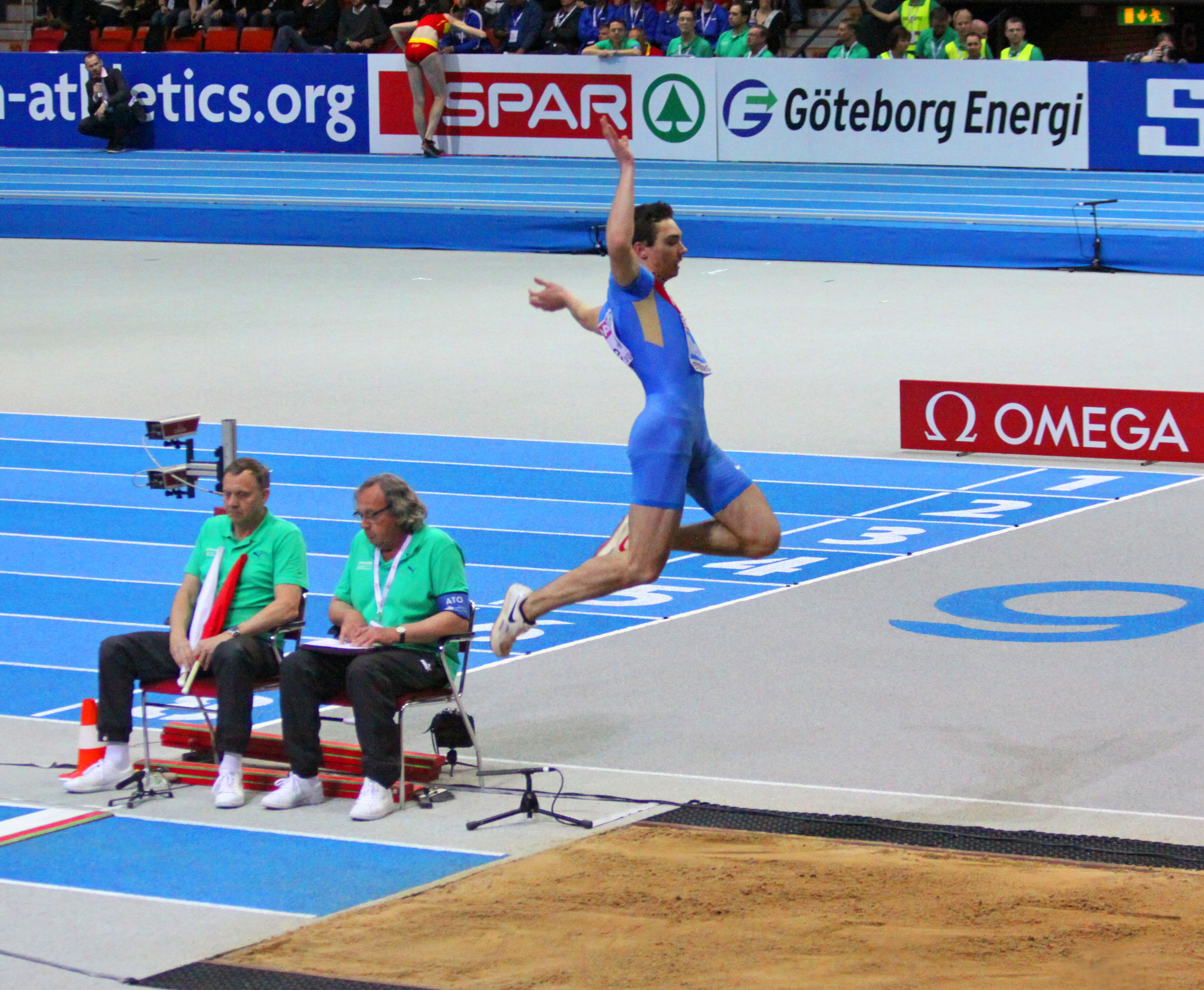
Aleksandr Menkov, the winner, at the final.

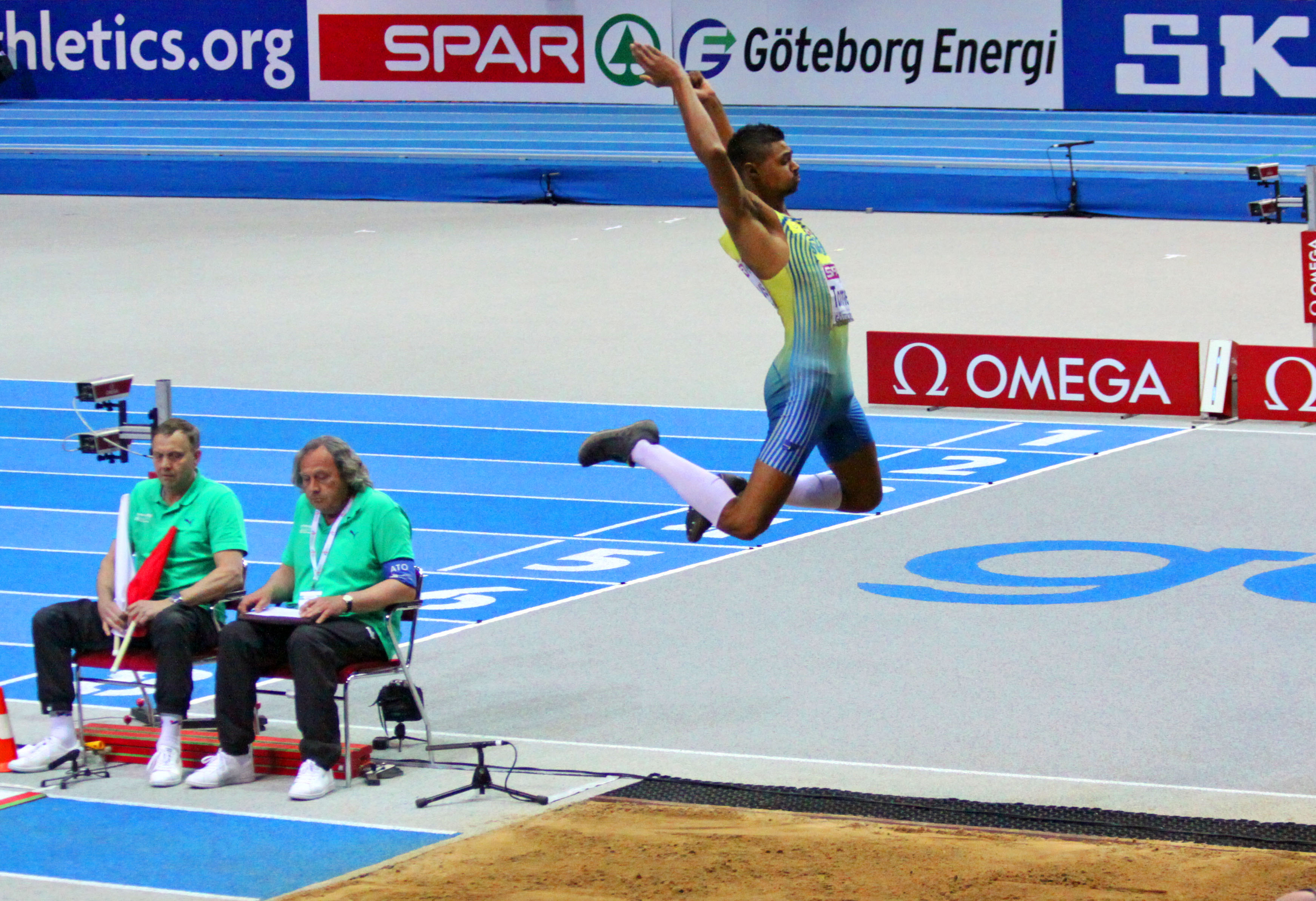
Michel Torneus at the final.

=== Final ===
The final was held at 17:00.

Rank	Athlete	Nationality	#1	#2	#3	#4	#5	#6	Result	Notes
1st place, gold medalist(s)	Aleksandr Menkov	Russia	8.28	x	x	8.31	x	x	8.31	WL
2nd place, silver medalist(s)	Michel Tornéus	Sweden	8.27	8.10	x	7.95	7.12	8.29	8.29	NR
3rd place, bronze medalist(s)	Christian Reif	Germany	8.01	x	7.87	8.07	x	8.03	8.07	
4	Eero Haapala	Finland	x	7.87	8.05	7.87	7.84	x	8.05	
5	Louis Tsatoumas	Greece	7.88	8.00	x	7.94	x	x	8.00	
6	Tommi Evilä	Finland	7.96	—	7.79	x	—	7.90	7.96	SB
7	Chris Tomlinson	Great Britain	7.93	7.95	7.64	7.94	7.91	7.88	7.95	
8	Elvijs Misāns	Latvia	7.61	7.68	7.63	2.79	x	7.30	7.68	
