= Julian Howard =

German long jumper (born 1989)

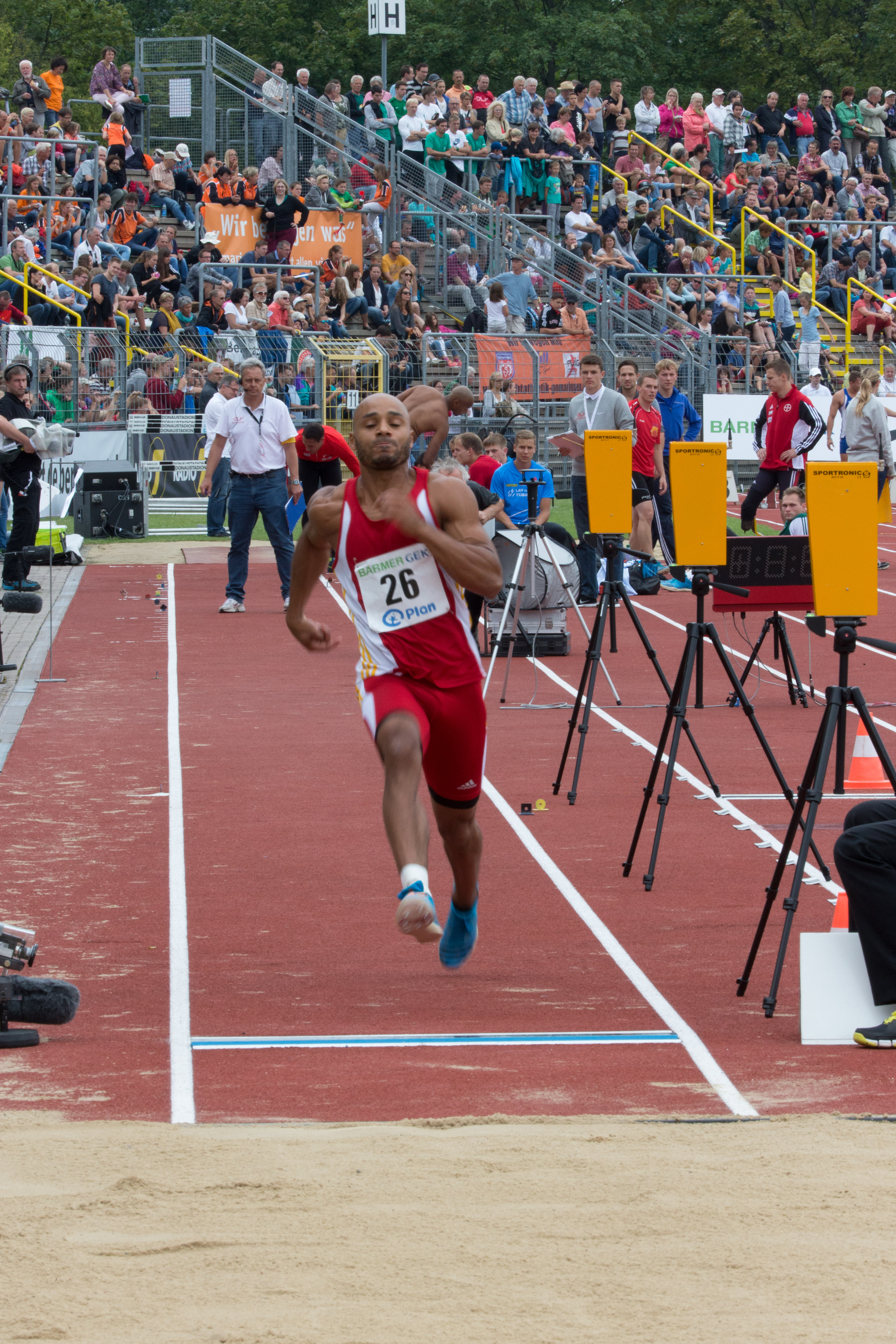
- Howard in 2014

Personal information
- Full name: Julian Anthony Howard
- Born: 3 April 1989 (age 36) Mannheim, West Germany
- Education: Karlsruhe Institute of Technology
- Height: 1.78 m (5 ft 10 in)
- Weight: 76 kg (168 lb)

Sport
- Country: Germany
- Sport: Athletics
- Event: Long jump
- Club: MTG Mannheim; LG Region Karlsruhe
- Coached by: Holger Prestor; Udo Metzler

Julian Anthony Howard (born 3 April 1989 in Mannheim) is a German athlete specialising in the long jump. He finished fifth at the 2017 European Indoor Championships.

His personal bests in the event are 8.07 metres outdoors (+0.5 m/s, Wesel 2013) and 8.04 metres indoors (Karlsruhe 2015).

His mother comes from Jamaica.

== International competitions ==
| Year | Competition | Venue | Position | Notes |
Representing Germany
| 2008 | World Junior Championships | Bydgoszcz, Poland | 8th | 7.40 m |
| 2011 | European U23 Championships | Ostrava, Czech Republic | 21st (q) | 7.13 m |
| 2013 | Universiade | Kazan, Russia | 5th | 8.00 m |
| 2014 | European Championships | Zürich, Switzerland | 21st (q) | 7.63 m |
| 2015 | European Indoor Championships | Prague, Czech Republic | 13th (q) | 7.65 m |
| 2017 | European Indoor Championships | Belgrade, Serbia | 5th | 7.97 m |
| 2017 | World Championships | London, United Kingdom | 22nd (q) | 7.72 m |
| 2017 | Universiade | Taipei, Taiwan | – | NM |
| 2018 | European Championships | Berlin, Germany | 19th (q) | 7.64 m |
