= 2014 IAAF World Indoor Championships – Men's long jump =

The men's Long Jump at the 2014 IAAF World Indoor Championships took place on 7–8 March 2014.

== Medalists ==
Gold	Silver	Bronze
Mauro Vinícius da Silva; Brazil	Li Jinzhe; China	Michel Tornéus; Sweden

== Records ==
Standing records prior to the 2014 IAAF World Indoor Championships
World record	Carl Lewis (USA)	8.79	New York City, United States	27 January 1984
Championship record	Iván Pedroso (CUB)	8.62	Maebashi, Japan	7 March 1999
World Leading	Aleksandr Menkov (RUS)	8.30	Moscow, Russia	2 February 2014
African record	Ignisious Gaisah (GHA)	8.36	Stockholm, Sweden	2 February 2006
Asian record	Su Xiongfeng (CHN)	8.27	Nanjing, China	11 March 2010
European record	Sebastian Bayer (GER)	8.71	Turin, Italy	8 March 2009
North and Central American and Caribbean record	Carl Lewis (USA)	8.79	New York City, United States	27 January 1984
Oceanian Record	Henry Frayne (AUS)	8.23	Istanbul, Turkey	10 March 2012
South American record	Irving Saladino (PAN)	8.42	Paiania, Greece	13 February 2008

== Qualification standards ==
Indoor	Outdoor
8.16

== Schedule ==
Date	Time	Round
7 March 2014	19:20	Qualification
8 March 2014	19:50	Final

== Results ==
=== Qualification ===
Qualification: 8.05 (Q) or at least 8 best performers (q) qualified for the final.

Rank	Name	Nationality	#1	#2	#3	Mark	Notes
1	Adrian Strzałkowski	Poland	8.18			8.18	Q, =NR
2	Christian Reif	Germany	7.80	7.90	8.13	8.13	Q, SB
3	Louis Tsatoumas	Greece	7.98	x	8.10	8.10	Q
4	Li Jinzhe	China	8.02	–	8.08	8.08	Q
5	Michel Tornéus	Sweden	6.24	x	8.08	8.08	Q
6	Aleksandr Menkov	Russia	8.04	–	–	8.04	q
7	Mauro Vinícius da Silva	Brazil	7.64	7.58	8.02	8.02	q, SB
8	Luis Rivera	Mexico	7.58	8.01	–	8.01	q, NR
9	Tyron Stewart	United States	8.00	–	7.79	8.00	
10	Ignisious Gaisah	Netherlands	7.90	7.99	7.84	7.99	SB
11	Irving Saladino	Panama	7.73	7.94	7.88	7.94	
12	Zarck Visser	South Africa	x	7.93	7.64	7.93	SB
13	Ngonidzashe Makusha	Zimbabwe	7.63	7.85	7.69	7.85	
14	Fabrice Lapierre	Australia	7.76	x	7.70	7.76	
15	Damar Forbes	Jamaica	7.69	7.63	7.58	7.69	
16	Jeff Henderson	United States	6.96	7.43	x	7.43	
17	Arsen Sargsyan	Armenia	7.28	7.39	x	7.39	

=== Final ===
Rank	Name	Nationality	#1	#2	#3	#4	#5	#6	Mark	Notes
1st place, gold medalist(s)	Mauro Vinícius da Silva	Brazil	8.06	7.94	x	8.04	x	8.28	8.28	NR
2nd place, silver medalist(s)	Li Jinzhe	China	8.19	8.07	8.23	7.52	x	x	8.23	SB
3rd place, bronze medalist(s)	Michel Tornéus	Sweden	x	8.13	x	8.21	x	8.10	8.21	SB
4	Louis Tsatoumas	Greece	7.98	8.13	x	x	8.10	x	8.13	
5	Aleksandr Menkov	Russia	8.01	8.07	x	8.08	–	–	8.08	
6	Adrian Strzałkowski	Poland	7.80	7.80	x	7.96	7.93	x	7.96	
7	Luis Rivera	Mexico	7.79	7.93	7.90	7.92	7.93	7.86	7.93	
8	Christian Reif	Germany	7.60	7.67	x	x	7.75	x	7.75	
