= Aleksandr Menkov =

Russian long jumper (born 1990)

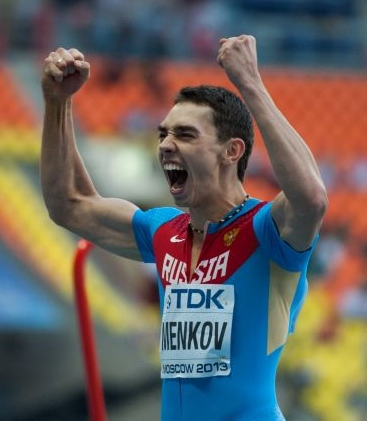
- Menkov at the 2013 World Championships

Personal information
- Born: 7 December 1990 (age 35) Minusinsk, Russian SFSR, Soviet Union
- Height: 1.78 m (5 ft 10 in)
- Weight: 74 kg (163 lb)

Sport
- Country: Russia
- Sport: Athletics
- Event: Long jump

Achievements and titles
- Personal bests: 8.56 m NR (Moscow 2013)
Medal record
World Championships
Gold medal – first place	2013 Moscow	Long jump
World Indoor Championships
Bronze medal – third place	2012 Istanbul	Long jump
European Indoor Championships
Gold medal – first place	2013 Gothenburg	Long jump
European U23 Championships
Gold medal – first place	2011 Ostrava	Long jump
European Junior Championships
Gold medal – first place	2009 Novi Sad	Long jump
Universiade
Silver medal – second place	2013 Kazan	Long jump
- Updated on 15 August 2012

Aleksandr Aleksandrovich Menkov (Russian: Александр Александрович Меньков, born 7 December 1990 in Minusinsk, Krasnoyarsk Krai) is a Russian athlete who competes in the long jump.

== Career ==
Menkov set a personal best of 8.16 metres in Kemerovo in June 2009. He won the gold medal at the 2009 European Junior Championships, and competed at the 2009 World Championships without qualifying for the final. At his season opener in January 2011, the Siberian regional championships, he improved his personal best by one centimetre to 8.17 metres. The highlight of this season was a 6th place at the 2011 World Championships. At the 2012 Olympic Games, he placed 11th.

Menkov won gold at the 2013 World Championships with a new Russian national record of 8.56 metres.

== Achievements ==
Year	Competition	Venue	Position	Notes
Representing Russia
2009	European Junior Championships	Novi Sad, Serbia	1st	7.98 m
2009	World Championships	Berlin, Germany	32nd (q)	7.72 m
2011	European Team Championships	Stockholm, Sweden	1st	8.20 m
2011	European U23 Championships	Ostrava, Czech Republic	1st	8.08 m
2011	World Championships	Daegu, South Korea	6th	8.19 m
2011	DécaNation	Nice, France	1st	8.20 m
2012	World Indoor Championships	Istanbul, Turkey	3rd	8.22 m
2012	Olympic Games	London, United Kingdom	11th	7.78 m
2013	European Indoor Championships	Gothenburg, Sweden	1st	8.31 m
2013	Universiade	Kazan, Russia	2nd	8.42 m
2013	World Championships	Moscow, Russia	1st	8.56 m
2014	World Indoor Championships	Sopot, Poland	5th	8.08 m
2014	European Championships	Zürich, Switzerland	13th (q)	7.78 m
2015	World Championships	Beijing, China	6th	8.02 m
Competing as neutral
2017	World Championships	London, United Kingdom	4th	8.27 m
