= Garrett Johnson =

American shot putter (born 1984)

Garrett W. Johnson
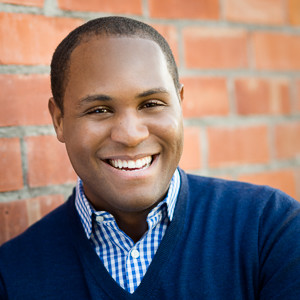

Personal information
- Nationality: United States
- Born: May 24, 1984 (age 42) Tampa, Florida, U.S.

Sport
- Sport: Track and field
- Event: Shot putter
- College team: Florida State University
Medal record
Men's athletics (track and field)
Representing the United States
Pan American Junior Championships
Gold medal – first place	2003 Bridgetown	Shot put

Garrett W. Johnson (born May 24, 1984) is an American entrepreneur and award-winning shot putter. Johnson won the 2006 NCAA Indoor and Outdoor Shot Put Championship, and was also named a Rhodes Scholar in 2006 on behalf of the United States. He is the cofounder and currently serves as Chairman of the Foundation for American Innovation. Johnson is also Cofounder and chief operating officer of Hydra Host, a startup valued at $500m backed by Peter Thiel.

== Career ==
Upon graduation from Oxford, Johnson served as a staffer for the Senate's Committee on Foreign Relations.

In 2011, along with Ash Rust and John Fallone, Johnson co-founded SendHub a text message marketing company.

In 2014, Johnson co-founded the Lincoln Network, a 501(c)(3) nonprofit.

== Academic ==
Garrett Johnson was the salutatorian in the 2002 graduating class at Tampa Baptist Academy in Tampa, Florida, where he won multiple state championships.

Johnson was a student in the FSU Center for Academic Retention and Enhancement (CARE), beginning in the Summer of 2002. He attended FSU, graduating magna cum laude in three years with a double major in Political Science and English. Johnson was named an academic All-American in 2005 and 2006 and earned the Florida State Golden Torch Award given to the FSU student-athlete with the highest GPA. Johnson, a scholar athlete, was named to the FSU Dean's list with a 3.5 GPA or better and the FSU President's list with a 4.0 GPA throughout his undergraduate career.

Johnson completed a master's degree in migration studies as a 2006 Rhodes Scholar at Exeter College, Oxford University.

== Track and field ==
- Shot Put
- 2006, NCAA Indoor National Champion (Shot Put)
- 2006, NCAA Outdoor National Champion (Shot Put)
- 2008, Oxford University club record

Johnson was coached by Harlis Meaders. Johnson was a finalist in the 2008 USA Track & Field Olympic Trials, but failed to post a mark, fouling on all attempts.

== Personal life ==
Johnson resides in Florida and has been married since 2014. He serves on the board of directors of the Foundation for Florida's Future. Additionally, he is an advisor for the Cicero Institute, and a Steering Committee Member of the Tech Talent Project.

== Awards ==
- 2004 Seminole Impact Award
- 2004–2005 ESPN The Magazine Second-Team Academic All America
- 2005 Arthur Ashe Jr. Sports Scholar
- 2005–2006 ESPN The Magazine University Academic All American of the Year
- 2005–2006 ESPN The Magazine First-Team Academic All America
- 2006 Rhodes Scholar
- 2006 USTFCCCA Division I National Outdoor Men's Field Co-Athlete of the Year
- 2007 Inaugural Frank Dolson/Penn Relays Award
