= Greg Rutherford =

English athlete (born 1986)

Greg Rutherford MBE
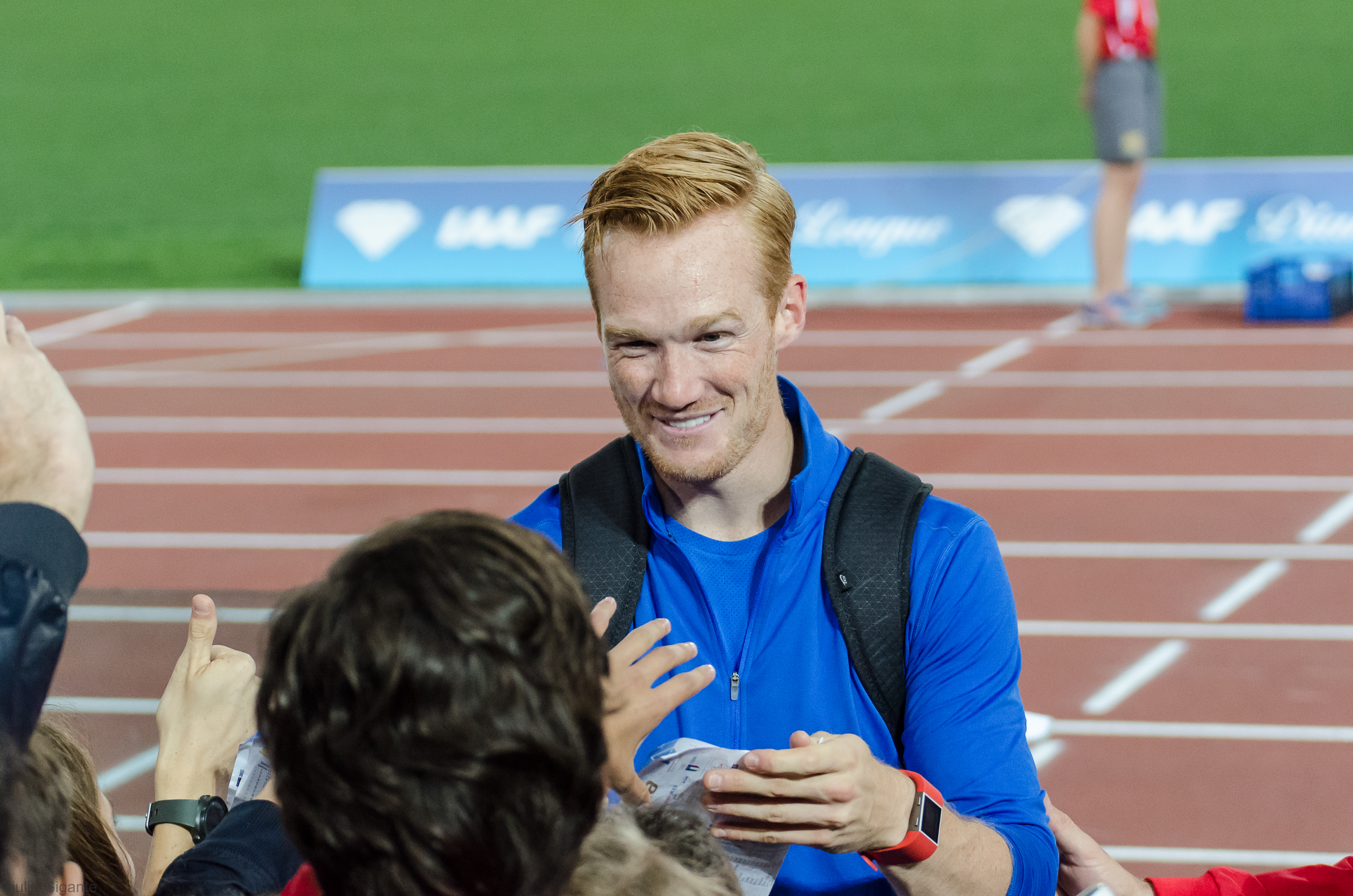
- Rutherford in 2016

Personal information
- Full name: Gregory James Rutherford
- Born: 17 November 1986 (age 39) Milton Keynes, Buckinghamshire, England
- Height: 1.88 m (6 ft 2 in)
- Weight: 92 kg (203 lb)

Sport
- Sport: Men's athletics
- Event: Long jump
- Club: Marshall Milton Keynes Athletics Club
- Turned pro: 2005

Achievements and titles
- Personal bests: Long jump 8.51 m (Chula Vista 2014); 100 m 10.26 (Gateshead 2010)
Medal record
Representing Great Britain
Olympic Games
Gold medal – first place	2012 London	Long jump
Bronze medal – third place	2016 Rio de Janeiro	Long jump
World Championships
Gold medal – first place	2015 Beijing	Long jump
Diamond League
First place	2015	Long jump
European Championships
Gold medal – first place	2014 Zürich	Long jump
Gold medal – first place	2016 Amsterdam	Long jump
Silver medal – second place	2006 Gothenburg	Long jump
European Junior Championships
Gold medal – first place	2005 Kaunas	Long jump
Representing England
Commonwealth Games
Gold medal – first place	2014 Glasgow	Long jump
Silver medal – second place	2010 Delhi	Long jump

Gregory James Rutherford (born 17 November 1986) is a retired British track and field athlete who specialised in the long jump. He represented Great Britain at the Olympics, World and European Championships, and England at the Commonwealth Games. Rutherford is the most recent of only five athletes to win the ''Grand Slam" of Olympic, World, European and Commonwealth titles in the same event and the only one also to win the Diamond League.

A European Junior Champion in 2005, Rutherford first made a mark on the senior circuit with a silver medal in the 2006 European Athletics Championships. Between 2012 and 2016 Rutherford won the long jump gold medal at the 2012 Summer Olympics, 2014 Commonwealth Games, 2014 and 2016 European Athletics Championships and 2015 World Athletics Championships and topped the 2015 IAAF Diamond League rankings in the event. A bronze at the 2016 Summer Olympics proved his final major medal, as ankle injuries plagued him for the next two years. He retired from the sport through injury in 2018.

From 4 September 2015, when his Diamond League victory was confirmed with a fourth event win in Zürich, until his withdrawal from the British Athletics Championships in June 2016, Rutherford held every available elite outdoor title; national, continental, World, Olympic, Diamond League and Commonwealth.

Rutherford is the British record holder, both outdoors and indoors, for this event with his personal bests of 8.51 m (outdoors) and 8.26 m (indoors). He was a five time national outdoor champion and his British record places him in the top 25 all time.

In September 2021 Rutherford was selected as part of the British bobsleigh team but was injured during preparations to qualify for the 2022 Winter Olympics.

== Early life ==
Gregory James Rutherford was born on 17 November 1986 and grew up in Milton Keynes where he attended Two Mile Ash Primary School and went on to Denbigh School. He played several sports as a youth including football, rugby and badminton. He had trials with Premier League football club Aston Villa at the age of 14 before deciding to pursue a career in athletics.

He is the great-grandson of footballer Jock Rutherford, who won three Football League First Division titles with Newcastle United and 11 England caps, and is also the oldest player ever to have played for Arsenal; his grandfather, John Rutherford, also played for Arsenal.

== Career ==
=== 2005–2007 ===
Rutherford became the youngest ever winner of the long jump event at the AAA Championships in 2005, aged 18. He also won the European Junior Championships that year, setting a British junior record of 8.14 m.

Rutherford was selected to represent England at the 2006 Commonwealth Games, where he finished 8th. He won the AAA championships again that year with a jump of 8.26 m. On 8 August 2006, he won the silver medal in the long jump at the European Athletics Championships in Gothenburg with a jump of 8.13 m.

Rutherford missed much of the 2007 season due to a succession of injury problems, including an ankle injury for which he had surgery in February of that year. He competed at the 2007 World Championships but did not reach the final, finishing 21st in the qualifying round.

=== 2008–2011 ===
Rutherford won the AAA title on 12 July 2008, reaching the Olympic qualifying distance of 8.20 m. He also won the London Grand Prix at Crystal Palace two weeks later with a distance of 8.16 m. At the 2008 Olympics in Beijing Rutherford qualified for the final in third place with a distance of 8.16 m. In the final, he had two no-jumps in the first two rounds, and recorded a distance of 7.84 m in the third round. This was not enough to place him in the top 8 who would continue to the final three rounds, and he finished in 10th place.

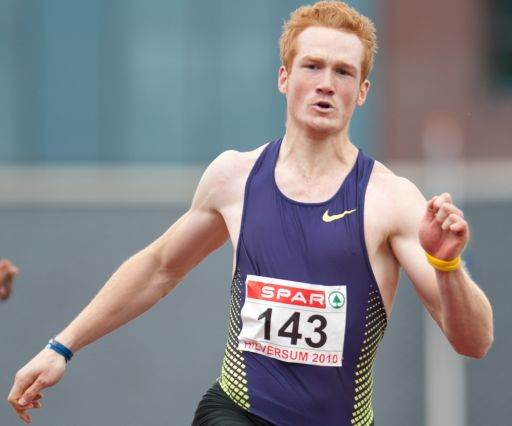
Rutherford competing in the 100 m at the Arena Games in Hilversum, 2010

Rutherford set a British record of 8.30 m on 20 August 2009 in the qualifying round of the World Athletics Championships in Berlin, improving the previous record held by Chris Tomlinson by 1 cm. He was unable to match this performance in the final of the event, finishing fifth with a jump of 8.17 m.

Rutherford did not compete at the 2010 European Championships due to a foot injury. On 18 September he set a personal best for the 100 m of 10.26 seconds in the invitational event at the Great North City Games. At the 2010 Commonwealth Games, he won the silver medal with a jump of 8.22 m.

Rutherford extended his personal best in the long jump to 8.32 m at the Eugene Diamond League meeting on 4 June 2011, although it was not recognised as a British record as it was wind assisted. In July 2011 Chris Tomlinson broke Rutherford's British record with a jump of 8.35 m in Paris. At the 2011 World Championships, Rutherford injured a hamstring during the qualifying round and did not reach the final.

After the 2011 season, Rutherford worked on his take-off technique with his coach Dan Pfaff, adopting a technique based on that of Carl Lewis of making the penultimate step of the approach a lateral step outwards.

=== 2012 ===
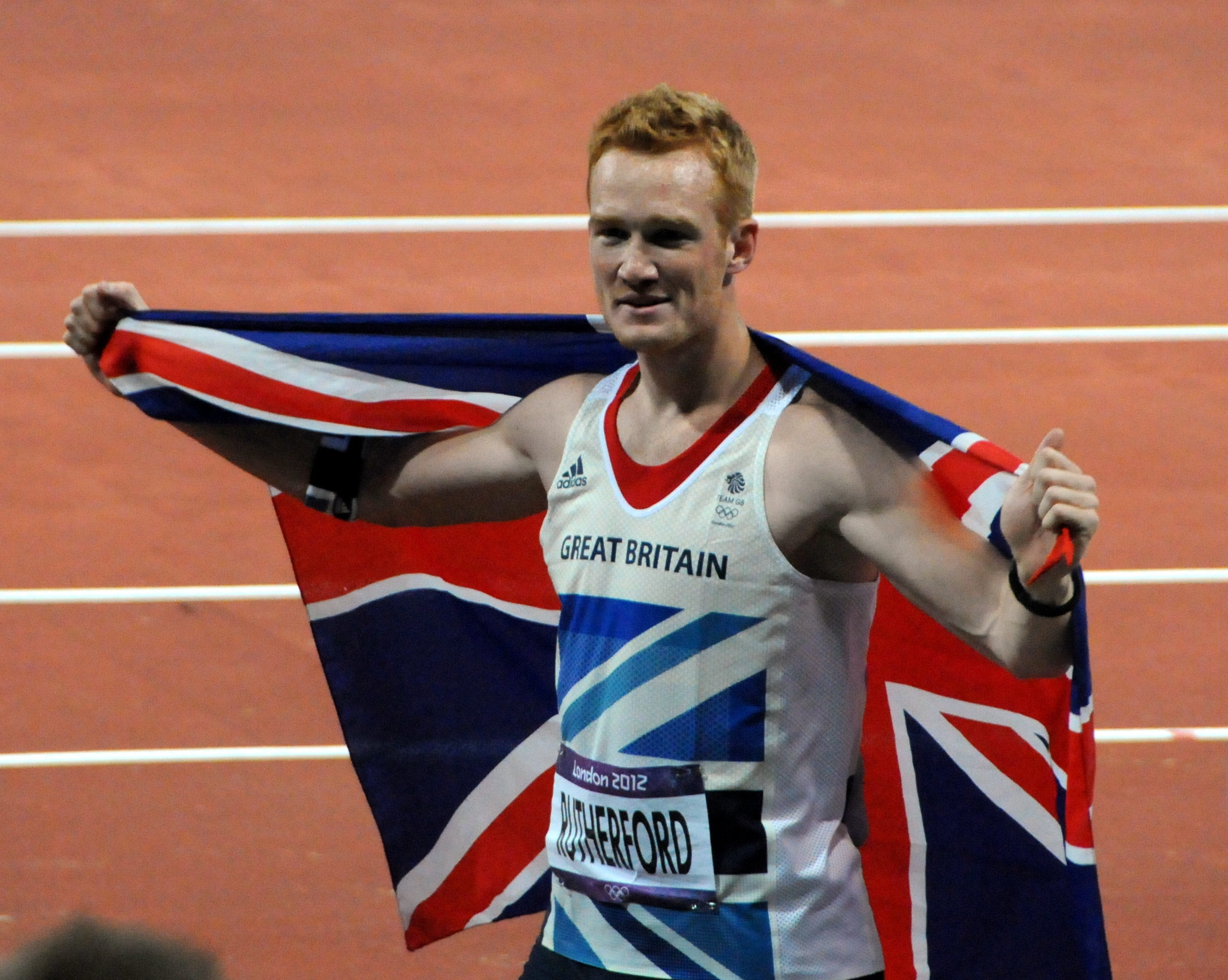
Rutherford after winning the long jump at the 2012 Olympics

Rutherford equalled Tomlinson's British record on 3 May 2012 with a jump of 8.35 m at the OTC Pre-Olympic Series II event in Chula Vista, California. It was also the longest jump of 2012 at the time (later equalled by Sergey Morgunov on 20 June).

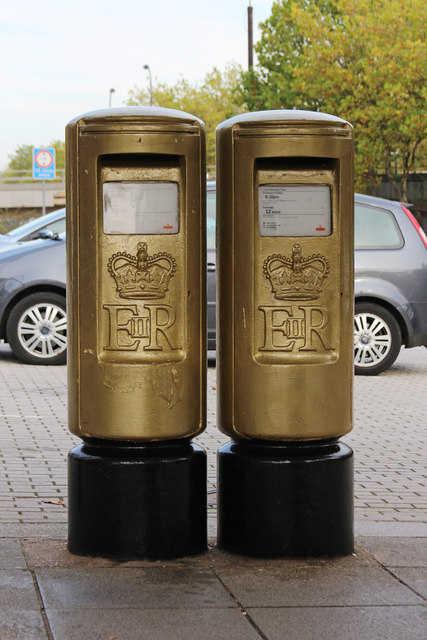
Pair of post boxes in Milton Keynes painted gold in honour of Rutherford

At the 2012 Olympics in London, Rutherford reached the final with a jump of 8.08 m, qualifying in fourth place. In the final, he took the lead in the second round with a jump of 8.21 m, improving to 8.31 m in the fourth round which proved to be the winning jump. Rutherford became the second British man to win Olympic gold in the long jump, the first was Lynn Davies in 1964. Although his winning distance of 8.31 m was the shortest since 1972, it was 15 cm ahead of silver medallist Mitchell Watt and his second-best jump of 8.21 m would also have been enough to win the gold. Rutherford's gold was one of three won by British track and field athletes on the evening of 4 August 2012 (the others were won by Jessica Ennis in the heptathlon and Mo Farah in the men's 10,000 m); this was the first time that three gold medals had been won by British athletes in the same Olympic athletics session.

Following his gold medal, Rutherford (as with the other British 2012 Olympic champions) was featured on a Royal Mail postage stamp, and two post boxes in Milton Keynes were painted gold in his honour.

=== 2013 ===
Rutherford parted company with Dan Pfaff, his coach, in early 2013, when Pfaff returned to his native United States.

Rutherford sustained a hamstring injury during the Paris Diamond League meeting on 6 July, which forced him to withdraw midway through the competition. British Athletics delayed announcing their selection for the men's long jump at the World Championships due to the injury, but on 30 July Rutherford's selection was confirmed after he passed fitness tests. At the championships Rutherford failed to reach the final, finishing 14th in the qualifying round on 14 August with a jump of 7.87 m. In the autumn of 2013 Rutherford appointed Jonas Tawiah-Dodoo as his coach. Tawiah-Dodoo also coaches 100 m 2013 European Junior Champion Chijindu Ujah and 200 m 2011 European Junior Champion David Bolarinwa. Rutherford's decision to work with a sprint coach was inspired by advice from former World and Olympic long jump champion Dwight Phillips.

=== 2014 ===
In February 2014, Rutherford said he would trial for the winter sports events of bobsleigh and skeleton, in the hope of competing in the 2018 Winter Olympics. He told The Guardian: "There is something about going down the ice head first that massively appeals to me. I genuinely want to try skeleton and bobsleigh. [...] If I am good enough, my plan will be to continue through to the summer Olympics and after 2016 either switch or spend my winters doing the new sport." In April, at an early season event at the Olympic Training Center in Chula Vista, California, Rutherford jumped a personal best of 8.51 m, setting a new British record. The new record was disputed by rival long-jumper Chris Tomlinson, who used video evidence to suggest the jump was illegal, but a technical panel assembled by UK Athletics deemed the video evidence to be inconclusive, and the record was upheld.

Rutherford won the gold medal at the Commonwealth Games in July with a jump of 8.20 m. In August he won gold at the European Athletics Championships with a jump of 8.29 m.

=== 2015 ===
In February 2015 Rutherford won the Birmingham Indoor Grand Prix with a jump of 8.17 m, a new indoor personal best. In June he won the Diamond League events in Birmingham with a jump of 8.35 m, and in Oslo with a jump of 8.25 m.

Rutherford won the gold medal at the World Championships on 25 August with a jump of 8.41 m, his second-longest jump ever and the furthest he has so far jumped in a major championship. He is one of only six athletes to jump over 8.40 m in a world championship final this century. His victory made him the fifth British athlete to hold Olympic, World, European and Commonwealth titles simultaneously, after Daley Thompson, Linford Christie, Sally Gunnell and Jonathan Edwards.

The following week, Rutherford won the long jump at the final IAAF Diamond League event of the year, the Weldklasse in Zurich. In doing so, he confirmed his victory in the overall Diamond race for the event, making him the first British athlete ever to hold all available outdoor titles – National (British), Continental (European), Commonwealth, Diamond League, World and Olympic titles – at the same time.

=== 2016 ===
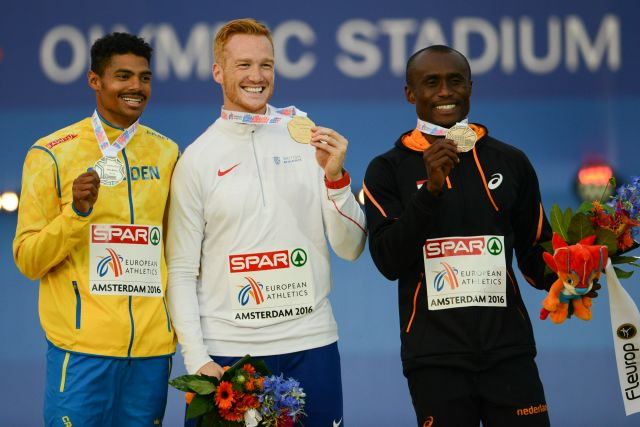
Rutherford (centre) during the medal ceremony at the 2016 European Athletics Championships in Amsterdam

In February 2016 Rutherford set a new British indoor long jump record of 8.26 m in Albuquerque, New Mexico. In July he successfully defended his European Championship title with a jump of 8.25 m.

Rutherford took the bronze medal at the 2016 Summer Olympics with a jump of 8.29 m in the final round, behind Jeff Henderson who won gold and Luvo Manyonga who won silver. He expressed his disappointment afterwards at not having retained his Olympic title, describing it as a "bitter pill".

At the end of the 2016 season, Rutherford hosted a long jump competition using the pit he had built in his back garden, for members of his athletics club, Marshall Milton Keynes. Although he did not compete in the long jump, he competed in the alternative standing long jump event, reaching a distance of 3.26 metres. There are plans for other, larger competitions in the future, with Rutherford planning to invite many jumpers from the international circuit to compete. The event was held as part of the nationwide "I Am Team GB" sports day.

=== 2017–2018 ===
In July 2017 Rutherford announced that he could not defend his title on home ground at the upcoming World Championships as he had not recovered from an ankle injury sustained the previous month. The following February he withdrew from the 2018 Commonwealth Games, due to be held on the Gold Coast in Australia that April, due to a lack of training following his recovery from the ankle injury. In June of that year Rutherford announced his retirement from the sport due to ongoing pain in his left ankle: he also expressed an interest in taking up track cycling, revealing that he had discussed the possibility of undertaking performance testing with British Cycling. He subsequently returned to the London Stadium to compete at the 2018 Anniversary Games in July, and made his last appearance in competition at the Great North CityGames in Newcastle in September 2018. Following his retirement, Rutherford and fellow athlete Morgan Lake undertook assessments with British Rowing in November 2018, based on their World Class Start talent identification programme: he set a new record for their leg press test.

=== Sledding career ===
Having already expressed an interest in competing in bobsleigh or skeleton in 2014, In April 2021 Rutherford announced that he had joined the Team GB bobsleigh setup, having started training again during the COVID-19 lockdowns in 2020. He stated that he had been encouraged to take up the sport by double Olympic bobsleigh champion Kaillie Humphries. Rutherford trained alongside his new team-mates for the first time the following month. In September 2021, Rutherford was selected as part of the British bobsleigh team for the 2021–22 Bobsleigh World Cup and which would attempt to qualify for the two-man and four-man events 2022 Winter Olympics in Beijing, forming part of a five-man squad alongside pilot Lamin Deen and fellow push athletes Joel Fearon, Ben Simons and Toby Olubi. However, Deen and his crew did not achieve the qualifying standard of three top 12 finishes in the World Cup, resulting in them not securing a slot at the Olympics.

== Media appearances ==
Rutherford has appeared in several popular light entertainment television programmes.

In 2012, Rutherford and gymnast Louis Smith took part in an episode of The Million Pound Drop Live as part of their 'Celebrity Games' series.

In 2013, he appeared in an episode of Fake Reaction, a celebrity special edition of The Cube (winning £20,000 for Battersea Dogs & Cats Home and Hula Animal Rescue), and was a panellist on Would I Lie to You?.

In 2014, Rutherford participated in The Great Sport Relief Bake Off. and appeared as a contestant on The Chase: Celebrity Special, but was beaten by the chaser.

In 2015, he was a participant in the Channel 4 programme Time Crashers, in which ten celebrities are transported to different historical settings in the United Kingdom where they experience the life of the lower classes and are set tasks relating to that era.

From September 2016, Rutherford was a contestant in the fourteenth series of Strictly Come Dancing where he was partnered with professional Natalie Lowe. He was eliminated in week 9, after a dance-off with Claudia Fragapane. Also in 2016, he appeared in five episodes of Season 1 of the television series Battlechefs.

In 2017 Rutherford worked for Eurosport as an analyst for the channel's coverage of the World Athletics Championships after he was unable to compete in the event due to injury.

In 2019, Rutherford won the 14th season of Celebrity MasterChef. Rutherford also appeared in the BBC Two series Pilgrimage, walking Via Francigena, an ancient pilgrimage route to Rome. Rutherford revealed he was brought up as a Jehovah's Witness and was now "non-religious".

In April 2021, Rutherford joined fellow British Olympians Nicola Adams and Kelly Smith, and fitness instructor Mr Motivator in launching the ‘Energy Fit for the Future’ campaign by Smart Energy GB, which aimed at encouraging people to install smart meters in their homes.

At the postponed 2020 Summer Olympics, held in the summer of 2021 in Tokyo, Rutherford was part of Eurosport and Discovery+'s coverage of the Games as a reporter on the ground in Japan.

In 2024, Rutherford became a contestant on the sixteenth series of Dancing on Ice. He was paired with Vanessa James and the couple reached the final of the series, however on the day of the final, they were forced to withdraw from the competition after Rutherford tore his abdominal muscles during training and required hospitalisation. In July 2024, Rutherford won an episode of The Weakest Link. He has appeared on the ITV show You Bet!.

In 2026, Rutherford guest starred in the Makeover Challenge episode of Rupaul's Drag Race: UK vs. the World season three where they were paired with Thai drag queen Gawdland.

== Honours ==
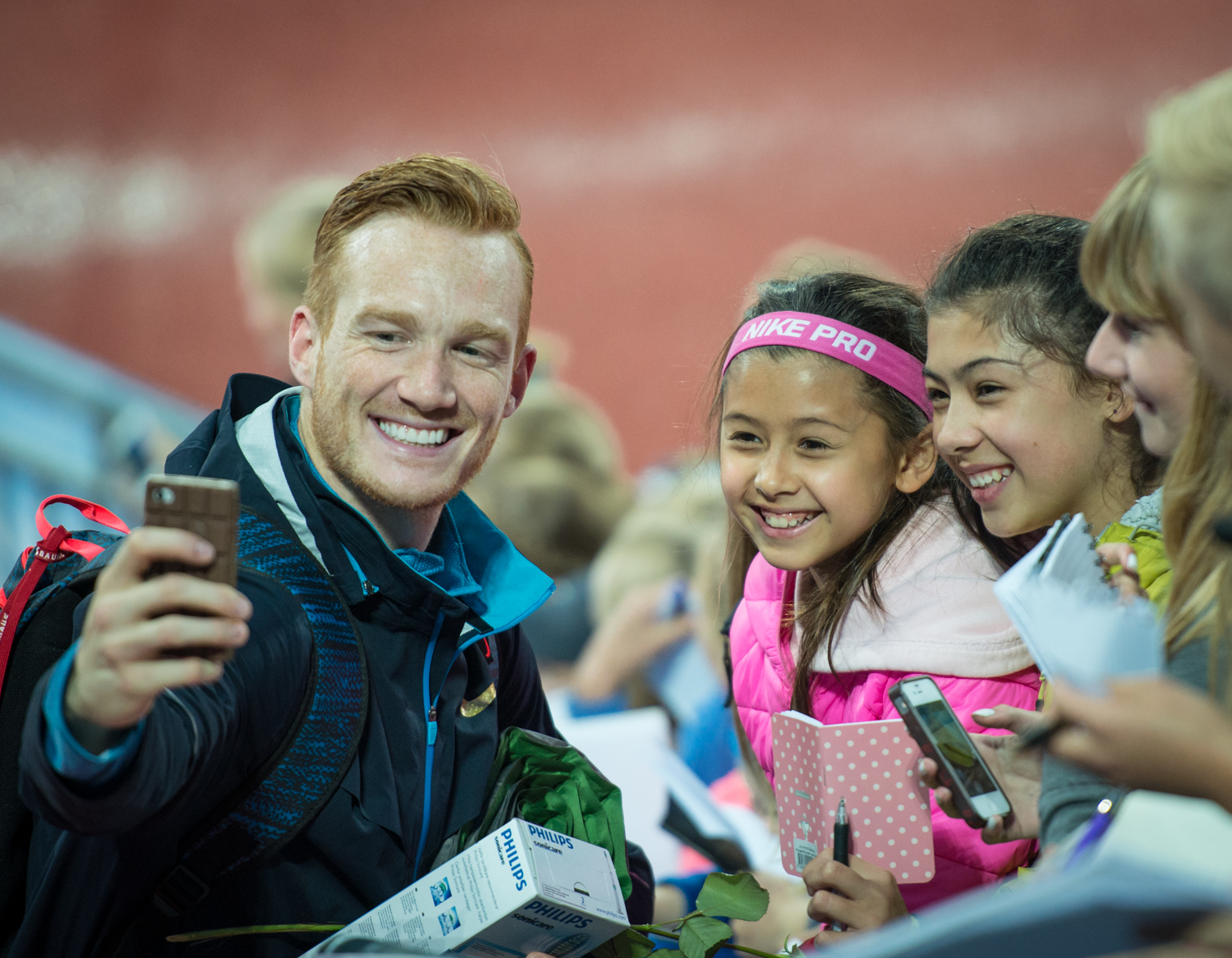
Rutherford with fans in Stockholm at Diamond League in Stockholm Stadium 2015.

Rutherford was appointed Member of the Order of the British Empire (MBE) in the 2013 New Year Honours for services to athletics. In July 2013, he was awarded an honorary doctorate of science by the University of Bedfordshire. Rutherford was given the European Athletics Lifetime Achievement award in October 2018.

A metal statue in honour of Rutherford, by artist Clare Bigger, was erected in Milton Keynes, in June 2014.

== Personal life ==
Rutherford lives in Woburn Sands, a town on the outskirts of Milton Keynes. He and his partner, Susie Verrill, have two sons and one daughter.

Rutherford has stated that he was brought up as a Jehovah's Witness, but was personally irreligious.

Rutherford is an avid supporter of Manchester United, and is an Athlete Ambassador for the global sport for development charity Right To Play. In August 2014, Rutherford was one of 200 public figures who were signatories to a letter to The Guardian opposing Scottish independence in the run-up to September's referendum on that issue.

In March 2017 Rutherford revealed that his former agent Gab Stone had embezzled over £40,000 (over £53,500 in 2025) from him to fund a gambling addiction, which he discovered at the beginning of 2015. Stone was subsequently convicted of fraud by deception and sentenced to 18 months in prison. Rutherford stated that he decided to disclose the fraud to warn other athletes who might be taken advantage of in a similar way.

== Statistics ==
=== Personal bests ===
Event	Time/distance	Venue	Date	Records
60 metres (indoor)	6.68 seconds	Birmingham, United Kingdom	21 February 2009	
100 metres	10.26 seconds	Gateshead, United Kingdom	18 September 2010	
Long jump	8.51 m	Chula Vista, California, USA	25 April 2014	British record
Long jump (indoor)	8.26 m	Albuquerque, New Mexico, USA	5 February 2016	British record

=== Competition record ===
Year	Competition	Venue	Position	Notes
2005	European Junior Championships	Kaunas, Lithuania	1st	8.14 m
2006	Commonwealth Games	Melbourne, Australia	8th	7.85 m
2006	European Championships	Gothenburg, Sweden	2nd	8.13 m
2007	World Championships	Osaka, Japan	21st	7.77 m
2008	Olympic Games	Beijing, China	10th	7.84 m
2009	European Indoor Championships	Turin, Italy	6th	8.00 m
2009	World Championships	Berlin, Germany	5th	8.17 m
2010	World Indoor Championships	Doha, Qatar	11th	7.80 m
2010	Commonwealth Games	New Delhi, India	2nd	8.22 m
2011	World Championships	Daegu, South Korea	15th	8.00 m
2012	Olympic Games	London, United Kingdom	1st	8.31 m
2013	World Championships	Moscow, Russia	14th	7.87 m
2014	Commonwealth Games	Glasgow, United Kingdom	1st	8.20 m
2014	European Championships	Zürich, Switzerland	1st	8.29 m
2015	World Championships	Beijing, China	1st	8.41 m
2016	European Championships	Amsterdam, Netherlands	1st	8.25 m
2016	Olympic Games	Rio de Janeiro, Brazil	3rd	8.29 m

=== National championships wins ===
Rutherford won seven national titles, spanning the period from the AAA Championships to the British Athletics Championships and including two British Indoor Championships.

Championships	Titles	Years
Outdoors	5	2005, 2006. 2008, 2012, 2015
Indoors	2	2010, 2018

== See also ==
- 2012 Summer Olympics and Paralympics gold post boxes
