= Great Britain at the 2022 Winter Olympics =

- Flag of the United Kingdom
- IOC code: GBR
- NOC: British Olympic Association
- Website: www.teamgb.com

in Beijing, China 4–20 February 2022
- Competitors: 50 (27 men and 23 women) in 11 sports
- Flag bearers (opening): Eve Muirhead; Dave Ryding
- Flag bearer (closing): Bruce Mouat
- Officials: Georgina Harland (Chef de Mission)
- Medals Ranked 19th: Gold 1 Silver 1 Bronze 0 Total 2

Winter Olympics appearances (overview)
- 1924; 1928; 1932; 1936; 1948; 1952; 1956; 1960; 1964; 1968; 1972; 1976; 1980; 1984; 1988; 1992; 1994; 1998; 2002; 2006; 2010; 2014; 2018; 2022; 2026

Great Britain competed at the 2022 Winter Olympics in Beijing, China, from 4 to 20 February 2022. The Great Britain team consists of 50 athletes (27 men and 23 women). Eve Muirhead and Dave Ryding were the country's flagbearers during the opening ceremony. Meanwhile curler Bruce Mouat was the flagbearer during the closing ceremony.

British athletes won a total of two medals (one gold, one silver). This result was described as a 'disappointment' by UK Sport. Despite the underwhelming games, Great Britain ranked 19th on the medal table, the same ranking as the previous three Winter Olympic Games.

== Medal and performance targets ==
In July 2018, UK Sport announced a preliminary target of 5–12 medals for the Games, which would at least sustain the level of success experienced at the previous two Games, in both of which 5 medals were won. On 13 January 2022, UK Sport confirmed that they have a target of 3–7 medals for the Games.

Team GB medal target
Event	Medal target	2014 medals	2018 medals	Medals won	Target met
Overall	3–7	5	5	2	X mark

== Summary ==
The team won two medals (a tally below the 3-7 medal target set by UK Sport) during the course of the Games, both in curling. This is also three medals less than the team achieved at both the 2014 and 2018 Winter Olympics. The women's team, skipped by Eve Muirhead won gold, beating Japan 10-3 in the gold medal game, and the men's team, skipped by Bruce Mouat won silver, having lost the gold medal match to Sweden 5-4 after an extra end. The gold medal from women's curling team ensured Great Britain won at least one gold medal for a fourth consecutive Winter Olympics. However, there was no repeat of the successes of previous Olympic Games in the sliding sports, particularly in skeleton, where Great Britain failed to win a medal - the first time this had happened since skeleton was included as an event. 2018 bronze medallist Laura Deas finished 19th. The team had other high hopes with Charlotte Bankes being one of the favourites to win the Women's Snowboard Cross event, but she was beaten in the quarter-finals and finished ninth overall. Izzy Atkin who won a bronze in 2018 in the Women's Ski Slopestyle also dented the team's hopes of further medals, after she withdrew from the games due to injury.

== Administration ==
On 24 May 2020, Team GB announced that former modern pentathlete Georgina Harland would become the first woman to act as Chef de Mission for the British team at an Olympic Games. A bronze medal winner at the 2004 Games in Athens, she went on to serve as a deputy Chef de Mission at both the 2016 and 2020 Summer Games in Rio and Tokyo respectively.

== Medallists ==
The following British competitors won medals at the games. In the by discipline sections below, medallists' names are bolded.

Medal	Name	Sport	Event	Date
Gold	Jennifer Dodds; Hailey Duff; Eve Muirhead; Mili Smith; Vicky Wright	Curling	Women's tournament	20 February
Silver	Grant Hardie; Bobby Lammie; Hammy McMillan Jr. Bruce Mouat; Ross Whyte	Curling	Men's tournament	19 February

== Competitors ==
The team includes three sets of siblings: Izzy and Zoe Atkin (Freestyle skiing); Leonie and Makayla Gerken Schofield (Freestyle skiing); and Farrell and Niall Treacy (Short track speed skating). Gus Kenworthy (Freestyle skiing) competed for the United States at the 2014 and 2018 Winter Games winning a silver medal at the former. In 2019 he announced that he would seek to represent Great Britain at the 2022 Games. He is a dual national having been born in Chelmsford to a British mother and American father.

Former sprinter Montell Douglas (Bobsleigh) became the eighth British athlete to compete at both the Summer and Winter Games. She was preceded by Ethel Muckelt (Figure skating at both Games) and Percy Legard (Modern pentathlon/Nordic combined) in the inter-war period. Like Douglas five other athletes have transferred from athletics to bobsleigh in more recent decades: Colin Campbell; John Herbert; Marcus Adam; Philip Harries; and Allyn Condon. She was the first British woman to compete in different sports at the Summer and Winter Games. Douglas was also one of two athletes together with Jaqueline Mourão of Brazil to have competed at both Beijing 2008 and 2022.

The following is the list of number of competitors participating at the Games per sport/discipline.

Sport	Men	Women	Total
Alpine skiing	2	2	4
Bobsleigh	4	2	6
Cross-country skiing	3	0	3
Curling	5	5	10
Figure skating	1	2	3
Freestyle skiing	5	6	11
Luge	1	0	1
Short track speed skating	2	1	3
Skeleton	2	2	4
Snowboarding	1	2	3
Speed skating	1	1	2
Total	27	23	50

== Alpine skiing ==
Following the qualification period, Great Britain had achieved two quota places in both men's and women's alpine skiing, as a result of which, Great Britain also qualified for the team event. On 21 January 2022, Team GB announced the selection of the four athletes who will represent Great Britain in Beijing led by slalom skier Dave Ryding who will be competing at his fourth Games. On 10 February, Team GB announced that they would not be entering a team in the Mixed Team event.

Athlete	Event	Run 1		Run 2		Total	
Athlete	Event	Time	Rank	Time	Rank	Time	Rank
Billy Major	Men's slalom	DNF					
Dave Ryding	Men's slalom	55.13	16	50.44	7	1:45.57	13
Alexandra Tilley	Women's giant slalom	1:01.40	28	59.42	22	2:00.82	22
Charlie Guest	Women's slalom	53.84	15	54.12	28	1:47.96	21
Alexandra Tilley	Women's slalom	DNF		Did not advance			

== Bobsleigh ==
Following the conclusion of the qualification period in Bobsleigh, Great Britain had qualified sleds in the four-man, two-man and two-woman disciplines. Qualification in the two-woman discipline also granted a place in the monobob event. On 20 January 2022, Team GB announced the selection of eight athletes including two reserves to compete in Beijing. The squad was led by drivers Brad Hall (men's two and four-man bobsleigh) and Mica McNeill (women's monobob and two-woman bobsleigh). In the two-man event, Hall and Nick Gleeson crashed during their third run and eventually finished the event in 11th position.

Athlete	Event	Run 1		Run 2		Run 3		Run 4		Total	
Athlete	Event	Time	Rank	Time	Rank	Time	Rank	Time	Rank	Time	Rank
Brad Hall*; Nick Gleeson	Two-man	59.69	11	1:00.05	13	1:00.22	18	59.96	7	3:59.92	11
Brad Hall*; Greg Cackett; Taylor Lawrence; Nick Gleeson	Four-man	58.60	=5	59.09	6	58.65	6	59.38	7	3:55.72	6
Mica McNeill*; Montell Douglas	Two-woman	1:02.19	19	1:02.35	18	1:02.17	14	1:02.14	13	4:08.85	17

* – Denotes the driver of each sled
Ben Simons and Adele Nicoll were travelling reserves

== Cross-country skiing ==
By meeting the basic qualification standards, Great Britain has qualified at least one male cross-country skier. Following the end of the qualification process, Great Britain had accepted three quota places, all in the men's events. On 22 January 2022, Team GB announced the names of the three athletes who will compete in the cross country events in Beijing. Andrew Musgrave and Andrew Young will both be competing at their fourth Games.

Distance

Athlete	Event	Classical		Freestyle		Total	
Athlete	Event	Time	Rank	Time	Rank	Time	Rank
Andrew Musgrave	Men's 15 km classical	—N/a				41:44.7	46
Andrew Young	Men's 15 km classical	—N/a				42:24.0	51
Andrew Musgrave	Men's 30 km skiathlon	41:16.8	18	38:57.4	18	1:20:46.9	17
Andrew Musgrave	Men's 28.4 km freestyle	—N/a				1:13:29.3	12

Sprint

Athlete	Event	Qualification		Quarterfinal		Semifinal		Final	
Athlete	Event	Time	Rank	Time	Rank	Time	Rank	Time	Rank
James Clugnet	Men's sprint	2:56.72	40	Did not advance					
Andrew Young	Men's sprint	2:55.60	36	Did not advance					
James Clugnet; Andrew Young	Men's team sprint	—N/a				21:15.27	10	Did not advance	20

== Curling ==
Outside of the Olympic Games, Great Britain competes under the flags of its constituent home nations, Scotland, England and Wales (Northern Irish players compete for a combined Ireland); Scotland results are treated as Great Britain for the purposes of Olympic qualification.

Summary

Team	Event	Round robin										Semifinal	Final / BM	
Team	Event	Opposition Score	Opposition Score	Opposition Score	Opposition Score	Opposition Score	Opposition Score	Opposition Score	Opposition Score	Opposition Score	Record Rank	Opposition Score	Opposition Score	Rank
**Bruce Mouat**; **Grant Hardie**; **Bobby Lammie**; **Hammy McMillan Jr.** **Ross Whyte**	Men's tournament	ITA; **W** 7–5	USA; **L** 7–9	NOR; **W** 8–3	CHN; **W** 7–6	DEN; **W** 8–2	SUI; **W** 6–5	SWE; **W** 7–6	ROC; **W** 8–6	CAN; **W** 5–2	1 **Q**	USA; **W** 8–4	SWE; **L** 4–5	2nd place, silver medalist(s)
**Eve Muirhead**; **Vicky Wright**; **Jennifer Dodds**; **Hailey Duff**; **Mili Smith**	Women's tournament	SUI; **L** 5–6	SWE; **W** 8–2	KOR; **L** 7–9	USA; **W** 10–5	DEN; **W** 7–2	CAN; **L** 3–7	JPN; **W** 10–4	CHN; **L** 4–8	ROC; **W** 9–4	3 **Q**	SWE; **W** 12–11	JPN; **W** 10–3	1st place, gold medalist(s)
Bruce Mouat; Jennifer Dodds	Mixed doubles tournament	SWE; **W** 9–5	CAN; **W** 6–4	SUI; **L** 7–8	AUS; **W** 9–8	CZE; **W** 8–3	ITA; **L** 5–7	CHN; **W** 6–5	NOR; **L** 2–6	USA; **W** 8–4	3 **Q**	NOR; **L** 5–6	SWE; **L** 3–9	4

=== Men's tournament ===
Great Britain has qualified their men's team (five athletes), by finishing in the top six teams in the 2021 World Men's Curling Championship. On 14 October 2021, the British Olympic Association announced that Team Bruce Mouat would be their men's team representatives.

Final Round Robin Standings
Team	Skip	Pld	W	L	W–L	PF	PA	EW	EL	BE	SE	S%	DSC	Qualification
Great Britain	Bruce Mouat	9	8	1	–	63	44	39	31	5	10	88.0%	18.81	Playoffs
Sweden	Niklas Edin	9	7	2	–	64	44	43	30	10	11	85.7%	14.02	Playoffs
Canada	Brad Gushue	9	5	4	1–0	58	50	34	38	7	7	84.4%	26.49	Playoffs
United States	John Shuster	9	5	4	0–1	56	61	35	41	4	5	83.0%	32.29	Playoffs
China	Ma Xiuyue	9	4	5	2–1; 1–0	59	62	39	36	6	4	85.4%	23.55	
Norway	Steffen Walstad	9	4	5	2–1; 0–1	58	53	40	36	0	11	84.4%	20.96	
Switzerland	Peter de Cruz	9	4	5	1–2; 1–0	51	54	33	38	13	3	84.5%	15.74	
ROC	Sergey Glukhov	9	4	5	1–2; 0–1	58	58	33	38	6	6	81.2%	33.72	
Italy	Joël Retornaz	9	3	6	–	59	65	36	35	3	8	81.7%	30.76	
Denmark	Mikkel Krause	9	1	8	–	36	71	30	39	3	2	78.1%	32.84	

Round robin
Great Britain had a bye in draws 1, 5 and 9.

Draw 2
Thursday, 10 February, 14:05

Sheet D	1	2	3	4	5	6	7	8	9	10	Final
**Great Britain (Mouat)**	0	1	0	2	0	0	2	1	0	1	**7**
Italy (Retornaz) 🔨	2	0	1	0	0	1	0	0	1	0	**5**

Draw 3
Friday, 11 February, 9:05

Sheet B	1	2	3	4	5	6	7	8	9	10	Final
Great Britain (Mouat)	0	0	2	0	2	2	0	1	0	X	**7**
**United States (Shuster) 🔨**	0	2	0	3	0	0	2	0	2	X	**9**

Draw 4
Friday, 11 February, 20:05

Sheet C	1	2	3	4	5	6	7	8	9	10	Final
**Great Britain (Mouat) 🔨**	1	0	2	2	0	3	0	X	X	X	**8**
Norway (Walstad)	0	1	0	0	1	0	1	X	X	X	**3**

Draw 6
Sunday, 13 February, 9:05

Sheet B	1	2	3	4	5	6	7	8	9	10	Final
China (Ma) 🔨	1	0	0	2	0	0	0	0	1	2	**6**
**Great Britain (Mouat)**	0	4	0	0	0	0	0	3	0	0	**7**

Draw 7
Sunday, 13 February, 20:05

Sheet A	1	2	3	4	5	6	7	8	9	10	Final
**Great Britain (Mouat) 🔨**	2	0	2	0	0	1	0	3	X	X	**8**
Denmark (Krause)	0	0	0	0	1	0	1	0	X	X	**2**

Draw 8
Monday, 14 February, 14:05

Sheet D	1	2	3	4	5	6	7	8	9	10	Final
Switzerland (de Cruz)	0	0	1	0	1	1	0	0	2	0	**5**
**Great Britain (Mouat) 🔨**	0	1	0	2	0	0	1	1	0	1	**6**

Draw 10
Tuesday, 15 February, 20:05

Sheet A	1	2	3	4	5	6	7	8	9	10	Final
Sweden (Edin) 🔨	0	0	1	0	1	0	1	0	2	1	**6**
**Great Britain (Mouat)**	1	2	0	1	0	1	0	2	0	0	**7**

Draw 11
Wednesday, 16 February, 14:05

Sheet B	1	2	3	4	5	6	7	8	9	10	Final
**Great Britain (Mouat) 🔨**	3	0	1	1	0	1	0	1	0	1	**8**
ROC (Glukhov)	0	1	0	0	1	0	2	0	2	0	**6**

Draw 12
Thursday, 17 February, 9:05

Sheet C	1	2	3	4	5	6	7	8	9	10	Final
Canada (Gushue)	0	2	0	0	0	0	0	0	X	X	**2**
**Great Britain (Mouat) 🔨**	2	0	0	1	0	1	0	1	X	X	**5**

Semifinal
Thursday, 17 February, 20:05

Sheet A	1	2	3	4	5	6	7	8	9	10	Final
**Sweden (Edin) 🔨**	0	1	0	2	0	0	0	1	0	1	**5**
Canada (Gushue)	0	0	1	0	2	0	0	0	0	0	**3**

Gold medal game
Saturday, 19 February, 14:50

Sheet B	1	2	3	4	5	6	7	8	9	10	11	Final
**Sweden (Edin)**	0	2	1	0	0	0	0	1	0	0	1	**5**
Great Britain (Mouat) 🔨	1	0	0	1	0	0	1	0	0	1	0	**4**

=== Women's tournament ===
Great Britain has qualified their women's team (five athletes), by finishing first in the round robin in the 2021 Olympic Qualification Event. On 23 December 2021, the British Olympic Association officially named Eve Muirhead, Vicky Wright, Jennifer Dodds, Hailey Duff and Mili Smith to the women's team following a nine-player squad for five events at the beginning of the 2021–22 curling season.

Final Round Robin Standings
Team	Skip	Pld	W	L	W–L	PF	PA	EW	EL	BE	SE	S%	DSC	Qualification
Switzerland	Silvana Tirinzoni	9	8	1	–	67	46	44	36	4	12	81.6%	19.14	Playoffs
Sweden	Anna Hasselborg	9	7	2	–	64	49	39	35	6	12	82.0%	25.02	Playoffs
Great Britain	Eve Muirhead	9	5	4	1–1	63	47	39	33	4	9	80.6%	35.27	Playoffs
Japan	Satsuki Fujisawa	9	5	4	1–1	64	62	40	36	2	13	82.3%	36.00	Playoffs
Canada	Jennifer Jones	9	5	4	1–1	71	59	42	41	1	14	80.4%	45.44	
United States	Tabitha Peterson	9	4	5	2–0	60	64	40	39	2	12	79.5%	33.87	
China	Han Yu	9	4	5	1–1	56	67	38	41	3	10	79.6%	30.06	
South Korea	Kim Eun-jung	9	4	5	0–2	62	66	40	42	3	10	80.8%	27.79	
Denmark	Madeleine Dupont	9	2	7	–	50	68	33	41	7	0	77.2%	23.36	
ROC	Alina Kovaleva	9	1	8	–	50	79	34	45	2	7	78.9%	29.34	

Round robin
Great Britain had a bye in draws 4, 7 and 11.

Draw 1
Thursday, 10 February, 9:05

Sheet A	1	2	3	4	5	6	7	8	9	10	11	Final
Great Britain (Muirhead)	0	0	1	0	0	2	1	0	1	0	0	**5**
**Switzerland (Tirinzoni) 🔨**	0	1	0	1	0	0	0	2	0	1	1	**6**

Draw 2
Thursday, 10 February, 20:05

Sheet B	1	2	3	4	5	6	7	8	9	10	Final
Sweden (Hasselborg) 🔨	0	0	1	0	0	1	0	X	X	X	**2**
**Great Britain (Muirhead)**	0	1	0	4	1	0	2	X	X	X	**8**

Draw 3
Friday, 11 February, 14:05

Sheet D	1	2	3	4	5	6	7	8	9	10	Final
**South Korea (Kim) 🔨**	0	0	2	1	0	2	0	0	4	0	**9**
Great Britain (Muirhead)	0	1	0	0	2	0	1	2	0	1	**7**

Draw 5
Saturday, 12 February, 20:05

Sheet C	1	2	3	4	5	6	7	8	9	10	Final
**Great Britain (Muirhead) 🔨**	2	2	0	0	1	0	2	0	3	X	**10**
United States (Peterson)	0	0	0	2	0	2	0	1	0	X	**5**

Draw 6
Sunday, 13 February, 14:05

Sheet A	1	2	3	4	5	6	7	8	9	10	Final
Denmark (Dupont)	0	0	1	0	0	1	0	0	0	X	**2**
**Great Britain (Muirhead) 🔨**	2	0	0	0	1	0	0	1	3	X	**7**

Draw 8
Monday, 14 February, 20:05

Sheet B	1	2	3	4	5	6	7	8	9	10	Final
Great Britain (Muirhead) 🔨	0	0	1	0	0	1	0	1	0	0	**3**
**Canada (Jones)**	1	0	0	0	3	0	1	0	1	1	**7**

Draw 9
Tuesday, 15 February, 14:05

Sheet D	1	2	3	4	5	6	7	8	9	10	Final
**Great Britain (Muirhead) 🔨**	3	0	3	0	1	0	1	2	X	X	**10**
Japan (Fujisawa)	0	1	0	2	0	1	0	0	X	X	**4**

Draw 10
Wednesday, 16 February, 9:05

Sheet C	1	2	3	4	5	6	7	8	9	10	Final
**China (Han)**	0	0	1	0	1	0	2	0	3	1	**8**
Great Britain (Muirhead) 🔨	1	0	0	1	0	1	0	1	0	0	**4**

Draw 12
Thursday, 17 February, 14:05

Sheet B	1	2	3	4	5	6	7	8	9	10	Final
ROC (Kovaleva)	0	1	0	1	0	0	1	1	0	X	**4**
**Great Britain (Muirhead) 🔨**	2	0	1	0	1	1	0	0	4	X	**9**

Semifinal
Friday, 18 February, 20:05

Sheet A	1	2	3	4	5	6	7	8	9	10	11	Final
Sweden (Hasselborg) 🔨	4	0	1	0	0	2	0	1	0	3	0	**11**
**Great Britain (Muirhead)**	0	3	0	1	1	0	2	0	4	0	1	**12**

Gold medal game
Sunday, 20 February, 9:05

Sheet B	1	2	3	4	5	6	7	8	9	10	Final
Japan (Fujisawa)	0	1	0	0	0	1	0	1	0	X	**3**
**Great Britain (Muirhead) 🔨**	2	0	0	1	1	0	4	0	2	X	**10**

=== Mixed doubles tournament ===
Great Britain has qualified their mixed doubles team (two athletes), by finishing in the top seven teams in the 2021 World Mixed Doubles Curling Championship. On 14 October 2021, the British Olympic Association announced that reigning world champions Jennifer Dodds and Bruce Mouat would be their mixed doubles representatives.

Final Round Robin Standings
Team	Athletes	Pld	W	L	W–L	PF	PA	EW	EL	BE	SE	S%	DSC	Qualification
Italy	Stefania Constantini / Amos Mosaner	9	9	0	–	79	48	43	28	0	17	79%	25.34	Playoffs
Norway	Kristin Skaslien / Magnus Nedregotten	9	6	3	1–0	68	50	40	28	0	15	82%	24.48	Playoffs
Great Britain	Jennifer Dodds / Bruce Mouat	9	6	3	0–1	60	50	38	33	0	12	79%	22.48	Playoffs
Sweden	Almida de Val / Oskar Eriksson	9	5	4	1–0	55	54	35	33	0	10	76%	21.77	Playoffs
Canada	Rachel Homan / John Morris	9	5	4	0–1	57	54	33	39	0	8	78%	53.73	
Czech Republic	Zuzana Paulová / Tomáš Paul	9	4	5	–	50	65	29	39	1	7	75%	33.41	
Switzerland	Jenny Perret / Martin Rios	9	3	6	1–0	55	58	32	39	0	6	73%	39.04	
United States	Vicky Persinger / Chris Plys	9	3	6	0–1	50	67	34	36	0	9	74%	27.29	
China	Fan Suyuan / Ling Zhi	9	2	7	1–0	51	64	34	36	0	7	74%	17.81	
Australia	Tahli Gill / Dean Hewitt	9	2	7	0–1	52	67	31	38	1	8	72%	50.51	

Round robin
Great Britain had a bye in draws 3, 5 and 7 and will have a further bye in draw 11.

Draw 1
Wednesday, 2 February, 20:05

**Sheet A**	**1**	**2**	**3**	**4**	**5**	**6**	**7**	**8**	**Final**
Sweden (de Val / Eriksson)	0	2	0	1	2	0	0	0	**5**
**Great Britain (Dodds / Mouat) 🔨**	1	0	3	0	0	1	3	1	**9**

Draw 2
Thursday, 3 February, 9:05

**Sheet D**	**1**	**2**	**3**	**4**	**5**	**6**	**7**	**8**	**Final**
**Great Britain (Dodds / Mouat)**	0	1	1	0	1	0	2	1	**6**
Canada (Homan / Morris) 🔨	1	0	0	1	0	2	0	0	**4**

Draw 4
Thursday, 3 February, 20:05

**Sheet B**	**1**	**2**	**3**	**4**	**5**	**6**	**7**	**8**	**Final**
**Switzerland (Perret / Rios)**	0	3	0	3	0	1	0	1	**8**
Great Britain (Dodds / Mouat) 🔨	1	0	2	0	1	0	3	0	**7**

Draw 6
Friday, 4 February, 13:35

**Sheet C**	**1**	**2**	**3**	**4**	**5**	**6**	**7**	**8**	**9**	**Final**
**Great Britain (Dodds / Mouat) 🔨**	2	1	0	3	0	0	2	0	1	**9**
Australia (Gill / Hewitt)	0	0	1	0	3	2	0	2	0	**8**

Draw 8
Saturday, 5 February, 14:05

**Sheet B**	**1**	**2**	**3**	**4**	**5**	**6**	**7**	**8**	**Final**
Czech Republic (Paulová / Paul) 🔨	1	0	0	1	0	1	0	X	**3**
**Great Britain (Dodds / Mouat)**	0	2	3	0	1	0	2	X	**8**

Draw 9
Saturday, 5 February, 20:05

**Sheet A**	**1**	**2**	**3**	**4**	**5**	**6**	**7**	**8**	**Final**
Great Britain (Dodds / Mouat)	0	1	1	0	0	2	0	1	**5**
**Italy (Constantini / Mosaner) 🔨**	1	0	0	2	1	0	3	0	**7**

Draw 10
Sunday, 6 February, 9:05

**Sheet B**	**1**	**2**	**3**	**4**	**5**	**6**	**7**	**8**	**Final**
**Great Britain (Dodds / Mouat)**	1	0	0	0	3	1	0	1	**6**
China (Fan / Ling) 🔨	0	2	1	1	0	0	1	0	**5**

Draw 12
Sunday, 6 February, 20:05

**Sheet D**	**1**	**2**	**3**	**4**	**5**	**6**	**7**	**8**	**Final**
**Norway (Skaslien / Nedregotten)**	1	1	0	1	1	0	2	X	**6**
Great Britain (Dodds / Mouat) 🔨	0	0	1	0	0	1	0	X	**2**

Draw 13
Monday, 7 February, 9:05

**Sheet C**	**1**	**2**	**3**	**4**	**5**	**6**	**7**	**8**	**Final**
United States (Persinger / Plys) 🔨	0	1	0	0	2	1	0	0	**4**
**Great Britain (Dodds / Mouat)**	3	0	1	1	0	0	1	2	**8**

Semifinal
Monday, 7 February, 20:05

**Sheet A**	**1**	**2**	**3**	**4**	**5**	**6**	**7**	**8**	**Final**
**Norway (Skaslien / Nedregotten) 🔨**	0	1	0	1	0	3	0	1	**6**
Great Britain (Dodds / Mouat)	1	0	2	0	1	0	1	0	**5**

Bronze medal match
Tuesday, 8 February, 14:05

**Sheet B**	**1**	**2**	**3**	**4**	**5**	**6**	**7**	**8**	**Final**
**Sweden (de Val / Eriksson)**	0	4	3	1	1	0	X	X	**9**
Great Britain (Dodds / Mouat) 🔨	1	0	0	0	0	2	X	X	**3**

Player percentages
Sweden		Great Britain	
Almida de Val	100%	Jennifer Dodds	56%
Oskar Eriksson	82%	Bruce Mouat	85%
**Total**	89%	**Total**	73%

== Figure skating ==
Great Britain secured quotas in both the Ladies' Individual and the Ice Dance events at the 2021 World Figure Skating Championships in Stockholm. On 16 December, Team GB confirmed the selection of Lilah Fear and Lewis Gibson to compete in the ice dancing competition with Natasha McKay joining them in the women's individual event.

Athlete	Event	SP		FP		Total	
Athlete	Event	Points	Rank	Points	Rank	Points	Rank
Natasha McKay	Women's singles	52.54	28	Did not advance			
Lilah Fear; Lewis Gibson	Ice dance	76.45	10 **Q**	115.19	9	191.64	10

== Freestyle skiing ==
On 22 January 2022, Team GB announced the selection of a squad of eleven freestyle skiers to compete in Beijing. They include 2018 bronze medallist Izzy Atkin and Gus Kenworthy who formerly competed for the United States but is eligible for selection by virtue of his British-born mother.

Aerials

Athlete	Event	Qualification				Final			
Athlete	Event	Jump 1		Jump 2		Jump 1		Jump 2	
Athlete	Event	Points	Rank	Points	Rank	Points	Rank	Points	Rank
Lloyd Wallace	Men's aerials	108.41	17	71.94	15	Did not advance			21

Freeski
Men

James Woods did not compete in the slopestyle event due to a back injury.

Athlete	Event	Qualification					Final				
Athlete	Event	Run 1	Run 2	Run 3	Best	Rank	Run 1	Run 2	Run 3	Best	Rank
James Woods	Men's big air	27.50	26.50	32.25	59.75	30	Did not advance				
Gus Kenworthy	Men's halfpipe	8.50	70.75	—N/a	70.75	12 **Q**	17.50	3.75	71.25	71.25	8
James Woods	Men's slopestyle	DNS					Did not advance				

Women

Izzy Atkin who had qualified to compete in both the big air and slopestyle events was forced to withdraw due to injury.

Athlete	Event	Qualification					Final				
Athlete	Event	Run 1	Run 2	Run 3	Best	Rank	Run 1	Run 2	Run 3	Best	Rank
Kirsty Muir	Women's big air	89.25	67.00	68.25	157.50	7 **Q**	90.25	75.75	15.50	169.00	5
Katie Summerhayes	Women's big air	63.75	69.25	67.25	136.50	13	Did not advance				
Zoe Atkin	Women's halfpipe	85.25	86.75	—N/a	86.75	4 **Q**	18.75	10.75	73.25	73.25	9
Kirsty Muir	Women's slopestyle	70.11	63.91	—N/a	70.11	6 **Q**	41.86	71.30	69.21	71.30	8
Katie Summerhayes	Women's slopestyle	66.56	59.11	—N/a	66.56	10 **Q**	60.01	64.75	23.31	64.75	9

Moguls

Makayla Gerken Schofield became the first British moguls skier to reach an Olympic final, and her final 8th place finish was also the best ever achieved by a British skier.

Athlete	Event	Qualification								Final											
Athlete	Event	Run 1				Run 2				Run 1				Run 2				Run 3			
Athlete	Event	Time	Points	Total	Rank	Time	Points	Total	Rank	Time	Points	Total	Rank	Time	Points	Total	Rank	Time	Points	Total	Rank
Will Feneley	Men's moguls	26.69	57.43	70.23	23	26.45	54.42	67.54	17	Did not advance											27
Leonie Gerken Schofield	Women's moguls	DNF				31.50	49.56	62.06	17	Did not advance											27
Makayla Gerken Schofield	Women's moguls	29.13	55.01	70.18	12	29.31	52.99	67.96	7 **Q**	28.76	58.40	73.99	9 **Q**	28.59	57.26	73.04	8	Did not advance			8

Ski cross

Athlete	Event	Seeding		Round of 16	Quarterfinal	Semifinal	Final	
Athlete	Event	Time	Rank	Position	Position	Position	Position	Rank
Oliver Davies	Men's ski cross	1:14.84	31	4	Did not advance			31

Qualification legend: FA – Qualify to medal round; FB – Qualify to consolation round

== Luge ==
Great Britain secured one quota in the men's individual event and on 14 January 2022, Team GB announced the selection of Rupert Staudinger.

Athlete	Event	Run 1		Run 2		Run 3		Run 4		Total	
Athlete	Event	Time	Rank	Time	Rank	Time	Rank	Time	Rank	Time	Rank
Rupert Staudinger	Men's singles	58.731	22	58.960	22	58.622	22	Did not advance		2:56.313	23

== Short track speed skating ==
Great Britain secured quotas for two men and one woman across five events in Short track speed skating after their performance in the 2021–22 ISU Short Track Speed Skating World Cup. On 20 December 2021, Team GB confirmed the selection of Kathryn Thomson and siblings Farrell and Niall Treacy to compete in Beijing.

Athlete	Event	Heat		Quarterfinal		Semifinal		Final	
Athlete	Event	Time	Rank	Time	Rank	Time	Rank	Time	Rank
Farrell Treacy	Men's 1000 m	1:24.935	4	Did not advance					25
Niall Treacy	Men's 1000 m	1:32.243	4	Did not advance					27
Farrell Treacy	Men's 1500 m	—N/a		2:16.880	3 **Q**	2:13.75	5 **ADVA**	2:11.988	9
Kathryn Thomson	Women's 500 m	1:06.954	4	Did not advance					31
Kathryn Thomson	Women's 1000 m	1:30.037	4	Did not advance					28

Qualification Legend: FA = Qualify to final (medal); ADVA = Advanced to medal final on referee decision; FB = Qualify to final (consolation); Q = Qualify to next round on position in heat; q = Qualify to next round on time in field

== Skeleton ==
Following the conclusion of the qualification period in Skeleton, Great Britain had qualified 2 sleds each in the men's and women's disciplines. On 19 January, Team GB announced the selection of the four sliders who will represent the country in Beijing led by 2018 bronze medallist Laura Deas.

Athlete	Event	Run 1		Run 2		Run 3		Run 4		Total	
Athlete	Event	Time	Rank	Time	Rank	Time	Rank	Time	Rank	Time	Rank
Matt Weston	Men's	1:01.34	14	1:01.15	12	1:01.12	14	1:01.63	20	4:05.24	15
Marcus Wyatt	Men's	1:01.56	16	1:01.72	18	1:01.28	16	1:01.35	15	4:05.91	16
Brogan Crowley	Women's	1:03.32	23	1:03.23	21	1:02.82	21	Did not advance		3:09.37	22
Laura Deas	Women's	1:02.99	21	1:03.15	19	1:02.71	19	1:02.70	16	4:11.55	19

== Snowboarding ==
Great Britain qualified three snowboarders for Beijing and their selection was confirmed on 22 January 2022. The squad includes reigning snowboard cross world champion Charlotte Bankes.

Freestyle

Athlete	Event	Qualification					Final				
Athlete	Event	Run 1	Run 2	Run 3	Best	Rank	Run 1	Run 2	Run 3	Best	Rank
Katie Ormerod	Women's big air	14.75	60.25	9.50	69.75	25	Did not advance				
Katie Ormerod	Women's slopestyle	47.38	44.01	—N/a	47.38	19	Did not advance				

Snowboard cross

Athlete	Event	Seeding		1/8 final	Quarterfinal	Semifinal	Final	
Athlete	Event	Time	Rank	Position	Position	Position	Position	Rank
Huw Nightingale	Men's snowboard cross	1:20.72	29	4	Did not advance			30
Charlotte Bankes	Women's snowboard cross	1:22.72	2	1 **Q**	3	Did not advance		9
Charlotte Bankes; Huw Nightingale	Team snowboard cross	—N/a			1 **Q**	3 **FB**	2	6

Qualification legend: Q - Qualify to next round; FA - Qualify to medal final; FB - Qualify to consolation final

== Speed skating ==
On 4 January 2022, Team GB announced that Cornelius Kersten had been selected to represent his country in the men's 1000 and 1500m events. He will be Great Britain's first Olympic representative in the sport since 1992. On 24 January, Ellia Smeding was confirmed as Great Britain's first female speed skater since 1980.

Athlete	Event	Race	
Athlete	Event	Time	Rank
Cornelius Kersten	Men's 500 m	35.36	25
Cornelius Kersten	Men's 1000 m	1:08.79	9
Cornelius Kersten	Men's 1500 m	1:47.11	19
Ellia Smeding	Women's 1000 m	1:17.17	23
Ellia Smeding	Women's 1500 m	2:01.09	27

== See also ==
- Great Britain at the Olympics
- Great Britain at the 2022 Winter Paralympics
