= Toby Olubi =

British bobsledder (born 1987)

Personal information
- Nickname: Phantom
- Nationality: British
- Born: Oluwatobiloba Oladapo I. A. Olusegun Olubi; 24 September 1987 (age 38) Camberwell, London, England
- Education: Brunel University London
- Height: 6 ft 5 in (196 cm)
- Weight: 112 kg (247 lb)

Sport
- Country: Great Britain
- Sport: Bobsleigh

Achievements and titles
- Olympic finals: 2018 Winter
- Personal best: four-man: 3:18.29

Oluwatobiloba Oladapo I. A. Olusegun "Toby" Olubi (born 24 September 1987) is an English sprinter and bobsledder. He competed in the Bobsleigh four-man event at the 2018 Winter Olympics. In May 2023, Olubi was named "Phantom", as one of the new Gladiators in the reboot of the television series of the same name broadcasting on BBC One from January 2024.

== Life and career ==
Oluwatobiloba Oladapo I. A. Olusegun Olubi was born on 24 September 1987 in a council estate in Camberwell and attended Bacon's College, Saint Francis Xavier College, and Brunel University London, where he read economics and politics. He was initially a sprinter, but did not progress further than county level, and took up bobsledding after being invited for trials due to his then 6 ft 4in, 112 kg frame. He joined Team GB's bobsled team in June 2013, and was coached by Lee Johnston. In 2014, Olubi made a formal complaint against Johnston for telling him that "black drivers do not make good bobsleigh drivers" shortly after he began training.

Much of Olubi's salary was paid by UK Sport and the National Lottery and by a post as a secondary school supply teacher. In 2016, after finding that his salary wasn't enough for him to train five days a week, he applied for various British game shows. He appeared on an episode of The Cube, where he lost £10,000 after failing on the fourth task, before winning £12,000 on Deal or No Deal. He also appeared on Can't Touch This, a game show in which contestants are shot out of a catapult and navigate an assault course; he told PA Media in 2018 that he had been "shot out of a cannon" on the programme, and described himself as a "human cannonball".

Olubi attempted to contest the 2014 Winter Olympics, but had to pull out after suffering a serious injury, and also missed the 2015–16 Bobsleigh World Cup through injury. He and Brad Hall contested the 2017–18 Bobsleigh World Cup, but was disqualified after he fell off and completed the course on foot. He then contested the 2018 Winter Olympics, where he, Lamin Deen, Andrew Matthews, and Ben Simons came 18th. He also appeared on ITV's The Big Audition and the Discovery+ dating show Written in the Stars. In May 2023, he was named "Phantom", as one of the new Gladiators in the television series of the same name, which began broadcasting on BBC One from January 2024 and was watched by six million viewers.
