= Andrew Matthews (bobsleigh) =

British bobsledder (born 1984)

Personal information
- Nationality: British
- Born: 26 October 1984 (age 42) Slough, England
- Height: 1.72 m (5 ft 8 in)
- Weight: 83 kg (183 lb)

Sport
- Country: United Kingdom
- Sport: Bobsleigh
- Club: Windsor, Slough, Eton and Hounslow AC

Andrew Matthews (born 26 October 1984) is a British bobsledder.

Matthews competed at the 2014 Winter Olympics for Great Britain. He teamed with driver Lamin Deen, John Baines and Ben Simons in the Great Britain-2 sled in the four-man event, finishing 19th. He was a late replacement after Craig Pickering was injured.

As of April 2014, his best showing at the World Championships is 23rd, coming in the four-man event in 2013.

Matthews was born in Slough, and made his World Cup debut in December 2012. As of April 2014, his best finish is 8th, in a four-man event in 2012–13 at Winterberg.

Matthews was a member of the British gold medal winning 4x100 metre relay team at the 2003 European Athletics Junior Championships
