= Dan Pfaff =

American track and field coach

Personal information
- Full name: Dan Pfaff
- Nickname: Dan Pfaff
- Nationality: American

Sport
- Country: United States of America
- Sport: Athletics
- Club: ALTIS

Dan Pfaff is a track and field coach, who has coached national, world, and Olympic championship athletes.

Pfaff started as a high school coach, and moved up to the college ranks starting at Wichita State University. He then served as a graduate assistant at the University of Houston from 1980-81 under Tom Tellez. Pfaff was then Women's Head Track and Field coach at UTEP from 1982-84. From 1985-94, he was the head field events coach at LSU, during which time the program won multiple national championships, including back to back men's and women's national titles from 1989-90. He then had assistant coaching stints at the University of Texas and the University of Florida..

Pfaff was hired to run the United States Olympic Training Center. In summer 2009, he was made head of the Lee Valley Athletics Centre by United Kingdom Athletics (UKA), to organise the coaching and training of the UK's athletes in the run-up to the 2012 London Olympics. He also coached and trained 10 athletes within the UKA programme. Pfaff is currently one of the coaches for Altis, which is a professional track and field coaching staff as well as educational company. They are now based in Phoenix, Arizona. While Dan is listed as a coach, he is not involved in day-to-day coaching and currently resides in Austin, Texas.

== Coaching career ==
=== College ===
- University of Houston 1980-1981
- UTEP 1981-1985
- LSU 1985-1995
- Texas 1995-2003
- Florida 2003-2006

=== Professional ===
- USATF 2006-2009
- UKA 2009-2012
- ALTIS 2009-Present

== Coaching Philosophy ==
Pfaff has coached: Donovan Bailey—The 1996 Atlanta Olympic Gold Medalist in the 100m; As well as Bruny Surin and Glenroy Gilbert—who teamed with Bailey to win the 4 × 100m relay in Atlanta; Greg Rutherford who won the London 2012 Olympics in the men's long jump.

His career in track and field has seen successful over the past four decades. He is considered a leader in high performance coaching. Some of his high profile clients include NFL player Antonio Brown.
