= Skeleton at the 2022 Winter Olympics – Qualification =

Skeleton was one of the sports contested at the 2022 Winter Olympics in Beijing, China. Teams competed in eight prior events in order to qualify for the games.

== Qualification system ==
A total of 50 quota spots (25 per gender) will be available to athletes to compete at the games. A maximum of six athletes (three per gender) can be entered by a NOC. In July 2018, the International Olympic Committee moved five men's quotas to the women's event, to achieve gender equality.

The World Ranking list as of January 16, 2022 will be used to distribute the quotas. Athletes will be ranked by their best seven results. At total of two countries in each gender will qualify the maximum of three athletes, while six countries will qualify two men, (four for women), seven countries will qualify one quota in the men's event and 11 for the women's. If the host nation China fails to qualify in an event, the highest ranked sled from the country will take the last qualification slot.

An athlete must be ranked in the top 60 (men) or top 55 (women) to be eligible to compete at the games.

== Qualification timeline ==
Races from October 15, 2020 until January 16, 2022 applied to qualification for the Olympics. In general this meant that the Olympic field is established by using the world cup races of the 2021-22 season, but also includes results from Intercontinental, Europe, and America cup races. Athletes must have competed in at least eight races across at least three different tracks to be eligible.

== Quota allocation ==
The following summary is a breakdown of Olympic qualification based on the IBSF rankings and adjustments.

Official standings after all 8 races

=== Summary ===
Nations	Men	Women	Athletes
American Samoa	1	0	1
Australia	1	1	2
Austria	2	1	3
Belgium	0	1	1
Brazil	0	1	1
Canada	1	2	3
China	2	2	4
Czech Republic	0	1	1
Germany	3	3	6
Great Britain	2	2	4
Italy	2	1	3
Latvia	2	1	3
Netherlands	0	1	1
Puerto Rico	0	1	1
ROC	3	3	6
South Korea	2	1	3
Spain	1	0	1
Switzerland	1	0	1
Ukraine	1	0	1
United States	1	2	3
Virgin Islands	0	1	1
Total: 21 NOCs	25	25	50

=== Men ===
Sleds qualified	Countries	Athletes total	Nation
3	2	6	Germany; ROC
2	6	12	Latvia; South Korea; Italy; China; Great Britain; Austria
1	7	7	Ukraine; United States; American Samoa; Australia; Canada; Switzerland; Spain
25	15	25	

=== Women ===
Sleds qualified	Countries	Athletes total	Nation
3	2	6	ROC; Germany
2	4	8	Canada; United States; China; Great Britain
1	11	11	Netherlands; Austria; Italy; Belgium; Australia; Czech Republic; Brazil; Puerto Rico; Latvia; South Korea; ~~France~~; Virgin Islands
25	17	25	

=== Next eligible NOC per event ===
Only NOCs not already qualified are eligible.

Men's	Women's
Romania; Ireland; Israel; Japan; France	~~Sweden~~; Virgin Islands; Colombia; Liechtenstein
