= Niall Treacy =

British speed skater (born 2000)

Personal information
- Born: 22 July 2000 (age 26) Solihull, U.K.
- Height: 1.83 (6ft)
- Weight: 76 kg (168 lb)

Sport
- Country: Great Britain
- Sport: Short-track speed skating
- Club: Mohawks Ice Racing Club
Medal record
Men's short-track speed skating
Representing Great Britain
World Championships
Bronze medal – third place	2026 Montreal	1000 m
European Championships
Silver medal – second place	2024 Gdańsk	1000 m

Niall Treacy (born 22 July 2000) is a British short-track speed skater. He represented Great Britain at the 2022 and 2026 Winter Olympics.

== Career ==
In December 2021, Treacy was selected to represent Great Britain at the 2022 Winter Olympics, along with his brother Farrell Treacy. He competed in the 1000 metres. He crashed out in his Olympic debut. In January 2024, he competed at the 2024 European Short Track Speed Skating Championships and won a silver medal in the 1000 metres.

In December 2025, he was again selected to represent Great Britain at the 2026 Winter Olympics. He was the only short-track speed skater selected by Great Britain due to severe funding cuts. On 10 February 2026, he competed in the 1000 metres and fell during the heats after colliding with Steven Dubois. He finished fourth in the heat and did not advance to the quarterfinals. However, he did go on to make the 1500m final, finishing in 9th.

== Personal life ==
Treacy's older brother, Farrell, is also an Olympic short-track speed skater.
