= Farrell Treacy =

British speed skater

Personal information
- Nationality: British
- Born: 29 April 1995 (age 30)
- Height: 1.86 m (6 ft 1 in)
- Weight: 81 kg (179 lb)

Sport
- Country: Great Britain
- Sport: Short track speed skating

Farrell Treacy (born 29 April 1995) is a British short track speed skater. He competed in the 2018 Winter Olympics and 2022 Winter Olympics.

== Personal life ==
Treacy's younger brother, Niall, is also an Olympic short-track speed skater.
