= Bobsleigh at the 2022 Winter Olympics – Qualification =

The following is about the qualification rules and the quota allocation for the bobsleigh at the 2022 Winter Olympics.

== Qualification rules ==
A maximum of 170 quota spots are available to athletes to compete at the games. A maximum 124 men and 46 women may qualify. Qualification was based on the world rankings of the 2021/2022 season between 15 October 2020 and 16 January 2022. Pilots must compete in six different races on three different tracks and been ranked in at least five of those races. Additionally, the pilot must been ranked among the top 50 for the man's events or top 40 for the women's events. For the women's races the IBSF combined ranking will be used for the quotas involving multiple sleds, and for the first six individual quotas in monobob.

For the men's events 30 sleds were available in the two-man event and 28 in the four-man event. Meanwhile, in each of the two women's events, there were 20 sleds available. A country could enter a maximum of three sleds per event (two in the mono-bob).

NOC's per event

Number of sleds	2-men	4-men	Women's monobob	2-women
3	2	2	—N/a	2
2	7	7	4	4
1	10	8	12	6
	30	28	20	20

== Quota allocation ==
Official standings after all 8 World Cups

=== Current summary ===
The IBSF announced final quotas on January 24, 2022.

NOC	Men		Women		Athletes
NOC	Two man	Four man	Monobob	Two woman	Athletes
Australia			1	1	2
Austria	2	2	1	1	10
Belgium				1	2
Brazil	1	1			4
Canada	3	3	2	3	18
China	2	2	2	2	12
Czech Republic	1	1			4
France	1	1	1	1	6
Germany	3	3	2	3	18
Great Britain	1	1		1	6
Italy	1	2	1		9
Jamaica	1	1	1		5
Latvia	2	1			5
Monaco	1				2
Netherlands	1	1	1		5
Romania	1	1	1	1	6
ROC	2	2	1	2	12
Slovakia			1		1
South Korea	2	2	1		9
Switzerland	2	2	1	2	12
Trinidad and Tobago	1				2
Ukraine			1		1
United States	2	2	2	2	12
Total: 23 NOCs	30	28	20	20	163

=== Two man ===
Sleds qualified	Countries	Athletes total	Nation
3	2	12	Germany; Canada
2	7	28	Switzerland; United States; Latvia; South Korea; China; ROC; Austria
1	10	20	Great Britain; France; Romania; Czech Republic; Italy; Monaco; Brazil; Trinidad and Tobago; Netherlands; Jamaica
30	19	60	

=== Four man ===
Sleds qualified	Countries	Athletes total	Nation
3	2	24	Germany; Canada
2	7	56	ROC; United States; Switzerland; Austria; South Korea; China; Italy
1	8	32	Great Britain; Latvia; France; Czech Republic; Netherlands; Brazil; Romania; Jamaica
28	17	112	

=== Women's Monobob ===
Sleds qualified	Countries	Athletes total	Nation
2	4	8	United States; Germany; Canada; China
1	12	12	ROC; Switzerland; Romania; Austria; ~~Great Britain~~; Australia; Netherlands; South Korea; France; Slovakia; Jamaica; Ukraine; Italy
20	16	20	

=== Two woman ===
Sleds qualified	Countries	Athletes total	Nation
3	2	12	Germany; Canada
2	4	16	United States; China; ROC; Switzerland
1	6	12	Romania; Austria; Great Britain; Australia; Belgium; France
20	12	40	

=== Next eligible NOC per event ===
Only NOCs not already qualified are considered. Bolded nations accepted a reallocated quota.

Two man	Four man	Monobob	Two woman
Israel; Croatia; Denmark; Australia; Liechtenstein	Croatia; Australia; Israel; Liechtenstein; Japan	**Italy**; Nigeria; Brazil; Poland; Vietnam	Jamaica; South Korea; Ukraine; Italy; Vietnam
