= Ben Simons (bobsleigh) =

British bobsleigher & athlete (born 1986)

Personal information
- Nationality: British
- Born: 13 November 1986 (age 40) Broseley, Shropshire, England
- Height: 1.86 m (6 ft 1 in)
- Weight: 90 kg (198 lb)

Sport
- Country: United Kingdom
- Sport: Bobsleigh
- Club: GB Team
- Coached by: Michael Khmel; Denis Doyle

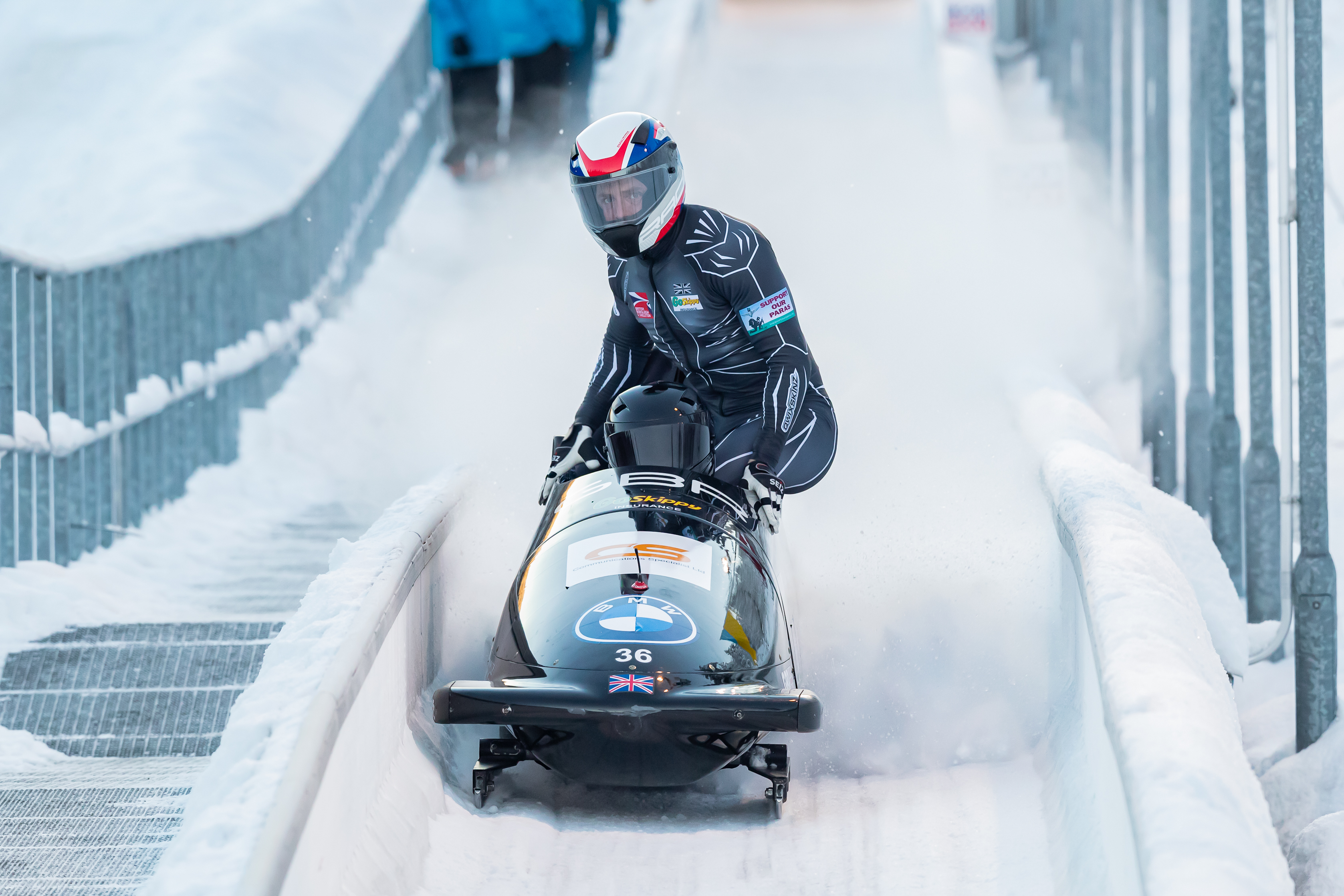
Ben Simons with bobsleigh team Lamin Deen, Joel Fearon, and Tremayne Gilling

Ben Simons (born 13 November 1986) is a British bobsleigher and former athlete. He qualified for the 2014 Winter Olympics in the 4-man discipline as part of Great Britain 2 team, behind pilot Lamin Deen, performing as the brakeman.

== Biography ==
Simons was born in 1986 in Broseley, England. As a boy, he was a talented athlete, and he represented Wenlock Olympians at the age of eight. Simons progressed to competitive athletics, joining Telford Athletics club where he initially specialised in the long jump and triple jump. In 2008 he was accepted into University of Wales Institute, Cardiff (UWIC) and joined the University's athletics club. While at Cardiff, he began to concentrate more on his sprinting competing in the 60m and 100m events. He achieved some success as a sprinter, becoming Welsh 60m champion. Simons attended William Brookes School.

In 2012 while at UWIC he replied to an advert from British Bobsleigh who were searching for 'future Olympians'. He was accepted into the team, and was soon competing at international level. It was announced on 22 January 2014 that Simons would be competing in the bobsleigh for Great Britain at the 2014 Winter Olympics in Sochi, Russia, in the four-man bobsleigh; racing in the second team (GBR2) along with John Baines, Craig Pickering and pilot Lamin Deen. Commenting on the news, Simons said that "It means the world to me to be selected to compete for Team GB at the Sochi 2014 Olympic Winter Games". It was his debut Olympics.

In the process of qualification for GBR2, Simons said that there was a nervous tension, but that they got through to competing at the Olympics. In the run-up to the 2014 Olympics, Pickering was forced to pull out of the event due to a back injury and was replaced at short notice by Andrew Matthews. In the finals GBR2 finished in nineteenth place.
