= John Baines (bobsledder) =

British bobsledder (born 1985)

Personal information
- Born: 26 September 1985 (age 41) Middlesbrough
- Years active: 2008–present
- Height: 1.89 m (6 ft 2 in)
- Weight: 100 kg (220 lb)
- Spouse: Alexandra

Sport
- Country: Great Britain
- Sport: Bobsleigh
- Events: Four-Man bobsleigh Two-man bobsleigh (stand in)ISS Falklands Soap Box Derby (Winner)
- Club: GB Bobsleigh, Bath
- Coached by: Michael Khmel
- Updated on 16 February 2014

John Baines (born 26 September 1985) is a bobsledder who competes for Team GB, and a comms specialist in the Royal Air Force. His Olympic debut was at the 2014 Winter Olympics in the two-man and four-man bobsleigh events, participating as a brakeman.

== Biography ==
John Baines was born on 26 September 1985 in Middlesbrough, England. He went to school at Ormesby Primary School. In his youth, he competed locally in 100m and 200m track events.

Baines joined the Royal Air Force at age 20; he works as a communications specialist. His first bobsleigh experience was on an RAF bobsleigh team; a few months later, he tried out in the Team GB trials and was accepted. The RAF gave him two years of support so that he could train for the 2014 Winter Olympics.

Baines has competed in bobsledding since 2008. He worked with British bobsleigh pilot Lamin Deen on the Americas Cup circuit, where they competed as GBR2.

=== Olympics ===
The Sochi Olympics is Baines' first Olympics. He originally planned to compete only in the four-man bobsleigh team, but after a "career-threatening" injury to Craig Pickering – a slipped disc – Baines was picked to replace Pickering on the two-man bobsleigh. This was announced 12 February 2014, four days before the event. Baines said that although he was sorry for Pickering, "on the other hand, I get to do the two-man as well as the four-man, so I'm quite happy".

Baines' race in the two-man bobsleigh began 16 February 2014, where he was partnered with Lamin Deen. Deen said of his new partner that "I have worked closely in the summer with John though and I'm quite confident that he can put in a great performance". They finished in 23rd place. The four-man bobsleigh was on the final weekend of the Olympics; Baines's team, GBR2, finished in 19. At both events, Baines acted as brakeman.

== Personal life ==
Baines and his wife have a son (Harrison) and a daughter(Sophia). He has one sister, Laura, who works for the National Health Service.
