= Lamin Deen =

British bobsledder

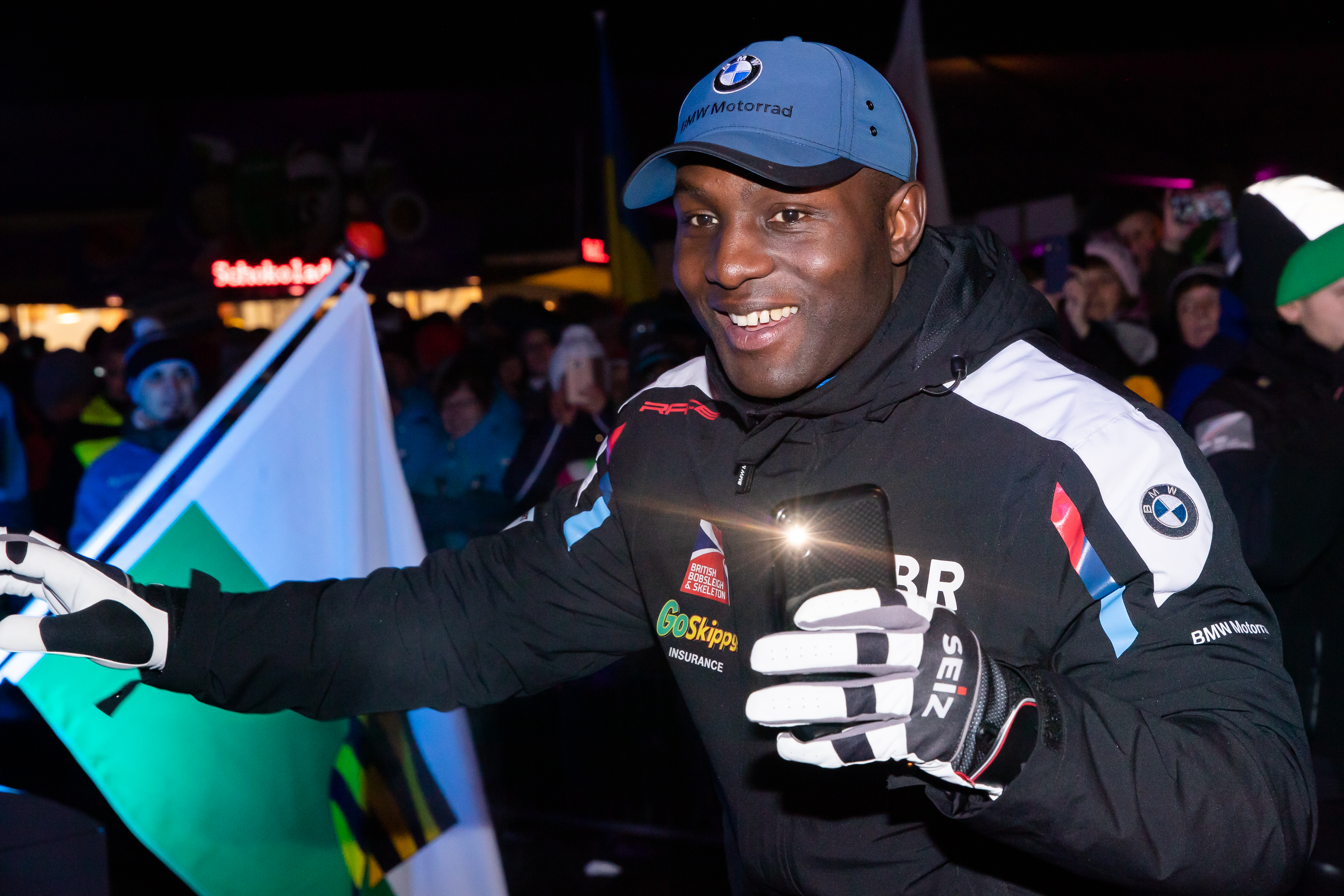
- Deen in 2020

Personal information
- Nationality: British
- Born: 17 June 1981 (age 44) London, England
- Height: 1.83 m (6 ft 0 in)
- Weight: 100 kg (220 lb)

Sport
- Country: United Kingdom
- Sport: Bobsleigh (pilot)
- Event: 2 man 4man
- Club: GB Team

Lamin Deen (born 17 June 1981) is a British bobsleigh pilot and Grenadier Guardsman. He qualified for the 2014 Winter Olympics in both the 2-man (in which he raced with John Baines) and 4-man disciplines.

Deen was born in London into a family which originally hailed from Sierra Leone. He moved to Manchester at the age of nine. He grew up in the city's Moss Side and Withington areas and was a pupil at Burnage High School before joining the Grenadier Guards, serving in Northern Ireland, Bosnia and Kosovo. He represented the British Army in athletics, boxing and basketball before competing in bobsleigh.

Deen scored a new personal best finish in the Bobsleigh World Cup in January 2014 when he (along with Stuart Benson, Bruce Tasker and Joel Fearon) finished in 11th place in the four-man event at a meeting held at the Igls track. Deen finished 19th in the four man event at the 2014 Winter Olympics and 23rd in the two man competition.

Deen enjoyed a strong start to the 2014-15 season, scoring a third and a first place in the opening two four man races of the Americas Cup at the Park City track and winning another race at the following meeting at the Calgary track. At the 2015 FIBT World Championships, Deen led crews to fifth place in the four-man event, 14th in the two-man event and eighth along with the rest of the British squad in the team event.
